= Tom Jones discography =

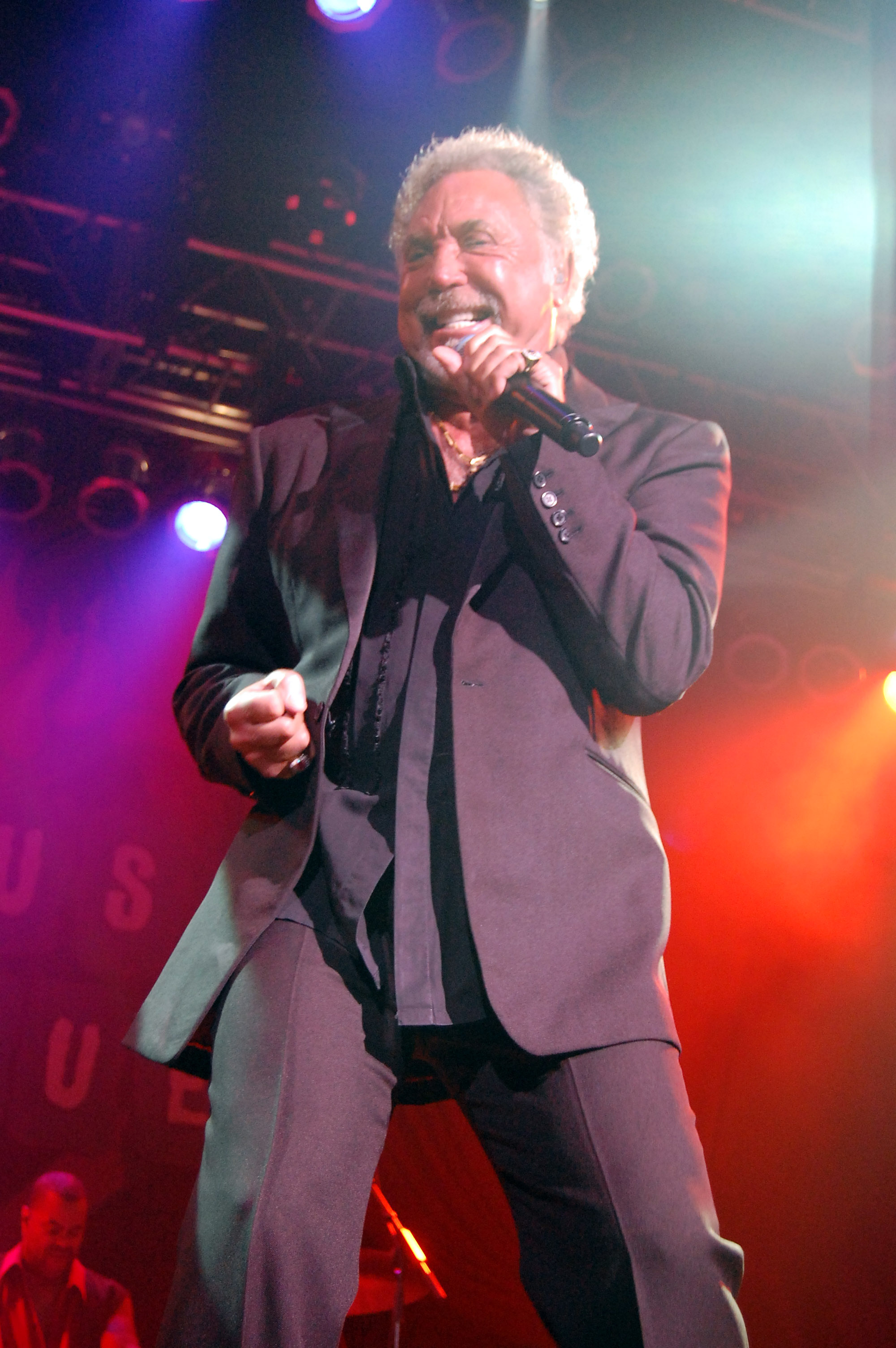
- Jones at House of Blues, Anaheim, California, in 2009
- Studio albums: 41
- Extended plays: 3
- Live albums: 5
- Compilation albums: 21
- Singles: 126
- Video albums: 20
- Music videos: 13

Tom Jones (born 7 June 1940), (real name Thomas Jones Woodward) is a Welsh singer whose career has spanned five-and-a-half decades since his emergence as a vocalist in the mid-1960s, with a string of top hits, regular touring, appearances in Las Vegas (1967–2011), and career comebacks. Jones's powerful voice has been described as a "full-throated, robust baritone". His performing range has included pop, R&B, show tunes, country, dance, soul, indie, folk, disco and gospel.

Jones has had thirty-six Top 40 hits in the United Kingdom, twenty-two in Canada, and nineteen in the United States, including "It's Not Unusual", "What's New Pussycat", "Delilah", "Green, Green Grass of Home", "She's a Lady", "Kiss", and "Sex Bomb". Jones received a Grammy Award for Best New Artist in 1966, an MTV Video Music Award in 1989, and two Brit Awards: Best British Male in 2000 and the Outstanding Contribution to Music award in 2003. Jones was awarded an OBE in 1999 and in 2006 he was knighted by Queen Elizabeth II for services to music.

As of 2010, during the Nielsen Soundscan era (which tracks sales from 1991) Tom Jones has sold 6.5 million albums in United States.

== Albums ==
=== Studio albums ===
Year	Title	Peak chart positions										Sales	Certifications (sales thresholds)
Year	Title	UK	AUS	CAN	FIN	GER	NZ	NOR	SWE	SWI	US	Sales	Certifications (sales thresholds)
1965	Along Came Jones (UK): Released: May 1965; Label: Decca	11	—	n.a.	—	—	—	—	—	—	n.a.		
1965	It's Not Unusual (US): Released: July 1965; Label: Parrot	n.a.	n.a.	—	n.a.	n.a.	n.a.	n.a.	n.a.	n.a.	54		
1965	What's New Pussycat? (US): Released: 1965; Label: Parrot	n.a.	n.a.	—	n.a.	n.a.	n.a.	n.a.	n.a.	n.a.	114		
1966	A-tom-ic Jones (UK): Released: 14 January 1966; Label: Decca	—	—	n.a.	—	—	—	—	—	—	n.a.		
1966	A-tom-ic Jones (US): Released: February 1966; Label: Parrot	n.a.	n.a.	—	n.a.	n.a.	n.a.	n.a.	n.a.	n.a.	—		
1966	From the Heart (UK): Released: September 1966; Label: Decca	23	—	n.a.	—	—	—	—	—	—	n.a.		
1967	Green, Green Grass of Home (UK): Released: March 1967; Label: Decca	3	7	n.a.	—	5	—	11	—	—	n.a.		
1967	Green, Green Grass of Home (US): Released: March 1967; Label: Parrot	n.a.	n.a.	—	n.a.	n.a.	n.a.	n.a.	n.a.	n.a.	65		US: Gold
1967	Funny Familiar Forgotten Feelings (US): Released: June 1967; Label: Parrot	n.a.	n.a.	—	n.a.	n.a.	n.a.	n.a.	n.a.	n.a.	—		
1967	13 Smash Hits (UK): Released: December 1967; Label: Decca	5	—	n.a.	1	6	—	20	—	—	n.a.		
1968	The Tom Jones Fever Zone (US): Released: May 1968; Label: Parrot	n.a.	n.a.	25	n.a.	n.a.	n.a.	n.a.	n.a.	n.a.	14		US: Gold
1968	Delilah (UK): Released: July 1968; Label: Decca	1	—	n.a.	1	2	—	1	—	—	n.a.		
1968	Help Yourself: Released: November 1968 (UK) / December 1968 (US); Label: Decca / Parrot	4	—	3	1	7	—	1	—	—	5		US: Gold
1969	This Is Tom Jones: Released: June 1969; Label: Decca / Parrot	2	2	4	1	9	—	2	12	—	4		US: Gold
1970	Tom: Released: April 1970; Label: Decca / Parrot	4	6	4	2	—	—	6	5	—	6		US: Gold
1970	I Who Have Nothing: Released: November 1970; Label: Decca / Parrot	10	—	21	5	—	—	20	—	—	23		US: Gold
1971	She's a Lady: Released: May 1971; Label: Decca / Parrot	9	39	12	3	4	—	16	8	—	17		US: Gold
1972	Tom Jones Close Up: Released: June 1972; Label: Decca / Parrot	17	—	19	—	—	—	—	—	—	64		
1973	The Body and Soul of Tom Jones: Released: June 1973; Label: Decca / Parrot	31	—	—	—	—	—	—	—	—	93		
1974	Somethin' 'Bout You Baby I Like: Released: August 1974; Label: Decca / Parrot	—	98	—	—	—	—	—	—	—	—		
1975	Memories Don't Leave Like People Do: Released: December 1975; Label: Decca / Parrot	—	—	—	—	—	—	—	—	—	—		
1977	Say You'll Stay Until Tomorrow: Released: February 1977; Label: EMI / Epic	—	88	63	—	—	24	—	—	—	76^{[A]}		
1977	What a Night: Released: November 1977; Label: EMI / Epic	—	—	—	—	—	—	—	—	—	—		
1979	Do You Take This Man: Released: September 1979; Label: Columbia	—	—	—	—	—	—	—	—	—	—		
1979	Rescue Me: Released: October 1979; Label: EMI / MCA	—	—	—	—	—	—	—	—	—	—		
1981	Darlin': Released: October 1981; Label: Mercury	—	—	—	—	—	—	—	—	—	179^{[B]}		
1982	Tom Jones Country: Released: August 1982; Label: Mercury	—	—	—	—	—	—	—	—	—	—^{[C]}		
1983	Don't Let Our Dreams Die Young: Released: November 1983; Label: Mercury	—	—	—	—	—	—	—	—	—	—^{[D]}		
1984	Love Is on the Radio: Released: 1984; Label: Mercury	—	—	—	—	—	—	—	—	—	—^{[E]}		
1985	Tender Loving Care: Released: 1985; Label: Mercury	—	—	—	—	—	—	—	—	—	—^{[F]}		
1989	At This Moment (titled Move Closer in the US): Released: 1989; Label: Jive	34	92	78	29	—	—	—	37	—	—		
1991	Carrying a Torch: Released: 1991; Label: Dover	44	—	—	—	—	—	—	29	—	—		
1994	The Lead and How to Swing It: Released: 1994; Label: Interscope / ZTT / Atlantic	55	19	—	1	81	—	—	31	—	—		ARIA: Platinum; FIN: Gold
1999	Reload: Released: 16 September 1999; Label: V2	1	3	15	31	3	4	6	1	5	—	WW: 4,000,000	BPI: 5× Platinum; AUS: 2× Platinum; CAN: Gold; GER: Platinum; NZ: Platinum; SWE: Platinum; SWI: Platinum
2002	Mr. Jones: Released: 10 December 2002; Label: V2	36	—	—	—	78	—	—	31	62	—		
2004	Tom Jones & Jools Holland (with Jools Holland): Released: 27 September 2004; Label: Radar / Warner Strategic Marketing	5	—	—	—	—	—	—	—	—	—		BPI: Gold
2008	24 Hours: Released: 28 November 2008; Label: S-Curve	32	—	—	—	70	—	—	50	94	105	US: 54,000	BPI: Gold
2010	Praise & Blame: Released: 26 July 2010; Label: Island	2	32	—	49	37	13	22	7	51	79		BPI: Gold
2012	Spirit in the Room: Released: 21 May 2012; Label: Island / Rounder	8	—	—	—	95	—	38	33	—	—		
2015	Long Lost Suitcase: Released: 9 October 2015; Label: Virgin EMI / S-Curve	17	—	—	—	—	—	—	—	—	—		
2021	Surrounded by Time: Released: 23 April 2021; Label: EMI / S-Curve	1	—	—	—	24	—	—	—	14	—^{[G]}		
"—" denotes a release that did not chart.

Notes

- A Say You'll Stay Until Tomorrow also charted at number 3 on the Billboard Top Country Albums chart.
- B Darlin' also charted at number 19 on the Billboard Top Country Albums chart.
- C Country charted at number 21 on the Billboard Top Country Albums chart.
- D Don't Let Our Dreams Die Young charted at number 9 on the Billboard Top Country Albums chart.
- E Love Is on the Radio charted at number 40 on the Billboard Top Country Albums chart.
- F Tender Loving Care charted at number 54 on the Billboard Top Country Albums chart.
- G Surrounded by Time charted at number 68 on the Billboard Top Album Sales chart.
- n.a.: not applicable, as album was not released in that region

=== Live albums ===
Year	Title	Peak chart positions										Certifications (sales thresholds)
Year	Title	UK	AUS	CAN	FIN	GER	NZ	NOR	SWE	SWI	US	Certifications (sales thresholds)
1967	Tom Jones Live! At the Talk of the Town: Released: June 1967 (UK) / October 1967 (US); Recorded: 1967 at the Talk of the Town; Label: Decca / Parrot	6	8	9	3	—	—	—	—	—	13	US: Gold
1969	Tom Jones Live in Las Vegas: Released: November 1969; Recorded: 1969 at the Flamingo; Label: Decca / Parrot	2	2	2	1	23	—	3	3	—	3	US: Gold; CAN: 2× Platinum; FIN: Gold
1971	Tom Jones Live at Caesar's Palace: Released: November 1971; Recorded: 1971 at Caesars Palace; Label: Decca / Parrot	27	—	27	—	—	—	—	—	—	43	US: Gold
2005	John Farnham & Tom Jones – Together in Concert (with John Farnham): Released: 20 March 2005; Recorded: 2005 at the Rod Laver Arena; Label: Sony BMG	—	3	—	—	—	—	—	—	—	—	AUS: Platinum
2010	Tom Jones: Promotional The Mail on Sunday CD; Released: 2010; Recorded: 2009 at Wembley and Union Chapel; Label: Universal Island Records Limited	n.a.	n.a.	n.a.	n.a.	n.a.	n.a.	n.a.	n.a.	n.a.	n.a.	
"—" denotes a release that did not chart.

Notes

- n.a.: not applicable, as album was either not released in that region or not eligible to chart due to the nature of its release

=== Compilation albums ===
Year	Title	Peak chart positions										Certifications (sales thresholds)
Year	Title	UK	AUS	CAN	FIN	GER	NZ	NOR	SWE	SWI	US	Certifications (sales thresholds)
1968	The Great Tom Jones (Europe): Released: 1968; Label: Decca	n.a.	—	n.a.	3	—	—	—	—	—	n.a.	
1973	Tom Jones' Greatest Hits: Released: 1973; Label: Decca / Parrot	15	89	86	—	—	—	—	—	—	185	
1975	20 Greatest Hits: The Tenth Anniversary Album of Tom Jones: Released: 1975; Label: Decca / Tele House	1	—	—	9	—	—	—	—	—	—	BPI: Gold
1978	I'm Coming Home – 20 of the Finest Songs of Tom Jones (UK): Released: 1978; Label: Lotus	12	—	n.a.	—	—	—	—	—	—	n.a.	BPI: Gold
1978	His 20 Greatest Hits (Europe): Released: 1978; Label: K-Tel	n.a.	—	n.a.	—	12	—	—	—	—	n.a.	
1982	It's Not Unusual (UK): Released: 1982; Label: Pickwick	—	—	—	—	—	—	—	—	—	—	BPI: Gold
1985	Tom Jones Sings the Favourites (Australasia): Released: 1985; Label: RCA	n.a.	—	n.a.	n.a.	n.a.	5	n.a.	n.a.	n.a.	n.a.	
1987	The Greatest Hits (UK): Released: 1987; Label: Telstar	16	n.a.	n.a.	n.a.	n.a.	n.a.	n.a.	n.a.	n.a.	n.a.	
1989	Greatest Collection (Finland): Released: 1989; Label: Finnlevy / Fazer	n.a.	n.a.	n.a.	22	n.a.	n.a.	n.a.	n.a.	n.a.	n.a.	
1989	Tom Jones After Dark (UK): Released: 1989; Label: Stylus	46	n.a.	n.a.	n.a.	n.a.	n.a.	n.a.	n.a.	n.a.	n.a.	
1992	The Complete Tom Jones: Released: 1992; Label: The Hit Label	8	50	—	—	—	44	—	—	—	—	BPI: Gold
1998	The Best of...Tom Jones: Released: 1998; Label: PolyGram	—	39	—	—	—	—	20	15	—	—	BPI: Gold
1998	The Ultimate Hits Collection (UK): Released: 1998; Label: PolyGram	26	—	—	—	—	—	—	—	—	—	BPI: Gold
2000	Best of the Tiger (Europe): Released: 22 May 2000; Label: WSM / Warner	n.a.	—	n.a.	—	53	—	—	—	49	n.a.	
2003	The Definitive Tom Jones: Four-disc box set; Released: 2003; Label: Universal	—	—	—	—	—	—	—	—	—	—	
2003	Greatest Hits (UK): Released: 2003; Label: Universal	2	68	n.a.	16	—	5	—	41	96	n.a.	BPI: Platinum
2003	Reloaded: Greatest Hits (US): Released: 2003; Label: Universal	n.a.	n.a.	78	n.a.	n.a.	n.a.	n.a.	n.a.	n.a.	127	
2005	Gold: Released: 2005; Label: Universal	—	—	—	—	—	—	—	—	—	—	
2006	Forever Tom Jones: Released: 2006; Label: Universal	—	—	89	—	—	—	—	—	—	—	
2010	Greatest Hits – Rediscovered (UK): Released: 2010; Label: Universal	49	—	n.a.	48	—	—	—	15	—	n.a.	BPI: Gold
2020	The Complete Decca Studio Albums Collection: 17-disc box set; Released: 18 December 2020; Label: Decca	—	—	—	—	—	—	—	—	—	—	
"—" denotes a release that did not chart.

Notes

- n.a.: not applicable, as album was not released in that region

== EPs ==
Year	Title	UK EP chart positions
1965	Tom Jones On Stage (UK): Released: 26 March 1965; Label: Decca	3
1965	Tom Jones (UK): Released: November 1965; Label: Columbia	—
1967	What A Party (UK): Released: January 1967; Label: Decca	—

== Singles ==
=== 1960s ===
Year	Single	Peak chart positions										Certifications	Album
Year	Single	UK	AUT	BEL	CAN	GER	IRE	NED	NOR	SWI	US	Certifications	Album
1964	"Chills and Fever"	—	—	—	—	—	—	—	—	—	—		Single release only
1965	"It's Not Unusual"	1	—	—	2	—	6	—	—	—	10	BPI: Platinum	Along Came Jones
1965	"Once Upon a Time"	32	—	—	—	—	—	—	—	—	—		Along Came Jones
1965	"Little Lonely One"	—	—	—	16	—	—	—	—	—	42		Single release only
1965	"With These Hands"	13	—	—	5	—	—	—	—	—	27		What's New Pussycat?
1965	"What's New Pussycat?"	11	—	—	1	—	—	10	—	—	3		What's New Pussycat?
1965	"Lonely Joe"	—	—	—	—	—	—	—	—	—	—		Single releases only
1965	"Chills and Fever"	—	—	—	—	—	—	—	—	—	125		Single releases only
1966	"Thunderball"	35	10	6	10	—	—	—	—	—	25		Single releases only
1966	"Promise Her Anything"	—	—	—	47	—	—	—	—	—	74		Promise Her Anything Soundtrack
1966	"To Make a Big Man Cry"	—	—	—	—	—	—	—	—	—	—		A-tom-ic Jones
1966	"Stop Breaking My Heart"	—	—	—	—	—	—	—	—	—	—		Single releases only
1966	"Once There Was a Time"/"Not Responsible"	18	—	20	33	33	—	—	—	—	58		Single releases only
1966	"What a Party"	—	—	—	—	—	—	—	—	—	120		Single releases only
1966	"This and That"	44	—	—	—	—	—	—	—	—	—		Single releases only
1966	"Green, Green Grass of Home"	1	2	1	5	6	1	2	1	—	11	BPI: Silver	Green, Green Grass of Home
1967	"Detroit City"	8	14	3	16	35	4	5	—	—	27		Green, Green Grass of Home
1967	"Sixteen Tons" (N. America only)	N/A	—	—	70	—	—	—	—	—	68		Green, Green Grass of Home
1967	"Funny Familiar Forgotten Feelings"	7	—	3	33	38	4	9	—	—	49		Green, Green Grass of Home
1967	"I'll Never Fall in Love Again"	2	19	2	64	31	4	4	—	—	49	BPI: Silver	13 Smash Hits
1967	"I'm Coming Home"	2	16	1	52	39	10	6	—	—	57		Single release only
1967	"He'll Have to Go"	—	—	—	—	—	—	—	—	—	—		Green, Green Grass of Home
1968	"Delilah"	2	3	1	5	1	1	1	2	1	15	BPI: Silver	Delilah
1968	"Help Yourself"	5	3	1	34	1	1	7	4	3	35		Help Yourself
1968	"A Minute of Your Time"	14	8	2	17	9	5	—	—	9	48		Single releases only
1968	"Looking Out My Window"	—	—	—	—	—	—	—	—	—	—		Single releases only
1969	"Love Me Tonight"	9	16	2	4	11	7	20	—	—	13		Single releases only
1969	"I'll Never Fall in Love Again" (reissue)	—	—	—	4	—	—	—	—	—	6		Single releases only
1969	"Without Love (There Is Nothing)"	10	29	3	1	—	7	24	—	—	5		Tom

=== 1970s ===
Year	Single	Peak chart positions										Album
Year	Single	UK	AUT	BEL	CAN	GER	IRE	NED	NOR	SWI	US	Album
1970	"Daughter of Darkness"	5	15	3	11	15	3	16	—	—	13	I Who Have Nothing
1970	"I (Who Have Nothing)"	16	—	6	10	—	—	—	—	—	14	I Who Have Nothing
1970	"Can't Stop Loving You"	—	—	—	17	—	—	—	—	—	25	Tom
1971	"She's a Lady"	13	12	3	1	7	13	8	6	—	2	She's a Lady
1971	"Puppet Man"	49	—	22	9	36	—	—	—	—	26	She's a Lady
1971	"Resurrection Shuffle"	—	—	—	35	—	—	—	—	—	38	She's a Lady
1971	"Till"	2	—	7	44	40	7	—	—	—	41	Single release only
1972	"The Young New Mexican Puppeteer"	6	—	—	41	35	7	—	—	—	80	Close Up
1973	"Golden Days"	—	—	—	—	—	—	—	—	—	—	Single release only
1973	"Letter to Lucille"	31	—	18	—	49	17	—	—	—	60	The Body and Soul of Tom Jones
1973	"Today I Started Loving You Again"	—	—	—	—	—	—	—	—	—	—	The Body and Soul of Tom Jones
1973	"La La La (Just Having You Here)"	—	—	—	—	—	—	—	—	—	—	Single release only
1974	"Somethin' 'Bout You Baby I Like"	36	—	—	—	—	—	—	—	—	—	Somethin' 'Bout You Baby I Like
1974	"Pledging My Love"	—	—	—	93	—	—	—	—	—	—	Single releases only
1975	"Ain't No Love"	—	—	—	—	—	—	—	—	—	—	Single releases only
1975	"I Got Your Number"	—	—	—	—	—	—	—	—	—	—	Memories Don't Leave Like People Do
1975	"Memories Don't Leave Like People Do"	—	—	—	—	—	—	—	—	—	—	Memories Don't Leave Like People Do
1977	"Say You'll Stay Until Tomorrow"	40	—	—	12	—	—	—	—	—	15	Say You'll Stay Until Tomorrow
1977	"Papa"	—	—	—	—	—	—	—	—	—	—	Say You'll Stay Until Tomorrow
1977	"Have You Ever Been Lonely?"	—	—	—	—	—	—	—	—	—	—	Say You'll Stay Until Tomorrow
1977	"Take Me Tonight"	—	—	—	—	—	—	—	—	—	101	Say You'll Stay Until Tomorrow
1977	"What a Night!"	—	—	—	—	—	—	—	—	—	—	What a Night
1978	"No One Gave Me Love"	—	—	—	—	—	—	—	—	—	—	What a Night
1978	"Baby as You Turn Away"	—	—	—	—	—	—	—	—	—	—	Single release only
1979	"Dancing Endlessly"	—	—	—	—	—	—	—	—	—	—	Rescue Me
1979	"Do You Take This Man?"	—	—	—	—	—	—	—	—	—	—	Do You Take This Man

=== 1980s ===
Year	Single	Peak chart positions										Certifications	Album
Year	Single	UK	AUT	BEL	GER	IRE	NED	NOR	SWI	US	US Country	Certifications	Album
1981	"Sonny Boy"	—	—	—	—	—	—	—	—	—	—		Single release only
1981	"Darlin'"	—	—	—	—	—	—	—	—	101	19		Darlin'
1981	"What in the World's Come Over You"	—	—	—	—	—	—	—	—	—	25		Darlin'
1981	"Come Home Rhondda Boy"	—	—	—	—	—	—	—	—	—	—		Darlin'
1981	"But I Do"	—	—	—	—	—	—	—	—	—	—		Darlin'
1982	"Lady Lay Down"	—	—	—	—	—	—	—	—	—	26		Darlin'
1982	"A Woman's Touch"	—	—	—	—	—	—	—	—	—	16		Country
1983	"Touch Me (I'll Be Your Fool Once More)"	—	—	—	—	—	—	—	—	—	4		Country
1983	"It'll Be Me"	—	—	—	—	—	—	—	—	—	34		Country
1983	"I'll Be Here Where the Heart Is"	—	—	—	—	—	—	—	—	—	—		Single release only
1983	"I've Been Rained On Too"	—	—	—	—	—	—	—	—	—	13		Don't Let Our Dreams Die Young
1984	"This Time"	—	—	—	—	—	—	—	—	—	30		Don't Let Our Dreams Die Young
1984	"All the Love Is on the Radio"	—	—	—	—	—	—	—	—	—	53		All the Love Is on the Radio
1985	"I'm an Old Rock 'N' Roller"	—	—	—	—	—	—	—	—	—	67		All the Love Is on the Radio
1985	"Give Her All the Roses"	—	—	—	—	—	—	—	—	—	48		All the Love Is on the Radio
1985	"It's Four in the Morning"	—	—	—	—	—	—	—	—	—	36		Tender Loving Care
1985	"Not Another Heart Song"	—	—	—	—	—	—	—	—	—	—		Tender Loving Care
1987	"A Boy from Nowhere"	2	—	11	—	5	79	—	—	—	—	BPI: Silver	Matador
1987	"It's Not Unusual" (reissue)	17	—	—	—	15	—	—	—	—	—		The Greatest Hits
1987	"I Was Born to Be Me"	61	—	—	—	—	—	—	—	—	—		Matador
1987	"What's New Pussycat" (reissue)	—	—	—	—	—	—	—	—	—	—		The Greatest Hits
1988	"Kiss" (Art of Noise featuring Tom Jones)	5	4	5	16	8	6	8	11	31	—		At This Moment
1989	"Move Closer"	49	—	—	—	—	—	—	—	—	—		At This Moment
1989	"At This Moment"	—	—	—	—	—	—	—	—	—	—		At This Moment

=== 1990s ===
Year	Single	Peak chart positions										Certifications	Album
Year	Single	UK	AUT	BEL	CAN	GER	IRE	NED	NOR	SWI	US Dance	Certifications	Album
1991	"Couldn't Say Goodbye"	51	—	—	—	—	—	—	—	—	—		Carrying a Torch
1991	"Carrying a Torch" (Tom Jones and Van Morrison)	57	—	—	—	—	—	—	—	—	—		Carrying a Torch
1991	"I'm Not Feeling It Anymore"	—	—	—	—	—	—	—	—	—	—		Carrying a Torch
1992	"Delilah" (re-recording)	68	—	—	—	—	—	—	—	—	—		The Complete Tom Jones
1993	"All You Need Is Love"	19	—	—	—	—	—	—	—	—	—		Single releases only
1993	"Gimme Shelter" (New Model Army with Tom Jones)	23	—	—	—	—	—	—	—	—	—		Single releases only
1994	"If I Only Knew"	11	30	—	49	82	—	13	—	—	4		The Lead and How to Swing It
1994	"Situation"	—	—	—	—	—	—	—	—	—	23		The Lead and How to Swing It
1994	"I Wanna Get Back with You" (with Tori Amos)	94	—	—	—	—	—	—	—	—	—		The Lead and How to Swing It
1994	"Love Is On Our Side"	—	—	—	—	—	—	—	—	—	—		The Lead and How to Swing It
1997	"You Can Leave Your Hat On"	—	—	—	—	—	—	—	—	—	—		The Full Monty soundtrack
1997	"Kung Fu Fighting" (with Ruby)	—	—	—	—	—	—	—	—	—	—		Super Cop soundtrack
1999	"Burning Down the House" (with The Cardigans)	7	21	52	—	27	18	58	4	31	—	BPI: Silver	Reload
1999	"Baby, It's Cold Outside" (with Cerys Matthews)	17	—	—	—	—	—	—	—	—	—	BPI: Silver	Reload

=== 2000s ===
Year	Single	Peak chart positions										Certifications	Album
Year	Single	UK	AUT	BEL	CAN	GER	IRE	NED	NOR	SWI	US Dance	Certifications	Album
2000	"Mama Told Me Not to Come" (with Stereophonics)	4	—	—	—	73	11	77	—	51	—	BPI: Silver	Reload
2000	"Sex Bomb" (with Mousse T.)	3	3	2	—	3	7	11	18	1	—	BPI: Silver	Reload
2000	"You Need Love Like I Do" (with Heather Small)	24	—	63	—	100	—	—	—	56	—		Reload
2002	"Pussycat" (with Wyclef Jean)	—	—	—	—	—	—	—	—	—	—		Single release only
2002	"Tom Jones International"	31	47	—	—	—	—	—	—	30	—		Mr Jones
2002	"Heaven's Been a Long Time Coming"	—	—	—	—	—	—	—	—	—	—		Mr Jones
2003	"Black Betty"/"I (Who Have Nothing)"	50	—	—	—	49	—	—	—	14	—		Mr Jones
2004	"Sex Bomb (The Remixes)"	—	—	—	—	—	—	—	—	—	11		Single release only
2004	"It'll Be Me" (with Jools Holland)	84	—	—	—	—	—	—	—	—	—		Tom Jones and Jools Holland
2004	"She's a Lady" (vs Funkstar De Luxe)	—	—	—	—	—	—	—	—	96	—		Single release only
2005	"Hold on I'm Coming" (with John Farnham)	—	—	—	—	—	—	—	—	—	—		Together in Concert
2005	"She's a Lady"	—	—	—	8	—	—	—	—	—	—		Single releases only
2006	"Stoned in Love" (Chicane featuring Tom Jones)	7	—	—	—	—	23	66	—	—	—		Single releases only
2006	"Cry for Home" (Van Morrison with Tom Jones)	—	—	—	—	—	—	—	—	—	—		Single releases only
2008	"If He Should Ever Leave You"	—	—	56	—	—	—	—	—	—	—		24 Hours
2008	"Sugar Daddy"	—	—	—	—	—	—	—	—	—	—		24 Hours
2008	"Give a Little Love"	—	—	—	—	—	—	—	—	—	—		24 Hours
2009	"Take Me Back to the Party"	—	—	—	—	—	—	—	—	—	—		24 Hours
2009	"(Barry) Islands in the Stream" (with Rob Brydon, Ruth Jones and Robin Gibb)	1	—	—	—	—	—	—	—	—	—		Single release only

=== 2010s and 2020s ===
Year	Single	Peak positions	Album (UK releases)
Year	Single	UK	Album (UK releases)
2010	"Burning Hell"/"What Good Am I?"	—	Praise & Blame
2010	"Strange Things"/"Did Trouble Me"	—	Praise & Blame
2010	"Didn't It Rain"	—	Praise & Blame
2010	"Lord Help"/"Run On"	—	Praise & Blame
2012	"Evil"/"Jezebel" (with Jack White)	—	Single release only
2012	"Hit or Miss"	—	Spirit in the Room
2012	"Bad as Me"	—	Spirit in the Room
2012	"Tower of Song"	—	Spirit in the Room
2012	"I'll Sail My Ship Alone" (with Jools Holland)	—	Single releases only
2012	"On My Own" (with Robbie Williams)	—	Single releases only
2021	"Talking Reality Television Blues"	—	Surrounded by Time
2021	"No Hole in My Head"	—	Surrounded by Time
2021	"One More Cup of Coffee"	— (Note: "One More Cup of Coffee" did not enter the Official UK Top 100 Chart, but debuted and peaked at number 68 on the Official Singles Sales Chart Top 100.)	Surrounded by Time
2021	"Pop Star"	—	Surrounded by Time
"—" denotes releases that did not chart

== Music videos ==
Year	Video
1983	"It'll Be Me"
1987	"It's Not Unusual"
1988	"Kiss"
1994	"If I Only Knew"
1994	"I Wanna Get Back with You"
1999	"Burning Down the House"
2000	"Mama Told Me Not to Come"
2000	"Sex Bomb"
2000	"You Need Love Like I Do"
2003	"Black Betty"
2008	"24 Hours"
2012	"Tower of Song"
2015	"Elvis Presley Blues"
2021	"No Hole in My Head"

== Videos and DVDs ==
- Tom Jones Born to Be Me (1987)
- Tom Jones Live at This Moment (1989)
- This Is Tom Jones (1992) [Programme content 1969–71]
- This Is Tom Jones Too (1993) [Programme content 1969–71]
- Tom Jones One Night Only... (1996)
- An Audience with Tom Jones (1999)
- Tom Jones London Bridge Special (1999) [Programme from 1974]
- Tom Jones Classic Country (1999) [Programme content from 1980 to 1981]
- Tom Jones 35 Classic Ballads (2000) [Programme content from 1980 to 1981]
- Tom Jones – The Ultimate Collection (2000) [Programme content from 1980 to 1981]
- Tom Jones – Sincerely Yours (2002) [Programme content from 1980 to 1981]
- Tom Jones Live at Cardiff Castle (2002)
- Tom Jones – Duets by Invitation Only (2002) [Programme content from 1980 to 1981]
- Tom Jones – Classic R&B and Funk (2004) [Programme content from 1980 to 1981]
- John Farnham & Tom Jones Together in Concert (2005)
- Tom Jones Sounds in Motion Legends in Concert (2006)
- Tom Jones Christmas (2007) [Programme content produced between 1969 and 1971]
- This Is Tom Jones (2007) - 3 DVD set featuring content from the ABC show of the same name
- This Is Tom Jones Volume 2: Legendary Performers (2008) - 3 DVD set featuring additional content from the ABC show of the same name
- This Is Tom Jones Volume 3: What's New Pussycat (2009) - Single DVD featuring content from the ABC show of the same name
