= What a Night (Tom Jones album) =

Studio album by Tom Jones
- Released: 2 January 1977
- Recorded: H.B. Barnum Studio, LA
- Label: Epic EMC 3221
- Producer: Gordon Mills

Tom Jones chronology
| Say You'll Stay Until Tomorrow (1977) | What a Night (1977) | Do You Take This Man (1979) |

Professional ratings
Review scores
| Source | Rating |
|---|---|
| AllMusic | 2.5/5 stars |

What a Night is a 1977 album by Tom Jones on Epic Records produced by Gordon Mills. The album was promoted by Epic as showing a more sensitive and thoughtful side to the singer.

== Track listing ==
1. "What a Night"
2. "We Don't Live Here"
3. "No One Gave Me Love"
4. "Day to Day Affair"
5. "If This Is Love"
6. "I Wrote This Song"
7. "That's Where I Belong"
8. "Easy to Love"
9. "The Heart"
10. "Ramblin' Man"
