= Help Yourself (Tom Jones album) =

Studio album by Tom Jones
- Released: November 1968
- Length: 43:27
- Label: Decca
- Producer: Peter Sullivan

Tom Jones chronology
Delilah (1968)	Help Yourself (1968)	This Is Tom Jones (1969)

Singles from Help Yourself
- 1. "Help Yourself" Released: 23 July 1968

Professional ratings
Review scores
Source	Rating
AllMusic	2/5 stars

Help Yourself is the twelfth studio album by Welsh singer Tom Jones, released in November 1968 on Decca Records. The album included the title track, which reached number 5 in the UK. The track topped the charts in Ireland, Germany, and spent three weeks at number on the Australian chart.

Help Yourself peaked at number 4 in the UK and number 5 on the Billboard 200 in 1969.

== Reception ==
Stephen Thomas Erlewine of AllMusic writes, "The infectious title track was a Top 40 hit and it helped make Help Yourself Tom Jones' first Top Ten album, but the record was weighed down by lackluster material, making the album his weakest set since A-tom-ic Jones."

== Track listing ==
Side one

1. "Help Yourself" (Carlo Donida, Jack Fishman) – 2:53
2. "I Can't Break The News to Myself" (Jimmy Williams, Larry Harrison) – 2:31
3. "The Bed" (Dick Heard, Eddie Rabbitt) – 2:46
4. "Set Me Free" (Curly Putman) – 3:15
5. "I Get Carried Away" (Annette Tucker, Keith Colley, Nancy Mantz) – 3:02
6. "Laura" (Leon Ashley, Margie Singleton) – 3:38
7. "Elusive Dreams" (Curly Putnam) – 3:46

Side two

8. "The House Song" (Noel Paul Stookey, Robert H. Bannard) – 3:38
9. "So Afraid" (Jerry Chesnut) – 3:23
10. "If I Promise" (Jerry Reed) – 2:15
11. "If You Go Away" (Jacques Brel, Rod McKuen) – 4:03
12. "My Girl Maria" (James Luck, John Szego) – 3:25
13. "All I Can Say is Goodbye" (Marty Wilde, Ronnie Scott) – 3:11

== Personnel ==
- Charles Blackwell, Johnny Harris, Ken Woodman, Mike Vickers – musical direction
- Bill Price – engineer
- Grace Waring – photography

== Charts ==
Chart (1968–1969)	Peak position
Norwegian Albums (VG-lista)	1
UK Albums (Official Charts)	4
US Billboard 200	5

== Certifications ==
Region	Certification	Certified units/sales
United States (RIAA)	Gold	500,000^{^}
^{^} Shipments figures based on certification alone.
