= Greatest Hits (Tom Jones album) =

Tom Jones' Greatest Hits

Compilation album by Tom Jones
- Released: 1974
- Label: Decca

Tom Jones chronology
The Body and Soul of Tom Jones (1973)	Tom Jones' Greatest Hits (1974)	Somethin' 'Bout You Baby I Like (1974)

Professional ratings
Review scores
Source	Rating
AllMusic	4.5/5 stars

Tom Jones' Greatest Hits is a compilation album by Welsh singer Tom Jones, released in late 1973 on Decca Records (on Parrot Records in the United States and Canada).

The album spent 13 weeks on the UK albums chart in January–March and May 1974, peaking at number 15.

== Track listing ==
Side 1
No.	Title	Writer(s)	Length
1.	"It's Not Unusual"	Mills, Reed	1:59
2.	"(It Looks like) I'll Never Fall in Love Again"	Donegan, Currie	4:11
3.	"What's New Pussycat?"	David, Bacharach	2:04
4.	"Till"	Danvers, Sigman, Gaiano	2:15
5.	"Green, Green Grass of Home"	Putman	3:02
6.	"Love Me Tonight"	Pace, Pilat, Panzerui, Mason	3:10

Side 2
No.	Title	Writer(s)	Length
1.	"She's a Lady"	Anka	2:53
2.	"Funny Familiar Forgotten Feelings"	Newbury	2:55
3.	"Delilah"	Reed, Mason	3:20
4.	"I'm Coming Home"	Reed, Mason	3:07
5.	"Help Yourself"	Donida, Fishman, Mogol	2:54
6.	"Daughter of Darkness"	Reed, Stephens	3:16

== Charts ==
Chart (1974)	Peak position
UK Albums (Official Charts)	15
US Billboard 200	185
