= Darlin' (album) =

Studio album by Tom Jones
- Released: 1981
- Genre: Country
- Label: Mercury
- Producer: Steve Popovich, Bill Justis, Gordon Mills

Tom Jones chronology
Rescue Me (1979)	Darlin' (1981)	Tom Jones Country (1982)

Professional ratings
Review scores
Source	Rating
AllMusic	4.5/5 stars

Darlin' is a studio album by Welsh singer Tom Jones, released in 1981 by Mercury Records.

== Track listing ==
LP (Mercury SRM-1-4010)

Side 1
No.	Title	Length
1.	"Darlin'"	3:15
2.	"But I Do"	3:17
3.	"Lady Lay Down"	3:26
4.	"No Guarantee"	3:46
5.	"What in the World's Come over You"	2:50

Side 2
No.	Title	Length
1.	"One Night"	3:00
2.	"Daughter's Question"	4:14
3.	"I Don't Want to Know You That Well"	3:14
4.	"Dime Queen of Nevada"	3:20
5.	"The Things that Matter Most"	3:01
6.	"Come Home Rhondda Boy"	5:12

== Charts ==
Chart (1981)	Peak position
US Billboard 200	179
US Top Country Albums (Billboard)	19
