= Tom Jones (singer) =

Welsh singer (born 1940)

Sir Tom Jones OBE
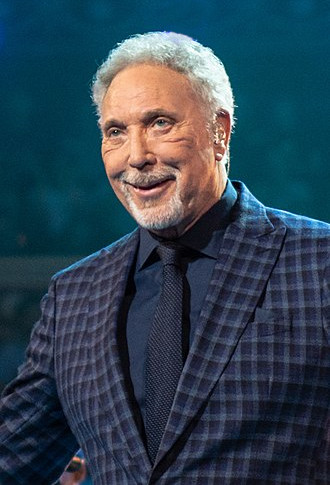
- Jones in 2018
- Born: Thomas John Woodward; 7 June 1940 (age 86); Treforest, Wales
- Occupation: Singer
- Years active: 1963–present
- Spouse: Linda Trenchard (m. 1957; died 2016)
- Children: 2
- Musical career
- Genres: Pop; R&B; soul; country; gospel
- Works: Tom Jones discography
- Labels: Columbia; Decca; Epic; Jive; Island; Mercury; Polydor; Interscope; V2; S-Curve; Virgin EMI
- Website: tomjones.com

Sir Thomas Jones Woodward (born Thomas John Woodward, 7 June 1940) is a Welsh singer. His career began with a string of top 10 hits in the 1960s and he has since toured regularly, with appearances in Las Vegas from 1967 to 2011. His voice has been described by AllMusic as a "full-throated, robust baritone".

Jones's performing range has included pop, R&B, show tunes, country, dance, soul, and gospel. In 2008, the New York Times called him a "musical shapeshifter [who could] slide from soulful rasp to pop croon, with a voice as husky as it was pretty". He has sold over 100 million records, with 36 Top 40 hits in the UK and 19 in the US, including "It's Not Unusual", "What's New Pussycat?", the theme song for the James Bond film Thunderball (1965), "Green, Green Grass of Home", "Delilah", "She's a Lady", "Sex Bomb", and a cover of Prince's "Kiss".

Jones has also occasionally dabbled in acting, first making his debut in the lead role of the television film Pleasure Cove (1979). He also appeared as himself in Tim Burton's film Mars Attacks! (1996). In 1970, he received a Golden Globe Award for Best Actor – Television Series Musical or Comedy nomination for hosting the television series This Is Tom Jones. In 2012, he played his first dramatic acting role in an episode of Playhouse Presents. He received a Grammy Award for Best New Artist in 1966, an MTV Video Music Award in 1989, and two Brit Awards: Best British Male in 2000 and Outstanding Contribution to Music in 2003. He was made an Officer of the Order of the British Empire (OBE) in 1998 and was knighted by Queen Elizabeth II in 2006 for services to music. He experienced a resurgence in popularity in the 2010s due to his role as a coach on the talent show The Voice UK (2012–2015, 2017–2026).

== Early life ==
Thomas John Woodward was born at 57 Kingsland Terrace in Treforest in Wales on 7 June 1940, the son of Freda Jones (1914–2003) and coal miner Thomas Woodward (1910–1981). He is primarily of English descent. His maternal grandfather was Welsh, and his maternal grandmother was born in Wales to English parents from Somerset and Wiltshire. His English paternal grandfather was from Gloucestershire, and his English paternal grandmother was from Wiltshire.

He attended Wood Road Infants School, Wood Road Junior School, and Pontypridd Central Secondary Modern School. He began singing at an early age; he would regularly sing at family gatherings, weddings, and in his school choir. He did not like school or sports, but gained confidence through his singing talent. At the age of 12, he was diagnosed with tuberculosis. Many years later, he said, "I spent two years in bed recovering. It was the worst time of my life." During this time, he could do little else but listen to music and draw.

== Career ==
=== Rise to fame ===
Jones's voice has been described as a "full-throated, robust baritone". According to Jones himself, his young voice was a tenor. He said: "What you lose on the top end, you gain on the bottom end. I used to be able to hit a top C when I was young now it's a B flat." He became the frontman in 1963 for Tommy Scott and the Senators, a Welsh beat group. They soon gained a local following and reputation in South Wales. In 1964, the group recorded several solo tracks with producer Joe Meek, who took them to various record labels, but they had little success. Later that year, Decca producer Peter Sullivan saw Tommy Scott and the Senators performing in a club and directed them to manager Phil Solomon, but the partnership was short-lived.

The group continued playing gigs around South Wales. Gordon Mills met Jones, became his manager, and introduced him to London, where Mills worked in music. Mills renamed him "Tom Jones", to exploit the popularity of the Academy Award-winning 1963 film.

Eventually, Mills got Jones a recording contract with Decca. His first single, "Chills and Fever", was released in late 1964. It did not chart, but the follow-up, "It's Not Unusual", became an international hit after offshore pirate radio station Radio Caroline promoted it. The following year was the most prominent of Jones's career, making him one of the most popular vocalists of the British Invasion. In early 1965, "It's Not Unusual" reached No. 1 in the United Kingdom and the top ten in the United States. During 1965, Mills secured a number of film themes for Jones to record, including the James Bond film Thunderball, and What's New Pussycat? (written by Burt Bacharach and Hal David). Jones was sceptical about the latter song when first approached about it. He said when it was offered to him, he felt it was "sort of a backhanded compliment: 'I've got to have you, but this is the song.'" Jones said it took convincing from Bacharach to perform "What's New Pussycat?":

"When I first heard it I thought, 'Christ! What the bloody hell do they want me to sing this for?' But Burt Bacharach explained, 'I want the big voice to sing this bloody crazy song.' And you put it on, it's a classic."

Jones was awarded the Grammy Award for Best New Artist in 1966. During a filming break at Paramount Studios (1965) in Hollywood, Jones met Elvis Presley for the first time; he recalls Presley singing, "With These Hands" as he walked towards him from the film set. The two men became good friends.

In 1966, Jones's popularity began to slip somewhat, causing Mills to reshape the singer's image into that of a crooner. Jones also began to sing broader material. He soon topped UK charts and reached the top 40 in US charts. Over the next few years he scored a string of hits on both sides of the Atlantic, including "I'll Never Fall in Love Again", "I'm Coming Home", and "Delilah", each of which reached No. 2 in the UK chart.

=== 1967 to 1987 ===
In 1967, Jones performed in Las Vegas for the first time, at the Flamingo. His performances and style of dress became part of his stage act, and increasingly featured his open, half-unbuttoned shirts and tight trousers. He soon chose to record less and focus on club performances. Jones played in Las Vegas at least one week each year until 2011.

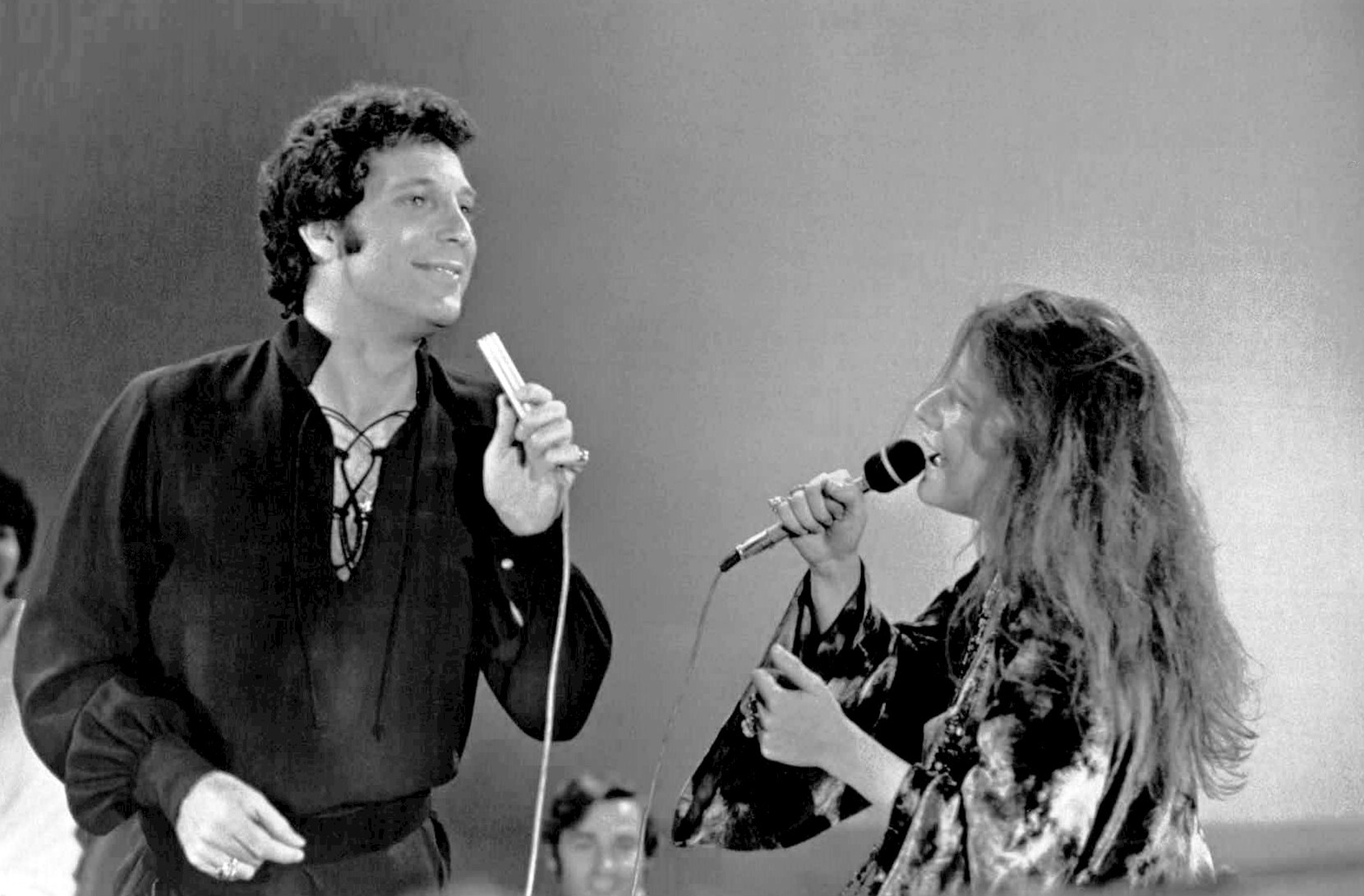
Jones singing a duet with Janis Joplin on the television programme This Is Tom Jones, 1969

Jones had an internationally successful television variety show titled This Is Tom Jones from 1969 to 1971. The Associated Television-produced show was worth a reported US$9,000,000 (equivalent to about $71,500,000 in 2025) to Jones over three years. It was broadcast by ITV in the UK and by the American Broadcasting Company in the US. As a result of the show, Jones was nominated in 1970 for a "best actor" Golden Globe. From 1980 to 1981, he had a second television variety show, Tom Jones, which was produced in Vancouver, Canada, and lasted 24 episodes.

Both television shows were the subject of litigation with the original licence holder C/F International. As of December 2004, C/F International was a secured judgement creditor of Classic World Productions and its principal, Darryl Payne, for approximately US$1,000,000 (equivalent to about $1,700,000 in 2025), and was the principal secured creditor at the time of the subsequent bankruptcy filing by the company. C/F International's action against Classic World Productions and owner Darryl Payne was based on unpaid royalty payments from This Is Tom Jones and related recordings. This Is Tom Jones is sold on DVD by Time Life rather than by Classic World Productions or C/F International.

C/F International's rights to later Tom Jones material were also disputed. In March 2007, Tom Jones and Tom Jones Enterprises sued C/F International to stop the company from licensing sound recordings made from the 1981 Tom Jones series. It was contended that any rights that C/F International had to license the Tom Jones show did not include the right to make and license separate recordings of the performances on the show, and that any rights that C/F International had in the Tom Jones show no longer existed because of numerous breaches of contract. Examples of contentious CDs are Live on the Tom Jones Show, released in 2006, and Greatest Hits Live, originally issued by C/F International in 1981 and later licensed to and issued by Prism Leisure Corporation as 30 Greatest Hits – Live in Concert.

On 26 April 1970, CBS released the Raquel Welch television special Raquel! directed by David Winters, and Jones is among the guests.

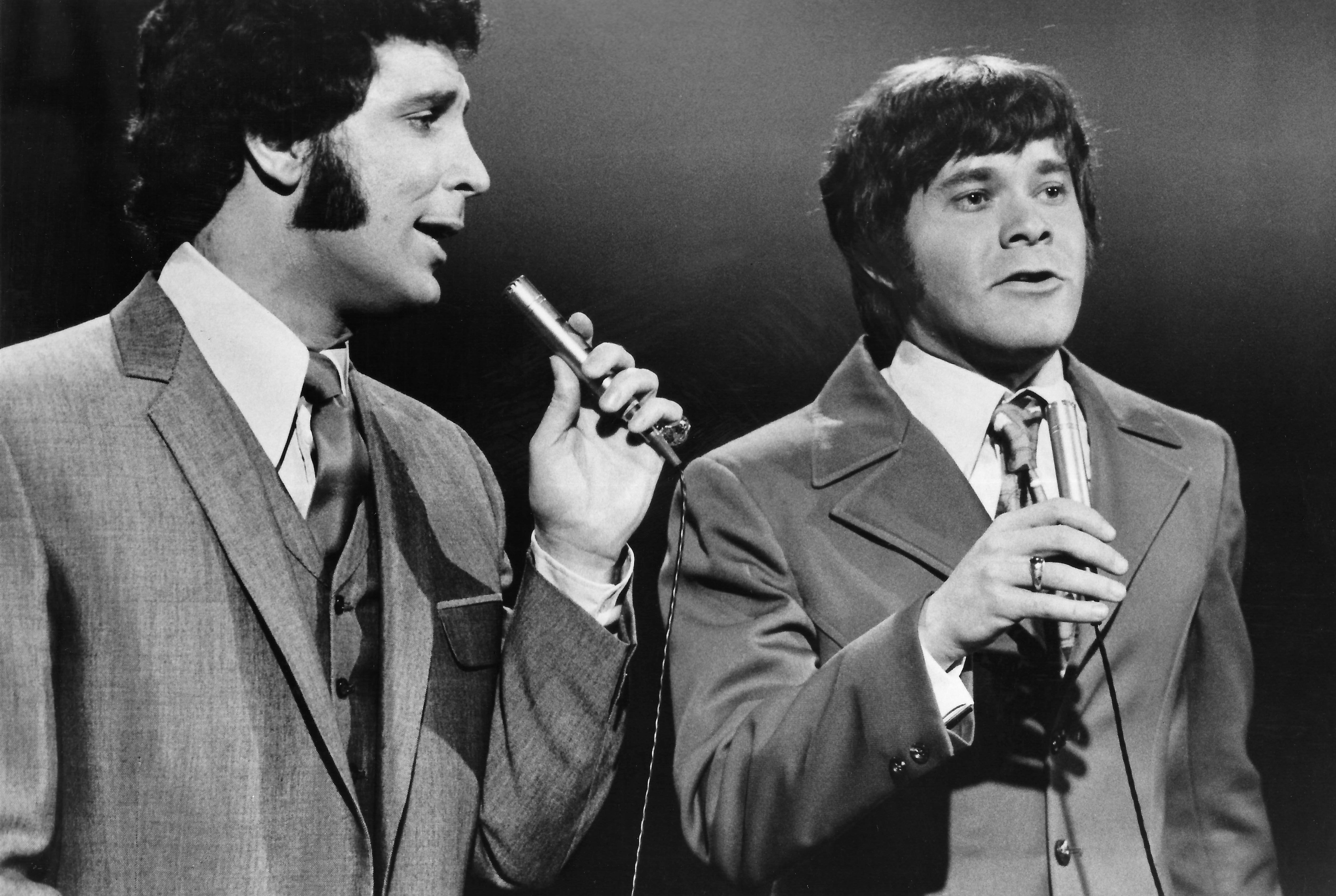
Jones (left) and Oliver performing on This Is Tom Jones in 1970.

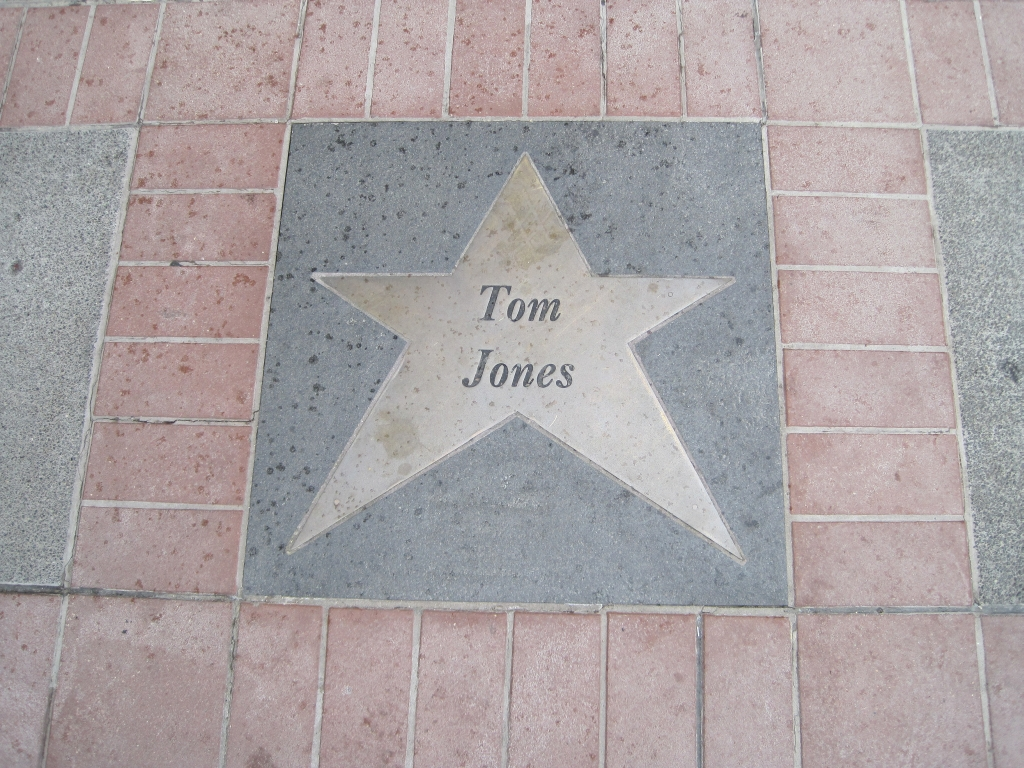
The star commemorating Jones at the Orpheum Theatre, Memphis

In the 1970s, Jones toured with the female singing groups Quiet Elegance and the Blossoms as his backing groups. He had a number of hit singles, including "She's a Lady", "Till", and "The Young New Mexican Puppeteer", but in the mid-1970s his popularity declined. He did, however, have a big hit in 1976 with "Say You'll Stay Until Tomorrow", which went to No. 1 on the US country chart, No. 15 on the Billboard Hot 100 and No. 40 on the UK Singles Chart.

In 1972, Jones co-starred with Jennifer O'Neill in David Winters's television special The Special London Bridge Special. Jones explained that he accepted to do the special because it allowed him to continue doing television without having the confinement of a series.

In 1976, Jones was set to make his film debut in the film Yockowald, in which he was to play a CIA assassin. The film was shelved after the production ran out of money three weeks into filming.

In 1979, Jones made his acting debut in Pleasure Cove, an ABC television film which was a pilot for a potential television series but was not picked up. In the film, he played a suave conman named Raymond Gordon staying at the holiday island resort of the title. His co-stars in the film included Constance Forslund, Tanya Roberts and David Hasselhoff. In 1984, he guest-starred in an episode of the television series Fantasy Island as an accountant who fantasises about living life as Dick Turpin.

In the early 1980s, Jones started to record country music. From 1980 to 1986, he had nine songs in the US country top 40, yet failed to crack the top 100 in the UK or the Billboard Hot 100. Jones's manager Gordon Mills died of cancer on 29 July 1986, and Jones's son Mark became his manager.

In 1987, Tom Jones re-entered the singles chart with "A Boy from Nowhere", which went to No. 2 in the UK. The following year, he covered Prince's "Kiss" with Art of Noise. The song reached No. 5 in the UK and No. 31 in the US. The video for "Kiss" was played frequently on MTV and VH1, and won the MTV Video Music Award for Breakthrough Video.

=== 1990s resurgence ===
Jones received a star on the Hollywood Walk of Fame in 1989, located at 6608 Hollywood Boulevard, Los Angeles, California, in front of Frederick's of Hollywood. He collaborated with Van Morrison on his album Carrying A Torch, released in 1991 on Dover Records, featuring Jones's cover of Morrison's title track. Partly recorded at Townhouse Studios in London, Morrison wrote and produced four songs for the album.

In 1992, he made his first appearance at the UK's Glastonbury Festival, and in 1993 he appeared as himself in episodes of two US sitcoms, The Fresh Prince of Bel-Air ("The Alma Matter") and The Simpsons ("Marge Gets a Job").

Jones signed with Interscope Records in 1993 and released the album The Lead and How to Swing It the following year. The first single, "If I Only Knew", went to No. 11 in the UK. Jones performed the song at the 1994 MTV Europe Music Awards, for which he also served as host. In 1997 Jones recorded a cover of Randy Newman song "You Can Leave Your Hat On" for the soundtrack of The Full Monty.

In 1996, Jones appeared as himself in Tim Burton's ensemble science-fiction comedy film Mars Attacks!. A scene in the film features him performing on stage when aliens attack and he manages to escape with a gun.

In 1999, Jones released the album Reload, a collection of cover duets with artists such as the Cardigans, Natalie Imbruglia, Cerys Matthews, Van Morrison, Mousse T, Portishead, Stereophonics and Robbie Williams. The album went to No. 1 in the UK and sold over 4 million copies worldwide. Five singles from Reload charted in the UK top 40. The single "Sex Bomb" was released in early 2000 and became the album's biggest single, reaching No. 3 on the UK Singles Chart.

=== Into the 21st century ===
US President Bill Clinton invited Jones to perform on New Year's Eve at the 2000 millennium celebrations in Washington, D.C. In 2000, Jones garnered a number of honours for his work, including a BRIT Award for Best British Male. He was also hired as the new voice of Australia's National Rugby League, singing in an advertisement to market the 2000 season.

Also that year, he voiced Theme Song Guy in the Disney animated comedy film The Emperor's New Groove, where he sang the song "Perfect World." In 2003, he appeared as himself and sang the theme song of the animated show, Duck Dodgers, based on the 1953 Looney Tunes short Duck Dodgers in the 24½th Century starring Daffy Duck.

In 2002, Jones released the album Mr. Jones, which was produced by Haitian-American rapper Wyclef Jean. The album and the first single, "Tom Jones International", were top 40 hits in the UK.

Jones received the Brit Award for Outstanding Contribution to Music in 2003. The following year he performed "You Can Leave Your Hat On" with the Pussycat Dolls and Carmen Electra on the seventh annual Vh1 Divas concert. The only male guest part of that year's line-up; which included Patti LaBelle, Gladys Knight, and Debbie Harry among many others; his cover of "Kiss" was included in an 80s finale medley. Later that year, he teamed up with pianist Jools Holland and released Tom Jones & Jools Holland, a roots rock 'n' roll album. It peaked at No. 5 in the UK.

On 28 May 2005, in celebration of his upcoming 65th birthday, Jones returned to his homeland to perform a concert in Ynysangharad Park, Pontypridd, before an audience of about 20,000. This was his first performance in Pontypridd since 1964. In 2005, the BBC reported that Jones was Wales's wealthiest entertainer, having amassed a fortune of £175,000,000. Jones collaborated with Australian pop singer John Farnham in 2005 and released the live album John Farnham & Tom Jones – Together in Concert. The following year, Jones worked with Chicane and released the dance track "Stoned in Love", which went to No. 7 in the UK Singles Chart.

Jones, who had been made an Officer of the Order of the British Empire (OBE) in 1999, was knighted by Queen Elizabeth II in 2006 at Buckingham Palace for his services to music. After receiving a knighthood, Jones stated: "When you first come into show business and get a hit record, it is the start of something. As time goes by it just gets better. This is the best thing I have had. It's a wonderful feeling, a heady feeling."

=== 2007–2009 ===
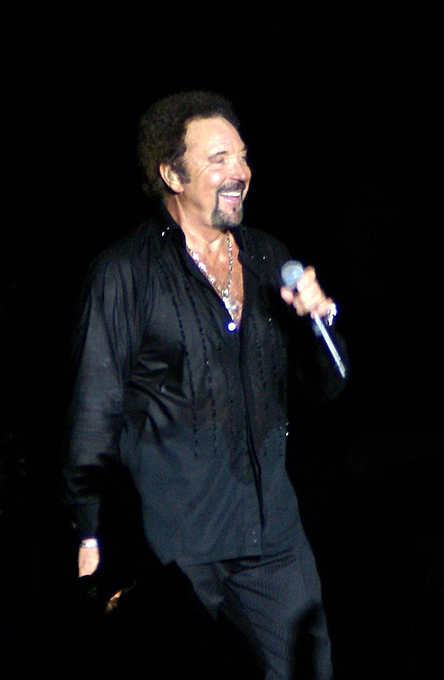
Performing at Hampton Court Palace in London, 2007

On 1 July 2007, Jones was among the artists who performed at Wembley Stadium at the Concert for Diana, joined on stage by guitarist Joe Perry of Aerosmith and soul singer Joss Stone. In addition to performing some of his own songs, the group covered the Arctic Monkeys song "I Bet You Look Good on the Dancefloor". A boxing fan, Jones has performed national anthems before a number of boxing matches. He sang "God Save the Queen", the national anthem of the United Kingdom, before the Floyd Mayweather-Ricky Hatton fight in 2007; he sang "Hen Wlad Fy Nhadau", the Welsh national anthem, at the Bernard Hopkins-Joe Calzaghe fight between fellow Welshman Joe Calzaghe and Bernard Hopkins in 2008; and he sang "God Save the Queen" before the Manny Pacquiao-Ricky Hatton fight in 2009.

In 2008, he released 24 Hours on S-Curve Records, his first album of new material to be issued in the United States for over 15 years. Jones, who was still performing over 200 dates a year as he approached his seventieth birthday, set out on a world tour to promote the album. "The fire is still in me. Not to be an oldie, but a goodie. I want to be a contender", Jones said. Also in 2008, Jones was inducted into the Hit Parade Hall of Fame. On 16 November 2008, he was invited to perform on BBC's Strictly Come Dancing; he performed the debut single from 24 Hours, "If He Should Ever Leave You", which was named the ninth-best song of 2008 by Spinner. One of the songs from 24 Hours, "Give a Little Love", would later be featured in the first trailer for the 2010 comedy film, Little Fockers.

In March 2009, Jones went to the top of the UK Music Charts for the third time in his career with a novelty cover "(Barry) Islands in the Stream", sung with Ruth Jones, Rob Brydon and Robin Gibb, the latter who co-wrote the original "Islands in the Stream" with his brothers Barry and Maurice. The record, which was inspired by the song's having featured in the BBC's hit sitcom Gavin & Stacey, was released in aid of Comic Relief and reached No. 1 in March 2009. This was his first UK chart topper since "Green, Green Grass of Home" in 1967, setting a new record of 42 years between two UK number ones; this record would be surpassed by Kate Bush when "Running Up That Hill" topped the charts in 2022, a 44-year gap between number ones.

=== 2010–2020 ===
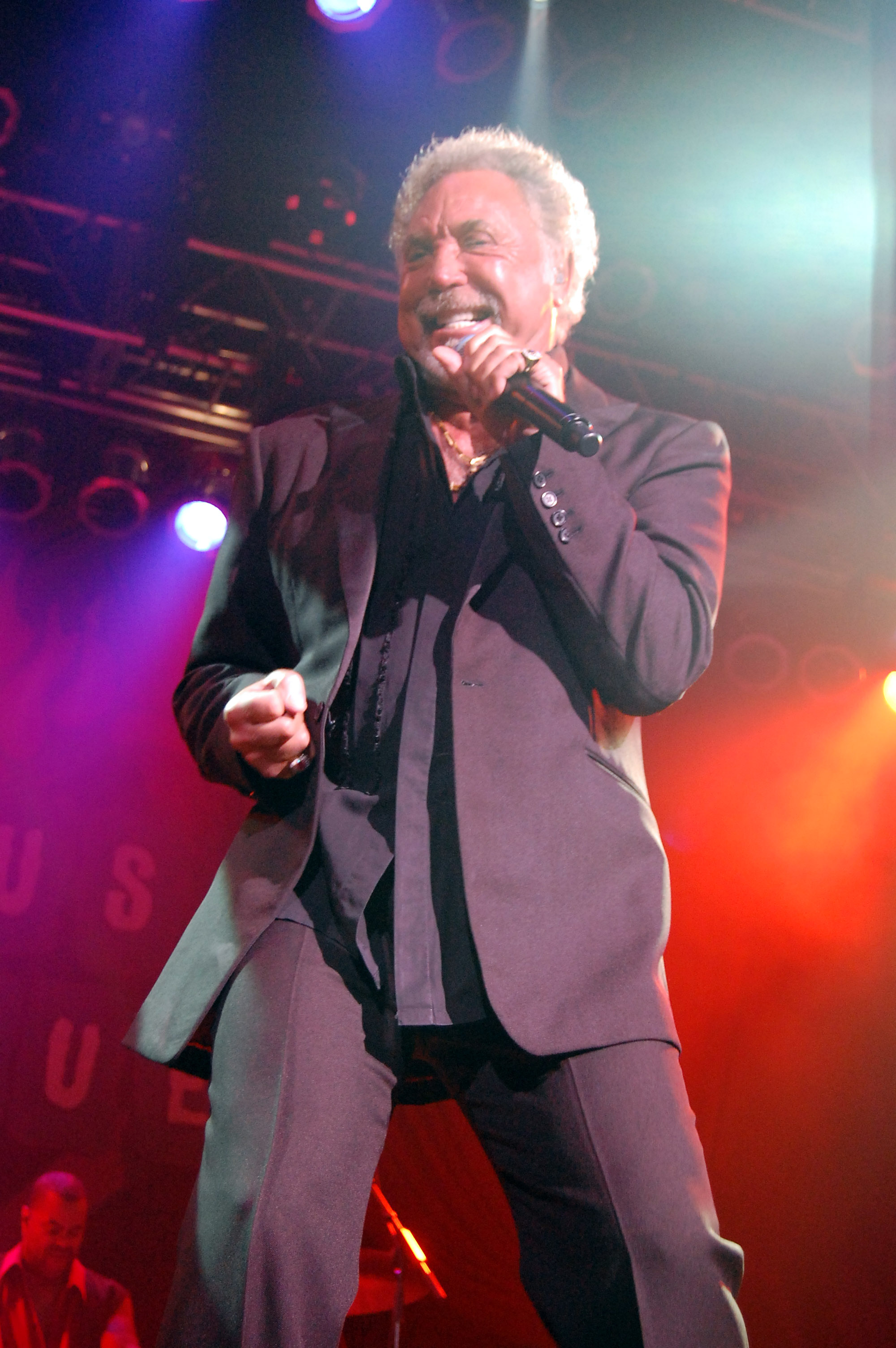
Jones at House of Blues, Anaheim, 2009

Jones's album Praise & Blame was released on 26 July 2010. The album, consisting primarily of gospel and blues songs, included covers of songs by Bob Dylan, John Lee Hooker and Billy Joe Shaver, and featured guest musicians such as Booker T.

On 7 June 2010, which was Jones's seventieth birthday, the single "Burning Hell", a cover of the John Lee Hooker song from the Praise & Blame album, was released. In July 2010, it was reported that David Sharpe, vice-president of Island Records (to whom Jones had moved, from EMI, for £1.5m in October 2009), had told his colleagues over email to "pull back this project immediately or get my money back" and asked whether the spiritually themed record had been a "sick joke". Jones later strongly criticised Sharpe and said that he was furious about the leaked email.

In July 2010 Jones appeared on the penultimate episode of Friday Night with Jonathan Ross and performed "Burning Hell". In August 2010, Praise & Blame debuted at No. 2 on the UK album chart. By 2010 Jones had sold a total of over 100 million records.

On 11 September 2010 Jones performed for an audience of 50,000 at the Help for Heroes charity concert at Twickenham Stadium performing "Strange Things Are Happening Every Day" and his hit "Green, Green Grass of Home". On 22 September, Jones appeared on the Late Show with David Letterman at the Ed Sullivan Theater in New York.

In May 2011 Jones appeared as a guest vocalist on the debut album Let Them Talk by Hugh Laurie. On 15 May 2011, he appeared alongside Laurie in the UK ITV series Perspectives, singing music from the album in New Orleans. On 25 May 2011, he appeared on American Idol after a medley of his hits performed by the American Idol "Top 13".

Jones released a single on 19 March 2012, produced by former White Stripes frontman Jack White, called Evil. The single was first made available through independent record shops in 7" vinyl format on 5 March. An exclusive three-coloured vinyl was also sold at only one shop – Spillers Records in Cardiff. The shop, which Jones visited as a boy, was founded in 1894 and is listed in Guinness World Records as the world's oldest record shop.

Jones experienced a resurgence in notability in the 2010s due to his coaching role on the BBC talent show The Voice UK from 2012 (with the exception of 2016). In March 2012 he became a coach on the show and was joined by will.i.am, Jessie J and Danny O'Donoghue. He mentored Leanne Mitchell to win the first series. Jones returned to coach in 2013, 2014 and 2015. In August 2015, it was announced that Jones's contract with the show would not be renewed and that he would be replaced by Boy George. Jones criticised BBC executives for "sub-standard behaviour", having not consulted with him and informing him only 24 hours before the official announcement.

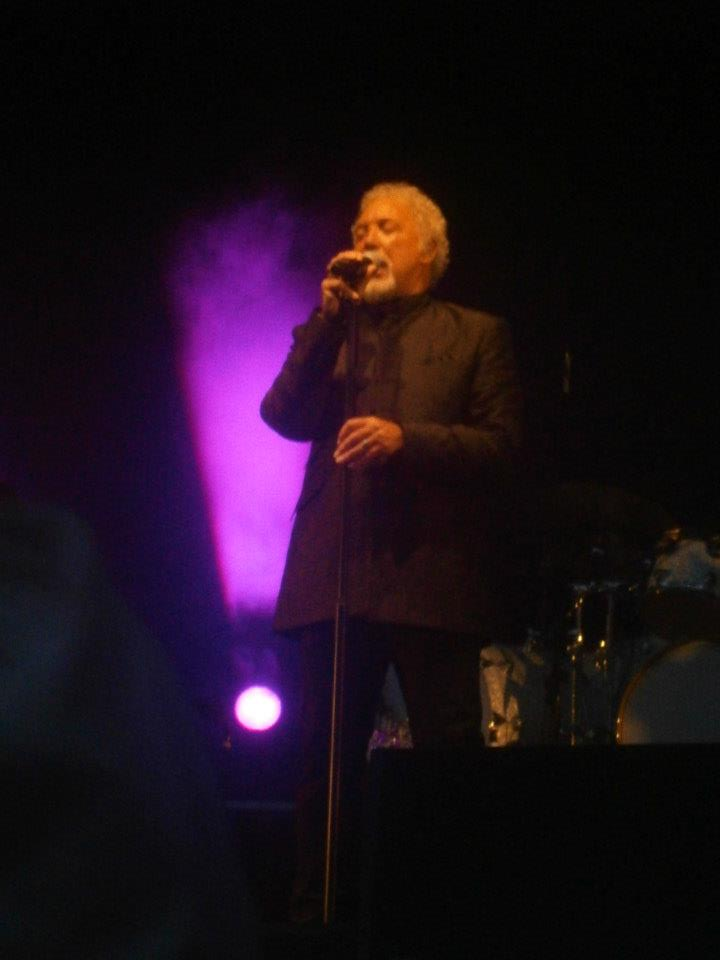
Jones at the Turku Castle in Turku, Finland, 2012

In May 2012 Jones released the album Spirit in the Room on Island Records/Universal Music. The track listing included covers of songs by Paul McCartney, Paul Simon, Leonard Cohen and Richard and Linda Thompson, Blind Willie Johnson, Tom Waits and the Low Anthem. Also in May, he starred in a one-off television drama titled "King of the Teds" which aired on Sky Arts as part of a series of standalone teleplays for Playhouse Presents. On 4 June Jones performed at the Queen's Diamond Jubilee Concert in front of Buckingham Palace, singing "Delilah" and "Mama Told Me Not to Come". On 18 August Jones performed a fifty-minute set at the V Festival's Weston Park site in Staffordshire. On 9 September 2012, Jones headlined at BBC Radio 2's Live in Hyde Park festival.

In May 2014 Jones opened for Morrissey at a special show in the United States. On 27 September 2014, Jones performed at the Australian Football League's pre-game entertainment for the 2014 Grand Final along with Ed Sheeran.

In September 2015 Jones announced the long-awaited release of his album Long Lost Suitcase, on 9 October, through Virgin/EMI. The album was the last in a trilogy, following Praise & Blame (2010) and Spirit in the Room (2012). The track titles are included in chapters of Jones' autobiography Over the Top and Back which was released at the same time. The album was produced by Ethan Johns and included songs by Gillian Welch, the Rolling Stones, Hank Williams and the Milk Carton Kids.

In November 2015 Jones appeared, alongside Rob Brydon, in a special 90-minute show, from the SSE Arena, Wembley, for BBC's Children in Need. In December 2015 he appeared on the BBC's Jools' Annual Hootenanny, on duetting with Paul Weller.

In 2017 Jones returned to The Voice as a coach for series 6, his fifth year on the show. In series 7, Ruti Olajugbagbe picked Jones as her coach and together they made it all the way to the finale, where Olajugbagbe was announced as the series 7 winner. In 2018 he embarked on a live summer tour, which was planned to run from 1 May to 11 August. In July, however, many shows were cancelled due to sickness or bad weather.

In 2020 Jones again appeared on the BBC's Jools' Annual Hootenanny, broadcast on New Year's Eve, on which he duetted with Jools Holland and with Celeste.

=== 2021–present ===
In January 2021 Jones announced Surrounded by Time, his fourth covers album to be produced by Ethan Johns, alongside the release of a new single, his rendition of Todd Snider's "Talking Reality Television Blues". In March he appeared on Later... with Jools Holland where he sang "I'm Growing Old" from that album. The album was released on 23 April.

On 17 and 18 June 2022 Jones appeared at the Principality Stadium in Cardiff alongside Stereophonics, whose Saturday concert was broadcast live on BBC Two.

On 3 September 2022, Jones performed "I Won't Crumble With You If You Fall", taken from his Surrounded by Time album, on The Voice UK. After the performance, Jones explained the meaning behind the song: "My wife, she was dying of lung cancer [...] I was always able to fix stuff, I was always able to do things, if she needed me for anything I was always there, but she said 'you can't crumble with me, don't fall with me now, you've done everything you can, you must carry on and do what you do' [...] When I heard it I thought, 'My God it's like this was written for this situation'. It's a lovely song." Within 24 hours, the song had peaked on the UK iTunes chart at number 1. The song debuted at number 3 on the UK Official Singles Downloads Chart on 9 September 2022.

During the series 11 blind auditions of Jones' tenth year on The Voice UK, the first contestant was Anthonia Edwards, who received a four-chair turn from the coaches. Edwards chose Jones as her coach and, on 29 October 2022, was announced as the winner of the series, making Jones the first coach to mentor three winners on the programme.

In September 2026, Jones confirmed that he would not return as a coach for series 15 of The Voice UK, having been "fired" by ITV as part of an effort to "refresh" the show. Jones stated that he did not want to leave, adding that "there's never a good time to fire an 86-year-old who's still pretty good at his job". His final artist in series 14, Cate McHugh, won the season, giving Jones his fourth and final win as a coach on The Voice UK.

== Personal life ==
Jones was married to his school girlfriend, Melinda Rose "Linda" Trenchard, from 2 March 1957 until her death from cancer on 10 April 2016. They were married at the age of 16 when she became pregnant; their son, Mark, was born shortly after the wedding. To support his young family, Jones worked in construction and at a glove factory before finding success as a singer. He stayed married to Trenchard despite his many well-publicised infidelities. After his wife's death, Jones sold the family's Los Angeles mansion and its contents, apart from treasured photos, and moved into an apartment in London, which was his wife's dying wish.

Jones has stated that he had sex with up to 250 groupies a year at his peak of fame. He had affairs with American women such as singer Mary Wilson, presenter Charlotte Laws, and former Miss World Marjorie Wallace, engaged at the time to American race car driver Peter Revson. Actress Cassandra Peterson, better known as her character Elvira, Mistress of the Dark, revealed in 2008 that she lost her virginity to Jones, calling the experience "painful and horrible" and stating that she required stitches afterwards.

One of Jones's affairs resulted in a son. While on tour in the United States in October 1987, he had a brief relationship with model Katherine Berkery, who later discovered she was pregnant. After a legal battle that included DNA testing, a US court ruled in 1989 that Jones was the boy's father. He denied the court's findings until 2008, when he admitted they were true, but expressed no interest in meeting his son, singer Jonathan Berkery. The boy was in a boy band called 5th Ring, with drag queen Tina Burner.

Following the UK's 1974 election of a Labour government, Jones became a tax exile to avoid a 98% income tax. In 1976, he purchased the mansion at 363 Copa De Oro Road in the East Gate Bel Air area of Los Angeles from Dean Martin for $500,000. He sold it to Nicolas Cage in 1998 for a reported $6.4 million.

Jones met his idol Elvis Presley in 1965 at the Paramount film stage, when Elvis was filming Paradise, Hawaiian Style. They became good friends, spending more time together in Las Vegas singing and carousing until the early hours at Presley's private suite. The friendship endured until Presley's death in 1977. One year after the death of Jones' wife, rumours began that he had started dating Presley's wife Priscilla. In 2021, he said they had known each other since the 1960s and simply enjoyed spending time together. People had thought they were dating because they had been seen together dining and at Jeff Franklin's house.

In 2015, Jones' autobiography Over the Top and Back was published by Michael Joseph. Reviewing the book in the Daily Express, Clair Woodward said, "In the tradition of so many autobiographies these days, Tom Jones's doesn't tell you what you really want to hear. [...] What you are left with is a riotously enjoyable story of Jones 'The Voice' which nicely doubles as the story of British pop and light entertainment from the Sixties onwards." In 2021, Jones said that he uses inversion therapy to stay in good health.

== Artistry and influence ==
Jones' singing style developed out of the sound of American soul music. His early influences included blues, R&B, and rock and roll singers such as Little Richard, Solomon Burke, Jackie Wilson, Brook Benton, Elvis Presley (his idol and later close friend), and Jerry Lee Lewis. Another early influence was country musician Hank Williams.

Space and Cerys Matthews released "The Ballad of Tom Jones", a song about a fighting couple who are calmed down by listening to Jones's music on the radio. The song reached No. 4 in the UK in 1998.

A musical, Tom: A Story of Tom Jones, based on his life and recordings, produced by Theatr na nÓg, opened at the Wales Millennium Centre in March 2016. Another jukebox musical, What's New Pussycat? based on Henry Fielding's 1749 novel The History of Tom Jones, a Foundling (set in the 1960s) which uses Jones' music opened at the Birmingham Repertory Theatre in October 2021 to critical acclaim. It is written by Joe DiPietro, directed by Luke Sheppard, and choreographed by Arlene Phillips.

Similar to Presley with his impersonators, Jones has his own imitators around the world.

In the 2006 film Flushed Away, the main character, Roddy, is mistaken for Jones by another character while Roddy performs "She's a Lady". Jones' song, "What's New Pussycat?", is played during the ending credits.

In the tie-in comics for the video game Team Fortress 2, Jones is referenced several times. The Scout character falsely believes that Jones is his father, and has invested all his savings in Tom Jones merchandise. Jones is then murdered by the Soldier character out of jealousy when he discovers Jones has moved in with his former roommate. In the penultimate issue, as the Scout is bleeding to death, the Spy disguises himself as Jones using his shapeshifting ability to tell Scout that he is proud of him. Scout is shown to have a "Sex Bomb"-themed tattoo on his chest. He then awakens in Heaven, where the real Jones appears. In the final issue, Soldier collects a brick from Jones's former home so that his ghost can haunt it. Jones's ghost can be seen singing in the background of the series's closing Christmas dinner scene.

== Discography ==
Studio albums

- Along Came Jones (1965, UK)
- It's Not Unusual (1965, US)
- What's New Pussycat? (1965, US)
- A-tom-ic Jones (1966, UK & US versions different)
- From the Heart (1966, UK)
- Green, Green Grass of Home (1967, UK & US versions different)
- Funny Familiar Forgotten Feelings (1967, US)
- 13 Smash Hits (1967, UK)
- The Tom Jones Fever Zone (1968, US)
- Delilah (1968, UK)
- Help Yourself (1968)
- This Is Tom Jones (1969)
- Tom (1970)
- I Who Have Nothing (1970)
- She's a Lady (1971)
- Tom Jones Close Up (1972)
- The Body and Soul of Tom Jones (1973)
- Somethin' 'Bout You Baby I Like (1974)
- Memories Don't Leave Like People Do (1975)
- Say You'll Stay Until Tomorrow (1977)
- What a Night (1977)
- Do You Take This Man (1979)
- Rescue Me (1979)
- Darlin' (1981)
- Tom Jones Country (1982)
- Don't Let Our Dreams Die Young (1983)
- Love Is on the Radio (1984)
- Tender Loving Care (1985)
- At This Moment (titled Move Closer in the US) (1989)
- Carrying a Torch (1991)
- The Lead and How to Swing It (1994)
- Reload (1999)
- Mr. Jones (2002)
- Tom Jones & Jools Holland (with Jools Holland) (2004)
- 24 Hours (2008)
- Praise & Blame (2010)
- Spirit in the Room (2012)
- Long Lost Suitcase (2015)
- Surrounded by Time (2021)

Live albums

- Tom Jones Live! At the Talk of the Town (1967)
- Tom Jones Live in Las Vegas (1969)
- Tom Jones Live at Caesar's Palace (1971)
- John Farnham & Tom Jones – Together in Concert (with John Farnham) (2005)
- Tom Jones (promotional The Mail on Sunday CD) (2010)

Box sets

- The Definitive Tom Jones (2003)
- The Complete Decca Studio Albums Collection (2020)

== Compositions ==
Jones wrote or co-wrote the following songs: "And I Tell the Sea", "Looking Out My Window", "Feel the Rain" from the 2002 Mr. Jones album, "Jezebel", "The Letter", "Younger Days", "Tom Jones International", "Holiday", "The Road", "24 Hours", "Seasons", "We Got Love", "Seen That Face", "Give a Little Love", "If He Should Ever Leave You", "Whatever it Takes", and "Traveling Shoes" from the 2012 album Spirit in the Room.

== Filmography ==
Year	Title	Role	Notes
1965	What's New Pussycat?	Theme Singer	
1965	Promise Her Anything	Theme Singer	
1965	Thunderball	Theme Singer	
1972	The Special London Bridge Special		A fantasy story about London Bridge being brought to America
1974	On Happiness Island		BBC special
1979	Pleasure Cove	Raymond Gordon	US TV Movie
1984	Fantasy Island	Dick Turpin	(ABC series; season 7, episode 19)
1987	The Grand Knockout Tournament	as himself	TV special
1991	The Ghosts of Oxford Street	Gordon Selfridge	Christmas TV Movie celebrating the 200th anniversary of London's Oxford Street
1992	The Simpsons	as himself	"Marge Gets a Job"
1993	Fresh Prince of Bel-Air	as himself	Season 3 episode 18 : The Alma Matter
1994	Silk n' Sabotage	Photographer	
1995	The Jerky Boys: The Movie	as himself	
1996	Mars Attacks!	as himself	
1999	Agnes Browne	as himself	
2000	The Emperor's New Groove	Theme Song Guy	Animated film
2004	Duck Dodgers	as himself	"Talent Show A Go-Go"
2012	Playhouse Presents	as himself	Episode: "King of the Teds"
2012–15, 2017–26	The Voice UK	as himself	Coach or "judge" and mentor for artists, Seasons 1 until 4 and 6 until 14
2014	Under Milk Wood	Captain Cat	TV film
2014	Superheroes Unite for BBC Children in Need	as himself	TV film

== Accolades ==
=== Amadeus Austrian Music Awards ===
Year	Nominee / work	Award	Result	Ref.
2001	Reload	Best International Pop/Rock Male	Nominated	

=== Brit Awards ===
Year	Nominee / work	Award	Result	Ref.
1977	Himself	British Male Solo Artist	Nominated	
1989	"Kiss" (with Art of Noise)	British Single of the Year	Nominated	
1995	"If I Only Knew"	British Single of the Year	Nominated	
2000	Himself	British Male Solo Artist	Won	
2003	Himself	Outstanding Contribution to Music	Won	
2010	The Full Monty Performance	Live Performance of 30 Years	Nominated	

=== Danish Music Awards ===
Year	Nominee / work	Award	Result
1995	Himself	Best International Male	Won

=== NME Awards ===
Year	Nominee / work	Award	Result	Ref.
1968	Himself	Best Male Singer – UK	Won	
1969	Himself	Best Male Singer – UK	Won	

=== NRJ Music Awards ===
Year	Nominee / work	Award	Result	Ref.
2001	"Sex Bomb"	International Song of the Year	Nominated	

=== Silver Clef Awards ===
Year	Nominee / work	Award	Result	Ref.
2001	Himself	Silver Clef Award	Won	
2014	Himself	Outstanding Achievement Award	Won	

- 1966: Grammy Award for Best New Artist
- 1966: Grammy Award nomination for Contemporary Rock & Roll Male Vocal Performance for "What's New Pussycat?"
- 1966: Grammy Award nomination for Contemporary Rock & Roll Single for "It's Not Unusual"
- 1970: Golden Globe Award for Best Actor – Television Series Musical or Comedy for This Is Tom Jones
- 1970: Ivor Novello Award for International Artist of the Year
- 1989: MTV Video Music Award – Breakthrough Video for "Kiss"
- 1989: Star on the Hollywood Walk of Fame
- 1999: appointed an Officer of the Order of the British Empire (OBE)
- 2006: Knighthood for "services to music"
- 2017: Bambi Award in the category "legend"

== See also ==
- List of Welsh musicians

Preceded by Shirley Bassey; Goldfinger, 1964	James Bond title artist Thunderball, 1965	Succeeded by Nancy Sinatra; You Only Live Twice, 1967
