= This Is Tom Jones (album) =

Studio album by Tom Jones
- Released: 1969
- Label: Decca
- Producer: Peter Sullivan

Tom Jones chronology
Help Yourself (1968)	This Is Tom Jones (1969)	Tom Jones Live in Las Vegas (1969)

Professional ratings
Review scores
Source	Rating
AllMusic	4/5 stars

This Is Tom Jones is a studio album by Welsh singer Tom Jones, released in 1969 on Decca Records (on Parrot Records in the United States and Canada).

The album spent 20 weeks on the UK official albums chart, peaking at number 2.

== Track listing ==
Side 1
No.	Title	Writer(s)	Length
1.	"Fly Me to the Moon (In Other Words)"	Howard
2.	"Little Green Apples"	Russell
3.	"Wichita Lineman"	Webb
4.	"(Sitting On) The Dock of the Bay"	Redding, Cropper
5.	"Dance of Love"	Rich
6.	"Hey Jude"	Lennon, McCartney

Side 2
No.	Title	Writer(s)	Length
1.	"Without You"	Mason
2.	"That's All Any Man Can Say"	Macaulay, Macleod
3.	"That Wonderful Sound"	Stevens, Reed
4.	"Only Once"	Westlake
5.	"I'm a Fool to Want You"	Sinatra, Wolfe, Herron
6.	"Let It Be Me"	Becaud, Curtis, Delanoe

== Charts ==
Chart (1969)	Peak position
UK Albums (OCC)	5
US Billboard 200	4

== Certifications ==
Region	Certification	Certified units/sales
United States (RIAA)	Gold	500,000^{^}
^{^} Shipments figures based on certification alone.
