= Tom (Tom Jones album) =

Studio album by Tom Jones
- Released: 1970
- Label: Decca
- Producer: Peter Sullivan

Tom Jones chronology
Tom Jones Live in Las Vegas (1969)	Tom (1970)	I Who Have Nothing (1970)

Singles from Tom
- 1. "Without Love" Released: 13 December 1969

Professional ratings
Review scores
Source	Rating
AllMusic	3/5 stars

Tom is a studio album by Welsh singer Tom Jones, released in 1970 on Decca Records (on Parrot Records in the United States and Canada).

The album spent 18 weeks on the UK official albums chart, peaking at number 4.

== Track listing ==
Side 1
No.	Title	Writer(s)	Length
1.	"I Can't Turn You Loose"	Redding
2.	"Polk Salad Annie"	White
3.	"Proud Mary"	Fogerty
4.	"Sugar, Sugar"	Kim, Barry
5.	"Venus"	Robbie van Leeuwen
6.	"I Thank You"	Hayes

Side 2
No.	Title	Writer(s)	Length
1.	"Without Love"	Small (Arr. by Charles Blackwell)
2.	"You've Lost That Lovin' Feelin'"	Mann, Weil, Spector
3.	"If I Ruled the World"	Ornadel, Bricusse
4.	"Can't Stop Loving You"	Waddington, Bickerton
5.	"The Impossible Dream"	Darion, Leigh
6.	"Let There Be Love"	B. R. M. Gibb

== Charts ==
Chart (1970)	Peak position
UK Albums (OCC)	4
US Billboard 200	6

== Certifications ==
Region	Certification	Certified units/sales
United States (RIAA)	Gold	500,000^{^}
^{^} Shipments figures based on certification alone.
