= Tom Jones Live in Las Vegas =

Live in Las Vegas

Live album by Tom Jones
- Released: November 1969
- Recorded: Summer 1969
- Venue: Flamingo Hotel, Las Vegas, Nevada
- Length: 44:07
- Label: Parrot Records
- Producer: Peter Sullivan

Tom Jones chronology
This Is Tom Jones (1969)	Live in Las Vegas (1969)	Tom (1970)

Professional ratings
Review scores
Source	Rating
AllMusic	4.5/5 stars

Tom Jones Live in Las Vegas is a live album recorded at The Flamingo Hotel in Las Vegas, Nevada during the summer of 1969, and released in November 1969.

Performed and recorded during one of the peaks of his popularity, due to his TV series, This is Tom Jones (from 1969 to 1971) and several hit singles in the late 1960s ("It's Not Unusual", "What's New Pussycat?", "Green, Green Grass of Home", "Love Me Tonight"), Tom Jones and his accompanying band, led by Johnnie Spence, gave a tight and highly energetic performance. Jones' band featured some of the top studio musicians of the day, including Big Jim Sullivan on guitar and Chris Slade (The Firm, AC/DC) on drums. Jones acknowledged these musicians to the audience at the beginning of the sixth track, "Danny Boy" - stating "I brought with me from England three of the finest musicians that we have there...on drums, we have Chris, on bass, we have John, and on lead guitar, we have Jimmy." Typically a harsh critic of inferior music, Buddy Rich, on The Mike Douglas Show in 1971, stated "The band that plays behind Tom Jones is one of the great bands of all time."

The last track on Side 1, "I'll Never Fall in Love Again", is the 45 single released in 1967, but in a slightly different mix and has applause overdubbed in the studio. The reason for the inclusion of this track is because it had never previously been on a Jones album.

This record was another bonus to Jones' career, peaking at #2 in the UK and #3 in the US. It remains his highest charting album in the United States.

== Track listing ==
Side one
No.	Title	Writer(s)	Length
1.	"Turn On Your Love Light"	Deadric Malone; Joseph Scott	2:10
2.	"Bright Lights and You Girl"	Sayde Shepard	2:27
3.	"I Can't Stop Loving You"	Don Gibson	3:40
4.	"Hard to Handle"	Allen Jones; Alvertis Isbell; Otis Redding	2:24
5.	"Delilah"	Barry Mason; Les Reed	3:25
6.	"Danny Boy"	Frederic Weatherly; arranged by Charles Blackwell	4:13
7.	"I'll Never Fall in Love Again"	Jimmy Currie; Lonnie Donegan	4:15

Side two
No.	Title	Writer(s)	Length
8.	"Help Yourself"	Carlo Donida; Jack Fishman	2:25
9.	"Yesterday"	John Lennon; Paul McCartney	3:20
10.	"Hey Jude"	John Lennon; Paul McCartney	3:43
11.	"Love Me Tonight"	Barry Mason; Daniele Pace; Lorenzo Pilat; Mario Panzeri	2:56
12.	"It's Not Unusual"	Gordon Mills; Les Reed	2:28
13.	"Twist and Shout"	Bert Russell; Phil Medley	6:41

== Personnel ==
- Tom Jones – lead vocals
- Johnnie Spence – conductor, arranger
- John Rostill – bass guitar
- Big Jim Sullivan – lead guitar
- Chris Slade – drums

Technical

- Terry O'Neill - photography

== Certifications ==
Region	Certification	Certified units/sales
Canada (Music Canada)	2× Platinum	200,000^{^}
United States (RIAA)	Gold	500,000^{^}
^{^} Shipments figures based on certification alone.
