= The Young New Mexican Puppeteer =

Single by Tom Jones

from the album Close Up
- B-side: "All That I Need Is Some Time"
- Released: March 1972
- Label: Decca (UK); Parrot (USA)
- Songwriters: Earl Shuman and Leon Carr
- Producer: Gordon Mills

Tom Jones UK singles chronology
"Till" (1971)	"The Young New Mexican Puppeteer" (1972)	"Letter to Lucille" (1973)

"The Young New Mexican Puppeteer" is a song written by Earl Shuman and Leon Carr, and released as a single by Tom Jones. The guitarist on the single is Big Jim Sullivan.

== Song background ==
The song tells the story of a puppeteer from New Mexico, who uses puppets to encourage social and political change. The melody of the song's chorus is adapted from the score of the 1940 Disney film Pinocchio.

== Chart performance ==
It reached #6 on the UK Singles Chart, and was a minor hit in the US, peaking at #14 on the Easy Listening chart and #80 on the Billboard Hot 100 in May 1972.

== Cover versions ==
German Schlager singer Roberto Blanco released a German version of the song in 1972 with the title Der Puppenspieler von Mexiko. It reached the peak position 49 in the German charts.
