= The Body and Soul of Tom Jones =

Studio album by Tom Jones
- Released: 1973
- Genres: Pop, country
- Label: Decca
- Producer: Gordon Mills

Tom Jones chronology
Tom Jones Close Up (1972)	The Body and Soul of Tom Jones (1973)	Greatest Hits (1973)

Professional ratings
Review scores
Source	Rating
Billboard	positive (a "Top Album Pick")
AllMusic	2/5 stars

The Body and Soul of Tom Jones is a studio album by Welsh singer Tom Jones, released in 1973 on Decca Records (on Parrot Records in the United States and Canada).

The album spent one week on the UK official albums chart at number 31.

== Track listing ==
Side 1
No.	Title	Writer(s)	Length
1.	"Runnin' Bear"	Richardson
2.	"Ain't No Sunshine When She's Gone"	Withers
3.	"(If Loving You Is Wrong) I Don't Want to Be Right"	Hampton, Banks, Jackson
4.	"Since I Loved You Last"	Shuman, Carr
5.	"Lean on Me"	Withers

Side 2
No.	Title	Writer(s)	Length
1.	"Letter to Lucille"	Macaulay
2.	"Today I Started Loving You Again"	Haggard
3.	"I'll Share My World with You"	Wilson
4.	"I Still Love You Enough (to Love You All Over Again)"	Mareno
5.	"Ballad of Billie Joe"	Rich

== Charts ==
Chart (1973)	Peak position
UK Albums (Official Charts)	31
US Billboard 200	93
