= Carrying a Torch =

Song by Van Morrison

from the album Hymns to the Silence
- Released: 1991
- Recorded: 1991
- Genre: Folk-rock
- Length: 4:26
- Label: Polydor Records
- Songwriter(s): Van Morrison
- Producer(s): Van Morrison

"Carrying a Torch"

Single by Tom Jones and Van Morrison

from the album Carrying A Torch
- A-side: "Carrying a Torch"
- B-side: "Walk Tall (Valley of the Shadows)"
- Released: March 1991
- Genre: Celtic, Folk-rock
- Length: 3:50
- Label: Dover
- Songwriter(s): Van Morrison
- Producer(s): Van Morrison

Tom Jones singles chronology
"Couldn't Say Goodbye" (1991)	"Carrying a Torch" (1991)	"I'm Not Feeling It Anymore" (1991)

"Carrying a Torch" is a popular song written by Northern Irish singer-songwriter Van Morrison and released on his 1991 double album, Hymns to the Silence. It was also included on his 2015 album "Duets: Re-working the Catalogue" with Clare Teal.

Rolling Stone magazine reviewer Elysa Gardner praised the song, saying that it "has the makings of a classic, with a stately chorus and shining verses that tie the flesh to the spirit: 'You're the keeper of the flame/And you burn so bright/Baby why don't we re-connect/Move into the light'."

== Cover versions ==
Tom Jones also recorded the song, together with Van Morrison, on his album Carrying a Torch (released the same year, in March). Their version of the song was released as a single and charted at No. 57 in 1991 in the UK. This collaboration came about when Morrison showed his newly written song "Carrying a Torch" to Jones, who was "so impressed that he invited Morrison to play on his new record" (Johnny Rogan). Morrison wrote, played on and produced four tracks that appeared on Jones' album.

Bob Dylan has also performed the song occasionally at his concerts.

== Personnel on original release ==
- Van Morrison – vocals
- Paul Robinson – drums
- Nicky Scott – bass
- Neil Drinkwater – piano, synthesizer
- Carol Kenyon and Katie Kissoon – backing vocals
- Fiachra Trench – string arrangements
- Gavyn Wright – string section leader
