= She's a Lady (album) =

Tom Jones Sings She's a Lady

Studio album by Tom Jones
- Released: 1971
- Label: Decca
- Producer: Gordon Mills

Tom Jones chronology
| I Who Have Nothing (1970) | Tom Jones Sings She's a Lady (1971) | Tom Jones Live at Caesar's Palace (1971) |

Singles from She's a Lady
- 1. "She's a Lady" Released: 16 January 1971; 2. "Puppet Man / Resurrection Shuffle" Released: 5 June 1971

Professional ratings
Review scores
| Source | Rating |
|---|---|
| AllMusic | 2/5 stars |

Tom Jones Sings She's a Lady is a studio album by Welsh singer Tom Jones, released in May 1971 on Decca Records (on Parrot Records in the United States and Canada).

The album spent seven weeks on the UK official albums chart, peaking for two weeks at number 9.

== Track listing ==
Side 1
| No. | Title | Writer(s) | Length |
|---|---|---|---|
| 1. | "She's a Lady" | Anka | 2:55 |
| 2. | "Do What You Gotta Do" | Webb | 2:51 |
| 3. | "In Dreams" | Orbison | 3:24 |
| 4. | "Nothing Rhymed" | O'Sullivan | 3:06 |
| 5. | "Til I Can't Take It Any More" | Otis, Burton | 2:17 |
| 6. | "Resurrection Shuffle" | Ashton | 2:56 |

Side 2
| No. | Title | Writer(s) | Length |
|---|---|---|---|
| 1. | "Puppet Man" | Sedaka, Greenfield | 3:27 |
| 2. | "It's Up to the Woman" | Renzetti, Goldberg | 3:57 |
| 3. | "Ebb Tide (The Sea)" | Sigman, Maxwell | 3:43 |
| 4. | "One Night Only Love Maker" | Monda | 3:21 |
| 5. | "You're My World (Il mio mondo)" | Sigman, Paoli, Bindi | 3:24 |

== Charts ==
| Chart (1971) | Peak position |
|---|---|
| UK Albums (OCC) | 9 |
| US Billboard 200 | 17 |

== Certifications ==
| Region | Certification | Certified units/sales |
|---|---|---|
| United States (RIAA) | Gold | 500,000^{^} |
^{^} Shipments figures based on certification alone.
