= Delilah (Tom Jones album) =

Studio album by Tom Jones
- Released: 12 July 1968
- Genres: Pop, blue-eyed soul
- Length: 37:01
- Label: Decca
- Producer: Peter Sullivan

Tom Jones (Decca) chronology
13 Smash Hits (1967)	Delilah (1968)	Help Yourself (1968)

Singles from Delilah
- 1. "Delilah" Released: 5 March 1968

Professional ratings
Review scores
Source	Rating
AllMusic	2/5 stars

Delilah is the sixth studio album by Welsh singer Tom Jones. Released in 1968, it became his first album to reach number one on the UK Albums Chart, spending two separate one week reigns at the top during a run of 14 consecutive weeks in the top 5.

== Background ==
The album was produced by Peter Sullivan and featured 12 tracks spanning pop and blue-eyed soul.

The album included the title track "Delilah", as well as "Weeping Annaleah", "One Day Soon", "Laura", "My Elusive Dreams" and "Take Me". Several tracks were reinterpretations of songs previously released by other artists. The title track was written by Barry Mason (lyrics) and Les Reed (music).

Delilah achieved commercial success. It entered the UK Albums Chart on 27 July 1968 and reached number one on two occasions, spending a total of 29 weeks on the chart. It was Tom Jones's first album to reach number one on the UK Albums Chart.

== Track listing ==
Side one

1. "Delilah" (Barry Mason, Les Reed) – 3:26
2. "Weeping Annaleah" (Mickey Newbury, Dan Folger) – 3:26
3. "One Day Soon" (Francis Lai, Don Black) – 2:39
4. "Laura" (Leon Ashley, Margie Singleton) – 3:25
5. "Make This Heart of Mine Smile Again" (Sol Parker, Kelly Owens) – 2:39
6. "Lingering On" (Scott English, Stanley J. Gelber, James Last) – 3:15

Side two

7. "You Can't Stop Love" (Gordon Mills, Les Reed) – 3:05
8. "My Elusive Dreams" (Curly Putman, Billy Sherrill) – 3:18
9. "Just Out of Reach (Of My Two Open Arms)" (Virgil F. Stewart) – 2:44
10. "Only a Fool Breaks His Own Heart" (Shelly Coburn, Norman Bergen) – 2:35
11. "Why Can't I Cry" (Johnny Harris, Kim Clarke) – 3:10
12. "Take Me" (George Jones, Leon Payne) – 3:12

== Charts ==
Chart (1968)	Peak position
German Albums (Offizielle Top 100)	2
Italian Albums (HitParadeItalia)	1
Norwegian Albums (VG-lista)	1
UK Albums (Official Charts)	1

== Personnel ==
- Peter Sullivan - producer
- Bill Price - engineer
