= I Who Have Nothing (album) =

Studio album by Tom Jones
- Released: 1970
- Label: Decca
- Producer: Peter Sullivan

Tom Jones chronology
Tom (1970)	I Who Have Nothing (1970)	She's a Lady (1971)

Singles from I Who Have Nothing
- 1. "Daughter of Darkness" Released: 18 April 1970; 2. "I (Who Have Nothing)" Released: 15 August 1970

Professional ratings
Review scores
Source	Rating
AllMusic	3/5 stars

I Who Have Nothing is a studio album by Welsh singer Tom Jones, released in 1970 on Decca Records (on Parrot Records in the United States and Canada).

The album spent 10 weeks on the UK official albums chart, peaking at number 10.

== Track listing ==
Side 1
No.	Title	Writer(s)	Length
1.	"Daughter of Darkness"	Stephens, Reed
2.	"I Have Dreamed"	Rodgers, Hammerstein
3.	"Love's Been Good to Me"	McKuen
4.	"Lodi"	John Fogerty
5.	"Try a Little Tenderness"	Woods, Campbell, Connelly

Side 2
No.	Title	Writer(s)	Length
1.	"I (Who Have Nothing)"	Donida, Leiber, Stoller, Mogol
2.	"What the World Needs Now Is Love"	Bacharach, David
3.	"With One Exception"	Sherill, Sutton
4.	"To Love Somebody"	B. R. & M. Gibb
5.	"Brother, Can You Spare a Dime"	Harburg, Gorney
6.	"See Saw"	Covay, Cropper

== Charts ==
Chart (1970)	Peak position
UK Albums (OCC)	10
US Billboard 200	23

== Certifications ==
Region	Certification	Certified units/sales
United States (RIAA)	Gold	500,000^{^}
^{^} Shipments figures based on certification alone.
