= What's New Pussycat? (Tom Jones album) =

Studio album by Tom Jones
- Released: September 1965
- Recorded: 1965
- Genres: Pop, blue-eyed soul
- Length: 30:29 (LP)
- Label: Parrot
- Producer: Peter Sullivan

Tom Jones chronology
Along Came Jones (1965)	What's New Pussycat? (1965)	A-tom-ic Jones (1966)

Singles from What New Pussycat
- 1. "With These Hands" Released: 14 July 1965; 2. "What New Pussycat" Released: 18 August 1965

Professional ratings
Review scores
Source	Rating
Allmusic	3/5 stars

What's New Pussycat? is the second studio album released by Tom Jones, created to capitalize on the success of his then-current hit single, the theme song from What's New Pussycat?

The album also included songs that had been removed from the US version of Jones' debut album ("I've Got a Heart", "The Rose", "Some Other Guy", "Endlessly"). Jones had covered Little Richard's hit "Bama Lama Bama Loo" on the live EP Tom Jones on Stage earlier in the year, and the studio version appears here. His previous UK single ("With These Hands" b/w "Untrue") and other B-sides from the singles "Once Upon a Time" ("I Tell the Sea") and "It's Not Unusual" ("To Wait for Love") fill out the track list.

This album was unusual in that it originated from Jones' US label Parrot, and not from Decca.

What's New Pussycat? was released by London Records on Compact Disc with bonus tracks in 1987. These additional tracks include the A-side "Once Upon a Time", as well as Jones' contribution to the various artists benefit album 14 – Lord's Taverners ("Kiss, Kiss") and 2 outtakes from other sessions.

== Track listing ==
Side one
No.	Title	Writer(s)	Length
1.	"What's New Pussycat?"	Burt Bacharach, Hal David	2:18
2.	"Some Other Guy"	Gordon Mills	2:31
3.	"I've Got a Heart"	Mills	2:39
4.	"Little by Little"	Mills	2:20
5.	"Won't You Give Him (One More Chance)"	Joseph Martin, Winfield Scott	2:27
6.	"Bama Lama Bama Loo"	Richard Penniman	1:50
Total length:			14:05

Side two
No.	Title	Writer(s)	Length
1.	"With These Hands"	Benny Davis, Abner Silver	2:41
2.	"Untrue Unfaithful"	Mills	2:34
3.	"To Wait For Love (Is to Waste Your Life Away)"	Bacharach, David	1:49
4.	"And I Tell the Sea"	Tom Jones, Mills	3:12
5.	"The Rose"	Mills	2:43
6.	"Endlessly"	Brook Benton, Clyde Otis	3:25
Total length:			16:24

What's New Pussycat? – Compact Disc bonus tracks
No.	Title	Writer(s)	Length
13.	"Memphis, Tennessee"	Chuck Berry	2:40
14.	"Kiss, Kiss"	Bob Barron, Jack Price	2:10
15.	"Once Upon a Time"	Mills	2:07
16.	"What'cha Gonna Do"	Mills	3:07
Total length:			10:04

== Personnel ==
- Peter Sullivan - producer
- Bill Price - engineer
- Les Reed - musical director
- The Squires (Bill Parkinson, Chris Slade, Mickey Gee, Vernon Hopkins) - accompaniment on "Little By Little" and "Bama Lama Bama Loo"
