= 24 Hours (Tom Jones album) =

Studio album by Tom Jones
- Released: 28 November 2008
- Length: 54:49 (International version); 54:25 (US version)
- Label: S-Curve; EMI
- Producer: Future Cut; Steve Greenberg; Nellee Hooper; Michael Mangini; The Pumali Panthers; S*A*M & Sluggo; Betty Wright

Tom Jones chronology
Tom Jones & Jools Holland (2004)	24 Hours (2008)	Praise & Blame (2010)

24 Hours is the 37th studio album by Welsh musician Tom Jones. It was released on 28 November 2008 by S-Curve Records internationally and by EMI Records in the United States.

== Critical reception ==
Professional ratings
Review scores
Source	Rating
AllMusic	4/5 stars
The Guardian	2/5 stars
The Observer	2/5 stars

In a review of the album for AllMusic, editor John Bush noted that Jones has "always chosen collaborators who can pinpoint how his classic sound would work in a contemporary context. Here, it's a pounding and drum-heavy production that still allows room for organic touches (blazing horns, stinging brass, twanging guitars). The quality of the songs is high, and most are kept in-house, so they match his persona well." Jude Rogers from The Guardian found that the ballads on 24 Hours "offer richer pickings", and described the title track as "an effective piece of Johnny Cash-lite about a man on death row. The final breaths of this character may close the album, but Jones's belly-deep bellow abides." Rogers' colleague, Observer critic Johnny Davis, wrote: "Jones bares his inner songwriter to Lily Allen producers Future Cut. Reflections on love, life and 'the wife' abound as horns parp Ronson-ly. But only Sixties cover "I'm Alive" soars."

== Commercial performance ==
In the United Kingdom, 24 Hours reached Gold status on 9 January 2009.

== Track listing ==
24 Hours international version
No.	Title	Writer(s)	Producer(s)	Length
1.	"I'm Alive"	Peter Lucia; Tommy James	S*A*M & Sluggo	3:38
2.	"If He Should Ever Leave You"	Tom Jones; Darren Lewis; Iyiola Babalola; Nicole Morier	Future Cut	3:31
3.	"We Got Love"	Jones; Lewis; Babalola; Lisa Greene	Future Cut	2:58
4.	"Feels Like Music"	Jones; Lewis; Babalola; Greene	Future Cut	3:37
5.	"Give a Little Love"	Jones; Lewis; Babalola; Kara DioGuardi	Future Cut	3:00
6.	"The Road"	Jones; Lewis; Babalola; Greene	Future Cut	4:02
7.	"In Style and Rhythm"	Georg Hartwig; Thomas Wander	The Pumali Panthers	3:22
8.	"Sugar Daddy"	Bono; Simon Carmody; The Edge	Future Cut; Nellee Hooper	3:38
9.	"Seasons"	Jones; Lewis; Babalola; Greene	Future Cut	4:12
10.	"Never"	Babalola; Lewis; DioGuardi	Future Cut	3:55
11.	"The Hitter"	Bruce Springsteen	Betty Wright; Michael Mangini; Steve Greenberg	6:30
12.	"Seen That Face"	Jones; Lewis; Babalola; Morier	Future Cut	4:20
13.	"24 Hours"	Jones; Lewis; Babalola; Greene	Future Cut	8:06
Total length:				54:49

Note

- On track 13, following a period of silence after "24 Hours" (3:55), a hidden track plays, titled "Take Me Back to the Party".

24 Hours US version
No.	Title	Writer(s)	Producer(s)	Length
1.	"I'm Alive"	Lucia; James	S*A*M & Sluggo	3:38
2.	"If He Should Ever Leave You"	Jones; Lewis; Babalola; Morier	Future Cut	3:31
3.	"We Got Love"	Jones; Lewis; Babalola; Greene	Future Cut	2:58
4.	"Give a Little Love"	Jones; Lewis; Babalola; DioGuardi	Future Cut	2:59
5.	"The Road"	Jones; Lewis; Babalola; Greene	Future Cut	4:02
6.	"In Style and Rhythm"	Hartwig; Wander	The Pumali Panthers	3:21
7.	"Sugar Daddy"	Bono; Carmody; The Edge	Future Cut; Hooper	3:37
8.	"Seasons"	Jones; Lewis; Babalola; Greene	Future Cut	4:12
9.	"Never"	Babalola; Lewis; DioGuardi	Future Cut	3:55
10.	"The Hitter"	Springsteen	Wright; Mangini; Greenberg	6:30
11.	"Seen That Face"	Jones; Lewis; Babalola; Morier	Future Cut	2:27
12.	"24 Hours"	Jones; Lewis; Babalola; Greene	Future Cut	3:55
13.	"More Than Memories"	Carla Thomas; Gregg Sutton	Wright; Mangini; Greenberg	4:01

Bonus track
No.	Title	Writer(s)	Producer(s)	Length
14.	"Just Like a Woman"	Lewis; Babalola; Greene	Future Cut	2:48
Total length:				54:25

== Charts ==
Chart performance for 24 Hours
Chart (2008)	Peak position
Austrian Albums (Ö3 Austria)	61
Belgian Albums (Ultratop Flanders)	80
Belgian Albums (Ultratop Wallonia)	73
Dutch Albums (Album Top 100)	55
French Albums (SNEP)	59
German Albums (Offizielle Top 100)	70
Irish Albums (IRMA)	88
Italian Albums (FIMI)	39
Portuguese Albums (AFP)	21
Scottish Albums (OCC)	50
Spanish Albums (Promusicae)	89
Swedish Albums (Sverigetopplistan)	50
Swiss Albums (Schweizer Hitparade)	94
UK Albums (OCC)	32
US Billboard 200	105

== Certifications ==
Certifications for 24 Hours
Region	Certification	Certified units/sales
United Kingdom (BPI)	Gold	100,000^{^}
^{^} Shipments figures based on certification alone.

== Release history ==
24 Hours release history
Region	Date	Format(s)	Label(s)	Ref.
Various	28 November 2008	Digital download; CD	S-Curve	
