= Tom Jones Live at Caesar's Palace =

Live album by Tom Jones
- Released: 1971
- Label: Decca

Tom Jones chronology
She's a Lady (1970)	Tom Jones Live at Caesar's Palace (1971)	Tom Jones Close Up (1972)

Professional ratings
Review scores
Source	Rating
AllMusic	4/5 stars

Tom Jones Live at Caesar's Palace is a live album by Welsh singer Tom Jones, released in 1971 on Decca Records (on Parrot Records in the United States and Canada).

The album spent five weeks on the UK official albums chart, peaking for two non-consecutive weeks at number 27.

== Track listing ==
Side 1

1. "Dance of Love"
2. "Cabaret"
3. "Soul Man"
4. "I (Who Have Nothing)"
5. "Delilah"

Side 2

1. "Bridge over Troubled Water"
2. "My Way"
3. "God Bless the Children"

Side 3

1. Introduction of members of the orchestra
  "Resurrection Shuffle"
2. "She's a Lady"
3. "Till"

Side 4

1. Hit medley
  "I'll Never Fall in Love Again"
  "Daughter of Darkness"
  "Love Me Tonight"
  "It's Not Unusual"
2. Hi Heel Sneakers
3. Rock 'n' roll medley
  "Good Old Rock 'n' Roll"
  "Johnny B. Goode"
  "Bony Moronie"
  "Long Tall Sally"

== Charts ==
Chart (1971)	Peak position
UK Albums (OCC)	27
US Billboard 200	43
