= Reload (Tom Jones album) =

Studio album by Tom Jones
- Released: 16 September 1999
- Recorded: 1998–1999
- Genre: Pop
- Length: 62:36
- Label: Gut/V2
- Producers: Tore Johansson; Bird & Bush; Stephen Hague; Guy Chambers; Steve Power; Jon Jacobs; Neil Hannon; Dave Eringa; James Dean Bradfield; Mousse T.; Johnny Douglas; D'Influence; Van Morrison; Gota Yashiki; Jeremy Wheatley; Magnus Fiennes; TommyD; Geoff Barrow; Adrian Utley

Tom Jones chronology
The Lead and How to Swing It (1994)	Reload (1999)	Mr. Jones (2002)

Singles from Reload
- 1. "Burning Down the House" Released: 13 September 1999; 2. "Baby, It's Cold Outside" Released: 6 December 1999; 3. "Mama Told Me Not to Come" Released: 6 March 2000; 4. "Sex Bomb" Released: 8 May 2000 (Note: First released in certain European countries in 1999 and early 2000.); 5. "You Need Love Like I Do" Released: 6 November 2000

Reload is the 34th studio album by Tom Jones, released in 1999. It contains 15 duets with a range of artists including Van Morrison, Cerys Matthews, Stereophonics, Robbie Williams, and Portishead, mostly recorded with each of the featured artists' usual record producers and in their usual studios. The tracks are mainly cover versions, with a new version of one of Jones' own songs, "Looking Out My Window" (1968), and one original track, "Sex Bomb".

Reload became the highest seller of Jones's career, reaching number one on the UK Albums Chart in 1999 and again in 2000. Its biggest single was the collaboration with Mousse T., "Sex Bomb", which reached number 3 on the UK Singles Chart and was later used in a 2003 episode of The Simpsons (a show Jones had guest starred on in 1992). The album has sold more than four million copies worldwide. It was not released in the US; instead the compilation Reloaded: Greatest Hits was issued there in 2003 and featured highlights from Reload.

== Release ==
The album was released on 16 September 1999 in the UK by Gut Records and was released a little later in the US by V2 Records. Five singles were released from the album: "Burning Down the House" (September 1999), "Baby, It's Cold Outside" (December 1999), "Mama Told Me Not to Come" (March 2000), and remixes of "Sex Bomb" (May 2000) and "You Need Love Like I Do" (November 2000).

== Critical reception ==
Professional ratings
Review scores
Source	Rating
AllMusic	4.5/5 stars

In a review for AllMusic, Carlo Wolff described the album as "Ultra-modern and topical", and that "Reload suggests you can easily ignore Jones' "What's New Pussycat?" past." He went on to opine that "Not only does Jones deliver one of the more invigorating workings of modern pop here, his selection of material and choice of mates prove that in addition to his routinely extraordinary performances, he's still recording quite potently, thank you." Wolff described the featured artists as "a motley, and very talented, crew", and that "Jones more than holds his own, turning the [covered] tunes into unusually personal and expressive vehicles.

== Commercial performance ==
Reload became the highest seller of Jones' career, reaching number one on the UK Albums Chart in 1999 and again in 2000. As of April 2021, it has sold nearly 1.5 million copies in the UK, and more than four million copies worldwide.

== Track listing ==
Reload track listing
No.	Title	Writer(s)	Original artist	Length
1.	"Burning Down the House" (with The Cardigans)	David Byrne; Tina Weymouth; Chris Frantz; Jerry Harrison	Talking Heads	3:39
2.	"Mama Told Me Not to Come" (with Stereophonics)	Randy Newman	Eric Burdon	3:00
3.	"Are You Gonna Go My Way" (with Robbie Williams)	Lenny Kravitz; Craig Ross	Lenny Kravitz	3:27
4.	"All Mine" (with The Divine Comedy)	Geoff Barrow; Beth Gibbons; Adrian Utley	Portishead	3:59
5.	"Sunny Afternoon" (with Space)	Ray Davies	The Kinks	3:26
6.	"I'm Left, You're Right, She's Gone" (with James Dean Bradfield)	Stan Kesler; William E. Taylor	Elvis Presley	3:40
7.	"Sex Bomb" (with Mousse T.)	Mousse T.; Errol Rennalls	New song	3:31
8.	"You Need Love Like I Do" (with Heather Small)	Norman Whitfield; Barrett Strong	Gladys Knight & the Pips	3:49
9.	"Looking Out My Window" (with James Taylor Quartet)	Tom Jones	Tom Jones (re-recording)	3:19
10.	"Sometimes We Cry" (with Van Morrison)	Van Morrison	Van Morrison (re-recording)	5:00
11.	"Lust for Life" (with The Pretenders)	Iggy Pop; David Bowie	Iggy Pop	3:42
12.	"Little Green Bag" (with Barenaked Ladies)	Jan Visser; Hans Bouwens	George Baker Selection	3:49
13.	"Ain't That a Lot of Love" (with Simply Red)	Willa Dean Parker; Homer Banks	Homer Banks	2:42
14.	"She Drives Me Crazy" (with Zucchero)	Roland Gift; David Steele	Fine Young Cannibals	3:35
15.	"Never Tear Us Apart" (with Natalie Imbruglia)	Andrew Farriss; Michael Hutchence	INXS	3:08
16.	"Baby, It's Cold Outside" (with Cerys Matthews)	Frank Loesser	First recorded in the film Neptune's Daughter	3:41
17.	"Motherless Child" (with Portishead)	Unknown	Traditional	5:09
Total length:				62:36

Note

- A "special edition" release of the album also includes the single remixes of "Sex Bomb" (Peppermint Disco Radio Mix) and "You Need Love Like I Do" (7th District Radio Mix or Double Click Remix, depending on version) as bonus tracks.

== Personnel ==
Adapted from the album's liner notes.

- Tom Jones – vocals (all tracks)

"Burning Down the House"

- The Cardigans – featured artist
- Nina Persson – vocals
- Peter Svensson – guitar
- Magnus Sveningsson – bass guitar
- Bengt Lagerberg – drums
- Lasse Johansson – guitar, keyboards
- Tore Johansson – additional keyboards, backing vocals
- Pece Masalkovski – additional guitars
- Jens Lindgård, Petter Lindgård, Sven Andersson – horns
- Hello Bobadee – horn arrangement
- Lynette Koyana, Per Sunding, Patrik Bartosch, Maurits Carlsson – backing vocals
- Produced by Tore Johansson
- Recorded at Tambourine

"Mama Told Me Not to Come"

- Stereophonics – featured artist
- Kelly Jones – vocals, guitar
- Stuart Cable – drums
- Richard Jones – bass guitar
- Tony Kirkham – keyboards
- Victy Silva – backing vocals
- Produced by Bird & Bush; additional production by Stephen Hague
- Engineered by Bob Kraushaar
- Programming & percussion by Andy Duncan
- Mixed by Jeremy Wheatley
- Recorded at Hook End, Eden & RAK; mixed at the Town House

"Are You Gonna Go My Way"

- Robbie Williams – featured artist; vocals
- Fil Eisler – guitar, bass
- Chris Sharrock – drums
- Claudia Fontaine, Sam Brown – backing vocals
- Paul Spong – trumpet
- Chris White – tenor saxophone
- Dave Bishop – baritone saxophone
- Stuart Brooks, Steve Sidwell – trumpet
- Neil Sidwell – trombone
- Paul Turner – bass
- Produced by Guy Chambers & Steve Power
- Mixed by Hefner Moraes
- Arranged by Guy Chambers
- Brass arranged by Steve Sidwell & Guy Chambers
- Recorded at Metropolis, Mayfair & Battery; mixed at Aquarium

"All Mine"

- The Divine Comedy – featured artist
- Neil Hannon – vocals
- Ivor Talbot – guitar
- Bryan Mills – bass guitar
- Joby Talbot – piano
- Stuart 'Pinkie' Bates – Hammond organ
- Miggy Barradas – drums
- Rob Farrer – percussion
- Phil Eastop, Jim Rattigan, Nick Busch, Richard Clews – horns
- Maurice Murphy, Andy Crowley, Steve Waterman, Stuart Brooks – trumpets
- Neil Sidwell, Mike Hext – trombones
- Pat Jackman, Roger Argente – bass trombones
- Jamie Talbot – baritone saxophone
- Gavyn Wright, Perry Montague-Mason, Rebecca Hirsch, Pat Kiernan, Boguslav Kostecki, Jim McLeod, Dermot Crehan, Dave Woodcock, Chris Tombling, Jackie Shave, Vaughan Armon, Mark Berrow, Ben Cruft, Everton Nelson – violins
- Peter Lale, Katie Wilkinson, Garfield Jackson, Bruce White – violas
- Martin Loveday, Paul Kegg, Dave Daniels – cellos
- Chris Laurence – double bass
- Produced by Jon Jacobs & Neil Hannon
- Engineered by Jon Jacobs; additional engineering by Andy Scade
- Arranged by Joby Talbot
- Recorded at Olympic; mixed by Jon Jacobs at Westside

"Sunny Afternoon"

- Space – featured artist
- Tommy Scott – vocals
- Franny Griffiths – keyboards
- Jamie Murphy – guitar
- Dave Palmer – bass
- Leon Caffrey – drums
- Jens Lindgård, Petter Lindgård, Sven Andersson – horns
- Produced by Tore Johansson
- Recorded at Country Hell & Tambourine

"I'm Left, You're Right, She's Gone"

- James Dean Bradfield – featured artist; vocals, guitars, bass
- Nick Nasmyth – keyboards
- Greg Haver – drums
- Produced & mixed by Dave Eringa & James Dean Bradfield; assisted by Boris Aldridge
- Recorded at RAK; mixed at Olympic

"Sex Bomb"

- Mousse T. – featured artist; producer
- Peter Hinderthür – horn, bass
- Uwe Granitza – horn
- Lutz Krajenski – Hammond organ
- Recorded at Peppermint Park & Bunk, Junk and Genius

"You Need Love Like I Do"

- Heather Small – featured artist; vocals
- Johnny Douglas – drums, guitars, keyboards
- Dave Clew – programming, keyboards
- Paul Turner – bass
- Mike Stevens – saxophone
- Nicol Thomson – trombone
- Duncan Mackay – trumpet
- Alan Ross – guitar
- Beverly Skeete, Sylvia Mason-James, Andy Caine, Miriam Stockley – backing vocals
- Produced by Johnny Douglas
- Mixed by Ren Swan
- Engineered by Marc Lane
- Recorded & mixed at Sarm West

"Looking Out My Window"

- James Taylor Quartet – featured artist
- James Taylor – Hammond organ
- Ed Baden-Powell – programming, bass, keyboards, guitars, drum programming
- John Thirkell – trumpet, flugelhorn
- Steve Marston – saxophones
- Kwame Kwaten – additional keyboards
- Harriet Williams – opera voice
- Pascal Consoli – drums
- Produced by D'Influence
- Pre-production at the D-lab
- Recorded at Sarm West & Master Rock
- Mixed at Master Rock; mix engineer: Paul Emanuel

"Sometimes We Cry"

- Van Morrison – featured artist; vocals
- Steve Pearce – bass
- Ralph Salmins – percussion
- Mick Cox – acoustic guitar
- Geoff Dunn – drums
- Geraint Watkins – keyboards
- Pee Wee Ellis – horns
- Johnny Scott – guitar
- Malcolm Mortimore – drums
- Andy Duncan – programming, percussion
- Carmen Smart – vocals
- Mark Ralph – guitar
- Tim Sanders – tenor saxophone
- Simon Clarke – horn arrangement, baritone & alto saxophone
- Jenny La Touche, Travis J. Cole, Leonard Meade, Cornelius Macarthy, Irene Myrtle Forrester, Carmen Smart – backing vocals
- Produced by Van Morrison
- Additional production & mixing by Stephen Hague; mix engineer: Bob Kraushaar
- Recorded by Walter Samuel
- Recorded at The Wool Hall & RAK

"Lust for Life"

- The Pretenders – featured artist
- Chrissie Hynde – vocals
- Adam Seymour – guitars, backing vocals
- Guy Pratt – piano, bass
- Ged Lynch – drums, percussion
- Johnny Marr – guitar, harmonica, backing vocals
- Andy Duncan – percussion
- Produced by Stephen Hague
- Richard Norris – recording engineer
- Chuck Norman – programming
- Mixed by Jeremy Wheatley at the Town House
- Recorded at Sarm West & RAK

"Little Green Bag"

- Barenaked Ladies – featured artist
- Steven Page – vocals
- Jim Creeggan – double bass
- Tyler Stewart – drums
- Ed Robertson, Kevin Hearn – electric guitar
- Chris Brown – organ, clavinet
- Andy Duncan – programming, percussion
- Mark Ralph – guitar
- Produced by Stephen Hague
- Mixed by Stephen Hague & Bob Kraushaar at RAK
- Richard Norris – recording engineer
- Recorded at Dep & Sarm West

"Ain't That a Lot of Love"

- Simply Red – featured artist
- Mick Hucknall – vocals
- Gota Yashiki & James Wiltshire – programming, keyboards
- Gota Yashiki & Greg Bone – guitar
- Neil Cowley – keyboards
- Laurence Cottle – bass guitar
- Ian Kirkham & Chris de Margary – saxophones
- Kevin Robinson – trumpet
- John Johnson – trombone
- Produced by Gota Yashiki
- James Wiltshire, John Lee, Matthew White, Alan Douglas – recording engineers
- Emily Cracknell, Josh T. – assistant engineers
- Mixed by Jeremy Wheatley at the Town House
- Recorded at Westpoint

"She Drives Me Crazy"

- Zucchero – featured artist; vocals
- Chester Kamen – guitar
- Magnus Fiennes – keyboards, programming
- Willy South – Hammond organ
- Guy Pratt – bass guitar
- Ged Lynch – drums
- Simon Clarke – baritone & alto saxophones
- Roddy Lorimer – trumpet, baritone & alto saxophones
- Tim Sanders – tenor saxophone
- Annie Whitehead – trombone
- Produced by Jeremy Wheatley & Magnus Fiennes
- Recorded & mixed at the Town House

"Never Tear Us Apart"

- Natalie Imbruglia – featured artist; vocals
- Alan Ross – guitar
- Paul Turner – bass
- Johnny Douglas – drums, guitars, keyboards
- Dave Clews – programming, keyboards
- Vocals recorded by Stephen Hague
- String arrangement by Simon B. Hale
- Ann Morfee, Ian Humphries, Anna Hemery, Bev Davison, Chris Tombling, Iain King, Andrew Roberts, Rachel Byrt, R. George, Helen Hathorn, Richard Milone – violins
- Nick Barr, Steve Tees, Andrew Byrt – violas
- Sophie Harris, Nicholas Roberts, Nick Cooper, Adrian Bradbury – cellos
- Paul Sherman, Roger Linley – double bass
- Beverly Skeete, Sylvia Mason-James, Andy Caine, Miriam Stockley – backing vocals
- Produced by Johnny Douglas
- Engineered by Steve Price & Marc Lane; assisted by Tim Lambert
- Mixed by Ren Swan
- Recorded at Mayfair, Angel & Sarm West
- Mixed at the Town House

"Baby, It's Cold Outside"

- Cerys Matthews – featured artist; vocals
- John Parricelli – electric guitar
- Steve Pearce – bass
- Simon Chamberlain – piano
- Ian Thomas – drums
- Phil Todd, Jamie Talbot – alto saxophone
- Chris Davis, Chris White – tenor saxophone
- Dave Bishop – baritone saxophone
- Derek Watkins, Steve Sidwell, Simon Gardner, Stuart Brooks – trumpets, flugelhorn
- Pete Beachill, Neil Sidwell, Mark Nightingale – trombones
- Adrian Hallowell – bass trombone
- Rolf Wilson, Jonathan Evans-Jones, Rachel Allen, Bev Davison, Wilf Gibson, Helen Hathorn, Paul Willey, Pauline Lowbury, Paul Robertson, Sonia Slany, Pippa Ibbotson – violins
- Bill Hawkes, Andy Parker, Steve Tees, Roger Chase – violas
- Jonathan Williams, Nick Cooper, Mellisa Phelps – cellos
- Orchestra arranged by Matt Dunkley
- Produced & mixed by TommyD at the Town House
- Engineered by Andy Bradfield

"Motherless Child"

- Portishead – featured artist
- Beth Gibbons – backing vocals
- Adrian Utley – guitar, bass
- Clive Deamer – drums, timpani
- John Baggott – piano, vibes
- Gavyn Wright, Perry Montague-Mason, Pat Kiernan, Boguslav Kostecki, Vaughan Armon, Cathy Thompson, Warren Zielinski, Peter Lale, Rachel Bolt, Bruce White, Dave Daniels, Martin Loveday – string players
- Simon Gardner, Guy Barker, Tony Fischer, Neil Sidwell, Mark Nightingale, Sarah Williams – brass players
- Gavyn Wright – orchestra leader
- Strings & brass arranged by Nick Ingman
- Produced by Geoff Barrow & Adrian Utley
- Engineered by Steve Price & Niven Garland; assistant engineer: Marty McCorry
- Recorded at Starfish & Swanyard

Special editions bonus tracks:

"Sex Bomb"
(Peppermint Disco Radio Mix)

- Remix & additional production by Mousse T. & Royal Garden

"You Need Love Like I Do"
(7th District Radio Mix)

- Reproduced & rearranged by Lorenzo al Dino Pizzileo & Sergio Flores a.k.a 7th District Inc.
- Engineering, mixing & vocal production by Greg "Big G" Usek

"You Need Love Like I Do"
(Double Click Remix)

- Remixed by Double Click
- Additional production by Lee Stanley

Additional personnel

- Fresh Produce – sleeve design & image manipulation
- Robert Wheeler – cover photography
- Julian Bigg – inner sleeve photography
- Mark Luscombe-Whyte – studio band photography

== Charts ==
=== Weekly charts ===
Weekly chart performance for Reload
Chart (1999–2000)	Peak position
Australian Albums (ARIA)	3
Austrian Albums (Ö3 Austria)	3
Belgian Albums (Ultratop Flanders)	38
Belgian Albums (Ultratop Wallonia)	19
Danish Albums (Hitlisten)	16
Dutch Albums (Album Top 100)	10
Finnish Albums (Suomen virallinen lista)	31
French Albums (SNEP)	9
German Albums (Offizielle Top 100)	3
Hungarian Albums (MAHASZ)	7
Irish Albums (IRMA)	2
Italian Albums (FIMI)	12
New Zealand Albums (RMNZ)	4
Norwegian Albums (VG-lista)	6
Spanish Albums (PROMUSICAE)	22
Swedish Albums (Sverigetopplistan)	1
Swiss Albums (Schweizer Hitparade)	5
UK Albums (Official Charts)	1

=== Year-end charts ===
1999 year-end chart performance for Reload
Chart (1999)	Position
Australian Albums (ARIA)	49
German Albums (Offizielle Top 100)	76
UK Albums (OCC)	23

2000 year-end chart performance for Reload
Chart (2000)	Position
Austrian Albums (Ö3 Austria)	11
Dutch Albums (Album Top 100)	57
European Albums (Music & Media)	8
French Albums (SNEP)	66
German Albums (Offizielle Top 100)	10
Swiss Albums (Schweizer Hitparade)	29
UK Albums (OCC)	13

== Certifications and sales ==
Certifications and sales for Reload
Region	Certification	Certified units/sales
Australia (ARIA)	2× Platinum	140,000^{^}
Austria (IFPI Austria)	Platinum	50,000^{*}
Belgium (BRMA)	Gold	25,000^{*}
Canada (Music Canada)	Gold	50,000^{^}
Denmark	—	15,983
France (SNEP)	Platinum	300,000^{*}
Germany (BVMI)	Platinum	500,000^{^}
Italy (FIMI)	2× Platinum	200,000^{*}
Netherlands (NVPI)	Platinum	100,000^{^}
New Zealand (RMNZ)	Platinum	15,000^{^}
Spain (Promusicae)	2× Platinum	200,000^{^}
Sweden (GLF)	Platinum	80,000^{^}
Switzerland (IFPI Switzerland)	Platinum	50,000^{^}
United Kingdom (BPI)	4× Platinum	1,200,000^{‡}
Summaries
Europe (IFPI)	Platinum	1,000,000^{*}
^{*} Sales figures based on certification alone.^{^} Shipments figures based on certification alone.^{‡} Sales+streaming figures based on certification alone.
