= Tom Jones Close Up =

Studio album by Tom Jones
- Released: 1972
- Recorded: 1972
- Studio: Audio International Studios, London, England, United Kingdom
- Genre: Pop, blue-eyed soul
- Label: Decca
- Producer: Gordon Mills

Tom Jones chronology
Tom Jones Live at Caesar's Palace (1971)	Tom Jones Close Up (1972)	The Body and Soul of Tom Jones (1973)

Singles from Close Up
- 1. "The Young New Mexican Puppeteer" Released: 1 April 1972

Professional ratings
Review scores
Source	Rating
AllMusic	2/5 stars
Stereo Review	(mixed)
Nottingham Evening Post	(favourable)
The Age	(favourable)
The Oregon Journal	(favourable)
Omaha World-Herald	(favourable)
The Honolulu Advertiser	(favourable)
The Tennessean	(favourable)
Orlando Evening Star	(favourable)
Daily Mirror	(favourable)

Tom Jones Close Up is a studio album by Welsh singer Tom Jones, released in 1972 on Decca Records (on Parrot Records in the United States and Canada).

The album spent four weeks on the UK official albums chart, peaking for two weeks at number 17.

== Personnel ==
- Tom Jones – lead vocals
- Producer: Gordon Mills – album producer
- Engineer: Peter Rynston – recording engineer
- Music Director: Johnnie Spence – musical arrangements and direction
- Photography: David Steen – album photography (cover and sleeve)

== Track listing ==
Side 1
No.	Title	Writer(s)	Length
1.	"Witch Queen of New Orleans"	Lolly Vegas, Pat Vegas	2:37
2.	"Tired of Being Alone"	Al Green	3:04
3.	"Woman You Took My Life"	Kevin Johnson	4:02
4.	"If"	David Gates	3:02
5.	"The Young New Mexican Puppeteer"	Earl Shuman, Leon Carr	4:33

Side 2
No.	Title	Writer(s)	Length
1.	"All I Ever Need Is You"	Jimmy Holiday, Eddie Reeves	3:14
2.	"You've Got a Friend"	Carole King	2:48
3.	"Time to Get It Together"	Joey Levine, Arthur Resnick, Steve Feldman	2:29
4.	"I Won't Be Sorry to See Suzanne Again"	Eddie Seago, Geoff Stephens	3:38
5.	"Kiss an Angel Good Morning"	Ben Peters	3:08

== Charts ==
Chart (1972)	Peak position
UK Albums (OCC)	17
US Billboard 200	64
