= Mr. Jones (Tom Jones album) =

Studio album by Tom Jones
- Released: 10 December 2002
- Length: 44:45
- Label: V2
- Producer: Jerry Duplessis; Wyclef Jean

Tom Jones chronology
Reload (1999)	Mr. Jones (2002)	Tom Jones & Jools Holland (2004)

Singles from Mr. Jones
- 1. "Tom Jones International" Released: 2002; 2. "Heaven's Been a Long Time Comin'" Released: 2002; 3. "Black Betty" Released: 2003; 4. "I (Who Have Nothing)" Released: 2003

Mr. Jones is the 35th studio album by Welsh musician Tom Jones. It was released by V2 Records on 10 December 2002.

== Critical reception ==
Professional ratings
Review scores
Source	Rating
AllMusic	3.5/5 stars
The Guardian	1/5 stars

AllMusic editor William Ruhlmann rated the album three and a half out of five stars. He found that "Jones has never minded being the mouthpiece of a producer or two, confident enough in his own persona to stretch to meet different styles. Here, he collaborates with his partners, co-writing many of the songs. And the trio isn't afraid to take on the Jones' legend directly [...] Along with Jean and Duplessis, Jones seems to realize that the key to reinventing himself is to evoke his heyday and set it to contemporary beats." In a negative review of the album, Dorian Lynskey from The Guardian wrote: "It's not that Wyclef isn't a capable pop-rap producer, nor that Jones doesn't still have a gutsy soul voice. It's simply that the twain should never have met."

== Track listing ==
All tracks written by Jerry Duplessis, Wyclef Jean and Tom Jones, except where noted.

Mr. Jones track listing
No.	Title	Writer(s)	Length
1.	"Tom Jones International"		3:19
2.	"Younger Days"		5:23
3.	"Holiday"		3:29
4.	"Whatever It Takes"		3:59
5.	"Heaven's Been a Long Time Coming"		3:26
6.	"Black Betty"	Huddie Ledbetter	3:10
7.	"Jezebel"		3:58
8.	"The Letter"		3:48
9.	"This Is My Life"		3:30
10.	"We've Got Tonight"	Bob Seger	3:35
11.	"Feel the Rain"		3:23
12.	"I (Who Have Nothing)"	Giulio "Mogol" Rapetti; Carlo Donida; Jerry Leiber; Mike Stoller	3:43

== Charts ==
Chart performance for Mr. Jones
Chart (2002)	Peak position
Austrian Albums (Ö3 Austria)	58
French Albums (SNEP)	95
German Albums (Offizielle Top 100)	78
Portuguese Albums (AFP)	21
Swedish Albums (Sverigetopplistan)	31
Swiss Albums (Schweizer Hitparade)	62
UK Albums (OCC)	44
