= Sex Bomb =

Single by Tom Jones and Mousse T.

from the album Reload
- Released: November 1999
- Studio: Peppermint Park (Germany); Bunk, Junk, and Genius (London, England)
- Genre: Disco; funk; dance; pop
- Length: 3:34
- Label: Gut; V2
- Songwriters: Mousse T.; Errol Rennalls
- Producer: Mousse T.

Tom Jones UK singles chronology
"Mama Told Me Not to Come" (2000)	"Sex Bomb" (2000)	"You Need Love Like I Do" (2000)

Tom Jones international singles chronology
"Burning Down the House" (1999)	"Sex Bomb" (1999)	"Mama Told Me Not to Come" (2000)

Mousse T. singles chronology
"Ooh Song" (1999)	"Sex Bomb" (1999)	"Fire" (2002)

Music video
- "Sex Bomb" on YouTube

"Sex Bomb" is a song by Welsh singer Tom Jones. Performed in collaboration with German DJ and record producer Mousse T., the song was released in November 1999 in several European countries; in January of the following year, it was issued across the rest of Europe except the United Kingdom, where it was not released until May 2000. Outside the UK, the track served as the second single from Jones' 34th album, Reload, while in the UK, it served as the fourth single.

Commercially, "Sex Bomb" reached number one in France and Switzerland while becoming a top-three hit in Austria, Germany, Iceland, Italy, Spain, the United Kingdom, and Wallonia. The song's music video was directed by Barry Maguire. The Peppermint Disco Mix of the track contains a sample from "All American Girls" by Sister Sledge. A different version of the song appears on Mousse T.'s 2001 debut solo album, Gourmet de Funk.

== Track listings ==
- UK CD1 and cassette single
1. "Sex Bomb" (Peppermint Disco radio mix)
2. "Sex Bomb" (Sounds of Life half vocal mix)
3. "Sex Bomb" (Strike Boys mix)
4. "Sex Bomb" (album version)
- UK CD2
1. "Sex Bomb" (Peppermint Disco radio mix)
2. "Sex Bomb" (Agent Sumo's freestyle mix)
3. "Sex Bomb" (Peppermint Disco dub mix)
4. "Sex Bomb" (video)
- UK 12-inch single

A1. "Sex Bomb" (Peppermint Disco mix) – 6:25
A2. "Sex Bomb" (Peppermint Disco dub mix) – 6:46
B1. "Sex Bomb" (Sounds of Life half vocal mix) – 6:36

- European CD single
1. "Sex Bomb" (Peppermint Disco radio mix)
2. "Sex Bomb" (album version)
- European maxi-CD single
1. "Sex Bomb" (album version)
2. "Sex Bomb" (Peppermint Disco radio mix)
3. "Sex Bomb" (Peppermint Disco mix)
4. "Sex Bomb" (Strike Boys mix)
5. "Sex Bomb" (Sounds of Life half vocal mix)
- Australian CD single
1. "Sex Bomb" (album version)
2. "Sex Bomb" (Peppermint Disco radio mix)
3. "Sex Bomb" (Peppermint Disco mix)
4. "Sex Bomb" (Sounds of Life half vocal mix)
5. "Sex Bomb" (Sounds of Life bub mix)
6. "Sex Bomb" (Mousse T's big beat)
7. "Sex Bomb" (Strike Boys mix)

== Credits and personnel ==
Credits are adapted from the Reload booklet.

Studios

- Recorded at Peppermint Park Studios (Germany) and Bunk, Junk, and Genius Recording Studios (London, England)
- Mastered at The Soundmasters (London, England)

Personnel

- Mousse T. – writing, composition, production
- Errol Rennalls – writing, composition
- Tom Jones – vocals
- Lutz Krajenski – Hammond organ
- Peter Hinderthür – horns, bass
- Uwe Granitza – horns
- Kevin Metcalf – mastering

== Charts ==
=== Weekly charts ===
2000 weekly chart performance for "Sex Bomb"
Chart (2000)	Peak position
Australia (ARIA)	35
Austria (Ö3 Austria Top 40)	3
Belgium (Ultratop 50 Flanders)	11
Belgium (Ultratop 50 Wallonia)	2
Canada Adult Contemporary (RPM)	78
Canada Dance/Urban (RPM)	3
Czech Republic (IFPI)	5
Denmark (IFPI)	9
Europe (Eurochart Hot 100)	1
Finland (Suomen virallinen lista)	5
France (SNEP)	1
Germany (GfK)	3
Hungary (Mahasz)	4
Iceland (Íslenski Listinn Topp 40)	2
Ireland (IRMA)	7
Ireland Dance (IRMA)	7
Italy (FIMI)	2
Italy Airplay (Music & Media)	1
Netherlands (Dutch Top 40)	10
Netherlands (Single Top 100)	11
Norway (VG-lista)	18
Poland Airplay (Music & Media)	1
Romania (Romanian Top 100)	3
Scottish Singles Sales (Official Charts)	3
Spain (Promusicae)	2
Sweden (Sverigetopplistan)	9
Switzerland (Schweizer Hitparade)	1
UK Singles (Official Charts)	3
UK Indie (Official Charts)	2

2004 weekly chart performance for "Sex Bomb"
Chart (2004)	Peak position
US Dance Club Songs (Billboard) The Remixes	11

=== Year-end charts ===
Year-end chart performance for "Sex Bomb"
Chart (2000)	Position
Austria (Ö3 Austria Top 40)	33
Belgium (Ultratop 50 Flanders)	78
Belgium (Ultratop 50 Wallonia)	16
Brazil (Crowley)	82
Europe (Eurochart Hot 100)	3
France (SNEP)	10
Germany (Media Control)	28
Iceland (Íslenski Listinn Topp 40)	6
Ireland (IRMA)	75
Italy (Musica e dischi)	3
Netherlands (Dutch Top 40)	36
Netherlands (Single Top 100)	47
Romania (Romanian Top 100)	19
Spain (AFYVE)	5
Sweden (Hitlistan)	95
Switzerland (Schweizer Hitparade)	10
UK Singles (OCC)	58

== Certifications ==
Certifications for "Sex Bomb"
Region	Certification	Certified units/sales
Austria (IFPI Austria)	Gold	25,000^{*}
Belgium (BRMA)	Gold	25,000^{*}
Denmark (IFPI Danmark)	Gold	45,000^{‡}
France (SNEP)	Gold	250,000^{*}
Germany (BVMI)	Gold	250,000^{^}
Italy	—	50,000
Sweden (GLF)	Gold	15,000^{^}
Switzerland (IFPI Switzerland)	Gold	25,000^{^}
United Kingdom (BPI)	Silver	200,000^{^}
^{*} Sales figures based on certification alone.^{^} Shipments figures based on certification alone.^{‡} Sales+streaming figures based on certification alone.

== Release history ==
Release dates and formats for "Sex Bomb"
Region	Date	Format(s)	Label(s)	Ref.
Europe	November 1999	CD	Gut; V2	
Europe	10 January 2000	Maxi-CD	Gut; V2	
United Kingdom	8 May 2000	12-inch vinyl; CD; cassette	Gut; V2	
