= A-tom-ic Jones =

Studio album by Tom Jones
- Released: 14 January 1966
- Label: Decca (UK) Parrot (US)
- Producer: Peter Sullivan

Tom Jones (Decca) chronology
What's New Pussycat (1965)	A-tom-ic Jones (1966)	From the Heart (1966)

A-tom-ic Jones (US cover)

Professional ratings
Review scores
Source	Rating
AllMusic	2/5 stars
Record Mirror	4/5 stars

A-tom-ic Jones is the second Tom Jones album for Decca, and third overall, released in 1966. The title is a pun. Les Reed was credited as the musical director.

Due to concerns over alarming the record-buying public, it was released in the US with a different cover, removing the nuclear explosion in the background. The US version also discarded four tracks, in favor of his two hit theme songs "Thunderball" and "Promise Her Anything."

== Reception ==
Stephen Thomas Erlewine of AllMusic writes: "Given the quality of the record, its lack of success isn't surprising. Jones sings well, but he doesn't have the material to match his performance, making the album noticeably weaker than his first two collections."

== Track listing ==
Side one

1. "Dr. Love" (Ken Lauber, Sidney J. Wyche)
2. "Face of a Loser" (Les Reed, Robin Conrad)
3. "It's Been a Long Time Coming" (Jimmy Radcliffe, Joseph Brooks)
4. "In a Woman's Eyes" (Bobby Russell, Martha Sharp)
5. "More" (Nino Oliviero, Norman Newell, Riz Ortolani)
6. "I'll Never Let You Go" (Gordon Mills)
7. "The Loser" (Deborah Losak, Sharon Vanselow)

Side two

1. "To Make a Big Man Cry" (Les Reed, Peter Callander)
2. "Key to My Heart" (Gordon Mills)
3. "True Love Comes Only Once in a Lifetime" (Bob Halley, Neval Nader)
4. "A Little You" (Gordon Mills)
5. "You're So Good for Me" (Ezio Leoni, Robin Conrad)
6. "Where Do You Belong" (Gordon Mills)
7. "These Things You Don't Forget" (Van McCoy)

== Track listing (US) ==
Side one

1. "Thunderball" (Don Black, John Barry)
2. "True Love Comes Only Once in a Lifetime" (Bob Halley, Neval Nader)
3. "Key to My Heart" (Gordon Mills)
4. "These Things You Don't Forget" (Van McCoy)
5. "Dr. Love" (Ken Lauber, Sidney J. Wyche)
6. "I'll Never Let You Go" (Gordon Mills)

Side two

1. "Promise Her Anything" (Burt Bacharach, Hal David)
2. "A Little You" (Gordon Mills)
3. "In a Woman's Eyes" (Bobby Russell, Martha Sharp)
4. "More" (Nino Oliviero, Norman Newell, Riz Ortolani)
5. "Face of a Loser" (Les Reed, Robin Conrad)
6. "Where Do You Belong" (Gordon Mills)
