= List of UK top-ten singles in 1968 =

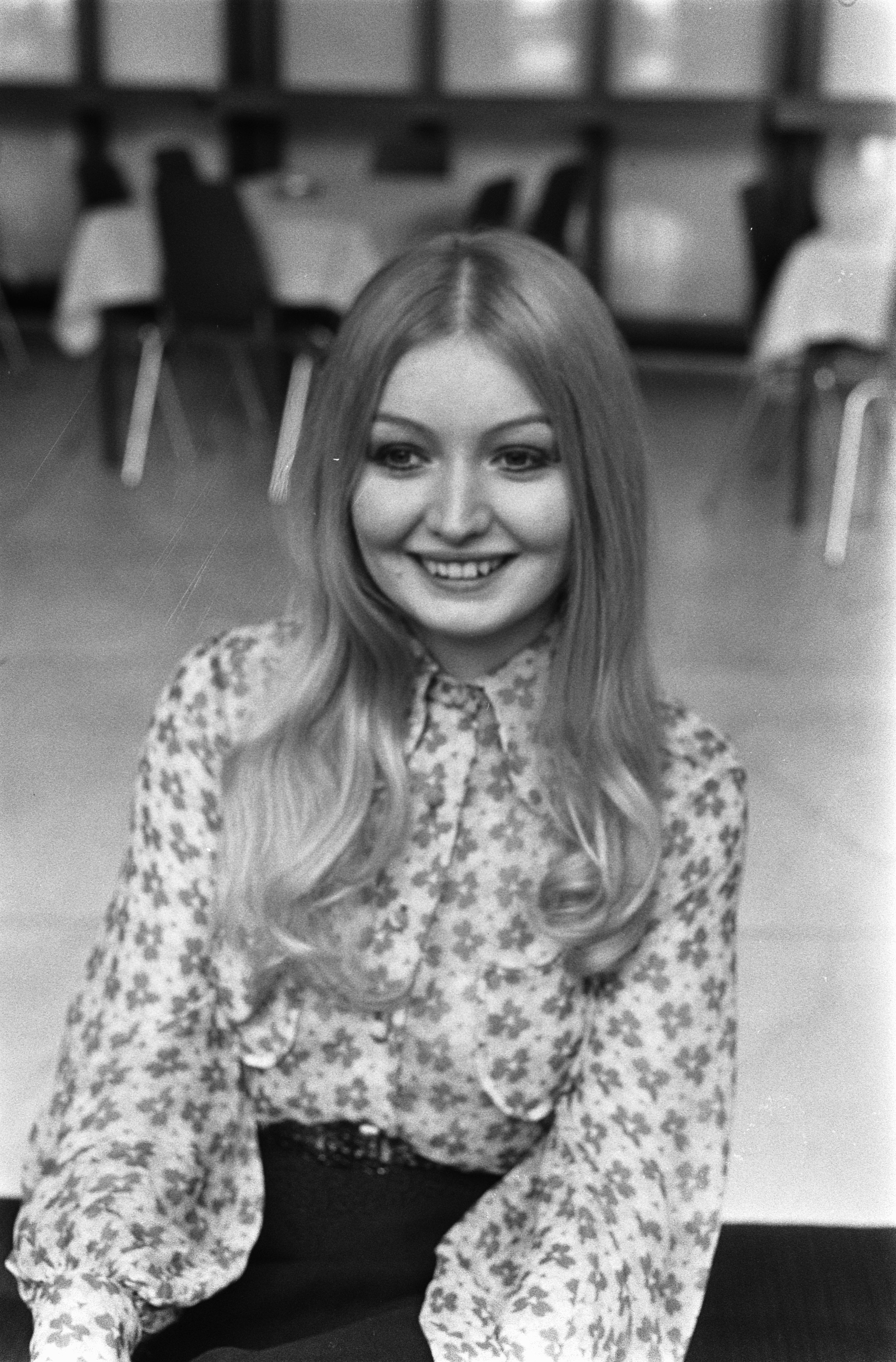
Mary Hopkin was only eighteen years old when her debut single "Those Were the Days" entered the UK top 10 in September 1968 and spent six consecutive weeks at number-one, becoming the longest-running chart topper of the year.

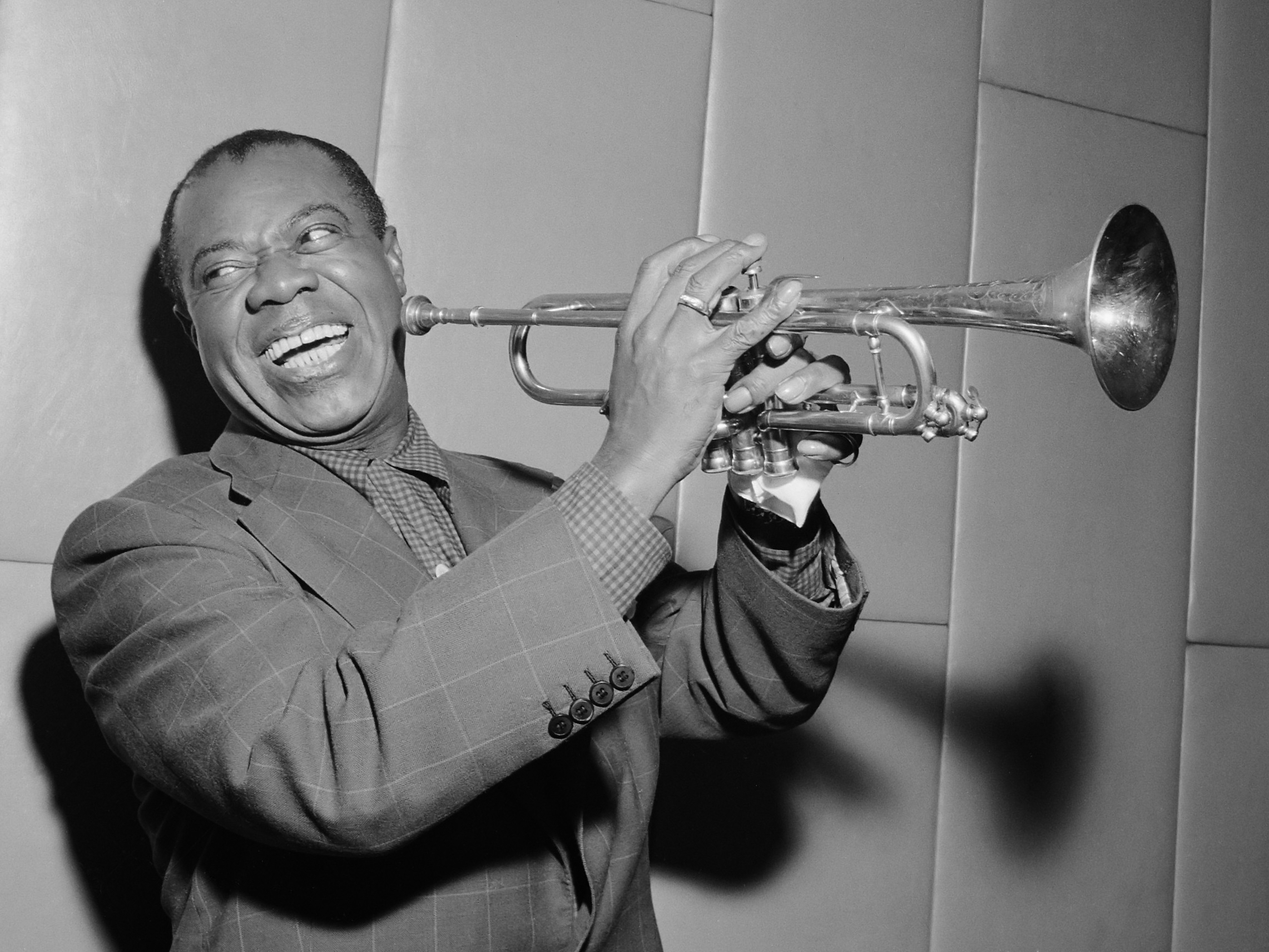
Louis Armstrong secured his only UK number-one single this year with "What a Wonderful World"/"Cabaret", which topped the chart for four weeks. At 66 years and eight months old, Armstrong was, at the time, the oldest artist to have a number-one hit in the UK Singles Chart.

The UK Singles Chart is one of many music charts compiled by the Official Charts Company that calculates the best-selling singles of the week in the United Kingdom. Before 2004, the chart was only based on the sales of physical singles. This list shows singles that peaked in the Top 10 of the UK Singles Chart during 1968, as well as singles which peaked in 1967 and 1969 but were in the top 10 in 1968. The entry date is when the single appeared in the top 10 for the first time (week ending, as published by the Official Charts Company, which is six days after the chart is announced).

One-hundred and nine singles were in the top ten in 1968. Nine singles from 1967 remained in the top 10 for several weeks at the beginning of the year, while "Albatross" by Fleetwood Mac and "Ob-La-Di, Ob-La-Da" by Marmalade were both released in 1968 but did not reach their peak until 1969. "Daydream Believer" by The Monkees, "Thank U Very Much" by The Scaffold and "Walk Away Renée" by Four Tops were the singles from 1967 to reach their peak in 1968. Nineteen artists scored multiple entries in the top 10 in 1968. Amen Corner, Fleetwood Mac, Joe Cocker, Marmalade, Nina Simone and Status Quo were among the many artists who achieved their first UK charting top 10 single in 1968.

The 1967 Christmas number-one, "Hello Goodbye" by The Beatles, remained at number-one for the first three weeks of 1968. The first new number-one single of the year was "The Ballad of Bonnie and Clyde" by Georgie Fame. Overall, twenty different singles peaked at number-one in 1968, with The Beatles (2) having the joint most singles hit that position.

== Background ==
=== Multiple entries ===
One-hundred and eleven singles charted in the top 10 in 1968, with one-hundred and three singles reaching their peak this year.

Nineteen artists scored multiple entries in the top 10 in 1968. The Beatles secured the record for most top 10 hits in 1968 with four hit singles.

Manfred Mann was one of a number of artists with two top-ten entries, including the number-one single "The Mighty Quinn (Quinn the Eskimo)". Amen Corner, Bee Gees, Donovan, Lulu and Status Quo were among the other artists who had multiple top 10 entries in 1968.

=== Chart debuts ===
Forty-nine artists achieved their first top 10 single in 1968, either as a lead or featured artist. Of these, four went on to record another hit single that year: Amen Corner, Don Partridge, Marmalade and Status Quo. Love Affair had two other entries in their breakthrough year.

The following table (collapsed on desktop site) does not include acts who had previously charted as part of a group and secured their first top 10 solo single.

Artist	Number of top 10s	First entry	Chart position	Other entries
Simon Dupree and the Big Sound	1	"Kites"	9	—
Love Affair	3	"Everlasting Love"	1	"Rainbow Valley" (5), "A Day Without Love" (6)
John Fred & His Playboy Band	1	"Judy in Disguise (With Glasses)"	3	—
Plastic Penny	1	"Everything I Am"	6	—
Amen Corner	2	"Bend Me, Shape Me"	3	"High in the Sky" (6)
Solomon King	1	"She Wears My Ring"	3	—
Brenton Wood	1	"Gimme Little Sign"	8	—
Status Quo	2	"Pictures of Matchstick Men"	7	"Ice in the Sun" (8)
Esther & Abi Ofarim	1	"Cinderella Rockefella"	1	—
Don Partridge	2	"Rosie"	4	"Blue Eyes" (3)
The Lemon Pipers	1	"Green Tambourine"	7	—
Otis Redding	1	"(Sittin' On) The Dock of the Bay"	3	—
John Rowles	1	"If I Only Had Time"	3	—
1910 Fruitgum Company	1	"Simon Says"	2	—
Honeybus	1	"I Can't Let Maggie Go"	8	—
Gary Puckett & The Union Gap	1	"Young Girl"	1	"Lady Willpower" (5)
Bobby Goldsboro	1	"Honey"	2	—
Jacky	1	"White Horses"	10	—
Julie Driscoll	1	"This Wheel's on Fire"	5	—
Brian Auger and the Trinity	1	"This Wheel's on Fire"	5	—
The Equals	1	"Baby, Come Back"	1	—
O. C. Smith	1	"The Son of Hickory Holler's Tramp"	2	—
Marmalade	2	"Lovin' Things"	6	"Ob-La-Di, Ob-La-Da" (1) ^{[A]}
Cupid's Inspiration	1	"Yesterday Has Gone"	4	—
Ohio Express	1	"Yummy Yummy Yummy"	5	—
Tommy James and the Shondells	1	"Mony Mony"	1	—
Richard Harris	1	"MacArthur Park"	4	—
The Crazy World of Arthur Brown	1	"Fire"	1	—
Sly and the Family Stone	1	"Dance to the Music"	7	—
Johnny Nash	1	"Hold Me Tight"	5	—
Canned Heat	1	"On the Road Again"	8	—
Mary Hopkin	1	"Those Were the Days"	1	—
The Casuals	1	"Jesamine"	2	—
Leapy Lee	1	"Little Arrows"	2	—
Mason Williams	1	"Classical Gas"	9	—
José Feliciano	1	"Light My Fire"	6	—
Hugo Montenegro	1	"The Good, the Bad and the Ugly"	1	—
Joe Cocker	1	"With a Little Help from My Friends"	1	—
Barry Ryan	1	"Eloise"	2	—
The Marbles	1	"Only One Woman"	5	—
The Isley Brothers	1	"This Old Heart of Mine (Is Weak for You)"	3	—
The Bandwagon	1	"Breakin' Down the Walls of Heartache"	4	—
Nina Simone	1	"Ain't Got No, I Got Life"/"Do What You Gotta Do"	2	—
Malcolm Roberts	1	"May I Have the Next Dream with You"	8	—
Bonzo Dog Doo-Dah Band	1	"I'm the Urban Spaceman"	5	—
Love Sculpture	1	"Sabre Dance"	5	—
Gun	1	"Race with the Devil"	8	—
Fleetwood Mac	1	"Albatross" ^{[B]}	1	—

=== Songs from films ===
Original songs from various films entered the top 10 throughout the year. These included "Mrs. Robinson" (from The Graduate) and "Les Bicyclettes de Belsize" (Les Bicyclettes de Belsize).

Additionally, "The Good, the Bad and the Ugly" from the film of the same name, originally recorded by Ennio Morricone, topped the chart when it was covered by Hugo Montenegro.

=== Best-selling singles ===
Until 1970 there was no universally recognised year-end best-sellers list. However, in 2011 the Official Charts Company released a list of the best-selling single of each year in chart history from 1952 to date. According to the list, "Hey Jude" by The Beatles is officially recorded as the biggest-selling single of 1968.

== Top-ten singles ==
Key

Symbol	Meaning
‡	Single peaked in 1967 but still in chart in 1968.
♦	Single released in 1968 but peaked in 1969.
(#)	Year-end best-selling single.
Entered	The date that the single first appeared in the chart.
Peak	Highest position that the single reached in the UK Singles Chart.

Entered (week ending)	Weeks in top 10	Single	Artist	Peak	Peak reached (week ending)	Weeks at peak
Singles in 1967
22 November 1967	9	"If The Whole World Stopped Loving" ‡	Val Doonican	3	29 November 1967	1
29 November 1967	6	"Something's Gotten Hold of My Heart" ‡	Gene Pitney	5	6 December 1967	3
29 November 1967	9	"Hello, Goodbye" ‡	The Beatles	1	6 December 1967	7
6 December 1967	7	"I'm Coming Home" ‡	Tom Jones	2	20 December 1967	1
13 December 1967	3	"Here We Go Round the Mulberry Bush" ‡ ^{[D]}	Traffic	8	13 December 1967	1
13 December 1967	6	"Thank U Very Much"	The Scaffold	4	3 January 1968	1
20 December 1967	6	"Magical Mystery Tour (EP)" ‡	The Beatles	2	27 December 1967	3
20 December 1967	7	"Daydream Believer"	The Monkees	5	10 January 1968	1
27 December 1967	5	"Walk Away Renée"	Four Tops	3	10 January 1968	1
Singles in 1968
3 January 1968	2	"Kites"	Simon Dupree and the Big Sound	9	3 January 1968	2
3 January 1968	6	"The Ballad of Bonnie and Clyde"	Georgie Fame	1	24 January 1968	1
17 January 1968	7	"Everlasting Love"	Love Affair	1	31 January 1968	2
17 January 1968	6	"Am I That Easy to Forget"	Engelbert Humperdinck	3	24 January 1968	2
24 January 1968	5	"Judy in Disguise (With Glasses)"	John Fred & His Playboy Band	3	7 February 1968	1
24 January 1968	2	"Tin Soldier"	Small Faces	9	24 January 1968	1
24 January 1968	3	"Everything I Am"	Plastic Penny	6	31 January 1968	1
31 January 1968	5	"Bend Me, Shape Me"	Amen Corner	3	14 February 1968	1
31 January 1968	7	"Mighty Quinn"	Manfred Mann	1	14 February 1968	2
31 January 1968	6	"She Wears My Ring"	Solomon King	3	21 February 1968	1
31 January 1968	4	"Suddenly You Love Me" ^{[E]}	The Tremeloes	6	7 February 1968	1
7 February 1968	3	"Gimme Little Sign"	Brenton Wood	8	7 February 1968	2
14 February 1968	4	"Pictures of Matchstick Men"	Status Quo	7	21 February 1968	3
14 February 1968	6	"Fire Brigade"	The Move	3	13 March 1968	1
21 February 1968	7	"Cinderella Rockefella"	Esther & Abi Ofarim	1	28 February 1968	3
28 February 1968	6	"The Legend of Xanadu"	Dave Dee, Dozy, Beaky, Mick & Tich	1	20 March 1968	1
28 February 1968	1	"Words"	Bee Gees	8	28 February 1968	1
6 March 1968	5	"Rosie"	Don Partridge	4	13 March 1968	2
6 March 1968	4	"Jennifer Juniper"	Donovan	5	13 March 1968	1
6 March 1968	3	"Green Tambourine"	The Lemon Pipers	7	13 March 1968	1
13 March 1968	8	"Delilah"	Tom Jones	2	27 March 1968	3
13 March 1968	6	"(Sittin' On) The Dock of the Bay"	Otis Redding	3	27 March 1968	1
13 March 1968	2	"Me, the Peaceful Heart"	Lulu	9	20 March 1968	1
20 March 1968	11	"What a Wonderful World"/"Cabaret"	Louis Armstrong	1	24 April 1968	4
27 March 1968	5	"Lady Madonna"	The Beatles	1	27 March 1968	2
27 March 1968	6	"Congratulations" ^{[F]}	Cliff Richard	1	10 April 1968	2
27 March 1968	3	"If I Were a Carpenter"	Four Tops	7	3 April 1968	1
3 April 1968	3	"Step Inside Love"	Cilla Black	8	10 April 1968	1
10 April 1968	6	"If I Only Had Time"	John Rowles	3	17 April 1968	1
10 April 1968	7	"Simon Says"	1910 Fruitgum Company	2	1 May 1968	1
10 April 1968	5	"Jennifer Eccles"	The Hollies	7	17 April 1968	2
17 April 1968	6	"Can't Take My Eyes Off You"	Andy Williams	5	1 May 1968	1
24 April 1968	2	"I Can't Let Maggie Go"	Honeybus	8	24 April 1968	1
24 April 1968	7	"Lazy Sunday"	Small Faces	2	8 May 1968	1
1 May 1968	8	"A Man Without Love"	Engelbert Humperdinck	2	15 May 1968	3
8 May 1968	6	"I Don't Want Our Loving to Die"	The Herd	5	8 May 1968	1
8 May 1968	9	"Young Girl"	Gary Puckett & The Union Gap	1	22 May 1968	4
8 May 1968	8	"Honey"	Bobby Goldsboro	2	29 May 1968	1
15 May 1968	2	"White Horses" ^{[G]}	Jacky	10	15 May 1968	2
22 May 1968	4	"Rainbow Valley"	Love Affair	5	5 June 1968	2
29 May 1968	2	"Joanna"	Scott Walker	7	5 June 1968	1
29 May 1968	4	"Do You Know the Way to San Jose"	Dionne Warwick	8	5 June 1968	2
29 May 1968	5	"This Wheel's on Fire"	Julie Driscoll with Brian Auger and the Trinity	5	19 June 1968	1
5 June 1968	7	"Jumpin' Jack Flash"	The Rolling Stones	1	19 June 1968	2
12 June 1968	5	"Blue Eyes"	Don Partridge	3	19 June 1968	1
12 June 1968	5	"Hurdy Gurdy Man"	Donovan	4	19 June 1968	3
19 June 1968	7	"Baby, Come Back"	The Equals	1	3 July 1968	3
19 June 1968	9	"I Pretend"	Des O'Connor	1	24 July 1968	1
26 June 1968	6	"The Son of Hickory Holler's Tramp"	O. C. Smith	2	3 July 1968	3
26 June 1968	3	"Lovin' Things"	Marmalade	6	3 July 1968	1
3 July 1968	4	"Yesterday Has Gone"	Cupid's Inspiration	4	10 July 1968	2
3 July 1968	3	"My Name Is Jack"	Manfred Mann	8	10 July 1968	1
10 July 1968	4	"Yummy Yummy Yummy"	Ohio Express	5	17 July 1968	2
17 July 1968	8	"Mony Mony"	Tommy James and the Shondells	1	31 July 1968	3
17 July 1968	4	"MacArthur Park"	Richard Harris	4	24 July 1968	2
17 July 1968	8	"Fire"	The Crazy World of Arthur Brown	1	14 August 1968	1
24 July 1968	8	"This Guy's in Love with You" ^{[H]}	Herb Alpert	3	14 August 1968	4
24 July 1968	4	"Mrs. Robinson"	Simon & Garfunkel	4	7 August 1968	1
31 July 1968	4	"I Close My Eyes and Count to Ten"	Dusty Springfield	4	14 August 1968	1
31 July 1968	3	"Last Night in Soho"	Dave Dee, Dozy, Beaky, Mick & Tich	8	31 July 1968	1
7 August 1968	6	"Help Yourself"	Tom Jones	5	21 August 1968	3
7 August 1968	4	"Sunshine Girl"	Herman's Hermits	8	14 August 1968	2
14 August 1968	3	"Dance to the Music"	Sly and the Family Stone	7	14 August 1968	1
21 August 1968	6	"Do It Again"	The Beach Boys	1	28 August 1968	1
21 August 1968	7	"I've Gotta Get a Message to You"	Bee Gees	1	4 September 1968	1
21 August 1968	4	"High in the Sky" ^{[I]}	Amen Corner	6	4 September 1968	1
27 August 1968	6	"I Say a Little Prayer"	Aretha Franklin	4	4 September 1968	3
4 September 1968	6	"Hold Me Tight"	Johnny Nash	5	11 September 1968	3
4 September 1968	4	"On the Road Again"	Canned Heat	8	11 September 1968	2
11 September 1968	9	"Hey Jude" (#1)	The Beatles	1	11 September 1968	2
11 September 1968	11	"Those Were the Days"	Mary Hopkin	1	25 September 1968	6
18 September 1968	8	"Jesamine" ^{[J]}	The Casuals	2	16 October 1968	1
18 September 1968	6	"Lady Willpower"	Gary Puckett & The Union Gap	5	9 October 1968	2
25 September 1968	7	"Little Arrows"	Leapy Lee	2	9 October 1968	1
2 October 1968	3	"The Red Balloon"	The Dave Clark Five	7	9 October 1968	1
9 October 1968	4	"My Little Lady"	The Tremeloes	6	9 October 1968	2
9 October 1968	1	"Ice in the Sun"	Status Quo	8	9 October 1968	1
9 October 1968	1	"Classical Gas"	Mason Williams	9	9 October 1968	1
16 October 1968	3	"Les Bicyclettes de Belsize"	Engelbert Humperdinck	5	23 October 1968	1
16 October 1968	2	"A Day Without Love"	Love Affair	6	23 October 1968	1
16 October 1968	5	"Light My Fire"	José Feliciano	6	30 October 1968	1
23 October 1968	10	"The Good, the Bad and the Ugly"	Hugo Montenegro	1	13 November 1968	4
30 October 1968	5	"With a Little Help from My Friends"	Joe Cocker	1	6 November 1968	1
30 October 1968	4	"Only One Woman"	The Marbles	5	30 October 1968	1
6 November 1968	6	"Eloise"	Barry Ryan	2	20 November 1968	2
6 November 1968	7	"This Old Heart of Mine (Is Weak for You)"	The Isley Brothers	3	20 November 1968	2
6 November 1968	4	"All Along the Watchtower"	The Jimi Hendrix Experience	5	27 November 1968	1
13 November 1968	5	"Breakin' Down the Walls of Heartache"	The Bandwagon	4	20 November 1968	1
20 November 1968	3	"Elenore"	The Turtles	7	20 November 1968	1
20 November 1968	9	"Ain't Got No, I Got Life"/"Do What You Gotta Do"	Nina Simone	2	18 December 1968	1
27 November 1968	10	"Lily the Pink"	The Scaffold	1	11 December 1968	4
27 November 1968	2	"I'm a Tiger"	Lulu	9	27 November 1968	2
4 December 1968	5	"1–2–3 O'Leary"	Des O'Connor	4	11 December 1968	3
4 December 1968	1	"May I Have the Next Dream With You"	Malcolm Roberts	8	4 December 1968	1
11 December 1968	8	"Build Me Up Buttercup"	The Foundations	2	25 December 1968	2
11 December 1968	7	"I'm the Urban Spaceman"	Bonzo Dog Doo-Dah Band	5	18 December 1968	3
18 December 1968	5	"Sabre Dance"	Love Sculpture	5	25 December 1968	1
18 December 1968	2	"Race with the Devil"	Gun	8	18 December 1968	1
18 December 1968	9	"Ob-La-Di, Ob-La-Da" ♦	Marmalade	1	1 January 1969	3
25 December 1968	10	"Albatross" ♦	Fleetwood Mac	1	29 January 1969	1

== Entries by artist ==
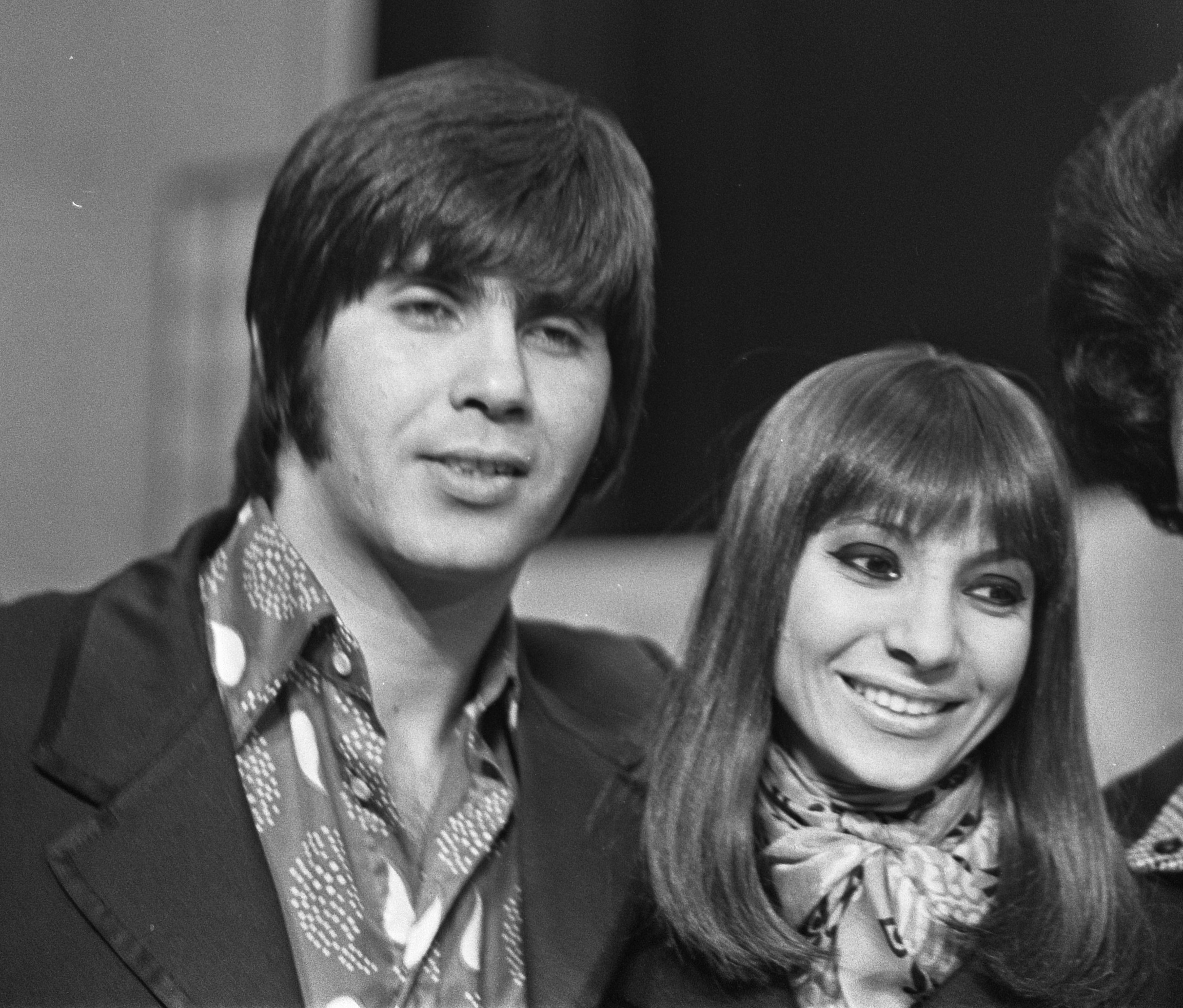
In 1968, husband and wife duo Esther & Abi Ofarim became the first and only act from Israel to achieve a UK number-one single with "Cinderella Rockefella", which spent three weeks at the top of the chart.

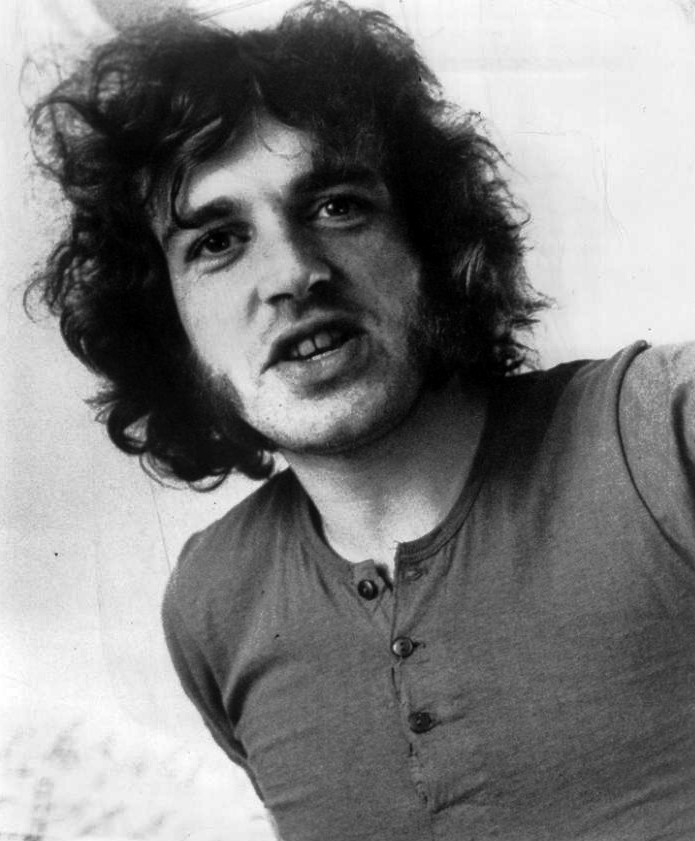
Joe Cocker earned his first top 10 hit this year with his cover version of The Beatles' "With a Little Help from My Friends", which reached number-one for one week in November.

The following table shows artists who achieved two or more top 10 entries in 1968, including singles that reached their peak in 1967 or 1969. The figures include both main artists and featured artists. The total number of weeks an artist spent in the top ten in 1968 is also shown.

Entries	Artist	Weeks	Singles
4	The Beatles ^{[K]}	24	"Hello, Goodbye", "Hey Jude", "Lady Madonna", "Magical Mystery Tour (EP)"
3	Engelbert Humperdinck	17	"Am I That Easy to Forget", "A Man Without Love", "Les Bicyclettes de Belsize"
3	Love Affair	13	"A Day Without Love", "Everlasting Love", "Rainbow Valley"
3	Tom Jones ^{[K]}	18	"Delilah", "Help Yourself", "I'm Coming Home"
2	Amen Corner	9	"Bend Me, Shape Me", "High in the Sky"
2	Bee Gees	8	"I've Gotta Get a Message to You", "Words"
2	Dave Dee, Dozy, Beaky, Mick & Tich	9	"Last Night in Soho", "The Legend of Xanadu"
2	Des O'Connor	13	"1-2-3 O'Leary", "I Pretend"
2	Don Partridge	10	"Blue Eyes", "Rosie"
2	Donovan	9	"Hurdy Gurdy Man", "Jennifer Juniper"
2	Four Tops ^{[K]}	8	"If I Were a Carpenter", "Walk Away Renée"
2	Gary Puckett & The Union Gap	15	"Lady Willpower", "Young Girl"
2	Lulu	4	"I'm a Tiger", "Me, the Peaceful Heart"
2	Manfred Mann	10	"My Name Is Jack", "Mighty Quinn"
2	Marmalade ^{[N]}	5	"Lovin' Things", "Ob-La-Di, Ob-La-Da"
2	The Scaffold ^{[M]}	9	"Lily the Pink", "Thank U Very Much"
2	Small Faces	9	"Lazy Sunday", "Tin Soldier"
2	Status Quo	5	"Ice in the Sun", "Pictures of Matchstick Men"
2	The Tremeloes	5	"My Little Lady", "Suddenly You Love Me"

== Notes ==
- ^{a} "Ob-La-Di, Ob-La-Da" reached its peak of number-one on 1 January 1969 (week ending).
- ^{b} "Albatross" reached its peak of number one on 29 January 1969 (week ending).
- ^{d} "Here We Go Round the Mulberry Bush" re-entered the top 10 at number 10 on 10 January 1968 (week ending).
- ^{e} "Suddenly You Love Me" re-entered the top 10 at number 10 on 28 February 1968 (week ending).
- ^{f} "Congratulations" was the United Kingdom's entry at the Eurovision Song Contest in 1968.
- ^{g} "White Horses" was the theme song to the UK dub of the German/Yugoslavian television series "The White Horses".
- ^{h} "This Guy's in Love with You" re-entered the top 10 at number 5 on 7 August 1968 (week ending) for 7 weeks.
- ^{i} "High in the Sky" re-entered the top 10 at number 10 on 2 October 1968 (week ending).
- ^{j} "Jesamine" re-entered the top 10 at number 10 on 13 November 1968 (week ending).
- ^{k} Figure includes single that peaked in 1967.
- ^{l} Figure includes single that first charted in 1967 but peaked in 1968.
- ^{m} Figure includes single that peaked in 1969.

== See also ==
- 1968 in British music
- List of number-one singles from the 1960s (UK)
