= Lists of UK top-ten singles =

List of UK top-ten singles is a series of lists showing all the singles that have reached the top 10 on the UK Singles Chart in a particular year. Before 1969, there was no single officially recognised chart, but the New Musical Express (1952–1959) and Record Retailer (1960–1969) are considered the canonical source for the data.

Elvis Presley holds the record for the most top 10 singles of all time, followed by Cliff Richard and Madonna.

== 1950s ==
- List of UK top-ten singles in 1952
- List of UK top-ten singles in 1953
- List of UK top-ten singles in 1954
- List of UK top-ten singles in 1955
- List of UK top-ten singles in 1956
- List of UK top-ten singles in 1957
- List of UK top-ten singles in 1958
- List of UK top-ten singles in 1959

== 1960s ==
- List of UK top-ten singles in 1960
- List of UK top-ten singles in 1961
- List of UK top-ten singles in 1962
- List of UK top-ten singles in 1963
- List of UK top-ten singles in 1964
- List of UK top-ten singles in 1965
- List of UK top-ten singles in 1966
- List of UK top-ten singles in 1967
- List of UK top-ten singles in 1968
- List of UK top-ten singles in 1969

== 1970s ==
- List of UK top-ten singles in 1970
- List of UK top-ten singles in 1971
- List of UK top-ten singles in 1972
- List of UK top-ten singles in 1973
- List of UK top-ten singles in 1974
- List of UK top-ten singles in 1975
- List of UK top-ten singles in 1976
- List of UK top-ten singles in 1977
- List of UK top-ten singles in 1978
- List of UK top-ten singles in 1979

== 1980s ==
- List of UK top-ten singles in 1980
- List of UK top-ten singles in 1981
- List of UK top-ten singles in 1982
- List of UK top-ten singles in 1983
- List of UK top-ten singles in 1984
- List of UK top-ten singles in 1985
- List of UK top-ten singles in 1986
- List of UK top-ten singles in 1987
- List of UK top-ten singles in 1988
- List of UK top-ten singles in 1989

== 1990s ==
- List of UK top-ten singles in 1990
- List of UK top-ten singles in 1991
- List of UK top-ten singles in 1992
- List of UK top-ten singles in 1993
- List of UK top-ten singles in 1994
- List of UK top-ten singles in 1995
- List of UK top-ten singles in 1996
- List of UK top-ten singles in 1997
- List of UK top-ten singles in 1998
- List of UK top-ten singles in 1999

== 2000s ==
- List of UK top-ten singles in 2000
- List of UK top-ten singles in 2001
- List of UK top-ten singles in 2002
- List of UK top-ten singles in 2003
- List of UK top-ten singles in 2004
- List of UK top-ten singles in 2005
- List of UK top-ten singles in 2006
- List of UK top-ten singles in 2007
- List of UK top-ten singles in 2008
- List of UK top-ten singles in 2009

== 2010s ==
- List of UK top-ten singles in 2010
- List of UK top-ten singles in 2011
- List of UK top-ten singles in 2012
- List of UK top-ten singles in 2013
- List of UK top-ten singles in 2014
- List of UK top-ten singles in 2015
- List of UK top-ten singles in 2016
- List of UK top-ten singles in 2017
- List of UK top-ten singles in 2018
- List of UK top-ten singles in 2019

== 2020s ==
- List of UK top-ten singles in 2020
- List of UK top-ten singles in 2021
- List of UK top-ten singles in 2022
- List of UK top-ten singles in 2023
- List of UK top-ten singles in 2024
- List of UK top-ten singles in 2025
- List of UK top-ten singles in 2026
