= 13 Smash Hits =

Studio album by Tom Jones
- Released: 1 December 1967
- Genres: Pop, blue-eyed soul
- Label: Decca
- Producer: Peter Sullivan

Tom Jones chronology
Funny Familiar Forgotten Feelings (1967)	13 Smash Hits (1967)	Delilah (1968)

Singles from 13 Smash Hits
- 1. "I'll Never Fall in Love Again" Released: 1 August 1967

13 Smash Hits is a studio album by Welsh singer Tom Jones, released in December 1967 on Decca Records.

Despite the title, it is not a compilation album but an assortment of covers of hits by other singers that completement Jones' recent hit "I'll Never Fall in Love Again".

The album spent 49 weeks on the UK official albums chart, peaking at number 5.

== Track listing ==
Side 1
No.	Title	Writer(s)	Length
1.	"Don't Fight It"	Cropper, Pickett	2:57
2.	"You Keep Me Hanging On"	Holland, Dozier, Holland	2:46
3.	"Hold On, I'm Coming"	Hayes Jnr. Porter	3:21
4.	"I Was Made to Love Her"	Cosby, Hardaway, Wonder, Moy	2:23
5.	"Keep On Running"	Edwards	2:51
6.	"Get Ready"	Robinson	2:29

Side 2
No.	Title	Writer(s)	Length
1.	"I'll Never Fall in Love Again"	Currie, Donegan	4:17
2.	"I Know"	Stutz, Lindeman	3:58
3.	"I Wake Up Crying"	Bacharach, David	2:21
4.	"Funny How Time Slips Away"	Nelson	3:42
5.	"Danny Boy"	Trad. (Arr. by Blackwell, Weatherly)	3:57
6.	"It's a Man's Man's Man's World"	Brown, Jones	2:42
7.	"Yesterday"	Lennon, McCartney	2:47

== Charts ==
Chart (1967–1968)	Peak position
UK Albums (Official Charts)	5
