= List of UK top-ten singles in 1969 =

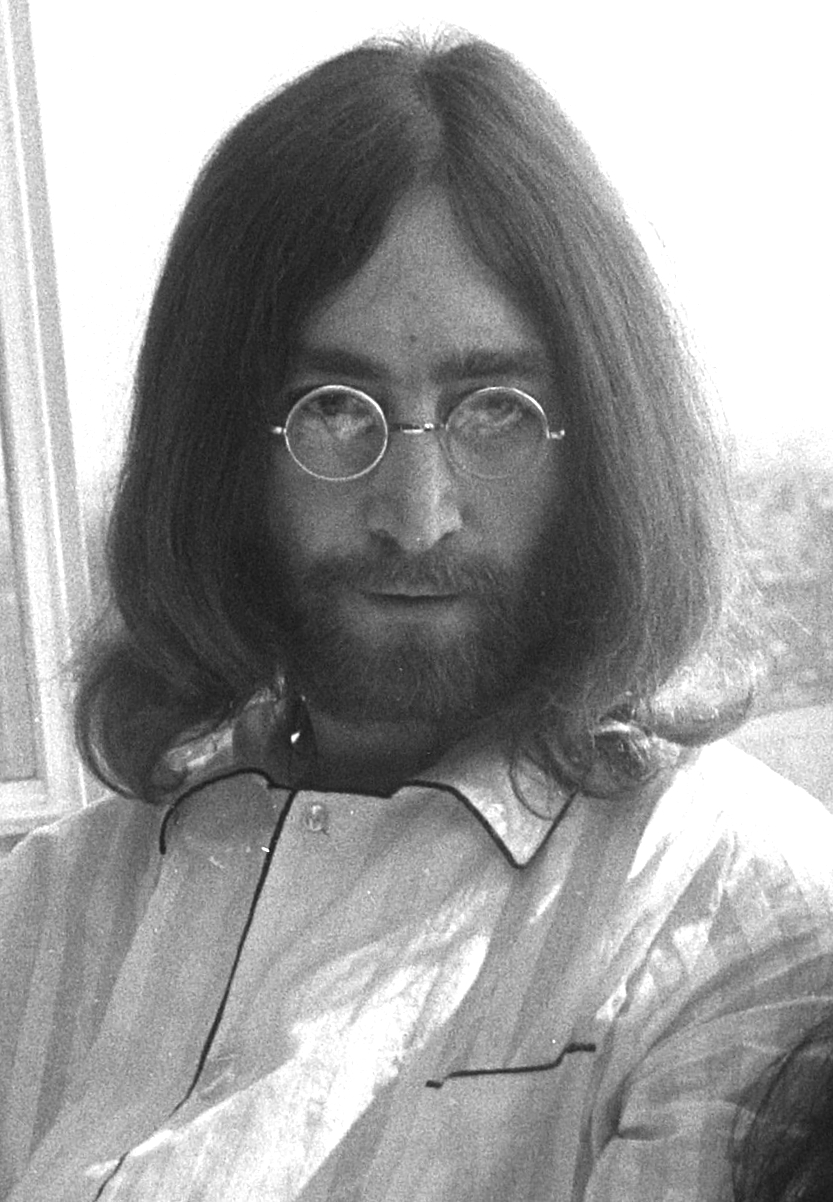
John Lennon had four UK top 10 singles in 1969, the most of any artist this year. Three of these were as part of The Beatles, of which two topped the chart: "Get Back" and "The Ballad of John and Yoko".

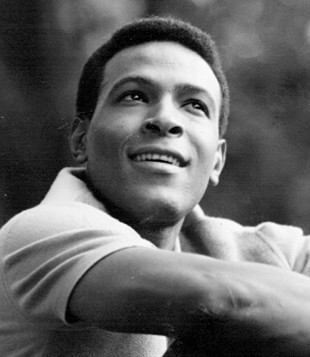
Marvin Gaye made the UK top 10 for the first time this year with three singles making the countdown, including "I Heard It Through the Grapevine", which spent three weeks at number-one.

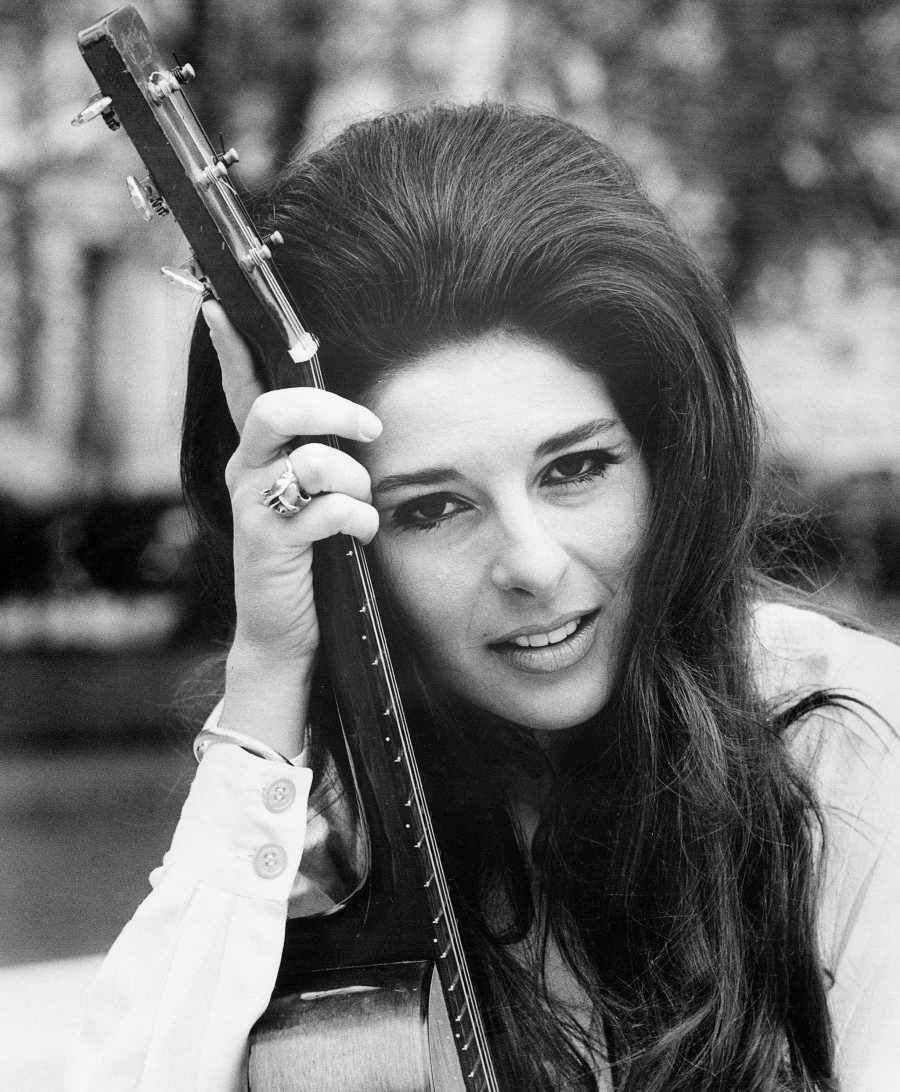
Bobbie Gentry secured two UK top 10 singles in 1969, including chart-topper "I'll Never Fall in Love Again".

The UK Singles Chart is one of many music charts compiled by the Official Charts Company that calculates the best-selling singles of the week in the United Kingdom. Before 2004, the chart was only based on the sales of physical singles. This list shows singles that peaked in the Top 10 of the UK Singles Chart during 1969, as well as singles which peaked in 1968 and 1970 but were in the top 10 in 1969. The entry date is when the single appeared in the top 10 for the first time (week ending, as published by the Official Charts Company, which is six days after the chart is announced).

One-hundred and fourteen singles were in the top ten in 1969. Eight singles from 1968 remained in the top 10 for several weeks at the beginning of the year while "All I Have to Do Is Dream" by Bobbie Gentry and Glen Campbell, "Melting Pot" by Blue Mink, "Suspicious Minds" by Elvis Presley and "Tracy" by The Cuff Links were all released in 1969 but did not reach their peak until 1970. "Albatross" by Fleetwood Mac and "Ob-La-Di, Ob-La-Da" by Marmalade were the singles from 1968 to reach their peak in 1969. Thirty artists scored multiple entries in the top 10 in 1969. David Bowie, Glen Campbell, Jethro Tull, Johnny Cash, Marvin Gaye and Plastic Ono Band were among the many artists who achieved their first UK charting top 10 single in 1969.

The 1968 Christmas number-one, "Lily the Pink" by The Scaffold, remained in the top 10 for the first weeks of 1969. The first new number-one single of the year was "Ob-La-Di, Ob-La-Da" by Marmalade. Overall, eighteen different singles peaked at number-one in 1969, with The Beatles (2) having the joint most singles hit that position.

== Background ==
=== Multiple entries ===
One-hundred and fifteen singles charted in the top 10 in 1969, with one-hundred and five singles reaching their peak this year.

Thirty-one artists scored multiple entries in the top 10 in 1969. John Lennon secured the record for most top 10 hits in 1969 with four hit singles.

Amen Corner was one of a number of artists with two top-ten entries, including the number-one single "(If Paradise Is) Half as Nice". The Beach Boys, Elvis Presley, Marmalade. Simon & Garfunkel and The Temptations were among the other artists who had multiple top 10 entries in 1969.

=== Controversial French-language song reaches number-one ===
1969 saw a foreign-language song reach number-one in the UK Singles Chart for the first time in the chart's history; "Je t'aime... moi non plus" by Jane Birkin and Serge Gainsbourg. The controversial French-language song was banned in several countries due to its overtly sexual content.

"Je t'aime..." was originally released in the UK by Fontana Records and the Fontana release entered the UK top 10 at number eight on 31 August 1969 (6 September 1969, week ending). However, after it had reached number two, Fontana deleted the single, allegedly because the wife of Fontana's boss was appalled at her husband's company releasing such a song. After this, "Je t'aime..." was picked up by Major Minor Records, who acquired the song's licensing rights and re-released the record. On 28 September 1969 (4 October 1969, week ending), the Major Minor release entered the UK chart at number three, while the Fontana release dropped out of the top 10 completely. The following week, the Major Minor release reached number-one, where it remained for one week.

=== Chart debuts ===
Forty-five artists achieved their first top 10 single in 1969, either as a lead or featured artist. Of these, eight went on to record another hit single that year: Bobbie Gentry, Clodagh Rodgers, Creedence Clearwater Revival, Desmond Dekker & the Aces, Glen Campbell, Jethro Tull, Peter Sarstedt and The Temptations. Marvin Gaye had two other entries in his breakthrough year.

The following table (collapsed on desktop site) does not include acts who had previously charted as part of a group and secured their first top 10 solo single.

Artist	Number of top 10s	First entry	Chart position	Other entries
Judy Clay	1	"Private Number"	8	—
William Bell	1	"Private Number"	8	—
Martha and the Vandellas	1	"Dancing in the Street"	4	—
The Temptations	2	"I'm Gonna Make You Love Me"	3	"Get Ready" (10)
Donald Peers	1	"Please Don't Go"	3	—
Peter Sarstedt	2	"Where Do You Go To (My Lovely)?"	1	"Frozen Orange Juice" (10)
Glen Campbell	2	"Wichita Lineman"	7	"All I Have to Do Is Dream" (3) ^{[A]}
Marvin Gaye	3	"I Heard It Through the Grapevine"	1	"Too Busy Thinking About My Baby" (5), "The Onion Song" (9)
Joe South	1	"Games People Play"	6	—
Desmond Dekker & the Aces	2	"Israelites"	1	"It Miek" (7)
Noel Harrison	1	"The Windmills of Your Mind"	8	—
Billy Preston	1	"Get Back"	1	—
Clodagh Rodgers	2	"Come Back and Shake Me"	3	"Goodnight Midnight" (4)
Bob & Earl	1	"Harlem Shuffle"	7	—
The Edwin Hawkins Singers	1	"Oh Happy Day"	2	—
Booker T. & the M.G.'s	1	"Time Is Tight"	4	—
Smokey Robinson	1	"The Tracks of My Tears"	9	—
The Miracles	1	"The Tracks of My Tears"	9	—
Jethro Tull	2	"Living in the Past"	3	"Sweet Dream" (7)
Thunderclap Newman	1	"Something in the Air"	1	—
Creedence Clearwater Revival	2	"Proud Mary"	8	"Bad Moon Rising" (1)
The Family Dogg	1	"A Way of Life"	6	—
Plastic Ono Band	1	"Give Peace a Chance"	2	—
Joe Dolan	1	"Make Me an Island"	3	—
Vanity Fare	1	"Early in the Morning"	8	—
Max Romeo	1	"Wet Dream"	10	—
Zager and Evans	1	"In the Year 2525 (Exordium & Terminus)"	1	—
Jane Birkin	1	"Je t'aime... moi non plus"	1	—
Serge Gainsbourg	1	"Je t'aime... moi non plus"	1	—
Humble Pie	1	"Natural Born Bugie"	4	—
Oliver	1	"Good Morning Starshine"	6	—
Bobbie Gentry	2	"I'll Never Fall in Love Again"	1	"All I Have to Do Is Dream" (3) ^{[A]}
Johnny Cash	1	"A Boy Named Sue"	4	—
Hank Marvin	1	"Throw Down a Line"	7	—
Karen Young	1	"Nobody's Child"	6	—
Lou Christie	1	"I'm Gonna Make You Mine"	2	—
David Bowie	1	"Space Oddity"	5	—
The Archies	1	"Sugar, Sugar"	1	—
The Upsetters	1	"Return of Django"/"Dollar in the Teeth"	5	—
Jimmy Cliff	1	"Wonderful World, Beautiful People"	6	—
Kenny Rogers and the First Edition	1	"Ruby, Don't Take Your Love to Town"	2	—
Harry J All Stars	1	"The Liquidator"	9	—
Blue Mink	1	"Melting Pot" ^{[B]}	3	—
Tammi Terrell	1	"The Onion Song"	9	—
The Cuff Links	1	"Tracy" ^{[C]}	4	—

Notes

Robin Gibb was a member of the chart-topping British group Bee Gees, who had their first top 10 entry in 1967. His number two single "Saved by the Bell" was his debut appearance in the chart as a solo artist. Cass Elliot (known professionally as Mama Cass) sang in the band The Mamas & the Papas from 1965 to 1968 until they broke up. "It's Getting Better" was her only solo recording to reach the top 10 on the UK chart.

=== Songs from films ===
Original songs from various films entered the top 10 throughout the year. These included "The Windmills of Your Mind" (from The Thomas Crown Affair) and "Time Is Tight" (UpTight).

=== Best-selling singles ===
Until 1970 there was no universally recognised year-end best-sellers list. However, in 2011 the Official Charts Company released a list of the best-selling single of each year in chart history from 1952 to date. According to the list, "Sugar, Sugar" by The Archies is officially recorded as the biggest-selling single of 1969.

== Top-ten singles ==
Key

Symbol	Meaning
‡	Single peaked in 1968 but still in chart in 1969.
♦	Single released in 1969 but peaked in 1970.
(#)	Year-end best-selling single.
Entered	The date that the single first appeared in the chart.
Peak	Highest position that the single reached in the UK Singles Chart.

Entered (week ending)	Weeks in top 10	Single	Artist	Peak	Peak reached (week ending)	Weeks at peak
Singles in 1968
20 November 1968	9	"Ain't Got No, I Got Life"/"Do What You Gotta Do" ‡	Nina Simone	2	18 December 1968	1
27 November 1968	10	"Lily the Pink" ‡	The Scaffold	1	11 December 1968	4
11 December 1968	8	"Build Me Up Buttercup" ‡	The Foundations	2	25 December 1968	2
11 December 1968	7	"I'm the Urban Spaceman" ‡	Bonzo Dog Doo-Dah Band	5	18 December 1968	3
18 December 1968	5	"Sabre Dance" ‡	Love Sculpture	5	25 December 1968	1
18 December 1968	9	"Ob-La-Di, Ob-La-Da"	Marmalade	1	1 January 1969	3
25 December 1968	10	"Albatross"	Fleetwood Mac	1	29 January 1969	1
Singles in 1969
1 January 1969	2	"Son of a Preacher Man"	Dusty Springfield	9	1 January 1969	2
1 January 1969	5	"Something's Happening"	Herman's Hermits	6	15 January 1969	2
8 January 1969	7	"For Once in My Life"	Stevie Wonder	3	22 January 1969	3
15 January 1969	3	"Private Number"	Judy Clay & William Bell	8	22 January 1969	2
22 January 1969	6	"Blackberry Way"	The Move	1	5 February 1969	1
22 January 1969	2	"Fox on the Run"	Manfred Mann	5	29 January 1969	1
29 January 1969	4	"You Got Soul"	Johnny Nash	6	5 February 1969	1
5 February 1969	4	"Dancing in the Street"	Martha and the Vandellas	4	5 February 1969	1
5 February 1969	2	"To Love Somebody"	Nina Simone	5	5 February 1969	1
5 February 1969	6	"I'm Gonna Make You Love Me"	Diana Ross & the Supremes & The Temptations	3	19 February 1969	2
5 February 1969	7	"Please Don't Go"	Donald Peers	3	5 March 1969	1
5 February 1969	1	"Mrs. Robinson (EP)"	Simon & Garfunkel	9	5 February 1969	1
12 February 1969	4	"(If Paradise Is) Half as Nice"	Amen Corner	1	12 February 1969	2
19 February 1969	7	"Where Do You Go To (My Lovely)?"	Peter Sarstedt	1	26 February 1969	4
19 February 1969	5	"The Way It Used to Be"	Engelbert Humperdinck	3	12 March 1969	2
26 February 1969	4	"Wichita Lineman"	Glen Campbell	7	5 March 1969	1
26 February 1969	1	"I'll Pick a Rose for My Rose"	Marv Johnson	10	26 February 1969	1
5 March 1969	4	"Surround Yourself with Sorrow"	Cilla Black	3	26 March 1969	1
5 March 1969	9	"I Heard It Through the Grapevine"	Marvin Gaye	1	26 March 1969	3
5 March 1969	5	"Monsieur Dupont"	Sandie Shaw	6	2 April 1969	1
5 March 1969	8	"Gentle on My Mind"	Dean Martin	2	2 April 1969	1
12 March 1969	4	"First of May"	Bee Gees	6	12 March 1969	1
19 March 1969	1	"You've Lost That Lovin' Feelin'" ^{[D]}	The Righteous Brothers	10	19 March 1969	1
26 March 1969	4	"Sorry Suzanne"	The Hollies	3	2 April 1969	1
26 March 1969	4	"Games People Play"	Joe South	6	26 March 1969	1
26 March 1969	6	"Boom Bang-a-Bang" ^{[E]}	Lulu	2	9 April 1969	1
26 March 1969	1	"Get Ready"	The Temptations	10	26 March 1969	1
2 April 1969	7	"Israelites"	Desmond Dekker & The Aces	1	16 April 1969	1
2 April 1969	4	"In the Bad Bad Old Days (Before You Loved Me)"	The Foundations	8	9 April 1969	2
9 April 1969	7	"Goodbye"	Mary Hopkin	2	16 April 1969	3
9 April 1969	6	"Pinball Wizard"	The Who	4	23 April 1969	3
9 April 1969	1	"I Can Hear Music"	The Beach Boys	10	9 April 1969	1
16 April 1969	3	"The Windmills of Your Mind"	Noel Harrison	8	30 April 1969	1
23 April 1969	9	"Get Back"	The Beatles with Billy Preston	1	23 April 1969	6
23 April 1969	6	"Come Back and Shake Me"	Clodagh Rodgers	3	7 May 1969	1
30 April 1969	2	"Cupid"	Johnny Nash	6	30 April 1969	1
30 April 1969	1	"Harlem Shuffle"	Bob & Earl	7	30 April 1969	1
7 May 1969	5	"My Sentimental Friend"	Herman's Hermits	2	14 May 1969	2
7 May 1969	6	"Man of the World"	Fleetwood Mac	2	28 May 1969	1
7 May 1969	5	"Behind a Painted Smile"	The Isley Brothers	5	21 May 1969	1
7 May 1969	7	"My Way"	Frank Sinatra	5	28 May 1969	2
14 May 1969	6	"The Boxer"	Simon & Garfunkel	6	4 June 1969	1
21 May 1969	6	"Dizzy"	Tommy Roe	1	4 June 1969	1
21 May 1969	4	"Ragamuffin Man"	Manfred Mann	8	28 May 1969	1
28 May 1969	1	"Love Me Tonight"	Tom Jones	9	28 May 1969	1
4 June 1969	6	"The Ballad of John and Yoko"	The Beatles	1	11 June 1969	3
4 June 1969	5	"Oh Happy Day"	The Edwin Hawkins Singers	2	18 June 1969	2
11 June 1969	5	"Time Is Tight"	Booker T. & the M.G.'s	4	18 June 1969	2
11 June 1969	2	"The Tracks of My Tears" ^{[F]}	Smokey Robinson & The Miracles	9	11 June 1969	1
18 June 1969	4	"Living in the Past"	Jethro Tull	3	25 June 1969	1
18 June 1969	1	"Big Ship"	Cliff Richard	8	18 June 1969	1
18 June 1969	8	"In the Ghetto"	Elvis Presley	2	2 July 1969	3
25 June 1969	6	"Something in the Air"	Thunderclap Newman	1	2 July 1969	3
25 June 1969	4	"Break Away"	The Beach Boys	6	9 July 1969	1
25 June 1969	4	"Proud Mary"	Creedence Clearwater Revival	8	9 July 1969	1
2 July 1969	4	"A Way of Life"	The Family Dogg	6	16 July 1969	1
2 July 1969	1	"Frozen Orange Juice"	Peter Sarstedt	10	2 July 1969	1
9 July 1969	4	"Hello Susie"	Amen Corner	4	9 July 1969	1
9 July 1969	11	"Honky Tonk Women"	The Rolling Stones	1	23 July 1969	5
16 July 1969	6	"Give Peace a Chance"	Plastic Ono Band	2	23 July 1969	3
16 July 1969	4	"It Miek"	Desmond Dekker & The Aces	7	16 July 1969	2
16 July 1969	4	"Baby Make It Soon"	Marmalade	9	16 July 1969	4
23 July 1969	8	"Saved by the Bell"	Robin Gibb	2	16 August 1969	2
23 July 1969	5	"Goodnight Midnight"	Clodagh Rodgers	4	9 August 1969	1
2 August 1969	5	"Make Me an Island"	Joe Dolan	3	16 August 1969	1
9 August 1969	6	"My Cherie Amour"	Stevie Wonder	4	23 August 1969	3
9 August 1969	3	"Conversations"	Cilla Black	7	16 August 1969	1
16 August 1969	3	"Early in the Morning"	Vanity Fare	8	16 August 1969	1
16 August 1969	1	"Bringing on Back the Good Times"	Love Affair	9	16 August 1969	1
16 August 1969	1	"Wet Dream"	Max Romeo	10	16 August 1969	1
23 August 1969	7	"In the Year 2525 (Exordium & Terminus)"	Zager and Evans	1	30 August 1969	3
23 August 1969	6	"Too Busy Thinking About My Baby"	Marvin Gaye	5	13 September 1969	1
30 August 1969	5	"Viva Bobby Joe"	The Equals	6	30 August 1969	1
30 August 1969	7	"Bad Moon Rising"	Creedence Clearwater Revival	1	20 September 1969	3
30 August 1969	7	"Don't Forget to Remember"	Bee Gees	2	20 September 1969	1
6 September 1969	9	"Je t'aime... moi non plus" ^{[G]}	Jane Birkin & Serge Gainsbourg	1	11 October 1969	1
6 September 1969	4	"Natural Born Bugie"	Humble Pie	4	13 September 1969	1
20 September 1969	5	"Good Morning Starshine"	Oliver	6	4 October 1969	2
20 September 1969	8	"I'll Never Fall in Love Again"	Bobbie Gentry	1	18 October 1969	1
27 September 1969	6	"A Boy Named Sue"	Johnny Cash	4	4 October 1969	3
4 October 1969	2	"Throw Down a Line"	Cliff Richard & Hank Marvin	7	4 October 1969	1
4 October 1969	2	"It's Getting Better"	Mama Cass	8	4 October 1969	1
4 October 1969	4	"Lay Lady Lay"	Bob Dylan	5	11 October 1969	1
11 October 1969	7	"Nobody's Child"	Karen Young	6	18 October 1969	2
18 October 1969	5	"I'm Gonna Make You Mine"	Lou Christie	2	1 November 1969	1
18 October 1969	5	"He Ain't Heavy, He's My Brother"	The Hollies	3	1 November 1969	1
18 October 1969	4	"Space Oddity"	David Bowie	5	1 November 1969	1
18 October 1969	8	"Oh Well"	Fleetwood Mac	2	8 November 1969	2
25 October 1969	14	"Sugar, Sugar" (#1)	The Archies	1	25 October 1969	8
1 November 1969	5	"Return of Django"/"Dollar in the Teeth"	The Upsetters	5	8 November 1969	3
8 November 1969	2	"Love's Been Good to Me"	Frank Sinatra	8	8 November 1969	2
8 November 1969	1	"Delta Lady"	Joe Cocker	10	8 November 1969	1
15 November 1969	6	"(Call Me) Number One"	The Tremeloes	2	22 November 1969	2
15 November 1969	4	"Something"/"Come Together"	The Beatles	4	22 November 1969	1
15 November 1969	4	"Wonderful World, Beautiful People" ^{[H]}	Jimmy Cliff	6	22 November 1969	1
22 November 1969	3	"Sweet Dream"	Jethro Tull	7	22 November 1969	1
22 November 1969	12	"Ruby, Don't Take Your Love to Town"	Kenny Rogers and the First Edition	2	13 December 1969	6
22 November 1969	8	"Yester-Me, Yester-You, Yesterday"	Stevie Wonder	2	6 December 1969	1
29 November 1969	2	"The Liquidator" ^{[I]}	Harry J All Stars	9	29 November 1969	1
6 December 1969	12	"Two Little Boys"	Rolf Harris	1	20 December 1969	6
6 December 1969	8	"Melting Pot" ♦	Blue Mink	3	10 January 1970	1
6 December 1969	9	"Suspicious Minds" ♦	Elvis Presley	2	17 January 1970	1
13 December 1969	4	"Winter World of Love"	Engelbert Humperdinck	7	13 December 1969	1
13 December 1969	1	"The Onion Song"	Marvin Gaye & Tammi Terrell	9	13 December 1969	1
20 December 1969	6	"Tracy" ♦	The Cuff Links	4	10 January 1970	1
20 December 1969	7	"All I Have to Do Is Dream" ♦	Bobbie Gentry & Glen Campbell	3	17 January 1970	1
27 December 1969	2	"Without Love (There is Nothing)"	Tom Jones	10	27 December 1969	2

== Entries by artist ==
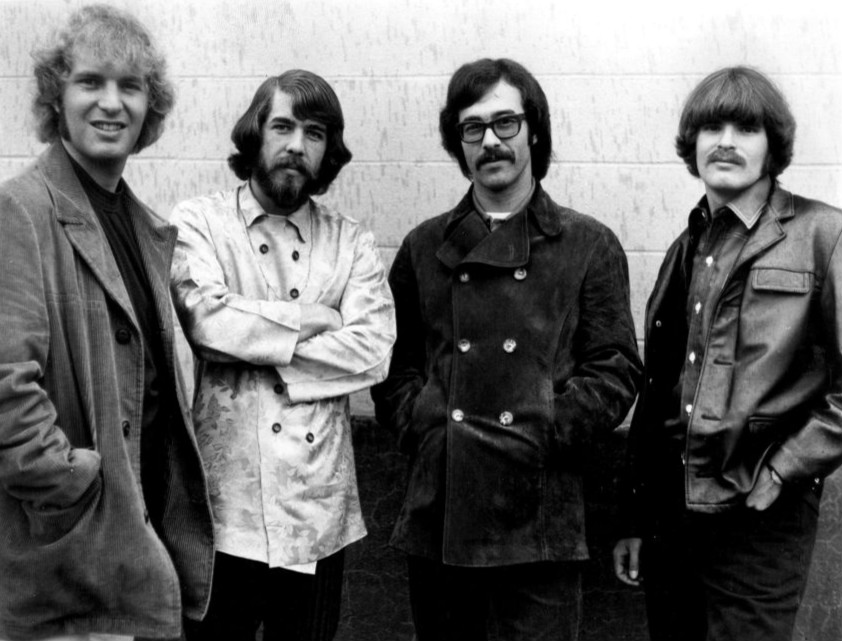
Creedence Clearwater Revival earned two UK top 10 hits this year, including "Bad Moon Rising", which spent three weeks at number-one.

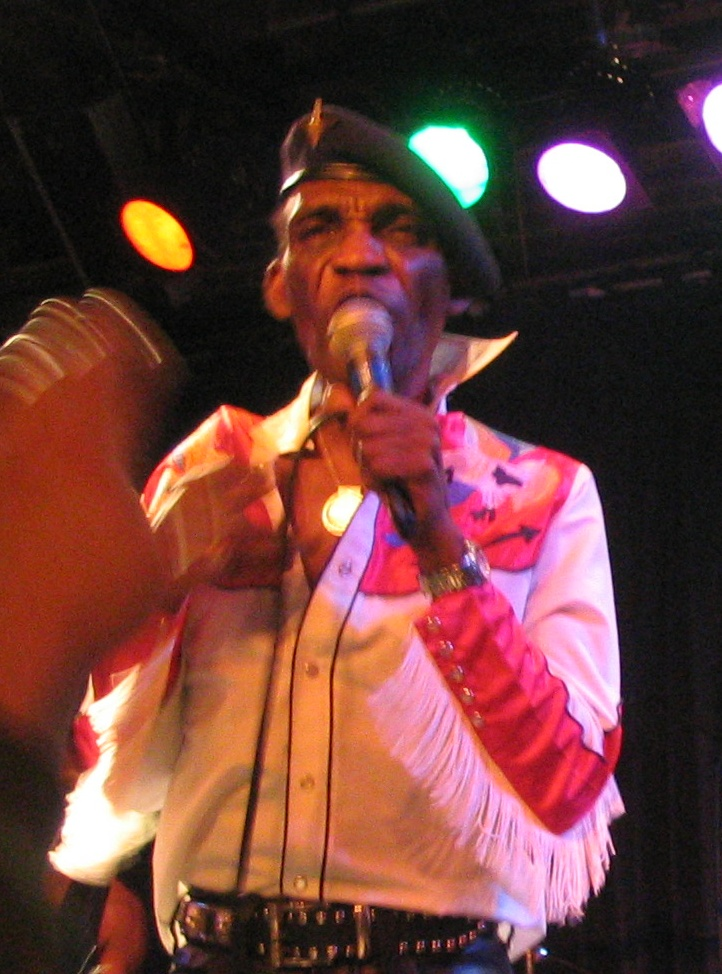
Desmond Dekker (pictured in 2005) became the first reggae artist to have a number-one hit in the UK Singles Chart when his song "Israelites" reached the top spot for one week in April 1969. Dekker achieved a second top 10 hit in July with "It Miek", which peaked at number seven.

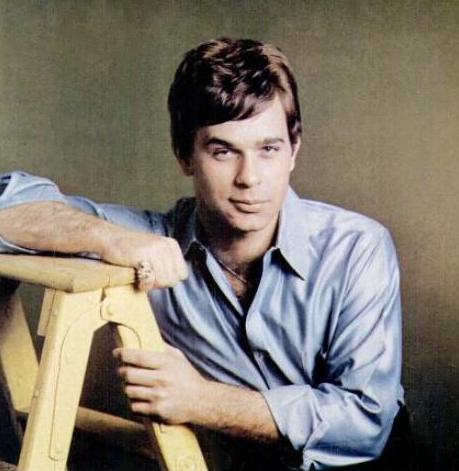
Lou Christie reached the UK top 10 for the only time in his career in October of this year with "I'm Gonna Make You Mine", which peaked at number two.

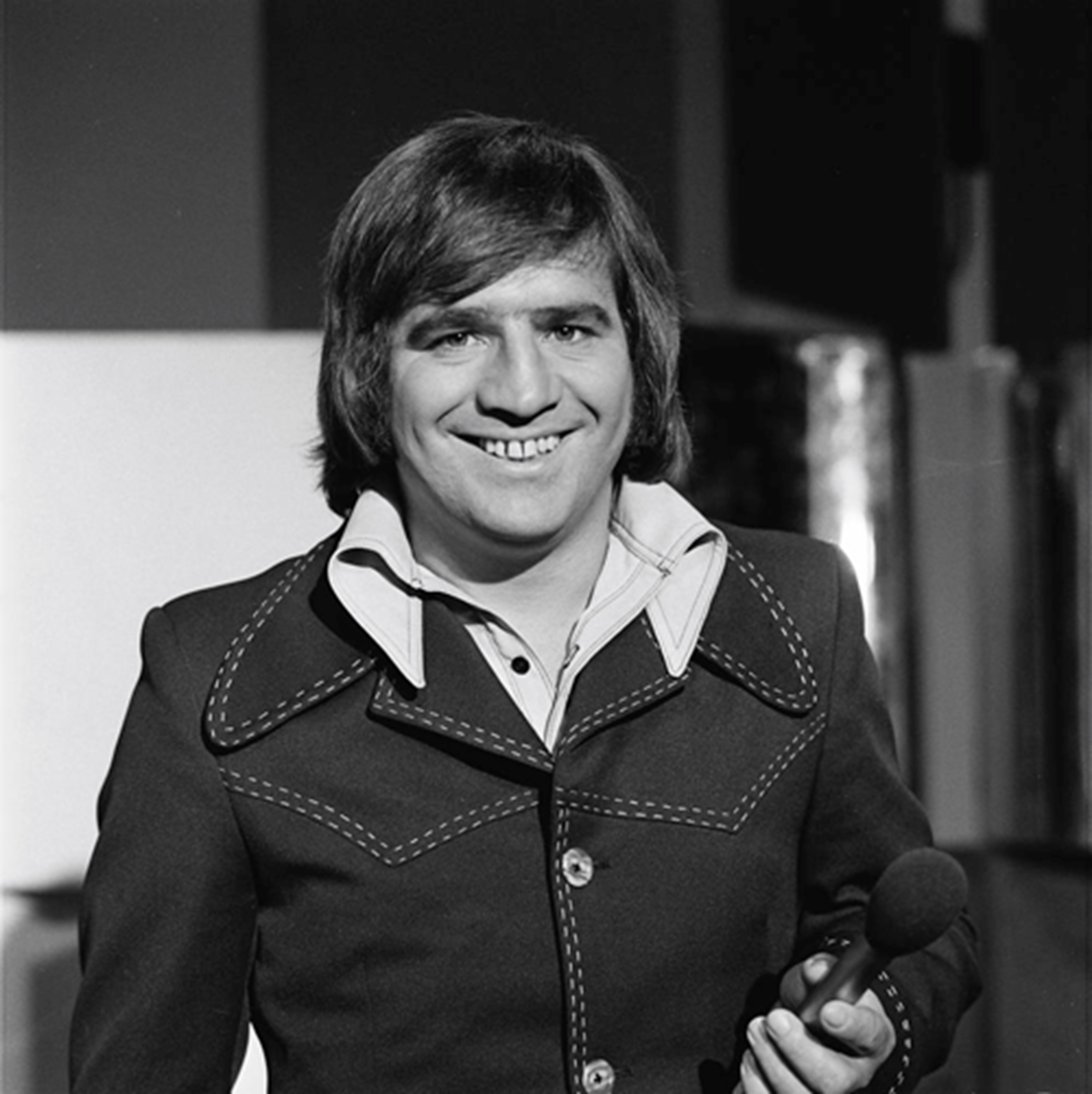
Irish singer Joe Dolan (pictured in 1975) achieved his only UK top 10 single in 1969 with "Make Me an Island", which peaked at number three in August.

The following table shows artists who achieved two or more top 10 entries in 1969, including singles that reached their peak in 1968 or 1970. The figures include both main artists and featured artists, while appearances on ensemble charity records are also counted for each artist. The total number of weeks an artist spent in the top ten in 1969 is also shown.

Entries	Artist	Weeks	Singles
4	John Lennon ^{[K]}	26	"Get Back", "Give Peace a Chance", "Something"/"Come Together", "The Ballad of John and Yoko"
3	The Beatles	19	"Get Back", "Something"/"Come Together", "The Ballad of John and Yoko"
3	Fleetwood Mac ^{[J]}	23	"Albatross", "Man of the World", "Oh Well"
3	Marvin Gaye	16	"I Heard It Through the Grapevine", "The Onion Song", "Too Busy Thinking About My Baby"
3	Stevie Wonder	19	"For Once in My Life", "My Cherie Amour", "Yester-Me, Yester-You, Yesterday"
2	Amen Corner	8	"Hello Susie", "(If Paradise Is) Half as Nice"
2	The Beach Boys	5	"Break Away", "I Can Hear Music"
2	Bee Gees	11	"Don't Forget to Remember", "First of May"
2	Bobbie Gentry ^{[M]}	10	"All I Have to Do Is Dream", "I'll Never Fall in Love Again"
2	Cilla Black	7	"Conversations", "Surround Yourself with Sorrow"
2	Cliff Richard	3	"Big Ship", "Throw Down a Line"
2	Clodagh Rodgers	11	"Come Back and Shake Me", "Goodnight Midnight"
2	Creedence Clearwater Revival	11	"Bad Moon Rising", "Proud Mary"
2	Desmond Dekker & the Aces	11	"It Miek", "Israelites"
2	Elvis Presley ^{[M]}	12	"In the Ghetto", "Suspicious Minds"
2	Engelbert Humperdinck	8	"The Way It Used to Be", "Winter World of Love"
2	The Foundations ^{[N]}	9	"Build Me Up Buttercup", "In the Bad Bad Old Days (Before You Loved Me)"
2	Frank Sinatra	9	"Love's Been Good to Me", "My Way"
2	Glen Campbell ^{[M]}	6	"All I Have to Do Is Dream", "Wichita Lineman"
2	Herman's Hermits	10	"My Sentimental Friend", "Something's Happening"
2	The Hollies	10	"He Ain't Heavy, He's My Brother", "Sorry Suzanne"
2	Jethro Tull	7	"Living in the Past", "Sweet Dream"
2	Johnny Nash	6	"Cupid", "You Got Soul"
2	Manfred Mann	6	"Fox on the Run", "Ragamuffin Man"
2	Marmalade ^{[J]}	11	"Baby Make It Soon", "Ob-La-Di, Ob-La-Da"
2	Nina Simone ^{[N]}	5	"Ain't Got No, I Got Life"/"Do What You Gotta Do", "To Love Somebody"
2	Peter Sarstedt	8	"Frozen Orange Juice", "Where Do You Go To (My Lovely)?"
2	Robin Gibb ^{[L]}	12	"First of May", "Saved by the Bell"
2	Simon & Garfunkel	7	"Mrs. Robinson (EP)", "The Boxer"
2	The Temptations	7	"Get Ready", "I'm Gonna Make You Love Me"
2	Tom Jones	3	"Love Me Tonight", "Without Love (There is Nothing)"

== Notes ==
- ^{a} "All I Have to Do Is Dream" reached its peak of number three on 17 January 1970 (week ending).
- ^{b} "Melting Pot" reached its peak of number three on 10 January 1970 (week ending).
- ^{c} "Tracy" reached its peak of number four on 10 January 1970 (week ending).
- ^{d} "You've Lost That Lovin' Feelin'" originally peaked at number-one on its initial release in 1965.
- ^{e} "Boom Bang-a-Bang" was the United Kingdom's winning entry (tied) at the Eurovision Song Contest in 1969.
- ^{f} "The Tracks of My Tears" re-entered the top 10 at number 10 on 25 June 1969 (week ending).
- ^{g} "Je t'aime... moi non plus" was originally released in the UK by Fontana Records and the Fontana release enjoyed a four-week run in the top 10 from 6 September 1969 (week ending). After Fontana deleted the single during its UK chart ascent, it was picked up by Major Minor Records, who acquired the song's licensing rights and re-released the record. The Major Minor release enjoyed a five-week run in the top 10 from 4 October 1969 (week ending) and reached number-one on 11 October 1969 (week ending).
- ^{h} "Wonderful World, Beautiful People" re-entered the top 10 at number 10 on 13 December 1969 (week ending).
- ^{i} "The Liquidator" re-entered the top 10 at number 10 on 10 January 1970 (week ending).
- ^{j} Figure includes single that first charted in 1968 but peaked in 1969.
- ^{k} Figure includes three top 10 hits with the group The Beatles.
- ^{l} Figure includes appearance on "First of May" by Bee Gees.
- ^{m} Figure includes single that peaked in 1970.
- ^{n} Figure includes single that peaked in 1968.

== See also ==
- 1969 in British music
- List of number-one singles from the 1960s (UK)
