= List of UK top-ten singles in 1967 =

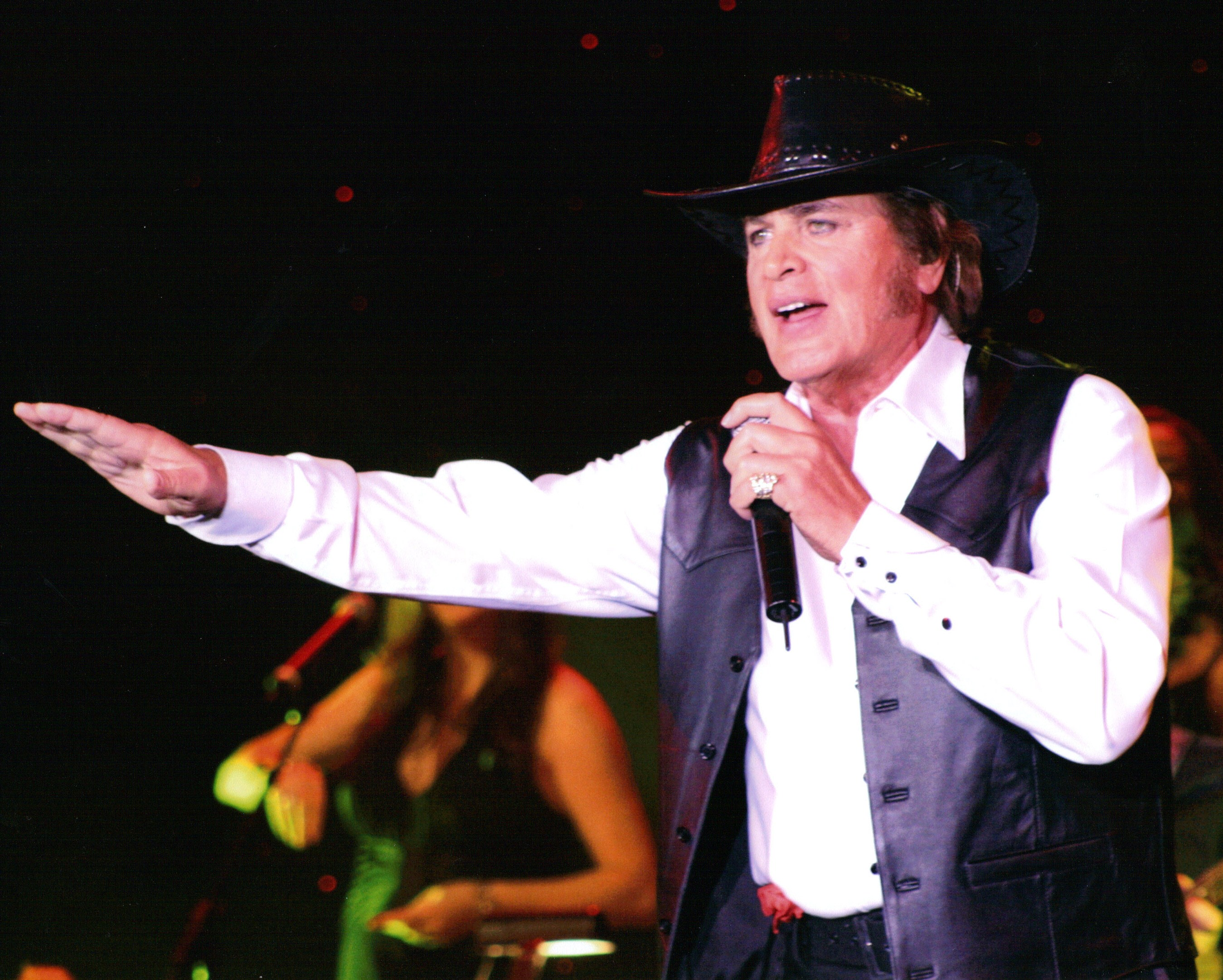
Engelbert Humperdinck made his arrival into the UK Singles Chart in 1967, scoring three top 10 singles, including the number-one hits "Release Me" and "The Last Waltz". "Release Me" became the year's best-selling single and went on to be ranked as the eighth biggest-seller of the 1960s.

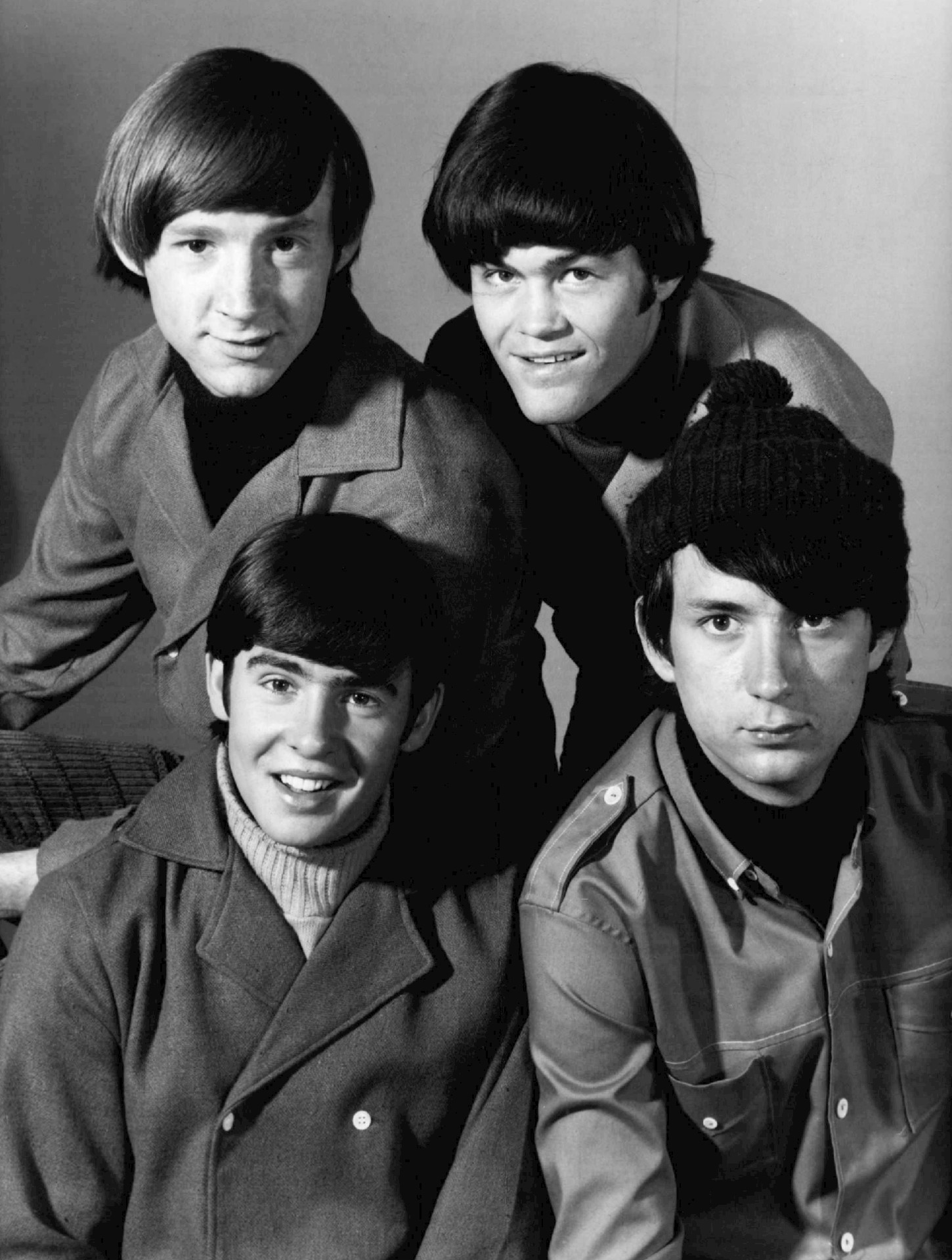
The Monkees reached the UK chart with four top 10 singles this year, with their debut entry "I'm a Believer" spending four weeks at number-one.

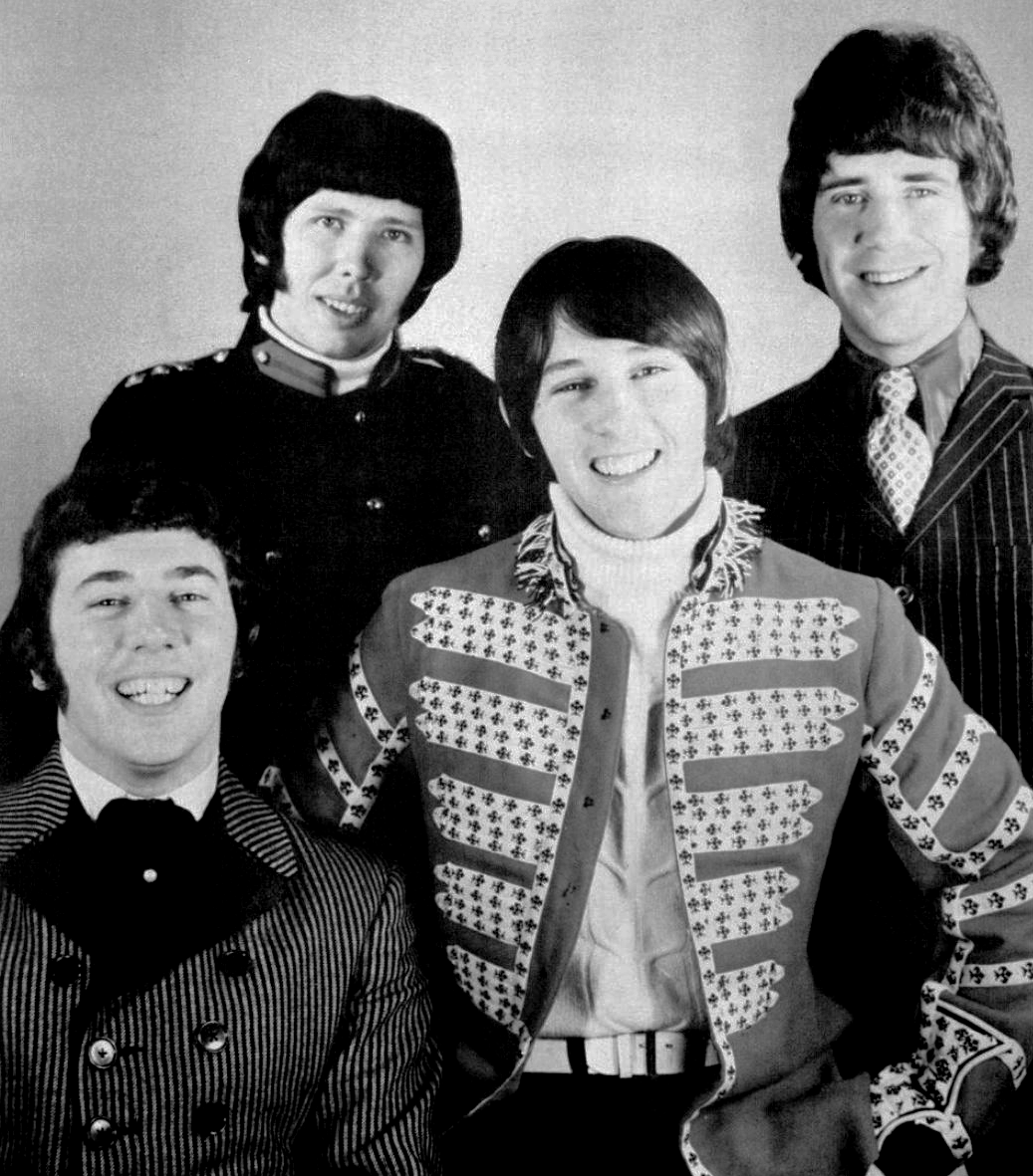
The Tremeloes had three top 10 singles in 1967, the highest-charting of which was chart-topper "Silence is Golden".

The UK Singles Chart is one of many music charts compiled by the Official Charts Company that calculates the best-selling singles of the week in the United Kingdom. Before 2004, the chart was only based on the sales of physical singles. This list shows singles that peaked in the Top 10 of the UK Singles Chart during 1967, as well as singles which peaked in 1966 and 1968 but were in the top 10 in 1967. The entry date is when the single appeared in the top 10 for the first time (week ending, as published by the Official Charts Company, which is six days after the chart is announced).

One-hundred and fifteen singles were in the top ten in 1967. Eight singles from 1966 remained in the top 10 for several weeks at the beginning of the year, while "Daydream Believer" by The Monkees, "Thank U Very Much" by The Scaffold and "Walk Away Renée" by Four Tops were all released in 1967 but did not reach their peak until 1968. Twenty-nine artists scored multiple entries in the top 10 in 1967. Aretha Franklin, Bee Gees, Cat Stevens, Engelbert Humperdinck, The Monkees and Stevie Wonder were among the many artists who achieved their first UK charting top 10 single in 1967.

The 1966 Christmas number-one, "Green, Green Grass of Home" by Tom Jones, remained at number one for the first two weeks of 1967. The first new number-one single of the year was "I'm A Believer" by The Monkees. Overall, fourteen different singles peaked at number-one in 1967, with Engelbert Humperdinck and The Beatles (2) having the joint most singles hit that position.

== Background ==
=== Multiple entries ===
One-hundred and sixteen singles charted in the top 10 in 1967, with one-hundred and five singles reaching their peak this year. "This is My Song" was recorded by Petula Clark and Harry Secombe and both versions reached the top 10.

Twenty-nine artists scored multiple entries in the top 10 in 1967. Tom Jones secured the record for most top 10 hits in 1967 with five hit singles.

Nancy Sinatra was one of a number of artists with two top-ten entries, including the number-one single "Somethin' Stupid" (with Frank Sinatra). The Beach Boys, Cat Stevens, Procol Harum, The Rolling Stones and Val Doonican were among the other artists who had multiple top 10 entries in 1967.

=== Chart debuts ===
Thirty-three artists achieved their first top 10 single in 1967, either as a lead or featured artist. Of these, three went on to record another hit single that year: Bee Gees, Cat Stevens and Procol Harum. Engelbert Humperdinck, The Jimi Hendrix Experience, The Move and Traffic all had two more top 10 singles in 1967. The Monkees had three other entries in their breakthrough year.

The following table (collapsed on desktop site) does not include acts who had previously charted as part of a group and secured their first top 10 solo single.

Artist	Number of top 10s	First entry	Chart position	Other entries
The Monkees	4	"I'm a Believer"	1	"A Little Bit Me, a Little Bit You" (3), "Alternate Title" (2), "Daydream Believer" (5) ^{[A]}
The Move	3	"Night of Fear"	2	"I Can Hear the Grass Grow" (5), "Flowers in the Rain" (2)
Cat Stevens	2	"Matthew and Son"	2	"I'm Gonna Get Me a Gun" (6)
The Jimi Hendrix Experience	3	"Hey Joe"	6	"Purple Haze" (3), "The Wind Cries Mary" (6)
The Royal Guardsmen	1	"Snoopy vs. the Red Baron"	8	—
Engelbert Humperdinck	3	"Release Me"	1	"There Goes My Everything" (2), "The Last Waltz" (2)
Vince Hill	1	"Edelweiss"	2	—
Whistling Jack Smith	1	"I Was Kaiser Bill's Batman"	5	—
The Dubliners	1	"Seven Drunken Nights"	7	—
Procol Harum	2	"A Whiter Shade of Pale"	1	"Homburg" (6)
Arthur Conley	1	"Sweet Soul Music"	7	—
Traffic	3	"Paper Sun"	5	"Hole in My Shoe" (2), "Here We Go Round the Mulberry Bush" (8)
The Turtles	1	"She'd Rather Be with Me"	4	—
The Young Rascals	1	"Groovin'"	8	—
Vikki Carr	1	"It Must Be Him (Seul sur son étoile)"	2	—
Topol	1	"If I Were a Rich Man (from "Fiddler on the Roof")"	9	—
Pink Floyd	1	"See Emily Play"	6	—
Aretha Franklin	1	"Respect"	10	—
Scott McKenzie	1	"San Francisco (Be Sure to Wear Flowers in Your Hair)"	1	—
The Young Idea	1	"With a Little Help from My Friends"	10	—
The Johnny Mann Singers	1	"Up, Up and Away"	6	—
Stevie Wonder	1	"I Was Made to Love Her"	5	—
Anita Harris	1	"Just Loving You"	6	—
Keith West	1	"Excerpt from A Teenage Opera"	2	—
The Flower Pot Men	1	"Let's Go to San Francisco"	4	—
Bee Gees	2	"Massachusetts"	1	"World" (9)
The Box Tops	1	"The Letter"	5	—
The Herd	1	"From the Underworld"	6	—
The Foundations	1	"Baby, Now That I've Found You"	1	—
Long John Baldry	1	"Let the Heartaches Begin"	1	—
Des O'Connor	1	"Careless Hands"	6	—
The Scaffold	1	"Thank U Very Much" ^{[B]}	4	—

Notes

Harry Secombe had previously achieved two top 10 singles as a member of The Goons, but his cover version of "This is My Song" marked his first and only top 10 appearance as a solo artist. Dave Davies was the lead guitarist for the rock band The Kinks. "Death of a Clown" was his debut solo single, peaking at number three. "Reflections" was the first single for The Supremes under their new name, Diana Ross & the Supremes. "San Franciscan Nights" was billed as Eric Burdon and The Animals - Burdon was a vocalist in the group.

=== Songs from films ===
Original songs from various films entered the top 10 throughout the year. These included "The Happening" (from The Happening), "Here We Go Round the Mulberry Bush" (Here We Go Round the Mulberry Bush) and "I've Been a Bad, Bad Boy" (Privilege).

Additionally, Vince Hill recorded a version of "Edelweiss" from The Sound of Music, with the song reaching number two in the chart.

=== Best-selling singles ===
Until 1970 there was no universally recognised year-end best-sellers list. However, in 2011 the Official Charts Company released a list of the best-selling single of each year in chart history from 1952 to date. According to the list, "Release Me" by Engelbert Humperdinck is officially recorded as the biggest-selling single of 1967. "Release Me" (8) also ranked in the top 10 best-selling singles of the decade.

== Top-ten singles ==
Key

Symbol	Meaning
‡	Single peaked in 1966 but still in chart in 1967.
♦	Single released in 1967 but peaked in 1968.
(#)	Year-end best-selling single.
Entered	The date that the single first appeared in the chart.
Peak	Highest position that the single reached in the UK Singles Chart.

Entered (week ending)	Weeks in top 10	Single	Artist	Peak	Peak reached (week ending)	Weeks at peak
Singles in 1966
17 November 1966	13	"Green, Green Grass of Home" ‡	Tom Jones	1	1 December 1966	7
24 November 1966	8	"What Would I Be" ‡	Val Doonican	2	15 December 1966	1
1 December 1966	5	"My Mind's Eye" ‡ ^{[C]}	Small Faces	4	8 December 1966	2
8 December 1966	9	"Morningtown Ride" ‡	The Seekers	2	22 December 1966	3
15 December 1966	5	"Dead End Street" ‡	The Kinks	5	22 December 1966	2
15 December 1966	4	"You Keep Me Hangin' On" ‡	The Supremes ^{[D]}	8	22 December 1966	2
22 December 1966	5	"Sunshine Superman" ‡	Donovan	2	29 December 1966	1
22 December 1966	5	"Save Me" ‡	Dave Dee, Dozy, Beaky, Mick & Tich	3	29 December 1966	1
Singles in 1967
5 January 1967	5	"Happy Jack"	The Who	3	19 January 1967	1
5 January 1967	4	"In the Country"	Cliff Richard & The Shadows	6	19 January 1967	1
12 January 1967	9	"I'm a Believer"	The Monkees	1	19 January 1967	4
12 January 1967	2	"Any Way That You Want Me"	The Troggs	8	12 January 1967	1
19 January 1967	5	"Night of Fear"	The Move	2	26 January 1967	1
19 January 1967	3	"Standing in the Shadows of Love"	Four Tops	6	26 January 1967	1
26 January 1967	5	"Matthew and Son"	Cat Stevens	2	2 February 1967	2
26 January 1967	5	"Let's Spend the Night Together"/"Ruby Tuesday"	The Rolling Stones	3	9 February 1967	2
26 January 1967	3	"Hey Joe"	The Jimi Hendrix Experience	6	2 February 1967	2
2 February 1967	3	"I've Been a Bad, Bad Boy"	Paul Jones	5	9 February 1967	1
9 February 1967	9	"This Is My Song"	Petula Clark	1	16 February 1967	2
9 February 1967	1	"I'm a Man"	The Spencer Davis Group	9	9 February 1967	1
9 February 1967	2	"Sugar Town"	Nancy Sinatra	8	16 February 1967	1
16 February 1967	11	"Release Me" (#1)	Engelbert Humperdinck	1	2 March 1967	6
16 February 1967	5	"Snoopy vs. the Red Baron"	The Royal Guardsmen	8	23 February 1967	1
16 February 1967	5	"Here Comes My Baby"	The Tremeloes	4	23 February 1967	2
23 February 1967	7	"Penny Lane"/"Strawberry Fields Forever"	The Beatles	2	2 March 1967	3
23 February 1967	2	"Peek-A-Boo"	The New Vaudeville Band	7	23 February 1967	1
23 February 1967	3	"Mellow Yellow"	Donovan	8	2 March 1967	1
2 March 1967	7	"Edelweiss"	Vince Hill	2	23 March 1967	1
2 March 1967	4	"On a Carousel"	The Hollies	4	16 March 1967	1
9 March 1967	3	"There's a Kind of Hush"	Herman's Hermits	7	16 March 1967	1
16 March 1967	4	"Georgy Girl"	The Seekers	3	23 March 1967	1
16 March 1967	1	"Detroit City"	Tom Jones	8	16 March 1967	1
23 March 1967	4	"Simon Smith and the Amazing Dancing Bear"	The Alan Price Set	4	30 March 1967	1
23 March 1967	4	"I Was Kaiser Bill's Batman"	Whistling Jack Smith	5	30 March 1967	1
23 March 1967	5	"This Is My Song"	Harry Secombe	2	30 March 1967	1
30 March 1967	9	"Puppet on a String" ^{[F]}	Sandie Shaw	1	27 April 1967	3
30 March 1967	9	"Somethin' Stupid"	Nancy Sinatra & Frank Sinatra	1	13 April 1967	2
13 April 1967	5	"A Little Bit Me, a Little Bit You"	The Monkees	3	20 April 1967	2
13 April 1967	4	"Ha! Ha! Said the Clown"	Manfred Mann	4	20 April 1967	2
13 April 1967	2	"It's All Over"	Cliff Richard	9	13 April 1967	2
20 April 1967	5	"Purple Haze"	The Jimi Hendrix Experience	3	4 May 1967	1
20 April 1967	2	"Bernadette"	Four Tops	8	20 April 1967	1
20 April 1967	3	"I'm Gonna Get Me a Gun"	Cat Stevens	6	27 April 1967	1
27 April 1967	3	"I Can Hear the Grass Grow"	The Move	5	4 May 1967	1
27 April 1967	8	"Dedicated to the One I Love"	The Mamas & the Papas	2	18 May 1967	1
4 May 1967	3	"Funny Familiar Forgotten Feelings"	Tom Jones	7	18 May 1967	1
4 May 1967	4	"The Boat That I Row"	Lulu	6	11 May 1967	2
11 May 1967	8	"Silence Is Golden"	The Tremeloes	1	18 May 1967	3
11 May 1967	5	"Pictures of Lily"	The Who	4	18 May 1967	1
18 May 1967	3	"Seven Drunken Nights"	The Dubliners	7	25 May 1967	1
18 May 1967	6	"Waterloo Sunset"	The Kinks	2	25 May 1967	2
25 May 1967	5	"Then I Kissed Her"	The Beach Boys	4	25 May 1967	1
25 May 1967	3	"The Wind Cries Mary"	The Jimi Hendrix Experience	6	1 June 1967	1
1 June 1967	10	"A Whiter Shade of Pale"	Procol Harum	1	8 June 1967	6
1 June 1967	9	"There Goes My Everything"	Engelbert Humperdinck	2	15 June 1967	4
1 June 1967	5	"The Happening"	The Supremes ^{[D]}	6	8 June 1967	2
8 June 1967	3	"Sweet Soul Music"	Arthur Conley	7	15 June 1967	1
15 June 1967	5	"Carrie Anne"	The Hollies	3	22 June 1967	2
15 June 1967	4	"Okay!"	Dave Dee, Dozy, Beaky, Mick & Tich	4	29 June 1967	1
22 June 1967	3	"Paper Sun"	Traffic	5	29 June 1967	1
29 June 1967	7	"She'd Rather Be with Me"	The Turtles	4	5 July 1967	1
29 June 1967	7	"Alternate Title" ^{[G]}	The Monkees	2	19 July 1967	1
29 June 1967	2	"Groovin'"	The Young Rascals	8	29 June 1967	1
5 July 1967	7	"It Must Be Him"	Vikki Carr	2	26 July 1967	1
5 July 1967	3	"If I Were a Rich Man"	Topol	9	12 July 1967	2
12 July 1967	8	"All You Need Is Love" ^{[H]}	The Beatles	1	19 July 1967	3
12 July 1967	5	"See Emily Play"	Pink Floyd	6	26 July 1967	1
12 July 1967	1	"Respect"	Aretha Franklin	10	12 July 1967	1
19 July 1967	11	"San Francisco (Be Sure to Wear Flowers in Your Hair)"	Scott McKenzie	1	9 August 1967	4
19 July 1967	1	"With a Little Help from My Friends"	The Young Idea	10	19 July 1967	1
26 July 1967	4	"Up, Up and Away" ^{[I]}	The Johnny Mann Singers	6	16 August 1967	1
26 July 1967	6	"Death of a Clown"	Dave Davies	3	2 August 1967	2
2 August 1967	9	"I'll Never Fall in Love Again"	Tom Jones	2	23 August 1967	4
2 August 1967	6	"I Was Made to Love Her"	Stevie Wonder	5	16 August 1967	1
16 August 1967	5	"Just Loving You"	Anita Harris	6	23 August 1967	1
16 August 1967	5	"Even the Bad Times Are Good"	The Tremeloes	4	23 August 1967	1
16 August 1967	4	"The House That Jack Built"	The Alan Price Set	4	30 August 1967	1
23 August 1967	1	"Creeque Alley"	The Mamas & the Papas	9	23 August 1967	1
30 August 1967	14	"The Last Waltz"	Engelbert Humperdinck	1	6 September 1967	5
30 August 1967	4	"We Love You"/"Dandelion"	The Rolling Stones	8	6 September 1967	1
6 September 1967	7	"Excerpt from A Teenage Opera"	Keith West	2	20 September 1967	2
6 September 1967	6	"Itchycoo Park"	Small Faces	3	20 September 1967	1
13 September 1967	4	"Let's Go to San Francisco"	The Flower Pot Men	4	20 September 1967	1
13 September 1967	1	"Heroes and Villains"	The Beach Boys	8	13 September 1967	1
20 September 1967	5	"Reflections"	Diana Ross & the Supremes ^{[D]}	5	27 September 1967	2
20 September 1967	7	"Flowers in the Rain"	The Move	2	4 October 1967	2
20 September 1967	7	"Hole in My Shoe"	Traffic	2	18 October 1967	1
27 September 1967	2	"The Day I Met Marie"	Cliff Richard	10	27 September 1967	2
4 October 1967	8	"Massachusetts"	Bee Gees	1	11 October 1967	4
4 October 1967	5	"The Letter"	The Box Tops	5	18 October 1967	1
11 October 1967	4	"There Must Be A Way" ^{[J]}	Frankie Vaughan	7	11 October 1967	2
11 October 1967	5	"Homburg"	Procol Harum	6	18 October 1967	1
18 October 1967	4	"From the Underworld"	The Herd	6	1 November 1967	2
25 October 1967	7	"Baby, Now That I've Found You"	The Foundations	1	8 November 1967	2
25 October 1967	5	"Zabadak!"	Dave Dee, Dozy, Beaky, Mick & Tich	3	1 November 1967	2
1 November 1967	4	"Autumn Almanac"	The Kinks	3	15 November 1967	1
8 November 1967	5	"Love Is All Around"	The Troggs	5	22 November 1967	1
8 November 1967	2	"San Franciscan Nights"	Eric Burdon & The Animals	7	15 November 1967	1
15 November 1967	2	"There Is a Mountain"	Donovan	8	15 November 1967	1
15 November 1967	7	"Let the Heartaches Begin"	Long John Baldry	1	22 November 1967	2
15 November 1967	1	"I Can See for Miles"	The Who	10	15 November 1967	1
22 November 1967	4	"Everybody Knows"	The Dave Clark Five	2	29 November 1967	2
22 November 1967	9	"If The Whole World Stopped Loving"	Val Doonican	3	29 November 1967	1
29 November 1967	6	"Something's Gotten Hold of My Heart"	Gene Pitney	5	6 December 1967	3
29 November 1967	3	"All My Love" ^{[K]}	Cliff Richard	6	27 December 1967	1
29 November 1967	9	"Hello, Goodbye"	The Beatles	1	6 December 1967	7
29 November 1967	3	"Careless Hands"	Des O'Connor	6	6 December 1967	1
6 December 1967	2	"World"	Bee Gees	9	6 December 1967	2
6 December 1967	7	"I'm Coming Home"	Tom Jones	2	20 December 1967	1
13 December 1967	3	"Here We Go Round the Mulberry Bush" ^{[L]}	Traffic	8	13 December 1967	1
13 December 1967	6	"Thank U Very Much" ♦	The Scaffold	4	3 January 1968	1
20 December 1967	6	"Magical Mystery Tour (EP)"	The Beatles	2	27 December 1967	3
20 December 1967	7	"Daydream Believer" ♦	The Monkees	5	10 January 1968	1
27 December 1967	5	"Walk Away Renée" ♦	Four Tops	3	10 January 1968	1

== Entries by artist ==
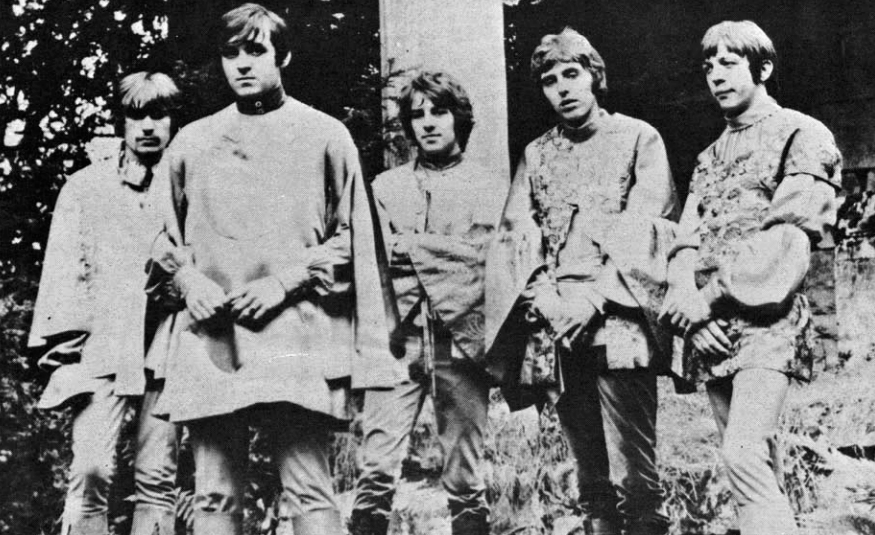
Procol Harum achieved two top 10 entries this year, including their debut single and best-known song "A Whiter Shade of Pale", which spent six weeks at number-one and became one of the defining anthems of the Summer of Love.

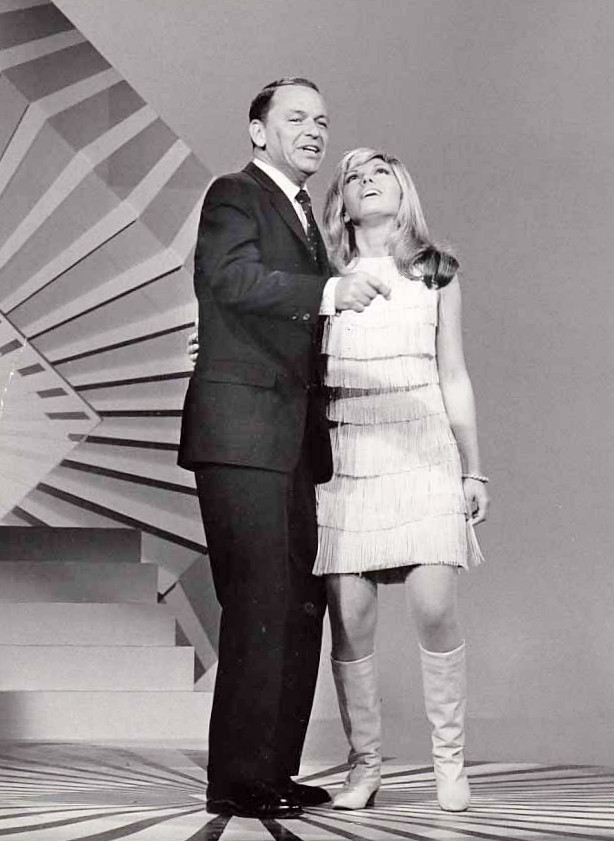
Nancy Sinatra and her father Frank Sinatra spent two weeks at number-one in April 1967 with their duet "Somethin' Stupid". Nancy had already reached the top 10 earlier in the year with "Sugar Town", which peaked at number eight.

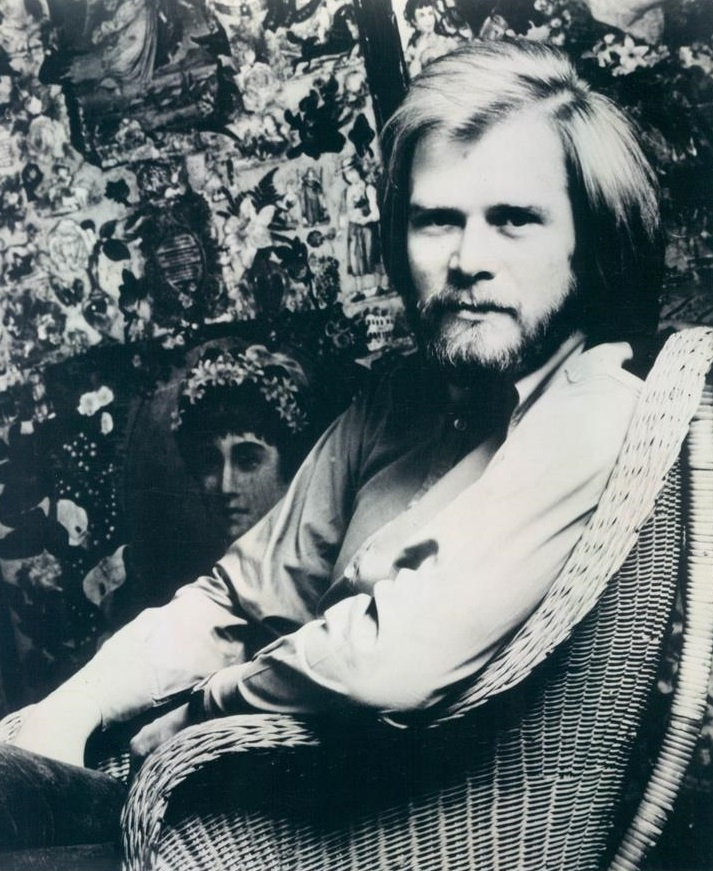
Long John Baldry secured his only UK top 10 single in November this year with "Let the Heartaches Begin", which spent two weeks at number-one.

The following table shows artists who achieved two or more top 10 entries in 1967, including singles that reached their peak in 1966 or 1968. The figures include both main artists and featured artists. The total number of weeks an artist spent in the top ten in 1967 is also shown.

Entries	Artist	Weeks	Singles
5	Tom Jones ^{[M]}	24	"Detroit City", "Funny, Familiar, Forgotten, Feelings", "Green, Green Grass of Home", "I'll Never Fall in Love Again", "I'm Coming Home"
4	The Beatles ^{[N]}	20	"All You Need Is Love", "Hello, Goodbye", "Magical Mystery Tour (EP)", "Penny Lane"/"Strawberry Fields Forever"
4	Cliff Richard	10	"All My Love", "In the Country", "It's All Over", "The Day I Met Marie"
4	Dave Davies ^{[M]}^{[O]}	19	"Autumn Almanac", "Dead End Street", "Death of a Clown", "Waterloo Sunset"
4	The Monkees ^{[N]}	22	"A Little Bit Me, A Little Bit You", "Alternate Title", "Daydream Believer", "I'm a Believer"
3	Dave Dee, Dozy, Beaky, Mick and Tich ^{[P]}	13	"Okay!", "Save Me", "Zabadak!"
3	Diana Ross & the Supremes ^{[N]}^{[Q]}	12	"Reflections", "The Happening", "You Keep Me Hangin' On"
3	Donovan ^{[P]}	9	"Mellow Yellow", "Sunshine Superman", "There Is a Mountain"
3	Engelbert Humperdinck	34	"Release Me", "There Goes My Everything", "The Last Waltz"
3	Four Tops	6	"Bernadette", "Standing in the Shadows of Love", "Walk Away Renée"
3	The Jimi Hendrix Experience	11	"Hey Joe", "Purple Haze", "The Wind Cries Mary"
3	The Kinks ^{[M]}	13	"Autumn Almanac", "Dead End Street", "Waterloo Sunset"
3	The Move	15	"Flowers in the Rain", "I Can Hear the Grass Grow", "Night of Fear"
3	Traffic	12	"Here We Go Round the Mulberry Bush", "Hole in My Shoe", "Paper Sun"
3	The Tremeloes	18	"Even the Bad Times Are Good", "Here Comes My Baby", "Silence Is Golden"
3	The Who	11	"Happy Jack", "I Can See for Miles", "Pictures of Lily"
2	The Alan Price Set	8	"Simon Smith and the Amazing Dancing Bear", "The House That Jack Built"
2	The Beach Boys	6	"Heroes and Villains", "Then I Kissed Her"
2	Bee Gees	10	"Massachusetts", "World"
2	Cat Stevens	8	"I'm Gonna Get Me a Gun", "Matthew and Son"
2	The Hollies	9	"Carrie Anne", "On a Carousel"
2	The Mamas & the Papas	9	"Creeque Alley", "Dedicated to the One I Love"
2	Nancy Sinatra	11	"Somethin' Stupid", "Sugar Town"
2	Procol Harum	15	"A Whiter Shade of Pale", "Homburg"
2	The Rolling Stones	9	"Let's Spend the Night Together"/"Ruby Tuesday", "We Love You"/"Dandelion"
2	The Seekers ^{[M]}	10	"Georgy Girl", "Morningtown Ride"
2	Small Faces ^{[M]}	7	"Itchycoo Park", "My Mind's Eye"
2	The Troggs	7	"Any Way That You Want Me", "Love Is All Around"
2	Val Doonican ^{[M]}	8	"If the Whole World Stopped Loving", "What Would I Be"

== Notes ==
- ^{a} "Daydream Believer" reached its peak of number five on 10 January 1968 (week ending).
- ^{b} "Thank U Very Much" reached its peak of number four on 3 January 1968 (week ending).
- ^{c} "My Mind's Eye" re-entered the top 10 at number 10 on 5 January 1967 (week ending).
- ^{d} The Supremes' name was altered to Diana Ross & The Supremes in 1967.
- ^{e} "What Becomes of the Brokenhearted" re-entered the top 10 at number 8 on 4 January 1967 (week ending).
- ^{f} "Puppet on a String" was the United Kingdom's winning entry at the Eurovision Song Contest in 1967.
- ^{g} "Alternate Title" was originally known as "Randy Scouse Git" but The Monkees' record label (RCA) asked for it to be changed. "Randy Scouse Git" was a reference from the sitcom Till Death Us Do Part.
- ^{h} "All You Need Is Love" was used as the UK's contribution to the first live global television programme, Our World. For the show it was performed over a pre-recorded backing track.
- ^{i} "Up, Up and Away" re-entered the top 10 at number 8 on 9 August 1967 (week ending) for 3 weeks.
- ^{j} "There Must Be a Way" re-entered the top 10 at number 10 on 8 November 1967 (week ending).
- ^{k} "All My Love" re-entered the top 10 at number 7 on 19 December 1967 (week ending) for 2 weeks.
- ^{l} "Here We Go Round the Mulberry Bush" re-entered the top 10 at number 10 on 10 January 1968 (week ending).
- ^{m} Figure includes single that peaked in 1966.
- ^{n} Figure includes single that peaked in 1968.
- ^{o} Figure includes three top 10 hits with the group The Kinks.
- ^{p} Figure includes single that first charted in 1966 but peaked in 1967.
- ^{q} Two of Diana Ross & the Supremes entries were recorded under their old name The Supremes.

== See also ==
- 1967 in British music
- List of number-one singles from the 1960s (UK)
