= I'll Never Fall in Love Again (Lonnie Donegan song) =

1962 single by Lonnie Donegan

Single by Lonnie Donegan
- B-side: "Keep on the Sunny Side"
- Released: 1962
- Label: Pye
- Songwriters: Traditional (music), Jimmy Currie, Lonnie Donegan

Official audio
- "I'll Never Fall in Love Again" on YouTube

"I'll Never Fall in Love Again" is a song written by Lonnie Donegan and Jimmy Currie, and first released by Donegan as a single in 1962.

== Composition ==
The verses are melodically based on the traditional folk song "Wanderin", even recycling the "It looks like" phrase. The Italian-styled chorus, however, sounds very different.

== Tom Jones version ==
"I'll Never Fall in Love Again"

Single by Tom Jones

from the album 13 Smash Hits
- B-side: "Things I Wanna Do"
- Released: July 1967
- Genre: Deep soul
- Length: 4:14 (7" full); 2:55 (7" edit)
- Label: Decca
- Composer: Traditional
- Lyricists: Jimmy Currie, Lonnie Donegan
- Producer: Peter Sullivan

Tom Jones singles chronology
"Funny Familiar Forgotten Feelings" (1967)	"I'll Never Fall in Love Again" (1967)	"I'm Coming Home" (1967)

The most commercially successful recording of the song was by Tom Jones in 1967. Upon its first release, Jones' recording reached number 2 on the UK Singles Chart but was less successful in the United States where it peaked at number 49 on the Hot 100, and number 28 on the Adult Contemporary chart.

As the follow-up to Jones' "Love Me Tonight", "I'll Never Fall in Love Again" was reissued in 1969 in the US, reaching number six on the Hot 100 and number one on the Adult Contemporary chart.

=== Certifications ===
Region	Certification	Certified units/sales
United Kingdom (BPI)	Silver	200,000^{‡}
^{‡} Sales+streaming figures based on certification alone.

== Other versions ==
In 1968, "Plus jamais", a French version of the song was recorded by the Belgian singer Liliane Saint-Pierre. The song reached No. 44 on the Ultratop chart in Belgium.

It was also recorded by Timi Yuro on her 1968 album Something Bad on My Mind, Lena Martell, Charlie Hodges, Richard Marx (B-side to "The Way She Loves Me"), and Marco T.

Jones' version was covered in 1978 by Filipino Tom Jones impersonator Sam Sorono on his Sings Tom Jones' Greatest Hits album on EMI Records.

The song was also covered by Elvis Presley on the album From Elvis Presley Boulevard, Memphis, Tennessee in 1976.

In 2019, Donegan's son, Peter auditioned for The Voice UK in which Tom Jones turned his chair for him. Jones, when finding out and taken aback by who he was, performed an impromptu duet of the song with Peter.

== See also ==
- List of number-one adult contemporary singles of 1969 (U.S.)
