= Delilah (Tom Jones song) =

Single by Tom Jones

from the album Delilah
- B-side: "Smile"
- Released: February 1968
- Recorded: 20 December 1967
- Studio: Decca, London
- Genre: Pop, murder ballad
- Length: 3:20
- Label: Decca (UK/Ireland); Parrot (North America)
- Songwriters: Les Reed; Barry Mason
- Producer: Peter Sullivan

Tom Jones singles chronology
"I'm Coming Home" (1967)	"Delilah" (1968)	"Help Yourself" (1968)

"Delilah" is a song recorded by Welsh singer Tom Jones in December 1967. The lyrics were written by Barry Mason, and the music by Les Reed, who also contributed the title and theme of the song. It earned Reed and Mason the 1968 Ivor Novello award for Best Song Musically and Lyrically.

== Music and lyrics ==
The song, written in 6/8 time, begins characteristically with percussive Am^{9} (A4–B4–C5–E5) eighth notes played on the xylophone and high strings. The dramatically orchestrated verses are written in A minor (including an explosive A major secondary dominant on ‘She was my woman’). As the song moves into the chorus, the drama gives way to a simple melodic line using the triad notes of C major (E4–C4–G4). The chorus is accompanied by a distinctive two-part trumpet figure written in thirds.

The song tells the story, with details largely unstated, of a man passing his girlfriend's home after dark, who recognises that shadows at her window are of her having sex with another man.

He is waiting across the street when her lover leaves at dawn. He then confronts her, only to have her laugh in his face. He stabs and kills her, then waits for others (probably the police) "to come to break down the door". The lyrics unfold from his point of view, and are filled with his, often contradictory, emotions. He speaks of Delilah in possessive terms, but also refers to himself as her "slave." He asks her to "forgive" him, presumably in death, but still clearly sees himself as having been wronged by her.

When Jones performed the song on The Ed Sullivan Show in 1968, the censors (unsuccessfully) attempted to insist that the line "At break of day when the man drove away" be changed to "At break of day I was still 'cross the way", as the original version implied that the other man had spent the night with Delilah. Jones later described the proposed change as "such bullshit".

In a two-year court case in the High Court of Justice, 1983 -M- No.1566, Barry Mason's ex-wife Sylvan Whittingham, the daughter of Thunderball screenwriter Jack Whittingham, claimed she had written half the lyrics of "Delilah" and several other songs. The legal battle was settled out of court in 1986.

== Chart performance ==
Tom Jones' recording reached No. 1 in the charts of several countries, including Germany and Switzerland. It reached No 2 in the British charts in March 1968 and was the sixth-best selling single of that year. The US Billboard chart records its highest position as 15.

== Charts ==
=== Weekly charts ===
Chart (1968)	Peak position
Australia (Go-Set)	3
Austria (Ö3 Austria Top 40)	3
Belgium (Ultratop 50 Flanders)	1
Canada (RPM)	5
Finland (Suomen virallinen lista)	1
French Singles Chart	1
Ireland (IRMA)	1
Italian Singles Chart (Musica e Dischi)	11
Netherlands (Dutch Top 40)	2
Netherlands (Single Top 100)	1
New Zealand (Listener)	2
Norway (VG-lista)	2
Singapore Singles Chart	6
South Africa (Springbok Radio)	1
Spain (AFYVE)	2
Sweden (Kvällstoppen)	2
Switzerland (Schweizer Hitparade)	1
UK Melody Maker	1
UK Singles (Official Charts)	2
US Billboard Hot 100	15
West Germany (GfK)	1

=== Year-end charts ===
Chart (1968)	Rank
Switzerland	5
UK	4
US Billboard Hot 100	66

== Certifications and sales ==
Region	Certification	Certified units/sales
Germany	—	200,000
New Zealand (RMNZ)	Gold	15,000^{‡}
Spain	—	300,000
United Kingdom 1968 physical sales	—	500,000
United Kingdom (BPI) sales since 2006	Silver	200,000^{‡}
Yugoslavia	—	200,000
Summaries
Worldwide	—	5,000,000
^{‡} Sales+streaming figures based on certification alone.

== Sensational Alex Harvey Band cover ==
In 1975, Scottish rock band The Sensational Alex Harvey Band released a live version of the song, edited from their album Live. It peaked at number 7 in the UK chart, becoming the band's biggest hit.

== Use in Welsh rugby ==
Shortly after its release, "Delilah" became an unofficial anthem in Welsh rugby. As early as 1971, Max Boyce's own hit song, Hymns and Arias referenced "Delilah"'s popularity alongside more traditional Welsh hymns:

"We sang Cwm Rhondda and Delilah; damn, they sounded both the same".

The song's popularity saw it become part of official matchday performances at Wales matches, especially those at the old National Stadium. On 17 April 1999, Jones performed Delilah as part of the pre-match build-up to Wales' victory over England at Wembley Stadium in the 1999 Five Nations Championship.

=== Controversy ===
The Welsh Rugby Union regularly played the song at the Millennium Stadium before international matches, often displaying the lyrics on large screens. On 20 June 2003, Senedd Member Helen Mary Jones publicly raised concerns that the song "glorifies violence against women". The song's co-writer, Barry Mason, responded to Jones' criticism, stating: "It's sad, isn't it? She's being silly. To say fans are wrong to sing Delilah insults their intelligence. Nobody listens to the lyrics." The Welsh Rugby Union replied that their use of the song was in response to public demand, adding: "Fans sing this song without concern for the lyrics."

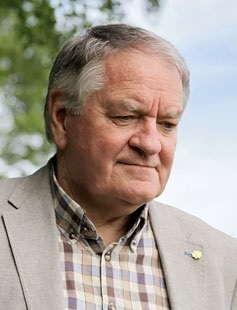
Politician and folk singer Dafydd Iwan; his article started a national debate on the use of the song in rugby.

Further criticism of the song's use in Welsh rugby came in 2014, when politician and singer Dafydd Iwan wrote an article on the meaning of song lyrics. Iwan noted that choirs and fans inside the stadium would sing Delilah alongside his own folk song, "Yma o Hyd", and the Christian hymns "Cwm Rhondda" and "Calon Lân". Iwan stated that while each song was "great to sing", the four together formed a strange mix. Iwan's article stated that while he had written "Yma o Hyd" about the historic survival of the Welsh nation against the odds, Delilah was "a song about murder and it does tend to trivialise the idea of murdering a woman and it's a pity these words now have been elevated to the status of a secondary national anthem. I think we should rummage around for another song instead of 'Delilah'".

Iwan's article led to much debate across the UK, with The Guardian erroneously reporting that Iwan had called for the song to be banned. In a BBC interview, Tom Jones responded to the debate by saying that the song was "not a political statement" and that "I love to hear it being sung at Welsh games, it makes me very proud to be Welsh that they're using one of my songs." The Welsh Rugby Union also responded that they had condemned "violence against women" and had "taken a lead role in police campaigns to highlight and combat the issue." However, a spokesman added that the WRU was "willing to listen to any strong public debate on the issue of censoring the use of Delilah". Comparisons were made to similar themes in other well-known tragedies, such as Romeo and Juliet which had not been deemed controversial. Following these responses, Iwan wrote a letter to the Guardian pointing out their error, adding that "banning songs is not something I would ever advocate."

=== Response ===
In 2015, the Welsh Rugby Union removed the song from its half-time entertainment and playlist for international matches. The Union again clarified their position on 1 February 2023, prior to the start of the 2023 Six Nations Championship. The Union reiterated that "Delilah" was no longer included in playlists for Wales matches and that guest choirs had also been requested not to feature the song in more recent years. This announcement was immediately criticised by some, including Wales wing Louis Rees-Zammit, who tweeted: "All the things they need to do and they do that first…" The statement was seen by some as a response to allegations of a "toxic culture" within the WRU, raised in a BBC Wales documentary. Richard Marx performed the song live in Cardiff the following evening. Marx opened his performance of the song by stating that "I am not remotely minimising violence, or especially violence against women, but there are a lot of things that we all could be doing to help the situation, other than banning Delilah."

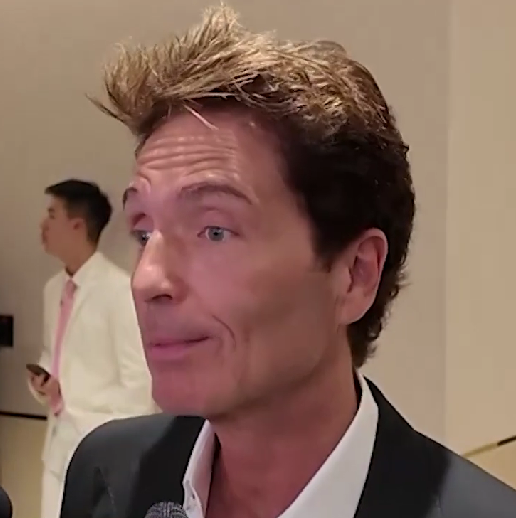
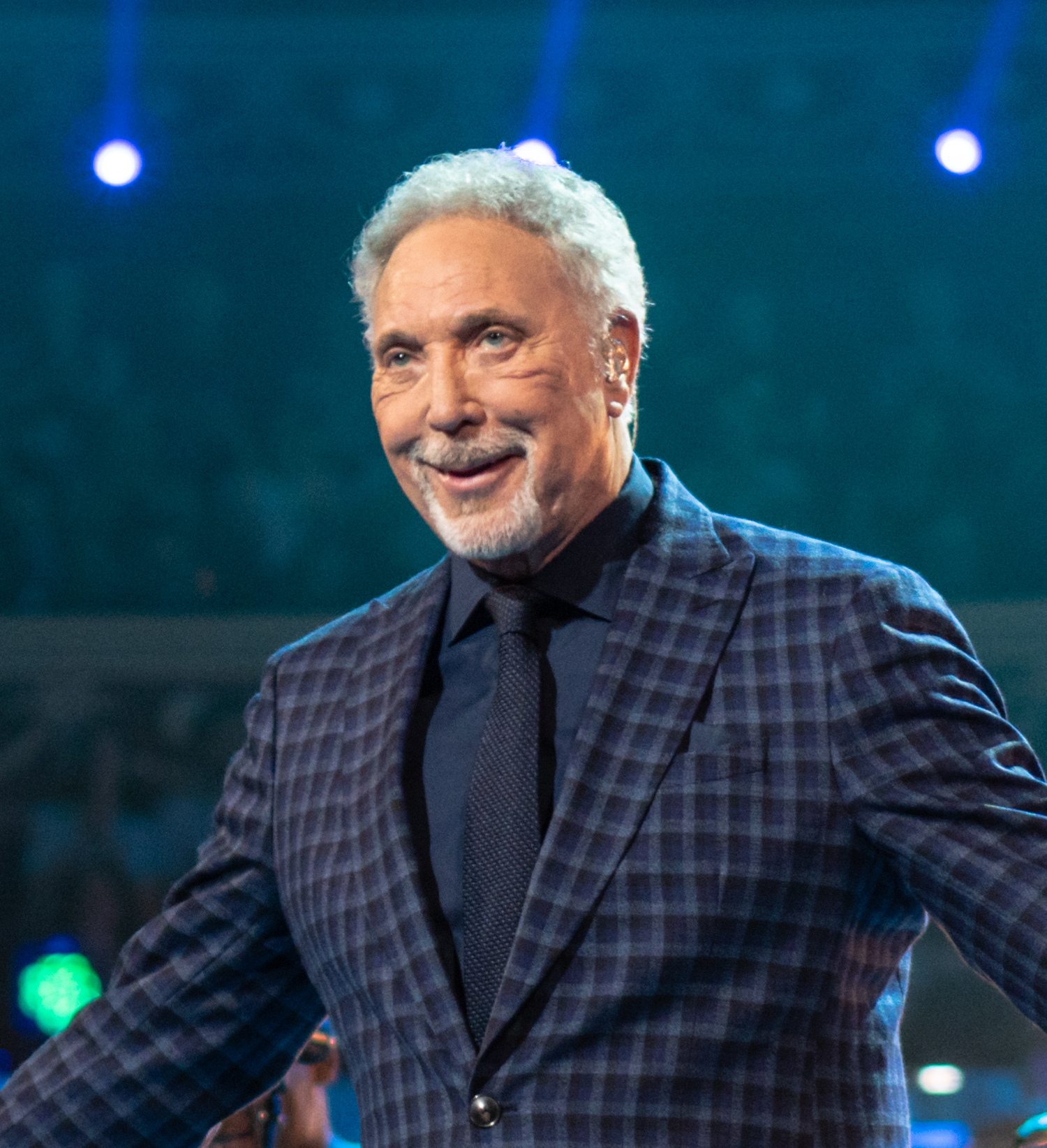
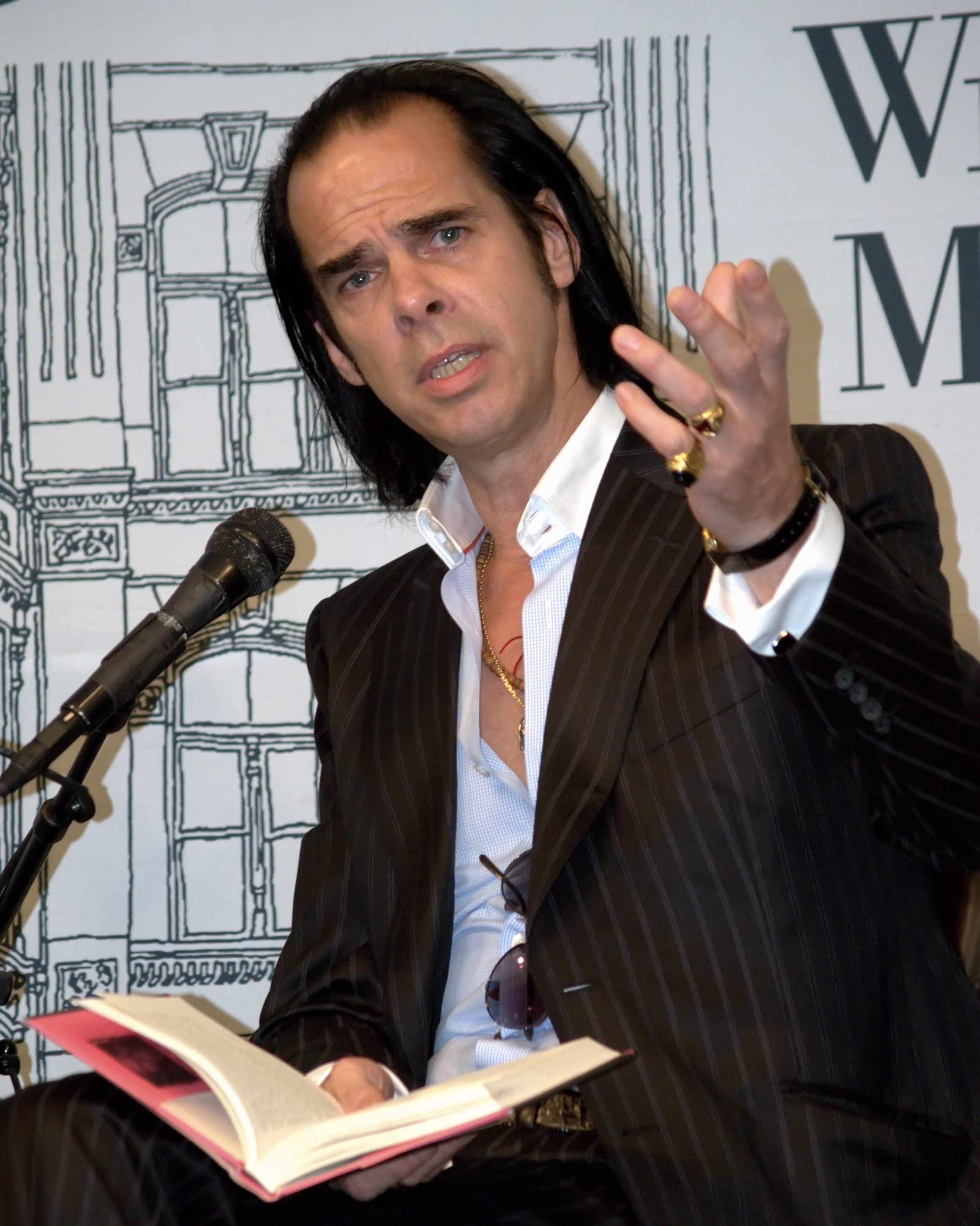
Richard Marx and Tom Jones both defended the song, before performing it in Wales during the 2023 controversy. Nick Cave said the song was unworthy of the privilege of being banned.

The Welsh Rugby Union's actions were commended by the Chief Constable of Dyfed–Powys Police, while singer Nick Cave stated: "I can't get too animated by the fact that Delilah has been banned. I understand there is a principle here, but on some level I like the fact that some songs are controversial enough to be outlawed. It fills me with a kind of professional pride to be a part of the sometimes contentious business of songwriting. It's cool. I just wish it was a more worthy song to be awarded that greatest of honours, indeed that supreme privilege, of being banned." After watching an online video of a Welsh male voice choir singing the song, Cave added "I'm sorry to report that listening to this version of the song did make me feel like murdering someone, primarily the Welsh male choir. Or maybe it wasn't the choir, but the song itself that disturbed me – I just don’t like it."

In February 2023, domestic abuse campaigner Rachel Williams told BBC News that educating the masses on violence against women is better than banning Delilah and other similar pieces such as Carmen, Pagliacci, and William Shakespeare's Othello.

In July 2023 Jones performed the song as part of three concerts held at Cardiff Castle. In the first show, Jones addressed the crowd with an apparent approval of the WRUs stance: "Who was the man who didn’t want us to sing Delilah? You can’t stop us singing Delilah. He stopped the choir from singing but he didn’t stop the crowd from singing it. And we will keep singing it too!" This was greeted with cheers from the crowd before Jones' rendition of the song.

== Other uses ==
=== Sport ===
Supporters of Stoke City adopted "Delilah" as their club anthem. The origins are disputed with one version dating it precisely to an away game at Derby on 11 April 1987. Others claim it was sung by Stoke City fans as early as the mid 1970s. Some of the song's original lyrics were adapted for the football terraces, but the essence of the song remained the same. Snooker World Champion Mark Williams uses "Delilah" as his walk-on music.

=== Film ===
The song featured in the 1990 film Edward Scissorhands.

It was featured in 'American Hustle' during a social gathering with Christian Bale and Jeremy Renner's character sang along with it.

=== Music ===
On 4 June 2012 Jones performed the song for the Queen's Diamond Jubilee Concert.
