= I'm Coming Home (Tom Jones song) =

Single by Tom Jones
- B-side: "The Lonely One"
- Released: 1967
- Genre: Pop
- Length: 2:51
- Label: Decca
- Songwriters: John Barry Mason; Les Reed
- Producer: Peter Sullivan

Tom Jones singles chronology
"I'll Never Fall in Love Again" (1967)	"I'm Coming Home" (1967)	"Delilah" (1968)

"I'm Coming Home" is a popular song written by British musicians John Barry Mason and Les Reed. Released in 1967 as a single by Welsh musician Tom Jones, the song was an international hit, reaching the top position on the Belgium record charts, number two in the United Kingdom, sixth place on the Dutch charts, and peaking at number 10 in Ireland.

== Charts ==
Chart (1967)	Peak position
UK Singles Chart	2
Austria (Ö3 Austria Top 40)	16
Belgium – Flanders (Ultratop)	1
Germany (GfK Entertainment charts)	39
Irish Singles Chart	10
Netherlands (MegaCharts)	6
New Zealand (Listener)	8
US Billboard Hot 100	57
