= Help Yourself (Tom Jones song) =

1968 Tom Jones single

Single by Tom Jones

from the album Help Yourself
- B-side: "Day By Day" (Mills)
- Released: July 1968
- Recorded: 1968
- Genre: Pop
- Length: 2:53
- Label: Decca F 12812 (UK); Parrot (US)
- Songwriters: Carlo Donida, Jack Fishman
- Producer: Peter Sullivan

Tom Jones singles chronology
"Delilah" (1968)	"Help Yourself" (1968)	"A Minute of Your Time" (1968)

Official audio
- "Help Yourself" on YouTube

"Help Yourself" is a song recorded by Welsh singer Tom Jones in 1968. The song is one of Jones' best known songs and reached number five in the UK Singles Chart in its original run. It topped the charts in both Ireland and Germany, and spent three weeks at the top spot in Australia. The American single reached Billboard peaks of number 35 pop and number three easy listening, and is still widely played on adult-standards radio.

== Chart performance ==
=== Weekly charts ===
Chart (1968)	Peak position
Australia (Go-Set)	1
Canada RPM Top Singles	34
Ireland (IRMA)	1
Netherlands	7
New Zealand (Listener)	3
South Africa (Springbok)	1
United Kingdom (Record Retailer)	5
United Kingdom (NME)	1
United States (Billboard Hot 100)	35
United States (Billboard Easy Listening)	3
United States (Cash Box) Top 100	32
West Germany (GfK)	1

=== Year-end charts ===
Chart (1968)	Position
Australia	17
South Africa	7
UK	25
US (Billboard Easy Listening)	23

== Original song ==
"Gli Occhi Miei"

Single by Dino
- B-side: "Passano"
- Released: 1968
- Length: 2:30
- Label: Arc Records
- Songwriters: Carlo Donida, Mogol

"Help Yourself" is a reworked English-language version of the Italian song "Gli Occhi Miei" ("My Eyes"), which was written by Carlo Donida with lyrics by Mogol and originally performed by both Dino (Eugenio Zambelli) and Wilma Goich at the 1968 Sanremo Music Festival. British author and songwriter Jack Fishman (a.k.a. Larry Khan) wrote the English lyrics, which bear no relation to the original Italian.

== Tony Ferrino version ==
The song was recorded by comedian Steve Coogan in character as Tony Ferrino. The track was used in the TV show The Tony Ferrino Phenomenon, included on an album and released as a single in November 1996, reaching #42 in the UK singles chart.

== Other cover versions ==
- In 1968, Nora Aunor (a Filipino Superstar) released an English-language version on the album More, More, More of Nora Aunor which became a big hit in that same year in the Philippines
- In 1968, Austrian singer Peter Alexander released a German language version called "Komm' und bedien' Dich bei mir", which reached no. 9 on the German charts.
- Les Compagnons de la chanson released a French version titled "Ce bonheur-là", which reached No. 48 on the Belgian chart in 1968.
- The song is performed, by Tom Jones and Will Ferrell, in the 2004 movie Anchorman.
