= Please Don't Go (Donald Peers song) =

Single by Donald Peers
- B-side: "I've Lost My Love"
- Released: 1968
- Genre: Pop
- Label: Columbia
- Songwriters: Les Reed; Jackie Rae

"Please Don't Go" is a popular song written by Les Reed and Jackie Rae, and recorded by the Welsh singer Donald Peers. The melody of the song was adapted from a classical piece, "Barcarolle" from the opera The Tales of Hoffmann by Offenbach.

It was the first top 10 UK Singles Chart (compiled since 1952) entry for Peers, an old-style singer popular in the 1940s. It entered the UK Singles Chart on 24 December 1968, reaching number three on 11 March 1969.

Eddy Arnold had a 1969 top-ten country hit with the song in the United States.

== Charts ==
Chart (1969)	Peak position
Ireland (IRMA)	3
UK Singles (OCC)	3
