= Peter Sullivan (music producer) =

British record producer

Peter Michael Sullivan (28 September 1933 – 17 November 2020) was a British record producer, active mostly during the 1960s, and most often associated with records by Tom Jones and Engelbert Humperdinck.

== Biography ==
By the late 1950s, Sullivan was working at the His Master's Voice record label as assistant to producer Wally Ridley. Ridley allowed Sullivan to take charge of recording sessions by a rock and roll group, Johnny Kidd and the Pirates, in 1960, and, working with engineer Malcolm Addey, Sullivan produced "Shakin' All Over", which became a hit single in the UK.

Sullivan left HMV in 1962 and joined Decca Records as a producer. There, he produced records by Kathy Kirby, Lee Curtis and the All-Stars, and Bern Elliott and the Fenmen, before discovering Scottish singer Lulu and producing her debut hit "Shout".

Although the details of their first contact are disputed, Sullivan was also one of the first to recognise the recording potential of Welsh singer Tom Jones, then known as Tommy Scott. In late 1964, Sullivan produced Tom Jones' single, "It's Not Unusual", insisting that a brass section be used in the arrangement. The song became a number one hit on the UK Singles Chart in March 1965, launching Jones' career. Sullivan continued to produce Tom Jones' records in the 1960s, including "What's New Pussycat?", "Green, Green Grass of Home", and "Delilah". He also produced the UK number one hit by Engelbert Humperdinck, "The Last Waltz", and records by Solomon King, Jim Capaldi, and Demis Roussos, among others.

In 1965, together with George Martin, Ron Richards and John Burgess of EMI, Sullivan helped set up Associated Independent Recording (AIR), one of the earliest independent record production companies. George Martin commented in 1971: "I know I could not make records as well as Peter Sullivan in his particular field–every one of Tom Jones and Engelbert Humperdinck’s records required a special skill that he had. Equally, I know he could not have coped with the Beatles. We are complementary. We give each other something the other lacks and needs and, most important of all, we like each other."

Sullivan later lived and worked as a music consultant and record producer in Nashville, Tennessee.

He died in November 2020 from leukaemia, at the age of 87.
