= Do What You Gotta Do (Jimmy Webb song) =

New Zealand musical composition

"Do What You Gotta Do" is a song that was written by Jimmy Webb. It was first recorded by Johnny Rivers and released on his 1967 album Rewind. In 1968, it was an R&B hit for Al Wilson. It was also a hit for Nina Simone that year and a local hit for New Zealand band Larry's Rebels.

== Al Wilson version ==
=== "Do What You Gotta Do" ===
"Do What You Gotta Do"

Single by Al Wilson
- A-side: "Do What You Gotta Do"
- B-side: "Now I Know What Love Is"
- Released: December 1967
- Genre: Soul, pop
- Length: 3:20
- Label: Soul City SCR-761
- Songwriter: Jimmy Webb
- Producer: Johnny Rivers

Al Wilson singles chronology
"The Snake" (1973)	"Do What You Gotta Do" (1967)	"I Stand Accused" (1974)

Al Wilson's version was released as a single in December 1967. It was produced by Marc Gordon and arranged by Marty Paich. For the week ending Jan 6, 1968, the single was bubbling under the Billboard Hot 100 at No. 127. By February 10, 1968, it was bubbling under at 103. The following week it had only moved up one place to 102, but at the same time, it was at No. 46 in the R&B chart. It peaked at No. 39 on March 9, 1968, and spent a total of 6 weeks on the R&B chart. In Canada it reached No. 85, March 30, 1968.

=== "Now I Know What Love Is" ===
The B-side to "Do What You Gotta Do" was the composition by Willie Hutch, "Now I Know What Love Is". It was produced by Marc Gordon. It was one of a number of songs that Hutch wrote for Wilson, which included "Who Could Be Lovin' You" and "Getting Ready for Tomorrow". Hutch was also a Soul City label-mate of Wilson. It would eventually become a Northern soul hit and enduring favorite on the scene, possibly influencing some record sellers to list the record in auctions with "Now I Know What Love Is" as the A-side instead of its proper allocation as the B-side. It would appear on compilations such as Northern Soul from the City, released in 2004, and the Kev Roberts compiled Mastercuts Northern Soul, released in 2005.

== Nina Simone version ==
"Do What You Gotta Do"

Single by Nina Simone
- A-side: "Do What You Gotta Do"
- B-side: "Peace of Mind"
- Released: 1968
- Label: RCA Victor 47-9602
- Songwriter: Jimmy Webb
- Producers: Stroud Productions, Inc.

Nina Simone singles chronology
"Why? (The King of Love Is Dead) - Pt. 1" (1968)	"Do What You Gotta Do" (1968)	"Ain't Got No; I Got Life" (1968)

Nina Simone's version was released in August 1968. The credited producer was Stroud Productions and Enterprises, Inc., and it was arranged and conducted by Horace Ott. It spent 5 weeks in the Billboard Hot 100 and peaked at No. 83 on October 26, 1968. It was released double-sided together with "Ain't Got No, I Got Life" in the UK and reached No. 2 on the chart.

=== Charts ===
Chart (1968)	Peak position
UK Singles (Official Charts)	2
US Billboard Hot 100	83
US Hot R&B/Hip-Hop Songs (Billboard)	43

== Larry's Rebels version ==
"Do What You Gotta Do"

Single by Larry's Rebels
- A-side: "Do What You Gotta Do"
- Released: 1968
- Label: Impact IR-1039
- Songwriter: Jimmy Webb

Larry's Rebels singles chronology
"Halloween"	"Do What You Gotta Do"	"Party Time"

Larry's Rebels released a version on the New Zealand Impact label in September 1968 backed with "Looking for a Way" which was composed by John Williams and Larry Morris.

The song was recorded during the group's Blast Off '68 tour. Their guitar and organ player Terry Rouse couldn't make the session so Brian Henderson played organ on the recording.

By October 4, 1968, the single had moved from No. 11 to No. 10 on the NZ listener charts. It eventually peaked at No. 6. Billboard also recorded its entry into the NZ top 10 at No. 10 for October 19, 1968.

== Other versions ==
It has also been recorded by Bobby Vee, Clarence Carter, Paul Anka, and Ronnie Milsap. All were released in 1968, and Bobby Vee's version reached No. 62 in Canada. Glen Campbell and The Fifth Dimension have also recorded it. The Four Tops released a version in 1969 which was available as a single in the UK and reached #11 on the pop chart. It was also included on their album Four Tops Now!. Both B.J. Thomas and Roberta Flack had versions released in 1970 and the following year a version by Tom Jones was released. A version appeared on the Cher and Gregg Allman duet album Two the Hard Way. Linda Ronstadt had a version in 1993. Okkervil River released a version in 2007 on their free downloadable album Golden Opportunities Mixtape. Kanye West sampled Nina Simone's recording on his 2016 album The Life of Pablo, in the controversial track "Famous," with the lyrics being sung/interpolated by Rihanna.

Webb recorded and released his own version of the song on Just Across the River (2010).
