= Engelbert Humperdinck discography =

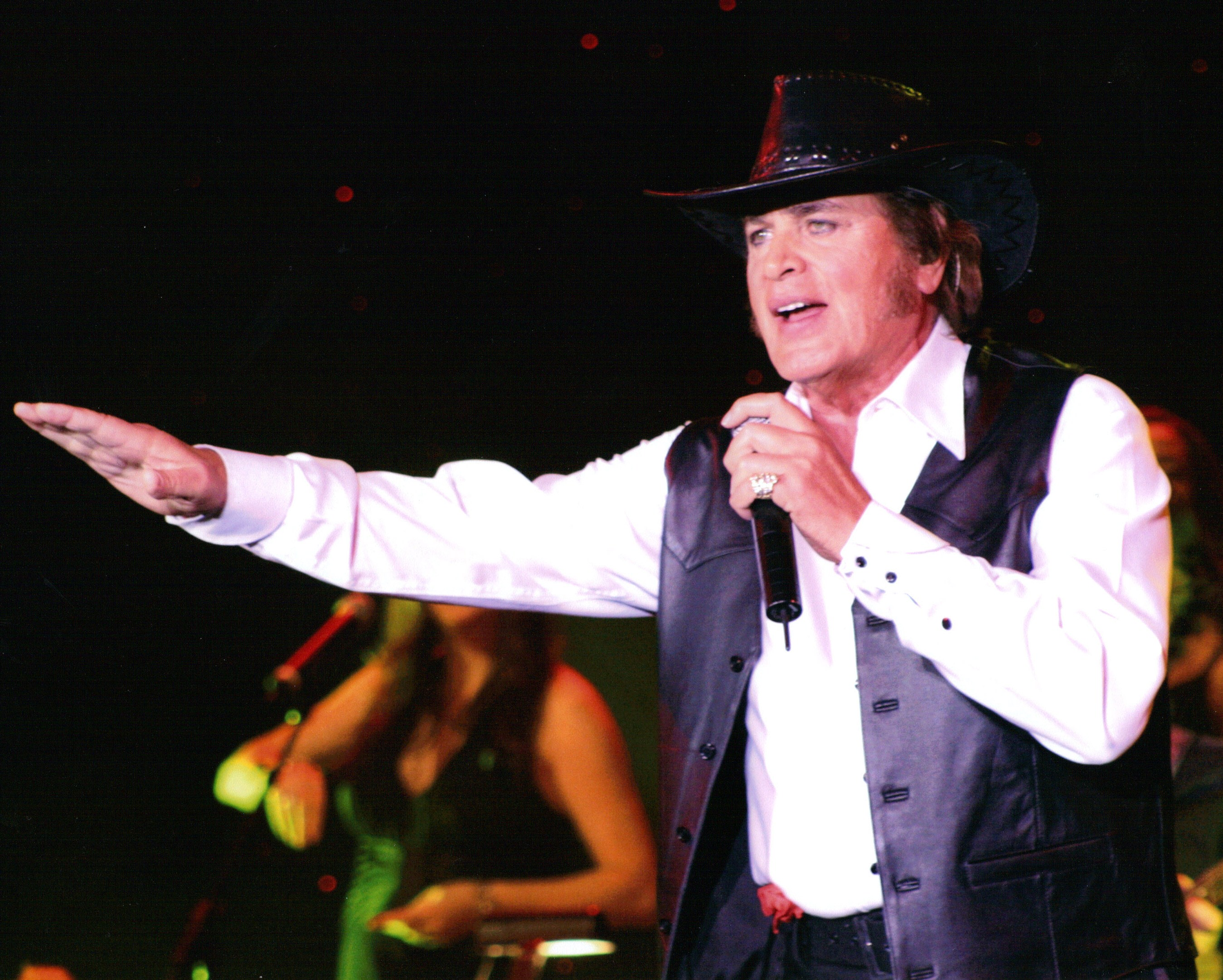
Humperdinck in 2008

This is the discography of the British singer Engelbert Humperdinck who began recording in 1959 as Gerry Dorsey, but had his first international breakthrough hit in 1967 with the stage name Engelbert Humperdinck.

== Albums ==
=== Studio albums ===
| Album | Details | Peak chart position | | | | |
| Album | Details | US | UK | AUS | GER | NZ |
|---|---|---|---|---|---|---|
| Release Me | Released: May 1967; Label: Decca (SKL 4468) | 7 | 6 | — | — | — |
| The Last Waltz | Released: November 1967; Label: Decca (SKL 4901) | 10 | 3 | — | — | — |
| A Man Without Love | Released: July 1968; Label: Decca (SKL 4939) | 12 | 3 | 10 | 9 | — |
| Engelbert | Released: February 1969; Label: Decca (SKL 4985) | 12 | 3 | — | — | — |
| Engelbert Humperdinck | Released: November 1969; Label: Decca (SKL 5030) | 5 | 5 | 8 | — | — |
| We Made It Happen | Released: July 1970; Label: Decca (SKL 5054) | 19 | 17 | 20 | — | — |
| Sweetheart | Released: February 1971; Label: Decca (SKL 5078) | 22 | — | — | — | — |
| Another Time, Another Place | Released: September 1971; Label: Decca (SKL 5097) | 25 | 48 | — | — | — |
| In Time | Released: August 1972; Label: Decca (SKL 5138) | 72 | — | — | — | — |
| King of Hearts | Released: July 1973; Label: Decca (SKL 5163) | 113 | — | — | — | — |
| My Love | Released: November 1973; Label: Decca (SKL 5181) | — | — | 90 | — | — |
| After the Lovin' | Released: November 1976; Label: EMI (EMC 3165) / Epic (PE 34381) | 17 | — | 54 | — | 24 |
| Miracles | Released: July 1977; Label: EMI (EMC 3272) / Epic (PE 34730) | 167 | — | — | — | — |
| Christmas Tyme | Released: November 1977; Label: EMI (EMC 3218) / Epic (PE 35031) | 156 | — | — | — | — |
| Last of the Romantics | Released: 1978; Label: EMI (EMC 3257) / Epic (JE 35020) | — | — | — | — | — |
| This Moment in Time | Released: May 1979; Label: EMI / Epic (JE 35791) | 164 | — | — | — | — |
| Love's Only Love | Released: 1980; Label: Epic (JE 36431) | — | — | — | — | — |
| A Merry Christmas with Engelbert Humperdinck | Released: 1980; Label: Epic (JE 36765) | — | — | — | — | — |
| Don't You Love Me Anymore? | Released: 1981; Label: Epic (FE 37128) | — | — | — | — | — |
| You And Your Lover | Released: 1983; Label: Epic (FE 38087) | — | — | — | — | — |
| A Lovely Way to Spend an Evening | Released: March 1985; Label: Silver Eagle (SE 1034) / Polytel (PTL-2-7009) / J&B (JB203); Note: Double Album | — | — | 28 | — | — |
| Träumen mit Engelbert / With Love | Released: November 1986; Label: Ariola (207 865) | — | — | — | 1 | — |
| In Liebe / Natural Love | Released: October 1988; Label: White / Ariola (259 312) | — | — | — | 2 | — |
| Ich Denk an Dich / Step into My Life | Released: December 1989; Label: White / Ariola (260 344) | — | — | — | 20 | — |
| Zärtlichkeiten | Released: 1990; Label: White / Ariola (261 079) | — | — | — | 49 | — |
| Träumen mit Engelbert 2 | Released: 1991; Label: Ariola (211 987) | — | — | — | — | — |
| Hello Out There (with the Royal Philharmonic Orchestra) | Released: 1992; Label: Polydor (517 232-2) | — | — | — | — | — |
| Yours / Quiereme Mucho | Released: 1993; Label: Polydor (521 142-2) | — | — | — | — | — |
| Christmas Eve (with James Last) | Released: 1994; Label: Polydor (521 015-2) | — | — | —N/a | — | — |
| Love Unchained | Released: 1995; Label: CORE (9457-2) / EMI (CDEMTV94) | — | 16 | — | — | 22 |
| After Dark | Released: 1996; Label: CORE (488779466-2) | — | — | — | — | — |
| The Dance Album | Released: March 1999; Label: Interhit Records (P2 51094) / WEA (PS251094) | — | — | 86 | — | 37 |
| Definition of Love | Released: January 2003; Label: Label: Hip-O Records (440 066 113-2) | — | — | — | — | — |
| Always Hear the Harmony: The Gospel Sessions | Released: 2003; Label: Art Greenhaw Records (AG 2023) | — | — | — | — | — |
| Let There Be Love | Released: February 2005; Label: Decca (4756606) | — | 67 | — | — | — |
| The Winding Road | Released: 2007; Label: Golden Tunes Records (GTR 0071 2) | — | — | — | — | — |
| Released | Released: November 2010; Label: Universal (2755800); Note: Australia Only | —N/a | —N/a | 91 | —N/a | —N/a |
| Engelbert Calling | Released: March 2014; Label: Conehead UK (CONE44) / OK! Good Records (OK 90130-2); Note: Double Album | — | 31 | 22 | — | 8 |
| Runaway Country | Released: 2015; Label: Spin | — | — | — | — | — |
| The Man I Want to Be | Released: November 2017; Label: OK! Good Records (OK 90154-2) | — | — | — | — | — |
| Warmest Christmas Wishes | Released: October 2018; Label: OK! Good Records (OK 90158-2) | — | — | — | — | — |
| All About Love | Released: May 2023; Label: OK! Good Records (OK 90206-2) | — | — | — | — | — |
| Faithfully | Released: August 2026; Label: Cleopatra Records | — | — | — | — | — |

=== Live albums ===
| Album | Details | Peak chart position | | | | |
| Album | Details | US | UK | AUS | GER | NZ |
|---|---|---|---|---|---|---|
| Live at the Riviera, Las Vegas | Released: December 1971; Label: Decca (TXS 105) | 45 | 45 | — | — | — |
| Live in Japan | Released: 1975; Label: EMI (EFS-67139.40) / London Records (GSW 509/10); Note: Recorded in February 1975 | — | — | — | — | — |
| All of Me / Live in Concert | Released: 1980; Label: Epic (E2X 36782); Note: Double Album | — | — | — | — | — |
| Live / The Best Of (Live at the Royal Albert Hall) | Released: 1998; Label: Prism Leisure Corporation (PLATCD 299) | — | — | — | — | — |
| Engelbert Humperdinck Live | Released: July 2003; Label: Eagle Records (EAGCD262) | — | — | — | — | — |
| Totally Amazing | Released: 2006; Label: Image Entertainment | — | — | — | — | — |

=== Charted compilation albums ===
| Album | Details | Peak chart position | | | | |
| Album | Details | US | UK | AUS | GER | NZ |
|---|---|---|---|---|---|---|
| His Greatest Hits | Released: December 1974; Label: Deccca (SKL 5198) | 103 | 1 | — | — | 16 |
| Love Songs | Released: April 1981; Label: K-Tel (NZ 562); Note: Australia Only | —N/a | —N/a | 39 | —N/a | —N/a |
| Nothing But The Very Best (with Tom Jones) | Released: April 1982; Label: Hammard (HAMD 071); Note: Australia Only | —N/a | —N/a | 31 | —N/a | —N/a |
| Getting Sentimental | Released: April 1985; Label: TELSTAR (STAR2254); Note: Europe Only | —N/a | 35 | —N/a | — | —N/a |
| The Engelbert Humperdinck Collection | Released: March 1987; Label: TELSTAR (STAR2294) | — | 35 | — | — | — |
| Remember I Love You | Released: 1987; Label: White / RCA (VPCD 7633) | — | — | 100 | 5 | — |
| With Love: The Best Of | Released: 1987; Label: Dino Music (DIN 024) | — | — | — | — | 22 |
| The Very Best of John Rowles and Engelbert Humperdinck (with John Rowles) | Released: June 1990; Label: J&B (JB 413); Note: Australia Only | —N/a | —N/a | 34 | —N/a | —N/a |
| At His Very Best | Released: March 2000; Label: Universal (8449742) | — | 5 | — | — | 21 |
| How To Win Your Love | Released: June 2000; Label: Polystar (541980-2); Note: Europe Only | —N/a | — | —N/a | 100 | —N/a |
| I Want to Wake Up With You | Released: October 2001; Label: Universal (0149462) | — | 42 | — | — | — |
| His Greatest Love Songs | Released: March 2004; Label: Universal (9817857) | — | 4 | — | — | — |
| Greatest Hits And More | Released: April 2007; Label: Universal (9847095) | — | 21 | — | — | — |
| Release Me – The Best Of Engelbert Humperdinck | Released: May 2012; Label: Decca (5338776) | — | 21 | — | — | 3 |
| 50 | Released: May 2017; Label: Decca (5377274) | — | 5 | — | — | — |
| Essential | Released: March 2021; Label: Decca (3580145) | — | 97 | — | — | — |

== Singles ==
| Year | Single (A-side, B-side) Both sides from same album except where indicated | Chart positions | | | | | | | | | | | | | | | Album |
| Year | Single (A-side, B-side) Both sides from same album except where indicated | UK | US | US AC | US Country | CB | AU | CA | CA AC | BEL (FL) | IE | GE | NL | NZ | SA | SWI | Album |
|---|---|---|---|---|---|---|---|---|---|---|---|---|---|---|---|---|---|
| 1966 | "Stay" b/w "Come Over Here" | – | – | – | – | – | – | – | – | – | – | – | – | – | – | – | Non-LP Tracks |
| 1966 | "Dommage Dommage" b/w "When I Say Goodnight" | 55 (Note: Chart position is from the official UK "Breakers List".) | – | – | – | – | – | – | – | 1 | – | – | – | – | – | – | Non-LP Tracks |
| 1967 | "Release Me (and Let Me Love Again)" b/w "Ten Guitars" | 1 | 4 | 28 | – | 3 | 5 | 1 | – | 1 | 1 | 20 | 1 | 2 | 1 | – | Release Me |
| 1967 | "There Goes My Everything" b/w "You Love" (non-LP track) | 2 | 20 | – | – | 24 | 35 | 16 | – | 2 | 2 | 31 | – | 12 | 2 | – | Non-LP Tracks |
| 1967 | "The Last Waltz" b/w "That Promise" (non-LP track) | 1 | 25 | 6 | – | 21 | 1 | 4 | – | 1 | 1 | 14 | 6 | 1 | 1 | 9 | The Last Waltz |
| 1968 | "Am I That Easy to Forget" b/w "Pretty Ribbon" (non-LP track) | 3 | 18 | 1 | – | 24 | 8 | 30 | – | 1 | 1 | – | – | 13 | 10 | – | The Last Waltz (US); His Greatest Hits (UK) |
| 1968 | "A Man Without Love (Quando m'innamoro)" b/w "Call On Me" | 2 | 19 | 3 | – | 18 | 6 | 8 | – | 1 | 1 | 6 | 1 | 4 | 2 | 1 | A Man Without Love |
| 1968 | "Les Bicyclettes de Belsize" b/w "Three Little Words (I Love You)" (non-LP track) | 5 | 31 | 3 | – | 22 | 11 | 15 | – | 2 | 6 | 26 | 3 | 10 | 12 | – | Engelbert |
| 1969 | "The Way It Used to Be" b/w "A Good Thing Going" | 3 | 42 | 4 | – | 26 | 63 | 18 | 4 | 1 | 6 | – | – | 18 | 9 | – | Engelbert |
| 1969 | "I'm a Better Man" b/w "Cafe (Cosa Hai Messo Nel Caffe)" | 15 | 38 | 6 | – | 39 | 79 | 40 | 17 | 8 | – | – | – | – | – | – | Engelbert Humperdinck |
| 1969 | "Winter World of Love" b/w "Take My Heart" (from Release Me) | 7 | 16 | 3 | – | 13 | 78 | 8 | 1 | 4 | 3 | 27 | 14 | 20 | – | – | Engelbert Humperdinck |
| 1970 | "My Marie" b/w "Our Song (La Paloma)" | 31 | 43 | 2 | – | 27 | 89 | 42 | – | 4 | – | – | – | – | – | – | Non-LP Tracks |
| 1970 | "Sweetheart" b/w "Born To Be Wanted" (non-LP track) | 22 | 47 | 2 | – | 38 | 27 | 34 | 7 | 2 | 18 | – | – | 7 | – | – | Sweetheart |
| 1971 | "Santa Lija (Sogno d'amore)" b/w "Stranger Step Into My World" (non-LP track) | 57 | – | – | – | – | – | – | – | 23 | – | – | – | – | – | – | Sweetheart |
| 1971 | "When There's No You" b/w "Stranger, Step Into My World" (non-LP track) | 47 | 45 | 1 | – | 37 | 93 | 28 | 15 | – | – | – | – | – | – | – | Sweetheart |
| 1971 | "Another Time, Another Place" b/w "Morning" (UK) "You're The Window Of My World" (US, non-LP track) | 13 | 43 | 5 | – | 40 | 60 | 16 | 11 | 20 | – | – | – | – | – | – | Another Time, Another Place |
| 1972 | "Too Beautiful to Last" b/w "A Hundred Times A Day" (non-LP track) | 14 | 86 | 16 | – | 75 | 52 | 66 | – | – | 17 | – | – | – | 9 | – | In Time |
| 1972 | "In Time" b/w "How Does It Feel" (non-LP track) | – | 69 | 12 | – | 86 | 91 | 49 | 14 | 30 | – | – | – | – | – | – | In Time |
| 1972 | "I Never Said Goodbye" b/w "Time After Time" | – | 61 | 18 | – | 70 | – | 73 | 11 | – | – | – | – | – | – | – | In Time |
| 1973 | "I'm Leavin' You" b/w "Time After Time" (UK, from In Time) "My Summer Song" (US) | – | 99 | 17 | – | 90 | 42 | – | 54 | – | – | – | – | – | – | – | King Of Hearts |
| 1973 | "Love Is All" b/w "Lady Of The Night" (non-LP track) | 44 | 91 | 33 | – | 95 | – | – | 75 | – | – | – | – | – | – | – | The World Of Engelbert Humperdinck (UK); Non-LP Track (US) |
| 1974 | "Free As The Wind (Theme from Papillon)" b/w "My Friend the Wind" (non-LP track) | – | – | 34 | – | – | – | – | – | – | – | – | – | – | – | – | My Love |
| 1974 | "Catch Me, I'm Falling" b/w "Love, Oh Precious Love" (non-LP track) | – | – | 44 | – | – | – | – | – | – | – | – | – | – | – | – | My Love |
| 1975 | "Forever And Ever" b/w "Precious Love" | – | – | 43 | – | – | 94 | – | – | – | – | – | – | – | – | – | Non-LP Tracks |
| 1975 | "This Is What You Mean To Me" b/w "A World Without Music" (from After the Lovin') | – | 102 | 14 | – | 87 | – | 60 | 19 | – | – | – | – | – | – | – | After The Lovin' |
| 1976 | "After the Lovin'" b/w "Let's Remember The Good Times" (from After The Lovin') | – | 8 | 1 | 40 | 5 | 13 | 7 | – | – | – | – | – | 1 | – | – | After The Lovin' |
| 1977 | "I Believe In Miracles" | – | – | 15 | – | – | – | – | 13 | – | – | – | – | – | – | – | Miracles |
| 1977 | "Goodbye My Friend" | – | 97 | 37 | 93 | – | – | – | – | – | – | – | – | – | – | – | Miracles |
| 1977 | "Lover's Holiday" b/w "Look At Me" (from Miracles) | – | – | 26 | – | – | – | – | 2 | – | – | – | – | – | – | – | Non-LP Track |
| 1978 | "Last Of The Romantics" b/w "I Have Paid The Toll" (non-LP track) | – | – | 28 | – | – | – | – | 1 | – | – | – | – | – | – | – | Last Of The Romantics |
| 1978 | "Love's In Need Of Love Today" b/w "Sweet Marjorene" (from Last Of The Romantics) | – | – | 44 | – | – | – | – | – | – | – | – | – | – | – | – | Last Of The Romantics |
| 1978 | "This Moment in Time" b/w "And The Day Begins" (non-LP track) | – | 58 | 1 | 93 | 88 | – | – | 14 | – | – | – | – | – | – | – | This Moment In Time |
| 1979 | "Can't Help Falling in Love" b/w "You Know Me" (from This Moment in Time) | – | – | 44 | – | – | – | – | 11 | – | – | – | – | – | – | – | This Moment In Time |
| 1979 | "A Much, Much Greater Love" b/w "Lovin' You Too Long" (from This Moment in Time) | – | – | 39 | – | – | – | – | – | – | – | – | – | – | – | – | This Moment In Time |
| 1980 | "Any Kind Of Love At All" b/w "A Chance To Be A Hero" (from Love's Only Love) | – | – | – | – | – | – | – | – | – | – | – | – | – | – | – | Love's Only Love |
| 1980 | "Love's Only Love" b/w "Burning Embers" (non-LP track) | – | 83 | 28 | – | – | – | – | – | – | – | – | – | – | – | – | Love's Only Love |
| 1980 | "It's Not Easy To Live Together" b/w "Royal Affair" | – | – | – | – | – | – | – | – | – | – | – | – | – | – | – | Non-LP Tracks |
| 1981 | "When The Night Ends" b/w "Maybe This Time" (from Don't You Love Me Anymore?) | – | – | – | – | – | – | – | – | – | – | – | – | – | – | – | Don't You Love Me Anymore? |
| 1981 | "Don't You Love Me Anymore?" b/w "Till I Get It Right" (from Don't You Love Me Anymore?) | – | – | 41 | – | – | – | – | – | – | – | – | – | – | – | – | Don't You Love Me Anymore? |
| 1983 | "Til You And Your Lover Are Lovers Again" b/w "What Will I Write" (from You And Your Lover) | – | 77 | 17 | 39 | – | – | – | – | – | – | – | – | 29 | – | – | You And Your Lover |
| 1984 | "The Other Woman/The Other Man" b/w "Twenty Years Ago" | – | – | – | – | – | – | – | – | – | – | – | – | – | – | – | Non-LP Tracks |
| 1984 | "To All The Girls I've Loved Before" b/w "Between Two Fires" | – | – | – | – | – | – | – | – | – | – | – | – | – | – | – | Non-LP Tracks |
| 1985 | "Portofino" b/w "Love Life" | – | – | – | – | – | – | – | – | – | – | – | – | – | – | – | Träumen mit Engelbert |
| 1986 | "The Spanish Night is Over" b/w "Goodbye Maria" | – | – | – | – | – | – | – | – | 14 | – | 30 | 28 | – | – | – | Träumen mit Engelbert |
| 1986 | "Torero (She Brings Him Spanish Roses)" b/w "Torero (Dance Mix)" | – | – | – | – | – | – | – | – | – | – | 61 | – | – | – | – | Träumen mit Engelbert |
| 1987 | "On the Wings of a Silver Bird" b/w "I Love You" | – | – | – | – | – | – | – | – | – | – | 48 | 48 | – | – | – | Remember I Love You |
| 1987 | "Love Is The Reason" (with Gloria Gaynor) b/w "You Made A Believer Out Of Me" | – | – | – | – | – | – | – | – | – | – | – | – | – | – | – | Remember I Love You |
| 1988 | "Nothing's Gonna Change My Love for You" b/w "Under The Man In The Moon" | 93 | – | – | – | – | – | – | – | – | – | – | – | – | – | – | Remember I Love You |
| 1988 | "Radio Dancing" b/w "Lady Lolita" | – | – | – | – | – | – | – | – | – | – | 53 | 79 | – | – | – | In Liebe |
| 1988 | "Alone In The Night" b/w "One World" | – | – | – | – | – | – | – | – | – | – | – | – | – | – | – | In Liebe |
| 1989 | "I Can Never Let You Go" b/w "Bella Italia" | – | – | – | – | – | – | – | – | – | – | – | – | – | – | – | In Liebe |
| 1989 | "Red Roses For My Lady" b/w "Angel Love" (non-LP track) | – | – | – | – | – | – | – | – | – | – | 50 | – | – | – | – | Ich Denk An Dich |
| 1989 | "Only A Lonely Child" b/w "I Gave You All My Love" | – | – | – | – | – | – | – | – | – | – | – | – | – | – | – | Ich Denk An Dich |
| 1989 | "I Wanna Rock You In My Wildest Dreams" b/w "You Are So Beautiful" | – | – | – | – | – | – | – | – | – | – | – | – | – | – | – | Ich Denk An Dich |
| 1991 | "Coming Home" b/w "You Are The Reason" | – | – | – | – | – | – | – | – | – | – | – | – | – | – | – | Träumen mit Engelbert 2 |
| 1992 | "Hello Out There" b/w "Falling In Love Again" | – | – | – | – | – | – | – | – | – | – | – | – | – | – | – | Hello Out There |
| 1993 | "My Special Inspiration"; CD single | – | – | – | – | – | – | – | – | – | – | – | – | – | – | – | Yours/Quiereme Mucho |
| 1993 | "Moonlight Angel"; CD single | – | – | – | – | – | – | – | – | – | – | – | – | – | – | – | Yours/Quiereme Mucho |
| 1996 | "Lesbian Seagull"; CD single | – | – | – | – | – | 19 | – | – | – | – | – | – | 35 | – | – | Beavis and Butt-head Do America soundtrack |
| 1998 | "Release Me / Gotta Get Release"; CD single | – | – | – | – | – | – | – | – | – | – | – | – | 45 | – | – | The Dance Album |
| 1998 | "Quando Quando Quando"; CD single | 40 | – | – | – | – | – | – | – | – | – | – | – | – | – | – | The Dance Album |
| 2000 | "How To Win Your Love"; CD single | 59 | – | – | – | – | – | – | – | – | – | – | – | – | – | – | It's All In The Game |
| 2002 | "Once In A While"; CD single | – | – | – | – | – | – | – | – | – | – | – | – | – | – | – | After Dark |
| 2004 | "Release Me" (2004 Re-Release); CD single | 51 | – | – | – | – | – | – | – | – | – | – | – | – | – | – | His Greatest Love Songs |
| 2010 | "Tell Me Where It Hurts"; CD single | – | – | – | – | – | – | – | – | – | – | – | – | – | – | – | Released |
| 2012 | "Love Will Set You Free"; CD single | 60 | – | – | – | – | – | – | – | 72 | – | – | 77 | – | – | – | Release Me: The Best Of Engelbert Humperdinck |
"–" denotes a release that did not chart or was not issued in that region.
