= The Way It Used to Be (Engelbert Humperdinck song) =

Single by Engelbert Humperdinck

from the album Engelbert
- B-side: "A Good Thing Going"
- Released: 1969
- Genre: Traditional pop
- Length: 3:09
- Label: Decca (UK); Parrot (US)
- Songwriters: Music: Corrado Conti & Franco Cassano; English lyrics: Roger Cook & Roger Greenaway; Italian lyrics: Gianni Argenio
- Producer: Peter Sullivan

Engelbert Humperdinck singles chronology
"Les Bicyclettes de Belsize" (1968)	"The Way It Used to Be" (1969)	"I'm a Better Man (For Having Loved You)" (1969)

"The Way It Used to Be" is a song recorded by Engelbert Humperdinck, which was released on the album Engelbert and as a single in 1969. It is an English language adaptation of the Italian language song "Melodia", which was originally released by Isabella Iannetti in 1968.

The song was a top ten hit in multiple countries, and spent 14 weeks on the UK Singles Chart, peaking at No. 3, while reaching No. 1 in Flanders and Singapore, No. 3 in Malaysia, No. 5 in Yugoslavia, No. 6 on the Irish Singles Chart, No. 7 on Norway's VG-lista, No. 7 in Wallonia, and No. 9 in South Africa. The song was a hit in other nations as well.

In the United States, the song spent 11 weeks on the Billboard Hot 100 chart, peaking at No. 42, while reaching No. 4 on Billboard's Easy Listening chart. The song was ranked No. 26 on Billboard's year-end ranking of 1969's "Top Easy Listening Singles".

== Chart performance ==
Chart (1969)	Peak position
Canada - RPM 100	18
Canada - RPM Adult contemporary	4
Flanders	1
Ireland (IRMA)	6
Malaysia (Radio Malaysia)	3
Netherlands (Parool Top 20)	19
Netherlands (Veronica Top 40)	21
New Zealand Listener	18
Norway (VG-lista)	7
Singapore (Radio Singapore)	1
South Africa (Springbok Radio)	9
UK Singles Chart	3
US Billboard Hot 100	42
US Billboard Easy Listening	4
US Cash Box Top 100	26
US Record World 100 Top Pops	24
US Record World Top Non-Rock	4
US Record World Juke Box Top 25	8
Wallonia	7
Yugoslavia (Novi Džuboks)	5

== Other versions ==
- An instrumental version was released by Bert Kaempfert & His Orchestra, on his 1969 album Traces of Love.
- Fredi released a Finnish language adaptation titled "Se päivä tulee kerran" in 1969, which reached No. 2 in Finland.
- Jimmy Fontana released a version of "Melodia" in 1969, which bubbled under the top 50 in Wallonia.
- Milyo Naryo released a Tagalog language adaptation titled "Naka-Table Na Kita".
