= Live at the Riviera, Las Vegas =

Live and S.R.O. at the Riviera Hotel, Las Vegas

Live album by Engelbert Humperdinck
- Released: 1971
- Label: Decca

Engelbert Humperdinck chronology
Another Time, Another Place (1971)	Live and S.R.O. at the Riviera Hotel, Las Vegas (1971)	In Time (1972)

Professional ratings
Review scores
Source	Rating
AllMusic	3/5 stars

Live and S.R.O. at the Riviera Hotel, Las Vegas (or simply Live at the Riviera, Las Vegas) is a live album by British singer Engelbert Humperdinck, released in December 1971 on Decca Records (on Parrot Records in the United States and Canada).

The album spent one week on the UK official albums chart at number 45.

== Track listing ==
Side 1

1. Intro
  "Around the World" (Young; Adamson, Rouzaud)
  "Till" (Danvers; Sigman, Galano)
  "Around The World in 80 Days" (Young; Adamson, Rouzaud)
2. "My Prayer" (Boulanger; Kennedy)
3. "A Man Without Love" (Pace, Livragh; Mason, Panzeri)
4. "Help Me Make It Through the Night" (Kristofferson)
5. "My Wife the Dancer" (Mascari, Wenzlaff)
6. "It's Impossible" (Manzanero, Wayne)

Side 2

1. "Just a Little Bit of You" (Frazier)
2. Hit Medley
  "Am I That Easy to Forget" (Belew, Stevenson)
  "There Goes My Everything" (Frazier)
  "The Last Waltz" (Reed, Mason)
  "The Way It Used to Be" (Cassano, Conti; Cook, Greenaway, Argenio)
  "When There's No You" (Reed, Rae)
  "Les Bicyclettes de Belsize" (Reed, Mason)
3. "You'll Never Walk Alone" (Rodgers; Hammerstein) — 3:59
4. Band introduction — 2:21
5. "Love the One You're With" (Stills) — 3:37
6. "Release Me" (Miller, Williams, Yount; Harris) — 3:21

== Charts ==
Chart (1972)	Peak position
UK Albums (OCC)	45
US Billboard 200	45
