= Another Time, Another Place (Engelbert Humperdinck song) =

Single by Engelbert Humperdinck

from the album Another Time, Another Place Decca SKL 5097
- B-side: "You're the Window of My World"
- Released: August 1971
- Genre: Popular Music
- Length: 3:00
- Label: Decca F 13212
- Songwriters: Mike Leander, Eddie Seago
- Producer: Gordon Mills

"Another Time, Another Place" is a song by Engelbert Humperdinck, the title track of his 1971 LP. It became an international hit, reaching No. 13 in the United Kingdom and No. 16 in Canada.

== Background ==
The song was written by Mike Leander & Eddie Seago. It was an unsuccessful entrant in a concert, but it would later find success with Engelbert Humperdinck. It was released in the UK on Decca (F 13212) in August 1971, and in the US on Parrot (45-40065).

== Chart performance ==
In late 1971, the song peaked at No. 43 in the US. It also made No. 5 on the US Adult Contemporary chart. For the week ending November 27, 1971, Billboard recorded its chart positions at No. 10 in Belgium, No. 2 in Malaysia and No. 2 in Singapore.

Chart (1971)	Peak position
Australia (Kent Music Report)	60
Belgium	10
Canada RPM Adult Contemporary	12
Canada RPM Top Singles	16
Malaysia	2
Singapore	2
UK Singles (OCC)	13
U.S. Billboard Hot 100	43
U.S. Billboard Easy Listening	5
U.S. Cash Box Top 100	40
