= His Greatest Hits (Engelbert Humperdinck album) =

Compilation album by Engelbert Humperdinck
- Released: 1974
- Label: Decca

Engelbert Humperdinck chronology
My Love (1973)	His Greatest Hits (1974)	After the Lovin' (1976)

His Greatest Hits is a compilation album by British singer Engelbert Humperdinck, released in 1974 on Decca Records (on Parrot Records in the United States and Canada).

The album spent 34 weeks on the UK official albums chart, peaking for three consecutive weeks at number one.

== Track listing ==
Side 1
No.	Title	Writer(s)	Length
1.	"Release Me"	Williams, Miller, Harris, Yount	3:17
2.	"Quando Quando Quando"	Testa, Boone, Renis	3:16
3.	"Les Bicyclettes de Belsize"	Mason, Reed	3:10
4.	"Spanish Eyes"	Kaempfert, Singleton, Snyder	3:14
5.	"Am I That Easy to Forget"	Belew, Stevenson	3:05
6.	"There Goes My Everything"	Frazier	2:52

Side 2
No.	Title	Writer(s)	Length
1.	"A Man Without Love"	Mason, Pace, Panzeri, Livraghi	3:17
2.	"Another Time, Another Place"	Seago, Leander	2:59
3.	"Love Me with All Your Heart"	Martinoli, Rigual, Vaughn	3:17
4.	"The Way It Used to Be"	Conti, Cassano, Argenio, Cook, Greenaway	3:07
5.	"Winter World of Love"	Mason, Reed	3:18
6.	"The Last Waltz"	Mason, Reed	2:57

== Charts ==
Chart (1974–1975)	Peak position
UK Albums (Official Charts)	1
US Billboard 200	103
