= After the Lovin' (album) =

1976 album by Engelbert Humperdinck

Studio album by Engelbert Humperdinck
- Released: 1976 (U.S.)
- Genre: Pop
- Length: 36:59
- Label: Epic
- Producer: Bobby Eli; Charlie Calello; Joel Diamond

Engelbert Humperdinck chronology
His Greatest Hits (1974)	After the Lovin' (1976)	Miracles (1977)

Singles from After the Lovin'
- 1. "After the Lovin'" Released: October 1976

Professional ratings
Review scores
Source	Rating
AllMusic	2.5/5 stars

After the Lovin' is an album by English singer Engelbert Humperdinck, released in 1976. The album was nominated for a Grammy in 1977 in the category Best Pop Vocal Performance, Male, but did not win.

== Track listing ==
No.	Title	Writer(s)	Producer(s)	Length
1.	"After the Lovin'"	Alan Bernstein, Ritchie Adams	Charlie Calello, Joel Diamond	3:55
2.	"Can't Smile Without You"	Chris Arnold, David Martin, Geoff Morrow	Charlie Calello	3:26
3.	"Let's Remember the Good Times"	Arthur Schroeck	Charlie Calello, Joel Diamond	3:18
4.	"I Love Making Love to You"	Bobby Eli, Terry Collins	Bobby Eli	3:54
5.	"This I Find is Beautiful"	Larry Weiss, Mack David	Charlie Calello, Joel Diamond	3:02
6.	"This is What You Mean to Me"	Bobby Eli, Terry Collins	Bobby Eli	3:34
7.	"World Without Music"	Bobby Eli, Terry Collins	Bobby Eli	3:52
8.	"Let Me Happen to You"	Bobby Eli, Terry Collins	Charlie Calello, Joel Diamond	4:06
9.	"I Can't Live a Dream"	Arnold Capitanelli	Charlie Calello, Joel Diamond	4:27
10.	"The Hungry Years"	Howard Greenfield, Neil Sedaka	Charlie Calello, Joel Diamond	4:25
Total length:				36:59
