= Sweetheart (album) =

Studio album by Engelbert Humperdinck
- Released: 1971
- Label: Decca

Engelbert Humperdinck chronology
We Made It Happen (1970)	Sweetheart (1971)	Another Time, Another Place (1971)

Sweetheart is a studio album by British singer Engelbert Humperdinck, released in 1971 on Decca Records (on Parrot Records in the United States and Canada).

The album didn't chart in the UK.

== Track listing ==
Side 1
No.	Title	Writer(s)	Length
1.	"Sweetheart"	B. & M. Gibb	3:01
2.	"California Maiden"	Sedgwick	3:15
3.	"Woman in My Life"	Macaulay, D'Abo	3:13
4.	"I'll Be Your Baby Tonight"	Dylan	3:07
5.	"Take Me for Now Love"	Monda	2:58
6.	"The First Time Ever I Saw Your Face"	McColl	3:47

Side 2
No.	Title	Writer(s)	Length
1.	"Santa Lija (Sogno d'amore)"	Bigazzi, Polito, Mason	3:05
2.	"Live and Just Let Live"	Aldo Frank, Paul Anka	3:00
3.	"For the Good Times"	Kris Kristofferson	3:47
4.	"Put Your Hand in the Hand"	McLellan	2:51
5.	"When There's No You"	Reed Rae	2:57

== Charts ==
Chart (1971)	Peak position
US Billboard 200	22
