= Engelbert Humperdinck (album) =

Studio album by Engelbert Humperdinck
- Released: 1969
- Genre: Traditional pop
- Length: 38:28
- Label: Decca (UK); Parrot (US)
- Producer: Peter Sullivan

Engelbert Humperdinck chronology
Engelbert (1969)	Engelbert Humperdinck (1969)	We Made It Happen (1969)

Singles from Engelbert Humperdinck
- 1. "I'm a Better Man" Released: August 1969; 2. "Winter World of Love" Released: November 1969

Professional ratings
Review scores
Source	Rating
AllMusic	2.5/5 stars

Engelbert Humperdinck is an album released in 1969 by Engelbert Humperdinck. It spent many weeks on the Billboard Top LPs chart in 1970. It contained the hits "I'm a Better Man" and "Winter World of Love".

== Chart performance ==
After seven weeks on the Billboard albums chart, the album peaked at No. 5 on February 14, 1970.

== Track listing ==
No	Title	Composer
A1	"I'm a Better Man"	Burt Bacharach, Hal David
A2	"Gentle on My Mind"	John Hartford
A3	"Love Letters"	Edward Heyman, Victor Young
A4	"A Time For Us" (Love Theme from Romeo And Juliet)	Nino Rota, Eddie Snyder, Larry Kusik
A5	"Didn't We"	Jimmy Webb
A6	"I Wish You Love"	Albert Beach, Charles Trenet
B1	"Aquarius / Let The Sunshine In"	Galt MacDermot, Gerome Ragni, James Rado
B2	"All You've Gotta Do Is Ask"	Gualtiero Malgoni, Jack Fishman, Mogol
B3	"The Signs Of Love"	Bert Kaempfert, Gordon Mills, Herbert Rehbein
B4	"Café" (Cosa Hai Messo Nel Caffe)	Giancarlo Bigazzi, Riccardo del Turco
B5	"Let's Kiss Tomorrow Goodbye" (Un Nuovo Mondo)	Daniele Pace, Lorenzo Pilat, Mario Panzeri
B6	"Winter World of Love"	Barry Mason, Les Reed
