= Ritchie Adams =

American singer and songwriter

Richard Adam Ziegler (December 15, 1938 – March 6, 2017), known professionally as Ritchie Adams, was an American singer and songwriter.

== Biography ==
Born in New York City, by 1959 he joined The Fireflies, and sang lead vocals on their hit record "You Were Mine", as well as on their follow-ups including "I Can't Say Goodbye". He released a string of solo singles during the early 1960s on the Ribbon, Imperial, Beltone and Congress record labels, but with little success.

He developed a more successful career as a songwriter, co-writing "Tossin' and Turnin'", a hit in the US in 1961 for Bobby Lewis; and "Happy Summer Days", recorded by Ronnie Dove in 1966. In the late 1960s, he co-wrote songs with Mark Barkan, including several on The Archies' debut album, and produced the Archies' song "Love is Living in You". He and Barkan are also credited with writing "The Tra La La Song (One Banana, Two Banana)", a hit for the Banana Splits in 1969 and later in the UK by The Dickies. Adams was a music director on the Banana Splits TV show, and also contributed to songs including "Goin' Back" from the band Toomorrow's soundtrack to the 1970 film of the same name, starring Olivia Newton-John.

In the 1970s, he co-wrote songs with Alan Bernstein for Engelbert Humperdinck, including "After the Lovin'" (1976) and "This Moment in Time" (1978), as well as Al Martino's "The Next Hundred Years" (1977).

Adams died in 2017, aged 78, after a long illness.
