= A Man Without Love (album) =

Studio album by Engelbert Humperdinck
- Released: 1968
- Label: Decca

Engelbert Humperdinck chronology
The Last Waltz (1967)	A Man Without Love (1968)	Engelbert (1969)

Professional ratings
Review scores
Source	Rating
AllMusic	3/5 stars

A Man Without Love is a studio album by British singer Engelbert Humperdinck, released in 1968 on Decca Records (on Parrot Records in the United States and Canada).

The album spent 45 weeks on the UK official albums chart, peaking at number 3.

== Track listing ==
Side 1
No.	Title	Writer(s)	Length
1.	"A Man Without Love"	Daniele Pace, Mario Panzeri, Roberto Livraghi, Barry Mason	3:18
2.	"Can't Take My Eyes Off of You"	Bob Crewe, Bob Gaudio	3:36
3.	"From Here to Eternity"	Frederick Karger, Robert Wells	3:48
4.	"Spanish Eyes"	Bert Kaempfert, Charles Singleton, Eddie Snyder	3:12
5.	"A Man and a Woman"	Francis Lai, Jerry Keller, Pierre Barouh	3:33
6.	"Quando, Quando, Quando"	Tony Renis, Alberto Testa, Hans Bradtke	3:16

Side 2
No.	Title	Writer(s)	Length
1.	"Up, Up and Away"	Jimmy Webb	2:32
2.	"Wonderland by Night"	Klaus Günter Neumann, Lincoln Chase	2:58
3.	"What a Wonderful World"	George David Weiss, George Douglas	2:42
4.	"Call on Me"	Gordon Mills	2:43
5.	"By the Time I Get to Phoenix"	Jimmy Webb	3:04
6.	"The Shadow of Your Smile"	Johnny Mandel, Paul Francis Webster	2:29

== Charts ==
Chart (1968)	Peak position
UK Albums (Official Charts)	3
US Billboard 200	12

== Promotional Video Location ==
The iconic 1968 promotional video for Engelbert Humperdinck's hit "A Man Without Love" was filmed in the Principality of Monaco. In the footage, Humperdinck is seen lip-syncing to the track while walking down the Ruelle Sainte-Barbe, a historic stone staircase and pedestrian path located in Monaco-Ville. The imposing building prominently featured in the background of the shot is the Prince's Palace of Monaco (Palais Princier de Monaco), easily identifiable by its classic architecture and clock tower. The architectural landscape of this filming location remains exceptionally well-preserved and can be explored today via Google Street View at coordinates 43°43'50.6"N 7°25'15.5"E.
