= Love's Only Love =

Studio album by Engelbert Humperdinck
- Released: 1980
- Studio: Devonshire Sound Studios
- Label: Epic
- Producer: Joel Diamond

Engelbert Humperdinck chronology
This Moment in Time (1979)	Love's Only Love (1980)	A Merry Christmas with Engelbert Humperdinck (1980)

Professional ratings
Review scores
Source	Rating
AllMusic	3.5/5 stars

Love's Only Love is a studio album by British singer Engelbert Humperdinck, released in 1980 by Epic.

== Track listing ==
Side 1
No.	Title	Length
1.	"Love's Only Love"	3:54
2.	"Best Times of My Life"	2:53
3.	"Just Tell Me You Love Me"	3:51
4.	"A Chance to Be a Hero"	3:28
5.	"Don't Cry Out Loud"	3:37

Side 2
No.	Title	Length
1.	"Please Understand"	3:21
2.	"Unforgettable"	3:37
3.	"Any Kind of Love at All"	4:01
4.	"Don't Touch That Dial"	2:49
5.	"If You Love Me (Really Love Me)"	4:36
