= Love Will Set You Free =

2012 single by Engelbert Humperdinck

Single by Engelbert Humperdinck

from the album Release Me - The Best Of Engelbert Humperdinck
- B-side: "Too Beautiful to Last"; "My Way"
- Released: 19 March 2012
- Recorded: 2012
- Genre: Contemporary pop
- Length: 2:58
- Label: Conehead UK
- Songwriters: Martin Terefe, Sacha Skarbek
- Producers: Terefe, Skarbek

Engelbert Humperdinck singles chronology
"Tell Me Where it Hurts" (2010)	"Love Will Set You Free" (2012)

Music video
- "Love Will Set You Free" on YouTube

Eurovision Song Contest 2012 entry
- Country: United Kingdom
- Artist: Engelbert Humperdinck
- Language: English
- Composers: Terefe, Skarbek
- Lyricists: Terefe, Skarbek

Finals performance
- Final result: 25th
- Final points: 12

Entry chronology
- ◄ "I Can" (2011)
- "Believe in Me" (2013) ►

"Love Will Set You Free" is a ballad written by Swedish producer Martin Terefe and Ivor Novello Awards winner Sacha Skarbek. As sung by Engelbert Humperdinck, it represented the United Kingdom in the Eurovision Song Contest 2012, where it ultimately placed 25th. The song was unveiled by the BBC on 19 March 2012 on its Eurovision homepage.

== Music video ==
A music video to accompany the release of "Love Will Set You Free" was first released onto YouTube on 19 March 2012 at a total length of three minutes.

== Track listing ==
Digital download
No.	Title	Length
1.	"Love Will Set You Free"	2:58
2.	"Too Beautiful to Last"	3:11
3.	"My Way"	3:54

== Charts ==
Chart (2012)	Peak position
Belgium (Ultratip Bubbling Under Flanders)	77
UK Independent Chart (Official Charts Company)	3
UK Singles Chart (Official Charts Company)	60

== Release history ==
Region	Date	Format	Label
United Kingdom	19 March 2012	Digital download, CD	Conehead
