= After the Lovin' =

Single by Engelbert Humperdinck

from the album After the Lovin'
- B-side: "Let's Remember the Good Times"
- Released: October 1976
- Genre: Pop, easy listening
- Length: 3:55
- Label: Epic
- Composer: Ritchie Adams
- Lyricist: Alan Bernstein
- Producers: Joel Diamond, Charlie Calello

Engelbert Humperdinck singles chronology
"This Is What You Mean to"	"After the Lovin'" (1976)

"After the Lovin'" is a single performed by Engelbert Humperdinck, produced by Joel Diamond and Charlie Calello, and composed by Ritchie Adams with lyrics by Alan Bernstein. The single was a U.S. top-ten hit in late 1976/early 1977, reaching number eight on the Billboard Hot 100 and number five on the Cash Box Top 100. It became a RIAA gold record. It is ranked as the 61st biggest U.S. hit of 1977. The song also reached number 40 on the country singles chart (which, despite spending much of his early career recording country songs, was his first appearance in the country top 40 charts) and spent two weeks atop the easy listening chart. It was Humperdinck's final Top 40 Billboard hit.

"After the Lovin'" reached number seven on the Canadian chart ranking 80th for the year 1977. It hit number one on Canada's Adult Contemporary list.

In New Zealand, the song spent two weeks at number one, ranking 10th for the year 1977 in that country.

The song failed, however, to chart in the UK, despite Humperdinck's earlier successes.

Engelbert's album After the Lovin', on which the single appeared, was nominated for a Grammy in the category Best Pop Vocal Performance, Male, in 1977.

== Chart performance ==
=== Weekly singles charts ===
Chart (1976–1977)	Peak position
Australia	13
Canada RPM Top Singles	7
Canada Adult Contemporary	1
New Zealand	1
U.S. Billboard Hot 100	8
U.S. Billboard Adult Contemporary	1
U.S. Billboard Hot Country Singles	40
U.S. Cash Box Top 100	5

=== Year-end charts ===
Chart (1977)	Rank
Australia	63
Canada RPM Top Singles	80
New Zealand	10
U.S. Billboard Hot 100	61
U.S. Billboard Adult Contemporary	15

== Cover versions ==
Barbara Mandrell covered "After the Lovin'" on her 1977 LP, Lovers, Friends and Strangers. It was nominated for a Grammy in the category Best Country Vocal Performance, Female, in 1977.

== See also ==
- List of number-one adult contemporary singles of 1976 (U.S.)

== Bibliography ==
- The Billboard Book of Top 40 Hits, 9th Edition, 2010 : Billboard; ISBN 978-0823085545
