= We Made It Happen =

Studio album by Engelbert Humperdinck
- Released: 1970
- Label: Decca

Engelbert Humperdinck chronology
Engelbert Humperdinck (1969)	We Made It Happen (1970)	Sweetheart (1971)

Professional ratings
Review scores
Source	Rating
AllMusic	3/5 stars

We Made It Happen is a studio album by British singer Engelbert Humperdinck, released in 1970 on Decca Records (on Parrot Records in the United States and Canada).

The album spent 11 weeks on the UK official albums chart, peaking at number 17.

== Track listing ==
Side 1
No.	Title	Writer(s)	Length
1.	"We Made It Happen"	Anka	3:00
2.	"My Cherie Amour"	Wonder, Moy, Cosby	3:00
3.	"Raindrops Keep Fallin' on My Head"	Bacharach, David	2:15
4.	"Love Me with All Your Heart"	C. & M. Rigual; Vaughn	3:15
5.	"Words"	B. R. & M. Gibb	2:50
6.	"Something"	Harrison	2:20

Side 2
No.	Title	Writer(s)	Length
1.	"Everybody's Talkin'"	Fred Neil	2:15
2.	"Love for Love (Ciao, My Love)"	Martini, Natili; Polizzy, Albula, Owen	3:08
3.	"Just Say I Love Her"	Kalmanoff, Falvo	3:05
4.	"My Wife the Dancer"	Mascari, Wenzlaff	2:50
5.	"Wand'rin' Star" (missing on the US release by Parrot)	Loewe, Lerner	3:00
6.	"Leavin' on a Jet Plane"	Denver	3:35

== Charts ==
Chart (1970)	Peak position
UK Albums (Official Charts)	17
US Billboard 200	19
