= Winter World of Love =

Single by Engelbert Humperdinck

from the album Engelbert Humperdinck
- B-side: "Take My Heart"
- Released: 1969
- Genre: Traditional pop
- Length: 3:20
- Label: Decca (UK); Parrot (US)
- Songwriters: Barry Mason & Les Reed
- Producer: Peter Sullivan

Engelbert Humperdinck singles chronology
"I'm a Better Man (For Having Loved You)" (1969)	"Winter World of Love" (1969)	"My Marie" (1970)

"Winter World of Love" is a song recorded by Engelbert Humperdinck, which was released on his eponymous album and as a single in 1969.

The song was an international hit and spent 13 weeks on the UK Singles Chart, peaking at No. 7, while reaching No. 3 on the Irish Singles Chart, and No. 4 in Flanders. In Canada, the song reached No. 8 on the "RPM 100" and No. 1 on RPM's adult contemporary chart. In the United States, the song spent 12 weeks on the Billboard Hot 100 chart, peaking at No. 16, while reaching No. 3 on Billboard's Easy Listening chart. The song was a hit in other nations as well.

== Chart performance ==
Chart (1969–1970)	Peak position
Australia	78
Canada - RPM 100	8
Canada - RPM Adult Contemporary	1
Belgium (Flanders)	4
Germany	27
Ireland (IRMA)	3
Netherlands (Veronica Top 40)	12
Netherlands (Hilversum 3 Top 30)	14
New Zealand (Listener)	20
UK Singles Chart	7
US Billboard Hot 100	16
US Billboard Easy Listening	3
US Cash Box Top 100	13
US Record World 100 Top Pops	14
US Record World Top Non-Rock	3
US Record World Juke Box Top 25	12
Belgium (Wallonia)	28
