= Another Time, Another Place (Engelbert Humperdinck album) =

Studio album by Engelbert Humperdinck
- Released: 1971
- Label: Decca

Engelbert Humperdinck chronology
Sweetheart (1971)	Another Time, Another Place (1971)	Live at the Riviera, Las Vegas (1971)

Another Time, Another Place is a studio album by British singer Engelbert Humperdinck, released in 1971 on Decca Records (on Parrot Records in the United States and Canada).

The album spent one week on the UK official albums chart at number 48.

== Track listing ==
Side 1
No.	Title	Writer(s)	Length
1.	"Another Time, Another Place"	Leander, Seago	3:00
2.	"Help Me Make It Through the Night"	Kristofferson	2:41
3.	"Our Love Will Rise Again"	Russell	2:45
4.	"Talk It Over in the Morning"	Williams, Nichols	2:38
5.	"There's an Island"	Meshel, Welch, Gilutin	3:22

Side 2
No.	Title	Writer(s)	Length
1.	"Revivin' Old Emotions"	Stephens	2:50
2.	"Nashville Lady"	Beland	3:19
3.	"Morning"	Graham	2:34
4.	"Twenty Miles from Home"	Williams, Nichols	2:41
5.	"Days of Icy Fingers"	Lambert, Potter	2:25
6.	"I'm Holding Your Memory (But He's Holding You)"	Belew, Givems	3:05

== Charts ==
Chart (1971)	Peak position
UK Albums (OCC)	48
US Billboard 200	25
