= Release Me (Engelbert Humperdinck album) =

Studio album by Engelbert Humperdinck
- Released: 1967
- Label: Decca

Engelbert Humperdinck chronology
Release Me (1967)	The Last Waltz (1967)

Professional ratings
Review scores
Source	Rating
AllMusic	4.5/5 stars

Release Me is a studio album by British singer Engelbert Humperdinck, released in 1967 on Decca Records (on Parrot Records in the United States and Canada).

The album spent 58 weeks on the UK official albums chart, peaking for two non-consecutive weeks at number 6.

== Track listing ==
Side 1
No.	Title	Writer(s)	Length
1.	"Release Me (and Let Me Love Again)"	Dub Williams, Eddie Miller, Robert Yount	3:17
2.	"Quiet Nights"	Antonio Carlos Jobim, Gene Lees	2:38
3.	"Yours Until Tomorrow"	Gerry Goffin, Carole King	2:50
4.	"There's a Kind of Hush"	Geoff Stephens, Leslie Reed	2:59
5.	"Ten Guitars"	Gordon Mills	2:40
6.	"This Is My Song"	Charlie Chaplin	3:22

Side 2
No.	Title	Writer(s)	Length
1.	"There Goes My Everything"	Dallas Frazier	2:52
2.	"Take My Heart"	Gordon Mills	2:26
3.	"Il mondo"	Carlo Pes, Gianni Meccia, Jimmy Fontana, Robert Mellin	3:04
4.	"Talking of Love"	Kurt Feltz, Marcel Stellman, Werner Scharfenberger	3:03
5.	"Walk Through the World with Me"	Kay Savage, Sandra Seamons	2:17
6.	"How Near Is Love"	Ivor Raymonde, Marcel Stellman, Osman Perez Freire, Richard Dix	2:44

== Charts ==
Chart (1967)	Peak position
UK Albums (Official Charts)	6
US Billboard 200	7
