= In Time (Engelbert Humperdinck album) =

Studio album by Engelbert Humperdinck
- Released: 1972
- Label: Decca

Engelbert Humperdinck chronology
Live at the Riviera, Las Vegas (1971)	In Time (1972)	King of Hearts (1973)

In Time is a studio album by British singer Engelbert Humperdinck, released in 1972 on Decca Records (on Parrot Records in the United States and Canada).

The album didn't chart in the UK.

== Track listing ==
Side 1
No.	Title	Writer(s)	Length
1.	"Baby I'm — A Want You"	Gates	2:35
2.	"Day After Day"	Ham	3:34
3.	"Too Beautiful to Last"	Webster, Bennett	3:06
4.	"(They Long to Be) Close to You"	Bacharach; David	2:42
5.	"Without You"	Ham, Evans	3:17

Side 2
No.	Title	Writer(s)	Length
1.	"Girl of Mine"	Reed, Mason	3:19
2.	"Time After Time"	Terry Dempsey	3:16
3.	"In Time"	Backy, Detto; Newell, King	3:13
4.	"I'm Together Again"	Weiss	3:15
5.	"Life Goes On"	Anka	2:47
6.	"I Never Said Goodbye"	Reed, Mason	3:53

== Charts ==
Chart (1972)	Peak position
US Billboard 200	72
