= My Love (Engelbert Humperdinck album) =

Studio album by Engelbert Humperdinck
- Released: 1973
- Label: Decca

Engelbert Humperdinck chronology
King of Hearts (1973)	My Love (1973)	His Greatest Hits (1974)

My Love is a studio album by British singer Engelbert Humperdinck, released in 1973 on Decca Records in the United Kingdom, and on Parrot Records in the United States and Canada.

The album didn't chart in the UK.

== Track listing ==
Side 1
No.	Title	Writer(s)	Length
1.	"You Are the Sunshine of My Life"	Stevie Wonder
2.	"And I Love You So"	Don McLean
3.	"Photograph"	Richard Starkey, George Harrison
4.	"Free as the Wind"	Jerry Goldsmith, Hal Shaper
5.	"My Love"	Paul McCartney, Linda McCartney

Side 2
No.	Title	Writer(s)	Length
1.	"Catch Me, I'm Falling"	Darryl Cotton, Steve Kipner, Michael Lloyd
2.	"Killing Me Softly with Her Song"	Charles Fox, Norman Gimbel
3.	"Show and Tell"	Jerry Fuller
4.	"Thankful for You"	Lally Stott
5.	"Second Tuesday in December"	Jack Blanchard

== Charts ==
Chart (1973)	Peak position
Australian Albums (Kent Music Report)	90
