= The Last Waltz (song) =

Single by Engelbert Humperdinck

from the album The Last Waltz
- B-side: "That Promise"
- Released: 18 August 1967
- Recorded: 1967
- Studio: Decca Studios, London, England
- Genre: Easy listening; pop
- Length: 2:57
- Label: Decca (UK/Ireland); Parrot (North America)
- Songwriters: Barry Mason and Les Reed
- Producer: Peter Sullivan

Engelbert Humperdinck singles chronology
"There Goes My Everything" (1967)	"The Last Waltz" (1967)	"Am I That Easy to Forget" (1968)

"The Last Waltz" is a ballad, written by Barry Mason and Les Reed. It was one of Engelbert Humperdinck's biggest hits, spending five weeks at number 1 on the UK Singles Chart, from September 1967 to October 1967, and has since sold over 1.17 million copies in the United Kingdom.

It was also extremely successful, both also in 1967, in French as La dernière valse by Mireille Mathieu, and in German (Der letzte Walzer) by the Austrian singer Peter Alexander.

== Background ==
The title of the song is something of a double entendre as it refers to both the narrator's first and last dances with the woman he loves: the first dance was the "last waltz" played at the party where the two met, and the final dance signified the end of their relationship after their romance had cooled.

== Chart performance ==
In Australia, "The Last Waltz" spent nine nonconsecutive weeks at number one. In the United States, "The Last Waltz" reached number 25 on the Billboard Hot 100 chart and made the top ten of the easy listening chart.

=== Weekly charts ===
Chart (1967)	Peak position
Australia (Go-Set)	1
Austria (Ö3 Austria Top 40)	3
Belgium (Ultratop 50 Flanders)	1
Belgium (Ultratop 50 Wallonia)	7
Canada RPM Top Singles	33
Germany (GfK)	14
Ireland (IRMA)	1
Netherlands (Dutch Top 40)	6
Netherlands (Single Top 100)	9
New Zealand (Listener)	1
Norway (VG-lista)	3
South Africa (Springbok)	1
Switzerland (Schweizer Hitparade)	9
UK Singles (Official Charts)	1
US Billboard Hot 100	25
US Billboard Easy Listening	6
US Cash Box Top 100	21

=== Year-end charts ===
Chart (1967)	Rank
South Africa	3

== Versions ==
- French-language versions, titled "La Dernière Valse", were released by Mireille Mathieu and Petula Clark in 1967. Mireille Mathieu's version spent three weeks at number one in the French pop charts, and also was a hit in Britain, reaching #26. Petula Clark's version entered the French charts in February 1968 and reached number two but did not chart in the UK. It is also included on her album, The Other Man's Grass Is Always Greener (1968).
- In 1968 Québec singer Stéphane released a French cover on his album Stéphane and in 1969 Ginette Reno also released a French version. Total sales of the different versions combined are over eight million copies.
- The Austrian singer Peter Alexander took the song as Der letzte Walzer in November 1967 to the top of the German charts. In his home country it only reached number ten.
- The Legendary Rocksteady Guitarist Lynn Taitt made a Rocksteady guitar Instrumental version of the ‘Last waltz’ in 1967, on the Jamaican WIRL record Label-(WL 176).
- Laurel Aitken also made an Instrumental version of the ‘Last Waltz’ in 1968 on the FAB record Label-(Fab 45). the Roots Reggae Band the Mighty Diamonds also recorded the ‘Last Waltz’ re-titled ‘The Last Dance’ in 1982, on two formats two 12” singles one in Jamaica on the Black Magic Label no matrix, and One on the UK JB Music Label-(JBD 040A), and a 7” pressing on the UK Label KR-(KR-16A).
- Adamski released a version of the song, featuring David McAlmont on vocals, in 2014 on his "This Is 3-Step" EP.

== Popular culture ==
- The song is associated with the English football club Gillingham F.C.
