= The Last Waltz (Engelbert Humperdinck album) =

Studio album by Engelbert Humperdinck
- Released: 1967
- Label: Decca

Engelbert Humperdinck chronology
| Release Me (1967) | The Last Waltz (1967) | A Man Without Love (1968) |

Professional ratings
Review scores
| Source | Rating |
|---|---|
| AllMusic | 3/5 stars |

The Last Waltz is a studio album by British singer Engelbert Humperdinck, released in 1967 on Decca Records (on Parrot Records in the United States and Canada).

The album spent 33 weeks on the UK official albums chart, peaking at number 3.

== Track listing ==
Side 1
| No. | Title | Writer(s) | Length |
|---|---|---|---|
| 1. | "The Last Waltz" | Mason, Reed | 3:05 |
| 2. | "Dance with Me" | Glick, Treadwell, Nahan, Lebish | 2:19 |
| 3. | "Two Different Worlds" | Frisch, Wayne | 2:34 |
| 4. | "If It Comes to That" | Reed | 2:40 |
| 5. | "Walk Hand in Hand" | Cowell | 3:01 |
| 6. | "A Place in the Sun" | Wells, Miller | 2:46 |

Side 2
| No. | Title | Writer(s) | Length |
|---|---|---|---|
| 1. | "Long Gone" | Reed | 2:41 |
| 2. | "All This World and the Seven Seas" | Walker | 2:49 |
| 3. | "Miss Elaine E. S. Jones" | Nicodemus | 2:02 |
| 4. | "Everybody Knows" | Mason, Reed | 2:24 |
| 5. | "Nature Boy" | ahbez | 2:46 |
| 6. | "To the Ends of the Earth" | N. & J. Sherman | 2:30 |

== Charts ==
| Chart (1967) | Peak position |
|---|---|
| UK Albums (Official Charts) | 3 |
| US Billboard 200 | 10 |
