= King of Hearts (Engelbert Humperdinck album) =

Studio album by Engelbert Humperdinck
- Released: 1973
- Label: Decca

Engelbert Humperdinck chronology
In Time (1972)	King of Hearts (1973)	My Love (1973)

King of Hearts is a studio album by British singer Engelbert Humperdinck, released in 1973 on Decca Records (on Parrot Records in the United States and Canada).

The album didn't chart in the UK.

== Track listing ==
Side 1
No.	Title	Writer(s)	Length
1.	"My Summer Song"	Stott	3:02
2.	"I'm Stone in Love With You"	Bell, Creed, Bell	3:11
3.	"Do I Love You"	Pelay, Le Govic, Dessca, Piolot, Anka	2:52
4.	"Somebody Waiting"	, Nichols, Williams	3:20
5.	"The Most Beautiful Girl"	Wilson, Sherrill, Bourke	3:09

Side 2
No.	Title	Writer(s)	Length
1.	"I'm Leavin' You"	Haddleston	2:37
2.	"Will You Be Here When I Wake Up In The Morning"	Unknown	3:09
3.	"Eternally"	Chaplin, Parsons, Turner	3:04
4.	"Only Your Love"	Ortolani, Rudge	3:04
5.	"That's What It's All About"	Scott, Dyer	3:09
6.	"Songs We Sang Together"	Macaulay	2:55

== Charts ==
Chart (1973)	Peak position
US Billboard 200	113
