= I'm a Better Man =

Single by Engelbert Humperdinck

from the album Engelbert Humperdinck
- B-side: "Café"
- Released: 1969
- Genre: Traditional pop
- Length: 2:50
- Label: Decca F.12957
- Songwriter(s): Bacharach & David
- Producer(s): Peter Sullivan

Engelbert Humperdinck singles chronology
"The Way It Used to Be" (1969)	"I'm a Better Man" (1969)	"Winter World of Love" (1970)

"I'm a Better Man" was written by Burt Bacharach and Hal David. It was a hit for Engelbert Humperdinck in 1969. It was a follow-up to the previous release, "The Way It Used To Be".

== Background ==
The record was released in the United States on Parrot 40040.

In the 1980s, the song ended up on an Engelbert compilation Release Me which included other songs such as "Release Me", "There Goes My Everything" and "The Last Waltz".

== Chart performance ==
On August 9, 1969, the record reached No. 15 on the UK Singles Chart.

On September 27, 1969, the record peaked at No. 38 on the Billboard Hot 100, and it spent a total of seven weeks on the chart. It also peaked at No. 6 on Billboard's Easy Listening chart.
