= Miracles (Engelbert Humperdinck album) =

Miracles by Engelbert Humperdinck

Studio album by Engelbert Humperdinck
- Released: 1977
- Label: Epic (US), EMI (UK)

Engelbert Humperdinck chronology
After the Lovin' (1976)	Miracles by Engelbert Humperdinck (1977)	Christmas Tyme (1977)

Professional ratings
Review scores
Source	Rating
AllMusic	2.5/5 stars

Miracles by Engelbert Humperdinck (or simply Miracles) is a studio album by British singer Engelbert Humperdinck, released in 1977 by Epic in the United States and by EMI in the UK.

== Track listing ==
Side 1
No.	Title	Writer(s)	Length
1.	"I Believe in Miracles"	B. Mason, L. Reed	3:26
2.	"Goodbye My Friend"	A. Bernstein, R. Adams	3:30
3.	"Look at Me"	A. Bernstein, R. Adams	3:03
4.	"From Me to You"	B. Eli, L. Philips	4:05
5.	"Without You"	H. David, G. Nissenson	3:04

Side 2
No.	Title	Writer(s)	Length
1.	"Loving You, Losing You"	T. Bell, L. Bell	4:14
2.	"Peace of Mind"	K. Gamble, L. Huff	3:08
3.	"What I Did for Love"	M. Hamlisch, E. Kleban	4:18
4.	"You Are There"	L. Weiss	3:42
5.	"Summer of My Life"	S. May	4:41
6.	"Put a Light in Your Window"	A. Bernstein, R. Adams	3:43

== Charts ==
Chart (1977)	Peak position
US Billboard 200	167
