= This Moment in Time =

Studio album by Engelbert
- Released: 1979
- Labels: Epic (US), Columbia/EMI (UK)

Engelbert chronology
Last of the Romantics (1978)	This Moment in Time (1979)	Love's Only Love (1980)

This Moment in Time is a studio album by British singer Engelbert, released in 1979 by Epic in the United States and by Columbia in the UK.

== Critical reception ==
Professional ratings
Review scores
Source	Rating
Gramophone	(unfavourable)

The British Gramophone magazine wrote in its review: "'This Moment in Time' is the dreadful cliché used for the title of Engelbert's new album [...]; he's dropped the 'Humperdinck', by the way. This is an unforunately inauspicious Columbia debut, however, with a selection of undistinguished songs indifferently sung to uninspired accompaniments. Did the old magic disappear with the name?"

== Track listing ==
LP – Epic JE 35791 (US), Columbia SCX 6611 / EMI 0C 062-62 505 (UK)

Side 1
No.	Title	Writer(s)	Length
1.	"This Moment in Time"	A. Bernstein, R. Adams	4:01
2.	"First Time in My Life"	A. Bernstein, R. Adams	3:13
3.	"You're Something Special"	D. Wells, M. Champion, P. Jerome	4:01
4.	"Maybe Tomorrow"	D. Everly, P. Everly	3:14
5.	"Can't Help Falling in Love"	G. Weiss, H. Peretti, L. Creatore	4:02

Side 2
No.	Title	Writer(s)	Length
1.	"Lovin' You Too Long"	S. Bella	3:54
2.	"A Much, Much Greater Love"	A. Bernstein, R. Adams	3:55
3.	"I Believe in You"	B. Cannon, G. Dunlap	3:07
4.	"You Know Me"	T. Romeo	4:13
5.	"Travelin' Boy"	P. Williams, R. Nichols	3:34

== Charts ==
Chart (1979)	Peak position
US Billboard 200	164

== "This Moment in Time" (song) ==
The title song was released as a single (Epic 8-50632, coupled with "And the Day Begins").

It spent two weeks at number one on the Billboard Easy Listening (later known as "Adult Contemporary") chart and peaked at number 58 on the Billboard Hot 100 pop chart and at number 93 on the Billboard country chart.
