= Engelbert (album) =

Studio album by Engelbert Humperdinck
- Released: Early 1969
- Recorded: 1968; 1969
- Genre: Vocal pop
- Length: 34 minutes 22 seconds
- Label: Decca
- Producer: Peter Sullivan

Engelbert Humperdinck chronology
A Man Without Love (1968)	Engelbert (1969)	Engelbert Humperdinck (1969)

Professional ratings
Review scores
Source	Rating
AllMusic	3.5/5 stars

Engelbert is a studio album by British singer Engelbert Humperdinck, released in 1969 on Decca Records (on Parrot Records in the United States and Canada).

== Chart performance ==
The album spent eight weeks on the UK official albums chart, peaking for two consecutive weeks at number 3. In the United States the album debuted on the Billboard Top LPs in the issue dated March 22, 1969, peaking at number 12 during a thirty-three week run on the chart.

== Track listing ==
Side 1
No.	Title	Writer(s)	Length
1.	"Love Can Fly"	Blaikley	2:47
2.	"Love Was Here Before the Stars"	Bacharach, David	3:08
3.	"Don't Say No (Again)"	Testa, Mills, Fontana	3:08
4.	"Let Me into Your Life"	Hotlan, De Angelis	2:37
5.	"Through the Eyes of Love"	Clement, Addington	2:30
6.	"Les Bicyclettes de Belsize"	Mason, Reed	3:10

Side 2
No.	Title	Writer(s)	Length
1.	"The Way It Used to Be"	Cook, Greenaway, Conti, Cassano, Argenio	3:09
2.	"Marry Me"	Mason, Reed	2:48
3.	"To Get to You"	Chapel	2:30
4.	"You're Easy to Love"	Burgess	2:03
5.	"True"	Shayne, Ahlert	3:23
6.	"A Good Thing Going"	Humperdinck	2:20

== Personnel ==
All credits are adapted from the liner notes of Engelbert.

- Producer: Peter Sullivan (for Gordon Mills productions)
- Music Directors: Mike Vickers; Les Reed; Sydney Dale; Charles Blackwell
- Recording engineer: Bill Price
- Cover photography: Grace Waring
- Sleeve design: Decca Publicity Art Department
- Vocals: Engelbert Humperdinck

== Charts ==
Chart peaks for Engelbert
Chart (1969)	Peak position
UK Albums (Official Charts)	3
US Billboard Top LPs	12
