= Lesbian Seagull =

1979 song by Tom Wilson Weinberg, popularized by Engelbert Humperdinck in 1996

"Love Rollercoaster" / "Lesbian Seagull"

Single by Red Hot Chili Peppers and Engelbert Humperdinck

from the album Beavis and Butt-Head Do America: Original Motion Picture Soundtrack
- Released: January 1997
- Length: 3:52
- Songwriter: Tom Wilson Weinberg

"Lesbian Seagull" is a song originally released on the 1979 Tom Wilson Weinberg album The Gay Name Game. It gained further fame when it was recorded by Engelbert Humperdinck for the soundtrack of the 1996 MTV/Paramount film Beavis and Butt-Head Do America.

== History ==
Weinberg wrote the words and music, and released the song on his 1979 album The Gay Name Game. He wrote "Lesbian Seagull" in response to a UC Irvine study of long term monogamous lesbian behaviour in seagulls on Santa Barbara Island. Mike Judge, creator-designer of Beavis and Butt-Head, heard the song in a David Letterman "Dave's Record Collection" segment, and contacted Weinberg about the possibility of using it. In the film, the song is sung by David Van Driessen (one of Beavis and Butt-head's teachers, voiced by Judge). Humperdinck's version, used in the end credits of the film and included on the soundtrack released on the Universal / Geffen Records label, was released as a double-A-sided single with the Red Hot Chili Peppers' cover of the Ohio Players' "Love Rollercoaster", which was also released as a single in its own right.

The song was later used on The Scott Mills Show on BBC Radio 1, following Humperdinck's participation for the United Kingdom in the 2012 Eurovision Song Contest.

The song's most recent notable use has been as the outro to the popular radio show "Morning Glory with Matty Johns" on SEN Track. Matthew Johns has partially credited the show's success to the song and to Engelbert Humperdinck.

== Charts ==
The chart positions are for the double-A-sided single "Love Rollercoaster"/"Lesbian Seagull".

=== Weekly charts ===
Chart (1997)	Peak position
Australia (ARIA)	19
New Zealand (Recorded Music NZ)	35

=== Year-end charts ===
Chart (1997)	Peak position
Australia (ARIA Top Singles)	83
