= Last of the Romantics =

Studio album by Engelbert Humperdinck
- Released: 1978
- Genre: Pop
- Label: Epic (US), EMI (UK)
- Producer: Charlie Calello; tracks 3 and 8 co-produced by Joel Diamond

Engelbert Humperdinck chronology
Christmas Tyme (1977)	Last of the Romantics (1978)	This Moment in Time (1979)

Professional ratings
Review scores
Source	Rating
AllMusic	4/5 stars

Last of the Romantics is a studio album by British singer Engelbert Humperdinck, released in 1978 by Epic in the United States and by EMI in the UK.

== Track listing ==
Side 1
No.	Title	Writer(s)	Length
1.	"The Last of the Romantics"	Rupert Holmes	4:29
2.	"Just the Way You Are"	B. Joel	4:45
3.	"Love Me Tender"	Elvis Presley, V. Matson	4:01
4.	"You Light Up My Life"	J. Brooks	3:24
5.	"What You See Is Who I Am"	Buddy Kaye, D. Pomeranz	4:25

Side 2
No.	Title	Writer(s)	Length
1.	"Love's in Need of Love Today"	Stevie Wonder	4:17
2.	"When I Wanted You"	J. Cunico	4:04
3.	"Sweet Marjorene"	A. Capitanelli, R. O'Connor	2:59
4.	"This Time One Year Ago"	Carole Bayer Sager, Marvin Hamlisch	3:26
5.	"Love Is All"	B. Mason, L. Reed	4:19
