= Beavis and Butt-Head Do America =

1996 film by Mike Judge

- Theatrical release poster
- Directed by: Mike Judge
- Written by: Mike Judge; Joe Stillman
- Based on: Beavis and Butt-Head by Mike Judge
- Produced by: Abby Terkuhle; Mike Judge (Note: Uncredited)
- Starring: Mike Judge; Demi Moore; Bruce Willis; Robert Stack; Cloris Leachman
- Edited by: Gunter Glinka; Terry Kelley; Neil Lawrence
- Music by: John Frizzell
- Production companies: MTV Animation; MTV Productions; Geffen Pictures
- Distributed by: Paramount Pictures
- Release dates: December 15, 1996 (Mann's Chinese Theater); December 20, 1996 (United States)
- Running time: 81 minutes
- Country: United States
- Language: English
- Budget: $12 million
- Box office: $63.1 million

Beavis and Butt-Head Do America is a 1996 American adult animated road comedy film based on the MTV animated television series Beavis and Butt-Head. The film was co-written and directed by series creator Mike Judge, who also reprises his roles from the series; Demi Moore, Bruce Willis, Robert Stack and Cloris Leachman star in supporting roles. The film follows Beavis and Butt-Head, two teen slackers who travel the US in search of their stolen television and unknowingly become fugitives.

Previous offers by MTV to adapt Beavis and Butt-Head to film were rejected by Judge, before he eventually agreed to the film in 1994. As production began, the series' staff halted production while Judge wrote the screenplay with Joe Stillman. John Frizzell composed the film's score.

Beavis and Butt-Head Do America premiered at Mann's Chinese Theater on December 15, 1996, and was released in the United States on December 20, 1996, by Paramount Pictures. The film was a critical and commercial success, with critics praising the story and humor, and grossing $63.1 million in the United States and becoming the largest December box office opening of all time until it was surpassed the following year by Scream 2, and was the second highest-grossing animated film of 1996, behind Disney's The Hunchback of Notre Dame (which also starred Moore). A sequel, Beavis and Butt-Head Do the Universe, was released in 2022.

== Plot ==
Beavis and Butt-Head discover that their television has been stolen and set out to find it. After several failed attempts to obtain one, they come across a motel that offers one in every room. They meet Muddy Grimes, who thinks they're hired hitmen and offers them $10,000 to "do" his wife Dallas in Las Vegas. Thinking that "do" means have sex, Butt-Head convinces Beavis that they can finally "score" and buy a new TV.

Muddy drives the boys to the airport. In Las Vegas, Beavis and Butt-Head arrive at their hotel room, but Dallas catches them eavesdropping and holds them at gunpoint. The boys refuse Dallas's offer of $20,000 to "do" Muddy and argue over who will "do" Dallas first. Realizing that Beavis and Butt-Head have misunderstood their instructions, she plants the X-5 unit, a stolen biological weapon, in Beavis's shorts. She tells them to meet her at the U.S. Capitol.

Beavis and Butt-Head board a tour bus. After they accidentally sabotage the Hoover Dam, Agent Flemming of the ATF becomes convinced that they are criminal masterminds and places them on the FBI's most-wanted list. At Yellowstone National Park, Beavis and Butt-Head accidentally board a bus full of nuns who are repulsed by the boys and abandon them in Petrified Forest National Park. After walking through the desert, the boys meet two former Mötley Crüe roadies, unaware that they are their biological fathers.

Muddy returns to the motel, meets the real hitmen, and angrily swears to track down and kill Beavis, Butt-Head, and Dallas. The hitmen, who stole Beavis and Butt-Head's TV, abandon it in front of the motel. Beavis and Butt-Head awaken to find the drifters gone and continue walking until they become dehydrated and weak, they start to see their lives flash before their eyes, with Butthead reminiscing on him and Beavis growing up together while Beavis sees himself as a sperm cell going inside an ovum. While suffering dehydration, Beavis takes a bite out of a peyote cactus, causing him to have hallucinations.

Muddy finds Beavis and Butt-Head. After learning that Dallas intends to meet them, he puts them in his trunk and drives on. In Virginia, they jump out onto the interstate and cause a 400-car pileup. They walk past the scene and get back on the tour bus, stopping at the Capitol before reaching the White House. Muddy captures Dallas in a parking garage before she can meet Beavis and Butt-Head, but she is able to distract him with seduction and they have sex in his car, resulting in them being found and arrested by the ATF.

The ATF is dispatched to the White House because Beavis and Butt-Head are there on the same day as a peace conference. Beavis turns into his alter-ego Cornholio after consuming caffeine and sugar. Wandering into the Oval Office, he picks up the red phone, causing a military alert. Meanwhile, Butt-Head attempts to seduce Chelsea Clinton, but is thrown out of her bedroom window before he is detained and cavity-searched by ATF officers.

Beavis goes to their neighbor Tom Anderson's travel trailer, where Anderson catches him masturbating and throws him out. The ATF, thinking Beavis has the X-5 Unit, are about to open fire when Anderson throws out Beavis's ripped shorts. The X-5 Unit then flies into Butt-Head's hand, and he casually gives it to Flemming, making Flemming and the ATF realize the boys are innocent. Anderson is falsely accused of trying to frame Beavis and Butt-Head for his own crime and is arrested along with Dallas and Muddy while his wife is taken for a cavity search. Flemming proclaims Beavis and Butt-Head heroes, and they meet President Bill Clinton, who makes them honorary ATF agents. Beavis and Butt-Head return to Highland, upset that they did not have sex or receive money, but they find their TV at the motel and walk into the sunset carrying it back home.

== Voice cast ==
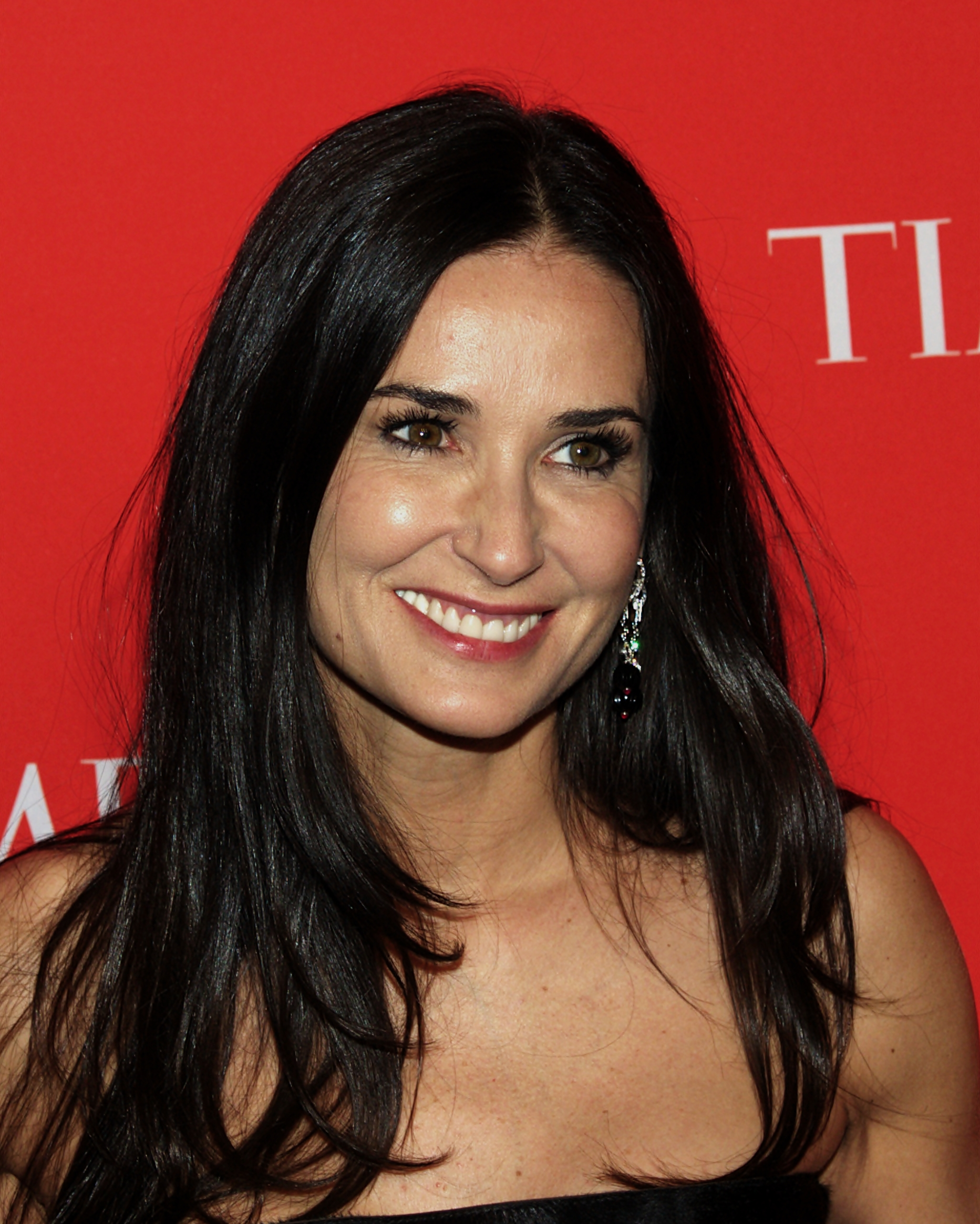
Demi Moore voices Dallas Grimes.

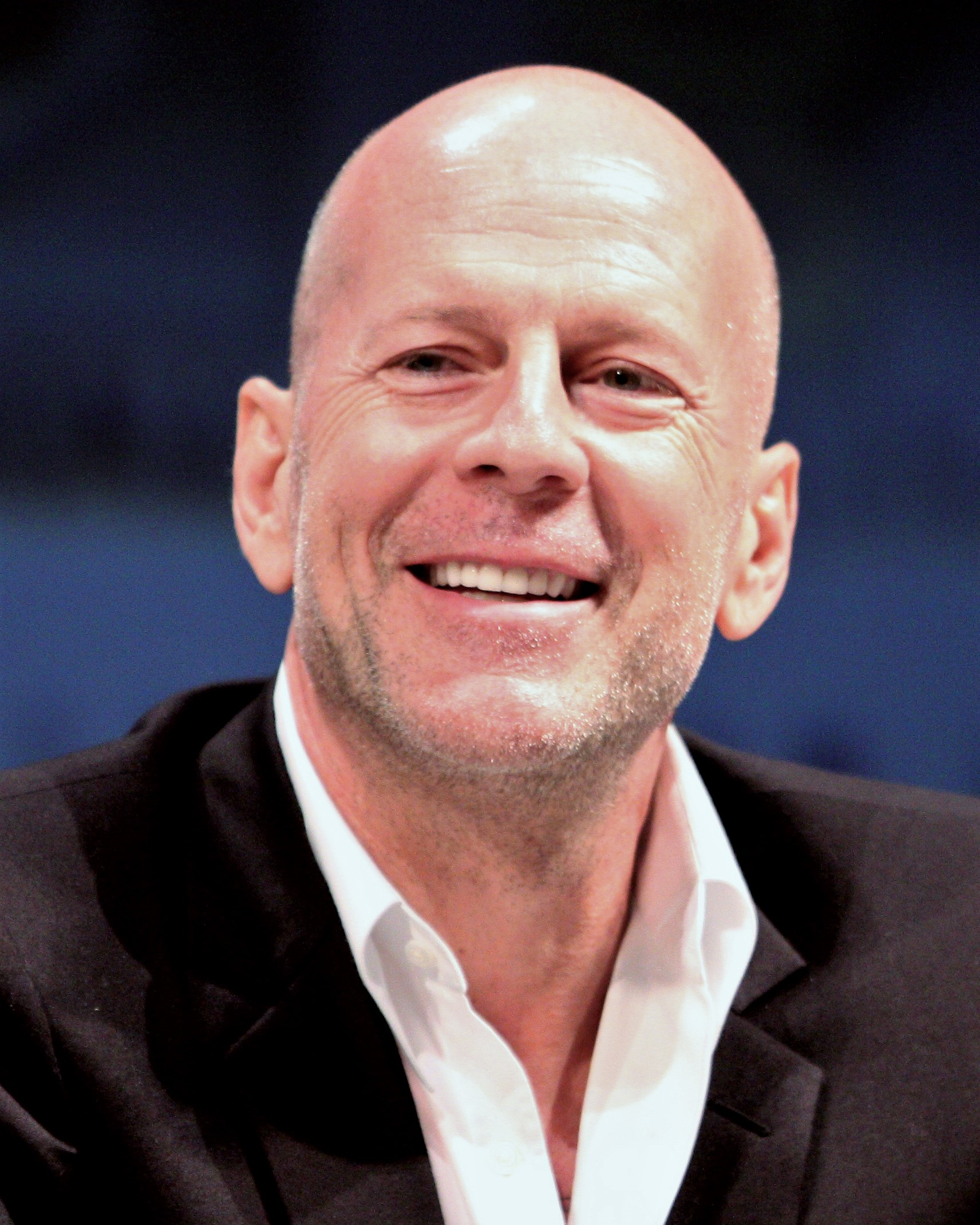
Bruce Willis voices Muddy Grimes.

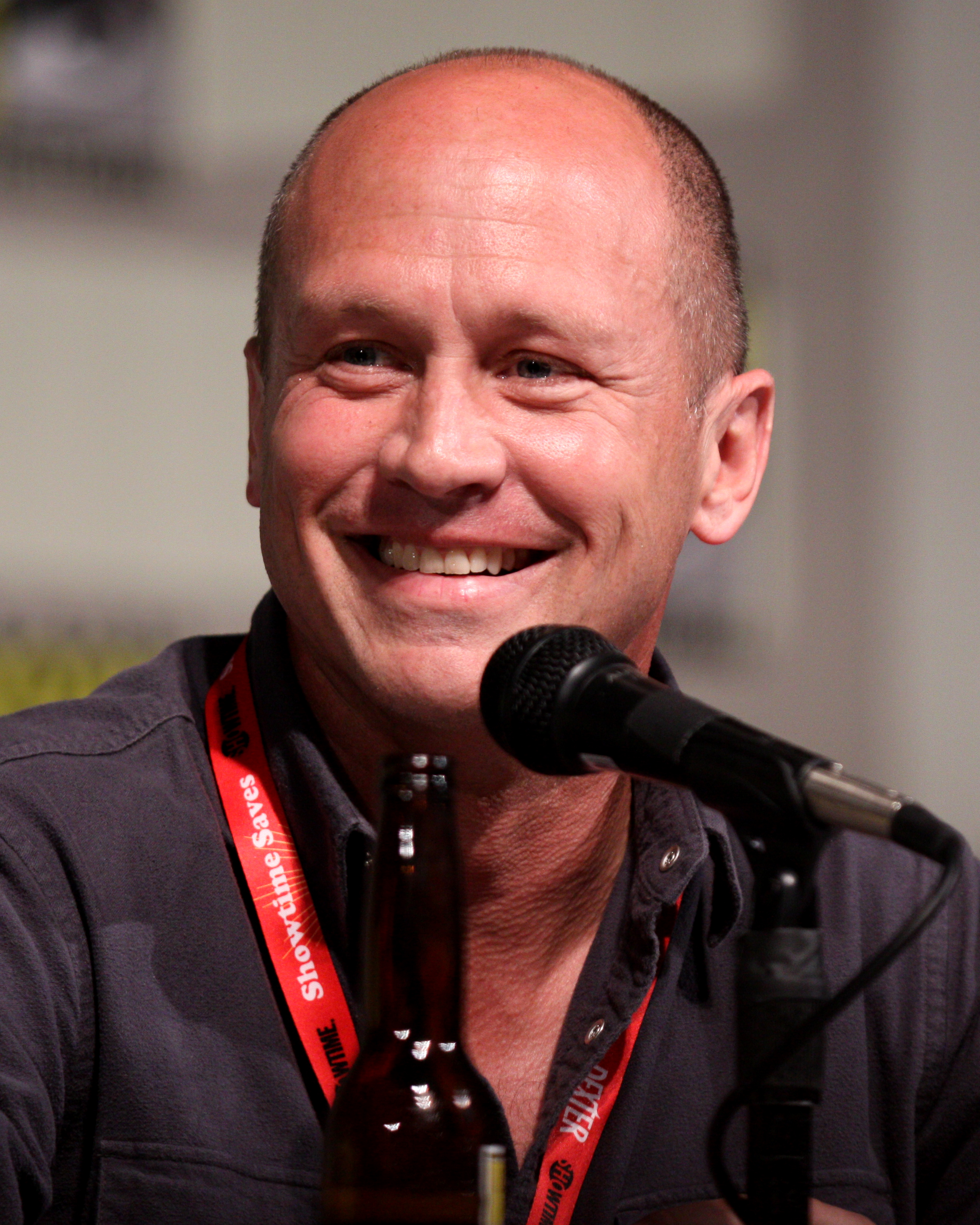
Mike Judge, the voice of Beavis and Butt-Head for TV, returned to work on the film.

- Mike Judge as Beavis, Butt-Head, Tom Anderson, Mr. Van Driessen, and Principal McVicker
- Bruce Willis as Muddy Grimes
- Demi Moore as Dallas Grimes
- Cloris Leachman as Martha the Old Woman
- Robert Stack as Agent Flemming

Pamela Blair, Toby Huss, John Doman, Tim Guinee, and Eric Bogosian provide additional voices. Lisa Collins has an uncredited role as Marcie Anderson, and Greg Kinnear has an uncredited role as ATF Agent Bork. David Letterman (credited as Earl Hofert) cameos as a Mötley Crüe roadie. Richard Linklater cameos as a tour bus driver.

== Production ==
Development began in 1993 as part of a production deal with MTV, David Geffen, and Warner Bros. Geffen so believed in the potential of the Beavis and Butt-head TV series that he suggested creating a film and record album based on the program. They originally conceived it in live-action, with Saturday Night Live regulars David Spade and Adam Sandler in mind to play the title characters. After MTV's parent company Viacom acquired Paramount Pictures's parent company Paramount Communications on July 7, 1994, the studio became a partner in the film, replacing Warner's interest in the project and dropping the live action concept under pressure from series creator Mike Judge. Judge has stated production of the animated film was very ad hoc and had some difficulties with progressing due to most of the staff's television background. The animation of the film was provided by Rough Draft Korea. The hallucination sequence's design and animation was based on the works of Rob Zombie. The sequence's director was Chris Prynoski.

=== Deleted scene ===
When the film premiered on MTV on August 7, 1999, an additional deleted scene followed the airing: while visiting the National Archives, Beavis attempts to use the restroom, but cannot because of the lack of toilet paper in the stall. Coincidentally, Butt-head is angry because the urinals lack the automatic flushing mechanisms that had amazed him at Yellowstone National Park. After the rest of their tour group finishes looking at the encased Declaration of Independence, Beavis sneaks out, breaks the glass with the U.S. flag pole, and steals it to use as "T.P. for his bunghole." While Archive guards rush to see what happened, Beavis cleans up, and exits the stall with a piece of the Declaration, containing John Hancock's signature, stuck to his shoe. The scene does not appear on the DVD, although it is mentioned on the commentary track. In the track, Judge noted that the scene did not test well.

A deleted scene showing Chelsea Clinton packing up to leave the White House was also shot as an alternative to the scene in the film depicting Butt-Head meeting Chelsea in her bedroom, in the event that Bill Clinton should lose his 1996 reelection bid to Bob Dole; however, by the spring of 1996, Judge chose to keep the original scene, feeling confident that Clinton would win his reelection bid against Dole — which he ultimately did that November.

== Soundtrack ==
Beavis and Butt-Head Do America: Original Motion Picture Soundtrack

Soundtrack album by various artists
- Released: November 5, 1996
- Recorded: 1995–96
- Genres: Heavy metal; alternative rock; punk rock; hip hop
- Length: 49:00
- Label: Geffen
- Producers: Mike Judge (exec.); Butthole Surfers; Isaac Hayes; Jerome Evans; John Frizzell; Lars Frederiksen; Mark Williams; Moby; No Doubt; Rashad Smith; Red Hot Chili Peppers; Southern Culture on the Skids; Sylvia Massy; Terry Date; Tim Armstrong; Ulrich Wild; Vanda & Young; White Zombie

Singles from Beavis and Butt-Head Do America: Original Motion Picture Soundtrack
- 1. "Love Rollercoaster / Lesbian Seagull" Released: January 12, 1997; 2. "Ain't Nobody" Released: January 27, 1997

Professional ratings
Review scores
Source	Rating
AllMusic	link
Entertainment Weekly	C link

Beavis and Butt-Head Do America: Original Motion Picture Soundtrack
No.	Title	Writer(s)	Producer(s)	Length
1.	"Two Cool Guys (Theme from Beavis and Butt-Head Do America)" (Isaac Hayes)	Hayes; Mike Judge	Hayes; Ron Christopher (co.); Mike Judge (co.); Mark Kates (co.)	3:06
2.	"Love Rollercoaster" (Red Hot Chili Peppers)	James Williams; Clarence Satchell; Leroy Bonner; Marshall Jones; Ralph Middlebrooks; Marvin Pierce; William Beck	Sylvia Massy; Red Hot Chili Peppers	4:37
3.	"Ain't Nobody" (LL Cool J)	Hawk Wolinski; James Todd Smith (additional lyrics)	Rashad Smith	4:37
4.	"Ratfinks, Suicide Tanks and Cannibal Girls" (White Zombie)	Rob Zombie; Jay Yuenger; Sean Yseult; John Tempesta; Charlie Clouser	Terry Date; Ulrich Wild; White Zombie	3:52
5.	"I Wanna Riot" (Rancid with Stubborn All-Stars)	Tim Armstrong; Matt Freeman; Lars Frederiksen	Tim Armstrong; Lars Frederiksen	3:59
6.	"Walk on Water" (Ozzy Osbourne)	Osborne; Jim Vallance	Moby	4:16
7.	"Snakes" (No Doubt)	Gwen Stefani; Tony Kanal	No Doubt	4:34
8.	"Pimp'n Ain't EZ" (Madd Head)	Jerry Lewis; Jakkell Brown; Jerome Evans	Jerome Evans	4:21
9.	"The Lord is a Monkey" (Rock Version) (Butthole Surfers)	Butthole Surfers	Paul Leary	4:44
10.	"White Trash" (Southern Culture on the Skids)	Rick Miller	Mark Williams; Southern Culture on the Skids	2:02
11.	"Gone Shootin'" (AC/DC)	Malcolm Young; Angus Young; Bon Scott	Vanda & Young	5:04
12.	"Lesbian Seagull" (Engelbert Humperdinck)	Tom Wilson Weinberg	John Frizzell	3:50

Noticeably missing are "Mucha Muchacha", the version of "Lesbian Seagull" with Mr. Van Driessen singing, and the score tracks performed by The London Metropolitan Orchestra, which were released on a separate album.

"Two Cool Guys", written and performed by soul/funk musician Isaac Hayes, is a semi-parody of Hayes' Academy Award-winning "Theme from Shaft". It incorporates the theme from the Beavis and Butt-head television series as a rhythm guitar line, and series creator Mike Judge, who wrote the theme, is given a co-writing credit with Hayes in the soundtrack liner notes. The opening credit sequence which the song features is a take-off on popular 1970s cop movies and TV shows with Beavis and Butt-Head as hip ace sleuth Lothario detectives.

The version of Ozzy Osbourne's "Walk on Water" is not the same version included in the film. The film used an earlier demo version, while the soundtrack itself contains a later, revised version. The original demo, which appears in the film, can be found on Osbourne's Prince of Darkness box set. Osbourne and co-writer Jim Vallance both prefer the demo version heard in the film. "Walk on Water" was released as a radio-single and peaked at number 28 on Billboard's Mainstream Rock Tracks chart due to airplay.

The use of AC/DC's "Gone Shootin'" is particularly fitting for the series, as Judge himself would eventually admit the guitar solo that serves as the show's theme was in fact the solo from the AC/DC song played backwards.

The soundtrack was re-released in 2016 on a special edition LP picture disc.

=== Certifications ===
Region	Certification	Certified units/sales
Canada (Music Canada)	Gold	50,000^{^}
United States (RIAA)	Gold	500,000^{^}
^{^} Shipments figures based on certification alone.

== Reception ==
=== Box office ===
Beavis and Butt-Head Do America earned $63.1 million at the domestic box office against a $12 million production budget.

Beavis and Butt-Head Do America opened at number 1 in North America on December 20, 1996 ahead of Jerry Maguire, 101 Dalmatians, Scream and One Fine Day, collecting $20.1 million in its opening weekend. This broke the record for the highest December opening weekend previously held by Star Trek VI: The Undiscovered Country. That record was surpassed a year later by Scream 2.

The film also held the record for the highest December opening weekend for an animated film until surpassed by The Princess and the Frog in 2009. It maintained the highest opening weekend for a PG-13-rated animated film until 2007 when The Simpsons Movie took it.

=== Critical reception ===
On the review aggregator website Rotten Tomatoes, 70% of 56 critics' reviews are positive. The website's consensus reads: "Beavis and Butt-Head Do America is unabashedly offensive, unapologetically stupid, and unexpectedly funny." Metacritic, which uses a weighted average, assigned the film a score of 64 out of 100, based on 16 critics, indicating "generally favorable" reviews. Audiences polled by CinemaScore gave the film an average grade of "B+" on an A+ to F scale.

Roger Ebert of Chicago Sun-Times praised the film as a "vulgar" satire on American youth, and compared it favorably to Wayne's World. On the film review show Siskel and Ebert, Ebert's reviewing partner Gene Siskel gave the film a "modest recommendation", having been taken with the two lead characters. Ebert and Siskel ultimately awarded it a "two thumbs up" rating. Ty Burr writing for Entertainment Weekly gave it a C+ saying it "turns from spoofing teenage dimness to merely embodying it." In a retrospective review in Jacobin for the film's 25th anniversary, writer Leonard Pierce praised Beavis and Butt-Head Do America for its continued relevancy into the 21st century. Pierce described the film as "the greatest satire of the twenty-first-century American security state," adding that "we wouldn't be talking about the film at all today if it wasn't still painfully funny, with a distinctly 2020s nervous energy and a rowdy, bubbling pace that never slows down." Pierce concluded that Beavis and Butt-Head Do America "seems far fresher today than anything Matt Stone and Trey Parker have done this century."

=== Accolades ===
Organization	Award	Awardee	Result	Ref.
BMI Film & TV Awards	BMI Film Music Award	John Frizzell	Won	
1997 MTV Movie Awards	Best On-Screen Duo	Beavis and Butt-Head	Nominated	
17th Golden Raspberry Awards	Worst New Star	Beavis and Butt-Head	Nominated	
17th Golden Raspberry Awards	Worst Screen Couple	Beavis and Butt-Head	Nominated	

== Home media ==
The film was released on VHS on June 10, 1997, and on DVD on November 23, 1999, by Paramount Home Entertainment. It was re-released on a Special Edition DVD on September 12, 2006.

The video went straight to number one in the official UK video charts on release of which it stayed at the number one spot for two weeks before moving to number two during its third week. The movie spent a total of 17 weeks on the official video charts in the UK.

The film was released on Blu-ray for the first time on December 7, 2021, by Paramount Home Entertainment, in commemoration of the film's 25th anniversary.

== Sequel ==
In the years following, many fans rumored the possibility of a sequel or follow-up to the film, tentatively titled Beavis and Butt-Head: The Sequel or Beavis and Butt-Head 2. On August 31, 2009, during the promotion of Extract, Judge said he would like to see Beavis and Butt-Head on the big screen again. In 2019, Judge revealed that he has "some ideas" for a new film, saying there might be potential for a live-action version of the show. In February 2021, it was announced that a new Beavis and Butt-Head movie was in production for Paramount+, with Mike Judge on board. Beavis and Butt-Head Do the Universe was released on June 23, 2022.

== See also ==
- List of films set in Las Vegas
- List of films featuring hallucinogens
