= Christmas Tyme =

Studio album by Engelbert Humperdinck
- Released: 1977
- Label: Epic (US), EMI (UK)

Engelbert Humperdinck chronology
Miracles (1977)	Christmas Tyme (1977)	Last of the Romantics (1977)

Professional ratings
Review scores
Source	Rating
AllMusic	4.5/5 stars

Christmas Tyme is a Christmas album by British singer Engelbert Humperdinck, released in late 1977 by Epic in the United States and by EMI in the UK.

== Track listing ==
Side 1
No.	Title	Writer(s)	Length
1.	"Silent Night"	F. Gruber, J. Mohr	4:40
2.	"White Christmas"	I. Berlin	3:53
3.	"A Night to Remember"	A. Bernstein, R. Adams a/k/a R. Ziegler	3:20
4.	"Silver Bells"	J. Livingston, R. Evans	2:48
5.	"Christmas Time Again"	Y. Barry	2:34
6.	"Christmas Song"	M. Torme, R. Wells	4:04

Side 2
No.	Title	Length
1.	"Sing-A-Long Tyme": "We Wish You A Merry Christmas" "Deck the Halls" "Rudolph the Red-Nosed Reindeer" "Santa Claus Is Coming to Town"	3:27
2.	"Carol Tyme": "Oh Come All Ye Faithful" "The First Noel" "It Came upon a Midnight Clear" "Hark the Herald Angels Sing" "Joy to the World" "We Three Kings" "Oh Holy Night"	6:47
3.	"Home Tyme": "(There's No Place like) Home for the Holidays" "There's No Christmas like a Home Christmas" "I'll Be Home for Christmas"	4:03
4.	"Jingle Bell Tyme": "Jingle Bell Rock" "Winter Wonderland" "Let It Snow, Let It Snow, Let It Snow" "Jingle Bells"	4:04

== Charts ==
Chart (1977)	Peak position
US Billboard 200	156
