= Les Bicyclettes de Belsize (song) =

Single by Engelbert Humperdinck
- B-side: "Three Little Words (I Love You)"
- Released: 1968
- Label: Decca
- Songwriters: Les Reed, Barry Mason
- Producer: Peter Sullivan

"Les Bicyclettes de Belsize" (translation: "The Bicycles of Belsize") is a song written and composed by Les Reed and Barry Mason. Used as the theme song of the 1968 eponymous musical film, it was mimed by Anthony May in the movie and sung by Johnny Worth. As a 7-inch 45 rpm single, it was a big hit that year, in parallel English and French versions, for Engelbert Humperdinck and Mireille Mathieu, respectively. The French version premiered on Mathieu's 1968 Columbia album Les Bicyclettes de Belsize; the English version premiered as a single in 1968, and was then included on Humperdinck's 1969 album Engelbert.

Despite the song's French title, it and the rest of the 30-minute film were written in English. The British short subject is a nominal parody of the French feature film Les Parapluies de Cherbourg, to the extent that one can even sing the words "les parapluies de Cherbourg" to the same music. Though it was produced in 1968, the film was released theatrically in 1969, prompting some to think it was inspired by the song.

== Notable releases ==
- Engelbert Humperdinck – "Les Bicyclettes de Belsize" / "Three Little Words (I Love You)" - Decca F.12834 - 1968
- Mireille Mathieu - Les Bicyclettes De Belsize/- 1968
- Nada - "Las bicicletas de Belsize" / Sony - 1969
- Alfredo – "Las bicicletas de Belsize" / Philips - 1969
- Waldo de los Rios – "Les Bicyclettes de Belsize" / Instrumental
- Nada Trio - "Les Bicyclettes de Belsize" / Olis music 1998
- Marco T – "Las Bicicletas de Belsize" / Tulsan producciones - 2016

== Charts ==
Chart (1968–69)	Peak position
Belgium (Ultratop 50 Flanders)	2
Belgium (Ultratop 50 Wallonia)	4
West Germany (GfK)	26
Ireland (IRMA)	3
Netherlands (Single Top 100)	18
New Zealand (Listener)	10
UK Singles (Official Charts)	5
US Billboard Hot 100	31
US Adult Contemporary (Billboard)	3
