= Too Beautiful to Last =

Single by Engelbert Humperdinck

from the album In Time
- B-side: "A Hundred Times A Day"
- Released: 1972
- Genre: Traditional pop
- Length: 3:06
- Label: Decca
- Songwriters: Richard Rodney Bennett & Paul Francis Webster

Engelbert Humperdinck singles chronology
"Another Time, Another Place" (1971)	"Too Beautiful to Last" (1972)	"In Time" (1972)

"Too Beautiful to Last" is a song recorded by Engelbert Humperdinck, which was the theme from the 1971 historical biopic Nicholas and Alexandra.

In 1972, the song was released on the album In Time and as a single. The song spent 10 weeks on the UK Singles Chart, peaking at No. 14, while reaching No. 1 in Hong Kong, No. 9 in South Africa, No. 17 on the Irish Singles Chart, and No. 66 on Canada's "RPM 100". In the United States, the song spent 3 weeks on the Billboard Hot 100 chart, peaking at No. 86, while reaching No. 16 on Billboard's Easy Listening chart.

== Chart performance ==
Chart (1972)	Peak position
UK Singles Chart	14
Hong Kong - Radio Hong Kong	1
South Africa - South African Record Distributors and Manufacturers	9
Ireland - Irish Singles Chart	17
Canada - RPM 100	66
US Billboard Hot 100	86
US Billboard - Easy Listening	16
