= Joel Diamond =

American music producer

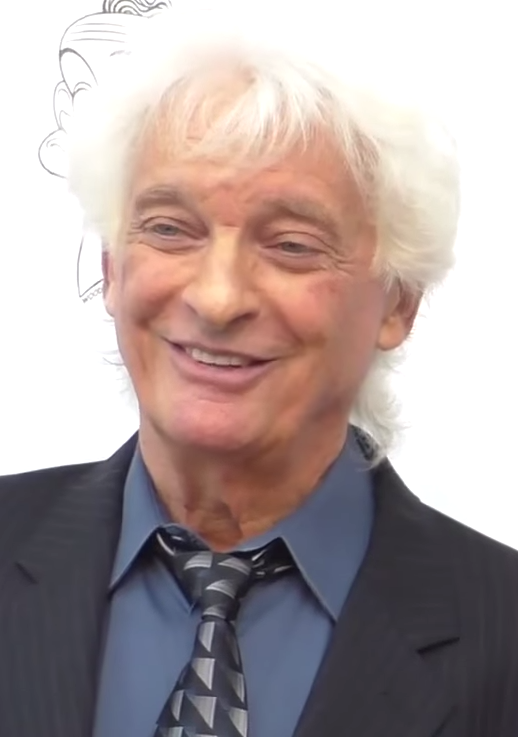
- Diamond at the Carney Awards in 2016
- Born: Passaic, New Jersey, U.S.
- Occupation: Record producer
- Spouse: Rebecca Holden (m. 2015, divorced 2023)

Joel Diamond is an American record producer. He has produced 36 gold and platinum recordings and had over 54 recordings on the Billboard charts.

Diamond grew up in Passaic, New Jersey, and graduated from Rider College (now Rider University), where he majored in business and psychology.

In 2024, Gloria Gaynor filed a lawsuit against Diamond claiming he owed her $2 million in royalties under a licensing agreement along with copyright infringement and fraud. Diamond denied the allegations.

On New Year's Eve 2014, he married actress Rebecca Holden. They were married for eight years, and divorced in 2023. In a 2025 press release, Diamond stated he was "enjoying his single bachelor lifestyle".
