= Engelbert Humperdinck (singer) =

British singer (born 1936)

Engelbert Humperdinck MBE
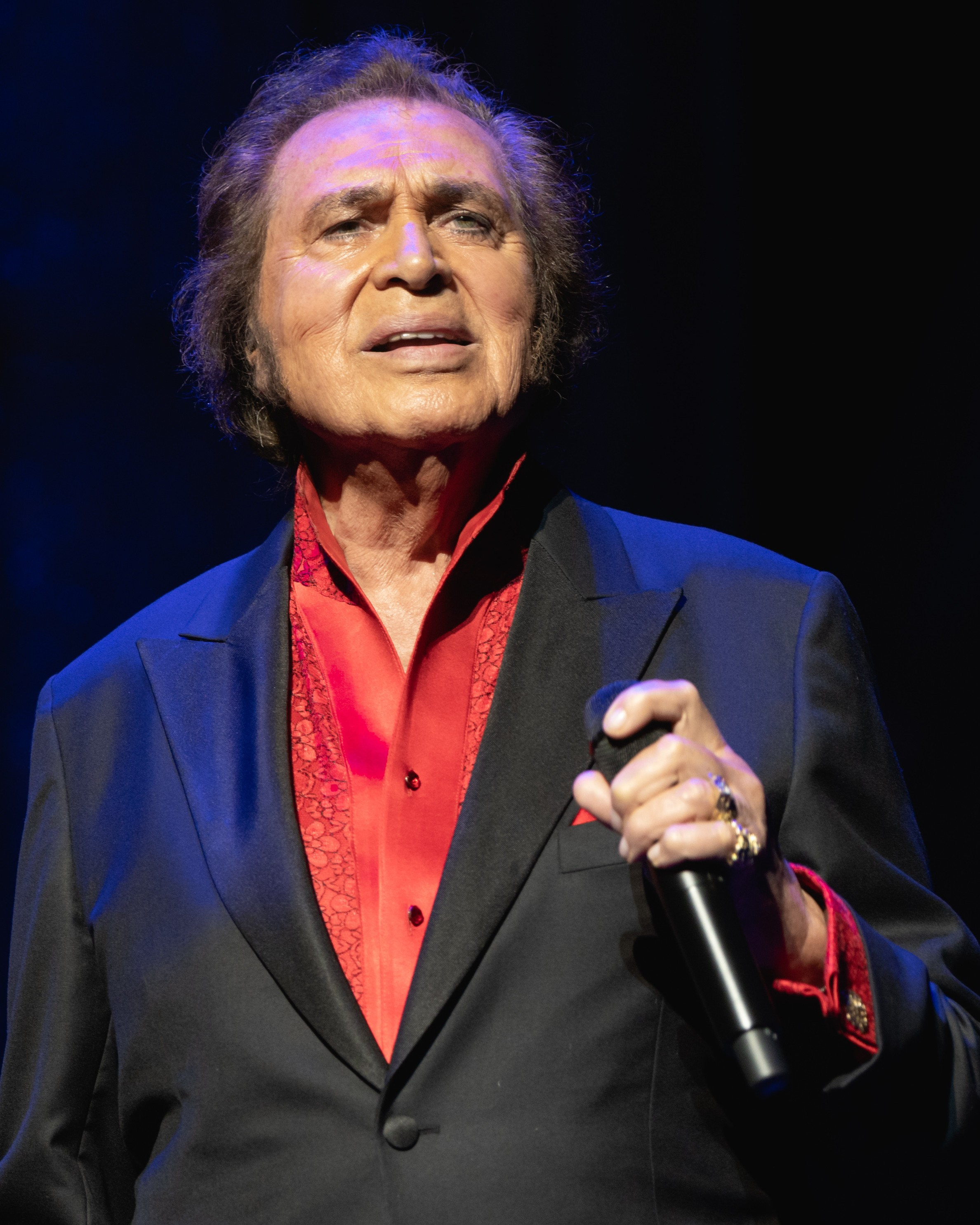
- Humperdinck performing at the London Palladium in 2022
- Born: Arnold George Dorsey; 2 May 1936 (age 90); Madras, Madras Presidency, British India
- Occupation: Singer
- Years active: 1956–present
- Spouse: Patricia Healey (m. 1964; died 2021)
- Children: 6
- Musical career
- Origin: Leicester, England
- Genres: Traditional pop; easy listening; schlager
- Instrument: Vocals
- Labels: Decca; Parrot; Epic; White; Ariola; OK! Good Records
- Website: engelbert.com

Arnold George Dorsey (born 2 May 1936), known professionally as Engelbert Humperdinck, is a British singer. He achieved international success in 1967 with his recording of "Release Me".

Humperdinck began his performing career in the late 1950s under the name "Gerry Dorsey", but found success after 1965 when he partnered with manager Gordon Mills, who advised him to adopt the name of German composer Engelbert Humperdinck as a stage name. His recordings of the ballads "Release Me" and "The Last Waltz" topped the UK singles chart in 1967, selling more than a million copies each. Humperdinck scored further major hits in rapid succession, including "There Goes My Everything" (1967), "Am I That Easy to Forget" (1968), and "A Man Without Love" (1968). He attained a large following, with some of his most devoted fans calling themselves "Humperdinckers". Two of his singles were among the best-selling of the 1960s in the UK.

During the 1970s Humperdinck had significant American chart successes with "After the Lovin'" (1976) and "This Moment in Time" (1979). He garnered a reputation as a concert performer, and received renewed attention during the 1990s lounge revival with his recordings of "Lesbian Seagull" for the soundtrack of Beavis and Butt-Head Do America (1996) and a dance album (1998). The new millennium brought a range of musical projects, including the Grammy-nominated gospel album Always Hear the Harmony: The Gospel Sessions (2003) and the double album of duets Engelbert Calling (2014). Humperdinck represented the United Kingdom at the Eurovision Song Contest 2012 in Baku, Azerbaijan, with the song "Love Will Set You Free", placing 25th out of 26. Humperdinck continues to record and tour, having sold more than 140 million records worldwide.

== Early life ==
Arnold Dorsey was born in 1936 in Madras (now Chennai), British India, one of 10 children born to British Army non-commissioned officer Mervyn Dorsey, who was of Irish descent, and his wife Olive who, according to the singer, was of German descent. His family moved to Leicester, England, when he was ten years old. He later showed an interest in music, and began learning how to play the saxophone. By the early 1950s he was playing saxophone in nightclubs, but he is believed not to have begun singing until he was in the later years of his adolescence. His impression of Jerry Lewis prompted friends to begin calling him "Gerry Dorsey", a name that he worked under for almost a decade before changing it to the moniker he would become famously known by.

Dorsey's attempt to launch his music career was interrupted by conscription into the British Army Royal Corps of Signals during the mid-1950s. After his discharge, he got his first chance to record in 1959 with Decca Records. He had been spotted when he won a talent contest in the Isle of Man the previous summer. Dorsey's first single "Crazy Bells" (b/w "Mister Music Man") was not a hit despite him plugging the songs on two appearances on the ITV teenage music show Oh Boy! in February and March 1959. He switched to Parlophone later that year but his first record for that label, "I'll Never Fall in Love Again" (b/w "Every Day Is a Wonderful Day"), was not successful either. Dorsey would return to record for Decca again, but almost a decade later and with very different results. Also during that same year, he became part of a touring show called "The Big Beat Show" with other pop singers of the time, including Billy Fury, Vince Eager, and Terry Dene. Further television appearances followed in 1959 on the ITV show "The Song Parade". A tour as a support to Adam Faith followed and he continued working the nightclubs. In June 1961, however, he was stricken with tuberculosis and spent nine months in hospital. He eventually recovered and returned to show business in 1962; but had to start all over again from scratch. Dorsey went back on the variety stage and to nightclub work, but with little success.

== Career ==
=== Changes and "Release Me" ===
In 1965, Dorsey teamed up with Gordon Mills, his former roommate while in Bayswater, London, who had become a music impresario and the manager of Tom Jones. Mills, aware that Dorsey had been struggling for several years to become successful in the music industry, suggested a change of name to the more arresting Engelbert Humperdinck, borrowed from the 19th-century German composer of operas such as Hansel and Gretel. The reason was simply the unusual sound of the name in English. Humperdinck enjoyed his first real success during July 1966 in Belgium, where he and four others represented Britain in the annual Knokke song contest, winning that year's prize. Three months later, in October 1966, he was on stage in Mechelen. He made a mark on the Belgian charts with "Dommage, Dommage", and an early music video was filmed with him in the harbour of Zeebrugge.

In the mid-1960s, Humperdinck visited German songwriter Bert Kaempfert at his house in Spain and was offered arrangements of three songs: "Spanish Eyes", "Strangers in the Night", and "Wonderland by Night". He returned to Britain where he recorded all three songs. He recognised the potential of "Strangers in the Night" and asked manager Gordon Mills whether it could be released as a single, but his request was refused, since the song had already been requested by Frank Sinatra. "Spanish Eyes" and "Wonderland by Night" would be included on the singer's 1968 LP A Man Without Love.

"A Man Without Love"
Audio sample from "A Man Without Love" (1968)

In early 1967, the changes paid off when Humperdinck's version of "Release Me" topped the charts in the United Kingdom and hit No. 4 on the US Billboard 100. Arranged by Charles Blackwell in an "orchestral country music" style, with Big Jim Sullivan and Jimmy Page as session musicians and a full chorus joining Humperdinck on the third refrain, the record kept the Beatles' "Strawberry Fields Forever"/"Penny Lane" from the top slot in the United Kingdom (for the first time since 1963). The B-side of "Release Me", "Ten Guitars", continues to be enormously popular in New Zealand. "Release Me" spent 56 weeks in the Top 50 in a continuous chart run, and was believed to have sold 85,000 copies a day at the height of its popularity. The song has remained at the core of Humperdinck's repertoire ever since. Humperdinck's easygoing style and good looks soon earned him a large following, particularly among women. His hardcore female fans called themselves "Humperdinckers". "Release Me" was succeeded by two more hit ballads: "There Goes My Everything" and "The Last Waltz", earning him a reputation as a crooner, a description which he disputed. As Humperdinck told Hollywood Reporter writer Rick Sherwood:

"[I]f you are not a crooner it's something you don't want to be called. No crooner has the range I have. I can hit notes a bank could not cash. What I am is a contemporary singer, a stylised performer."

In 1968, with a Variety Club of Great Britain award for Show Business Personality of 1967, Humperdinck reached No. 2 on the UK Singles Chart with "A Man Without Love". His album of the same name climbed to No. 3 on the UK Albums Chart. Another single, "Les Bicyclettes de Belsize", was a top 10 hit in the United Kingdom and reached the top 40 in the United States. By the end of the decade, Humperdinck's expanding roster of songs also included "Am I That Easy to Forget", "The Way It Used to Be", "I'm a Better Man (For Having Loved You)" (written by Burt Bacharach and Hal David) and "Winter World of Love". He supplemented these big-selling singles with a number of equally successful albums. These albums – Release Me, The Last Waltz, A Man Without Love, and Engelbert Humperdinck—formed the bedrock of his success. For two seasons in 1969–70, Humperdinck fronted his own television series The Engelbert Humperdinck Show for ATV in the United Kingdom, and ABC in the US. In this musical variety format, he was joined by, among others, Paul Anka, Shirley Bassey, Tony Bennett, Jack Benny, Milton Berle, Ray Charles, Four Tops, Lena Horne, Liberace, Lulu, Carmen McRae, Dusty Springfield, Jack Jones, Tom Jones and Dionne Warwick.

=== 1970s ===
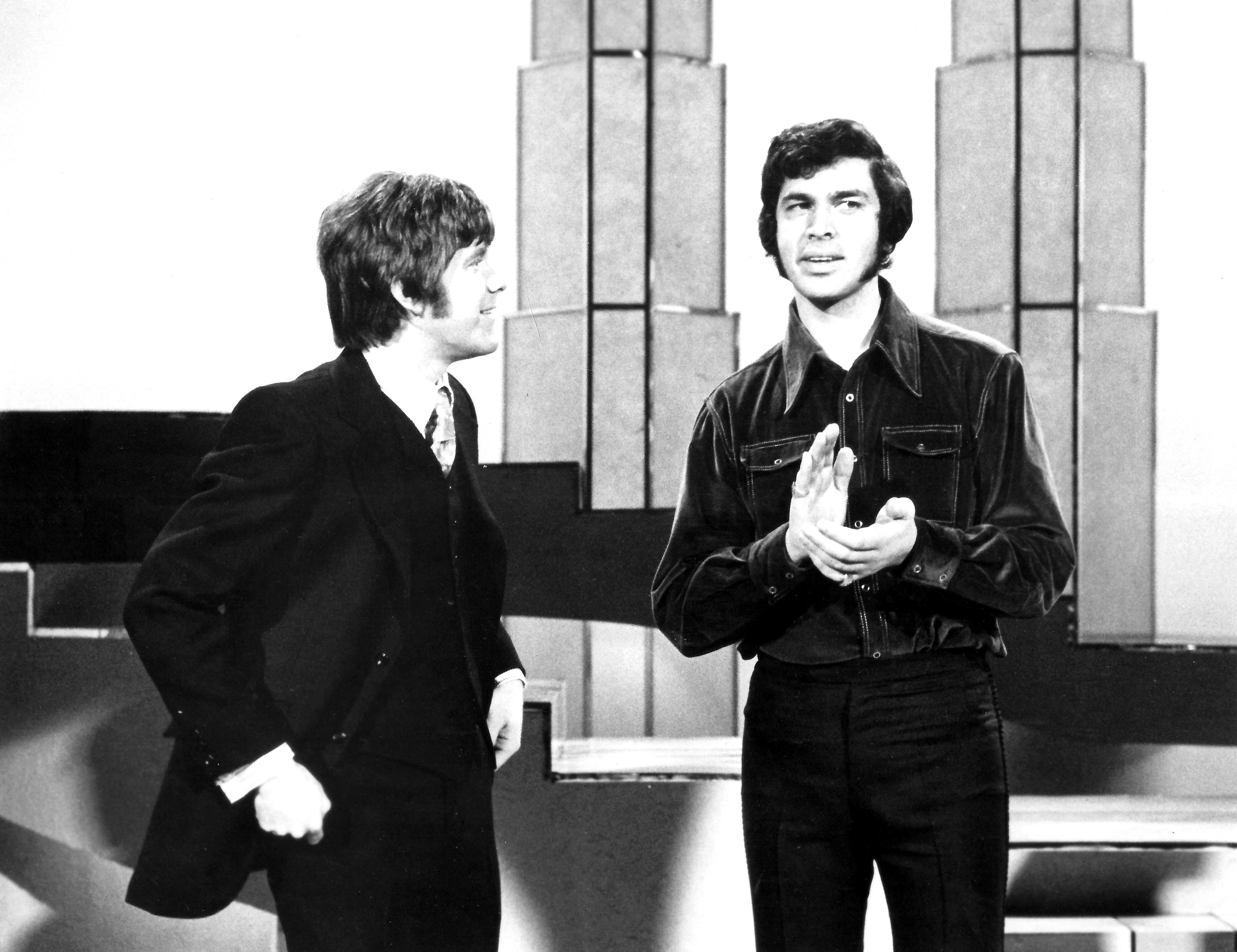
Humperdinck (right) and Oliver on The Engelbert Humperdinck Show in 1970

By the start of the 1970s, Humperdinck had settled into a busy schedule of recordings, and a number of signature songs emerged from this period, often written by noted musicians and songwriters; among them, "We Made It Happen" (written by Paul Anka), "Sweetheart" (written by Barry Gibb and Maurice Gibb), "Another Time, Another Place", and "Too Beautiful to Last" (theme from the film Nicholas and Alexandra). In 1972, he starred in another television series, for BBC1. Titled Engelbert with The Young Generation, the show ran for thirteen weeks, and featured the dance troupe, regular guests the Goodies and Marlene Charell, and international stars. Also in 1972, he was among the guests in David Winters' musical television special The Special London Bridge Special, starring Tom Jones, and Jennifer O'Neill.

By the middle of the decade, Humperdinck concentrated on selling albums and on live performances, with his style of balladry less popular on the singles charts. He developed lavish stage productions, making him a natural for Las Vegas and similar venues. He performed regularly at the Riviera Hotel in Las Vegas through the early and middle years of the decade, recording a live album at the venue with the Three Degrees as backing singers.

In 1976, Humperdinck's commercial credentials were buoyed by "After the Lovin'", a ballad produced by Joel Diamond and Charles Calello, and released by CBS subsidiary Epic. The song was a top 10 hit in the US went Gold, and won the "most played juke box record of the year" award. The album of the same name reached the top 20 on the US charts, was nominated for a Grammy Award, and was a Double Platinum hit for the singer. Three of the album tracks were produced by Bobby Eli and recorded at the Sigma Sound Studios in Philadelphia. As critics point out, the singer's unexpected foray into the "Philadelphia Sound" was successful, adding to the overall strength of the work. Rounding off the year, Humperdinck made his first appearance on The Tonight Show Starring Johnny Carson with a live performance of the hit single. Joel Diamond went on to produce a series of albums recorded by Humperdinck for Epic, including This Moment in Time from 1979 (the title song topped the US adult contemporary charts) and two Christmas albums. These albums also found the singer working with important musical arrangers like Charles Calello and Jimmie Haskell. In 1979, following his late-decade chart successes stateside, Humperdinck took his stage show to Broadway with appearances at the Minskoff Theatre.

=== 1980s and 1990s ===
In the 1980s, Humperdinck consolidated his discography, recording regularly and performing as many as 200 concerts a year while continuing with headlining appearances in Las Vegas at the Hilton Hotel (Westgate Las Vegas Resort & Casino). In the early and mid-1980s, he made a number of special appearances as an actor on popular television dramas of the time, including The Love Boat, Hotel and Fantasy Island.

Following his stint as a recording artist with Epic, Humperdinck released what William Ruhlmann has called an "ambitious double album" titled A Lovely Way to Spend An Evening (1985). Ruhlmann commends Humperdinck for recording this album of standards from the American Songbook; he notes that the work "was a long time coming", while acknowledging that "the album deserved a broader distribution than it received." The album was released in the United Kingdom as Getting Sentimental and reached the UK Top-40 album charts in the summer of 1985.

In the following years, Humperdinck continued with studio recordings, including a duet with Gloria Gaynor for his album Remember, I Love You (1987). In the latter half of the 1980s, with new material like the song "Portofino" (1985), Humperdinck also focused on recordings influenced by European popular music of the time, particularly German popular music. Albums of this period include Träumen Mit Engelbert (1986) and Step into My Life (1989). Released as Ich Denk An Dich in Germany, Step into My Life included songs composed by Dieter Bohlen and Barry Mason, while the title song was co-written by Humperdinck himself. It spawned several singles, and a cover of Bohlen's hit song, "You're My Heart, You're My Soul". Remember, I Love You and Träumen mit Engelbert were certified Platinum sellers and Ich Denk An Dich was a certified Gold seller in Germany.

Humperdinck was awarded a star on the Hollywood Walk of Fame in 1989 and won a Golden Globe Award as entertainer of the year, while also beginning major involvement in charitable causes such as the Leukemia Research Fund, the American Red Cross, the American Lung Association, and several AIDS relief organisations. He wrote a song for one charity-group titled "Reach Out" (released on his 1992 studio album Hello Out There).

Musical appraisals of Humperdinck's career in the 1990s point to him earning "a new hip cachet" during the Lounge Revival, and note the success of new artistic ventures such as his recording of "Lesbian Seagull" for the soundtrack of the film Beavis and Butt-head Do America (1996), and his dance album from 1998. 1995's Love Unchained, produced by Bebu Silvetti, peaked in the UK Top-20 album charts, marking a return to form in his home country. He retained a public profile during these years, making numerous appearances on radio and television, including the Late Show with David Letterman and The Howard Stern Show, and at events such as the 1996 Daytona 500, where he performed "The Star-Spangled Banner".

=== 2000s ===
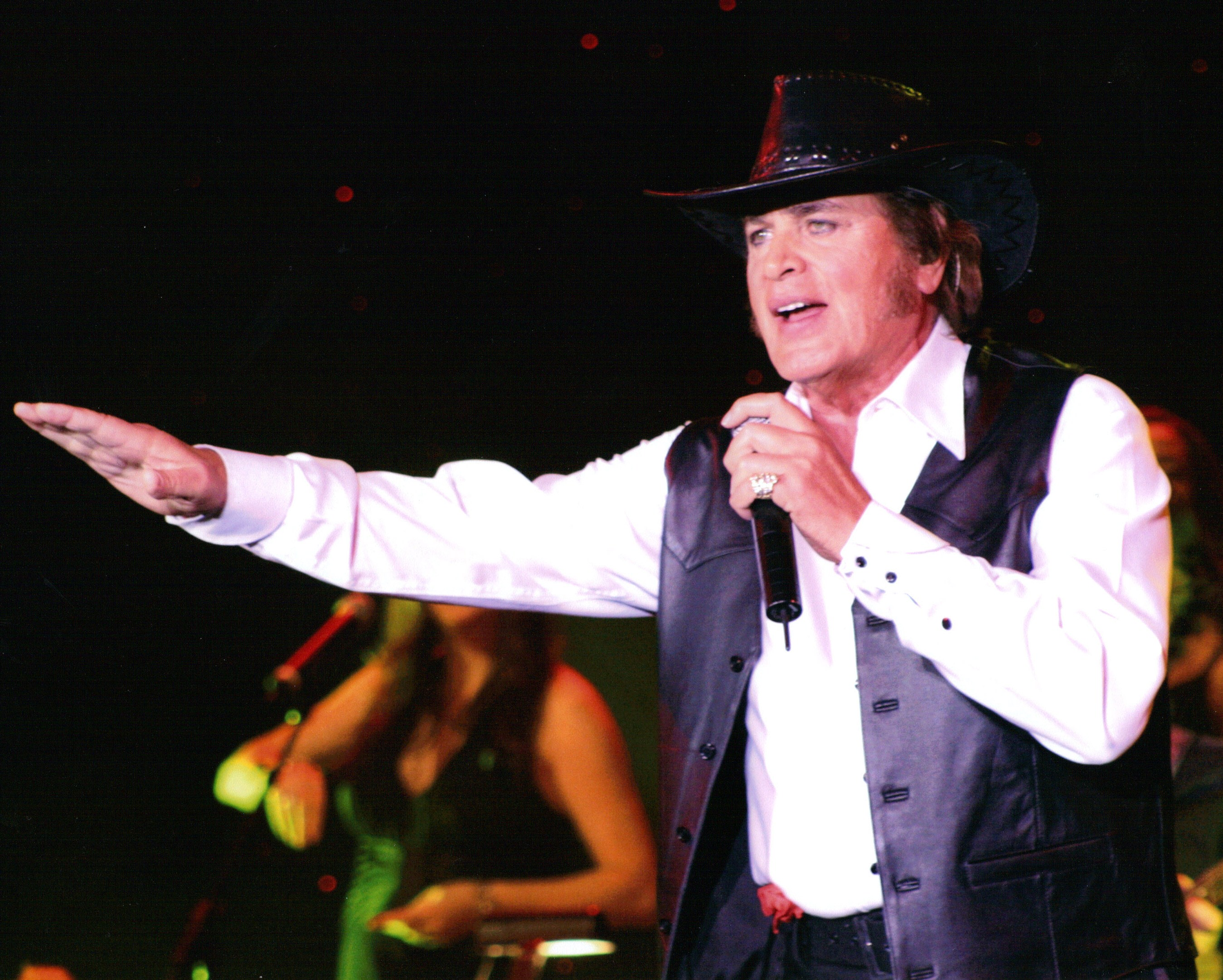
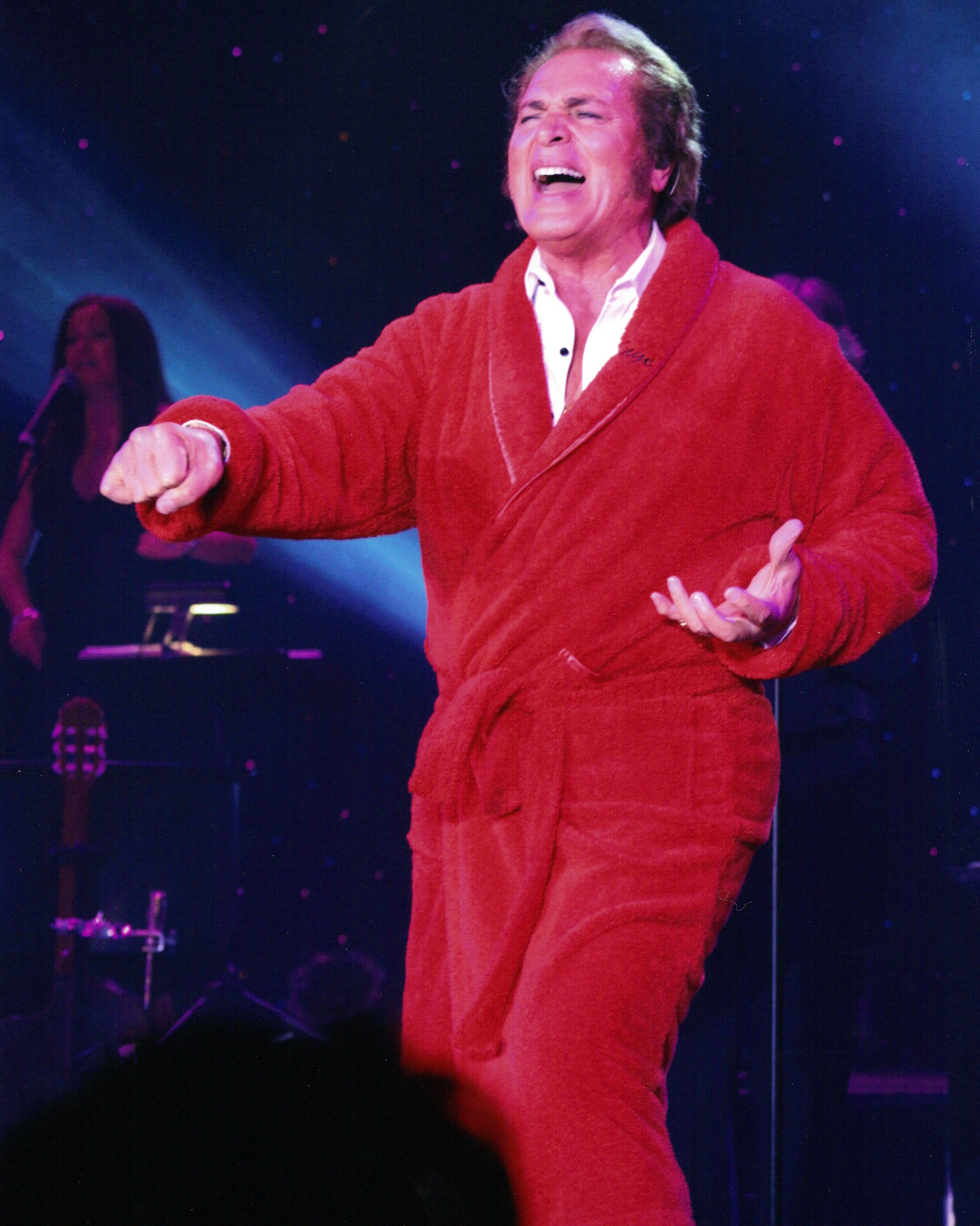
Humperdinck performing in 2008

Humperdinck's recording career continued into the new millennium, with a range of musical collaborations. In 2000, he hit the top five of the British album charts with Engelbert at His Very Best, and returned to the top five four years later, after he appeared in a John Smith's TV-advertisement. In the spring of 2003, Humperdinck collaborated with American artist-producer Art Greenhaw to record the roots gospel album Always Hear the Harmony: The Gospel Sessions; joining Humperdinck on the album were the Light Crust Doughboys, the Jordanaires and the Blackwood Brothers. The critically acclaimed album was nominated for a Grammy for "Best Southern, Country or Bluegrass Gospel Album of the Year", while Humperdinck was photographed with generations of fans at the 2004 Grammy Awards in Los Angeles. He was back in the studio soon after, releasing Let There Be Love in 2005. Music critics have remarked on the historical span of material in the album, from songs first made popular in the 1920s to more recent ones from the 1990s, and point especially to Humperdinck's version of Nick Lowe's "You Inspire Me" as a noteworthy cut. In 2007, Humperdinck released The Winding Road. In a conversation with Larry King, Humperdinck discussed the genesis of the album; he pointed out that The Winding Road featured songs exclusively by British composers, as a "tribute to [his] home country", released as it was to mark 40 years since his first international hit recording.

During the recording of the Gorillaz album Plastic Beach, Humperdinck was asked by Damon Albarn to contribute to the album as a guest artist. Humperdinck's management at the time, however, declined the offer without Humperdinck's knowledge. Describing the event, Humperdinck stated that the missed opportunity was, "the most grievous sin ever committed", and that he would have gladly collaborated with Gorillaz. He added that he had since parted ways with his then-management, handing over duties to his son, Scott Dorsey. At the end of the interview, Humperdinck observed: "I'd really like to rekindle that suggestion again and bring it back. Hopefully they will ask me again. My son Scott will definitely say yes".

=== 2010s and 2020s ===
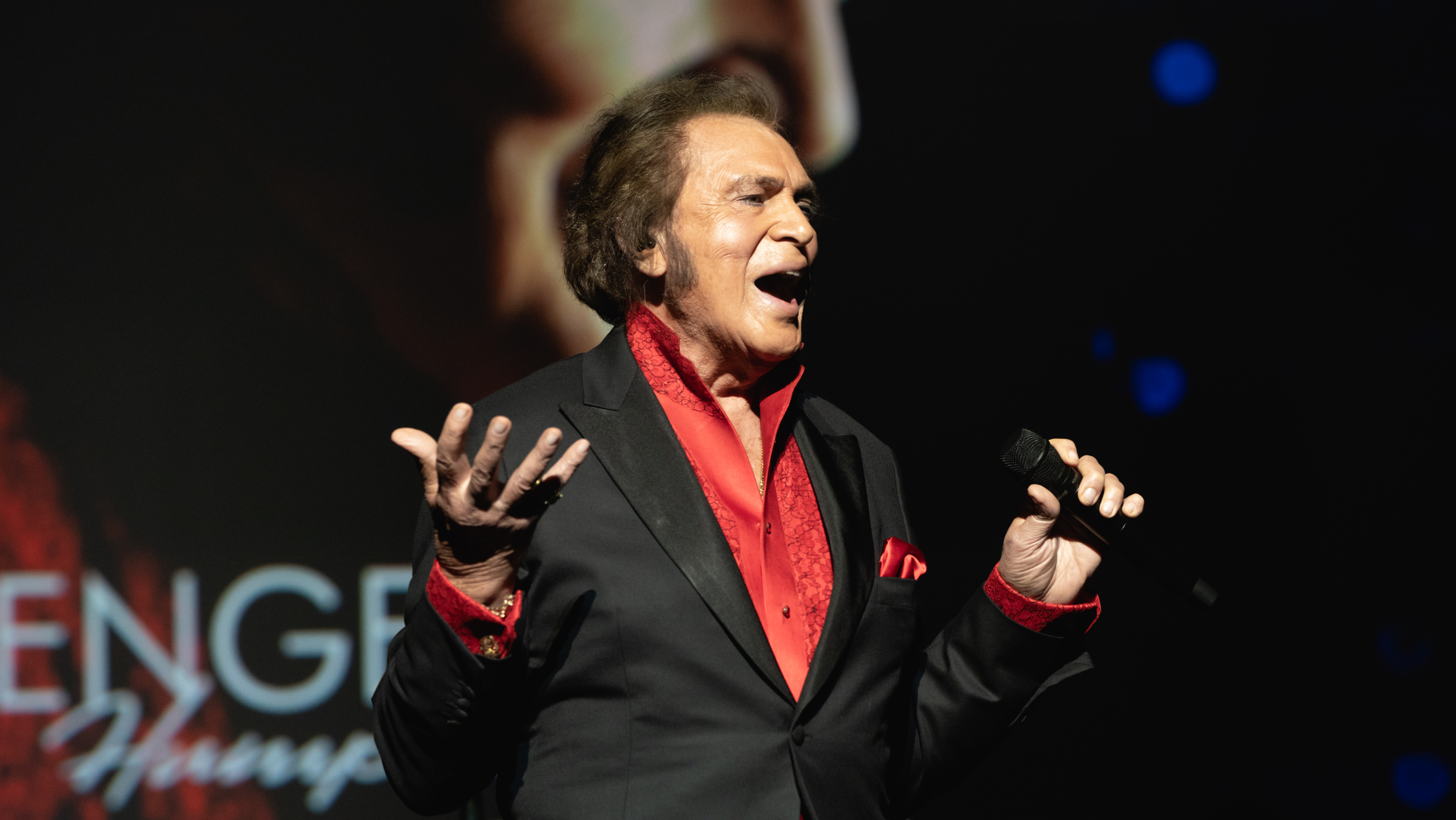
Humperdinck performing in 2022 at the London Palladium

In March 2012, the BBC announced that Humperdinck would represent the United Kingdom in the final of the Eurovision Song Contest 2012, to be staged in Baku, Azerbaijan, on 26 May. The song, "Love Will Set You Free" was unveiled on 19 March 2012, produced by music producer Martin Terefe and co-written by Sacha Skarbek. The song was recorded in London, Los Angeles and Nashville, Tennessee, and was mixed by Thomas Juth in London. When Humperdinck's participation was announced, he was set to become the oldest singer to ever participate in the contest at the age of 76. He was however overtaken in the same year when the Buranovskiye Babushki performed later on that night. During the final allocation draw, the United Kingdom was drawn to perform first. Humperdinck eventually finished in 25th place out of 26, coming in second to last in the voting, with 12 points.

With a rapid series of recordings, Humperdinck showed no signs of slowing the pace of his work in the 2010s. A career-first double-CD of duets, Engelbert Calling, was released in the United Kingdom in March 2014 by Conehead Records, charting in the UK top 40. The album found the singer in the studio with musicians like Charles Aznavour, Elton John, Il Divo, Johnny Mathis, Lulu, Willie Nelson, Olivia Newton-John, Cliff Richard, Smokey Robinson, Kenny Rogers, Neil Sedaka, Ron Sexsmith, Gene Simmons and Dionne Warwick. Engelbert Calling was released in North America by OK! Good Records on 30 September 2014, with Humperdinck making a number of promotional appearances on radio and television, including an extended conversation with Caroline Modarressy-Tehrani on HuffPost Live. In the UK, Humperdinck showcased songs from the album in shows like Weekend Wogan for which he performed acoustic versions of "Make You Feel My Love" and "The Hungry Years". A special edition vinyl EP with four tracks from the album was released in May 2015. According to OK! Good Records, the EP was Humperdinck's first vinyl release after a gap of twenty-five years, "a limited-edition 7" vinyl record with a first pressing of 1,000 copies on transparent cloudy clear vinyl".

2017 was the 50th anniversary of Humperdinck's first international chart success, and two major celebratory disc sets were produced in the early summer. The first, Engelbert Humperdinck 50, was a two-disc album bringing together the singer's charting singles for Decca, other songs from different points in his career, two new studio recordings, and a new remix of "Release Me". The second was an extended box set of Humperdinck's first eleven albums, reissued by Decca Records, complete with original album artwork and new liner notes. Engelbert Humperdinck 50 was released in the United Kingdom in May 2017, and entered the UK Albums Chart at No. 5, indicating the singer's enduring popularity in his home country. The album was released in North America in June 2017.

The Man I Want to Be was released in late 2017. While composed largely of newly written material, the album included two notable covers: "Photograph" (Ed Sheeran), and "Just the Way You Are" (Bruno Mars). In 2018, the singer came out with a newly recorded Christmas album, Warmest Christmas Wishes. In May 2019, Humperdinck premiered a new song, "You", a self-described ode to motherhood written for him by British songwriters Jon Allen and Jake Fields. As a birthday gift to his wife, Patricia, Humperdinck appeared in a music video of "You", filmed on location at the Houdini Estate. The singer's record label announced the late-2019 release of an EP of songs titled Reflections. Humperdinck followed this up with further EPs in 2020 (Sentiments) and 2021 (Regards). A new studio album, All About Love, was released in 2023.

In early 2022, Humperdinck's song "A Man Without Love" was featured in the Marvel Studios series Moon Knight. Later, he performed a cover of the popular song "I'm Forever Blowing Bubbles" for the film Bullet Train.

Well into his sixth decade as an entertainer, Humperdinck continues with international concert dates. While touring North America on an annual basis, he has performed in a range of venues and events in Europe, Australia and the Far East. In 2009, Humperdinck performed at Carols in the Domain, a popular Christmas event held in Sydney. He returned to Australia for a number of concerts in November the following year, adding a new studio album, Released, to his discography. Humperdinck also regularly schedules performances in the United Kingdom. In May 2015, he appeared at the Bridgewater Hall, Manchester, the Symphony Hall, Birmingham and the Royal Albert Hall and at London's Theatre Royal, Drury Lane in November 2017. In 2019, Humperdinck performed in Singapore, Manila and Tokyo. In late 2021 and into 2022, the singer appeared in cities in the UK and Europe, including a return to the London Palladium. In December 2023, Humperdinck announced a "grand farewell tour" of Australia in May 2024, including a concert at the Sydney Opera House. Subsequently, the singer returned to international live performances, with The Celebration Tour of 2026 coinciding with his 90th birthday.

In August 2026, Humperdinck released the album Faithfully. The album features covers of classic rock songs from bands like KISS, Journey, The Beatles, and Ozzy Osbourne. A tour in support of the album will run from September through January 2027.

== Personal life ==
Lifelong Catholics, Humperdinck and Patricia Healey wed in 1964; the two first met at the Palais de Danse, a nightclub in Leicester. They had four children, and the family lived between homes in the UK and the US.

Humperdinck's wife once said that she could paper their bedroom with all of the paternity lawsuits filed against her husband. He was successfully sued for paternity by two women during the 1970s and 1980s. In 1988, Humperdinck filed a libel suit against the National Enquirer. The origin of the libelous statements was said to be Kathy Jetter, the mother of one of Humperdinck's illegitimate children, and were made in an affidavit filed by Jetter in New York Family Court in an effort to increase child support payments from Humperdinck. Jetter lost the action. Jetter had successfully brought a paternity suit against Humperdinck following the birth of her daughter Jennifer in 1977.

In 2017, the singer revealed that Patricia had been suffering from Alzheimer's disease for 10 years. She died in Los Angeles on 5 February 2021. Humperdinck later described how the family had prayed with her and blessed her with water from Lourdes before she "slipped softly away".

Humperdinck retains ties with Leicestershire, where he spent much of his youth, and is a fan of Leicester City F.C. In August 2005, he auctioned one of his Harley-Davidson motorbikes on eBay to raise money for the County Air Ambulance in Leicestershire. In 2006, the University of Leicester awarded Humperdinck an Honorary Doctorate of Music. On 25 February 2009, Leicester City Council announced that Humperdinck would be given the Honorary Freedom of Leicester alongside author Sue Townsend and former professional footballer Alan Birchenall. In 2010, Humperdinck was one of the first nine people to be honoured with a plaque on the Leicester Walk of Fame.

Humperdinck has also been active in real-estate investments in Mexico and the US. In the latter half of the 1970s, the singer bought the Pink Palace in Los Angeles, previously the home of Jayne Mansfield; in 2002, he sold it to developers. During the 1980s, Humperdinck bought a hotel property in La Paz, Mexico, and renamed it La Posada de Engelbert. The hotel was demolished in 2012, and replaced by the Posada Hotel Beach Club.

Humperdinck was appointed Member of the Order of the British Empire (MBE) in the 2021 Birthday Honours for services to music.

== Compositions ==
Although known primarily as a vocalist, Humperdinck has written or co-written several songs. Among these are "This and That", recorded by Tom Jones in 1966, "A Good Thing Going" from the 1969 album Engelbert, "Everywhere I Go" from the 1993 album Yours, "Hello Out There", "Falling in Love Again", "Reach Out", "Spread a Little Sunshine", "Fiesta Europa", "We Dance the Night Away", and "The Right Thing That We Do" from the 1992 album Hello Out There.

== Selected discography ==
- Release Me (1967)
- The Last Waltz (1967)
- A Man Without Love (1968)
- Engelbert (1969)
- Engelbert Humperdinck (1969)
- We Made It Happen (1970)
- Sweetheart (1971)
- Another Time, Another Place (1971)
- In Time (1972)
- King of Hearts (1973)
- My Love (1973)
- After the Lovin' (1976)
- Miracles (1977)
- Christmas Tyme (1977)
- Last of the Romantics (1978)
- This Moment in Time (1979)
- Love's Only Love (1980)

== Bibliography ==
- Claghorn, Charles Eugene. Biographical Dictionary of American Music, Parker Pub. Co., 1974. ISBN 9780130763310
- Clarke, Donald (ed.). The Penguin Encyclopedia of Popular Music, Viking, 1989. ISBN 9780670803491
- Larkin, Colin. The Guinness Encyclopedia of Popular Music, Guinness Publishing, 1992. ISBN 9780851129396
- Sadie, Stanley; Hitchcock, H. Wiley (eds.). The New Grove Dictionary of American Music. Grove's Dictionaries of Music, 1986. ISBN 9780333378793
- Stambler, Irwin. Encyclopedia of Pop, Rock and Soul, St. Martin's Press, 1974. ASIN B000Q9NHJG/ISBN 9780312043100 (Revised 1990)
- Whitburn, Joel. The Billboard Book of Top 40 Hits, 5th edition, Watson-Guptill Publications, 1992. ISBN 9780823082803

| Preceded by Blue with "I Can" | UK in the Eurovision Song Contest; 2012 | Succeeded by Bonnie Tyler with "Believe in Me" |
