= Parrot Records =

American record label

Parrot Records was an American record label, a division of London Records, which started in 1964. The label usually licensed (or leased) recordings made by Decca Records, England, for release in the United States and Canada, most notably by the Zombies, Tom Jones, Engelbert Humperdinck, Them, Jonathan King, Hedgehoppers Anonymous, Lulu, Savoy Brown and Alan Price. Other artists included the Detroit-based Frijid Pink, Love Sculpture (reissued from EMI) and Bobby "Boris" Pickett (reissued from Garpax). Parrot's biggest hit was "She's A Lady" by Tom Jones, peaking at #2 on the Billboard charts in early 1971.

The label lasted until 1979. After Parrot became defunct, its artists were moved to the London label. The Parrot catalogue is currently managed by Polydor, a unit of Universal Music Group in the U.S.

== See also ==
- List of record labels
