= List of UK Albums Chart number ones of the 1970s =

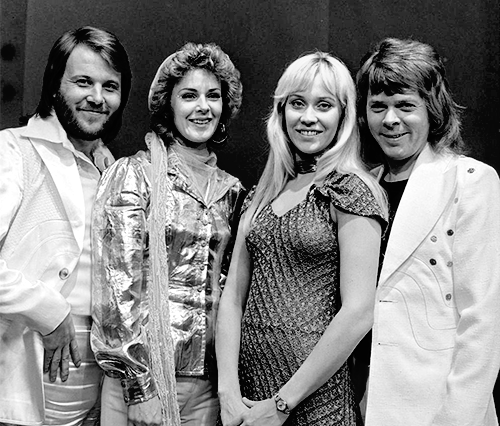
Swedish group ABBA spent 35 weeks at the top of the UK Album Chart during the 1970s, longer than any other artist.

The UK Albums Chart is a record chart based on weekly album sales in the United Kingdom; during the 1970s, a total of 148 albums reached number one. In October 1971, Imagine by John Lennon and The Plastic Ono Band became the 100th album to top the UK chart; seven years later, Nightflight to Venus by Boney M. became the 200th album to do so.

== Number ones ==
Key
No.	nth album to top the UK Albums Chart
re	Return of an album to number one
†	Best-selling album of the year
‡	Best-selling album of the decade

No.	Artist (Note: The artist, album, date of reaching number one and number of weeks at number one are those given by the OCC.)	Album	Record label (Note: The record labels are those given by the OCC.)	Reached number one (for the week ending)	Weeks at number one
1970
re	The Beatles	Abbey Road	Apple	27 December 1969	6
74	Led Zeppelin	Led Zeppelin II	Atlantic	7 February 1970	1
75	Various artists	Motown Chartbusters Volume 3	Tamla Motown	14 February 1970	1
76	Simon & Garfunkel	Bridge Over Troubled Water ‡	CBS	21 February 1970	13
77	The Beatles	Let It Be	Apple	23 May 1970	3
re	Simon & Garfunkel	Bridge Over Troubled Water ‡	CBS	13 June 1970	4
78	Bob Dylan	Self Portrait	CBS	11 July 1970	1
re	Simon & Garfunkel	Bridge Over Troubled Water ‡	CBS	18 July 1970	5
79	The Moody Blues	A Question of Balance	Threshold	22 August 1970	3
80	Creedence Clearwater Revival	Cosmo's Factory	Liberty	12 September 1970	1
81	The Rolling Stones	Get Yer Ya-Ya's Out! The Rolling Stones in Concert	Decca	19 September 1970	2
re	Simon & Garfunkel	Bridge Over Troubled Water ‡	CBS	3 October 1970	1
82	Black Sabbath	Paranoid	Vertigo	10 October 1970	1
re	Simon & Garfunkel	Bridge Over Troubled Water ‡	CBS	17 October 1970	1
83	Pink Floyd	Atom Heart Mother	Harvest	24 October 1970	1
84	Various artists	Motown Chartbusters Volume 4	Tamla Motown	31 October 1970	1
85	Led Zeppelin	Led Zeppelin III	Atlantic	7 November 1970	3
86	Bob Dylan	New Morning	CBS	28 November 1970	1
87	Andy Williams	Andy Williams' Greatest Hits	CBS	5 December 1970	1
re	Led Zeppelin	Led Zeppelin III	Atlantic	12 December 1970	1
re	Andy Williams	Andy Williams' Greatest Hits	CBS	19 December 1970	4
1971
re	Simon & Garfunkel	Bridge Over Troubled Water ‡	CBS	16 January 1971	3
88	George Harrison	All Things Must Pass	Apple	6 February 1971	8
89	Andy Williams	Home Lovin' Man	CBS	3 April 1971	2
90	Various artists	Motown Chartbusters Volume 5	Tamla Motown	17 April 1971	3
91	The Rolling Stones	Sticky Fingers	Rolling Stones	8 May 1971	4
92	Paul and Linda McCartney	Ram	Apple	5 June 1971	2
re	The Rolling Stones	Sticky Fingers	Rolling Stones	19 June 1971	1
93	Emerson, Lake & Palmer	Tarkus	Island	26 June 1971	1
re	Simon & Garfunkel	Bridge Over Troubled Water ‡	CBS	3 July 1971	5
94	Various artists	Hot Hits 6	Music for Pleasure	7 August 1971	1
95	The Moody Blues	Every Good Boy Deserves Favour	Threshold	14 August 1971	1
96	Various artists	Top of the Pops, Volume 18	Hallmark	21 August 1971	3
re	Simon & Garfunkel	Bridge Over Troubled Water ‡	CBS	11 September 1971	1
97	The Who	Who's Next	Track	18 September 1971	1
98	Deep Purple	Fireball	Harvest	25 September 1971	1
99	Rod Stewart	Every Picture Tells a Story	Mercury	2 October 1971	4
100	John Lennon and The Plastic Ono Band	Imagine	Apple	30 October 1971	2
re	Rod Stewart	Every Picture Tells a Story	Mercury	13 November 1971	2
101	Various artists	Top of the Pops, Volume 20	Hallmark	27 November 1971	1
102	Led Zeppelin	Led Zeppelin IV	Atlantic	4 December 1971	2
103	T.Rex	Electric Warrior	Fly	18 December 1971	6
1972
104	George Harrison, Bob Dylan and others	The Concert for Bangladesh	Apple	29 January 1972	1
re	T.Rex	Electric Warrior	Fly	5 February 1972	2
105	Neil Reid	Neil Reid	Decca	19 February 1972	3
106	Neil Young	Harvest	Reprise	11 March 1972	1
107	Paul Simon	Paul Simon	CBS	18 March 1972	1
108	Lindisfarne	Fog on the Tyne	Charisma	25 March 1972	4
109	Deep Purple	Machine Head	Purple	22 April 1972	2
110	T.Rex	Prophets, Seers & Sages: The Angels of the Ages / My People Were Fair and Had Sky in Their Hair... But Now They're Content to Wear Stars on Their Brows	Fly Double Back	6 May 1972	1
re	Deep Purple	Machine Head	Purple	13 May 1972	1
111	T.Rex	Bolan Boogie	Fly	20 May 1972	3
112	The Rolling Stones	Exile on Main St.	Rolling Stones	10 June 1972	1
113	Various artists	20 Dynamic Hits †	K-tel	17 June 1972	8
114	Various artists	20 Fantastic Hits	Arcade	12 August 1972	5
115	Rod Stewart	Never a Dull Moment	Philips	16 September 1972	2
re	Various artists	20 Fantastic Hits	Arcade	30 September 1972	1
116	Various artists	20 All Time Greats of the 50s	K-tel	7 October 1972	8
117	Various artists	25 Rockin' and Rollin' Greats	K-tel	2 December 1972	3
re	Various artists	20 All Time Greats of the 50s	K-tel	23 December 1972	3
1973
118	Slade	Slayed?	Polydor	13 January 1973	1
119	Gilbert O'Sullivan	Back to Front	MAM	20 January 1973	1
re	Slade	Slayed?	Polydor	27 January 1973	2
120	Elton John	Don't Shoot Me I'm Only the Piano Player †	DJM	10 February 1973	6
121	Alice Cooper	Billion Dollar Babies	Warner Bros.	24 March 1973	1
122	Various artists	20 Flash Back Greats of the Sixties	K-tel	31 March 1973	2
123	Led Zeppelin	Houses of the Holy	Atlantic	14 April 1973	2
124	Faces	Ooh La La	Warner Bros.	28 April 1973	1
125	David Bowie	Aladdin Sane	RCA Victor	5 May 1973	5
126	Various artists	Pure Gold	EMI	9 June 1973	3
127	Original soundtrack	That'll Be the Day	Ronco	30 June 1973	7
128	Peters and Lee	We Can Make It	Philips	18 August 1973	2
129	Rod Stewart	Sing It Again Rod	Mercury	1 September 1973	3
130	The Rolling Stones	Goats Head Soup	Rolling Stones	22 September 1973	2
131	Slade	Sladest	Polydor	6 October 1973	3
132	Status Quo	Hello!	Vertigo	27 October 1973	1
133	David Bowie	Pin Ups	RCA Victor	3 November 1973	5
134	Roxy Music	Stranded	Island	8 December 1973	1
135	David Cassidy	Dreams Are Nuthin' More Than Wishes	Bell	15 December 1973	1
136	Elton John	Goodbye Yellow Brick Road	DJM	22 December 1973	2
1974
137	Yes	Tales from Topographic Oceans	Atlantic	5 January 1974	2
re	Slade	Sladest	Polydor	19 January 1974	1
138	Perry Como	And I Love You So	RCA Victor	26 January 1974	1
139	The Carpenters	The Singles: 1969–1973 †	A&M	2 February 1974	4
140	Slade	Old New Borrowed and Blue	Polydor	2 March 1974	1
re	The Carpenters	The Singles: 1969–1973 †	A&M	9 March 1974	11
141	Rick Wakeman	Journey to the Centre of the Earth	A&M	25 May 1974	1
re	The Carpenters	The Singles: 1969–1973 †	A&M	1 June 1974	1
142	David Bowie	Diamond Dogs	RCA Victor	8 June 1974	4
re	The Carpenters	The Singles: 1969–1973 †	A&M	6 July 1974	1
143	Elton John	Caribou	DJM	13 July 1974	2
144	Paul McCartney & Wings	Band on the Run	Apple	27 July 1974	7
145	Mike Oldfield	Hergest Ridge	Virgin	14 September 1974	3
146	Mike Oldfield	Tubular Bells	Virgin	5 October 1974	1
147	Bay City Rollers	Rollin'	Bell	12 October 1974	1
148	Rod Stewart	Smiler	Mercury	19 October 1974	1
re	Bay City Rollers	Rollin'	Bell	26 October 1974	1
re	Rod Stewart	Smiler	Mercury	2 November 1974	1
re	Bay City Rollers	Rollin'	Bell	9 November 1974	2
149	Elton John	Elton John's Greatest Hits	DJM	23 November 1974	11
1975
150	Engelbert Humperdinck	His Greatest Hits	Decca	8 February 1975	3
151	Status Quo	On the Level	Vertigo	1 March 1975	2
152	Led Zeppelin	Physical Graffiti	Swan Song	15 March 1975	1
153	Tom Jones	20 Greatest Hits	Decca	22 March 1975	4
154	The Stylistics	The Best of the Stylistics †	Avco	19 April 1975	2
155	Bay City Rollers	Once Upon a Star	Bell	3 May 1975	3
re	The Stylistics	The Best of the Stylistics †	Avco	24 May 1975	5
156	Wings	Venus and Mars	Apple	28 June 1975	1
157	The Carpenters	Horizon	A&M	5 July 1975	2
re	Wings	Venus and Mars	Apple	19 July 1975	1
re	The Carpenters	Horizon	A&M	26 July 1975	3
re	The Stylistics	The Best of the Stylistics †	Avco	16 August 1975	2
158	Rod Stewart	Atlantic Crossing	Warner Bros.	30 August 1975	5
159	Pink Floyd	Wish You Were Here	Harvest	4 October 1975	1
re	Rod Stewart	Atlantic Crossing	Warner Bros.	11 October 1975	2
160	Jim Reeves	40 Golden Greats	Arcade	25 October 1975	3
161	Max Boyce	We All Had Doctors' Papers	EMI	15 November 1975	1
162	Perry Como	40 Greatest Hits	K-tel	22 November 1975	5
163	Queen	A Night at the Opera	EMI	27 December 1975	2
1976
re	Perry Como	40 Greatest Hits	K-tel	10 January 1976	1
re	Queen	A Night at the Opera	EMI	17 January 1976	2
164	Roy Orbison	The Best of Roy Orbison	Arcade	31 January 1976	1
165	Slim Whitman	The Very Best of Slim Whitman	United Artists	7 February 1976	6
166	Status Quo	Blue for You	Vertigo	20 March 1976	3
167	Rock Follies	Rock Follies	Island	10 April 1976	2
168	Led Zeppelin	Presence	Swan Song	24 April 1976	1
re	Rock Follies	Rock Follies	Island	1 May 1976	1
169	ABBA	Greatest Hits †	Epic	8 May 1976	9
170	Rod Stewart	A Night on the Town	Riva	10 July 1976	2
171	The Beach Boys	20 Golden Greats	Capitol	24 July 1976	10
172	The Stylistics	The Best of the Stylistics Volume II	H&L	2 October 1976	1
173	Dr. Feelgood	Stupidity	United Artists	9 October 1976	1
re	ABBA	Greatest Hits †	Epic	16 October 1976	2
174	Various artists	Soul Motion	K-tel	30 October 1976	2
175	Led Zeppelin	The Song Remains the Same	Swan Song	13 November 1976	1
176	Bert Weedon	22 Golden Guitar Greats	Warwick	20 November 1976	1
177	Glen Campbell	Glen Campbell's Twenty Golden Greats	Capitol	27 November 1976	6
1977
178	Queen	A Day at the Races	EMI	8 January 1977	1
179	ABBA	Arrival †	Epic	15 January 1977	1
180	Slim Whitman	Red River Valley	United Artists	22 January 1977	4
181	The Shadows	20 Golden Greats	EMI	19 February 1977	6
182	Frank Sinatra	Portrait of Sinatra – Forty Songs from the Life of a Man	Reprise	2 April 1977	2
re	ABBA	Arrival †	Epic	16 April 1977	9
183	The Beatles	The Beatles at the Hollywood Bowl	Parlophone	18 June 1977	1
184	The Muppets	The Muppet Show	Pye	25 June 1977	1
185	Barbra Streisand & Kris Kristofferson	A Star Is Born	CBS	2 July 1977	2
186	Johnny Mathis	The Mathis Collection	CBS	16 July 1977	4
187	Yes	Going for the One	Atlantic	13 August 1977	2
188	Connie Francis	20 All Time Greats	Polydor	27 August 1977	2
189	Elvis Presley	Elvis' 40 Greatest	Arcade	10 September 1977	1
190	Diana Ross & the Supremes	20 Golden Greats	Motown	17 September 1977	7
191	Cliff Richard & The Shadows	40 Golden Greats	EMI	5 November 1977	1
192	Sex Pistols	Never Mind the Bollocks, Here's the Sex Pistols	Virgin	12 November 1977	2
193	Bread	The Sound of Bread	Elektra	26 November 1977	2
194	Various artists	Disco Fever	K-tel	10 December 1977	6
1978
re	Bread	The Sound of Bread	Elektra	21 January 1978	1
195	Fleetwood Mac	Rumours	Warner Bros.	28 January 1978	1
196	ABBA	The Album	Epic	4 February 1978	7
197	Buddy Holly & The Crickets	20 Golden Greats	EMI	25 March 1978	3
198	Nat King Cole	20 Golden Greats	Capitol	15 April 1978	3
199	Original soundtrack	Saturday Night Fever †	RSO	6 May 1978	18
200	Boney M.	Nightflight to Venus	Atlantic	9 September 1978	4
201	Original soundtrack	Grease	RSO	7 October 1978	13
1979
202	Showaddywaddy	Greatest Hits 1976-1978	Arista	6 January 1979	2
203	Various artists	Don't Walk – Boogie	EMI	20 January 1979	3
204	Various artists	Action Replay	K-tel	10 February 1979	1
205	Blondie	Parallel Lines †	Chrysalis	17 February 1979	4
206	Bee Gees	Spirits Having Flown	RSO	17 March 1979	2
207	Barbra Streisand	Barbra Streisand's Greatest Hits Vol. 2	CBS	31 March 1979	4
208	Leo Sayer	The Very Best of Leo Sayer	Chrysalis	28 April 1979	3
209	ABBA	Voulez-Vous	Epic	19 May 1979	4
210	Electric Light Orchestra	Discovery	Jet	16 June 1979	5
211	Tubeway Army	Replicas	Beggars Banquet	21 July 1979	1
212	Various artists	The Best Disco Album in the World	WEA	28 July 1979	6
213	Led Zeppelin	In Through the Out Door	Swan Song	8 September 1979	2
214	Gary Numan	The Pleasure Principle	Beggars Banquet	22 September 1979	1
215	Boney M	Oceans of Fantasy	Atlantic	29 September 1979	1
re	Gary Numan	The Pleasure Principle	Beggars Banquet	6 October 1979	1
216	Blondie	Eat to the Beat	Chrysalis	13 October 1979 (Note: "During October 1979, a change in the publication date of the album chart meant that two rundowns were published in one week, which results (naturally) in two number 1 albums – Blondie’s Eat to the Beat and The Police’s Regatta De Blanc. Contrary to some databases, we take the view that both charts are valid – so Eat to the Beat WAS a number 1, despite the fact that some histories indicate that it peaked at 2.")	1
217	The Police	Reggatta de Blanc	A&M	13 October 1979	4
218	Fleetwood Mac	Tusk	Warner Bros.	10 November 1979	1
219	ABBA	Greatest Hits Vol. 2	Epic	17 November 1979	3
220	Rod Stewart	Greatest Hits, Vol. 1	Riva	8 December 1979	5

=== By artist ===
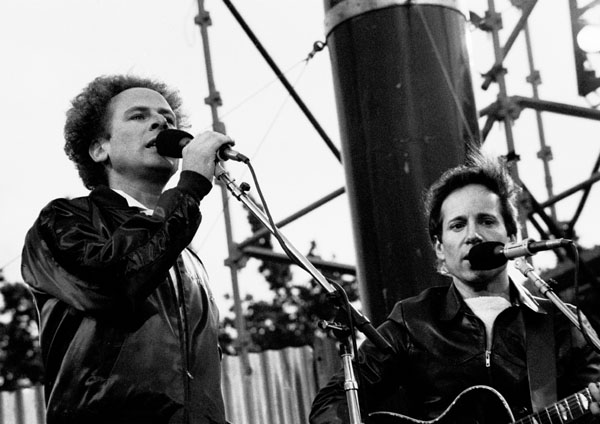
Simon & Garfunkel's album Bridge Over Troubled Water topped the albums chart for 33 weeks during the 1970s, and was the decade's biggest-seller.

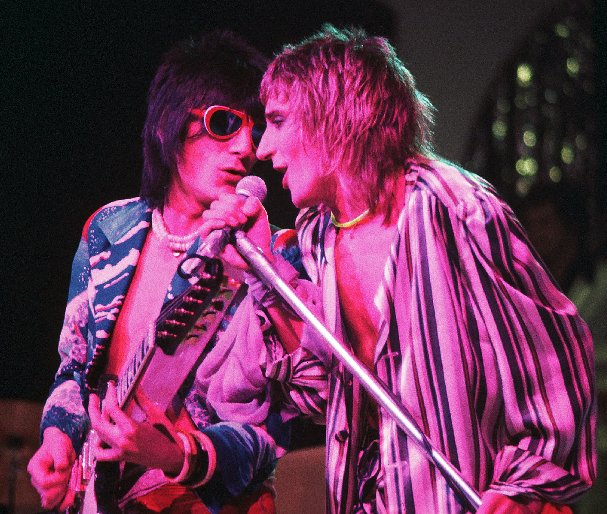
Rod Stewart (right) released seven number-one albums during this decade.

Five artists spent 20 weeks or more at number one on the albums chart during the 1970s.

Artist	Number-one albums	Weeks at number one
ABBA	5	35
Simon & Garfunkel	1	33
Rod Stewart	7	27
The Carpenters	2	22
Elton John	4	21

=== By record label ===
Eight record labels spent 20 weeks or more at number one on the albums chart during the 1970s.

Record label	Number-one albums	Weeks at number one
CBS Records	9	53
K-tel	8	39
Epic Records	5	35
RSO Records	3	33
Apple Records	8	29
A&M Records	4	27
EMI Records	8	22
DJM Records	4	21
