= List of Melody Maker UK number one albums =

This is a complete list of the Melody Maker number-one albums in the UK from 1958 to 1988.

== Date, album, artist, weeks at No. 1 ==
=== 1950s ===
Year	Date	Album	Artist	Weeks at No. 1
1958	8 November	South Pacific	Soundtrack	8
1959	Whole year	South Pacific	Soundtrack	52

=== 1960s ===
Year	Date	Album	Artist	Weeks at No. 1
1960	12 March	The Explosive Freddy Cannon	Freddy Cannon	1
1960	19 March	South Pacific	Soundtrack	19
1960	30 July	Elvis Is Back	Elvis Presley	1
1960	6 August	South Pacific	Soundtrack	5
1960	10 September	Down Drury Lane to Memory Lane	101 Strings	5
1960	15 October	South Pacific	Soundtrack	13
1961	14 January	G.I Blues	Elvis Presley	7
1961	4 March	South Pacific	Soundtrack	10
1961	29 July	The Black and White Minstrel Show	George Mitchell Minstrels	4
1961	23 September	The Shadows	The Shadows	4
1961	28 October	The Shadows	The Shadows	1
1961	4 November	21 Today	Cliff Richard and The Shadows	1
1961	11 November	South Pacific	Soundtrack	1
1961	18 November	Something For Everybody	Elvis Presley	2
1961	2 December	The Shadows	The Shadows	1
1961	9 December	Something For Everybody	Elvis Presley	1
1961	16 December	South Pacific	Soundtrack	1
1961	23 December	Blue Hawaii	Elvis Presley	4
1962	20 January	The Young Ones	Cliff Richard	5
1962	24 February	Blue Hawaii	Elvis Presley	1
1962	3 March	The Young Ones	Cliff Richard	1
1962	10 March	Blue Hawaii	Elvis Presley	15
1962	23 June	West Side Story	Soundtrack	7
1962	11 August	Pot Luck	Elvis Presley	3
1962	1 September	West Side Story	Soundtrack	9
1962	3 November	Out of The Shadows	The Shadows	4
1962	1 December	West Side Story	Soundtrack	2
1962	15 December	On Stage With the Black and White Minstrels	George Mitchell Minstrels	4
1963	12 January	Out of The Shadows	The Shadows	2
1963	26 January	West Side Story	Soundtrack	1
1963	2 February	Summer Holiday	Cliff Richard	13
1963	4 May	Please Please Me	The Beatles	30
1963	30 November	With the Beatles	The Beatles	22
1964	2 May	The Rolling Stones	The Rolling Stones	11
1964	18 July	A Hard Day's Night	The Beatles	21
1964	12 December	Beatles For Sale	The Beatles	9
1965	13 February	The Rolling Stones No. 2	The Rolling Stones	10
1965	24 April	Beatles For Sale	The Beatles	6
1965	5 June	The Freewheelin' Bob Dylan	Bob Dylan	1
1965	12 June	Bringing It All back Home	Bob Dylan	1
1965	19 June	The Sound of Music	Soundtrack	8
1965	14 August	Help!	The Beatles	9
1965	16 October	Out of Our Heads	The Rolling Stones	1
1965	23 October	Help!	The Beatles	6
1965	27 November	The Sound of Music	Soundtrack	2
1965	11 December	Rubber Soul	The Beatles	13
1966	12 March	The Sound of Music	Soundtrack	7
1966	30 April	Aftermath	The Rolling Stones	9
1966	2 July	The Sound of Music	Soundtrack	6
1966	13 August	Revolver	The Beatles	9
1966	15 October	The Sound of Music	Soundtrack	16
1967	4 February	The Monkees	Monkees	7
1967	25 March	The Sound of Music	Soundtrack	4
1967	22 April	More of The Monkees	The Monkees	2
1967	6 May	The Sound of Music	Soundtrack	4
1967	3 June	Sgt Peppers Lonely Hearts Club Band	The Beatles	22
1967	4 November	The Sound of Music	Soundtrack	11
1968	20 January	Val Doonican Rocks-But Gently	Val Doonican	2
1968	3 February	The Sound of Music	Soundtrack	4
1968	2 March	Diana Ross and the Supremes Greatest Hits	Diana Ross and the Supremes	2
1968	16 March	John Wesley Harding	Bob Dylan	10
1968	25 May	This Is Soul	Various	7
1968	13 July	Ogdens Nut Gone Flake	Small Faces	5
1968	17 August	Delilah	Tom Jones	1
1968	24 August	Bookends	Simon & Garfunkel	5
1968	28 September	Hollies Greatest Hits	The Hollies	6
1968	9 November	Live At The Talk Of The Town	The Seekers	1
1968	16 November	Hollies Greatest Hits	The Hollies	3
1968	7 December	The Beatles	The Beatles	11
1969	22 February	Diana Ross & the Supremes Join the Temptations	Diana Ross and the Supremes	5
1969	29 March	Goodbye	Cream	4
1969	26 April	The Best of the Seekers	The Seekers	1
1969	3 May	Goodbye	Cream	1
1969	10 May	Best of The Seekers	The Seekers	1
1969	17 May	On The Threshold of A Dream	The Moody Blues	1
1969	24 May	Nashville Skyline	Bob Dylan	6
1969	5 July	This Is Tom Jones	Tom Jones	2
1969	19 July	Flaming Star	Elvis Presley	4
1969	16 August	Stand Up	Jethro Tull	6
1969	27 September	Blind Faith	Blind Faith	1
1969	4 October	Abbey Road	The Beatles	20

=== 1970s ===
Year	Date	Album	Artist	Weeks at No. 1
1970	21 February	Led Zeppelin II	Led Zeppelin	2
1970	7 March	Bridge Over Troubled Water	Simon & Garfunkel	13
1970	6 June	Let It Be	The Beatles	8
1970	1 August	Bridge Over Troubled Water	Simon & Garfunkel	7
1970	19 September	A Question of Balance	The Moody Blues	3
1970	10 October	Get Yer Ya Ya's Out!	The Rolling Stones	3
1970	31 October	Paranoid	Black Sabbath	1
1970	7 November	Bridge Over Troubled Water	Simon & Garfunkel	1
1970	14 November	Paranoid	Black Sabbath	1
1970	21 November	Led Zeppelin III	Led Zeppelin	7
1971	9 January	Bridge Over Troubled Water	Simon & Garfunkel	4
1971	6 February	All Things Must Pass	George Harrison	8
1971	3 April	Bridge Over Troubled Water	Simon & Garfunkel	2
1971	17 April	Home Lovin' Man	Andy Williams	4
1971	15 May	Tamla Mowtown Chartbusters Vol 2	Various	1
1971	22 May	Sticky Fingers	The Rolling Stones	7
1971	10 July	Tarkus	Emerson, Lake & Palmer	1
1971	17 July	Ram	Paul and Linda McCartney	1
1971	24 July	Bridge Over Troubled Water	Simon & Garfunkel	1
1971	31 July	Ram	Paul and Linda McCartney	1
1971	7 August	Bridge Over Troubled Water	Simon & Garfunkel	1
1971	14 August	Ram	Paul and Linda McCartney	1
1971	21 August	Every Good Boy Deserves Favour	The Moody Blues	4
1971	18 September	Every Picture Tells A Story	Rod Stewart	1
1971	25 September	Tapestry	Carole King	1
1971	2 October	Every Picture Tells A Story	Rod Stewart	10
1971	11 December	Imagine	John Lennon	4
1972	8 January	Electric Warrior	T. Rex	4
1972	5 February	Teaser and the Firecat	Cat Stevens	1
1972	12 February	Electric Warrior	T. Rex	3
1972	4 March	Teaser and the Firecat	Cat Stevens	2
1972	18 March	Paul Simon	Paul Simon	4
1972	15 April	Harvest	Neil Young	7
1972	3 June	Bolan Boogie	T. Rex	6
1972	15 July	American Pie	Don McLean	3
1972	5 August	Simon and Garfunkel's Greatest Hits	Simon & Garfunkel	4
1972	2 September	Never a Dull Moment	Rod Stewart	7
1972	21 October	Catch Bull At Four	Cat Stevens	1
1972	28 October	Never a Dull Moment	Rod Stewart	1
1972	4 November	Simon and Garfunkel's Greatest Hits	Simon & Garfunkel	3
1972	25 November	20 All Time Greats of The 50's	Various	1
1972	2 December	Back To Front	Gilbert O'Sullivan	3
1972	23 December	20 All time Greats of The 50's	Various	2
1973	6 January	Slayed?	Slade	2
1973	20 January	Back To Front	Gilbert O' Sullivan	3
1973	10 February	Slayed?	Slade	1
1973	17 February	No Secrets	Carly Simon	1
1973	24 February	Don't Shoot Me I'm Only the Piano Player	Elton John	7
1973	14 April	Tanx	T. Rex	1
1973	21 April	Billion Dollar Babies	Alice Cooper	1
1973	28 April	Houses of The Holy	Led Zeppelin	1
1973	5 May	Ooh La La	Faces	2
1973	19 May	Aladdin Sane	David Bowie	4
1973	16 June	Aladdin Sane and 1962–1966	David Bowie and Beatles	1
1973	23 June	Aladdin Sane	David Bowie	2
1973	7 July	1967–1970	The Beatles	2
1973	21 July	Aladdin Sane	David Bowie	3
1973	11 August	We Can Make It	Peters and Lee	3
1973	1 September	Now & Then	The Carpenters	3
1973	22 September	Sing It Again Rod	Rod Stewart	2
1973	6 October	Goats Head Soup	The Rolling Stones	3
1973	27 October	Sladest	Slade	1
1973	3 November	Hello!	Status Quo	1
1973	10 November	Pin-Ups	David Bowie	5
1973	15 December	Stranded	Roxy Music	5
1974	19 January	Goodbye Yellow Brick Road	Elton John	1
1974	26 January	Stranded	Roxy Music	2
1974	9 February	The Singles: 1969–1973	The Carpenters	17
1974	8 June	Journey To The Centre of The Earth	Rick Wakeman	1
1974	15 June	Diamond Dogs	David Bowie	4
1974	13 July	Tubular Bells	Mike Oldfield	1
1974	20 July	The Singles: 1969–1973	The Carpenters	1
1974	27 July	Tubular Bells	Mike Oldfield	1
1974	3 August	Band on the Run	Paul McCartney and Wings	6
1974	14 September	Tubular Bells	Mike Oldfield	3
1974	5 October	Hergest Ridge	Mike Oldfield	1
1974	12 October	Tubular Bells	Mike Oldfield	3
1974	2 November	Smiler	Rod Stewart	4
1974	30 November	Greatest Hits	Elton John	12
1975	22 February	Tubular Bells	Mike Oldfield	3
1975	15 March	Crime Of The Century	Supertramp	1
1975	22 March	On the Level	Status Quo	2
1975	5 April	20 Greatest Hits	Tom Jones	1
1975	12 April	Physical Graffiti	Led Zeppelin	1
1975	19 April	20 Greatest Hits	Tom Jones	1
1975	26 April	Young Americans	David Bowie	1
1975	3 May	The Myths and Legends of King Arthur and the Knights of the Round Table	Rick Wakeman	1
1975	10 May	Once Upon a Star	Bay City Rollers	5
1975	14 June	The Best of The Stylistics	The Stylistics	1
1975	21 June	Captain Fantastic and the Brown Dirt Cowboy	Elton John	3
1975	12 July	Venus and Mars	Wings	7
1975	30 August	Best of the Stylistics	The Stylistics	1
1975	6 September	Atlantic Crossing	Rod Stewart	9
1975	8 November	Wish You Were Here	Pink Floyd	1
1975	15 November	Siren	Roxy Music	1
1975	22 November	40 Greatest Hits	Perry Como	1
1975	29 November	Siren	Roxy Music	1
1975	6 December	40 Greatest Hits	Perry Como	1
1975	13 December	Ommadawn	Mike Oldfield	1
1975	20 December	A Night At The Opera	Queen	9
1976	21 February	Desire	Bob Dylan	1
1976	28 February	The Very Best of Slim Whitman	Slim Whitman	4
1976	27 March	Carnival	Manual and The Music of The Mountains	1
1976	3 April	Their Greatest Hits (1971–1975)	Eagles	3
1976	24 April	Rock Follies	Soundtrack	3
1976	15 May	Greatest Hits	ABBA	9
1976	17 July	A Night on the Town	Rod Stewart	1
1976	24 July	20 Golden Greats	The Beach Boys	11
1976	9 October	Greatest Hits	ABBA	4
1976	6 November	Songs in the Key of Life	Stevie Wonder	2
1976	20 November	The Song Remains the Same	Led Zeppelin	1
1976	27 November	Songs in the Key of Life	Stevie Wonder	2
1976	11 December	Glen Campbell's Twenty Golden Greats	Glen Campbell	1
1976	18 December	Arrival	ABBA	7
1977	5 February	Red River Valley	Slim Whitman	1
1977	12 February	Songs in the Key of Life	Stevie Wonder	1
1977	19 February	Red River Valley	Slim Whitman	1
1977	26 February	Evita	Various	1
1977	5 March	20 Golden Greats	The Shadows	5
1977	9 April	Portrait of Sinatra – Forty Songs from the Life of a Man	Frank Sinatra	3
1977	30 April	Arrival	ABBA	4
1977	28 May	Hotel California	Eagles	1
1977	4 June	Arrival	ABBA	2
1977	18 June	Hotel California	The Eagles	2
1977	2 July	A Star Is Born	Soundtrack	1
1977	9 July	The Muppet Show	The Muppets	2
1977	23 July	A Star is Born	Soundtrack	1
1977	30 July	The Johnny Mathis Collection	Johnny Mathis	1
1977	6 August	A Star is Born	Soundtrack	2
1977	20 August	Going for the One	Yes	3
1977	10 September	Oxygène	Jean-Michel Jarre	3
1977	1 October	20 Golden Greats	Diana Ross and The Supremes	6
1977	12 November	40 Golden Greats	Cliff Richard	1
1977	19 November	Foot Loose & Fancy Free	Rod Stewart	1
1977	26 November	The Sound of Bread	Bread	10
1978	4 February	Rumours	Fleetwood Mac	2
1978	18 February	ABBA: The Album	ABBA	7
1978	8 April	20 Golden Greats	Buddy Holly and the Crickets	1
1978	15 April	The Kick Inside	Kate Bush	1
1978	22 April	20 Golden Greats	Nat King Cole	1
1978	29 April	...And Then There Were Three...	Genesis	1
1978	6 May	Saturday Night Fever	Various	18
1978	9 September	Nightflight to Venus	Boney M	4
1978	7 October	Grease	Soundtrack	11
1978	23 December	Blondes Have More Fun	Rod Stewart	3
1979	13 January	The Singles: 1974–1978	The Carpenters	2
1979	27 January	Don't Walk, Boogie	Various	2
1979	10 February	Parallel Lines	Blondie	8
1979	7 April	Barbra Streisand's Greatest Hits Volume 2	Barbra Streisand	3
1979	28 April	The Very Best of Leo Sayer	Leo Sayer	4
1979	26 May	Breakfast in America	Supertramp	1
1979	2 June	Voulez-Vous	ABBA	2
1979	16 June	Do It Yourself	Ian Dury and the Blockheads	1
1979	23 June	Discovery	Electric Light Orchestra	4
1979	21 July	Replicas	Tubeway Army	3
1979	11 August	The Best Disco Album in the World	Various	3
1979	1 September	I Am	Earth, Wind & Fire	1
1979	8 September	Discovery	Electric Light Orchestra	2
1979	22 September	In Through the Out Door	Led Zeppelin	2
1979	6 October	The Pleasure Principle	Gary Numan	3
1979	27 October	Reggatta de Blanc	The Police	4
1979	24 November	Tusk	Fleetwood Mac	1
1979	1 December	Greatest Hits Vol. 2	ABBA	3
1979	22 December	The Wall	Pink Floyd	3

== 1980s ==
Year	Date	Album	Artist	Weeks at No. 1
1980	12 January	Greatest Hits Vol 2	ABBA	1
1980	19 January	The Wall	Pink Floyd	1
1980	26 January	Reggatta de Blanc	The Police	1
1980	2 February	The Pretenders	The Pretenders	4
1980	1 March	The Last Dance	Various	1
1980	8 March	Get Happy!!	Elvis Costello and The Attractions	3
1980	29 March	Tell Me on a Sunday	Marti Webb	1
1980	5 April	Tears and Laughter	Johnny Mathis	1
1980	12 April	12 Gold Bars	Status Quo	1
1980	19 April	Duke	Genesis	2
1980	3 May to 7 June	Melody Maker paused due to industrial action		
1980	7 June	Sky 2	Sky	1
1980	14 June	I Just Can't Stop It	The Beat	1
1980	21 June	Peter Gabriel	Peter Gabriel	2
1980	5 July	Peter Gabriel and Flesh and Blood	Peter Gabriel and Roxy Music	1
1980	12 July	Flesh and Blood	Roxy Music	1
1980	19 July	Emotional Rescue	The Rolling Stones	4
1980	16 August	Closer	Joy Division	1
1980	23 August	Back in Black	AC/DC	2
1980	6 September	Flesh and Blood	Roxy Music	1
1980	13 September	Drama	Yes	1
1980	20 September	Telekon	Gary Numan	1
1980	27 September	Signing Off	UB40	1
1980	4 October	Scary Monsters and Super Creeps	David Bowie	2
1980	18 October	Zenyatta Mondatta	The Police	4
1980	15 November	Guilty	Barbra Streisand	3
1980	6 December	Super Trouper	ABBA	4
1981	10 January	Double Fantasy	John Lennon	3
1981	31 January	Kings of the Wild Frontier	Adam and the Ants	3
1981	21 February	Double Fantasy	John Lennon	1
1981	28 February	Face Value	Phil Collins	4
1981	11 April	Face Dances	The Who	2
1981	25 April	Sky 3	Sky	1
1981	2 May	Come an' Get It	Whitesnake	1
1981	9 May	Future Shock	Gillan	1
1981	16 May	Kings of the Wild Frontier	Adam and the Ants	2
1981	30 May	Wha'ppen?	The Beat	2
1981	13 June	Long Play Album	Stars on 45	1
1981	20 June	Present Arms	UB40	3
1981	11 July	No Sleep 'til Hammersmith	Motörhead	3
1981	1 August	Secret Combination	Randy Crawford	3
1981	22 August	Time	ELO	4
1981	19 September	Tattoo You	The Rolling Stones	2
1981	3 October	Dead Ringer	Meat Loaf	1
1981	10 October	Abacab	Genesis	1
1981	17 October	Ghost In The Machine	The Police	3
1981	7 November	Dare	Human League	2
1981	21 November	Greatest Hits	Queen	7
1982	9 January	Dare	Human League	7
1982	27 February	Memories	Barbra Streisand	3
1982	20 March	Pelican West	Haircut 100	2
1982	3 April	The Gift	The Jam	1
1982	10 April	Memories	Barbra Streisand	3
1982	1 May	Pelican West	Haircut 100	1
1982	8 May	1+9+8+2	Status Quo	1
1982	15 May	Complete Madness	Madness	3
1982	5 June	Rio	Duran Duran	2
1982	19 June	Avalon	Roxy Music	4
1982	17 July	The Lexicon of Love	ABC	3
1982	7 August	The Kids from Fame	Soundtrack	2
1982	21 August	Too-Rye-Ay	Dexys Midnight Runners	3
1982	11 September	The Kids from Fame	Soundtrack	1
1982	18 September	Upstairs at Eric's	Yazoo	3
1982	9 October	Love Over Gold	Dire Straits	5
1982	13 November	Kissing To Be Clever	Culture Club	1
1982	20 November	Singles – 45's and Under	Squeeze	1
1982	27 November	Hello; I Must Be Going	Phil Collins	2
1982	11 December	The Singles: The First Ten Years	ABBA	4
1983	8 January	The John Lennon Collection	John Lennon	3
1983	29 January	Business as Usual	Men at Work	4
1983	26 February	Porcupine	Echo and the Bunnymen	1
1983	5 March	Business as Usual	Men at Work	1
1983	12 March	Thriller	Michael Jackson	1
1983	19 March	War	U2	2
1983	2 April	The Hurting	Tears for Fears	2
1983	16 April	The Final Cut	Pink Floyd	1
1983	23 April	Let's Dance	David Bowie	4
1983	21 May	True	Spandau Ballet	3
1983	11 June	Thriller	Michael Jackson	1
1983	18 June	Let's Dance	David Bowie	1
1983	25 June	Synchronicity	The Police	4
1983	23 July	Fantastic!	Wham!	1
1983	30 July	You and Me Both	Yazoo	1
1983	6 August	No Parlez	Paul Young	3
1983	27 August	Punch the Clock	Elvis Costello and the Attractions	1
1983	3 September	18 Greatest Hits	Michael Jackson and the Jackson Five	1
1983	10 September	Fantastic	Wham!	1
1983	17 September	Flick of the Switch	AC/DC	1
1983	24 September	Standing in the Light	Level 42	1
1983	1 October	Labour of Love	UB40	2
1983	15 October	No Parlez	Paul Young	1
1983	22 October	Genesis	Genesis	1
1983	29 October	Colour by Numbers	Culture Club	4
1983	26 November	Can't Slow Down	Lionel Richie	1
1983	3 December	Undercover	The Rolling Stones	1
1983	10 December	Seven and the Ragged Tiger	Duran Duran	1
1983	17 December	Under a Blood Red Sky	U2	1
1983	24 December	No Parlez	Paul Young	4
1984	21 January	Thriller	Michael Jackson	2
1984	4 February	Under a Blood Red Sky	U2	1
1984	11 February	Touch	Eurythmics	2
1984	25 February	Sparkle in the Rain	Simple Minds	1
1984	3 March	Into the Gap	Thompson Twins	3
1984	24 March	Human's Lib	Howard Jones	3
1984	14 April	Can't Slow Down	Lionel Richie	5
1984	19 May	Ocean Rain	Echo and the Bunnymen	1
1984	26 May	Legend	Bob Marley and the Wailers	7
1984	21 July	Parade	Spandau Ballet	1
1984	28 July	Legend	Bob Marley and the Wailers	2
1984	11 August	Diamond Life	Sade	4
1984	8 September	Now That's What I Call Music 3	Various	3
1984	29 September	The Woman in the Red	Soundtrack	2
1984	13 October	Tonight	David Bowie	1
1984	20 October	The Unforgettable Fire	U2	3
1984	10 November	Welcome to the Pleasuredome	Frankie Goes to Hollywood	2
1984	24 November	Make It Big	Wham!	3
1984	15 December	Hits 1	Various	5
1985	19 January	Alf	Alison Moyet	2
1985	2 February	Agent Provocateur	Foreigner	3
1985	23 February	Born in the U.S.A.	Bruce Springsteen	1
1985	2 March	No Jacket Required	Phil Collins	5
1985	6 April	The Secret of Association	Paul Young	4
1985	4 May	Songs from the Big Chair	Tears for Fears	2
1985	18 May	Be Yourself Tonight	Eurythmics	2
1985	1 June	Brothers in Arms	Dire Straits	2
1985	15 June	Our Favourite Shop	The Style Council	1
1985	22 June	Boys and Girls	Bryan Ferry	2
1985	6 July	Misplaced Childhood	Marillion	1
1985	13 July	Born in the U.S.A.	Bruce Springsteen	4
1985	24 August	Now That's What I Call Music 5	Various	5
1985	28 September	Hounds of Love	Kate Bush	6
1985	9 November	Once Upon a Time	Simple Minds	1
1985	16 November	Afterburner (ZZ Top album)	ZZ Top	1
1985	23 November	Promise	Sade	3
1985	14 December	Now That's What I Call Music 6	Various	5
1986	18 January	Brothers in Arms	Dire Straits	8
1986	15 March	King of America	Elvis Costello	1
1986	22 March	Brothers in Arms	Dire Straits	3
1986	12 April	Hits 4	Various	2
1986	26 April	Parade	Prince and The Revolution	1
1986	3 May	Street Life: 20 Great Hits	Bryan Ferry and Roxy Music	5
1986	7 June	So	Peter Gabriel	2
1986	21 June	A Kind of Magic	Queen	1
1986	28 June	Invisible Touch	Genesis	2
1986	12 July	True Blue	Madonna	7
1986	30 August	Dancing on the Ceiling	Lionel Richie	1
1986	6 September	Now That's What I Call Music 7	Various	3
1986	27 September	Graceland	Paul Simon	1
1986	4 October	Break Every Rule	Tina Turner	1
1986	11 October	Graceland	Paul Simon	6
1986	22 November	Every Breath You Take: The Singles	The Police	1
1986	29 November	Live 1975–85	Bruce Springsteen and E Street Band	1
1986	6 December	The Whole Story	Kate Bush	2
1986	20 December	Now That's What I Call Music 8	Various	4
1987	17 January	The Whole Story	Kate Bush	3
1987	7 February	Graceland	Paul Simon	3
1987	28 February	The Phantom of the Opera	Soundtrack	3
1987	21 March	The Joshua Tree	U2	5
1987	25 April	Raindancing	Alison Moyet	2
1987	9 May	The Joshua Tree	U2	1
1987	16 May	Keep Your Distance	Curiosity Killed the Cat	1
1987	23 May	Solitude Standing	Suzanne Vega	1
1987	30 May	It's Better to Travel	Swing Out Sister	1
1987	6 June	Live in the City of Light	Simple Minds	2
1987	20 June	Whitney	Whitney Houston	5
1987	25 July	Introducing the Hardline According to Terence Trent D'Arby	Terence Trent D'Arby	3
1987	15 August	Hits 6	Various	3
1987	5 September	Hysteria	Def Leppard	1
1987	12 September	Bad	Michael Jackson	6
1987	24 October	Tunnel of Love	Bruce Springsteen	1
1987	31 October	Nothing Like the Sun	Sting	3
1987	21 November	Faith	George Michael	1
1987	28 November	All the Best!	Paul McCartney	1
1987	5 December	Whenever You Need Somebody	Rick Astley	1
1987	12 December	Now That's What I Call Music 10	Various	6
1988	23 January	Popped In Souled Out	Wet Wet Wet	1
1988	30 January	Introducing the Hardline According to Terence Trent D'Arby	Terence Trent D'Arby	1
1988	6 February	If I Should Fall from Grace with God	The Pogues	1
1988	13 February	Introducing the Hardline According to Terence Trent D'Arby	Terence Trent D'Arby	5
1988	19 March	Children	The Mission	1
1988	26 March	Viva Hate	Morrissey	2
1988	9 April	Now That's What I Call Music 11	Various	2
1988	23 April	Push	Bros	1
1988	30 April	Seventh Son of a Seventh Son	Iron Maiden	1
