= List of UK top-ten albums in 1977 =

The UK Albums Chart is one of many music charts compiled by the Official Charts Company that calculates the best-selling albums of the week in the United Kingdom. Before 2004, the chart was only based on the sales of physical albums. This list shows albums that peaked in the Top 10 of the UK Albums Chart during 1977, as well as albums which peaked in 1976 and 1978 but were in the top 10 in 1977. The entry date is when the album appeared in the top ten for the first time (week ending, as published by the Official Charts Company, which is six days after the chart is announced).

The first new number-one album of the year was by A Day at the Races by Queen. Overall, seventeen different albums peaked at number one in 1977, with seventeen unique artists hitting that position.

== Top-ten albums ==
Key

Symbol	Meaning
‡	Album peaked in 1976 but still in chart in 1977.
♦	Album released in 1977 but peaked in 1978.
Entered	The date that the album first appeared in the chart.
Peak	Highest position that the album reached in the UK Albums Chart.

Entered (week ending)	Weeks in top 10	Single	Artist	Peak	Peak reached (week ending)	Weeks at peak
Albums in 1976
17 April 1976	49	Greatest Hits ‡	ABBA	1	8 May 1976	11
23 October 1976	19	Songs in the Key of Life ‡	Stevie Wonder	2	30 October 1976	3
6 November 1976	8	22 Golden Guitar Greats ‡	Bert Weedon	1	20 November 1976	1
13 November 1976	9	100 Golden Greats ‡	Max Bygraves	3	27 November 1976	3
20 November 1976	10	Glen Campbell's Twenty Golden Greats ‡	Glen Campbell	1	27 November 1976	6
27 November 1976	34	Arrival	ABBA	1	15 January 1977	10
4 December 1976	7	The Greatest Hits ‡	Frankie Valli and The Four Seasons	4	11 December 1976	2
11 December 1976	6	Disco Rocket ‡	Various artists	3	18 December 1976	1
11 December 1976	9	A New World Record	Electric Light Orchestra	6	25 June 1977	1
25 December 1976	22	Hotel California	Eagles	2	14 May 1977	4
25 December 1976	6	A Day at the Races	Queen	1	8 January 1977	1
Albums in 1977
8 January 1977	6	Greatest Hits	Showaddywaddy	4	8 January 1977	1
15 January 1977	7	Red River Valley	Slim Whitman	1	22 January 1977	4
15 January 1977	3	Wind & Wuthering	Genesis	7	29 January 1977	1
22 January 1977	6	David Soul	David Soul	2	12 February 1977	1
29 January 1977	3	Wings over America	Wings	8	12 February 1977	1
5 February 1977	3	Low	David Bowie	2	5 February 1977	1
5 February 1977	7	Evita	Various artists	4	12 February 1977	2
12 February 1977	16	Endless Flight	Leo Sayer	4	26 February 1977	2
19 February 1977	14	20 Golden Greats	The Shadows	1	19 February 1977	6
19 February 1977	11	Animals	Pink Floyd	2	19 February 1977	3
19 February 1977	1	Motorvatin': 22 Rock 'n' Roll Classics	Chuck Berry	7	19 February 1977	1
19 February 1977	8	20 Great Heartbreakers	Various artists	2	12 March 1977	2
26 February 1977	3	Dance to the Music	Various artists	5	26 February 1977	1
5 March 1977	41	Rumours ♦	Fleetwood Mac	1	28 January 1978	1
12 March 1977	4	Live!	Status Quo	3	19 March 1977	1
12 March 1977	3	In Your Mind	Bryan Ferry	5	12 March 1977	2
12 March 1977	6	Peter Gabriel 1 (Car)	Peter Gabriel	7	12 March 1977	1
26 March 1977	8	Portrait of Sinatra – Forty Songs from the Life of a Man	Frank Sinatra	1	2 April 1977	2
26 March 1977	6	Hollies Live Hits	The Hollies	4	9 April 1977	2
2 April 1977	2	Every Face Tells a Story	Cliff Richard	8	2 April 1977	2
9 April 1977	1	The Best of John Denver Volume 2	John Denver	9	9 April 1977	1
16 April 1977	3	The Unforgettable Glenn Miller	Glenn Miller	4	16 April 1977	2
16 April 1977	2	Works Volume 1	Emerson, Lake & Palmer	9	16 April 1977	1
30 April 1977	5	Greatest Hits	Smokie	6	14 May 1977	1
7 May 1977	17	Rattus Norvegicus (The Stranglers IV)	The Stranglers	4	7 May 1977	1
7 May 1977	23	A Star Is Born	Barbra Streisand & Kris Kristofferson	1	2 July 1977	2
21 May 1977	8	Deceptive Bends	10cc	3	21 May 1977	2
21 May 1977	9	The Beatles at the Hollywood Bowl	The Beatles	1	18 June 1977	1
28 May 1977	2	Time Loves a Hero	Little Feat	8	28 May 1977	1
4 June 1977	5	Sheer Magic	Mr. Acker Bilk	5	11 June 1977	1
4 June 1977	1	All to Yourself	Jack Jones	10	4 June 1977	1
11 June 1977	8	The Muppet Show	The Muppets	1	25 June 1977	1
11 June 1977	1	Sneakin' Suspicion	Dr. Feelgood	10	25 June 1977	1
18 June 1977	13	The Mathis Collection	Johnny Mathis	1	16 July 1977	4
25 June 1977	7	Exodus	Bob Marley and the Wailers	8	2 July 1977	1
9 July 1977	7	Love at the Greek	Neil Diamond	3	6 August 1977	1
23 July 1977	8	I Remember Yesterday	Donna Summer	3	23 July 1977	1
23 July 1977	2	The Best of The Mamas & the Papas	The Mamas & the Papas	6	23 July 1977	1
30 July 1977	13	Going for the One	Yes	1	13 August 1977	2
30 July 1977	10	20 All Time Greats	Connie Francis	1	27 August 1977	2
6 August 1977	2	On Stage	Rainbow	7	6 August 1977	1
6 August 1977	1	Live! In The Air Age	Be-Bop Deluxe	10	6 August 1977	1
27 August 1977	11	Oxygène	Jean-Michel Jarre	2	3 September 1977	5
3 September 1977	4	Elvis' 40 Greatest	Elvis Presley	1	10 September 1977	1
3 September 1977	8	Moody Blue	Elvis Presley	3	24 September 1977	2
10 September 1977	1	Welcome to My World	Elvis Presley	7	10 September 1977	1
17 September 1977	14	20 Golden Greats	Diana Ross & the Supremes	1	17 September 1977	7
24 September 1977	2	Playing to an Audience of One	David Soul	8	24 September 1977	1
1 October 1977	1	Show Some Emotion	Joan Armatrading	6	1 October 1977	1
1 October 1977	1	The Very Best of Frankie Laine	Frankie Laine	7	1 October 1977	1
8 October 1977	3	Love You Live	The Rolling Stones	3	8 October 1977	1
8 October 1977	2	Bad Reputation	Thin Lizzy	4	8 October 1977	1
8 October 1977	3	Aja	Steely Dan	5	15 October 1977	1
8 October 1977	6	No More Heroes	The Stranglers	2	15 October 1977	1
22 October 1977	3	Home on the Range	Slim Whitman	2	22 October 1977	1
22 October 1977	7	40 Golden Greats	Cliff Richard	1	5 November 1977	1
29 October 1977	3	Seconds Out	Genesis	4	5 November 1977	1
29 October 1977	3	Thunder in My Heart	Leo Sayer	8	5 November 1977	1
5 November 1977	3	"Heroes"	David Bowie	3	5 November 1977	1
5 November 1977	1	Bing Crosby Live at the London Palladium	Bing Crosby	9	5 November 1977	1
12 November 1977	10	Never Mind the Bollocks, Here's the Sex Pistols	Sex Pistols	1	12 November 1977	2
12 November 1977	17	The Sound of Bread, Their 20 Finest Songs	Bread	1	26 November 1977	3
12 November 1977	4	Moonflower	Santana	7	26 November 1977	1
19 November 1977	16	Foot Loose & Fancy Free	Rod Stewart	3	19 November 1977	2
19 November 1977	8	News of the World	Queen	4	19 November 1977	1
19 November 1977	17	Out of the Blue	Electric Light Orchestra	4	26 November 1977	1
26 November 1977	4	Rockin' All Over the World	Status Quo	5	3 December 1977	1
26 November 1977	8	30 Greatest	Gladys Knight & the Pips	3	17 December 1977	1
3 December 1977	13	Disco Fever	Various artists	1	10 December 1977	6
3 December 1977	7	Feelings ♦	Various artists	3	7 January 1978	1
10 December 1977	1	20 Golden Greats	The George Mitchell Minstrels	10	10 December 1977	1
17 December 1977	4	Greatest Hits, Etc.	Paul Simon	3	24 December 1977	2

== See also ==
- 1977 in British music
- List of number-one albums from the 1970s (UK)
