= List of best-selling albums of the 1970s in the United Kingdom =

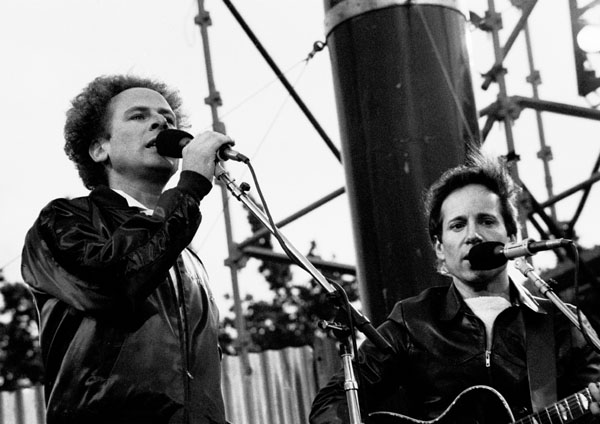
Simon & Garfunkel had the biggest-selling album of the 1970s with Bridge over Troubled Water.

The UK Albums Chart is a weekly record chart based on album sales from Sunday to Saturday in the United Kingdom. Albums are defined by the Official Charts Company (OCC) as being a type of music release that features more than four tracks and lasts longer than 25 minutes. During the 1970s, sales of albums in the United Kingdom were compiled on behalf of the British music industry by the British Market Research Bureau (BMRB). Panel sales from approximately 250 (later expanded to 450) representative record stores across the UK were collected each week, and a multiplier figure would then be applied to these panel sales figures to obtain an estimate of the total sales across the country and to compile the weekly chart. Each week's number one was first revealed at 12.45 pm on Thursdays on the lunchtime show on BBC Radio 1, and then moved to 6:05 pm (later 6:30 pm) on Wednesday evenings during the Peter Powell and Bruno Brookes shows.

The official charts of the best-selling singles and albums of the 1970s were compiled by BMRB and published in Music Week in the issue dated 22 December 1979, and the top 100 singles and albums were counted down throughout the day on Radio 1 on 31 December 1979, playing one track from each of the top 100 albums. As the charts had to be compiled before the end of the year, the cut-off date for collection of sales data was 8 December 1979.

The biggest-selling album of the 1970s in the UK was Bridge over Troubled Water by American duo Simon & Garfunkel. Released on 6 February 1970, it spent a total of 33 weeks at number one, and was the best-selling album of both 1970 and 1971. Originally it was credited with 41 weeks at number one, but this figure includes eight weeks in February and March 1971 when no charts were published due to a postal strike which prevented collection of sales data, and the chart of 30 January 1971 was reused during this period. In 2006 the OCC decided that the rival Melody Maker album chart would replace the missing weeks, with George Harrison's All Things Must Pass at number one during that period.

Although it was not an immediate big seller at the time and therefore does not appear in this list, Bat Out of Hell by Meat Loaf has since gone on to become one of the UK's best-selling albums. Released in the UK in February 1978, the album has only ever spent four weeks in the top ten of the album chart, two of them in 1981 in the wake of Meat Loaf's follow-up album Dead Ringer, and the other two in 2013 following Bat Out of Hell's repackaging and re-release along with the Hits Out of Hell DVD. On both occasions the album peaked at number nine. However, Bat Out of Hell sold consistently for several years following its release, and has spent more than 500 weeks on the UK album chart, a total that, for a studio album, is bettered only by Fleetwood Mac's Rumours. As of February 2014 Bat Out of Hell is the 19th best-selling album of all time in the UK, and the third best-selling album released during the 1970s, behind Rumours and The Dark Side of the Moon and ahead of Bridge Over Troubled Water in fourth place.

BMRB's methodology and data collection system have been criticised by other chart statisticians. However, while other chart compilers have produced their own versions of the equivalent 1970s singles chart, BMRB's list remains the only chart of the best-selling albums of the 1970s.

No.	Album	Artist	Record label (Note: The record labels, dates and chart peaks are those given by the OCC.)	Released	Chart peak
1	Bridge over Troubled Water	Simon and Garfunkel	CBS	1970	1
2	Greatest Hits	ABBA	Epic	1976	1
3	Tubular Bells	Mike Oldfield	Virgin	1973	1
4	Simon and Garfunkel's Greatest Hits	Simon and Garfunkel	CBS	1972	2
5	Saturday Night Fever	Original Soundtrack	RSO	1977	1
6	The Singles: 1969–1973	The Carpenters	A&M	1974	1
7	Arrival	ABBA	Epic	1976	1
8	The Dark Side of the Moon	Pink Floyd	Harvest	1973	2
9	Grease	Original Soundtrack	RSO	1978	1
10	40 Greatest Hits	Elvis Presley	Arcade	1974 (Note: 40 Greatest Hits was originally released in November 1974, but due to chart regulations at the time which excluded television-advertised albums, it did not chart until the regulations were lifted in July 1975. The album finally made number 1 on the UK Albums Chart in September 1977, following Presley's death.)	1
11	20 Golden Greats	The Beach Boys	Capitol	1976	1
12	Band on the Run	Paul McCartney and Wings	Apple	1973	1
13	Rumours	Fleetwood Mac	Warner Bros.	1977	1
14	The Best of The Stylistics	The Stylistics	Avco	1975	1
15	Parallel Lines	Blondie	Chrysalis	1978	1
16	Atlantic Crossing	Rod Stewart	Riva	1975	1
17	20 Golden Greats	The Shadows	EMI	1977	1
18	20 Golden Greats	Diana Ross & The Supremes	Motown	1977	1
19	Greatest Hits	Elton John	DJM	1974	1
20	ABBA: The Album	ABBA	Epic	1978	1
21	A Night at the Opera	Queen	EMI	1975	1
22	Aladdin Sane	David Bowie	RCA	1973	1
23	Their Greatest Hits (1971–1975)	The Eagles	Asylum	1976	2
24	Out of the Blue	Electric Light Orchestra	Jet	1977	4
25	Nightflight to Venus	Boney M.	Atlantic	1978	1
26	20 Dynamic Hits	Various Artists	K-tel	1972	1
27	1967–1970	The Beatles	Apple	1973	2
28	Hotel California	The Eagles	Asylum	1976	2
29	40 Greatest Hits	Perry Como	K-tel	1975	1
30	Goodbye Yellow Brick Road	Elton John	DJM	1973	1
31	A Star Is Born	Barbra Streisand/Kris Kristofferson	CBS	1976	1
32	1962–1966	The Beatles	Apple	1973	3
33	Forever and Ever	Demis Roussos	Philips	1973	2
34	Wish You Were Here	Pink Floyd	Harvest	1975	1
35	And I Love You So	Perry Como	RCA Victor	1973	1
36	Songs in the Key of Life	Stevie Wonder	Motown	1976	2
37	Once Upon a Star	The Bay City Rollers	Bell	1975	1
38	Disco Fever	Various Artists	K-tel	1977	1
39	A New World Record	Electric Light Orchestra	Jet	1976	6
40	20 All Time Greats of the 50's	Various Artists	K-tel	1972	1
41	Jeff Wayne's Musical Version of The War of the Worlds	Jeff Wayne	CBS	1978	5
42	The Rise and Fall of Ziggy Stardust and the Spiders from Mars	David Bowie	RCA	1972	5
43	Never Mind the Bollocks, Here's the Sex Pistols	Sex Pistols	Virgin	1977	1
44	Rollin'	The Bay City Rollers	Bell	1974	1
45	Glen Campbell's Twenty Golden Greats	Glen Campbell	EMI	1976	1
46	Discovery	Electric Light Orchestra	Jet	1979	1
47	Imagine	John Lennon	Apple	1971	1
48	The Very Best of Leo Sayer	Leo Sayer	Chrysalis	1979	1
49	40 Golden Greats	Jim Reeves	Arcade	1975	1
50	Endless Flight	Leo Sayer	Chrysalis	1976	4
