= List of UK top-ten albums in 1976 =

The UK Albums Chart is one of many music charts compiled by the Official Charts Company that calculates the best-selling albums of the week in the United Kingdom. Before 2004, the chart was only based on the sales of physical albums. This list shows albums that peaked in the top ten of the UK Albums Chart during 1976, as well as albums which peaked in 1975 and 1977 but were in the top ten in 1976. The entry date is when the album appeared in the top ten for the first time (week ending, as published by the Official Charts Company, which is six days after the chart is announced).

The first new number-one album of the year was by The Best of Roy Orbison by Roy Orbison. Overall, fourteen different albums peaked at number one in 1976, with Led Zeppelin (2) having the most albums hit that position.

== Top-ten albums ==
Key

Symbol	Meaning
‡	Album peaked in 1975 but still in chart in 1976.
♦	Album released in 1976 but peaked in 1977.
Entered	The date that the album first appeared in the chart.
Peak	Highest position that the album reached in the UK Albums Chart.

Entered (week ending)	Weeks in top 10	Single	Artist	Peak	Peak reached (week ending)	Weeks at peak
Albums in 1975
12 April 1975	32	The Best of the Stylistics ‡	The Stylistics	1	19 April 1975	9
30 August 1975	24	Atlantic Crossing ‡	Rod Stewart	1	30 August 1975	7
4 October 1975	16	Favourites ‡	Peters and Lee	2	1 November 1975	2
18 October 1975	14	40 Golden Greats ‡	Jim Reeves	1	25 October 1975	3
8 November 1975	15	40 Greatest Hits ‡	Perry Como	1	22 November 1975	6
22 November 1975	9	Ommadawn ‡	Mike Oldfield	4	22 November 1975	2
29 November 1975	9	Make the Party Last – 25 All Time Party Greats ‡	James Last	3	6 December 1975	3
13 December 1975	12	A Night at the Opera ‡	Queen	1	27 December 1975	4
13 December 1975	7	Wouldn't You Like It	Bay City Rollers	3	17 January 1976	1
13 December 1975	5	Songs of Joy ‡	The Nigel Brooks Singers	5	20 December 1975	1
20 December 1975	11	24 Original Hits	The Drifters	2	24 January 1976	1
Albums in 1976
17 January 1976	1	40 Super Greats	Various artists	9	17 January 1976	1
24 January 1976	10	The Best of Roy Orbison	Roy Orbison	1	31 January 1976	1
24 January 1976	3	Still Crazy After All These Years	Paul Simon	6	24 January 1976	1
31 January 1976	11	Desire	Bob Dylan	3	7 February 1976	2
31 January 1976	11	How Dare You!	10cc	5	31 January 1976	2
31 January 1976	1	Star Trackin' 76	Various artists	9	31 January 1976	1
31 January 1976	1	Sing Lofty	Windsor Davies and Don Estelle	10	31 January 1976	1
7 February 1976	10	The Very Best of Slim Whitman	Slim Whitman	1	7 February 1976	6
7 February 1976	7	Music Express	Various artists	3	14 February 1976	4
7 February 1976	2	Motown Gold	Various artists	8	7 February 1976	2
14 February 1976	3	Station to Station	David Bowie	5	14 February 1976	1
21 February 1976	5	Run with the Pack	Bad Company	4	21 February 1976	1
21 February 1976	6	The Best of Helen Reddy	Helen Reddy	5	6 March 1976	2
28 February 1976	6	A Trick of the Tail	Genesis	3	13 March 1976	1
28 February 1976	7	Carnival	Manuel and The Music of The Mountains	3	20 March 1976	2
13 March 1976	11	Their Greatest Hits (1971–1975)	Eagles	2	20 March 1976	4
20 March 1976	6	Blue for You	Status Quo	1	20 March 1976	3
27 March 1976	2	Breakaway	Gallagher and Lyle	6	27 March 1976	1
27 March 1976	2	The Best of John Denver	John Denver	7	3 April 1976	1
3 April 1976	7	Diana Ross	Diana Ross	4	3 April 1976	2
3 April 1976	1	Brass Construction	Brass Construction	9	3 April 1976	1
3 April 1976	1	Walk Right Back with the Everlys	The Everly Brothers	10	3 April 1976	1
10 April 1976	8	Rock Follies: Original Television Soundtrack	Charlotte Cornwell, Julie Covington and Rula Lenska	1	10 April 1976	3
10 April 1976	7	Juke Box Jive: 40 All Time Rock 'N' Roll Greats	Various artists	3	17 April 1976	2
10 April 1976	3	Rebel	John Miles	9	24 April 1976	1
17 April 1976	21	Wings at the Speed of Sound	Wings	2	17 April 1976	1
17 April 1976	49	Greatest Hits	ABBA	1	8 May 1976	11
17 April 1976	1	Cry Tough	Nils Lofgren	8	17 April 1976	1
24 April 1976	5	Presence	Led Zeppelin	1	24 April 1976	1
1 May 1976	11	Instrumental Gold	Various artists	3	1 May 1976	5
1 May 1976	2	No Earthly Connection	Rick Wakeman	9	15 May 1976	1
8 May 1976	8	Black and Blue	The Rolling Stones	2	15 May 1976	2
22 May 1976	1	Here and There	Elton John	6	22 May 1976	1
22 May 1976	5	Hit Machine	Various artists	4	29 May 1976	2
22 May 1976	9	Live in London	John Denver	2	29 May 1976	5
29 May 1976	2	A Touch of Country	Various artists	7	5 June 1976	1
29 May 1976	6	The Best of Gladys Knight & the Pips	Gladys Knight & the Pips	6	19 June 1976	1
5 June 1976	4	I'm Nearly Famous	Cliff Richard	5	12 June 1976	1
12 June 1976	6	Frampton Comes Alive!	Peter Frampton	6	26 June 1976	1
12 June 1976	11	Changesonebowie	David Bowie	2	24 July 1976	1
3 July 1976	18	A Night on the Town	Rod Stewart	1	10 July 1976	2
3 July 1976	5	Happy to Be...	Demis Roussos	4	3 July 1976	1
3 July 1976	14	Forever and Ever	Demis Roussos	2	7 August 1976	3
3 July 1976	5	A Kind of Hush	The Carpenters	3	10 July 1976	1
10 July 1976	1	King Cotton	Fivepenny Piece	9	10 July 1976	1
17 July 1976	15	20 Golden Greats	The Beach Boys	1	24 July 1976	10
17 July 1976	13	Laughter and Tears – The Best of Neil Sedaka Today	Neil Sedaka	2	31 July 1976	3
17 July 1976	4	Beautiful Noise	Neil Diamond	10	17 July 1976	4
24 July 1976	8	Passport	Nana Mouskouri	3	14 August 1976	1
31 July 1976	1	Olias of Sunhillow	Jon Anderson	8	31 July 1976	1
31 July 1976	8	A Little Bit More	Dr. Hook	5	14 August 1976	2
7 August 1976	3	Viva! Roxy Music	Roxy Music	6	7 August 1976	1
28 August 1976	8	Diana Ross' Greatest Hits 2	Diana Ross	2	11 September 1976	3
4 September 1976	1	Jailbreak	Thin Lizzy	10	4 September 1976	1
18 September 1976	1	No Reason to Cry	Eric Clapton	8	18 September 1976	1
18 September 1976	2	Spirit	John Denver	9	25 September 1976	1
25 September 1976	8	The Best of the Stylistics Vol. 2	The Stylistics	1	2 October 1976	1
2 October 1976	3	Dedication	Bay City Rollers	4	9 October 1976	1
2 October 1976	5	Stupidity	Dr. Feelgood	1	9 October 1976	1
9 October 1976	1	The Roaring Silence	Manfred Mann's Earth Band	10	9 October 1976	1
16 October 1976	2	Hard Rain	Bob Dylan	3	16 October 1976	1
16 October 1976	6	The Story of The Who	The Who	2	23 October 1976	1
23 October 1976	19	Songs in the Key of Life	Stevie Wonder	2	30 October 1976	3
23 October 1976	7	Soul Motion	Various artists	1	30 October 1976	2
23 October 1976	2	Country Comfort	Various artists	8	30 October 1976	1
30 October 1976	2	His 20 Greatest Hits	Gene Pitney	6	30 October 1976	2
6 November 1976	4	The Song Remains the Same	Led Zeppelin	1	13 November 1976	1
6 November 1976	8	22 Golden Guitar Greats	Bert Weedon	1	20 November 1976	1
6 November 1976	1	L	Steve Hillage	10	6 November 1976	1
13 November 1976	2	Blue Moves	Elton John	3	13 November 1976	1
13 November 1976	9	100 Golden Greats	Max Bygraves	3	27 November 1976	3
20 November 1976	10	Glen Campbell's Twenty Golden Greats	Glen Campbell	1	27 November 1976	6
20 November 1976	4	20 Original Dean Martin Hits	Dean Martin	7	20 November 1976	3
20 November 1976	2	The Incredible Plan	Max Boyce	9	27 November 1976	1
27 November 1976	34	Arrival ♦	ABBA	1	15 January 1977	10
27 November 1976	2	XIV Greatest Hits	Hot Chocolate	6	4 December 1976	1
4 December 1976	7	The Greatest Hits	Frankie Valli and The Four Seasons	4	11 December 1976	2
4 December 1976	1	Sound of Glory	London Philharmonic Choir	10	4 December 1976	1
11 December 1976	6	Disco Rocket	Various artists	3	18 December 1976	1
11 December 1976	9	A New World Record ♦	Electric Light Orchestra	6	25 June 1977	1
25 December 1976	22	Hotel California ♦	Eagles	2	14 May 1977	4
25 December 1976	6	A Day at the Races ♦	Queen	1	8 January 1977	1

== See also ==
- 1976 in British music
- List of number-one albums from the 1970s (UK)
