= List of posthumous number ones on the UK Albums Chart =

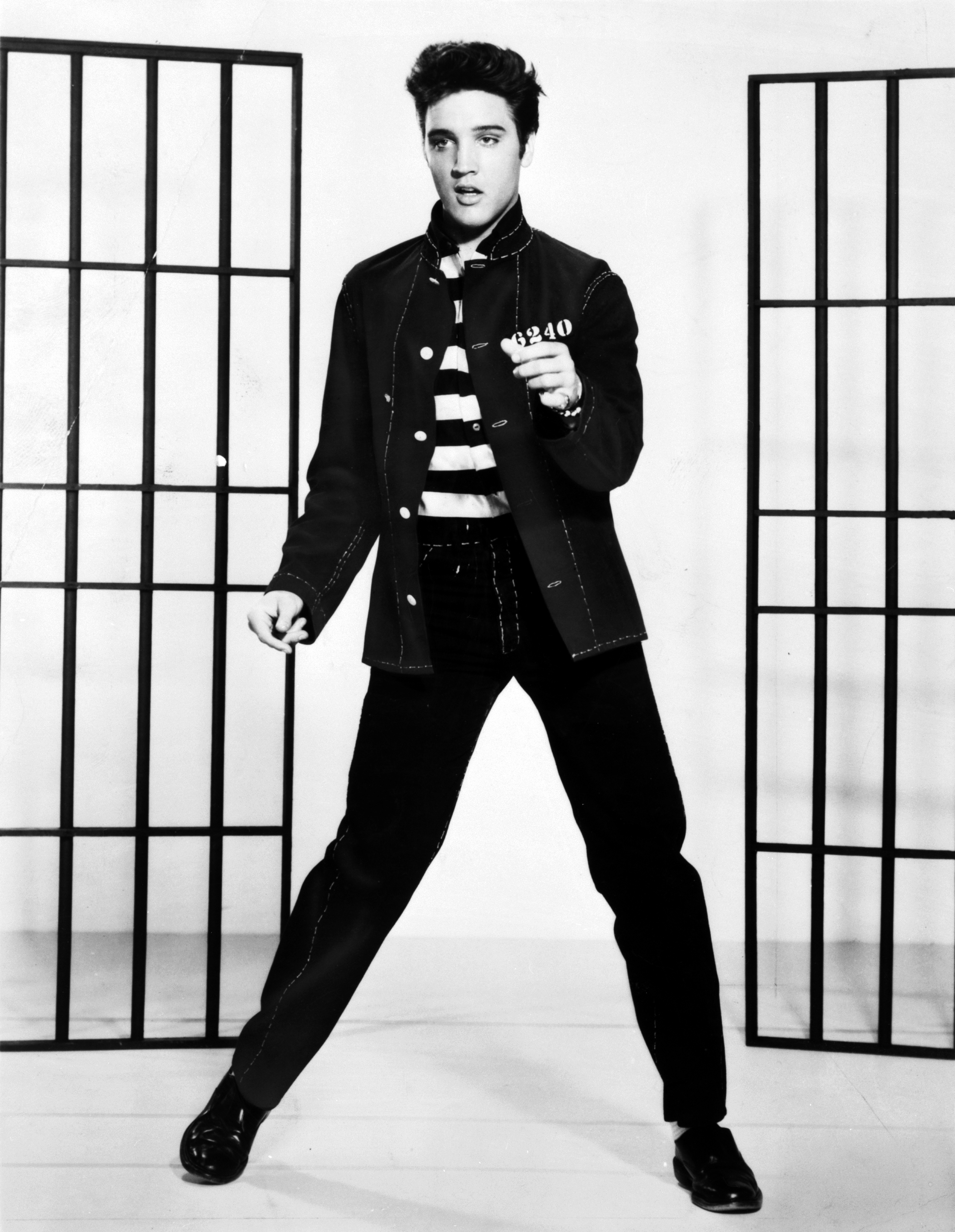
Elvis Presley has achieved five posthumous number ones on the UK Albums Chart, more than any other artist.

The UK Albums Chart is a weekly record chart based on sales of albums in the United Kingdom. The first weekly albums chart in the UK was published by Record Mirror in July 1956 – since then, 29 albums by deceased artists have posthumously reached number one. Until 2007, the chart was based solely on sales of physical albums; from 2007 onwards, it has also included albums sold through digital distribution. As of April 2016, the listing is created using Friday to Thursday record sales from more than 3,500 vendors across the UK. It is compiled by the Official Charts Company on behalf of the UK music industry, and each week's new number one is first announced on Friday evenings on The Radio 1 Chart Show.

The first deceased artist to top the UK Albums Chart was Otis Redding, who died in a plane crash on 10 December 1967. On 20 May 1968, Redding's sixth studio album, The Dock of the Bay, was released in the UK – three weeks later, it became his first and only UK number-one album. Since Redding, 14 further artists have posthumously topped the albums chart, of which three have done so more than twice. The first of these was American singer Eva Cassidy; after dying in 1996, three posthumous releases from Cassidy reached number one in consecutive years, 2001–03. The second musician to achieve this feat was American entertainer Elvis Presley. Following his death from a heart attack in August 1977, Presley's compilation album 40 Greatest climbed to number one within three weeks. Subsequent compilations ELV1S (2002), The King (2007), If I Can Dream (2015) and The Wonder of You (2016) also topped the chart. With If I Can Dream, Presley achieved his fourth posthumous number one, more than any other artist.

The death of a musician can often result in an immediate increase in sales of their albums. As UK chart commentator James Masterton remarked in December 1995: "Death is very commercial." Following his death in 2009, the number of purchases of Michael Jackson's albums grew significantly worldwide. In the UK, sales of the singer's albums increased by more than 80 times in a single day. On 28 June, Jackson's 2003 release Number Ones climbed 120 places to the top of the chart; the following week, his 2005 compilation The Essential Michael Jackson reached number one. The two albums spent a combined total of eight weeks at number one. Five of Jackson's records were featured in the top twenty biggest-selling albums of 2009's third quarter, and sales of his albums during the year lifted Warner/Chappell Music's share of the albums market to its highest level in nearly six years. In May 2014, Jackson's album Xscape topped the chart, making him the third musician to top the listing with three posthumous releases. Twelve years later, The Essential Michael Jackson returned to number one following the release of the musical biopic Michael.

Like Jackson, British singer Amy Winehouse received a significant increase in sales after her death in 2011, when purchases of her albums grew 37 times over. This resulted in her 2006 album, Back to Black, returning to the top of the UK Albums Chart for three weeks and becoming the UK's biggest-selling album of the 21st century for three months before being overtaken by 21 by Adele. Four months later, Winehouse's first compilation album, Lioness: Hidden Treasures, became her second release to posthumously reach number one. Over the year following her death, 1.2 million copies of Winehouse's albums were sold.

== Number ones ==
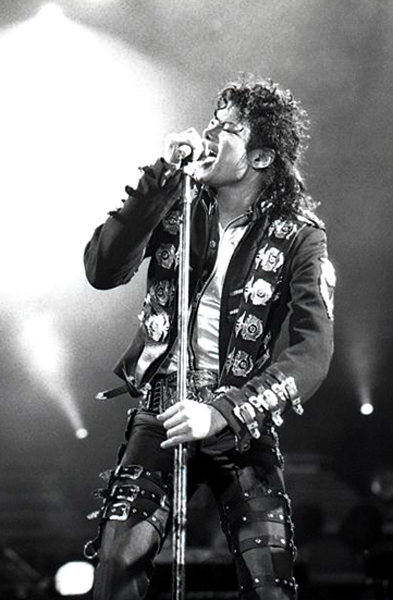
After the death of Michael Jackson, the singer's 2003 album Number Ones climbed 120 places to the top of the chart.

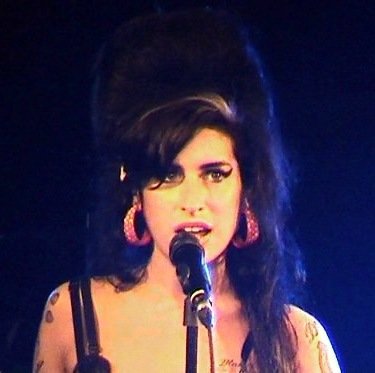
In the year following her death, 1.2 million copies of Amy Winehouse's albums were sold.

The following albums were all explicitly credited (either wholly or partially) to deceased artists when they reached number one on the UK Albums Chart. Albums featuring deceased artists who did not receive an explicit credit (e.g. as a member of a band or on a various artist compilation album or soundtrack) are not included.

Artist	Album	Record label	Date of death	Reached number one (for the week ending)	Weeks at number one	Ref.
Otis Redding	The Dock of the Bay	Stax	10 December 1967	22 June 1968	1	
Jim Reeves	According to My Heart	RCA International	31 July 1964	12 July 1969	4	
Jim Reeves	40 Golden Greats	Arcade	31 July 1964	25 October 1975	3	
Elvis Presley	Elvis' 40 Greatest	Arcade	16 August 1977	10 September 1977	1	
Buddy Holly	20 Golden Greats (Note: Credited to Buddy Holly & The Crickets)	EMI	3 February 1959	25 March 1978	3	
Nat King Cole	20 Golden Greats	Capitol	15 February 1965	15 April 1978	3	
John Lennon	Double Fantasy (Note: Credited to John Lennon & Yoko Ono)	Geffen	8 December 1980	7 February 1981	2	
John Lennon	The John Lennon Collection	Parlophone	8 December 1980	4 December 1982	6	
Roy Orbison	The Legendary Roy Orbison	Telstar	6 December 1988	21 January 1989	3	
Buddy Holly	Words of Love	PolyGram TV/MCA	3 February 1959	20 February 1993	1	
Eva Cassidy	Songbird	Blix Street/Hot	2 November 1996	24 March 2001	2	
Eva Cassidy	Imagine	Blix Street/Hot	2 November 1996	31 August 2002	1	
Elvis Presley	ELV1S: 30 No. 1 Hits	RCA	16 August 1977	5 October 2002	2	
Eva Cassidy	American Tune	Blix Street/Hot	2 November 1996	23 August 2003	2	
Elvis Presley	The King	RCA	16 August 1977	25 August 2007	1	
Michael Jackson	Number Ones	Epic	25 June 2009	4 July 2009	1	
Michael Jackson	The Essential Michael Jackson	Epic	25 June 2009	11 July 2009	9	
Amy Winehouse	Back to Black	Island	23 July 2011	6 August 2011	3	
Amy Winehouse	Lioness: Hidden Treasures	Island	23 July 2011	17 December 2011	1	
Michael Jackson	Xscape	Epic	25 June 2009	24 May 2014	1	
Cilla Black	The Very Best of Cilla Black	Parlophone	1 August 2015	27 August 2015	1	
Elvis Presley	If I Can Dream (Note: Credited to Elvis with the Royal Philharmonic Orchestra)	RCA/Legacy	16 August 1977	12 November 2015	2	
David Bowie	Blackstar	Columbia/ISO	10 January 2016	21 January 2016	3	
David Bowie	Best of Bowie	EMI	10 January 2016	11 February 2016	1	
Viola Beach	Viola Beach	Fuller Beans	14 February 2016	11 August 2016	1	
Elvis Presley	The Wonder of You	RCA/Legacy	16 August 1977	3 November 2016	1	
George Michael	Listen Without Prejudice Vol. 1	Sony	25 December 2016	27 October 2017	1	
Juice Wrld	Legends Never Die	Interscope	8 December 2019	23 July 2020	1	
Pop Smoke	Shoot for the Stars, Aim for the Moon	Republic	19 February 2020	1 October 2020	1	
