= List of UK top-ten albums in 1978 =

The UK Albums Chart is one of many music charts compiled by the Official Charts Company that calculates the best-selling albums of the week in the United Kingdom. Before 2004, the chart was only based on the sales of physical albums. This list shows albums that peaked in the Top 10 of the UK Albums Chart during 1978, as well as albums which peaked in 1977 and 1979 but were in the top 10 in 1978. The entry date is when the album appeared in the top ten for the first time (week ending, as published by the Official Charts Company, which is six days after the chart is announced).

The first new number-one album of the year was by ABBA: The Album by ABBA. Overall, seven different albums peaked at number one in 1978.

== Top-ten albums ==
Key

Symbol	Meaning
‡	Album peaked in 1977 but still in chart in 1978.
♦	Album released in 1978 but peaked in 1979.
Entered	The date that the album first appeared in the chart.
Peak	Highest position that the album reached in the UK Albums Chart.

Entered (week ending)	Weeks in top 10	Single	Artist	Peak	Peak reached (week ending)	Weeks at peak
Albums in 1977
5 March 1977	41	Rumours	Fleetwood Mac	1	28 January 1978	1
17 September 1977	14	20 Golden Greats ‡	Diana Ross & the Supremes	1	17 September 1977	7
12 November 1977	10	Never Mind the Bollocks, Here's the Sex Pistols ‡	Sex Pistols	1	12 November 1977	2
12 November 1977	17	The Sound of Bread, Their 20 Finest Songs ‡	Bread	1	26 November 1977	3
19 November 1977	16	Foot Loose & Fancy Free ‡	Rod Stewart	3	19 November 1977	2
19 November 1977	8	News of the World ‡	Queen	4	19 November 1977	1
19 November 1977	17	Out of the Blue ‡	Electric Light Orchestra	4	26 November 1977	1
26 November 1977	8	30 Greatest ‡	Gladys Knight & the Pips	3	17 December 1977	1
3 December 1977	13	Disco Fever ‡	Various artists	1	10 December 1977	6
3 December 1977	7	Feelings	Various artists	3	7 January 1978	1
17 December 1977	4	Greatest Hits, Etc. ‡	Paul Simon	3	24 December 1977	2
Albums in 1978
7 January 1978	5	20 Country Classics	Tammy Wynette	3	14 January 1978	1
7 January 1978	1	Get Stoned — The Rolling Stones 30 Greatest Hits	The Rolling Stones	8	7 January 1978	1
14 January 1978	8	The Greatest Hits of Donna Summer	Donna Summer	4	28 January 1978	2
21 January 1978	3	Elton John's Greatest Hits Volume II	Elton John	6	21 January 1978	1
21 January 1978	5	Love Songs	The Beatles	7	28 January 1978	1
28 January 1978	11	Reflections	Andy Williams	2	4 March 1978	1
4 February 1978	25	ABBA: The Album	ABBA	1	4 February 1978	7
11 February 1978	2	The Floral Dance	Brighouse and Rastrick Brass Band	10	11 February 1978	2
18 February 1978	6	Variations	Andrew Lloyd Webber	2	25 February 1978	1
4 March 1978	11	New Boots and Panties!! ♦	Ian Dury and the Blockheads	5	10 February 1979	1
4 March 1978	2	Darts	Darts	9	11 March 1978	1
11 March 1978	8	Buddy Holly Lives — 20 Golden Greats	Buddy Holly and The Crickets	1	25 March 1978	3
11 March 1978	2	Disco Stars	Various artists	6	11 March 1978	1
11 March 1978	3	25 Thumping Great Hits	The Dave Clark Five	7	1 April 1978	1
18 March 1978	2	Boogie Nights	Various artists	5	18 March 1978	1
18 March 1978	14	The Kick Inside	Kate Bush	3	1 April 1978	3
18 March 1978	8	City to City	Gerry Rafferty	6	1 April 1978	1
25 March 1978	4	Fonzie's Favourites	Various artists	8	25 March 1978	1
1 April 1978	3	This Year's Model	Elvis Costello and The Attractions	4	1 April 1978	1
1 April 1978	1	Plastic Letters	Blondie	10	1 April 1978	1
8 April 1978	4	Kaya	Bob Marley and the Wailers	4	8 April 1978	1
8 April 1978	10	20 Golden Greats	Nat King Cole	1	15 April 1978	3
15 April 1978	9	...And Then There Were Three...	Genesis	3	22 April 1978	4
15 April 1978	7	London Town	Wings	4	22 April 1978	3
15 April 1978	29	Saturday Night Fever: The Original Movie Sound Track	Bee Gees and Various artists	1	6 May 1978	18
29 April 1978	1	Adventure	Television	7	29 April 1978	1
29 April 1978	10	The Stud: 20 Smash Hits from the Original Film Soundtrack	Various artists	2	20 May 1978	2
6 May 1978	3	Long Live Rock 'n' Roll	Rainbow	7	6 May 1978	1
6 May 1978	10	You Light Up My Life	Johnny Mathis	3	27 May 1978	3
6 May 1978	2	Pennies from Heaven: 48 Original Recordings Featured in the BBC TV Serial	Various artists	10	6 May 1978	2
13 May 1978	2	20 Classic Hits	The Platters	8	13 May 1978	1
20 May 1978	4	Twenty Golden Greats	Frank Sinatra	4	27 May 1978	1
27 May 1978	3	Anytime...Anywhere	Rita Coolidge	7	27 May 1978	2
3 June 1978	4	Black and White	The Stranglers	2	3 June 1978	2
3 June 1978	5	I Know 'Cos I was There!! (Live in Concert)	Max Boyce	6	10 June 1978	2
10 June 1978	3	Power in the Darkness	Tom Robinson Band	4	10 June 1978	1
17 June 1978	10	Live and Dangerous	Thin Lizzy	2	24 June 1978	3
17 June 1978	1	Disco Double	Various artists	10	17 June 1978	1
24 June 1978	1	Peter Gabriel 2 (Scratch)	Peter Gabriel	10	24 June 1978	1
1 July 1978	6	Some Girls	The Rolling Stones	2	1 July 1978	1
1 July 1978	5	Octave	The Moody Blues	6	1 July 1978	2
8 July 1978	9	Street-Legal	Bob Dylan	2	8 July 1978	1
8 July 1978	1	Pastiche	The Manhattan Transfer	10	8 July 1978	1
15 July 1978	5	A Tonic for the Troops	The Boomtown Rats	8	15 July 1978	2
15 July 1978	20	Jeff Wayne's Musical Version of The War of the Worlds	Jeff Wayne	5	9 September 1978	4
22 July 1978	7	The Hollies: 20 Golden Greats	The Hollies	2	29 July 1978	3
29 July 1978	28	Grease: The Original Soundtrack from the Motion Picture	John Travolta, Olivia Newton-John and Various artists	1	7 October 1978	13
5 August 1978	26	Nightflight to Venus	Boney M.	1	9 September 1978	4
12 August 1978	5	20 Giant Hits	The Nolan Sisters	3	12 August 1978	3
12 August 1978	1	Handsworth Revolution	Steel Pulse	9	12 August 1978	1
19 August 1978	13	Images	Don Williams	2	23 September 1978	4
26 August 1978	4	Star Party	Various artists	4	26 August 1978	2
26 August 1978	11	Classic Rock	The London Symphony Orchestra	3	9 September 1978	3
2 September 1978	3	Natural High	Commodores	8	2 September 1978	2
9 September 1978	3	Who Are You	The Who	6	9 September 1978	1
9 September 1978	4	James Galway Plays Songs for Annie	James Galway	7	16 September 1978	2
16 September 1978	2	Don't Look Back	Boston	9	23 September 1978	1
23 September 1978	5	Bloody Tourists	10cc	3	30 September 1978	1
23 September 1978	37	Parallel Lines ♦	Blondie	1	17 February 1979	4
7 October 1978	2	Tormato	Yes	8	14 October 1978	1
14 October 1978	6	The Big Wheels of Motown	Various artists	2	21 October 1978	3
14 October 1978	2	Stage	David Bowie	5	14 October 1978	1
21 October 1978	3	Rose Royce III: Strikes Again	Rose Royce	7	21 October 1978	3
28 October 1978	3	Twenty Greatest	Brotherhood of Man	6	4 November 1978	1
28 October 1978	1	Satin City	Various artists	10	28 October 1978	1
11 November 1978	2	If You Can't Stand the Heat...	Status Quo	3	11 November 1978	1
11 November 1978	8	Emotions	Various artists	2	18 November 1978	1
11 November 1978	4	25th Anniversary Album	Shirley Bassey	3	18 November 1978	1
11 November 1978	8	A Single Man ♦	Elton John	8	20 January 1979	1
18 November 1978	1	All Mod Cons	The Jam	6	18 November 1978	1
25 November 1978	2	Give 'Em Enough Rope	The Clash	2	25 November 1978	1
25 November 1978	2	The Manhattan Transfer Live	The Manhattan Transfer	4	25 November 1978	1
25 November 1978	8	20 Golden Greats	Neil Diamond	2	9 December 1978	1
2 December 1978	5	Jazz	Queen	2	2 December 1978	1
2 December 1978	3	Lionheart	Kate Bush	6	2 December 1978	1
2 December 1978	7	Midnight Hustle ♦	Various artists	2	13 January 1979	1
9 December 1978	12	Blondes Have More Fun	Rod Stewart	3	9 December 1978	4
9 December 1978	8	The Singles: 1974–1978	The Carpenters	2	16 December 1978	3
16 December 1978	3	Amazing Darts	Darts	8	16 December 1978	1
23 December 1978	6	Greatest Hits (1976-1978) ♦	Showaddywaddy	1	6 January 1979	2
23 December 1978	3	20 Songs of Joy	Harry Secombe	8	23 December 1978	3

== See also ==
- 1978 in British music
- List of number-one albums from the 1970s (UK)
