= 20 Golden Greats =

20 Golden Greats may refer to:

- 20 Golden Greats (The Beach Boys album), 1976
- 20 Golden Greats (The Shadows album), 1977
- 20 Golden Greats (Buddy Holly & The Crickets album), 1978
- 20 Golden Greats (Nat King Cole album), 1978
- 20 Golden Greats (Creedence Clearwater Revival album), 1979
- 20 Golden Greats (Diana Ross album), 1979
- Glen Campbell's Twenty Golden Greats, 1976
- Diana Ross & the Supremes: 20 Golden Greats (The Supremes album), 1977
- The Hollies: 20 Golden Greats 1978
- 20 Golden Greats (Gary Lewis & The Playboys album)
