= Golden Greats =

Golden Greats may refer to:

- Golden Greats, an album by Charlie Pride
- Cher's Golden Greats, a compilation album by American singer Cher
- Golden Greats, an album by Gary Glitter
- Golden Greats, an album by Golden Earring
- Golden Greats (Ian Brown album), second solo album by Ian Brown, the ex-frontman of The Stone Roses
- Golden Greats, an album by Kenny Rogers
- The Golden Greats, a compilation album by Sweet
- Golden Greats, an album by The Ventures

== See also ==
- 20 Golden Greats (disambiguation)
- 40 Golden Greats (disambiguation)
