= List of UK top-ten albums in 1979 =

The UK Albums Chart is one of many music charts compiled by the Official Charts Company that calculates the best-selling albums of the week in the United Kingdom. Before 2004, the chart was only based on the sales of physical albums. This list shows albums that peaked in the Top 10 of the UK Albums Chart during 1979, as well as albums which peaked in 1978 and 1980 but were in the top 10 in 1979. The entry date is when the album appeared in the top ten for the first time (week ending, as published by the Official Charts Company, which is six days after the chart is announced).

The first new number-one album of the year was by Greatest Hits (1976-1978) by Showaddywaddy. Overall, eighteen different albums peaked at number one in 1979, with ABBA, Blondie and Gary Numan each having two albums hit that position.

== Top-ten albums ==
Key

Symbol	Meaning
‡	Album peaked in 1978 but still in chart in 1979.
♦	Album released in 1979 but peaked in 1980.
Entered	The date that the album first appeared in the chart.
Peak	Highest position that the album reached in the UK Albums Chart.

Entered (week ending)	Weeks in top 10	Single	Artist	Peak	Peak reached (week ending)	Weeks at peak
Albums in 1978
4 March 1978	11	New Boots and Panties!!	Ian Dury and the Blockheads	5	10 February 1979	1
15 July 1978	5	A Tonic for the Troops ‡	The Boomtown Rats	8	15 July 1978	2
29 July 1978	28	Grease: The Original Soundtrack from the Motion Picture ‡	John Travolta, Olivia Newton-John and Various artists	1	7 October 1978	13
5 August 1978	26	Nightflight to Venus ‡	Boney M.	1	9 September 1978	4
30 September 1978	37	Parallel Lines	Blondie	1	17 February 1979	4
11 November 1978	8	Emotions ‡	Various artists	2	18 November 1978	1
11 November 1978	8	A Single Man	Elton John	8	20 January 1979	1
25 November 1978	8	20 Golden Greats ‡	Neil Diamond	2	9 December 1978	1
2 December 1978	7	Midnight Hustle	Various artists	2	13 January 1979	1
9 December 1978	12	Blondes Have More Fun ‡	Rod Stewart	3	9 December 1978	4
9 December 1978	8	The Singles: 1974–1978 ‡	The Carpenters	2	16 December 1978	3
23 December 1978	6	Greatest Hits (1976-1978)	Showaddywaddy	1	6 January 1979	2
23 December 1978	3	20 Songs of Joy ‡	Harry Secombe	8	23 December 1978	3
Albums in 1979
13 January 1979	7	Don't Walk – Boogie	Various artists	1	20 January 1979	3
20 January 1979	13	Armed Forces	Elvis Costello and The Attractions	2	20 January 1979	3
20 January 1979	4	Wings Greatest	Wings	5	3 February 1979	1
27 January 1979	6	The Best of Earth, Wind & Fire, Vol. 1	Earth, Wind & Fire	6	10 February 1979	1
27 January 1979	7	Action Replay	Various artists	1	10 February 1979	1
10 February 1979	3	Strangers in the Night	UFO	7	10 February 1979	1
17 February 1979	15	Spirits Having Flown	Bee Gees	1	17 March 1979	2
17 February 1979	4	Marty Robbins Golden Collection	Marty Robbins	5	24 February 1979	1
3 March 1979	3	Thank You Very Much (Reunion Concert at the London Palladium)	Cliff Richard and The Shadows	5	3 March 1979	2
3 March 1979	9	C'est Chic	Chic	2	7 April 1979	1
10 March 1979	32	Manilow Magic: The Best of Barry Manilow	Barry Manilow	3	10 March 1979	3
10 March 1979	2	Live (X Cert)	The Stranglers	7	10 March 1979	1
17 March 1979	3	The Great Rock 'n' Roll Swindle	Sex Pistols	7	17 March 1979	2
17 March 1979	1	52nd Street	Billy Joel	10	17 March 1979	1
24 March 1979	9	Barbra Streisand's Greatest Hits Volume 2	Barbra Streisand	1	31 March 1979	4
24 March 1979	7	A Collection of Their 20 Greatest Hits	The Three Degrees	8	24 March 1979	2
24 March 1979	5	Manifesto	Roxy Music	7	16 June 1979	1
24 March 1979	1	Desolation Angels	Bad Company	10	24 March 1979	1
31 March 1979	20	Breakfast in America	Supertramp	3	12 May 1979	6
31 March 1979	8	Dire Straits	Dire Straits	5	21 April 1979	1
7 April 1979	10	The Very Best of Leo Sayer	Leo Sayer	1	28 April 1979	3
21 April 1979	5	Country Life	Various artists	2	5 May 1979	1
28 April 1979	12	Last the Whole Night Long – 50 Non Stop Party Greats from James Last	James Last	2	30 June 1979	1
5 May 1979	4	Black Rose: A Rock Legend	Thin Lizzy	2	12 May 1979	1
12 May 1979	4	Fate for Breakfast	Art Garfunkel	2	26 May 1979	1
19 May 1979	18	Voulez-Vous	ABBA	1	19 May 1979	4
26 May 1979	4	Bob Dylan at Budokan	Bob Dylan	4	2 June 1979	1
26 May 1979	3	The Billie Jo Spears Singles Album	Billie Jo Spears	7	2 June 1979	2
2 June 1979	5	Do It Yourself	Ian Dury and the Blockheads	2	2 June 1979	2
9 June 1979	5	Lodger	David Bowie	4	16 June 1979	1
9 June 1979	3	This Is It	Various artists	6	16 June 1979	1
16 June 1979	21	Discovery	Electric Light Orchestra	1	16 June 1979	5
16 June 1979	2	Sky	Sky	9	16 June 1979	1
23 June 1979	3	Communiqué	Dire Straits	5	30 June 1979	1
30 June 1979	4	Back to the Egg	Wings	6	30 June 1979	1
30 June 1979	14	I Am	Earth, Wind & Fire	5	7 July 1979	5
30 June 1979	9	Replicas	Tubeway Army	1	21 July 1979	1
7 July 1979	4	Bridges	John Williams	5	7 July 1979	1
7 July 1979	3	Night Owl	Gerry Rafferty	9	28 July 1979	1
14 July 1979	5	Live Killers	Queen	3	14 July 1979	1
21 July 1979	11	The Best Disco Album in the World	Various artists	1	28 July 1979	6
4 August 1979	2	The Best of the Dooleys	The Dooleys	6	18 August 1979	1
11 August 1979	3	Some Product: Carri on Sex Pistols	Sex Pistols	6	11 August 1979	2
11 August 1979	12	Outlandos d'Amour	The Police	6	9 October 1979	1
18 August 1979	2	Highway to Hell	AC/DC	8	18 August 1979	1
25 August 1979	3	Down to Earth	Rainbow	6	1 September 1979	1
8 September 1979	5	In Through the Out Door	Led Zeppelin	1	8 September 1979	2
8 September 1979	5	Slow Train Coming	Bob Dylan	2	8 September 1979	1
15 September 1979	1	Street Life	The Crusaders	10	15 September 1979	1
22 September 1979	7	The Pleasure Principle	Gary Numan	1	22 September 1979	2
22 September 1979	4	Rock 'n' Roll Juvenile	Cliff Richard	3	22 September 1979	3
22 September 1979	13	String of Hits ♦	The Shadows	1	1 March 1980	3
29 September 1979	5	Oceans of Fantasy	Boney M.	1	29 September 1979	1
29 September 1979	1	The Adventures of the Hersham Boys	Sham 69	8	29 September 1979	1
6 October 1979	3	The Raven	The Stranglers	4	9 October 1979	1
9 October 1979	6	Eat to the Beat	Blondie	1	9 October 1979	1
9 October 1979	5	The Long Run	Eagles	4	13 October 1979	2
9 October 1979	1	Unleashed in the East	Judas Priest	10	9 October 1979	1
13 October 1979	26	Reggatta de Blanc	The Police	1	13 October 1979	4
13 October 1979	20	Off the Wall	Michael Jackson	5	20 October 1979	1
20 October 1979	3	Whatever You Want	Status Quo	3	20 October 1979	1
27 October 1979	6	Tusk	Fleetwood Mac	1	10 November 1979	1
27 October 1979	6	Lena's Music Album	Lena Martell	4	10 November 1979	1
3 November 1979	6	The Specials	The Specials	4	3 November 1979	1
3 November 1979	2	The Fine Art of Surfacing	The Boomtown Rats	7	3 November 1979	1
3 November 1979	5	Greatest Hits 1972–1978	10cc	5	10 November 1979	1
10 November 1979	5	Rock 'N' Roller Disco	Various artists	3	10 November 1979	1
10 November 1979	12	Greatest Hits, Vol. 1	Rod Stewart	1	8 December 1979	5
10 November 1979	13	Greatest Hits Vol. 2	ABBA	1	17 November 1979	4
10 November 1979	2	Stevie Wonder's Journey Through "The Secret Life of Plants"	Stevie Wonder	8	17 November 1979	1
17 November 1979	8	20 Golden Greats	Diana Ross	2	24 November 1979	1
24 November 1979	2	Setting Sons	The Jam	4	24 November 1979	1
24 November 1979	2	20 Golden Greats	Mantovani	9	24 November 1979	1
1 December 1979	6	Love Songs ♦	Elvis Presley	4	5 January 1980	1
8 December 1979	9	The Wall	Pink Floyd	3	8 December 1979	4
8 December 1979	6	ELO's Greatest Hits	Electric Light Orchestra	7	8 December 1979	1
8 December 1979	2	Crepes & Drapes	Showaddywaddy	8	8 December 1979	2
15 December 1979	4	Peace in the Valley	Various artists	6	22 December 1979	3
15 December 1979	1	Night Moves	Various artists	10	15 December 1979	1
22 December 1979	6	20 Hottest Hits ♦	Hot Chocolate	3	5 January 1980	1
22 December 1979	3	London Calling	The Clash	9	22 December 1979	3

== See also ==
- 1979 in British music
- List of number-one albums from the 1970s (UK)
