= Memories Don't Leave Like People Do =

Memories Don’t Leave Like People Do

Studio album by Tom Jones
- Released: 1975
- Label: Decca
- Producer: Johnny Bristol

Tom Jones chronology
20 Greatest Hits (1974)	Memories Don’t Leave Like People Do (1975)	Say You'll Stay Until Tomorrow (1976)

Professional ratings
Review scores
Source	Rating
AllMusic	4/5 stars

Memories Don’t Leave Like People Do is a studio album by Welsh singer Tom Jones, released in 1975 on Decca Records (on Parrot Records in the United States and Canada).

The album didn't enter the UK chart.

== Track listing ==
No.	Title	Writer(s)	Length
1.	"Memories Don’t Leave Like People Do"	Johnny Bristol, Jerry Butler, James Dean, John Glover
2.	"I Got Your Number"	Bristol, Gregory Reeves
3.	"The Pain Of Love"	Bristol
4.	"Mr Helping Hand"	Randolph William Ray, Daniel Den Warner
5.	"City Life"	Dennis Provisor
6.	"Lusty Lady"	Bristol
7.	"We Got Love"	Bristol
8.	"Son Of A Fisherman"	Provisor
9.	"You Inspire Me"	Terry Furlong
10.	"Us"	Burt Bacharach, Gwen Russell
