= 20 Fantastic Hits =

Compilation album
- Released: 1972
- Genre: Rock, funk, soul
- Label: Arcade

20 Fantastic Hits is a compilation album that reached number 1 in the UK. It is a notable album in that it was the first ever - and ultimately most successful - LP by compilation label Arcade Records.

== Track listing ==
1. Rod Stewart - Maggie May
2. The Osmonds - One Bad Apple
3. The Mixtures - The Pushbike Song
4. Melanie - Brand New Key
5. Vanity Fare - Early in the Morning
6. Slade - Coz I Luv You
7. The Piglets - Johnny Reggae
8. Johnny Johnson and the Bandwagon - Blame it On the Pony Express
9. The Bee Gees - My World
10. Dawn - Candida
11. The New Seekers - Beg, Steal or Borrow
12. The Delfonics - La La Means I Love You
13. The Hollies - The Baby
14. Donny Osmond - Puppy Love
15. Edison Lighthouse - Love Grows (Where My Rosemary Goes)
16. Lou Christie - I'm Gonna Make You Mine
17. Barry Ryan - Can't Let You Go
18. Daniel Boone - Beautiful Sunday
19. Melanie - What Have They Done To My Song Ma?
20. Chelsea Football Club - Blue Is The Colour

A second and third volume were subsequently released.
