= Somethin' 'Bout You Baby I Like (Tom Jones album) =

Studio album by Tom Jones
- Released: 1974
- Label: Decca
- Producer: Gordon Mills

Tom Jones chronology
Greatest Hits (1974)	Somethin' 'Bout You Baby I Like (1974)	20 Greatest Hits: The Tenth Anniversary Album of Tom Jones (1975)

Professional ratings
Review scores
Source	Rating
AllMusic	2.5/5 stars

Somethin' 'Bout You Baby I Like is a studio album by Welsh singer Tom Jones, released in 1974 on Decca Records (on Parrot Records in the United States and Canada).

The album didn't enter the UK chart.

== Track listing ==
Side 1
No.	Title	Writer(s)	Length
1.	"Somethin' 'Bout You Baby I Like"	R. Supa	3:25
2.	"You Make Me Smile"	E. Bruce, R. Lane	3:05
3.	"Till I Get It Right"	R. Lane, L. Henley	2:37
4.	"Rainin' in My Heart"	J. West, J. Moore	3:30
5.	"It Never Hurts to Be Nice to Somebody"	M. McGinnis	4:30

Side 2
No.	Title	Writer(s)	Length
1.	"Run Clero Run"	J. R. Bailey; K. Williams; M. Kent	4:10
2.	"Make Believe World"	T. McCauley	3:30
3.	"Which Way Home"	C. Wilde	3:13
4.	"Sing for the Good Times"	R. Frazier	3:35
5.	"Right Place, Wrong Time"	M. Rebenack	5:41

== Charts ==
Chart (1974)	Peak position
Australian Albums (Kent Music Report)	98
