= Pure Gold (various artists compilation album) =

Compilation album by Various artists
- Released: 1973
- Label: EMI

Pure Gold is a compilation album that reached number 1 in the UK albums chart. It was released by EMI and is alternatively known as Pure Gold on EMI. It was the label's first excursion into the world of TV-advertised compilations which had exploded with the recent arrival of K-Tel, Ronco and Arcade in the UK, although they would not explore this area consistently until the EMTV series launched in 1976.

== Track listing ==
1. T. Rex – "Solid Gold Easy Action"
2. Jackson 5 – "Lookin' Through the Windows"
3. Mud – "Crazy"
4. Bruce Ruffin – "Mad About You"
5. Diana Ross – "Doobedood'ndoobe, Doobedood'ndoobe, Doobedood'ndoo"
6. Wizzard – "Ball Park Incident"
7. Blue Mink – "Stay With Me"
8. Cliff Richard – "Living in Harmony"
9. Stevie Wonder – "Heaven Help Us All"
10. Geordie – "All Because of You"
11. Cliff Richard – "Power to All Our Friends"
12. The Temptations – "Psychedelic Shack"
13. Hurricane Smith – "Who Was It?"
14. T. Rex – "20th Century Boy"
15. Cilla Black – "Step Inside Love"
16. Electric Light Orchestra – "Roll Over Beethoven"
17. Four Tops – "Keeper of the Castle"
18. New World – "Sister Jane"
19. Deep Purple – "Strange Kind of Woman"
20. Kenny – "Heart of Stone"
