= Bridges (John Williams album) =

Studio album by John Williams
- Released: 1979
- Recorded: Studio 3, Abbey Road Studios
- Genre: Classical, soft rock, symphonic rock, instrumental rock
- Label: Lotus Records, Cube/Electric Records
- Producer: Cube/Electric Records

Professional ratings
Review scores
| Source | Rating |
|---|---|
| Allmusic | 2/5 stars |

Bridges is a studio album by Australian classical guitarist John Williams released in 1979. The album contains many original arrangements by Stanley Myers including Cavatina (The Theme From 'The Deer Hunter') and includes covers of Bach compositions. The album topped out at fifth on the UK Albums Chart in 1979, and was in the top ten for four weeks.

== Reception ==
The AllMusic review awards the album 2 stars.

== Track listing ==
=== Side one ===
1. "Cavatina (Theme from 'The Deer Hunter'" (Stanley Myers) - 03:32
2. "Because" (John Lennon/Paul McCartney) - 03:18
3. "Air on a 'G' String" (J.S.Bach, Arr. Stanley Myers) - 03:51
4. "J.S.B." (J.S.Bach, Arr. Stanley Myers) - 02:15
5. "Portrait" (Stanley Myers) - 02:33
6. "Bach Changes" (J.S.Bach, Adapted & Arr. Stanley Myers)- 04:17

=== Side two ===
1. "Romanza" (Trad Arr. Stanley Myers) - 02:45
2. "Woodstock" (Joni Mitchell) - 05:17
3. "The Swagman" (Stanley Myers) - 04:00
4. "Sheep May Safely Graze" (J.S.Bach, Arr. Stanley Myers) - 03:55
5. "From the Top" (J.S.Bach, Arr. Stanley Myers) - 03:47
6. "New Rising Sun" (Trad Adptd Arr. Stanley Myers) - 05:21

== Personnel ==
- John Williams - guitar

=== Additional ===
- The London Symphony Orchestra
- Chris Whitemore Associates - Sleeve Design
