= Say You'll Stay Until Tomorrow (album) =

Studio album by Tom Jones
- Released: 1977
- Label: Epic
- Producer: Gordon Mills

Tom Jones chronology
Memories Don't Leave Like People Do (1975)	Say You'll Stay Until Tomorrow (1977)	What a Night (1977)

Say You'll Stay Until Tomorrow is a studio album by Welsh singer Tom Jones, released in 1977 by Epic Records in the United States and by EMI in the UK.

== Track listing ==
Side 1
No.	Title	Length
1.	"Say You'll Stay Until Tomorrow"
2.	"One Man Woman"
3.	"Anniversary Song"
4.	"When It's Just You and Me"
5.	"Papa"

Side 2
No.	Title	Length
1.	"Take Me Tonight"
2.	"At Every End There's a Beginning"
3.	"Come to Me" (Theme from "The Pink Panther Strikes Again")
4.	"We Had It All"
5.	"Have You Ever Been Lonely"

== Charts ==
Chart (1977)	Peak position
US Billboard 200	76
US Top Country Albums (Billboard)	3
