= Words of Love (Buddy Holly & The Crickets album) =

Greatest hits album by Buddy Holly and the Crickets
- Released: 1993
- Recorded: 1957–1958
- Genre: Rock and roll; rockabilly; pop
- Length: 62:23
- Label: PolyGram
- Producer: Norman Petty

Buddy Holly and the Crickets chronology
True Love Ways (1989)	Words of Love (1993)	The Buddy Holly Collection (1993)

The Crickets chronology
Double Exposure (1993)	Words of Love (1993)	Too Much Monday Morning (1996)

Words of Love is a compilation album by Buddy Holly and the Crickets. It was released by PolyGram in 1993 and reached number one on the UK Albums Chart, becoming a posthumous number one. The album was certified gold in the UK.

== Track listing ==
1. "Words of Love" - 1:58
2. "That'll Be the Day" - 2:19
3. "Peggy Sue" - 2:33
4. "Think It Over" - 1:49
5. "True Love Ways" - 2:52
6. "What to Do" - 1:54
7. "Crying, Waiting, Hoping" - 2:15
8. "Well... All Right" - 2:16
9. "Love's Made a Fool of You" - 2:01
10. "Peggy Sue Got Married" - 2:08
11. "Valley of Tears" - 2:12
12. "Wishing" - 2:04
13. "Raining in My Heart" - 2:51
14. "Oh, Boy!" - 2:11
15. "Rave On" - 1:52
16. "Brown Eyed Handsome Man" - 2:06
17. "Bo Diddley" - 2:22
18. "It's So Easy" - 2:13
19. "It Doesn't Matter Anymore" - 2:06
20. "Maybe Baby" - 2:05
21. "Early in the Morning" - 2:10
22. "Love Is Strange" - 3:07
23. "Listen to Me" - 2:23
24. "I'm Gonna Love You Too" - 2:16
25. "Learning the Game" - 2:14
26. "Baby I Don't Care" - 1:39
27. "Heartbeat" - 2:11
28. "Everyday" - 2:07

== Chart performance ==
Weekly chart performance for Words of Love
Chart (1993)	Peak position
UK Albums Chart	1

=== Year-end charts ===
Year-end chart performance for Words of Love
Chart (1993)	Position
UK Albums (OCC)	84
