= Melody Maker =

British music magazine, 1926–2000

- Frequency: Weekly
- First issue: January 1926
- Final issue: December 2000
- Company: IPC Media
- Country: United Kingdom
- Based in: London, England
- Language: English
- ISSN: 0025-9012

Melody Maker was a British weekly music magazine, one of the world's earliest music weeklies; according to its publisher, IPC Media, the earliest. In January 2001, it was merged into "long-standing rival" (and IPC Media sister publication) New Musical Express (NME).

== 1920s–1940s ==
Melody Maker was founded in 1926 by Leicester-born composer and publisher Lawrence Wright as the house magazine for his music publishing business, often promoting his own songs. Two months later it had become a full scale magazine, more generally aimed at dance band musicians, under the title The Melody Maker and British Metronome. It was published monthly from the basement of 19 Denmark Street in London (soon relocating to 93 Long Acre), and the first editor was the drummer and dance-band leader Edgar Jackson (1895–1967).

Jackson instigated a jazz column, which gained in credibility once it was taken over by Spike Hughes in 1930. This was later developed into "Jazz Corner", edited by Sinclair Traill and then Max Jones, one of the leading British proselytizers for jazz. There were regular reports on jazz happenings in the United States, and the magazine secured the first British interview with Louis Armstrong in July 1932 while he was over for a visit.

Odhams Press took over the magazine in 1928, and the format was changed to a 16-page weekly newspaper in 1933. Ray Sonin joined the staff in 1939, progressing to news editor and then 10 years as managing editor until 1951. Sonin subsequently joined the New Musical Express.

== 1950s–1960s ==
Melody Maker (7 September 1968 issue)

The Melody Maker (MM) was slow to cover rock and roll and lost ground to the New Musical Express (NME), which had begun in 1952. MM launched its own weekly singles chart (a top 20) on 7 April 1956, and an LPs charts in November 1958, two years after the Record Mirror had published the first UK Albums Chart. From 1964, the paper led its rival publications in terms of approaching music and musicians as a subject for serious study rather than merely entertainment. Staff reporters such as Chris Welch and Ray Coleman applied a perspective previously reserved for jazz artists to the rise of American-influenced local rock and pop groups, extending the reach of music criticism.

On 6 March 1965, MM called for the Beatles to be honoured by the British state. This duly happened on 12 June that year, when all four members of the group (Harrison, Lennon, McCartney, and Starr) were appointed as members of the Order of the British Empire. By the late 1960s, MM had recovered, targeting an older market than the teen-oriented NME. MM had larger and more specialised advertising; soon-to-be well-known groups would advertise for musicians. It ran pages devoted to "minority" interests like folk and jazz, as well as detailed reviews of musical instruments.

A 1968 Melody Maker poll named John Peel best radio DJ, attention which John Walters said may have helped Peel keep his job despite concerns at BBC Radio 1 about his style and record selection.

Starting from the mid-1960s, critics such as Welch, Richard Williams, Michael Watts and Steve Lake were among the first British journalists to shed an intellectual light on such popular music artists as Steely Dan, Cat Stevens, Led Zeppelin, Pink Floyd and Henry Cow.

== 1970s ==
By the early 1970s, Melody Maker was considered "the musos' journal" and associated with progressive rock. However, Melody Maker also reported on teenybopper pop stars such as the Osmonds, the Jackson 5, and David Cassidy. The music weekly also gave early and sympathetic coverage to glam rock. Richard Williams wrote the first pieces about Roxy Music, while Roy Hollingworth wrote the first article celebrating New York Dolls in proto-punk terms while serving as the Melody Maker's New York correspondent.

Andrew Means started writing for Melody Maker in 1970. During his time, he was prolific and had the responsibility of covering folk music. He was with the paper until 1973. He later wrote for The Arizona Republic. He was also a freelancer and wrote for Sing Out!, Billboard, Jazziz, Rhythm and Songlines etc. In later years he was a fiction writer.

In January 1972, Michael "Mick" Watts, a prominent writer for the paper, wrote a profile of David Bowie that almost singlehandedly ignited the singer's dormant career. During the interview Bowie said, "I'm gay, and always have been, even when I was David Jones." "OH YOU PRETTY THING" ran the headline, and swiftly became part of pop mythology. Bowie later attributed his success to this interview, stating that, "Yeah, it was Melody Maker that made me. It was that piece by Mick Watts." During his tenure at the paper, Watts also toured with and interviewed artists including Syd Barrett, Waylon Jennings, Pink Floyd, Bob Dylan, and Bruce Springsteen.

Caroline Coon was headhunted by Melody Maker editor Ray Coleman in the mid-1970s and promptly made it her mission to get women musicians taken seriously. Between 1974 and 1976, she interviewed Maggie Bell, Joan Armatrading, Lynsey de Paul, and Twiggy. She then went on to make it her mission to promote punk rock.

In 1978, Richard Williams returned – after a stint working at Island Records – to the paper as the new editor and attempted to take Melody Maker in a new direction, influenced by what Paul Morley and Ian Penman were doing at NME. He recruited Jon Savage (formerly of Sounds), Chris Bohn and Mary Harron to provide intellectual coverage of post-punk bands like Gang of Four, Pere Ubu, and Joy Division and of new wave in general. Vivien Goldman, previously at NME and Sounds, gave the paper improved coverage of reggae and soul music, restoring the superior coverage of those genres that the paper had in the early 1970s.

Internal tension developed, principally between Williams and Coleman, by this time editor-in-chief, who wanted the paper to stick to the more "conservative rock" music it had continued to support during the punk era. Coleman had been insistent that the paper should "look like The Daily Telegraph" (renowned for its old-fashioned design), but Williams wanted the paper to look more contemporary. He commissioned an updated design, but this was rejected by Coleman.

== 1980s ==
Melody Maker redesigned as MM

In 1980, after a strike which had taken the paper (along with NME) out of publication for a period, Williams left MM. Coleman promoted Michael Oldfield from the design staff to day-to-day editor, and, for a while, took it back where it had been, with news of a line-up change in Jethro Tull replacing features about Andy Warhol, Gang of Four and Factory Records on the cover. Several journalists, such as Chris Bohn and Vivien Goldman, moved to NME, while Jon Savage joined the new magazine The Face. Coleman left in 1981, the paper's design was updated, but sales and prestige were at a low ebb through the early 1980s, with NME dominant.

By 1983, the magazine had become more populist and pop-orientated, exemplified by its modish "MM" masthead, regular covers for the likes of Duran Duran and its choice of Eurythmics' Touch as the best album of the year. Things were to change, however. In February 1984, Allan Jones, a staff writer on the paper since 1974, was appointed editor: defying instructions to put Kajagoogoo on the cover, he led the magazine with an article on up-and-coming band The Smiths.

In 1986, MM was invigorated by the arrival of a group of journalists, including Simon Reynolds and David Stubbs, who had run a music fanzine called Monitor from the University of Oxford, and Chris Roberts, from Sounds magazine, who established MM as more individualistic and intellectual. This was especially true after the hip-hop wars at NME, a schism between enthusiasts of progressive black music such as Public Enemy and Mantronix and fans of traditional white rock ended in a victory for the latter and the departure of writers such as Mark Sinker and Biba Kopf (as Chris Bohn was now calling himself), and the rise of Andrew Collins and Stuart Maconie, who pushed NME in a more populist direction.

== 1990s ==
Melody Maker (21 August 1993)

While MM continued to devote most space to rock and indie music (notably Everett True's coverage of the emerging grunge scene in Seattle), it covered house, hip-hop, post-rock, rave and trip hop. Two of the paper's writers, Push and Ben Turner, went on to launch IPC Media's monthly dance music magazine Muzik. Even in the mid-1990s, when Britpop brought a new generation of readers to the music press, it remained less populist than its rivals, with younger writers such as Simon Price and Taylor Parkes continuing the 1980s tradition of iconoclasm and opinionated criticism. The paper printed harsh criticism of Ocean Colour Scene and Kula Shaker, and allowed dissenting views on Oasis and Blur at a time when they were praised by the rest of the press.

In 1993, they gave a French rock band called Darlin' a negative review calling their music "a daft punky thrash". Darlin' eventually became the electronic music duo Daft Punk.

Australian journalist Andrew Mueller joined MM in 1990 and became Reviews Editor between 1991 and 1993, eventually declining to become Features Editor and leaving the magazine in 1993. He then went on to join NME under his former boss Steve Sutherland, who had left MM in 1992.

The magazine retained its large classified ads section, and remained the first call for musicians wanting to form a band. Suede formed through ads placed in the paper. MM also continued to publish reviews of musical equipment and readers' demo tapes, though these often had little in common stylistically with the rest of the paper, ensuring sales to jobbing musicians who would otherwise have little interest in the music press.

In early 1997, Allan Jones left to edit Uncut. He was replaced by Mark Sutherland, formerly of NME and Smash Hits, who thus "fulfilled [his] boyhood dream" and stayed on to edit the magazine for three years. Many long-standing writers left, often moving to Uncut, with Simon Price departing allegedly because he objected to an edict that coverage of Oasis should be positive. Its sales, which had already been substantially lower than those of the NME, entered a serious decline.

In 1999, MM relaunched as a glossy magazine, but the magazine closed the following year, merging into IPC Media's other music magazine, NME, which took on some of its journalists and music reviewers.

== Editors ==
1926: Edgar Jackson
1930: P. Mathison Brooks
1940: Ray Sonin
1949: Pat Brand
1962: Jack Hutton
1970: Ray Coleman
1978: Richard Williams
1980: Michael Oldfield
1984: Allan Jones
1997: Mark Sutherland

== See also ==
- Sounds (founded 1970 by ex-MM employees)
- List of Melody Maker UK number one albums
