= Elvis the King =

Box set by Elvis Presley
- Released: August 13, 2007
- Genre: Rock
- Label: RCA–Legacy

Elvis the King is a box set comprising 18 singles of the recorded work of American singer and musician Elvis Presley, released in 2007 by RCA Records. The box set is available in both CD and 10" vinyl formats.

The first release was Monday, August 13, 2007, marking 30 years—to the week—since the death of Elvis Presley. The second single was released on Thursday, August 16, which is the exact anniversary of Presley's death. From then on, the singles were released every Monday until December 2, 2007.

== Releases and chart positions ==
Note: original chart positions are in brackets

| Date | Title | Track listing | UK |
|---|---|---|---|
| August 13, 2007 | "Heartbreak Hotel" (plus limited edition collector's box) | 1. "Heartbreak Hotel"; 2. "I Was the One"; 3. "Heartbreak Hotel" (alt. take 6) | (#2) n/a |
| August 16, 2007 | "Suspicious Minds" | 1. "Suspicious Minds"; 2. "You'll Think of Me"; 3. "Suspicious Minds" (alt. take 7) | (#2) #11 |
| August 20, 2007 | "Blue Suede Shoes" | 1. "Blue Suede Shoes"; 2. "Tutti Frutti"; 3. "Lawdy, Miss Clawdy" (alt. take 1) | (#9) #13 |
| August 27, 2007 | "Hound Dog" | 1. "Hound Dog"; 2. "Don't Be Cruel"; 3. "Any Way You Want Me" (master) | (#2) #14 |
| September 3, 2007 | "(Let Me Be Your) Teddy Bear" | 1. "(Let Me Be Your) Teddy Bear"; 2. "Loving You"; 3. "Loving You" (farm version, alt. take 6) | (#3) #14 |
| September 10, 2007 | "Party" | 1. "Party"; 2. "Got a Lot o' Livin' to Do!"; 3. "Got a Lot o' Livin' to Do!" (movie master, take 17) | (#2) #14 |
| September 17, 2007 | "Don't" | 1. "Don't"; 2. "I Beg of You"; 3. "I Beg of You" (alt. take 5) | (#2) #14 |
| September 24, 2007 | "Hard Headed Woman" | 1. "Hard Headed Woman"; 2. "Don't Ask Me Why"; 3. "Steadfast, Loyal and True" (undubbed master) | (#2) #15 |
| October 1, 2007 | "King Creole" | 1. "King Creole"; 2. "Dixieland Rock"; 3. "King Creole" (alt. take 18) | (#2) #15 |
| October 8, 2007 | "A Big Hunk o' Love" | 1. "A Big Hunk o' Love"; 2. "My Wish Came True"; 3. "A Big Hunk o' Love" (alt. take 1) | (#4) #12 |
| October 15, 2007 | "Wear My Ring Around Your Neck" | 1. "Wear My Ring Around Your Neck"; 2. "Doncha Think It's Time"; 3. "Doncha Think It's Time" (alt. take 48) | (#3) #16 |
| October 22, 2007 | "If I Can Dream" | 1. "If I Can Dream"; 2. "Memories"; 3. "If I Can Dream" (alt. take 1) | (#11) #17 |
| October 29, 2007 | "Viva Las Vegas" | 1. "Viva Las Vegas"; 2. "What'd I Say"; 3. "Viva Las Vegas" (alt. takes 1 & 2) | (#17) #15 |
| November 5, 2007 | "In the Ghetto" | 1. "In the Ghetto; 2. "Any Day Now"; 3. "In the Ghetto" (alt. take 3) | (#2) #13 |
| November 12, 2007 | "You Don't Have to Say You Love Me" | 1. "You Don't Have to Say You Love Me"; 2. "Patch It Up"; 3. "Patch It Up" (alt. take 9) | (#9) #16 |
| November 19, 2007 | "Always on My Mind" | 1. "Always on My Mind"; 2. "Separate Ways"; 3. "Always on My Mind" (alt. take 2) | (#9) #17 |
| November 26, 2007 | "An American Trilogy" | 1. "An American Trilogy"; 2. "The First Time I Ever Saw Your Face"; 3. "An American Trilogy" (Aloha version) | (#8) #12 |
| December 2, 2007 | "Burning Love" | 1. "Burning Love"; 2. "It's a Matter of Time"; 3. "Burning Love" (alt. take) | (#7) #13 |

August 20 also saw the release of the HMV-exclusive single My Baby Left Me, which is also available on CD and 10" vinyl format. This reached #19 in the UK.

== Compilation CD ==
As well as the box set, a 2-disc compilation album of Presley's work was also released. The album reached No. 1 in the UK and Germany, Presley's first No. 1 album in the latter. As of January 27, 2018, the album was certified with a Double Platinum ARIA award in Australia, totalling sales in excess of 140,000.

=== Track listing ===
Disc 1:

1. "Suspicious Minds"
2. "Blue Suede Shoes"
3. "Jailhouse Rock"
4. "Love Me Tender"
5. "Don't Be Cruel"
6. "King Creole"
7. "Hard Headed Woman"
8. "All Shook Up"
9. "Hound Dog"
10. "Too Much"
11. "Heartbreak Hotel"
12. "(Let Me Be Your) Teddy Bear"
13. "Good Rockin' Tonight"
14. "That's All Right"
15. "One Night"
16. "(Now and Then There's) A Fool Such as I"
17. "A Big Hunk o' Love"
18. "Wear My Ring Around Your Neck"
19. "Crying in the Chapel"
20. "Stuck on You"
21. "Kentucky Rain"
22. "Viva Las Vegas"
23. "Devil in Disguise"
24. "Guitar Man"
25. "A Little Less Conversation"
26. "Welcome to My World"

Disc 2:

1. "Mystery Train"
2. "Love Me"
3. "In the Ghetto"
4. "Burning Love"
5. "Always on My Mind"
6. "The Wonder of You"
7. "I Just Can’t Help Believin’"
8. "I Want To Be Free"
9. "You Don’t Have to Say You Love Me"
10. "An American Trilogy"
11. "Are You Lonesome Tonight?"
12. "Can't Help Falling in Love"
13. "Rock-A-Hula Baby"
14. "Return to Sender"
15. "Don’t"
16. "(Marie's the Name) His Latest Flame"
17. "Good Luck Charm"
18. "Surrender"
19. "She's Not You"
20. "A Mess of Blues"
21. "It's Now or Never"
22. "Fever"
23. "Moody Blue"
24. "Way Down"
25. "My Way"
26. "If I Can Dream"

== Charts ==
=== Weekly charts ===
| Chart (2007) | Peak position |
|---|---|
| Australian Albums (ARIA) | 4 |
| Austrian Albums (Ö3 Austria) | 1 |
| German Albums (Offizielle Top 100) | 1 |
| Italian Albums (FIMI) | 63 |
| New Zealand Albums (RMNZ) | 2 |
| Spanish Albums (Promusicae) | 11 |
| Swiss Albums (Schweizer Hitparade) | 3 |
| UK Albums (Official Charts) | 1 |

=== Year-end charts ===
| Chart (2007) | Position |
|---|---|
| Austrian Albums (Ö3 Austria) | 14 |
| German Albums (Offizielle Top 100) | 82 |
| New Zealand Albums (RMNZ) | 38 |
| Swiss Albums (Schweizer Hitparade) | 100 |
| UK Albums (OCC) | 96 |

== Certifications ==
| Region | Certification | Certified units/sales |
|---|---|---|
| Australia (ARIA) | 2× Platinum | 140,000^{‡} |
| Austria (IFPI Austria) | Platinum | 20,000^{*} |
| Austria (IFPI Austria) 75th Anniversary | Gold | 10,000^{*} |
| New Zealand (RMNZ) | Platinum | 15,000^{‡} |
| United Kingdom (BPI) | Gold | 100,000^{*} |
^{*} Sales figures based on certification alone.^{‡} Sales+streaming figures based on certification alone.
