= 40 Golden Greats =

40 Golden Greats may refer to:

- 40 Golden Greats (Cliff Richard album)
- 40 Golden Greats (Jim Reeves album)
