= The Best Disco Album in the World =

Compilation album by various artists
- Released: 29 June 1979
- Genre: Disco
- Label: WEA Records

The Best Disco Album in the World is a European compilation album released by WEA Records in 1979 comprising many recent disco-orientated hits. In the UK, the album was released in June and charted the following month, reaching No. 1 in the albums chart for six consecutive weeks. It was the longest-running No. 1 album of the year and was certified platinum by the BPI. In other parts of Europe, the track listing was altered.

== UK track listing ==
Side one

1. "Le Freak" – Chic (Edwards, Rodgers)
2. "Knock on Wood" – Amii Stewart (Floyd, Cropper)
3. "One Way Ticket" – Eruption (Hunter, Keller)
4. "Painter Man" – Boney M (Phillips, Pickett)
5. "I'm Every Woman" – Chaka Khan (Ashford, Simpson)
6. "One Nation Under a Groove" – Funkadelic (Shider, Clinton, Morrison)
7. "He's the Greatest Dancer" – Sister Sledge (Edwards, Rodgers)
8. "Love Don't Live Here Anymore" – Rose Royce (Gregory)

Side two

1. "We Are Family" – Sister Sledge (Edwards, Rodgers)
2. "I Want Your Love" – Chic (Edwards. Rodgers)
3. "I Can't Stand the Rain" – Eruption (Peebles, Miller, Bryant)
4. "Fire" – The Pointer Sisters (Springsteen)
5. "Wishing on a Star" – Rose Royce (Calvin)
6. "Young Hearts Run Free" – Candi Staton (Crawford)
7. "Weekend" – Mick Jackson (Jackson, Mayer)
8. "You Really Touched My Heart" – Amii Stewart (Leng, May)
9. "Hooray! Hooray! It's a Holi-Holiday" – Boney M (Farian, Jay)
