= Elvis' 40 Greatest =

Elvis' 40 Greatest Hits

Compilation album by Elvis Presley
- Released: October 1974
- Recorded: 1956–1970
- Genre: Pop, rock
- Length: 1:37:45
- Label: Arcade

Elvis' 40 Greatest is a compilation album by American singer and musician Elvis Presley. It was released in 1974 and was the UK's biggest-selling album over the Christmas period of that year, but along with all albums on K-tel, Ronco and Arcade, it was ineligible for the UK Albums Chart until 1975 because it was felt that heavy TV advertising and low pricing distorted the charts. It finally reached number one on the UK Albums Chart in 1977, and became the 10th best-selling album of the 1970s in the UK.

It was originally pressed with a brown cover and doctored image of Elvis, with blue labels, this short lived pressing was replaced by yellow label copies. The 1977 release, which appeared on the new RCA blue "signature" label, credited to "RCA Special Products", was released simultaneously on black vinyl and a more expensive pink vinyl edition. The black vinyl sold a stagger 250'000 copies LESS than the pink vinyl, making it the more collectable item, even though fans are often tricked in to thinking the pink vinyl is "rare". It is in fact one of the most common and best selling Elvis compilation albums of all time.

== Track listing ==
Disc one
No.	Title	Writer(s)	Recording date	Length
1.	"My Baby Left Me"	Arthur Crudup, Elvis Presley	January 30, 1956	2:11
2.	"Heartbreak Hotel"	Mae Axton, Tommy Durden, Elvis Presley	January 10, 1956	2:09
3.	"Blue Suede Shoes"	Carl Perkins	January 30, 1956	2:00
4.	"Hound Dog"	Jerry Leiber and Mike Stoller	July 2, 1956	2:15
5.	"Love Me Tender"	Vera Matson and Elvis Presley	August 24, 1956	2:41
6.	"Got a Lot of Livin' to Do"	Aaron Schroeder and Ben Weisman	January 12, 1957	2:31
7.	"(Let Me Be Your) Teddy Bear"	Jerry Leiber and Mike Stoller	February 24, 1957	2:12
8.	"Party"	Jessie Mae Robinson	January 22, 1957	1:27
9.	"All Shook Up"	Otis Blackwell and Elvis Presley	January 12, 1957	1:57
10.	"Old Shep"	Red Foley	September 2, 1956	4:10
11.	"Don't"	Jerry Leiber and Mike Stoller	September 6, 1957	2:48
12.	"Hard Headed Woman"	Claude Demetrius	January 15, 1958	1:53
13.	"King Creole"	Jerry Leiber and Mike Stoller	January 23, 1958	2:16
14.	"Jailhouse Rock"	Jerry Leiber and Mike Stoller	April 30, 1957	2:27
15.	"A Big Hunk o' Love"	Aaron Schroeder, Sid Wyche	June 10, 1958	2:12
16.	"I Got Stung"	Aaron Schroeder, David Hill	June 10, 1958	1:50
17.	"One Night"	Dave Bartholomew, Pearl King, Anita Steiman	February 23, 1957	2:29
18.	"(Now and Then There's) A Fool Such as I"	Bill Trader	June 10, 1958	2:36
19.	"I Need Your Love Tonight"	Bix Reichner, Sid Wayne	June 10, 1958	2:04
20.	"Stuck on You"	Aaron Schroeder, Leslie McFarland	March 20, 1960	2:16
Total length:				46:24

Disc two
No.	Title	Writer(s)	Recording date	Length
1.	"Fever"	John Davenport, Eddie Cooley	April 3, 1960	3:31
2.	"It's Now or Never"	Eduardo di Capua, Aaron Schroeder, Wally Gold	April 3, 1960	3:15
3.	"Are You Lonesome Tonight?"	Lou Handman, Roy Turk	April 3, 1960	3:05
4.	"Wooden Heart"	Ben Weisman, Fred Wise, Kathleen Twomey, Bert Kaempfert	April 28, 1960	2:03
5.	"Surrender"	Doc Pomus, Mort Shuman	October 30, 1960	1:52
6.	"(Marie's the Name) His Latest Flame"	Doc Pomus, Mort Shuman	June 25, 1961	2:08
7.	"Wild in the Country"	Luigi Creatore, Hugo Peretti, George David Weiss	November 7, 1960	1:58
8.	"There's Always Me"	Don Robertson	March 12, 1961	2:16
9.	"Rock-A-Hula Baby"	Fred Wise, Ben Weisman, Dolores Fuller	March 23, 1961	2:24
10.	"Can't Help Falling in Love"	Hugo Peretti, Luigi Creatore, George Weiss	March 23, 1961	3:01
11.	"Good Luck Charm"	Aaron Schroeder, Wally Gold	October 15, 1961	2:24
12.	"She's Not You"	Doc Pomus, Jerry Leiber and Mike Stoller	March 19, 1962	2:03
13.	"Return to Sender"	Otis Blackwell, Winfield Scott	March 27, 1962	2:05
14.	"(You're the) Devil in Disguise"	Bill Giant, Bernie Baum, Florence Kaye	May 26, 1963	2:01
15.	"Crying in the Chapel"	Artie Glenn	October 30, 1960	2:23
16.	"Guitar Man"	Jerry Reed	September 10, 1967	2:30
17.	"In the Ghetto"	Mac Davis	January 20, 1969	2:48
18.	"Suspicious Minds"	Mark James	January 22, 1969	4:22
19.	"There Goes My Everything"	Dallas Frazier	June 8, 1970	3:10
20.	"Don't Cry Daddy"	Mac Davis	January 15, 1969	3:09
Total length:				51:21

== Chart performance ==
=== Weekly charts ===
Chart (1975–79)	Peak position
UK Albums (OCC)	1

=== Year-end charts ===
Chart (1975)	Position
UK Albums (OCC)	6
Chart (1977)	Position
UK Albums (OCC)	50

== Certifications and sales ==
Region	Certification	Certified units/sales
United Kingdom (BPI)	Platinum	1,500,000
