= 20 Greatest Hits (Tom Jones album) =

Compilation album by Tom Jones
- Released: 28 February 1975
- Genre: Pop, MOR
- Length: 60:54
- Label: Decca Records

Tom Jones chronology
Somethin' 'Bout You Baby I Like (1974)	20 Greatest Hits (1975)	Memories Don't Leave Like People Do (1975)

20 Greatest Hits (subtitled The Tenth Anniversary Album) is a 1975 compilation album by Tom Jones. As the subtitle suggests, it had been ten years since Jones' first hit, "It's Not Unusual" in 1965. With a copyright date of 1974, the album was released in the UK on 28 February 1975. It reached No.1 on the charts in March for four consecutive weeks and was certified Gold, becoming his biggest album to that point.

Half of the album's 20 tracks were top 10 hits, including two number ones.

== Track listing ==
Side one

1. "It's Not Unusual" (1.58)
2. "Only Once" (4.07)
3. "I'll Never Fall in Love Again" (4.11)
4. "Somethin' 'Bout You Baby I Like" (3.29)
5. "What's New Pussycat" (2.03)

Side two

1. "Till" (2.16)
2. "Runnin' Bear" (3.37)
3. "Green Green Grass of Home" (3.02)
4. "Thunderball" (2.50)
5. "Love Me Tonight" (3.11)

Side three

1. "She's a Lady" (2.53)
2. "Pledging My Love" (2.50)
3. "Funny Familiar Forgotten Feelings" (2.55)
4. "With These Hands" (2.42)
5. "Delilah" (3.21)

Side four

1. "I'm Coming Home" (3.07)
2. "To Make a Big Man Cry" (2.45)
3. "Help Yourself" (2.53)
4. "The Sun Died" (3.29)
5. "Daughter of Darkness" (3.15)

== Charts ==
=== Weekly charts ===
Chart (1975)	Peak position
UK Albums (OCC)	1

=== Year-end charts ===
Chart (1975)	Position
UK Albums (OCC)	14

== Certifications and sales ==
Region	Certification	Certified units/sales
United Kingdom (BPI)	Gold	100,000^{^}
^{^} Shipments figures based on certification alone.
