= 20 Golden Greats (Nat King Cole album) =

Greatest hits album by Nat King Cole
- Released: 1978
- Recorded: 1957–1966
- Genre: Soul
- Label: Capitol

20 Golden Greats is a greatest hits album by Nat King Cole. It was released by Capitol Records in 1978 and reached number one on the UK Albums Chart, where it was a posthumous number one.

== Track listing ==
No.	Title	Writer(s)	Year Produced	Length
1.	"Sweet Lorraine"	Burwell-Parish	1957
2.	"Straighten Up And Fly Right"	Mills-Cole	1963
3.	"Nature Boy"	Eden ahbez	1963
4.	"Ballerina"	Sigman-Russell	1963
5.	"Mona Lisa"	Livingston-Evans	1957
6.	"Too Young"	Lippman-Dee	1957
7.	"Love Letters"	Young-Heyman	1957
8.	"Smile"	Chaplin-Turner-Parsons	1963
9.	"Around The World"	Young-Adamson	1966
10.	"For All We Know"	Coots-Lewis	1958
11.	"When I Fall In Love"	Heyman-Young	1957
12.	"The Very Thought Of You"	Nobel	1958
13.	"On the Street Where You Live"	Loewe-Lerner	1964
14.	"Unforgettable"	Gordon	1961
15.	"It's All in the Game"	Dawes-Sigman	1957
16.	"Ramblin' Rose"	J&N Sherman	1962
17.	"Portrait Of Jennie"	Robinson-Burdge	1957
18.	"Let There Be Love"	Grant-Rand	1962
19.	"Somewhere Along The Way"	Adams-Gallop	1963
20.	"Those Lazy-Hazy-Crazy Days of Summer"	Tobias-Carste	1957

== Charts ==
Chart (1978)	Peak position
UK Albums Chart	1

Chart (1991)	Peak position
Australian Albums (ARIA Charts)	27

== Certifications ==
Region	Certification	Certified units/sales
Australia (ARIA)	Platinum	70,000^{^}
Finland (Musiikkituottajat)	Gold	20,000
New Zealand (RMNZ)	Gold	7,500^{^}
United Kingdom (BPI)	Platinum	300,000^{^}
^{^} Shipments figures based on certification alone.
