= 40 Greatest Hits (Perry Como album) =

Greatest hits album by Perry Como
- Released: 1975
- Label: K-Tel

Perry Como chronology
Just Out of Reach (1975)	40 Greatest Hits (1975)	A Legendary Performer (1976)

40 Greatest Hits is a greatest hits album by Perry Como. It was released by K-Tel by arrangement with RCA Records in 1975 and peaked at number one on the UK Albums Chart. It was the Christmas number two album that year. The album was not issued in the United States & has never had an official CD release in the UK.

== Track listing ==
=== Side One ===
1. Magic Moments
2. Caterina
3. Catch a Falling Star
4. I Know
5. When You Were Sweet Sixteen
6. I Believe
7. Try To Remember
8. Love Makes The World Go Round
9. Prisoner Of Love
10. Don't Let the Stars Get in Your Eyes

=== Side Two ===
1. Hot Diggity
2. Round and Round
3. If I Loved You
4. Hello Young Lovers
5. Delaware
6. Moonglow
7. Killing Me Softly
8. More
9. Dear Hearts and Gentle People
10. I Love You & Don't You Forget It

=== Side Three ===
1. And I Love You So
2. For The Good Times
3. Close To You
4. Seattle
5. Tie A Yellow Ribbon
6. Walk Right Back
7. What Kind of Fool Am I?
8. Days of Wine and Roses
9. Where Do I Begin
10. Without A Song

=== Side Four ===
1. It's Impossible
2. I Think of You
3. If
4. We've Only Just Begun
5. I Want To Give
6. Raindrops Keep Falling On My Head
7. You Make Me Feel So Young
8. Temptation
9. The Way We Were
10. Sing

== Chart performance ==
=== Weekly charts ===
Chart (1975)	Peak position
UK Albums (OCC)	1

=== Year-end charts ===
Chart (1975)	Position
UK Albums (OCC)	11
Chart (1976)	Position
UK Albums (OCC)	44

== Certifications and sales ==
Region	Certification	Certified units/sales
United Kingdom (BPI)	Platinum	300,000^{^}
^{^} Shipments figures based on certification alone.
