= 20 Golden Greats (The Shadows album) =

Compilation album by The Shadows
- Released: 28 January 1977
- Genre: Rock
- Length: 49:02
- Label: EMI
- Producer: The Shadows

The Shadows chronology
| Rarities (1976) | 20 Golden Greats (1977) | The Best of The Shadows (1977) |

Alternative cover
- Dutch edition of the album (1980)

Professional ratings
Review scores
| Source | Rating |
|---|---|
| Allmusic | 4.5/5 stars |

20 Golden Greats is a compilation album by UK band The Shadows. It was released in 1977. The album was in UK charts for 43 weeks, where it gained number 1 position for 6 weeks.

The album was retitled 20 Greatest Hits for release in the Netherlands in 1980, where it reached number 2 on the album chart.

== Track listing ==
| No. | Title | Length |
|---|---|---|
| 1. | "Apache" | 2:52 |
| 2. | "Man of Mystery" | 2:00 |
| 3. | "The Frightened City" | 2:20 |
| 4. | "Guitar Tango" | 2:59 |
| 5. | "Kon-Tiki" | 1:54 |
| 6. | "Foot Tapper (Single version)" | 2:26 |
| 7. | "Genie with the Light Brown Lamp" | 2:40 |
| 8. | "The War Lord" | 2:15 |
| 9. | "A Place in the Sun" | 2:12 |
| 10. | "Atlantis" | 2:47 |
| 11. | "Wonderful Land" | 2:08 |
| 12. | "F.B.I." | 2:19 |
| 13. | "The Savage" | 2:27 |
| 14. | "Geronimo" | 2:20 |
| 15. | "Shindig" | 2:18 |
| 16. | "Stingray" | 2:33 |
| 17. | "Theme for Young Lovers" | 2:38 |
| 18. | "The Rise and Fall of Flingel Bunt" | 2:47 |
| 19. | "Maroc 7" | 2:43 |
| 20. | "Dance On!" | 2:24 |

== Charts ==
=== Weekly charts ===
| Chart (1977–85) | Peak position |
|---|---|
| Australian Albums (Kent Music Report) | 52 |
| Dutch Albums (Album Top 100) | 2 |
| New Zealand Albums (RMNZ) | 26 |
| UK Albums (OCC) | 1 |

=== Year-end charts ===
| Chart (1977) | Position |
|---|---|
| UK Albums (OCC) | 2 |

== Certifications and sales ==
| Region | Certification | Certified units/sales |
|---|---|---|
| United Kingdom (BPI) | Platinum | 300,000^{^} |
^{^} Shipments figures based on certification alone.
