= Glen Campbell's Twenty Golden Greats =

Twenty Golden Greats

Greatest hits album by Glen Campbell
- Released: 1976
- Genre: Country
- Label: EMI
- Producer: Al De Lory; Jimmy Bowen; Dennis Lambert; Brian Potter

Glen Campbell chronology
'Rhinestone Cowboy'	Twenty Golden Greats	'Bloodline'

Glen Campbell's Twenty Golden Greats is a country music compilation album of twenty previously released songs spanning the years 1967 to 1975. It is the second in the E.M.I. 'T.V. Concept' series of 20 track definitive albums. It was released in 1976, and was Glen Campbell's biggest selling album in the UK, reaching the top of the UK Albums Chart and staying on the chart for 27 weeks. After Campbells death in August 2017, the album once again was on the UK Albums Chart peaking at 54.

== Track listing ==
Side 1:

1. "Rhinestone Cowboy" (Larry Weiss)
2. "Both Sides Now" (Joni Mitchell)
3. "By the Time I Get to Phoenix" (Jimmy Webb)
4. "Gentle on My Mind" (John Hartford)
5. "Too Many Mornings" (Place)
6. "Wichita Lineman" (Jimmy Webb)
7. "One Last Time" (D. & D. Addrisi)
8. "Don't Pull Your Love/Then You Can Tell Me Goodbye" (Dennis Lambert, Brian Potter, John D. Loudermilk)
9. "Reason to Believe" (Tim Hardin)
10. "It's Only Make Believe" (Conway Twitty, Jack Nance)

Side 2:

1. "Honey Come Back" (Jimmy Webb)
2. "Give Me Back That Old Familiar Feeling" (Billy C. Graham)
3. "Galveston" (Jimmy Webb)
4. "Dreams of the Everyday Housewife" (Chris Gantry)
5. "The Last Thing on My Mind" (Paxton)
6. "Where's the Playground Susie" (Jimmy Webb)
7. "Try a Little Kindness" (Sapaugh, Austin)
8. "Country Boy (You Got Your Feet In L.A.) (Dennis Lambert, Brian Potter)
9. "All I Have to Do Is Dream" (Boudleaux Bryant) with Bobbie Gentry
10. "Amazing Grace" (John Newton)
- Track listing source:

== Charts ==
Chart	Entry date	Peak position	No. of weeks
UK Albums Chart	November 20, 1976	1	6 (Note: The album was on the charts for a total of 27 weeks, with 6 of those weeks at number 1)
UK Albums Chart	August 17, 2017	54	1
