= Arcade Records =

British record label (1972–2001)

- Founded: 1972; 54 years ago
- Defunct: 2001; 25 years ago
- Status: Sold to Roadrunner Records
- Genre: Various
- Country of origin: Netherlands

Arcade Records was a British record company specialised in multi-artist compilation albums (often in the mid-price or budget price ranges), founded in 1972. In the 1970s, it found itself in direct competition with K-tel and other compilation labels. Some Arcade albums reached Number 1 but have never had an official UK release on CD...These are 20 Fantastic Hits, The Best Of Roy Orbison & Jim Reeves 40 Golden Greats. In the 1980s, the original company was sold to Dutch entrepreneur Herman Heinsbroek, who expanded it into a worldwide multi-media company.

== History ==
Arcade Records was founded in 1972 by Laurence Myers, a British music industry professional who had been working in music management and production for various top British artists such as The Animals, David Bowie and The Rolling Stones. In the early 1970s, he realised that many music consumers were hometaping their favourite songs in order to create a mixtape of current top hits or the best songs by one artist. Myers copied this trend by releasing multi-artist and one-artist compilation albums.

Arcade currently serves as a digital platform which compiles playlists for Spotify based on Arcade's catalogues.

== See also ==
- K-tel
- List of record labels

== Sources ==
- Arcade on Rate Your Music
- Arcade discography
- Roadrunner Arcade Music discography
