= Jon English discography =

English born Australian singer and actor

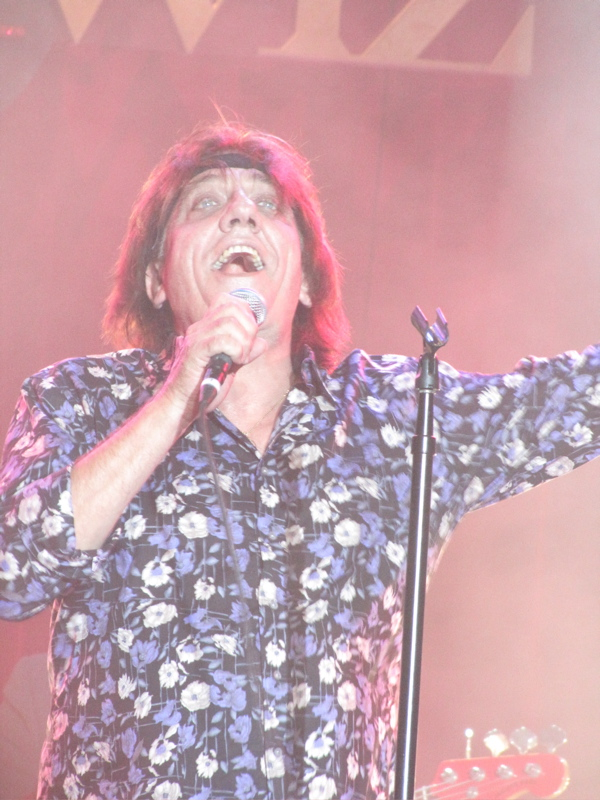
- English singing at Royal Theatre, Canberra, in December 2011
- Studio albums: 11
- Soundtrack albums: 1
- Live albums: 2
- Compilation albums: 8
- Singles: 39
- Box sets: 5
- Cast recordings: 5

The discography of English-born, Australian singer, songwriter, musician and actor, Jon English. He is best known for his role in the 1978 miniseries, Against the Wind and single "Six Ribbons". English died in March 2016.

== Albums ==
=== Studio albums ===
Year	Title	Peak chart positions				Certifications
Year	Title	AUS	NZ	NOR	SWE	Certifications
1973	Wine Dark Sea: Released: March 1973; Label: Warm and Genuine	53	—	—	—	
1974	It's All a Game: Released: 1974; Label: Warm and Genuine	47	—	—	—	
1976	Hollywood Seven: Released: 1976; Label: Polydor Records	20	—	—	—	
1977	Minutes to Midnight: Released: March 1977; Label: Polydor Records	33	—	—	—	
1978	Words Are Not Enough: Released: 1978; Label: Polydor Records	28	—	—	—	
1980	Calm Before the Storm: Released: April 1980; Label: Mercury Records/Frituna Records	17	9	6	—	NZ: Gold
1981	In Roads: Released: 1981; Label: Mercury Records/Frituna Records	58	—	4	35	
1982	Jokers and Queens (with Marcia Hines): Released: July 1982; Label: Midnight Records	36	—	—	—	
1983	Some People...: Released: 1983; Label: Midnight Records / Frituna Records	35	—	36	—	
1987	Dark Horses: Released: July 1987; Label: Midnight Records/ Frituna	84	—	—	—	
1989	Busking: Released: 1989; Label: Midnight Records/ RCA Records	—	—	—	—	
"—" denotes releases that did not chart.

=== Soundtrack albums ===
Year	Title	Peak chart positions				Certifications
Year	Title	AUS	NZ	NOR	SWE	Certifications
1978	Against the Wind (with Mario Millo): Released: 1978; Label: Polydor Records, Frituna	10	4	1	4	AUS:2xGold

=== Live albums ===
Year	Title	Peak chart positions	
Year	Title	AUS	NZ
1982	Beating the Boards: Released: April 1982; Label: Midnight Records/Frituna	24	39
2024	Live at Billboard 1981 (with The Foster Brothers): Released: 2 February 2024; Label: Blackbox Records	-	-

=== Compilations ===
Year	Title	Peak chart positions				Certifications
Year	Title	AUS	NZ	NOR	SWE	Certifications
1979	English History: Released: August 1979; Label: Mercury Records/ Frituna Records	4	3	1	17	AUS: Platinum; NZ: Platinum
1983	Modern English: 16 Great Hits: Released: December 1983; Label: J&B Records	27	—	—	—	
1993	The Best of Jon English: Released: 1993; Label: RCA Records / BMG	68	—	—	—	
2001	English History II: Released: 2001; Label: Universal Records	—	—	—	—	
2007	Mot Alle Vindar/Six Ribbons: Norway only release; Released: 2007; Label: MBN Music Business Norway	—	—	33	—	
2008	Legends: Released: 9 August 2008; Label:	—	—	—	—	
2011	Six Ribbons - The Ultimate Collection: Released: 6 May 2011; Label: FanFare Records/Ambition Records	17	—	—	—	
2016	History: Released: 23 July 2016; Label: FanFare Records/ Ambition Records; Limited to 500 copies/ Vinyl only	—	—	—	—	
2026	Rarities: Released: 27 March 2026; Label: Ambition Records	—	—	—	—	
"—" denotes releases that did not chart.

=== Box sets ===
Year	Title	Peak chart positions
Year	Title	AUS
2008	The Great Jon English: Released: 2008; Label: Destra Music (CDR1105); Format 3×CD	—
2012	Anthology 1973 - 1976: Released: 2012; Label:Fanfare Records; Format 4×CD	—
2012	Anthology 1977 - 1983: Released: 2012; Label:Fanfare Records; Format 4×CD	—
2013	Black Label: Released: 2013; Label:Fanfare Records; Format 5×CD + 1×DVD	96
2016	Anthology 1986-2000: Released: 2016; Label:Fanfare Records; Format 3×CD	—

=== Cast albums ===
Year	Title	Peak chart positions
Year	Title	AUS
1972	Jesus Christ Superstar (Original Australian Cast Recording): Released: 1972; Label: MCA Records (MAPS-6244); Format LP, CS	13
1974	Ned Kelly (The Rock Opera): Released: April 1974; Label: Hamlyn Group (HG001); Format LP, CS	55
1994	The Pirates of Penzance (Australian Cast Recording): Released: 1994; Label: EMI (4797752); Format 2xCD	–
2000	Buskers and Angels: Released: 2000; Label: B&A (001); Format CD	–
2012	The Rock Show: Released: 6 July 2012; Label: Ambition Entertainment, Fanfare (FANFARE001)	-

== Singles ==
List of singles, with selected chart positions
Year	Title	Peak chart positions				Certification	Album
Year	Title	AUS	NZ	NOR	SWE	Certification	Album
1973	"Handbags and Gladrags"	50	—	—	—		Wine Dark Sea
1973	"Close Every Door"	—	—	—	—		Wine Dark Sea
1974	"Band Together"	—	—	—	—		Ned Kelly soundtrack
1974	"Turn the Page"	20	7	—	—		It's All a Game
1975	"Lovin' Arms"	55	—	—	—		Hollywood Seven
1976	“Hollywood Seven"	13	—	—	18		Hollywood Seven
1976	“I'm a Survivor”	87	—	—	—		Hollywood Seven
1976	"Laid Back in Anger" (with Trevor White and the Superstar band)	—	—	—	—		N/A
1977	"Behind Blue Eyes"	—	—	—	—		Minutes To Midnight
1977	"Lay It All Down"	46	—	—	—		Minutes To Midnight
1977	“Everytime I Sing a Love Song”	—	—	—	—		Minutes To Midnight
1978	"Same Old Feeling Again"	—	—	—	—		Words are Not Enough
1978	"Words Are Not Enough"	6	28	—	—		Words are Not Enough
1978	"Nights in Paradise"	44	—	—	—		Words are Not Enough
1978	"Six Ribbons"	5	3	—	—	AUS: Gold	Against the Wind soundtrack
1979	“Get Your Love Right”	27	3	4	20		English History
1979	“Hot Town”	11	—	—	—		Calm Before the Storm
1980	"Carmilla”	27	—	—	—		Calm Before the Storm
1981	"Hold Back the Night"	88	—	—	—		Calm Before the Storm (international version)
1981	"Straight from the Heart"	72	—	—	—		In Roads
1981	"The Shining"	—	—	—	—		In Roads
1981	"Six Ribbons" (re-release) / “Mot alla vindar”	—	—	1	4		Mot alla vindar
1982	"Josephine (Too Many Secrets)"	—	—	9	—		In Roads
1982	"Beating the Boards”	96	—	—	—		Beating the Boards
1982	"Jokers & Queens” (with Marcia Hines)	62	—	—	—		Jokers and Queens
1983	"Some People (Have All The Fun)"	50	—	—	—		Some People...
1983	"Tempted"	—	—	—	—		Some People...
1983	"Waterloo"	96	—	—	—		Some People...
1984	"Every Beat of My Heart" (with Renée Geyer)	—	—	—	—		Street Hero soundtrack
1985	"Emotion"	—	—	—	—		Dark Horses
1987	"Dark Horse"	—	—	—	—		Dark Horses
1987	"Another Brand New Day"	—	—	—	—		Dark Horses
1988	"We'll Be There"	—	—	—	—		N/A
1990	"Always the Busker"	—	—	—	—		Busking
1990	"High Windows"	—	—	—	—		Busking
1990	"Love Has Power"	—	—	—	—		Paris soundtrack
1993	"All Together Now"	128	—	—	—		single only
1994	“Stand by Me"	—	—	—	—		single only
2011	"The Parramatta Eels theme song" (with Eric Grothe)	—	—	—	—		single only
"—" denotes releases that did not chart.

=== Other singles ===
List of singles as featured artist, with selected chart positions
Title	Year	Peak chart positions
Title	Year	AUS
"The Garden" (as Australia Too)	1985	22
"You're Not Alone" (as Australian Olympians)	1988	23

== Other appearances ==
List of other non-single song appearances
Title	Year	Album
"Nights in Paradise"	1979	Thin Lizzy Live at Sydney Harbour '78
Medley "Turn The Page, Six Ribbons, Hollywood Seven, Superstar" (live)	1979	The Concert of the Decade (Mushroom)
"Straight Ahead"	1984	The Coolangatta Gold (Original Motion Picture Score) (Starcall Victor)
"A Fortunate Life" (with Mario Millo)	1986	A Fortunate Life (Polydor)
"The Scorn of Women"	1993	Going Home (ABC / PolyGram)
"A Happy Sound" (with David Atkins and Cliff Coy)	1999	A Christmas Gift (EMI)
"This Holy Christmas Night" (with John Bettison, Genevieve Davis, Doug Parkinson & The Australian Girls Choir)	1999	A Christmas Gift (EMI)
"If We Care" (with David Atkins, Jackie Love, George Spartels, Cliff Coy & The Australian Girls Choir	1999	A Christmas Gift (EMI)
"Turn The Page" (live)	2003	Gimme Ted – The Ted Mulry Benefit Concerts (Warner)
"Hollywood 7" (live)	2003	Gimme Ted – The Ted Mulry Benefit Concerts (Warner)
Medley "Words Are Not Enough" / "Six Ribbons" (live)	2006	The Countdown Spectacular Live (Liberation / ABC)
"Hollywood 7" (live)	2006	The Countdown Spectacular Live (Liberation / ABC)
"Turn the Page" (live)	2008	Concert For Max - The Benefit Concert For Max Merritt (Destra Music)
"Tempted" (live)	2008	Concert For Max - The Benefit Concert For Max Merritt (Destra Music)
"Sand" (with Gemma Ray)	2012	The RocKwiz Duets (SBS / Renegade)
"In Flanders Fields" / "The Legacy Ode"	2017	Remembrance (A Collection of Poems & Music Dedicated To The Soldiers Of World War One) (Sony)
