= Six Ribbons - The Ultimate Collection =

Greatest hits album by Jon English
- Released: 6 May 2011
- Recorded: 1973–1993
- Genre: Rock, pop
- Length: 144:23
- Label: Ambition Entertainment

Jon English chronology
The Great Jon English (2008)	Six Ribbons - The Ultimate Collection (2011)	The Rock Show (2012)

Six Ribbons - The Ultimate Collection is a digitally remastered greatest hits album released in May 2011 by Australian musician, Jon English. It includes tracks from his entire career, commencing with his debut single, "Handbags and Gladrags" from 1973.

The album made its ARIA Chart debut in March 2016 at number 23, following his death.

The album is scheduled to be re-released on 27 March 2026.

== Track listing ==
CD1

No.	Title	Writer(s)	Album	Length
1.	"Six Ribbons"	Jon English	Against the Wind soundtrack	3:13
2.	"Turn the Page"	Bob Seger	It's All a Game	4:28
3.	"Get Your Love Right"	Alan David; Lionel Martin	English History	3:25
4.	"All Together Now"	English	The Best of Jon English	2:56
5.	"Some People (Have All the Fun)"	English; John Dallimore	Some People...	3:54
6.	"Hot Town"	Graeme Connors; Mike Wade	Calm Before the Storm	3:44
7.	"Sandcastles"	English	Hollywood Seven	3:07
8.	"Handbags and Gladrags"	Mike d'Abo	Wine Dark Sea	5:20
9.	"Carmilla"	English	Calm Before the Storm	3:45
10.	"Lovin' Arms"	Tom Jans	Hollywood Seven	3:02
11.	"You Might Need Somebody"	Nan O’Bryne; Tom Snow	In Roads	3:35
12.	"Survivor"	English	Calm Before the Storm	3:30
13.	"Touch & Go"	English	In Roads	3:28
14.	"She Was Real"	English	Some People…	7:13
15.	"Another Brand New Day"	English	Dark Horses	5:02
16.	"Wine Dark Sea"	English	Wine Dark Sea	3:30
17.	"Oh, Paris"	English; David Mackay	Paris (soundtrack)	3:43
18.	"Love Has Power"	English; Mackay	Paris	3:58

CD2

No.	Title	Writer(s)	Album	Length
1.	"Beating the Boards" (live)	A. C. Payne; Jamie Dalglish; P. C. Stretch	Beating the Boards	3:57
2.	"Words Are Not Enough"	Garry Paige, Mark Punch	Words Are Not Enough	3:28
3.	"Hold Back the Night"	Tony Scuito	Calm Before the Storm	4:59
4.	"Dark Horses"	English	Dark Horses	3:54
5.	"Minutes to Midnight"	English	Minutes to Midnight	5:01
6.	"Same Old Feeling Again"	English; S. Rattray	Words Are Not Enough	3:01
7.	"Josephine (Too Many Secrets)"	English; Tim Friese-Greene	In Roads	4:10
8.	"Jokers & Queens" (with Marcia Hines)	English; Charlie Hull	Jokers and Queens	3:40
9.	"Hollywood Seven"	Gloria Sklerov; Harry Lloyd	Hollywood Seven	4:52
10.	"Always the Busker"	English	Busking	4:22
11.	"Lay It All Down"	Barry Goldberg; Will Jennings	Minutes to Midnight	3:33
12.	"Share the End"	Carly Simon	Wine Dark Sea	4:56
13.	"Beautiful Loser" (live)	Bob Seger	Beating the Boards	4:49
14.	"Move Better in the Night"	Chris Thompson; Robbie McIntosh; Stevie Lange	In Roads	4:38
15.	"Behind Blue Eyes"	Pete Townshend	Minutes to Midnight	4:57
16.	"Everytime I Sing a Love Song"	Gloria Sklerov; Phyllis Molinary	Minutes to Midnight	4:01
17.	"Glass Houses"	English	Dark Horses	4:18

== Charts ==
Chart (2016)	Peak position
Australian Albums (ARIA)	17

== Release history ==
Region	Date	Format	Edition(s)	Label	Catalogue
Australia	6 May 2011	2× CD; digital download	Standard	FanFare	FANFARE022
Australia	27 March 2026	2× CD	Standard		
