= The Best of Jon English =

Compilation album by Jon English
- Released: May 1993
- Genres: Pop rock; soft rock
- Length: 80:23
- Label: RCA/BMG

Jon English chronology
Busking (1989)	The Best of Jon English (1993)	Buskers and Angels (2000)

The Best of Jon English is a compilation album released in Australian by RCA Records/BMG. The album was released in May 1993, celebrating the 20th anniversary of his first solo album, Wine Dark Sea. The album peaked at number 68 on the Australian ARIA Charts.

== Track listing ==
CD/ Cassette (74321126802)

1. "All Together Now" (Jon English) - 3:02
2. "You Might Need Somebody" (Tom Snow, Nan O'Bryne, Chris Gilby) - 3:37
3. "Some People (Have All The Fun)" (John Dallimore, English) - 3:51
4. "Get Your Love Right" (Alan David, Lionel Martin) - 3:26
5. "Hot Town" (Graeme Connors, Mike Wade) - 3:48
6. "Handbags and Gladrags" (Mike d'Abo) - 5:19
7. "Always the Busker" (English) - 4:25
8. "Same Old Feeling Again" (English, S Rattray)- 3:00
9. "Carmilla" (English) - 4:01
10. "Lay it All Down" (Barry Goldberg, Will Jennings) - 3:35
11. "Superstar" (Tim Rice, Andrew Lloyd Webber) - 3:12
12. "She Was Real" (English) - 7:17
13. "Turn the Page" (Bob Seger) - 4:30
14. "Josephine (Too Many Secrets)" (English, Tim Friese-Greene) - 4:10
15. "Loving Arms" (Tom Jans) - 3:02
16. "Minutes to Midnight" (English) - 5:02
17. "Words Are Not Enough" (Garry Paige, Mark Punch) - 3:31
18. "Hollywood Seven" (Gloria Sklerov, Harry Lloyd) - 4:52
19. "Six Ribbons" (English) - 3:15

== Charts ==
Chart (1993)	Peak position
Australian ARIA Chart	68
