= Modern English: 16 Great Hits =

Compilation album by Jon English
- Released: December 1983
- Genres: pop; rock; soft rock
- Labels: J&B

Jon English chronology
Some People... (1983)	Modern English: 16 Great Hits (1983)	Dark Horses (1987)

Modern English: 16 Great Hits is a compilation album released by Australian recording artist Jon English. The album was released in December 1983 and peaked at number 27 on the Australian Kent Music Report in January 1984.

== Track listing ==
Vinyl/ Cassette (JB157)

Side A

1. "Hot Town" (Graeme Connors, Mike Wade)
2. "Beating the Board" (A.C. Payne, J.G. Dalglish, P.C. Stretch)
3. "Hold Back the Night" (A. Scuito)
4. "Josephine (Too Many Secrets)" (Jon English, Tim Friese-Greene)
5. "Words Are Not Enough" (Garry Paige, Mark Punch)
6. "Get Your Love Right" (Alan David, Lionel Martin)
7. "Jokers and Queens" (with Marcia Hines) (Charlie Hull, Jon English)
8. "You've Lost That Lovin' Feeling" (with Marcia Hines) (Phil Spector, Barry Mann, Cynthia Weil)

Side B

1. "Turn the Page" (Bob Seger)
2. "Hollywood Seven" (Gloria Sklerov, Harry Lloyd)
3. "Carmilla" (Jon English)
4. "The Shining" (Jon English, Greg Henson)
5. "Straight from the Heart" (Bryan Adams)
6. "I Can't Turn You Loose" (Otis Redding)
7. "Beautiful Loser" (Bob Seger)
8. "Six Ribbons" (Jon English)

== Charts ==
Modern English peaked at number 27 on the Kent Music Report in January 1984.

Chart (1983/84)	Peak position
Australian Kent Music Report	27
