= History (Jon English album) =

Greatest hits album by Jon English
- Released: 23 July 2016
- Recorded: 1973–1992
- Genres: Pop, classic rock, folk, pub rock, country
- Label: FanFare /Ambition Entertainment
- Producer: Robie Porter

Jon English chronology
| The Rock Show (2012) | History (2016) | Rarities (2026) |

History is a greatest hits album from Australian recording artist, Jon English. The album was limited edition double vinyl, limited to just 500 copies, each individually numbered.

== Background ==
Jon English had been working to release his greatest hits on vinyl, titled History. Robert Rigby of FanFare said "His first foray into the current vinyl resurgence, something he was incredibly excited about". English died on 9 March 2016, before the album was complete.

== Track listing ==
Side A

1. "Hot Town" (Graeme Connors, Mike Wade)
2. "Get Your Love Right" (Alan David, Lionel Martin)
3. "Words Are Not Enough" (Garry Paige, Mark Punch)
4. "Wine Dark Sea" (Jon English)
5. "She Was Real" (Jon English)

Side B

1. "Turn The Page" (Bob Seger)
2. "Carmilla" (Jon English)
3. "Lovin' Arms" (Tom Jans)
4. "Handbags and Gladrags" (Mike d'Abo)
5. "Some People (Have All The Fun)" (John Dallimore, Jon English)

Side C

1. "Survivor" (Jon English)
2. "Behind Blue Eyes" (Pete Townsend)
3. "You Might Need Somebody" (Tom Snow)
4. "Everytime I Sing a Love Song" (Gloria Sklerov, Phyllis Molinary)
5. "Hollywood Seven" (Gloria Sklerov, Harry Lloyd)

Side D

1. "All Together Now" (Jon English)
2. "Lay It All Down" (Barry Goldberg, Will Jennings)
3. "Sandcastles" (Jon English)
4. "Jokers & Queens" (Charlie Hull, Jon English)
5. "Superstar (You Promised Me)" (Jon English)
6. "Six Ribbons" (Jon English)

== Release history ==
| Region | Date | Format | Edition(s) | Label | Catalogue |
|---|---|---|---|---|---|
| Australia | 23 July 2016 | 2xVinyl | Limited | FanFare / Ambition Entertainment | FANFARE227 |
