= English History (album) =

Greatest hits album by Jon English
- Released: August 1979
- Genres: Pop; rock; soft rock
- Labels: Mercury, Frituna

Jon English chronology
Against the Wind (1978)	English History (1979)	Calm Before the Storm (1980)

Singles from Words Are Not Enough
- 1. "Get Your Love Right" Released: May 1979

Alternative cover
- Scandinavian cover

English History is the first greatest hits album released by Australian recording artist Jon English. The album was released in August 1979 and made history at the time by becoming the largest selling double album in Australia. The album sold over 180,000 copies in Australia.

It includes tracks from his five studio albums and two soundtrack albums to date. "Get Your Love Right" was released as the lead single in May 1979, peaking within the top 5 in New Zealand and Norway.

== Track listing ==
Australian Vinyl/ Cassette (9198 178)

1. "Get Your Love Right" - 3:28
2. "Wine Dark Sea" - 3:42
3. "Words Are Not Enough" - 3:34
4. "Turn the Page" - 4:31
5. "Minutes to Midnight" - 5:05
6. "Hollywood Seven" - 4:53
7. "Same Old Feeling Again" - 3:01
8. "Lovin' Arms" - 3:04
9. "Superstar" - 4:15
10. "Handbags and Gladrags" - 5:19
11. "Laughing at the Guru" - 3:48
12. "Every Time I Sing a Love Song" - 4:01
13. "Nights In Paradise" - 5:00
14. "Lay it All Down" - 3:35
15. "Sandcastles" - 3:01
16. "Behind Blue Eyes" - 4:57
17. "Six Ribbons" - 3:14

Scandinavian Vinyl/Cassette (FRLP-162)

Side A

1. "Hollywood Seven" - 4:52
2. "Words are Not Enough" - 3:38
3. "Behind Blue Eyes" - 4:53
4. "Wine Dark Sea" - 3:40
5. "Superstar" - 4:12
6. "Turn the Page" - 4:29

Side B

1. "Play With Fire" - 5:33
2. "Get Your Love Right" - 3:28
3. "Everytime I Sing a Love Song" - 4:01
4. "Lay It All Down" - 3:32
5. "Lovin' Arms" - 3:01
6. "Minutes to Midnight" - 5:03

== Charts ==
The album charted in Norway and Sweden after "Against the Wind" had aired. It entered the charts in Norway at number 36 peaking at number 1 for three weeks in August 1981.

=== Weekly charts ===
Chart (1979–82)	Peak position
Australian Kent Music Report	4
New Zealand Albums (RMNZ)	3
Norwegian VG-lista Albums Chart	1
Swedish Albums Chart	17

=== Year-end charts ===
Chart (1979)	Position
New Zealand Albums (RMNZ)	41

== Certifications ==
Region	Certification	Certified units/sales
Australia (ARIA)	Platinum	180,000
New Zealand (RMNZ)	Platinum	15,000^{^}
^{^} Shipments figures based on certification alone.
