= Beating the Boards =

Live album by Jon English
- Released: April 1982
- Recorded: August 1981–February 1982
- Genres: Pop; rock
- Labels: Midnight, Frituna
- Producers: Jon English, David Williams and The Foster Brothers

Jon English chronology
In Roads (1981)	Beating the Boards (1982)	Jokers and Queens (1982)

Singles from Beating the Boards
- 1. "Beating the Boards" Released: April 1982

Beating the Boards is the first live album released by Australian musician, Jon English. The album was released in Australia in April 1982. The album was recorded live at the following performances across Australia, Norway and Denmark.

- Belmont Park Racecourse, Perth, 8 August 1981.
- Adelaide Festival Centre, Adelaide, 14 September 1981.
- Civic Theatre, Canberra, 25 September 1981.
- Newcastle Civic Theatre, Newcastle, 28 & 29 September 1981.
- National Hotel, Brisbane, 2 & 3 October 1981.
- Chateau Neuf, Oslo 25 & 26 October 1981.
- Tivoli Gardens, Copenhagen 28 October 1981.
- Musicians Club, Sydney, 13–14 December 1981
- Sidney Myer Music Bowl, Melbourne 26 February 1982.

== Track listing ==
Vinyl/ cassette (6357 067)

Side A

1. "Beating the Boards" (A.C. Payne, J.G. Dalglish, P.C. Stretch)
2. "I'm a Survivor" (Barry Mann, Cynthia Weil)
3. "Turn the Page" (Bob Seger)
4. "Been in Love Before" (Bill Kristian, Jon English)
5. "Lay it All Down" (Barry Goldberg, Will Jennings)

Side B

1. "The Shining" (Greg Henson, English)
2. "Josephine (Too Many Secrets)" (English, Tim Friese-Greene)
3. "Lovin' Arms" (Tom Jans)
4. "You Might Need Somebody" (Nan O'Byrne, Tom Snow)
5. "Get Your Love Right" (Alan David, Lionel Martin)

Side C

1. "Words Are Not Enough" (Paige, Punch)
2. "Beautiful Loser" (Seger)
3. "Against The Wind"/"Six Ribbons" (English)
4. "Hot Town" (Graeme Connors, Wade)

Side D

1. "Hollywood" (Gloria Sklerov, Harry Lloyd)
2. "Move Better in the Night" (Chris Thompson, Robbie Macintosh, Stevie Lange)
3. "I Can't Turn You Loose" (Otis Redding)
4. "Everytime I Sing a Love Song" (Sklerov, Molinary)

== Weekly charts ==
Chart (1982)	Peak position
Australian Kent Music Report Albums Chart	24
New Zealand Albums (RMNZ)	33
