= The Rock Show (Jon English album) =

Live album by Jon English
- Released: 6 July 2012
- Genres: Pop; rock; classic rock
- Labels: Sound One, EMI, Ambition Entertainment

Jon English chronology
Six Ribbons - The Ultimate Collection (2011)	The Rock Show (2012)	History (2016)

The Rock Show was a musical theatrical production that toured Australia between 2009 and 2012. Created by Stuart Smith, the production starred Smith, Jon English, Isaac Hayward, Paul Toole, Amy Vee, Andrew Sampford, Joe Kalou, Shaun Tarring, Kita Kerford, Natalya Bing, and Jonathan Sora-English. The production was a tribute to rock music from 1965 to 1980 and contained tracks originally recorded by AC/DC, Bob Dylan, The Who, The Beatles, The Rolling Stones and David Bowie among many other artists from the time period. English said, "I'm amazingly proud to be a part of this show. People come along to see me, not really knowing what to expect, but invariably leave saying they are just blown away by the world-class young talent on stage."

The show was released on DVD in May and on CD/digital download in July 2012.

At the ARIA Music Awards of 2012, the album was nominated for ARIA Award for Best Original Soundtrack, Cast or Show Album but lost to Straight to You – Triple J's Tribute to Nick Cave.

The production was followed by a series of similar shows including The Rock Show More, Rock Revolution and Trilogy of Rock. A fifth version, The Rock Show - Oz Edition, focusing solely on Australian music from the same time period, was to have toured in late 2016 but was canceled after English died in March of that year. The Rock Show - Oz Edition eventually began touring in 2022, with a tribute to English included in the set list. The revived production was produced by English's partner of the last nine years of his life, Coralea Cameron, who said she was "determined to see it through in Jon's honour."

== Track listing ==
Compact Disc/ Digital Download

CD 1

1. "Hey Hey, My My (Out of the Blue)"/"The Times They Are a-Changin’" - 4:17
2. "Let There Be Rock" - 3:32
3. "My Generation" - 4:06
4. "Two World Wars"/"Gloria" - 3:55
5. "San Francisco (Be Sure to Wear Flowers in Your Hair)"/"The Sound of Silence"/ "California Dreaming" - 4:30
6. "Mercedes Benz"/"Me and Bobby McGee" - 3:11
7. "Purple Haze"/"Somebody to Love"/"White Room" - 4:40
8. "A Whiter Shade of Pale" - 2:14
9. "Handbags and Gladrags" - 4:48
10. "Space Oddity"/"Rocket Man" - 5:12
11. "Beatles Medley"
  "Can’t Buy Me Love"/"Love Me Do"/"Help!"/"We Can Work It Out"/"Yesterday"/"Blackbird"/"Eleanor Rigby"/"I Am the Walrus"/"Octopus's Garden"/"Lady Madonna"/"Come Together"/"Hey Jude" -13:08

CD 2

1. "Won't Get Fooled Again"/"Kashmir" - 5:12
2. "Stairway to Heaven" - 5:38
3. "Guitar Riff Medley"
  "Smoke on the Water"/"Peter Gunn Theme"/"Day Tripper"/"Oh, Pretty Woman"/"Beat It"/"All Right Now"/"April Sun in Cuba"/"Eagle Rock"/"I Was Made for Lovin' You"/"You Shook Me All Night Long"/"You Really Got Me"/"Sunshine of Your Love"/"Smoke on the Water" - 4:55
4. "Lola" - 5:18
5. "See Me, Feel Me/"Pinball Wizard" - 2:33
6. "You Took the Words Right Out of My Mouth" - 2:38
7. "Wish You Were Here"/"Shine On You Crazy Diamond" - 5:45
8. "Rolling Stones Medley"
  "Honky Tonk Woman"/"Ruby Tuesday"/"Paint it Black"/"Get Off of My Cloud"/"(I Can't Get No) Satisfaction"/"Jumping Jack Flash"/"Brown Sugar"/"You Can't Always Get What You Want" - 15:20
9. "Six Ribbons"/"Turn The Page"/"Hollywood Seven" - 8:50
10. "Bohemian Rhapsody" - 5:31
11. "With a Little Help From My Friends'/"Superstar" - 7:17

== Show reviews ==
- "Light years away from the usual tired tribute show…. brilliantly conceived and executed." City News Canberra
- "Jon English and The Rock Show has definitely been one of the best live performances I have seen." Fifty Plus Lifestyle Magazine
- "I haven't seen so much hair, raw energy and young talent since the original performance of HAIR!. Jon English is the lynch pin, still charming and dashing and energetic…. The audience adored it." Radio 3MDR Melbourne
- "The troupe mixed theatre and rock exquisitely … they were having fun and it showed." The Examiner Launceston
- "A fantastic night of musical memories performed by some of the most talented people this country has to offer." Easymix Ten-71, Bendigo
- "It is Jon English who elevates the show from a club cover band to an experience, with his unique and masterful stagecraft." CX Magazine
- "Fantastic value for money musically, and a lot of fun, with the rock history stories and the banter between the ‘old man’ and his young crew keeping the crowd laughing as well as rocking on." Newcastle Herald
- "English's brilliant group of vibrant and versatile young musicians … They sing; they switch instruments, they cavort across the stage. Quite simply, they rock." Canberra Times

== Release history ==
Region	Date	Format	Edition(s)	Label	Catalogue
Australia	18 May 2012	DVD	Standard	FanFare/Ambition Entertainment	FANFARE059
Australia	6 July 2012	CD; digital download	Standard	Sound One, Ambition Entertainment, EMI Records	9324690056811
Australia	6 September 2024	2×CD + 2×DVD	Collectors Edition	Ambition Entertainment	Ambition255
