= Buskers and Angels =

Soundtrack album by Jon English and Martine Monroe
- Released: September 2000
- Genre: Rock
- Length: 65:00
- Producer: Jon English

Jon English albums chronology
| The Best of Jon English (1993) | Buskers and Angels (2000) | English History II (2001) |

Buskers and Angels is a rock musical written by Australian rock musician Jon English. This was his second musical, following Paris in 1990. The show follows a busker going from the streets to stardom as well as canvassing the pitfalls of the entertainment industry for women. English said "It's probably the most misogynistic industry left" and cites his feisty mother and suffragette grandmother as role models, and points out that both his musicals deliberately feature "forthright, strong women trapped by circumstances but not by their own sex. And I sort of miss that badly in a lot of musicals."

The show premiered in Newcastle in September 2000 and closed in Perth in February 2001 with Belgian born Martine Monroe playing the lead female character of Angel alongside English. The musical received warm reviews. The album includes Jon English's son Jonathan English on bass.

The album was released digitally in 2011.

== Plot ==
A Busker enjoys playing music on a street corner, saying he is content with his position because he can "play and sing, and make enough to eat and keep a roof over [his] head." (Always the Busker.) When a protest march passes his corner (Out On My Corner,) he meets a girl called Lee who duets with him (Fancy This.) Lee expresses a desire to eventually move beyond street singing, though the Busker is skeptical.

The Busker teaches Lee his way of song writing (Do-Do Song.) As the weeks go by, and the pair continue to perform on the street corner, a nearby hot-dog seller named Harry decides to be their agent and get them higher level gigs. (Contacts) They end up playing a gig at a night club which the Busker enjoys despite initially being hesitant (20-20 Hindsight.)

Lee and the Busker begin a relationship (One Thing Leads to Another.) They spend the weeks working on the street corner and the evenings working at the night club. Harry gets the two an audition with a record label, though the manager is looking for a more risque act than Lee and the Busker. Lee is quite happy to take on this new persona and astonishes the Busker and the crowd with her performance of "Nature of the Beast." Harry's wife, Doris, gives Lee a card from Ashley T Roth, manager of the fictional Boogie Records. She contacts him and is told that she and Busker are to cut a demo for him the next day. Busker is worried that he'll miss peak hour on the corner, and heads off to perform while Lee is dressed in different outfits. (Splitting Image.) When Busker returns, he is introduced to Lee's new persona, Angel.

As the months pass, Lee and Busker record their first album together, while Busker continues to perform on the street. One day, Lee joins him again and presents copies of the album. Busker is irritated to find he has not been given credit for any of his songwriting contributions, and Ash tells Lee that if she is to be taken seriously as a professional recording artist, she can no longer busk. Busker ends his relationship with Lee when it's revealed she has to move down South (Dear Lee.)

After a casting couch style audition (Money Tree,) Angel makes her MTV debut to critical acclaim (Potential Angels.)

One year later, there are billboards of Angel around Busker's street corner, which he serenades (Try to be a Hero.)

Angel is humiliated on a television interview show, then by the print media who publish images of her naked on a beach after a tip-off from Ash.

Harry continues to try and make a star out of Busker, leading to him performing at a pensioner's dance contest (Roll Daddy Roll.) Busker decides he wants to go back to singing on the street, leaving Harry furious. Doris explains to Busker why she stays with Harry despite his mistreatment of her (The Guy For Me.)

The Busker is performing on his corner when a policeman tries to move him along for busking without a license, a law that has just been introduced. The policeman says the council will grant him a license if Angel can vouch for the fact that she used to busk with him. Busker writes her a letter in which he takes excessive liberties with regard to how well his life is going, something Lee does back in return (Doing Okay.)

Angel finds the celebrity lifestyle is taking its toll on her and is taking drugs given to her by Ash. Ash organizes for Harry and Doris to visit her. Doris suggests to Angel that the best thing for her is to go out for a while. Angel has time to reflect on the life she had before stardom (Love is the One Thing.)

Ash finds Busker and asks him if he has any more songs for Angel. Busker initially refuses as he has not received any royalties from the songs he had written for her first album, but eventually gives Ash a cassette. Ash returns down South and is furious that Angel has disobeyed him, so he increased her drug dosage (Palm of our Hands.) When Harry and Doris find Angel semi-conscious, Ash fires them.

Angel performs "Try to be a Hero" on television, but breaks down during the performance and flees to the Busker's corner (Fallen Angel.) When she gets there, she finds Busker is gone, and she takes all the pills in the bottle. Busker arrives and explains that he saw her performance on television and knew exactly where she would be. He promises to never leave her again, but Lee dies of a drug overdose (When I Was Younger.)

In an epilogue, the Busker explains that Angel's death resulted in her album reaching triple platinum. He also explains that he registered the songs he wrote for the album before Ash could, leaving him furious. Busker has benefited from the success of Angel's second album and continues to perform on his street corner (Street Beat.)

== Cast ==
The original album contains the following cast:

- Lee/Angel - Martine Monroe
- The Busker - Jon English
- Doris - Carol Starkey
- Ashley T Roth - Jay Collie
- The Agent - Marcus Pointon
- Splitting Image trio - Jay Collie, Janine Emerson, Blicka

A later stage production starred Amy Vee as Lee/Angel.

== Track listing ==
1. "Always the Busker" - 5:34
2. "Out On My Corner" - 2:20
3. "Fancy This" - 2:00
4. "The View Up There" - 2:21
5. "20-20 Hindsight" - 2:00
6. "Nothing to Hide" - 3:37
7. One Thing Leads to Another" - 1:50
8. "Nature of the Beast" (Jon English & Martine Monroe) - 3:55
9. "Life Is Like a Wheel" - 1:47
10. "Splitting Image" - 1:52
11. "Dear Lee" - 1:03
12. "Money Tree" (Jon English & Marcus Pointon) - 2:59
13. "Potential Angels" (Jon English & Martine Monroe) - 4:55
14. "Try to Be a Hero" - 2:40
15. "What's the View Like Up There?" (Jon English & Martine Monroe) - 2:54
16. "Roll Daddy Roll" (Jon English & Carol Starkey) - 2:27
17. "The Guy for Me" (Jon English & Carol Starkey)
18. "Doing Okay" (Jon English & Martine Monroe) - 4:18
19. "Love Is the One Thing" (Jon English & Carol Starkey) - 3:09
20. "Palm of Our Hands" (Jon English & Jay Collie) - 3:53
21. "Fallen Angel" (Jon English & Martine Monroe) -3:39
22. "When I Was Younger" - 1:07
23. "Street Beat" (Jon English & Martine Monroe) - 2:43
- all tracks written by Jon English, except "Splitting Image", "The Guy for Me" and "Love is the One Thing", written by English and David Mackay.
