= Words Are Not Enough =

Words Are Not Enough may refer to:

- "Words Are Not Enough" (song), a 2001 song by Steps
- Words Are Not Enough (album), a 1978 album by Jon English, or the title song
