= Minutes to Midnight (disambiguation) =

"Minutes to Midnight" is associated with the Doomsday Clock.

Minutes to Midnight may also refer to:

- Minutes to Midnight (Jon English album), 1977
- Minutes to Midnight (Linkin Park album), 2007
- Minutes to Midnight, a work by Robert Ward
- "Minutes to Midnight" (song), a 1984 song by Midnight Oil

== See also ==
- "Doomsday Clock" (song), the opening track from the Smashing Pumpkins album, Zeitgeist
- Doomsday Clock (comics), a superhero comic book limited series
- "2 Minutes to Midnight", a song by Iron Maiden from the 1984 album Powerslave
- "Five Minutes to Midnight", a song by Boys Like Girls from their 2006 self-titled debut album
- "Twenty Years to Midnight", an episode of the animated television series, The Venture Bros
