= Wish You Were Here (The Ten Tenors album) =

Studio album by The Ten Tenors
- Released: April 7, 2017
- Genre: Crossover jazz; vocal
- Length: 56:23
- Language: English
- Label: Sony Music Australia

The Ten Tenors chronology
In Mezzo al Mare (2016)	Wish You Were Here (2017)

Wish You Were Here is the twelfth studio album from Australian vocal group The Ten Tenors, released in April 2017. The album is a "homage" to many great artists who have deceased. The Ten Tenors say "This isn’t intended to be sombre, rather a celebration of the happiness these people brought to the world. Put simply, to all the lost artists, we wish you were here". In an interview with Today show on 10 April, the band say it was inspired by David Bowie's death.

The album was promoted with a national tour across August 2017 and peaked at number 18 on the ARIA Charts.

== Track listing ==
No.	Title	Writer(s)	Length
1.	"Wish You Were Here"	Roger Waters, David Gilmour	5:02
2.	"Imagine"	John Lennon	4:11
3.	"We Are the Champions"	Freddie Mercury	4:39
4.	"Hallelujah"	Leonard Cohen	4:41
5.	"The Way You Make Me Feel"	Michael Jackson	4:38
6.	"Never Tear Us Apart"	Andrew Farriss, Michael Hutchence	5:08
7.	"In Dreams"	Roy Orbison	4:27
8.	"I Wanna Dance with Somebody (Who Loves Me)"	George Merrill, Shannon Rubicam	3:52
9.	"Six Ribbons"	Jon English	3:51
10.	"Nothing Compares 2 U"	Prince	4:44
11.	"Valerie"	Abi Harding, Boyan Chowdhury, Dave McCabe, Russ Pritchard, Sean Payne	4:24
12.	"Heroes"	David Bowie, Brian Eno	6:46
Total length:			56:23

== Charts ==
Chart (2017–18)	Peak position
Australian Albums (ARIA)	18
New Zealand Albums (RMNZ)	3

== Release history ==
Region	Date	Label	Format	Catalogue number
Australia	7 April 2017	Frog in a Stock Sony Music Australia	CD, digital download	88985433712
