= Essgee Entertainment =

Essgee Entertainment is a professional performing and publishing company formed in 1981 in Australia. Its founder and chief executive officer is entertainer Simon Gallaher.

== History ==
Essgee began by financing and producing recording artists and recordings under licence to the Australian record company Festival Records. Within its first three years, the company had produced four Gold albums. Essgee then expanded into music publishing and concert promotion, beginning with national tours of Simon Gallaher's concerts. In 1990 Essgee produced two new recordings with Sony Music (Columbia Records), which also promoted its tours with major symphony orchestras.

In 1994, Essgee Entertainment produced its version of The Pirates of Penzance by Gilbert and Sullivan, which toured successfully. The Australian Broadcasting Corporation broadcast the production on television throughout Australia, and the video/DVD enjoyed triple platinum sales, becoming the top-selling music video in Australian history. The following year, the company produced a new version of The Mikado, which was also immediately successful both on stage and on video. In 1996, Essgee presented The Mikado throughout New Zealand, following this with a new production of Pirates. In 1997, Essgee introduced its adaptation of H.M.S. Pinafore in both Australia and New Zealand. All three Gilbert and Sullivan productions starred Gallaher and Jon English.

In 1998, Essgee presented a large-scale production of the operetta The Merry Widow by Franz Lehár in Brisbane Australia. It starred baritone Jeffrey Black as Danilo, soprano Helen Donaldson as the Widow, Gallaher as Camille and Susan Dunn as Valencienne, with narration by Jon English, who played Zeta. In some performances, Jason Barry-Smith appeared as Danilo. The production was repeated the next year in other major cities in Australia, in a new translation, starring Marina Prior as the Widow, John O'May as Danilo, Gallaher as Camille, Donaldson as Valencienne and Max Gillies as Zeta. The same year, it toured the musical A Funny Thing Happened On the Way to the Forum throughout Australia and New Zealand. At the same time, Essgee presented the play Master Class, starring Amanda Muggleton and directed by Rodney Fisher.

Essgee revived its Pirates in the 2001–2003 season and continues to license productions of its three Gilbert and Sullivan adaptations to theatre companies around the world. In 2004, the company presented a new musical called Eureka, premiering at the 2004 Melbourne International Arts Festival. This also starred Amanda Muggleton and was nominated for a Helpmann Award for Best Musical and six Green Room Awards. The company then co-produced concerts starring Julie Anthony and Gallaher. In 2007 Essgee released a CD with Gallaher and Anthony entitled Together at Last. It also presents musical theatre workshops. In 2008–2009, Essgee revived its version of The Mikado, earning favorable reviews. A reviewer in The Courier-Mail wrote, "suspend your loyalty to the original and there can be no quibble about this enjoyable, laugh-a-minute updated delivery."
