= Dark Horses (Jon English album) =

Studio album by Jon English
- Released: May 1987
- Genre: Pop rock
- Labels: Midnight, Frituna
- Producers: Jon English and Mario Millo

Jon English chronology
Modern English: 16 Great Hits (1983)	Dark Horses (1987)	Busking (1989)

Singles from Dark Horses
- 1. "Emotion" Released: September 1985; 2. "Dark Horses" Released: March 1987; 3. "Another Brand New Day" Released: July 1987

Dark Horses is the tenth studio album by Australian musician, Jon English. The album was co-produced by English and former Sebastian Hardie band member, Mario Millo. It was released in Australia in May 1987, following a 4-year break where he returned to the theatre playing in Gilbert and Sullivan's comic opera The Pirates of Penzance, winning three consecutive 'Entertainer of the Year' Mo Awards between 1983 and 1985.

Jon English wrote on the album sleeve “Oh, by the way Dark Horses is a bastardised metaphor meaning loosely; Whatever is possible will be achieved by someone or something least expected. When it happens, however, no one will be surprised...”

== Track listing ==
Vinyl/cassette (450599 1)

Side One

1. "Overture" (Jon English, Tony Mitchell, Garth Porter)
2. "Dark Horses" (Jon English)
3. "Treated Like a Lady" (Keith Kerwin)
4. "Winds of Limbo" (Jon English)
5. "I Can Do Better Than That" (Jon English, Keith Kerwin)
6. "The Best in Me" (Jon English, John Dallimore)

Side Two

1. "Another Brand New Day" (Jon English)
2. "Baby Got Style" (Peter Grimwood)
3. "Mr. Nice Guy" (Jon English, John Dallimore)
4. "Emotion" (Cos Russo)
5. "Glass Houses" (Jon English)

== Weekly charts ==
Chart (1987)	Peak position
Australian Kent Music Report Albums Chart	84
