= Ian Jones (author) =

Australian television writer and director and author (1931 – 2018)

- Born: Ian Edward Swainson Jones; 22 September 1931; Newcastle, New South Wales, Australia
- Died: 31 August 2018 (aged 86); Melbourne, Victoria, Australia
- Occupations: Screenwriter; director; author; historian
- Spouse: Bronwyn Binns

Ian Edward Swainson Jones (22 September 1931 – 31 August 2018) was an Australian television writer and director and an author specialising in the history of notorious outlaw Ned Kelly and his gang.

== Career ==
Jones had a long career in Australian television, and is best remembered for his writing and directing work at Crawford Productions on shows such as Homicide, Matlock Police, The Bluestone Boys and The Sullivans, and for Against the Wind, a highly successful mini-series, created in collaboration with Bronwyn Binns, which explored Australia's convict past.

Jones and his wife Bronwyn Binns created a portrayal of Ned Kelly and his associates when they produced the mini-series, The Last Outlaw, which was shown in 1980. He also wrote several reference books about the Kelly gang including the bestseller Ned Kelly: A Short Life and The Fatal Friendship: Ned Kelly, Aaron Sherritt and Joe Byrne. In his work, Jones draws extensively on oral history interviews with descendants of the members of the Kelly Gang, in addition to decades of archival research. Jones also co-wrote the screenplay for the 1970 biopic film Ned Kelly which starred Mick Jagger.

Jones died in Melbourne on 31 August 2018.

== Honours ==
In December 2006, Ian Jones was awarded the Longford Lyell Award by the Australian Film Institute in recognition of his enduring contribution to Australian screen culture.

== Works ==
- Jones, Ian; Stackpool, Walter (1986), The Light Horse, Hodder and Stoughton (published 1985), ISBN 0340377216
- Jones, Ian (1987), The Australian Light Horse, Time Life Books Australia in association with John Ferguson, ISBN 978-0-949118-06-6
- Mitchell, Elyne; Jones, Ian (1987), The Lighthorsemen, Penguin Books, ISBN 0140103880
- Jones, Ian (1992), The friendship that destroyed Ned Kelly : Joe Byrne & Aaron Sherritt, Lothian Pub, ISBN 978-0-85091-518-1
- Jones, Ian (1995), Ned Kelly : a short life, Lothian, ISBN 978-0-85091-631-7
- Jones, Ian (1999), Joshua : The Man They Called Jesus, Lothian, ISBN 085091812X
- Jones, Ian (2002), Ned: The Exhibition: Old Melbourne Gaol 2001-2002, Network Creative Services, ISBN 0958016224
- Jones, Ian (2003), The Fatal Friendship: Ned Kelly, Aaron Sherritt & Joe Byrne, Lothian, ISBN 073440543X
- Jones, Ian (2003), Ned Kelly: A Short Life (Revised ed.), Lothian Books, ISBN 0734405448
- Jones, Ian; Carrington, Thomas (2003), Ned Kelly: The Last Stand (edited), Lothian Books, ISBN 073440588X
- Jones, Ian (2007), A Thousand Miles of Battles: The Saga of the Australian Light Horse in WWI, ANZAC Day Commemoration Committee, ISBN 9780975712382
- Jones, Ian (2007), The Legend of the Light Horse, ANZAC Day Commemoration Committee, ISBN 9780980448009
- Jones, Ian (8 August 2014), The Kellys and Beechworth, Burke Museum Beechworth (published 2014), ISBN 9780646924755

=== Booklets ===
- Jones, Ian (2003), Ned Kelly: Beyond the Legend, BBMT Promotions

=== Published scripts ===
- Binns, Bronwyn; Jones, Ian (1978), Against the Wind, Heinemann Educational Australia, ISBN 0-85859-196-0

=== Contributed chapters ===
- "The Kellys and Beechworth", "Kelly the folk hero" and "A new view of Ned Kelly" In: Ned Kelly: Man and Myth edited by Colin F. Cave, Melbourne : Cassell (1968, ISBN 072691410X)
- "Guns of the Kelly Story" and "The Kelly Armour: Fact and Fantasy" in: The Last Outlaw by Les Carlyon, Melbourne, VIC : HSV7 (1980)

==== Introductions ====
- In: The Ned Kelly Encyclopaedia by Justin Corfield, South Melbourne, VIC : Lothian, (2003, ISBN 0734405960)
