= Helen Donaldson =

Australian operatic soprano

Helen Donaldson (born 14 March 1968 in Rockhampton, Queensland) is an Australian operatic soprano, best known for her performances of the heroines in Gilbert and Sullivan operas.

== Biography ==
Donaldson started singing at the age of seven, after winning an eisteddfod. She was trained at the Queensland Conservatorium of Music, Brisbane, and graduated with a Bachelor of Music and a Graduate Diploma in Opera. While at university, her roles included Phyllis in Gilbert and Sullivan's Iolanthe.

Her first professional role was as a chorus member and swing in The Phantom of the Opera in 1990. The role that gave her recognition in Australia was Mabel in Essgee Entertainment's The Pirates of Penzance (1994). A review of the video recording of this productio nin The Canberra Times stated: "Donaldson ... has a voice truly suited to light, lyric opera and, for my part, is a cut above the other cast in talent and vocal technique." Its soundtrack won a 1995 ARIA Award. Her other Essgee shows were The Mikado (as Yum-Yum), HMS Pinafore (as Josephine), A Funny Thing Happened on the Way to the Forum (1999, as Philia) and The Merry Widow (as Anna in Brisbane, in 1998; and as Valencienne in Melbourne, Victoria, Adelaide, South Australia, and Perth, Western Australia, in 1999).

Donaldson has performed in more than twenty operas, including Cinderella's Bad Magic as Cinderella, and Don Pasquale, variously in Russia, the United States and Brazil. In 2007, she returned to live in Caloundra, Queensland, Australia and rejoined Essgee, reprising the role of Yum-Yum in The Mikado in 2008 and 2009.

She has four children.
