= Simon Gallaher =

Australian musician

- Born: 24 October 1958 (age 68); Brisbane, Australia
- Occupations: Actor; singer; director; pianist

Simon Gallaher (born 24 October 1958) is an Australian singer, actor, director and pianist.

== Biography ==
Gallaher was born in Brisbane and educated at the Anglican Church Grammar School. and studied at the Queensland Conservatorium of Music. Whilst studying, he joined the Queensland Light Opera Company. In 1977 he appeared on The Mike Walsh Show, he had his own television program, The Simon Gallaher Show on ABC-TV (1982–83), in which he sang and played the piano.

In 1979, Simon appeared again on The Mike Walsh Show, singing "Australia Be Proud" with the Marist Singers of NSW, with Artistic Director Paul Bateman.

With his own musical theatre company Essgee Entertainment, Gallaher produced and acted in stage productions of The Pirates of Penzance, H.M.S. Pinafore, The Mikado, The Merry Widow and A Funny Thing Happened on the Way to the Forum, among others.

For most of the 1980s his song "Australia Be Proud" was heard at the conclusion of each broadcast day on television station CTC Canberra, accompanied by a montage of video clips from across Australia. He and Jackie Love had a hit record "My Friend" written by Neil Sedaka.

In 2014 Gallaher returned to the stage to be reunited with Jon English for the first time in many years as they performed in Spamalot for Harvest Rain Theatre Company at the Queensland Performing Arts Centre (QPAC). In 2015 he took over the role of The Wonderful Wizard of Oz in the Australian production of Wicked and opened with it at the commencement of the Brisbane season. Gallaher recently directed a new production of his version of The Pirates of Penzance, which played at the QPAC to celebrate the 30th Anniversary of the Arts Centre and of the show's original opening.

He retired as deputy chair on the board of trustees of QPAC in 2018 and has been reappointed to the board of the Queensland Theatre Company (QTC). In 2018 he was appointed to the board of the Queensland Symphony Orchestra. He was formerly the chair of Harvest Rain Theatre Company (2012–15). He is patron to many arts organisations, including The Queensland Show Choir, Queensland Youth Symphony Orchestra, Spotlight Theatre Company, Gold Coast Theatre Alliance and the Canberra Area Theatre Awards. He is a member of Live Performance Australia (LPA) and sits on the Helpmann Awards nominating panel for Musical Theatre.

== Personal life ==
Simon Gallaher married Lisa McKenney in 1990 and they have three children. She is the sister of Todd McKenney, with whom Gallaher had also had a relationship prior to marrying Lisa. They lived in Tamborine Mountain and had a property at Palm Beach on the Gold Coast. They separated in April 2019.

== Discography ==
=== Studio and live albums ===
List of albums, with Australian chart positions
Title	Album details	Peak chart positions
Title	Album details	AUS
Opening Night	Released: April 1981; Format: LP; Label: Festival Records (L 37580)	45
All in Good Time	Released: April 1982; Format: LP; Label: Festival Records (L 37839)	59
One Voice	Released: April 1983; Format: LP; Label: J&B (JB 135); Live album	15
Unforgettable	Released: May 1991; Format: LP, CD; Label: CBS (468306-2)	40
Rising	Released: April 1992; Format: CD; Label: CBS (473836-2)	-

=== Soundtrack and cast albums ===
List of compilations
Title	Album details
The Pirates of Penzance (Australian Cast Recording) (with Jon English, The Fabulous Singlettes & Toni Lamond)	Released: 1994; Format: CD; Label: EMI (479775 -2)
Cyrano De Bergerac The Musical (with Normie Rowe, Penny Hay, The Prestige Symphony Orchestra and singers)	Released: 2001; Format: CD; Label: Harmony (HM076)

=== Compilations albums ===
List of compilations
Title	Album details
Silver Anniversary Collection	Released: 2000; Format: CD; Label: ABC Music (529845-2)

=== Singles ===
List of singles, with selected chart positions
Year	Title	Peak chart positions	Album
Year	Title	AUS	Album
1980	"Sleeping Like a Baby"	-	non album single
1980	"I'm Really Only Singing for You"	-	Opening Night
1981	"Australia Be Proud" (with The Marist Singers of N.S.W.)	68	Opening Night
1981	"I'm Already Falling"	-	Opening Night
1982	"My Friend" (with Jackie Lowe)	27	All In Good Time
1984	"Please Don't Call" (with Jackie Lowe)	-	non album single

== Awards and nominations ==
=== Logie Awards ===
The Logie Awards (officially the TV Week Logie Awards) is an annual gathering to celebrate Australian television, sponsored and organised by magazine TV Week, with the first ceremony in 1959, known then as the TV Week Awards, the awards are presented in 20 categories representing both public and industry voted awards.

Year	Nominee / work	Award	Result
Logie Awards of 1981	Simon Gallagher - in The Mike Walsh Show (Nine Network)	Logie Award for Most Popular New Talent	Won

=== Mo Awards ===
The Australian Entertainment Mo Awards (commonly known informally as the Mo Awards), were annual Australian entertainment industry awards. They recognise achievements in live entertainment in Australia from 1975 to 2016. Gallaher won three awards in that time.

Year	Nominee / work	Award	Result (wins only)
1980	himself	Encouragement Award	Won
1981	himself	Vocal/ Instrumental Act	Won
1982	himself	Vocal/ Instrumental Act	Won

- Queenslander of the Year Commendation
- Advance Australia Award for his contributions to the arts
- Nominated for 2016 Helpmann award for Wicked (Best Male Actor in a Supporting Role in a Musical)

== Selected theatrical bibliography ==
- 1984–86 The Pirates of Penzance (performing - Frederic)
- 1985 Hello Dolly (performer)
- 1987 The Student Prince (performer - Karl Franz)
- 1988 My Fair Lady (performer - Freddy Eynsford-Hill)
- 1994 The Pirates of Penzance (creator of stage production, performing - Frederic) (the video of the stage production was accredited triple-platinum and the cast recording received an ARIA Award)
- 1996 The Mikado (creator of stage production) (also released on video)
- 1997 HMS Pinafore (creator of stage production) (also released on video)
- 1998 A Funny Thing Happened on the Way to the Forum (Producer)
- 1999 Master Class (Producer)
- 1998/99 Merry Widow (creator of stage production and performer - Camille)
- 2001 The Pirates of Penzance (created revival production)
- 2004 Eureka (producer in Association with Melbourne International Arts Festival)
- 2008/09 The Mikado (producer)
- 2012 Hairspray (performer)
- 2014 Spamalot (performer)
- 2015 Wicked (performer - Wizard) Brisbane and Perth
- 2015 The Pirates of Penzance (director)
