= Mario Millo =

Australian musician and composer (born 1955)

- Born: Mario Daniel Millo; May 1955 (age 71); Sydney, New South Wales, Australia
- Genres: Progressive, symphonic, rock
- Occupations: Musician, songwriter, composer
- Instruments: Guitar, mandolin, vocals
- Years active: 1969-current
- Labels: Festival, Polydor, Mercury, EMI / Wheatley, Powderworks / BMG
- Website: www.mariomillo.com

Mario Daniel Millo (born 17 May 1955) is an Australian musician and composer from Sydney, who was a member of symphonic rock group Sebastian Hardie from 1973 to their disbandment in 1977. Their debut album, Four Moments (1975) peaked at No. 13 on the Australian Kent Music Report Albums Chart. He has had a solo career and composed film and television soundtracks and scores. In 1978, he worked with Jon English on the soundtrack for the television series, Against the Wind and its related single, "Six Ribbons". Both album and single peaked in the Top 10 on the relevant Kent Music Report charts. The series had international release, known as Mot alla vindar/Mot alle vindar/Mod vinden (1980) in Scandinavian countries where the album and single reached No. 1 in Norway and No. 4 in Sweden. Millo's compositions have won Australian film industry awards for, The Lighthorsemen (1987) and television awards for, Brides of Christ (1991) and Changi (2001). Brides of Christ won an Australian Record Industry Association (ARIA) Music Award in 1992 for 'Best Original Soundtrack Album' - Millo was nominated for the same award in 1997 for G.P. and in 2002 for Changi.

== Biography ==
Mario Daniel Millo was born in May 1955, to Italian parents, and was raised in Sydney, New South Wales, Australia. He was taught to play mandolin at age five by his father, he learned guitar at eight and fronted his first band, The Menu, at Mitchell High School, Blacktown, when 12. The Menu had Millo on guitar and vocals, Mark Friedland on drums, Vince Moult on bass guitar and Brian Nicholls on organ. The band won the 1969 2SM Pepsi Pop Poll or 'Battle of the Bands' held at the Sydney Stadium. As a result, they signed a contract with a Sydney agency, and, renamed as The Clik, released a single, "La De Da" on Festival Records in November 1969. Their second single, "Mary Mary" was issued in March 1970, they were hired by Coca-Cola and, as The Fantasy, promoted orange-flavoured Fanta in a series of TV ads, "Fancy Nancy". The Fantasy toured Australia and New Zealand, but disbanded in 1971. Millo travelled around Europe for six months and returned to Australia in early 1972 to reform The Clik with a new line-up of Garry Adams on lead guitar, Doug Bligh on drums (both ex-Galadriel), and Phil Cogan on bass guitar. Justin McCoy replaced Adams on lead guitar, however The Clik separated in October 1973.

Millo joined the Sydney-based pop group Sebastian Hardie to replace their founding lead guitarist, Graham Ford after they had released a debut single, "All Right Now". With Millo, Sebastian Hardie included Alex Plavsic on drums and his brother Peter Plavsic on bass guitar. They released a second single, "Day After Day" in April 1974. By that stage, Toivo Pilt had joined on keyboards, Millo had taken on lead vocals, and Sebastian Hardie began playing more original progressive rock material. They became Australia's first symphonic rock group and released their debut album, Four Moments in August 1975. The album, produced by former member, Jon English, peaked at No. 13 on the Kent Music Report Albums Chart. "Rosanna", written by Millo, appeared on the related Singles Chart. The band released a second album, Windchase in February 1976 which had less chart success, the group split in June. After a court case over use of the name Sebastian Hardie, Millo's new group was called Windchase with Pilt joined by Bligh (ex-The Cheks) on drums and Doug Nethercote on bass guitar. Windchase released Symphinity, in June 1977, which had a heavier jazz-fusion sound but did not chart. The group disbanded in October and Millo began his solo career.

Millo and English worked on the soundtrack for the 1978 TV series Against the Wind – English also had a starring role in the period drama. The album reached No. 10 and its associated single "Six Ribbons" peaked at No. 5. Against the Wind was screened in the United Kingdom and through Scandinavia, where it was translated as Mot alla vindar (1980). Both the album, its title track and "Six Ribbons" peaked at No. 1 on the Norwegian albums and singles charts respectively. "Six Ribbons" and the album, peaked at No. 4 on the Swedish charts. Millo and English toured Scandinavia in 1980 using English's backing band, Baxter Funt.

Millo recorded the track, "Rebecca" for the various artists' Australian Guitar Album released in 1979, it was issued as a shared single with Harvey James' "Let It Go". Millo's debut solo album Epic III appeared in November on Polydor Records, he engineered and produced the album using Jackie Orszaczky on bass guitar and Mark Kennedy on drums. "Life in Our Hands" had been issued as a single in August but neither album nor single had any chart success. Millo followed with his second solo album, Human Games in March 1983. His third solo album, Oceans of the Mind, was released in 2002. Millo provided electric and acoustic guitars, mandolin, lead vocals and Hammond organ; he wrote all the tracks and produced the album for Red Moon Music. His band members were Jeff Camilleri on bass guitar and backing vocals and Robbie Siracusa on drums and percussion. Guest musicians were David Hirschfelder on Nord synthesiser and Dave Wilkins and Jess Millo on backing vocals.

In 1984, Millo released the original soundtrack for World Safari II: The Final Adventure, a film documentary by Alby Mangels. He followed with the soundtrack of television mini-series, A Fortunate Life in 1986. Millo developed a successful career in television and film soundtrack composition and production, winning six industry awards for work in The Lighthorsemen (1987), G.P. (1989), Brides of Christ (1991, two awards), See How They Run (1999) and Changi (2001). Brides of Christ won an Australian Record Industry Association (ARIA) Music Award in 1992 for 'Best Original Soundtrack Album' - Millo was nominated for the same award in 1997 for G.P. and in 2002 for Changi.

In 1994, Millo, Pilt and the Plavsic brothers briefly reformed Sebastian Hardie to perform at a progressive rock festival, ProgFest, in Los Angeles, which was recorded and eventually released as Sebastian Hardie – Live in L.A. in 1997. They played material from Four Moments, Windchase, Symphinity, and Epic III. Another reunion occurred in 2003 when supporting the British art rock band, Yes on their Australian tour.

== Awards and nominations ==
=== AFI Awards ===
The annual AFI Awards are presented by the Australian Film Institute.

Year	Nominee / work	Award	Result
1988	The Lighthorsemen	Best Original Music Score	Won

=== AGSC Awards ===
The annual AGSC Awards are presented by the Australian Guild of Screen Composers.

Year	Nominee / work	Award	Result
1999	See How They Run	Best Original Music in a Children's TV or Animation Series	Won

=== APRA-AGSC Awards ===
The annual Screen Music Awards are presented by Australasian Performing Right Association (APRA) and Australian Guild of Screen Composers (AGSC) for television and film scores and soundtracks.

Year	Nominee / work	Award	Result
1992	Brides of Christ	Best Film Score	Won
1992	Brides of Christ	Best Television Theme	Won
1996	G. P.	Best Television Theme	Won
2002	Changi	Best Music for a Mini-Series or Telemovie	Won

=== ARIA Music Awards ===
The ARIA Music Awards is an annual awards ceremony that recognises excellence, innovation, and achievement across all genres of Australian music. They commenced in 1987.

Year	Nominee / work	Award	Result	Ref.
1988	The Lighthorsemen	Best Original Soundtrack, Cast or Show Album	Nominated	
1992	Brides of Christ	Best Original Soundtrack, Cast or Show Album	Won	
1997	G.P.	Best Original Soundtrack, Cast or Show Album	Nominated	
2002	Changi	Best Original Soundtrack, Cast or Show Album	Nominated	

== Discography ==
=== Studio albums ===
- Epic III – (November 1979 Polydor Records)
- Human Games – (March 1983, EMI / Wheatley)
- Oceans of the Mind – (2002, Red Moon Music)

=== Soundtrack albums ===
- World Safari II – (1984, Powderworks Records / BMG)
- A Fortunate Life – (1986, Polydor Records)
