= Calm Before the Storm (Jon English album) =

Studio album by Jon English
- Released: April 1980
- Genre: Pop rock
- Label: Mercury
- Producers: Bruce Brown, Russell Dunlop

Jon English chronology
| English History (1979) | Calm Before the Storm (1980) | In Roads (1981) |

Singles from Calm Before the Storm
- 1. "Hot Town" Released: October 1979; 2. "Carmilla" Released: March 1980; 3. "Hold Back The Night" Released: January 1981

Calm Before the Storm is the sixth studio album by the Australian musician Jon English, and his first under the Mercury Records label. The album was released in Australia in April 1980 and peaked at number 17 on the Kent Music Report in March 1983.

Two singles were released from the album: "Hot Town", which peaked at No. 11 on the Kent Music chart, and "Carmilla", which peaked at No. 27.

The international version had a slightly altered track-listing and included the track "Hold Back the Night", which was released as a single in 1981.

== Track listing ==
Vinyl/ Cassette (6357 067)

Side One

1. "Survivor" (English) - 3:31
2. "Save Me" (Garry Paige, Mark Punch) - 3:15
3. "Carmilla" (English) - 3:47
4. "Down in Frisco" (Mike Wade) - 3:12
5. "Hot Town" (Graeme Connors, Wade) - 3:43

Side Two

1. "Little By Little" (Tony Naylor) - 4:22
2. "Feel Like Dancing" (Wade, Naylor) - 3:22
3. "Sad News" (Wade) - 3:34
4. "Split" (Naylor) - 3:41
5. "Hope it Turns Out Right" (Connors, Wade) - 4:23

== Charts ==
| Chart (1980–83) | Peak position |
|---|---|
| Australian Albums (Kent Music Report) | 17 |
| New Zealand Albums (RMNZ) | 9 |
| Norwegian Albums (VG-lista) | 6 |

== Certifications ==
| Region | Certification | Certified units/sales |
|---|---|---|
| New Zealand (RMNZ) | Gold | 7,500^{^} |
^{^} Shipments figures based on certification alone.
