= Against the Wind (soundtrack) =

Soundtrack album by Jon English and Mario Millo
- Released: 1978
- Recorded: Windchase Sound, Albert Studios
- Genres: Classical; folk; world; stage and screen; R&B
- Length: 43:54
- Labels: Polydor, Frituna
- Producers: Jon English and Mario Millo

Jon English albums chronology
Words Are Not Enough (1978)	Against the Wind (1978)	English History (1979)

Singles from Against the Wind
- 1. "Six Ribbons" Released: 1978

Against the Wind is a soundtrack album for the Australian television miniseries Against the Wind (1978). The album was credited to Jon English and Mario Millo and released in Australia and New Zealand in 1978 and in Scandinavia in 1981.

The album was certified 2xGold in Australia.

== Track listing ==
Side One
No.	Title	Writer(s)	Length
1.	"Against The Wind"	Jon English	2:32
2.	"Seeds Of Fire"	Jon English, Mario Millo	5:59
3.	"Unfinished Theme"	Mario Millo	3:01
4.	"Six Ribbons"	Jon English	2:04
5.	"Mary's Theme"	Mario Millo	4:00
6.	"The March Of The Kings Of Laois"	Traditional	3:51

Side Two
No.	Title	Writer(s)	Length
1.	"Waltz Theme"	Mario Millo	5:21
2.	"Six Ribbons"	Jon English, Mario Millo	3:11
3.	"Danny And Ngilgi"	Jon English, Mario Millo	2:12
4.	"Main Theme Major"	Jon English	3:17
5.	"Death Or Liberty"	Jon English, Mario Millo	8:26

== Charts ==
Chart (1978–1981)	Peak position
Australian Kent Music Report	10
New Zealand Albums (RMNZ)	4
Norwegian VG-lista Albums Chart	1
Swedish Albums Chart	4
