= Hollywood Seven (album) =

Studio album by Jon English
- Released: August 1976
- Genres: Pop rock; funk; soul
- Label: Polydor
- Producers: Richard Lush, Jon English, Rod Thomas, William Mottling, G. Wayne Thomas

Jon English chronology
It's All a Game (1974)	Hollywood Seven (1976)	Minutes to Midnight (1977)

Singles from Hollywood Seven
- 1. "Lovin' Arms" Released: June 1975; 2. "Hollywood Seven" Released: April 1976; 3. "I'm a Survivor" Released: 1976

Hollywood Seven is the third studio album by Australian musician Jon English. The album was released in Australia in August 1976. Three singles were released from the album, including "Hollywood Seven", which peaked at number 13 on the Kent Music chart and number 18 in Sweden.

== Track listing ==
Vinyl/ Cassette (2907 027)

Side One

1. "Hollywood Seven" (Gloria Sklerov, Harry Lloyd) - 4:46
2. "Walk Across the World" (Jon English) - 3:33
3. "Laughing at the Guru" (English) - 4:45
4. "Money Is" (Quincy Jones) - 4:00
5. "I'm a Survivor" (Barry Mann, Cynthia Weil) - 3:30

Side Two

1. "Play with Fire" (Nanker Phelge) - 5:22
2. "If You Think You're Groovy" (Steve Marriott, Ronnie Lane) - 4:31
3. "Sand Castles" (English) - 3:06
4. "Lovin' Arms" (Tom Jans)- 3:02
5. "The Miracle" (English) - 6:24

== Weekly charts ==
Chart (1976)	Peak position
Australian Kent Music Report Albums Chart	20
