= Some People (Jon English album) =

Some People...

Studio album by Jon English
- Released: September 1983
- Genre: Pop rock
- Labels: Midnight, Frituna
- Producer: David Mackay

Jon English chronology
Jokers and Queens (1982)	Some People... (1983)	Modern English: 16 Great Hits (1983)

Singles from Some People...
- 1. "Some People (Have All The Fun)" Released: July 1983; 2. "Tempted" Released: October 1983; 3. "Waterloo" Released: November 1983

Some People... is the ninth studio album by Australian musician, Jon English. The album was released in Australia in September 1983. Three singles were released from the album. The album peaked at number 35 on the Australian Kent Report.

The songs "Straight Ahead," "Hell or High Water" and "Oh, Paris" would later be reworked and included in English's rock opera, Paris.

== Track listing ==
Vinyl/cassette (6357 067)

Side One

1. "Straight Ahead" (John Dallimore, Roger Dallimore, Jon English) - 5:15
2. "Some People (Have All The Fun)" (J.Dallimore, English) - 3:51
3. "Hell or High Water" (English, Glenn Henson) - 4:56
4. "Coming Up" (English, Keith Kerwin) - 3:01
5. "Waterloo" (J.Dallimore, English) - 4:40

Side Two

1. "Oh, Paris" (John Coker, English) - 3:40
2. "Tempted" (Max Merritt, Larry Murray) - 3:00
3. "I'm Yours" (John Beaton) - 3:09
4. "She Was Real" (English) - 7:10
5. "Given Time" (Kerwin) - 3:46

== Weekly charts ==
Chart (1983)	Peak position
Australian Albums (Kent Music Report)	35
Norwegian Albums (VG-lista)	36
