= In Roads =

Studio album by Jon English
- Released: 1981
- Genre: Pop; rock
- Label: Mercury
- Producer: Tim Friese-Greene

Jon English chronology
Calm Before the Storm (1980)	In Roads (1981)	Beating the Boards (1982)

Singles from In Roads
- 1. "Straight from the Heart" Released: June 1981; 2. "The Shining" Released: September 1981; 3. "Josephine (Too Many Secrets)" Released: May 1982 (Scandinavia only)

In Roads is the seventh studio album by Australian musician Jon English. The album was released in Australia in 1981. Three singles were released from the album, including "Josephine (Too Many Secrets)" which peaked at number 9 in Norway.

== Track listing ==
Vinyl/cassette (6357 067):

Side One

1. "Been in Love Before" (Jon English) - 4:10
2. "Blame It on the Night" (Dennis La Rue, Rick Blakemore) - 3:19
3. "Straight from the Heart" (Bryan Adams) - 2:58
4. "You Might Need Somebody" (Nan O'Byrne, Tom Snow) - 3:35
5. "The Shining" (Greg Henson, English) - 4:14

Side Two

1. "Touch and Go" (English) - 3:26
2. "Stranger in a Strange Land" (La Rue, R. Blakemore) - 3:41
3. "Move Better in the Night" (Chris Thompson, Robbie McIntosh, Stevie Lange) - 4:49
4. "Hope It Turns Out Right" (Mike Wade, Graeme Connors) - 3:54
5. "Last Night in Hollywood" (Wade, Connors) - 3:54
6. "Josephine (Too Many Secrets)" (Tim Friese-Greene, English) - 3:58

== Weekly charts ==
Chart (1981–82)	Peak position
Australian Albums (Kent Music Report)	58
Norwegian Albums (VG-lista)	4
Swedish Albums (Sverigetopplistan)	24
