= It's All a Game =

Studio album by Jon English
- Released: November 1974
- Recorded: Studios 301, Sydney
- Genre: pop; rock
- Label: Warm & Genuine
- Producer: Jon English

Jon English chronology
Wine Dark Sea (1973)	It's All a Game (1974)	Hollywood Seven (1976)

Singles from It's All a Game
- 1. "Turn the Page" Released: 1974

It's All a Game is the second studio album by Australian musician Jon English. The album was released in Australia November 1974.

The album produced English's first top twenty single, a cover of Bob Seger's "Turn the Page", which entered the Kent Music chart in February 1975. The song peaked at number 7 in New Zealand.

== Track listing ==
Vinyl/ Cassette (2907 902)

Side One

1. "Turn the Page" (Bob Seger) - 4:28
2. "Just the Way I Am" (Jon English) - 3:25
3. "He Could Have Been a Dancer" (English) - 5:06
4. "Love Goes On" (English) - 2:25
5. "By Firelight" (English) - 2:38
6. "Space Shanty" (English) - 3:26

Side Two

1. "Snakeyes" (English) - 5:43
2. "Chained to the Middle" (English) - 5:45
3. "Superstar (You Promised Me)" (English) - 4:50
4. "Hail All Hail to the Revolution (12 Bore)" (English) - 4:36

== Weekly charts ==
Chart (1974)	Peak position
Australian Kent Music Report Albums Chart	47
