= Against the Wind (miniseries) =

Australian television miniseries

- DVD cover
- Written by: Bronwyn Binns; Ian Jones; Peter Kinlock; Tony Morphett; Paul Davies; Cliff Green.
- Directed by: George T. Miller; Simon Wincer
- Starring: Mary Larkin; Jon English
- Country of origin: Australia
- No. of episodes: 13

Production
- Producers: Bronwyn Binns; Ian Jones; Henry Crawford.
- Running time: 50 minutes
- Production companies: Seven Network; Pegasus Productions

Original release
- Network: Seven Network
- Release: 12 September – 31 October 1978

Against the Wind is a 1978 Australian television miniseries. It is a historical drama portraying both the British rule of Ireland, and the development of New South Wales and Australia.

Jon English won the Logie Award in 1979 for "Best New Talent" for his role in the miniseries as "Jonathan Garrett". It was the first major Australian TV production to be broadcast in the United States.

A soundtrack was also released, topping the charts in Norway and reaching the top 10 in Australia and Sweden.

== Plot ==
Set during Australia's colonial era over the period 1798–1812, the series follows the life of Mary Mulvane, a daughter of an Irish school master. At 18, she is transported to New South Wales for a term of seven years after attempting to take back her family's milk cow which had been seized by the British "in lieu of tithes" to the local proctor. She endures the trial of a convict sea journey to New South Wales and years of service as a convict before her emancipation and life as a free citizen. During the journey out she makes a lifelong friend of fellow Irish convict, Polly, and in the course of the series we see their friendship continue, Polly's relationship and life with taverner Will Price develop, and Mary's relationship with Jonathan Garrett grows, leading to eventual marriage when both have served their term. Together they face the difficulties of establishing a farm and a young family in the new country, and must deal with the tyranny of the corrupt military running the colony. It is based on factual events of the Garrett Family (as stated in every episode) and the last episode recites what became of the Garretts: they had 5 children and now have many descendants.

== Cast ==
Major cast members

- Mary Larkin as Mary Mulvane
- Kerry McGuire as Polly McNamara
- Warwick Sims as Maurice Greville (ep. 1–5, 8–13)
- Jon English as Jonathan Garrett (ep. 3–13)
- Frank Gallacher as Will Price (ep. 3–13)
- Fred Parslow as Charles Wiltshire (ep. 3–6, 11–13)
- Lynn Rainbow as Louisa Wiltshire (ep. 3–6, 9, 13)
- Julia Blake as Cook (ep. 3–6, 13)
- Charles Gilroy as Amos (ep. 4, 10–13)
- Gerard Kennedy as Dinny O'Byrne (ep. 4–10)
- Hu Price as Jonas Pike (ep. 4–5, 7, 9, 11–12)

Supporting cast members

- Peter Gwynne as Francis Mulvane (ep. 1–2)
- Roz de Winter as Mrs. Mulvane (ep. 1–2)
- Anna Griffin as Elly Mulvane (ep. 1–2)
- Bill Saly as Seamus Mulvane (ep. 1–2)
- Bryan Brown as Michael Connor (ep. 1–2)
- Jennifer Claire as Mrs. Connor (ep. 1–2)
- Frank Thring as Magistrate (ep. 1–2)
- John Nash as Landlord Buchanan (ep. 1–2)
- Wallas Eaton as Tithe Proctor (ep. 1–2)
- John Allen as Redcoat Officer (ep. 1–2)
- Jerry Thomas as Sergeant (ep. 1–2)
- Dave Evans as Watchman (ep. 1–2)
- John Ley as Sean (ep. 1–2)
- Cliff Ellen as Warder (ep. 1–2)
- Carlos Keena as Lookout Boy (ep. 1–2)
- Tim Eliott as Captain Dennott (ep. 1–3)
- Adrian Wright as Lieutenant Burne (ep. 1–3)
- Ernie Bourne as Surgeon Beyer (ep. 1–3)
- Stewart Faichney as Ricketts (ep. 1–3)
- Norman Hodges as Sentry Bates (ep. 1–3)
- Lulu Pinkus as Jenny (ep. 1–2)
- Hamish Hughes as Brannon (ep. 1–2)
- Frank Hamilton as Egan (ep. 1–2)
- Michael Carmon & Cash Backman as Redcoats (ep. 1–2)
- Jane Clifton & Christine Calcutt as Convict Women (ep. 1–2)
- Anthony Hawkins as Surgeon Balmain (ep. 3)
- Walter Pym as Judge Advocate (ep. 3)
- Marion Edward as Matron Purdy (ep. 3)
- David John as Pantryman (ep. 3)
- David Ravenswood as Samuel Marsden (ep. 4, 6)
- Tommy Dysart as Travers (ep. 4), Drunken Rebel (ep. 8) & Settler (ep. 13)
- Edward Hyde (ep. 5) & Jeremy Shadlow (ep. 6) as Edward Wiltshire
- Atalanta Hyde (ep. 5) & Sarah Lambert (ep. 6) as Elizabeth Wiltshire
- Sean Scully (ep. 5) and Rod Mullinar (ep. 11–12) as John Macarthur
- Peter Cummins as Isaac Nichols (ep. 5)
- Howard Eyenon as Redcoat Corporal (ep. 5)
- Terry Gill (ep. 5–8), Patrick Edgeworth (ep. 7–8) & Rob Harrison (ep. 9) as Redcoat Sergeants
- Roger Oakley as Father Dixon (ep. 6–8)
- Neil McColl as Mick (ep. 6)
- Gillian O'Flynn as Baby's Mother (ep. 6)
- Tom Broadbridge as Baby's Father (ep. 6) & Soldier (ep. 10)
- Shelley Aldridge as Baby (ep. 6)
- Louis McManus as Fiddler (ep. 6)
- Don Barker as Captain Abbott (ep. 7–8, 12–13)
- Jim Norton as Cunningham (ep. 7–8)
- David Cameron as Liam Johnston (ep. 7–8)
- Tim Robertson as 'General' Holt (ep. 7–8)
- Chris Haywood as John Leary (ep. 7)
- Syd Conabere as Paymaster Cox (ep. 7–8)
- Harry Hayden as Reverend Hassall (ep. 7)
- Brendan Cassidy as Convict Overseer (ep. 7)
- Don Barkham as Major Johnston (ep. 8, 12)
- Vincent Gil as Quartermaster Laycock (ep. 8)
- Nick Waters as Trooper Andlesack (ep. 8) & Dragoon (ep. 10)
- Hugh Munro as Joshua Holt (ep. 8)
- John Cousins as Prosperous Settler (ep. 8)
- Marcel Cugola as French Settler (ep. 8)
- Jonathan Hardy as Sam Fitchett (ep. 9)
- Justine Saunders as Ngilgi (ep. 10)
- John Stanton as Surgeon (ep. 10)
- Jerry Thomas as Sergeant (ep. 10)
- Ken Weaver as Blacksmith (ep. 10)
- Roy Edmunds as Dragoon (ep. 10)
- Neil Thompson as Farm Commandant (ep. 11)
- David John as Traveller (ep. 11)
- Keith Kay as Labourer (ep. 11)
- George Dixon as Steward (ep. 11)
- Damon Pascoe as Dinny Garrett (ep. 12–13)
- Rob Harrison as Constable (ep. 12)
- Peter Felmingham as Sgt. Maj. Whittle (ep. 12)
- Frankie Hamilton as Trader (ep. 12)
- Vincent Ball as Governor Macquarie (ep. 13)
- Anne Lambert as Miss Stoddart (ep. 13)
- Malcolm Phillips as Judge Advocate (ep. 13)
- Jim Danton & Vernon Weaver as Thieves (ep. 13)
- Alex Porteous as Traveller (ep. 13)

== Episodes ==
No.	Date Aired	Episode Name	Directed by	Written by
1	12 September 12 1978	The Seeds of Fire	Simon Wincer	Ian Jones & Bronwyn Binns
2	12 September 12 1978	The Wild Geese	Simon Wincer	Ian Jones & Bronwyn Binns
3	19 September 1978	A Question of Guilt	Simon Wincer	Ian Jones & Bronwyn Binns
4	19 September 1978	The Flogging Parson	George T. Miller	Peter Kinloch
5	3 October 1978	An Agreement Between Officers and Others	Simon Wincer	Peter Kinloch
6	3 October 1978	A House on the Hill	George T. Miller	Tony Morphett
7	10 October 1978	The Tree of Liberty	Simon Wincer	Paul Davies
8	10 October 1978	When Kings Go Forth to Battle	George T. Miller	Ian Jones & Bronwyn Binns
9	17 October 1978	The Farmer's Friend	George T. Miller	Cliff Green
10	17 October 1978	A Matter of Life and Death	Simon Wincer	Tony Morphett
11	24 October 1978	The Spirit of Enterprise	George T. Miller	Cliff Green
12	24 October 1978	The Whip Hand	George T. Miller	Tony Hegarty
13	31 October 1978	The Windfall Summer	George T. Miller	Ian Jones & Bronwyn Binns

== Production ==
The series was the idea of Bronwyn Binns (née Fackerell), who grew up in President Road, Kellyville, New South Wales, where she found old convict remnants on the family land. Kellyville is not far from the site of the colonial Vinegar Hill uprising also known as the Castle Hill convict rebellion. Bronwyn worked as a researcher at Crawford Productions and developed the project over a number of months, She teamed up with Crawford's colleague Ian Jones and presented it to Channel Seven, who agreed to finance a series.

The series was filmed at Old Sydney Town (near Gosford), and at Belgrave Heights, Warrandyte, Colac, Geelong and Emu Bottom. It had a budget of over a million dollars and was the first Australian mini series.

== Broadcast ==
Mini-series were broadcast in the United States by the Metromedia television stations (WNEW, KTTV, WTTG, KRIV, WXIX) in 1979.

== Reception ==
The series was a large ratings success, being the second most popular show on Australia that year, being seen by 2,174,000 people in four cities. The series got a 45% viewing share.

It ushered in the cycle of Australian mini series.

It was also broadcast and very popular in Czechoslovakia under the name Proti větru (Against the Wind) with dubbing in Czech. The series was broadcast in Iran as well, where it was dubbed in Persian with the title "Dar barabar-e bad" (در برابر باد) (Against the Wind) and became very popular.

== Music ==
A soundtrack was released by Polydor Records. "Six Ribbons" was released as a single, peaking at number one on the Norwegian charts in 1981.

== Other media ==
The complete series is now available on DVD in Australia, Norway, Finland, Sweden and the Netherlands in PAL format. It is also available in North American format.

Episodes 1, 8, and 13 were published in book form in 1978.

== Bibliography ==
- "The Dictionary of Performing Arts in Australia — Theatre . Film . Radio . Television — Volume 1" — Ann Atkinson, Linsay Knight, Margaret McPhee — Allen & Unwin Pty. Ltd., 1996
- "The Australian Film and Television Companion" — compiled by Tony Harrison — Simon & Schuster Australia, 1994
