= Paris (Jon English musical) =

Rock musical written by Jon English and David Mackay

Paris is a rock musical written by Australian rock musician Jon English and David Mackay between 1987 and 1990, based on the myth of the Trojan War. Mostly on the story of the Iliad A concept album was released in Australia in 1990 with the first stage production taking place in Sydney in 2003.

According to English, the concept for the musical began in a 1982 prank: he wrote a song called "Oh Paris", about the mythic hero rather than the French capital, just to see how many people actually listened to the words. The musical focuses on the love story between Helen and Paris as it follows his participation in the Trojan War. Paris is about the struggle to maintain some balance between passion and order, law and chaos, head and heart.

== Concept album ==
Paris

Cast recording by Original Australian Cast
- Released: 1990
- Recorded: 1987–1990
- Genre: Rock
- Label: WEA
- Producer: David Mackay

In 1987 Jon English took on the role of Grigory Rasputin in the stage musical of the same name. This production, although controversial at the time, served to fire Jon's ambition to write his own show based on the Trojan War. English travelled to England to again work with David Mackay who had produced his album Some People... (1983).

For three years, English and Mackay worked on the musical, with English stopping to star in the Sydney production of the musical Big River in 1988 and to release his studio album, The Busker (1990).

The musical was preceded in 1990 by a 2-CD concept album, called Paris: A Love Story, recorded in London. English sang the role of Hector, and the cast included John Parr as Paris, Sheila Parker as Helen, Terence Donovan as Priam, Sheryl Parker as Cassandra, Doc Neeson as Achilles, John Waters as Agamemnon, Philip Quast as Patroclus, Joe Fagin as Menelaus, Harry Nilsson as Ulysses, as well as Demis Roussos, David Atkins and Barry Humphries, backed by the London Symphony Orchestra and London Philharmonic Choir.

At the ARIA Music Awards of 1991, the album was nominated for two ARIA Awards, winning Best Original Soundtrack, Cast or Show Album. It was also nominated for Best Adult Contemporary Album.

=== Track listing ===
CD1

1. "Overture" – 2:31
2. "Prelude" (formerly "Chorale") – 5:38
3. "A Head Without a Heart" – 3:01
4. "Straight Ahead" – 2:56
5. "What Could Go Wrong" – 3:45
6. "Perfect Stranger" – 6:47
7. "A Long Time Coming" – 3:35
8. "Business" – 5:13
9. "The Leader" – 3:41
10. "Paris in Court" – 5:50
11. "Any Fool Could See" – 5:17
12. "Thief in the Night" – 2:47
13. "Thoughts of Love" – 2:20
14. "Trust in Your Heart" – 1:31
15. "Welcome Home" – 6:25
16. "Hell or High Water" – 6:06

CD2

1. "No Turning Back" – 3:55
2. "For Better or Worse" – 3:28
3. "Ten Years On" – 3:17
4. "The Greek Camp" – 4:12
5. "What Price a Friend" – 3:01
6. "Love Has Power" – 3:10
7. "Two Titans" – 5:09
8. "The Beggar" – 1:56
9. "Ulysses Prayer" – 5:44
10. "A Horse With No Rider" – 1:14
11. "Inside Outside" – 4:09
12. "The Balance Shifts" – 6:22
13. "Oh Paris" – 3:50
14. "Finale" – 9:23

== Musical ==
Paris
- Music: Jon English and David Mackay
- Lyrics: Jon English and David Mackay
- Book: Jon English and David Mackay
- Basis: Trojan War mythology
- Productions: 2003 – Sydney; Gosford; 2004 – Melbourne; 2005 – Auckland; 2008 – Adelaide; Gosford; 2009 – Brisbane

After a decade of lobbying for a professional stage production, English released the amateur rights to the musical. It was first performed in October 2003 by both the Regals Musical Society in Sydney and the Laycock Street Theatre in Gosford. English appeared as the Fisherman in one performance of the Gosford production. The Melbourne premiere was on 29 January 2004 at the National Theatre, with further amateur productions in Auckland in 2005 and Adelaide in 2008. In April 2008, a re-worked version was performed at Laycock Street Theatre with new orchestrations and several new songs by Central Coast musician Andrew Swan and a re-vamped script edited by director Stuart Smith. In this production, English appeared as Menelaus. School groups and other amateur theatre companies have also performed the musical in the years since. Music Theatre Melbourne produced a concert version in July 2017 at the Melbourne Recital Centre.

== Characters ==
- Homer – The narrator

Trojans

- Paris – Prince of Troy
- Priam – The King of Troy; father of Hector, Paris and Cassandra
- Hecuba – The wife of Priam
- Hector – Heroic commander of the Trojan army, prince of Troy.
- Cassandra – Princess of Troy and a prophetess
- Aeneas – Prince of Dardania, cousin to the Trojan royalty, second in command to Hector.
- Laocoen – High Priest of Troy; the only one who listens to Cassandra.
- Andromache – Wife of Hector

Greeks

- Helen – The wife of Menelaus and Queen of Sparta
- Agamemnon – Brother of Menelaus; King of Mycenae and leader of all Greek forces.
- Menelaus – The King of Sparta and husband of Helen.
- Achilles – The best of the greek army, leader of the myrmidons.
- Patroclus – Companion/Lover of Achilles, warrior.
- Ulysses – The intelligent and cunning King of Ithaca.
- Sinon – An inept Greek soldier
- Ajax and Diomedes – Greek warlords
- Andruste – Helen's handmaiden and closest friend
- Fisherman – An old friend of Helen's
- Thersites and Talthybius – Sinon's inept friends

Ensemble

- Greeks – Greek ensemble
- Trojans – Trojan ensemble

== Synopsis ==
Act I

Paris gave a gift to the goddess Aphrodite in order to be with her. King Priam of Troy prays for guidance from the goddesses Aphrodite and Athena. Cassandra and Laocoen lament over the poor decision that Priam is about to make. She tries to warn her father ("Head Without a Heart"). Priam ignores her and sends Paris to the Greek province of Sparta as an emissary to foster goodwill ("What Could Go Wrong?"). Paris and Aeneas sail to Sparta, but the boat is wrecked in a storm and Paris falls overboard. Helen, the wife of King Menalaus of Sparta, finds Paris washed up on shore and nurses him ("Perfect Stranger"). He mistakes her for Aphrodite, falling in love at first sight. Helen wishes she could leave her life behind. Paris stumbles upon Sinon, Thersites and Talbythius, who escort him to the palace to meet the Greek kings.

Agamemnon and Menelaus try to convince the other Greek kings to invade Troy, but to no avail. ("Business") Achilles barges in on the meeting and asks how Agamemnon thought it would be possible to take Troy without him leading the army. ("The Leader") When Paris arrives, the Greek nobles are fighting about business. They make fun of their bedraggled visitor, and Agamemnon thinks up a plan to exploit the Trojan prince for information. ("Paris in Court") Helen tries to convince Paris that he has fallen into a trap, but ends up falling in love with him, and they escape together. ("Any Fool Could See") They discuss that they can never be together, as they both have duties to their people. However, a guard finds them and tries to kill Paris, but Helen saves his life by stabbing the guard in the back. Helen's old friend, the fisherman, tells them to escape. When Agamemnon appears, he kills both the fisherman and Helen's handmaiden, framing Paris for the crime.

Menelaus reflects on his love for Helen. ("A Thief In The Night") He will never rest until he has her back. This convinces the other kings to follow him and attack Troy. Paris sings to Helen about how fate has brought them together ("Trust in Your Heart"). Paris and Helen arrive at Troy, facing the judgement of his entire family for provoking the Greek kings and potentially starting a war. Paris stands up to his father, telling him that he will be with Helen, "Come Hell or High Water". This sparks a bad reaction in the crowd, who start hurling insults at the two lovers, and not even the rebuttal of Paris' older brother, the heroic Hector, can stop their anger. A war is imminent.

Act II

On the ramparts in Troy, Hector rallies the Trojan army, leading them into battle against the invading Greeks ("No Turning Back"). Paris and Helen sing about their love and commitment as a ten-year war begins, and countless soldiers die around them ("For Better or For Worse").

Achilles confronts Agamemnon about his selfish attitude and how he claims all the spoils of war for himself. ("The Greek Camp"). He throws down his armour, saying that he won't continue to fight for Agamemnon. The Trojans launch an assault on the Greek camp, and with Achilles gone it seems all of their hope is lost. Patroclus dons his friend's armour and leads the Greeks under the guise of their champion. Hector slays Patroclus, and Achilles laments the death of his only friend before challenging Hector to a duel. ("What Price A Friend")

Against the wishes of his entire family, Hector prepares to face Achilles, believing that he has a chance to end the war once and for all. ("Love Has Power") Hector bids farewell to his family and marches out to fight Achilles. Achilles and Hector engage in an epic duel. Hector is the better swordsman, but he cannot penetrate the armour of the greek warrior, who relies on brute force. Hector kicks Achilles in his one weak point, his heel, and drives him to the ground, where he frantically slashes at his foe, but is still unable to harm him. Desperately, Achilles, strikes up at Hector, impaling him. As Achilles ties the body of his fallen adversary to his chariot, Paris shoots an arrow at him from the walls of Troy, hitting him in the heel and killing him. ("Two Titans")

Paris mourns his deceased brother as the two leaders are carried off for their funerals. Ulysses, disguised as a beggar, confronts Helen, asking her if she knows any way to end the war. She has no answers for him. ("The Beggar") Ulysses prays to Athena, asking her for a way to end the war. He gets a response from the goddess and constructs the legendary Trojan Horse, realising that the only way out is a head without a heart. ("Ulysses Prayer") Agamemnon 'volunteers' Sinon as a stooge in order to convince the Trojans to bring the horse inside the city. ("A Horse With No Rider") Inside the horse, Sinon drunkenly explains Agamemnon's plan to Thersites and Talbythius. ("Inside Outside") The Trojans find the horse and Sinon, who convinces Priam to take it into the city. Cassandra laments that Paris should have known better, as Thersites and Talbythius sneak out of the horse and open the gates of Troy, letting the Greek army in. ("The Balance Shifts")

A rout ensues.("Oh, Paris") Paris and Aeneas try to gather up the royal family and escape the city, but find that Priam has already been murdered. They gather a small group of survivors and attempt to escape, but Menelaus finds them and shoots an arrow into Paris' back, still believing him to have abducted Helen against her will. However, as Paris dies in his lover's arms, Menalaus finally realises that Helen truly loved him and attempts to console her amidst the burning wreckage of Troy ("Finale").

== Musical numbers ==
As recorded in 1990, re-released in 2003 with new songs.

Act I

- "Overture" – Homer and Ensemble
- "Prelude" (formerly "Chorale") – Homer and Ensemble
- "Head without a Heart" – Cassandra and Laocoen
- "Straight Ahead" – Paris
- "What Could Go Wrong" – Paris and Aeneas
- "Perfect Stranger" – Helen and Paris
- "A Long Time Coming" – Helen
- "Far Too Many Kings"^{[b]} – Sinon, Thersites, Talthybius
- "Business" – Agamemnon, Menelaus, Ulysses, Patroclus and Ajax
- "The Leader" – Achilles
- "Paris in Court"^{[a]} – Paris, Agamemnon, Menelaus, Ulysses, Sinon, Thersites, Patroclus and Achilles
- "Any Fool Could See" – Helen, Paris, Menelaus and Agamemnon
- "The Cliffs" – Helen and Paris
- "A Thief In The Night" – Menelaus
- "Thoughts of Love"^{[a]} – Paris
- "Trust in Your Heart" – Paris
- "Welcome Home" – Ensemble
- "Hell or High Water" – Paris and Helen

Act II

- "No Turning Back" – Hector
- "For Better Or Worse" – Paris and Helen
- "Ten Years On" – Instrumental
- "The Greek Camp"^{[a]} – Achilles, Agamemnon, Ulysses, Patroclus and Menelaus
- "What Price A Friend"^{[a]} – Patroclus, Hector and Achilles
- "Battle Lines" – Hector
- "Love Has Power" – Hector
- "Two Titans" – Paris, Achilles and Ensemble
- "A Royal Trojan Son" – Paris
- "The Beggar" – Ulysses and Helen
- "Ulysses Prayer" – Ulysses
- "Horse With No Rider" – Ulysses and Agamemnon
- "Inside Outside" – Sinon, Thersites and Talthybius
- "The Balance Shifts" – Cassandra, Laocoen, Aeneas, Priam, Sinon, Trojan Ensemble
- "Oh Paris" – Helen and Ulysses
- "Finale" – Company

Notes

- ^{a} new to 2003 score.
- ^{b} new to 2008 score.

== See also ==
- Paris (1928 musical)
