= Words Are Not Enough (album) =

Studio album by Jon English
- Released: August 1978
- Studio: Albert Studios, Sydney
- Genre: Pop rock
- Length: 36:59
- Label: Polydor
- Producer: Bruce Brown, Russell Dunlop

Jon English chronology
| Minutes to Midnight (1977) | Words Are Not Enough (1978) | Against the Wind (1978) |

Singles from Words Are Not Enough
- 1. "Same Old Feeling Again" Released: January 1978; 2. "Words Are Not Enough" Released: May 1978; 3. "Nights in Paradise" Released: August 1978

Words Are Not Enough is the fifth studio album by Australian musician Jon English. The album was released in Australia in August 1978.

Three singles were released from the album, including "Words Are Not Enough", which peaked at number 6 on the Kent Music chart, becoming English's first top ten single.

== Track listing ==
Vinyl/ Cassette (2907 046)

Side One

1. "Give it a Try" (Bruce Brown, Russell Dunlop) - 2:56
2. "Words Are Not Enough" (Garry Paige, Mark Punch) - 3:37
3. "Free Ride" (Dan Hartman) - 2:43
4. "Nights in Paradise" (T.Moeller, C.Gibley) - 5:09
5. "Love is Alive" (G.Wright) - 3:57

Side Two

1. "Sail On" (Mark Punch) - 4:19
2. "A Love Like Yours" (Holland–Dozier–Holland) - 4:14
3. "Fantastic (Ain't What it Used to Be)" - 3:52
4. "Hot and Dirty in the City" - 3:22
5. "Same Old Feeling Again" - 3:03

== Weekly charts ==
| Chart (1978) | Peak position |
|---|---|
| Australian Kent Music Report Albums Chart | 28 |
