= Wine Dark Sea (Jon English album) =

Studio album by Jon English
- Released: March 1973
- Recorded: EMI Studios, United Sounds; Sydney
- Genre: Pop, rock
- Label: Warm & Genuine
- Producer: Michael Carlos

Jon English chronology
Wine Dark Sea (1973)	It's All a Game (1974)

Singles from Wine Dark Sea
- 1. "Handbags and Gladrags" Released: 1973; 2. "Close Every Door" Released: 1973

Alternative cover
- Rainbow Records repressing

Wine Dark Sea is the debut studio album by English-Australian musician Jon English. The album was released in Australia in March 1973.

== Track listing ==
Vinyl/ cassette (2907 006)

Side one

1. "Summer Long" (G. Wayne Thomas) - 4:36
2. "Sweet Lady Mary" (Ronnie Lane, Rod Stewart, Ronnie Wood) - 5:23
3. "Wine Dark Sea" (Jon English) - 3:29
4. "Horsehair and Plastic" (Jon English) - 2:39
5. "Close Every Door" (Andrew Lloyd Webber, Tim Rice) - 2:46
6. "Monopoly" (Thomas) - 3:54

Side two

1. "Handbags and Gladrags" (Mike d'Abo) - 5:54
2. "Prelude / Tomorrow" (Thomas/ English) - 4:19
3. "Brand New Day" (Al Kooper) - 5:28
4. "Share the End" (Carly Simon) - 4:58

== Weekly charts ==
Chart (1973)	Peak position
Australian Kent Music Report Albums Chart	50
