= Minutes to Midnight (Jon English album) =

Studio album by Jon English
- Released: 8 March 1977
- Genre: Pop rock
- Length: 41:46
- Label: Polydor
- Producer: Richard Lush

Jon English chronology
| Hollywood Seven (1976) | Minutes to Midnight (1977) | Words Are Not Enough (1978) |

Singles from Minutes to Midnight
- 1. "Behind Blue Eyes" Released: January 1977; 2. "Lay It All Down" Released: April 1977; 3. "Everytime I Sing a Love Song" Released: September 1977

Minutes to Midnight is the fourth studio album by Australian musician Jon English. The album was released in Australia in March 1977.

Three singles were released from the album, including "Lay it All Down", which peaked at number 46 on the Kent Music chart.

== Track listing ==
Vinyl/ Cassette (2907 031)

Side one

1. "Lay it all Down" (Barry Goldberg, Will Jennings) - 3:35
2. "Hey Moonshine" - 3:28
3. "Don't Let Me Be Misunderstood" (Gloria Caldwell, Sol Marcus, Bennie Benjamin) - 3:16
4. "Whole Lot More" - 3:38
5. "A Long Way to Go" (Barry Mann, Cynthia Weil) - 3:29
6. "Behind Blue Eyes" (Pete Townshend) - 4:55

Side two

1. "Everytime I Sing a Love Song" - 4:01
2. "Break Another Dawn" - 3:01
3. "Lady L" - 3:05
4. "Midnight Suite" (made up of "Crossword", "Minutes To Midnight" and "Comfortable") - 9:16

== Weekly charts ==
| Chart (1977) | Peak position |
|---|---|
| Australian Kent Music Report Albums Chart | 33 |
