= Josephine (Too Many Secrets) =

Single by Jon English

from the album In Roads
- B-side: "Straight from the Heart"
- Released: May 1982
- Recorded: Scorpio Studios, London
- Genre: Rock, pop rock
- Label: Frituna
- Songwriters: Jon English, Tim Friese-Greene
- Producer: Tim Friese-Greene

Jon English singles chronology
"The Shining" (1981)	"Josephine (Too Many Secrets)" (1982)	"Beating the Boards" (1982)

"Josephine (Too Many Secrets)" is a song by Australian musician Jon English. The song was released in Scandinavia only in 1982. The track was the third single from his seventh studio album, In Roads and peaked at number 9 in Norway in June 1982.

== Track listing ==
7" single (Frituna – FR-1114)

Side A

1. "Josephine (Too Many Secrets)" - 3:58

Side B

1. "Straight From The Heart" - 2:58

12" single (Frituna – FRDS-4)

Side A

1. "Josephine (Too Many Secrets)" - 3:58
2. "Move Better In The Night" - 4:49

Side B

1. "Been In Love Before" - 4:10
2. "You Might Need Somebody" - 3:35

== Charts ==
Chart (1982)	Position
Norway (VG-lista)	9
