= Get Your Love Right =

Single by Jon English

from the album English History
- A-side: "Get Your Love Right"
- B-side: "He Could've Been a Dancer"
- Released: May 1979
- Genre: Pop rock, soft rock
- Label: Polydor
- Songwriters: Alan David, Lionel Martin
- Producers: Brown and Dunlop

Jon English singles chronology
| "Six Ribbons" (1978) | "Get Your Love Right" (1979) | "Hot Town" (1979) |

"Get Your Love Right" is a song by Australian musician Jon English. The song was released in May 1979 as the first single from his first compilation album, English History.

== Track listing ==
Australian 7" Single (Mercury - 6037 121)

- Side A "Get Your Love Right"
- Side B "He Could Have Been a Dancer"

== Charts ==
| Chart (1979/81) | Peak position |
|---|---|
| Australian Kent Music Report | 27 |
| New Zealand (Recorded Music NZ) | 3 |
| Norway (VG-lista) | 4 |
| Sweden (Sverigetopplistan) | 20 |
