= Hot Town (Jon English song) =

- International cover for "Hot Town"

Single by Jon English

from the album Calm Before the Storm
- A-side: "Hot Town"
- B-side: "Show No Weakness"
- Released: October 1979
- Recorded: Albert Studios, Sydney
- Genre: Rock, classic rock
- Label: Mercury
- Songwriters: Graeme Connors, Mike Wade
- Producers: Brown and Dunlop

Jon English singles chronology
"Get Your Love Right" (1979)	"Hot Town" (1979)	"Carmilla" (1980)

"Hot Town" is a song by Australian musician Jon English. The song was released in October 1979 as the first single from his sixth studio album, Calm Before the Storm.

== Track listing ==
Australian 7" Single (Mercury – 6037 952)

- Side A "Hot Town"
- Side B "Show No Weakness"

International 7" Single (Mercury - 6038 002)

- Side A "Hot Town"
- Side B "Give It a Try"

== Charts ==
Chart (1979/80)	Peak position
Australian Kent Music Report	11
