= Jon English =

Australian singer and actor (1949–2016)

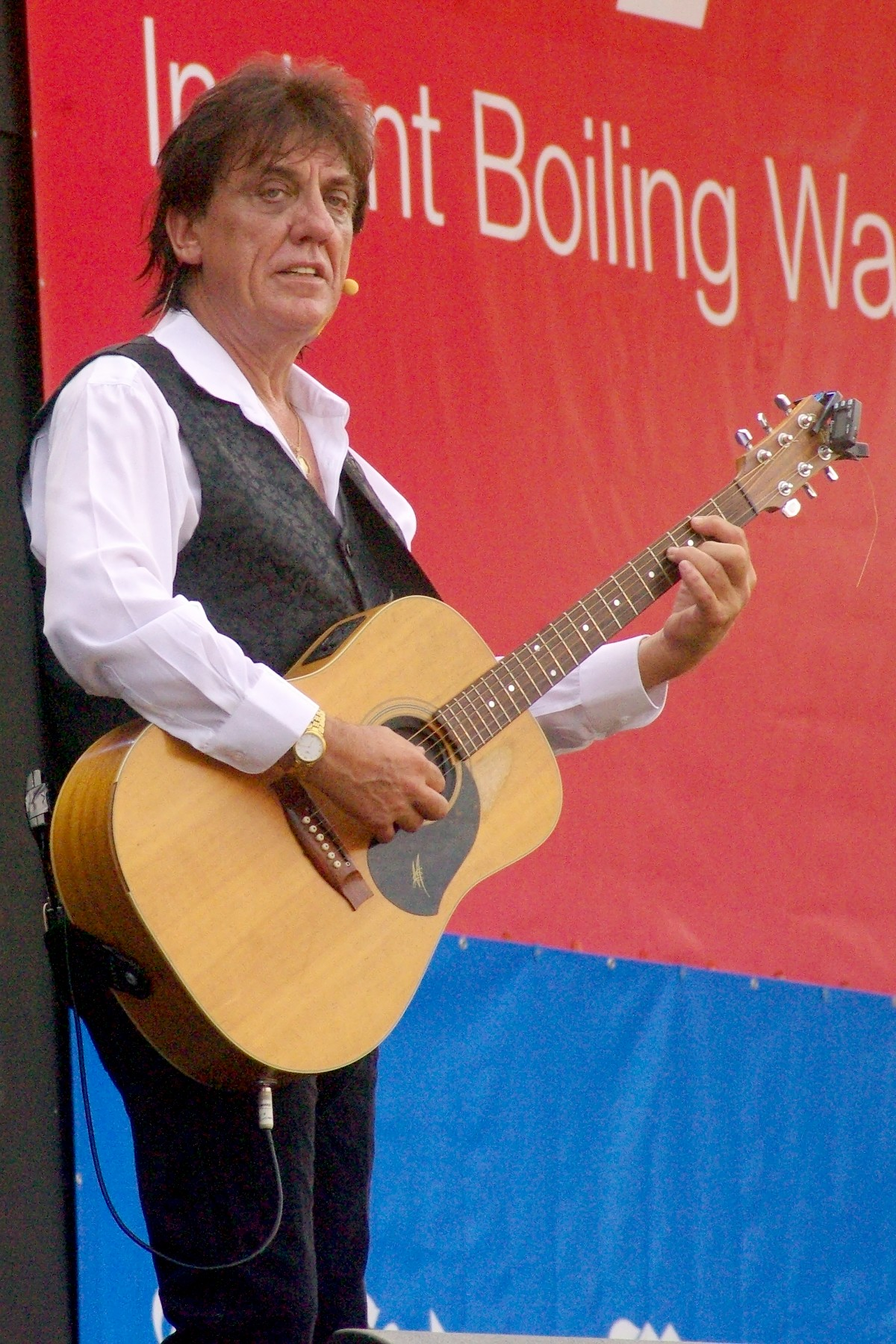
- English performing at Celebrate Australia! on Australia Day 2010
- Born: Jonathan James English; 26 March 1949; Hampstead, London, England
- Died: 9 March 2016 (aged 66); Newcastle, New South Wales, Australia
- Education: Cabramatta High School
- Occupations: Singer, actor, musician, songwriter
- Years active: 1965–2016
- Known for: Jesus Christ Superstar "Turn the Page"; Against the Wind "Six Ribbons"; The Pirates of Penzance
- Spouse: Carmen Sora (1969 til his death)
- Children: 4
- Website: www.jonenglish.com.au

Jonathan James English (26 March 1949 – 9 March 2016) was an English-born Australian singer, songwriter, musician and actor. He emigrated from England to Australia with his parents in 1961. He was an early vocalist and rhythm guitarist for Sebastian Hardie but left to take on the role of Judas Iscariot in the Australian version of the stage musical Jesus Christ Superstar from May 1972, which was broadcast on television. English was also a solo singer; his Australian top twenty hit singles include "Turn the Page", "Hollywood Seven", "Words are Not Enough", "Six Ribbons" and "Hot Town".

For his starring role in the 1978 Australian TV series Against the Wind he won the TV Week Logie Award for 'Best New Talent in Australia'. He also co-wrote and performed the score with Mario Millo (ex-Sebastian Hardie). The series had international release, known as Mot alla vindar (1980) in Swedish, where "Six Ribbons" was released as a single, both single and the soundtrack album peaked at No.1 on the Norwegian charts; the first single, "Six Ribbons" and the album, peaked at No.4 on the Swedish charts.

From 1983 to 1985, English won four Mo Awards with three consecutive 'Entertainer of the Year' awards and a further 'Male Vocal Performer' in 1985. English has performed in Gilbert and Sullivan's operettas The Pirates of Penzance, The Mikado and H.M.S. Pinafore from 1984. Performances of Essgee Entertainment's productions of the Gilbert and Sullivan trilogy from 1994 to 1997 were broadcast on Australian TV. They were all released on VHS and subsequently on DVD.

== Early life ==
Jonathan James English was born in 1949 in Hampstead, London, to Sydney and Sheila English, with siblings Janet, Jeremy and Jill. Sheila had worked as a hospital worker, teacher and ambulance driver; Sydney was working in air cargo for KLM and was moved to Sydney Airport. Sheila and the children followed, when the family emigrated to Australia in 1961 on RMS Orion with English turning 12 years old just before calling in at Fremantle.

Sydney had bought a house in Cabramatta, where Jon attended Cabramatta High School. Sydney was a self-taught piano player and dabbled with guitar and drums, he bought a guitar for the Jon English. Janet took her younger brother to the Sydney Stadium to see the Beatles perform during their 1964 Australian tour.

== Career ==
=== 1965–1972: First bands ===
English's first rock gig occurred when his neighbour's band needed a guitarist, he was about 16 and mid-performance was called upon to do vocals, he sang the Beatles' "Twist and Shout". His earliest known band was Zenith in 1965, formed at Cabramatta High School, and according to English "they were crap". Next was Gene Chandler & the Interns, which included guitarist Graham Ford, drummer Richard Lillico, bass guitarist Peter Plavsic and English as vocalist and rhythm guitarist. At the same time, he played Lock for the Parramatta Eels reserve grade team.

Ford founded Sebastian Hardie Blues Band in 1967 with Lillico and new band members. They played R&B and soul covers but disbanded by early 1968. When Ford reformed the band later in 1968, he recruited English and Peter Plavsic again, Anatole Kononewsky on keyboards and Peter's brother Alex Plavsic on drums. They had dropped the 'Blues Band' part to play more pop oriented music and were the backing band for legendary Australian rocker Johnny O'Keefe during 1969. Covering songs from the Rolling Stones, the Beatles, Bob Dylan, Otis Redding and Wilson Pickett they built a reputation in the Sydney pub scene.

Also attending Cabramatta High School, but one year lower was Carmen Sora; Sora and English married in September 1969 when she was 19 and he was 20. In January 1972, English left Sebastian Hardie when he won the role of Judas Iscariot in the Australian version of Jesus Christ Superstar from May 1972. Sebastian Hardie were later joined by Mario Millo on vocals and lead guitar and Toivo Pilt on keyboards. By 1974 they had become Australia's first symphonic rock band and released Four Moments in August 1975, which was produced by English.

=== 1972–1979: Actor and solo performer ===
Australian theatre producer Harry M. Miller and theatre director Jim Sharman had worked on the stage musical Hair and kept some of the cast and crew for their next project, the Australian version of Jesus Christ Superstar by Tim Rice/Andrew Lloyd Webber. Miller and Sharman chose English, from over 2,000 applicants, to take the starring role of Judas Iscariot alongside fellow stars Trevor White (ex-Sounds Unlimited) as Jesus Christ and Michele Fawdon as Mary Magdalene.

The initial run was from 4 May 1972, at Sydney's Capitol Theatre, to February 1974. With over 700 shows, it included other Australian music/theatre performers Reg Livermore (from Hair, later in The Rocky Horror Show), John Paul Young (later a solo singer with "Love is in the Air"), Marcia Hines (from Hair, took over as Mary Magdalene in 1973, later a solo singer with "You"), Doug Parkinson (Doug Parkinson in Focus had a hit with "Dear Prudence", took over from Livermore) and Stevie Wright (ex-the Easybeats, later a solo singer with "Evie").

Jesus Christ Superstar – Original Australian Cast Recording was released by MCA in 1972 with English and other cast members performing vocals for a studio recording. A documentary of the production was broadcast on national TV, it contained footage of performances and interviews with cast members. English reprised his role of Judas in the 1975 and 1978 productions. During 1974, English co-wrote, with Roy Ritchie, the ballet Phases which was performed by the New South Wales Dance Company at the Sydney Opera House. While performing in Superstar, English also performed as a rock vocalist both with bands, Tapestry, Pulsar and Duck, and solo.

In March 1973, he sang on the studio cast recording of Reg Livermore and Patrick Flynn's rock opera, Ned Kelly, and used some of the Superstar chorus band to help record his debut solo album, Wine Dark Sea released on Warm & Genuine Records/Phonogram Records. His debut single "Handbags and Gladrags", released at the same time, was a cover of the Mike d'Abo song, which had been a Top 40 hit in the UK for singer Chris Farlowe in 1967. English's version peaked at No.50 on the Australian singles charts. His second single from the album was the Webber / Rice song "Close Every Door" from their Joseph and the Amazing Technicolor Dreamcoat stage musical.

It's All a Game, his second solo album, was released in 1974 on Warm & Genuine and featured "Turn the Page" which peaked at No.20 on the national singles charts in February 1975. "Lovin' Arms" was released in June 1975 as the lead single from his third studio album, Hollywood Seven The album produced three singles including "Hollywood Seven" which peaked at No.13 in May 1976. English performed a duet with fellow Superstar lead, Trevor White to release a single "Laid Back in Anger" but it had no singles chart success. His next album, Minutes to Midnight was released in 1977.

English created the Jon English Band for touring with Steve Doran (keyboards), Danny Groves (drums), Eric Macitchka (guitar), Rick Mellick (keyboards), James Rattray (bass) and Mike Wade (guitar). His fifth studio album Words are not Enough from 1978 contained the title track which peaked at No.6 and "Night in Paradise" which peaked at No.44. English also performed in the stage musical The Bacchoi in 1974 for Nimrod Theatre Company; and in minor TV roles in police dramas Matlock Police in 1975, Homicide in 1976 and Chopper Squad in 1978. A recurring role in Number 96 was as a cultish drug lord, "The Master", in 1976. English described these roles "I was doing a lot of police shows in those days. I got to do them all. I was always a drug-crazed axe murdering hippy."

In 1978, TV's Seven Network and Pegasus Productions approached English to take the role of Jonathan Garrett in the historical romance miniseries Against the Wind. Prior to production he asked if he could organise the score and soundtrack with his friend, Mario Millo.

From the soundtrack, "Six Ribbons" was released as a single by English and Millo. It peaked at No.5 on the National singles charts and the soundtrack peaked at No.10 on the National albums charts. On 16 March 1979 English won the TV Week Logie Award for 'Best New Talent in Australia' for his acting performance in Against the Wind, the programme won two other Logie Awards. English won the 'Most Popular Male Performer' award at the 1979 TV Week/Countdown Music Awards.

He released his first compilation album English History in August, which peaked at No.4 on the national albums charts and sold over 180,000 copies. Singles success with "Get Your Love Right", which peaked at No.27 and "Hot Town", which peaked at No.11; prompted English to form Baxter Funt, containing John Coker (bass), Greg Henson (drums), Tony Naylor (guitar; ex-Bootleg Family Band/Avalanche), Mike Wade (guitar) and Peter White (keyboards). Henson and Wade had been in the Superstar chorus band from 1972 and, as part of Baxter Funt, they were taken on a national tour and then internationally.

=== 1980s: International success ===
In April 1980, English released Calm Before the Storm which peaked at No.17 on the albums charts, with a single "Carmilla" peaking at No.27; this was followed by the less successful In Roads from 1981 and single "Straight from the Heart". Meanwhile, Against the Wind was shown on international TV stations in United Kingdom and other parts of Europe as Gegen den Wind in Germany and Mot alla vindar in Scandinavia. Success in Scandinavia included the soundtrack peaking at No.1 on the Norwegian Albums charts and double-A sided single, "Mot alla vendor"/"Six Ribbons" peaked at No.1 on the Norwegian Singles charts.

English History, his compilation album also peaked at No.1, follow up albums Calm Before the Storm and In Roads both reached the Top Ten in Norway. In Sweden the soundtrack and the "Six Ribbons" single both peaked at No.4 on the relevant charts in 1980, later English History and "Hollywood Seven" reached the top twenty in their charts. In 1981, English toured the United Kingdom and Scandinavia with Mario Millo (guitars, ex-Sebastian Hardie), (guitar), Jackie Orszaczky (bass; ex-Syrius, Bakery, Marcia Hines Band), Coz Russo (keyboards), Richard Gawned (tenor sax, flute; ex-Marcia Hines Band) and Nick Lister (drums; ex-Kush).

In June 1982, the live double album, Beating the Boards was released, with backing by the Foster Brothers containing John Coker (bass), John Dallimore (guitar, flute, vocals; ex-Redhouse), Peter Deacon (keyboards, vocals), Greg Henson (drums) and Keith Kerwin (guitar, vocals; ex-Southern Star Band). The single "Beating the Boards' was released in June 1982 and peaked at No.97. English teamed with former Superstar co-lead, Marcia Hines, to produce July 1982's mini-album Jokers and Queens and its self-titled single, the album peaked at No.36 on the Australian albums charts and the single reached No.62 on the singles charts. Some People... was released in 1982 and produced the top 50 single "Some People (Have All The Fun)". In August 1984, English and Renée Geyer released "Every Beat of My Heart" from the Street Hero soundtrack.

In 1984, English wrote the national anthem for Hutt River Province.

English took on the role of Pirate King for the first time in the 1984 production of Gilbert and Sullivan's comic opera The Pirates of Penzance alongside June Bronhill and fellow actor/singer Simon Gallaher as Frederic. English estimates he has performed his favorite role of Pirate King over 1,000 times. He later took on other stage musicals, including Rasputin (1987) and Big River (1988), toured with various line-ups of the Foster Brothers and released Some People... (1983) produced by David Mackay, Dark Horses (1987) and The Busker (1988), with his best charting Australian single from these being "Some People (Have all the Fun)" which peaked at No.50 in 1983. During 1983–85, English won four Mo Awards with three consecutive 'Entertainer of the Year' awards and a further 'Male Vocal Performer' in 1985.

In 1988, English collaborated on the song "You're Not Alone" which was The Australian Official Olympic Team Song. It peaked at number 23 on the ARIA Charts.

=== 1990s: All Together Now ===
In 1990, English released Busking/Always the Busker but the album did not chart. In November 1990, "Love Has Power" was released as a single from his musical concept album, Paris. At the ARIA Music Awards of 1991, the album won the ARIA Award for Best Original Soundtrack, Cast or Show Album..

During 1991—93, English played the main role of Bobby Rivers in the TV sitcom All Together Now. His role of a faded one hit wonder rock star displayed his acting and comedy skills during 101 episodes. English returned to stage musicals to play roles in Simon Gallaher's production company Essgee Entertainment's trilogy of updated Gilbert and Sullivan works: Pirate King in The Pirates of Penzance (1994), Pooh-Bah in The Mikado (1995) and Dick Deadeye in H.M.S. Pinafore (1997). A performance of each production was broadcast on Australian TV, then released on VHS video and later on DVD.

In 1995, Jon English, a portrait by artist Danelle Bergstrom, won the 'Packing Room Prize' in the Archibald Prize.

From 1997 to June 1998, English toured his own musical show, Turn the Page. Later in 1998, English toured the Michael Frayn show Noises Off. In 1999, English toured Australia and New Zealand performing in A Funny Thing Happened on the Way to the Forum

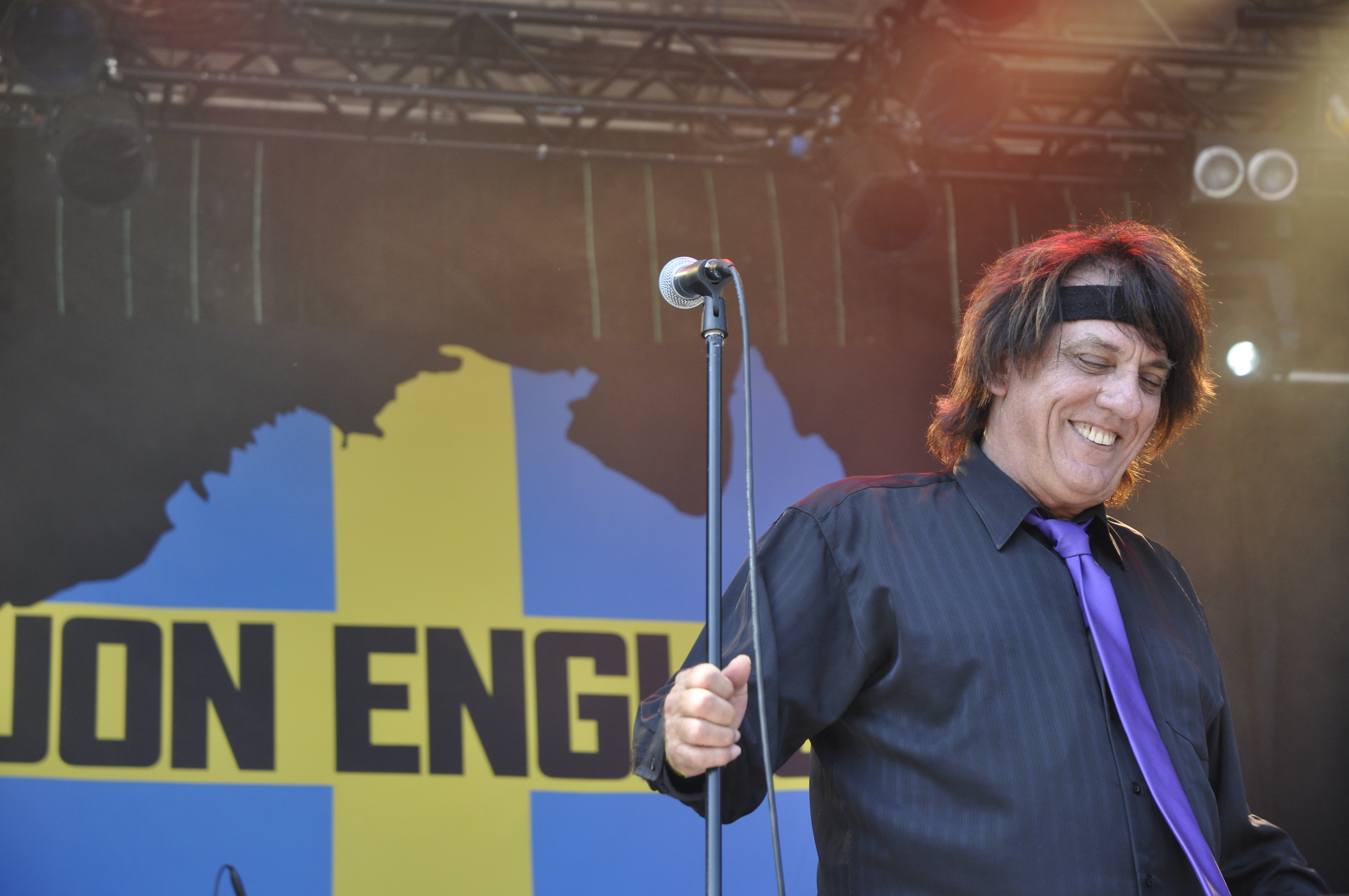
Jon English live at Sweden Rock Festival 8 June 2013

=== 2000s ===
In 2000, English finished another musical project called Buskers and Angels, which toured September and October 2000 to warm reviews, and subsequently releasing a CD of the same name. At the Gimme Ted benefit concert on 10 March 2001, English was backed by his former band, Sebastian Hardie, for two of his songs. He released the amateur rights to his rock opera Paris and it was first performed in 2003 in Sydney and Gosford, New South Wales, with English assisting in the direction of the production and appearing as the Fisherman in one performance at Gosford.

The piece was revived in Melbourne in 2004 and in Adelaide in 2008. Also in 2008, a re-worked version was performed in Sydney, with English as Menelaus. This revised production was met with generally positive reviews, but a few months later, English and Mackay completely updated the show.

In 2004, English appeared as Sergeant Wilson in stage productions of Dad's Army touring through Australia and New Zealand.

In 2006, English toured the country again as part of the Countdown Spectacular. Also in 2007, English and Peter Cupples toured their collaborative show Uncorked. Later in 2007, English filmed a children's mini-series titled Time Trackers in New Zealand, playing the role of a lovable but havoc raising hologram from the future.

In 2008, English was awarded a Life Membership to the Parramatta Eels Rugby Leagues Club. English was hired as a motivational coach for the 2009 season, when Parramatta lost the NRL Grand Final, having beaten 14 other teams in home and away games to get to the Premiership decider.

In 2009, he toured in a new production titled The Rock Show, a revue featuring classic rock music of the '60s and '70s, including songs by the Rolling Stones, Led Zeppelin, Bob Dylan, Deep Purple, Elton John and other high-profile musicians of those decades. It was conceived by "Paris" collaborator and director Stuart Smith with musical director Isaac Hayward. In 2010 "The Rock Show" made two appearances in Tasmania in support of the "Save the Tasmanian Devil" breeding programme. English was an ambassador for the programme. The Rock Show toured until 2013, with a CD/DVD released in 2012. In 2010, English played the title role in The Removalists by David Williamson at the Perth Theatre Company.

In 2012, English returned to Tasmania, working with Encore Theatre, for a revival of Jesus Christ Superstar, with English in the role of Pilate. Funds raised at each performance and at the Launceston preview were donated to the programme. In 2013 Jon English played at the Sweden Rock Festival, backed up by Swedish hard rock band Spearfish.

In March 2026, Jokers and Queens and Six Ribbons – The Ultimate Collection was re-released alongside a new Rarities album.

== Death ==
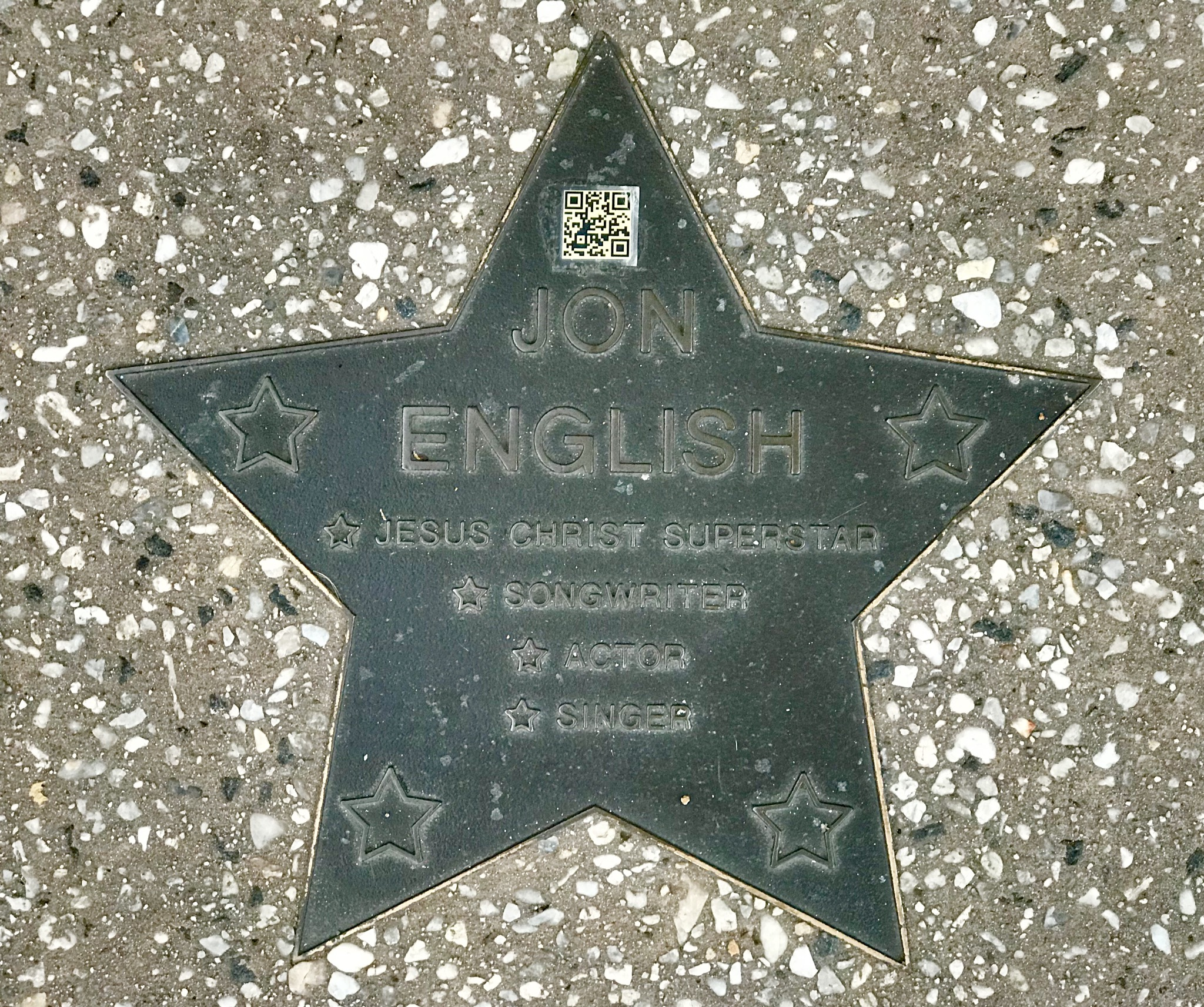
Jon English, Caloundra Walk of Stars, Queensland

In late February 2016, English was hospitalised due to "unexpected health problems" and was forced to cancel several scheduled performances due to planned surgery for an aortic aneurysm. He died following post-operative complications in the late evening hours of 9 March 2016, seventeen days short of his 67th birthday.

A public memorial service commemorating his life was held at the Capitol Theatre, Sydney on the evening of 4 April 2016. The memorial took the form of a tribute concert and included performances by the Foster Brothers, John Paul Young, Simon Gallaher and John Waters among others.

== Interests outside the arts ==
English described himself as a "passionate" supporter of the Australian rugby league team Parramatta Eels.

== Discography ==
=== Solo albums ===
- Wine Dark Sea (1973)
- It's All a Game (1974)
- Hollywood Seven (1976)
- Minutes to Midnight (1977)
- Words Are Not Enough (1978)
- Calm Before the Storm (1980)
- In Roads (1981)
- Jokers and Queens (with Marcia Hines) (1982)
- Some People... (1983)
- Dark Horses (1987)
- The Busker (1988)

=== Soundtrack albums ===
- Against the Wind aka Mot alla vindar (with Mario Millo) (1978)

== Filmography ==
=== Film ===
Year	Title	Role	Notes
1980	Touch and Go	Frank Butterfield	Film
2000	Walk the Talk	Phil Wehner	Film

=== Television ===
Year	Title	Role	Notes
1972	Jesus Christ Superstar	Judas Iscariot	TV broadcast
1975	Matlock Police	Quinlan	Episode: "The Grass is Greener"
1976	Homicide	Gordon Haynes / Musician	Pilot episode & episode 504
1978	Against the Wind	Jonathan Garrett	Miniseries, 13 episodes
1988	Rafferty's Rules	David Anson	Season 2, episode 2
1991–1993	All Together Now	Bobby Rivers	101 episodes
1994	The Pirates of Penzance	The Pirate King	Broadcast of theatre production from Essgee Entertainment
1995	Frontline	Himself	Episode: "Let the Children Play"
2000	Pizza		1 episode
2006	Countdown Spectacular	Performer	
2008	Time Trackers	Old Troy	
2011	RocKwiz Christmas Special	Performer	

== Stage ==
Year	Title	Role	Notes	Ref.
1972–1978	Jesus Christ Superstar	Judas Iscariot	Australia & New Zealand tour with Harry M. Miller Attractions; 700+ performances	
1974	The Bacchoi		Nimrod Theatre Company	
1979	Marcia Hines and Jon English		St George Leagues Club, Sydney with Delicado Productions	
1984–1986	The Pirates of Penzance	The Pirate King	Australia & New Zealand tour with Victoria State Opera	
1987	Rasputin The Musical Revolution	Grigori Rasputin	State Theatre, Sydney	
1988	Big River: The Adventures of Huckleberry Finn	Pap Finn	Australian tour	
1990	The Hunting of the Snark		Melbourne Concert Hall with Victorian Arts Centre	
1994	The Pirates of Penzance	The Pirate King	Essgee Entertainment	
1995–1996	The Mikado	Pooh-Bah	Australian tour with Essgee Entertainment	
1997	H.M.S. Pinafore	Dick Deadeye	Australia & NZ tour with Essgee Entertainment	
1998	Noises Off		Australian tour with Twelfth Night Theatre	
1998–1999	A Funny Thing Happened on the Way to the Forum	Prologus / Pseudolus	Australia & NZ tour with Essgee Entertainment	
2001	Are You Being Served?	Mr. James 'Dick' Lucas		
2001	Don’t Dress for Dinner			
2001–2003	The Pirates of Penzance	The Pirate King	Essgee Entertainment	
2003	Bedside Manners		Brisbane	
2003–2004	Paris	Co-writer (with David Mackay)	The Regals Musical Society	
2004	OzMade Musicals Concert		BMW Edge, Melbourne	
2004	Dad's Army	Sergeant Wilson	Nambour Civic Centre, Twelfth Night Theatre, Brisbane	
2005	Encore		Norwood Concert Hall, Adelaide	
2005	My Fair Lady	Alfie Doolittle	Comedy Theatre, Melbourne	
2008	Blood Brothers	Narrator	Jetty Memorial Theatre, Coffs Harbour	
2010	The Removalists	The Removalist	Playhouse, Perth with Perth Theatre Company	
2012	Jesus Christ Superstar	Pontius Pilate		
2013	Rock for Doc	Performer	Fundraiser show at Enmore Theatre, Sydney	
2013	Hairspray	Edna Turnblad	Riverside Theatres Parramatta with Riverside Productions / Packemin Productions	
2014	Spamalot	King Arthur	QPAC, Brisbane with Harvest Rain Theatre Company	

== Awards ==
Year	Work	Award	Category	Result	Ref.
1979	Against the Wind	TV Week Logie Awards	Best New Talent in Australia	Won	
1979	Jon English	TV Week Countdown Awards	Most Outstanding Achievement	Nominated	
1979	Jon English	TV Week Countdown Awards	Most Popular Male Performer	Won	
1980	Jon English	TV Week Countdown Awards	Most Popular Male Performer	Nominated	
1983	Jon English	Mo Awards	Entertainer of the Year	Won	
1984	Jon English	Mo Awards	Entertainer of the Year	Won	
1984	The Pirates of Penzance	Green Room Awards	Green Room Award for Male Actor in a Leading Role (Music Theatre)	Won	
1985	Jon English	TV Week Countdown Awards	Male Vocal Entertainer of the Year	Won	
1985	Jon English	TV Week Countdown Awards	Entertainer of the Year	Won	
1991	Paris (with David Mackay)	ARIA Music Awards	Best Original Soundtrack, Cast or Show Album	Won	
1991	Paris (with David Mackay)	ARIA Music Awards	Best Adult Contemporary Album	Nominated	
2011	Jon English (The Rock Show)	Mo Awards	Best Rock Band or Performer of the Year	Won	
2012	Jon English Band	Mo Awards	Best Rock Act of the Year	Won	
2012	The Rock Show	ARIA Music Awards	Best Original Soundtrack, Cast or Show Album	Nominated	
