= Hollywood Seven (song) =

Single by Jon English

from the album Hollywood Seven
- B-side: "Sandcastles"
- Released: April 1976
- Recorded: Armstrong Studios, Melbourne
- Genre: Pop rock, soft rock
- Length: 4:27
- Label: Polydor
- Songwriters: Gloria Sklerov, Harry Lloyd
- Producers: Rod Thomas, William Motzing

Jon English singles chronology
"Lovin' Arms" (1975)	"Hollywood Seven" (1976)	"Laid Back in Anger" (1976)

"Hollywood Seven" is a song by Australian singer Jon English. The song was written by Gloria Sklerov and Harry Lloyd and produced by Rod Thomas, William Motzing. The song was the second single from English's third studio album, Hollywood Seven and became English's 3rd highest charting single, reaching No. 13 on the Australian Kent Music Report in 1976; after "Words Are Not Enough", which reached No 6 on the Australian Kent Music Report in 1978 and "Six Ribbons" credited to Jon English and Mario Millo, which reached No. 5 on the Australian Kent Music Report in 1979.

Gloria Sklerov recalls the writing of "Hollywood Seven": "On the way home on the freeway, I passed a motel called "Hollywood Eight" which intrigued me. I started to think about who might be checking in there. When I got together with Harry Lloyd, we discussed it and decided to change the name to "Hollywood Seven" because it 'sang' better. We then plotted the story and it all sort of came to be like it was meant to. We were thrilled when we heard Jon's record because they used some of the synth riffs we had used on the demo and his vocal was great... As a writer, I was very proud of Jon's version."

== Track listing ==
7" Single

- Side A "Hollywood Seven" - 3:58
- Side B "Sandcastles" - 3:06

== Charts ==
=== Weekly charts ===
Chart (1976/80)	Peak position
Australia (Kent Music Report)	13
Sweden (Sverigetopplistan)	18

=== Year-end charts ===
Chart (1976)	Position
Australia (Kent Music Report)	79

== Cover versions ==
- Dennis Waterman - 1976
- Jon English - 1976
- Anthony Newley - 1977
- Vicki Lawrence - 1977
- Alexander Love - 1979
- Juliane Werding - 1980 (translated to German) "Grossstadtlichter"
- Alides Hidding, the singer of the Time Bandits- 1980
- Tex Perkins - 2008
- Karsu - 2021
