= Six Ribbons =

Single by Jon English and Mario Millo

from the album Against the Wind
- B-side: "Mary's Theme"
- Released: 1978
- Genre: Pop rock, Soft rock, folk, country
- Length: 3:15
- Label: Polydor / Frituna
- Songwriter: Jon English
- Producers: Jon English, Mario Millo

Jon English singles chronology
"Nights in Paradise" (1978)	"Six Ribbons" (1978)	"Get Your Love Right" (1979)

"Six Ribbons" is a 1978 song credited to Australian musicians Jon English and Mario Millo. The song was written by Jon English and was included on the soundtrack of the Australian miniseries, Against the Wind.

The song was certified gold in Australia.

== Track listing ==
Australian 7" Single

- Side A "Six Ribbons" - 3:15
- Side B "Mary's Theme" - 4:00

Scandinavian 7" Single

- Side A "Six Ribbons" - 3:15
- Side B "Against The Wind" - 2:32

== Charts ==
=== Weekly charts ===
"Six Ribbons" entered the Kent Music Report on 5 December 1978, before peaking at number 5 in 1979. The song peaked at number 1 in Norway in December 1981.

Chart (1978/81)	Peak position
Australian Kent Music Report	5
New Zealand (Recorded Music NZ)	3
Norway (VG-lista)	1
Sweden (Sverigetopplistan)	4

=== Year-end charts ===
Chart (1979)	Position
Australia (Kent Music Report)	49

== Cover Version ==
- In 2000, Donald Hall covered the song on his album Harp Moods.
- In 2005, Black Majesty covered the song on their album, Silent Company.
- In 2005, Green Carnation covered the song on their EP The Burden is Mine... Alone. and in their 2006 limited edition studio album The Acoustic Verses.
- In 2009, Ruiseart Alcorn covered the song on his album, The Ravenswing Years.
- In 2012, Gavin Lockley covered the song on his album, Orchestral Songs of Australia.
- In 2013, Didrik Solli-Tangen released a version of the song as a single from his album, The Journey.
- In 2013, Lise Olden covered the song on her album Min Skattekiste.
- In 2016 Billy Macro reinterpreted and released the song to coincide with the Netflix miniseries "For an eshay, with care".
- In 2016, Richard Clayderman covered the song on his album, A Musical Journey.
- In 2017, The Ten Tenors covered the song on their album, Wish You Were Here.

== See also ==
- VG-lista 1964 to 1994
