= Turn the Page =

1972 song by Bob Seger

Single by Bob Seger & The Silver Bullet Band

from the album Back in '72, Live Bullet
- B-side: "Get Out of Denver"
- Written: 1972
- Released: January 1973 (studio original); April 12, 1976 (Live Bullet)
- Length: 5:11 (studio); 5:06 (live)
- Label: Capitol
- Songwriter: Bob Seger
- Producers: Punch Andrews; Bob Seger

"Turn the Page" is a song by American singer Bob Seger written in 1972 and included on his Back in '72 album in 1973. It was not released as a single until Seger's live version of the song on the 1976 Live Bullet album got released in Germany and the UK. The song became a mainstay of album-oriented rock radio stations, and still gets significant airplay on classic rock stations.

== Inspiration ==
"Turn the Page" is about the emotional and social ups and downs of a rock musician's life on the road. Seger wrote it in 1972 while touring with Teegarden & Van Winkle. Drummer David Teegarden (of Teegarden & Van Winkle and later the Silver Bullet Band) recalls:

We had been playing somewhere in the Midwest, or the northern reaches, on our way to North or South Dakota. [Guitarist] Mike Bruce was with us. We'd been traveling all night from the Detroit area to make this gig, driving in this blinding snowstorm. It was probably 3 in the morning. Mike decided it was time to get gas. He was slowing down to exit the interstate and spied a truck stop. We all had very long hair back then – it was the hippie era – but Skip, Mike and Bob had all stuffed their hair up in their hats. You had to be careful out on the road like that, because you'd get ostracized. When I walked in, there was this gauntlet of truckers making comments – "Is that a girl or man?" I was seething; those guys were laughing their asses off, a big funny joke. That next night, after we played our gig – I think it was Mitchell, S.D. – Seger says, "Hey, I've been working on this song for a bit, I've got this new line for it. He played it on acoustic guitar, and there was that line: "Oh, the same old cliches / 'Is that a woman or a man?' " It was "Turn the Page."

Tom Weschler, then road manager for Seger, remembers the same incident:

"Turn the Page," Bob's great road song, came along in '72, while we were driving home from a gig. I think we were in Dubuque, Iowa, in winter and stopped at a restaurant. We stood out when we entered a store or a gas station or a restaurant en masse. At this restaurant it was particularly bright inside, so there weren't any dark corners to hide in. All these local guys were looking at us like, "What are these guys? Is that a woman or a man?" – just like in the song. ... That was one incident, but there were so many others on the road that led Seger to write that song.

Seger said of the song:

I never thought that song would last as long as it has. That’s one of the songs we must play or people get very agitated. If we don’t play that the fans are definitely disappointed.

That song captured something. I wrote "Turn The Page" in 1971. It was the eight or ninth year of that 10-year period where I was going nowhere fast. We’d been harassed at a truck stop in Wisconsin at two in the morning by some salesmen who kept calling us “girls” because we all had long hair. So we left because we didn’t want to get into a fight and become some police report. The next night I’m sitting there singing: ‘On a long and lonesome highway, east of Omaha. You can listen to the engine moanin’ out its one-note song… Well you walk into a restaurant all strung out from the road. And you feel the eyes upon you as you’re shakin’ off the cold. You pretend it doesn’t bother you but you just want to explode….’

I was thinking about how these people hate you because of the way you look, and how unreasonable it is. That became part of it. But the bigger thing, I think, was the real weariness of the road, and I tried to capture that. I think I captured it for truck drivers. I think I captured it for travelling businessmen. And I think I just captured it for people who have to travel a lot and just plain miss home or family or both.

While on tour in Milwaukee, Wisconsin, on November 16, 2006, promoting his 16th studio album Face the Promise, Seger said he wrote the song in a hotel room in Eau Claire, Wisconsin.

== Instrumentation ==
Both Seger's studio and live versions of "Turn the Page" feature a Mellotron and a saxophone part played by founding Silver Bullet member Alto Reed. Tom Weschler allegedly helped inspire Reed to create the opening melody. During recording, Weschler told Reed: "Alto, think about it like this: You're in New York City, on the Bowery. It's 3 a.m. You're under a streetlamp. There's a light mist coming down. You're all by yourself. Show me what that sounds like." With that, Reed played the opening melody to "Turn the Page".

== Personnel on live recording ==
Credits are adapted from the liner notes of Seger's 1994 Greatest Hits compilation.

- Bob Seger – lead vocals, electric piano

The Silver Bullet Band

- Drew Abbott – guitar
- Chris Campbell – bass
- Charlie Allen Martin – drums
- Alto Reed – saxophone
- Robyn Robbins – Mellotron

== Reception ==
Classic Rock History critic Janey Roberts rated it as Seger's third best song, saying that it "featured one of the most memorable saxophone lines in rock and roll history" and that "'The same old cliches, is that a woman or a man?' is easily one of his most haunting lyrics."

== Certifications ==
Region	Certification	Certified units/sales
New Zealand (RMNZ)	Gold	15,000^{‡}
United States (RIAA)	Platinum	1,000,000^{‡}
^{‡} Sales+streaming figures based on certification alone.

== Jon English cover ==
Australian singer Jon English released a version of the song in 1974 as the lead single from his second studio album, It's All a Game. The song peaked at number 20 on the Kent Music Report.

== Waylon Jennings cover ==
American country singer Waylon Jennings released a version of the song on his 1985 album, Turn the Page.

== Golden Earring cover ==
Dutch rock band Golden Earring released a version of the song on the 1995 album, Love Sweat.

== Metallica cover ==
"Turn the Page"

Single by Metallica

from the album Garage Inc.
- B-side: "Bleeding Me"; "Stone Cold Crazy"; "The Wait"
- Released: November 16, 1998
- Studio: The Record Plant
- Genre: Heavy metal; hard rock
- Length: 6:06
- Label: Elektra
- Songwriter: Bob Seger
- Producer: Bob Rock

Metallica singles chronology
"Better than You" (1998)	"Turn the Page" (1998)	"Whiskey in the Jar" (1999)

Music video
- "Turn the Page" on YouTube

American heavy metal band Metallica released a version of the song as the first single from their 1998 Garage Inc. album. The song reached number one on the US Billboard Mainstream Rock Tracks chart for 11 consecutive weeks, the highest number of weeks Metallica has ever spent at the top until it tied with Lux Æterna in 2022; the song also reached number 2 on the Billboard Bubbling Under Hot 100. Drummer Lars Ulrich had heard the original song while driving across the Golden Gate Bridge and later commented that he thought it "had [Metallica frontman] James Hetfield all over it". Metallica's rendition is taken at much the same tempo as Seger's, but with a heavier feel, and the saxophone melody is replaced by a high slide guitar line from Kirk Hammett.

=== Seger's thoughts ===
When asked about his thoughts on this version, Seger told Artisan News, "I loved it. They told me they were gonna do it, and I loved it. I really like the drums especially because our drums are really simple."

=== Music video ===
The accompanying music video was directed by Jonas Åkerlund and is presented in a documentary-style format starring Ginger Lynn as a single mother. Lynn initially turned down the role several times over the course of three months, as she found the premise denigrating and was skeptical with Metallica covering one of her favorite Seger songs. Eventually, she accepted the role, but had to put on 10-15 pounds, as Åkerlund found her too thin and attractive. The music video filmed in October 1998 in Los Angeles. It premiered on October 26, 1998.

In the video, a single mother lives with her daughter at a motel. She drives her daughter to do laundry and have lunch before heading to a strip club, where she leaves her daughter in the dressing room while working as a stripper. At the end of her shift, they drive back to the motel, and once her daughter goes to sleep, she prepares for her night job as a street prostitute. The mother picks up a client and leads him back to her motel room, but once she strips naked, the client slaps her and violently has sex with her. Moments later, her daughter wakes up to see the client dressing up and throwing cash at her mother before leaving.

Upon its release, the video drew criticism from women's rights groups, who were furious over Lynn's role as a sex worker. Furthermore, a lawyer representing the Children's Right Council suggested Metallica be prosecuted under child endangerment laws for the premise of the daughter's exposure to her mother's line of work.

=== Charts ===
==== Weekly charts ====
Chart (1998–1999)	Peak position
Australia (ARIA)	11
Austria (Ö3 Austria Top 40)	19
Belgium (Ultratop 50 Flanders)	33
Canada Top Singles (RPM)	5
Europe (Eurochart Hot 100)	57
Finland (Suomen virallinen lista)	7
Germany (GfK)	23
Netherlands (Single Top 100)	42
New Zealand (Recorded Music NZ)	22
Norway (VG-lista)	11
Poland Airplay (Music & Media)	7
Sweden (Sverigetopplistan)	13
US Bubbling Under Hot 100 (Billboard)	2
US Alternative Airplay (Billboard)	39
US Mainstream Rock Airplay (Billboard)	1

==== Year-end charts ====
Chart (1998)	Position
Australia (ARIA)	81

Chart (1999)	Position
US Mainstream Rock Tracks (Billboard)	7

=== Certifications ===
Region	Certification	Certified units/sales
Australia (ARIA)	Platinum	70,000^{‡}
Sweden (GLF)	Gold	15,000^{^}
United States (RIAA)	Platinum	1,000,000^{‡}
^{^} Shipments figures based on certification alone.^{‡} Sales+streaming figures based on certification alone.

== Influences ==
Jon Bon Jovi has claimed that the song was a big influence on him and Richie Sambora when they were writing their 1986 song "Wanted Dead or Alive".

Garth Brooks has described the song's opening chord as evoking thunderclouds, inspiring the sound of his 1991 song "The Thunder Rolls". Brooks has repeatedly performed "Turn the Page" as a concert cover, including during his Las Vegas residencies and throughout his 2026 tour.

Before performing the song with Seger at CMT Crossroads in 2014, Jason Aldean said "it was a song I used to always sing" when playing nightclubs & bars at 14, 15 years old, even though he didn't really know "what the hell it meant." After stating it had a whole new meaning for him 20-something years later, he added "it's always been one of my favorite songs of all time by any singer."

== Awards ==
The video of the performance with Aldean won the CMT Music Award for Performance of the Year.
