= The New Seekers discography =

- Studio albums: 15
- Live albums: 3
- Compilation albums: 13
- Singles: 35

This is the discography of British pop group the New Seekers.

== Albums ==
=== Studio albums ===
Title	Album details	Peak chart positions					
Title	Album details	UK	AUS	CAN	FIN	NOR	US
The New Seekers	Released: January 1970; Label: Philips; Formats: LP	—	—	—	—	—	—
Keith Potger and the New Seekers	Released: November 1970; Label: Philips; Formats: LP	—	—	—	—	—	—
Beautiful People	Released: March 1971; Label: Philips, Elektra; Formats: LP, MC, 8-track	—	—	80	—	—	136
New Colours	Released: September 1971; Label: Polydor, Elektra; Formats: LP, MC, 8-track	40	—	—	—	—	—
We'd Like to Teach the World to Sing	Released: December 1971; Label: Elektra; Formats: LP, 8-track; North American repackaging of New Colours	—	—	29	—	—	37
We'd Like to Teach the World to Sing	Released: March 1972; Label: Polydor; Formats: LP, MC, 8-track; Different track listing to the North American release	2	—	—	8	10	—
Never Ending Song of Love	Released: June 1972; Label: Polydor; Formats: LP, MC; Repackaging of Beautiful People	35	—	—	—	—	—
Circles	Released: June 1972; Label: Polydor, Elektra; Formats: LP, MC, reel-to-reel	23	—	—	—	—	166
Come Softly to Me	Released: December 1972; Label: MGM; Formats: LP, 8-track; North America-only release	—	—	—	—	—	—
Now	Released: March 1973; Label: Polydor, MGM; Formats: LP, MC, 8-track; Retitled Pinball Wizards in North America	47	—	—	—	—	190
Together	Released: March 1974; Label: Polydor; Formats: LP, MC, 8-track	12	44	—	—	—	—
Farewell Album	Released: August 1974; Label: Polydor; Formats: LP, MC, 8-track	—	—	—	—	—	—
Together Again	Released: November 1976; Label: CBS; Formats: LP, MC	—	—	—	—	—	—
Anthem - One Day In Every Week	Released: September 1978; Label: CBS; Formats: LP, MC	—	—	—	—	—	—
Tell Me	Released: 1982; Label: Melody; Formats: LP; Russia-only release	—	—	—	—	—	—
"—" denotes releases that did not chart or were not released in that territory.

=== Live albums ===
Title	Album details
Live at the Royal Albert Hall	Released: November 1972; Label: Polydor, MGM; Formats: 2xLP, LP, 8-track
The New Seekers in Moscow	Released: 1982; Label: Melody; Formats: LP; Russia-only release
Live	Released: 2007; Label: CSL; Formats: CD

=== Compilation albums ===
Title	Album details	Peak chart positions
Title	Album details	UK
The Best of the New Seekers	Released: February 1973; Label: Elektra; Formats: LP, 8-track, reel-to-reel; North America-only release	—
In Perfect Harmony	Released: September 1973; Label: Polydor; Formats: LP, MC, 8-track	—
The Best of the New Seekers	Released: 1975; Label: Reader's Digest; Formats: 6xLP	—
The Best of the New Seekers	Released: June 1982; Label: Polydor; Formats: LP, MC	—
15 Great Hits	Released: November 1983; Label: Orbit; Formats: LP	—
Greatest Hits	Released: 1987; Label: The Collection; Formats: CD	—
Anthems – Their Very Best	Released: 1995; Label: Hallmark; Formats: CD	—
The World of the New Seekers	Released: 1996; Label: Spectrum Music; Formats: CD	—
Songbook 1970–74	Released: February 2006; Label: Universal; Formats: 2xCD	—
It's Been Too Long – The Greatest Hits and More	Released: July 2009; Label: Universal Music TV; Formats: CD	17
The Albums 1970–73	Released: 15 February 2019; Label: Caroline International; Formats: 5xCD	—
Gold	Released: 18 September 2020; Label: Crimson; Formats: 3xCD, LP	—
The Albums 1976–85	Released: 12 August 2022; Label: Cherry Red; Formats: 4xCD	—
"—" denotes releases that did not chart or were not released in that territory.

== Singles ==
Title	Year	Peak chart positions										Album
Title	Year	UK	AUS	CAN	FIN	GER	IRE	NL	NZ	US	US AC	Album
"Meet My Lord"	1969	—	—	—	—	—	—	—	—	—	—	The New Seekers
"Look What They've Done to My Song Ma"	1970	44	3	3	—	—	—	—	1	14	4	Keith Potger and the New Seekers
"When There's No Love Left"	1970	—	100	—	—	—	—	—	—	—	33	Beautiful People
"Beautiful People"	1970	—	—	42	—	—	—	—	—	67	11	Beautiful People
"Nickel Song"	1971	—	67	81	—	—	—	—	4	81	13	New Colours
"Never Ending Song of Love"	1971	2	25	—	—	4	1	—	17	—	—	Beautiful People
"Tonight"	1971	—	—	—	—	—	—	—	—	—	—	New Colours
"Good Old Fashioned Music"	1971	53	—	—	—	—	—	—	—	—	—	New Colours
"I'd Like to Teach the World to Sing (In Perfect Harmony)"	1971	1	7	3	6	24	1	—	1	7	27	We'd Like to Teach the World to Sing
"Beg, Steal or Borrow"	1972	2	36	61	1	5	3	3	2	81	15	We'd Like to Teach the World to Sing
"Circles"	1972	4	20	42	—	—	3	—	—	87	27	Circles
"Dance, Dance, Dance"	1972	—	—	—	—	—	—	—	—	84	24	Circles
"For You We Sing"	1972	—	—	—	—	—	—	—	—	—	—	Non-album singles
"Come Softly to Me"	1972	20	73	60	—	—	—	—	—	95	21	Non-album singles
"Pinball Wizard-See Me Feel Me"	1973	16	16	28	—	—	20	9	2	29	34	Now
"Nevertheless (I'm in Love with You)"	1973	34	96	—	—	—	—	—	—	—	—	Non-album singles
"Goodbye Is Just Another Word"	1973	36	—	—	—	—	—	—	—	—	—	Non-album singles
"The Greatest Song I've Ever Heard"	1973	—	—	—	—	—	—	—	—	—	16	Together
"We've Got to Do It Now"	1973	53	—	—	—	—	—	—	—	—	—	Non-album single
"You Won't Find Another Fool Like Me"	1973	1	5	81	30	—	1	7	6	—	18	Together
"I Get a Little Sentimental Over You"	1974	5	12	—	—	—	9	—	11	—	—	Together
"Sing Hallelujah"	1974	—	—	—	—	—	—	—	—	—	—	Farewell Album
"It's So Nice (To Have You Home)"	1976	44	72	—	—	—	23	—	—	—	—	Together Again
"I Wanna Go Back"	1976	25	—	—	—	—	—	—	—	—	—	Together Again
"Give Me Love Your Way"	1977	—	—	—	—	—	—	—	—	—	—	Non-album single
"Flashback"	1978	—	—	—	—	—	—	—	—	—	—	Anthem – One Day in Every Week
"Do You Wanna Make Love"	1978	—	—	—	—	—	—	—	—	—	—	Anthem – One Day in Every Week
"Anthem (One Day in Every Week)"	1978	21	—	—	—	—	15	—	—	—	—	Anthem – One Day in Every Week
"You Needed Me"	1978	—	—	—	—	—	—	—	—	—	—	Non-album singles
"Don't Stop the Music"	1979	—	—	—	—	—	—	—	—	—	—	Non-album singles
"Love Is a Song"	1979	—	—	—	—	—	—	—	—	—	—	Non-album singles
"Tell Me"	1980	—	—	—	—	—	—	—	—	—	—	Non-album singles
"California Nights"	1980	—	—	—	—	—	—	—	—	—	—	Non-album singles
"All the Way"	1983	—	—	—	—	—	—	—	—	—	—	Non-album singles
"Let the Bells Ring Out Forever"	1985	—	—	—	—	—	—	—	—	—	—	Non-album singles
"—" denotes releases that did not chart or were not released in that territory.
