= Beautiful People (album) =

1971 studio album by The New Seekers

Studio album by The New Seekers
- Released: May 1971
- Recorded: 1970–71
- Studio: IBC Studios, London
- Genre: Pop, MOR
- Length: 37.18 (UK), 38.56 (US)
- Label: Philips, Elektra (US)
- Producer: David Mackay

The New Seekers chronology
Keith Potger and the New Seekers (1970)	Beautiful People (1971)	New Colours (1971)

Beautiful People is a 1971 album by UK pop group The New Seekers. This was the group's third album and their last one released in the UK on the Philips record label. It was their first to be solely produced by David Mackay, who would guide the group through their most successful period over the next two years.

== Overview ==
The New Seekers had found top 20 success in the US with the song "Look What They've Done to My Song Ma" in 1970, which was also a more minor hit in the UK. Subsequent singles, however, failed to attract as much attention until mid-1971 when they released "Never Ending Song of Love", which was featured on this album. The song rose to #2 in the UK and became one of the biggest selling singles of the year, remaining on the chart for 17 weeks. This album, which was released in May 1971 also included the earlier singles "When There's No Love Left" (released in December 1970) and the US-release "Beautiful People", which was written by Melanie Safka, who had also penned the group's first hit. This latter single made #67 on the Billboard Hot 100. The US version of the album differed from the UK release with a slightly different track listing. This was the group's first album release there and reached #136 on the US album charts.

Beautiful People was released on Compact Disc in 2008 as a double-pack with their 1972 album Circles.

== Track listing (UK) ==
Side One

1. "One" (Harry Nilsson) 3.11
2. "Beautiful People" (Melanie Safka) 3.50
3. "Never Ending Song of Love" (Delaney Bramlett) 3.13
4. "Look What You Have Done" (Robb Royer, James Griffin) 2.32
5. "When There's No Love Left" (Brian Peacock, Rob Lovett) 3.43
6. "There's a Light" (Hans Poulsen) 2.09

Side Two

1. "Blackberry Way" (Roy Wood) 2.38
2. "Cincinnati" (Peter Doyle) 3.28
3. "Eighteen Carat Friend" (Bruce Woodley) 2.55
4. "Ain't Love Easy" (Carol Hall) 3.24
5. "Your Song" (Elton John, Bernie Taupin) 3.21
6. "I'll Be Home" (Randy Newman) 2.54

=== Track listing (US) ===
Side One

1. "One"
2. "Allright My Love" (Keith Potger, David Groom) 2.58
3. "Ain't Love Easy"
4. "Blackberry Way"
5. "When There's No Love Left"
6. "Your Song"

Side Two

1. "Look What They've Done to My Song Ma" (Melanie Safka) 3.21
2. "Cincinnati"
3. "Eighteen Carat Friend"
4. "Beautiful People"
5. "I'll Be Home"
6. "Never Ending Song of Love"

Never Ending Song of Love

Studio album by The New Seekers
- Released: June 1972
- Recorded: 1970–71
- Genre: Pop, MOR
- Length: 37.18
- Label: Polydor
- Producer: David Mackay

The New Seekers chronology
We'd Like to Teach the World to Sing (1972)	Never Ending Song of Love (1972)	Circles (1972)

== Never Ending Song of Love ==
By mid 1972, the group had achieved major success in the UK with two more top two hits; "I'd Like to Teach the World to Sing" and "Beg, Steal or Borrow" as well as a #2 album We'd Like to Teach the World to Sing. Eager to cash in on this, the group's new record company Polydor, licensed the tracks from Philips and re-released the album in May 1972 under the new title Never Ending Song of Love. Where the original album had failed to chart in the UK, this time the album entered the charts in August, peaking at #35 and remaining in the top 50 for four weeks.

One reviewer at the time made mention of the fact that it was a re-release and said of the album; "It could rate as one of the best things they have ever done - there's a fine choice of songs...and they can sing well."

=== Track listing ===
Side One

1. "Never Ending Song of Love"
2. "Beautiful People"
3. "One"
4. "Look What You Have Done"
5. "When There's No Love Left"
6. "There's a Light"

Side Two

1. "Blackberry Way"
2. "Cincinnati"
3. "Eighteen Carat Friend"
4. "Ain't Love Easy"
5. "Your Song"
6. "I'll Be Home"

== Personnel ==
- Eve Graham - vocals
- Lyn Paul - vocals
- Peter Doyle - vocals
- Paul Layton - vocals
- Marty Kristian - vocals
- David Mackay - Producer
- Bill Shepherd and David Mackay - Arrangements
- Keith Potger - Co-ordination
- Bill Shepherd - Orchestral director
- Mike Claydon, Andy Knight, John Pantry, Chris West - Engineers
- Other contributors: Terry Britten, Barry Guard, Graham Hall, Scott Shukat, Peter Skellern, Trevor Spencer, Alan Tarney
- Recorded at IBC Studios, London
