= We'd Like to Teach the World to Sing =

Album by The New Seekers

Studio album by The New Seekers
- Released: 1971
- Recorded: 1971
- Genre: Pop, MOR
- Length: 35:32
- Label: Elektra
- Producer: David Mackay

The New Seekers chronology
New Colours (1971)	We'd Like to Teach the World to Sing (1971)	Circles (1972)

Professional ratings
Review scores
Source	Rating
Allmusic	3.5/5 stars
Christgau's Record Guide	D+

We'd Like to Teach the World to Sing is the name given to two albums by UK pop group The New Seekers. The first of these, released in late 1971, was a repackaging of their previous album New Colours and was released in the US. The second version of the album was released in the UK and Europe in 1972 with a new line-up of tracks. Both albums however contained the song "I'd Like to Teach the World to Sing (In Perfect Harmony)".

== US version ==
Although the group had achieved success in America with their debut single, "Look What They've Done to My Song Ma", the group's following singles failed to fare as well, with the 1971 album New Colours missing the Billboard 200 completely. With the success in late 1971 of their single "I'd Like to Teach the World to Sing", however, this album was repackaged with the single included and retitled. It then became their highest charting album, peaking at #37. Of the earlier album's 12 tracks, "Move Me Lord" was omitted from this version. Other singles released were "The Nickel Song" (which peaked at #81) and "Tonight". This version of the album was released on compact disc in 2003.

=== Track listing ===
Side one

1. "Tonight" (Roy Wood) – 2:52
2. "Too Many Trips to Nowhere" (Terry Britten) – 3:00
3. "Wanderer's Song" (Hans Poulsen) – 2:42
4. "Boom Town" (Peter Doyle) – 4:20
5. "Evergreen" (Richard Kerr, Jonathan Peel) – 3:00
6. "I'd Like to Teach the World to Sing" (Bill Backer, Roger Cook, Billy Davis, Roger Greenaway) – 2:25

Side two

1. "The Nickel Song" (Melanie Safka) – 3:22
2. "Lay Me Down" (Peter Doyle) – 2:47
3. "No Man's Land" (Richard Thompson) – 2:04
4. "Sweet Louise" (Paul Layton) – 2:49
5. "Good Old Fashioned Music" (Gary Sulsh, Stuart Leathwood) – 2:53
6. "Child of Mine" (Gerry Goffin, Carole King) – 3:18

We'd Like to Teach the World to Sing (1972)

Studio album by The New Seekers
- Released: March 1972
- Recorded: 1971–1972
- Genre: Pop, MOR
- Length: 34:08
- Label: Polydor
- Producer: David Mackay

The New Seekers chronology
New Colours (1971)	We'd Like to Teach the World to Sing (1972) (1972)	Never Ending Song of Love (1972)

== UK version ==
With a line-up of newly recorded tracks, the group released an album under the same name in the UK and Europe in March 1972. As well as featuring the single "I'd Like to Teach the World to Sing", which had reached #1 in the UK, it also featured their then current single, "Beg, Steal or Borrow". This latter single was their entry into the 1972 Eurovision Song Contest, where it gained second place as well as reaching #2 in the UK singles chart. As well as this, two other songs, which they had performed in the heats were included: "One by One" and "Songs of Praise". Like its US counterpart, this album became their highest charter, peaking at #2 in the UK album charts, and remaining in the top 50 for 25 weeks.

=== Track listing ===
Side One

1. "Dance Dance Dance" (Neil Young)—2:02
2. "Georgy Girl/Ticket to Ride" (Springfield, Dale/Lennon, McCartney)—2:58
3. "I'd Like to Teach the World to Sing" (Roger Cook, Roger Greenaway, Bill Backer, Billy Davis)—2:20
4. "Changes IV" (Cat Stevens)—2:45
5. "One by One" (Mike Leander, Eddie Sego)—3:06
6. "I Can Say You're Beautiful" (Peter Doyle)—3:42

Side Two

1. "Beg, Steal or Borrow" (Tony Cole, Graeme Hall, Steve Wolfe)—2:45
2. "The World I Wish for You" (Greenaway, Cook)—2:27
3. "Wanderer's Song" (Hans Poulson)—2:42
4. "Just an Old Fashioned Love Song" (Paul Williams)—2:41
5. "Songs of Praise" (Roy Wood)—2:38
6. "Mystic Queen" (Marty Kristian)—4:02
