= Now (The New Seekers album) =

Studio album by The New Seekers
- Released: March 1973
- Genre: Pop, MOR
- Length: 37:58 (UK) / 33:06 (US)
- Label: Polydor
- Producer: Michael Lloyd, David Mackay

The New Seekers chronology
Live at the Royal Albert Hall (1972)	Now (1973)	Together (1974)

Alternative cover
- Pinball Wizards - US version of Now

Now is a 1973 album by British pop group the New Seekers. It was retitled Pinball Wizards in the US.

== Overview ==
Released in March 1973, the album coincided with the release of their latest hit single "Pinball Wizard/See Me Feel Me", which reached #16 on the UK charts. This single was a medley of two songs taken from the Who's rock opera Tommy and employed a harder-edged sound for the group, with heavy use of electric guitars and vocals more in line with a typical rock style. The Who's Pete Townshend congratulated the group on their version of the song. However, no other singles were issued from the album. Now reached #47 in the UK album charts. The New Musical Express reviewed the album on its release, and while criticising the group for their middle of the road nature, it did state: "Nobody denies their natural vocal ability, and I'll go so far as to say the harmonies are excellent".

This was to be the group's last album for a year and was the last album to feature singer-songwriter Peter Doyle, who left the group in mid-1973 to be replaced by Peter Oliver.

In the US, the album was released under the title Pinball Wizards with alternate artwork and a slightly different track listing. The title track single had become one of the group's biggest hits there, peaking at #29. This would also be the group's final single to chart. The album itself reached #190.

== Track listing (UK) ==
Side One

1. "Pinball Wizard/See Me Feel Me" (Pete Townshend)—3:23
2. "A Brand New Song" (Jeff Barry, Paul Williams)—2:55
3. "Look Look" (Marty Kristian)—2:53
4. "That's My Guy" (Merrill Osmond, Alan Osmond)—3:10
5. "Feeling" (P. Yellowstone, J. Schwartz)—3:15
6. "Utah" (Merrill Osmond)—2:17

Side Two

1. "Reaching Out for Someone" (Dick Holler)—3:00
2. "Everything Changing" (W. Cates, P. Caldwell)—3:24
3. "Time Limit" (Kristian, Peter Doyle)—3:03
4. "Rain" (José Feliciano, H. Feliciano)—3:18
5. "Somebody Somewhere" (Cook, Greenaway, Rae)—2:20
6. "Goin' Back" (Gerry Goffin, Carole King)—5:00

== Track listing (US) ==
Side One

1. "Pinball Wizard/See Me Feel Me" —3.27
2. "A Brand New Song" —2.56
3. "Look Look" —2.54
4. "That's My Guy" —3.10
5. "Feelin'" —3.14
6. "Utah" —2.16

Side Two

1. "Reaching Out for Someone" —2.59
2. "With Everything Changing" —3.24
3. "Time Limit" —3.03
4. "Somebody Somewhere" —2.20
5. "The Further We Reach Out" (Paul Cartledge, Frank Fields, Ken Ashby) —3.23

== Personnel ==
- Michael Lloyd - Producer
- David Mackay - Producer on "Look Look", "Everything Changing", "Rain", "Somebody Somewhere", "Goin' Back"
- Tommy Oliver - Arranger
- Marty Kristian - Vocals, lead vocals on "Pinball Wizard/See Me Feel Me", "Look Look", "Time Limit"
- Peter Doyle - Vocals, lead vocals on "Pinball Wizard/See Me Feel Me", "Utah", "Goin' Back", "The Further We Reach Out"
- Eve Graham - Vocals, lead vocals on "That's My Guy", "Reaching Out for Someone"
- Lyn Paul - Vocals, lead vocals on "Everything Changing"
- Paul Layton - Vocals
