= Keith Potger and the New Seekers =

Studio album by Keith Potger and The New Seekers
- Released: November 1970
- Recorded: 1970
- Genre: Pop, MOR
- Length: 33:25
- Label: Philips
- Producer: Keith Potger, Peter Roberts, David Mackay

The New Seekers chronology
The New Seekers (1970)	Keith Potger and the New Seekers (1970)	Beautiful People (1971)

Singles from Keith Potger and The New Seekers
- 1. "What Have They Done to My Song Ma" Released: 26 June 1970

Keith Potger and the New Seekers is a 1970 album by the UK-based pop group The New Seekers. It was the group's second album and their only one to feature the group's founder Keith Potger as a member.

== Overview ==
By the time of the album's release in November 1970, a new line-up of the group was in place. Joining Eve Graham and Marty Kristian were new members Lyn Paul, Peter Doyle and Paul Layton, as well as Keith Potger himself. The group had by now made its UK chart debut, the single "What Have They Done to My Song Ma", produced by David Mackay, which having reached #44 in the UK charts and - re-titled "Look What They've Done to My Song Ma" - had become a major hit in both North America (US #14/ Canada #2) - and Australia (#3). That track as well as some of the other songs had already been recorded by the earlier line-up, although continuing member Eve Graham sang lead on many of the songs. The album cover photo was taken shortly after the new line-up was in place during the group's summer season of concerts at Great Yarmouth (the picture features them standing under the town's pier).

No further singles were issued from the album and it failed to chart in the UK. The group's next album Beautiful People would be the group's first album release in English-speaking North America and also in Australia, the edition of the album released in those territories including "Look What They've Done to My Song Ma".

Potger co-wrote two songs on the album, and his former Seekers bandmate Bruce Woodley contributed one. Two songs were co-written by Rob Lovett (ex-Loved Ones) with Brain Peacock (ex-Procession).

== Track listing ==
Side One

1. "What Have They Done to My Song, Ma?" (Melanie Safka) — 3:21
2. "Follow the Wind" (Barry Gibb) — 2:24
3. "Here, There and Everywhere" (John Lennon, Paul McCartney) — 2:33
4. "Shine People Shine" (Rob Lovett, Brian Peacock) — 3:15
5. "All Right My Love" (Keith Potger, David Groom) — 2:55
6. "Roundelay" (Laurie Heath) — 3:23

Side Two

1. "It's a Beautiful Day" (Rob Lovett, Brian Peacock) — 2:37
2. "Gentle on My Mind" (John Hartford) — 2:30
3. "Anything You Might Say" (Hans Poulsen, Bruce Woodley) — 2:41
4. "Evenings Make Me Blue" (Potger, Groom) — 1:54
5. "Mrs. Robinson" (Paul Simon) — 2:52
6. "I'm a Train" (Albert Hammond, Mike Hazlewood) — 3:00
