= The New Seekers (album) =

Studio album by The New Seekers
- Released: January 1970
- Recorded: 1969
- Genre: Pop, MOR
- Length: 36:35
- Label: Philips
- Producer: Keith Potger

The New Seekers chronology
| The New Seekers (1970) | Keith Potger and the New Seekers (1970) |

Singles from The New Seekers
- 1. "Meet My Lord" Released: October 1969

The New Seekers is the debut album by UK-based pop group The New Seekers. It was released in January 1970, just a few months after the group was formed by producer Keith Potger.

== Overview ==
The New Seekers were formed in mid 1969 as a harmony group in the style of The Seekers who had recently disbanded. Formed by Keith Potger, who had been a member of The Seekers, he assembled a five-piece line-up of Laurie Heath, Chris Barrington, Marty Kristian, Eve Graham and Sally Graham. This was the line-up that recorded the debut album which was released in January 1970. The eponymous album featured a mix of cover versions and original tracks, two of which were written by member Heath and another two by Kristian. Only one single was released from the album, "Meet My Lord". Neither album nor single charted in the UK, although the group were beginning to build a reputation as a live act. A few months after this, Heath, Barrington and Sally Graham left the group, to be replaced by Peter Doyle, Paul Layton and Lyn Paul. This line-up would remain in place until May 1974, and would see the group achieve worldwide success.

== Track listing ==
Side One

1. "Meet My Lord" (Jonathan Kelly) — 3:00
2. "Angel of the Morning" (Chip Taylor) — 3:55
3. "Betty Brown" (Georg Hultgreen) / "Zip a Dee Doo Dah" (Allie Wrubel, Ray Gilbert) — 2:58
4. "Zarzis" (Laurie Heath) — 2:50
5. "Too Much of Nothing" (Bob Dylan) 2:35
6. "Illinois" (Alex Spyropoulos, Patrick Campbell-Lyons) — 3:30

Side Two

1. "Rhythm of Life" (Dorothy Fields, Cy Coleman) — 3:00
2. "Not as Good as the Real Thing" (Heath) — 3:05
3. "Night in the City" (Joni Mitchell) — 2:40
4. "Hello Again" (Marty Kristian) — 2:35
5. "Something's Gotten Hold of My Heart" (Roger Cook, Roger Greenaway) — 3:40
6. "One More Sunny Day" (Kristian) — 2:47
