= Farewell Album =

Studio album by The New Seekers
- Released: August 1974
- Studio: Wessex Sound Studios, Sarm Studios, Indigo Sound Studios, Central Sound Studios & IBC Studios (London)
- Genre: Pop, MOR
- Length: 34:43
- Label: Polydor
- Producer: Tommy Oliver, Tony Macaulay, David Mackay

The New Seekers chronology
Together (1974)	Farewell Album (1974)	Together Again (1976)

Singles from Farewell Album
- 1. "Sing Hallelujah" Released: 7 June 1974

Farewell Album is the final album released by The New Seekers in their early 1970s hit-making line up. Released in 1974, it is also the group's last release on Polydor Records.

== Overview ==
In early 1974, despite being at the peak of their success, both female members Eve Graham and Lyn Paul had expressed their wish to leave the group. This was against the terms of their contract (which allowed for only one member to leave at a time), so came the announcement that the group were to split entirely. They released another single and album (both top 20 hits) before they performed their final shows in May.

They had however recorded a number of songs for Polydor before their disbanding and the label issued these as Farewell Album in August 1974 - three months after the group had ended. Two of the twelve tracks had been earlier recordings however. One single was released from the album, called "Sing Hallelujah". The single stalled outside the official top 50 in the UK at No.65, and as the album received no promotion from the group, it similarly failed to chart. Farewell Album received a favourable review from Disc magazine, commenting on the fact that 10 of the 12 tracks feature female leads, while founder member Marty Kristian features on lead for just two of the songs.

== Track listing ==
Side One

1. "Sing Hallelujah" (Keith Potger, Tony Macaulay)—3:06
2. "Inspiration" (Paul Williams, Kenneth Ascher)—2:34
3. "All I Wanna Do" (Sue Shifrin)—2:37
4. "Everybody's Song" (Marty Kristian)—2:33
5. "Somebody Warm Like Me" (Macaulay)—3:21
6. "Old Fashioned Song" (Tommy Oliver)—2:44

Side Two

1. "All Pull Together Kind of World" (Macaulay, Geoff Stephens)—2:43
2. "Love and Sunshine" (Oliver)—3:03
3. "Perfect Love" (Williams)—3:03
4. "I Wanna Be the Star of the Show" (Mackay, Trevor Peacock)—2:56
5. "Sad Song" (Kristian)—3:21
6. "Oh My Joe" (Macaulay, Roger Greenaway)—2:42

== Personnel ==
- Eve Graham - Vocals
- Lyn Paul - Vocals
- Marty Kristian - Guitar, vocals
- Paul Layton - Bass, backing vocals
- Peter Oliver - Guitar, backing vocals
- Tony Macaulay and Tommy Oliver - Production
- David Mackay - Production on tracks 9 and 10
- Recorded at Wessex Sound Studios, Sarm Studios, Indigo Sound Studios, Central Sound Studios & IBC Studios
