= Live at the Royal Albert Hall (The New Seekers album) =

Live album by The New Seekers
- Released: November 1972
- Recorded: 1972
- Venue: Royal Albert Hall, London
- Genre: Pop, MOR
- Length: 68:32
- Label: Polydor
- Producer: David Mackay

The New Seekers chronology
Circles (1972)	Live at the Royal Albert Hall (1972)	Now (1973)

Live at the Royal Albert Hall is a 1972 double-album by British pop group The New Seekers. The album was released in November, having been recorded some months earlier.

No singles were released from the album, although a new (studio) single was released at the same time, "Come Softly To Me". The album failed to chart in the UK, their first album for two years not to do so. The album was released in a gatefold sleeve and included a cardboard 3D model of the group on stage.

In the US, the album was released in 1973 as a single-disc compilation, reducing the number of tracks from 22 to 11. It was re-titled The History of the New Seekers and released on MGM Records.

== Track listing ==
Side One

1. "There's a Light" (Hans Poulson)—1:58
2. "One" (Harry Nilsson)—2:53
3. "Look What They've Done To My Song Ma" (Melanie Safka)—3:08
4. (Marty Introduces the New Seekers) "Georgy Girl" / "Ticket to Ride" (Tom Springfield, Jim Dale / John Lennon, Paul McCartney)—4:45
5. "Never Ending Song of Love" (Delaney / Bramlett)—2:32

Side Two

1. "Fire and Rain" / "My Sweet Lord" (James Taylor / George Harrison)—3:05
2. "When I Was Small" (M. Shekter)—4:18
3. "Nickel Song" (Melanie Safka)—3:02
4. (Peter introduces one of his own songs) "I Can Say You're Beautiful" (Peter Doyle)—5:19
5. (Paul and his Napoleon character) "I'd Like to Teach the World to Sing" (Backer, Davis, Roger Greenaway, Roger Cook)—3:17

Side Three

1. "I'm a Train" (Albert Hammond, Mike Hazlewood)—1:26
2. "Circles" (Harry Chapin)—3:59
3. "Blackberry Way" (Roy Wood)—2:01
4. "Beautiful People" (Melanie Safka)—3:29
5. "Good Old Fashioned Music" (Gary Sulsh, Stuart Leathwood)—2:44
6. "I'll Be Home" (Randy Newman)—3:02

Side Four

1. "Tonight" (Roy Wood)—2:20
2. "Angel of the Morning" (Chip Taylor)—3:24
3. "Get Ourselves Together" / "Someday" (Bonnie Bramlett, Carl Radle / J. Allison, Bonnie Bramlett, D. Gilmore)—1:43
4. "When There's No Love Left" (Brian Peacock / Rob Lovett)—2:55
5. (Lyn gets to do her own thing) "I'm a Nut" (Leroy Pullins)—4:26
6. "Beg, Steal or Borrow" (Tony Cole, Graeme Hall, Steve Woolfe)—2:46

== US track listing ==
Side One

1. "There's a Light"
2. "One"
3. "Look What They've Done to My Song Ma"
4. "Georgy Girl" / "Ticket to Ride"
5. "Never Ending Song of Love"

Side Two

1. "I'd Like to Teach the World to Sing"
2. "Nickel Song"
3. "Circles"
4. "Beg, Steal or Borrow"
5. "Beautiful People"
6. "Good Old Fashioned Music"
