= Together Again (The New Seekers album) =

Studio album by The New Seekers
- Released: 12 November 1976
- Recorded: 1976
- Genre: Pop, MOR
- Length: 43:19
- Label: CBS Records
- Producer: Phil Coulter

The New Seekers chronology
Farewell Album (1974)	Together Again (1976)	Anthem - One Day In Every Week (1978)

Singles from Together Again
- 1. "It's so Nice (To Have You Home)" Released: 18 June 1976; 2. "I Wanna Go Back" Released: 5 November 1976

Together Again is the eleventh album by British pop group The New Seekers. Released in 1976, it was the first album by the newly reformed group, which now contained two new members. The album was released on CBS Records and featured the hit singles "It's so Nice (To Have You Home)" and "I Wanna Go Back".

== Background ==
The New Seekers had split in 1974, following a run of high success in the first five years of the decade. Two years later, they decided to reform without members Lyn Paul and Peter Oliver. The new line-up comprised three members of the hit-making group; Eve Graham, Marty Kristian and Paul Layton along with new members Kathy Ann Rae and Danny Finn. They made their debut at the Theatre Royal, Drury Lane on 16 May 1976.

The first single released by the group was the upbeat pop song "It's so Nice (To Have You Home)" in June 1976. The single entered the UK singles chart and peaked at No.44 during a four-week run. A second single was released in November, "I Wanna Go Back", which took nearly three months to chart, but finally did in late January 1977, peaking at No.25. The album was released on 12 November 1976 on CBS Records, but failed to chart. It was mainly produced by Phil Coulter and Bill Martin, with some songs produced by Ron Richards and Ossie Byrne. Member Layton said of the collaboration with Coulter and Martin (who were major hit makers at the time), "our management company teamed us up with Martin and Coulter for production, so we were largely in their hands as far as the selection of singles was concerned."

The songs included on the album were a mix of original compositions and covers of contemporary hits such as "Don't Go Breaking My Heart" and "A Little Bit More". Three of the songs were written by group members Kristian, Layton and Finn. Member Eve Graham said "the difference between this version [of the group] and the previous version was that Marty and Paul wanted to write and produce the songs, so in my opinion we were never working at the same level of quality. It was fine for a while but as far as I was concerned there was no longevity in it." Also included was a cover of Dolly Parton's song "The Seeker", which became a mainstay of their live shows. The album ends with a medley of seven songs, namely "I'm a Song (Sing Me)", "I Believe in Music", "I've Got the Music in Me", "Listen to the Music", "Dance to the Music", "Money Makes the World Go Round" and "Music".

The album was released on vinyl, cassette and finally on compact disc in 2009 in a double-pack with their next album and again in 2022 as part of a box-set of latter-day releases.

== Track listing ==
Side One

1. "I Wanna Go Back" (Bill Martin / Phil Coulter) - 3:58
2. "You Never Can Tell" (Marty Kristian / Paul Layton) - 2:40
3. "It's so Nice (To Have You Home)" (Martin / Coulter) - 3:50
4. "You Make Me Feel Like a Woman" (Danny Finn / Kristian) - 3:44
5. "A Little Bit More" (Bobby Gosh) - 3:27
6. "Party Time" (Martin / Coulter) - 3:42

Side Two

1. "The Seeker" (Dolly Parton) - 2:56
2. "Scorn Not His Simplicity" (Martin / Coulter) - 4:31
3. "Don't Go Breaking My Heart" (Ann Orson / Carte Blanche) - 4:42
4. "Country Lovin'" (Kristian / Layton) - 3:49
5. "Music Medley" (Greenfield / Sedaka / Davis / Boshell / Johnston / Stewart / Kander / Ebb / Miles) - 6:00

== Personnel ==
- The New Seekers - vocals
- Phil Coulter - producer on tracks 1, 5, 6, 7, 8, 9, 11
- Ron Richards - producer on track 3
- Ossie Byrne with Marty Kristian, Paul Layton and Danny Finn - producer on tracks 2, 4, 10
- Bill Martin - associate producer on tracks 1, 5, 6, 7, 8, 9, 11
