= Together (The New Seekers album) =

Studio album by The New Seekers
- Released: March 1974
- Recorded: 1973–74
- Genres: Pop, MOR
- Length: 42:23
- Label: Polydor
- Producers: Michael Lloyd, Tommy Oliver, Tony Macaulay

The New Seekers chronology
Now (1973)	Together (1974)	Farewell Album (1974)

Singles from Together
- 1. "The Greatest Song I Ever Heard" Released: July 1973 (US/Canada only); 2. "You Won't Find Another Fool Like Me" Released: 16 November 1973; 3. "I Get a Little Sentimental Over You" Released: 1 March 1974

Together is a 1974 album by British pop group The New Seekers. It features the No. 1 single "You Won't Find Another Fool Like Me" and the top five follow-up "I Get a Little Sentimental Over You". It was the last album the group released before a much-publicised split.

== Overview ==
Following the release of their previous album Now, the group remained busy working in America for much of 1973. This included promotion for their hit single "Pinball Wizard — See Me Feel Me", undertaking a season of concerts in Las Vegas and a live tour with Liza Minnelli. A number of singles were released in the UK during this time, but were met with less success than they had achieved in 1972; the last of these, "We've Got to Do It Now" failing to chart at all. By mid-1973, member Peter Doyle had left the group and was swiftly replaced by Peter Oliver. Late in 1973, the group returned to the studio to record their next album as well as another single, "You Won't Find Another Fool Like Me". This saw member Lyn Paul take lead vocals for the first time on one of their singles and by Christmas had become their biggest hit for over a year. In January 1974, the single spent one week at the top of the UK charts, becoming the group's second number one.

In March 1974 the album Together was released — their first in a year. It contained their recent hit, but none of the other 1973 releases, which had not featured on any studio album, although it did include an American single "The Greatest Song I've Ever Heard", which had been released several months earlier while Doyle was still with the group. The album coincided with the news that the group had decided to split. Originally, Eve Graham had expressed her wish to go solo, while Paul also decided that she wanted to leave. The story was carried in newspaper headlines, with many suggesting that the real reason was that despite their success, the members of the group were receiving little financial reward. Meanwhile, the album gained markedly improved sales over their previous two and rose to No.12 in the UK charts — their second highest position in the album charts and remained in the top 50 for nine weeks. Unlike their previous releases, this album didn't feature any compositions by the group themselves, but was made up of original tracks interspersed with cover versions covering a variety of genres. Included were covers of The Beatles songs "Here, There and Everywhere" and "With a Little Help from My Friends", Buck Owens' "Crying Time" and Blue Mink's "Melting Pot" — a song which Graham had been offered to record in 1969. A review in Disc magazine saw favourable mention of a number of tracks, with the reviewer commenting that "there's no denying that what they do tackle is seldom less than well-executed and often considerably better than that".

Around the same time as the album, another single was released; "I Get a Little Sentimental Over You". Also featuring Paul on lead vocals, this too became a success by peaking at No.5 in the UK chart. To coincide with their split, the group performed a farewell tour. The final show was performed in May 1974. One further album was released a few months later along with a single, but with the band no longer active, neither made the charts.

The Together album was released for the first time on CD by the Cherry Red Records' off-shoot 7T's in April 2018 in a double-pack with the following album; it featured four bonus tracks.

== Track listing ==
Side One

1. "Friends Medley" ("Friends" / "With a Little Help from My Friends") (Mark Klingman, Buzzy Linhart / John Lennon, Paul McCartney) 2:31
2. "You're the One" (Robert Morrison) 2:45
3. "Cryin' Time" (Buck Owens) 2:46
4. "The Greatest Song I've Ever Heard" (Dick Holler) 3:05
5. "I Get a Little Sentimental Over You" (Tony Macaulay, Geoff Stephens) 2:58
6. "Brother Love's Travelling Salvation Show" (Neil Diamond) 3:26
7. "You Won't Find Another Fool Like Me" (Tony Macaulay, Geoff Stephens) 3:13

Side Two

1. "Melting Pot" (Roger Cook, Roger Greenaway) 3:37
2. "Fire and Rain Medley" ("Fire and Rain" / "My Sweet Lord" / "Day by Day") ( James Taylor / George Harrison / Stephen Schwartz) 3:45
3. "Here, There and Everywhere" (John Lennon, Paul McCartney) 2:34
4. "Brand New Day" (Oliver, Gordon) 2:32
5. "Come on World" (Mike Hugg) 2:56
6. "Vado Via" (Riccardi, Alberteli, Oliver, Owen) 3:18
7. "Dedicated to the One I Love" (Bass, Pauling) 2:57

CD re-issue bonus tracks

1. "Goodbye is Just Another Word" (Lobo) 2:57
2. "We've Got to Do It Now" (Cook, Greenaway) 2:43
3. "Song for You and Me" (Cotton, Kipner, Lloyd) 2:52
4. "Down by the River" (Hammond, Hazelwood) 2:56

== Charts ==
Chart (1974)	Position
Australia (Kent Music Report)	44

== Personnel ==
- Eve Graham - vocals
- Lyn Paul - vocals
- Marty Kristian - guitar, vocals
- Paul Layton - guitar, vocals
- Peter Oliver - guitar, vocals
- Michael Lloyd - producer on tracks 1, 2, 3, 4, 6, 8, 9, 10, 12, 14
- Tommy Oliver - producer on tracks 7, 11, 13; arranger on tracks 1, 2, 3, 4, 6, 8, 9, 10, 12, 14
- Tommy Oliver and Tony Macaulay - producer on track 5
- Gerry Shury - arranger on tracks 5, 7, 11, 13
