= Anthem – One Day in Every Week =

Studio album by The New Seekers
- Released: September 1978
- Recorded: 1977–1978
- Genre: Pop; MOR
- Length: 35:05
- Label: CBS Records
- Producer: David Mackay

The New Seekers chronology
| Together Again (1976) | Anthem – One Day in Every Week (1978) | Tell Me (1982) |

Singles from Anthem – One Day in Every Week
- 1. "Flashback" Released: 6 January 1978; 2. "Do You Wanna Make Love" Released: 31 March 1978; 3. "Anthem (One Day in Every Week)" Released: 9 June 1978

Anthem – One Day in Every Week is the twelfth studio album by British pop group The New Seekers. The album was released in September 1978 on CBS Records and featured the hit single "Anthem (One Day in Every Week)". It remains the final commercially released studio album by the group in the UK.

== Background ==
Following the group's reformation in 1976, The New Seekers had experienced some success in this new incarnation, including two hit singles, although had not enjoyed the same level of success that they had seen in the first half of the decade. In 1978 they scored their third - and biggest - hit single in the form of "Anthem (One Day In Every Week)", which was released in June. The single reached the charts in July and peaked at No.21 the following month, remaining on the chart for 10 weeks. The song featured on Top of the Pops three times during July and August. It became one of the group's most highly regarded works with The Encyclopedia of Rock hailing it as "an outstanding a cappella record". Member Eve Graham said of the song "other producers tend to be short-sighted by the name The New Seekers, [David Mackay] looked for songs he felt were hits and not 'oh, it's got to be in this kind of category'".

The album was released in September and also featured two earlier single releases, "Flashback" and "Do You Wanna Make Love". It was produced by David Mackay and featured songs from a variety of songwriters, and one of them written by the group themselves, the closing track "I've Got Your Number". The album failed to chart and remains their final album. Within a few weeks of the release, members Eve Graham and Danny Finn left the band. They had become romantically involved and decided to form a touring act as a duo. The New Seekers recruited new members and continued to release new singles, but none found chart success.

Anthem – One Day in Every Week was released on vinyl, cassette and finally on compact disc in 2009 in a double-pack with their previous album and again in 2022 as part of a box-set of latter-day releases.

== Track listing ==
Side one

1. "Do You Wanna Make Love" (Peter McCann) — 3:46
2. "We Grew Up On Rock 'n' Roll" (Terry Dempsey) — 2:50
3. "Anthem (One Day in Every Week)" (Brian Peacock / Mick Rogers) — 3.12
4. "The Singer" (Chris Andrews) — 3:30
5. "Out of Love with Love" (Dominic Bugatti / Frank Musker) — 4:55

Side two

1. "You Got Me Running" (Parker McGee) — 2:40
2. "Flashback" (Digby Richards) — 3:18
3. "Ray of Sunshine" (Mike D'Abo / Mike Smith) — 3:07
4. "High in a Singles Bar" (Dennis Tracy) — 3:59
5. "I've Got Your Number" (Danny Finn / Marty Kristian / Paul Layton) — 2:48
