= New Colours =

Studio album by The New Seekers
- Released: September 1971
- Recorded: 1971
- Genre: Pop, MOR
- Length: 36:16 (UK), 36:18 (US)
- Label: Polydor
- Producer: David Mackay

The New Seekers chronology
Beautiful People (1971)	New Colours (1971)	We'd Like to Teach the World to Sing (1971)

New Colours is a 1971 album by UK pop group The New Seekers. It was their first album released on the Polydor label.

== Overview ==
In the UK, The New Seekers had failed to gain mainstream success until mid-1971 when the single "Never Ending Song of Love" reached #2 in the charts. This album was released while the single was still in the top 20, but that song had actually appeared on the group's previous album, Beautiful People. Possibly due to this, New Colours failed to chart at the time of release. Some months later however, as the group found themselves at #1 with the single "I'd Like to Teach the World to Sing," this album then managed to break into the UK top 50 by peaking at #40 and spending four weeks on the chart. Only one single was released from this album, the uptempo track "Good Old Fashioned Music," but didn't find success.

New Colours was released in the US with a slightly different track list. Two singles were released there; "The Nickel Song" and "Tonight." The album initially failed to chart, but some months later it was re-released under a new title, We'd Like to Teach the World to Sing. With one track added (and "Move Me Lord" omitted) it became their biggest-selling album there by peaking at #37.

Reviewer John Wells writing for the New Musical Express said of New Colours: "A good album, well produced and...superb harmonies from one and all." The album was released on vinyl, cassette and 8-Track cartridge. The songs were later released on Compact Disc in 2003.

== Track listing (UK) ==
Side One

1. "Doggone My Soul (How I Love Them Old Songs)" (Mickey Newbury) 2.58
2. "Evergreen" (Richard Kerr, Jonathan Peel) 2.58
3. "Something in the Way He Moves" (James Taylor) 3.04
4. "Sweet Louise" (Paul Layton) 2.50
5. "Good Old Fashioned Music" (Gary Sulsh, Stuart Leathwood) 2.54
6. "Move Me Lord" (Peter Doyle) 3.05

Side Two

1. "No Man's Land" (Richard Thompson) 2.02
2. "Child of Mine" (Gerry Goffin, Carole King) 3.19
3. "Tonight" (Roy Wood) 2.54
4. "Lay Me Down" (Doyle) 2.46
5. "Too Many Trips to Nowhere" (Terry Britten) 3.02
6. "Boom Town" (Doyle) 4.24

=== Track listing (US) ===
Side One

1. "Tonight"
2. "Too Many Trips to Nowhere"
3. "Wanderer's Song" (Hans Poulsen) 2:42
4. "Boom-Town"
5. "Evergreen"
6. "Move Me Lord"

Side Two

1. "The Nickel Song" (Melanie Safka) 3:22
2. "Lay Me Down"
3. "No Man's Land"
4. "Sweet Louise"
5. "Good Old Fashioned Music"
6. "Child of Mine"
