= Circles (The New Seekers album) =

Studio album by The New Seekers
- Released: September 1972
- Recorded: 1972
- Genre: Pop, MOR
- Length: 41:35 (UK), 34:56 (US)
- Label: Polydor
- Producer: David Mackay

The New Seekers chronology
We'd Like to Teach the World to Sing (1972)	Circles (1972)	Live at the Royal Albert Hall (1972)

Alternative cover
- Circles (Elektra release)

Circles is a 1972 album by UK pop group The New Seekers. It was the group's sixth album and released at the peak of their success. In the UK the album was notably released in a cut-out circular sleeve.

The album Circles released by Elektra (EKS 75034) has different artwork and quite different track listing.

== Overview ==
Released in September 1972, The New Seekers were riding the peak of their career following three recent top two singles and #2 album in the UK. Circles also saw success in its title track single, which reached #4 in the UK singles chart, becoming one of their biggest-selling releases and remaining on the chart for 16 weeks. It is also popularly seen as their finest song according to the group's fans. The album was released soon after and featured a number of notable cover versions, such as "Morning Has Broken" by Cat Stevens, "Blowin' in the Wind" by Bob Dylan and "Song Sung Blue" by Neil Diamond. Original songs were written by group members Marty Kristian, Peter Doyle and Paul Layton but no further singles were issued from the album. The album itself peaked at #23 in the UK album charts and remained on the top 50 for five weeks. While the album was released in the UK in a special circular sleeve, in the US it was issued in a standard square sleeve featuring alternative artwork. The track listing also differed in that many songs were taken from the previous UK album We'd Like to Teach the World to Sing.

Three singles were released from the album; "Beg, Steal or Borrow", "Circles" and "Dance Dance Dance" which reached #81, #87 and #84 respectively in the Billboard Hot 100. The album reached US #166, a drop from their top 40-charting last album.

== Track listing (UK) ==
Side One

1. "Circles" (Harry Chapin) 4.30
2. "I Saw the Light" (Todd Rundgren) 3.03
3. "Day by Day" (Stephen Schwartz) 4.12
4. "Morning Has Broken" (Cat Stevens) 3.22
5. "Idaho" (Marty Kristian, Paul Layton) 1.46
6. "Unwithered Rose" (Peter Doyle) 4.30

Side Two

1. "Holy Rollin'" (Cynthia Weil, Barry Mann) 2.30
2. "Beautiful" (Carole King) 2.34
3. "Blowin' in the Wind" (Bob Dylan) 4.16
4. "Song Sung Blue" (Neil Diamond) 2.30
5. "I Don't Want to Lose You" (Hans Poulsen) 2.33
6. "Reap What You Sow" (Marty Kristian) 4.29
7. "I'll Be Your Song" (Peter Doyle) 1.20

== Track listing (US) ==
Side One

1. "Dance Dance Dance" (Neil Young) 2.02
2. "Changes IV" (Cat Stevens) 2.45
3. "I Can Say You're Beautiful" (Peter Doyle) 3.42
4. "Holy Rollin'" (Barry Mann) 2.30
5. "Just an Old Fashioned Love Song" (Paul Williams) 2.47
6. "Mystic Queen" (Marty Kristian) 4.00

Side Two

1. "Beg, Steal or Borrow" (Hall, Wolfe, Cole) 2.48
2. "A Perfect Love" (Williams) 2.28
3. "The World I Wish for You" (Cook, Greenaway, Backer, Davis) 2.18
4. "Out on the Edge of Beyond" (Bendall, Mike Sammes) 2.18
5. "Jean's Little Street Cafe" (Fugain, Aufray, Buggy, Best) 2.48
6. "Circles" (Harry Chapin) 4.30
