= What a Bitch Is Love =

Single by Marcia Hines

from the album Take It from the Boys
- B-side: "It Don't Take Much"
- Released: October 1981
- Genre: Disco, pop rock
- Length: 3:29
- Label: Midnight Records, Friends Records
- Songwriters: Barry Blue, Paul Greedus
- Producer: David Mackay

Marcia Hines singles chronology
"Your Love Still Brings Me to My Knees" (1981)	"What a Bitch Is Love" (1981)	"Many Rivers to Cross" (1981)

"What a Bitch Is Love" is a song recorded by American-Australian singer Marcia Hines.Written by Barry Blue and Paul Greedus and produced by David Mackay, the song was released in October 1981 as the second single from Hines' fifth studio album, Take It from the Boys (1981).

== Track listing ==
Australian 7" single (NiTE 002) / Dutch 7" Single (FR 12019)

1. "What a Bitch Is Love" (Barry Blue, Paul Greedus) – 3:29
2. "It Don't Take Much" (Douglas Foxworthy, Glen Ballard, Kerry Chater) – 3:31

== Charts ==
=== Weekly charts ===
Chart (1981)	Peak position
Australia (Kent Music Report)	51
