= In My Life (Cilla Black album) =

Studio album by Cilla Black
- Released: 7 June 1974
- Recorded: 1973/1974 at Abbey Road Studios, London and Morgan Studios, London
- Genres: Soft rock, adult contemporary
- Label: EMI
- Producer: David Mackay

Cilla Black chronology
Day by Day with Cilla (1973)	In My Life (1974)	It Makes Me Feel Good (1976)

Singles from In My Life
- 1. "Baby We Can't Go Wrong" Released: January 1974; 2. "I'll Have to Say I Love You, in a Song" Released: May 1974

In My Life is the title of Cilla Black's eighth solo studio album released in 1974 by EMI. The album was her first to be produced by Australian producer David Mackay who had notched up chart hits for Cliff Richard and The New Seekers.

Mackay's remit for the project was to develop a new sound for Black which would keep her music in tune with the current pop market. He wanted to move away from her trademark power-ballad orchestrations and produce a soft rock record in the vein of "Step Inside Love" which he considered to be her finest work.

The lead single "Baby We Can't Go Wrong" reached #36 on the UK Singles Chart. It was also used as the opening theme tune to season 7 of Black's BBC TV variety show Cilla.

== Re-Release ==
On 7 September 2009, EMI Records released a special edition of the album exclusively to digital download. This re-issue featured all of the album's original recordings re-mastered by Abbey Road Studios from original 1/4" stereo master tapes. A digital booklet containing original album artwork, detailed track information and rare photographs was made available from iTunes with purchases of the entire album re-issue.

== Track listing ==
Side one

1. "Flashback" (O'Day, Wayne) - 3:19
2. "I'll Have to Say I Love You, in a Song" (Jim Croce) - 2:36
3. "Everything I Own" (David Gates) - 3:05
4. "Baby We Can't Go Wrong" (Dunning) - 2:53
5. "Someone" (Cole, Wolfe) - 2:48
6. "Daydreamer" (Dempsey) - 2:12

Side two

1. "In My Life" (John Lennon, Paul McCartney) - 2:30
2. "Never Run Out (Of You)" (Ashby, Colwell, Colwell) - 2:25
3. "Let Him In" (Benson) - 2:21
4. "The Air That I Breathe" (Hammond, Hazlewood) - 3:45
5. "Like a Song" (Park) - 2:23
6. "I Believed It All" (Un Sorriso E Poi Perdonami) (Black, Bigazzi, Bela) - 2:52

== Personnel ==
- Cilla Black - lead vocals
- Produced and arranged by David Mackay
- Engineered by Roger Quested and Tony Clark
- Trevor Spencer, Barrie Guard - drums
- Ray Cooper, Barrie Guard - percussion
- Alan Tarney - bass
- Pianography - Cliff Hall, Dave MacRae
- Terry Britten, Kevin Peek - guitar
- Gordon Huntley - steel guitar
- David Mackay - Moog synthesizer
- Terry Britten, Alan Tarney, David Mackay, The Breakaways, Anna Peacock - backing vocals
- Orchestration led by Pat Halling
- John Kelly - cover photography
