= Your Love Still Brings Me to My Knees =

Single by Marcia Hines

from the album Take it From the Boys
- A-side: "Your Love Still Brings Me to My Knees"
- Released: July 1981
- Genre: Disco, pop rock
- Length: 3:30
- Label: Midnight Records, Friends Records
- Songwriters: Bobby Wood, Roger Cook
- Producer: David Mackay

Marcia Hines singles chronology
"Ooh Child" / "Dance Fool Dance" (1980)	"Your Love Still Brings Me to My Knees" (1981)	"What a Bitch is Love" / "It Don't Take Much" (1981)

"Your Love Still Brings Me to My Knees" is a song originally recorded by British artist Dusty Springfield and released in the UK in early 1980. It was her last single release on the Mercury label, but failed to reach the UK charts, despite heavy radio airplay. It was later recorded by American-Australian singer Marcia Hines. The song was written by Bobby Wood, Roger Cook and produced by David Mackay and released in July 1981 as the lead single from Hines' fifth studio album, Take it From the Boys (1981). It became Hines' sixth (and, to date, final) Top 10 single in Australia. Later versions were recorded by The Duncans also in 1981 and Leo Sayer in 1982.

== Marcia Hines Track listing ==
Australian 7" Single (NiTE 001)

1. "Your Love Still Brings Me to My Knees" (B. Wood, R. Cook) - 3:30
2. "'Till It's Too Late" (C. Hull, M. Hines)

Dutch 7" Single (FRS 009)

1. "Your Love Still Brings Me to My Knees" - 5:20
2. "All The Things We Do When We're Lonely" (Dean Pitchford, Tom Snow) - 3:50

== Charts ==
=== Weekly charts ===
Chart (1981)	Peak position
Australia (Kent Music Report)	10
Belgium (Ultratop 50 Flanders)	7
Netherlands (Dutch Top 40)	8
Netherlands (Single Top 100)	6

=== Year-end charts ===
Chart (1981)	Position
Australian (Kent Music Report)	74
Netherlands (Dutch Top 40)	73
Netherlands (Single Top 100)	77
