= Day by Day with Cilla =

Studio album by Cilla Black
- Released: January 1973
- Recorded: 1971/1972 at Abbey Road Studios, London
- Genres: Pop, Rock opera, Folk
- Label: Parlophone/EMI
- Producer: George Martin

Cilla Black chronology
Images (1971)	Day by Day with Cilla (1973)	In My Life (1974)

Day by Day with Cilla is the title of Cilla Black's seventh solo studio album released in 1973 by Parlophone Records. The album marked the end of a significant era in Black's recording career as it was her last project to be produced by George Martin, who had worked on all of her recordings since her 1963 debut. It was also Black's final record released on the Parlophone Records label.

Music arranger on three of the songs, "Thank Heavens I've Got You", "I've Still Got My Heart Joe", and "I Hate Sunday", was Chris Gunning. Alan Hawkshaw, later composer of the music for Channel 4's Countdown, played piano for these songs. Gunning described working on these songs as some of the most enjoyable work he had ever done and singled out "Thank Heavens I've Got You" as his favourite of the tracks he worked on.

This album was also Black's first to be produced under the guise of her own production company Cilla Black Limited.

== Re-Release ==
On 7 September 2009, EMI Records released a special edition of the album exclusively to digital download. The re-issue featured all of the album's original recordings re-mastered by Abbey Road Studios from original 1/4" stereo master tapes. A digital booklet containing original album artwork, detailed track information and rare photographs was also made available from iTunes with purchases of the entire album re-issue.

== Track listing ==
Side one

1. "Without You" (Pete Ham, Tom Evans)
2. "Thank Heavens I've Got You" (John Farrar, Best)
3. "Help Me Jesus" (Lesley Duncan)
4. "The Long and Winding Road" (John Lennon, Paul McCartney)
5. "I Hate Sunday" (Belle Gonzalez)
6. "I Don't Know How to Love Him" (Tim Rice, Andrew Lloyd Webber)

Side B

1. "Day by Day" (Stephen Schwartz)
2. "I've Still Got My Heart Joe" (Roger Cook, Roger Greenaway, Tony Macaulay)
3. "Sleep Song" (Graham Nash)
4. "Gypsys Tramps and Thieves" (Robert Stone)
5. "Winterwood" (Don McLean)
6. "Oh My Love" (John Lennon, Yoko Ono)

== Credits ==
Personnel

- Lead vocals by Cilla Black
- Produced by George Martin
- Album cover photograph by Dave Magnus
