= Images (Cilla Black album) =

Studio album by Cilla Black
- Released: May 1971
- Genres: Pop, Adult Contemporary
- Labels: Parlophone/EMI; PCS7128 (stereo)
- Producer: George Martin

Cilla Black chronology
| Sweet Inspiration (1970) | Images (1971) | Day by Day with Cilla (1973) |

Images is the title of Cilla Black's sixth solo studio album released in 1971 by Parlophone Records. It was notably Black's penultimate album project with George Martin and it also was a change in direction for Black with a more contemporary pop sound.

== Re-Release ==
On 7 September 2009, EMI Records release a special edition of the album exclusively to digital download. This re-issue features all of the album's original recordings re-mastered by Abbey Road Studios from original 1/4" stereo master tapes. A digital booklet containing original album artwork, detailed track information and rare photographs will be available from iTunes with purchases of the entire album re-issue.

== Track listing ==
Side one

1. "Faded Images" (Kenny Lynch, Tony Hicks)
2. "Junk" (Paul McCartney)
3. "Your Song" (Elton John, Bernie Taupin)
4. "Just Friends" (Rod Edwards, Roger Hand)
5. "It's Different Now" (Clive Westlake)
6. "First of May" (Barry Gibb, Robin Gibb, Maurice Gibb)

Side B

1. "(They Long to Be) Close to You" (Burt Bacharach, Hal David)
2. "Rainbow" (William Campbell, Thomas McAleese)
3. "Make It with You" (David Gates)
4. "Our Brand New World" (Bobby Willis, Clive Westlake)
5. "Sad Sad Song" (Roger Cook, Roger Greenaway)
6. "Bridge Over Troubled Water" (Paul Simon)

== Credits ==
Personnel

- Lead Vocals by Cilla Black
- Produced by George Martin
- Album Cover Photograph by David Nutter
