= If You Can Put That in a Bottle =

Song by Peter Doyle
- Language: English
- Released: 1967
- Genre: Popular music
- Songwriter: Billy Meshel

"If You Can Put That in a Bottle" is a 1967 song by Wilbur Meshel performed by Peter Doyle.

Italian singer Bobby Solo recorded the song with Italian lyrics as "Una granita al limone" in 1968.

Swedish singer Lill Lindfors released a Swedish version, "En man i byrån", with lyrics by Peter Himmelstrand in 1969. With the song, she scored a Svensktoppen hit for 14 weeks between 7 December-18 March 1970, topping the chart. For many years, Lill Lindfors refused to perform the song, since many people thought of it as a dildo-metaphor.

Swedish singer Agnetha Fältskog recorded the song with German lyrics as "Ein kleiner Mann in einer Flasche" and released it as a single on the West German market in 1970.
