= Power to All Our Friends =

1973 single by Cliff Richard

- Cover of the German release

Single by Cliff Richard
- B-side: "Come Back Billie Jo"
- Released: 9 March 1973
- Recorded: 28 December 1972
- Studio: EMI Studios, London
- Genre: Pop rock
- Length: 3:01
- Label: EMI
- Songwriters: Guy Fletcher; Doug Flett
- Producer: David McKay

Cliff Richard singles chronology
"A Brand New Song" (1972)	"Power to All Our Friends" (1973)	"Help It Along" (1973)

Eurovision Song Contest 1973 entry
- Country: United Kingdom
- Artist: Cliff Richard
- Language: English
- Composer: Guy Fletcher
- Lyricist: Doug Flett
- Conductor: David McKay

Finals performance
- Final result: 3rd
- Final points: 123

Entry chronology
- ◄ "Beg, Steal or Borrow" (1972)
- "Long Live Love" (1974) ►

Official performance video
- "Power to All Our Friends" on YouTube

"Power to All Our Friends" is a song by Cliff Richard which was chosen as the British entry to the Eurovision Song Contest 1973, by a postal vote which was decided by BBC viewers after Richard performed six contending songs on A Song For Europe, featured on Cilla Black's BBC1 Saturday evening show Cilla. The runner-up song was "Come Back Billie Jo", written by Mitch Murray and Tony Macaulay, which was included as the B-side on the single. "Power to All Our Friends" came third in the Eurovision Song Contest.

It was released as a single in 1973 and reached number 4 in the UK Singles Chart and became an international hit reaching number one in numerous countries.

Richard had previously represented the United Kingdom in 1968 with "Congratulations", which came second.

== Track listing ==
7": EMI / EMI 2012

1. "Power to All Our Friends" – 3:01
2. "Come Back Billie Jo" – 2:37

7": EMI / 5C 006-05312 (Netherlands)

1. "Power to All Our Friends" – 3:01
2. "The Days of Love" – 2:57

== Personnel ==
- Cliff Richard – vocals
- Terry Britten – guitar
- Kevin Peek – guitar
- Alan Tarney – bass guitar
- Trevor Spencer – drums
- Barrie Guard – percussion

== Charts ==
Chart (1973)	Peak position
Australia (Kent Music Report)	31
Austria (Ö3 Austria Top 40)	7
Belgium (Ultratop 50 Flanders)	2
Belgium (Ultratop 50 Wallonia)	3
Denmark (IFPI)	1
Finland (IFPI)	2
Germany (GfK)	4
Hong Kong (Radio Hong Kong)	1
Ireland (IRMA)	2
Malaysia (Rediffusion)	1
Netherlands (Dutch Top 40)	1
Netherlands (Single Top 100)	1
New Zealand (Listener)	11
Norway (VG-lista)	1
Singapore (Rediffusion)	10
Spain (Promusicae)	10
Sweden (Sverigetopplistan)	1
Switzerland (Schweizer Hitparade)	3
UK Singles (Official Charts)	4
US Bubbling Under the Hot 100 (Billboard)	109
Yugoslavia	4

== Cover versions ==
- Séverine – "Il faut chanter la vie" (French version)
- Peter Holm – "Il faut chanter la vie" (French version)
- Peter Holm – "Vänner som du och ja'" (Swedish version)
- Cliff Richard – "Gut, dass es Freunde gibt" (German version)
- Frank Schöbel – "Gut, dass es Freunde gibt" (German version)
- Los Sirex – "Todo el poder a los amigos " (Spanish version)
- Ricchi e Poveri – "1+2=3" (Italian version)
- Paschalis Arvanitidis – "Φίλοι και αδελφοί" (Greek version)
