= Bill Backer =

American advertising executive (1926–2016)

- Born: William Montague Backer; June 9, 1926; Manhattan, New York, US
- Died: May 13, 2016 (aged 89); Warrenton, Virginia, U.S.
- Education: Yale University; Episcopal High School
- Occupations: advertising, jingle writer
- Known for: Coca-Cola advertisements

William Montague Backer or Bill Backer (June 9, 1926 – May 13, 2016) was an American advertising executive. He is remembered for creating the Coca-Cola slogans "Things go better with Coke" and "the real thing", and the Miller Lite slogans "everything you ever wanted in a beer, and less" and "Miller Time". In 1971, Backer created the Coca-Cola campaign and accompanying song "I'd Like to Teach the World to Sing (In Perfect Harmony)."

== Early life and education ==
Backer was born in Manhattan, New York. His parents were William Bryant Backer, a real estate developer who died when Backer was six years old, and Ferdinda Legare, who, after her husband's death, moved with her son to her hometown, Charleston, South Carolina. Legare later married Dr. Joseph I. Waring.

In 1944, Backer graduated from Episcopal High School in Alexandria, Virginia, where he wrote musical comedies. He was also president of the Fairfax Literary Society and board member/editor-in-chief of The Chronicle. He was also a member of the Eight-Thirty Club, the Missionary Society, the JV football team, the varsity track team, and the winter track team.

After high school, he served two years in the United States Navy. He then attended Yale University, earning B.A. in 1950. In 1948 while at Yale, Backer wrote the music and lyrics for a musical called Moonshine! which was produced and performed by the F Society. He also was a member of St. Anthony Hall and was a leader of The Record.

== Career ==
While he was in college, Backer worked as a production assistant at Columbia Pictures and ran a small freelance music operation. After college, Backer sold real estate and wrote jingles for three years.

In 1953, he started as a mailroom trainee at McCann Erickson. He was promoted to creative director in 1972, and vice chairman of the agency in 1978. In May 1979, Backer resigned from McCann Erickson, citing "philosophical differences" with the firm's parent company, Interpublic Group of Companies.

In 1979, Backer co-founded Backer & Spielvogel with Carl Spielvogel. Spielvogel was previously the vice chairman of Interpublic and manager for Backer, resigning around two weeks before Backer. Initially, they operated the business out of a hotel room. Backer was in charge of the creative side of the business, while Spielvogel was its manager. In two years, they had billed more than $200 million and were ranked 29th in United States advertising agencies worldwide. By 1984, they were billing more than $400 million a year.

Backer & Spielvogel was purchased by Saatchi & Saatchi in May 1986 for a $56 million down payment, with $45 million more paid over six years. In July 1987, Saatchi & Saatchi merged Backer & Spielvogel with Ted Bates Worldwide which it had purchased in April 1986. However, at the time of the merger, Bates Worldwide was losing an account each week. Backer stayed as a consultant for a few years before leaving when Donald Zuckert became the ad agency's president.

In January 1989, Backer became the president of Backer Spielvogel Bates Worldwide when Zuckert stepped down. Backer said, "This is basically saying to the world that Carl's going to be the manager, and I'm going to be the creative director." He called the announcement a "symbolic signal." Backer Spielvogel Bates Worldwide had 140 offices in forty countries. In 1989, it was the third-largest advertising company in the world.

In 1992, Backer Spielvogel Bates Worldwide was negatively impacted by the recession. In November 1992, Spielvogel retired as chairman and chief executive. He was replaced by Michael Bungey who was named to the new position of CEO starting January 1, 1993. He also succeeded Backer as the company's president. However, Backer remained as vice president and worldwide executive creative director.

During his career, Backer created ad campaigns for Beech Nut Gum, Buick, Campbell's soup, Coca-Cola, Dole, Exxon, Fisher-Price, Hyundai, Löwenbräu, Miller beer, Miller Lite, Nabisco, Oreo, Parliament cigarettes, Philip Morris, Quaker Oats, and Xerox. Some of his memorable slogans include "Things go better with Coke" and "the real thing” for Coca-Cola; "soup is good food" for Campbell's; and "Miller Time" for Miller. In 1971, Backer created the Coca-Cola campaign and accompanying song "I'd Like to Teach the World to Sing (In Perfect Harmony)."

== Publications ==
- Bill Backer (1993). The Care and Feeding of Ideas (1st ed.). Crown Publishing Group. ISBN 0812919696.

== Honors ==
- Advertising Hall of Fame, 1995

== Popular culture ==
In 2015, the AMC television series Mad Men concluded with a fictional character Don Draper's conception of the "I'd Like to Teach the World to Sing..." campaign while the character was working at McCann Erickson. Media outlets contacted Backer, asking him if he was the basis of the Don Draper character. He told The New York Times: "I'm not Don Draper."

== Personal life ==
Backer married Ann Mudge in 1983 at their new farm in The Plains, Virginia.

After his retirement, Backer split time between his thoroughbred horse farm, Smitten Farm, near The Plains, Virginia, and a house in Nokomis, Florida. In Virginia, he bred and owned several stakes performers, including 2009 Grade 3-Turf Virginia Oaks winner Blind Date (by sire Not for Love) and also seven-time stakes winner Applause (by sire Shecky Greene). He was elected as a member of the Jockey Club in 2004, served on the Board of Directors of Grayson-Jockey Club Research Foundation, and road with the Orange County Hunt.

He was president of the Piedmont Foundation and was active with the Upper Fauquier Association and the Piedmont Environmental Council, serving as the president of the latter from 2004 until his death.

In 2016, Backer died of complications from colon cancer surgery at Fauquier Hospital in Warrenton, Virginia at the age of 89.
