= Circle (Harry Chapin song) =

1972 single by Harry Chapin

"Circle" is a song written and performed by Harry Chapin. The song was included on the 1972 album Sniper and Other Love Songs. Though not released as a single, it quickly became a fan favorite and is the "Chapin theme song." The song was recorded by The New Seekers and become one of their highest-charting singles, though Chapin's version is the most popular. It has been included on numerous compilation albums from Chapin's record label.

== Background ==
The song was considered by Chapin to be the "Chapin theme song". The song became a standard for live concerts as it was used at almost every concert for the end. He would encourage the audience to sing along and would also have various members of the band sing the chorus.

=== Tom Chapin Versions ===
According to Tom Chapin (Harry's brother), "Circle" was written by Harry for a TV show, Make a Wish, of which Tom was host. Tom was thus the first to perform the song. Tom, like Harry, frequently performs the song in concert and has included it on multiple albums.

== The New Seekers version ==
The same year of Chapin's release, The New Seekers covered and released the song, as "Circles". It became one of their highest-charting singles. The New Seekers included it in their 1972 album Circles.

=== Charts ===
| Chart (1972–73) | Peak position |
|---|---|
| Australia Kent Music Report | 20 |
| Canada RPM Top Singles | 42 |
| Irish Singles Chart | 3 |
| UK Singles Chart | 4 |
| US Billboard Hot 100 | 87 |
| US Easy Listening | 23 |
