= Keith Potger =

Australian singer, songwriter, and musician

Keith Potger AO
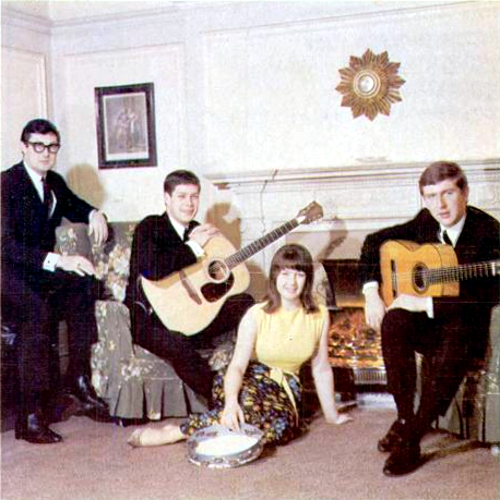
- Potger (second from left) with the Seekers in 1965

Background information
- Born: Keith Leon Potger; 21 March 1941 (age 85); Colombo, Ceylon (now Sri Lanka)
- Genre: Acoustic folk
- Occupations: Singer-songwriter, producer
- Instruments: Vocals, guitar, banjo
- Years active: 1960s–present
- Website: keithpotger.com.au

Keith Leon Potger (born 21 March 1941) is an Australian musician, who was a founding member of the Australian folk-pop group the Seekers. He was born in Ceylon (now Sri Lanka) and is of Burgher descent. In 1969, Potger and his business partner, David Joseph, co-founded the contemporary English pop group the New Seekers. Potger also records and performs as a solo artist.

In September 2014, along with his colleagues in the Seekers, Potger was appointed an Officer of the Order of Australia (AO).

== Early life ==
Keith Potger was born on 21 March 1941 in Colombo, Ceylon (now Sri Lanka), to Justin Vere Potger (1914–1990) and Joan Frances Meier (1920–2004). His brother Nigel was born 30 June 1944 and died 19 December 1948, ten months after Potger and his family migrated to Australia. Potger was nearly seven when they arrived in Melbourne. He began teaching himself to play the banjo, guitar and keyboard. While at Melbourne High School, Potger performed in vocal groups which evolved into the Seekers in early 1962. The lineup of the Seekers then consisted of Athol Guy, Bruce Woodley, Ken Ray and Potger. When Ray left the group in late 1962, Judith Durham joined and they focused on the folk and gospel music boom, accompanying themselves on guitars, banjo and double bass.

== The Seekers ==
The Seekers consisted of Judith Durham, Athol Guy, Bruce Woodley and Potger, who was an ABC radio producer. Through Potger's position, the four were able to make a demo tape in their spare time at the ABC studio in Melbourne. It was given to W&G Records, which wanted another sample of Durham's voice before agreeing to record a Jazz Preachers album with her as vocalist. W&G instead signed The Seekers for an album, Introducing The Seekers, in 1963. Potger did not appear on the album cover because he was not allowed to have a second job while an ABC employee.

In early 1964, the Seekers sailed to the United Kingdom on the S.S. Fairsky, on which the group provided the musical entertainment. Originally, they had planned to return after ten weeks, but they received a steady stream of bookings through the Grade Organisation because they had sent the agency a copy of their first album. On 4 November 1964, at EMI's Abbey Road Studios, the Seekers recorded "I'll Never Find Another You", composed and produced by Tom Springfield, which was released in December 1964. In February 1965, the song reached number one in the UK and Australia, while their 1966 recording of the Springfield and Jim Dale song,"Georgy Girl", from the film of the same name, reached number two (Billboard chart) and number one (Cashbox chart) in the United States. The success of "Georgy Girl" meant the Seekers were the first Australian group to have a number one hit in the USA.

In 1967, the Seekers set an official all-time record when more than 200,000 people (nearly one tenth of the city's entire population at that time) flocked to their performance at the Sidney Myer Music Bowl in Melbourne. Their TV special, The Seekers Down Under, had the biggest TV audience ever (with a 67 rating) and, early in 1968, they were all awarded the nation's top honour as "Australians of the Year 1967". On a tour of New Zealand in February 1968, Durham advised the group that she was leaving The Seekers, which she did in July 1968.

In the 1990s, 2000s and 2010s, the Seekers reunited and toured extensively. In September 2014, each of them was appointed an Officer of the Order of Australia (AO).

== The New Seekers ==
When the Seekers disbanded in 1968, Potger's musical activities turned to songwriting and record production in major recording studios in the UK. The New Seekers were an English pop group, formed by Potger in London in 1969. The idea was that the New Seekers would appeal to the same market as the original Seekers, but their music would have pop as well as folk influences. They achieved worldwide success in the early 1970s with hits including "I'd Like to Teach the World to Sing", "You Won't Find Another Fool Like Me" and "Beg, Steal or Borrow".

The New Seekers' second album, Keith Potger and the New Seekers, released in 1970, is their only one to feature Potger as a member.

== Solo career ==
Returning to Australia in 1978, Potger wrote and produced television jingles and music tracks, as well as performing solo concerts throughout the 1980s. In 1988, he wrote and produced stage musicals for the Australian Bicentenary. In 2004, Potger released his first solo album, Secrets of the Heart, which was followed by Sunday in 2007 and Smile Now in 2010.

== Personal life ==
In January 1966, Potger married British swimmer Pamela Powley, and they had two children. Their son Matthew (born in London, 1967) is an actor and composer. The marriage ended in divorce in 2004. On 18 November 2006, Potger married Australian actress Nicola Paull in front of four witnesses and a celebrant on the Mornington Peninsula. They divorced on 8 February 2014. By the following year, Potger was living in Braidwood, New South Wales.

In November 2018, Potger coined the word "mynonym" to be an autological synonym for the word palindrome. A similar coinage was made in the title of a 1991 book Symmys by the Dutch author Hugo Brandt Corstius, writing as Battus.

== Honours and awards ==
=== The Seekers ===
- In 1965, The

Seekers were voted the Top Best New Group by readers of the music newspaper New Musical Express. In 1966, The Seekers (Judith Durham, Athol Guy, Bruce Woodley, Keith Potger) received the Carl Alan Award for Best New Group (1965) at the Top Of The Pops Awards, in London.

- In 1968, Potger and the other members of The Seekers were named jointly and severally Australians of the Year 1967.
- In 1995, Potger and the other members of The Seekers were inducted into the Australian Record Industry Association (ARIA) Hall of Fame.
- In the 1995 Australia Day Honours, Potger, along with the other members of The Seekers, was awarded the Medal of the Order of Australia (OAM).
- In 2006, Potger and the other members of The Seekers were presented with the Key to the City by Melbourne's Lord Mayor, John So.
- In 2012, Potger and the other members of The Seekers were honoured by Australia Post with a special Legends Of Australian Music postage stamp.
- In the 2014 Queen's Birthday Honours, Potger, along with the other members of The Seekers, was advanced as an Officer of the Order of Australia (AO).
- In 2013, Potger and The Seekers received the Ted Albert Award from the Australian Performing Rights Association (APRA) for Outstanding Services to Australian Music.
- In 2015, Potger, along with the other members of The Seekers, was inducted into the Music Victoria Hall of Fame.

=== CMMA ===
In 1983, Potger, with co-writer Allan Caswell, won a Golden guitar award and was inducted into the Roll of Renown at the Tamworth Country Music Awards of Australia (CMAA)

Year	Nominee / work	Award	Result
1983	"Used to Be a Gold Song" with Allan Caswell	Song of the Year	Won

== Notable performances ==
- 1965 – The Seekers won the Top Best New Group in the New Musical Express Poll Winners Awards and performed on 11 April at the Wembley Empire Pool, on a bill that included the Beatles, the Rolling Stones, Cliff Richard and Dusty Springfield. Archive footage from this show was included in the Seekers' 2014 50th anniversary tour.
- 1965 – In June the Seekers performed in the United States on The Ed Sullivan Show singing "A World of Our Own" and "You Can Tell The World".
- 1966 – In November the Seekers performed at a Royal Command Performance at the London Palladium before the Queen Mother.
- 1967 – The Seekers made another appearance on The Ed Sullivan Show singing "Georgy Girl".
- 1967 – The Seekers represented Australia at Expo 67 in Montreal, Quebec, Canada (when they appeared on television in Australia via the first satellite transmission from the United States to Australia).
- 1967 – Melbourne, 12 March, Sidney Myer Music Bowl. The Seekers played to an estimated 200,000 people in a televised concert celebrating their overseas success.

== Television specials ==
- 1965 – An Evening with The Seekers
- 1966 – The Seekers at Home
- 1967 – The Seekers Down Under and The World of The Seekers
- Four television mini-specials titled A Date with the Seekers
- 1968 – 1968 BBC Farewell Spectacular
- 2019 – ABC Television's Australian Story
- 2019 – SBS Television screens the Decca DVD Farewell Album

== Discography ==
=== The Seekers ===
==== Albums ====
Title	Album details
Introducing the Seekers	Released: 1963; Label: W&G
The Seekers	Released: 1964; Label: W&G
Hide & Seekers	Released: 1964; Label: W&G
A World of Our Own	Released: 1965; Label: Columbia, EMI Music Australia
Come the Day	Released: September 1966; Label: Columbia, EMI
Seekers Seen in Green	Released: November 1967; Label: Columbia, EMi
The Seekers	Released: 1975; Label: Astor, Polydor
Giving and Taking	Released: July 1976; Label: Astor, Polydor
A Little Bit of Country	Released: April 1980; Label: Hammard
Live On	Released: March 1989; Label: Polydor Records
Future Road	Released: October 1997; Label: EMI Music Australia
Morningtown Ride to Christmas	Released: November 2001; Label: Sony Music Australia
Back to Our Roots	Released: June 2019; Label: Sony Music Australia

==== Live Albums ====
Title	Album details
Live at the Talk of the Town	Released: July 1968; Label: Columbia, EMI
25 Year Reunion Celebration	Released: November 1993; Label: EMI Music Australia
1968 BBC Farewell Spectacular	Released: November 1999; Label: Mushroom
Night of Nights... Live!	Released: 2002; Label: Mushroom
Farewell	Released: 12 April 2019; Label: Decca
The Carnival of Hits Tour 2000	Released: 23 August 2019; Label: Decca
Live in the UK	Released: 2 July 2021; Label: Decca

==== Singles ====
Title	Year
"Kumbaya"	1963
"Waltzing Matilda"	1963
"Myra"	1964
"I'll Never Find Another You"	1964
"What Have They Done to the Rain"	1965
"A World of Our Own"	1965
"Chilly Winds"	1965
"Morningtown Ride"	1965
"Cotton Fields"	1965
"The Carnival Is Over"	1965
"Lady Mary"	1965
"Someday, One Day"	1966
"Walk with Me"	1966
"Georgy Girl"	1966
"Isa Lei"	1966
"Myra (Shake Up the Party)"	1967
"On the Other Side"	1967
"When Will the Good Apples Fall"	1967
"Emerald City"	1967
"Love Is Kind, Love Is Wine"	1968
"Days of My Life"	1968
"With My Swag All on My Shoulder"	1968
"Island of Dreams"	1968
"Children Go Where I Send You"	1969
"Colours of My Life"	1969
"Sparrow Song"	1975
"Love Isn't Love Until You Give It Away"	1975
"Reunion"	1975
"Break These Chains"	1976
"A Part of You"	1976
"Where in the World"	1976
"Giving and Taking"	1976
"Vagabond"	1977
"How Can a Love So Wrong Be So Right"	1988
"Building Bridges"	1989
"Keep a Dream in Your Pocket"	1993
"A World of Our Own" (re-recording)	1994
"Georgy Girl" (re-recording)	1994
"Calling Me Home"	1997
"Carry Me"	2022
"—" denotes releases that did not chart or were not released in that territory.

=== Other Releases ===
Title	Details
Keith Potger and the New Seekers (with The New Seekers)	Released: 1970; Label: Philips
Secrets of the Heart	Released: 2004; Label: Keith Potger
Sunday	Released: 2007; Label: Keith Potger
Smile Now	Released: 2010; Label: Keith Potger
