= You Won't Find Another Fool Like Me =

Single by The New Seekers

from the album Together
- B-side: "Song for You and Me"
- Released: November 1973
- Genre: Pop
- Label: Polydor Records
- Songwriters: Tony Macaulay, Geoff Stephens
- Producer: Tommy Oliver

"You Won't Find Another Fool Like Me" is a 1973 single by British pop group The New Seekers. The song is written by Tony Macaulay and Geoff Stephens, arranged by Gerry Shury and produced by Tommy Oliver.

Featuring lead vocals by member Lyn Paul (the first time she had sung lead on a single), the song became the group's biggest hit for two years as it remained in the top five over Christmas 1973. "You Won't Find Another Fool Like Me" went on to be the band's second and final number-one single in the UK Singles Chart, spending a single week at the top of the chart in January 1974. The song was included in the group's final album as an active band, Together, as they announced their decision to split a month later.

== Charts ==
=== Weekly charts ===
| Chart (1973–1974) | Peak position |
|---|---|
| Australia (Kent Music Report) | 5 |
| Canada | 81 |
| Ireland (IRMA) | 1 |
| New Zealand (Listener) | 6 |
| United Kingdom (OCC) | 1 |

=== Year-end charts ===
| Chart (1974) | Rank |
|---|---|
| Australia (Kent Music Report) | 39 |
