= Beg, Steal or Borrow =

1972 song by The New Seekers

- Cover of vinyl single

Single by The New Seekers
- Released: 1972
- Songwriters: Tony Cole; Steve Wolfe; Graeme Hall

Eurovision Song Contest 1972 entry
- Country: United Kingdom
- Artists: Lyn Paul; Peter Doyle; Paul Layton; Marty Kristian; Eve Graham
- As: The New Seekers
- Language: English
- Composers: Tony Cole; Steve Wolfe; Graeme Hall
- Lyricists: Steve Wolfe; Graeme Hall; Tony Cole
- Conductor: David Mackay

Finals performance
- Final result: 2nd
- Final points: 114

Entry chronology
- ◄ "Jack in the Box" (1971)
- "Power to All Our Friends" (1973) ►

"Beg, Steal or Borrow" is a song performed by The New Seekers. It represented the United Kingdom in the Eurovision Song Contest 1972.

The song was composed and written by Tony Cole, Steve Wolfe and Graeme Hall. It is a love song to a former lover claiming the two should be together and the singer will "beg, steal or borrow" in order to "bring" the other love.

On the night of the contest, the song was performed fifth, directed by David Mackay. It followed Spain's Jaime Morey with "Amanece" and preceded Norway's Grethe Kausland and Benny Borg with "Småting". At the close of voting, it had received 114 points, placing 2nd in a field of 18, behind Après toi by Luxembourg's Vicky Leandros with 128 points.

== Charts ==
Chart (1972)	Peak position
Belgium (Flemish)	9
Canada	61
Germany	5
Ireland	3
Netherlands	3
New Zealand (Listener)	2
Norway	1
South Africa	10
Switzerland	5
United Kingdom	2
United States	81

Preceded by "Jack in the Box" by Clodagh Rodgers	United Kingdom in the Eurovision Song Contest; 1972	Succeeded by "Power to All Our Friends" by Cliff Richard
