= I'd Like to Teach the World to Sing (In Perfect Harmony) =

1971 single by The New Seekers

Single by The Hillside Singers

from the album I'd Like to Teach the World to Sing
- B-side: "I Believed It All"
- Released: November 1971
- Genre: Folk pop, sunshine pop
- Length: 2:15
- Label: Metromedia
- Songwriters: Bill Backer; Billy Davis; Roger Cook; Roger Greenaway
- Producer: Al Ham

Audio
- "I'd Like to Teach the World to Sing" on YouTube

"I'd Like to Teach the World to Sing (In Perfect Harmony)"

Single by The New Seekers

from the album We'd Like to Teach the World to Sing
- B-side: "Boom Town"
- Released: November 1971
- Genre: Pop
- Length: 2:20
- Label: Philips (Germany); Polydor (UK); Elektra (USA/Canada)
- Songwriters: Roger Cook, Roger Greenaway, Bill Backer and Billy Davis
- Producer: David Mackay

The New Seekers singles chronology
"Never Ending Song of Love" (1971)	"I'd Like to Teach the World to Sing (In Perfect Harmony)" (1971)	"Beg, Steal or Borrow" (1972)

Audio
- "I'd Like to Teach the World to Sing (In Perfect Harmony)" on YouTube

"I'd Like to Teach the World to Sing (In Perfect Harmony)" is a song (originally known as "True Love and Apple Pie") by the British songwriters Roger Cook and Roger Greenaway, and sung by Susan Shirley.

The lyrics were rewritten by the songwriters together with American advertising executive Bill Backer and American songwriter Billy Davis as a jingle for The Coca-Cola Company's advertising agency, McCann Erickson, becoming "Buy the World a Coke" for the 1971 "Hilltop" television commercial for Coca-Cola, sung by the New Seekers. "Buy the World a Coke" was produced by Billy Davis and portrayed a positive message of hope and love, featuring a multicultural collection of young people on top of a hill appearing to sing the song.

The popularity of the jingle led to its being re-recorded in two full-length versions with new lyrics that removed the references to Coca-Cola, one by The New Seekers and the other by the Hillside Singers. The song became a hit record in both the US and the UK.

== Origins ==
The idea originally came to Bill Backer, an advertising executive working for McCann Erickson, the agency responsible for Coca-Cola. Backer, Roger Cook and Billy Davis were delayed at Shannon Airport in Ireland. After a forced layover with many hot tempers, they noticed their fellow travelers the next morning were talking and joking while drinking Coca-Cola. Backer wrote the line "I'd like to buy the world a Coke" on a napkin and shared it with Cook and Roger Greenaway.

The melody was derived from a previous song by Cook and Greenaway, originally called "True Love and Apple Pie," that was recorded in 1971 by Susan Shirley. Cook, Greenaway, Backer and Billy Davis reworked the song into a Coca-Cola radio jingle, which was performed by British pop group The New Seekers and recorded at Trident Studios in London. The radio jingle made its debut in February 1971 before being adapted for the Coca-Cola "Hilltop" television commercial later that year.

The commercial ended with the statement:

On a hilltop in Italy,
We assembled young people
From all over the world...
To bring you this message
From Coca-Cola Bottlers
All over the world.
It's the real thing. Coke.

The song became so popular that its creators revised it, adding three verses and removing product references (although the Hillside Singers' version still contains the Coke slogan "It's the real thing") to create a full-length song appropriate for commercial release. The full-length song was re-recorded by both The Hillside Singers and The New Seekers and both versions became huge hits.

== TV commercial ==
External videos
- I'd Like to Buy the World a Coke Commercial - 1971 on YouTube

=== Lyrics ===
"Buy the World a Coke" contains the line "I'd like to buy the world a Coke" and repeats "It's the real thing", which was Coca-Cola's marketing slogan. The Coca-Cola Company introduced that slogan in October 1969.

=== Versions as advertisements ===
Several versions of the ad have been made.

- The song first aired on American radio on February 12, 1971, but not all of the Coca-Cola bottlers were impressed. DJs reported that they were receiving requests to hear the commercial. Backer persuaded McCann-Erickson to film a commercial using the song. The TV commercial, titled "Hilltop", was directed by Roberto Malenotti. The ad cost $250,000 ($2.0 million today), then the most expensive commercial in history. The first attempt at shooting was ruined by rain and other location problems. The finished product, which first aired in July 1971, featured a multicultural group of young people lip synching the song on a hill in the municipality of Manziana outside Rome, Italy. The first woman seen was Linda Neary, who was working as a governor in Rome and accepted the job two days before shooting began, although she never met most of the other young people in commercial. The global unity of the singers is emphasized by showing that the bottles of Coke they are holding are labelled in a variety of languages.
- A Christmas-themed version of the ad debuted in 1977, referred to as "Candles" as distinguished from the "Hilltop" campaign. Instead of standing still while holding bottles of Coca-Cola, young people now held candles and rocked rhythmically while seated on a hillside. It was set after dark to emphasize the points of light. The pop instrumental backing was replaced with a glockenspiel and sleigh bells. By the end, the camera pulled back to an overhead view of the candles to reveal an overall shape of a lit Christmas tree.
- In 1987, a commercial aired which was based on a similar theme of togetherness. It was filmed at St George's Hall, Liverpool, but featured a different song called "I Am the Future of the World" and sung by Wendy Maguire.
- In 1990, a follow-up to this commercial, called "Hilltop Reunion" and directed by Jeff Lovinger, aired during coverage of Super Bowl XXIV. It featured the original cast members, including Linda Neary (now middle-aged adults), now joined by their children, and culminated in a medley of this song and the current "Can't Beat the Real Thing" jingle.
- G. Love remade the song for the Coca-Cola Zero commercial "Everybody Chill", which aired in 2005.
- In 2006, the song was used again in a Coca-Cola commercial in the Netherlands, performed by Dutch singer Berget Lewis.
- In 2010, Coca-Cola once again used the song in a television commercial featuring the entire line of its sponsored NASCAR Sprint Cup drivers. The commercial included the drivers singing the song while driving in a race.
- In 2011, information on how many dollars it would take "to buy the world a Coke" was given in a commercial featuring the red silhouette of a Coke bottle and the melody of the song.
- In 2012, as part of the Google's Project Re:Brief campaign, the "Hilltop" ad was reimagined for the digital age. Via the web, people were able to "send" a Coke to special vending machines located around the globe. Recipients of the Coke could then record a thank-you message to send back to the sender. Machines were located in Buenos Aires (Argentina), Cape Town (South Africa), Mountain View (California, United States), and New York City (New York, United States).
- In 2015, a public service announcement was made by Center for Science in the Public Interest about the consequences of excessive soda consumption and contained an altered version of the song. The advert featured hospital doctors and dentists and patients struggling with obesity-induced diseases (type 2 diabetes, hypertension and tooth decay). Near the end, it showed Pepsi, Coca-Cola and Mountain Dew in beverage cups named "Obesity", "Diabetes Type Two" and "Tooth Decay" in the respective typefaces being poured away. The campaign was named "Change the Tune".

=== Significance and reception ===
In 2007, Campaign magazine called it "one of the best-loved and most influential ads in TV history". It served as a milestone—the first instance of the recording industry's involvement with advertising.

Marketing analysts have noted Coca-Cola's strategy of marrying the idea of happiness and universal love of the product illustrated by the song.

The commercial has continued receiving accolades; in 2000, Channel 4 and The Sunday Times ranked the advertising jingle 16th in the 100 Greatest TV Ads while in 2005, ITV ranked the advertisement 10th in its list of the greatest advertisements.

=== Use in Mad Men ===
The advertisement and song have a significant role in the series finale to the television show Mad Men. In the finale, titled "Person to Person", the series' protagonist, Don Draper, is seen meditating in the episode's final shot before cutting to the advertisement. The use of the advertisement as the end of the episode (and series) has led to various interpretations. Jen Chaney for Esquire wrote that "Mad Men's deliberately ambiguous conclusion most obviously implies that Don takes his experience at that touchy-feely California retreat back to McCann Erickson and does what Don, at his best, has always done: turns highly personal human experience into brilliant shills for product," implying that Draper will eventually create the advertisement. (The series ends in the year 1970, and the advertisement did not debut until 1971.)

Regarding the use of the advertisement in the finale, series creator Matthew Weiner stated, "[i]n the abstract, I did think, why not end this show with the greatest commercial ever made? In terms of what it means to people and everything, I am not ambiguity for ambiguity's sake. But it was nice to have your cake and eat it too, in terms of what is advertising, who is Don and what is that thing?"

== Singles ==
=== The Hillside Singers ===
After the TV commercial aired, radio stations began to get calls from people who liked it. Billy Davis' friends in radio suggested he record the song, but not as an advertising jingle. It became so popular that the song was rewritten without brand name references and expanded to three verses. Davis recruited a group of studio singers to take it on because The New Seekers did not have time to record it. The studio group named themselves The Hillside Singers to identify with the ad, and within two weeks the song was on the national charts. The Hillside Singers' version reached #13 on the Billboard Hot 100, #5 on Billboard's Easy Listening chart and #58 on the RPM charts in Canada. Billboard ranked this version as the No. 97 song for 1972.

=== The New Seekers ===
The New Seekers later recorded the song and sold 96,000 copies of their record in one day, eventually selling 12 million total. "I'd Like to Teach the World to Sing (In Perfect Harmony)" climbed to #1 in the UK, #3 in Canada and #7 in the US in 1971 and 1972. The song became a gold record in the US and has also sold over a million copies in the UK. The Coca-Cola Company waived royalties to the song and instead donated $80,000 in payments to UNICEF. Billboard ranked this version as the No. 93 song for 1972.

== Chart performance ==
=== Year-end charts ===
==== New Seekers version ====
Chart (1971–1972)	Peak position
Australia (Kent Music Report)	7
Belgium (Ultratop 50 Wallonia)	20
Canada Top Singles (RPM)	3
Finland (Suomen virallinen lista)	6
France (IFOP)	21
Iceland	5
Ireland (IRMA)	1
Japan (Oricon Singles Chart)	1
Malaysia (Rediffusion)	1
Netherlands (Dutch Top 40)	28
New Zealand	1
Norway (VG-lista)	2
Singapore (Rediffusion)	2
South Africa (Springbok)	10
Sweden (Kvällstoppen)	3
UK Singles (Official Charts)	1
US Billboard Hot 100	7
US Adult Contemporary (Billboard)	27
West Germany (GfK)	24

Chart (1972)	Rank
Australia	66
Canada	29
Finland (Suomen virallinen lista)	29
UK	5
US Billboard Hot 100	93

==== Hillside Singers version ====
Chart (1971–1972)	Peak position
Australian (Kent Music Report)	27
Canada Top Singles (RPM)	58
Canada Adult Contemporary (RPM)	1
US Billboard Hot 100	13
US Adult Contemporary (Billboard)	5

Chart (1972)	Rank
US Billboard Hot 100	97

== Certifications ==
Region	Certification	Certified units/sales
United States (RIAA)	Gold	1,000,000^{^}
^{^} Shipments figures based on certification alone.

== Covers and inspiration for other music ==
- The British rock band Oasis was sued after their recording "Shakermaker" borrowed its melody and some lyrics directly; they were forced to change their composition as a result.
- Oasis tribute band No Way Sis released a cover of the song that entered the British charts at #27 in 1996.
- A version of the song was included in the Kidsongs video of the same name.
- In 2016, Lucy Layton (daughter of New Seekers singer and bassist Paul Layton) released a cover of the song. Her official video, posted to YouTube on September 23, depicted the violence faced by Syrian refugees, with the visuals of war being in stark contrast to the song's message of peace and harmony.
- In 2018, China promoted its Belt and Road Initiative with a video of a song called "I'd Like to Build the World a Road" based on the lyrics, melody, and imagery of Coke's "Hilltop" ad and song.

== See also ==
- Advertising management
- Brand management
- "First Time" (Robin Beck song), a song that also came to prominence via a Coca-Cola TV commercial
- List of Coca-Cola slogans
- Share a Coke, a Coca-Cola campaign that ran from 2010 to 2017
