= The New Seekers =

British pop group

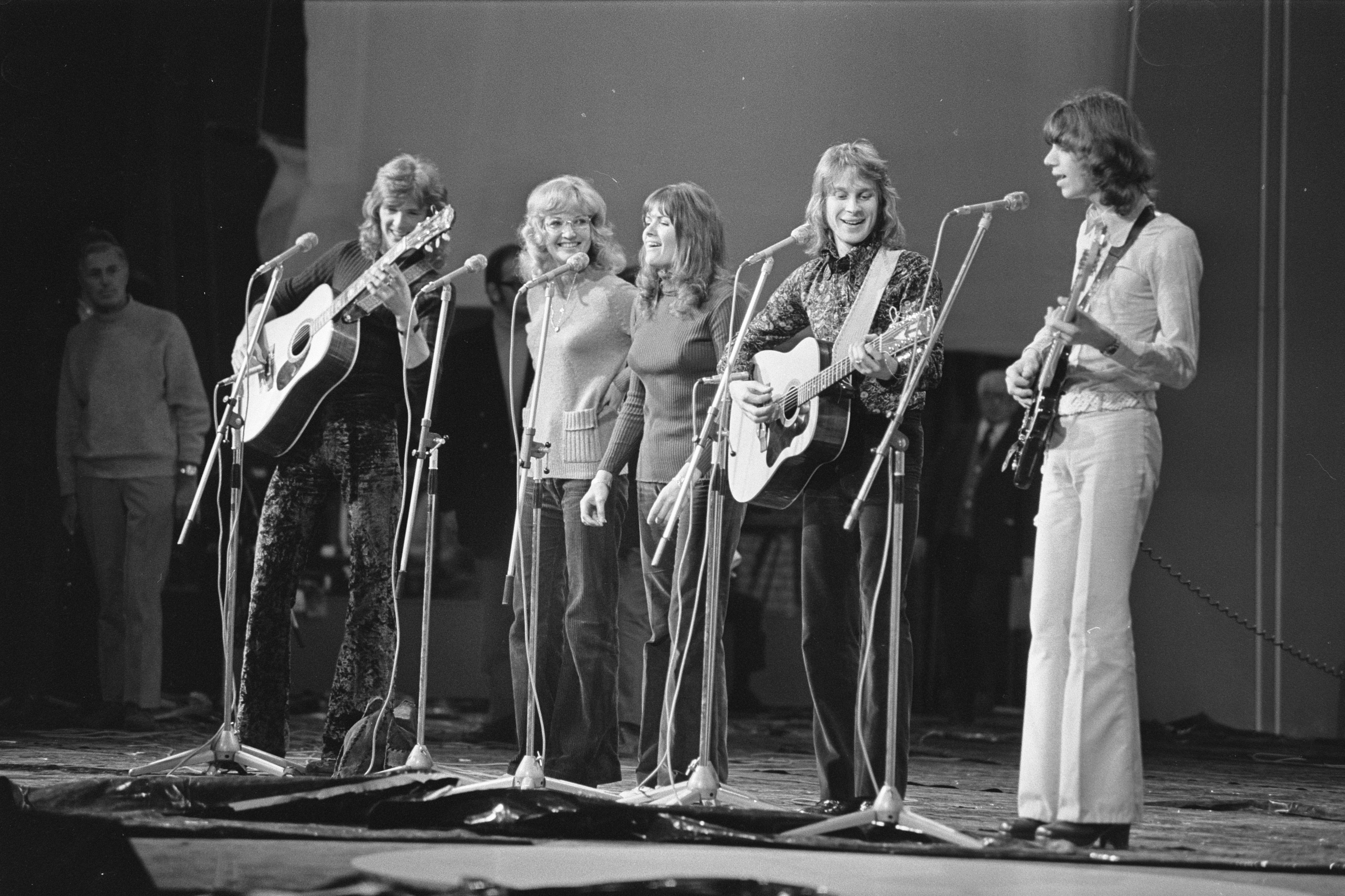
- The New Seekers in 1972

Background information
- Origin: London, England
- Genres: Pop; folk; rock
- Years active: 1969–1974; 1976–2010
- Labels: Philips; Polydor; CBS; EMI; Universal; Elektra (US); MGM (US)
- Past members: Paul Layton; Eve Graham; Lyn Paul; Marty Kristian; Peter Doyle; Peter Oliver; Keith Potger; Sally Graham; Laurie Heath; Chris Barrington; Kathy Ann Rae; Nicola Kerr; Danny Finn; Caitriona Walsh; Donna Jones; Francine Rees; Mick Flinn; Vikki James; Brian Engel; Vivien Banks; Isobel Davies; Jilly Franklyn; Mark Hankins

The New Seekers were a British pop group, formed in London in 1969 by Keith Potger, after the break-up of his group, the Seekers. The idea was that the New Seekers would appeal to the same market as the original Seekers, but their music would have pop as well as folk influences. They achieved worldwide success in the early 1970s with hits including "I'd Like to Teach the World to Sing", "You Won't Find Another Fool Like Me" and "Beg, Steal or Borrow".

== Formation ==
The group were formed after the disbanding of the successful 1960s Australian group the Seekers. Keith Potger, a member of the Seekers, put together the New Seekers in 1969, featuring Laurie Heath, Chris Barrington, Marty Kristian, Eve Graham and Sally Graham (no relation), the last of whom had been a member of The Young Generation. Potger himself had also performed and recorded with the group.

Despite their having released only one album with no commercial success, ITV's Scottish Television gave the group their own TV series, Finders, Seekers. The line-up for this version of the group hosting the series was Keith Potger, Eve Graham, Sally Graham, Laurie Heath, Marty Kristian and Chris Barrington. Produced in colour, the show was given a prime-time slot, starting on 27 March 1970 (Good Friday) and continuing for seven shows. The public did not take to the show, with several complaints seemingly targeted at the band. Despite the complaints, the series was shown on several ITV channels, sold to Canada, Australia and Sweden with interest from other countries as a result of being shown at the international television market in Cannes.

Following the series' failure, later in 1970, after one album release, the line-up was reworked to comprise Eve Graham, Kristian, Lyn Paul, Peter Doyle and Paul Layton. This line-up found instant success with their debut release, a cover of Melanie Safka's "What Have They Done to My Song, Ma" (titled in the U.S. as "Look What They've Done to My Song, Ma"), which became a top 20 hit in the US, No. 3 in Canada, and a minor one in the UK.

== Mainstream success ==
Over the next year, the group released a number of singles to little recognition, but it was in June 1971 that they released their breakthrough hit, "Never Ending Song of Love" (the first of many hit songs to be produced by David Mackay, and a cover of the American hit by Delaney & Bonnie). The song became a big hit in the UK, spending five weeks at No. 2 in the UK Singles Chart, and was one of the biggest selling singles of the year. This was their last single released on the Philips Records label. The huge success of this single was mildly ironic in that prior to the single's release, the group were dropped by Philips and had signed with Polydor Records. Their first single for Polydor was "Good Old Fashioned Music", which they promoted on television (including an appearance on Top Of The Pops), but it failed to chart. Towards the end of 1971, the group recorded an adaptation of the Coca-Cola jingle, "I'd Like to Buy the World a Coke", which had gained much interest. Reworked as "I'd Like to Teach the World to Sing", the song became a worldwide success. It made No. 1 in the UK for four weeks and sold just under a million copies. In the US, the song was also a hit, reaching No. 7, and in Canada it reached No. 3. It became a No. 1 hit in many other countries and is the most recognised song by the group.

The group were chosen to represent the United Kingdom in the 1972 Eurovision Song Contest. They entered with the song "Beg, Steal or Borrow", which was chosen by viewers of BBC1's It's Cliff Richard! show from six shortlisted songs performed by the group on a weekly basis. They went on to finish in second place at the Eurovision final in Edinburgh, where the group received the biggest cheer of the night from the partisan audience. The song was a No. 2 hit in the UK and sold well in Europe. Around this time, they also charted highly with their most successful album, We'd Like to Teach the World to Sing, which reached No. 2 in the UK Albums Chart. Another top five hit came with the next single, "Circles" in mid 1972. At the end of the year, the group took part in the BBC's anniversary TV show Fifty Years Of Music.

The following year the group saw a slight dip, although they did score a top 20 hit with an adaptation of "Pinball Wizard". Member Peter Doyle left the group this year and was replaced by Peter Oliver. The New Seekers had enjoyed a number of hits in the US by this time and toured there with Liza Minnelli in 1973. While there, they recorded the title track of the American Marlo Thomas's 1972 album Free to Be... You and Me. In 1974, the album was made into a landmark television programme designed to teach children how to express themselves and be independent through a series of vignettes. Since the special was first broadcast, the song became a cult classic.

Up to now, the group's biggest success had been as a five-piece harmony, but it was around this time that they began to favour lead singers for their songs with title credits given to Marty Kristian for "Come Softly to Me" and Eve Graham for "Nevertheless", but it was in late 1973 that this formula found its biggest success when Lyn Paul took the lead on the new single, "You Won't Find Another Fool Like Me". The song became a big hit over Christmas and eventually peaked at No. 1 in January 1974, becoming their second biggest hit. This formula continued with the next single, "I Get a Little Sentimental Over You", which also became a big hit, peaking at No. 5. However, despite this revival, the group announced their split amid much publicity. With allegations that the members were receiving little financial reward for their success, The New Seekers officially disbanded in May 1974.

The group's two UK number one singles are listed as being in the top 30 best selling singles for the 1970s, with "I'd Like To Teach The World To sing" at No. 17 and "You Won't Find Another Fool Like Me" at No. 27. "We've Got To Do It Now" was used in a public information film in both the United Kingdom and the United States about littering.

== Reformation ==
In 1976, the New Seekers reformed with Kathy Ann Rae and Danny Finn replacing Lyn Paul and Peter Oliver. Although they never replicated their earlier success, signed to CBS (Columbia in the US) the group did manage to score a few hits with "It's So Nice (To Have You Home)" (1976), "I Wanna Go Back" (1977) and "Anthem (One Day in Every Week)" (1978). This line up remained intact until 1978, when Danny Finn and Eve Graham left the group to marry. Their final single for CBS was "Don't Stop The Music" in 1979, with Kathy Ann Rae on lead vocal, but after it failed to chart, she left the band and the group signed their final contract with EMI.

In 1980, the group attempted to represent the UK again in the Eurovision Song Contest with the song "Tell Me", but it was disqualified shortly before the British heats were televised due to the fact the group had already performed the song on TV a year earlier.

Marty Kristian entered a song in the 1983 UK Eurovision finals, performed by a trio called 'Audio', which included Kathy Ann Rae in the line up.

Since then, there have been personnel changes which included Caitriona Walsh, Nicola Kerr and Vikki James (Grammy Winner Victoria Horn). Paul Layton remained with the band throughout this time. The final tour was 2010.

== Recent career ==
The New Seekers toured from 2006 with a line up of Paul Layton, Donna Jones, Francine Rees, Mick Flinn and Mark Hankins. A CD of the 2006 tour was released which includes the group's hits and some cover versions. With a Royal Variety performance at St James's Palace, London for Charles, Prince of Wales and Camilla, Duchess of Cornwall and an appearance on ITV's This Morning, they completed 2006. The New Seekers helped host a garden party in 2007 at Buckingham Palace. This was repeated the following year along with a show at The Tower of London and a return batch of concerts in British theatres. The 40th anniversary of the group in 2009 was celebrated by a 35-date UK concert tour, which began at London's Shaw Theatre on 31 January and continued throughout the year. In July 2009, an album was released; It's Been Too Long – Greatest Hits and More, comprising the group's hits and some new recordings. It entered the UK Albums Chart at No. 17, their first album to enter that chart for 35 years.

In 2011 and 2012 Marty Kristian released two albums of demo recordings from the 1970s and 1980s.

== Members ==
=== Female vocals ===
- Eve Graham (born Evelyn May Beatson, 19 April 1943, Auchentiber, Scotland)
- Sally Graham (born 1947)
- Lyn Paul (born Lynda Susan Belcher, 16 February 1949, Wythenshawe, England)
- Kathy Ann Rae (born Cathy Logan, 7 March 1957, Cambridge, England, died 11 January 2011)
- Vivien Banks
- Nicola Kerr
- Catriona Walsh
- Donna Jones (born 8 April 1949, Manchester, England)
- Vikki James (born Victoria Horn, 1973)
- Francine Rees

=== Guitar ===
- Marty Kristian (born Martin Vanags, 27 May 1947, Leipzig, Germany)
- Laurie Heath
- Peter Doyle (born Peter John Doyle, 28 July 1949, Melbourne, Australia, died 13 October 2001, Castlemaine, Australia)
- Peter Oliver (born Larry Oliver, 15 January 1952, Southampton, England)
- Danny Finn (born Kevin Finn, 30 March 1944, Oxford, England, died 22 February 2016)
- Brian Engel
- Mick Flinn (born Victoria, Australia)
- Mark Hankins

=== Bass ===
- Chris Barrington (born 1950, Lancashire, England)
- Paul Layton (born 4 August 1947, Beaconsfield, England)

== Discography ==
- The New Seekers (1970)
- Keith Potger and the New Seekers (1970)
- Beautiful People (1971)
- New Colours (1971)
- We'd Like to Teach the World to Sing (1971)
- Never Ending Song of Love (1972)
- Circles (1972)
- Come Softly to Me (1972)
- Now (1973)
- Together (1974)
- Farewell Album (1974)
- Together Again (1976)
- Anthem – One Day in Every Week (1978)
- Tell Me (1982)

Awards and achievements
Preceded by Clodagh Rodgers with "Jack in the Box"	UK in the Eurovision Song Contest; 1972	Succeeded by Cliff Richard with "Power to All Our Friends"
