= Eve Graham =

Eve Graham MBE
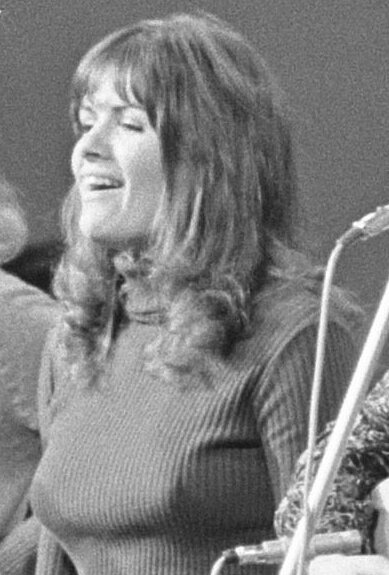

Background information
- Born: Evelyn May Beatson; 19 April 1943 (age 83); Auchterarder, Perth and Kinross, Scotland
- Genres: Pop
- Occupation: Singer
- Years active: 1963– present
- Formerly of: The Cyclones; Cyril Stapleton Band; The Track; The Nocturnes; The New Seekers

Eve Graham (born Evelyn May Beatson; 19 April 1943) is a Scottish singer who found fame in the early 1970s with the pop group The New Seekers.

== Biography ==
=== Music career ===
Graham began her career during the 1960s as a band singer with the Cyclones in Scotland and later with the Cyril Stapleton Band, based in London, England. She joined The Track in the mid-sixties and was a founding member of The Nocturnes, originally alongside Sandra Stevens (later of Brotherhood of Man) and then Lyn Paul (her future colleague in The New Seekers), recording for UK Columbia Records between 1967 and 1969.

In 1969, she joined songwriter Roger Cooke for a single release, again on Columbia, called "Smiling Through My Tears" shortly before becoming a founder member of The New Seekers in 1969 and was lead singer on the majority of their early hits, including the world wide Number One hit – "I'd Like to Teach the World to Sing (In Perfect Harmony)". Other songs that featured Graham as lead vocalist included the US and Canadian smash "Look What They've Done to My Song Ma", the British Top 5 hit "Circles", the Japanese No.1 "The Greatest Song I've Ever Heard" and the Roger Cook-Roger Greenaway composition "We've Got To Do It Now".

Graham's three-octave range was showcased on several songs, most notably the British and European hit "Never Ending Song of Love", in which she reached No. 6. Though mainly a vocalist, she played acoustic guitar on stage in the Chuck Berry-influenced Skiffle-number "Good Old-Fashioned Music" and kazoo in the comic song "(Ever Since You Told Me That You Loved Me) I'm A Nut".

=== Cabaret career ===
In 1974, the group disbanded and Graham moved onto solo cabaret work, but rejoined a reconstituted New Seekers in 1976, and sang lead on their hits "It's So Nice To Have You Home" and "I Wanna Go Back". In 1978 she left once more, and again performed as a solo singer, as well as marrying another ex-New Seeker Kevin Finn (known professionally as Danny Finn) on 1 June 1979. They toured as a duo for many years and released one single "Ocean and Blue Sky".

=== Rumours of Retirement ===
Graham was reported to have retired in 2000 after a charity performance, despite having said then that she could not contemplate final retirement. In 2005, former New Seekers record producer David Mackay produced a new album with her The Mountains Welcome Me Home. It was released as a CD and DVD, and contained Scottish traditional songs and new solo versions of New Seekers songs. A Christmas themed album, Til The Season Comes Round Again, followed in 2006.

In 2008, she told The Independent newspaper that, after the band broke up, she enjoyed "doing something totally different" fitting bras in a branch of Debenhams department store in Essex. She moved to Abernethy, Perthshire with her husband, who worked for a kitchen and bathroom design company. He died on 22 February 2016 after a short illness. She still lives there and continues to work.(2026)

Graham told The Independent that owing to contractual problems she has not received any royalties since 1973.

She was appointed Member of the Order of the British Empire (MBE) in the 2026 New Year Honours for services to the music industry.

== Discography (excluding The New Seekers) ==
- The Track :
  - "Why Do Fools Fall in Love" b/w "Cry to Me" (single) – Columbia DB 7987 (UK) August 1966
- Nocturnes :
  - "I Do, I Do" b/w "Wish You Would Show Me Your Mind" (single) – Columbia DB 8158 (UK) February 1967
  - "Why? (Am I Treated So Bad)" b/w "Save the Last Dance for Me" (single) – Columbia DB 8219 (UK) June 1967 / Columbia C23 594 (Germany) September 1967
  - "A New Man" b/w "Suddenly Free" (single) – Columbia DB 8332 (UK) January 1968
  - "Carpet Man" b/w "Look at Me" (single) – Columbia DB 8453 (UK) July 1968 / Columbia C23 863 (Germany) August 1968
  - "Montage" b/w "Fairground Man" (single) – Columbia DB 8493 (UK) November 1968
  - "Da Doo Ron Ron" b/w "Carpet Man" (single) – Columbia 1C006-04 976 (Germany) October 1971 (recorded in 1968)
  - Nocturnes (album) – Columbia SCX 6223 (UK) – 1968
- Roger James Cooke :
  - "Smiling Through My Tears" (with Eve Graham) b/w "Ain't That a Wonderful Thing" (single) – Columbia DB 8596 (UK) June 1969
  - Study (album) – Columbia SCX 6388 (UK) – 1970 – includes "Is it You That Has the Power?"
- Eve Graham and Danny Finn :
  - "Ocean and Blue Sky" b/w "I Couldn't Love You More" (single) – Chrysalis CHS 2269 (UK) April 1979
  - "Your Love" b/w "Falling in Love Again" (single) – Celebrity Records ACS 3 (UK) February 1981
- Viva :
  - "Chris Must Stay" b/w "Light of the World" (single) – Cambra CMB 01 (UK) November 1981
- Eve Graham (solo) :
  - Thanks for the Memories (album) – 1973 – unreleased until 2012 on iTunes
  - Woman of the World (album) – Celebrity Records ACLP 007 (UK) – 1980, re-released as Evergreen – 2012 on iTunes
  - On the Road (Woman of the World album, repackaged – cassette only) – Celebrity Records (UK) 1981
  - "Highland Cathedral" b/w "I'd Like to Teach the World to Sing" / "The Mountains" (cd single) – Scotdisc CDITV4S 722 (UK) – September 2005
  - The Mountains Welcome Me Home (DVD) – Scotdisc DVITV 721 (UK) – October 2005
  - Til the Season Comes 'Round Again (album) – Scotdisc CDITV 742 (UK) – 2006
  - "Love Won the Fight" (digital download) – Scotdisc – 2014 on iTunes & Amazon MP3
  - "A Matter Of Time" (album) - Scotdisc CDITV 882 (UK) - 2018
  - "How I Love Them Old Songs" (digital download) -Scotdisc - November 2025.
