= Lyn Paul =

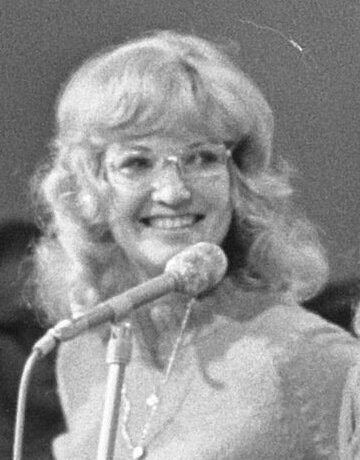

Background information
- Born: Lynda Susan Belcher; 16 February 1949 (age 77); Wythenshawe, Manchester, England
- Genre: Pop
- Occupations: Singer, actress
- Years active: 1960–present
- Website: lynpaulwebsite.org

Lyn Paul (born Lynda Susan Belcher; 16 February 1949) is an English pop singer and actress. She came to fame as a member of the international chart-topping pop group the New Seekers in the early 1970s. She has more recently found success and critical acclaim starring in the long-running West End musical, Blood Brothers.

== Early life ==
Paul began her career in show business as a child actress in 1960, while attending regular classes in dance and musical theatre. In the early 1960s she led her own teenage girl band the Crys-Do-Lyns, touring all over Wythenshawe. She subsequently qualified as a teacher of dance. In the late 1960s she changed her name to Tanzy Paul and began a solo career as a pop singer, before joining the well-respected Manchester group the Nocturnes along with Eve Graham, before Graham left to join the New Seekers.

== The New Seekers ==
When Sally Graham (no relation) left the New Seekers, Eve Graham recommended Paul as a replacement. Graham sang lead on most of their earlier hits, but Paul was gradually entrusted with a lot of the lead parts. She was the featured vocalist on their 1972 Eurovision Song Contest entry, "Beg, Steal or Borrow" in which they came second. She was also lead vocalist on the 1974 No.1 hit "You Won't Find Another Fool Like Me" and the No.5 single, "I Get A Little Sentimental Over You". Among the group's other works, they recorded the song "I'd Like to Teach the World to Sing", adapted from an advertising jingle for Coca-Cola, which sold over 20 million copies and still remains one of the 100 best-selling singles in the UK. They had many other hits; most notably, Harry Chapin's "Circles"; Delaney and Bonnie's "Never Ending Song of Love" and a medley of Pete Townshend's "Pinball Wizard"/"See Me, Feel Me" from The Who's rock opera Tommy. They also headlined at the London Palladium and the Royal Albert Hall. The band were also invited to perform at President Richard Nixon's inauguration ball.

== Solo career ==
After she left the group in 1974, Paul performed as a solo artist for many years and became a television personality, appearing on many television programmes including: Emergency Ward 10, Skyport, Give Us a Clue, Celebrity Squares and 3-2-1 as well as countless variety programmes. Her first solo single, which spent a frustrating seventeen weeks hovering outside the UK Top 50, was the Golden Globe nominated "Sail the Summer Winds", a John Barry and Don Black composition, which was the theme to the first film produced by Gregory Peck, 1974's The Dove. She had a UK Top 40 hit in 1975 with a song that was originally recorded at the same sessions as I'd Like To Teach The World To Sing. The track was used as the jingle for Coca-Cola in the summer of 1975; it was subsequently recorded as a single by Paul with backing vocals from ex-New Seekers singer Peter Doyle and released as "It Oughta Sell A Million".

During her solo career, she has worked with Andy Williams, Jack Jones, Debbie McGee, Dionne Warwick and with The New Seekers as supporting act for Liza Minnelli, and has won various accolades including the Carl-Alan Award several times. Her other Polydor singles include "Who's Sorry Now", "Love", "Here Comes That Wonderful Feeling" and "Mama Don't Wait For Me". She also released her first solo album Give Me Love in 1975. In 1977, after moving to Pye Records, Paul sang "If Everybody Loved The Same As You" in the Song for Europe UK selection, coming joint sixth. She went on to record "I Don't Believe You Ever Loved Me", a cover of the Doobie Brothers' "Echoes of Love", and a 1980s power-ballad "Make the Night". She released a single "Hold Me" under the name of Future Primitive with her brother Paul (whose name she took as her stage surname) in 1984. She also headlined at many cabaret clubs including: The Cockney Cabaret, the Talk of London, and the Café Royal.

In 2006, she released an album titled Late Night. It contained her versions of some of her favourite songs, including "Crying", "I Only Have Eyes For You", "Dance with My Father" and "Late Night Grande Hotel". In addition, it also contained two new tracks written for her, "Dance With Desire" and "Clouds".

In 2009, Paul performed in a show called The Sound of the New Seekers.

== Musical theatre and acting ==
Paul found great success, when she starred in the musical Blood Brothers, in the matriarchal lead role of Mrs. Johnstone. It was a part she debuted in 1997, and played regularly in the West End and occasionally on the National Tour, up to and including 2021. Paul starred in the show during its 10th anniversary celebrations and was also invited to play the role in Liverpool in 2008, when the city was given the title as the European Capital of Culture. Paul has received enormous personal and critical success in the show and in 2008 was voted the "undisputed Mrs J. of all time" by a Blood Brothers fansite as well as being awarded Best Actress in a Professional Production from the Alhambra Theatre Dunfermline.

In October 2012 Bill Kenwright announced that Blood Brothers was to close in London's West End after a 24-year run. For the final two weeks Kenwright put together his dream cast, including original cast members as well as those who appeared in the show on Broadway; he invited Paul back to reprise her role for one last time, an honour which Paul herself has acknowledged.

Most recently Paul reprised her acclaimed role for the 30th anniversary touring production of Blood Brothers, being hailed as the 'definitive Mrs Johnstone' and celebrating two decades association with the show.

Paul starred in the West End stage production of the Boy George musical Taboo, playing Josie James, a part rumoured to be specifically written for her in which she performed two of the show's stand out numbers "Talk Amongst Yourselves" and "Independent Woman". Her successes within the show led her to be invited to perform as the special guest at the Culture Club's 20th anniversary concert at The Royal Albert Hall, and on the live DVD. The release of the Original Cast Recording of Taboo was delayed so that Paul could be included on it.

Paul joined the cast of Footloose – the Musical! in the West End 2007 National Tour company in the role of Vi Moore. After the six-month tour, the cast re-opened the show at the Playhouse Theatre, London on 17 August 2007.

In 2003, Paul performed in a new workshop musical called The Biz!, playing the part of Amanda Power, a theatrical diva. The following year she performed in another new workshop musical written by Yusaf Islam, entitled Moonshadow with Ramin Karimloo. Paul has also played many principal roles in traditional pantomimes, her most recent being the title role in Dick Whittington and His Cat in the Theatre Royal Windsor's annual production performed during the 2001 Christmas season. She also lent vocals to a musical-concept album, for the stage adaptation of the film Alfie playing the role of Lily.

Paul has also turned to television acting, appearing as a semi-regular character – Freda Danby – in ITV's Emmerdale. She appeared in episodes of Doctors and In Deep on BBC TV; and the long-running series Holby City. As well as these acting roles, she performed Bring Him Home from Les Miserables on a Remembrance Sunday special edition of Songs of Praise and was also a contestant in a Eurovision Song Contest edition of The Weakest Link.

In 2011, she embarked on a nationwide tour of a new musical Rhinestone Mondays starring alongside Faye Tozer, Ian "H" Watkins and Shaun Williamson. She played the role of Sophie. The musical was said to be the first ever country and western jukebox musical to be created and, although the performances were generally well received with Paul singing classics such as "Stand By Your Man" and "Crazy", the show completed its run five weeks early.

In 2013 Paul starred alongside Will Young in the UK Tour of the West End revival of Kander and Ebb's musical Cabaret. Young reprised his Olivier Award nominated role of the Emcee whilst Paul played the part of Fraulein Schneider. Other cast members included Siobhan Dillon as Sally Bowles, Matt Rawle as Clifford Bradshaw and Linal Haft as Herr Shultz.

During the Christmas period of 2014 Paul joined the Tenth Anniversary production of the Cromer Pier Christmas Show — a traditional variety show including song, dance and comedy.

== Personal life ==
During the 1970s Paul dated pop star Rod Stewart. In 1980, she had a short-lived marriage to Liverpool night club owner Vincent McCaffrey.

She is now married to Alan Young, with whom she has a son, Ryan. Between 2006 and February 2007, the couple ran a pub, the Beehive, in Englefield Green, Surrey.

Her sister is the West End actress and choreographer Nikki Belsher, with whom she performed alongside in Footloose – the Musical!.

Paul is a keen supporter of the Alzheimer's Society. (Her mother, Doreen Belcher, died from disease in 2010). In 2011, she produced a Calendar Girls-style naked calendar in aid of the charity, alongside her fellow female Blood Brothers cast mates. The calendar was endorsed by both producer of the show, Bill Kenwright and playwright Willy Russell.

== Theatre and filmography (2000–present) ==
Year	Show	Role	Venue	Notes
2017	Magic at the Musicals	Herself	The Royal Albert Hall	
1997–2021	Blood Brothers	Mrs Johnstone	Phoenix Theatre and UK Tour	
2014	The Cromer Pier Christmas Show	Special Guest		Tenth Anniversary Production
2013	Cabaret	Fraulein Schneider	UK Tour	
2012	Sez Les, Volume 4	Performer		DVD
2011	Rhinestone Mondays	Sophie	UK Tour	
2011	The Wheeltappers and Shunters Social Club	Performer		DVD
2010	Daybreak	Herself	ITV	
2009	The Hour	Herself	STV	
2009	The Sound of The New Seekers	Performer		
2007	Footloose – The Musical	Vi Moore	Playhouse Theatre	
2007	Country Gals	Performer		DVD
2006	Holby City	Anita Powell	BBC	
2005	Charlie Rich and Friends, Legends in Concert	Performer		DVD
2005	Tammy Wynette/Various Artists	Performer		DVD
2005	Johnny Tillotson Rock'n'Roll Legends	Performer		DVD
2004	Moonshadow	Performer		
2004	The Weakest Link	Contestant	BBC	
2003	Taboo Original London Production	Josie James	The Venue	DVD
2003	The Biz!	Amanda Power	Thameside Theatre	
2003, 2005	Emmerdale	Freda Danby	ITV	
2002	Taboo	Josie James	The Venue	
2002	In Deep	Amanda	BBC	
2001	When You Wish	Performer		
2001	Dick Whittington	Dick Whittington	Theatre Royal Windsor	
2001	Doctors	Pam Howard	BBC	
2001	Songs of Praise	Performer	BBC	Remembrance day Special
