= Peter Doyle (singer) =

- Born: Peter John Doyle; 28 July 1949; Melbourne, Victoria, Australia
- Died: 13 October 2001 (aged 52) Castlemaine, Victoria, Australia
- Genres: Pop
- Occupation: Singer
- Instruments: Vocals, guitar
- Years active: 1958–2001
- Formerly of: The New Seekers

Peter John Doyle (28 July 1949 – 13 October 2001) was an Australian pop singer who had success with a number of Top 40 hits in Australia in the 1960s, then success internationally as a member of the New Seekers in the early 1970s, before resuming a solo career in 1973.

== Early career ==
He started his career at the age of 9 appearing on a children's television talent show called Swallow's Juniors and appeared as a regular on that show for the next five years. At the age of 10 he made his first recording on a 78 rpm acetate, "Lucky Devil"/"If Irish Eyes Were Shining". He was performing in Sunday afternoon pop shows at Melbourne's Festival Hall at the age of 14 and at 16 he was signed to a record contract with Ivan Dayman's Sunshine label (whose roster included top singers such as Normie Rowe and Tony Worsley). This led to regular appearances on Melbourne's teen TV show, "The Go!! Show".

== Australian pop star ==
From 1965 to 1967, he released ten 45 records in Australia, of which seven made the Top 40, the most successful of which were a cover of Conway Twitty's Speechless (The Pick Up), and a rousing version of Solomon Burke's Stupidity. He was backed by Melbourne band The Phantoms on all these recordings. He then recorded two singles with the band Grandmas Tonic as lead vocalist. His last two singles, once again under his own name, were for the Astor label although he was still backed on them by Grandma's Tonic,(ex-members of Tony Worsley's backing band 'The Fabulous Blue Jays').

May 1968 saw him join the vocal trio 'The Virgil Brothers', Australia's answer to The Walker Brothers. The Virgil Brothers released two singles in Australia in 1968, "Temptation 'Bout to Get Me" (a Top 5 hit) and "Here I Am". They then relocated to the UK where they recorded their third single, When You Walk Away, with producer David McKay. He then quit the trio which broke up soon after.

== With The New Seekers ==
In 1970, not long after the Virgil Brothers had dissolved, he joined the second line-up of The New Seekers, brought together by Keith Potger, a founding member of the old Seekers. This line-up had international hits with songs like Melanie Safka's "Look What They've Done to My Song Ma", "I'd Like to Teach the World to Sing", and a medley of songs from the Who's Pinball Wizard.

In 1972, The New Seekers came second representing the UK, in the Eurovision Song Contest with the song "Beg, Steal or Borrow", on which he duetted with his then girlfriend Lyn Paul, becoming the first Australian artist to represent the UK or participate in Eurovision for any nation. As well as sharing vocals in The New Seekers he was a talented songwriter and contributed many songs to their albums which included ballads such as "I Can Say You're Beautiful" and "Lay Me Down" and more up-tempo numbers like "Boom Town" and "Cincinnati".

== Later career and life ==
He quit The New Seekers, apparently disillusioned with lack of monetary rewards, in 1973 and resumed his solo career, as a singer-songwriter. He continued working in the UK until 1981, during which period he issued five solo singles, including a cover of The Easybeats "Friday on My Mind", and one album, Skin Deep. During this time in the UK he also recorded advertising jingles for Ribena and Sugar Puffs, provided the vocal for a children's single, "Jungle Ted and the Laceybuttonpoppers" and did backing vocals on Lyn Paul's UK Top 40 solo single, "It Oughta Sell A Million".

In 1975 Glen Wheatley asked Peter to join the Little River Band as lead vocalist, but at this stage Peter wanted to make his way as a solo performer and declined the offer.

By 1976, with the backing of David Mackay, Peter had secured a recording with RCA and his first single, released on 13 August 1976, was a version of the Easybeats' Friday on My Mind. This failed to chart, as did his follow up single, Skin Deep. His album, also entitled Skin Deep, released in 1977, included a variety of musical styles and six songs penned by Peter, but this too failed to provide him with solo success. It was around this time that Peter met Jane Gent ( nee Garner ), who later became his wife.

Two singles were issued on the independent Limelight label in 1980: the first of these was a cover of Peter McCann's US hit "Do You Wanna Make Love". This song, ironically, had also been covered two years earlier by The New Seekers with Peter Doyle's replacement, Danny Finn, on lead vocal.

Peter returned to Australia in 1981 to work with a band called Standing Room Only. In 1982, ex-Wings drummer, Steve Holly, invited him to join the group Regis in the US, where he worked for the next five years.

Returning to Australia in 1987, Doyle regularly performed on the club circuit. From 1991 to 1993, he was a member of the Ram Band in Melbourne, providing vocals, played bass and keyboards. He appeared with The Ram Band on the "Living Legends Live Benefit Concert" Filmed and Recorded at The Palace Entertainment Complex St Kilda in May 1992. Four original songs written by John van Boxtel and recorded by Doyle on his 4-track tape deck at his home in 1991 are the last known original new song demos he performed. His musical career was curtailed when he suffered ill-health later in the 1990s.

== Death ==
He died in Castlemaine, Victoria, of throat cancer, on 13 October 2001. He is buried at Muckleford Cemetery.

== Discography ==
=== Singles ===
==== Peter Doyle – solo ====
- "Stupidity" / "Heigh Ho" 1965 (#6 Melbourne)
- "Speechless (The Pick up)" / "Like I Love You" 1965 (#8 Melbourne)
- "Whatcha Gonna Do About It" / "Do It Zula Style" 1965 (#27 Melbourne)
- "Stupidity & Speechless" (EP) – 1965 – Heigh-Ho / Stupidity / Like I Love You / Speechless
- "The Great Pretender" / "Everybody Loves a Lover" 1966 (#11 Melbourne, No. 28 Brisbane)
- "Something You Got Baby" / "Go Away" 1966
- "Mr Good Time" / "Tweedle Dee" 1966
- "The Great Pretender" (EP) -1966 – The Great Pretender/ Something About You/ Everybody Loves A Lover/ Is This The Dream ?
- "If You Can Put That in a Bottle" / "I'm not the Boy You're After" 1967
- "Plastic Dreams Toy Balloons" 1967–68 (#23 Melbourne)
- "Rusty Hands of Time" / "And So in Life" 1973
- "Friday on My Mind" / "We Believe in Lovin'" 1976
- "Skin Deep" / "We Believe in Lovin'" 1977
- "Do You Wanna Make Love" / "Wake up With Me" 1980
- "This and That" / "It's all Over" 1980

==== Grandma's Tonic ====
Peter Doyle (lead vocalist)

- Hi Hi Hazel/Johnny The Hummer 1967 (#36 Brisbane)
- Lost Girl/ I Know 1967 (#38 Brisbane)

==== The Virgil Brothers ====
- Temptation 'Bout To Get Me/I See Her Face −1968 (#6 Brisbane, No. 13 Melbourne)
- Temptation 'Bout To Get Me/Look Away/When You Walk Away/Good Love (EP)
- Here I Am/Shake Me Wake Me – 1968
- Temptation 'Bout To Get Me/Look Away – 1969
- When You Walk Away/Good Love – 1969

==== The New Seekers ====
- See The New Seekers

==== Jungle Ted ====
Peter Doyle on lead vocal

- Jungle Ted & The Laceybuttonpoppers 1974

=== Albums ===
==== Peter Doyle – solo ====
- Peter's First Album – 1966
- Skin Deep – 1977
- Festival Files: Speechless Vol.16 – 1989
- Rarities – 2004

==== Appearances on compilation albums ====
- The Bowl Show – 1965–66 – includes two tracks – Heigh Ho/Stupidity
- The Big Four – 1965–66 – includes four tracks – Speechless/ Stupidity/Like I Love/Heigh-Ho
- Sunshine All Star Spectacular – 1967 – two tracks – High Time Baby/Lovey Dovey
- Festivals 10 Years of Hits – 1968 – one track – The Great Pretender
- The Big Parade 1967 – one track – Stupidity
- Ugly Things Vol.2 – 1983 – two tracks – Grandmas Tonic – Lost Girl
- Sixties Downunder Vol.3 – 1998 – one track – Stupidity
- Hot Generation – 2002 – one track – High Time Baby
- Devil's Children Vol.3 – one track – Tweedlee Dee
