= Marty Kristian =

German-born, British-based musician (born 1947)

- Born: Martins Vanags; 27 May 1947 (age 78); Leipzig, Germany
- Origin: Melbourne, Australia
- Genres: Pop
- Occupation: Singer-songwriter
- Instruments: Vocals, guitar, banjo
- Years active: 1965–2011

Marty Kristian (born Martins Vanags on 27 May 1947) is a German-born, British-based musician. He grew up, and started his musical career, in Australia, as a solo artist. He is a singer-songwriter-guitarist and, in the 1970s, he became a heartthrob as a founding member of the New Seekers (1969–74, 1976–2002).

== Biography ==
Martins Vanags was born in Leipzig, Germany in 1947 to Latvian-born parents, Paul and Rute "Ruth" Vanags. His father died before he turned one-year-old and he migrated to Australia with his mother in 1950. He attended Northcote High School for secondary education and then started a course in architecture at Melbourne University. He left after a year when his widowed mother became ill and worked as a trainee draughtsman to support her.

Kristian played with local bands in his spare time – his breakthrough came when he appeared on TV pop music series, The Go!! Show. His debut single, "We Didn't Ask to Be Brought Here", a cover version of Bobby Darin's 1965 hit, was issued in 1966. In August he performed Bob Dylan's "One Too Many Mornings" on The Go!! Show.

Kristian supported a local tour by United Kingdom pop singer, Crispian St. Peters. In March 1967 he released his second single, "I'll Give You Love", a song written and produced by St. Peters. He explained to Beverley Cooper of The Australian Women's Weekly why he had to leave his day job, "I wasn't getting enough sleep. Sometimes I would be out singing until two a.m. Then I had to get up and be in my office at nine in the morning. It was too much." Aside from singing he contributed to his performance style by designing his own clothing, "I like clothes that bring out the personality of the wearer... I don't go for bright colors. I think the real modern look depends on cut rather than color." Cooper described his favourite look as a "military style jacket with bell-bottom trousers."

In Australia he issued two further solo singles, "It Comes and Goes" (1967) and "The Inn-Keeper's Daughter" (1968), before taking a singing gig on a cruise ship and relocating to the UK. In late 1969 Kristian, on lead guitar, backing vocals and occasional lead vocals, became a founder of the New Seekers, which were a pop rock group assembled in London by Keith Potger (ex-the Seekers) and David Joseph, a talent manager. The group's fellow founders were Chris Barrington on bass guitar and backing vocals, Eve Graham on lead vocals, Sally Graham (no relation) on lead vocals, and Laurie Heath on guitar and backing vocals. Potger, initially a member as singer and producer for the group, left to become their manager by the end of 1970.

As a band member Kristian wrote or co-wrote tracks for the New Seekers, including "Hello Again", "One More Sunny Day" (both 1969), "Idaho", "Reap What You Sow", "Mystic Queen" (all three, 1972), "Country Lovin'", "Hey Look High" and "I've Got Your Number". The group broke up in May 1974. Late in 1973 Kristian had formed a side project, Peter Paul & Marty, with the New Seekers' band mates, Peter Oliver and Paul Layton. They released their debut self-titled album and a single, "Crying in the Rain" (a cover version of the Everly Brothers song), while still members of the parent band.

Kristian, Eve Graham and Layton reconvened the New Seekers in 1976 with Kathy Ann Rae and Danny Finn joining. According to Steve Huey of AllMusic, "Kristian and Layton continued to lead various New Seekers lineups into the '80s and sporadically during the '90s, but despite continued world tours, they were strictly a nostalgia act." He left the group in February 2002 and was replaced by Mark Hankins. On 28 February 2011 Kristian released an album of demo recordings, Echoes.

=== Personal life ===
Marty Kristian married his partner, Carol, in a London ceremony in June 1975. They have two sons, James and Oliver. Carol ran a dog grooming salon in the London area.

James Kristian has acted in television programmes, including the BBC Television series, Doctors. He played the part of Allen Rissbrook in As If.

== Discography ==
=== Albums ===
- Peter Paul & Marty (Polydor 2383 238) 1973

=== Singles ===
Year	Single	Chart Positions	Catalogue
Year	Single	AUS	Catalogue
1966	"We Didn't Ask to Be Brought Here"	47	CBS BA-221318
1966	"I'll Give You Love"	49	CBS BA-221358
1967	"It Comes and Goes"	58	CBS BA-221420
1968	"The Inn-Keeper's Daughter"	-	CBS BA-221505
1973	"Crying in the Rain" (as Peter, Paul & Marty)	-	Polydor 2058 394
