= Paul Layton =

English musician and former child actor (born 1947)

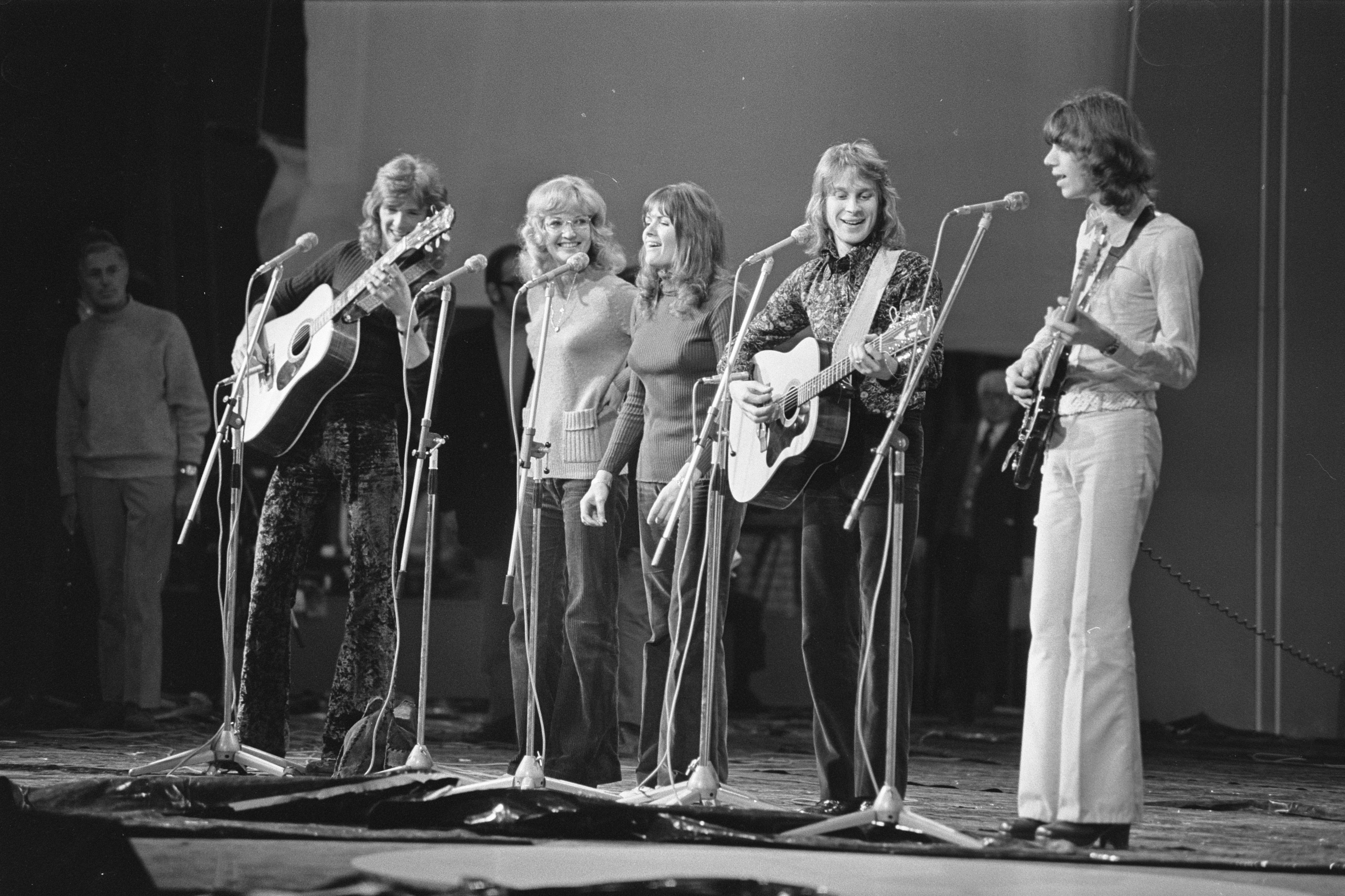
- Layton (right) performing with the New Seekers in 1972

Background information
- Born: Paul Martin Layton; 4 August 1947 (age 79); Beaconsfield, Buckinghamshire, England
- Occupations: Musician, singer, songwriter, actor
- Years active: 1962–present

Paul Martin Layton (born 4 August 1947) is an English musician and former child actor. He was the bassist and vocalist of the group The New Seekers.

== Biography ==
=== Acting ===
Layton studied acting, leaving school at fourteen to train at the Aida Foster Stage School. As a teenager he had parts in the films I Could Go On Singing (with Judy Garland), and Beckett; and television appearances in Dixon of Dock Green and Emergency Ward 10 amongst the three hundred in which he had acted in by the age of seventeen.

=== Music ===
Layton secured a recording contract in 1969, and released his first single "Mister Mister". The single was produced by Ossie Byrne, who was responsible for bringing the Bee Gees over to the UK from Australia. "Mister Mister" was a minor success in the Netherlands. Byrne was told by Marty Kristian that The New Seekers were looking for a bass guitarist, and informed Layton who was accepted into the group.

The New Seekers were about to begin a summer season at Great Yarmouth in 1970, when original group members Sally, Chris and Laurie decided to leave. New recruits Layton, Lyn Paul and Peter Doyle rehearsed for a fortnight with their musical director, Colin May. Layton originally auditioned for guitarist, but was chosen as their new bass guitarist instead. The New Seekers version of "What Have They Done to my Song Ma?" was selling well in the US having been recorded prior to the change in line-up. The three new performers began life with the group as it entered a successful and busy period, splitting their time between visits to the States and Europe. They played on a number of television programmes in the US, such as The Ed Sullivan Show and The Andy Williams Show. Layton remained a member of The New Seekers until their end in 2010.
