= David Mackay (producer) =

Australian record producer, arranger and musical director (born 1944)

- Born: 11 May 1944 (age 82); Sydney, New South Wales, Australia
- Genres: Pop, soft rock
- Occupations: Record producer; musical director; recording engineer; songwriter
- Labels: EMI, Polydor Records

David Mackay (born 11 May 1944) is an Australian record producer, arranger and musical director. He began his music career at the age of 15 in a production of Bye Bye Birdie for J. C. Williamson Theatre Company. He also worked for a time recording musical sessions for local radio.

== Career ==
He was classically trained at Sydney Conservatorium of Music, where he studied piano, clarinet, theory and composition.

Mackay was later head-hunted by EMI Australia, which initially employed him as a Recording Engineer but soon promoted him to "Head of Artists and Repertoire". During this time, Mackay was responsible for producing 30 hit singles and discovering some of Australia's most popular pop acts; he is probably best known in Australia as the producer of most of the Australian recordings made by The Twilights, one of Australia's most popular bands of the mid-1960s; his credits include the band's ambitious swansong Once Upon A Twilight. Mackay's Australian commercial success led to an internal transfer to the firm's United Kingdom offices, where Mackay went on to work at the legendary Abbey Road studios.

Mackay eventually left EMI to set up his own independent company, June Productions Ltd. He also diversified into the medium of television, arranging and producing themes such as Coca-Cola's "I'd Like To Teach The World To Sing" as well as scores for BBC TV shows Auf Wiedersehen, Pet, Carla Lane's Bread, Streets Apart and As Time Goes By. The Auf Wiedersehen, Pet project notably generated a hit single, "That's Livin' Alright", by Joe Fagin, which won Mackay an Ivor Novello Award and a BAFTA nomination. In both 1972 and 1973, Mackay conducted the orchestra for the UK's entries in the Eurovision Song Contest.

The World Starts Tonight (1977) is the debut studio album by Welsh singer Bonnie Tyler, released in February 1977 by RCA Records. Most of the songs were written by Ronnie Scott and Steve Wolfe, who worked as her managers while she was signed to RCA. They also produced the album alongside David Mackay. Musically, the album features country and pop songs. Natural Force (1978) is the second studio album by Tyler, released in May 1978 by RCA Records. In the United States, the album was titled It's a Heartache. As with her debut, Ronnie Scott and Steve Wolfe wrote most of the tracks on the album. David Mackay returned again to produce, with Scott and Wolfe.

In 1990, Mackay and Jon English co-wrote a concept album, Paris, which has since been staged as a rock musical in Australia and elsewhere several times beginning in 2003. In 2002, Mackay's career came full circle as he returned to the world of musical theatre as a supervisor to a West End theatre production of 125th Street.

In 2018, Bonnie Tyler announced that she would be working with Mackay, who co-produced her first two albums. Tyler and Mackay also collaborated on Frankie Miller's album Double Take (2016). In March 2019, Between the Earth and the Stars was released as the seventeenth studio album by Bonnie Tyler, and was produced by Mackay.

== Selected UK, US and Australian discography ==
=== Singles ===
- "Carousel of Love" by Peter Best (1967)
- "The Pushbike Song" by The Mixtures (1970 UK #2 / AUS #1)
- "Never Ending Song of Love" by The New Seekers (1971 UK #2)
- "I'd Like to Teach the World to Sing (In Perfect Harmony)" by The New Seekers (1971 UK #1 / US #7)
- "Beg, Steal or Borrow" by The New Seekers (1972 UK #2 / US #81)
- "Power to All Our Friends" by Cliff Richard (1973 UK #4 / AUS #31 / US #109)
- "Baby We Can't Go Wrong" by Cilla Black (1974 UK #36)
- "(You Keep Me) Hangin' On" by Cliff Richard (1974 UK #13)
- "Trans Canada Highway" by Gene Pitney (1975 AUS #14)
- "More Than a Lover" by Bonnie Tyler (1977 UK #27)
- "It's a Heartache " by Bonnie Tyler (1978 UK #4 / US #3 / AUS #1)
- "Baby Blue" by Dusty Springfield (1979 UK #61)
- "Lost in Love" by Demis Roussos (1980)
- "Save Me" by Johnny Logan (1980)
- "Love's Alive" by Vicky Leandros (1981)
- "Your Love Still Brings Me To My Knees" by Dusty Springfield (1980)
- "Your Love Still Brings Me to My Knees" by Marcia Hines (1981 AUS #10)
- "What a Bitch is Love" by Marcia Hines (1981 AUS #51)
- "Breakin' Away/That's Living Alright" by Joe Fagin (1983 UK #3)
- "It Should've Been Me" by David Ride ( 1987 Warner)
- "Theme From Neighbours" by Dame Edna Everage (1988)
- "Hold On" by Bonnie Tyler (2019)
- "Life will unfold" by C.B. Green (2022)
- "Suddenly" by C.B. Green (2022)

=== Albums ===
- The Happy Prince by the La De Da's (EMI/Columbia Aust., 1968)
- Laughing Cavalier by The Wallace Collection (1968)
- We'd Like to Teach the World to Sing by The New Seekers (1971 UK #2)
- Circles by The New Seekers (1972 UK #23)
- Now by The New Seekers (1973 UK #47)
- Only When I Laugh by Blue Mink (1973)
- Take Me High: Soundtrack by Cliff Richard (1973 UK #41)
- Fruity by Blue Mink (1974)
- 31st Of February Street by Cliff Richard (1974)
- In My Life by Cilla Black (1974)
- It Makes Me Feel Good by Cilla Black (1976)
- Tarney & Spencer by Alan Tarney and Trevor Spencer (1976)
- The World Starts Tonight by Bonnie Tyler (1977)
- Natural Force by Bonnie Tyler (1978 US #16 1978)
- Take it From the Boys by Marcia Hines (1981 AUS #16)
- Paris by Jon English and David Mackay
- Between the Earth and the Stars by Bonnie Tyler (2019 UK #34)
- The Best Is Yet to Come by Bonnie Tyler (2021)

== Awards ==
=== ARIA Music Awards ===
The ARIA Music Awards is an annual awards ceremony that recognises excellence, innovation, and achievement across all genres of Australian music. They commenced in 1987.

Year	Nominee / work	Award	Result
ARIA Music Awards of 1991	Paris (with Jon English)	Best Original Soundtrack, Cast or Show Album	Won
ARIA Music Awards of 1991	Paris (with Jon English)	Best Adult Contemporary Album	Nominated
