= Marcia Hines discography =

Artist discography

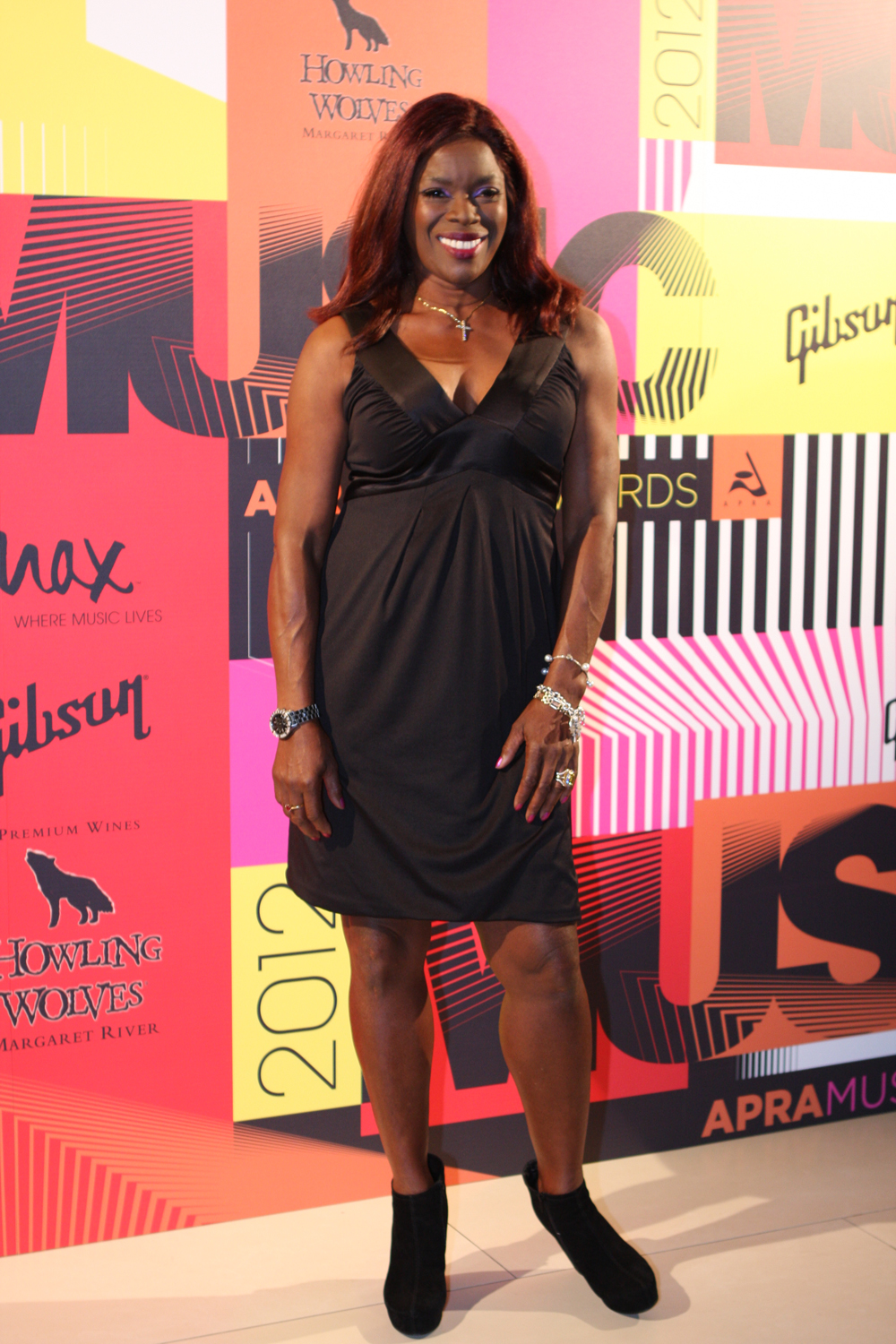
- Hines at the APRA Music Awards of 2012
- Studio albums: 15
- Live albums: 1
- Compilation albums: 9
- Singles: 49

The discography of Australian R&B and pop music recording artist Marcia Hines consists of fifteen studio albums, one live album, nine compilation album and forty-nine singles.

Hines has sold 2.6 million albums, was inducted into the ARIA Hall of Fame in 2007 and awarded the Order of Australia in 2009. She was the first Australian female artist to have a platinum-selling album, as well as the first female to have seven consecutive top 20 album releases.

== Studio albums ==
List of albums, with selected chart positions and certifications
Title	Album details	Peak chart positions	Certifications
Title	Album details	AUS	Certifications
Marcia Shines	Released: October 1975; Format: LP; Label: Wizard Records	4	AUS: Platinum
Shining	Released: November 1976; Format: LP; Label: Miracle Records	3	AUS: 2× Gold
Ladies and Gentlemen	Released: August 1977; Format: LP; Label: Miracle Records	6	
Ooh Child	Released: June 1979; Format: LP; Label: Miracle Records	15	
Take It from the Boys	Released: September 1981; Format: LP; Label: Midnight Records	16	
Jokers and Queens (with Jon English)	Released: July 1982; Format: LP, cassette; Label: Midnight Records	36	
Love Sides	Released: late 1982; Format: LP, cassette; Label: Midnight Records	—	
Right Here and Now	Released: October 1994; Format: CD; Label: Warner Music Australia	21	
Time of Our Lives	Released: 28 July 1999; Format: CD, digital download; Label: Warner Music Australia	17	
Hinesight	Released: September 2004; Format: CD, digital download; Label: BMG	12	
Discothèque	Released: 30 September 2006; Format: CD, digital download; Label: Warner Music Australia, Liberation Music	6	ARIA: Gold
Life	Released: 17 November 2007; Format: CD, digital download; Label: Warner Music Australia	21	
Marcia Sings Tapestry	Released: 1 October 2010; Format: CD, digital download; Label: Universal Music	16	
Amazing	Released: 4 April 2014; Format: CD, digital download; Label: Ambition Entertainment	27	
The Gospel According to Marcia	Released: 3 November 2023; Format: CD, digital download; Label: ABC Music	—	
"—" denotes releases that did not chart, or have no reliable sources of charting information.

== Compilation albums ==
List of albums, with selected chart positions and certifications
Title	Album details	Peak chart positions	Certifications
Title	Album details	AUS	Certifications
Greatest Hits	Released: December 1981; Format: LP, cassette; Label: Wizard Records (Wizlp1001)	2	AUS: Platinum
Greatest Hits Volume 2	Released: 1982; Format: LP, cassette; Label: Wizard Records (Wizlp2001)	—	
With All My Love	Released: 1983; Format: LP, cassette; Label: Wizard Records (Wizlp2004)	63	
The Collection	Released: 1984; Format: LP, cassette; Label: Axis (AX-260314)	—	
Complete Marcia Hines 1975–1984	Released: 1985; Format: LP; Label: Hammard, Wizard Records (HAM113)	59	
The Ultimate Collection	Released: November 1994; Format: CD, cassette; Label:	196	
Music Is My Life: The Ultimate Collection	Releases: March 1998; Format CD; Label BMG (74321530962)	193	
Queen of Pop	Released: November 2000; Format: CD; Label: BMG (74321754852)	—	
Diva	Released: 8 October 2001; Format: CD; Label: Warner Music Australia	75	
Marcia: Greatest Hits 1975–1983	Released: 22 November 2004; Format: CD; Label: BMG	67	
The Essential Marcia Hines	Released: 30 July 2007; Format: CD, digital download; Label: Sony/ BMG Australia	—	
Still Shining: The 50th Anniversary Ultimate Collection	Released: 7 July 2023; Format: CD, digital download; Label: ABC Music	—	
"—" denotes releases that did not chart, or have no reliable sources of charting information.

== Live albums ==
List of albums, with selected chart positions and certifications
Title	Album details	Peak chart positions
Title	Album details	AUS
Marcia Hines Live Across Australia	Released: February 1978; Format: LP; Label: Miracle Records	7

== Singles ==
List of singles, with selected chart positions
Year	Title	Peak chart positions			Album
Year	Title	AUS	NLD	NZ	Album
1975	"Fire and Rain" b/w "You"	17	—	—	Marcia Shines
1975	"From the Inside" / "Jumpin' Jack Flash"	10	—	—	Marcia Shines
1976	"Don't Let the Grass Grow" / "You Gotta Let Go"	85	—	—	Marcia Shines
1976	"Trilogy" / "I Just Don't Know What to Do with Myself"	6	—	—	Marcia Shines / Shining
1976	"Shining" / "In a Mellow Mood" (NZ only)	—N/a	—N/a	—	Shining
1976	"(Until) Your Love Broke Through" / "Whatever Goes Around"	38	—	—	Shining
1977	"What I Did for Love" / "A Love Story"	6	—	—	Ladies and Gentlemen
1977	"You" / "In a Mellow Mood"	2	—	—	Ladies and Gentlemen
1978	"Music Is My Life" b/w "Empty" (live)	28	—	—	Marcia Hines Live Across Australia
1978	"Imagination" (live) b/w "Shining"(live)	—	—	—	Marcia Hines Live Across Australia
1978	"Let the Music Play" / "Empty"	92	—	—	Ooh Child
1979	"Something's Missing (In My Life)" / "Moments"	9	—	5	Ooh Child
1979	"Where Did We Go Wrong?" / "Dance Fool, Dance"	62	—	—	Ooh Child
1980	"Ooh Child" b/w "Dance Fool Dance" (featuring Monalisa and Terry Young) (EU only)	—N/a	—	—N/a	Ooh Child (European edition)
1980	"Save the Last Dance for Me" b/w "Moment" (EU only)	—N/a	—	—N/a	Ooh Child (European edition)
1980	"You're So Good" b/w "I Wanna Make It With You Tonight" (EU only)	—N/a	—	—N/a	Ooh Child (European edition)
1981	"Your Love Still Brings Me to My Knees" b/w "Till It's Too Late"	10	6	—	Take It from the Boys
1981	"What a Bitch Is Love" b/w "It Don't Take Much"	51	—	—	Take It from the Boys
1981	"Many Rivers to Cross" b/w "I Like It with You" (EU only)	—N/a	23	—N/a	Take It from the Boys
1982	"Take It from the Boys" / "Taking It All in Stride"	—	—	—	Take It from the Boys
1982	"Jokers & Queens" (with Jon English) b/w "The Best of Me"	62	—	—	Jokers & Queens
1982	"She Got You" b/w "Come Hell or Waters High" (EU only)	—N/a	—	—N/a	Love Sides
1982	"Love Side" b/w "The Best of Me" or "Heart like a Radio"	—	—	—	Love Sides
1982	"Heart Like a Radio" b/w "Lavender Mountain" or "She Got You"	—	—	—	Love Sides
1983	"Baby Blue" b/w "Lavender Mountain" or "I Remember" (EU only)	—N/a	—	—N/a	Love Sides
1988	"The Lord's Prayer"	—	—	—	African Sanctus (David Fanshawe album)
1994	"Rain (Let the Children Play)"	47	—	35	Right Here and Now
1994	"Give It All You Got"	53	—	—	Right Here and Now
1998	"What a Feeling"	66	—	23	Time of Our Lives
1999	"Makin' My Way"	71	—	—	Time of Our Lives
1999	"Time of Our Lives"	31	—	—	Time of Our Lives
2000	"Woo Me"	56	—	—	Time of Our Lives
2000	"Rise"	116	—	—	Diva
2001	"(I've Got To) Believe"	172	—	—	Diva
2003	"To Love Somebody" (with Brian Cadd, Max Merritt and Doug Parkinson)	96	—	—	Non-album single
2004	"Ain't Nobody"	—	—	—	Hinesight
2005	"You (2005 Remix)"	59	—	—	Discoteque (Tour Edition)
2006	"Disco Inferno"	—	—	—	Discothèque
2006	"Stomp!" (with Deni Hines)	43	—	—	Discothèque
2007	"I'm Coming Out"	—^{[a]}	—	—	Discothèque
2007	"Get Here If You Can"	—	—	—	Life
2014	"Amazing"	—	—	—	Amazing
2014	"Remedy" (with Russell Crowe)	—	—	—	Amazing
2014	"Heartache" (with Titanium)	—	—	—	Amazing
2023	"Last One Standing"	—	—	—	Still Shining: The 50th Anniversary Ultimate Collection
2023	"Lean on Me"	—	—	—	The Gospel According to Marcia
2023	"Loves Me Like a Rock"	—	—	—	The Gospel According to Marcia
2024	"I've Got the Music in Me" (with Sgt Slick)	—	—	—	
2025	"Christmas is Groove"	—	—	—	
2026	"Something Stupid" (with William Le Brun)	—	—	—	
"—" denotes releases that did not chart, or have no reliable sources of charting information.

a "I'm Coming Out" peaked at number 41 in Australian Club singles chart.

== Other appearances ==
List of other non-single song appearances
Title	Year	Album
various songs	1973	Jesus Christ Superstar; Live At The Capitol Theatre Sydney 1973
"Do You Know What It Means to Miss New Orleans?"	1975	Daly-Wilson Big Band
"Ain't No Mountain High Enough"	1975	Daly-Wilson Big Band
"You" (live)	1979	The Concert of the Decade
"Movin' On" (Featuring the girls of Australian Idol)	2003	"Rise Up" (Australian Idol single) / The Final 12
"Reach Out & Touch (Somebodys Hand)"	2005	The Spirit of Christmas 2005
"Fire & Rain" (live)	2009	Sound Relief
"Boogie Wonderland"	2015	Velvet
"Never Knew Love Like This Before"	2015	Velvet
"It's Raining Men"	2015	Velvet
"You Medley" (with Brendan Maclean)	2015	Velvet
"No More Tears (Enough Is Enough)" (with Brendan Maclean)	2015	Velvet
"Last Dance"	2015	Velvet
"You" (live)	2018	Countdown: Live at The Sydney Opera House
"Disco Inferno" (live)	2018	Countdown: Live at The Sydney Opera House
