= Still Shining: The 50th Anniversary Ultimate Collection =

Greatest hits album by Marcia Hines
- Released: 7 July 2023
- Recorded: 1973–2022
- Label: ABC Music

Marcia Hines chronology
Amazing (2014)	Still Shining: The 50th Anniversary Ultimate Collection (2023)	The Gospel According to Marcia (2023)

Singles from Still Shining: The 50th Anniversary Ultimate Collection
- 1. "Last One Standing" Released: 7 July 2023

Still Shining: The 50th Anniversary Ultimate Collection is a greatest hits compilation album by Australian recording artist Marcia Hines, released on 7 July 2023.

In a statement, Hines said, "I have to admit that the release of Still Shining is as exciting as the release of my very first album. Honestly, some things never get old … It's an honour to still be releasing music and playing to live audiences around the country".

The album was supported by an Australian tour from July to November 2023.

== Track listing ==
Still Shining
No.	Title	Writer(s)	Original album	Length
1.	"Fire and Rain"	James Taylor	Marcia Shines	4:43
2.	"From the Inside"	Artie Wayne	Marcia Shines	3:27
3.	"Shining"	Jill Wagner; Robie Porter	Shining	3:39
4.	"Something's Missing (In My Life)"	Paul Jabara	Ooh Child	4:38
5.	"I Just Don't Know What to Do with Myself"	Burt Bacharach; Hal David	Shining	3:07
6.	"What I Did For Love"	Marvin Hamlisch; Edward Kleban	Ladies and Gentlemen	3:08
7.	"You"	Tom Snow	Ladies and Gentlemen	3:08
8.	"Jumpin' Jack Flash" (live) (digital version only)	Jagger–Richards	Marcia Hines Live Across Australia	3"06
9.	"I've Got the Music in Me" (live) (digital version only)	Bias Boshell	Marcia Hines Live Across Australia	4:12
10.	"Your Love Still Brings Me to My Knees"	Bobby Wood; Roger Cook	Take It from the Boys	3:52
11.	"Jokers & Queens" (with Jon English)	Jon English; Charlie Hull	Jokers and Queens	3:39
12.	"Heart Like a Radio"	Allee Willis; Don Yowell; David Lasley	Love Sides	3:48
13.	"Rain (Let the Children Play)"	Robyn Smith	Right Here and Now	3:32
14.	"Time of Our Lives"	Charlie Mole; Gerry DeVeaux	Time of Our Lives	3:54
15.	"Rise"	Jose McLaughlan; Mark Holden; Paul Wiltshire; Shane Monopoli	Diva	3:32
16.	"Stomp!" (with Deni Hines)	Louis Johnson; George Johnson; Valerie Johnson; Rod Temperton	Discotheque	4:25
17.	"Disco Inferno"	Leroy Green; Ron Kersey	Discotheque	3:48
18.	"Remedy" (with Russell Crowe)	Tom Diesel; Marcia Hines; Ron E. Jones	Amazing	3:26
19.	"Amazing"	Diesel; Hines; Jones	Amazing	3:33
20.	"Heartache"	Diesel; Hines; Jones	Amazing	4:01
21.	"Last One Standing"	Michael Fatkin	new recording	3:18
22.	"Hard to Breathe"	Fatkin	new recording	3:23

== Charts ==
Still Shining: The 50th Anniversary Ultimate Collection did not reach the ARIA top 100, but peaked at number 5 on the Australian Independent Label Albums chart.

Chart (2023)	Peak position
Australian Independent Label Albums (AIR)	5

== Release history ==
Release history of Still Shining: The 50th Anniversary Ultimate Collection
Region	Date	Format	Label	Catalogue	Reference
Worldwide	7 July 2023	streaming, digital download	ABC Music	—N/a	
Australia	28 July 2023	CD	ABC Music	ABCM0014	
