= Marcia: Greatest Hits 1975–1983 =

Compilation album by Marcia Hines
- Released: 22 November 2004
- Recorded: 1975–1983
- Genre: Pop rock, funk, soul, disco
- Label: BMG, Sony Music Australia
- Producer: Robie Porter, David Mackay

Marcia Hines chronology
| Hinesight (2004) | Marcia: Greatest Hits 1975–1983 (2004) | Discothèque (2006) |

Professional ratings
Review scores
| Source | Rating |
|---|---|
| AllMusic | 4/5 stars |

Marcia: Greatest Hits 1975–1983 is a compilation album released on 22 November 2004. It was released just two months after the release of Hinesight.

The album contains tracks taken from the albums, Marcia Shines, Shining, Ladies and Gentlemen, Ooh Child, Take it From the Boys and Love Sides.

In 2020, the album was released digitally with a slightly altered track listing. The first 17 songs are the same, but tracks 18-27 were not on the original release.

== Track listing ==
Standard edition

1. "Fire and Rain" (4:44)
2. "From the Inside" (3:28)
3. "Trilogy" (4:20)
4. "Don't Let the Grass Grow" (2:59)
5. "I Just Don't Know What to Do with Myself" (3:08)
6. "Shining" (3:41)
7. "(Until) Your Love Broke Through" (3:17)
8. "Empty" (2:35)
9. "A Love Story" (3:33)
10. "I've Got the Music in Me" (4:12)
11. "What I Did for Love" (3:17)
12. "You" (3:12)
13. "I Don't Know How to Love Him" (3:48)
14. "Music Is My Life" (2:08)
15. "Let the Music Play" (4:29)
16. "Something's Missing (In My Life)" (4:38)
17. "Where Did We Go Wrong" (4:04)
18. "Your Love Still Brings Me to My Knees" (3:33)
19. "What a Bitch Is Love" (3:50)
20. "Heart Like a Radio" (3:51)

2020 Digital Edition

1. "Fire and Rain" (4:44)
2. "From the Inside" (3:28)
3. "Trilogy" (4:20)
4. "Don’t Let the Grass Grow" (2:59)
5. "I Just Don't Know What to Do with Myself" (3:08)
6. "Shining" (3:41)
7. "(Until) Your Love Broke Through" (3:17)
8. "Empty" (2:35)
9. "A Love Story" (3:33)
10. "I've Got the Music In Me" (4:12)
11. "What I Did for Love" (3:17)
12. "You" (3:12)
13. "I Don't Know How to Love Him" (3:48)
14. "Music Is My Life" (2:08)
15. "Let the Music Play" (4:29)
16. "Something's Missing (In My Life)" (4:38)
17. "Where Did We Go Wrong" (4:04)
18. "You Gotta Go" (3:30)
19. "Jumpin' Jack Flash" (3:18)
20. "Dance You Fool Dance" (5:19)
21. "Whatever Goes Around" (2:58)
22. "Signed, Sealed, Delivered, I'm Yours" (3:30)
23. "In a Mellow Mood" (2:38)
24. "Believe in Me" (1:41)
25. "Moments" (3:27)
26. "You" (2005 remix) (3:24)
27. "April Sun in Cuba" (3"34

== Weekly charts ==
Marcia: Greatest Hits 1975-1983 debuted at 92 and peaked at 67 on 13 December 2004.

| Chart (2004) | Peak position |
|---|---|
| ARIA Albums Chart | 67 |

== Release history ==
| Region | Date | Format | Label | Catalogue |
|---|---|---|---|---|
| Australia | 22 November 2004 | CD | Sony BMG Australia | 82876653702 |
| Australia | March 2020 | streaming | Sony Music Australia | |
