= Queen of Pop (album) =

Compilation album by Marcia Hines
- Released: November 2000
- Recorded: 1975–1979
- Genre: Pop rock; funk; soul; disco
- Length: 69:56
- Label: BMG

Marcia Hines chronology
Time of Our Lives (1999)	Queen of Pop (2000)	Diva (2001)

Queen of Pop is a compilation album of songs recorded by Australian singer-songwriter Marcia Hines on the Wizard Record label between 1975 and 1979. The album was released in November 2000 by BMG records.

The title pays tribute to the "Queen of Pop" award she won three consecutive years between 1976 and 1978.

== Track listing ==
1. "You" (Tom Snow) – 3:17
2. "What I Did for Love (Marvin Hamlisch, Edward Kleban) – 3:10
3. "Shining" (Jill Wagner, Robie Porter) – 3:42
4. "Moments" (Rick Springfield) – 3:26
5. "Jumpin' Jack Flash (Mick Jagger, Keith Richards) – 3:18
6. "I Just Don't Know What to Do With Myself" – 3:07
7. "I Don't Know How to Love Him" (Tim Rice, Andrew Lloyd Webber) – 3:49
8. "Fire and Rain" (James Taylor) – 4:46
9. "Don't Let the Grass Grow" (David Buskin) – 2:59
10. "April Sun in Cuba" (Paul Hewson, Marc Hunter) – 3:46
11. "Where Did We Go Wrong" (Burt Bacharach, Hal David) – 4:06
12. "Something's Missing (In My Life)" (Paul Jabara) – 4:41
13. "Music Is My Life" (Robie Porter) – 2:10
14. "Let the Music Play" (Bias Boshell) – 4:27
15. "I've Got the Music in Me" (Bias Boshell) – 4:06
16. "Imagination" (Robie Porter) – 3:51
17. "From the Inside" (Artie Wayne) – 3:36
18. "Empty" (Robie Porter) – 2:37
19. "Believe in Me" (Robie Porter) – 1:43
20. "(Until) Your Love Broke Through" (Bias Boshell) – 3:19

== Release history ==
Region	Date	Format	Label	Catalogue
Australia	2000	CD	BMG	74321754852
