= Diva (Marcia Hines album) =

Compilation album by Marcia Hines
- Released: 8 October 2001
- Recorded: 1971–2001
- Genre: Pop rock, Funk, Soul, Disco
- Label: Warner Music Australia

Marcia Hines chronology
Queen of Pop (2000)	Diva (2001)	Hinesight (2004)

Diva is a compilation album by Australian singer-song writer Marcia Hines, released on 8 October 2001 through Warner Music Australia.

The album contains the track "Rise", an official song for the Australian team at the Sydney 2000 Olympic Games. The album shares the same name as Hines' fully authorised biography written by Karen Dewey and released in September 2001.

== Track listing ==
CD

1. "You" (3:14)
2. "Your Love Still Brings Me to My Knees" (3:31)
3. "Time Of Our Lives" (3:59)
4. "(I've Got To) Believe" (3:39)
5. "Fire & Rain" (5:06)
6. "What I Did for Love" (3:11)
7. "I Just Don't Know What to Do With Myself" (3:09)
8. "From the Inside" (3:36)
9. "Shining" (3:44)
10. "Something's Missing (In My Life)" (4:40)
11. "I've Got the Music in Me" (Mark Picchiotti mix) (4:39)
12. "Music Is My Life" (2:10)
13. "Taking it All in Stride" (4:27)
14. "I Don't Know How to Love Him" (3:49)
15. "Where Did We Go Wrong" (4:06)
16. "When You Cry" (5:54)
17. "What a Feeling" (M1:11 Remix) (3:26)
18. "Rise" (3:34) (Wiltshire/Monopoli/McLaughlin/Holden)
19. "Rain (Let the Children Play)" (4:35)
20. "A God That Can Dance" (3:09)

== Weekly charts ==
Chart (2001)	Peak position
ARIA Albums Chart	75
ARIA Australian Albums Chart	17

== Release history ==
Region	Date	Format	Label	Catalogue
Australia	8 October 2001	CD	Warner Music Australia	0927410822
