= Greatest Hits (Marcia Hines album) =

Greatest hits album by Marcia Hines
- Released: December 1981
- Recorded: 1975–1979
- Genre: Pop rock; funk; soul; disco
- Label: Wizard Records

Marcia Hines chronology
Take It from the Boys (1981)	Greatest Hits (1981)	Greatest Hits Volume 2 (1982)

Greatest Hits is the first greatest hits album by Australian recording artist, Marcia Hines. It was released in December 1981 and peaked at number 2 on the Australian Kent Music Report in January 1982. This remains Hines’ highest charting album. The chart position of Greatest Hits gave Hines the distinction of being the first Australian female performer to release seven consecutive Top 20 Albums. The back of the LP also said the Hines had sold over 600,000 copies of her first five albums and had accrued 11 platinum awards in Australia alone.

== Track listing ==
Side A

1. “From the Inside” (new version)(3:56)
2. “Shining” (3:42)
3. “Something's Missing (In My Life)” (4:36)
4. “What I Did For Love” (3:15)
5. “I Just Don't Know What To Do With Myself” (3:06)
6. “Where Did We Go Wrong” (4:03)
7. “Fire and Rain” (4:44)
8. “I Don't Know How To Love Him” (3:46)

Side B

1. “You” (3:15)
2. “Don't Let The Grass Grow” (2:58)
3. “Jumpin' Jack Flash” (new version)(3:13)
4. “Whatever Goes Around” (2:57)
5. “Trilogy” (4:19)
6. “Moments” (3:22)
7. “Music Is My Life” (2:07)
8. “Believe In Me” (2:07)
9. “Empty” (2:34)
10. “I've Got the Music in Me” (4:12)

== Charts ==
Chart (1982)	Peak position
Australian (Kent Music Report)	2

== Certifications and sales ==
Region	Certification	Certified units/sales
Australia (ARIA)	Platinum	50,000^{^}
^{^} Shipments figures based on certification alone.
