= Marcia Hines Live Across Australia =

Live album by Marcia Hines
- Released: February 1978
- Recorded: 1976–1978
- Genre: Disco, pop
- Label: Miracle Records
- Producer: Robie Porter

Marcia Hines chronology
Ladies and Gentlemen (1977)	Marcia Hines Live Across Australia (1978)	Ooh Child (1979)

Singles from Marcia Hines Live Across Australia
- 1. "Music Is My Life" Released: February 1978; 2. "Imagination" Released: May 1978

Marcia Hines Live Across Australia is the first live album (fourth album in total) from Australian recording artist, Marcia Hines. It peaked at No. 7, becoming Hines' fourth consecutive top ten album. It sold over 50,000 in five days and sold over 100,000 copies in total.

The album was released digitally in November 2016.

== Background ==
Hines had toured solidly through 1976–77, cementing her recording success with sell-out shows around the country. The band that consisted of Stephen Housden (guitar), Frank Esler-Smith (keyboards), Tony Hedges (keyboards), Warren Ford (keyboards), Mike Cleary (trumpet), Mike Bukovsky (trumpet), Richard Gawned (tenor sax, flute), Steve Parkinson (baritone sax, flute), Monalisa and Terry Young (backing vocals), Jackie Orszaczky (musical director, bass) and Mark Kennedy (drums)

== Track listing ==
Side A

1. "I Just Don't Know What to Do with Myself" (Hal David, Burt Bacharach) - 3:26
2. "Once We Get Started" (Gavin Christopher) - 3:52
3. "You" (Tom Snow) - 3:%2
4. "Maybe It's Time To Start Calling It Love" (Gary Harju, James David, Steve Dorff) - 2:57
5. "Imagination" (Bob Margolin) - 4:01
6. "Shining" (Jill Wagner, Robie Porter) - 4:14

Side B

1. "I Don't Know How to Love Him" (Andrew Lloyd Webber, Tim Rice) - 6:33
2. "Whatever Goes Around" (Al Sharp) - 3:04
3. "Love Is Blue" (André Popp, Bryan Blackburn, Pierre Cour) - 3:50
4. "Do You Know What It Means" (Eddie DeLange, Louis Alter) - 3:51
5. "Fire and Rain" (James Taylor) - 6:19

Side C

1. "Trilogy" (Porter) - 5:53
2. "More Than You'll Ever Know" (Al Kooper) - 8:16
3. "Empty" (Porter) - 2:53
4. "Jumpin' Jack Flash" (Mick Jagger, Keith Richards) - 8:16
5. "What I Did for Love" (Ed Kleban, Marvin Hamlisch) - 3:26

Side D

1. "Believe in Me" (Rick Springfield) - 2:52
2. "I've Got the Music in Me" (Bias Boshell)
3. "From the Inside"
4. "Music Is My Life" (studio recording) (Porter, Wagner, Hines) - 2:07

== Charts ==
=== Weekly charts ===
Chart (1978)	Peak position
Australian (Kent Music Report)	7

=== Year-end charts ===
The album was the 4th highest-selling album by an Australian artist in 1978.

Chart (1978)	Position
Australian (Kent Music Report)	34
