= Amazing (Marcia Hines album) =

Studio album by Marcia Hines
- Released: 4 April 2014
- Recorded: 2013–2014
- Genres: Rock; pop
- Length: 56:07
- Label: Ambition Entertainment
- Producer: Tom Diesel

Marcia Hines chronology
Marcia Sings Tapestry (2010)	Amazing (2014)	Still Shining: The 50th Anniversary Ultimate Collection (2023)

Singles from Amazing
- 1. "Amazing" Released: 21 February 2014; 2. "Remedy" Released: 6 July 2014; 3. "Heartache" Released: 14 November 2014

Amazing is the fourteenth studio album released by Australian musician Marcia Hines, released in April 2014. The album featured a duet with Russell Crowe. It debuted and peaked at number 27 on the ARIA Albums Chart.

It is her first album of original songs in two decades, with Hines crediting a chance meeting with Joni Mitchell in Los Angeles for this: "She played me her playlist of all the songs she would really dig if she was stranded on a desert island and told me I had to get mine together. I told her my ideas about what I wanted to do next and she told me to follow them."

Hines returned to the R&B sound that saw her reach No. 2 on the Australian charts in 1977 with her single "You".

A deluxe version of the album was released in April 2018, featuring six of Hines' biggest hits.

== Promotion ==
Hines did an in store appearance on 19 April at the WOW Music store in Sydney

Four promotional video clips were released; "Amazing", "Remedy", "Let Love Flow" and "Chase the Feeling".

== Critical reception ==
The Daily Telegraph wrote that on the album Hines "brings sexy back", while The Canberra Times called it "an uncompromising album, full of deep, heartfelt moments, where her royal Hines-ness shows a very intimate and tender side".

== Track listing ==
Adapted from AllMusic.

All tracks are written by Tom Diesel, Marcia Hines and Ron E. Jones.

No.	Title	Length
1.	"Amazing"	3:36
2.	"Line in the Sand"	3:32
3.	"Coldest Winter Nights"	4:14
4.	"Chase That Feeling"	3:42
5.	"Remedy" (with Russell Crowe)	3:29
6.	"Hung Up"	3:45
7.	"Rain"	4:35
8.	"Equals Three" (featuring Diesel))	4:27
9.	"Heartache"	4:05
10.	"Silent Tears"	3:55
11.	"Holla"	3:41
12.	"The Change"	4:36
13.	"Let Love Flow"	3:40
14.	"Imagine"	4:50
Total length:		56:07

Deluxe edition
No.	Title	Writer(s)	Length
15.	"You"	Tom Snow
16.	"I Just Don't Know What to Do with Myself"	Burt Bacharach, Hal David
17.	"I've Got the Music in Me"	Bias Boshell
18.	"Shining"	Jill Wagner, Robie Porter
19.	"Something's Missing (In My Life)"	Paul Jabara, Jay Asher
20.	"Fire and Rain"	James Taylor

== Charts ==
Chart (2014)	Peak position
Australian Albums (ARIA)	27

== Tour ==
Hines supported the album with a national tour.

Date	Location	Venue
31 July 2014	Bangalow	The Bowlo
1 August 2014	Tweed Heads	Twin Towns
2 August 2014	Brisbane	Redlands Performing Arts Centre
3 August 2014	Brisbane	Kedron-Wavell Services Club
15 August 2014	Ettalong Beach	Ettalong Diggers
16 August 2014	Hurlstone Park	Canterbury Hurlstone Park RSL
18 September 2014	Sydney	Slide Lounge
19 September 2014	Sydney	Slide Lounge
21 August 2014	Frankston	Frankston Arts Centre
22 August 2014	Melbourne	The Palms at Crown
23 August 2014	Albury	SS&A Club
24 August 2014	Bendigo	The Capital
26 August 2014	Warragul	West Gippsland Performing Arts Centre
28 August 2014	Bunbury	Entertainment Centre
29 August 2014	Perth	Astor Theatre
31 August 2014	Adelaide	Dunstan Playhouse Theatre
5 September 2014	Launceston	Country Club Casino
6 September 2014	Hobart	Wrest Point Hotel Casino

== Release history ==
Region	Date	Format	Edition(s)	Label	Catalogue
Australia	4 April 2014	CD; digital download	Standard	FanFare/ Ambition Entertainment	FANFARE144
Australia	6 April 2018	CD; digital download	Deluxe	FanFare/ Ambition Entertainment	FANFARE299
