= Greatest Hits Volume 2 (Marcia Hines album) =

Greatest hits album by Marcia Hines
- Released: 1982
- Recorded: 1975–1979
- Genre: Pop rock; funk; soul; disco
- Length: 55.34
- Label: Wizard Records

Marcia Hines chronology
Greatest hits (1981)	Greatest Hits Volume 2 (1982)	Jokers and Queens (1982)

Greatest Hits Volume 2 is the second greatest hits album by Australian recording artist, Marcia Hines. It was released in early 1982, following the success of Greatest Hits, which was released in December 1981 and peaked at number 2 on the Australian Kent Music Report in January 1982. This remains Hines’ highest charting album.

== Track listing ==
Side A

1. "Signed, Sealed, Delivered" (3:30)
2. "Love Is the Key" (2:30)
3. "April Sun in Cuba" (3:45)
4. "Save the Last Dance for Me" (2:39)
5. "(Until) Your Love Broke Through" (3:19)
6. "A Love Story" (3:35)
7. "In a Mellow Mood" (2:40)
8. "Maybe It's Time" (3:20)
9. "Love Is a Hurtin' Thing" (2:56)

Side B

1. "Try it With Me" (2:46)
2. "You Gotta Let Go" (3:30)
3. "But it's Alright" (2:35)
4. "Let the Music Play" (4:26)
5. "Dance You Fool Dance" (5:16)
6. "Imagination" (3:49)
7. "Once We Get Started" (4:55)
