= Jackie Orszaczky =

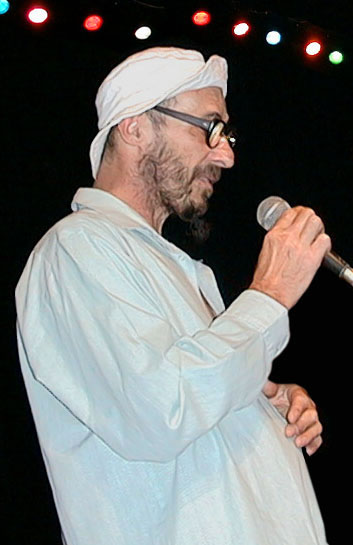
- Orszaczky speaking at the Pataky Cultural Centre, Budapest, Hungary in June 2003

Background information
- Born: Miklós József Orszáczky; 8 May 1948; Józsefváros, Budapest, Hungary
- Died: 3 February 2008 (aged 59) Sydney, New South Wales, Australia
- Genres: Jazz, blues, R&B, funk, progressive rock
- Occupations: Musician, producer
- Instruments: Bass guitar, piano, vocals
- Years active: 1965–2008
- Labels: Spin, Festival, Real, Electric, ABC, Wright, Shock, Wizard

Miklós József "Jackie" Orszáczky (8 May 1948 – 3 February 2008) was a Hungarian-Australian musician, arranger, vocalist and record producer. His musical styles included jazz, blues, R&B, funk and progressive rock; he mainly played bass guitar – from the early 1990s he used a modified piccolo bass – but also various other instruments. In 2006 Orszaczky was awarded the Knight's Cross of the Order of Merit by the Hungarian government. Also that year Orszaczky was diagnosed with Hodgkin's lymphoma and died on 3 February 2008, aged 59.

== Early life ==
Orszaczky was born as Miklós József Orszáczky on 8 May 1948 in Budapest, Hungary. His father, László Orszáczky, was an engineer, his mother was Giselle, and his brother was László Orszáczky. His family lived in District VIII: Józsefváros (English: Josephtown) where, from the age of five, he studied classical piano and violin. Orszaczky preferred listening to his father's Spanish and Afro-Cuban records and the local gypsy music. During the Hungarian Revolution of 1956 the Orszaczky family hid in their cellar for a week and emerged to see their home with bullet ridden walls and the local streets with dead bodies of people run over by tanks. Orszaczky was a member of his school's 60-piece orchestra.

== Career ==
=== Hungarian groups: Új Rákfogó to Syrius ===
In 1965 Jackie Orszaczky started a rock band, Új Rákfogó (English: New Crab-catcher), while attending Dugonics Utcai Általános Iskola (English: Dugonics Street Elementary School) in Josephtown. Other members were Miklos Cserba on guitar, Laszlo Mogyorossy on guitar, Lakatos Bogoly Bela (aka "Horse-fly Locksmith") on drums. Later additions included his brother, László Orszáczky, on keyboards (1966–67), Mezei Aniko on vocals and Vadasz "Ferike" on guitar. They performed in local clubs until dawn – Orszaczky would sleep in and missed so much school he was expelled due to low attendance. In 1969 Orszaczky joined jazz-fusion and progressive rock group, Syrius on bass guitar, guitar and vocals. Other members of Syrius were Zoltan "Joel" Baronits on piano, oboe and saxophone; Latsi "Les" Pataki on organ, piano and drums; Mihaly "Michie" Raduly on saxophone, flute and violin; and Andras "Andrew" Veszelinov on drums, guitar and trombone. Australian backpacker, Charles Fisher, saw one of the group's gigs and advised them to tour Australia. Syrius toured there in 1970–71, including a performance at the Myponga Festival in South Australia in January 1971. In Melbourne they recorded an album, Syrius, with Fisher producing, which was released both in Australia (on the Spin label) and Hungary. In Australia they also issued a single, "I've Been This Down Before". According to Australian rock music historian, Ian McFarlane, Syrius were "Hungary's top rock attraction, and had already issued several albums of jazz fusion before relocating to Australia". In October 1971, after the tour, the group returned to Hungary.

=== Australian artists: from Bakery to solo ===
By August 1973 Jackie Orszaczky had returned to Australia and joined Bakery, an experimental progressive rock group which had already released two albums – he remained until the band broke up in February 1975. Soon after he used a studio band of Peter Jones on electric piano, Graham Morgan on drums and John Robinson on guitar (ex-Blackfeather), to record his debut solo album, Beramiada. In May 1975 he joined Marcia Hines' backing band on bass guitar and also became her musical director and arranger. In December that year, Beramiada was issued on the Real label and "featured accomplished progressive jazz-fusion in the vein of Weather Report, George Duke and Caravanserai-era Santana". In December 1976 he released a solo single, "Let's Go and Make It". He worked for Hines for four years and appeared on her debut album, Marcia Shines (October 1975) and its related singles including, "Fire and Rain" (May 1975), "From the Inside" and "I Just Don't Know What to Do with Myself". Orszackzy created the stage arrangements for Hines' Australian tour, which was recorded for her double-live album, Marcia Hines Live Across Australia, and was released by March 1978.

In 1987 Orszaczky formed Jump Back Jack with Linda Bacon on trumpet and vocals; Mike Bukowsky on trumpet; Mark Simmons on saxophone; James Greening on trombone; Phillip Campbell on drums (ex-Electric Pandas); Phil Colson on guitar and vocals; and Hamish Stewart on drums (Ayers Rock). They performed "West Coast rock and funk in the vein of Cold Blood, Tower of Power and Blood, Sweat & Tears". The group released Jump Back Jack (1987) and Double Take (1988). In 1990 he founded The Godmothers with Chris Abrahams on keyboards and Greg Sheehan on drums; (Blackfeather, MacKenzie Theory, Richard Clapton Band). This group played cover versions of R&B and funk, including Ray Charles' songs. In August 1994 Orszaczky released his second solo album, Family Lore, backed by The Grandmasters which had a line-up of Abrahams with Arne Hanna on guitar (Whirlywirld, Max Q), Cathy Harley on piano, Tina Harrod on vocals, and Geoff Lundgren on synthesiser. Within six months of meeting, Orszaczky and Harrod (born 1964, New Zealand) had become a domestic couple.

He established a career as a leading musician in the front rank of much of the best jazz, soul, funk and rhythm & blues music created in Australia in the 1970s to the 2000s. He also continued to tour in Hungary, and continued to command crowds of 3,000 to 30,000 people at his annual Budapest concerts. Orszaczky performed with various groups: The Grandmasters, with Harrod; Jump Back Jack; the Godmothers; The Orszaczky Budget Orchestra; and, the Jackie Orszaczky Band. He wrote arrangements and orchestrations for The Whitlams, You Am I, Hoodoo Gurus, Tim Finn, Savage Garden, Hoodoo Gurus, Grinspoon and Leonardo's Bride. He also collaborated with Tony Buck, Chris Abrahams, Andrew Robson. In 2006 Orszaczky was awarded the Knight's Cross of the Order of Merit by the Hungarian government.

== Piccolo bass ==
In the early 1990s, Orszaczky developed his version of the piccolo bass, a high-tuned bass guitar with light gauge bass strings pitched either at D, G, C, F or E, A, D, G. This instrument became his signature in the later years.

== Personal life ==
Orszaczky was married twice; first to Leah Bangma (until 1984) they had a daughter, Anna (born February 1980); and his second marriage was to Tina Harrod, they also had a daughter, Mia (April 2000). Orszaczky and Harrod also collaborated musically as singer-songwriters; he co-produced her solo album, Shacked up in Paradise (February 2004).

In 2006 Orszaczky was diagnosed with leukaemia and, on 24 January 2008, he performed his last gig at the Macquarie Hotel in Surry Hills. Long-term supporting musician, Greening, described the evening as "unbelievable. 'Since his illness he continued to sing better and better every time I played with him ... It was inspiring and really empowering'". Jackie Orszaczky died on 3 February 2008 "in Royal Prince Alfred Hospital ... from complications in his treatment for lymphoma", aged 59.

== Selective discography ==
- 1971 - Devil's Masquerade, Syrius
- 1975 - Beramiada, Jackie Orszaczky
- 1986 - Industrial Accident, Jackie Orszaczky
- 1988 - Blue Cover, Jump Back Jack
- 1988 - 2JJ Double Take, Jump Back Jack
- 1994 - Most, Múlt, Lesz, Syrius
- 1994 - Family Lore, Jackie Orszaczky and The Grandmasters
- 1994 - 100%, Jackie Orszaczky
- 1997 - Deep, Down & Out, Orszaczky Budget Orchestra
- 2001 - Deserted Downtown, Tibor Tátrai and Jackie Orszaczky
- 2001 - The Last Concert, Syrius
- 2004 - Shacked Up in Paradise, Tina Harrod (produced by Jackie Orszaczky)
- 2008 - Ready To Listen, Jackie Orszaczky
