= Life (Marcia Hines album) =

Studio album by Marcia Hines
- Released: 17 November 2007
- Recorded: 2007
- Genre: Pop, Electronic, Funk, Soul
- Length: 61:08
- Label: Warner Music Australia
- Producer: Paul Wiltshire

Marcia Hines chronology
The Essential Marcia Hines (2007)	Life (2007)	Marcia Sings Tapestry (2010)

Singles from Life
- 1. "Get Here" Released: November 2007

Life is the twelfth studio album by Australian singer Marcia Hines, released in Australia on 17 November 2007 (see 2007 in music). It peaked at #21 in Australia.

The album is Hines' interpretation of songs originally recorded by artists such as John Lennon, R.E.M and Toni Braxton.

== Background ==
Following the success of her 2006 album, Discothèque, Hines was inducted into the ARIA Hall of Fame. Hines said of the achievement: "I love Australia, but most importantly I'm so happy that I am an Australian." Hines recorded a new album, titled, "Life". Songs that have she claims have 'helped her survive, and given her strength'.

Hines continued saying; "Everyone's life is remarkable. This album is about the heroism of everyday life. I am still a work in progress, but the life that I dreamed of is each day becoming a reality"

== Track listing ==
CD

No.	Title	Writer(s)	Length
1.	"Listen"	Marcia Hines, Paul Wiltshire, Victoria Wu	1:24
2.	"Everybody Hurts"	Bill Berry, Peter Buck, Mike Mills, Michael Stipe	5:19
3.	"All Woman"	Lisa Stansfield, Ian Devaney, Andy Morris	5:01
4.	"Imagine"	John Lennon	4:41
5.	"Get Here"	Brenda Russell	3:54
6.	"Breathe Again"	Kenneth "Babyface" Edmonds	4:31
7.	"God Bless the Child"	Billie Holiday, Arthur Herzog, Jr.	4:03
8.	"I'll Stand by You"	Chrissie Hynde Tom Kelly, Billy Steinberg	3:24
9.	"(You Make Me Feel Like) A Natural Woman"	Gerry Goffin, Carole King, Jerry Wexler	2:51
10.	"She's Leaving Home"	Lennon–McCartney	3:44
11.	"The Living Years"	Mike Rutherford, B. A. Robertson	5:52
12.	"No Ordinary Love"	Sade, Stuart Matthewman	5:07
13.	"A House Is Not a Home"	Burt Bacharach, Hal David	6:59
14.	"I Am"	Marcia Hines, Paul Wiltshire, Victoria Wu	4:07

- A limited edition includes a DVD documentary on the making of Life.

== Charts ==
Chart (2007)	Peak position
Australian Albums (ARIA)	21

== Credits ==
- Arranged & mixed & produced by – Paul L. Wiltshire
- Executive-Producer – Peter Rix, Warren Costello
- Additional Production – Andrew Glozer, Brad Evans, Phil Turcio, Victoria Wu
- Backing vocals – Jud Field, Natalie Dunn
- Bass – Luke Hodgson, Paul Bushnell
- Choir – The Melbourne Gospel Choir
- Drums – Brian McCloud, Gavin Ford, Tim O'Connor
- Guitar – Grecco Buratto, Paul Wiltshire
- Piano, Keyboards – Brad Evans, Jim Cox, Paul Wiltshire, Phil Turcio
- Saxophone, Flute – Lachlan Davidson
- Strings – Caleb Wright, Christina Katsimbardis, Edwina Hookey, Helen Ayres, Helen Ireland, Jonathan Wong, Kate Sullivan, Katherine Lukey, Kathryn Taylor, Kylie Liang, Lucas O'Brian, Michael Brooks Reid, Michael Dahlenburg, Paul Zabrowarny, Rachel Homburg, Steve Newton, Suying Aw, Svetlana Bogosavljevic
- Trombone – Ian Bell
- Trumpet – Greg Spence, Shane Gillard
