= Ooh Child =

Ooh Child may refer to:

- "O-o-h Child", a 1970 single by the Five Stairsteps
- Ooh Child (album), a 1979 album by Marcia Hines
