= Love Is a Hurtin' Thing =

"Love Is A Hurtin' Thing"

Single by Lou Rawls

from the album Soulin'
- B-side: "Memory Lane"
- Released: October 1966
- Recorded: 1966
- Studio: Capitol Studios, Hollywood, California
- Genre: R&B
- Length: 2:12
- Label: Capitol
- Songwriters: Ben Raleigh, Dave Linden (pseudonym used by David J. Luff)
- Producer: David Axelrod

Lou Rawls singles chronology
"The Shadow of Your Smile" (1966)	"Love Is A Hurtin' Thing" (1966)	"You Can Bring Me All Your Heartaches" (1966)

"Love Is a Hurtin' Thing" is a 1966 pop/soul single by Lou Rawls and was written by Ben Raleigh (1913-1997) & Dave Linden (pseudonym used by David J. Luff). The single was his second entry on the R&B singles chart as well as his first Top 40 hit on the Billboard Hot 100 pop chart. "Love Is a Hurtin' Thing" was the first of two Lou Rawls singles to make it to number one on the R&B chart.

== Chart positions ==
Chart (1966)	Peak position
U.S. Billboard Hot 100	13
U.S. Billboard Hot R&B Singles	1

== Cover versions ==
- Big Maybelle covered the song in 1967, included on her album Got A Brand New Bag.
- J.J. Jackson covered the song in 1967, included on his But It's Alright album.
- Buddy Greco recorded a version that lasted for nearly six and a half minutes. It was on his Let the Sunshine In album which was released in 1969.
- Gloria Ann Taylor recorded a version of the song for a 1972 7-inch single, which was later expanded in a seven-minute long 12-inch remix.
- Marcia Hines covered the song in 1977, included on her Ladies and Gentlemen album.
