= Velvet (musical) =

2015 musical

Velvet is an Australian musical partly based on New York's Studio 54. It debuted at the Adelaide Fringe Festival in 2015. It features a mix of music and acrobatics.

The musical was directed by Craig Ilott and was based on a concept created by Marcia Hines, Peter Rix and Craig Ilott.

The show has been performed in Edinburgh, Brisbane, Sydney, Melbourne, Adelaide Perth, Hobart and New Zealand. Featured cast has included Marcia Hines and Brendan Maclean and Mirko Köckenberger.

== Soundtrack ==
Velvet The Original Cast Recording

Soundtrack album by Various artists
- Released: 2015
- Label: Social Family Records
- Producers: Nick Pringadi, Joe Accaria

An Original Cast Recording album was released in 2015.

At the 2016 ARIA Music Awards, it was nominated for Best Original Soundtrack, Cast or Show Album.

== Track listing ==
No.	Title	Writer(s)	Length
1.	"Boogie Wonderland" (performed by Marcia Hines)	Allee Willis; (Jon Lind
2.	"Le Freak (Dimitri from Paris remix)"	Bernard Edwards; Nile Rodgers
3.	"If You Could Read My Mind" (performed by Brendan Maclean)	Gordon Lightfoot
4.	"Young Hearts Run Free (J. Morales remix)"	David Crawford]
5.	"Everybody Dance"	Bernard Edwards; Nile Rodgers
6.	"Shake Your Groove Thing"	Dino Fekaris; Freddie Perren
7.	"Never Knew Love Like This Before" (performed by Marcia Hines)	James Mtume; Reggie Lucas
8.	"It's Raining Men" (performed by Marcia Hines)	Paul Jabara; Paul Shaffer
9.	"You Medley ("Thinking of You" / "You to Me Are Everything" / "You)" (performed by Brendan Maclean and Marcia Hines)	Wayne Vaughn; Wanda Vaughn; Maurice White; Ken Gold; Michael Denne; Tom Snow
10.	"Turn The Beat Around" (performed by Chaska Halliday and Rechelle Mansour)	Gerald Jackson; Pete Jackson
11.	"I Feel Love"	Giorgio Moroder; Pete Bellotte; Donna Summer
12.	"No More Tears (Enough Is Enough)" (performed by Brendan Maclean and Marcia Hines)	Bruce Roberts; Paul Jabara
13.	"He's the Greatest Dancer" (performed by Chaska Halliday and Rechelle Mansour)	Bernard Edwards; Nile Rodgers
14.	"Stayin' Alive" (performed by Joe Accaria)	Barry Gibb; Maurice Gibb; Robin Gibb
15.	"Last Dance" (performed by Marcia Hines)	Paul Jabba; Giorgio Moroder; Bob Esty
