= Hinesight =

Studio album by Marcia Hines
- Released: September 6, 2004
- Genre: Pop, soul, jazz
- Length: 50:38
- Label: BMG
- Producer: John Foreman

Marcia Hines chronology
Diva (2001)	Hinesight (2004)	Marcia: Greatest Hits 1975–1983 (2004)

Singles from Hinesight
- 1. "Ain't Nobody (promo)"

Hinesight (Songs from the Journey) is a studio album released by Australian recording artist Marcia Hines. It was released in September 2004 through BMG Australia and includes a duet with Belinda Emmett. It peaked at No. 12 on the Australian albums chart.

== Background ==
In 2003, Hines joined the panel as a judge on the inaugural season of Australian Idol. This gained new notoriety and interest in her music. Hines signed a contract to release an album through BMG Australia (the same label as the winners of Australian Idol) and she recorded a diverse collection of covers. The album was produced by Idol musical director, John Foreman.

Hines performed the first and only single "Ain't Nobody" live on the Australian Idol finale on the 21 November 2004.

== Track listing ==
CD

#	Title	Original performer	Writer	Duration
1	"Ain't Nobody"	Rufus & Chaka Khan	David "Hawk" Wolinski	3:43
2	"Fine Brown Frame"	The Thad Jones/Mel Lewis Orchestra	Guadalupe Cartiero, J. Mayo Williams	3:00
3	"Take Me in Your Arms"	Kim Weston	Holland–Dozier–Holland	3:03
4	"Shower the People" (featuring Belinda Emmett)	James Taylor	James Taylor	4:18
5	"When I Fall in Love"	Jeri Southern	Edward Heyman, Victor Young	3:05
6	"I.G.Y. (What a Beautiful World)"	Donald Fagen	Donald Fagen	3:59
7	"You Are Everything"	The Stylistics	Linda Creed, Thom Bell	2:48
8	"Sunshine" (featuring Ian Moss)	Dragon	Paul Hewson	4:45
9	"You Send Me"	Sam Cooke	Sam Cooke	2:51
10	"How Deep Is Your Love"	Bee Gees	Bee Gees	4:26
11	"Ooh Boy"	Rose Royce	Norman Whitfield	3:59
12	"Something So Right"	Annie Lennox	Paul Simon	4:58
13	"Forever Young"	Bob Dylan	Bob Dylan	4:57

== Charts ==
Chart (2004)	Peak position
Australian Albums (ARIA)	12
