= Time of Our Lives (album) =

Studio album by Marcia Hines
- Released: July 28, 1999
- Recorded: 1998–1999
- Genre: Dance-pop, R&B, pop rock
- Length: 56:40
- Label: Warner Music Australia
- Producer: Rockmelons

Marcia Hines chronology
Right Here and Now (1994)	Time of Our Lives (1999)	Queen of Pop (2000)

Singles from Time of Our Lives
- 1. "What a Feeling" Released: November 1998; 2. "Makin' My Way" Released: February 1999; 3. "Time of Our Lives" Released: May 1999; 4. "Woo Me" Released: 1999

Time of Our Lives is the ninth studio album by Australian pop singer Marcia Hines, released in 1999 by Warner Music Australia; it peaked at #17.

It was nominated for 'Best Adult Contemporary Album' at the ARIA Music Awards of 2000,

== Album information ==
In 1998, Marcia met with The Rockmelons' Bryon Jones and Ray Medhurst, who oversaw the album's production and assisted Hines in selecting songs and producers for each track. The album was recorded between the UK and the USA and took two years.

Hines promoted the album in February 1999 by performing at the Sydney Gay and Lesbian Mardi Gras, opening the Sydney Olympic Stadium in front of 100,000 people. She then embarked on a tour throughout the latter part of 1999.

== Review ==
The Australian Jazz Agency said:

It's vintage Marcia[,] but it's also completely fresh and up to date. From the groovy reggae[-]based "Woo Me," penned by the Rockies as a nod to Marcia's West Indian heritage to slam[-]dunk dance tracks "Which Way is Up" and an updated version of a Marcia standard "I Got the Music in Me" produced in Chicago by hot dance re-mixer Mark Picciotti (sic). Then there are the big ballads, two of which are penned by the best in the business, Diane Warren (think Cher, Celine Dion, Bon Jovi). Marcia tears at the heartstrings and rips them to shreds on these Warren originals, "When You Cry" and "Making My Way." A highlight of the album is undoubtedly a haunting version of the theme from Valley of the Dolls, which Dionne Warwick first recorded.

"It was a song I wanted to sing, but it's a hard song to sing," says Marcia. "The day I came home from recording, it I thought I could die now I was so happy with the vocal."

== Singles ==
The first single was a cover of Irene Cara's hit "What a Feeling" and peaked at #66 in Australia and #23 in New Zealand. The second single, "Makin' My Way," peaked at #71 in Australia. The third single was the title track "Time of our Lives", a cover of a 1994 song by Alison Limerick, which peaked at #31 in June 1999. This was the highest-charting single from the album.

== Track listing ==
CD

No.	Title	Writer(s)	Length
1.	"Time of Our Lives"	Charlie Mole, Gerry DeVeaux	3:56
2.	"Woo Me"	Barbara Griffin, Bryon Jones, Jonathon Jones, Raymond Medhurst	3:59
3.	"Love After Love"	Dane Deviller, Jack Kugell, Sean Hosein	4:13
4.	"When You Cry"	Diane Warren	5:54
5.	"Mesmerise"	The Rockmelons	4:11
6.	"Which Way Is Up"	Norman Whitfield	4:18
7.	"I Will Hear You"	Annie Roboff, Franne Golde, Toni C.	4:30
8.	"Valley of the Dolls"	André Previn, Dorothy Langan-Previn	3:43
9.	"Makin' My Way"	Diane Warren	3:48
10.	"I Got the Music in Me"	Bias Boshell	4:38
11.	"What a Feeling"	Giorgio Moroder, Irene Cara, Keith Forsey	5:28
12.	"Time of Our Lives" (remix) (hidden track)	Charlie Mole, Gerry DeVeaux	8:02

== Charts ==
"Time of our Lives" debuted and peaked at #17 in Australia.

Chart (1999)	Peak position
Australian Albums Chart	17
