= Marcia Sings Tapestry =

Studio album by Marcia Hines
- Released: 1 October 2010
- Recorded: Megaphon Studios, Electric Avenue Studios
- Genre: Rock; pop
- Length: 54:16
- Label: Verve
- Producer: Dave Symes

Marcia Hines chronology
| Life (2007) | Marcia Sings Tapestry (2010) | Amazing (2014) |

Marcia Sings Tapestry is a studio album released by Australian musician Marcia Hines, released physically and digitally in October 2010. It debuted at No. 16 in Australia, which is Hines' 11th top 20 album there.

Marcia Sings Tapestry is a tribute album to Carole King's 1971 album, Tapestry. The songs appear in the same order on both albums, with tracks 13–15 'bonus' for this album.

Hines said of the release: "Carole King's Tapestry is an album that has been very integral in my life," explains Marcia. "I love singing and these songs allow me to sing." Hines continued saying, "it was recorded in 1970 so the technology since then really has changed... I really believe if it ain't broke don't fix it so I sang the songs with the same respect as though they were written for me or I wrote them myself. But if you put my voice to anything and somebody else's voice to the same thing, no two people are going to interpret that song the same way. The great thing about being a singer is that you actually are a storyteller."

== Track listing ==
All songs written by Carole King except where noted.

1. "I Feel the Earth Move" – 3:29
2. "So Far Away" – 3:38
3. "It's Too Late" (lyrics by Toni Stern) – 3:29
4. "Home Again" – 2:19
5. "Beautiful" – 2:34
6. "Way Over Yonder" – 4:42
7. "You've Got a Friend" – 5:00
8. "Where You Lead" (lyrics by Toni Stern) – 3:26
9. "Will You Love Me Tomorrow?" (Gerry Goffin, King) – 3:43
10. "Smackwater Jack" (Goffin, King) – 3:58
11. "Tapestry" – 4:14
12. "(You Make Me Feel Like) A Natural Woman" (Goffin, King, Jerry Wexler) – 3:58
13. "Up on the Roof" (King, Goffin) – 3:43
14. "Oh No, Not My Baby" (King, Goffin) – 3:10
15. "Chains" (King, Goffin) – 2:55
16. "So Far Away" (acoustic version) [iTunes only] – 3:47

== Charts ==
| Chart (2010) | Peak position |
|---|---|
| Australian Albums (ARIA) | 16 |
