= Right Here and Now (Marcia Hines album) =

Studio album by Marcia Hines
- Released: 15 October 1994
- Recorded: Studios 301, Eclipse Studios, Sydney.
- Genre: jazz; funk; pop
- Label: Warner Music Australasia
- Producer: Daniel Denholm, Robin Smith

Marcia Hines chronology
Complete Marcia Hines 1975–1984 (1985)	Right Here and Now (1994)	Time of Our Lives (1999)

Singles from Amazing
- 1. "Rain (Let the Children Play)" Released: August 1994; 2. "Give it All You Got" Released: November 1994

Right Here and Now is the eighth studio album released by Australian musician Marcia Hines, in October 1994. It debuted and peaked at #21 on the ARIA chart. It is her first album of original songs since Love Sides in 1983.

== Background ==
In March 1994, Hines toured nationally for the first time in seven years and she signed a new contract with Warner Music Australia.

== Track listing ==
No.	Title	Writer(s)	Length
1.	"Give It All You Got"	Robin Smith	3:55
2.	"Rain (Let the Children Play)"	Robin Smith	4:13
3.	"Change"	Brian Jones, Marcia Hines, Robin Smith	5:18
4.	"Point of No Return"	Robin Jones	4:41
5.	"Right Here & Now"	Robin Smith	5:26
6.	"Common Mind"	A Caine, Marcia Hines, Robin Smith	4:33
7.	"Ought to Know" (with John Kenny)	Robin Smith	4:32
8.	"Your Love (Still Brings Me to My Knees)"	Bobby Wood, Roger Cook	3:55
9.	"Don't Mean Nothin'"	Robin Smith	4:35
10.	"Nobody Knows"	Anthony Dale, Vince Deltito	4:30
11.	"Know It in Your Heart"	Robin Smith	5:08
12.	"Sooner or Later"	Brian Jones, Barry Blue, Robin Smith	4:34

== Charts ==
Right Here and Now debuted and peaked at number 21 in October 1994.

Chart (1994)	Peak position
ARIA Albums Chart	21
