= The Lord's Prayer (David Fanshawe song) =

Single by David Fanshawe and Marcia Hines
- A-side: "The Lord's Prayer"
- B-side: "Ring Out the Bells"
- Released: March 1988
- Genre: Folk music, World music, African music
- Length: 3:08
- Label: WEA
- Songwriter: David Fanshawe
- Producers: David Fanshawe, Michael McCarthy

Marcia Hines singles chronology
"Baby Blue" / "Lavender Mountain" (1983)	"The Lord's Prayer" (1988)	"Rain (Let the Children Play)" (1994)

"The Lord's Prayer" is a song written by David Fanshawe for his 1972 choral work African Sanctus.

The song was recorded featuring American-Australian singer Marcia Hines and released in March 1988.

At the ARIA Music Awards of 1989, Hines received a nomination for Best Female Artist, losing to Kate Ceberano's You've Always Got the Blues.

== Track listing ==
CD (WEA 7-258054)

1. "The Lord's Prayer" - 3:08
2. "Ring Out the Bells" - 5:00

Vinyl (WEA – 255539-1)

1. "The Lord's Prayer" - 3:08
2. "Cattles Songs From Kenya And Uganda" - 3:00
3. "African Lamentation" - 1:02
4. "The Lord's Prayer" (Choir Version) - 3:12
5. "Only a Star" - 1:52
6. "Holy Jesus" - 1:30
7. "Ring Out the Bells" - 5:00
8. "Spoken Introduction/Ring Out the Bells" - 8:02
9. "Ring Out the Bells" (Encore) - 3:26
