= The Gospel According to Marcia =

Studio album by Marcia Hines
- Released: 3 November 2023
- Length: 44:17
- Label: ABC Music

Marcia Hines chronology
Still Shining: The 50th Anniversary Ultimate Collection (2023)	The Gospel According to Marcia (2023)

Singles from The Gospel According to Marcia
- 1. "Lean on Me" Released: 25 August 2023; 2. "Loves Me Like a Rock" Released: 13 October 2023

The Gospel According to Marcia is the fifteenth studio album released by Australian musician Marcia Hines, released on 3 November 2023 through ABC Music. The album was announced in August 2023 alongside the release of the first single, a cover of Bill Withers's "Lean on Me".

The album will be supported by a TV special, airing on ABC TV on 24 December 2023.

== Background and release ==
In 2022, Hines performed several live shows titled The Gospel According to Marcia Hines alongside a rhythm section and a 12-member choir. In April 2022, during the promotion of the shows, Marcia told news.com.au of fond early memories growing up in the church saying, "I learned a lot of stuff just from sitting in church and listening. In the churches I grew up in, there's a rhythm section and a kick-ass choir. It's not a morbid thing; it's a joyous thing." These shows received positive reviews inspired Hines to record a gospel album.

Upon announcement of the album in August 2023, Hines said "This album represents a coming home for me. My childhood life in Boston accompanying my godmother, Flo, to church on Sunday mornings gave me joy and happiness. That same joy and happiness surrounds every song, old and new, that I've chosen for this album, and I am so proud to introduce it to you."

== Track listing ==
The Gospel According to Marcia track listing
No.	Title	Writer(s)	Length
1.	"Amazing Grace"	John Newton	2:38
2.	"Loves Me Like a Rock"	Paul Simon	4:40
3.	"Down by the Riverside"	Jason Yarde	3:39
4.	"How Great Thou Art"	Stuart Keene Hine	4:18
5.	"Morning Has Broken"	Eleanor Farjeon; Yusuf Islam	3:46
6.	"Oh, Happy Day"	Edwin R. Hawkins	4:26
7.	"Abide with Me"	Henry Francis Lyte; William Henry Monk	4:18
8.	"What a Friend We Have in Jesus"	Paul Baloche; Charles Crozat Converse; Joseph Medlicott Scriven	3:59
9.	"Take Me to the King"	Kirk Franklin	4:17
10.	"Lean on Me"	Bill Withers	3:49
11.	"I Don't Know How to Love Him"	Andrew Lloyd Webber; Tim Rice	4:27
Total length:			44:17

== Charts ==
The Gospel According to Marcia did not reach the ARIA top 50, but peaked at number 15 on the ARIA Australian Artist chart and at number 2 on the Australian Independent Label Albums chart.

Chart (2023)	Peak position
Australian Independent Label Albums (AIR)	2
Australian Artist Albums (ARIA)	15
