= Ladies and Gentlemen (Marcia Hines album) =

Studio album by Marcia Hines
- Released: August 1977
- Studio: Trafalgar Studios, Sydney, Australia
- Genre: Disco; pop
- Label: Miracle Records
- Producer: Robie Porter

Marcia Hines chronology
Shining (1976)	Ladies and Gentlemen (1977)	Marcia Hines Live Across Australia (1978)

Singles from Ladies and Gentlemen
- 1. "What I Did for Love" / "A Love Story" Released: June 1977; 2. "You" / "In a Mellow Mood" Released: October 1977

Ladies and Gentlemen is the third studio album by American-Australian singer Marcia Hines. Ladies and Gentlemen peaked at No. 6 in Australia and produced two top ten singles, including "You", which peaked at No. 2 and remains Hines' highest-charting single.

== Track listing ==
Side A
No.	Title	Writer(s)	Length
1.	"In a Mellow Mood"	Robie Porter
2.	"Just One Smile"	Randy Newman
3.	"What I Did for Love"	Ed Kleban, Marvin Hamlisch	3:15
4.	"Believe in Me"	Rick Springfield
5.	"More Than You'll Ever Know"	Al Kooper

Side B
No.	Title	Writer(s)	Length
1.	"Try It with Me"	Danny Pierson, Ingrid Lieberberg
2.	"Maybe It's Time"	Gary Harju, Steve Dorff
3.	"You"	Tom Snow	3:07
4.	"Walking in the Sun"	Jeff Barry
5.	"Love Is a Hurtin' Thing"	Ben Raleigh, David Linden

== Personnel ==
- Produced, arranged and conducted by Robie Porter
- Cover art by Barry Falkner
- Cover photography – Patrick Jones
- Backing vocal by Lorna Wright and Terry Young
- Arranged by Col Loughnan (tracks: A2, A5, B2, B4, B5), Peter Jones (tracks: A1), Rick Formosa (tracks: A3, B1, B3), Tony Ansell (tracks: A1, B1, B3)

== Charts ==
=== Weekly charts ===
Chart (1977)	Peak position
Australian (Kent Music Report)	6

=== Year-end charts ===
Chart (1977)	Position
Australian (Kent Music Report)	40
