= Shining (Marcia Hines album) =

Studio album by Marcia Hines
- Released: November 1976
- Recorded: Trafalgar Studios, Sydney, Australia
- Genre: Disco; pop
- Label: Miracle Records
- Producer: Robie Porter

Marcia Hines chronology
Marcia Shines (1975)	Shining (1976)	Ladies and Gentlemen (1977)

Singles from Shining
- 1. "I Just Don't Know What to Do with Myself" Released: August 1976; 2. "Shining" Released: 1976 (NZ only); 3. "(Until) Your Love Broke Through" / "Whatever Goes Around" Released: December 1976

Shining is the second studio album by Australian singer Marcia Hines. Hines had been resident in Australia since 1970. Shining peaked at No. 3, and remains Hines' highest charting studio album. It sold more than 150,000 copies.

== Track listing ==
Side A
No.	Title	Writer(s)	Length
1.	"Shining"	Jill Wagner, Robie Porter	3:46
2.	"Whatever Goes Around"	Al Sharp	2:56
3.	"(Until) Your Love Broke Through"	Keith Green, Randy Stonehill, Todd Fishkind	3:15
4.	"Empty"	Robie Porter	2:35
5.	"A Love Story"	Robie Porter	3:31
6.	"I've Got the Music in Me"	Bias Boshell	4:11

Side two
No.	Title	Writer(s)	Length
1.	"I Just Don't Know What to Do with Myself"	Burt Bacharach, Hal David	3:08
2.	"Signed, Sealed, Delivered I'm Yours"	Stevie Wonder, Lee Garrett, Syreeta Wright, Lula Mae Hardaway	3:29
3.	"Love Is the Key"	Rick Springfield	2:45
4.	"I Got Everything (I Need)"	Victor Thomas	3:13
5.	"Hallelujah"	Bruce Balinger	3:09

== Personnel ==
- Produced and arranged by Robie Porter
- Assistant producer – J. M. Wagner
- Arranged by Colin Loughnan (tracks: A3 to A6, B3 to B5), Graeme Lyall (tracks: A2, B1, B2) & Jimmie Haskell (tracks: A1)
- Recording Engineer - Jim Hilton
- Cover Art – Barry Falkner, Brian Crowther
- Cover Photography – Patrick Jobes
- Recording Engineer - Jim Hilton

== Charts ==
=== Weekly charts ===
Chart (1976–1977)	Peak position
Australian (Kent Music Report)	3

=== Year-end charts ===
Chart (1977)	Position
Australian (Kent Music Report)	23

== Certifications ==
Region	Certification	Certified units/sales
Australia (ARIA)	2× Gold	40,000^{^}
^{^} Shipments figures based on certification alone.

== See also ==
- List of Top 25 albums for 1977 in Australia
