= (Until) Your Love Broke Through =

Single by Marcia Hines

from the album Shining
- B-side: "Whatever Goes Around"
- Released: December 1976
- Recorded: 1976
- Genre: Pop music
- Length: 3:15
- Label: Miracle
- Songwriters: Keith Green, Randy Stonehill and Todd Fishkind
- Producer: Robie Porter

Marcia Hines singles chronology
| "Shining" / "In a Mellow Mood" (1976) | "(Until) Your Love Broke Through" (1976) | "What I Did for Love" / "A Love Story" (1977) |

"(Until) Your Love Broke Through" is a song recorded by American-Australian singer Marcia Hines. The song was written by Keith Green, Randy Stonehill and Todd Fishkind and produced by Robie Porter and released in December 1976 as the third single from Hines' second studio album, Shining (1976).

== Track listing ==
7" Single (MS-502)

- Side A "(Until) Your Love Broke Through" (Keith Green, Randy Stonehill & Todd Fishkind) – 3:15
- Side B "Whatever Goes Around" (Al Sharp) – 2:56

== Charts ==
| Chart (1976–77) | Peak position |
|---|---|
| Australian Kent Music Report | 38 |

== Other versions ==
- Phil Keaggy recorded the song on his 1976 album, Love Broke Thru and later on the live album, How the West was One (1977).
- Keith Green recorded it on his debut album, For Him Who Has Ears to Hear (1977).
- Debby Boone recorded it on her debut album, You Light Up My Life (1977).
- Randy Stonehill recorded the song, with an additional verse, for his album, Love Beyond Reason (1985).
- Russ Taff covered the song for a Keith Green tribute album, No Compromise: Remembering The Music Of Keith Green (1993).
- Rebecca St. James covered the song for a Keith Green tribute album, Your Love Broke Through: The Worship Songs of Keith Green (2002). That recording was also released on the compilation album, Wait for Me: The Best from Rebecca St. James (2003).
- The Katinas recorded the song in their album Timeless (2005).
- Matthew Ward covered the song on the Randy Stonehill tribute album There’s a Rainbow Somewhere: The songs of Randy Stonehill (2022).
- There is a German version of the song “Deine Liebe lebt” by Jonathan & Laurent on the self-titled album Jonathan & Laurent (1988).
