= Discothèque (Marcia Hines album) =

Studio album by Marcia Hines
- Released: 30 September 2006
- Recorded: 2006
- Genre: Pop; dance; disco
- Length: 53:33
- Label: Liberation; Warner Music Australia

Marcia Hines chronology
Marcia: Greatest Hits 1975–1983 (2004)	Discothèque (2006)	The Essential Marcia Hines (2007)

Singles from Discothèque
- 1. "Disco Inferno" Released: 2006; 2. "Stomp!" Released: December 2006; 3. "I'm Coming Out" Released: 2007

Discothèque is the eleventh studio album by Australian singer Marcia Hines, released in Australia on 30 September 2006. It peaked at number 6 in Australia.

== Track listing ==
CD

1. "Disco Inferno" (Leroy Green, Ron Kersey) – 3:49
2. "Never Knew Love Like This Before" (James Mtume, Reggie Lucas) – 4:52
3. "Stomp!" featuring Deni Hines – 4:26
4. "Right Back Where We Started From" – 3:14
5. "The Best of My Love" – 3:58
6. "You Should Be Dancing" (Barry Gibb, Robin Gibb, Maurice Gibb) – 4:12
7. "Shake Your Groove Thing" – 3:29
8. "Never Can Say Goodbye" – 3:04
9. "Last Dance" – 4:26
10. "I Can't Stand the Rain" (Ann Peebles, Donald Bryant, Bernard Miller) – 3:10
11. "You to Me Are Everything" – 3:24
12. "Blame It on the Boogie" (Mick Jackson, Elmar Krohn, David Jackson) – 3:50
13. "Let's Groove" – 4:13
14. "I'm Coming Out" (Bernard Edwards, Nile Rodgers) – 3:26

CD Tour Edition (released December 2007)

1. "You" (2005 Remix Edit)
2. "Your Love Still Brings Me to My Knees"
3. "Stomp" (Smash N Grab Club Mix)
4. "Disco Inferno" (David Konsky Radio Edit)

== Personnel ==
- Ian Bell – trombone
- Jessica Bell – violin
- Roger Blayden – design assistant
- Paul Bushnell – bass
- Kieran Conrau – trombone
- Warren Costello – executive producer
- Jim Cox – keyboards
- Paula Reid – backing vocals
- Tania Doko – backing vocals
- Richie Gajate Garcia – percussion
- Shane Gillard – trumpet
- Cameron Hill – violin
- Rachel Homburg – violin
- Edwina Hookey – violin
- Hannah Hookey – string coordinator
- Helen Ireland – viola
- Jeff Jenkins – sleeve notes
- Christina Katsimbardis – violin
- Kylie Liang – violin
- Brian McCloud – drums
- Gary Pinto – backing vocals
- Forrester Savell – bass engineer, drum engineering
- Gregg Spence – trumpet
- Kristian Vidakovic – guitar
- Paul L. Wiltshire – arranger, keyboards, backing vocals), producer, mixing
- Jonathan Wong – violin
- Victoria Wu – producer, vocal editing
- Leon Zervos – mastering

== Charts ==
Discothèque debuted/peaked on the ARIA charts at number 6. It stayed in the chart for over 2 months.

=== Weekly charts ===
Chart (2006)	Peak position
Australian Albums (ARIA)	6

=== Year-end charts ===
Chart (2006)	Position
ARIA Albums Chart	73

== Certifications ==
Region	Certification	Certified units/sales
Australia (ARIA)	Gold	35,000^{^}
^{^} Shipments figures based on certification alone.
