= Jokers and Queens =

Studio album by Marcia Hines and Jon English
- Released: July 1982
- Genres: soul; funk; pop
- Label: Midnight
- Producers: Jon English and Charlie Hull

Marcia Hines albums chronology
Greatest Hits Volume 2 (1982)	Jokers and Queens (1982)	Love Sides (1983)

Jon English chronology
Beating the Boards (1982)	Jokers and Queens (1982)	Some People... (1983)

Jokers and Queens is a collaborative album released by Australian musicians Marcia Hines and Jon English, in July 1982. The album features 3 original and 3 covers and it peaked at number 36 on the Australian Kent Music Report.

The album was re-released on 27 March 2026.

== Background ==
Jon English and Hines had worked together in the 1973/74 Australian production of Jesus Christ Superstar In 1981, English had toured the UK and Scandinavia with a number of Hines' band members.

== Track listing ==
All tracks composed by Charlie Hull and Jon English; except where indicated
Side one

1. "Jokers and Queens"
2. "Ain't Gonna Run"
3. “I Heard it Through the Grapevine” (Norman Whitfield, Barrett Strong)

Side two

1. "This Time"
2. "You Were on My Mind" (Sylvia Fricker)
3. "You've Lost That Lovin' Feeling" (Phil Spector, Barry Mann, Cynthia Weil)

== Weekly charts ==
Chart (1982)	Peak position
Australian (Kent Music Report)	36
