= Ooh Child (album) =

Studio album by Marcia Hines
- Released: June 1979
- Genre: Disco, pop, soul, funk
- Label: Miracle Records
- Producer: Robie Porter

Marcia Hines chronology
Marcia Hines Live Across Australia (1978)	Ooh Child (1979)	Take It from the Boys (1981)

Singles from Ooh Child
- 1. "Let the Music Play" / "Empty" Released: November 1978; 2. "Something's Missing (In My Life)" / "Moments" Released: April 1979; 3. "Where Did We Go Wrong?" / "Dance You Fool, Dance" Released: November 1979

Alternative cover
- European cover

Singles from Ooh Child (European version)
- 1. "Ooh Child" Released: March 1980; 2. "Save the Last Dance for Me" Released: August 1980; 3. "You’re So Good" Released: 1980

Ooh Child is the fourth studio album by American-Australian singer Marcia Hines. Ooh Child peaked at No. 15 in Australia and produced the top ten single, "Something's Missing (In My Life)", which peaked at No. 9. It was released digitally in 2020.

== Track listing ==
Side A
No.	Title	Writer(s)	Length
1.	"Ooh Child"	Bernard Reed, Gene Barge, Morris Jennings, Phil Upchurch	3:40
2.	"Something's Missing (In My Life)"	Paul Jabara	4:37
3.	"You're So Good"	Fred Freeman, Harry Nehls	3:27
4.	"Moments"	Rick Springfield	3:22
5.	"I Wanna Make It with You Tonight"	Mac Davis, Mark James	3:38

Side two
No.	Title	Writer(s)	Length
1.	"Dance You Fool, Dance"	Roberta Twain, Robie Porter, W.D. Kent	5:18
2.	"April Sun in Cuba / Save the Last Dance for Me"	Paul Hewson, Doc Pomus, Mort Shuman	6:06
3.	"Where Did We Go Wrong"	Ron Miller, Tom Baird	4:05
4.	"Let the Music Play"	Frederick Knight	4:25

== Personnel ==
- Arrangements – Al Capps (tracks: A1 - 5, B2, B3), Jimmie Haskell (tracks: B1, B4), Robie Porter
- Arrangement of backing vocals – Mona Lisa Young, Robie Porter
- Arrangement of backing vocals and keyboards – Terry Young
- Bass – David Hungate, Mike Porcaro
- Conductor – Sid Sharp
- Drums – Ed Greene, Willie Ornelas
- Engineer – Jim Hilton
- Engineer assistant and mixdown – Linda Corbin
- Guitar – Bob Mack, Fred Tackett, Lee Ritenour, Paul Sabu, Rick Springfield, Tim May
- Guitar solos – Lee Ritenour
- Keyboards – Al Capps, Jai Winding
- Marimba and vibraphone – Julius Wechter
- Mastering – John Golden
- Percussion – Bob Conti, Carl Friberg, Robie Porter, Steve Forman
- Photography – Patrick Jones
- Synthesizer programming – Jan Lucas

== Charts ==
Chart (1979)	Peak position
Australia (Kent Music Report)	15
