= Take It from the Boys =

Studio album by Marcia Hines
- Released: September 1981
- Genre: Disco, pop, electronic
- Label: Midnight Records/ Warner Music Group
- Producer: David Mackay

Marcia Hines chronology
Ooh Child (1979)	Take It from the Boys (1981)	Greatest Hits (1981)

Singles from Take It from the Boys
- 1. "Your Love Still Brings Me to My Knees" Released: July 1981; 2. "What a Bitch Is Love" Released: October 1981; 3. "Many Rivers to Cross" Released: November 1981 (EU only); 4. "Take It from the Boys" / "Taking It All In Stride" Released: March 1982

Take It from the Boys is the fifth studio album by American-Australian singer Marcia Hines and first on new record label Midnight Records. Take It from the Boys peaked at No. 16 in Australia and produced the top ten single, "Your Love Still Brings Me to My Knees" which peaked at No. 10 in Australia and 6 and 7 in The Netherlands and Belgium.

== Track listing ==
Side A
No.	Title	Writer(s)	Length
1.	"Your Love Still Brings Me to My Knees"	Bobby Wood, Roger Cook	3:34
2.	"Love Me Like the Last Time"	Dan Seals, Rafe Van Hoy	4:18
3.	"Take It from the Boys"	Bruce Roberts, Carole Bayer Sager	3:25
4.	"Many Rivers to Cross"	Jimmy Cliff	4:11
5.	"What a Bitch Is Love"	Barry Blue, Paul Greedus	3:55

Side two
No.	Title	Writer(s)	Length
1.	"I Was Free"	Bob Heatlie	3:42
2.	"Just This One Time"	Jimmy Webb	4:28
3.	"The Dance Goes On"	Daniel Moore	3:38
4.	"It Don't Take Much"	Foxworthy, Ballard, Kerry Charter	3:35
5.	"Taking It All in Stride"	Tom Snow	4:29

== Charts ==
Chart (1981)	Peak position
Australian (Kent Music Report)	16
Dutch Albums Chart	35
