= Music Is My Life (song) =

Single by Marcia Hines

from the album Marcia Hines Live Across Australia
- B-side: "Empty"
- Released: February 1978
- Recorded: 1977
- Genre: Pop music
- Length: 2:07
- Label: Wizard Records
- Songwriters: Robie Porter, Wagner, Marcia Hines
- Producer: Robie Porter

Marcia Hines singles chronology
"You" (1977)	"Music Is My Life" (1978)	"Imagination" / "Shining" (1978)

"Music Is My Life" is a song recorded by American-Australian singer Marcia Hines. The song was written by Porter, Wagner, Hines and produced by Robie Porter. The studio version of the song was released in February 1978 and included on Hines' debut live album, Marcia Hines Live Across Australia (1978).

== Track listing ==
7" Single (MS 510)

- Side A "Music Is My Life" (Porter, Wagner, Hines) - 2:07
- Side B "Empty" (Porter) -

== Charts ==
=== Weekly charts ===
Chart (1978)	Peak position
Australia (Kent Music Report)	28
