= Rain (Let the Children Play) =

1994 single by Marcia Hines

Single by Marcia Hines

from the album Right Here and Now
- B-side: "Nobody Knows"
- Released: 25 July 1994
- Studio: Studios 301 (Sydney)
- Length: 4:12
- Label: WEA
- Songwriter: Robyn Smith
- Producer: Robyn Smith

Marcia Hines singles chronology
"The Lord's Prayer" (1988)	"Rain (Let the Children Play)" (1994)	"Give It All You Got" (1994)

"Rain (Let the Children Play)" is a song by American-Australian singer Marcia Hines. The song was written and produced by Robyn Smith and released in August 1994 as the lead single from Hines' eighth studio album, Right Here and Now (1994).

== Track listing ==
Australian CD single

1. "Rain (Let the Children Play)" (radio edit) – 4:12
2. "Rain (Let the Children Play)" (album version) – 4:42
3. "Nobody Knows" (album version) – 4:28
4. "Nobody Knows" (bonus mix) – 5:33

== Charts ==
Chart (1994)	Peak position
Australia (ARIA)	47
New Zealand (Recorded Music NZ)	35
