= Marcia Shines =

Studio album by Marcia Hines
- Released: October 1975
- Genre: Disco; pop
- Label: Wizard Records
- Producer: Robie Porter

Marcia Hines chronology
Marcia Shines (1975)	Shining (1976)

Singles from Marcia Shines
- 1. "Fire and Rain" Released: April 1975; 2. "From the Inside / Jumpin' Jack Flash" Released: October 1975; 3. "Don't Let the Grass Grow / You Gotta Let Go" Released: June 1976

Marcia Shines is the debut studio album as a solo artist for American-Australian singer Marcia Hines. Hines had been resident in Australia since 1970. Marcia Shines was released in October 1975, and peaked at number 4 in January 1976. Marcia Shines was the biggest selling album by an Australian female artist in 1975. In November 1976, Hines was given a platinum award for this album. It was the highest selling album by an Australian female artist at the time.

== Track listing ==
LP/Cassette

Side A
No.	Title	Writer(s)	Length
1.	"Fire and Rain"	James Taylor	4:39
2.	"Trilogy"	Robie Porter	4:20
3.	"Don't Let the Grass Grow"	David Buskin	4:13
4.	"From the Inside"	Artie Wayne	3:43
5.	"If This Was the Last Song"	Jimmy Webb	3:50

Side B
No.	Title	Writer(s)	Length
1.	"Jumpin' Jack Flash"	Jagger/Richards	4:05
2.	"You Gotta Let Go"	Teddy Randazzo & Victoria Pike	4:30
3.	"But It's Alright"	J J Jackson	2:45
4.	"I Need It Just as Bad as You"	Brian Holland, Lamont Dozier and Eddie Holland, Jr.	2:55
5.	"Easy Evil"	Alan O'Day	4:35

== Charts ==
=== Weekly charts ===
Chart (1975–76)	Peak position
Australian (Kent Music Report)	4

=== Year-end charts ===
Chart (1976)	Position
Australian (Kent Music Report)	18

== Certifications ==
Region	Certification	Certified units/sales
Australia (ARIA)	Platinum	100,000

== See also ==
- List of Top 25 albums for 1976 in Australia
