= Love Sides =

Studio album by Marcia Hines
- Released: late 1982
- Recorded: June 1982
- Studio: The Factory, Woldingham, Surrey
- Genre: Disco; pop; electronic
- Label: Midnight Records/ Warner Music Group
- Producer: David Mackay

Marcia Hines chronology
Jokers and Queens (1982)	Love Sides (1982)	With All My Love (1983)

Singles from Love Sides
- 1. "She Got You" Released: September 1982 (Europe only); 2. "Love Side" Released: October 1982; 3. "Heart Like a Radio" Released: November 1982; 4. "Baby Blue" Released: 1983 (Europe only)

Alternative cover
- European cover

Love Sides is the seventh studio album by American-Australian singer Marcia Hines. The album was her last pop album until 1994 as Hines decided to concentrate on theatre work.

== Track listing ==
Side A
No.	Title	Length
1.	"Love Side"	4:34
2.	"Baby Blue"	4:40
3.	"Get You in My Love"	4:08
4.	"I Remember"	3:26
5.	"Bottom Line"	4:00

Side two
No.	Title	Length
1.	"Heart Like a Radio"	4:08
2.	"Lavender Mountain"	3:32
3.	"She Got You"	3:48
4.	"Shadow in the Night"	3:43
5.	"You Never Told Me Love Hurts"	3:48

- NB: The European release has a different track list order and the inclusion of the track "Many Rivers to Cross".

== Personnel ==
Adapted from album liner.

- Drums – Preston Heyman
- Guitar – Ray Russell
- Bass – Felix Krish
- Synthesizers – Richard Cottle
- Piano – Charlie Hull, Cliff Hall
- Percussion – Barry Guard
