= Artie Wayne =

American singer-songwriter (1942–2019)

Background information
- Born: Wayne Kent; January 22, 1942; New York City, United States
- Died: February 19, 2019 (aged 77) Palm Springs, California, U.S.
- Occupations: songwriter, singer, producer
- Years active: 1959–2008

Artie Wayne (born Wayne Kent, January 22, 1942 – February 19, 2019) was an American record producer, music publisher, songwriter and singer.

His first hit as a songwriter and producer came in 1963 when he co-wrote Joey Powers' "Midnight Mary" for which he received a gold record, signifying that the single had realized $1 million in sales in the U.S.A. Wayne had over 250 covers of his compositions recorded by such artists as Michael Jackson, Aretha Franklin, Tony Orlando and Dawn, Pat Boone, Helen Shapiro, The Magic Lanterns, Joe Dassin, The Temptations, Ricky Nelson, Paul Anka, Cher, and The 5th Dimension.

== Early years ==
Wayne first worked with Bobby Darin in 1959, who sent him to Don Kirshner, who had just formed Aldon Music with producer Al Nevins.

He went on to collaborate with Paul Vance ("Itsy, Bitsy Bikini") and in 1963 co-wrote his first hit, "Midnight Mary" with Ben Raleigh ("Tell Laura I Love Her"). He also produced the single, which was singer Joey Powers' only hit. Wayne also wrote UK top 50 hits by Helen Shapiro ("Queen for Tonight") and The Magic Lanterns ("Excuse Me Baby").

After a short stint as professional manager of publishing at April-Blackwood Music, he was appointed to the same role at the new Kapralik Organisation set up by David Kapralik. While there, he discovered and signed Tony Romeo (who later wrote many Partridge Family hits) as well as Bob Stone (who wrote "Gypsies, Tramps and Thieves" for Cher).

In 1965, Wayne moved to Scepter Records, where he was signed as a writer and produced the Shirelles, the Kingsmen and the Guess Who. When the head of the music publishing company, Ed Silvers, moved to the west coast to join Viva Records, Wayne stayed in New York. Unable to afford to sign Nick Ashford and Valerie Simpson (who went on to write "Ain't No Mountain High Enough," "I'm Every Woman"), with whom he worked at Scepter, he took the duo to Eddie Holland (of Holland/ Dozier/ Holland), who signed them to Motown. In the next four and a half years, Wayne and his partners Sandy and Kelli Ross built Alouette Productions into the top New York publishing administration and exploitation firm of the late sixties. They represented Quincy Jones, (Joey) Levine and (Artie) Resnick, (Gary) Geld and (Peter) Udell, Bobby Scott, Janis Ian, Ron Haffkine, Lesley Gore, and Bo Gentry.

He also recorded under the name Shadow Mann for his own label, Tomorrow's Productions, distributed by Morris Levy. He is also credited with discovering actress Sissy Spacek who recorded for his label under the name Rainbo.

== Hollywood ==
After moving to Hollywood in 1970, he contributed pieces as a photographer and journalist to Rock and Fusion magazines. He also reviewed acts for Cash Box before joining Viva Music as professional manager. When the firm was acquired by Warner Brothers, Wayne became general professional manager and director of creative services for Warner Bros.Music. He directed the New York, Hollywood and Nashville professional staff, which he dubbed "The Warner Raiders." During those years, they represented the works of America, Badfinger, Jackson Browne, Bob Dylan, the Faces, the 5th Dimension, the Kinks, Gordon Lightfoot, Mahavishnu John McLaughlin, Joni Mitchell, Van Morrison, Graham Nash, Randy Newman, Stephen Stills, John Sebastian, Sly and the Family Stone, Carly Simon, Jimmy Webb, Neil Young and the Eagles. He also acted as musical consultant on Warner Bros. Films' Come Back Charleston Blue and Cleopatra Jones.

In 1973 Wayne co-wrote with George Clinton "Little Christmas Tree" for Michael Jackson which was featured on the Motown compilation LP A Motown Christmas which hit the top of the Billboard 200 in 1973, as well as being released as a single in some countries. It is Jackson's only solo Christmas song and has had a number of re-releases. Wayne also co-write "Touch the One You Love" for the star.

The same year he co-wrote "Sending My Good Thoughts to You" with Patti Dahlstrom which was dedicated to their late friend, the singer Jim Croce who had recently died in a plane crash.

When his friend Don Williams from rival publishing company MCA Music played him an acetate of the unreleased Rock Opera, "Jesus Christ Superstar" by Tim Rice and Andrew Lloyd Webber, he sensed it was going to be a phenomenon. Williams, Wayne and their friend Allan Rinde promoted the record to their "underground tastemaker" friends. MCA records as well as Rice and Webber credit the trio with breaking the record in the US.

At the Tokyo Music Festival in 1974, Wayne found a song from South African songwriter Terry Dempsey, "Daydreamer," which David Cassidy recorded selling 5 million units across the world.

When he became the executive director of A+M's publishing company, he represented the songs of Paul Williams, Roger Nichols, Jeff Barry, Peter Allan, Richard Carpenter, John Bettis, and Billy Preston. He also signed newcomer Rick James to an exclusive songwriting contract as well as future Academy Award winner Will Jennings ("My Heart Will Go On"). In his first week after becoming head of Irving/ Almo music he gave Olivia Newton-John "I Honestly Love You" which became the "Record of the Year".

After leaving A+M, he formed the Artie Wayne Organisation, and went around the world selling dance records that were produced for him by David Foster, Jack Conrad, Art Munson and Joe Klein. Also, he was the first American to have his own Japanese record company without having his own label in the US. In his spare time he also represented Joe Klein as agent, who created radio and television ad campaigns for EMI, Capitol, Casablanca, Ariola, K-Tel, and Warner Brothers Records.Wayne also recorded a dance album for Neil Bogart's Casablanca Records under the name Arthur Wayne.

Wayne also won a "CLIO" award (the Grammy of advertising) for co-writing and producing the Radio Record spot of 1983 (with Joe Klein and "Frenchy" Gauthier) for Kenny Rogers "Share Your Love", which featured the phrase, "Fall in Love All Over Again". The slogan has been recycled and used for the past 25 years in film campaigns to promote Sleepless in Seattle, My Best Friend's Wedding, While You Were Sleeping, the 2005 re-release of Disney's Lady and the Tramp, as well as countless ads for music groups, including Simon Cowell's recent number one album El Divo.

In 1983, Allan Rinde, produced the Artie Wayne Songwriter Motivational Course. Among the aspiring songwriters who attended were Jason Bloom (who went on to write for the Backstreet Boys), John Barnes (who went on to co-write much of the "Bad" album with Michael Jackson) and Diane Warren ("Unbreak my Heart", "How Do I Live (Without You)?").

When Rinde decided to open a Chinese restaurant in a predominantly Jewish neighborhood in Hollywood, Wayne gave him the name Genghis Cohen. He was host there intermittently for nine years. He also started a "Wearable Art" clothing business. His clients included ERTE, (the father of Art Deco), Sarah Jessica Parker, Robert Downey Jr., Sammy Davis Jr, "Skunk" Baxter, Pam Tillis, Dokken, Kenny Rogers, J.D. Nicholas of the Commodores, Paul Schaffer, Mötley Crüe and Luther Vandross. He also created wearable art for Fred Segal on Melrose Avenue, Leather Force on Rodeo Drive and Robinson's department stores.

== Later career ==
Wayne went to New York in 1988 to be Director Of Creative Services for Harvey Russack's UNIQUE Clothing Wearhouse in the East Village. He had seven graffiti artists working under him who airbrushed jackets and jeans for the top recording acts New Kids On The Block, First Edition, Bobby Brown, Tiffany, Blackstreet, Aaron Hall, KRS 1, and Mark Wahlberg. Wayne also created a line of successful T-shirts celebrating the new relations between the United States and The Soviet Union, which were spotlighted in Business Week and featured on ABC's 20/20 with Diane Sawyer.

On his return to the West Coast, Wayne performed and presented shows to standing room only crowds at The Genghis Cantina, Allan Rinde's new venture located next to Genghis Cohen.

When Wayne moved to the California desert for health reasons he began to paint/sculpt works on unfinished quartz that were sold in Palm Springs and La Quinta. Until mid-2014, he wrote a blog about his experiences in the music industry that reached an audience of over 2 million.

== Death ==
Wayne died in Palm Springs, California, on February 19, 2019, aged 77.
