= From the Inside (Marcia Hines song) =

Single by Marcia Hines

from the album Marcia Shines
- A-side: "From the Inside"
- B-side: "Jumpin' Jack Flash"
- Released: October 1975
- Recorded: 1975
- Studio: Trafalgar Studios, Sydney
- Genre: Funk; soul; disco
- Length: 3:43
- Label: Wizard
- Songwriter(s): Artie Wayne
- Producer(s): Robie Porter

Marcia Hines singles chronology
"Fire and Rain" (1975)	"From the Inside" (1975)	"Don't Let the Grass Grow" / "You Gotta Let Go" (1976)

"From the Inside" is a song recorded by American-Australian singer Marcia Hines. The song was written by Artie Wayne and produced by Robie Porter and released in October 1975 as the second single from Hines' debut studio album, Marcia Shines (1975). The song became Hines' first top ten single in Australia. Later in 1975 American singer Yvonne Elliman recorded a cover for her album Rising Sun, released later that year.

== Background ==
"From the Inside" was American-Australian singer Marcia Hines' second solo single, which appeared in October 1975 together with her debut album, Marcia Shines. It was written by American songwriter, Artie Wayne for his grandmother, who had told him "You can do it!! It's only life... There's nothin' to it... Just the seein' through it... From the Inside." Robie Porter produced the album and associated singles.

== Track listing ==
7" Single (ZS-142)

- Side A "From the Inside" (Artie Wayne) - 3:43
- Side B "Jumpin' Jack Flash" (Jagger/Richards) - 4:05

== Charts ==
=== Weekly charts ===
Chart (1975/76)	Peak position
Australia (Kent Music Report)	10

=== Year-end charts ===
Chart (1976)	Position
Australian (Kent Music Report)	82
