= Something's Missing (In My Life) =

Paul Jabara and Jay Asher song

"Something's Missing (In My Life)" is a song composed by Paul Jabara and Jay Asher, and recorded by various artists. The song was recorded as a duet with Jabara and Donna Summer in 1978, and appeared on Jabara's album Keeping Time.

== Marcia Hines version ==
"Something's Missing (In My Life)"

Single by Marcia Hines

from the album Ooh Child
- B-side: "Moments"
- Released: 1979
- Genre: Funk; soul; pop
- Length: 4:37
- Label: Miracle; Logo
- Songwriters: Paul Jabara; Jay Asher
- Producer: Robie Porter

Marcia Hines singles chronology
"Let the Music Play" / "Empty" (1978)	"Something's Missing (In My Life)" (1979)	"Where Did We Go Wrong?" / "Dance You Fool, Dance" (1979)

Marcia Hines recorded a version of the track and released it as the second single from her fourth studio album, Ooh Child (1979). It reached the Top 10 in both Australia and New Zealand.

=== Track listing ===
7" single (ZS-153)

1. "Something's Missing (In My Life)" – 4:37
2. "Moments" (Rick Springfield) – 3:22

=== Weekly charts ===
Chart (1979)	Peak position
Australia (Kent Music Report)	9
New Zealand (RIANZ)	5

=== Year-end charts ===
Chart (1979)	Position
Australian (Kent Music Report)	74
Chart (1980)	Position
New Zealand (RIANZ)	46

== Other versions ==
- Karen Carpenter recorded a cover version for an unreleased self-titled solo album.
- Ahmad Jamal also recorded a cover for his album Night Song in 1980.
