= What I Did for Love =

1975 song

"What I Did for Love" is a song from the musical A Chorus Line with music by Marvin Hamlisch and lyrics by Edward Kleban. It was quickly recognized for its show-business potential outside Broadway and was picked up by popular singers to include in their performances in their club and television appearances. Both female and male singers have made it an inclusion in their recorded albums to great effect. The Daily Telegraph described it as a "big anthem".

== Synopsis within A Chorus Line ==
In the penultimate scene of the production, one of the dancers, Paul San Marco, has suffered a possibly career-ending injury. The remaining dancers, gathered together onstage, are asked what they would do if they were told they could no longer dance. Diana, in reply, sings this anthem, which considers loss philosophically, with an undefeated optimism; all the other dancers concur. Whatever happens, they will be free of regret. What they did in their careers, they did for love, and their talent, no matter how great, was only theirs "to borrow," was to be only temporary and would someday be gone. However, the love of performing is never gone, and they are all pointed toward tomorrow.

== Notable versions ==
- Eydie Gormé - a single release in 1976 (US AC #23).
- Jack Jones - in his 1975 album What I Did for Love (US AC #25, Canada AC #23).

== Marcia Hines' version ==
"What I Did for Love"
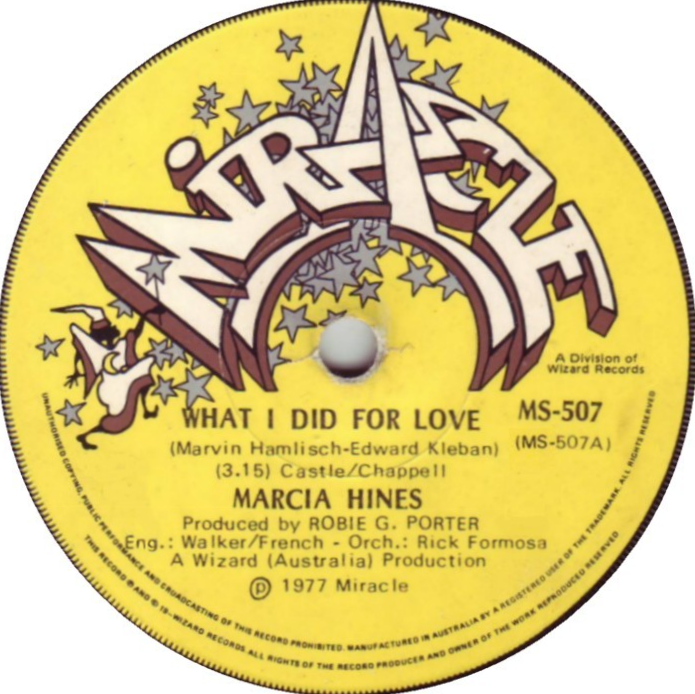

Single by Marcia Hines

from the album Ladies and Gentlemen
- B-side: "A Love Story"
- Released: June 1977
- Recorded: Trafalgar Studios, Sydney, 1977
- Genre: Pop
- Length: 3:15
- Label: Miracle
- Songwriters: Marvin Hamlisch, Edward Kleban
- Producer: Robie Porter

Marcia Hines singles chronology
"(Until) Your Love Broke Through" (1976)	"What I Did for Love" (1977)	"You" (1977)

Marcia Hines recorded and released a version as the lead single from her third album, Ladies and Gentlemen (1977). The song peaked at number 6 on the Kent Music Report, becoming Hines' third top 10 single in Australia.

At the 1978 Australian Record Awards, the song won Hines Female Vocalist of the Year.

== Track listing ==
7-inch single (MS-507)

- Side A "What I Did for Love" - 3:15
- Side B "A Love Story" (Robie Porter) - 3:31

== Charts ==
=== Weekly charts ===
Chart (1977)	Peak position
Australian Kent Music Report	6

=== Year-end charts ===
Chart (1977)	Position
Australia (Kent Music Report)	41
Australian Artist (Kent Music Report)	5
