= I Just Don't Know What to Do with Myself =

1964 hit single for Dusty Springfield

- Solid centre variant of the UK single

Single by Dusty Springfield

from the album Dusty
- B-side: "My Colouring Book"
- Released: June 1964
- Studio: Olympic (London, UK)
- Genre: Pop; soul
- Length: 3:01
- Label: Philips
- Songwriters: Burt Bacharach and Hal David
- Producer: Johnny Franz

Dusty Springfield singles chronology
"All Cried Out" (1964)	"I Just Don't Know What to Do with Myself" (1964)	"Guess Who" (1964)

"I Just Don't Know What to Do with Myself" is a song written by Burt Bacharach and lyricist Hal David. The song was recorded by Dusty Springfield and it reached No. 3 on the UK chart in 1964.

== Composition and early versions ==
The song's life began in 1962 when Bacharach and David were songwriters at the New York songwriting factory the Brill Building.

"I Just Don't Know What to Do With Myself" was first recorded by Chuck Jackson in 1962. This version was shelved and remained unreleased until it appeared on a 1984 compilation on the Kent record label called Mr. Emotion. According to the sleeve notes of that album, Jackson's vocals were subsequently substituted with Tommy Hunt's while the original backing track was retained.

The 1962 release by Tommy Hunt, which featured Hunt singing over the original Chuck Jackson backing track, listed Jerry Leiber and Mike Stoller as producers. It was released as single Scepter 1236 (B-side "And I Never Knew") in May 1962, but did not chart. The song served as the title track for Hunt's sole album release on Scepter released in April 1963. The UK success of Dusty Springfield's June 1964 cover version led to Scepter's re-releasing the Tommy Hunt recording, at which time it reached the Bubbling Under Hot 100 Singles chart in Billboard with a number 119 peak.

== Dusty Springfield version ==
Dusty Springfield recorded "I Just Don't Know What to Do with Myself" in a session at Olympic Studios in Barnes, London with production credited to Philips Records owner Johnny Franz – although Springfield later stated her solo Philips tracks were self-produced. The recording was arranged by Ivor Raymonde who conducted his orchestra, and personnel on the session included Big Jim Sullivan on guitar and Bobby Graham on drums. Springfield, whose first solo recordings had included covers of the Bacharach/David compositions "Anyone Who Had a Heart" and "Wishin' and Hopin'", had brought back "I Just Don't Know What to Do with Myself" from an overnight trip to New York City, where she had met with Bacharach in February 1964.

The third UK single release of Springfield's solo career, following the "Brill Building" Sound-alikes "I Only Want to Be With You" and "Stay Awhile", "I Just Don't Know What to Do with Myself" was Springfield's first UK single release to display her signature vocal style; rising to number 3 in the summer of 1964, the track remained Springfield's highest UK Singles Chart hit until she reached number 1 in 1966 with "You Don't Have to Say You Love Me", Springfield's only UK solo hit to chart higher.

A concurrent US release of Springfield's "I Just Don't Know What to Do with Myself" was preempted by the presence of her recording "Wishin' and Hopin'" in the US Top Ten over the summer of 1964. More than a year later, in October 1965, "I Just Don't Know What to Do with Myself" received a belated US release, featured as a single opposite Springfield's then-current UK hit, "Some of Your Lovin'"; that month Springfield made a promotional junket to the US that included performances of both singles on the American TV music shows Hullabaloo and Shindig, but neither reached the Billboard Hot 100.

=== Charts ===
Chart (1964)	Peak position
Australian Singles Chart	16
Ireland (IRMA)	5
Dutch Singles Chart	5
New Zealand Charts	3
UK Singles Chart	3

== Dionne Warwick version ==
"I Just Don't Know What to Do with Myself"
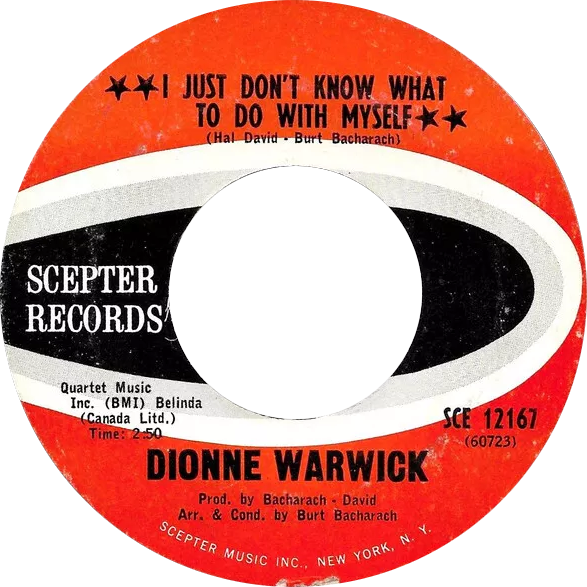
- Side A of the US single

Single by Dionne Warwick

from the album Here Where There Is Love
- B-side: "In Between the Heartaches"
- Released: 19 September 1966
- Recorded: 1966
- Studio: Bell Sound (New York City)
- Genre: Pop; soul
- Length: 2:50
- Label: Scepter
- Songwriters: Burt Bacharach; Hal David
- Producers: Burt Bacharach; Hal David

Dionne Warwick singles chronology
"Trains and Boats and Planes" (1966)	"I Just Don't Know What to Do with Myself" (1966)	"The Beginning of Loneliness" / "Another Night" (1966)

Dionne Warwick recorded "I Just Don't Know What to Do with Myself" at Bell Sound Studios in August 1966 with Burt Bacharach producing; released that September the track is from her third album, Here Where There Is Love on Scepter Records. The song was a moderate success, reaching number 26 on the US Hot 100 and number 20 on US Hot R&B, with its strongest regional success in Detroit after it reached the Top Ten there.

Warwick released three consecutive Bacharach/David songs as singles: "Message to Michael", "Trains and Boats and Planes", and "I Just Don't Know What to Do with Myself". Warwick's next Top 40 single, "Alfie", was also a Bacharach/David song; three of the four songs appeared on Warwick's 1967 album Here Where There Is Love.

=== Track listing ===
- US 7" Vinyl Single

A: "I Just Don't Know What to Do with Myself" – 2:50
B: "In Between the Heartaches" – 2:50

Notes

- "In Between the Heartaches" - Published By – Blue Seas Music, Inc. / JAC Music Co., Inc. (ASCAP)
  "I Just Don't Know What to Do with Myself" - Published By – Quartet Music Inc. (BMI) Belinda (Canada Litd.)

=== Charts ===
Chart (1966)	Peak position
Canada Top Singles (RPM)	36
US Billboard Hot 100	26
US Billboard Hot R&B/Hip-Hop Songs	20
US Cashbox Top 100	24

== Marcia Hines version ==
"I Just Don't Know What to Do with Myself"

Single by Marcia Hines

from the album Shining
- B-side: "Trilogy"
- Released: 1976
- Length: 3:08
- Label: Wizard
- Songwriters: Burt Bacharach; Hal David
- Producer: Robie Porter

Marcia Hines singles chronology
"From the Inside" (1975)	"I Just Don't Know What to Do with Myself" (1976)	"Don't Let the Grass Grow" / "You Gotta Let Go" (1976)

Marcia Hines recorded a version of the track and released it as the lead single from her second studio album, Shining (1976). The B-side "Trilogy" was included on her debut studio album, Marcia Shines (1975).

=== Track listing ===
7-inch Single (ZS-153)

- Side A "I Just Don't Know What to Do with Myself" (Burt Bacharach/Hal David) - 3:08
- Side B "Trilogy" (Robie Porter) - 4:20

=== Weekly charts ===
Chart (1975–1976)	Peak position
Australia (Kent Music Report)	10

=== Year-end charts ===
Chart (1976)	Position
Australia (Kent Music Report)	23

=== See also ===
- List of Top 25 singles for 1976 in Australia

== The White Stripes version ==
"I Just Don't Know What to Do with Myself"

Single by the White Stripes

from the album Elephant
- B-side: "Who's to Say..."
- Released: 1 September 2003
- Recorded: 7 November 2001
- Studio: Maida Vale Studios
- Genre: Punk rock
- Length: 2:46
- Label: V2, XL
- Songwriters: Burt Bacharach, Hal David
- Producer: Jack White

The White Stripes singles chronology
"The Hardest Button to Button" (2003)	"I Just Don't Know What to Do with Myself" (2003)	"There's No Home for You Here" (2004)

Music video
- "I Just Don't Know What to Do with Myself" on YouTube

In September 2003, "I Just Don't Know What to Do with Myself" was released as a single by American alternative rock band the White Stripes. It was the second single released from their album Elephant, reaching the top 40 in New Zealand, the United Kingdom, and on the US Billboard Modern Rock Tracks chart.

The black-and-white music video, directed by Sofia Coppola, cinematographed by Lance Acord and choreographed by Robin Conrad, features Kate Moss pole dancing in black underwear.

=== Track listings ===
UK CD single

1. "I Just Don't Know What to Do with Myself"
2. "Who's to Say..." (Dan Miller)
3. "I'm Finding It Harder to Be a Gentleman" (live on the John Peel Show)

UK 7-inch single

A. "I Just Don't Know What to Do with Myself"
B. "Who's to Say..." (Dan Miller)

UK DVD single

1. "I Just Don't Know What to Do with Myself" (audio)
2. "Lafayette Blues" (audio)
3. "Black Math" (filmed at the Masonic Temple, Detroit)

=== Charts ===
Chart (2003)	Peak position
Australia (ARIA)	54
Netherlands (Single Top 100)	92
New Zealand (Recorded Music NZ)	34
Scottish Singles Sales (Official Charts)	9
UK Singles (Official Charts)	13
UK Indie (Official Charts)	2
US Alternative Airplay (Billboard)	25

=== Release history ===
Region	Date	Format(s)	Label(s)	Ref.
United Kingdom	1 September 2003	7-inch vinyl; CD; DVD	XL	
Australia	15 September 2003	CD	XL	
United States	19 January 2004	Active rock radio	V2	

== Other versions ==
Gary Puckett released a version in 1970, reaching No. 61 in the US and No. 40 in Canada.

A live version of the song performed in 1977 by Elvis Costello and the Attractions appears on the album Live Stiffs Live.

Linda Ronstadt recorded a version of the song and released it in late 1993 on her Winter Light album.

Colin Hay recorded a version of "I Just Don’t Know What to Do With Myself" in 2021 on his album also titled "I Just Don’t Know What to Do With Myself".

== Bibliography ==
- Serene Dominic. Burt Bacharach, Song by Song: The Ultimate Burt Bacharach Reference for Fans. Schirmer Trade, New York 2003. ISBN 0-8256-7280-5
