= You (Marcia Hines song) =

1977 single by Marcia Hines

- Side A of original Australian single

Single by Marcia Hines

from the album Ladies and Gentlemen
- B-side: "In a Mellow Mood"
- Released: October 1977
- Genre: Pop; dance; funk; soul
- Length: 3:07
- Label: Miracle Records
- Songwriter: Tom Snow
- Producer: Robie Porter

Marcia Hines singles chronology
"What I Did for Love" (1977)	"You" (1977)	"Music is My Life" (1978)

"You" is a 1977 single by Australian recording artist Marcia Hines, first recorded by writer Tom Snow on his 1975 Taking It All in Stride LP. "You" was the second single from her third studio album, Ladies and Gentlemen, released in October 1977. It peaked at No. 2 in Australia, and remains Hines' highest-charting single in Australia.

The song was nearly kept from Hines as Robie Porter, the producer, had put the song into his "don't use" pile. Mark Kennedy – her backing band's drummer – saw the sheet music in the studio and began arguing the song's worth to Porter. Porter subsequently changed his mind about the song.

Hines' "You" is a dance song. Her version was not released in North America, and the following year it was covered in the U.S. by Rita Coolidge.

== Track listing ==
7" / 45 RPM single (MS-508)

Side A: "You"
Side B: "In a Mellow Mood"

== Chart performance ==
=== Weekly charts ===
Chart (1977–78)	Peak position
Australia (Kent Music Report)	2

=== Year-end charts ===
Chart (1977)	Rank
Australia (Kent Music Report)	79
Australian Artist (Kent Music Report)	15

Chart (1978)	Rank
Australia (Kent Music Report)	29
Australian Artist (Kent Music Report)	5

== Credits ==
- Engineer – Jim Hilton, Peter Walker
- Orchestrated By – Rick Formosa, Tony Ansell
- Producer, Arranged By, Conductor – Robie G. Porter

== Rita Coolidge version ==
"You"
- US single picture sleeve

Single by Rita Coolidge

from the album Love Me Again
- B-side: "Only You Know and I Know"
- Released: June 1978
- Genre: Soft rock
- Label: A&M Records
- Songwriter: Tom Snow
- Producer: David Anderle with Booker T. Jones

Rita Coolidge singles chronology
"The Way You Do the Things You Do" (1978)	"You" (1978)	"Love Me Again" (1978)

Rita Coolidge covered "You" and released it as the first single from her sixth album, 1978's Love Me Again. Her version, in contrast to Hines', is more mellow in tone. Coolidge's version became a Top 40 hit in both the United States and Canada during the summer of 1978, debuting on the Hot 100 at No. 83 on 1 July 1978 and reaching No. 25 there on 26 August 1978 and No. 17 in Canada. "You" was a major success on the Adult Contemporary charts, reaching No. 3 in the U.S. and No. 1 in Canada. Coolidge's version did not chart in Australia, even though Hines' version had hit there.

=== Chart performance ===
==== Weekly charts ====
Chart (1978)	Peak position
Canada RPM Top Singles	17
Canada RPM Adult Contemporary	1
France (IFOP)	57
New Zealand	36
U.S. Billboard Hot 100	25
U.S. Billboard Adult Contemporary	3
U.S. Cashbox Top 100	17
U.S. Radio & Records	13

==== Year-end charts ====
Chart (1978)	Rank
Canada RPM Top Singles	143
U.S. Billboard Hot 100	162

== 2005 remix versions ==
A digital remix EP was released on 4 March 2005 and was included on the 'Tour Edition' of her album Discothèque.

Digital Download

1. "You" (2005 Remaster) (3:27)
2. "You" (2004 Remaster) (3:17)
