= I've Got the Music in Me =

Single by The Kiki Dee Band

from the album I've Got the Music in Me
- B-side: "Simple Melody"
- Released: 26 July 1974
- Genre: Rock; soul; blue-eyed soul
- Length: 5:00 (Album/Single Version); 3:55 (DJ Edit Version)
- Label: The Rocket Record Company
- Songwriter: Bias Boshell
- Producer: Gus Dudgeon

The Kiki Dee Band singles chronology
| "Hard Luck Story" (1974) | "I've Got the Music in Me" (1974) | "How Glad I Am" (1975) |

"I've Got the Music in Me" is a pop song by the Kiki Dee Band, released in 1974. It was written in 1973 by Bias Boshell, Kiki Dee Band's keyboardist. It is also the title of a Kiki Dee Band album released in 1974 and re-mastered and re-issued with bonus tracks in 2008.

== Background ==
The song is upbeat, describing in various ways how the singer will not be deterred or impeded in their goals, because they possess the quality of 'having the music' in them.

"I've Got the Music in Me" is also noted for its false ending, making the listeners think that the song is over, before the repeated refrains of the song's title bring the song to a fade-out.

== Chart performance ==
The song entered the UK Singles Chart on 7 September 1974, reached number 19 and stayed in the chart for eight weeks. On the Billboard pop chart in the United States, "I've Got the Music in Me" peaked at number 12 on November 30, 1974.

== Chart history ==
=== Weekly charts ===
| Chart (1974) | Peak position |
|---|---|
| Australia KMR | 52 |
| Canada RPM Top Singles | 20 |
| Canada RPM Adult Contemporary | 9 |
| UK (OCC) | 19 |
| US Billboard Hot 100 | 12 |
| US Cash Box Top 100 | 18 |

=== Year-end charts ===
| Chart (1974) | Rank |
|---|---|
| Canada RPM Top Singles | 166 |
| US (Joel Whitburn's Pop Annual) | 119 |

== Personnel ==
- Kiki Dee – Vocals
- Joshie Armstead, Cissy Houston, Maeretha Stewart, Paul Vigrass – Backing vocals
- Mike Deacon – Organ
- Roger Pope – percussion, tambourine
- Jo Partridge – Electric guitar
- Bias Boshell – Piano, electric piano
- Phil Curtis – Bass guitar
- Peter Clarke – Drums
- Phil Dunne – Engineer
- Gus Dudgeon – Producer
- Clive Franks – Assistant producer

== Cover versions ==
- Cascade ("Musiikkisielu") (1975)
- Spagna (as Yvonne K.) (1983)
- Lainie Kazan (1975)
- Barbi Benton (1975)
- Ann-Margret (22 January 1975 The Tonight Show Starring Johnny Carson)
- Marcia Hines (1976), (1978), (1999) and (2024 with Sgt Slick)
- Thelma Houston (1976)
- New Seekers (1976)
- Mighty Clouds of Joy (1976, in a medley with "Superstitious")
- Zdzisława Sośnicka (1976, titled "Moja muzyka to ja" in Polish)
- The Brady Bunch Hour (1976 TV show)
- Heart (1977)
- Tina Turner & Cher (1977, on the TV show "The Sonny & Cher Show")
- Aretha Franklin (1977, as a medley with "Mumbles", from the album Sweet Passion)
- The Hanna-Barbera Happy Hour (11 May 1978)
- Ronnie Milsap (1978)
- Mackenzie Phillips (1978, on One Day at a Time)
- Sheena Easton (1979)
- Ronnie Milsap (1979)
- Lynda Carter (1980)
- Mount Rushmore (1993)
- Jump5 (2004)
- Diana DeGarmo (2004)
- Boogie Pimps (2006)
- Céline Dion (2008)
- Jennifer Lopez (2012)
- Tygers of Pan Tang (2016)
- Jane Levy (2020, on Zoey's Extraordinary Playlist)
