= Marcia Hines =

Australian singer and TV personality (born 1953)

Marcia Hines AM
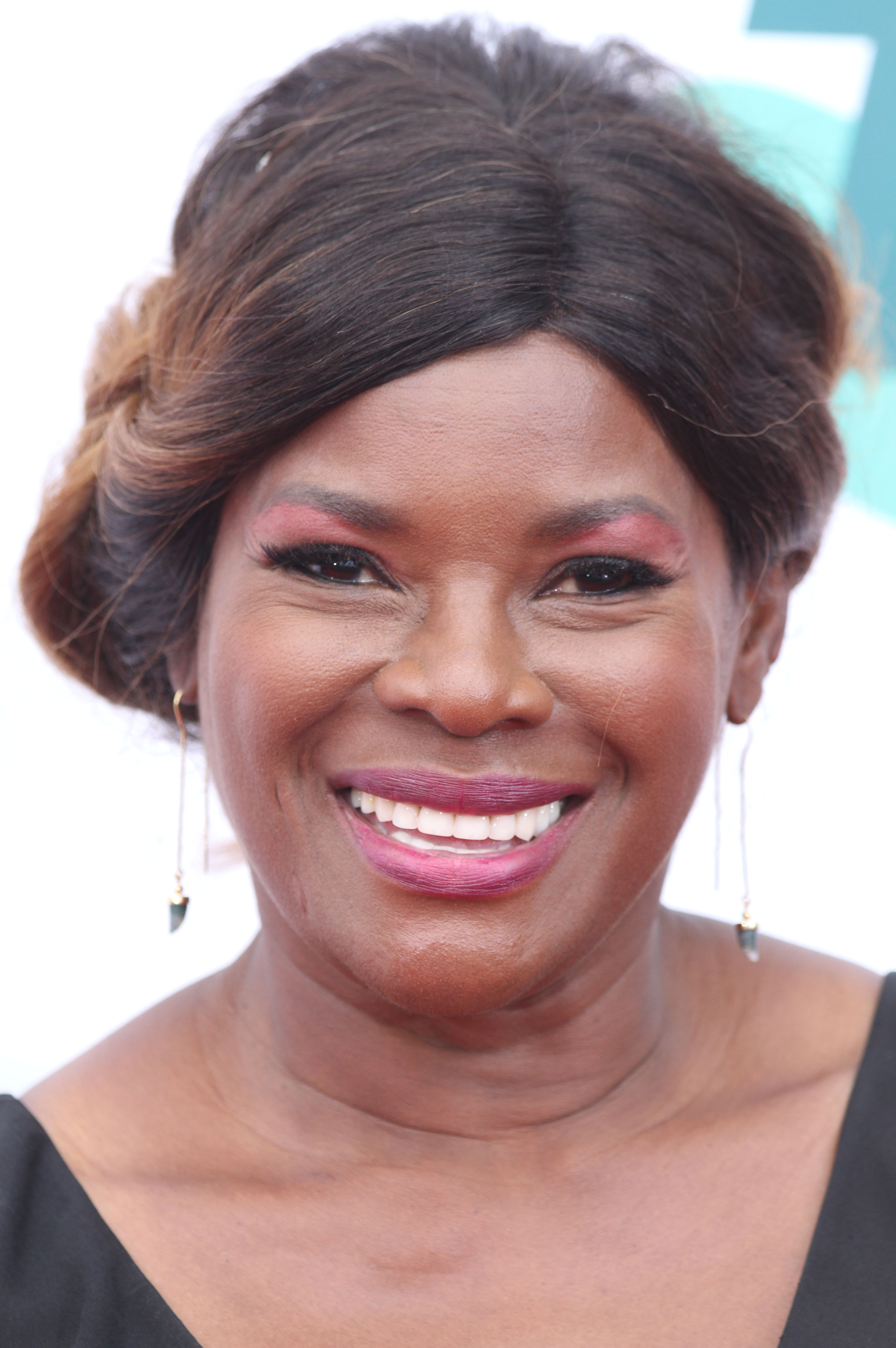
- Hines in 2014

Background information
- Also known as: Shantee Renee; Monica Hindmarsh
- Born: Marcia Elaine Hines; July 20, 1953 (age 73); Boston, Massachusetts, U.S.
- Genres: Pop; disco; R&B; jazz; gospel; funk
- Occupations: Singer, TV personality
- Instrument: Vocals
- Years active: 1967–present
- Labels: Wizard; Warner; Liberation; Universal
- Website: marciahines.com.au

Marcia Elaine Hines AM (born July 20, 1953) is an American-born Australian singer and TV personality. Hines made her debut, at the age of 16, in the Australian production of the stage musical Hair and followed with the role of Mary Magdalene in Jesus Christ Superstar.

She achieved her greatest commercial successes as a recording artist during the late 1970s with several hit singles, including cover versions of "Fire and Rain", "I Just Don't Know What to Do with Myself", "You" and "Something's Missing (In My Life)"; and her Top Ten albums Marcia Shines, Shining and Ladies and Gentlemen. Hines was voted "Queen of Pop" by TV Week's readers for three consecutive years from 1976.

Hines stopped recording in the early 1980s until she returned with Right Here and Now in 1994, the same year she became an Australian citizen. She was the subject of the 2001 biography Diva: the life of Marcia Hines, which coincided with the release of the compilation album Diva. From 2003 to 2009 and again since 2024, she has been featured as a judge on Australian Idol, and her elevated profile led to a renewed interest in her as a performer. Her 2006 album, Discothèque, peaked at number 6 on the Australian Recording Industry Association (ARIA) albums chart. Hines was inducted into the ARIA Hall of Fame on July 18, 2007.

Hines is the mother of singer Deni Hines, with whom she performed on the duet single "Stomp!" (2006). Hines has sold 2.6 million albums and was the first Australian female artist to have a platinum-selling album, as well as the first female to have seven consecutive top 20 album releases.

== Early life ==
Hines was born in Boston, Massachusetts, to Jamaican parents, Eugene and Esmeralda Hines. Eugene died when Hines was six months old due to an operation to remove shrapnel from a war wound. Colin Powell, a former US secretary of state, was her cousin, as is the performer Grace Jones. She was raised with her older brother Dwight by their mother and began singing as a nine-year-old in her church choir. By her teens she was performing with groups in her local area and briefly used the stage-name Shantee Renee. At 14, Hines won a scholarship to the New England Conservatory of Music but left after three months. A month after turning 16, Hines attended the Woodstock Festival. In 1970, at age 16, Hines moved to Australia after landing a role in the Australian stage production of Hair.

== Career ==
=== 1970–1974: Hair and Jesus Christ Superstar ===
At the age of 16, Hines was discovered by Australian entrepreneur Harry M. Miller and director Jim Sharman who were visiting the U.S. to audition African-American singers in preparation for the new season of the Australian stage production of Hair, which had already premiered in Sydney on 6 June 1969. Because she was underage, Miller was made her legal guardian. When she made her debut in April 1970, Hines became the youngest person in the world to play a featured role in any production of Hair. It was produced by Miller and directed by Sharman. Fellow performers included Keith Glass, Sharon Redd, Reg Livermore, John Waters and Victor Willis. During the show's run Hines learned she was pregnant; her daughter, Deni Hines, was born on 4 September 1970, and nine days later Hines returned to the stage to continue her role. The show was a major success. Hines was well received and an Australian tour followed. Miller and Sharman approached her to play Mary Magdalene in the Australian production of Jesus Christ Superstar and Hines assumed the role from Michele Fawdon in the summer of 1973 with Hines's tenure in the role until February 1974 making her a major star in Australia. Other cast members included Trevor White, Jon English, Doug Parkinson, Stevie Wright, John Paul Young and Rory O'Donoghue.

=== 1974–1984: Queen of Pop and beyond ===
When Jesus Christ Superstar finished in February 1974, Hines joined the jazz orchestra Daly-Wilson Big Band, releasing the album Daly-Wilson Big Band featuring Marcia Hines in 1975. Hines's vocals were on the cover songs "Ain't No Mountain High Enough" and "Do You Know What It Means to Miss New Orleans?". Hines toured with Daly-Wilson Big Band from Australia to United States, supporting B. B. King and Wilson Pickett in Los Angeles, then to Europe and into Soviet Union for a month. During late 1974 Hines also performed as the backing vocalist on Jim Keays' solo concept album The Boy from the Stars.

A record contract with Robie Porter's Wizard Records in July 1974 led to Hines's first solo single, a cover version of James Taylor's "Fire and Rain", that peaked at number 17 on the Australian singles charts in May 1975. Five Top Ten singles were released between 1976 and 1979, including her cover versions of Artie Wayne's "From the Inside", Burt Bacharach/Hal David's "I Just Don't Know What to Do with Myself", "What I Did for Love" (from A Chorus Line) and Karen Carpenter's "Something's Missing (in My Life)".

Hines's biggest hit was with Tom Snow's "You", which reached number 2 in the singles charts in Australia in October 1977. It was an up-tempo dance song, later covered in the U.S. by Rita Coolidge. The song, however, nearly didn't make it to Marcia. Robie Porter had put the song into his "don't use" pile. Mark Kennedy, her backing band's drummer (ex-Spectrum, Doug Parkinson in Focus, Ayers Rock), saw the sheet music in the studio and began arguing the songs' worth to Porter. Porter subsequently changed his mind about the song.

Top Ten Australian album chart success also occurred in the 1970s with Marcia Shines peaking at number 4 in January 1976, Shining number 3 in November 1976, Ladies and Gentlemen number 6 in August 1977 and Marcia Hines Live Across Australia number 7 in March 1978. Her albums have sold close to a million copies and Hines was the first Australian female performer to attain a Platinum record.

Hines was voted "Queen of Pop", the country's most popular female performer, each year from 1976 to 1978, by the readers of TV Week. Hines was Australia's best-selling local act for 1977 and 1978, and she was the top concert attraction for 1976–1979 inclusive. Her success had been boosted by appearances on Australian Broadcasting Corporation's (ABC) popular TV music show Countdown. Her touring band, the Marcia Hines Band, included Kennedy, bass guitarist Jackie Orszaczky, lead guitarist Stephen Housden (later of Little River Band) and drummer/percussionist Peter Whitford. Hines was married to Kennedy during the late-1970s; he designed and made an elaborate and colourful stage costume for her. In 1978 and 1979, Hines also had her own TV series, Marcia Hines Music on the ABC.

By November 1979, Hines had fallen out with Wizard Records' owner Robie Porter, and moved on to the Midnight label under Warner Music Australia, after waiting out her contract she returned to recording to achieve a few more hits including the dance track version of Dusty Springfield's "Your Love Still Brings Me to My Knees", which reached Top Ten in 1981. A compilation Greatest Hits, released by Porter's Wizard Records, peaked at number 2 in January 1982. In April 1981, Hines's brother Dwight committed suicide, and Hines later recalled being given the news by her mother.

So she called, so I knew something was very, very, very wrong. So the first thing I said is, 'What's wrong with Deni?' And she said, 'Deni's fine. Your brother's dead.' My mother was to the point, you know, I said, 'What do you mean he's dead?' and I started boo-hooing, and she said, 'Shut up.' She said, 'Look, I took that child through measles, mumps and chicken pox. I gave birth to that child. That's my son, don't cry. Go home and bury him.' And I did just that.

— Marcia Hines, November 16, 2007

Hines combined with fellow Jesus Christ Superstar artist Jon English to release a duet single "Jokers & Queens" and an associated six-track mini-album Jokers and Queens in July 1982. The album reached No. 36 and the single peaked at number 62 on their respective charts. Her next album, Love Sides, and its singles, "Love Side" and "Shadow in the Night", did not chart. Hines returned to theatre for a Jesus Christ Superstar revival in late 1983, and she then decided to devote more time to raising her daughter. During this time, she suffered with health and relationship problems.

=== 1984–1994: Hiatus ===
Theatre projects for Hines, from 1984, included Big River, Are You Lonesome Tonight? and Jerry's Girls. In 1986, a fall in her kitchen resulted in the diagnosis of her diabetes, which was treated by daily injections of insulin, careful monitoring of her diet and a commitment to fitness. Hines performed the closing act of the 1990 Sydney Gay and Lesbian Mardi Gras. It was a turning point for her and she later described the crowd ovation her most pleasing audience reception ever. Hines decided she would return to singing, while her daughter Deni was achieving her own successes initially singing with Rockmelons for their top-five hits "Ain't No Sunshine" and "That Word (L.O.V.E.)" and then solo for her top-five "It's Alright". Hines returned to the stage with a performance in The Masters of Rhythm and Taste in 1993.

=== 1994–2002: Recording again ===
In March 1994, Hines toured nationally for the first time in seven years. She signed a new contract with Warner Music Australia to release Right Here and Now in October, which peaked at number 21; its singles included "Rain (Let the Children Play)", which peaked at number 47, and "Give it All You've Got", which had less success. Her career was gradually revived with concert and TV appearances. By 1998, Hines enlisted Rockmelons' members Bryon Jones and Ray Medhurst as producers for Time of Our Lives, which charted from August 1999 and peaked at number 17. The singles "Flashdance, What a Feeling" (originally recorded by Irene Cara) and "Time of Our Lives" were released with the latter peaking at No. 31. Hines recorded "Rise", an official song for the Australian team at the Sydney 2000 Olympic Games. In September 2001, music producer and writer, Karen Dewey wrote Hines's fully authorised biography Diva: the life of Marcia Hines and Hines released a companion compilation CD, Diva, in October.

=== 2003–2010: Australian Idol and more ===
In May 2003, Hines endured the illness and death of her mother Esme; she returned to the public eye with her role as a judge on the television show Australian Idol from July 27, 2003. She has been described as "the nice judge" and has been accused of being a "fence-sitter" – unable to provide criticism of any kind. Hines counters such criticism with: "Well, you know, I'm living it, if you get my drift, so the advice I give the kids is the advice I'm living." The success of the program has led to further interest in her as a recording artist, and in 2004 she released an album of cover versions, titled Hinesight – Songs from the Journey which featured a duet, with former Home and Away star Belinda Emmett, "Shower the People". In 2005, Hines released a remixed version of her earlier hit "You", followed in 2006 by Discothèque, an album containing her versions of disco classics, which peaked at number 6. Hines made a cameo appearance on Neighbours in early 2007; on 18 July, she was inducted into the ARIA Hall of Fame. In November 2007, Hines released a new album, Life, and during December she toured in support of Lionel Richie. From August 31, 2008, the sixth season of Australian Idol was broadcast, with Hines continuing as a judge, and she is the only judge to appear in every season of Australian Idol.

=== 2010–present: continued success and return to Idol ===
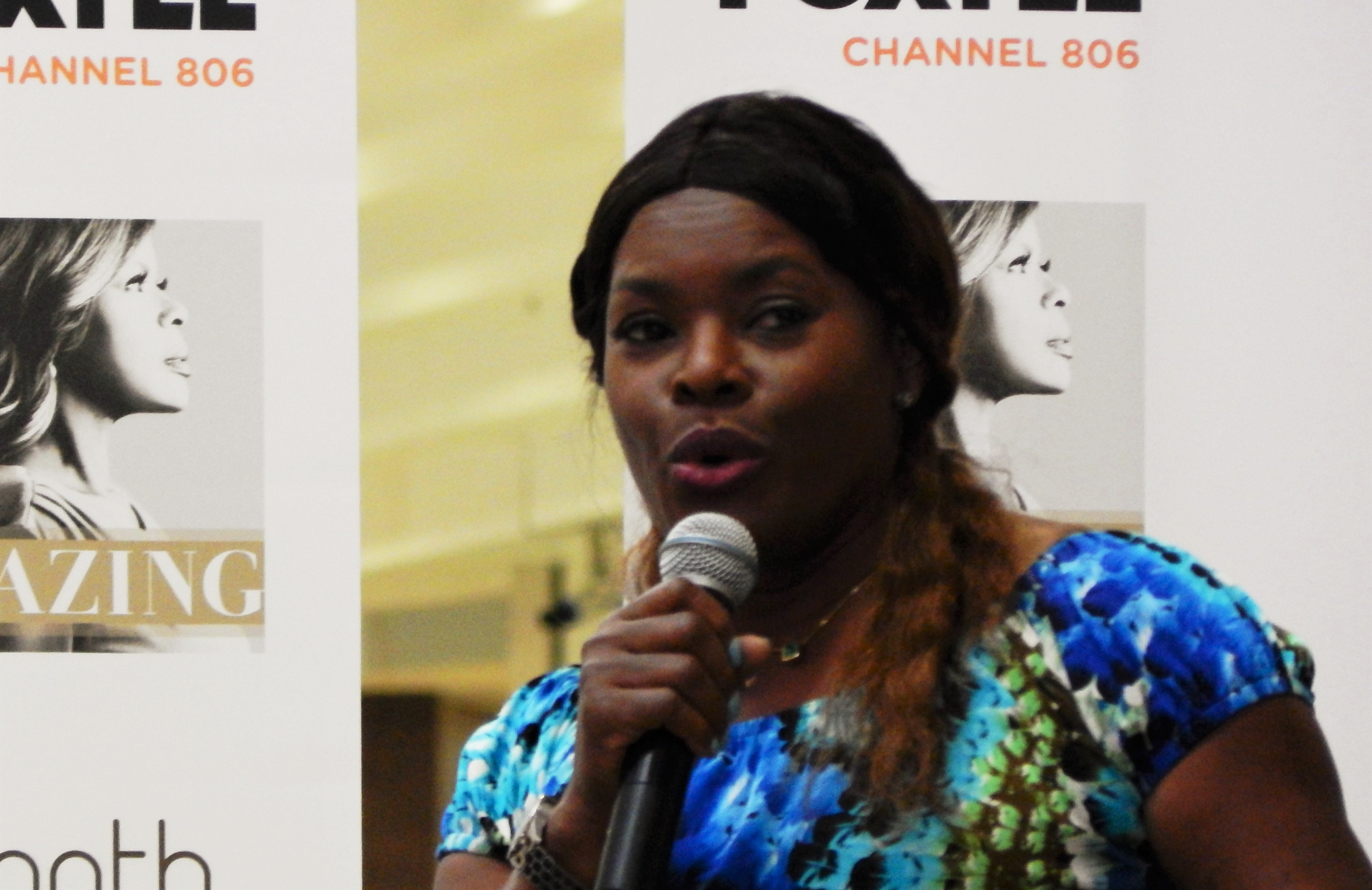
Hines in 2014

In October 2010, Hines released Marcia Sings Tapestry, a tribute to Carole King's 1971 album Tapestry; it peaked at number 16. In April 2014, Hines released her first album of original material in two decades, called Amazing. It spawned three singles and peaked at No. 27 in Australia. In 2015, Hines starred on stage in the disco musical Velvet, with performances at the Adelaide Fringe, Brisbane and Edinburgh. Velvet played at the Sydney Opera House from late 2015. In early 2015, Marcia Hines covered the song "These Boots Are Made for Walkin'", specifically for the trailer of season two of The Real Housewives of Melbourne.

In January 2023, Hines returned to the Channel 7 reboot of Australian Idol, after the show's fourteen-year hiatus, as a judge in the top 50 rounds for three episodes while regular judge Meghan Trainor was in New York due to other commitments. In 2024, Hines rejoined Australian Idol as a main judge alongside returning judges Kyle Sandilands and Amy Shark, permanently replacing Trainor.

Later in 2023, Hines released two songs under the same singles package, which was titled Last One Standing. The two songs were called "Last One Standing" and "Hard to Breathe". These two songs then went on to feature in her brand new greatest hits album, Still Shining: The 50th Anniversary Ultimate Collection, which was officially released in July 2023, through ABC Music. The album was supported by an Australian tour from July to November 2023. On 25 August 2023, Hines released a cover of Bill Withers' "Lean On Me", which featured as the lead single for her forthcoming fifteenth studio album. The album's second single "Loves Me Like A Rock", was released on 13 October 2023. The album, which was titled The Gospel According to Marcia, was officially released on 3 November 2023. Hines has said that the inspiration for the album came when she performed several live shows titled The Gospel According to Marcia Hines alongside a rhythm section and a 12-member choir. These shows received positive reviews inspired Hines to record a gospel album. The Gospel According to Marcia did not reach the ARIA top 50, but peaked at number 15 on the ARIA Australian Artist chart and at number 2 on the Australian Independent Label Albums chart.

In 2025 Marcia appeared as a guest on Sean Micallef's Eve of Destruction on ABC TV. In the show, she revealed she is a collector of golliwogs.

== Personal life ==
Hines has a daughter, Deni Hines, who was born in Australia on September 4, 1970. Hines had been performing in Hair since she was 16 years old. Hines has been married four times: French businessman Andre DeCarpentry, keyboard player Jamie McKinley, businessman Ghassan Bayni, and, in April 2005, she married Christopher Morrissey, whom she divorced in 2014.

Hines grew up with asthma, missing months of schooling as a result of life-threatening attacks, and was diagnosed with Type 1 diabetes after collapsing at her home in 1986. Her elder brother Dwight's death by suicide, in April 1981, devastated Hines, but her mother Esmeralda (Esme) helped her through their grief. Esme relocated to Australia to live with Hines and Deni in the 1980s, and she died in May 2003.

== Discography ==
=== Studio albums ===
- Marcia Shines (1975)
- Shining (1976)
- Ladies and Gentlemen (1977)
- Ooh Child (1979)
- Take It from the Boys (1981)
- Jokers and Queens (with Jon English) (1982)
- Love Sides (1982)
- Right Here and Now (1994)
- Time of Our Lives (1999)
- Hinesight (2004)
- Discothèque (2006)
- Life (2007)
- Marcia Sings Tapestry (2010)
- Amazing (2014)
- The Gospel According to Marcia (2023)

== Awards and nominations ==
=== ARIA Music Awards ===
The ARIA Music Awards is an annual awards ceremony that recognises excellence, innovation, and achievement across all genres of Australian music. They commenced in 1987. Hines was inducted into the Hall of Fame in 2007.

Year	Nominee / work	Award	Result
1989	"The Lords Prayer"	Best Female Artist	Nominated
2000	Time of Our Lives	Best Adult Contemporary Album	Nominated
2007	herself	ARIA Hall of Fame	inductee
2016	Velvet	Best Original Soundtrack, Cast or Show Album	Nominated

=== Australia Day Honours ===
On January 26, 2009, Hines was appointed as Member, Order of Australia "for service to the entertainment industry as a performer, judge and mentor, and to the community through a range of charitable organisations".

=== Australian Women in Music Awards ===
The Australian Women in Music Awards is an annual event that celebrates outstanding women in the Australian Music Industry who have made significant and lasting contributions in their chosen field. They commenced in 2018.

Year	Nominee / work	Award	Result
2019	Marcia Hines	Lifetime Achievement Award	Nominated

=== King of Pop Awards ===
The King of Pop Awards were voted by the readers of TV Week. The King of Pop award started in 1967 and ran through to 1978.

Year	Nominee / work	Award	Result
1976	herself	Queen of Pop	Won
1977	herself	Queen of Pop	Won
1978	herself	Queen of Pop	Won

=== Mo Awards ===
The Australian Entertainment Mo Awards (commonly known informally as the Mo Awards), were annual Australian entertainment industry awards. They recognise achievements in live entertainment in Australia from 1975 to 2016. Marcia Hines won one award in that time.

Year	Nominee / work	Award	Result (wins only)
2004	Marcia Hines	Classic Rock Performer of the Year	Won

=== TV Week / Countdown Awards ===
Countdown was an Australian pop music TV series on national broadcaster ABC-TV from 1974 to 1987, it presented music awards from 1979 to 1987, initially in conjunction with magazine TV Week. The TV Week / Countdown Awards were a combination of popular-voted and peer-voted awards.

Year	Nominee / work	Award	Result
1979	herself	Most Popular Female Performer	Nominated
1981	herself	Most Popular Female Performer	Nominated
