= Robie Porter =

Australian musician (1941–2021)

- Also known as: Rob E.G.
- Born: Robert George Porter; 4 June 1941; Sydney, New South Wales, Australia
- Died: 16 December 2021 (aged 80)
- Genres: Country, pop rock
- Occupations: Musician, producer, record label founder
- Instrument: Lap steel guitar
- Years active: 1959–2019?
- Labels: Rex, Festival, Sparmac, Wizard, Musique

Robert George Porter OAM (4 June 1941 – 16 December 2021) was an Australian country and pop-rock musician, producer and record label owner.

Beginning in 1959, he performed under the stage name Rob E.G. and recorded lap steel guitar instrumentals or covers of country-style vocals. On the local Sydney music charts, he provided four top ten hits including two No. 1 hits with "Si Senor" and "55 Days at Peking". From 1970, Porter ran an independent record label, Sparmac, and produced three LPs for Daddy Cool.

Porter received the Medal of the Order of Australia (OAM) at the 2017 Queen's Birthday Honours for "service to the music industry as a producer, writer and performer".

== Life and career ==
Porter was born in 1941 and raised in Ashfield, New South Wales, a suburb of Sydney. He reluctantly took steel guitar lessons from the age of eight – he wanted to play rugby instead. Sydney TV show Bandstand featured hits from the UK and US played by Australian artists. As Rob E.G., Porter made his TV debut in 1959 performing the lap steel guitar instrumental "Sleep Walk" (originally by Santo & Johnny); he was soon signed to Rex Records and became a Bandstand regular. His first single, "Your Cheatin' Heart", a cover of the Hank Williams hit, appeared in February 1960. In 1961, after receiving severe spinal injuries in a car accident, he adapted his playing style and continued to record. Top ten hits in Sydney include, instrumentals "Si Senor (I Theenk)" which peaked at No. 1 in May 1962, "Jezabel" at No. 2 in May 1963, and "55 Days at Peking" at No. 1 in July; and the vocal single "When You're Not Near" at No. 7 in August 1964. Although not as popular in Melbourne, these four singles also peaked into the top ten.

On the advice of the Beatles' manager, Brian Epstein, Porter moved to the UK in 1964 where he wrote and recorded singles for Festival Records but had no chart success. During 1967 he moved to the US and appeared in several television shows: Malibu U, Popendity, Daniel Boone, Mannix and The Immortal. In 1969 Porter co-starred in the movie Three.

In 1970, Porter was back in Australia where he purchased a controlling share of independent record label Sparmac. He recorded three of his own singles for Sparmac before focusing on managing and promoting bands and producing records. Porter produced three of doo wop rock band Daddy Cool's LPs including their debut 1971 album, Daddy Who? Daddy Cool, which peaked at No. 1 and became the highest selling Australian album at the time. Other Sparmac artists included Rick Springfield and Healing Force. In 1973, Porter started a new label, Wizard, in partnership with Steve Binder, Daddy Cool and Springfield. The new label also signed Hush, Mighty Kong and Marcia Hines. Porter and Binder also managed Springfield and introduced him to the US market.

Porter co-wrote the song "Shining" with Jill Wagner-Porter, which was recorded by Marcia Hines on her 1976 LP album Shining, and also wrote "Empty" and "A Love Story" on that album.

In the 1980s, Porter produced albums for Air Supply, Tommy Emmanuel and the Nauts. He returned to the US to live and worked in television production and as a horse breeder. During 2006, Porter formed another record label, named Musique, with flautist Jane Rutter.

He died after suffering from dementia on 16 December 2021 at the age of 80.

== Discography ==
=== Albums ===
- Playing Hawaiian Guitar – Festival (FL31338) (1964)
- The Voice and the Guitar: The Vocal & Instrumental Hits of – Festival (FL31473) (1964)
- Australia's Great Singing Star – MGM (E/SE 4397) (1966)
- The Heart of the Matter – MGM (E/SE-4458) (1966)
- Sings – Festival FL-32041 (1968)
- The Guitar Sounds of – Summit (SRA 250 049) (1970)
- 5,4,3,2,1: The Festival File – Festival (L-19003) (1988)

=== EPs ===
- Rob E.G.'s Big 4 - Festival (FX-10480) (1962)
- 55 Days at Peking - Festival (FX-10734) (December 1963)
- The Great Instrumentals – Festival (FX-10809) (July 1964)
- Adventures in Paradise – Festival (FX-10869) (December 1964)
- Hawaii Tattoo – Festival (FX-10995) (December 1964)
- Sings Country and Western – Festival (FX-10527) (1965)

=== Singles ===
(released as Rob E. G.)

- "Your Cheatin' Heart"/"Seven Foot Two" – Rex (RS-007) (1960)
- "Do You Love Me"/"Whiplash" – Pye (PP-056) (August 1960)
- "My First Love"/"Railroadin'" – Pye (PP-056) (December 1960)
- "Si Senor (I Theenk)"/"SwanRiver (Twist)" – Festival (FK-210) (1962)
- "5-4-3-2-1 Zero"/"Jamacian Farewell" – Festival (FK-274) (1962)
- "Jezebel"/"Road to Cimmaron" – Festival (FK-358) (May 1963)
- "55 Days at Peking"/"Greenhorn" – Festival (FK-403) (June 1963)
- "Soul"/"Cotton Pickin'" – Festival (FK-480) (1963)
- "Carmen"/"Senorita" – Festival (FK-533) (March 1964)
- "Tim-buc-too"/"Adventures in Paradise" – Festival (FK-634) (May 1964)
- "When You're Not Near"/"Aloha Oe" – Festival (FK-677) (July 1964)
- "Dear Miss Honey"/"When You're in Love" – Festival (FK-1189) (1966)

(released as Robie Porter)

- "I've Often Wondered"/"Heartache, Hurry On By" – Festival (FK-1324) (1966)
- "Either Way I Lose"/"Born" – Festival (FK-1429) (1966)
- "Either Way I Lose"/"Let It Be Me" – MGM (MGM 1313, UK) (1966)
- "I Haven't Got Anything Better to Do"/"No One Lives in My World" – Festival (FK-1743) (March 1967)
- "That's the Way Love Is"/"Yesterday Years" – Festival (FK-1959) (1967)
- "You Could End the World"/"Sure Has Been Good Lovin' You Baby" – Festival (FK-2112)(January 1968)
- "Writing's on the Wall"/"If You'd Let Me" – Festival (FK-2318) (April 1968)
- "Gemini"/"He Is Not Me" – Sparmac (SPR003) (August 1970) AUS #28
- "Santa Claus (and We Love Him)"/"Funky Version" – Sparmac (SPR006) (1970)
- "Try to Find More Love (There Must Be a Reason)"/"Empty" – Sparmac (SPR007) (March 1971) AUS #90
