= Songbird (Marina Prior box set) =

2014 album by Marina Prior

Box set by Marina Prior
- Released: 4 April 2014
- Recorded: 2012–14
- Genres: Musical theatre, show tune, pop
- Label: FanFare Records

Marina Prior chronology
Candlelight Christmas (2013)	Songbird (2014)	Marina Prior Live (2014)

Songbird is a three-disc, limited edition box set by Australian singer Marina Prior. The album was released in Australia in April 2014.

The Songbird box includes Marina's three albums, Both Sides Now (2012), Encore (2013) and Marina Prior Live, a new album recorded at The Glasshouse in Port Macquarie in 2013. The Box Set is named from the extra track, "Songbird", originally penned by Christine McVie and performed by Fleetwood Mac. It was also released a single.

Prior promoted the album with a 26-date national tour commencing in Launceston in August. It concluded in December 2014.

On the tour, Prior's performed her best-loved songs from throughout her career, accompanied by pianist David Cameron.

== Track listing ==
CD 1 - Both Sides Now (2012)

1. "The Man with the Child in His Eyes" - 3:22
2. "Scarborough Fair" - 3:42
3. "You Weren’t in Love With Me"- 3:33
4. "Superstar" - 4:31
5. "Both Sides, Now" - 4:21
6. "Midnight at the Oasis" - 3:30
7. "In My Life" / "Here Comes the Sun"- 3:41
8. "Love the One You're With" - 3:21
9. "Waters Of Babylon" - 2:33
10. "River" - 4:13
11. "Day You Went Away" - 3:58
12. "Windmills of Your Mind" - 3:31
13. "Killer Queen" - 3:09
14. "SOS" - 4:43

CD 2 - Encore (2013)

1. "Meadow Lark" (from The Baker's Wife) - 5:19
2. "I'll Never Fall in Love Again" (from Promises, Promises) - 3:34
3. "When He Loved Me" (from Toy Story 2) - 3:21
4. "So in Love" (from Kiss Me Kate) - 3:48
5. "Dream Medley" - Climb Every Mountain (from The Sound of Music), "Out of My Dreams" (from Oklahoma), "I Have Dreamed" (from The King and I) - 3:39
6. "Memory" (from Cats) - 4:07
7. "Tomorrow" (from Annie) - 3:18
8. "Edelweiss (from The Sound of Music) - 1:53
9. "Before I Gaze at You Again" (from Camelot) - 3:14
10. "I Dreamed a Dream" (from Les Misérables) - 3:36
11. "The Winner Takes It All" (from Mamma Mia) - 4:42
12. "Music of the Night" (from The Phantom of the Opera) - 4:49

CD 3 - Live (2014)

1. "Overture" - 1:03
2. "Both Sides Now" - 4:22
3. "Memory" - 4:11
4. "I Love a Piano" - 3:18
5. "Celtic Medley" ("He Moved Through the Fair", "Heigh Diddle Dum", "Danny Boy") - 10:04
6. "The Winner Takes It All" - 4:06
7. "I Dreamed a Dream" - 3:32
8. "Rogers & Hammerstein Medley" ("Climb Every Mountain", "I Have Dreamed", "Out Of My Dreams") - 3:36
9. "The Music Of The Night" - 5:22
10. "Auld Lang Syne" - 2:09
11. "Time to Say Goodbye" - 4:27
12. "Songbird" (Bonus Track) - 3:06

== Release history ==
Region	Date	Format	Edition(s)	Label	Catalogue
Australia	4 April 2014	CD	Standard	Fanfare	FANFARE129
