= Leading Lady: The Ultimate Collection =

2015 album by Marina Prior

Greatest hits album by Marina Prior
- Released: 14 August 2015
- Recorded: 2011−2013
- Genres: Musical theatre, show tune, pop
- Label: Ambition Entertainment

Marina Prior chronology
Marina Prior Live (2014)	Leading Lady: The Ultimate Collection (2015)	Together (2016)

Leading Lady: The Ultimate Collection is the third greatest hits album by Australian singer Marina Prior. The album was released in August 2015.

Marina promoted the album with concerts in Brisbane. She said; “I'll be doing show songs, so I'll be singing from 'Phantom [Of The Opera]', 'Les Miserable', 'Cats', 'West Side Story' and then some Celtic Folk music, which is the music I sort of grew up with. So I do a whole lot of Irish songs… so it's a real mix and there's a bit of Opera cross-over sort of stuff. Basically it's just all of my favourite songs!"

Prior became the "Leading Lady [of Australian theatre]" after show stopping performances in musicals such as Les Misérables, Phantom Of The Opera, Cats, The Pirates of Penzance, The Student Prince, Anything Goes, West Side Story, The Secret Garden, Show Boat, Annie Get Your Gun, Dirty Rotten Scoundrels, and Mary Poppins.

Prior was signed to Sony Music Australia in 1991 and released three albums over the next three years that sold over 160K copies combined. She released three more studio and a live album with Ambition Entertainment between 2012-2014.

In 2006, Prior was announced in Australia's 100 Entertainers of the Century.

Leading Lady: The Ultimate Collection includes tracks from three Ambition Entertainment albums: Both Sides Now (2012), Encore (2013) and Marina Prior Live (2014).

== Track listing ==
CD/DD

1. "Meadow Lark" (from The Baker's Wife) - 5:19
2. "I'll Never Fall in Love Again" (from Promises, Promises) - 3:34
3. "When He Loved Me" (from Toy Story 2) - 3:21
4. "So in Love" (from Kiss Me Kate) - 3:48
5. "Dream Medley" - Climb Every Mountain (from The Sound of Music), "Out of My Dreams" (from Oklahoma), "I Have Dreamed" (from The King and I) - 3:39
6. "Memory" (from Cats) - 4:07
7. "Tomorrow" (from Annie) - 3:18
8. "Edelweiss (from The Sound of Music) - 1:53
9. "Before I Gaze at You Again" (from Camelot) - 3:14
10. "I Dreamed a Dream" (from Les Misérables) - 3:36
11. "The Winner Takes It All" (from Mamma Mia) - 4:42
12. "Music of the Night" (from The Phantom of the Opera) - 4:49
13. "Both Sides, Now" - 4:21
14. "Vincent" - 4:11
15. "Songbird" - 3:06
16. "The Carnival is Over" - 3:17
17. "Time in the Bottle"- 2:58
18. "Windmills of Your Mind" - 3:31
19. "Auld Lang Syne" (Featuring Celtic Woman) - 4:23
20. "Time to Say Goodbye" (live in concert) - 4:27

== Release history ==
Region	Date	Format	Edition(s)	Label	Catalogue
Australia	14 August 2015	CD; digital download	Standard	Ambition Entertainment	FANFARE169
