= Best So Far =

2014 album by Mark Vincent

Greatest hits album by Mark Vincent
- Released: 25 April 2014
- Genre: Classical
- Length: 61:35
- Label: Sony Music Australia

Mark Vincent chronology
The Quartet Sessions (2013)	Best So Far (2014)	Together (2016)

Best So Far is a greatest hits album by Australian tenor, Mark Vincent. The album was released through Sony Music Australia on 25 April 2014 and peaked at number 15 on the ARIA Charts.

== Background and release ==
Mark Vincent was 15 years old when he first came onto the scene singing "Nessun Dorma" on the program Australia's Got Talent in 2009. He was declared the winner in April and has released five studio albums between 2009 and 2013; all of which have charted within the top 20 on the Australian ARIA Chart. To celebrate his upcoming 21st birthday, Sony Music Australia released his first 'best of' compilation titled Best So Far.

== Track listing ==
1. "Nessun Dorma" - 3:13
2. "Hallelujah" - 3:23
3. "You Raise Me Up" - 4:04
4. "This is the Moment" - 3:18
5. "Music of the Night" - 5:30
6. "Nella Fantasia" - 4:35
7. "Funiculi Funicula" - 2:50
8. "O Sole Mio" - 3:25
9. "The Impossible Dream" - 5:06
10. "Young at Heart" - 2:48
11. "Non Ti Scordar Di Me" - 3:07
12. "Time to Say Goodbye" - 4:08
13. "Besame Mucho" - 3:53
14. "Ave Maria" - 4:39
15. "Crying" - 3:58
16. "Look Inside" - 3:38

== Weekly charts ==
Chart (2014)	Peak position
Australian Albums (ARIA)	15
Australian Artist Album Chart	6
Australian Classical Album Chart	1

== Release history ==
Region	Date	Format	Label	Catalogue
Australia	25 April 2014	CD; digital download	Sony Music Australia	88843072242
