= All I Ask of You (album) =

Greatest hits album by Marina Prior
- Released: 17 April 2006
- Recorded: 1992–1994
- Genres: Musical theatre, show tune
- Label: Sony BMG

Marina Prior chronology
Somewhere – The Songs of Sondheim and Bernstein (1994)	All I Ask of You (2006)	The Essential Marina Prior (2010)

All I Ask of You is the first greatest hits album by Australian singer Marina Prior. The album was released on 17 April 2006. Prior is considered to be the leading lady of Australian theatre and has received numerous awards, including Green Room Awards, Mo Awards and in 1993, she received the Advance Australia Award for her contribution to the performing arts.

The album features tracks from her three studio albums; Leading Lady, Aspects of Andrew Lloyd Webber and Somewhere – The Songs of Sondheim and Bernstein.

The album was released a month prior to Prior commencing her role as a judge on the Australian television series It Takes Two. It also follow's the announcement of Australia’s 100 Entertainers of the Century which took place in April, in which Prior was included.

== Track listing ==
CD1

1. "Friends For Life (Amigos Para Siempre)"
2. "All I Ask Of You"
3. "Somewhere Over The Rainbow"
4. "I Dreamed A Dream"
5. "Another Suitcase Another Hall"
6. "Love Changes Everything"
7. "You Could Drive A Person Crazy"
8. "Move On"
9. "Losing My Mind"
10. "Pie Jesu"
11. "Not While I'm Around"
12. "Half A Moment"
13. "Wishing You Were Somehow Here Again"
14. "If I Loved You"

CD2

1. "Memory"
2. "Don't Cry For Me Argentina"
3. "I Don't Know How To Love Him"
4. "Music Of The Night"
5. "Moonfall"
6. "Can't Help Lovin' Dat Man"
7. "Before I Gaze At You Again"
8. "Somewhere"
9. "What Can You Lose"
10. "Nothing Like You've Ever Known"
11. "Sooner Or Later"
12. "Seeing Is Believing"
13. "Send In The Clowns"

== Release history ==
Region	Date	Format	Label	Catalogue
Australia	17 April 2006	Compact Disc	Sony BMG	CDR0541
