= Leading Lady =

Leading Lady may refer to:

- Leading lady
- Leading Lady (film), a 2014 comedy drama film
- Leading Lady (album), a 1991 album by Marina Prior
- Leading Lady: The Ultimate Collection, a greatest hits album by Marina Prior 2015
- "Leading Lady", a 1975 song by Iva Davies
- "Leading Lady", a song by Ruben Studdard from the album Letters from Birmingham
- Leading Lady, Stephen Galloway biography of movie executive Sherry Lansing

== See also ==
- Leading Ladies (disambiguation)
