= Marina Prior Live =

2014 album by Marina Prior

Live album by Marina Prior
- Released: 5 December 2014
- Recorded: The Glasshouse in Port Macquarie; 2 August 2013
- Label: FanFare

Marina Prior chronology
Songbird (2014)	Marina Prior Live (2014)	Leading Lady: The Ultimate Collection (2015)

Marina Prior Live is the first live album by Australian singer Marina Prior. The album was previously only available via her box set Songbird, but it was released individually on CD and music download in December 2014. The live DVD was released in November 2013.

== Background and release ==
2013 marked the first time Marina embarked on a national tour. She celebrating the release of album, Encore. She toured nationally, performing to sold-out theatres. Reviews for the show were overwhelming positive; “Marina Prior shows vocal power that has made her such a popular star” – The Age, “A force in Australian musical theatre” - Sydney Morning Herald, “Prior’s voice is both distinctive and timeless” - Adelaide Advertiser, "She had the crowd eating out of her hands”– The West Australian, “Musical diva Marina Prior is triumphant”–Variety.

The concert was recorded at The Glasshouse in Port Macquarie, on 2 August 2013.

Geoff McGahan mixed the live recording said; "I had the great pleasure to mix Marina Prior’s Live DVD recorded live in the Glasshouse Theatre, Port Macquarie. Marina’s vast repertoire includes musical theatre, jazz, contemporary, and light opera. This honestly was a truly captivating live performance and fantastic to be involved with and work on. A true professional!"

== Track listing ==
CD/DD

1. "Overture" - 1:03
2. "Both Sides Now" - 4:22
3. "Memory" - 4:11
4. "I Love a Piano" - 3:18
5. "Celtic Medley" ("He Moved Through The Fair", "Heigh Diddle Dum", "Danny Boy") - 10:04
6. "The Winner Takes It All" - 4:06
7. "I Dreamed a Dream" - 3:32
8. "Rogers & Hammerstein Medley" ("Climb Every Mountain", "I Have Dreamed", "Out Of My Dreams") - 3:36
9. "The Music of the Night" - 5:22
10. "Auld Lang Syne" - 2:09
11. "Time to Say Goodbye" - 4:27
12. "Songbird" (Bonus Track) - 3:06

DVD

1. "Overture"
2. "Both Sides Now"
3. "Memory"
4. "I Love a Piano"
5. "Before I Gaze at You Again"
6. "Scarborough Fair"
7. "When Somebody Loved Me"
8. "Celtic Medley"
9. "Meadowlark"
10. "You Weren't in Love with Me"
11. "The Winner Takes it All"
12. "I Dreamed a Dream"
13. "River"
14. "Rogers and Hammerstein Medley"
15. "The Music of the Night"
16. "Auld Lang Syne"
17. "Time to Say Goodbye"

== Release history ==
Region	Date	Format	Label	Catalogue
Australia	8 November 2013	DVD	FanFare	FANFARE120
Australia	5 December 2014	CD/DD	FanFare	FANFARE131
