= Candlelight Christmas =

Studio album by Marina Prior
- Released: 8 November 2013
- Genre: Christmas music
- Label: Ambition Entertainment/Universal Music Australia

Marina Prior chronology
Encore (2013)	Candlelight Christmas (2013)	Songbird (2014)

Candlelight Christmas is the sixth studio album and first Christmas album by Australian singer Marina Prior. The album was released through on 8 November 2013 and peaked at number 46 on the ARIA Albums Chart three weeks later.

Upon release, Prior said; "I have been singing on Carols by Candlelight for over two decades now and finally I have recorded my first Christmas Album. I cherish these songs and hope that they bring you a great deal of enjoyment. Christmas is a special time of year to be shared with friends, family and loved one's. This album is from me to you..... A very special christmas wish of happiness."

A music video for "Little Drummer Boy" was released on 9 November 2013 to promote the album.

The album was re-released in 2016 with a bonus DVD of Live in Concert, recorded in 2013.

== Track listing ==
1. "Santa Baby"
2. "Away in a Manger"
3. "Little Town of Bethlehem"
4. "Have Yourself a Merry Little Christmas"
5. "River"
6. "Happy Christmas"
7. "Little Drummer Boy"
8. "Mary's Boy Child"
9. "Coventry Carol"
10. "Silent Night"
11. "Oh Come All Ye Faithful"
12. "Veni Veni Emmanuel"
13. "Angels We Have Heard on High" (With The Melbourne Staff Songsters & Band of the Salvation Army) (Bonus track)
14. "Auld Lang Syne" (With Celtic Woman) (Bonus track)

== Charts ==
Chart (2013)	Peak position
Australian Albums (ARIA)	46
Australian Artist Albums (ARIA)	14

== Release history ==
Region	Date	Title	Format	Label	Catalogue
Australia	8 November 2013	Candlelight Christmas	CD; digital download	Fanfare / Universal Music Australia	FANFARE127
Australia	2016	A Christmas Gift	CD+DVD	Fanfare / Universal Music Australia	FANFARE269
Australia	28 October 2022	A Christmas Gift (re-release)	CD+DVD	Ambition Entertainment	AMBITION195
