= The Most Wonderful Time of the Year =

The Most Wonderful Time of the Year may refer to:

- The Most Wonderful Time of the Year (2008 film), a Christmas-themed television film
- The Most Wonderful Time of the Year (2024 film), a Simpsons short film
- The Most Wonderful Time of the Year (Mormon Tabernacle Choir album), 2010
- The Most Wonderful Time of the Year (Take 6 album), 2010
- The Most Wonderful Time of the Year (Scott Weiland album), 2011
- The Most Wonderful Time of the Year (Mark Vincent album), 2018
- "It's the Most Wonderful Time of the Year", a popular Christmas song written in 1963
