= Both Sides Now (disambiguation) =

"Both Sides, Now" is a song by Joni Mitchell.

Both Sides Now may also refer to:

- Both Sides Now (Joni Mitchell album), 2000
- Both Sides Now (Adam Harvey album), 2009
- Both Sides Now (Marina Prior album), 2012
- Both Sides Now (Willie Nelson album), 1970
- "Both Sides Now", a song from the Sammy Hagar album Marching to Mars, 1997
- "Both Sides Now" (House), television series episode
- "Both Sides Now", an episode of the US TV series Outlander
- "Both Sides Now", an episode of the US TV series Supergirl (season 3)
- "Both Sides Now", an episode of the US TV series Counterpart
