= Encore (Marina Prior album) =

Studio album by Marina Prior
- Released: 12 April 2013
- Genres: Musical theatre, show tune
- Label: Ambition Entertainment/ Universal Music Australia

Marina Prior chronology
Both Sides Now (2012)	Encore (2013)	Candlelight Christmas (2013)

Encore is the fifth studio album by Australian singer Marina Prior. the album was released in April 2013. The album is described as having an 'unplugged' feel to it, with acoustic arrangements. Some of the songs are from Prior's career and some are brand new to her repertoire.

Prior toured the album nationally from September to November 2013. The Encore Show sees Prior in a back to basic mode. "I've worked with big orchestras and bands and that's always wonderful, but this is a very intimate and informal show," she said.

== Track listing ==
CD/ DD

1. "Meadow Lark" (from The Baker's Wife) - 5:19
2. "I'll Never Fall in Love Again" (from Promises, Promises) - 3:34
3. "When He Loved Me" (from Toy Story 2) - 3:21
4. "So in Love" (from Kiss Me Kate) - 3:48
5. "Dream Medley" - Climb Every Mountain (from The Sound of Music), "Out of My Dreams" (from Oklahoma), "I Have Dreamed" (from The King and I) - 3:39
6. Memory (from Cats) - 4:07
7. "Tomorrow" (from Annie) - 3:18
8. "Edelweiss (from The Sound of Music) - 1:53
9. "Before I Gaze at You Again" (from Camelot) - 3:14
10. "I Dreamed a Dream" (from Les Misérables) - 3:36
11. "The Winner Takes It All" (from Mamma Mia) - 4:42
12. "Music of the Night" (from The Phantom of the Opera) - 4:49

== Release history ==
Region	Date	Format	Label	Catalogue
Australia	12 April 2013	CD / Digital Download	Ambition Entertainment / Universal Music Australia	FANFARE093
