= My Dream – Mio Visione =

Studio album by Mark Vincent
- Released: 2 July 2009
- Genre: Classical
- Length: 41:07
- Label: Sony Music Australia
- Producer: Chong Lim

Mark Vincent chronology
My Dream – Mio Visione (2009)	Compass (2010)

My Dream – Mio Visione is the debut studio album by Australian tenor, Mark Vincent. The album was released through Sony Music Australia on 2 July 2009 and peaked at number 2 on the ARIA Charts. The album was certified platinum.

== Background and release ==
Mark Vincent auditioned for and won Australia's Got Talent in April 2009 after singing "Nessun Dorma". He was signed to Sony Music Australia following the win. Vincent’s talent was originally noticed by his late grandfather. As a boy, he used to sing along to opera albums, which then progressed to singing in his family’s Italian restaurant. Formal singing lessons soon followed, and he was seen performing at markets and charity balls. This album has been created under the expertise of music maestro Chong Lim, who has previously worked with John Farnham and Kylie Minogue.

== Reviews ==
Adam Greenberg of AllMusic gave the album 3 out of 5 saying; "Fresh off a win in 'Australia's Got Talent', 15-year-old Mark Vincent took his operatic skills to a full album. Beyond the gimmick of a young virtuoso, though, the surprising part here is that Vincent has serious vocal abilities. The opening "Nessun Dorma" is a somewhat clichéd choice for opera to deliver to a mass audience, but he performs it well. As he moves through the album, the mix becomes a little more hit or miss. Vincent specializes in straightforward, stereotypical operatic forms—long notes, grandiose deliveries. In some cases the delivery of simpler English lyrics proves a downfall." adding "the album as a whole shows some incredible promise."

== Track listing ==
Standard edition

1. "Nessun Dorma" – 3:11
2. "Time to Say Goodbye" – 4:05
3. "Hallelujah" – 3:20
4. "My Way" – 4:04
5. "You Raise Me Up" – 4:02
6. "Ave Maria" – 4:37
7. "This Is the Moment" – 3:15
8. "The Prayer" – 4:13
9. "No Matter What" – 4:35
10. "Unchained Melody" – 3:53

Platinum edition bonus tracks

11. "Memory" – 4:11
12. "The Impossible Dream" – 5:03
13. "Mama" – 3:20
14. "Lying in the Silence" – 4:14
15. "Grown Up Christmas List" – 4:44
16. "Advance Australia Fair" – 1:27

== Charts ==
My Dream – Mio Visione debuted at number 5 for the w/c 13 July 2009, before peaking at number 2 three weeks later.

=== Weekly charts ===
Chart (2009)	Peak position
Australian Albums (ARIA)	2
Australian Classical Album Chart	1

=== Year-end charts ===
Chart (2009)	Position
ARIA Albums Chart	22
ARIA Classical Albums Chart	1

Chart (2010)	Position
ARIA Classical Albums Chart	2

== Certifications ==
Region	Certification	Certified units/sales
Australia (ARIA)	Platinum	70,000^{^}
^{^} Shipments figures based on certification alone.

== Release history ==
Region	Date	Format	Edition(s)	Label	Catalogue
Australia	2 July 2009	CD; digital download	Standard	Sony Music Australia	88697552412
Australia	20 November 2009	CD; digital download	Platinum	Sony Music Australia	88697606332
