= Brian Stacey =

Australian conductor

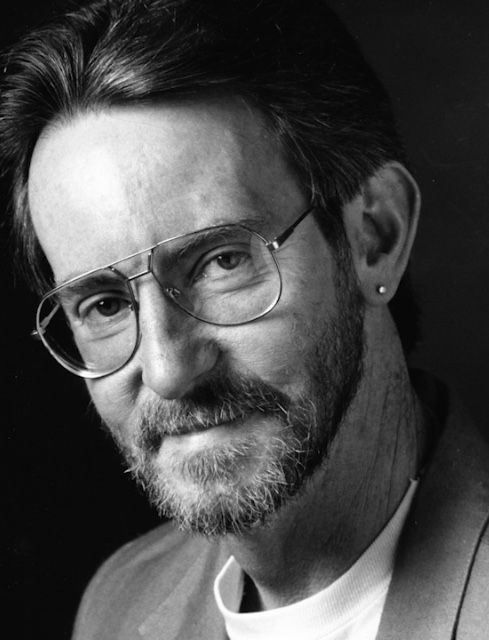
- Born: Brian James Stacey; 3 December 1946; Sydney, New South Wales, Australia
- Died: 25 October 1996 (aged 49); Melbourne, Victoria, Australia
- Resting place: Ashes spread on the river bank of Yarra River, Melbourne
- Occupations: Conductor, musical director
- Years active: 21
- Spouse: Monica Cunningham (divorced)
- Partner: Kathryn Sadler
- Children: 2
- Awards: The Age Performing Arts Award for Best Musical Director 1995
- Website: staceytrust.wordpress.com

Brian James Stacey (3 December 1946 – 25 October 1996) was an Australian conductor who started his career with the Queensland Ballet, the Australian Ballet, and Victoria State Opera, latterly becoming known for his work in Australian musical theatre (particularly with the Australian production of The Phantom of the Opera) but continuing his cross-genre career to the end of his life.

== Biography ==
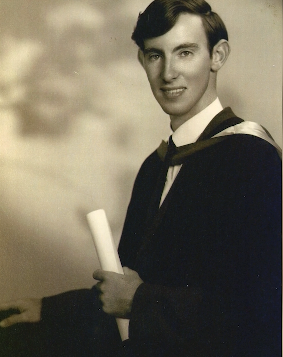
Graduation photo University of NSW 1967

Brian Stacey was born in Sydney, Australia. He entered the New South Wales Conservatorium of Music in 1964, graduating with a Bachelor of Music in 1967. In 1968 he married Monica Cunningham and had two daughters, Melinda Ann (1972) and Nicole Maree (1974). He was employed as director of music, Southern Cross University (formerly Northern Rivers College of Advanced Education, Lismore). He then studied for a master's degree in Music at the Queensland Conservatorium, studying with Australian composer Colin Brumby. In 1986 he began his relationship with Kathryn Sadler, with whom he would remain until his death.

His career highlights included: music director of the Australian Ballet, resident conductor for the Victoria State Opera, guest conductor with The Australian Opera, and regular appearances with the opera companies of South Australia, West Australia, and Auckland (New Zealand). Stacey was a protégé of the Australian conductor Sir Charles Mackerras, studying with and assisting him in the early 1980s, and in 1995 assisting him again on a production of Janáček's Káťa Kabanová with Opera Australia.

== Career ==
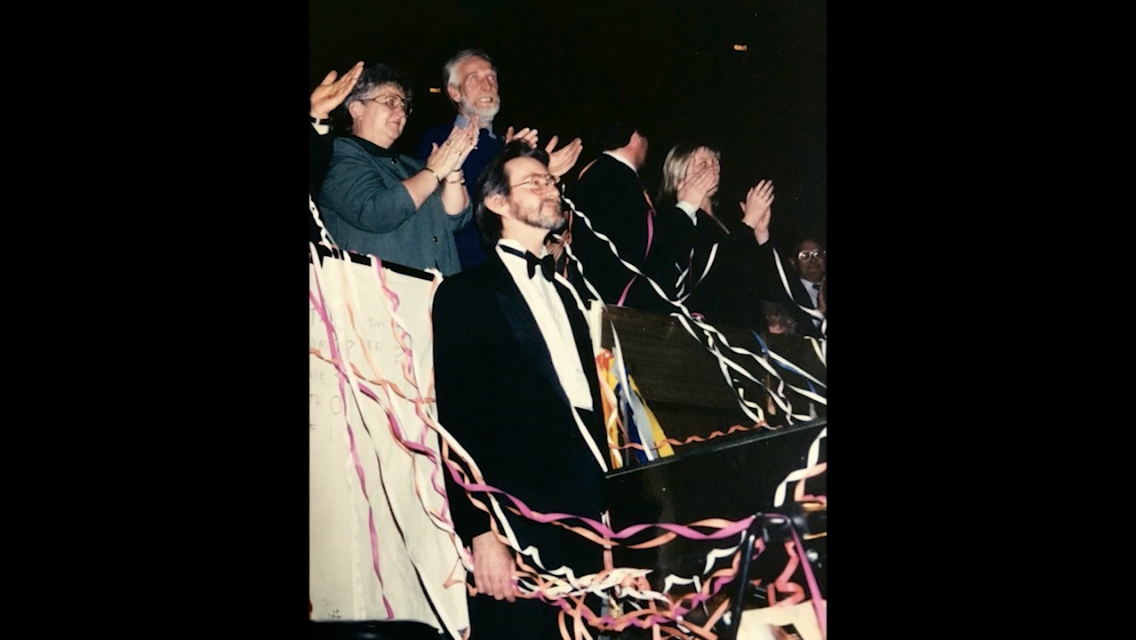
Post-performance photo

- 1975 Music director for Queensland Ballet, Queensland Theatre Company and Queensland Light Opera.
- 1980 Travelled to the United Kingdom to study with, and assist Sir Charles Mackerras
- 1983 On his return to Australia Stacey was employed as music director by The Australian Ballet.
- 1985 Appointed as resident conductor and head of music staff at Victoria State Opera
- 1986 Consultant to the Crown Prince of Tonga for the development of music in the Kingdom of Tonga
- Guest conductor, Mercury Theatre Opera Group, Auckland, New Zealand
- 1987 Guest conductor, State Opera of South Australia and The Australian Opera
- 1988 Guest conductor, Adelaide Symphony Orchestra
- 1989 Guest conductor, Queensland Symphony Orchestra, Melbourne Spoleto Festival
- 1990 Music director, Marina Prior's album Leading Lady and Anthony Warlow's album Centrestage
- 1990 Musical Director, The Phantom of the Opera, Original Australian production, Melbourne.
- 1992 Records An Evening of Classics with the State Orchestra of Victoria
- Music director, Marina Prior's album Aspects of Andrew Lloyd Webber
- Music director, Anthony Warlow's album On the Boards
- 1993 Music director, Into the Woods for Sydney Theatre Company
- Conducts Bizet's Carmen for Auckland Opera
- Music director, Follies in concert
- Guest conductor, My Fair Lady for Victoria State Opera
- 1994 conducts West Side Story for IMG / Victoria State Opera
- Conducts Kismet for Victoria State Opera
- Conducts A Dinner Engagement for Port Fairy Folk Festival, Victoria, Australia
- 1995 Assisting Sir Charles Mackerras on a production of Janáček's Káťa Kabanová with Opera Australia
- Conducts Candide for the Brisbane Biennial
- Conducts Ruddigore for Victoria State Opera
- Music director for The Secret Garden
- 1996 records CD Morning Melodies Volume 2 with State Orchestra of Victoria
- Conducts Die Fledermaus for West Australian Opera
- Conducts Aida for Victoria State Opera, music director of Sweeney Todd for Queensland Theatre Company, conducts concert of music by Kurt Weill for Melbourne Symphony, music director of Sunset Boulevard. Stacey died the day before the opening night of Sunset Boulevard

== Awards ==
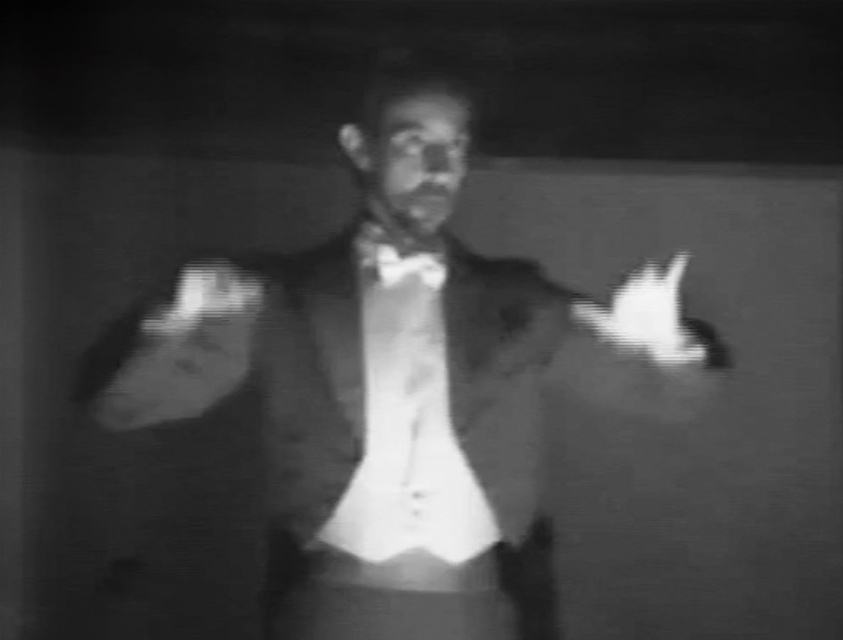
Brian Stacey on the podium

- Awarded The Age Performing Arts Award for Best Musical Director 1995

== Death ==
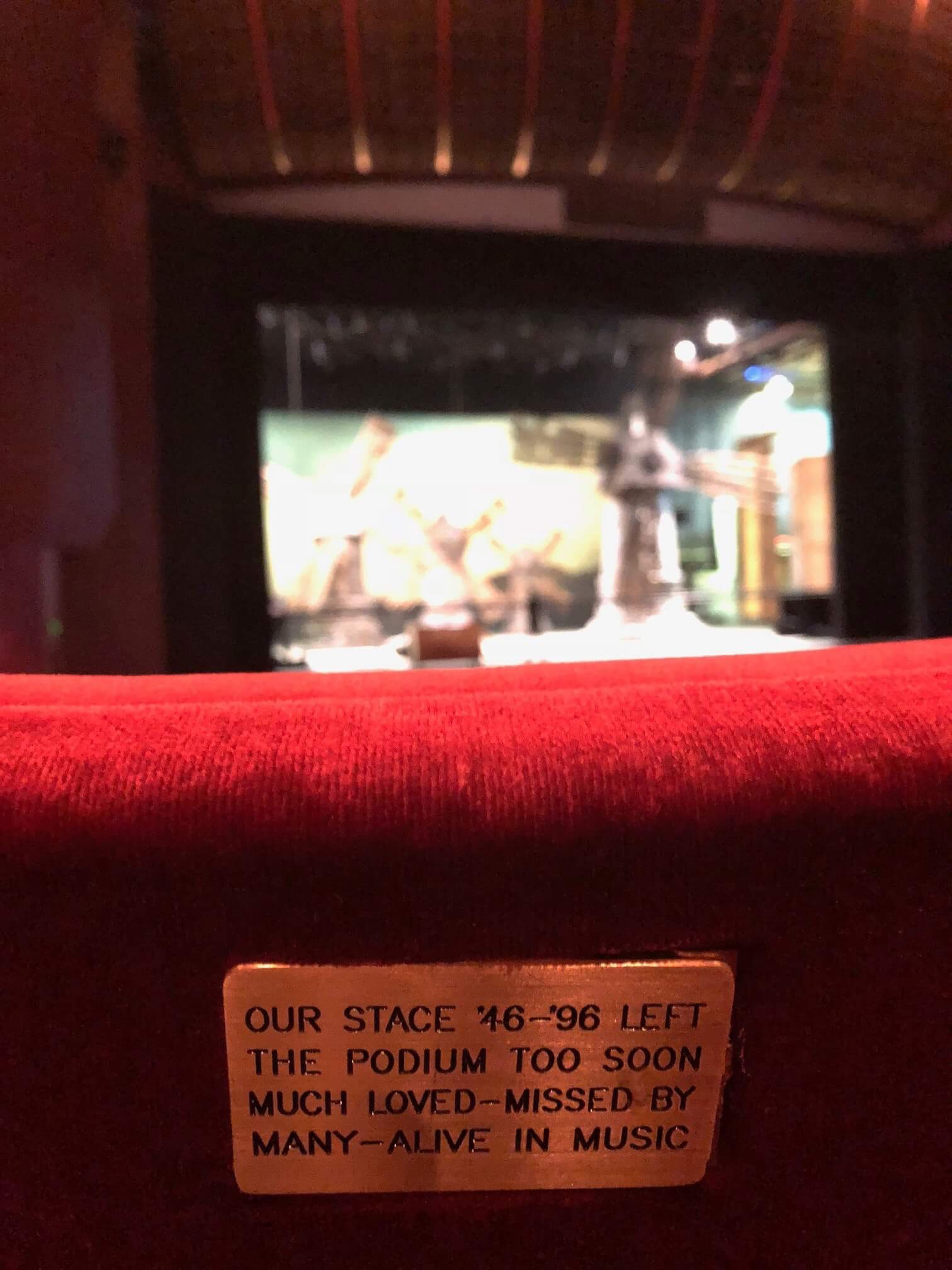
A photo of seat S10 at Melbourne's State Theatre dedicated to the memory of Brian Stacey

Brian Stacey died in Carlton, Melbourne, on 25 October 1996, the night before the premiere of Sunset Boulevard, due to a motorcycle accident. Stacey was survived by his partner Kathryn Sadler, and his daughters, Melinda and Nicole.

Andrew Lloyd Webber described Stacey's death as "a loss to the world of music theatre, not just Australia".

Stacey's ashes are spread on the banks of the Yarra River, Melbourne, Victoria. Seat S10 in the State Theatre, Arts Centre Melbourne, was dedicated to Brian's memory in 2008. A tribute film was made to celebrate his life and to mark the winding up of the Brian Stacey Memorial Trust in 2016. The film includes interviews with Sir Charles Mackerras, Guy Noble, Suzanne Johnston, Hugh Jackman, Marina Prior, Rhonda Burchmore, Sue Natrass and other Australian musicians.

== Brian Stacey Memorial Trust Award for emerging Australian conductors ==
The Brian Stacey Memorial Trust was launched at the Princess Theatre, Melbourne, in 1997 (on the first anniversary of his death). The Brian Stacey Memorial Trust Fund serves to commemorate Stacey's life and work and his contribution to musical life.

=== Patrons ===
- Sir Cameron Mackintosh
- Sir Charles Mackerras (until his death in 2010)

=== Trustees ===
- Kathryn Sadler (Chairman)
- Andrew Jenkins
- Melinda Stacey
- Sue Nattrass
- Stanton Sharman

=== Past trustee ===
- Stephen Dee (original Chair)
- Mietta O'Donnell (until her death in 2001)

=== Director ===
- Andrea Gaze

The Fund's purpose was to provide support to emerging conductors in Australia who wished to enhance their conducting skills, in particular by exploring performance genres outside their normal field of work. The final award of $10,000 from the Trust was awarded to Toby Thatcher to enable him to continue further study of the conducting profession and an opportunity to broaden his repertoire knowledge.

- 1998 Guy Noble
- 1999 Kynan Johns
- 2000 Max Xinyu-Liu
- 2001 Matthew Coorey
- 2002 Kellie Dickerson
- 2003 Benjamin Northey
- 2004 Simon Hewett
- 2005 Mark Shiell
- 2006 Ollivier Cuneo
- 2007 Dane Lam
- 2008 Paul Fitzsimon
- 2008 Vanessa Scammell
- 2009 Daniel Smith
- 2010 Burhan Güner
- 2011 Trevor Jones and James Pratt
- 2012 Daniel Carter
- 2013 Carolyn Watson
- 2014 Russell Ger
- 2015 Jessica Gethin
- 2016 Toby Thatcher

== Brian Stacey Memorial Trust Professional Development Awards for an emerging Australian conductor 2018 ==
In August 2018 the Brian Stacey Trust announced the 2018 Brian Stacey Professional Development Awards

- Christopher Dragon ($5,000)
- Natalia Raspopova ($2,500).
