= The Great Tenor Songbook =

Studio album by Mark Vincent
- Released: 19 November 2010
- Genre: Classical
- Length: 37:41
- Label: Sony Music Australia
- Producer: Chong Lim

Mark Vincent chronology
Compass (2010)	The Great Tenor Songbook (2010)	Songs from the Heart (2011)

The Great Tenor Songbook is the third studio album by Australian operatic pop singer Mark Vincent. The album was released through Sony Music Australia on 19 November 2010 and peaked at number 18 on the ARIA Charts. The album was certified gold.

== Track listing ==
1. "O sole mio" – 3:25
2. "Funiculi Funicula" – 2:50
3. "Caruso" – 5:25
4. "Santa Lucia" – 3:44
5. "Be My Love" – 3:33
6. "La donna è mobile" – 2:10
7. "If I Loved You" – 3:17
8. "Torna a Surriento" – 4:32
9. "Mattinata" – 2:46
10. "With a Song in My Heart" – 3:47
11. "Because" – 2:09
12. "O Holy Night" (with Kate Ceberano) – 4:54

== Charts ==
=== Weekly charts ===
Chart (2010)	Peak position
Australian Albums (ARIA)	18
Australian Classical Album Chart	1

=== Year-end charts ===
Chart (2010)	Position
ARIA Albums Chart	89
ARIA Classical Albums Chart	2

== Certifications ==
Region	Certification	Certified units/sales
Australia (ARIA)	Gold	35,000^{^}
^{^} Shipments figures based on certification alone.

== Release history ==
Region	Date	Format	Label	Catalogue
Australia	19 November 2010	CD; digital download	Sony Music Australia	88697760082
