= The Quartet Sessions =

Studio album by Mark Vincent
- Released: 18 October 2013
- Genre: Classical
- Length: 39:58
- Label: Sony Music Australia

Mark Vincent chronology
Songs from the Heart (2011)	The Quartet Sessions (2013)	Best So Far (2014)

The Quartet Sessions is the fifth studio album by Australian tenor, Mark Vincent. The album was released through Sony Music Australia on 18 October 2013 and peaked at number 16 on the ARIA Albums Chart.

This album features interpretations of classical and pop favourites from Beyoncé, Christina Perri, Coldplay and Green Day

Vincent said: "I've recorded four albums so far with big orchestras, I wanted to do something different for my next album and I wanted to surprise my audience. At first I thought that a quartet record would be crazy to do, but it works. It's incredibly hard to make a record like this. When you sing with a string quartet you need to sing to perfection. There is no room for mistakes." On the selection of songs, Vincent said; "I'm an artist that listens to all kinds of music: pop, rock, any genre. A lot of my friends aren't into classical music. I wanted to open up the classical music genre to more young people, so I recorded these songs in a classical way. If you listen to 'Burn For You', 'Halo' and 'Jar of Hearts'... no opera artist has recorded those kinds of songs before."

== Track listing ==
1. "Halo" – 4:23
2. "Runaway" (featuring Sally Cooper) – 3:52
3. "Bésame Mucho" – 3:53
4. "Suddenly" – 2:32
5. "Viva la Vida" – 4:10
6. "Jar of Hearts" – 4:26
7. "Maria" – 2:44
8. "Look Inside" – 3:38
9. "Burn For You" – 4:08
10. "Good Riddance (Time of Your Life)" – 2:35
11. "Book of Love" (featuring 2Cellos) – 3:27

== Charts ==
=== Weekly charts ===
Chart (2013)	Peak position
Australian Albums (ARIA)	16
Australian Classical Albums Chart	1

=== Year-end charts ===
Chart (2013)	Position
ARIA Classical Albums Chart	7

== Release history ==
Region	Date	Format	Label	Catalogue
Australia	18 October 2013	CD; digital download	Sony Music Australia	88765477702
