= Together (Marina Prior and Mark Vincent album) =

Studio album by Marina Prior and Mark Vincent
- Released: 15 April 2016
- Genre: Classical crossover; show tune; bossa nova
- Length: 47:31
- Label: Sony Music Australia
- Producer: Chong Lim

Marina Prior chronology
Leading Lady: The Ultimate Collection (2015)	Together (2016)

Mark Vincent chronology
Best So Far (2014)	Together (2016)	A Tribute to Mario Lanza (2017)

Together is a collaborative studio album by Australian singer Marina Prior and Mark Vincent. The album was released through Sony Music Australia on 15 April 2016 and peaked at number 5 on the ARIA Albums Chart three weeks later.

The two are set to tour in support of the album from September to November 2016 with the Two Heavenly Voices – One Magical Evening tour. The tour was announced in March 2016.

== Background and release ==
Upon release, Mark said; "I was so excited to work with Marina, I've always wanted to work with her... singing together created such a great bond between us and we've become great friends. I think that shows in the songs we sing on Together...there's an honesty between us." Marina added; "You have to be on the same wavelength, you have to be 'simpatico' and feel things together. I think that we do that musically, but I also think that we click personally. Music is just an extension of who you are, really. The work has to be true for it to resonate."

The duo performed "The Prayer" live on Sunrise on 3 May.

== Track listing ==
1. "The Prayer" – 5:28
2. "Time to Say Goodbye" – 4:08
3. "Quizás, Quizás, Quizás" – 3:06
4. "Libiamo ne' lieti calici" – 4:15
5. "The Music of the Night" – 2:54
6. "I Hate You Then I Love You" – 4:43
7. "All I Ask of You" – 3:20
8. "Amigos Para Siempre" – 3:55
9. "Somos Novios" – 4:17
10. "E Più Ti Penso" – 4:33
11. "I Vow to Thee, My Country" – 4:26
12. "La Vie en rose" – 2:26

== Charts ==
=== Weekly charts ===
Chart (2016)	Peak position
Australian Albums (ARIA)	5
Australian Classical Albums (ARIA)	1

=== Year-end charts ===
Chart (2016)	Position
Australian Albums (ARIA)	81

== Release history ==
Region	Date	Format	Label	Catalogue
Australia	15 April 2016	CD; digital download	Sony Music Australia	88985314732
