= Guy Noble =

Australian conductor, composer, broadcaster

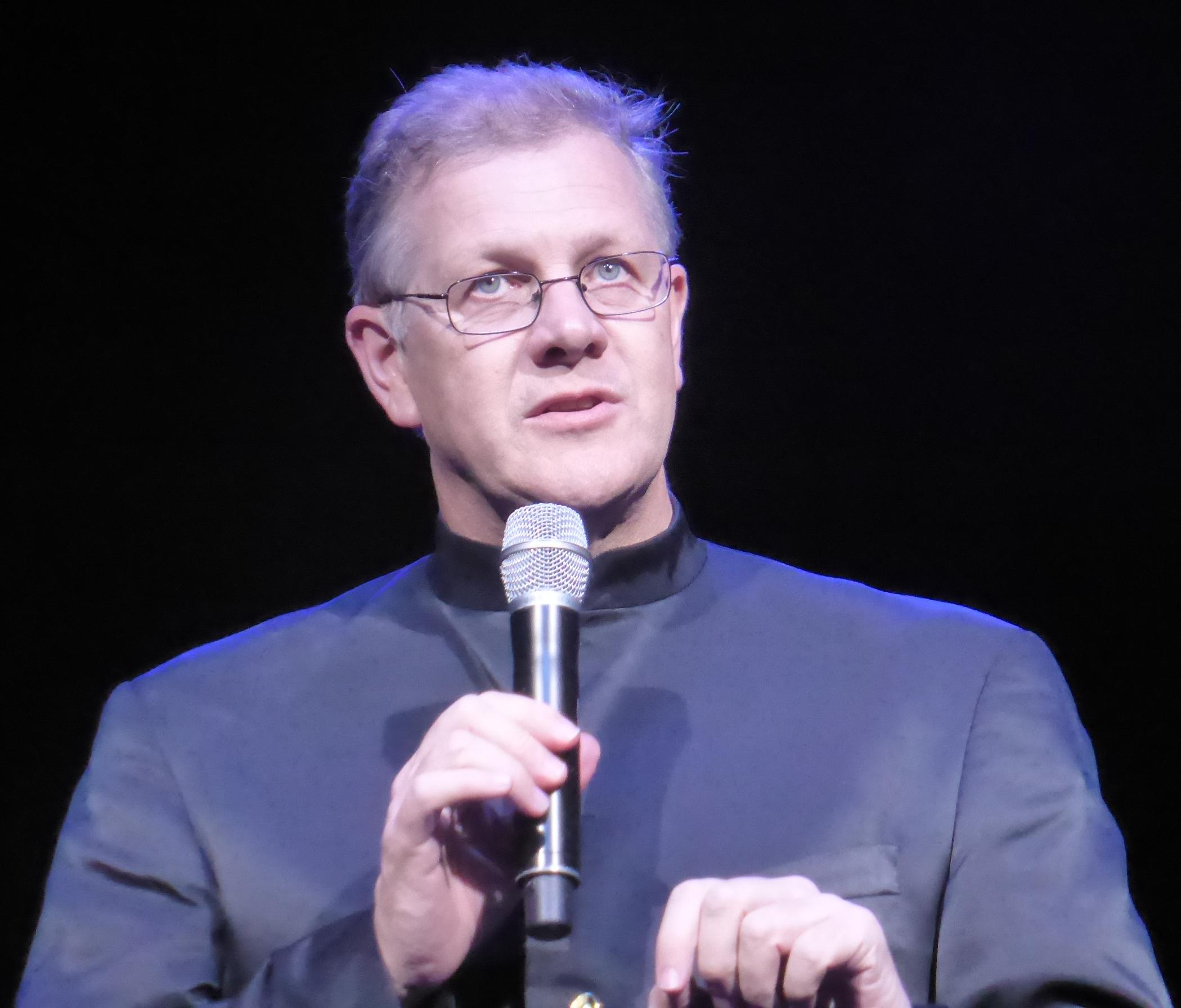
Noble in 2016

Guy Noble is an Australian musical composer, conductor, pianist and broadcaster.

Noble studied piano in the early 1980s at the Sydney Conservatorium. On a scholarship from the Australia Council he travelled to London where he worked for four years, including a stint as presenter on BBC Radio 3. In 1984, he was pianist in the Sydney Youth Orchestra and from 1984 to 1986 in the Australian Youth Orchestra. Noble was the inaugural recipient of the Brian Stacey Memorial Trust Award for emerging Australian conductors in 1998; the trust, in collaboration with the Australian Broadcasting Corporation, financed the composition and recording of Noble's Flute Concerto, written for Jane Rutter.

In 2022 he was appointed as the conductor and host of the Queensland Symphony Orchestra.

Prior to that he conducted the Sydney, Melbourne, Adelaide, West Australian, Tasmanian, Queensland and Canberra symphony orchestras, the Auckland Philharmonia, and the Hong Kong Philharmonic and Malaysian Philharmonic orchestras.

Noble has also conducted and presented concerts with performers including The Beach Boys, Yvonne Kenny, David Hobson, Ben Folds, Dianne Reeves, Randy Newman, Teddy Tahu Rhodes and Clive James.

He is the former host of the ABC Classic FM radio breakfast program.

He writes a regular column in Limelight magazine.
