= A Tribute to Mario Lanza =

Studio album by Mark Vincent
- Released: 14 April 2017
- Genre: Classical
- Label: Sony Music Australia

Mark Vincent chronology
Together (2016)	A Tribute to Mario Lanza (2017)	The Most Wonderful Time of the Year (2018)

A Tribute to Mario Lanza is the seventh studio album by Australian tenor, Mark Vincent. The album was released through Sony Music Australia on 14 April 2017.

== Track listing ==
CD/DVD

1. "Because You're Mine" (with Mario Lanza) – 3:25
2. "Come Prima" – 3:39
3. "Nessun Dorma" – 3:30
4. "Be My Love" – 2:49
5. "The Donkey Serenade" – 3:05
6. "The Loveliest Night of the Year" – 3:10
7. "E lucevan le stelle" – 2:49
8. "'O sole mio" – 2:52
9. "Arrivederci Roma" – 3:59
10. "Mamma Mia, Che Vo' Sape?" – 2:23
11. "Without a Song" – 3:41
12. "I'll Walk with God" – 2:37

== Charts ==
=== Weekly charts ===
Chart (2017)	Peak position
Australian Albums (ARIA)	3

=== Year-end charts ===
Chart (2017)	Position
Australian Albums (ARIA)	61

== Release history ==
Region	Date	Format	Label	Catalogue
Australia	14 April 2017	CD; digital download	Sony Music Australia	88985431722
