= Songs from the Heart (Mark Vincent album) =

Studio album by Mark Vincent
- Released: 14 October 2011
- Genre: Classical
- Length: 51:16
- Label: Sony Music Australia

Mark Vincent chronology
The Great Tenor Songbook (2010)	Songs from the Heart (2011)	The Quartet Sessions (2013)

Songs from the Heart is the fourth studio album by Australian tenor, Mark Vincent. The album was released through Sony Music Australia on 14 October 2011 and peaked at number 10 on the ARIA Charts.

Songs from the Heart is a special selection of songs dedicated to commemorate the 20th anniversary of the death of Dr. Victor Chang.

== Reviews ==
Jon O'Brien from AllMusic gave the album 3 out of 5 saying; "Alongside the usual film themes, traditional standards and timeless pop hits, Vincent has chosen a slightly less predictable array of songs, at least proving to his naysayers that there is some sign of progression" concluding with "While British counterpart Paul Potts appears to have been all but forgotten, Songs from the Heart suggests that Mark Vincent has the guile to extend his reality TV-assisted fame once he's outside his teens."

== Track listing ==
1. "You're Still You" – 3:41
2. "Amazing Grace" – 3:58
3. "Non ti scordar di me" – 3:07
4. "'Til I Hear You Sing" – 3:20
5. "Young at Heart" – 2:48
6. "Wishing You Were Somehow Here Again" – 3:48
7. "Climb Every Mountain" – 2:36
8. "Cavatina" – 3:54
9. "If Ever I Would Leave You" – 3:53
10. "Bridge over Troubled Water" – 3:59
11. "Mi Manchi" – 3:37
12. "Forever and Ever" – 3:47
13. "Once Before I Go On" – 4:22
14. "My Heart Will Go On" – 4:26

== Charts ==
=== Weekly charts ===
Chart (2011)	Peak position
Australian Albums (ARIA)	10
Australian Classical Albums Chart	1

=== Year-end charts ===
Chart (2011)	Position
ARIA Artist Albums Chart	22
ARIA Classical Albums Chart	2

== Release history ==
Region	Date	Format	Label	Catalogue
Australia	14 October 2011	CD; digital download	Sony Music Australia	88697927992
