= Jessica Gethin =

Australian conductor and violinist

- Origin: Perth, Western Australia
- Occupation: Conductor
- Instrument: Violin

Jessica Gethin is an orchestral conductor from Western Australia. Gethin is internationally recognised for her dynamic conducting style and has engaged with symphonic ensembles across Australia, New Zealand, Asia and the United States. Her expertise as a conductor encompasses symphonic works, opera, ballet, contemporary music, film scores, to pop recordings.

== Career ==
She earned her Bachelor of Music Performance from the Western Australian Academy of Performing Arts in 2002 and was selected for the prestigious Symphony Australia Conductor Development Program.

In the early 2000s Gethin met Bourby Webster, a viola player who shared her vision of transforming how orchestral music was presented to audiences and making classical music more accessible which led to the founding of the Perth Symphony Orchestra.

Gethin was Chief Conductor of the Perth Symphony Orchestra from 2011 to 2019 and appointed Co-Artistic Director of the Perth Chamber Orchestra in 2015. That year proved to be a milestone in her career, as she was also awarded the Brian Stacey Award for an Emerging Australian Conductor and the Australian Financial Review recognised her as one of Australia's "Top 100 Women of Influence".

In 2016, Gethin received the Churchill Fellowship, allowing her to pursue study and mentorship opportunities outside of Australia. This endeavour led to her becoming an inaugural Fellow at the Hart Institute of Women Conductors with the Dallas Opera, where she has been mentored by Emmanuel Villaume, Nicole Paiement and Christopher Seaman.

More recently, Gethin was appointed Principal Conductor for the West Australian Ballet and has been involved in teaching and lecturing at Australian music institutions, including as Head of Orchestral Studies and Conducting at the Western Australian Academy of Performing Arts in 2023.

As of 2024, Gethin has taken on the role of Artistic Advisor for Orchestra Victoria and continues to serve as an ambassador for the Perth Symphony Orchestra's Women on the Podium program, advocating for gender equity in the conducting field.

== Personal life ==
Gethin's was born into a musical family. Her father Ray Walker, an Irish-born musician and former lecturer in jazz guitar, and her mother, Teresa, a choral singer, were her first musical role models. Gethin's musical talent was evident early on and she was the recipient of a scholarship to St Mary’s Anglican Girls’ School in Karrinyup, Western Australia. After graduating she became an instrumental string teacher for the school.

Gethin is married with two children in Perth, Western Australia.

== Awards ==
- 2002 - Faithe Court Scholarship Prize for Performance at WAAPA
- 2015 - Brian Stacey Memorial Trust Award for emerging Australian conductors
- 2015 - Fellow of the Dallas Opera’s Hart Institute for Women Conductors
- 2016 - The Mr and Mrs Gerald Frank NewChurchill Fellowship
- 2019 - Finalist for West Australian of the Year (Arts and Culture)
- 2024 - Inducted into the Western Australia Women Hall of Fame

=== Australian Women in Music Awards ===
The Australian Women in Music Awards is an annual event that celebrates outstanding women in the Australian Music Industry who have made significant and lasting contributions in their chosen field. They commenced in 2018.

Year	Nominee / work	Award	Result
2026	Jessica Gethin	Excellence in Classical Music Award	Nominated
