= Toby Thatcher =

Australian-British conductor (born 1989)

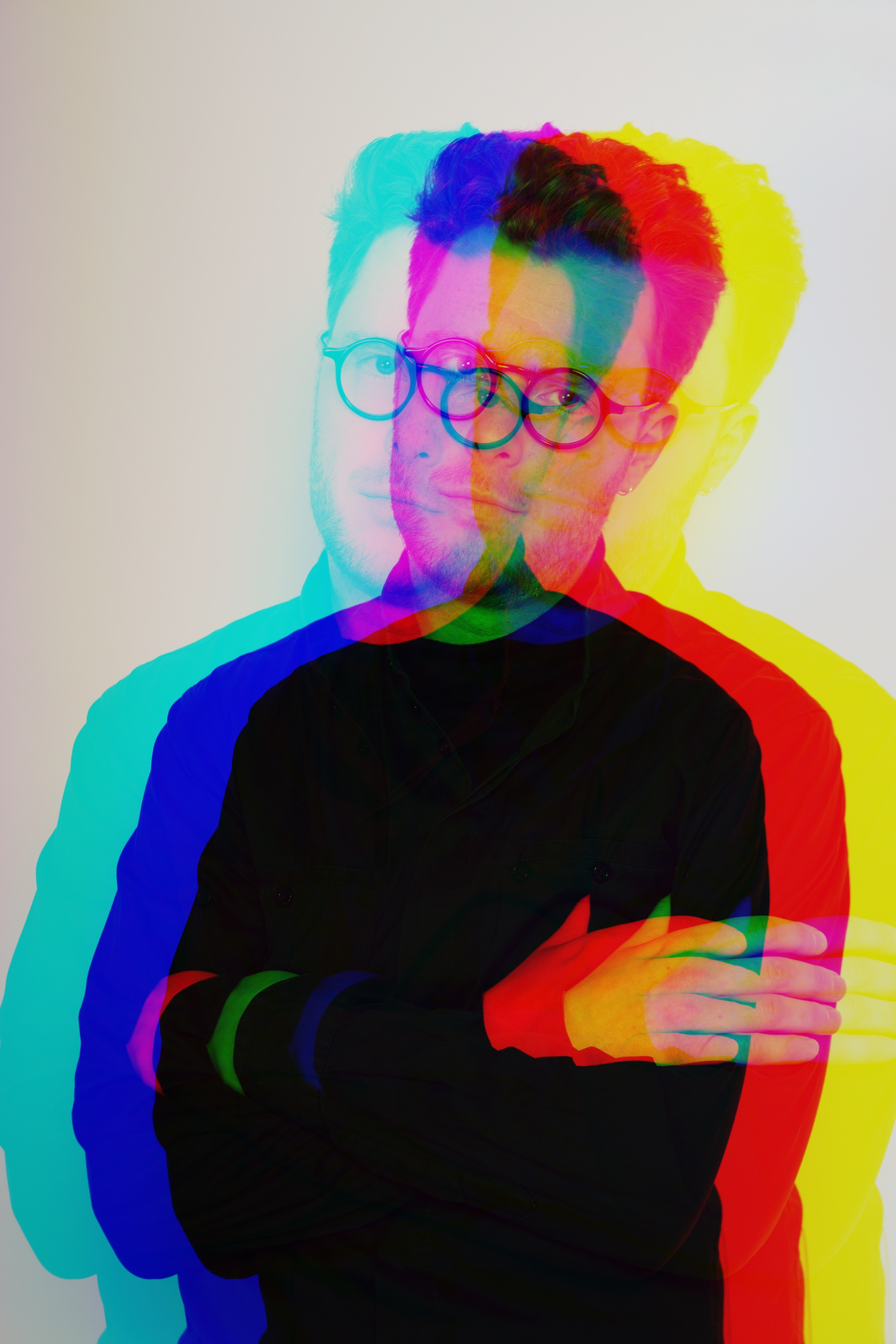

Toby C Thatcher (born 28 January 1989) is an Australian-British conductor.

Thatcher is artistic director of the Nineteenth Circle, a group of 19th Century-specialist performers committed to diversifying the voice within classical music programming, and representing a fuller spectrum of coetaneous human experience in order to enhance the canon", and Founder & Director of Zeitgeist, an online multimedia gallery & commissioner of contemporary work.

He is Assistant Conductor to the Orchestre national d'Île-de-France.

Thatcher has worked with ensembles internationally including Orchestre National de France, Ensemble Intercontemporain, Ensemble Modern, Slovenian Philharmonic Orchestra, Sydney Symphony Orchestra, Sinfonieorchester Basel, Pannon Philharmonic, Auckland Philharmonia Orchestra, Queensland Symphony Orchestra & Tasmanian Symphony Orchestra.

He has held positions as Assistant Conductor of the Sydney Symphony Orchestra & Orchestre National de France, and Guest Assistant Conductor to the London Philharmonic Orchestra.

He has been a prize-winner & finalist at five international competitions, including the Sir Georg Solti International Conductors' Competition (see Georg Solti) for conducting Strauss's Don Juan and Dvořák's Carnival Overture with the hr-Sinfonieorchester and Frankfurter Opern- und Museumsorchester, the Princess Astrid Competition with the Trondheim Symfoniorkester, and the International Competition of Young Conductors Lovro von Matačić with the Croatian Radio Orchestra. In August 2015, Thatcher was joint winner of the inaugural Neeme Järvi Prize at the Menuhin Festival.

Thatcher holds several awards in his birth country, including the Brian Stacey Award for Young Australian Conductors, and the 2016 Award for Outstanding Achievement from the University of Sydney.

In 2014, Thatcher graduated from the Royal Academy of Music with an MA, where he studied as an oboist. During his studies, Thatcher played with orchestras such as the Philharmonia Orchestra, the Royal Philharmonic Orchestra, the London Sinfonietta, the Australian Youth Orchestra and The Sydney Youth Orchestra.
