= The Most Wonderful Time of the Year (Mark Vincent album) =

Studio album by Mark Vincent
- Released: 26 October 2018
- Genre: Christmas
- Label: Sony Music Australia

Mark Vincent chronology
A Tribute to Mario Lanza (2017)	The Most Wonderful Time of the Year (2018)

The Most Wonderful Time of the Year is the eighth studio and first Christmas album by Australian tenor, Mark Vincent. The album was released through Sony Music Australia on 26 October 2018.

Upon announcement Vincent said: "I have long dreamed of recording a Christmas album that captures the beautiful traditions of the festive season. Over the years these songs have brought so much joy to my family and I, and it is my pleasure to give back that same joy by making this album; it was my time to record a Christmas album, as Christmas is the most beautiful day of the year."

Vincent will be performing two special shows in support; at The Palms at Crown in Melbourne on 14 December and at the Sutherland Entertainment Centre in Sydney on 23 December.

== Track listing ==
1. "It's the Most Wonderful Time of the Year" – 3:12
2. "Hark! The Herald Angels Sing" – 3:35
3. "White Christmas" – 3:10
4. "The Holy City" – 4:14
5. "Angels We Have Heard on High" (with Marina Prior) – 3:17
6. "Have Yourself a Merry Little Christmas" – 3:33
7. "Deck the Halls (Nos Galan)" – 1:59
8. "Adeste Fideles (O Come, All Ye Faithful)" – 3:36
9. "The First Noel" – 4:06
10. "The Little Drummer Boy" (with Russell Watson) – 4:26
11. "O Holy Night (Cantique de Noël)" – 4:48
12. "Silent Night" – 4:34

== Charts ==
Chart (2018)	Peak position
Australian Albums (ARIA)	16

== Release history ==
Region	Date	Format	Label	Catalogue
Australia	26 October 2018	CD; digital download	Sony Music Australia	19075898612
