= Aspects of Andrew Lloyd Webber =

Studio album by Marina Prior
- Released: November 1992
- Genre: Musical theatre, show tune
- Label: Sony Music Australia

Marina Prior chronology
Leading Lady (1991)	Aspects of Andrew Lloyd Webber (1992)	Somewhere – The Songs of Sondheim and Bernstein (1994)

Aspects of Andrew Lloyd Webber is the second studio album by Australian singer Marina Prior featuring Melbourne Symphony Orchestra conducted by Brian Stacey. It was released in November 1992 and peaked at number 22 on the ARIA Albums Chart. The album was certified gold for shipment of 35000 copies.

The album is a tribute to the work of Andrew Lloyd Webber. Prior had starred as Christine Daaé in the original Australian production of Lloyd Webber's The Phantom of the Opera, and had earlier appeared in the original Australian production of Cats.

At the ARIA Music Awards of 1993, the album was nominated for Best Adult Contemporary Album but lost to Don't Hold Back That Feeling by Andrew Pendlebury.

== Track listing ==
CD/ Cassette

1. "I Don't Know How to Love Him" - from Jesus Christ Superstar
2. "Half a Moment" - from By Jeeves
3. "Seeing is Believing" - from Aspects of Love
4. "Memory" - from Cats
5. "Close Every Door" - from Joseph and the Amazing Technicolor Dreamcoat
6. "Music of the Night" - from The Phantom of the Opera
7. "Nothing Like You've Ever Known" - from Song and Dance
8. "Amigos Para Siempre" - from 1992 Summer Olympics
9. "Buenos Aires" - from Evita
10. "Another Suitcase in Another Hall" - from Evita
11. "Don't Cry for Me Argentina" - from Evita
12. "Hosanna" - from Requiem
13. "Pie Jesu" - from Requiem
14. "Unexpected Song" - from Song and Dance

== Charts and certifications ==
=== Weekly charts ===
Chart (1992/93)	Peak position
Australian Albums (ARIA)	22

=== Certifications ===
Region	Certification	Certified units/sales
Australia (ARIA)	Gold	35,000^{^}
^{^} Shipments figures based on certification alone.

== Release history ==
Region	Date	Format	Label	Catalogue
Australia	November 1992	CD / Cassette	Sony Music Australia	472653.2
