= Leading Ladies =

Leading Ladies may refer to:

- Leading Ladies (film), a 2010 dance film
- Leading Ladies (play), a theatrical comedy play by Ken Ludwig
- Leading Ladies (group), a musical supergroup
- Leading Ladies (podcast), a Zambian podcast on historical women

== See also ==
- Leading Lady (disambiguation)
