= Jill Martin =

English musical theatre actress

- Born: 25 April 1938; Redruth, Cornwall, England
- Died: 24 December 2016 (aged 78); England
- Occupation: actress
- Years active: 1950–2005

Jill Martin (25 April 1938 – 24 December 2016) was an English actress and singer who made her career in West End theatre from the 1950 to the 2000s. Born in Redruth, Cornwall, she was educated at The Lawn School at St Austell and a song teacher at the school believed her to have an opera singer's voice. Martin debuted in the theatre in 1950 and was an understudy to several actresses. She was the only actor to appear in all three runs of My Fair Lady and produced a studio cast recording in 1966. Other musicals that Martin portrayed characters in were Fiddler on the Roof, Side by Side by Sondheim, The Baker's Wife, Les Misérables and Allegro.

== Biography ==
Jill Martin was born in Redruth, Cornwall, on 25 April 1938. When she was six, her father was killed in Second World War action and she found consolation in songs from musicals and danced on the window ledge in her mother's public house. Martin was educated at The Lawn School at St Austell. While Martin's song teacher believed that her student had the voice of an opera singer, she was impatient and she perceived opera as a more competitive industry than musicals.

Martin debuted in the theatre in 1950 with the chorus of Love from Judy at the Golders Green Hippodrome. She toured with the musical for the next two years and then appeared opposite George Formby in Dick Whittington at the Palace Theatre, London for one season. Afterwards, Martin had a lengthy spell of unemployment from theatre and she took up employment as a cleaner at a women's theatre club for three months. She was scouted by the theatre manager Binkie Beaumont, who cast her as a chorus girl and understudy for the musical Where's Charley? in 1958. That year, Martin was cast as second understudy to Julie Andrews who was playing Eliza Doolittle in My Fair Lady at the Theatre Royal, Drury Lane, and later appeared in the role of Rosalia in the West End musical of West Side Story at Her Majesty's Theatre. She later understudied for Roberta D'Esti as Maria.

On one occasion, Martin's grandmother and mother read an issue of the newspaper The Stage and decided that Martin should attend an open audition for the junior lead in Joie de Vivre. She won the part through being acquainted with the director William Chappell, and was escorted to the Theatre Girls' Club in Soho, where young actress were tended to and she took lessons in drawing, sewing, singing and gymnastics. The performance closed after four performances due to poor press reviews and commercial success. Martin remained in Soho and practised in the Theatre Girls' Club on an out-of-tune piano and a worn ballet barre. In 1966, she produced a studio cast recording alongside the actor David Holliday for the Music for Pleasure record label.

At the end of the 1960s Martin joined the casat of Fiddler on the Roof at Her Majesty's Theatre, playing Hodel, before returning to the West End to appear in Tom Brown's School Days at the Cambridge Theatre in 1972 and then Cockie! at the Vaudeville Theatre in 1973. She had a further role in Side by Side by Sondheim at the Garrick Theatre in 1978. The following year, she took over the lead role of Eliza Doolittle from Liz Robertson in a revival of My Fair Lady. Martin was part in the original cast of Les Misérables at the Barbican Centre in 1985. She also appeared in Follies at the Shaftesbury Theatre two years later, as well as The Baker's Wife at the Phoenix Theatre in 1989.

Roles in the 1990s and the 2000s included Allegro (1993), Floyd Collins (1999) and Lautrec (2000). Martin understudied the role of Norma Desmond in Sunset Boulevard at its final year at the Adelphi Theatre in 1997. In 2001, she played Mrs Eynsford-Hill in another revival of My Fair Lady, becoming the only actor to appear in all three runs of the musical in the West End. Martin took two minor roles in Acorn Antiques: The Musical! at the Theatre Royal in 2005 and was one of six actresses to be part of a rendition of the song "Wouldn't It Be Loverly" at a plaque unveiling ceremony for lyricist Alan Jay Lerner the next year. She died of cancer on 24 December 2016.

== Personality and personal life ==
Martin's obituarist in The Times called her "Something of a traditionalist" and a person who "cut a dash of Audrey Hepburn". She upheld many superstitions in the theatre world and insisted on receiving a bouquet of flowers before performances. Martin was twice married: firstly to the theatre production manager Thomas Elliott with whom she had two children, and latterly to John Morgan.
