= Compass (Mark Vincent album) =

Studio album by Mark Vincent
- Released: 16 April 2010
- Genre: Classical
- Length: 44:26
- Label: Sony Music Australia
- Producer: Chong Lim

Mark Vincent chronology
My Dream – Mio Visione (2009)	Compass (2010)	The Great Tenor Songbook (2010)

Compass is the second studio album by Australian tenor, Mark Vincent. The album was released through Sony Music Australia on 15 April 2010 and peaked at number 2 on the ARIA Charts. The album was certified gold.

The album includes the title track "Compass" which was written by Dianne Warren especially for Mark.

== Reviews ==
Jon O'Brien of AllMusic gave the album 3 1/2 out of 5 saying; "Backed by simple but tasteful orchestral arrangements, Vincent appears just as much at ease when tackling traditional operatic pieces, such as Agustin Lara's 1932 Latin classic "Granada," as he does when adding an operatic flavor to modern pop classics like Roy Orbison's "Crying," Rod Stewart's "Sailing," and musical favorites like West Side Story's "Somewhere" and Carousel's "You'll Never Walk Alone." An emotionally stirring duet with classically trained soprano Greta Bradman on a cover of musical hero Andrea Bocelli's "I Believe" provides the highlight, but Vincent's first original composition, the powerfully dramatic title track, specially penned for him by prolific Grammy Award-winner Diane Warren, suggests he could give Josh Groban a run for his money if he ever dared to venture away from the often predictable classical crossover fare. Compass isn't quite the leap forward Vincent needed if he's to transcend his talent show beginnings, but it's an accomplished effort which indicates he's capable of producing more original and inventive material in the future."

== Track listing ==
1. "Granada" – 4:28
2. "The Music of the Night" – 5:28
3. "Nella Fantasia" – 4:32
4. "I Believe" (featuring Greta Bradman) – 4:24
5. "Somewhere" – 3:31
6. "Crying" – 3:55
7. "Amapola" – 3:48
8. "Compass" – 4:06
9. "Who Can I Turn To" – 2:39
10. "Sailing" – 4:16
11. "You'll Never Walk Alone" – 2:49

== Charts ==
=== Weekly charts ===
Chart (2010)	Peak position
Australian Albums (ARIA)	5
Australian Classical Albums Chart	1

=== Year-end charts ===
Chart (2010)	Position
ARIA Albums Chart	74
ARIA Classical Albums Chart	1

== Certifications ==
Region	Certification	Certified units/sales
Australia (ARIA)	Gold	35,000^{^}
^{^} Shipments figures based on certification alone.

== Release history ==
Region	Date	Format	Label	Catalogue
Australia	16 April 2010	CD; digital download	Sony Music Australia	88697672062
