= Somewhere – The Songs of Sondheim and Bernstein =

Studio album by Marina Prior
- Released: November 1994
- Genre: Musical theatre, show tune
- Length: 53:53
- Label: Sony Music Australia

Marina Prior chronology
Aspects of Andrew Lloyd Webber (1992)	Somewhere – The Songs of Sondheim and Bernstein (1994)	All I Ask of You (2006)

Somewhere – The Songs of Sondheim and Bernstein is the third studio album by Australian singer Marina Prior featuring Melbourne Symphony Orchestra. The album is a tribute to the work of Stephen Sondheim and Leonard Bernstein.

In 1994, Prior starred as Maria in an Australian production of the musical West Side Story and won an Australian Variety Artists Mo Awards (MO) Award for 'Best Female Music Theatre Performer' for this role. The songs "Tonight" and "One Hand, One Heart" are duets with American actor Sean McDermott, who played Tony in the production of West Side Story. "A Boy Like That"/"I Have a Love" is a duet with Caroline O'Connor, who played Anita.

== Track listing ==
CD/ Cassette

1. "Somewhere" - from West Side Story - 2:36
2. "Send in the Clowns" - from A Little Night Music - 3:00
3. "Sooner or Later" - from Dick Tracy - 4:15
4. "Tonight" - from West Side Story - 5:30
5. "One Hand, One Heart" - from West Side Story - 4:30
6. "A Boy Like That" / "I Have a Love" - from West Side Story -5:32
7. "Not While I'm Around - from Sweeney Todd - 3:54
8. "You Could Drive a Person Crazy" - from Company - 2:45
9. "I Can Cook Too" - from On The Town - 3:20
10. "The Boy From..." - from The Mad Show - 3:17
11. "What Can You Lose" - from Dick Tracy - 2:28
12. "Green Finch and Linnet Bird" - from Sweeney Todd: The Demon Barber of Fleet Street - 3:23
13. "Glitter and Be Gay" - from Candide - 5:38
14. "Move On" - from Sunday In The Park With George - 3:45

== Charts ==
Chart (1994)	Peak position
Australian Albums (ARIA)	75

== Release history ==
Region	Date	Format	Label	Catalogue
Australia	November 1994	CD / Cassette	Sony Music Australia	478068 2
