= Mark Vincent =

Australian tenor (born 1993)

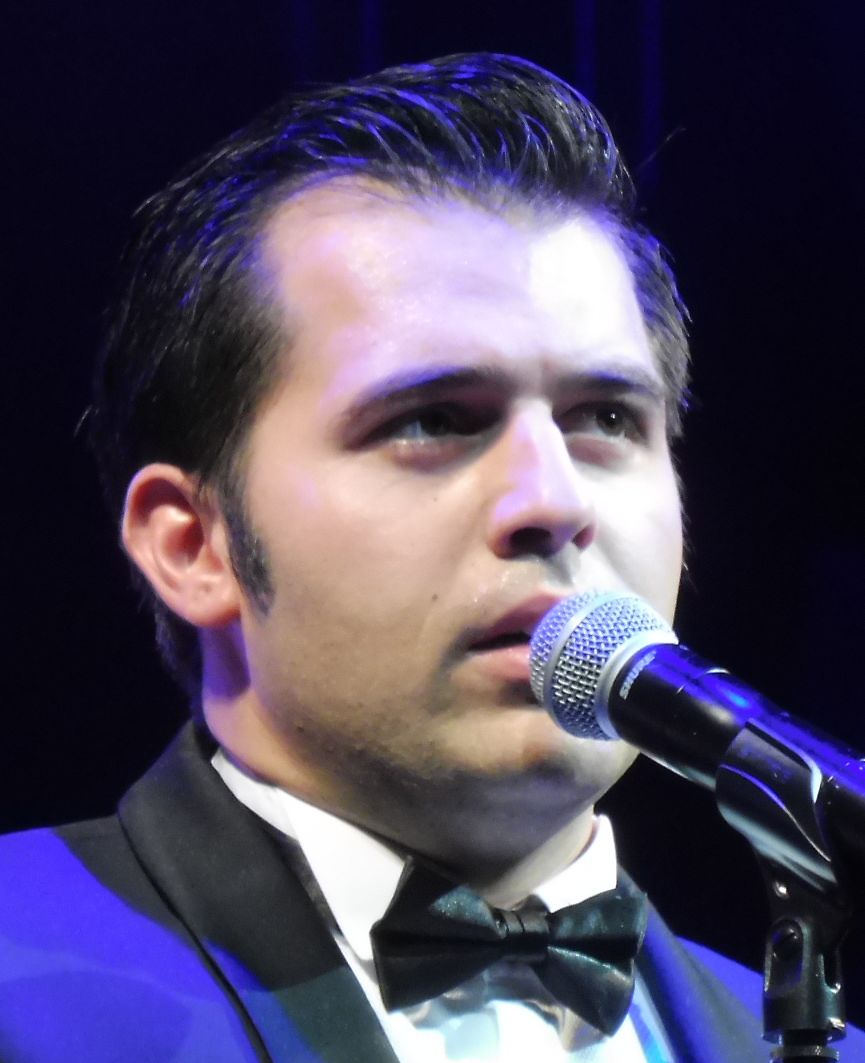
- Vincent performing in 2018

Background information
- Born: 4 September 1993 (age 32); Caringbah, New South Wales, Australia
- Genres: Operatic pop
- Occupation: Singer
- Years active: 2007–present
- Website: markvincent.com.au

Mark Vincent (born 4 September 1993) is an Australian tenor of operatic pop. Vincent won the third season of Australia's Got Talent in 2009 and immediately signed with Sony Music Australia. As of 2018, Vincent has released seven studio albums and one "best of".

== Early life ==
Vincent was born in Caringbah, New South Wales.

== Career ==
In February 2009, Vincent appeared on the third season of Australia's Got Talent singing "Nessun dorma". On 22 April 2009, Vincent was declared the winner and immediately signed with Sony Music Australia. Vincent released his debut studio album, My Dream – Mio Visione in July 2009. The album peaked at number 2 on the ARIA Charts and was certified platinum. In 2010, Vincent released Compass which peaked at number 5 and The Great Tenor Songbook which peaked at number 18.

In 2011, Vincent released his fourth album, Songs from the Heart which peaked at number 10. In 2013, Vincent released The Quartet Sessions, followed by Best So Far in April 2014. In 2014, Vincent made his music theatre debut in the highly acclaimed Australian production of Dirty Dancing, which played 130 shows around the country.

Vincent's sixth studio album was a collaborative released with Marina Prior in 2016. The album debuted at number 5. Vincent and Prior toured the album. Vincent performed at Carols in the Domain in Sydney for the eighth consecutive year on 18 December 2016.[6]

In April 2017, Vincent released his seventh studio album, A Tribute to Mario Lanza. In May 2017, Vincent played the role of Freddy in the Australia production of My Fair Lady.

In December 2018, it was announced Vincent was among the ten acts who would be participating in Eurovision – Australia Decides in an attempt to represent Australia in the Eurovision Song Contest 2019 at the Eurovision Song Contest 2019 in Tel Aviv with the song "This Is Not the End". He performed the song in February 2019 and finished seventh out of ten acts.

== Discography ==
=== Studio albums ===
List of studio albums, with selected chart positions and certifications
Title	Album details	Peak chart positions	Certifications
Title	Album details	AUS	Certifications
My Dream – Mio Visione	Released: 2 July 2009; Label: Sony Music Australia (88697552412); Formats: CD, digital download	2	ARIA: Platinum
Compass	Released: 16 April 2010; Label: Sony Music Australia (88697672062); Formats: CD, digital download	5	ARIA: Gold
The Great Tenor Songbook	Released: 19 November 2010; Label: Sony Music Australia (88697760082); Formats: CD, digital download	18	ARIA: Gold
Songs from the Heart	Released: 14 October 2011; Label: Sony Music Australia (88697927992); Formats: CD, digital download	10	
The Quartet Sessions	Released: 18 October 2013; Label: Sony Music Australia (88765477702); Formats: CD, digital download	16	
Together (with Marina Prior)	Released: 15 April 2016; Label: Sony Music Australia (88985314732); Formats: CD, digital download	5	
A Tribute to Mario Lanza	Released: 14 April 2017; Label: Sony Music Australia (88985431722); Formats: CD, digital download	3	
The Most Wonderful Time of the Year	Released: 26 October 2018; Label: Sony Music Australia (19075898612); Formats: CD, digital download, streaming	16	
In the Eyes of a Child	Released: 6 May 2022; Label: Sony Music Australia (119439991442); Formats: CD, digital download, streaming	41	
Life Is Beautiful	Released: 18 October 2024; Label: Roccella Music (RM1001); Formats: CD, digital download, streaming	—	

=== Compilation albums ===
List of studio albums, with selected chart positions and certifications
Title	Album details	Peak chart positions
Title	Album details	AUS
Best So Far	Released: 25 April 2014; Label: Sony Music Australia (88843072242); Formats: CD, digital download	15

== Awards ==
=== Mo Awards ===
The Australian Entertainment Mo Awards (commonly known informally as the Mo Awards), were annual Australian entertainment industry awards. They recognise achievements in live entertainment in Australia from 1975 to 2016. Mark Vincent won three awards in that time.

Year	Nominee / work	Award	Result (wins only)
2007	Mark Vincent	Mats Under 18s Junior Performer of the Year	Won
2008	Mark Vincent	Johnny O'Keefe Encouragement Award	Won
2016	Mark Vincent	Vocalist of the Year	Won
