= Both Sides Now (Marina Prior album) =

Studio album by Marina Prior
- Released: 7 September 2012
- Genre: Pop music
- Length: 52:08
- Label: Ambition Entertainment/ Universal Music Australia

Marina Prior chronology
The Essential Marina Prior (2010)	Both Sides Now (2012)	Encore (2013)

Both Sides Now is the fourth studio album by Australian singer Marina Prior. It is her first studio album since Somewhere – The Songs of Sondheim and Bernstein in 1994. She says the main reason for taking so long since her last album was that she was simply busy. “The thing is because I work in theatre it is all encompassing and all consuming. You do eight shows a week and for quite a few years I went from show to show to show. I wasn’t in a position to do an album. I feel like now the time is right”.

Both Sides Now was inspired by the singer’s years as a young artist busking around Melbourne. Prior said; “This is the music I grew up on, and the songs that made me who I am. I’ve loved every moment of creating Both Sides Now. I hope you can sense that, and enjoy these songs with me. This is an album that I’ve been wanting to make for years...Finally, here it is, and I believe it has arrived at exactly the right time.”

The album peaked at number 42 in September 2012.

== Review ==
Simon Parris of Theatre People said: "The songs of love, loss and longing on Both Sides Now have all clearly been carefully selected for their beauty and their personal meaning for Prior. Mostly written in the late 1960s and 1970s, these songs are the soundtrack of Prior’s life away from the footlights and greasepaint. Traditional tunes “Waters of Babylon”, which has never sounded as beautiful, and “Scarborough Fair” are joined by tracks from some of the greatest pop songwriters of all time, such as The Beatles’ Paul McCartney and John Lennon, Joni Mitchell, Kate Bush, ABBA’s Benny Anderson and Björn Ulvaeus, and Queen’s Freddie Mercury."

== Track listing ==
CD/ DD

1. "The Man with the Child in His Eyes" - 3:22
2. "Scarborough Fair" - 3:42
3. "You Weren’t in Love With Me"- 3:33
4. "Superstar" - 4:31
5. "Both Sides, Now" - 4:21
6. "Midnight at the Oasis" - 3:30
7. "In My Life" / "Here Comes the Sun"- 3:41
8. "Love the One You're With" - 3:21
9. "Waters Of Babylon" - 2:33
10. "River" - 4:13
11. "Day You Went Away" - 3:58
12. "Windmills of Your Mind" - 3:31
13. "Killer Queen" - 3:09
14. "SOS" - 4:43

Deluxe edition (CD2)

1. "Vincent" - 4:11
2. "Songbird" - 3:06
3. "The Carnival is Over" - 3:17
4. "Time in the Bottle"- 2:58
5. "Auld Lang Syne" - 4:23

== Weekly charts ==
Chart (2012)	Peak position
Australian Albums (ARIA)	42

== Release history ==
Region	Date	Format	Label	Catalogue
Australia	7 September 2012	CD / Digital Download	Ambition Entertainment / Universal Music Australia	FANFARE080
