= Australia's Got Talent season 3 =

Australia's Got Talent
- Season 3
- Hosted by: Grant Denyer
- Judges: Red Symons; Dannii Minogue; Tom Burlinson
- Winner: Mark Vincent
- Runner-up: Jal Joshua

Release
- Original network: Seven Network
- Original release: 4 February – 22 April 2009

Season chronology
- Next → Season 4

Australia's Got Talent is an Australian reality television show, based on the original UK series, to find new talent. The third season premiered on the Seven Network on 4 February 2009 and ended on 22 April 2009. The Grand Finale followed the same format as the 2008 one: acts were eliminated in pairs, as well as each judge picking their favourite act to reappear on the show once more. Mark Vincent won the season, while Jal Joshua became the runner-up.

On the grand finale, international opera singer and winner of Britain's Got Talent series one, Paul Potts performed live in the studio. The season was won by Opera Singer, Mark Vincent, who received $250,000.

The "Order" columns lists the order of appearance each act made for every episode.

== Semi-finalists ==
Key	Winner	Runner up	Finalist	Semi-finalist (lost judges' vote)

Name	Genre	Act	Semi	Position reached
AnonMS & Perplex	Music	Rappers	3	Semi-Finalist
Aron Carvalho	Dance	Dancer	2	Semi-Finalist
Ashley Brophy	Acrobatics	Acrobat	2	Semi-Finalist
Australian Martial Arts	Acrobatics	Martial Arts Team	3	Semi-Finalist
Bobby Harrison	Music	Musician	3	Semi-Finalist
Cameo Rascale	Acrobatics	Acrobat Duo	3	Finalist
Chelsea Castillo	Singing	Singer	4	Semi-Finalist
Daniel Le	Music	Pianist	4	Semi-Finalist
Danik Abishev	Acrobatics	Acrobat	1	Finalist
Dean Atkinson	Comedy	Ventriloquist	1	Semi-Finalist
David Splatt	Music	Saw Player	3	Finalist
Duke Dreamer	Variety	Storyteller	4	Semi-Finalist
Etags	Singing	Choir	1	Semi-Finalist
Hamish & Amelia	Acrobatics	Acrobat Duo	4	Semi-Finalist
Hype Dancers	Dance	Dance Group	1	Semi-Finalist
Jal Joshua	Singing	Singer	2	Runner-Up
James Bustar	Juggling	Juggler	2	Semi-Finalist
James Corona	Singing	Opera Singer	4	Semi-Finalist
JP & His One Man Bad	Music	Musician	3	Semi-Finalist
Kobe White	Singing	Singer	3	Semi-Finalist
Lu'isa Helu	Singing	Opera Singer	2	Semi-Finalist
Luke Ha	Danger	Danger Act	3	Semi-Finalist
Macy & David	Dance	Dance Duo	1	Semi-Finalist
Mahony Brothers	Singing	Singing Duo	4	Semi-Finalist
Maree & Mutley	Animals	Dog Act	2	Semi-Finalist
Mark Vincent	Singing	Opera Singer	1	Winner
Maske	Music	Musicians	1	Semi-Finalist
Mick Lowenstein	Comedy	Comedian	1	Semi-Finalist
Mt Cotton Hot Shots	Acrobatics	Jump Rope Team	1	Semi-Finalist
Nobel Lakaev	Dance	Dancer	2	Finalist
Red Hot Rhythm	Dance	Dance Group	4	Finalist
Red Jane Show	Singing	Band	2	Semi-Finalist
Sandy Gandhi	Comedy	Comedian	2	Semi-Finalist
Short Back & Sides	Singing	A Cappella Group	4	Semi-Finalist
SoundCheck	Singing	Singing Trio	4	Semi-Finalist
The Space Cowboy	Danger	Danger Act	4	Semi-Finalist
Tyron & McKaylah	Dance	Dance Duo	4	Semi-Finalist
William Campbell	Juggling	Juggler	4	Finalist
Whips Australia	Danger	Whip Crackers	1	Semi-Finalist

== Semi-final summary ==
Buzzed Out | Judges' choice
Won Online Public Vote | Won Judges' Vote | Lost Judges' Vote

=== Semi-final 1 ===
Semi-Finalist	Order	Buzzes and Judges' Vote			Result
Semi-Finalist	Order	Burlinson	Minogue	Symons	Result
Hype Dancers	1				Eliminated
Dean Atkinson	2				Eliminated (Lost Judges' Vote)
Danik Abishev	3				Advanced (Won Judges' Vote)
Macy & David	4				Eliminated
Whips Australia	5				Eliminated
Maske	6				Eliminated
Mt Cotton Hot Shots	7				Eliminated
Etags	8				Eliminated
Mick Lowenstein	9				Eliminated
Mark Vincent	10				Advanced (Won Public Vote)

=== Semi-final 2 ===
Semi-Finalist	Order	Buzzes and Judges' Vote			Result
Semi-Finalist	Order	Burlinson	Minogue	Symons	Result
Red Jane Show	1				Eliminated
Ashley Brophy	2				Eliminated
Jal Joshua	3				Advanced (Won Public Vote)
Maree & Mutley	4				Eliminated (Lost Judges' Vote)
Sandy Gandhi	5				Eliminated
James Bustar	6				Eliminated
Aron Carvalho	7				Eliminated
Lu'isa Helu	8				Eliminated
Nobel Lakaev	9				Advanced (Won Judges' Vote)

=== Semi-final 3 ===
Semi-Finalist	Order	Buzzes and Judges' Vote			Result
Semi-Finalist	Order	Burlinson	Minogue	Symons	Result
Cameo Rascale	1				Advanced (Won Judges' Vote)
Bobby Harrison	2				Eliminated
Australian Martial Arts	3				Eliminated
Daniel Le	4				Eliminated (Lost Judges' Vote)
JP & His One Man Band	5				Eliminated
AnonMS & Perplex	6				Eliminated
Luke Ha	7				Eliminated
Kobe White	8				Eliminated
David Splatt	9				Advanced (Won Public Vote)

=== Semi-final 4 ===
Semi-Finalist	Order	Buzzes and Judges' Vote			Result
Semi-Finalist	Order	Burlinson	Minogue	Symons	Result
SoundCheck	1				Eliminated (Lost Judges' Vote)
Red Hot Rhythm	2				Advanced (Won Judges' Vote)
Duke Dreamer	3				Eliminated
Hamish & Amelia	4				Eliminated
Chelsea Castillo	5				Eliminated
Short Back & Sides	6				Eliminated
William Campbell	7				Advanced (Won Public Vote)
Mahony Brothers	8				Eliminated
The Space Cowboy	9				Eliminated
Tyron & McKaylah	10				Eliminated
James Corona	11				Eliminated

== Finals summary ==
Finalist	Order	Finished
Mark Vincent	1	Winner
Jal Joshua	2	Runner-Up
Nobel Lakaev	3	Eliminated
William Campbell	4	Eliminated
Red Hot Rhythm	5	Eliminated
Cameo Rascale	6	Eliminated
Danik Abishev	7	Eliminated
David Splatt	8	Eliminated

== Reception ==
=== Viewership ===
Episode		Airdate	Timeslot	Viewers (millions)	Night Rank	Source
1	"Auditions"	4 February 2009	Wednesday 7:00 pm	1.314	3	
2	"Auditions"	11 February 2009	Wednesday 7:00 pm	1.328	4	
3	"Auditions"	18 February 2009	Wednesday 7:00 pm	1.417	2	
4	"Auditions"	25 February 2009	Wednesday 7:00 pm	1.370	2	
5	"Semi-Finals"	4 March 2009	Wednesday 7:00 pm	1.342	4	
6	"Semi-Finals"	11 March 2009	Wednesday 7:00 pm	1.344	2	
7	"Semi-Finals"	18 March 2009	Wednesday 7:00 pm	1.325	3	
8	"Semi-Finals"	25 March 2009	Wednesday 7:00 pm	1.322	3	
9	"Recap"	1 April 2009	Wednesday 7:00 pm	1.176	5	
10	"Finals"	8 April 2009	Wednesday 7:00 pm	1.057	11	
11	"Finals"	15 April 2009	Wednesday 7:00 pm	1.510	1	
12	"Grand Finale"	22 April 2009	Wednesday 7:00 pm	1.610	1	
