= Leading Lady (album) =

Studio album by Marina Prior
- Released: November 1991
- Genre: Musical theatre, show tune
- Label: Sony Music Australia

Marina Prior chronology
Leading Lady (1991)	Aspects of Andrew Lloyd Webber (1992)

Leading Lady is the debut studio album by Australian singer Marina Prior, featuring the Melbourne Symphony Orchestra conducted by Brian Stacey. The album was released in November 1991 and peaked at number 15 on the ARIA Albums Chart in December and was certified platinum.

== Track listing ==
CD/ Cassette

1. "I Dreamed a Dream" – from Les Misérables (musical)
2. "If I Loved You" – from Carousel (musical)
3. "Wishing You Were Somehow Here Again" – from The Phantom of the Opera (1986 musical)
4. "Moonfall" – from The Mystery of Edwin Drood (musical)
5. "All I Ask of You" – from The Phantom of the Opera (1986 musical)
6. "Before I Gaze at You Again" – from Camelot (musical)
7. "Losing My Mind" – from Follies
8. "There's Gotta Be Something Better Than This" – from Sweet Charity
9. "Poor Wandering One" – from The Pirates of Penzance
10. "Can't Help Lovin' Dat Man" – from Show Boat
11. "The Last Man in My Life" – from Song and Dance
12. "Wherever He Ain't" – from Mack and Mabel
13. "Love Changes Everything" – from Aspects of Love
14. "Somewhere Over the Rainbow" – from The Wizard of Oz

== Charts ==
Chart (1991–1992)	Peak position
Australian Albums (ARIA)	15

== Certifications ==
Region	Certification	Certified units/sales
Australia (ARIA)	Platinum	70,000^{^}
^{^} Shipments figures based on certification alone.

== Release history ==
Region	Date	Format	Label	Catalogue
Australia	November 1991	CD / Cassette	Sony Music Australia	469214.2
