= Marina Prior =

Australian soprano and actress

Marina Prior AM
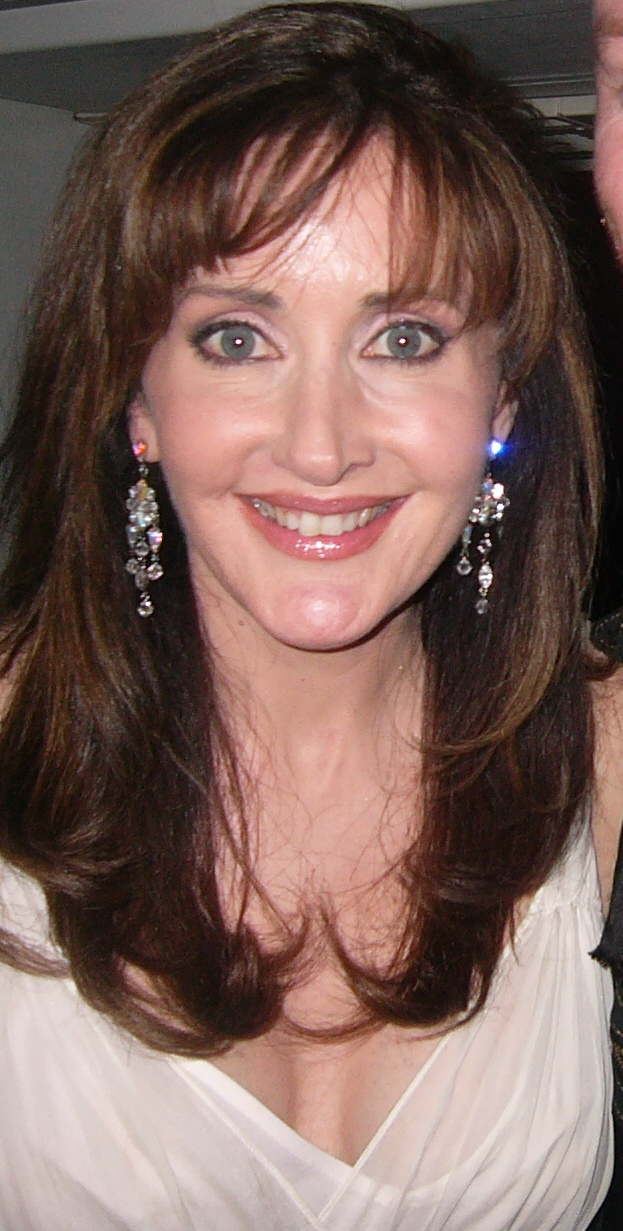
- Prior on New Year's Eve 2008 in Melbourne
- Born: 18 October 1963 (age 63); Port Moresby, Territory of Papua and New Guinea, Australia
- Education: Melbourne State College
- Occupations: Soprano, actress
- Spouse: Grant Piro

Marina Prior AM (born 18 October 1963) is an Australian soprano and actress with a career mainly in musical theatre. From 1990 to 1993, she starred as the original Christine Daaé in the Australian premiere of The Phantom of the Opera, opposite Anthony Warlow and later Rob Guest.

== Early life ==
Prior was born in Port Moresby in the Territory of Papua and New Guinea, Australia, where her father was working in the shipping industry. Her parents were members of the local Gilbert and Sullivan Society. The family returned to Australia when she was a young child and she grew up in Melbourne, where she attended Syndal South Primary School and Korowa Anglican Girls' School. She began to take singing lessons at the age of twelve and also learnt piano, flute and guitar.

In 1982 Prior started studying for a Bachelor of Music degree at the Melbourne State College (which later became a faculty of the University of Melbourne). To raise money, she worked in coffee shops and tried busking. In September 1983 she auditioned for the Victoria State Opera production of The Pirates of Penzance. She was cast as "Mabel" and this started her career in musical theatre. Initially she had tried out for the chorus, she reflected "When they told me it was 'Mabel' I nearly fainted ... I could not believe it ... It was like a fairy tale". She deferred her studies due to performance and "touring commitments".

== Theatre career ==
In 1984, Prior played the role of Guinevere in the Australian production of Camelot with Richard Harris. In 1985, she performed the dual roles of Jellylorum and Griddlebone in the Australian premiere production of Cats. In 1987, she appeared as Josephine opposite Paul Eddington in Gilbert and Sullivan's H.M.S. Pinafore, as Kathy in The Student Prince at the Lyric Opera in Brisbane and as Hope Harcourt in Anything Goes. This was followed by Cosette and the Australian premiere production of Les Misérables opposite Normie Rowe, Philip Quast, Simon Burke, and Anthony Warlow in Melbourne. She later played Fantine in the same musical in Sydney.

From 1990 to 1993, she starred as the original Christine Daaé in the Australian premiere of The Phantom of the Opera, opposite Warlow and later Rob Guest. This was followed by roles in many major productions, including Maria in West Side Story, Lily in The Secret Garden opposite Warlow and Quast (1995), Magnolia in Show Boat (1998) and the title role in The Merry Widow (1999).

Other appearances include Miss Adelaide in Guys and Dolls (2000); the title role in Annie Get Your Gun (2004), both in staged concert versions with The Production Company; in 2003 in John Misto's play Harp on the Willow (Mary O'Hara) at the Ensemble Theatre, Sydney; as Jane Smart in The Witches of Eastwick (2002); and as Belinda Blair in Noises Off (2003). Prior performed in the Australian premiere of The 25th Annual Putnam County Spelling Bee with the Melbourne Theatre Company and later with the Sydney Theatre Company. She appeared as Miss Adelaide in Guys and Dolls at the Princess Theatre, Melbourne in March 2008 and with the Melbourne Theatre Company in The Hypocrite in November 2008. She reprised her role in Guys and Dolls from March 2009 in Sydney.

Prior toured Australasia in 1994 with José Carreras. She has performed concerts with many Australian symphony orchestras. She is a regular performer at Melbourne's Carols by Candlelight and regularly appears at Opera in the Alps with David Hobson. She also appeared with Hobson at Opera by the Lock in Mildura, Victoria, in 2008.

In 2011, Prior appeared as Mrs Banks in the Australian production of the musical Mary Poppins. In 2012, she performed with David Hobson and James Morrison at the Leeuwin Estate Concert Series.

In 2014, Marina played Grizabella in the world's largest production of Cats (musical) which featured over 800 performers on stage and played at the Brisbane Convention Centre.

Prior performed in the 2015-2016 Australian production of The Sound of Music as Baroness Schraeder. The production began its national tour in Sydney on 13 December 2015 and closed in Perth on 7 October 2016.

From May 27 to 11 June 2017, Prior played the lead role of Dolly Levi in The Production Company's production of Hello, Dolly!. She then joined the Melbourne Theatre Company's production of Hay Fever from 23 September to 1 November 2017, starring as Judith Bliss. In December 2017, Prior joined the Melbourne cast of Dream Lover as the dual role of Polly Darin and Mary Douvan.

In November 2019 Prior was announced to headline as Violet Newstead in the Australian debut production of 9 to 5 The Musical whose premiere engagement - set for Sydney in April 2020 - would in fact, due to COVID-19 pandemic concerns, be delayed for two years, the production premiering with a February to May 2022 engagement at Sydney's Capitol Theatre with subsequent engagements through the summer and autumn at the Lyric Theatre at the Queensland Performing Arts Centre, Melbourne's State Theatre, and the Festival Theatre at the Adelaide Festival Centre. Prior then co-starred in the dual role of Miss Andrews and the Bird Woman in the engagement of Mary Poppins which opened January 29, 2023 at Melbourne's Her Majesty's Theatre. Prior also played the lead role of Kimberly in the 2025 Australian production of Kimberly Akimbo.

In the spring of 2025, she portrayed Madame Thénardier in the Australian performances of the Arena Spectacular World Concert Tour of Les Misérables. She reprised the role in London's West End for the show’s 40th anniversary. She's set to again perform the role in 2026 at the Royal Albert Hall, and Radio City Music Hall in New York City as a part of the international concert tour.

== Television and recordings ==
In the 1990s, Prior recorded three albums accompanied by the Melbourne Symphony Orchestra. Leading Lady, Aspects of Andrew Lloyd Webber (which received an ARIA nomination) and Somewhere – The Songs of Sondheim and Bernstein.

Prior was a judge on both the 2006 and 2007 Seven Network reality television series It Takes Two.

In 2012, Prior released her fourth studio album, Both Sides Now, which peaked at number 42. This was followed by Encore and Candlelight Christmas in 2013 and a live album in 2014 Marina Prior Live.

In 2015, Prior starred in the television opera The Divorce.

In April 2016, Prior released Together with Mark Vincent. This has become her first top 5 album on the ARIA Chart.

== Discography ==
=== Studio albums ===
List of studio albums, with selected details, chart positions and certifications
Title	Album details	Peak chart positions	Certifications
Title	Album details	AUS	Certifications
Leading Lady	Released: November 1991; Label: Sony Music Australia (469214.2); Formats: CD, cassette	15	ARIA: Platinum
Aspects of Andrew Lloyd Webber	Released: November 1992; Label: Sony Music Australia (472653.2); Formats: CD, cassette	22	ARIA: Gold
Somewhere – The Songs of Sondheim and Bernstein	Released: November 1994; Label: Sony Music Australia (478068 2); Format: CD	74	
Both Sides Now	Released: September 2012; Label: Ambition Entertainment / UMA (FANFARE080); Formats: CD, digital	42	
Encore	Released: April 2013; Label: Ambition Entertainment / UMA (FANFARE093); Formats: CD, digital	—	
Candlelight Christmas	Released: November 2013; Label: Ambition Entertainment / UMA (FANFARE127); Formats: CD, digital; re-released as A Christmas Gift (2016)	46	
Together (with Mark Vincent)	Released: 2016; Label: Ambition Entertainment / UMA (FANFARE127); Formats: CD, digital	5	

=== Compilation albums ===
List of compilation albums, with selected details
Title	Album details
All I Ask of You	Released: April 2006; Label: Sony BMG (CDR0541); Formats: CD
The Essential Marina Prior	Released: 2010; Label: Sony; Formats: CD
Songbird	Released: April 2014; Label: Ambition Entertainment / UMA (FANFARE129); Formats: 3-CD box set
Leading Lady: The Ultimate Collection	Released: 2015; Label: Ambition Entertainment / UMA (FANFARE169); Formats: CD, download

=== Live albums ===
List of live albums, with selected details
Title	Album details
Marina Prior Live	Released: December 2014; Label: Ambition Entertainment / UMA (FANFARE131); Formats: CD+DVD, download

=== Cast recordings ===
- Cats (1985)
- Anything Goes (1989)
- The Secret Garden (1995)
- Mary Poppins (2010)
- The Divorce (original soundtrack) (2015)

== Other ==
Prior was appointed 1996 Queen of Moomba by the Melbourne festival's committee.

Marina Prior has been the Goodwill Ambassador for Samaritan's Purse Australia since 2005. In this capacity she has visited several development projects in Asia, including schools, water projects and distribution of Operation Christmas Child shoe boxes. In 2009 she featured in "A Short Film About Shoe Boxes" to promote Samaritan's Purse and Operation Christmas Child.

== Awards and nominations ==
Prior was appointed a Member of the Order of Australia in the 2023 King's Birthday Honours for "significant service to musical theatre as a singer and performer".

Prior has received numerous awards; these include three Green Room Awards (Les Miserables in 1990, The Phantom of the Opera in 1991, and Kiss Me, Kate in 2005) and in 1993 the Advance Australia Award for her contribution to the performing arts.

Prior was inducted into Australia's 100 Entertainers of the Century.

=== Helpmann Awards ===
The Helpmann Awards is an awards show, celebrating live entertainment and performing arts in Australia, presented by industry group Live Performance Australia since 2001. Note: 2020 and 2021 were cancelled due to the COVID-19 pandemic.

Year	Nominee / work	Award	Result	Ref.
2003	Marina Prior - The Witches of Eastwick	Best Female Actor in a Musical	Nominated	
2006	Marina Prior - The 25th Annual Putnam County Spelling Bee	Best Female Actor in a Musical	Nominated	
2008	Marina Prior - Guys and Dolls	Best Female Actor in a Musical	Nominated	
2011	Marina Prior - Mary Poppins	Best Female Actor in a Supporting Role in a Musical	Nominated	
2018	Marina Prior - Dream Lover: The Bobby Darin Musical	Best Female Actor in a Musical	Nominated	

=== Mo Awards ===
The Australian Entertainment Mo Awards (commonly known informally as the Mo Awards), were annual Australian entertainment industry awards. They recognise achievements in live entertainment in Australia from 1975 to 2016. Marina Prior won three awards in that time.

Year	Nominee / work	Award	Result (wins only)
1990	Marina Prior	Female Musical Theatre Performer of the Year	Won
1994	Marina Prior	Female Musical Theatre Performer of the Year	Won
2008	Marina Prior	Brian Stacey Female Musical Theatre Performer of the Year	Won

== Personal life ==
From 1991 Marina Prior was married to Peter Lowrey, also a musical theatre actor: they have three children; by 2012 she had married Grant Piro, an actor.

Prior became a devout Christian in the late 1990s. She has worked for charity organisations Samaritan's Purse (on their Operation Christmas Child) and Vision Australia's Carols by Candlelight.
