= The Baker's Wife (musical) =

1989 American musical by Stephen Schwartz and Joseph Stein

- Music: Stephen Schwartz
- Lyrics: Stephen Schwartz
- Book: Joseph Stein
- Basis: The film La Femme du Boulanger by Marcel Pagnol and Jean Giono
- Productions: 1989 West End; 1997 Nappanee, Indiana; 2005 Millburn, New Jersey; 2017 Carlisle, Cumbria; 2017 Kingston upon Hull, UK; 2024 London, UK; 2025 Off-Broadway

The Baker's Wife is a 1976 musical with music and lyrics by Stephen Schwartz and the book by Joseph Stein, based on the 1938 French film of the same name by Marcel Pagnol and Jean Giono. The musical premiered in the West End in 1989 for a short run but, although establishing a dedicated cult following, has not been produced on Broadway.

== Background ==
The musical theater rights of Marcel Pagnol's 1938 film were originally optioned in 1952 by producers Cy Feuer and Ernest Martin. Composer Frank Loesser and librettist Abe Burrows, who had worked with Feuer and Martin on Guys and Dolls and How to Succeed in Business Without Really Trying were attached as authors. The production to star Bert Lahr, however, never materialized. Nearly a decade later Zero Mostel was named to take the lead.

By 1976 the rights had devolved to producer David Merrick. The production by Stephen Schwartz and Joseph Stein toured the United States for six months in 1976, undergoing major retoolings along the way. It played the Dorothy Chandler Pavilion in Los Angeles in May 1976 and also the Kennedy Center, Washington, DC. (in November 1976). Topol, as the baker Aimable, was replaced by Paul Sorvino during the last two weeks of the Kennedy Center run, and his wife Geneviève was played by Carole Demas who was eventually replaced by Patti LuPone. The production never reached Broadway, the authors having pulled out of the production in the try-out process.

== Productions ==
After hearing the song Meadowlark countless times in auditions, director Trevor Nunn persuaded the authors to mount a production. The Baker's Wife, starring Alun Armstrong and Sharon Lee-Hill, premiered at The Wolsey Theatre in Ipswich, Suffolk from October - November, transferring to the West End, Phoenix Theatre on November 27, 1989, and closed on January 6, 1990, after 56 performances. This production, too, was ill-fated: though reviews were strong and audience reaction positive, the production was steadily losing money. According to Carol De Giere: "While reviewers offered praise, audiences were small and the show closed after only 56 performances. Schwartz explains, 'The major thing that was wrong was that it was just too long.'... Nunn comments 'Every performance there had a standing ovation, which is not at all normal in the English provinces.'" Bowing to financial reality, the show closed prematurely, but received a Laurence Olivier Award nomination for Musical of the Year.

The creative team reunited for the 1997 production at The Round Barn Theatre at Amish Acres in Nappanee, Indiana, that was directed by Scott Schwartz, and the production at the Goodspeed Opera House, Norma Terris Theatre, Chester, Connecticut in November 2002.

The Paper Mill Playhouse, Milburn, New Jersey, produced the show from April 13 to May 15, 2005. The director was Gordon Greenberg, with choreography by Christopher Gattelli and the cast that starred Alice Ripley as Genevieve, Max von Essen as Dominique, Lenny Wolpe as Aimable, Gay Marshall (Denise) and Richard Pruitt (Claude). The Paper Mill production included the reworking of the relationship between the characters of Geneviève and Dominique as well as new lyrics for Proud Lady. The production received rave reviews across the board, including The New York Times, which exclaimed "after 30 years of fine-tuning, Messieurs Stein and Schwartz will have the lovely little musical they always wanted", The New York Daily News, by Howard Kissel, who urged "The whole thing could - and should - be moved to Broadway, where it could find a well-deserved home", Peter Filichia, from the Star Ledger, said: "Director Gordon Greenberg (who's staged the entire show superbly) gets the most of this moment, too. Everyone knows that man does not live by bread alone. He needs a good musical in his diet, too. The Baker's Wife certainly is one to savor."

An Australian premiere of the show, directed by Prof. Peter Fitzpatrick, had a Melbourne production in late 2007.

The York Theatre, New York City, presented a staged concert October 26–28, 2007.

The award-winning Union Theatre, Southwark, produced The Baker's Wife in September/October 2011, starring Lisa Stokke and Michael Matus. It was staged and directed by Michael Strassen and received rave reviews, prompting reviewer Mark Shenton to write: "Michael Strassen reclaims The Baker's Wife forever as the affecting miniature masterpiece that has always been lurking inside it."

The Gallery Players in Brooklyn, N.Y. produced the show's first professional New York City production March 7–29, 2015, starring Alyson Leigh Rosenfeld and Charlie Owens.

A new professional production was mounted by MKEC Productions in The Drayton Arms Theatre, Kensington in London from 16 June 2015 until Saturday 4 July.

Hull's UK City of Culture saw the regional premiere of The Baker's Wife performed at Hull Truck Theatre by Hessle Theatre Company from 18 July to 22 July 2017’, with Neal Edlin as Aimable and Hannah Irena Wilson as Geneviève.

In March 2022, Stephen Schwartz gave permission to The J2 Spotlight Musical Theater Company in New York to produce a new, intimate version of the piece. It was directed by Robert W. Schneider.

In May 2024 it was announced that the Menier Chocolate Factory in London would be staging their production from 6th July - 14th September, starring Clive Rowe, Lucie Jones, Joaquin Pedro Valdes and Josefina Gabrielle. The production was directed by Gordon Greenberg and choreographed by Matt Cole. This version of the show mostly kept the structure and order of the Paper Mill production, with some minor song changes.

In August 2025, it was announced that Ariana DeBose would play as Geneviève at the Classic Stage Company in an Off-Broadway production in October 2025.

== Synopsis ==
=== Act One ===
The act opens in the early autumn of the mid-1930s in the small French village of Concorde. At a local cafe, the proprietor's wife, Denise, tends to her chores while singing "Chanson" in both French and English. Through the song, she reflects on her repetitive daily routine and expresses a desire for unexpected change.

Focus is shifted to the customers at the tables. Bits of conversation are heard: complaints from a gardener whose neighbor's tree is shading his spinach; an argument between the local priest and the school teacher who has been teaching that Joan of Arc "thought" she heard voices; the owner of a well quarrelling with the neighbor whose dog had breached that well seven years previously. The bickering villagers insist to one another that their lives would be much better "If It Wasn't for You". All are anticipating the arrival of the baker: the village has been without bread since the previous baker died, and tensions are running higher than normal.

The Marquis enters with his three "nieces" and welcomes the new baker, Aimable Castagnet. Accurately named, he is a jolly, middle-aged fellow. With him is his young and beautiful wife Geneviève, whom the Marquis mistakes for the baker's daughter. The error is quickly addressed, but does not go unremarked by the townspeople. With Pompom, their cat, the couple is shown to their new home — with comments from the townsfolk, about the baker robbing the cradle, following in their wake.

In their new bakery, Aimable is clearly pleased with his new shop. To Geneviève, he sings "Merci, Madame", as enchanted with her as he is with his new surroundings. He is excited about the prospects of a prosperous life with a family. The villagers, too, are pleased with the return of "Bread" to the small town.

The customers argue about their place in line in the small shop, eager to sample the wares of the new baker. Others gossip about the Marquis and his nieces; and Antoine, one of the villagers, asks Aimable how an old man like him was able to snare the beautiful Geneviève. "God was good to me," he replies, and Geneviève reminds the villagers that not only did her husband choose her, she chose him, too — and, she insists, she couldn't be happier. She smiles at the customers but, embarrassed by their prying, rushes inside in tears. She sings of the "Gifts of Love" she's received from men in her past: her passionate affair with a married man named Paul, and her gentler feelings for Aimable. Closing the door on her past, she resolves to be a good wife to the baker.

While picking up the Marquis' pastry order, his driver, Dominique, eyes Geneviève, mistaking her for the baker's daughter, just as the Marquis himself did earlier. Geneviève corrects the handsome chauffeur, but he cockily insists on addressing her as Mademoiselle. Geneviève insists, "Madame!", but he continues flirting with her, flustering her. Aimable returns after trying to find Pompom and reports that the cat has run off.

Some time later in the village square, Dominique again advances upon Geneviève. She rebuffs him, reminding him that she is happily married, but he resolves that he will be with his "Proud Lady".

The villagers gather again outside the café, engaged in their usual squabbles. The baker and his wife arrive and sit at a table near Antoine who continues to tease them about the difference in their ages. He implies that while the baker may be able to create the perfect croissant, his ability to create a child might have passed. Dominique comes to the couple's defense, hitting Antoine, but Genevieve is humiliated by the entire scene and exits in a huff. The men of the village slyly advise one another to "Look For the Woman" whenever conflict arises among them: "It's when the hen walks into the barnyard that the roosters start pecking at each other."

That evening, we see three couples — including the baker and his wife — getting ready for bed. Dominique and his guitar-toting friend Philippe plot their evening in the town square, and as the three couples end their reprise of "Chanson", Dominique and Philippe start their "Serenade". The baker believes their song is a tribute offered in thanks for his baking, but Geneviève understands correctly that Dominique is singing to her. Aimable, ever the good man, sends Geneviève to give Dominique some unsold baguettes. She castigates her insistent suitor, but Dominique is undeterred. Despite her protests, Geneviève is unable to resist him, and they decide to meet an hour later and run off together.

Aimable calls down to Geneviève, and she replies that she'll return to bed in a minute. As he drops off to sleep, she contemplates her situation, singing the legend of the "Meadowlark". In the story, the bird decides to stay with the old king who adored her — and perishes of sadness, having missed her opportunity to fly away with the sun-god who had wooed her. Resisting the meadowlark's sad fate, Geneviève embarks for an unknown future with her "beautiful young man".

The neighbors are awakened to a fire in the bakery's oven, where the baker finds charred loaves. Usually Geneviève is the early riser of the household, and he begins to search for her, believing that she has gone in search for Pompom. A crowd begins to gather and the gossip begins at once, "Buzz A-Buzz": they know Aimable's search will yield neither cat nor wife.

The Marquis arrives and takes the baker aside, telling him that Geneviève had run off with his chauffeur in the Marquis' Peugeot. Philippe arrives and confirms the story, but Aimable chooses to believe that Geneviève has merely gone to visit her mother. As the gossip continues, the Marquis threatens to report his stolen car to the police, and to have the two lovers arrested. The gossiping townsfolk gleefully agree that the whole outrageous scandal is the "best thing to happen in this town in all my life!"

=== Act Two ===
The second act opens as the first, with Denise reprising her "Chanson". The villagers reprise "If It Wasn't for You", while keeping an eye on the baker: they are relieved to see him begin a new batch of dough. The teacher and the priest argue again, the priest accusing the villagers of contaminating Genevieve with their immoral conduct, the teacher championing free will. The Marquis dismisses both explanations, insisting that Genevieve's behavior was simple human nature—that we are all captive to the joys of the flesh.

Aimable crosses to the café to inform the customers that the bread will be ready momentarily. The typically sober baker orders a cognac, and another, and sings tipsily that Genevieve will be home on an "Any-Day-Now Day": she has just gone to visit her mother. In an attempt to sober him up, the villagers follow him into the bakery, only to find it in a shambles. Aimable collapses amongst the spilled flour, dough hanging from the ceiling, and burnt loaves of bread.

The villagers realize that the town is in danger of being once again without a baker, and they blame the despondent baker's runaway wife for the sorry state of affairs. In the closed bakery, they try to cheer up Aimable and get him baking again by telling him that he's the "Luckiest Man in the World": he's been spared the boredom and arguments of married life.

The Marquis enters, telling Aimable that all he needs to cheer up is some "Feminine Companionship," even offering to loan his "nieces". The villagers ask the Marquis if the girls are really his nieces, to which he responds, "What is a niece but the daughter of a brother, and as I consider all men my brothers...." The girls surround the baker, flirting and caressing him. The priest enters and, shocked at the scene, begins feuding with the Marquis. The villagers join in the fray, and the baker throws them all out.

At a town meeting in the church, Aimable admits that he knows that Geneviève has run off. He offers the Marquis his life savings to deter him from hunting down the couple. He leaves the church, and the villagers—chastened by the aging man's selflessness even in the face of profound anguish—vow to work together to find Geneviève and persuade her to return to her husband.

Alone in the bakery, Aimable decides "If I Have to Live Alone", that he will do so with dignity.

The villagers are again at the cafe, and Antoine enters claiming that he has found the young couple at a hotel in a nearby town. They agree to form a search party, and the Marquis, the priest, and the teacher go after the outcasts to persuade the baker's wife to return home. Left behind, the women of the town comment ruefully on the "Romance" that is missing from their own lives.

In a small hotel room, Geneviève and Dominique are together, but all is not well. She admits her passion for the young man, but wonders "Where Is the Warmth?" She gathers her things and leaves him asleep.

At a bus stop, the villagers encounter Geneviève on her way to Marseille. They beg her to return but, guilt-stricken and ashamed, she tells them that she can never go home again. They eventually convince her to return: "all sins are forgivable".

The villagers are asked to remain in their houses so as to not embarrass Geneviève when she arrives. Escorted by the priest and the Marquis, Geneviève walks through the empty street to the bakery and cautiously approaches her door.

She finds Aimable and attempts to tell him the truth, but he awkwardly refuses to listen, offering her dinner and insisting that she has returned from visiting her mother. Pompom arrives at the window, and Aimable angrily chastises the cat for running after "some tom that looked good in the moonlight." He unleashes all of his pent-up bitterness toward Geneviève on the small cat, but offers it a saucer of milk. He has faithfully refilled the milk each day, and when Aimable charges that the cat will run off yet again, a tearful Geneviève assures him that "she will not leave". Reconciled, the two begin to prepare the bread for the next day.

Denise begins the new day at the café, reprising her "Chanson", joined by the town in harmony.

== Cast and characters ==
Character	West End	Paper Mill Playhouse	Off-West End	Off-Broadway
Character	1989	2005	2024	2025
Genevieve Castagnet	Sharon Lee Hill	Alice Ripley	Lucie Jones	Ariana DeBose
Aimable Castagnet	Alun Armstrong	Lenny Wolpe	Clive Rowe	Scott Bakula
Dominique	Drue Williams	Max von Essen	Joaquin Pedro Valdes	Kevin William Paul
Denise	Jill Martin	Gay Marshall	Josefina Gabrielle	Judy Kuhn
Hortense	Myra Sands	Cynthia Darlow	Finty Williams	Sally Murphy
Therese	Tricia Deighton	Joy Franz	Sutara Gayle	Alma Cuervo
Marquis	James Villiers	Laurent Giroux	Michael Matus	Nathan Lee Graham
Teacher		Mitchell Greenberg	Mark Extance	Arnie Burton
Priest	Neil McCaul	Jamie LaVerdiere	Matthew Seadon-Young	Will Roland
Nicole	Janet Devenish	Jacque Carnahan	Bobbie Chambers	Hailey Thomas
Antoine	Sidney Livingstone	Kevin Del Aguila	David Seadon-Young	Kevin Del Aguila
Barnaby	Simon Clark	Michael Medeiros	Liam Tamne	Manu Narayan
Claude	George Raistrick	Richard Pruitt	Norman Pace	Robert Cuccioli
Philippe	Rob Jarvis	Clinton Leo Zugel	Jack Gardner	Mason Olshavsky

== Songs ==
This song list reflects the recording of the 1990 London production.

Act I

- "Chanson" – Denise
- "If It Wasn't for You" – Teacher, Priest, Marquis, and Villagers
- "Merci, Madame" – Aimable and Geneviève
- "Bread" – Villagers
- "Gifts of Love" – Geneviève
- "Plain and Simple" ^{‡} – Aimable and Geneviève
- "Proud Lady" – Dominique
- "Look for the Woman" ^{‡} – Teacher, Marquis, Claude, Barnaby, Antoine, Casimir, Pierre, Doumergue
- "Chanson (Reprise)" – Denise
- "Serenade" – Dominique, Philippe, Aimable, and Geneviève
- "Meadowlark" – Geneviève
- "Buzz A-Buzz" ^{‡} – Aimable, Marquis, Philippe, Villagers
- "Any Day Now" ^{†} - Aimable, Teacher, Priest, Marquis, Philippe, Claude, Denise, Hortense, Barnaby, Villagers

Act II

- "Chanson (Reprise)" – Denise
- "If It Wasn't for You" (Reprise) – Priest, Teacher, Marquis, and Villagers
- "Any-Day-Now Day" ^{‡} – Aimable, Villagers
- "Endless Delights" ^{‡} – Dominique, Geneviève
- "Luckiest Man in the World" – Claude, Village Men, Marquis, Simone, Inès, Nicole
- "Feminine Companionship" – Claude, Village Men, Marquis, Simone, Inès, Nicole
- "If I Have to Live Alone" – Aimable
- "Romance" – Denise, Hortense, Thérèse, Simone, Inez, Nicole
- "Where is the Warmth?" – Geneviève
- "Gifts of Love (Reprise)" – Denise, Aimable, Geneviève, Villagers
- "Chanson (Reprise)" ^{‡} – Denise, Aimable, Geneviève, Villagers

Key:

- ^{†} Song added to 1990 song list
- ^{‡} Song cut in Paper Mill Playhouse and London's Menier Chocolate Factory productions

== Cast recordings ==
Although bootleg live recordings circulated among fans, a full cast album of The Baker's Wife was not recorded during its original 1976 tour. During the show's Boston run, it was seen by long-time theatre enthusiasts Bruce and Doris Yeko, who had recently started the record label Take Home Tunes, devoted to the preservation of musical scores that might not otherwise be recorded. Impressed by the score, the Yekos contacted Stephen Schwartz, who suggested to them that a full cast album might be recorded. At that time, however, the couple had little experience in record production, having only released an EP of songs from The Robber Bridegroom. However, after The Baker's Wife closed on the road, the Yekos and Schwartz negotiated to record an LP of excerpts from the score, with the composer himself selecting what he considered to be the best songs (rather than those, necessarily, that might advance the plot).

The recording sessions took place in early 1977 in an apartment studio in Greenwich Village that was too small to accommodate an ensemble. As a result, Schwartz suggested that, to save both space and money, only the songs performed by the three protagonists would be recorded. The resulting LP contained six solo numbers and five duets, performed by original cast members Kurt Peterson, Paul Sorvino, and Patti LuPone, along with Terri Ralston (who sang "Chanson").

At the same time, the Yekos produced and released an EP with additional songs performed by original cast member Sorvino along with Darlene Conley, Denise Lor, and Portia Nelson (who were not in the touring production) and composer/lyricist Stephen Schwartz and his wife, Carol.

This "original cast" LP of The Baker's Wife became very popular. It has since been re-released on CD twice: once in 1989 (the first CD to be released by Bruce Yeko's Original Cast label) and again in 1992.

The 1990 London production, directed by Trevor Nunn, was recorded and released on the JAY label as a lavish two-CD set. This comprised 20 songs, of which half had been previously heard on the 1976 LP and one other from the studio cast EP. The remaining songs, not previously recorded, either came from the original tour, the 1985 off-Broadway revival, or had been specially written for the new London production.

Since the late 1980s, songs from the show have also been recorded by solo artists. "Meadowlark" is by far the most frequently covered song, having been recorded by Patti Lupone, Sarah Brightman, Betty Buckley, Susan Egan, Liz Callaway, Sandy Campbell, Meredith Braun, Dianne Pilkington, Judy Kuhn, Roslyn Kind, Susannah Mars, Erika Henningsen, Linzi Hateley, and others.

== Awards and nominations ==
=== 1989 West End premiere ===
Year	Award	Category	Work	Result	Ref.
1990	Laurence Olivier Awards	Musical of the Year		Nominated	

=== 2025 Off-Broadway revival ===
Year	Award	Category	Work	Result	Ref.
2026	Outer Critics Circle Award	Outstanding Revival of a Musical		Nominated	
2026	Outer Critics Circle Award	Outstanding Featured Performer in an Off-Broadway Musical	Judy Kuhn	Won	
2026	Outer Critics Circle Award	Outstanding Scenic Design	Jason Sherwood	Nominated	
2026	Lucille Lortel Award	Outstanding Featured Performer in a Musical	Judy Kuhn	Nominated	
2026	Drama Desk Award	Outstanding Revival of a Musical		Nominated	
2026	Drama Desk Award	Outstanding Featured Performance in a Musical	Judy Kuhn	Won	
2026	Drama Desk Award	Outstanding Direction of a Musical	Gordon Greenberg	Nominated	
2026	Drama Desk Award	Outstanding Scenic Design of a Musical	Jason Sherwood	Nominated	
2026	Drama Desk Award	Outstanding Costume Design of a Musical	Catherine Zuber	Nominated	
2026	Drama Desk Award	Outstanding Lighting Design of a Musical	Bradley King	Nominated	
2026	Drama Desk Award	Outstanding Sound Design of a Musical	Jason Crystal	Nominated	
