= Ambition Entertainment =

- Industry: Music, entertainment
- Genre: Adult Contemporary music, Jazz music, Classical music, Country music
- Founded: 2009
- Headquarters: Brisbane City, Brisbane, Australia
- Products: Music, entertainment
- Website: Official website

Ambition Entertainment is an entertainment company consisting of five core businesses: recorded music, artist management, music publishing, artist merchandise and live events.

Ambition Entertainment is made up of labels

- Ambition Records
- Fanfare Records
- Fanfare Classics
- Fanfare Jazz
- One Take Records
- Ambition Special Products

All Ambition Entertainment releases are distributed in Australia by Sony Music Entertainment Australia Pty Ltd. Ambition Entertainment is fully accredited by ARIA and report sales daily for chart inclusion.

In September 2016, it was announced that Ambition Entertainment had signed a distribution deal with Sony Music Australia.

Ambitions' record label focus on adult contemporary, jazz, classical and country music.

== Current artists ==
- Anthony Warlow
- Beccy Cole
- Captain & Tennille
- Charlie A'Court
- Chris Cobb
- Colin Buchanan
- Dave Loew
- Denis Walter
- Don Burrows
- Gilbert O'Sullivan
- James Morrison
- Jon English
- Julie Anthony
- K.D. Lang
- Kevin Johnson
- Leo Sayer
- Marcia Hines
- Marina Prior
- Mark Sholtez
- Mary Kiani
- Michael Crawford
- Mormon Tabernacle Choir
- Mirusia
- Nicolas De Angelis
- Olivia Newton-John
- Paulini
- Renée Geyer
- Richard Clayderman
- Russell Morris
- The Celtic Tenors
- The Everly Brothers
- Tim Draxl
- Tina Arena
- Todd McKenney
- Wendy Matthews
