= The Music of the Night =

1986 song from The Phantom of the Opera

"The Music of the Night" (also labelled as just "Music of the Night" and originally labeled as "Married Man") is a major song from the 1986 musical The Phantom of the Opera. The music was written by Andrew Lloyd Webber, with lyrics by Charles Hart and Richard Stilgoe. Initially made famous by Michael Crawford, the actor who originated the role of the Phantom both in the West End and on Broadway, "The Music of the Night" has appeared on many cast recordings of the musical, sold millions of copies worldwide, and has been translated into many languages.

== Synopsis ==
"The Music of the Night" is sung immediately following "The Phantom of the Opera", after the Phantom lures Christine Daaé to his lair beneath the Opera House. He seduces Christine with "his music" of the night, his voice putting her into a type of trance. He sings of his unspoken love for her and urges her to forget the world and life she knew before. The Phantom leads Christine around his lair, eventually pulling back a curtain to reveal a mannequin dressed in a wedding gown resembling Christine. When she approaches it, it suddenly moves, causing her to faint. The Phantom then carries Christine to a bed, where he lays her down and goes on to write his music.

== Composition ==
Sarah Brightman declared, at the London Royal Albert Hall concert in 1997, that the song was originally written by Andrew Lloyd Webber for her, the first time he met her. That version had different lyrics and was called "Married Man". The lyrics were later rewritten, and the song was added to The Phantom of the Opera.

A year before The Phantom Of The Opera opened at Her Majesty's Theatre, the original version of the song was performed at Andrew Lloyd Webber's own theatre at Sydmonton, along with the first drafts of the show. The audience were a specially gathered group of Webber's acquaintances. The Phantom was played by Colm Wilkinson. The lyrics were very different from the ones used in the three variations of the song, as lyricist Charles Hart had not yet become involved in the project.

Due to similarities between the song and a recurring melody in Giacomo Puccini's 1910 opera, La fanciulla del West (The Girl of the Golden West), the Puccini estate filed lawsuit against Webber, accusing him of plagiarism. An agreement was settled out of court, and details were not released to the public.

== Recordings ==
To promote The Phantom of the Opera's opening in London, the production's producers, The Really Useful Group, filmed a video starring Crawford and Sarah Brightman (who did not sing).

The song has also been covered by many artists.

- 1992: Sarah Brightman recorded "The Music of the Night" for her solo album, Sarah Brightman Sings the Music of Andrew Lloyd Webber. This version has different lyrics, replacing the line "To the power of the music that I write", with "To the harmony which dreams alone can write", and a different ending.
- 2010: Meryl Davis and Charlie White used the song when ice dancing at the Olympic Games in Vancouver and won a silver medal.
- 2010: Mark Vincent covered the song for his album Compass.
- 2012: Jackie Evancho performed it for her movie-themed concert, Songs from the Silver Screen. This version included the words, "compose the music of the night".
- 2016: Mauro Calderon covered the song on his album Broadway and Éxitos.
- 2016: Marina Prior and Mark Vincent covered the song on their album Together.
- 2019: Alina Zagitova used the song on her short program while winning World Champion 2019 title in ladies event.

== Michael Crawford version ==
"The Music of the Night / Wishing You Were Somehow Here Again"

Single by Michael Crawford and Sarah Brightman

from the album The Phantom of the Opera
- A-side: "Wishing You Were Somehow Here Again"
- Released: January 9, 1987
- Genre: Stage & Screen
- Length: 5:12
- Label: Polydor
- Songwriter: Andrew Lloyd Webber
- Producer: Andrew Lloyd Webber

Sarah Brightman singles chronology
| "All I Ask of You" (1986) | "The Music of the Night / Wishing You Were Somehow Here Again" (1987) | "Doretta's Dream" (1987) |

Polydor released "The Music of the Night" by Michael Crawford and "Wishing You Were Somehow Here Again" by Sarah Brightman as a double A-side single on 9 January 1987. The single was released to promote the musical The Phantom of the Opera. A re-recording of the song was included on Crawford's album With Love / The Phantom Unmasked (1989).

=== Track listings and formats ===
==== UK 7" Single [POSP 803] ====
| No. | Title | Length |
|---|---|---|
| 1. | "The Music of the Night" | 5:12 |
| 2. | "Wishing You Were Somehow Here Again" | 2:57 |

UK 12" Single [POSPX 803]

| No. | Title | Length |
|---|---|---|
| 1. | "The Music of the Night" | 5:12 |
| 2. | "All I Ask of You" | 4:05 |
| 3. | "Wishing You Were Somehow Here Again" | 3:05 |
| 4. | "The Phantom of the Opera" | 4:17 |

=== Charts ===
| Chart (1987) | Peak Position |
|---|---|
| UK Singles (OCC) | 7 |

== Barbra Streisand & Michael Crawford version ==
"The Music of the Night"

Single by Barbra Streisand and Michael Crawford

from the album Back to Broadway
- B-side: "Children Will Listen"
- Released: 15 January 1993
- Genre: Musical; ballad
- Length: 5:37
- Label: Columbia Records
- Songwriters: Andrew Lloyd Webber; Charles Hart

Barbra Streisand singles chronology
| "Speak Low" (1993) | "The Music of the Night" (1993) | "As If We Never Said Goodbye" (1994) |

In 1993, American singer Barbra Streisand and British actor Michael Crawford released a duet version of "The Music of the Night". It is taken from Streisand's twenty-sixth studio album, Back to Broadway (1993), and peaked at number 54 on the UK Singles Chart. This version was also later included on Crawford's own album A Touch of Music in the Night (1993).

=== Critical reception ===
The duet received favorable reviews from music critics. Ron Fell from the Gavin Report declared it as "the year's most triumphant duet". British Lennox Herald wrote, "Familiar song which might be a hit again, given the high profiles of both stars." Pan-European magazine Music & Media said it's "easily the most beautifully executed song" off the Back To Broadway album, adding, "It will hypnotise anyone with a taste for real voices into playing it." A reviewer from People Magazine found that Streisand, "crossing cadenzas with Broadway's first Phantom", Michael Crawford "goes for grandeur instead of intimacy and winds up with grandiosity." The Stage stated that they both are "squeezing the last drop" out of "Music of the Night". Richard Harrington from The Washington Post declared it as "an anthemic duet in which Crawford's warm, theatrical subtlety is overwhelmed by Streisand's undiminishable power (just listen to her attempt to make real the phrase "tremulous and tender")."

=== Charts ===
| Chart (1994) | Peak position |
|---|---|
| UK Singles (OCC) | 54 |

== See also ==
- Andrew Lloyd Webber
- 'Erik' (The Phantom)
