= Meadowlark (song) =

Song from the 1989 musical the Baker's Wife

Song
- Written: 1989
- Songwriter: Stephen Schwartz

Meadowlark is a song from the musical The Baker's Wife, with music and lyrics by Stephen Schwartz. It has been performed by several famous Broadway singers such as Carole Demas, Patti LuPone, Betty Buckley, Liz Callaway, Alice Ripley, Susan Egan, Judy Kuhn, Julia Murney, Sarah Brightman, Lea Salonga, Alex Newell, Tituss Burgess, and Andrew Rannells.

In the musical, it is sung by the character Geneviève, trying to decide whether she should stay with her husband or run off with a younger man. She likens her situation to a fairy tale about a meadowlark who lived with a king who adored her. One day, the sun god approached the meadowlark and urged her to come with him. The meadowlark refused and perished. At the end of the song, Geneviève decides to leave with the younger man.
