= The Seekers discography =

- Studio albums: 12
- Live albums: 7
- Compilation albums: 35

The Seekers were an Australian folk music group formed in 1962 consisting of Athol Guy, Keith Potger, Bruce Woodley and Judith Durham.

The quartet were first active from 1962 to 1968 when Durham left to pursue a solo career. The group re-formed in 1975 and recruited Louisa Wisseling to provide vocals, but disbanded again in 1978. In 1988, the group re-formed with Julie Anthony and then (from 1990–91) Karen Knowles providing vocals. In 1993, Durham reunited with original members Guy, Potger and Woodley, and they toured on and off from then until 2022, the group’s disbandment due to the death of Judith Durham that year.

Below is an extensive discography of their hits across the world, where they scored numerous successes in countries such as Australia, New Zealand, United Kingdom and the United States.

== Albums ==
=== Studio albums ===
Title	Album details	Chart positions				Certifications (sales thresholds)
Title	Album details	AUS	NZ	UK	US	Certifications (sales thresholds)
Introducing the Seekers	Released: 1963; Label: W&G	5	—	—	145	
The Seekers	also known as Roving with the Seekers; Released: 1964; Label: W&G	—	—	—	—	
Hide & Seekers	also known as The Four & Only Seekers or The New Seekers; Released: 1964; Label: W&G	—	—	—	62	
A World of Our Own	also known as The Seekers; Released: 1965; Label: Columbia, EMI Music Australia	—	—	5	123	
Come the Day	also known as Georgy Girl; Released: September 1966; Label: Columbia, EMI	7	—	3	10	
Seekers Seen in Green	Released: November 1967; Label: Columbia, EMi	2	—	15	—	
The Seekers	features Louisa Wisseling on vocals; Released: 1975; Label: Astor, Polydor	17	—	—	—	
Giving and Taking	features Louisa Wisseling on vocals; Released: July 1976; Label: Astor, Polydor	78	5	—	—	
A Little Bit of Country	features Cheryl Webb on vocals; Released: April 1980; Label: Hammard	84	—	—	—	
Live On	features Julie Anthony on vocals; Released: March 1989; Label: Polydor Records	26	—	—	—	ARIA: Gold
Future Road	credited to Judith Durham and The Seekers; Released: October 1997; Label: EMI Music Australia	4	13	—	—	ARIA: Platinum
Morningtown Ride to Christmas	Released: November 2001; Label: Sony Music Australia	18	—	—	—	ARIA: Platinum
Back to Our Roots	Credited to The Original Seekers; Released: June 2019; Label: Sony Music Australia	107	—	—	—	
"—" denotes a recording that did not chart, position unknown or was not released in that territory.

=== Live albums ===
Title	Album details	Chart positions			Certifications (sales thresholds)
Title	Album details	AUS	NZ	UK	Certifications (sales thresholds)
Live at the Talk of the Town	Released: September 1968; Label: Columbia, EMI	—	—	2	
25 Year Reunion Celebration (with Judith Durham)	Released: November 1993; Label: EMI Music Australia	9	22	93	ARIA: Platinum
1968 BBC Farewell Spectacular (with Judith Durham)	Released: November 1999; Label: Mushroom	12	—	—	ARIA: Gold
Night of Nights... Live!	Released: 2002; Label: Mushroom	26	—	—	
Farewell	Released: 12 April 2019; Label: Decca	3	—	—	
The Carnival of Hits Tour 2000	Released: 23 August 2019; Label: Decca	—	—	—	
Live in the UK	Released: 2 July 2021; Label: Decca	28	—	—	
"—" denotes a recording that did not chart, position unknown or was not released in that territory.

=== Compilation albums ===
List of Charting compilations
Title	Album details	Chart positions			Certifications (sales thresholds)
Title	Album details	AUS	NZ	UK	Certifications (sales thresholds)
The Seekers Sing Their Big Hits	Released: 1965; Label: W&G Records	3	—	—	
Introducing the Seekers Big Hits	Released: 1967; Label: W&G Records	5	—	—	
The Seekers' Greatest Hits	Released: July 1968; Label: EMI, Columbia Records	1	—	—N/a	
The Best of The Seekers	Released: November 1968; Label: EMI	—N/a	—	1	
The Carnival Is Over	Released: 1969; Label: Columbia	17	—	—	
Something Old/Something New (with The New Seekers)	Released: August 1984; Label: EMI, Seekers	55	—	—	
The Silver Jubilee Album	Released: 29 March 1993; Label: EMI Music Australia	3	3	—	ARIA: Platinum; RIANZ: Gold
A Carnival of Hits	Released: April 1994; Label: EMI Music	—N/a	—N/a	7	
The Best of The Seekers	Released: 1997; Label: Parlophone	45	—	—	
The Ultimate Collection	Released: 2003; Label: EMI /Parlophone	123	—	—	
Greatest Hits	Released: 13 June 2009; Label: EMI Australia	31	—	34	
The Golden Jubilee Album	Released: 16 November 2012; Label: EMI Music	10	2	—	ARIA: Gold; RIANZ: Platinum
We Wish You a Merry Christmas	Released: November 2019; Label: Decca	21	—	—	
Hidden Treasures – Volume 1	Released: 22 May 2020; Label: Universal Music Australia	21	—	—	
Hidden Treasures – Volume 2	Released: 23 October 2020; Label: Universal Music Australia	56	—	—	
Carry Me (The Seekers 60th Anniversary)	Released: 25 November 2022; Label: Decca Australia	10	—	—	
"—" denotes releases that did not chart or were not released in that territory.

==== Other official compilation albums ====
- More of the Fabulous Seekers (1968)
- Seekers Golden Collection (1969)
- The Seekers (1969)
- The Sound of the Seekers (1970)
- The Seekers Again (1973)
- 25 Favourites (1973)
- The Very Best of the Seekers (1974)
- The Second Album of the Very Best of The Seekers (1975)
- Collector Series – The Seekers (1977)
- The Very Best of The Seekers (1978)
- All Around the World (1978)
- 24 Golden Greats (1978)
- This Is The Seekers (1980)
- The Hits of The Seekers (1983)
- Greatest Hits (1985)
- An Hour of The Seekers (1988)
- Ideal (1990)
- Capitol Collectors Series (1992)
- This Is The Seekers (1994)
- Collection (1998)
- The Very Best of The Seekers (1998)
- A's, B's & EP's (2004)
- The Ultimate Collection (2007)

== Box sets ==
List of Box Sets
Title	Album details	Chart positions		Certifications (sales thresholds)
Title	Album details	AUS	NZ	Certifications (sales thresholds)
The Seekers Complete	Released: 8 December 1995; Label: Columbia, EMI; Note: 5CD Set	17	—	ARIA: Gold
Treasure Chest	Released: 28 April 1997; Label: Columbia, EMI; Note: 3CD Set	7	—	ARIA: Gold
All Bound for Morningtown	Released: 22 May 2009; Label: EMI Music Australia, Parlophone Records; Note: 4CD Set	—	36	
"—" denotes releases that did not chart or were not released in that territory.

== Singles ==
Title	Year	Peak chart positions										Album
Title	Year	AUS	CAN	IRE	NOR	NZ	SA	SWE	UK	US	US AC	Album
"Kumbaya"	1963	—	—	—	—	—	—	—	—	—	—	Introducing the Seekers
"Waltzing Matilda"	1963	74	—	—	—	—	—	—	—	—	—	The Seekers
"Myra"	1964	—	—	—	—	—	—	—	—	—	—	Non-album singles
"I'll Never Find Another You"	1964	1	3	2	6	—	16	15	1	4	2	Non-album singles
"What Have They Done to the Rain"	1965	79	—	—	—	—	—	—	—	—	—	Hide & Seekers
"A World of Our Own"	1965	2	5	2	5	—	1	12	3	19	2	A World of Our Own
"Chilly Winds"	1965	—	—	—	—	—	—	—	—	122	—	Hide & Seekers
"Morningtown Ride"	1965	8	27	2	—	—	9	8	2	44	13	Hide & Seekers
"Cotton Fields"	1965	—	—	—	—	—	—	—	—	—	—	The Seekers
"The Carnival Is Over"	1965	1	—	1	3	1	2	—	1	105	27	Non-album single
"Lady Mary"	1965	—	—	—	—	—	—	—	—	—	—	Hide & Seekers
"Someday, One Day"	1966	4	—	—	—	11	—	—	11	—	—	Non-album singles
"Walk with Me"	1966	33	—	—	—	—	5	—	10	—	—	Non-album singles
"Georgy Girl"	1966	1	1	10	—	1	10	14	3	2	7	Come the Day
"Isa Lei"	1966	—	—	—	—	—	—	—	—	—	—	The Seekers
"Myra (Shake Up the Party)"	1967	40	—	—	—	—	—	—	—	—	—	Non-album single
"On the Other Side"	1967	24	—	—	—	—	—	—	—	115	—	Seekers Seen in Green
"When Will the Good Apples Fall"	1967	43	—	10	—	—	12	—	11	—	14	Non-album singles
"Emerald City"	1967	32	—	—	—	—	—	—	50	—	—	Non-album singles
"Love Is Kind, Love Is Wine"	1968	51	—	—	—	—	—	—	—	135	21	Live at the Talk of the Town
"Days of My Life"	1968	73	—	—	—	—	—	—	—	—	—	Non-album singles
"With My Swag All on My Shoulder"	1968	—	—	—	—	—	—	—	—	—	—	Live at the Talk of the Town
"Island of Dreams"	1968	—	—	—	—	—	—	—	—	—	—	Non-album singles
"Children Go Where I Send You"	1969	—	—	—	—	—	—	—	—	—	—	Non-album singles
"Colours of My Life"	1969	—	—	—	—	—	—	—	—	—	—	Seekers Seen in Green
"Sparrow Song"	1975	7	—	—	—	—	—	—	—	—	—	The Seekers
"Love Isn't Love Until You Give It Away"	1975	—	—	—	—	—	—	—	—	—	—	Non-album single
"Reunion"	1975	83	—	—	—	—	—	—	—	—	—	The Seekers
"Break These Chains"	1976	—	—	—	—	—	—	—	—	—	—	The Seekers
"A Part of You"	1976	—	—	—	—	—	—	—	—	—	—	Giving and Taking
"Where in the World"	1976	55	—	—	—	—	—	—	—	—	—	Giving and Taking
"Giving and Taking"	1976	—	—	—	—	—	—	—	—	—	—	Giving and Taking
"Vagabond"	1977	—	—	—	—	—	—	—	—	—	—	Non-album single
"Building Bridges"	1989	68	—	—	—	—	—	—	—	—	—	Live On
"How Can a Love So Wrong Be So Right"	1989	118	—	—	—	—	—	—	—	—	—	Live On
"Keep a Dream in Your Pocket"	1993	178	—	—	—	—	—	—	—	—	—	25 Year Reunion Celebration
"A World of Our Own" (re-recording)	1994	—	—	—	—	—	—	—	76	—	—	A Carnival of Hits
"Georgy Girl" (re-recording)	1994	—	—	—	—	—	—	—	79	—	—	A Carnival of Hits
"Far Shore"	1997	117	—	—	—	—	—	—	—	—	—	Future Road
"Calling Me Home"	1997	201	—	—	—	—	—	—	—	—	—	Future Road
"Carry Me"	2022	—	—	—	—	—	—	—	—	—	—	Carry Me (The Seekers 60th Anniversary)
"—" denotes releases that did not chart or were not released in that territory.
