= List of songs recorded by the Seekers =

This is a list of songs performed by the Australian pop / folk group the Seekers – on record and live in concert. It includes 144 songs in total.

== The Seekers ==
- Judith Durham – lead vocals, tambourine, maracas, piano, celeste, harpsichord, (autoharp - for one song)
- Athol Guy – bass-harmony vocals, acoustic double bass
- Keith Potger – high-harmony vocals, 12- & 6-string acoustic guitars, banjo. Also vocal arrangements for the group.
- Bruce Woodley – mid-harmony vocals, 6-string guitar, mandolin, banjo, (jaw's harp - for one song). Also the main songwriter of the group.

== Song list ==
Song title	Year recorded	The Seekers songwriters	The Seekers' co-songwriters	Other Songwriters / composers	Arranged / adapted by	Album	Label	Producer(s)	Length
A' Rovin'	1963	–	–	–	The Seekers				
All I Can Remember	1967	Keith Potger	–	–		Seekers Seen in Green	Columbia Records, EMI Music	Keith Grant/The Seekers	1:55
All My Trials	1963	–	–	–	The Seekers	Introducing the Seekers	W&G Records	Russ Thompson	3:30
All Over the World (Dans le monde entier)	1966	–	–	Françoise Hardy / Moore		Come the Day (a.k.a. Georgy Girl)	Columbia Records, Capitol Records, EMI Music	Tom Springfield	2:43
Allentown Jail	1965	–	–	Irving Gordon		A World of Our Own (a.k.a. The Seekers)	Columbia Records, EMI Music	Keith Grant	2:35
Amazing	1997	Bruce Woodley	Michael Cristiano	–	-	Future Road,	EMI Music	Charles Fisher	3:16
Angeline Is Always Friday	1967	Bruce Woodley	Tom Paxton	–		Seekers Seen in Green	Columbia Records, EMI Music	Keith Grant/The Seekers	2:40
Australia Land of Today	–	Judith Durham	–	–					
Blow the Man Down	1963	–	–	–	The Seekers				
Blowin' in the Wind	1964	–	–	Bob Dylan		Hide & Seekers (a.k.a. The Four & Only Seekers)	W&G Records	Keith Grant	2:26
Building Bridges	1991	Bruce Woodley	–	–					
The Bush Girl	1997	Bruce Woodley	–	Henry Lawson (words)	-	Future Road	EMI Music	Charles Fisher	4:58
California Dreamin'	1966	–	–	John Phillips / Michelle Phillips		Come the Day (a.k.a. Georgy Girl)	Columbia Records, Capitol Records, EMI Music	Tom Springfield	2:29
Calling Me Home	1997	Judith Durham	Jeff Vincent	–	--	Future Road	EMI Music	Charles Fisher	3.41
Can We Learn to Get Along	1976	Bruce Woodley	–	–					
Can't Make Up My Mind	1967	Judith Durham	David Reilly	–		Seekers Seen in Green	Columbia Records, EMI Music	Keith Grant/The Seekers	2:18
The Carnival Is Over	1965	–	–	Tom Springfield (melody from a Russian folk song)					
Carry Me	2022	Bruce Woodley	–	–	–			Michael Cristiano	4.17
Chase a Rainbow (Follow Your Dream)	1967	Bruce Woodley	–	–		Seekers Seen in Green	Columbia Records, EMI Music	Keith Grant/The Seekers	2:28
Children Go Where I Send You	1963	–	–	–	The Seekers				
Chilly Winds	1963	–	–	–	Keith Potger	Introducing the Seekers	W&G Records	Russ Thompson	2:34
Chilly Winds	1964	–	–	–	Keith Potger	Hide & Seekers (a.k.a. The Four & Only Seekers)	W&G Records	Keith Grant	2:00
The Circle of Love	1997	Keith Potger	Rick Beresford	–	-	Future Road	EMI Music	Charles Fisher	3:06
Cloudy	1967	Bruce Woodley	Paul Simon	–		Seekers Seen in Green	Columbia Records, EMI Music	Keith Grant/The Seekers	2:19
Colours of My Life	1967	Judith Durham	David Reilly	–		Seekers Seen in Green	Columbia Records, EMI Music	Keith Grant/The Seekers	2:35
Come the Day	1966	Bruce Woodley	–	–		Come the Day (a.k.a. Georgy Girl)	Columbia Records, Capitol Records, EMI Music	Tom Springfield	2:16
Cotton Fields	1964	–	–	Huddie Ledbetter (Lead Belly)	The Seekers	The Seekers (a.k.a. Roving With The Seekers)	W&G Records	Keith Grant	2:52
Danny Boy	1964	–	–	Traditional melody Frederic Weatherly (lyrics)	The Seekers	The Seekers (a.k.a. Roving With The Seekers)	W&G Records	Keith Grant	3:03
Days of My Life	1968	–	–	Tony Romeo					
Dese Bones G'wine Rise Again	1963	–	–	–	The Seekers	Introducing the Seekers	W&G Records	Russ Thompson	3:30
Devoted to You	1993	–	–	Felice Bryant / Boudleaux Bryant	-	25 Year Reunion Celebration Live In Concert	EMI Music	Michael Cristiano	2:27
Don't Tell Me My Mind	1965	Bruce Woodley	–	–		A World of Our Own (a.k.a. The Seekers)	Columbia Records, EMI Music	Keith Grant	2:14
Don't Think Twice It's Alright	1965	–	–	Bob Dylan		A World of Our Own (a.k.a. The Seekers)	Columbia Records, EMI Music	Tom Springfield	3:02
Study War No More (Down By The Riverside)	1968	–	–	–	The Seekers				
Eddystone Light	1963	–	–	–	The Seekers				
Emerald City	1967	Keith Potger (lyrics) under the pseudonym of John Martin	Kim Fowley	Melody "Ode to Joy"; Ludwig van Beethoven					
Eriskay Love Lilt	1964	–	–	Marjory Kennedy-Fraser		Hide & Seekers (a.k.a. The Four & Only Seekers)	W&G Records	Keith Grant	2:34
Far Shore	1997	–	–	Harry Vanda / George Young	-	Treasure Chest	EMI Music	Charles Fisher	3:27
59th Street Bridge Song (Feeling Groovy)	1967	–	–	Paul Simon		Seekers Seen in Green	Columbia Records, EMI Music	Keith Grant/The Seekers	2:19
Five Hundred Miles	1964	–	–	Hedy West		The Seekers (a.k.a. Roving With The Seekers)	W&G Records	Keith Grant	1:46
Forever Isn't Long Enough (For Me)	1997	Keith Potger	Byron Hill	–	-	Future Road	EMI Music	Charles Fisher	3:04
Four Strong Winds	1965	–	–	Ian Tyson		A World of Our Own (a.k.a. The Seekers)	Columbia Records, EMI Music	Keith Grant	3:22
Future Road	1997	Keith Potger	Trevor Spencer / Boyd Wilson	–	-	Future Road	EMI Music	Charles Fisher	3:54
Georgy Girl	1966	–	–	Tom Springfield / Jim Dale		Come the Day (a.k.a. Georgy Girl)	Columbia Records, Capitol Records, EMI Music	Tom Springfield	2:24
Gotta Love Someone	1997	Bruce Woodley	Michael Cristiano	–	-	Future Road	EMI Music	Charles Fisher	3:18
Gotta Travel On	1964	–	–	Paul Clayton		The Seekers (a.k.a. Roving With The Seekers)	W&G Records	Keith Grant	2:32
Guardian Angel / Guiding Light	1997	Keith Potger	–	–	-	Future Road	EMI Music	Charles Fisher	2:32
Hello Mary Lou	1968	–	–	Gene Pitney	-	Live at the Talk of the Town	EMI Music	Mickie Most	2:03
Here I Am	1988	Keith Potger	–	–					
High Barbary	1963	–	–	–	The Seekers				
House of Cards	1988	Bruce Woodley	Fred Koller	–					
How Can a Love So Wrong Be So Right	1991	Bruce Woodley	–	–					
I Am Australian	1993	Bruce Woodley	Dobe Newton	–	-	25 Year Reunion Celebration Live In Concert	EMI Music	Michael Cristiano	4:30
I Wish You Could Be Here	1966	Bruce Woodley	Paul Simon	–		Come the Day (a.k.a. Georgy Girl)	Columbia Records, Capitol Records, EMI Music	Tom Springfield	2:20
If I Had a Hammer (a.k.a. The Hammer Song)	1963	–	–	Pete Seeger / Lee Hays	–	Introducing the Seekers	W&G Records	Russ Thompson	2:53
If You Go Away	1967	–	–	Jacques Brel / Rod McKuen		Seekers Seen in Green	Columbia Records, EMI Music	Keith Grant/The Seekers	4:02
I'll Never Find Another You	1964	–	–	Tom Springfield					
In My Life	2012	–	–	John Lennon / Paul McCartney	-	The Golden Jubilee Album	EMI Music	Michael Cristiano	3:38
Isa Lei (Fijian Farewell)	1964	–	–	–	The Seekers	The Seekers (a.k.a. Roving With The Seekers)	W&G Records	Keith Grant	3:39
Island of Dreams	1966	–	–	Tom Springfield		Come the Day (a.k.a. Georgy Girl)	Columbia Records, Capitol Records, EMI Music	Tom Springfield	2:32
It Doesn't Matter Anymore	1997	–	–	Paul Anka	-	Future Road	EMI Music	Charles Fisher	3:00
It's Hard to Leave	1997	Judith Durham	–	–	-	Future Road	EMI Music	Charles Fisher	3:59
Just a Closer Walk With Thee	1965	–	–	–	The Seekers	A World of Our Own (a.k.a. The Seekers)	Columbia Records, EMI Music	Tom Springfield	3:19
Katy Kline	1963	–	–	–	The Seekers	Introducing the Seekers	W&G Records	Russ Thompson	2:20
Keep A Dream In Your Pocket	1992	Bruce Woodley	–	–	-	The Silver Jubilee Album	EMI Music	Ern Rose	3:16
Kumbaya	1963	–	–	–	The Seekers	Introducing the Seekers	W&G Records	Russ Thompson	3:00
Kumbaya	1964	–	–	–	The Seekers	Hide & Seekers (a.k.a. The Four & Only Seekers)	W&G Records	Keith Grant	2:25
Lady Mary	1964	–	–	–	Judith Durham	Hide & Seekers (a.k.a. The Four & Only Seekers)	W&G Records	Keith Grant	3:21
The Last Thing on My Mind	1966	–	–	Tom Paxton		Come the Day (a.k.a. Georgy Girl)	Columbia Records, Capitol Records, EMI Music	Tom Springfield	3:18
The Last Thing On My Mind	2019	-	-	Tom Paxton	-	Back to Our Roots	Fanfare	Michael Cristiano	4:27
Leave Her Johnny, Leave Her	1963	–	–	–	The Seekers				
Leaving of Liverpool	1965	–	–	–	The Clancy Brothers	A World of Our Own (a.k.a. The Seekers)	Columbia Records, EMI Music	Tom Springfield	2:57
Lemon Tree	1964	–	–	–	Will Holt	The Seekers (a.k.a. Roving With The Seekers)	W&G Records	Keith Grant	3:27
Let the Light from the Lighthouse Shine on Me	1963	–	–	–	The Seekers	Introducing the Seekers	W&G Records	Russ Thompson	2:40
Little Moses	1963	–	–	–	Judith Durham				
Live On	1988	Bruce Woodley	Robyn Payne	–					
Lonesome Traveller	1963	–	–	Lee Hays	–	Introducing the Seekers	W&G Records	Russ Thompson	2:35
Louisiana Man	1966	–	–	Doug Kershaw		Come the Day (a.k.a. Georgy Girl)	Columbia Records, Capitol Records, EMI Music	Tom Springfield	2:34
Louisiana Man	2019	-	-	Doug Kershaw	-	Back to Our Roots	Fanfare	Michael Cristiano	3:29
Love Is Kind, Love is Wine	1967	Bruce Woodley	–	–		Seekers Seen in Green	Columbia Records, EMI Music	Keith Grant/The Seekers	2:21
Love Is Me Love is You	1988	Bruce Woodley	Robyn Payne	–					
Maple Leaf Rag/Sweet Adeline/Medley	1968	–	–	Richard Gerard/Harry Armstrong & Scott Joplin	-	Live at the Talk of the Town	EMI Music	Mickie Most	3:23
Massachusetts	2003	–	–	Barry Gibb / Maurice Gibb / Robin Gibb	-	The Ultimate Collection	EMI Music	Michael Cristiano	2:51
Morningtown Ride	1964	–	–	Malvina Reynolds		Hide & Seekers (a.k.a. The Four & Only Seekers)	W&G Records	Keith Grant	2:35
Music of the World A Turnin'	1968	–	–	E. Levitt / Thomas					
Myra	1963	The Seekers	–	–					
New World in the Morning	1970s	–	–	Buddy England					
Nobody Knows the Trouble I've Seen	1966	–	–	–	The Seekers				
The Olive Tree	1967	–	–	Tom Springfield / Diane Lampert					
On the Other Side	1967	–	–	Tom Springfield / Gary Osbourne / Bob Sage		Seekers Seen in Green	Columbia Records, EMI Music	Keith Grant/The Seekers	2:11
One Step Forward, Two Steps Back	1988	Bruce Woodley	Ralph Murphy	–					
One World Love	1993	Judith Durham	John Young	–	-	The Silver Jubilee Album	EMI Music	Ern Rose	3:08
Open Up Them Pearly Gates	1964	–	–	–	The Seekers				
Ox Driving Song	1964	–	–	–	The Seekers	Hide & Seekers (a.k.a. The Four & Only Seekers)	W&G Records	Keith Grant	1:44
Paper Bird	1967	–	–	Unknown	-	-	EMI Music	Keith Grant/The Seekers	2:21
Plaisir d'Amour	1964	–	–	Jean-Paul-Égide Martini		The Seekers (a.k.a. Roving With The Seekers)	W&G Records	Keith Grant	2:46
Puff, the Magic Dragon	2002	–	–	Leonard Lipton / Peter Yarrow	-	Night of Nights... Live!	EMI Music	Michael Cristiano	2:58
Rattler	1967	Bruce Woodley	–	–		Seekers Seen in Green	Columbia Records, EMI Music	Keith Grant/The Seekers	2:51
Red Rubber Ball	1966	Bruce Woodley	Paul Simon	–		Come the Day (a.k.a. Georgy Girl)	Columbia Records, Capitol Records, EMI Music	Tom Springfield	2:17
Run Come See	1963	–	–	–	The Seekers	Introducing the Seekers	W&G Records	Russ Thompson	2:15
The Sad Cloud	1967	Bruce Woodley	–	–		Seekers Seen in Green	Columbia Records, EMI Music	Keith Grant/The Seekers	3:00
The Shores of Avalon	1997	The Seekers	John Kovac	–	-	Future Road	EMI Music	Charles Fisher	3:59
Silver Threads and Golden Needles	2012	–	–	Jack Rhodes / Dick Reynolds	-	The Golden Jubilee Album	EMI Music	Michael Cristiano	2:27
Sinner Man	1965	–	–	–	The Seekers				
Someday, One Day	1966	–	–	Paul Simon					
South Australia	1964	–	–	–	The Seekers	The Seekers (a.k.a. Roving With The Seekers)	W&G Records	Keith Grant	2:01
Sparrow Song	1975	Bruce Woodley	–	–					
Speak to the Sky	1997	–	–	Rick Springfield	-	Future Road	EMI Music	Charles Fisher	3:36
The Streets of Serenade	1991	Bruce Woodley	–	–					
Sweet Adeline/Maple Leaf Rag//Medley	1968	–	–	Scott Joplin & Richard Gerard/Harry Armstrong	-	Live at the Talk of the Town	EMI Music	Mickie Most	3:23
Sweet Surrender	1975	–	–	John Denver					
Taking My Chances With You	1988	Bruce Woodley	Fred Koller	–					
Ten Thousand Years Ago	2000	–	–	–	-	Night of Nights... Live!	EMI Music	Michael Cristiano	3:55
This Is My Song	1967	–	–	Charlie Chaplin	-	-	EMI Music	Keith Grant/The Seekers	2:53
This Land Is Your Land	1965	–	–	Woody Guthrie		A World of Our Own (a.k.a. The Seekers)	Columbia Records, EMI Music	Tom Springfield	2:33
This Little Light of Mine	1964	–	–	–	The Seekers	Hide & Seekers (a.k.a. The Four & Only Seekers)	W&G Records	Keith Grant	2:15
This Train	1963	–	–	–	The Seekers	Introducing the Seekers	W&G Records	Russ Thompson	3:00
Time and Again	1993	Bruce Woodley	–	–	-	25 Year Reunion Celebration Live In Concert	EMI Music	Michael Cristiano	3:49
The Times They Are a-Changin'	1965	–	–	Bob Dylan		A World of Our Own (a.k.a. The Seekers)	Columbia Records, EMI Music	Tom Springfield	2:32
Turn! Turn! Turn!	1966	–	–	Pete Seeger		Come the Day (a.k.a. Georgy Girl)	Columbia Records, Capitol Records, EMI Music	Tom Springfield	3:16
Two Summers	1965	Bruce Woodley	–	–		A World of Our Own (a.k.a. The Seekers)	Columbia Records, EMI Music	Tom Springfield	2:45
Walk With Me	1966	–	–	Tom Springfield					
Waltzing Matilda (Traditional version)	1963	–	–	Banjo Paterson (words); M. Cowan (melody)	The Seekers				
Waltzing Matilda (Queensland version)	1964	–	–	Banjo Paterson (words) (melody) composer ?		The Seekers (a.k.a. Roving With The Seekers)	W&G Records	Keith Grant	2:54
The Water Is Wide	1964	–	–	–	The Seekers	Hide & Seekers (a.k.a. The Four & Only Seekers)	W&G Records	Keith Grant	3:52
We Shall Not Be Moved	1965	–	–	–	The Seekers				
Well Well Well	1964	–	–	Bob Gibson, Bob Camp		Hide & Seekers (a.k.a. The Four & Only Seekers)	W&G Records	Keith Grant	2:34
Well Well Well	1966	–	–	Bob Gibson, Bob Camp		Come the Day (a.k.a. Georgy Girl)	Columbia Records, Capitol Records, EMI Music	Tom Springfield	2:28
We're Moving On	1964	–	–	–	The Seekers	Hide & Seekers (a.k.a. The Four & Only Seekers)	W&G Records	Keith Grant	2:02
What Have They Done to the Rain?	1964	–	–	Malvina Reynolds		Hide & Seekers (a.k.a. The Four & Only Seekers)	W&G Records	Keith Grant	2:27
When the Stars Begin to Fall	1963	–	–	–	The Seekers	Introducing the Seekers	W&G Records	Russ Thompson	4:00
When Will The Good Apples Fall	1967	–	–	Kenny Young					
Whisky in the Jar	1964	–	–	–	The Seekers	The Seekers (a.k.a. Roving With The Seekers)	W&G Records	Keith Grant	3:11
Whistlin' Rufus	1965	–	–	Mills / Cooley / Smith					
Gypsy Rover a.k.a. The Whistling Gypsy	1964	–	–	–	The Seekers	The Seekers (a.k.a. Roving With The Seekers)	W&G Records	Keith Grant	2:42
Wild Rover	1963	–	–	–	The Seekers	Introducing the Seekers	W&G Records	Russ Thompson	2:20
With My Swag All On My Shoulder	1964	–	–	–	The Seekers	The Seekers (a.k.a. Roving With The Seekers)	W&G Records	Keith Grant	1:53
A World of Our Own	1965	–	–	Tom Springfield		A World of Our Own (a.k.a. The Seekers)	Columbia Records, EMI Music	Tom Springfield	2:38
Wreck of the Old '97	1964	–	–	–	The Seekers	The Seekers (a.k.a. Roving With The Seekers)	W&G Records	Keith Grant	3:08
Yesterday	1966	–	–	John Lennon / Paul McCartney		Come the Day (a.k.a. Georgy Girl)	Columbia Records, Capitol Records, EMI Music	Tom Springfield	2:27
You Can Tell The World	1965	–	–	Bob Gibson / Hamilton Camp		A World of Our Own (a.k.a. The Seekers)	Columbia Records, EMI Music	Keith Grant	2:13
You're My Spirit	1993	Keith Potger / Athol Guy	–	–	-	25 Year Reunion Celebration Live In Concert	EMI Music	Michael Cristiano	2:26

== Notes ==
Further information about the songs, which were written (or co-written) by Bruce William Woodley, can be found at the following websites:
