= The Seekers Complete =

Box set by The Seekers
- Released: 18 December 1995
- Recorded: 1963–1994
- Genre: Folk, pop, world, folk-rock, easy listening
- Length: 323:50
- Label: EMI Music Australia

The Seekers chronology
This is the Seekers (1994)	The Seekers Complete (1995)	Treasure Chest (1997)

The Seekers Complete is a 5-disc box set by Australian band The Seekers. It was released in December 1995 following the group's induction into the ARIA Hall of Fame at the ARIA Music Awards of 1995.

== Reception ==
Bruce Eder from AllMusic wrote, "The set is broken up into five volumes, the first (1963–1964) covering the group's early history: their original 12-song demo, coupled with parts of their debut Australian album, Introducing the Seekers. The music is a mix of traditional Australian, English, and American folk songs spiced with American gospel. They do themselves credit, whether they're touching on familiar folk standards or Australian repertory, all displaying a beguiling purity and infectious joy in the singing. The second (1964–1965) and third (1966–1967) discs cover their album tracks from the group's classic era, from early 1964 up to the end of their last full year of success in 1967. The sources for those 40 songs are impeccable, although this is also the period already covered well by various hits anthologies. The fourth, "Hits, B-sides, and the '90's," pushes the group's hit singles, starting with "I'll Never Find Another You" and ending with "Days of My Life" onto a separate disc. The eight 1990s tracks, cut in the studio and in concert on the Seekers' reunion tour, show the group still singing strongly, if not quite as agilely. Disc Five, "Studio and Concert Rarities," offers live tracks from their return to Australia as stars in 1965. Each disc comes with separate notes, which are generally informative and helpful."

== Omissions ==
- Seven tracks from the 1963 first album, Introducing the Seekers, were not included, apparently so as to avoid duplication of songs already represented by Audition Tape track versions.
- The 1966 track, I Wish You Could Be Here, written by Bruce Woodley and Paul Simon, from the Come the Day album, was peculiarly omitted from the collection.
- The 1994 re-recordings of A World of Our Own and Georgy Girl were omitted, though a B-side (Keep A Dream In Your Pocket), newly recorded for one of the single releases, is included.
- The collection does not include any material from the albums released by the band during the 1970s and 1980s following the departure of Judith Durham.

== Track listing ==
CD1 (1963–1964)

1. "With My Swag All On My Shoulder"
2. "Children Go Where I Send You"
3. "South Australia"
4. "Waltzing Matilda"
5. "Little Moses"
6. "Wild Rover"
7. "Dese Bones G'wine Rise Again"
8. "When The Stars Begin To Fall"
9. "This Train"
10. "All My Trials"
11. "The Light from the Lighthouse"
12. "Chilly Winds"
13. "Kumbaya"
14. "Run Come See"
15. "The Hammer Song"
16. "Katy Kline"
17. "Lonesome Traveller"
18. "Myra" (W&G Version)
19. "The Wreck Of The Old '97"
20. "Danny Boy"
21. "Waltzing Matilda" (Queensland Version)
22. "Cotton Fields"
23. "Lemon Tree"
24. "Gotta Travel On"
25. "With My Swag All On My Shoulder"
26. "Plaisir d'amour"

Tracks 8 and 14-17 are taken from the album Introducing the Seekers.

Tracks 19 to 26 are taken from The Seekers

CD2 (1964–1965)

1. "Isa Lei"
2. "Whiskey in the Jar"
3. "500 Miles"
4. "Gypsy Rover"
5. "South Australia"
6. "This Little Light of Mine"
7. "Morningtown Ride" (World Record Club Version)
8. "The Water is Wide"
9. "Well Well Well" (World Record Club Version)
10. "Lady Mary"
11. "We're Moving On"
12. "Ox Driving Song"
13. "Kumbaya" (World Record Club Version)
14. "Blowin' in the Wind"
15. "Eriskay Love Lilt"
16. "Chilly Winds" (World Record Club Version)
17. "What Have They Done to the Rain?"
18. "Don't Think Twice, It's All Right"
19. "The Leaving of Liverpool"
20. "This Land Is Your Land"
21. "Two Summers"
22. "The Times They are a Changin'"
23. "Just a Closer Walk with Thee"
24. "Don't Tell Me My Mind"
25. "Allentown Jail"
26. "Four Strong Winds"
27. "You Can Tell the World"
28. "Whistlin' Rufus"

Tracks 1 to 5 comprise the remainder of The Seekers.

Tracks 6 to 17 are the entirety of the album Hide & Seekers.

Tracks 18 to 27 comprise the entirety of the album A World of Our Own, less the title track.

CD3 (1966–1967)

1. "Yesterday"
2. "The Last Thing on My Mind"
3. "Red Rubber Ball"
4. "Well Well Well" (EMI Version)
5. "Come the Day"
6. "All Over the World (Dans Le Monde En Entier)"
7. "Island of Dreams"
8. "Turn Turn Turn"
9. "Louisiana Man"
10. "California Dreamin'"
11. "Love Is Kind, Love Is Wine"
12. "The Sad Cloud"
13. "The 59th Street Bridge Song (Feelin' Groovy)"
14. "If You Go Away"
15. "All I Can Remember"
16. "Chase a Rainbow (Follow Your Dream)"
17. "Angeline is Always Friday"
18. "On the Other Side"
19. "Cloudy"
20. "Can't Make Up My Mind"
21. "Rattler"
22. "Colours of My Life"

Tracks 1 to 10 are the album Come the Day, less Georgy Girl and I Wish You Could Be Here. Tracks 11 to 22 are the entirety of the album Seekers Seen in Green.

CD4 (Hits, B-Sides & The 90s)

1. "I'll Never Find Another You"
2. "Open Up Them Pearly Gates"
3. "A World of Our Own"
4. "Sinner Man"
5. "The Carnival Is Over"
6. "We Shall Not Be Moved"
7. "Someday, One Day"
8. "Nobody Knows the Trouble I've Seen"
9. "Walk with Me"
10. "We're Movin' On"
11. "Morningtown Ride"
12. "When The Stars Begin to Fall"
13. "Georgy Girl"
14. "When Will the Good Apples Fall?"
15. "Myra"
16. "Emerald City"
17. "Music of the World a Turnin'"
18. "Days of My Life"
19. "Study War No More (Down By The Riverside)"
20. "Keep A Dream In Your Pocket"
21. "One World Love"
22. "You're My Spirit"
23. "Devoted to You"
24. "Time and Again"
25. "I Am Australian"
26. "Puff (The Magic Dragon)"
27. "Waltzing Matilda"

CD5 (Studio & Concert Rarities)

1. "You Can Tell the World" {Live} – 3:24
2. "Blowin' in the Wind" {Live} – 2:38
3. "Kumbaya (trad.) {Live} – 2:31
4. "This Little Light of Mine" {Live} – 2:39
5. "Don't Think Twice It's Alright" {Live} – 2:25
6. "Stan Rofe-Gold Record Presentation" {Live} – 2:00
7. "Cotton Fields" {Live} – 2:04
8. "3AK Jingle" – 0:35
9. "3AK Jingle" – 0:20
10. "3AK Jingle" – 0:18
11. "Blow the Man Down" {Live} – 2:35
12. "South Australia" {Live} – 1:36
13. "High Barbary" {Live} – 2:19
14. "Eddystone Light" {Live} – 1:21
15. "Leave Her Johnny, Leave Her" {Live} – 2:19
16. "A' Rovin'" {Live} – 2:29
17. "This Is My Song" {Live} – 2:52
18. "Hello Mary Lou" – 2:01
19. "Sweet Adeline" – 1:43
20. "Maple Leaf Rag" – 1:37
21. "The Olive Tree" – 2:25
22. "Georgy Girl" [Film Version A] – 2:20
23. "Georgy Girl" – 1:36

== Chart positions ==
Chart (1995/96)	Peak position
Australian Albums (ARIA)	17

== Certification ==
Region	Certification	Certified units/sales
Australia (ARIA)	Gold	35,000^{^}
^{^} Shipments figures based on certification alone.
