= Athol Guy =

Australian musician and politician

Athol Guy AO
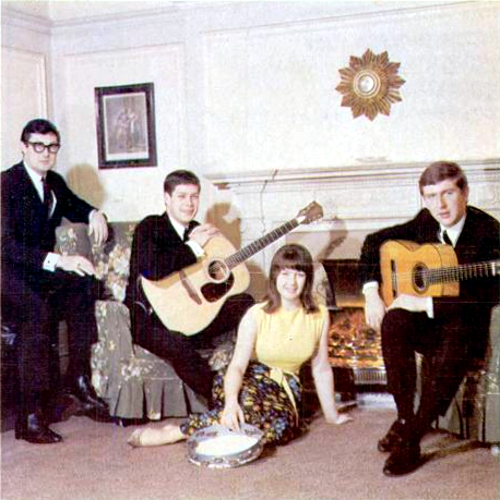
- The Seekers in 1965 – Guy at left

Member of the Victorian Legislative Assembly for Gisborne
- In office 11 December 1971 – 5 March 1979
- Preceded by: Julian Doyle
- Succeeded by: Tom Reynolds

Personal details
- Born: Athol George Guy; 5 January 1940 (age 86) Colac, Victoria, Australia
- Party: Liberal
- Occupation: Musician, politician
- Website: atholguyandfriends.com
- Musical career
- Origin: Melbourne, Victoria, Australia
- Genres: Folk; pop; gospel
- Instruments: Double bass, vocals
- Years active: 1960s–present

Athol George Guy is an Australian musician and former politician who was a member of the Australian folk-pop music group the Seekers, for whom he played double bass and sang. He is recognisable by his black-framed "Buddy Holly" style glasses and, during live performances, often acted as the group's compère.

== Early life ==
Athol George Guy was born on 5 January 1940 in Colac, Victoria, the son of George Francis Guy (RAN) and Doris Thelma (née Cole) Guy. Guy's father served in the navy, and Guy states he rarely saw him. Guy was educated at Gardenvale Central School, where he was school captain. He entered Melbourne High School, where he was twice under age athletic champion and an officer in the cadet corps. During this time he was Victorian Sub Junior High Jump Champion and then silver medallist to Olympian Colin Ridgway the next year.

== Music ==
=== The Seekers ===
Guy formed his first musical group in 1958, the Ramblers, resulting in his move into performance, marketing and production at GTV9. Progressing via HSV7, media manager with the Clemenger Group and account exec with J. Walter Thompson, he then set sail with the folk-pop and gospel group the Seekers for 10 weeks' holiday abroad. The group was composed of him, Bruce Woodley, Keith Potger, and trad-jazz singer Judith Durham. On his return he established his own consulting company and compèred two national TV shows.

The Seekers would have many hits during the 1960s including "I'll Never Find Another You", "A World of Our Own", "The Carnival Is Over" and "Georgy Girl"; all were written or co-written by Tom Springfield and were each awarded a gold disc. The Seekers have sold over 50 million records worldwide.

His opinion of the group is that they were "blessed" in many ways, and aided in revolutionizing the folk scene during their time together (both in their homeland and abroad). In a 2018 interview, Guy touched how the Seekers' music was unique and distinctive in the 60's, particularly when it came to the folk and gospel they popularised during the distinctly countercultural era - the interviewer saying: "Now I know that gospel songs were important to the folk scene at that time - before Dylan kind of revolutionised". Guy added: "I think we all came together musically with our own sense of, you know, the spiritual nature of music... (and) the effect music can have in your life and lives."

When the Seekers broke up in 1968 (due to Durham announcing her leave to pursue a solo career and start a family), Guy later joined the ensuing incarnations of the same, featuring the rotating line of lead singer replacements.

Guy has taken part in subsequent reunions of the Seekers since 1993, when they celebrated the silver jubilee of their 1968 break up. Since reforming again in 1988, and until 2022, Guy had continued to tour as a member of the Seekers, along with original members Keith Potger and Bruce Woodley.

=== Television host ===
When the Seekers disbanded in 1968, Guy hosted his own variety series — A Guy Called Athol — on Australia's Seven Network, and later the quiz show The Big 9 on the Nine Network. A guest on one episode of Big Nine was Hutton Gibson, father of actor Mel Gibson.

== Personal life ==
Guy is a widower, and had a daughter, Alissa Guy, with his wife. In an interview on May 6, 2015 he stated his daughter was his proudest achievement, and she was 35 at the time of the interview. About her, he also said: "She is progressing beautifully in life. Sadly, she lost her mum, my dear wife, about ten years ago. I’m so proud of the way she has handled her life."

He also has a granddaughter who was born in 2012. In 1996, he bought a West Rock farm, near Lancefield, west of Melbourne in 1996. He also breeds thoroughbred horses and grows grapes on a farm he purchased in 1994.

Guy is a Christian, and partnered with fellow seeker, Keith Potger, to write a gospel song for their live concerts, "You're My Spirit".

Guy had a step-sister, Annie Viergever. Viergever was the daughter of Jack Ransom, who went on to marry Guy's mother. She died along with her husband, Jaap Viergever, 64, and their 3 dogs in a housefire. At the time of her death, Guy stated she was in declining health.

As last known, Guy was reported to live in Mt. Macedon, near his now deceased sister's house.

== Politics ==
Guy was elected to the Victorian Legislative Assembly in a by-election on 11 December 1971 for Gisborne as a member of the Liberal Party. He served as a member of the assembly until resigning due to ill health on 5 March 1979. One of its youngest members, he won three terms with an increasing majority before he returned to the commercial world as a corporate consultant. His achievements included the government's purchase and development of Werribee Park.

== Business ==
Guy opted to return to the business world and rejoined the Clemenger group as general manager of Clemenger Harvie from 1979 to 1989. During the 1990s, Guy joined St George Bank's marketing team as business development consultant, and then AMP's financial planning group, Hillross. With the assistance of the St George foundation, Guy was instrumental in the Murdoch Institute introducing a genetic educational course into Victorian schools.

Alongside these roles, he accommodated the many hundreds of reunion concerts with the Seekers from 1993 to about 2015, effectively curtailing any further political ambitions. In recent years, Guy has been involved in a joint venture with Hanging Rock Winery, launching "Athol's Paddock" in the Macedon Ranges. The first vintage from Athol's Paddock was 1997 and since that time has regularly produced award-winning shiraz.

His community roles have included:

- Inaugural member: Children's Protection Society
- Current patron: Kids Under Cover
- Current patron: Riding For the Disabled.
- Current patron: Relay For Life.
- Current patron: Tee Up for Kids.
- Current patron: Sing Australia.
- Current ambassador: Heart Kids – RCH.
- Former chair: Daylesford Macedon Tourism Marketing
- Former chair: Tourism Macedon Ranges
- Former Macedon Memorial Cross trustee
- Current board: Living Legends
- Former Federal Ministers inaugural advisory board: Indigenous Tourism Australia

== Notable performances ==
- 1965 – The Seekers won the Best New Group in the New Musical Express Poll Winners Awards and performed on 11 April at the Wembley Empire Pool, on a bill that included the Beatles, the Rolling Stones, Cliff Richard and Dusty Springfield. Archive footage from this show was included in the Seekers' 2014 50th anniversary tour.
- 1965 – In June the Seekers performed in the United States on The Ed Sullivan Show singing "A World of Our Own" and "You Can Tell The World".
- 1966 – In November the Seekers performed at a Royal Command Performance at the London Palladium before the Queen Mother.
- 1967 – The Seekers made another appearance on The Ed Sullivan Show singing "Georgy Girl".
- 1967 – The Seekers represented Australia at Expo 67 in Montreal, Quebec, Canada (when they appeared on television in Australia via the first satellite transmission from the United States to Australia).
- 1967 – Melbourne, 12 March, Sidney Myer Music Bowl. The Seekers played to an estimated 200,000 people in a televised concert celebrating their overseas success.

== Television specials ==
- 1965 – An Evening with The Seekers
- 1966 – The Seekers at Home
- 1967 – The Seekers Down Under and The World of The Seekers
- Four television mini-specials titled A Date with the Seekers
- 1968 – 1968 BBC Farewell Spectacular
- 2019 – ABC Television's Australian Story
- 2019 – SBS Television screens the Decca DVD Farewell Album

== Honours and awards ==
- In 1966, the Seekers received the Carl Alan Award for Best New Group at the Top Of The Pops Awards, in London.
- In 1968, Guy and the other members of The Seekers were named jointly and severally Australians of the Year 1967.
- In the 1995 Australia Day Honours, Guy, along with the other members of The Seekers, was awarded the Medal of the Order of Australia (OAM).
- In 2006, Guy and the other members of The Seekers were presented with the Key to the City by Melbourne's Lord Mayor, John So.
- In 2012, Guy and the other members of the Seekers were honoured by Australia Post with a special Legends Of Australian Music postage stamp.
- In the 2014 Queen's Birthday Honours, Guy, along with the other members of The Seekers, was advanced as an Officer of the Order of Australia (AO).

== Discography ==
=== Albums ===
Title	Album details
Introducing the Seekers	Released: 1963; Label: W&G
The Seekers	Released: 1964; Label: W&G
Hide & Seekers	Released: 1964; Label: W&G
A World of Our Own	Released: 1965; Label: Columbia, EMI Music Australia
Come the Day	Released: September 1966; Label: Columbia, EMI
Seekers Seen in Green	Released: November 1967; Label: Columbia, EMi
The Seekers	Released: 1975; Label: Astor, Polydor
Giving and Taking	Released: July 1976; Label: Astor, Polydor
Live On	Released: March 1989; Label: Polydor Records
Future Road	Released: October 1997; Label: EMI Music Australia
Morningtown Ride to Christmas	Released: November 2001; Label: Sony Music Australia
Back to Our Roots	Released: June 2019; Label: Sony Music Australia

=== Live Albums ===
Title	Album details
Live at the Talk of the Town	Released: July 1968; Label: Columbia, EMI
25 Year Reunion Celebration	Released: November 1993; Label: EMI Music Australia
1968 BBC Farewell Spectacular	Released: November 1999; Label: Mushroom
Night of Nights... Live!	Released: 2002; Label: Mushroom
Farewell	Released: 12 April 2019; Label: Decca
The Carnival of Hits Tour 2000	Released: 23 August 2019; Label: Decca
Live in the UK	Released: 2 July 2021; Label: Decca

=== Singles ===
Title	Year
"Kumbaya"	1963
"Waltzing Matilda"	1963
"Myra"	1964
"I'll Never Find Another You"	1964
"What Have They Done to the Rain"	1965
"A World of Our Own"	1965
"Chilly Winds"	1965
"Morningtown Ride"	1965
"Cotton Fields"	1965
"The Carnival Is Over"	1965
"Lady Mary"	1965
"Someday, One Day"	1966
"Walk with Me"	1966
"Georgy Girl"	1966
"Isa Lei"	1966
"Myra (Shake Up the Party)"	1967
"On the Other Side"	1967
"When Will the Good Apples Fall"	1967
"Emerald City"	1967
"Love Is Kind, Love Is Wine"	1968
"Days of My Life"	1968
"With My Swag All on My Shoulder"	1968
"Island of Dreams"	1968
"Children Go Where I Send You"	1969
"Colours of My Life"	1969
"Sparrow Song"	1975
"Love Isn't Love Until You Give It Away"	1975
"Reunion"	1975
"Break These Chains"	1976
"A Part of You"	1976
"Where in the World"	1976
"Giving and Taking"	1976
"Vagabond"	1977
"How Can a Love So Wrong Be So Right"	1988
"Building Bridges"	1989
"Keep a Dream in Your Pocket"	1993
"A World of Our Own" (re-recording)	1994
"Georgy Girl" (re-recording)	1994
"Calling Me Home"	1997
"Carry Me"	2022
