= Treasure Chest (The Seekers album) =

Box set by The Seekers
- Released: 28 April 1997
- Recorded: 1967–1968, 1997
- Genre: Folk, pop, world, folk rock, easy listening
- Length: 123:53
- Label: EMI Music Australia

The Seekers chronology
The Seekers Complete (1995)	Treasure Chest (1997)	Future Road (1997)

Treasure Chest is a 3-disc box set by Australian band The Seekers. Disc one contains two new tracks and an interview. Disc two is their 1967 album, Seekers Seen in Green and disc three is their 1968 album, Live at the Talk of the Town. The album peaked at number 7 in Australia and was certified gold.

== Reception ==
Bruce Eder of AllMusic stated, "This triple-CD set is uneven, soaring (and scoring) high with new 1997 material and covering some important historical bases as well. [The disc] opens with one of the finest recordings the group has ever made, 1997's "Far Shore," written by ex-Easybeats' Harry Vanda and George Young. The group also does a good ecological anthem, "Hey Hey Hey," co-written by Durham, which gets into world music territory—her voice still has the same power it displayed 30 years ago, and the group still plays and sings well.

== Track listing ==
CD1 (new material)

1. "Far Shore" (Harry Vanda, George Young) - 3:29
2. "Hey Hey Hey" (Durham) - 3:35
3. "Graham Simpson Interview with the Seekers" - 37:16

CD2 (Seekers Seen in Green)

1. "Love Is Kind, Love Is Wine" (Bruce Woodley) - 2:28
2. "The Sad Cloud" (Clive Westlake, Bruce Woodley) - 2:55
3. "The 59th Street Bridge Song (Feelin' Groovy)" (Paul Simon) - 2:27
4. "If You Go Away" (Jacques Brel, Rod McKuen) - 4:05
5. "All I Can Remember" (Keith Potger) - 1:57
6. "Chase a Rainbow (Follow Your Dream)" (Bruce Woodley) - 2:26
7. "Angeline is Always Friday" (Tom Paxton, Bruce Woodley) - 2:44
8. "On the Other Side" (Gary Osborne, Bob Sage, Tom Springfield) - 2:17
9. "Cloudy" (Paul Simon, Bruce Woodley) - 2:18
10. "Can't Make Up My Mind" (Judith Durham, David Reilly) - 2:20
11. "Rattler" (Bruce Woodley) - 2:52
12. "Colours of My Life" (Judith Durham, David Reilly) - 2:34

CD3 (Live at the Talk of the Town)

1. "Music of the World a Turnin'" (Estelle Levitt, Don Thomas)
2. "I'll Never Find Another You" (Tom Springfield)
3. "With My Swag All On My Shoulder" (The Seekers)
4. "Hello Mary Lou" (Gene Pitney)
5. "I Wish You Could Be Here" (Bruce Woodley, Simon)
6. "We Shall Not Be Moved" (traditional)
7. "Morningtown Ride" (Reynolds)
8. "A World of Our Own" (Springfield)
9. "Rattler" (Woodley)
10. "The Olive Tree" (Tom Springfield, Diane Lampert)
11. "Colours of My Life" (Reilly, Durham)
12. "Ragtime Mix" "Sweet Adeline" / "Maple Leaf Rag" (Henry W. Armstrong, Richard Gerard, Scott Joplin, Russell, Styne)
13. "Angeline is Always Friday" (Woodley, Paxton)
14. "Love Is Kind, Love Is Wine" (Woodley)
15. "The Carnival is Over" (Patty Hill, Mildred J. Hill, Springfield)
16. "Georgy Girl" (Springfield, Dale)

== Chart positions ==
Chart (1997)	Peak position
Australian Albums (ARIA)	7

== Certifications ==
Region	Certification	Certified units/sales
Australia (ARIA)	Gold	35,000^{^}
^{^} Shipments figures based on certification alone.
