= The Golden Jubilee Album =

Greatest hits album by The Seekers
- Released: 16 November 2012
- Recorded: 1962–2012
- Genre: Folk, pop, world
- Label: EMI Music Australia

The Seekers chronology
Greatest Hits (2009)	The Golden Jubilee Album (2012)	Farewell (2019)

The Golden Jubilee Album is a compilation album by Australian band The Seekers. The album was released in November 2012, to celebrate 50 years since the group’s formation in 1962. This compilation includes two new tracks, a cover of Jack Rhodes and Dick Reynolds' "Silver Threads and Golden Needles" and The Beatles' "In My Life".

== Reception ==
Professional ratings
Review scores
Source	Rating
AllMusic	4/5 stars

Steve Leggett from AllMusic gave the album 4 out of 5 saying; "Australia's The Seekers have had a long career, one that began in the early 1960s, and five decades on, this two-disc, 50-track set appeared to celebrate the group's 50th anniversary. All the hits and essential sides are here, including "Georgy Girl," "A World of Our Own," and "I'll Never Find Another You," among others, as well as two new tracks unique to this set. The Seekers were never really an albums act, so what's truly essential is here, making this both a nice introduction and a fair high-point summation of the group's catalog."

== Track listing ==
CD1

1. "Silver Threads and Golden Needles" - 2:30
2. "In My Life" - 3:37
3. "Massachusetts" - 3:01
4. "Gotta Love Someone" - 3:20
5. "The Bush Girl" - 4:58
6. "Calling Me Home" - 3:40
7. "Guardian Angel"/"Guiding Light" - 2:32
8. "Forever Isn't Long Enough (For Me)" - 3:05
9. "The Shores of Avalon" - 4:00
10. "Far Shore" - 3:29
11. "I Am Australian" (live) - 4:32
12. "Keep a Dream in Your Pocket" - 3:18
13. "Days of My Life" - 2:48
14. "When Will the Good Apples Fall" - 2:28
15. "Emerald City" - 2:40
16. "Love Is Kind, Love Is Wine" - 2:29
17. "All I Can Remember" - 1:56
18. "Cloudy" - 2:16
19. "The Sad Cloud" - 2:55
20. "Colours of My Life" - 2:36
21. "Come the Day" - 2:13
22. "Red Rubber Ball" - 2:14
23. "Louisiana Man" - 2:31
24. "Turn! Turn! Turn!" - 3:15
25. "California Dreamin'" - 2:30

CD2

1. "Georgy Girl" - 2:22
2. "Island of Dreams" - 2:30
3. "Well Well Well" (with Bobby Richards & His Orchestra) - 2:33
4. "When the Stars Begin to Fall" - 3:09
5. "Morningtown Ride" - 2:41
6. "Someday, One Day" - 2:33
7. "Nobody Knows the Trouble I've Seen" - 2:27
8. "Walk With Me" - 3:05
9. "The Carnival is Over" - 3:12
10. "A World of Our Own" - 2:44
11. "Just a Closer Walk with Thee" - 3:21
12. "The Leaving of Liverpool" - 2:54
13. "We Shall Not Be Moved" - 2:24
14. "Don't Think Twice, It's All Right" - 3:06
15. "The Wreck of the Old 97" - 3:12
16. "With My Swag All on My Shoulder" - 1:54
17. "Whiskey in the Jar" - 2:22
18. "This Little Light of Mine" (with Bobby Richards & His Orchestra) - 2:17
19. "Danny Boy" - 3:04
20. "Kumbaya" - 2:32
21. "Lady Mary" (with Bobby Richards & His Orchestra) - 3:25
22. "What Have They Done to the Rain" (with Bobby Richards & His Orchestra) - 2:26
23. "I'll Never Find Another You" - 2:42
24. "Open Up Them Pearly Gates" - 2:15
25. "Myra" - 2:00

== Charts ==
=== Weekly charts ===
Chart (2012–2015)	Peak position
Australian Albums (ARIA)	10
New Zealand Albums (RMNZ)	2

=== Year-end charts ===
Chart (2012)	Position
Australian Albums (ARIA)	58
Chart (2013)	Position
Australian Artist Albums (ARIA)	32
Chart (2014)	Position
New Zealand Albums (RMNZ)	16

== Certifications ==
Region	Certification	Certified units/sales
Australia (ARIA)	Gold	35,000^{^}
New Zealand (RMNZ)	Platinum	15,000^{^}
^{^} Shipments figures based on certification alone.

== Release history ==
Region	Date	Format	Label	Catalogue
Australia/New Zealand	16 November 2012	CD, digital download	EMI Music Australia	7212122
