= 1968 BBC Farewell Spectacular =

Live album (reissue) by Judith Durham and The Seekers
- Released: November 1999
- Recorded: The Talk of the Town, London July 7, 1968
- Genre: Pop, folk, world
- Label: Mushroom Records
- Producer: Mickie Most

Judith Durham albums chronology
| Future Road (1997) | 1968 BBC Farewell Spectacular (1999) | Hold On to Your Dream (2000) |

The Seekers chronology
| The Very Best of The Seekers (1998) | 1968 BBC Farewell Spectacular (1999) | Morningtown Ride to Christmas (2001) |

1968 BBC Farewell Spectacular is a live album credited to Judith Durham and The Seekers. The album is a recording of their final performance together, recorded and televised by the BBC. The track list and show is largely the same as the 1968 release Live at the Talk of the Town, recorded a week earlier. The album was issued on CD 1999 on Mushroom Records and peaked at number 12 in Australia in April 2000.

The concert was the last time the original members performed together until 1993.

== Reception ==
Richie Unterberger, in his review for AllMusic, wrote: "In July 1968, the Seekers did an official farewell concert for BBC television. While this 18-song television special was well filmed and well performed, it might be a bit of a letdown for Seekers fans who value the group for the pop-folk style for which they were most famous. For it is presented as something of a variety show in which the quartet sing tunes in several styles, including traditional Australian folk, jazz, rock & roll and even a ragtime piano solo spot for Judith Durham ("Maple Leaf Rag"). You'll also have to put up with some obviously carefully scripted and rehearsed between-song comedy routines that are somewhat amusing, but pretty corny. On the other hand, this does have quality non-mimed performances in the closely harmonized pop-folk vein that was their forte."

== Track listing ==
Side A

1. "Music of the World a Turnin'" (Estelle Levitt, Don Thomas)
2. "I'll Never Find Another You" (Tom Springfield)
3. "With My Swag All On My Shoulder" (The Seekers)
4. "Hello Mary Lou" (Gene Pitney)
5. "I Wish You Could Be Here" (Bruce Woodley, Simon)
6. "We Shall Not Be Moved" (traditional)
7. "Morningtown Ride" (Reynolds)
8. "A World of Our Own" (Springfield)
9. "Rattler" (Woodley)
10. "The Olive Tree" (Tom Springfield, Diane Lampert)
11. "Colours of My Life" (Reilly, Durham)
12. "Sweet Adeline" (Henry W. Armstrong, Richard Gerard)
13. "Maple Leaf Rag" (Scott Joplin, Russell, Styne)
14. "Angeline is Always Friday" (Woodley, Paxton)
15. "Love Is Kind, Love Is Wine" (Woodley)
16. "Georgy Girl" (Springfield, Dale)
17. "The Carnival Is Over" (Springfield)
18. "Georgy Girl" (Reprise)

== Charts ==
| Chart (1999/2000) | Peak position |
|---|---|
| Australian Albums (ARIA) | 12 |

== Certification ==
| Region | Certification | Certified units/sales |
|---|---|---|
| Australia (ARIA) | Gold | 35,000^{^} |
^{^} Shipments figures based on certification alone.

== See also ==
- Live at the Talk of the Town (1968)
