= Robert Whitaker (photographer) =

British photographer (1939–2011)

- Born: 13 November 1939
- Died: 20 September 2011 (aged 71)
- Known for: Photography
- Website: robertwhitakerphotography.com

Robert Whitaker (13 November 1939 – 20 September 2011) was a British photographer, best known internationally for imagery of The Beatles taken between 1964 and 1966, including the "Butcher Cover", controversially removed the band's 1966's US-only album Yesterday and Today. He also worked with the rock group Cream, photos from which were used in the Martin Sharp-designed collage on the cover of their 1967 LP Disraeli Gears.

== Biography ==
=== Early life and career ===
Robert Whitaker was born in Harpenden, Hertfordshire, to a British mother and an Australian father on 13 November 1939, later referring to himself as "one part Aussie lad" since his grandfather was also Australian. According to Whitaker, his grandfather built the Princes Bridge in Melbourne. Although he worked mostly in Britain, Australia and Australian connections featured significantly in his life and career. His parents encouraged his interest in art and photography. Fascinated by the work of Salvador Dalí, at sixteen he sent a collage of the artist's imagery and received in reply an invitation to visit Dalí's studio. Whitaker began work in London as a photographer in the late 1950s.

=== Australia ===
In 1961, aged 22, Whitaker took advantage of the Australian government's "Ten pound Poms" immigration program, enrolled at the University of Melbourne, then after finding work as a film editor for television, he opened a photographic studio in Melbourne, providing fashion photography for Vogue Australia. According to art historian David Mellor, it was his three years in Australia that transformed Whitaker's work as a photographer.

A major influence was undoubtedly his friendship with two of the leading figures of the Melbourne art world, Georges Mora and Mirka Mora, and through them he came into contact with numerous major figures in Australian art and letters including John Reed, at whose Museum of Modern Art Australia joined an exhibition Photovision 64 in 1964, and Sunday Reed, Ian Sime, Charles and Barbara Blackman, Barrett Reid, Laurence Hope, Arthur Boyd, Sidney Nolan and Joy Hester, as well as his own peer group including Martin Sharp, Richard Neville, Barry Humphries and Germaine Greer. He photographed many of these people including Georges and Mirka Mora and their three sons, Philippe Mora (who became a noted filmmaker), future gallery owner William Mora and actor Tiriel Mora. Others of his subjects during the period were The Seekers and Graham Kennedy.

=== Meeting The Beatles ===
Whitaker was working freelance from a penthouse photo studio in Flinders Street, Melbourne when he met The Beatles' manager Brian Epstein, during the group's 1964 Australian tour, when accompanying a journalist friend for an interview with Epstein for an article for Melbourne's The Jewish News. Whitaker's first published photograph featuring the group depicted Paul McCartney and George Harrison each holding up boomerangs presented to them by Australian fans. As Whitaker recalled in a later interview:

I photographed Epstein, saw he was a bit of a peacock and a cavalier, and put peacock feathers around his head in photographic relief. He was knocked out when he saw the picture.

Epstein also saw Whitaker's collages at the Museum of Modern Art Australia and inviited him to become NEMS' (North End Music Stores) "artistic adviser; in effect an unsalaried 'house photographer' with unprecedented access to the Beatles, creative freedom, and retention of copyright of his work. Initially reluctant, Whitaker accepted the job three months later.

Before leaving for the UK, at the Moras' Aspendale house, Whitaker took pictures (exhibited in Monash Gallery of Art's 2003 survey of his work); in Aspendale Beach, the Mora family are posed, single file, as a procession on the beach with Mirka at the head, and with Martin Sharp and architect Peter Burns; Goodbye Bob, shows the same group holding a sign which reads: "GOD bless thee and keep thee … ASPENDALE 1964".

== England ==
On his arrival in England in August 1964, Whitaker set to work photographing the members of the NEMS stable including Billy J. Kramer & The Dakotas, Gerry & The Pacemakers (including cover shots for the How Do You Like It and Ferry Across The Mersey LPs) and Cilla Black (including cover shots for the Cilla and Cilla Sings A Rainbow LPs). Whitaker photographed at Albert Hall the International Poetry Incarnation festival on 11 June 1965. He also made several photographs of the Australian folk-pop group The Seekers, including the cover shots for Seekers Seen In Green (1967); photos later used for the CDs Live At The Talk Of The Town and The Seekers Complete boxed set. A more recent photo of Judith Durham was used on the cover of her 2001 solo CD Hang On to Your Dream.

It was with The Beatles, and especially John Lennon, with whom he became close friends, that Whitaker created his most enduring work, starting with his early "clean-cut" images of the band and his intimate photos of John Lennon and his first wife, Cynthia, at their home in Weybridge. One of his first assignments was photographing The Beatles during their triumphant second American tour, including the historic Shea Stadium concert in New York. He spent the next two years travelling with the Beatles and shooting them on their tours, at home, in the recording studio, during private moments, and in formal photo sessions. Among the best-known are the album cover photos for their 1966 LP Revolver, and a colour photo of the group inspecting antiques used on the back cover of the compilation album A Collection of Beatles Oldies.

With almost unlimited access to the band, Whitaker quickly became a key figure of the London underground scene. As the group's "court photographer," Whitaker was able to photograph the Fab Four in many moods and situations and accompanied them on their 1966 tour of Japan, where with a Nikon 21mm wide-angle lens he photographed on 2 July the band relaxing in their hotel room at the Tokyo Hilton and collaboratively painting Images of a Woman, their only such artwork.

=== "The Butcher Sleeve" ===
A notable work by Whitaker is the 1966 "Butcher" photograph, which was briefly used for the cover of The Beatles' US album Yesterday and Today. Taken, according to Turner, on 25 March 1966 at Oluf Nissen's studio at 1 The Vale, Chelsea, the image depicted the band in white coats, draped with dismembered doll parts, raw meat, and false teeth.

Whitaker intended the image not as a record cover but for his surrealist triptych A Somnambulant Adventure, a satirical pop-art critique of the band's immense fame and the "golden calf" of Beatlemania. Whitaker reportedly drew inspiration from the surrealist images of puppets by Hans Bellmer and Méret Oppenheim's Object (Le Déjeuner en fourrure). The British Journal of Photography of June/July 1966 in its editorial considered the shift in popular pop-culture photography toward surrealism and fine art, with mention of Whitaker's conceptual pop art approach to media assignments. Interviewed at the time (1966) for British music magazine Disc and Music Echo, Whitaker said that as "a real experiment" he had planned to retouch the photos with haloes and a gold background like a religious icon.

Although popular theories later suggested the cover was a protest against Capitol Records for "butchering" the band's albums for the American market, in a 15 November 1991 interview with Goldmine magazine, Whitaker unequivocally denied any "protest", saying he meant to juxtapose the Beatles' god-like public status with their reality as ordinary people.

Lennon later confirmed that the band also consented to the shoot out of boredom with conventional publicity sessions, while McCartney reportedly defended the image as a commentary on the Vietnam War. The image first appeared in British advertisements without incident, but its release in the United States by Capitol Records sparked significant controversy. Despite Epstein's resistance, the band—reportedly led by McCartney—insisted on using the image. Following a negative reaction from retailers, Capitol Records swiftly withdrew the album and pasted Whitaker's more conventional photograph of the band around a steamer trunk over the original covers. The original "Butcher" covers remain highly sought-after collectors' items.

For many years, Whitaker asserted his copyright as creator of the "Butcher Sleeve" photograph with Apple Corps, who strictly limited its reproduction. Conversely, Apple Corps' long-serving press manager, Derek Taylor, suggested that Apple held the legal copyright since Whitaker was employed by Brian Epstein and NEMS at the time. Taylor acknowledged the photograph's historical significance, despite personal distaste and George Harrison's reported dislike of the image.

Whitaker also criticised the replacement "trunk" cover, which he shot in Epstein's office, as an unworthy concept. In the mid-1990s, Apple's Managing Director Neil Aspinall attempted to negotiate the use of 300 of Whitaker's images for The Beatles Anthology'. However, the agreement fell through when Aspinall subsequently requested the images for free, leading Whitaker to reject the bid entirely.

=== Disraeli Gears ===
By 1967 The Beatles had withdrawn from touring and were working on their landmark album Sgt. Pepper’s Lonely Hearts Club Band, and Whitaker's association with The Beatles and NEMS came to an end. By this time he was living and working in a residential studio space which he called Joubert Studios, located in The Pheasantry in King's Rd, Chelsea, home to his Australian friends Martin Sharp and Philippe Mora and Germaine Greer.

Whitaker's next major project was with Sharp to create the classic psychedelic album cover for the landmark 1967 LP Disraeli Gears by British supergroup Cream for whom Whitaker had made publicity shots from which:

I made a whole series of colour prints and Martin just started cutting them up - much to my annoyance, because they weren't cheap to do. He then laid them out on a 12-inch square as a piece of finished artwork and then painted all over it.

Friendship with Sharp and Greer also led to Whitaker's contributions over 1967-68 to early editions of the underground Oz magazine, notably his collaboration with Sharp on the Plant a Flower Child pin-up for its July 1967 edition.

== Later career ==
Over the next few years Whitaker retreated from the pop scene to concentrate on the art world where he had begun his photographic career. One subject was a longtime hero, the doyen of surrealism, Salvador Dalí, whom he photographed several times between 1967 and 1972. He first met Dalí at his Spanish mansion and told him that he wanted to use his camera "to get inside his head,"...saying "I'll photograph inside every hole I can find"..."I started by photographing his ears, then inside his mouth and up his nose." Three extreme close-ups of Dalí, plus one of Whitaker's wife Susie basking topless under the Spanish sun alongside the artist, were his first efforts in adapting the photographic technique known as a Joiner (used by Jan Dibbets in the 1970s, and from the 1980s by David Hockney) which he dubbed the "Whitograph"; extreme close-ups using all 36 exposures of a roll of film to create a single portrait, that he more fully explored in the 1990s. One of these images, Dali with his mouth wide open, featured on the cover of the Sunday Observer, 6 March 1994.

In 1969 Whitaker photographed Mick Jagger (who nicknamed him "Super Click") during the production of the Nicholas Roeg film Performance, and he accompanied Jagger to Australia to photograph him on location during the filming of Ned Kelly. These were published in book form in 1970 under the title Mick Jagger Is Ned Kelly.

Whitaker also worked as a Fleet Street photojournalist, covering major world events for Time and Life magazines, including the 1966 Florence floods, the Grosvenor Square Anti-Vietnam demonstrations in 1968, the war in Cambodia and Vietnam, during which he was wounded by a grenade, and the bloody war of independence in Bangladesh from which his photograph Bangladesh taken in June 1971, depicts two dead soldiers near the Indian border, lying in golden sunlight, as if asleep, for which he was arrested in Bengal, and charged under the Indian Official Secrets Act.

In the early Seventies, Whitaker effectively retired from photography and for almost twenty years he farmed his property in Sussex. In 1991 he gathered some of his previously unpublished photographs of The Beatles for his successful book The Unseen Beatles. A touring exhibition of his photographs from the 1960s, Underground London, included photographs of the individual Beatles and previously unseen shots from the "Butcher Sleeve" session. The exhibition at Brighton Museum and Art Gallery toured to The National Gallery of Victoria in 1998, then America for a two-year circulation. In September 1995, during the exhibition of his photographs at the National Portrait Gallery London, The Guardian featured Whitaker's brief commentary on a JMW Turner painting in its A brush with genius series:

His conception of thought transferred on to "canvas" is much the lot of the photographer, communication. Photography has many of the same principles involved.

In the early 2000s Robert Whitaker worked on compiling a digital archive of his work, and his photographs of The Seekers were chosen for a special commemorative Australia Post stamp issue to celebrate the group’s 40th anniversary.

== Reception ==
Four of Whitaker's Beatles photographs fetched £4,000, despite the 1992 recession, at a Sotheby's auction of Beatles memorabilia.

Rachel Barnes reviewing his 1995 National Portrait Gallery exhibition for The Guardian, acknowledges his iconic representation of the sixties through "trippy perspectives", but remarks that "not all of Whitaker's photographs are great or unusual shots. But the best are striking and evocative images, redolent of a time which has not yet faded and continues to be recycled."

David Mellor, in an essay for the 2004 Tate exhibiton Art & the 60s: this was tomorrow observes that:

Perhaps the twilight of The Beatles, in the medium of a photography designed to promote them, is first figured in the elegiac portraits of the group made by Robert Whitaker, during the filming of their video promotion for the single, Paperback Writer, in Chiswick Park, in May 1966. Within this series George Harrison appears as a Brandtian figure...oneiric, weird, possessed, as Gothic as Don McCullin's Headhunter of Highgate.

Jon Stapley, in 2015, considering photographer/music artist collaborations cites Whitaker's "groundbreaking" photographs of the Beatles which he asserts "influenced their look and style. He changed their image, which in turn influenced their music."

== Death ==
Whitaker died on 20 September 2011 following a long illness with cancer, aged 71. He left behind wife Susie, a daughter and two sons.

== Exhibitions ==
=== Solo ===
- 1994, October–13 November: Robert Whitaker. Brighton Museum and Art Gallery
- 1995, to 24 September: Sixties London: The Photographs of Robert Whitaker 1965 – 1970. National Portrait Gallery, London
- 1996: Underground London: The Photographs of Robert Whitaker 1965 – 1970. Brighton Museum and Art Gallery
- 1996/97, 11 December– 27 January: Underground London: The Photographs of Robert Whitaker 1965 – 1970. National Gallery of Victoria
- 1997: World-premiere exhibition of Whitaker's photographs of Mick Jagger as Ned Kelly. Gallery 101, Collins Street, Melbourne
- 2002/03, 30 November–26 January:Yesterday & and Today: The Photography of Robert Whitaker 1962-2002 40th anniversary retrospective. Monash Gallery of Art, Melbourne

=== Group ===
- 1964: Photovision 64, with John Bolton, Albert Brown, Nigel Buesst, John Crook, Max Dupain, Edson, Maggie Fraser, Tim Hancock, Jeff Harris, Jan Keune, Tony Knox, Brian McArdle, Roy McDonald, Grier McVea, Ole Olsen, Plateauvians, Cliff Restarick, Veronica Roberts, John Scott, Eric Smith, Wolfgang Sievers, Mark Strizic, Bob Whitaker, Don Whyte, Sue Winslow, Richard Woldendorp, Harry Youlden. Touring Museum of Modern Art and Design of Australia, Melbourne; John Mack, Bowman Arcade, Adelaide; Queen Victoria Art Gallery, Launceston
- 2002, February–March: photographic tribute to George Harrison. Govinda Galleries in Washington
- 2006, 5 July–22 October: Beatles on the Balcony. National Portrait Gallery, London
- 2009/10, 15 October–24 January: Beatles to Bowie: the 60s exposed. National Portrait Gallery, London

== Publications ==
- Whitaker, Bob; Bleiweiss, Herb (1966). Beatles (U.S.A.) Ltd (souvenir program ed.). New York, N.Y.: Raydell. OCLC 25016133.
- Whitaker, Robert (1970). Mick Jagger is Ned Kelly. London: Corgi. ISBN 9780552984904.
- Whitaker, Bob; Mellor, David Alan (1994). Underground London : the photographs of Robert Whitaker, 1965-1970 : an exhibition (Exhibition catalogue ed.). Brighton, England: Brighton Museum & Art Gallery.
- Whitaker, Bob (15 September 1998). The Unseen Beatles. Bounty Books. ISBN 978-0-7537-0056-3. OCLC 156794823.
- Legate, Trevor; Whitaker, Bob (2006). In the company of Dali: the photographs of Robert Whitaker. Sutton Valence: Touchstone books. ISBN 978-0-9551020-4-2.
- Whitaker, Bob; Welch, Chris (2006). Cream: the lost Scottish tour. Hamburg: Repertoire Books. ISBN 978-3-00-018022-4.
- Whitaker, Bob; Hearn, Marcus (2008). Eight Days a Week: inside the Beatles' final world tour (1st ed.). New York: Metro Books. ISBN 9781435109506.
- Whitaker, Robert (2012). With the Beatles: Inside Beatlemania, by Their Official Photographer Robert Whitaker. New York, Godalming: Time Home Entertainment. ISBN 978-1-60320-231-2.

== Collections ==
- National Portrait Gallery, London
- National Portrait Gallery, Canberra
