= Introducing the Seekers =

Studio album by The Seekers
- Released: June 1963
- Genres: Pop, folk, world
- Label: W&G
- Producers: Keith Grant, The Seekers

The Seekers chronology
Introducing the Seekers (1963)	The Seekers (1964)

Introducing the Seekers is the debut studio album by the Australian group the Seekers. It was released in 1963 and was the 10th biggest selling album in Australia in 1968.

== Track listing ==
Side 1

1. "Dese Bones G'wine Rise Again" (traditional; arranged by the Seekers) - 3:30
2. "When the Stars Begin to Fall" - 4:00
3. "Run Come See" - 3:30
4. "This Train" (traditional; arranged by the Seekers) - 3:00
5. "All My Trials" (traditional; arranged by the Seekers) - 3:30
6. "The Light From the Lighthouse" - 2:40

Side 2

1. "Chilly Winds" (John Phillips, John Stewart) - 2:34
2. "Kumbaya" - 3:00
3. "The Hammer Song" (Pete Seeger, Lee Hays) - 2:53
4. "Wild Rover" (traditional; arranged by the Seekers) - 2:20
5. "Katy Cline" - 2:20
6. "Lonesome Traveller" (Lee Hays) - 2:35

In 2018, a digitally remastered version of the album was released with the title The Hammer Song, on which the version of "All My Trials" is 4:00 long.

== Reception ==
When the album was released in the UK in 1965, a columnist for the Bucks Examiner described it as a "HORRIBLE BORE[emphasis in original]", noting that the songs were "performed immaculately", but were "sung exactly in the same tone, [with] no variation at all". The album received a three-star rating.

== Personnel ==
The Seekers

- Athol Guy
- Bruce Woodley
- Judith Durham
- Keith Potger

Technical

- Russ Thompson - engineer
- Barrie Bell - cover

== Charts ==
=== Weekly charts ===
Year	Chart	Position
1963-68	Australian Kent Music Report	5

=== Year-end charts ===
Chart (1968)	Position
Australian Albums Chart	10
