= Farewell (The Seekers album) =

Live album by The Seekers
- Released: 12 April 2019
- Genre: Easy Listening Music
- Label: Decca Records

The Seekers chronology
The Golden Jubilee Album (2012)	Farewell (2019)	The Carnival of Hits Tour 2000 (2019)

Farewell (subtitled The Golden Jubilee Australian Farewell Tour 2013) is a live album by Australian band The Seekers. The album, released on CD and DVD captures the historic concert filmed in The Seekers' hometown of Melbourne in 2013.

== Track listing ==
1. "Come the Day"
2. "I'll Never Find Another You"
3. "A World of Our Own"
4. "Love Is Kind, Love Is Wine"
5. "The Water Is Wide"
6. "When Will the Good Apples Fall"
7. "The Olive Tree"
8. "Silver Threads and Golden Needles"
9. "Morningtown Ride"
10. "Myra"
11. "I Am Australian"
12. "Someday One Day"
13. "When the Stars Begin to Fall"
14. "You're My Spirit"
15. "Walk with Me"
16. "Guardian Angel"
17. "Louisiana Man"
18. "Colours of My Life"
19. "Red Rubber Ball"
20. "Georgy Girl"
21. "Keep a Dream in Your Pocket"
22. "The Carnival Is Over"

== Charts ==
=== Weekly charts ===
Chart (2019)	Peak position
Australian Albums (ARIA)	3

=== Year-end charts ===
Chart (2019)	Position
Australian Albums (ARIA)	52

== Release history ==
Region	Date	Format	Label	Catalogue
Australia	12 April 2019	CD, DVD	Decca	7747211
