= The Big 9 =

Australian quiz show

- Presented by: Athol Guy
- Country of origin: Australia
- Original language: English

Production
- Running time: 30 minutes
- Production company: Screen Gems International

Original release
- Network: TCN 9, GTV-9, CTC-TV
- Release: 17 July 1969 – 1970

The Big 9, also known as Arnott's Big 9, is a 1969 Australian television quiz show broadcast on TCN 9 in Sydney, GTV-9 in Melbourne and CTC-TV in Canberra. Hosted by Athol Guy it featured two contestants trying to reach a score of nine points. On a set with sound proof booths contestants would chose between easier questions worth low points and more difficult questions worth more. All of the questions are true or false format. The format was devised by Dan Enright who created Twenty-One in America.
