= Images of a Woman =

1966 painting by the Beatles

- Artist: The Beatles (John Lennon, Paul McCartney, George Harrison, Ringo Starr)
- Year: 1966
- Medium: Oil and watercolour on paper
- Dimensions: 76 cm × 100 cm (30 in × 40 in)
- Location: New York City, United States

Images of a Woman, also known as The Tokyo Painting, is an abstract painting by the English rock band the Beatles. It is believed to be the only painting they produced collaboratively.

== History ==
Images of a Woman was painted over three nights in July 1966 in a Tokyo Hilton suite where all four of the Beatles (John Lennon, Paul McCartney, George Harrison and Ringo Starr) were staying as part of their tour of the Far East. The group had been placed in lockdown as a precaution by the Japanese authorities after death threats had been received. The Japanese tour promoter, Tats Nagashima, had painting materials brought in for the group to use. The band's tour photographer, Robert Whitaker, was present and was amazed by how tranquil the band members seemed as they painted: "Absolutely the best period I ever witnessed among the Beatles", Whitaker said, adding that he "never saw them calmer, more contented than at this time... They'd stop, go and do a concert, and then it was 'Let's go back to the picture!'"

The resulting painting was given to a charity auction. It was originally bought by the Japanese Beatles fan club president, Tetsusaburo Shimoyama. In the mid-1990s it was sold to an art dealer in Osaka for around $191,000, and re-appeared in 2002 on the website eBay. It was put up for sale by Philip Weiss Auctions in 2012, selling in New York City for $155,250. The painting was auctioned again at Christie's in February 2024, where it sold for £1.4 million.

== Description ==
Each of the Beatles painted one corner of the 30 × 40 inch canvas. Despite the painting's title, it does not feature any figurative depictions of a woman, consisting only of abstract designs painted using oil and watercolour against a brightly coloured background. A lamp left in the middle of the canvas left a blank circle when it was removed; the group used this space for their signatures. Based on photographs taken during the painting's development, the Beatles painted the following sections (when viewing the image with the signatures the correct way up);

Who painted each section
Section	Painter
Top left	John Lennon
Top right	Paul McCartney
Bottom left	Ringo Starr
Bottom right	George Harrison
