= Broadway Folly =

1930 film

- Title card
- Directed by: Walter Lantz
- Produced by: Walter Lantz
- Starring: Bill Nolan
- Music by: David Broekman
- Animation by: Rollin Hamilton; Bill Nolan; Tom Palmer
- Color process: Black and white
- Production company: Walter Lantz Productions
- Distributed by: Universal Pictures
- Release date: March 3, 1930
- Running time: 7:46
- Language: English

Broadway Folly is a 1930 animated cartoon by Walter Lantz which stars Oswald the Lucky Rabbit.

== Plot ==
The full short

Oswald drives his uncovered car, heading towards a night club. After parking his car at a sidewalk by the place, he was immediately flagged down by the bellhop who tells him that parking there is not permitted. As a solution, Oswald compresses his car with his hands until it is hand-sized. The rabbit drops the tiny vehicle in his shorts and gives the bellhop a raspberry before proceeding to the club's entrance.

Coming to the night club also was a large wolf. Holding onto the wolf's garments is his cub who refuses to separate from him. Frustrated by the persistent holding, the wolf puts his offspring inside large pajamas and hangs it on a light post.

The wolf cub was able to come out of the pajamas but was saddened upon losing sight of his father. He came to the night club's entrance and asked "Is my father in there?" A voice from inside tells him not to stay by the doors. The wolf cub would ask the same question to a number of people but would never get the answer he wanted.

Inside the night club, the patrons are dancing as the musicians play the tune Alexander's Ragtime Band. Everyone appears to be having a pleasant time, especially Oswald who stands on a chair, rocking it back and forth. The next event features four dogs in tuxedos who sing part of the song Sweet Adeline on stage, but their performance wasn't well received by the guests.

Still enjoying the atmosphere nonetheless, Oswald dances on his table. Sitting by and sharing his table is the large wolf. As he dances, the rabbit accidentally kicks the wolf in the nose, much to the latter's disturbance. The wolf then grabs Oswald's head and rips it off his body. Miraculously, Oswald survives and is able to put himself back together. As retribution, Oswald throws a jar on the wolf's head.

While the wolf tries to take the jar off his head, a cow laughs at him. As a response, the wolf kicks the cow, who in turn, gets laughed at by a mouse. The cow spits at the mouse who then gets laughed at by an elephant. The mouse pulls the elephant's trunk and lets go, causing that animal to trample on the other guests. As a result, everyone gets into a fist fight. Some patrons were able to flee but the rest remained in the trouble. A police car arrives at the scene and takes the whole night club building away.

Knowing his father is still inside, the wolf cub tries to follow the moving building but cannot keep up. As he stops, he comes across an opaque telephone booth at a park. The wolf cub asks his question but only receives silence. Desperate, the little wolf rips open the booth to find a Tibetan man making a phone call inside.

== "Is my father in there?" ==
The wolf cub's quote "Is my father in there?" would be reused in two later cartoons produced by Lantz. It was a parody of pro-temperance works published several years earlier (Father, Dear Father being the most common example) which used similar words.

== See also ==
- Oswald the Lucky Rabbit filmography
