= Future Road =

Album by Judith Durham

Studio album by Judith Durham and The Seekers
- Released: 20 October 1997
- Genre: Easy listening, folk, world, country
- Label: EMI Music Australia
- Producer: Charles Fisher

Judith Durham albums chronology
Mona Lisas/ Always There (1996)	Future Road (1997)	1968 BBC Farewell Spectacular (1999)

The Seekers albums chronology
Treasure Chest (1997)	Future Road (1997)	The Very Best of The Seekers (1998)

Alternate cover
- 2013 re-release

Future Road is a studio album credited to Australian recording artist Judith Durham and The Seekers. It is Durham's eighth studio album and The Seekers' eleventh. The album was released in Australia in October 1997 and peaked at number 4 on the ARIA Charts and by Christmas was certified platinum.

The album was re-released on 25 October 2013, with a bonus "Making of Future Road" DVD and video clips.

== Track listing ==
1. "Calling Me Home" (Judith Durham, Jeff Vincent) - 3:40
2. "Speak to the Sky" (Rick Springfield) - 3:36
3. "The Bush Girl" (Henry Lawson, Bruce Woodley) - 4:58
4. "It Doesn't Matter Anymore" (Paul Anka) - 3:01
5. "Future Road" (Keith Potger, Trevor Spencer, Boyd Wilson) - 3:54
6. "The Shores of Avalon" (Judith Durham, Athol Guy, John Kovac, Keith Potger, Bruce Woodley) - 4:00
7. "Guardian Angel/Guiding Light" (Keith Potger) - 2:32
8. "Amazing" (Bruce Woodley/Michael Cristiano) - 3:17
9. "Gotta Love Someone" (Bruce Woodley/Michael Cristiano) - 3:20
10. "Forever Isn't Long Enough (For Me)" (Keith Potger, Byron Hill) - 3:05
11. "The Circle of Love" (Rick Beresford / Keith Potger) - 3:06
12. "It's Hard to Leave" (Judith Durham) - 4:01

== Charts ==
=== Weekly charts ===
Chart (1997/98)	Peak position
Australian Albums (ARIA)	4
New Zealand Albums (RMNZ)	13

=== Year-end charts ===
Chart (1997)	Position
Australian Artist Albums (ARIA)	51

== Certifications ==
Region	Certification	Certified units/sales
Australia (ARIA)	Platinum	70,000^{^}
^{^} Shipments figures based on certification alone.
