= 1967 Academy Awards =

1967 Academy Awards may refer to:

- 39th Academy Awards, the Academy Awards ceremony that took place in 1967
- 40th Academy Awards, the 1968 ceremony honoring the best in film for 1967
