= Live at the Talk of the Town (The Seekers album) =

Live album by The Seekers
- Released: September 1968
- Recorded: The Talk of the Town, London, July 1968
- Genre: Pop, Folk, World
- Label: EMI Columbia
- Producer: Mickie Most

The Seekers chronology
Seekers Seen in Green (1967)	Live at the Talk of the Town (1968)	The Seekers' Greatest Hits (1968)

Live at the Talk of the Town is the first live album by the Australian group The Seekers. The album was recorded as the group's four-week season at the prestigious London nightspot, which had begun on June 10, 1968, came to an end. It was released on September 6, 1968.

== Reception ==
Bruce Eder from AllMusic wrote, "Live at the Talk of the Town is an extraordinary album, as well as the group's final effort together as a continuing organisation, recorded during an engagement at the renowned London restaurant/theater just a week before the quartet was dissolved. It features the group in uncommonly loose-limbed form, having lots of fun with the audience, quite obviously enjoying the performance they're giving, and throwing themselves into it head first; after four years of whirlwind international success, perhaps they knew it would be their last hurrah and their only live recording .... and [it] is still extremely rewarding almost 40 years later".

== Track listing ==
Side 1

1. "Music of the World a Turnin'" (Estelle Levitt, Don Thomas)
2. "I'll Never Find Another You" (Tom Springfield)
3. "With My Swag All On My Shoulder" (The Seekers)
4. "Hello Mary Lou" (Gene Pitney)
5. "I Wish You Could Be Here" (Bruce Woodley, Paul Simon)
6. "We Shall Not Be Moved" (traditional)
7. "Morningtown Ride" (Reynolds)
8. "A World of Our Own" (Springfield)

Side 2

1. "Rattler" (Woodley)
2. "The Olive Tree" (Tom Springfield, Diane Lampert)
3. "Colours of My Life" (Reilly, Durham)
4. "Ragtime Mix" "Sweet Adeline" / "Maple Leaf Rag" (Henry W. Armstrong, Richard Gerard, Scott Joplin, Russell, Styne)
5. "Angeline is Always Friday" (Woodley, Paxton)
6. "Love Is Kind, Love Is Wine" (Woodley)
7. "Happy Birthday to You" / "The Carnival is Over" (Patty Hill, Mildred J. Hill, Springfield)
8. "Georgy Girl" (Springfield, Dale)

== Charts ==
Chart (1968)	Peak position
UK Albums (OCC)	2

== See also ==
- 1968 BBC Farewell Spectacular (1999)
