= Sweet Adeline (song) =

1903 ballad

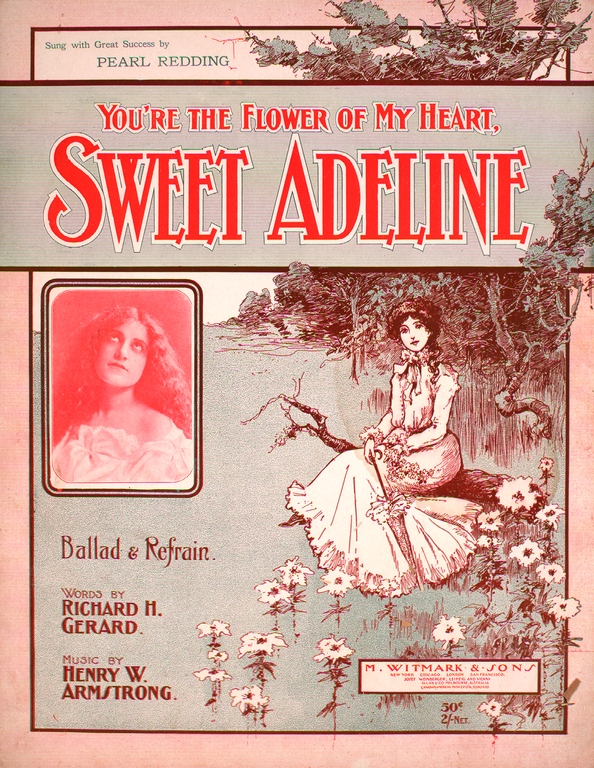
Cover of 1903 sheet music, with inset photo of singer Pearl Redding

"(You're the Flower of My Heart,) Sweet Adeline" is a ballad best known as a barbershop standard. It was first published in 1903, with lyrics by Richard Husch Gerard to music by Harry Armstrong, from a tune he had written in 1896 at the age of 18. According to a 1928 newspaper story, the lyrics were inspired "by a girl who worked at the music counter of a New York department store." After failing to find a publisher with the initial title, "You're the Flower of My Heart, Sweet Rosalie", according to a story the two decided a new title was in order and were inspired by a poster advertising the farewell tour of opera singer Adelina Patti. It did not become a hit until it was performed in 1904 by the group The Haydn Quartet. The Haydn Quartet's version was #1 for 10 weeks in 1904, and the Peerless Quartet also hit #1 with their version in 1904, for three weeks, according to Joel Whitburn's Pop Memories.

John F. Fitzgerald, who served as mayor of Boston, represented Massachusetts in Congress and was the maternal grandfather of President John F. Kennedy, made "Sweet Adeline" his theme song in 1909. Over the next four decades, he personally sang it at countless political and social events and on the radio.

== In popular culture ==
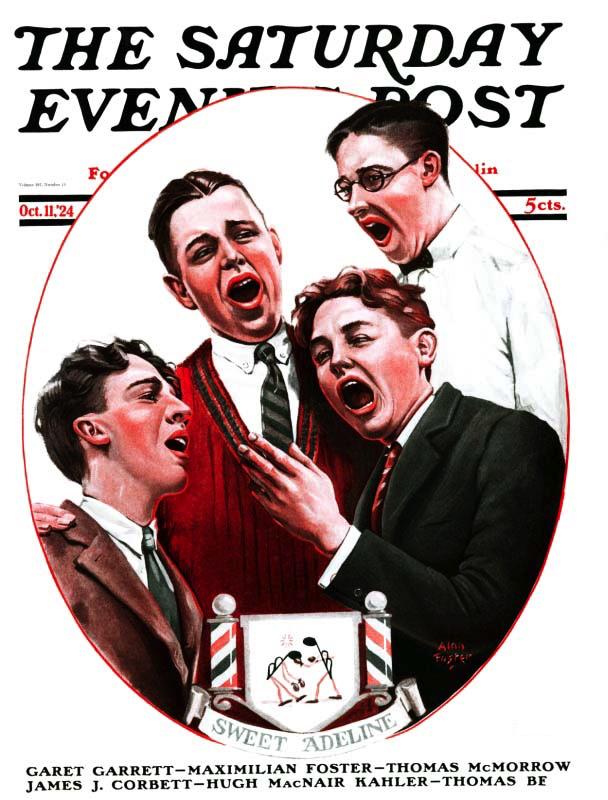
Barbershop quartet depicted singing Sweet Adeline, The Saturday Evening Post (11 Oct 1924)

- In Charlie Chaplin's 1922 silent short film, Pay Day, four men sing "Sweet Adeline" outside of a bar, according to an intertitle.
- the 1924 Disney short, Alice's Wild West Show, features a quartet singing the song, followed by the crowd throwing rotten vegetables and vases at them.
- In June 1926, Max Fleischer and Red Seal Pictures released an animated version of "Sweet Adeline", made in the sound-on-film Phonofilm process, as part of his series Song Car-Tunes, featuring "follow the bouncing ball".
- In the 1929 western Hell's Heroes, one of the main characters establishes the time period of the film by telling his harmonica-playing friend, "Play one of the new songs! Play 'Sweet Adeline'!"
- Mickey Mouse serenades Minnie Mouse with "Sweet Adeline" in the 1929 short The Karnival Kid.
- A piece of "Sweet Adeline" was featured in Broadway Folly (1930), an Oswald the Lucky Rabbit cartoon.
- It was briefly performed by Bosko and three pigs in the 1930 Looney Tunes short The Booze Hangs High.
- It was performed by a quartet of sea turtles in the 1930 Van Beuren Studios animated short The Haunted Ship.
- The song was performed by the Marx Brothers in their 1931 film Monkey Business.
- The song was performed by Edgar Kennedy, Robert Armstrong, William Cagney and Bud Jamison in the 1934 film Flirting with Danger.
- In the 1935 Looney Tunes short, Gold Diggers of '49, a barbershop quartet sings it.
- Sung by Tony Pastor with Artie Shaw July 22, 1937 on Brunswick 7936
- The song was performed in a key scene in the Howard Hawks comedy film Ball of Fire (1941).
- It featured in the 1942 Preston Sturges comedy The Palm Beach Story.
- The song was featured in a 1952 episode of the TV show I Love Lucy entitled "Lucy's Show Biz Swan Song", in which Ricky Ricardo (Desi Arnaz) performs the song in a barbershop quartet at the Tropicana Night Club as part of a Gay Nineties revue. The clip was also part of a flashback in the I Love Lucy Christmas Special.
- The song was featured in the Disneyland attraction America Sings, performed by a goose named Blossom-Nosed Murphy.
- Bing Crosby included the song in a medley on his album 101 Gang Songs (1961)
- The Seekers used the song as a regular part of their live act in the 1960s; lead vocalist Judith Durham would sit out the song while Athol Guy, Keith Potger, and Bruce Woodley would perform the song as an a cappella trio. The song was included on their 1968 album, Live at the Talk of the Town.
- Country music pioneer Jimmie Rodgers references "Sweet Adeline" in his song "My Old Pal".
- The song was briefly sung by drunkards in the film Victor/Victoria.
- The song was part of a medley of barbershop songs sung by the Beagle Boys in an episode of DuckTales.
- In season 5 episode 15 of The Andy Griffith Show, there is a snippet of a drunken Barney and Otis singing the song.
- "Sweet Adeline" is referenced in the barbershop songs "Down Our Way" and I Love That Barbershop Style" as well as many other popular barbershop songs.
- "Sweet Adeline" is referenced in "The Other End of the Telescope" on Elvis Costello and the Attractions' 1996 album All This Useless Beauty.
- Elliott Smith's song of the same name is the first track on the 1998 album XO.
- In the Oh Yeah! Cartoons short "Too Many Timmys", a pilot episode of The Fairly OddParents, a group of Timmy Turner clones sings the song to irritate Vicky.
- The Simpsons episode "Homer's Barbershop Quartet" features The Be Sharps singing the song when Barney Gumble becomes a new member of the group.
- A fast version of the song was sung by a barbershop quartet of pigs in the Elmo's World episode "Singing". A running gag during the episode was the pigs coming in to continue singing the song only to be pulled away by a vaudeville cane.
- In 2017, Avriel Kaplan referenced "Sweet Adeline" in the track "Sweet Adeline", written for the Avriel and the Sequoias debut album, Sage and Stone.
- In 2017, Alt-J wrote and referenced "Sweet Adeline" in a different fashion with their track "Adeline" on the album, Relaxer. The band described the song as a love ballad from a shark's point of view, singing about its fascination, Adeline, a human girl.
- The song was performed by the characters Ed, Ted, Ned and Fred in an episode of the animated web series CartoonMania.
- The song was covered by jam band Phish in several live performances.
- The Alcoholics Anonymous conference-approved book, Living Sober, references "Sweet Adeline" in the section, 'Letting go of old ideas'.
