= A World of Our Own (album) =

Studio album by The Seekers
- Released: 1965
- Studios: Abbey Road Studios, London
- Genres: Pop, Folk, World
- Labels: Columbia, EMI Music
- Producer: Tom Springfield

The Seekers chronology
Hide & Seekers (1964)	A World of Our Own (1965)	The Seekers Sing Their Big Hits (1965)

Alternative cover
- North American album cover

Professional ratings
Review scores
Source	Rating
Uncut	2/5 stars

A World of Our Own is the fourth studio album by the Australian group The Seekers. The album was released in 1965. In some countries, the album was titled The Seekers. The album peaked at number 123 in the Billboard 200 and number 5 in the United Kingdom.

== Reception ==
Richie Unterberber from AllMusic said; "The title track is an acceptable pop-folk song in the "I'll Never Find Another You" fashion. But the rest is rather ho-hum fare in the style of Peter, Paul & Mary with a slightly more prominent beat. Bruce Woodley sneaks in with a couple of compositions, but most of this is traditional folk with far less pop flair than Tom Springfield's songs, such as "This Land Is Your Land", "Allentown Jail", "Just a Closer Walk With Thee" and "You Can Tell the World." A couple [of] early Bob Dylan covers and a version of Ian Tyson's "Four Strong Winds" reinforce the sense of a group whose sound was still more suited for 1963 than 1965, on album at least."

== Track listing ==
Side 1

1. "A World of Our Own" (Tom Springfield) — 2:38
2. "Don't Think Twice, It's All Right" (Bob Dylan) — 3:02
3. "The Leaving of Liverpool" (The Clancy Brothers and Tommy Makem) — 2:57
4. "This Land Is Your Land" (Woody Guthrie) — 2:33
5. "Two Summers" (Bruce Woodley) — 2:45
6. "The Times They are a Changin'" (Dylan) — 2:32

Side 2

1. "Just a Closer Walk with Thee" (Traditional; arranged by The Seekers) — 3:19
2. "Don't Tell Me My Mind" (Woodley) — 2:14
3. "Allentown Jail" (Irving Gordon) — 2:35
4. "Four Strong Winds" (Ian Tyson) — 3:22
5. "You Can Tell the World" (Bob Gibson, Hamilton Camp) — 2:13

== Personnel ==
The Seekers

- Athol Guy - bass
- Bruce Woodley - guitar, banjo
- Keith Potger - guitar, 12-string guitar, mandolin
- Judith Durham - vocals, upright piano, tambourine
