= The Seekers (1964 album) =

Studio album by The Seekers
- Released: 1964
- Genre: Pop, Folk, World
- Label: W&G
- Producer: Keith Grant, The Seekers

The Seekers chronology
Introducing the Seekers (1964)	The Seekers (1964)	Hide & Seekers (1964)

The Seekers is the second studio album by the Australian group The Seekers. The album was released in 1964. In some countries, the album was titled Roving with the Seekers.

"Waltzing Matilda" was released in November 1963 and peaked at number 74 on the Australian music report.

== Track listing ==
Side 1

1. "The Wreck of the Old '97" (G. B. Grayson, Henry Whitter; arranged by The Seekers) – 3:08
2. "Danny Boy" (Frederic Weatherly) – 3:03
3. "Waltzing Matilda" (Banjo Paterson, Marie Cowan) – 2:54
4. "Cotton Fields" (Huddie Ledbetter; arranged by The Seekers) – 2:52
5. "Lemon Tree" (Will Holt) – 3:27
6. "Gotta Travel On" (Billy Grammer) – 2:32

Side 2

1. "With My Swag All on My Shoulder" (Athol Guy, Bruce Woodley, Judith Durham, Keith Potger) – 1:53
2. "Plaisir d'amour" (Jean-Paul-Égide Martini, Jean-Pierre Claris de Florian) – 2:46
3. "Isa Lei" (A.W. Caten) – 3:39
4. "Whisky in the Jar" (Traditional; arranged by The Seekers) – 3:11
5. "Five Hundred Miles" (Hedy West) – 1:46
6. "Gypsy Rover (The Whistling Gypsy)" (Leo Maguire; arranged by The Seekers) – 2:42
7. "South Australia" (Traditional; arranged by The Seekers) – 2:01

== Personnel ==
The Seekers

- Athol Guy
- Bruce Woodley
- Judith Durham
- Keith Potger
