= South Australia (song) =

Sea shanty

"South Australia" (Roud 325) is a sea shanty and folk song, also known under such titles as "Rolling King" and "Bound for South Australia". As an original worksong it was sung in a variety of trades, including being used by the wool and later the wheat traders who worked the clipper ships between Australian ports and London. In adapted form, it is now a very popular song among folk music performers that is recorded by many artists and is present in many of today's song books.

== History as a shanty ==
Information on the age, spread, and practical use of the shanty is relatively sparse. However, the evidence at hand does not suggest there is anything particularly or locally "Australian" about the song, contrary to how it has become popularly envisioned since the late 20th century.

It was first noted by sea music author L.A. Smith, who collected it "from a coloured seaman at the [Sailors'] 'Home'" in London and published it in her 1888 collection, The Music of the Waters.

The shanty is not mentioned again until the 1900s (decade). Patterson (1900) mentions a heaving chanty titled "Bound to Western Australia," and the veteran African-American sailor James H. Williams mentioned the song in a 1909 article.

In the 1930s or 1940s, at Sailors' Snug Harbor, New York, shanty collector William Main Doerflinger recorded veteran sailor William Laurie of Greenock, Scotland, who began a career in sailing ships in the late 1870s. The one verse sung by Laurie was published, with tune, in Doerflinger's 1951 book.

This shanty is not attested in writing again until Lydia Parrish's study of the music tradition of Georgia Sea Islanders, published in 1942.

In 1946, J.T. Hatfield shared his recollections of a much earlier, 1886 voyage as a passenger traveling from Pensacola to Nice. During this voyage, Hatfield had noted the shanties sung by the crew, who were all black men from Jamaica. This version, which includes both tune and text, includes the unusual phrase, "Hooray! You're a lanky!", which may have been a mishearing by Hatfield.

Another remembered version comes in F.P. Harlow's Chanteying Aboard American Ships (1962), in which the author recalls shanties sung aboard the ship Akbar on a trip from Massachusetts to Melbourne, Australia in 1876. A crew mate "Dave" is said to have taught this to the crew while pumping at the windlass. As no references to the song put it any earlier than the mid-1870s, it may well be that the song was new at the time.

== Work function and lyrical variations ==
Smith said it was a capstan chanty, as evidenced by the refrain which indicates, "Heave away! Heave away!" Parrish found that stevedores hauling heavy timber used the song with the chorus, "Haul away, I’m a rollin' king."

=== Lyrics ===
Like most shanties of this type, "South Australia" was sung to a flexible combination of customary verses, floating verses from within the general chanty repertoire, and verses improvised in the moment or particular to individual singers. The song was of indefinite length, and created by supplying solo verses to a two-part refrain followed by a grand chorus. The following is a sample after Stan Hugill:

(solo) Oh South Australia is me home
(chorus) Heave away! Heave away!
(solo) South Australia is me home
(chorus) An' we're bound for South Australia.

Heave away, heave away
Oh heave away, you rolling king,
We're bound for South Australia

Solo verse couplets documented to have been sung to "South Australia" include the following from sailors of the 19th century.

I see my wife standing on the quay
The tears do start as she waves to me.

I'll tell you the truth and I'll tell you no lie;
If I don't love that girl I hope I may die.

And now I'm bound for a foreign strand,
With a bottle of whisky in my hand.

I'll drink a glass to the foreign shore
And one to the girl that I adore.

== As a popular song ==
In the 1940s, "South Australia" became popular as a camp song. And by the second decade of the 20th century, it had been adopted by several college glee clubs.

A slightly different version of the song was published by Doerflinger in 1951. English folk revival singer A.L. Lloyd recorded the song, without citing a source, on the 1957 album Blow Boys Blow. He used Doerflinger's melody and the phrase "hear me sing," which are unique to that collection, which Lloyd used for other shanties he performed.

The Clancy Brothers recorded the song in 1962, in a version similar to A.L. Lloyd's. Patrick Clancy, one of the Clancy Brothers, had edited Lloyd's Blow Boys Blow album, which was released by Tradition Records, a label that Clancy managed. The Clancy Brothers rendered Lloyd's phrase "lollop around Cape Horn" as the unintelligible "wallop around Cape Horn." The Clancy Brothers' version is the most common one sung by folk music and shanty performers. The song has been recorded many times in both traditional and modern arrangements.

A traditional Morris dance of the same name is performed to the tune, from the style of Adderbury.

=== Traditional recordings ===
- A.L. Lloyd and Ewan MacColl on their 1957 album Blow Boys Blow
- A.L. Lloyd on his 1958 Australian album Across the Western Plains and on his 1960 UK album Outback Ballads
- The Clancy Brothers & Tommy Makem on their 1962 album The Boys Won't Leave The Girls Alone.
- The Seekers on their 1964 UK album, The Seekers (also known as Roving with the Seekers)
- Trevor Lucas on his 1966 Australian album Overlander
- The Bushwhackers and Bullockies Bush Band on their 1974 album The Shearer's Dream, Picture Records
- The Corries on their 1977 album Live from Scotland Volume 4
- Liam Clancy, Robbie O'Connell, and Donal Clancy on the 1998 collection of shanties and sea songs, Wild and Wasteful Ocean
- The Poxy Boggards on their 2004 album Liver Let Die
- Nathan Carter on his 2013 Irish album Where I Wanna Be
- The Dubliners recorded the song on several live albums

=== Modern versions ===
- The Clumsy Lovers on their album Live! perform a rock version of the song as the first part of a medley with "Let the Sunshine In".
- The Pogues on their 1988 album If I Should Fall from Grace with God
- Greenhorns as "Směr Jižní Austrálie" on their 1982 album Oheň Z Dříví Eukalyptu
- The Wiggles as "Bound for South Australia" on their 1992 album Here Comes A Song
- Churchfitters on their album New Tales for Old
- Chanticleer on their album Wondrous Love - A Folk Song Collection
- Gaelic Storm on their 1999 album Herding Cats
- Seamus Kennedy on his 2008 album Sailing Ships and Sailing Men
- Fisherman's Friends in their 2010 album Port Isaac's Fisherman's Friends
- Stan Hugill on the compilation album Classic Maritime Music from Smithsonian Folkways
- Johnny Collins on his Shanties & Songs of the Sea
- Julian Ferraretto on his 2010 album Near
- Dust Rhinos as a medley with "Drunken Sailor" on their 2000 album Got Guinness.
- "South Australia" was recorded by the American quintet Bounding Main and released on their 2008 album Going Overboard.
- The Storm Weather Shanty Choir released a version of the song on the 2005 album Off To Sea Once More.
- The Whistlin’ Donkeys released a version of the song in their 2018 live album.
- The Longest Johns released a version of this song on their 2025 album Pieces of Eight.
