= Lonesome Traveller =

1950 song written by Lee Hays

Lonesome Traveler is a song written by Lee Hays who first recorded it in 1950 with The Weavers featuring his vocals and the banjo, guitar and vocal harmonies of fellow Weavers, Pete Seeger, Fred Hellerman and Ronnie Gilbert. The Weavers themselves described the song as, “A modern spiritual, with driving rhythm and subtle off-beats.” It was backed with the Woody Guthrie song So Long, It's Been Good to Know You. The lyrics begin, "I'm just a lonely and a lonesome traveler ...."

== Selected Versions ==
- Lee Hays and The Weavers with Gordon Jenkins, His Orchestra and Chorus. Decca 45 rpm record 9-27376 or 10" 78 27376. (October 24, 1950).
- Lee Hays, Pete Seeger, Dock Reese, Hally Wood, Bess Lomax Hawes, Butch Hawes. Lonesome Valley, various artists - Folkways 10" lp, FA 2010, (1951).
- The Tarriers - Glory lp 1200, (1956) and Lonesome Traveler/ East Virginia, Glory 7" 45 rpm single, 45-271 and London 45 rpm single, HLU - 4600 ( both 1958).
- Lonnie Donegan - Lonesome Traveler / Times Are Getting Hard Boys. 10" 78 rpm record, Pye Nixa 15158, (1958) and self titled Dot lp 3159 or lp 3394, ( both 1959).
- Kingston Trio - Lonesome Traveler, From the hungry i, Capitol Records 1157, (1959) and Shady Grove/Lonesome Traveler. (1959) Live. Essential Kingston Trio, Shout Factory CD 826663-10183
- Charles Blackwell - A Lover And His Lass / Lonesome Traveler - Triumph and Those Plucking Strings RPM 310, ( both 1960).
- The Limeliters 1960 debut album, The Limeliters, Elektra Records, EKL - 7180. They also did live versions on their albums The London Concert (1963), Reunion (1973), The Chicago Tapes (1976, released in 2001), Alive! In Concert (1985), Harmony (1987) and The Limeliters (Live) - An Evening With The Chad Mitchell Trio: Live At The Birchmere (1995).
- Karl Denver Decca 7" ep, DFE 8501 (1962) and Wimoweh, Great Voices of the Century CD GVC1013, (2014).
- Joe & Eddie There's a Meetin' Here Tonight, GNP Crescendo 86 (1963) and Best of Joe and Eddie GNP Crescendo 2032, (1966).
- The Seekers Introducing The Seekers, Marvel MLPS - 2060, (1963).
- Trini Lopez - Kansas City / Lonesome Traveler. 7" 45 rpm single, Reprise Records R-20 236 and By Popular Demand, More Trini Lopez At P.J.'s, Reprise Records lp RS-6103 (both 1963).
- Guy Carawan Songs of the Freedom Riders and Sit Ins, Folkways FH 5591 (1964).
- The Au Go Go Singers They Call Us Au Go Go Singers, Roulette lp 25280 or Columbia 33SX-1696, (both 1964).
- Marianne Faithfull Come My Way, Lillith LR-354 or Decca 4688 (both 1965).
- Esther & Abi Ofarim Das Neue Esther & Abi Ofarim Album Stern Musik lp 843 920 or Philips lp 843 920 ( both 1966)
- Roger Whittaker Travelling with Roger Whitaker, RCA Victor KPL1-0078, (1974).

For a more in depth discography, see also https://secondhandsongs.com/work/136488/all
