= Emerald City (song) =

Single by The Seekers

from the album The Best of The Seekers
- A-side: "Emerald City"
- B-side: "Music Of The World A Turnin'"
- Released: 1967
- Recorded: 1967
- Genre: Pop
- Label: EMI Columbia
- Songwriter(s): Keith Potger, as "John Martin"; Kim Fowley

The Seekers singles chronology
"Georgy Girl" (1966)	"Emerald City" (1967)	"When Will The Good Apples Fall" (1967)

"Emerald City" is a 1967 song by The Seekers about a visit to the fictional Emerald City from L. Frank Baum's Oz books. Set to the tune of "Ode to Joy" from Beethoven's Ninth Symphony, "Emerald City" reached #50 on the UK Charts in 1967.

The song was recorded in 1967 and released as a single around Christmas in 1967. The original writing credit was given to Kim Fowley and John Martin, but during a 1993 reunion tour, The Seekers revealed that "John Martin" was actually the pen name of band member Keith Potger.
