= Dese Bones G'wine Rise Again =

American Negro spiritual

Dese Bones G'wine Rise Again is an American Negro spiritual that tells the story of the expulsion of Adam and Eve from the Garden of Eden.

In this spiritual, a caller tells the story in rhymed couplets; each line of the couplet is followed by the final line of an abbreviated chorus sung in answer by the audience or congregation. Between each couplet, a complete chorus is sung. In the example below, the sung chorus is given in italics; the other words are the caller's lyrics:

De Lawd, He thought He’d make a man

Dese bones gwine rise again
Made ‘im outa mud an’ a han’ful o’ san
Dese bones gwine to rise again

(Chorus)

I knowed it Indeed I knowed it, brother

I knowed it Dese bones gwine to rise again

There are several variants of the lyrics; the dramatic and creative talents of the caller generate considerable variation. The song was covered by the gospel group The Jubalaires, and the Australian folk band The Seekers and many other artists.
