= Hide & Seekers =

Studio album by The Seekers
- Released: 1964
- Genre: Pop, Folk, World
- Label: World Record Club
- Producer: The Seekers

The Seekers chronology
The Seekers (1964)	Hide & Seekers (1964)	A World of Our Own (1965)

Hide & Seekers is the third studio album by Australian group the Seekers. The album was released in 1964. In some countries, the album was titled The Four & Only Seekers, The New Seekers or Morningtown Ride. The album peaked at number 122 in the United States.

== Track listing ==
Side 1

1. "This Little Light of Mine" (Harry Dixon Loes) — 2:15
2. "Morning Town Ride" * (Malvina Reynolds) — 2:35
3. "The Water is Wide" (Traditional) — 3:52
4. "Well, Well, Well" (Rod Argent) — 2:34
5. "Lady Mary" (Traditional) — 3:21
6. "We're Moving On" (Traditional) — 2:02

Side 2

1. "Ox Driving Song" (Traditional) — 1:44
2. "Kumbaya" (Traditional) — 2:25
3. "Blowin' in the Wind" (Bob Dylan) — 2:26
4. "The Eriskay Love Lilt" (Marjory Kennedy-Fraser) — 2:34
5. "Chilly Winds" (Keith Potger) — 2:00
6. "What Have They Done to the Rain" - (Malvina Reynolds) — 2:27
- Note that the incorrect spelling of "Morning Town" as two words is as it appeared on the earlier pressings. In later pressings, and in all future compilations, the spelling was corrected to "Morningtown".

== Personnel ==
- Bobby Richards and His Orchestra - orchestra

Technical

- Cyril Ornadel - executive producer
- Keith Grant - sound supervision
