= Island of Dreams (song) =

Single by The Springfields

from the album The Springfields
- B-side: "The Johnson Boys"
- Released: 1962
- Genre: Contemporary folk
- Length: 2:35
- Label: Philips
- Songwriter: Tom Springfield

"Island of Dreams" is a song, written by Tom Springfield, and released by The Springfields in 1962. The song spent 26 weeks on the UK's Record Retailer chart, peaking at No. 5, while reaching No. 2 in Ireland, No. 2 in Israel, and No. 7 on New Zealand's "Lever Hit Parade". The song was a regional hit in the United States, reaching No. 14 on WLS's "Silver Dollar Survey" in Chicago, but nationally the song only reached No. 129 on Billboard's "Bubbling Under the Hot 100".

"Island of Dreams" has been covered by a number of artists, including Johnny Tillotson, Mary Hopkin & Sundance, and The Seekers.

In 2023, "Island of Dreams" was included on the soundtrack of Wes Anderson's Asteroid City.

== Chart performance ==
Chart (1963)	Peak position
Ireland - The Irish Times	2
Israel - Kol Yisrael	2
UK - Record Retailer	5
UK - Year End Charts	4
New Musical Express	7
Melody Maker	6
New Zealand - "Lever Hit Parade"	7
US - Billboard Bubbling Under the Hot 100	129
