= Seekers Seen in Green =

Studio album by the Seekers
- Released: November 1, 1967
- Recorded: August 1967
- Studio: Olympic Studios, London
- Genre: Pop
- Label: EMI/Columbia
- Producer: Keith Grant, The Seekers

The Seekers chronology
Introducing the Seekers Big Hits (1967)	Seekers Seen in Green (1967)	Live at the Talk of the Town (1968)

Alternative cover
- Re-issue album cover

Seekers Seen in Green is the sixth studio album by the Australian group the Seekers. It was released in the UK and Europe in 1967 by Columbia Records and EMI Records. It was released in Canada in 1967 and in the US in 1968 by Capitol Records. (The American release replaced "On The Other Side" with Kenny Young's "When the Good Apples Fall," their last big British hit.) It was also released in Germany and the Netherlands on LP on the Emidisc label in 1976. It was released on CD in 1999 in the UK.

It was the group's final studio album until May 1975, when the group's seventh album The Seekers was released, featuring the vocals of Louisa Wisseling.

== Reception ==
Richie Unterberger from AllMusic gave the album 3 out of 5 saying; "The pleasant folk-pop harmonic blend was seasoned by orchestration, including trombone, harpsichord, trumpet, clarinet, flute, and celeste. About half of the material was original, but Bruce Woodley penned a couple of interesting collaborations with Paul Simon ("Cloudy") and Tom Paxton ("Angeline Is Always Friday")."

== Track listing ==
Side 1

1. "Love Is Kind, Love Is Wine" (Bruce Woodley) – 2:21
2. "The Sad Cloud" (Bruce Woodley, Clive Westlake) – 3:00
3. "The 59th Street Bridge Song (Feelin' Groovy)" (Paul Simon) – 2:19
4. "If You Go Away" (Jacques Brel, Rod McKuen) – 4:02
5. "All I Can Remember" (Keith Potger) – 1:55
6. "Chase a Rainbow (Follow Your Dream)" (Bruce Woodley) – 2:28

Side 2

1. "Angeline Is Always Friday" (Bruce Woodley, Tom Paxton) – 2:40
2. "On the Other Side" (Bob Sage, Gary Osborne, Tom Springfield) – 2:11
3. "Cloudy" (Bruce Woodley, Paul Simon) – 2:19
4. "Can't Make Up My Mind" (David Reilly, Judith Durham) – 2:18
5. "Rattler" (Bruce Woodley) – 2:51
6. "Colours of My Life" (David Reilly, Judith Durham) – 2:35

== Charts ==
=== Weekly charts ===
Year	Chart	Position
1967-68	Australian Kent Music Report	2

=== Year-end charts ===
Chart (1968)	Position
Australian Albums Chart	19

== Production ==
- Arrangements: Bob Richards
- Album coverphoto: EMI archive
