= W&G Records =

Australian recording company

W&G Records was an Australian recording company that operated from the early 1950s to the 1970s. It was a subsidiary of the Melbourne precision engineering company White & Gillespie.

W&G released many significant recordings by Australian popular artists of the 1960s and also issued recordings of popular American artists, notably releases from the ABC-Paramount (Ampar) label, which W&G distributed from 1955 until 1960, when the Australian distribution was taken over by Festival Records. Recording engineer and producer Bill Armstrong worked at W&G from 1956 to 1961, prior to opening his own studio in 1965.

W&G also established a special subsidiary label, In Records, which released the classic mid-1960s recordings by the Loved Ones.

== List of W&G Records artists ==
This is a list of recording artists who have had at least one recording released on the W&G record label. In alphabetical order:

- Arthur & Mary –
- Bartholomew Plus Three – "Cause I'm Alone" / "On a Wintery Night"
- Belfast Gypsies –
- Merv Benton – "Baby Let's Play House" / "Endless Sleep"
- Bobby Bland –
- The Blarney Stones – Rocking Alone In An Old Rocking Chair (LP)
- Blanch Jewel - "By The Window" / "Christmas Kangaroo"
- Bobby Bright – "There's a Great Day a-Coming" / "Girls Never Notice Me"
- Donald Britton - plays Organ Music by British French and German Composers (LP)
- James Brown –
- Al Casey and the KCettes - "Surfin' Hootenanny"
- Pat Carroll – "To The Sun"
- Casinos –
- Johnny Chester with the Thunderbirds – "Hokey Pokey" / "Can Can Ladies"
- Contours – "Do You Love Me"
- Colin Cook –
- Frankie Davidson - "I Care for You"
- Jackie Day – "Before It's Too Late"
- Sergio de Pieri – Organ Recital — St. Patrick's Cathedral, Melbourne
- Anne Dreyer – "Storytelling Time"
- Judith Durham with Frank Traynor's Jazz Preachers – Judy Durham (EP) 1963
- John Farrar –
- Johnny Farnham –
- Martin Gale and His Old Timers – "It's Honky-Tonk Time"
- Johnny Greenwood – "Loving Arms"
- The Gospel Harmoneers - gospel quartet- 45s Gospel Rhythm and Gospel Gems, 1961
- The Haunted - "1-2-5"
- Herbie's People - "Sweet & Tender Romance" / "You Thrill Me To Pieces"
- Donald Jenkins & The Delighters – "Somebody Help Me"
- Paul Paffen – "Golden Voice Across the Valley"
- Pam French With The Ian Pearce Quartet – "You're The Cream In My Coffee" / "I Get Along Without You Very Well" (1958)
- Lotte Landl –
- Little Gulliver –
- Athol Guy – The Seekers
- Hayes Brothers & The Bluegrass Ramblers – "Great Speckled Bird" / "Hello City Limits"
- Joe Hinton –
- Joe Grech –
- Johnny Mac- Pink Champagne and a Room of Roses (1964)/ Don't Waste Time with Teardrops (1964)/I Found a Flower/Jingle Bell Rock/ Railroad Tracks
- Lynn Hope – "Morocco" / "Broken Hearted" (1954)
- Johnny Lo Piccolo (John St Peeters) –
- The Loved Ones – "The Loved One" / "Ever Loving Man" / "Sad Dark Eyes"
- Maximum Load – "Nolene"
- Russell Morris – "Hush EP" (1967)
- Paul Paffen – Golden Voice Across the Valley LP
- Bunny Paul – "I'm Hooked"
- Reg Poole – "Australian Country Music Hall of Fame Song" (1973)
- Keith Potger – The Seekers
- The Red Onion Jazz Band – The Red Onion Jazz Band (1965) LP, Hot Red Onions (1965) LP, Big Band Memories (1967) LP.
- Paul Revere & The Raiders – In the Beginning LP
- Donn Reynolds - "The Parting" / "Little Old Log Shanty" (1961)
- The Seekers – "Waltzing Matilda", The Seekers Sing Their Big Hits LP
- Kevin Shegog – "Wolverton Mountain" / "One Small Photograph" (1962)
  "Phar Lap (The Red Terror)" / "Johnny Was A Friend Of Mine" (1965)
- Tony Sheveton – "A Million Drums" / "Dance With Me" (1964)
- Ernie Sigley –
- Soul-Jers –
- Gene Summers & the Platinum Fog – "Hot Pants" / "Young Voices of Children" (1971)
- The Thunderbirds – "Wild Weekend"
- Diana Trask – "Going Steady" / "Comes Love"
- Frank Traynor's Jazz Preachers – Judy Durham with Frank Traynor's Jazz Preachers
- Webb Brothers – Clancy of the Overflow LP
- Bruce Woodley – The Seekers
- The Cherokees - "Moon in the Afternoon" (instrumental)
- The Strangers
- The Hawking Brothers
- Pam Bradley
- Pam & Ade
- Paul Anka - "Diana" / "Don't Gamble With Love" (1957) WG-SPN496 Plain yellow label with black text
- The Spotnicks - "Orange Blossom Special" / "The Spotnicks Theme" (1962) WG-S-1450 Yellow label with black text, except W&G which is in red text
- Ned Miller - "From A Jack To A King" / "Parade Of Broken Hearts" (1963) WG-S-1536 Yellow label with black text, except W&G which is in red text
- Peter Posa - "The White Rabbit" / "Honey Be My Honey Bee" (1963) WG-S-1735 Yellow label with black text, except W&G which is in red text
- The Seekers - The Seekers Sing Their Big Hits (1965) WG 25/2512 Yellow label with blue text. Original release with B&W image on album cover. A different colour photograph was used on a stereo release of this album.
- Dennis Gibbons - "The Drovers Dream" 1964
- The Breakaways - "Bonaparte's Retreat"/"You're Just in Love"
