= Kumbaya =

African-American spiritual song

"Kum ba yah"
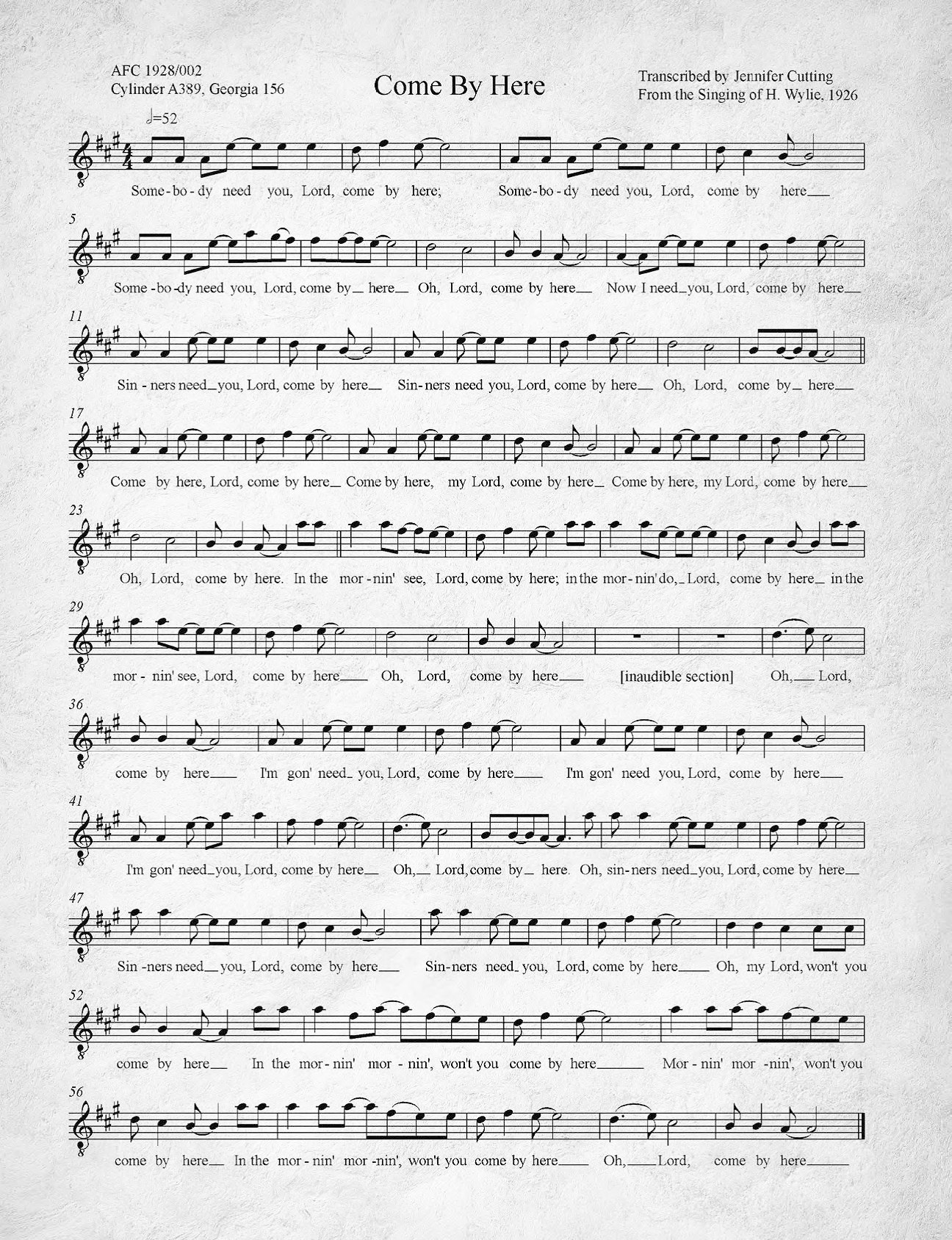
- "Come By Here", transcribed by J. Cutting from the singing of H. Wylie, 1926

Song
- Recorded: 1926, H. Wylie
- Genre: Gospel, spiritual
- Come By Here / Kum Ba Ya / Kumbaya Earliest known recording (1926)

"Kum ba yah" ("Come by here") is an African-American spiritual of disputed origin, known to have been sung in the Gullah culture of the islands off South Carolina and Georgia, with ties to enslaved Central Africans. Originally an appeal to God to come to the aid of those in need, the song is thought to have spread from the islands to other Southern states and the North, as well as to other places outside the United States.

The first known recording was made by the folklorist Robert Winslow Gordon in 1926. It features an unaccompanied tenor voice identified only as "H. Wylie" singing in the Gullah language. The piece became a standard campfire song in Scouting and summer camps and enjoyed broader popularity during the folk revival of the 1950s and 1960s. In American politics, the song title gave rise to the phrase "sing Kumbaya", commonly employed sarcastically to criticize expectations of reconciliation as unrealistic.

== Origins ==
According to the Library of Congress editor Stephen Winick, the song almost certainly originated among African Americans in the Southeastern United States. A Gullah version emerged early in its history, even if the song did not originate in that dialect. The two oldest versions whose year of origin is known for certain were both collected in 1926, and both reside in the Library's American Folklife Center. No precise month or day was recorded for either version, so either may be the earliest known version of the song. One was submitted as a high-school collecting project by a student named Minnie Lee to her teacher, Julian P. Boyd, later a professor of history at Princeton University and president of the American Historical Association. This version, collected in Alliance, North Carolina, is a manuscript featuring lyrics but no music. The other 1926 version was recorded on a wax cylinder by Robert Winslow Gordon, founder of what began as the Library of Congress Archive of Folk Song, which became the American Folklife Center. The singer's name was H. Wylie, and the song was recorded within a few hours' drive of Darien, Georgia, although Gordon did not note the exact location. Between 1926 and 1928, Gordon recorded three more versions of traditional spirituals with the refrain "come by here" or "come by heah". One of these is a different song concerning the story of Daniel in the lions' den. Of the other two, one has been lost, and one cylinder was broken, so it cannot be determined if they are versions of "Kumbaya".

According to an article in Kodaly Envoy by Lum Chee-Hoo, some time between 1922 and 1931, members of the Society for the Preservation of Spirituals collected a version from the South Carolina coast. "Come by Yuh", as they called it, was sung in Gullah, the creole language spoken by the formerly enslaved Africans and their descendants living on the Sea Islands of South Carolina and Georgia, as well as the Bahamas. It is possible this is the earliest version, if it was collected before 1926. Because the individual songs in this society's publications are not dated, however, it cannot be dated with certainty to before 1931.

In May 1936, John Lomax, Gordon's successor as head of the Archive of Folk Song, discovered a woman named Ethel Best singing "Come by Here" with a group in Raiford, Florida.

These facts contradict the longstanding copyright and authorship attribution to the white Anglo-American songwriter Reverend Marvin V. Frey (1918–1992), who claimed to have written the song circa 1936 under the title "Come By Here", inspired, he said, by a prayer he heard delivered by "Mother Duffin", a storefront evangelist in Portland, Oregon. It first appeared in this version in Revival Choruses of Marvin V. Frey, a lyric sheet printed in that city in 1939. In an interview at the Library of Congress quoted by Winick, Frey said the change of the title to "Kum Ba Yah" came about in 1946, when a missionary family named Cunningham returned from Africa. where they had sung Frey's version. According to Frey, they brought back a partly translated version, and "Kum Ba Yah" was an African phrase from Angola (specifically in Luvale). Frey said the Cunninghams then toured America singing the song with the text "Kum Ba Yah".

The story of an African origin for the phrase circulated in several versions, spread also by the revival group the Folksmiths, whose liner notes for the song stated that "Kum Ba Yah" was brought to America from Angola. As Winick points out, however:

According to Frey, then, the pronunciation "Kum Ba Yah" originated when Luvale-speaking people in Angola and Zaire translated "Come by Here" into their language. That strains credibility on several levels, primarily that "Come by Here" translated into Luvale would not be "Kum Ba Yah"; indeed, for "Come by Here" to translate to "Kum Ba Yah," the target language would have to be a creole with English as one of its main components, and no such language was common in Angola (then still a Portuguese colony) or Zaire (a country formerly colonized by Belgium, whose primary colonial language was French) in the 1930s. Moreover, the AFC's cylinder recording of H. Wylie shows that we have no need of such a story. In Wylie's dialect, which is most likely a form of Gullah, the word "here" is pronounced as "yah," rendering the song's most repeated line "come by yah," a phrase that can be phonetically rendered as either "Kum Ba Yah" or "Kumbaya."

Although it is often said that the song originated in Gullah, Winick further points out that the Boyd manuscript, which may be the earliest version of the song, was probably not collected from a Gullah speaker.

A 45-rpm recording in a contemporary gospel style was released in 1958 by Little Sugar and the Hightower Brothers as "Come by Here", on the Savoy label (backed with "At the Golden Gate").

== Folk music revival and the civil rights movement ==
The Folksmiths, including Joe Hickerson, recorded the song in 1957, as did Pete Seeger in 1958. Hickerson credited Tony Saletan, a Boston-based singer, songfinder, teacher, and children's educational television pioneer, for introducing him to "Kumbaya". (Hickerson later succeeded Gordon and Lomax at the American Folklife Center, successor to the Archive of Folk Song.) Saletan had learned it from Lynn Rohrbough, co-proprietor with his wife Katherine of the camp songbook and hymnal publisher Cooperative Recreation Service, predecessor to World Around Songs. Cooperative Recreation Service first published "Kumbaya" in its January 1956 pamphlet Song Sampler as well as the 1956 edition of Hymns of Universal Praise (for the North East Ohio Conference of the Methodist Church) and then in many others of its collections. Saletan performed the song on April 14, 1957, at the Swarthmore Folk Festival, but never recorded it; however, he can be heard singing and discussing "Kumbaya" in a 2017 podcast interview. The song enjoyed newfound popularity during the American folk music revival of the early to mid-1960s, largely due to Joan Baez's 1962 recording of the song, and became associated with the civil rights movement of that decade. For example, there is a recording of marchers singing the song as "Come By Here" during the 1965 Selma-to-Montgomery (Alabama) march for voting rights.

== Political usage ==
The title of the song is often used sarcastically in English-speaking countries, either to make fun of spirituality and interpersonal relationships or to criticize their superficiality.

Beginning in the 1990s and increasing in the following decades, references to "Kumbaya" or "singing 'Kumbaya'" entered idiomatic usage in the politics of the United States, often to suggest that someone other than the speaker is too conciliatory or eager to compromise. Richard Vatz has characterized these references to the song as sarcastic criticism of consensus "that allegedly does not examine the issues or is revelatory of cockeyed optimism."

For example, in discussing the Israeli–Palestinian conflict, U.S. President Barack Obama commented that the substantive disagreements between the parties "can't be reduced to somehow a matter of let's all hold hands and sing 'Kumbaya.'" Many other high-profile political figures have similarly referred derisively to the singing of the song as a way of expressing doubt or disparagement for potential compromise. Former Arkansas Governor Mike Huckabee explained his skepticism that ideologically aligned candidates in the 2012 Republican Party presidential primaries would unite around a single individual by saying, "there's not going to be some magic moment at which three or four of these people sit around a campfire toasting marshmallows, singing 'Kumbaya' and giving the nod to one of their competitors." Businessman and political candidate Herman Cain, speaking to a rally in 2011, said, "Singing ‘Kumbaya’ is not a foreign policy strategy."

== Lyrics ==
Version No. 1	Version No. 2	Version No. 3	Version No. 4
Kum bay ya, my Lord, kum bay ya; Kum bay ya, my Lord, kum bay ya; Kum bay ya, my Lord, kum bay ya, O Lord, kum bay ya.	Kum bay ya, my Lord, kum bay ya; Kum bay ya, my Lord, kum bay ya; Kum bay ya, my Lord, kum bay ya, O Lord, kum bay ya.	Someone need you, Lord, come by here Someone need you, Lord, come by here Someone need you, Lord, come by here Oh, Lord, come by here.	For the sun, that rises in the sky For the rhythm of the falling rain For all life, great or small For all that's true, for all you do.
Someone's laughing, my Lord, kum bay ya; Someone's laughing, my Lord, kum bay ya; Someone's laughing, my Lord, kum bay ya, O Lord, kum bay ya.	Hear me crying, my Lord, kum bay ya; Hear me crying, my Lord, kum bay ya; Hear me crying, my Lord, kum bay ya, O Lord, kum bay ya.	Now I need you, Lord, come by here Sinners need you, Lord, come by here Sinners need you, Lord, come by here Oh, Lord, come by here.	Kum bay ya, my Lord, kum bay ya; Kum bay ya, my Lord, kum bay ya; Kum bay ya, my Lord, kum bay ya, O Lord, kum bay ya.
Someone's crying, my Lord, kum bay ya; Someone's crying, my Lord, kum bay ya; Someone's crying, my Lord, kum bay ya, O Lord, kum bay ya.	Hear me singing, my Lord, kum bay ya; Hear me singing, my Lord, kum bay ya; Hear me singing, my Lord, kum bay ya, O Lord, kum bay ya.	Come by here, my Lord, come by here, Come by here, my Lord, come by here, Come by here, my Lord, come by here, Oh, Lord, come by here.	Kum bay ya, my Lord, kum bay ya; Kum bay ya, my Lord, kum bay ya; Kum bay ya, my Lord, kum bay ya, O Lord, kum bay ya.
Someone's praying, my Lord, kum bay ya; Someone's praying, my Lord, kum bay ya; Someone's praying, my Lord, kum bay ya, O Lord, kum bay ya.	Hear me praying, my Lord, kum bay ya; Hear me praying, my Lord, kum bay ya; Hear me praying, my Lord, kum bay ya, O Lord, kum bay ya.	In the mornin' see, Lord, come by here, In the mornin' see, Lord, come by here, In the mornin' see, Lord, come by here, Oh, Lord, come by here.	For the second on this world you made, For the love that will never fade, For a heart beating with joy, For all that's real, for all we feel.
Someone's singing, my Lord, kum bay ya; Someone's singing, my Lord, kum bay ya; Someone's singing, my Lord, kum bay ya, O Lord, kum bay ya.	Oh, I need you, my Lord, kum bay ya; Oh, I need you, my Lord, kum bay ya; Oh, I need you, my Lord, kum bay ya, O Lord, kum bay ya.	I gon' need you, Lord, come by here, I gon' need you, Lord, come by here, I gon' need you, Lord, come by here, Oh, Lord, come by here.	Kum bay ya, my Lord, kum bay ya; Kum bay ya, my Lord, kum bay ya; Kum bay ya, my Lord, kum bay ya, O Lord, kum bay ya.
		Oh, Sinners need you, Lord, come by here, Sinners need you, Lord, come by here, Sinners need you, Lord, come by here, Oh my Lord, won't you come by here.	Kum bay ya, my Lord, kum bay ya; Kum bay ya, my Lord, kum bay ya; Kum bay ya, my Lord, kum bay ya, O Lord, kum bay ya.
		In the morning - morning, won't you come by here Mornin' - morning, won't you come by here In the Mornin' - morning, won't you come by here Oh, Lord, come by here.	

Additional stanzas by Barry Moore (1973), in the songbook Sing and Rejoice, Herald Press (1979):

In Your Body, Lord, we are one.
In Your Body, Lord, we are one.
In Your Body, Lord, we are one.
O Lord, we are one.

In his banquet, Lord, we find strength.
In his banquet, Lord, we find strength.
In his banquet, Lord, we find strength.
O Lord, we find strength.

Draw us nearer, Lord, each to each.
Draw us nearer, Lord, each to each.
Draw us nearer, Lord, each to each.
O Lord, each to each.

Fill our mind, Lord, with Your peace.
Fill our mind, Lord, with Your peace.
Fill our mind, Lord, with Your peace.
O Lord, with Your peace.

Undivided, Lord, we shall stand.
Undivided, Lord, we shall stand.
Undivided, Lord, we shall stand.
O Lord, we shall stand.

== See also ==
- Christian child's prayer § Spirituals
- Civil rights movement in popular culture
