= A World of Our Own =

1965 single

Single by the Seekers

from the album A World of Our Own
- B-side: "Sinner Man"
- Released: 9 April 1965 (UK); 24 May 1965 (US)
- Length: 2:39
- Label: W&G Records
- Songwriter: Tom Springfield

The Seekers singles chronology
"What Have They Done to the Rain" (1965)	"A World of Our Own" (1965)	"Chilly Winds" (1965)

"A World of Our Own"

Single by Sonny James

from the album A World of Our Own
- B-side: "An Old Sweetheart of Mine"
- Released: January 1968
- Genre: Country
- Label: Capitol
- Songwriter: Tom Springfield

Sonny James singles chronology
"It's the Little Things" (1967)	"A World of Our Own" (1968)	"Heaven Says Hello" (1968)

"A World of Our Own" is a 1965 single written by Tom Springfield and was an international hit for the Australian pop group the Seekers. The single peaked at number 19 on the American Hot 100 and number 2 on the Easy Listening charts. It reached number 3 in the U.K. and number 2 in Australia.

Three years later, "A World of Our Own" was recorded by Sonny James. It was his sixth number one in a row, and 26th hit on the U.S. country music chart. The single spent three weeks at number one and a total of 17 weeks on the chart.

In 1994 the Seekers single was re-released in the UK. The four-track CD contained the original recording, a new recording of the song, and two B-sides - When the Stars begin to fall (originally the B-side of Morningtown Ride and the newly-recorded Keep a dream in your pocket.

== Chart performance ==
=== The Seekers ===
Chart (1965)	Peak position
Australia (Kent Music Report)	2
Canada RPM Top Singles	5
Canada RPM Adult Contemporary	4
Ireland IRMA	2
UK Singles Chart	3
Singapore	2
South Africa (Springbok Radio)	1
Malaysia	9
Netherlands Single Top 100	19
U.S. Billboard Easy Listening	2
U.S. Billboard Hot 100	19
Rhodesia Lyons Maid Hits Of The Week	1

=== Sonny James ===
Chart (1968)	Peak position
U.S. Billboard Hot Country Singles	1
Canadian RPM Country Tracks	1
