= Georgy Girl (song) =

Single by the Seekers

from the album Come the Day
- B-side: "The Last Thing on My Mind" (Europe) "When the Stars Begin to Fall" (non-Europe)
- Released: 1966
- Genre: Folk-pop; easy listening
- Length: 2:21
- Label: EMI Columbia (DB 8134) (UK); EMI Capitol (5756) (US)
- Composer: Tom Springfield
- Lyricist: Jim Dale

The Seekers singles chronology
"Morningtown Ride" (1966)	"Georgy Girl" (1966)	"When Will the Good Apples Fall" (1966)

Audio
- "Georgy Girl (remaster)" on YouTube

"Georgy Girl" is a song by the Australian pop/folk music group the Seekers. It was used as the title song for the 1966 British romantic comedy film Georgy Girl. Tom Springfield, who had written "I'll Never Find Another You" for the Seekers, composed the music and Jim Dale supplied the lyrics. The song is heard at both the beginning and end of the film, with markedly different lyrics (and with different lyrics again from those in the commercially released version). It was nominated for an Academy Award for Best Original Song but the prize went to "Born Free". It was performed at the 1967 Oscars ceremony by Mitzi Gaynor.

The song became a hit in late 1966 and early 1967, reaching number one in Australia and number three in the United Kingdom. In the United States, it was the Seekers' highest-charting single, reaching number one on the Cash Box Top 100. "Georgy Girl" reached number two on the Billboard Hot 100; "I'm a Believer" by the Monkees kept the song from number one. The song's U.S. success prompted the Seekers' British album Come the Day to be retitled Georgy Girl for its American release.

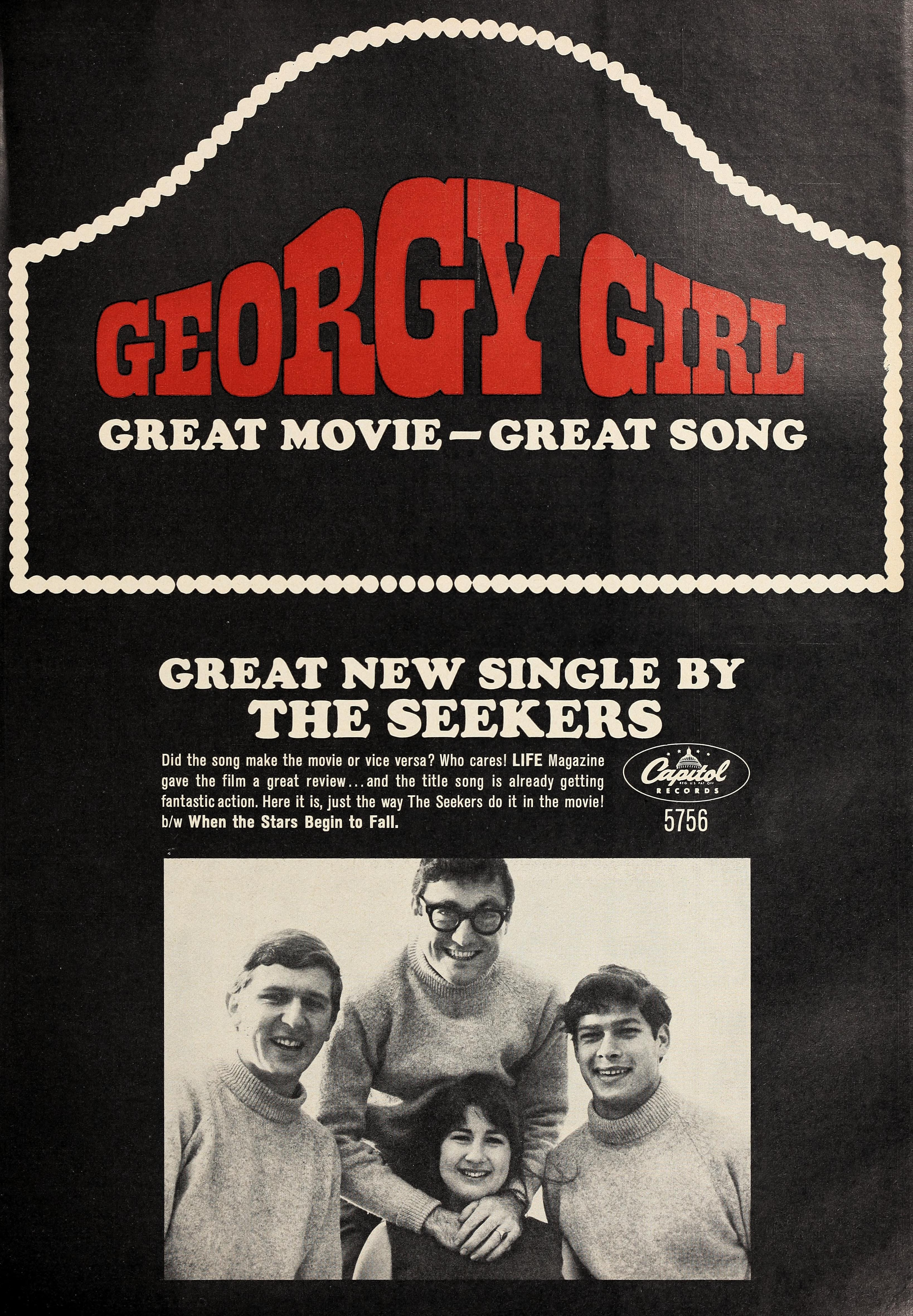
Cashbox advertisement, November 26, 1966

== Charts ==
=== Weekly charts ===
Chart (1966–1967)	Peak position
Australia (Kent Music Report)	1
Canada RPM Top Singles	1
Ireland (IRMA)	10
New Zealand (Listener)	1
South Africa (Springbok)	10
UK (The Official Charts Company)	3
US Billboard Hot 100	2
US Billboard Adult Contemporary	7
US Cash Box Top 100	1

=== Year-end charts ===
Chart (1967)	Rank
Canada	15
US Billboard Hot 100	57
US Cash Box Top 100	11

== Certifications ==
Region	Certification	Certified units/sales
United States (RIAA)	Gold	1,000,000^{^}
^{^} Shipments figures based on certification alone.

== Cover versions ==
In 1966, The Lennon Sisters recorded a cover of this song as well, which did not chart as well as the original song. It was performed by the sisters on The Lawrence Welk Show.

In 1967, an instrumental version by the Baja Marimba Band reached number 98 on the US Billboard Hot 100 chart and number 14 on the easy listening chart.

The New Seekers, a reorganized group from 1969 with guitarist Keith Potger, released a version of the song on the UK version of the album We'd Like to Teach the World to Sing.

In 1971 Saori Minami recorded a cover of the song for her second album Shiokaze No Melody.

In the 1996 episode Lisa the Beauty Queen, Homer Simpson sang "Hey there Blimpy boy" - a parody of the song.
