= Morningtown Ride =

Lullaby written by Malvina Reynolds

Single by the Seekers

from the album Hide & Seekers
- B-side: "When the Stars Begin to Fall"
- Released: 1966
- Genre: Folk; folk-pop; lullaby
- Length: 2:36
- Label: Columbia
- Songwriter: Malvina Reynolds
- Producer: Tom Springfield

Music video
- "Morningtown Ride" - (Stereo, 1966) on YouTube

"Morningtown Ride" is a lullaby, written and performed by American singer Malvina Reynolds. It was covered by the Australian pop group the Seekers and their recording reached No. 2 on the UK Singles Chart. The song tells the comforting story of the journey through nighttime made by all the "little travellers" (children), on board a train, with the Sandman as guard.

== The Seekers version ==
The song was performed by the Seekers with Bobby Richards and his Orchestra on the 1964 album Hide & Seekers (W&G Records WG-B-2362). It was subsequently re-recorded and released as a single in 1966 (Columbia DB 8060), produced by Tom Springfield.

The song spent 15 weeks on the UK Singles Chart, reaching No. 2 on 28 December 1966. In the United States, the song spent seven weeks on the Billboard Hot 100, peaking at No. 44, while reaching No. 13 on Billboard's Easy Listening chart.

=== Charts ===
Chart (1966–67)	Peak position
Ireland (IRMA)	2
Malaysia	4
South Africa	9
UK Singles (Official Charts)	2
US Billboard Hot 100	44
US Adult Contemporary (Billboard)	13

== Other versions ==
- The Irish Rovers recorded versions of the song, which were released on the 1972 album The Irish Rovers Live and the 1976 album Children of the Unicorn. In 1973, the Irish Rovers' version reached No. 83 on Canada's RPM 100 and No. 39 on RPM's Adult Contemporary Playlist.
- Brendan Grace recorded a version of the song, which reached No. 25 on the Irish Singles Chart on 6 January 1985.

== See also ==
- Morningtown Ride to Christmas, 2001 album by the Seekers
- List of train songs
