= Lists of UK top-ten albums =

Lists of UK top-ten albums is a series of lists showing all the albums that have reached the top 10 (top 5 in 1956, 1957 and until 8 November 1958) on the UK Albums Chart in a particular year. Before 1969, there was no single officially recognised chart, but the Record Mirror (from 22 July 1956), Melody Maker (8 November 1958 to March 1960) and Record Retailer (1960 to 1969) are considered the canonical source for the data.

== 1950s ==
- 1956
- 1957
- 1958
- 1959

== 1960s ==
- 1960
- 1961
- 1962
- 1963
- 1964
- 1965
- 1966
- 1967
- 1968
- 1969

== 1970s ==
- 1970
- 1971
- 1972
- 1973
- 1974
- 1975
- 1976
- 1977
- 1978
- 1979

== 1980s ==
- 1980
- 1981
- 1982
- 1983
- 1984
- 1985
- 1986
- 1987
- 1988
- 1989

== 1990s ==
- 1990
- 1991
- 1992
- 1993
- 1994
- 1995
- 1996
- 1997
- 1998
- 1999

== 2000s ==
- 2000
- 2001
- 2002
- 2003
- 2004
- 2005
- 2006
- 2007
- 2008
- 2009

== 2010s ==
- 2010
- 2011
- 2012
- 2013
- 2014
- 2015
- 2016
- 2017
- 2018
- 2019

== 2020s ==
- 2020
- 2021
- 2022
- 2023
- 2024
- 2025
- 2026
