= List of UK top-ten albums in 1964 =

The UK Albums Chart is one of many music charts compiled by the Official Charts Company that calculates the best-selling albums of the week in the United Kingdom. Before 2004, the chart was only based on the sales of physical albums. This list shows albums that peaked in the Top 10 of the UK Albums Chart during 1964, as well as albums which peaked in 1963 and 1965 but were in the top 10 in 1964. The entry date is when the album appeared in the top ten for the first time (week ending, as published by the Official Charts Company, which is six days after the chart is announced).

The first new number-one album of the year was by The Rolling Stones by The Rolling Stones. Overall, four different albums peaked at number one in 1964, with The Beatles (3) having the most albums hit that position.

== Top-ten albums ==
Key

Symbol	Meaning
‡	Album peaked in 1958, 1962 or 1963 but still in chart in 1964.
♦	Album released in 1964 but peaked in 1965.
Entered	The date that the album first appeared in the chart.
Peak	Highest position that the album reached in the UK Albums Chart.

Entered (week ending)	Weeks in top 10	Single	Artist	Peak	Peak reached (week ending)	Weeks at peak
Albums in 1958
3 May 1958	276	South Pacific: Original Soundtrack ‡	Various artists	1	8 November 1958	115
Albums in 1962
24 March 1962	153	West Side Story: Original Soundtrack ‡	Various artists	1	23 June 1962	13
Albums in 1963
6 April 1963	62	Please Please Me ‡	The Beatles	1	11 May 1963	30
22 June 1963	40	The Shadows' Greatest Hits ‡	The Shadows	2	13 July 1963	8
17 August 1963	36	Meet The Searchers ‡	The Searchers	2	7 September 1963	9
14 September 1963	17	Kenny Ball's Golden Hits ‡	Kenny Ball and his Jazzmen	4	28 September 1963	2
28 September 1963	27	Born Free ‡	Frank Ifield	3	19 October 1963	3
26 October 1963	27	How Do You Like It? ‡	Gerry and the Pacemakers	2	16 November 1963	2
16 November 1963	21	Freddie and the Dreamers	Freddie and the Dreamers	4	11 January 1964	2
16 November 1963	4	Trini Lopez at PJ's ‡	Trini Lopez	7	7 December 1963	1
23 November 1963	7	Sugar and Spice ‡	The Searchers	5	7 December 1963	1
30 November 1963	44	With the Beatles ‡	The Beatles	1	7 December 1963	21
7 December 1963	20	In Dreams ‡	Roy Orbison	6	21 December 1963	2
28 December 1963	4	On Tour with the George Mitchell Minstrels	The George Mitchell Minstrels	6	11 January 1964	1
Albums in 1964
4 January 1964	1	More Chuck Berry	Chuck Berry	9	4 January 1964	1
1 February 1964	5	Fun in Acapulco	Elvis Presley	9	1 February 1964	2
29 February 1964	18	Stay with The Hollies	The Hollies	2	25 April 1964	1
11 April 1964	8	Elvis' Golden Records Volume 3	Elvis Presley	6	18 April 1964	2
18 April 1964	6	Blue Gene	Gene Pitney	7	9 May 1964	1
18 April 1964	1	Blue Skies	Frank Ifield	10	18 April 1964	1
25 April 1964	42	The Rolling Stones	The Rolling Stones	1	2 May 1964	12
25 April 1964	11	A Session with The Dave Clark Five	The Dave Clark Five	3	23 May 1964	1
2 May 1964	10	A Girl Called Dusty	Dusty Springfield	6	23 May 1964	2
16 May 1964	15	Dance with The Shadows	The Shadows	2	13 June 1964	2
30 May 1964	5	The Latest and the Greatest	Chuck Berry	8	13 June 1964	1
6 June 1964	11	It's The Searchers	The Searchers	4	20 June 1964	2
20 June 1964	9	Showcase	Buddy Holly	3	27 June 1964	1
4 July 1964	40	The Bachelors and 16 Great Songs	The Bachelors	2	26 December 1964	4
4 July 1964	16	Kissin' Cousins	Elvis Presley	5	8 August 1964	1
18 July 1964	19	Wonderful Life	Cliff Richard with The Shadows	2	18 July 1964	1
18 July 1964	32	A Hard Day's Night	The Beatles	1	25 July 1964	21
22 August 1964	14	Gentleman Jim	Jim Reeves	3	12 September 1964	1
29 August 1964	3	A Touch of Velvet	Jim Reeves	8	5 September 1964	1
12 September 1964	16	Moonlight and Roses	Jim Reeves	2	26 September 1964	3
19 September 1964	13	The Five Faces of Manfred Mann	Manfred Mann	3	3 October 1964	2
3 October 1964	1	God Be With You	Jim Reeves	10	3 October 1964	1
10 October 1964	1	Camelot (Original Broadway Cast)	Original Broadway Cast of Camelot	10	10 October 1964	1
17 October 1964	22	Kinks	The Kinks	3	5 December 1964	2
24 October 1964	1	Good 'N' Country	Jim Reeves	10	24 October 1964	1
21 November 1964	13	The Animals	The Animals	6	5 December 1964	2
5 December 1964	5	Twelve Songs of Christmas	Jim Reeves	4	26 December 1964	2
12 December 1964	37	Beatles for Sale	The Beatles	1	19 December 1964	11
12 December 1964	10	Oh, Pretty Woman ♦	Roy Orbison	5	9 January 1965	1
19 December 1964	1	Greatest Hits	Frank Ifield	9	19 December 1964	1
19 December 1964	20	The Lucky 13 Shades of Val Doonican ♦	Val Doonican	2	23 January 1965	1
26 December 1964	3	Spotlight on The George Mitchell Minstrels	The George Mitchell Minstrels	6	26 December 1964	2

== See also ==
- 1964 in British music
- List of number-one albums from the 1960s (UK)
