= List of UK top-ten albums in 1963 =

The UK Albums Chart is one of many music charts compiled by the Official Charts Company that calculates the best-selling albums of the week in the United Kingdom. Before 2004, the chart was only based on the sales of physical albums. This list shows albums that peaked in the Top 10 of the UK Albums Chart during 1963, as well as albums which peaked in 1962 and 1964 but were in the top 10 in 1963. The entry date is when the album appeared in the top ten for the first time (week ending, as published by the Official Charts Company, which is six days after the chart is announced).

The first new number-one album of the year was by Summer Holiday by Cliff Richard and The Shadows. Overall, three different albums peaked at number one in 1963, with The Beatles (2) having the most albums hit that position.

== Top-ten albums ==
Key

Symbol	Meaning
‡	Album peaked in 1958, 1959, 1961 or 1962 but still in chart in 1963.
♦	Album released in 1963 but peaked in 1964.
Entered	The date that the album first appeared in the chart.
Peak	Highest position that the album reached in the UK Albums Chart.

Entered (week ending)	Weeks in top 10	Single	Artist	Peak	Peak reached (week ending)	Weeks at peak
Albums in 1958
3 May 1958	276	South Pacific: Original Soundtrack ‡	Various artists	1	8 November 1958	115
Albums in 1959
2 May 1959	43	The Buddy Holly Story ‡	Buddy Holly	2	16 May 1959	1
Albums in 1960
26 November 1960	24	The Black and White Minstrel Show ‡	The George Mitchell Minstrels	1	29 July 1961	8
Albums in 1961
28 October 1961	24	Another Black and White Minstrel Show ‡	The George Mitchell Minstrels	1	11 November 1961	8
9 December 1961	47	Blue Hawaii ‡	Elvis Presley	1	6 January 1962	18
Albums in 1962
24 March 1962	153	West Side Story: Original Soundtrack ‡	Various artists	1	23 June 1962	13
1 September 1962	20	A Golden Age of Donegan ‡	Lonnie Donegan	3	22 September 1962	3
8 September 1962	19	A Picture of You ‡	Joe Brown and the Bruvvers	3	8 September 1962	2
6 October 1962	13	32 Minutes and 17 Seconds with Cliff Richard ‡	Cliff Richard with The Shadows and Norrie Paramor & His Orchestra	3	3 November 1962	1
13 October 1962	29	Out of the Shadows ‡	The Shadows	1	27 October 1962	7
27 October 1962	17	On Stage with the George Mitchell Minstrels ‡	The George Mitchell Minstrels	1	1 December 1962	2
10 November 1962	21	Bobby Vee Meets the Crickets	Bobby Vee and The Crickets	2	12 January 1963	1
15 December 1962	14	Rock 'N' Roll No. 2	Elvis Presley	3	26 January 1963	1
Albums in 1963
26 January 1963	31	Summer Holiday	Cliff Richard and The Shadows	1	2 February 1963	14
2 February 1963	18	Girls! Girls! Girls!	Elvis Presley	2	9 February 1963	6
2 February 1963	2	A Bobby Vee Recording Session	Bobby Vee	10	9 February 1963	2
16 February 1963	32	I'll Remember You	Frank Ifield	3	2 March 1963	3
2 March 1963	15	Sinatra–Basie: An Historic Musical First	Frank Sinatra and Count Basie	2	23 March 1963	3
16 March 1963	12	All Star Festival: The Unique Record in Aid of the World's Refugees	Various artists	4	13 April 1963	1
23 March 1963	3	Richard Chamberlain Sings	Richard Chamberlain	8	30 March 1963	1
6 April 1963	62	Please Please Me	The Beatles	1	11 May 1963	30
6 April 1963	26	Reminiscing	Buddy Holly	2	13 April 1963	3
4 May 1963	4	All Alone Am I	Brenda Lee	8	11 May 1963	1
11 May 1963	6	Hats Off to Del Shannon	Del Shannon	9	11 May 1963	4
18 May 1963	17	It Happened at the World's Fair	Elvis Presley	4	25 May 1963	7
1 June 1963	13	Billy	Billy Fury	6	8 June 1963	1
22 June 1963	40	The Shadows' Greatest Hits	The Shadows	2	13 July 1963	8
13 July 1963	1	Bobby Vee's Golden Greats	Bobby Vee	10	13 July 1963	1
20 July 1963	14	Cliff's Hit Album	Cliff Richard	2	17 August 1963	1
10 August 1963	9	The Concert Sinatra	Frank Sinatra	8	21 September 1963	1
17 August 1963	36	Meet The Searchers	The Searchers	2	7 September 1963	9
14 September 1963	17	Kenny Ball's Golden Hits	Kenny Ball and his Jazzmen	4	28 September 1963	2
14 September 1963	9	Steptoe and Son	Wilfrid Brambell and Harry H. Corbett	4	21 September 1963	1
28 September 1963	27	Born Free	Frank Ifield	3	19 October 1963	3
5 October 1963	3	When in Spain	Cliff Richard	8	19 October 1963	1
12 October 1963	1	Fool Britannia	Peter Sellers, Joan Collins and Anthony Newley	10	12 October 1963	1
19 October 1963	2	Chuck Berry on Stage	Chuck Berry	6	26 October 1963	2
26 October 1963	3	Sinatra's Sinatra	Frank Sinatra	7	2 November 1963	1
26 October 1963	27	How Do You Like It?	Gerry and the Pacemakers	2	16 November 1963	2
16 November 1963	21	Freddie and the Dreamers ♦	Freddie and the Dreamers	4	11 January 1964	2
16 November 1963	4	Trini Lopez at PJ's	Trini Lopez	7	7 December 1963	1
23 November 1963	7	Sugar and Spice	The Searchers	5	7 December 1963	1
30 November 1963	44	With the Beatles	The Beatles	1	7 December 1963	21
7 December 1963	20	In Dreams	Roy Orbison	6	21 December 1963	2
28 December 1963	4	On Tour with the George Mitchell Minstrels ♦	The George Mitchell Minstrels	6	11 January 1964	1

== See also ==
- 1963 in British music
- List of number-one albums from the 1960s (UK)
