= List of UK top-ten albums in 1962 =

The UK Albums Chart is one of many music charts compiled by the Official Charts Company that calculates the best-selling albums of the week in the United Kingdom. Before 2004, the chart was only based on the sales of physical albums. This list shows albums that peaked in the top 10 of the UK Albums Chart during 1962, as well as albums which peaked in 1961 and 1963 but were in the top 10 in 1962. The entry date is when the album appeared in the top ten for the first time (week ending, as published by the Official Charts Company, which is six days after the chart is announced).

Thirty-nine albums were in the top ten this year. One album from 1958, two from 1960 and ten albums from 1961 remained in the top 10 for several weeks at the beginning of the year, while Bobby Vee Meets the Crickets by Bobby Vee and The Crickets, and Rock 'N' Roll No. 2 by Elvis Presley were both released in 1962 but did not reach their peak until 1963. The Best of Barber and Bilk Volume 2 by Chris Barber and Acker Bilk, The Black and White Minstrel Show by The George Mitchell Minstrels, Blue Hawaii by Elvis Presley, Ring-a-Ding-Ding! by Frank Sinatra and The Young Ones by Cliff Richard were the albums from 1961 to reach their peak in 1962. Ten artists scored multiple entries in the top 10 in 1962. Bobby Vee, Karl Denver, Kenny Ball, Ray Charles and The Temperance Seven were among the many artists who achieved their first UK charting top 10 album in 1962.

The first number-one album of the year was Blue Hawaii by Elvis Presley. Overall, eight different albums peaked at number-one in 1962, with Elvis Presley (2) having the most albums hit that position.

== Background ==
=== Multiple entries ===
Thirty-nine albums charted in the top 10 in 1962, with twenty-nine albums reaching their peak this year (including The Buddy Holly Story, The King and I and West Side Story, which charted in previous years but reached a peak on their latest chart run).

Ten artists scored multiple entries in the top 10 in 1962. Acker Bilk secured four top-ten albums, Chris Barber, Elvis Presley, Frank Sinatra, The George Mitchell Minstrels and The Shadows all had three top ten entries, while Bobby Vee, Cliff Richard, The Crickets and Dorothy Provine were the acts who had two top 10 albums this year.

=== Chart debuts ===
Ten artists achieved their first top 10 album in 1962 as a lead artist: The Bruvvers, George Shearing, Helen Shapiro, Joe Brown, Karl Denver, Kenny Ball, Norrie Paramor, Ray Charles and The Temperance Seven; Bobby Vee had one more entry in his breakthrough year.

The following table (collapsed on desktop site) does not include acts who had previously charted as part of a group and secured their first top 10 solo album, or featured appearances on compilations or other artists recordings.

Artist	Number of top 10s	First entry	Chart position	Other entries
Karl Denver	1	Wimoweh	7	—
The Temperance Seven	1	The Temperance Seven 1961	8	—
Bobby Vee	2	Take Good Care of My Baby	7	Bobby Vee Meets the Crickets (2) ^{[A]}
Helen Shapiro	1	'Tops' with Me	2	—
Ray Charles	1	Modern Sounds in Country and Western Music	6	—
Kenny Ball	1	The Best of Ball, Barber and Bilk	1	—
Joe Brown	1	"A Picture of You"	3	—
The Bruvvers	1	"A Picture of You"	3	—
Norrie Paramor	1	32 Minutes and 17 Seconds with Cliff Richard	3	—
George Shearing	1	Nat King Cole Sings/George Shearing Plays	8	—

=== Soundtracks ===
Cast recordings from various films and musicals made the top five this year. These included Blitz!, It's Trad, Dad!, The King and I and West Side Story.

== Top-ten albums ==
Key

Symbol	Meaning
‡	Album peaked between 1958 and 1961 but still in chart in 1962.
♦	Album released in 1962 but peaked in 1963.
(#)	Year-end top-ten album position and rank
Entered	The date that the album first appeared in the chart.
Peak	Highest position that the album reached in the UK Albums Chart.

Entered (week ending)	Weeks in top 10	Single	Artist	Peak	Peak reached (week ending)	Weeks at peak
Albums in 1958
3 May 1958	276	South Pacific: Original Soundtrack ‡ ^{[B]}	Various artists	1	8 November 1958	115
Albums in 1959
2 May 1959	43	The Buddy Holly Story ‡ ^{[C]}	Buddy Holly and The Crickets	2	16 May 1959	1
Albums in 1960
10 September 1960	55	Oliver! ‡ ^{[D]}	Original London Cast	4	21 October 1961	1
26 November 1960	120	The Black and White Minstrel Show ‡	The George Mitchell Minstrels	1	29 July 1961	9
Albums in 1961
3 June 1961	22	The Best of Barber and Bilk Volume 1 ‡ ^{[E]}	Chris Barber and Acker Bilk	4	1 July 1961	9
19 August 1961	37	The Sound of Music ‡ ^{[F]}	Original London Cast	3	21 October 1961	1
16 September 1961	51	The Shadows ‡ ^{[G]}	The Shadows	1	23 September 1961	5
28 October 1961	24	Another Black and White Minstrel Show ‡ ^{[H]}	The George Mitchell Minstrels	1	11 November 1961	8
4 November 1961	10	Something for Everybody ‡ ^{[I]}	Elvis Presley	2	11 November 1961	2
2 December 1961	2	The Best of Barber and Bilk Volume 2	Chris Barber and Acker Bilk	8	6 January 1962	1
9 December 1961	47	Blue Hawaii	Elvis Presley	1	6 January 1962	18
16 December 1961	26	The Roaring 20's: Songs from the TV Series ‡	Dorothy Provine	3	30 December 1961	2
23 December 1961	30	The Young Ones	Cliff Richard	1	13 January 1962	6
30 December 1961	4	Ring-a-Ding-Ding!	Frank Sinatra	8	13 January 1962	1
Albums in 1962
20 January 1962	13	Wimoweh ^{[J]}	Karl Denver	7	10 March 1962	2
27 January 1962	1	The King and I: Original Soundtrack ^{[K]}	Various artists	9	27 January 1962	1
3 February 1962	3	The Temperance Seven 1961	The Temperance Seven	8	10 February 1962	1
10 February 1962	4	Vamp from The Roaring 20's ^{[L]}	Dorothy Provine	9	17 February 1962	2
24 February 1962	3	West Side Story ^{[M]}	Original Broadway Cast	3	17 March 1962	1
3 March 1962	1	Take Good Care of My Baby	Bobby Vee	7	3 March 1962	1
17 March 1962	14	'Tops' with Me	Helen Shapiro	2	31 March 1962	1
24 March 1962	153	West Side Story: Original Soundtrack	Various artists	1	23 June 1962	13
28 April 1962	1	I Remember Tommy	Frank Sinatra	10	28 April 1962	1
5 May 1962	17	It's Trad, Dad!: Original Soundtrack ^{[N]}	Various artists	3	26 May 1962	2
16 June 1962	9	Sinatra and Strings	Frank Sinatra	6	7 July 1962	3
23 June 1962	10	Stranger on the Shore	Mr Acker Bilk	6	21 July 1962	1
14 July 1962	20	Pot Luck ^{[O]}	Elvis Presley	1	28 July 1962	6
21 July 1962	6	Blitz!	Original London Cast	7	21 July 1962	1
18 August 1962	1	Modern Sounds in Country and Western Music	Ray Charles	6	18 August 1962	1
18 August 1962	6	Twistin' 'N' Twangin ^{[P]}	Duane Eddy	8	18 August 1962	2
1 September 1962	17	Best of Ball, Barber and Bilk ^{[Q]}	Kenny Ball, Chris Barber & Acker Bilk	1	22 September 1962	3
1 September 1962	20	A Golden Age of Donegan ^{[R]}	Lonnie Donegan	3	22 September 1962	3
8 September 1962	19	A Picture of You ^{[S]}	Joe Brown and the Bruvvers	3	8 September 1962	2
6 October 1962	13	32 Minutes and 17 Seconds with Cliff Richard ^{[T]}	Cliff Richard with The Shadows & Norrie Paramor & His Orchestra	3	3 November 1962	1
13 October 1962	29	Out of the Shadows	The Shadows	1	27 October 1962	7
27 October 1962	17	On Stage with the George Mitchell Minstrels	The George Mitchell Minstrels	1	1 December 1962	2
3 November 1962	1	Nat King Cole Sings/George Shearing Plays	Nat King Cole and George Shearing	8	3 November 1962	1
10 November 1962	21	Bobby Vee Meets the Crickets ♦	Bobby Vee and The Crickets	2	12 January 1963	1
15 December 1962	14	Rock 'N' Roll No. 2 ♦ ^{[U]}	Elvis Presley	3	26 January 1963	1

== Entries by artist ==
The following table shows artists who achieved two or more top 10 entries in 1962, including albums that reached their peak between 1959 and 1961, or 1963. The figures only include main artists, with featured artists and appearances on compilation albums not counted individually for each artist. The total number of weeks an artist spent in the top ten in 1962 is also shown.

Entries	Artist	Weeks	Albums
4	Acker Bilk ^{[V]}^{[W]}	29	The Best of Barber and Bilk Volume 1, The Best of Barber and Bilk Volume 2, The Best of Barber, Ball and Bilk, Stranger on the Shore
3	Chris Barber ^{[V]}^{[W]}	19	The Best of Barber and Bilk Volume 1, The Best of Barber and Bilk Volume 2, The Best of Barber, Ball and Bilk
3	Elvis Presley ^{[V]}^{[W]}^{[X]}	47	Blue Hawaii, Pot Luck, Something for Everybody
3	Frank Sinatra ^{[W]}	13	I Remember Tommy, Ring-a-Ding-Ding!, Sinatra and Strings
3	The George Mitchell Minstrels ^{[V]}^{[Y]}	52	Another Black and White Minstrel Show, The Black and White Minstrel Show, On Stage with the George Mitchell Minstrels
3	The Shadows ^{[V]}	48	32 Minutes and 17 Seconds with Cliff Richard, Out of the Shadows, The Shadows
2	Bobby Vee ^{[X]}	22	Bobby Vee Meets the Crickets, Take Good Care of My Baby
2	Cliff Richard ^{[W]}	37	32 Minutes and 17 Seconds with Cliff Richard, The Young Ones
2	The Crickets ^{[X]}^{[Z]}	9	Bobby Vee Meets the Crickets, The Buddy Holly Story
2	Dorothy Provine ^{[V]}	26	The Roaring 20's: Songs from the TV Series, Vamp from The Roaring 20's

== Notes ==
- ^{a} Bobby Vee Meets the Crickets reached its peak of number two on 12 January 1963 (week ending).
- ^{b} South Pacific: Original Soundtrack re-entered the top 10 at number 9 on 24 November 1962 (week ending) for 21 weeks, at number 10 on 27 April 1963 (week ending) for 5 weeks, at number 10 on 15 June 1963 (week ending), at number 9 on 29 June 1963 (week ending) for 6 weeks, at number 10 on 21 December 1963 (week ending), at number 10 on 4 January 1964 (week ending) for 3 weeks, at number 10 on 8 February 1964 (week ending), at number 10 on 21 March 1964 (week ending) for 2 weeks, at number 8 on 11 April 1964 (week ending) for 2 weeks and at number 9 on 9 May 1964 (week ending).
- ^{c} The Buddy Holly Story originally peaked at number two upon its initial release in 1959. It re-entered the top 10 at number 10 on 24 March 1962 (week ending) and at number 10 on 23 February 1963 (week ending).
- ^{d} Oliver! re-entered the top 10 at number 6 on 10 February 1962 (week ending) for three weeks and at number 10 on 2 June 1962 (week ending).
- ^{e} The Best of Barber and Bilk Volume 1 re-entered the top 10 at number 7 on 3 February 1962 (week ending).
- ^{f} The Sound of Music re-entered the top 10 at number 7 on 21 April 1962 (week ending) for two weeks, at number 7 on 12 May 1962 (week ending) for three weeks, at number 8 on 9 June 1962 (week ending) and at number 10 on 22 September 1962 (week ending).
- ^{g} The Shadows re-entered the top 10 at number 6 on 13 January 1962 (week ending) for 17 weeks, at number 8 on 19 May 1962 (week ending) for two weeks, at number 10 on 9 June 1962 (week ending) for six weeks and at number 9 on 28 July 1962 (week ending) for eleven weeks.
- ^{h} Another Black and White Minstrel Show re-entered the top 10 at number 9 on 22 December 1962 (week ending) for three weeks.
- ^{i} Something for Everybody re-entered the top 10 at number 10 on 13 January 1962 (week ending) and at number 10 on 27 January 1962 (week ending).
- ^{j} Wimoweh re-entered the top 10 at number 8 on 17 February 1962 (week ending), at number 9 on 3 March 1962 (week ending) for three weeks, at number 7 on 7 April 1962 (week ending) for three weeks, at number 9 on 5 May 1962 (week ending) for two weeks and at number 9 on 2 June 1962 (week ending).
- ^{k} The King and I: Original Soundtrack originally peaked at number-one upon its initial release in 1956.
- ^{l} Vamp from The Roaring 20's re-entered the top 10 at number 10 on 10 March 1962 (week ending).
- ^{m} West Side Story originally peaked at number 6 upon its initial release in 1959.
- ^{n} It's Trad, Dad!: Original Soundtrack re-entered the top 10 at number 10 on 25 August 1962 (week ending) for two weeks.
- ^{o} Pot Luck re-entered the top 10 at number 10 on 8 December 1962 (week ending).
- ^{p} Twistin' and Twangin re-entered the top 10 at number 10 on 29 September 1962 (week ending).
- ^{q} The Best of Barber, Ball and Bilk re-entered the top 10 at number 8 on 29 December 1962 (week ending).
- ^{r} A Golden Age of Donegan re-entered the top 10 at number 9 on 12 January 1963 (week ending) for two weeks.
- ^{s} A Picture of You re-entered the top 10 at number 9 on 19 January 1963 (week ending) for two weeks.
- ^{t} 32 Minutes and 17 Seconds with Cliff Richard re-entered the top 10 at number 10 on 5 January 1963 (week ending) for four weeks.
- ^{u} Rock 'N' Roll No. 2 originally peaked at number 3 upon its initial release in 1957. It was re-issued by RCA Victor in 1962 and re-appeared in the expanded top 10 from 15 December 1962 (week ending) for fourteen weeks, including a second week at its peak of number 3 on 26 January 1963 (week ending). This gave it a total of 17 weeks in the top 10 overall.
- ^{v} Figure includes album that peaked in 1961.
- ^{w} Figure includes album that first charted in 1961 but peaked in 1962.
- ^{x} Figure includes album that peaked in 1963.
- ^{y} Figure includes album that peaked in 1960.
- ^{z} Figure includes album that peaked in 1959.

== See also ==
- 1962 in British music
- List of number-one albums from the 1960s (UK)
