= List of UK top-ten albums in 1969 =

The UK Albums Chart is one of many music charts compiled by the Official Charts Company that calculates the best-selling albums of the week in the United Kingdom. Before 2004, the chart was only based on the sales of physical albums. This list shows albums that peaked in the Top 10 of the UK Albums Chart during 1969, as well as albums which peaked in 1968 and 1970 but were in the top 10 in 1969. The entry date is when the album appeared in the top ten for the first time (week ending, as published by the Official Charts Company, which is six days after the chart is announced).

The first new number-one album of the year was by The Best of The Seekers by The Seekers. Overall, twelve different albums peaked at number one in 1969, with The Beatles (2) having the most albums hit that position.

== Top-ten albums ==
Key

Symbol	Meaning
‡	Album peaked in 1965 or 1968 but still in chart in 1969.
♦	Album released in 1969 but peaked in 1970.
Entered	The date that the album first appeared in the chart.
Peak	Highest position that the album reached in the UK Albums Chart.

Entered (week ending)	Weeks in top 10	Single	Artist	Peak	Peak reached (week ending)	Weeks at peak
Albums in 1965
17 April 1965	233	The Sound of Music: Original Soundtrack ‡	Various artists	1	5 June 1965	70
Albums in 1967
15 July 1967	24	Live at The Talk of the Town ‡	Tom Jones	6	16 November 1968	1
Albums in 1968
3 February 1968	18	The Four Tops Greatest Hits ‡	Four Tops	1	10 February 1968	1
3 February 1968	24	The Supremes: Greatest Hits ‡	The Supremes	1	17 February 1968	3
25 May 1968	18	The Jungle Book: Original Soundtrack ‡	Various artists	5	29 June 1968	1
10 August 1968	21	Bookends ‡	Simon & Garfunkel	1	17 August 1968	7
10 August 1968	16	A Man Without Love ‡	Engelbert Humperdinck	3	31 August 1968	1
24 August 1968	22	Hollies' Greatest ‡	The Hollies	1	12 October 1968	7
21 September 1968	19	Live at the Talk of the Town ‡	The Seekers	2	5 October 1968	7
2 November 1968	12	The Good, the Bad and the Ugly: Original Motion Picture Soundtrack ‡	Ennio Morricone	2	30 November 1968	1
23 November 1968	11	The Graduate	Simon & Garfunkel and Dave Grusin	3	1 February 1969	1
23 November 1968	4	Feliciano!	José Feliciano	6	1 February 1969	1
23 November 1968	46	The Best of The Seekers	The Seekers	1	25 January 1969	6
7 December 1968	14	The Beatles ‡	The Beatles	1	7 December 1968	8
7 December 1968	2	The Best of the Beach Boys Vol. 3	The Beach Boys	8	25 January 1969	1
14 December 1968	3	I Pretend ‡	Des O'Connor	8	14 December 1968	2
14 December 1968	4	Val ‡	Val Doonican	6	21 December 1968	3
21 December 1968	8	Beggars Banquet ‡	The Rolling Stones	3	28 December 1968	4
28 December 1968	4	Help Yourself	Tom Jones	4	11 January 1969	1
Albums in 1969
11 January 1969	1	Frank Sinatra's Greatest Hits	Frank Sinatra	8	11 January 1969	1
25 January 1969	1	The Best of Nat King Cole	Nat King Cole	5	25 January 1969	1
25 January 1969	3	British Motown Chartbusters Volume 2	Various artists	8	1 February 1969	1
8 February 1969	7	Yellow Submarine	The Beatles and George Martin	3	8 February 1969	1
8 February 1969	11	Diana Ross & the Supremes Join The Temptations	Diana Ross & the Supremes and The Temptations	1	15 February 1969	4
8 February 1969	14	Hair (Original London Cast Recording)	Original London Cast of Hair	3	26 April 1969	1
15 February 1969	1	Fresh Cream ^{[A]}	Cream	7	15 February 1969	1
15 February 1969	1	O.K. Ken?	Chicken Shack	9	15 February 1969	1
15 February 1969	27	Oliver!: Original Soundtrack	Various artists	4	13 September 1969	1
22 February 1969	4	Stonedhenge	Ten Years After	6	22 February 1969	3
22 February 1969	1	Disraeli Gears ^{[B]}	Cream	7	22 February 1969	1
22 February 1969	1	The Best of Dean Martin	Dean Martin	9	22 February 1969	1
1 March 1969	5	Postcard	Mary Hopkin	3	1 March 1969	2
1 March 1969	5	Engelbert	Engelbert Humperdinck	3	15 March 1969	2
15 March 1969	13	Goodbye	Cream	1	15 March 1969	4
22 March 1969	1	Family Entertainment	Family	6	22 March 1969	1
22 March 1969	1	Peter Sarstedt	Peter Sarstedt	8	22 March 1969	1
22 March 1969	1	Chitty Chitty Bang Bang: Original Soundtrack	Various artists	10	22 March 1969	1
29 March 1969	5	20/20	The Beach Boys	3	5 April 1969	1
5 April 1969	2	The Beat of the Brass	Herb Alpert & the Tijuana Brass	4	12 April 1969	1
5 April 1969	3	Scott 3	Scott Walker	3	12 April 1969	1
5 April 1969	1	Odessa	Bee Gees	10	5 April 1969	1
12 April 1969	5	Led Zeppelin	Led Zeppelin	6	10 May 1969	1
19 April 1969	3	Gentle on My Mind	Dean Martin	7	26 April 1969	1
26 April 1969	1	Hits of Gold	The Mamas & the Papas	9	26 April 1969	1
3 May 1969	6	Songs from a Room	Leonard Cohen	2	3 May 1969	2
3 May 1969	11	On the Threshold of a Dream	The Moody Blues	1	10 May 1969	2
3 May 1969	6	Elvis (NBC TV Special)	Elvis Presley	2	17 May 1969	1
17 May 1969	16	Nashville Skyline	Bob Dylan	1	24 May 1969	4
24 May 1969	3	Hollies Sing Dylan	The Hollies	3	31 May 1969	1
7 June 1969	4	Tommy	The Who	2	7 June 1969	1
14 June 1969	9	My Way	Frank Sinatra	2	14 June 1969	3
14 June 1969	17	The World of Val Doonican	Val Doonican	2	13 September 1969	1
14 June 1969	9	The World of Mantovani	Mantovani	6	6 September 1969	1
14 June 1969	2	The World of Charlie Kunz	Charlie Kunz	9	14 June 1969	2
14 June 1969	5	The World of The Bachelors	The Bachelors	8	19 July 1969	1
21 June 1969	16	His Orchestra, His Chorus, His Singers, His Sound	Ray Conniff	1	21 June 1969	3
28 June 1969	9	This is Tom Jones	Tom Jones	2	5 July 1969	1
28 June 1969	2	More	Pink Floyd	9	28 June 1969	2
5 July 1969	10	Elvis Sings Flaming Star	Elvis Presley	2	19 July 1969	3
5 July 1969	13	According to My Heart	Jim Reeves	1	12 July 1969	4
12 July 1969	1	Scott: Scott Walker Sings Songs from his T.V. Series	Scott Walker	7	12 July 1969	1
19 July 1969	2	The Best of Cliff	Cliff Richard	5	19 July 1969	1
19 July 1969	4	The Best of Glenn Miller	Glenn Miller	5	2 August 1969	1
2 August 1969	4	2001: A Space Odyssey: Original Soundtrack	Various artists	3	9 August 1969	1
9 August 1969	8	Stand Up	Jethro Tull	1	9 August 1969	5
9 August 1969	3	Cymanfa Ganu 1969	The Massed Choirs of South Wales	5	23 August 1969	1
16 August 1969	1	Ahead Rings Out	Blodwyn Pig	9	16 August 1969	1
23 August 1969	5	From Elvis in Memphis	Elvis Presley	1	30 August 1969	1
6 September 1969	26	At San Quentin	Johnny Cash	2	27 September 1969	2
13 September 1969	2	The World of Hits Vol. 2	Various artists	7	27 September 1969	1
13 September 1969	2	Nice	The Nice	3	20 September 1969	1
20 September 1969	5	Blind Faith	Blind Faith	1	20 September 1969	2
20 September 1969	1	The Best of Gene Pitney	Gene Pitney	8	20 September 1969	1
27 September 1969	13	Through the Past, Darkly (Big Hits Vol. 2)	The Rolling Stones	2	11 October 1969	2
4 October 1969	31	Abbey Road	The Beatles	1	4 October 1969	17
4 October 1969	1	The World of Mantovani Vol. 2	Mantovani	4	4 October 1969	1
11 October 1969	2	Songs for a Tailor	Jack Bruce	6	25 October 1969	1
11 October 1969	4	Ssssh	Ten Years After	4	18 October 1969	1
18 October 1969	5	Then Play On	Fleetwood Mac	6	18 October 1969	1
25 October 1969	30	Motown Chartbusters Volume 3 ♦	Various artists	1	14 February 1970	1
1 November 1969	5	In the Court of the Crimson King	King Crimson	5	1 November 1969	2
8 November 1969	54	Led Zeppelin II ♦	Led Zeppelin	1	7 February 1970	1
8 November 1969	5	Best of Bee Gees	Bee Gees	7	8 November 1969	3
8 November 1969	5	Best of Cream	Cream	6	22 November 1969	2
15 November 1969	2	Ummagumma	Pink Floyd	5	15 November 1969	1
22 November 1969	17	Tom Jones Live in Las Vegas ♦	Tom Jones	2	10 January 1970	1
6 December 1969	8	To Our Children's Children's Children	The Moody Blues	2	13 December 1969	1
13 December 1969	7	Engelbert Humperdinck	Engelbert Humperdinck	5	13 December 1969	1
20 December 1969	9	Let It Bleed	The Rolling Stones	1	20 December 1969	1

== Notes ==
- ^{a} Fresh Cream originally charted at number 39 upon its release in 1966 and entered the top 10 in 1967, peaking at number 6. It re-entered the top 10 at number 7 on 15 February 1969 (week ending) for one week.
- ^{b} Disraeli Gears originally peaked at number 5 upon its release in 1967. It re-entered the top 10 at number 7 on 22 February 1969 (week ending).

== See also ==
- 1969 in British music
- List of number-one albums from the 1960s (UK)
