= List of UK top-ten albums in 1967 =

List of top-ten UK albums in 1967

The UK Albums Chart is one of many music charts compiled by the Official Charts Company that calculates the best-selling albums of the week in the United Kingdom. Before 2004, the chart was only based on the sales of physical albums. This list shows albums that peaked in the Top 10 of the UK Albums Chart during 1967, as well as albums which peaked in 1966 and 1968 but were in the top 10 in 1968. The entry date is when the album appeared in the top ten for the first time (week ending, as published by the Official Charts Company, which is six days after the chart is announced).

The first new number-one album of the year was by The Monkees by The Monkees. Overall, four different albums peaked at number one in 1967, with The Monkees (2) having the most albums hit that position.

== Top-ten albums ==
Key

Symbol	Meaning
‡	Album peaked in 1965 or 1966 but still in chart in 1967.
♦	Album released in 1967 but peaked in 1968.
Entered	The date that the album first appeared in the chart.
Peak	Highest position that the album reached in the UK Albums Chart.

Entered (week ending)	Weeks in top 10	Single	Artist	Peak	Peak reached (week ending)	Weeks at peak
Albums in 1965
17 April 1965	233	The Sound of Music: Original Soundtrack ‡	Various artists	1	5 June 1965	70
Albums in 1966
19 February 1966	41	Going Places ‡	Herb Alpert & the Tijuana Brass	4	22 October 1966	2
16 July 1966	26	Pet Sounds ‡	The Beach Boys	2	23 July 1966	3
5 November 1966	10	Golden Hits ‡	Dusty Springfield	2	12 November 1966	1
12 November 1966	13	Distant Drums ‡	Jim Reeves	2	19 November 1966	1
12 November 1966	55	Best of the Beach Boys ‡	The Beach Boys	2	26 November 1966	10
19 November 1966	10	Big Hits (High Tide and Green Grass) ‡	The Rolling Stones	4	3 December 1966	2
3 December 1966	23	Come the Day ‡	The Seekers	3	24 December 1966	7
10 December 1966	9	Gentle Shades of Val Doonican ‡	Val Doonican	5	17 December 1966	2
Albums in 1967
7 January 1967	2	A Collection of Beatles Oldies	The Beatles	7	7 January 1967	1
7 January 1967	6	A Quick One	The Who	4	21 January 1967	1
14 January 1967	5	Finders Keepers	Cliff Richard and The Shadows	6	28 January 1967	1
14 January 1967	12	Hand Clappin, Foot Stompin, Funky-Butt ... Live!	Geno Washington & the Ram Jam Band	5	25 February 1967	1
21 January 1967	5	Fresh Cream	Cream	6	11 February 1967	1
28 January 1967	26	The Monkees	The Monkees	1	4 February 1967	7
4 February 1967	12	Between the Buttons	The Rolling Stones	3	11 February 1967	5
11 February 1967	6	Greatest Hits	Bob Dylan	6	18 March 1967	1
25 February 1967	6	S.R.O.	Herb Alpert & the Tijuana Brass	5	11 March 1967	1
25 February 1967	12	Four Tops Live!	Four Tops	4	8 April 1967	1
25 February 1967	1	Mantovani's Golden Hits	Mantovani	10	25 February 1967	1
11 March 1967	2	Trogglodynamite	The Troggs	10	11 March 1967	2
25 March 1967	1	A Hard Road	John Mayall's Bluesbreakers	10	25 March 1967	1
8 April 1967	3	Trini Lopez in London	Trini Lopez	6	8 April 1967	1
8 April 1967	6	Images	The Walker Brothers	6	22 April 1967	3
15 April 1967	19	More of the Monkees	The Monkees	1	13 May 1967	2
22 April 1967	11	Green, Green Grass of Home	Tom Jones	3	13 May 1967	4
22 April 1967	20	Fiddler on the Roof (Original London Cast Recording)	Original London Cast of Fiddler on the Roof	4	29 July 1967	2
6 May 1967	4	Matthew and Son	Cat Stevens	7	13 May 1967	2
13 May 1967	3	Seacombe's Personal Choice	Harry Seacombe	6	13 May 1967	1
13 May 1967	6	This is James Last	James Last	6	20 May 1967	1
27 May 1967	10	A Drop of the Hard Stuff	The Dubliners	5	3 June 1967	4
3 June 1967	19	Are You Experienced	The Jimi Hendrix Experience	2	10 June 1967	1
3 June 1967	43	Sgt. Pepper's Lonely Heart's Club Band	The Beatles	1	10 June 1967	27
10 June 1967	14	Release Me	Engelbert Humperdinck	6	30 September 1967	2
8 July 1967	14	Doctor Zhivago: The Original Soundtrack Album	Maurice Jarre	3	14 October 1967	2
8 July 1967	1	Hit the Road Stax!	Various artists	10	8 July 1967	1
15 July 1967	13	Headquarters	The Monkees	2	15 July 1967	6
15 July 1967	24	Live at The Talk of the Town ♦	Tom Jones	6	16 November 1968	1
22 July 1967	9	The Mamas & The Papas Deliver	The Mamas and the Papas	4	19 August 1967	1
29 July 1967	1	Buddy Holly's Greatest Hits	Buddy Holly	10	29 July 1967	1
19 August 1967	4	Jigsaw	The Shadows	8	19 August 1967	3
2 September 1967	7	The Piper at the Gates of Dawn	Pink Floyd	6	23 September 1967	1
23 September 1967	8	Scott	Scott Walker	3	30 September 1967	2
30 September 1967	4	The Walker Brothers' Story	The Walker Brothers	9	7 October 1967	1
7 October 1967	2	Crusade	John Mayall's Bluesbreakers	8	7 October 1967	1
14 October 1967	1	Hipsters, Flipsters, Finger-Poppin' Daddies	Geno Washington & the Ram Jam Band	8	14 October 1967	1
21 October 1967	9	Universal Soldier	Donovan	5	11 November 1967	1
21 October 1967	1	Raymond Lefèvre	Raymond Lefèvre & His Orchestra	10	11 November 1967	1
28 October 1967	15	Break-Through: An Introduction To Studio Two Stereo	Various artists	2	2 December 1967	1
28 October 1967	10	Best of the Beach Boys Vol. 2	The Beach Boys	3	4 November 1967	2
28 October 1967	23	British Motown Chartbusters	Various artists	2	9 December 1967	1
11 November 1967	1	More of the Hard Stuff	The Dubliners	8	11 November 1967	1
18 November 1967	1	Thoroughly Modern Millie: The Original Soundtrack Album	Various artists	9	18 November 1967	1
25 November 1967	7	Disraeli Gears	Cream	5	9 December 1967	2
25 November 1967	1	Bee Gees' 1st	Bee Gees	8	25 November 1967	1
25 November 1967	4	Smiley Smile	The Beach Boys	9	2 December 1967	2
2 December 1967	10	The Last Waltz	Engelbert Humperdinck	3	16 December 1967	1
2 December 1967	1	Unequalled Equals	The Equals	10	2 December 1967	1
9 December 1967	1	Sunny Afternoon	The Kinks	9	9 December 1967	1
16 December 1967	13	Val Doonican Rocks, But Gently ♦	Val Doonican	1	6 January 1968	3
23 December 1967	5	Axis: Bold as Love ♦	The Jimi Hendrix Experience	5	13 January 1968	1
23 December 1967	12	Reach Out ♦	Four Tops	4	27 January 1968	1
30 December 1967	5	Their Satanic Majesties Request ♦	The Rolling Stones	3	13 January 1968	1

== See also ==
- 1967 in British music
- List of number-one albums from the 1960s (UK)
