= List of UK top-ten albums in 1966 =

The UK Albums Chart is one of many music charts compiled by the Official Charts Company that calculates the best-selling albums of the week in the United Kingdom. Before 2004, the chart was only based on the sales of physical albums. This list shows albums that peaked in the Top 10 of the UK Albums Chart during 1966, as well as albums which peaked in 1965 but were in the top 10 in 1966. The entry date is when the album appeared in the top ten for the first time (week ending, as published by the Official Charts Company, which is six days after the chart is announced).

The first new number-one album of the year was by Aftermath by The Rolling Stones. Overall, two different albums peaked at number one in 1966, with two unique artists hitting that position.

== Top-ten albums ==
Key

Symbol	Meaning
‡	Album peaked in 1965 but still in chart in 1966.
Entered	The date that the album first appeared in the chart.
Peak	Highest position that the album reached in the UK Albums Chart.

Entered (week ending)	Weeks in top 10	Single	Artist	Peak	Peak reached (week ending)	Weeks at peak
Albums in 1965
6 February 1965	16	The Best of Jim Reeves ‡	Jim Reeves	3	20 February 1965	4
17 April 1965	233	The Sound of Music: Original Soundtrack ‡	Various artists	1	5 June 1965	70
17 April 1965	55	Mary Poppins: Original Soundtrack ‡	Various artists	2	4 December 1965	2
10 July 1965	8	A World of Our Own ‡	The Seekers	5	31 July 1965	2
7 August 1965	24	Almost There ‡	Andy Williams	4	18 September 1965	4
14 August 1965	30	Help! ‡	The Beatles	1	14 August 1965	9
2 October 1965	16	Out of Our Heads ‡	The Rolling Stones	2	13 November 1965	1
16 October 1965	12	Highway 61 Revisited ‡	Bob Dylan	4	27 November 1965	2
30 October 1965	8	Ev'rything's Coming Up Dusty ‡	Dusty Springfield	6	27 November 1965	1
4 December 1965	7	Farewell, Angelina ‡	Joan Baez	5	11 December 1965	4
18 December 1965	30	Rubber Soul ‡	The Beatles	1	25 December 1965	8
25 December 1965	2	Magic of the Minstrels ‡	The George Mitchell Minstrels	9	25 December 1965	2
Albums in 1966
8 January 1966	5	My Generation	The Who	5	8 January 1966	1
8 January 1966	3	Tears of Happiness	Ken Dodd	6	8 January 1966	3
22 January 1966	24	Take It Easy with the Walker Brothers	The Walker Brothers	3	26 March 1966	5
22 January 1966	1	The Kink Kontroversy	The Kinks	9	22 January 1966	1
22 January 1966	5	Their First LP	The Spencer Davis Group	6	29 January 1966	1
29 January 1966	13	The Second Album	The Spencer Davis Group	3	26 February 1966	1
29 January 1966	6	A Man and His Music	Frank Sinatra	9	29 January 1966	1
29 January 1966	11	My Name Is Barbra, Two...	Barbra Streisand	6	29 January 1966	1
19 February 1966	41	Going Places	Herb Alpert & the Tijuana Brass	4	22 October 1966	2
26 February 1966	9	Beach Boys' Party!	The Beach Boys	3	5 March 1966	1
26 February 1966	10	Otis Blue/Otis Redding Sings Soul	Otis Redding	6	2 April 1966	1
5 March 1966	1	A String of Tony's Hits	Tony Bennett	9	5 March 1966	1
12 March 1966	10	Bye Bye Blues	Bert Kaempfert & His Orchestra	4	2 April 1966	2
23 April 1966	18	Aftermath	The Rolling Stones	1	30 April 1966	8
30 April 1966	7	Mantovani Magic	Mantovani	3	14 May 1966	1
30 April 1966	10	The Most of the Animals	The Animals	4	14 May 1966	1
7 May 1966	5	The Beach Boys Today!	The Beach Boys	6	14 May 1966	1
21 May 1966	11	Cilla Sings a Rainbow	Cilla Black	4	4 June 1966	2
21 May 1966	2	Daydream	The Lovin' Spoonful	8	28 May 1966	1
21 May 1966	12	Small Faces	Small Faces	3	11 June 1966	5
28 May 1966	1	Kinda Latin	Cliff Richard	9	28 May 1966	1
4 June 1966	8	Shadow Music	The Shadows	5	25 June 1966	1
4 June 1966	8	Animalisms	The Animals	4	25 June 1966	4
4 June 1966	10	Sweet Things	Georgie Fame and the Blue Flames	6	9 July 1966	1
9 July 1966	11	If You Can Believe Your Eyes and Ears	The Mamas & the Papas	3	16 July 1966	1
16 July 1966	26	Pet Sounds	The Beach Boys	2	23 July 1966	3
16 July 1966	8	Strangers in the Night	Frank Sinatra	4	23 July 1966	2
23 July 1966	10	Summer Days (And Summer Nights!!)	The Beach Boys	4	30 July 1966	4
13 August 1966	21	Revolver	The Beatles	1	13 August 1966	7
13 August 1966	6	Paradise, Hawaiian Style	Elvis Presley	5	20 August 1966	3
13 August 1966	6	From Nowhere	The Troggs	6	20 August 1966	1
27 August 1966	8	Blonde on Blonde	Bob Dylan	3	3 September 1966	1
10 September 1966	11	Portrait	The Walker Brothers	3	24 September 1966	4
10 September 1966	7	Blues Breakers with Eric Clapton	John Mayall's Bluesbreakers with Eric Clapton	6	24 September 1966	2
24 September 1966	8	Autumn '66	The Spencer Davis Group	4	15 October 1966	1
1 October 1966	5	Stars Charity Fantasia	Various artists	6	8 October 1966	1
1 October 1966	9	Well Respected Kinks	The Kinks	5	29 October 1966	1
15 October 1966	4	Sinatra at the Sands	Frank Sinatra	7	29 October 1966	1
5 November 1966	10	Golden Hits	Dusty Springfield	2	12 November 1966	1
5 November 1966	1	Sound Venture	Georgie Fame and the Harry South Big Band	9	12 November 1966	1
12 November 1966	13	Distant Drums	Jim Reeves	2	19 November 1966	1
12 November 1966	55	Best of the Beach Boys	The Beach Boys	2	26 November 1966	10
19 November 1966	10	Big Hits (High Tide and Green Grass)	The Rolling Stones	4	3 December 1966	2
3 December 1966	23	Come the Day	The Seekers	3	24 December 1966	7
10 December 1966	9	Gentle Shades of Val Doonican	Val Doonican	5	17 December 1966	2
17 December 1966	1	On Top	Four Tops	9	17 December 1966	1

== See also ==
- 1966 in British music
- List of number-one albums from the 1960s (UK)
