= List of UK top-ten albums in 1965 =

The UK Albums Chart is one of many music charts compiled by the Official Charts Company that calculates the best-selling albums of the week in the United Kingdom. Before 2004, the chart was only based on the sales of physical albums. This list shows albums that peaked in the Top 10 of the UK Albums Chart during 1965, as well as albums which peaked in 1964 but were in the top 10 in 1965. The entry date is when the album appeared in the top ten for the first time (week ending, as published by the Official Charts Company, which is six days after the chart is announced).

The first new number-one album of the year was by The Rolling Stones No. 2 by The Rolling Stones. Overall, six different albums peaked at number one in 1965, with The Beatles (2) having the most albums hit that position.

== Top-ten albums ==
Key

Symbol	Meaning
‡	Album peaked in 1962 or 1964 but still in chart in 1965.
Entered	The date that the album first appeared in the chart.
Peak	Highest position that the album reached in the UK Albums Chart.

Entered (week ending)	Weeks in top 10	Single	Artist	Peak	Peak reached (week ending)	Weeks at peak
Albums in 1962
24 March 1962	153	West Side Story: Original Soundtrack ‡	Various artists	1	23 June 1962	13
Albums in 1964
25 April 1964	42	The Rolling Stones ‡	The Rolling Stones	1	2 May 1964	12
4 July 1964	40	The Bachelors and 16 Great Songs ‡	The Bachelors	2	26 December 1964	4
18 July 1964	32	A Hard Day's Night ‡	The Beatles	1	25 July 1964	21
17 October 1964	22	Kinks ‡	The Kinks	3	5 December 1964	2
21 November 1964	13	The Animals ‡	The Animals	6	5 December 1964	2
5 December 1964	5	Twelve Songs of Christmas ‡	Jim Reeves	4	26 December 1964	2
12 December 1964	37	Beatles for Sale ‡	The Beatles	1	19 December 1964	11
12 December 1964	10	Oh, Pretty Woman	Roy Orbison	5	9 January 1965	1
19 December 1964	20	The Lucky 13 Shades of Val Doonican	Val Doonican	2	23 January 1965	1
Albums in 1965
23 January 1965	24	The Rolling Stones No. 2	The Rolling Stones	1	6 February 1965	10
6 February 1965	16	The Best of Jim Reeves	Jim Reeves	3	20 February 1965	4
20 February 1965	6	Cilla	Cilla Black	5	6 March 1965	2
20 February 1965	6	The Voice of Winston Churchill	Sir Winston Churchill	6	27 February 1965	1
6 March 1965	8	Sandie	Sandie Shaw	3	27 March 1965	1
20 March 1965	9	Kinda Kinks	The Kinks	3	20 March 1965	2
20 March 1965	22	The Freewheelin' Bob Dylan	Bob Dylan	1	17 April 1965	2
3 April 1965	5	The Pretty Things	The Pretty Things	6	17 April 1965	1
10 April 1965	1	Sounds Like Searchers	The Searchers	8	1 May 1965	1
10 April 1965	9	The Times They Are a-Changin'	Bob Dylan	4	1 May 1965	2
17 April 1965	233	The Sound of Music: Original Soundtrack	Various artists	1	5 June 1965	70
17 April 1965	55	Mary Poppins: Original Cast Soundtrack	Various artists	2	4 December 1965	2
1 May 1965	8	Girl Happy	Elvis Presley	7	1 May 1965	3
1 May 1965	1	Another Side of Bob Dylan	Bob Dylan	8	1 May 1965	1
1 May 1965	1	Cliff Richard	Cliff Richard	9	1 May 1965	1
1 May 1965	7	My Fair Lady: Original Soundtrack Recording	Various artists	9	1 May 1965	3
22 May 1965	14	Animal Tracks	The Animals	6	29 May 1965	2
22 May 1965	23	Bringing It All Back Home	Bob Dylan	1	29 May 1965	1
5 June 1965	9	Hit Maker!: Burt Bacharach plays the Burt Bacharach Hits	Burt Bacharach	3	12 June 1965	1
12 June 1965	9	What's Bin Did and What's Bin Hid	Donovan	3	10 July 1965	1
3 July 1965	1	Joan Baez	Joan Baez	9	3 July 1965	1
10 July 1965	15	Joan Baez/5	Joan Baez	3	17 July 1965	5
10 July 1965	8	A World of Our Own	The Seekers	5	31 July 1965	2
24 July 1965	11	The Sound of The Shadows	The Shadows	4	28 August 1965	1
31 July 1965	4	Joan Baez in Concert, Part 2	Joan Baez	8	7 August 1965	3
7 August 1965	24	Almost There	Andy Williams	4	18 September 1965	4
14 August 1965	30	Help!	The Beatles	1	14 August 1965	9
21 August 1965	3	Catch Us If You Can	The Dave Clark Five	8	21 August 1965	2
11 September 1965	5	Mr. Tambourine Man	The Byrds	7	18 September 1965	2
2 October 1965	16	Out of Our Heads	The Rolling Stones	2	13 November 1965	1
9 October 1965	8	Hollies	The Hollies	8	23 October 1965	1
9 October 1965	1	There Is Only One Roy Orbison	Roy Orbison	10	9 October 1965	1
16 October 1965	12	Highway 61 Revisited	Bob Dylan	4	27 November 1965	2
16 October 1965	3	All I Really Want to Do	Cher	7	23 October 1965	1
23 October 1965	6	Look at Us	Sonny & Cher	7	30 October 1965	1
30 October 1965	7	Mann Made	Manfred Mann	7	13 November 1965	4
30 October 1965	8	Ev'rything's Coming Up Dusty	Dusty Springfield	6	27 November 1965	1
4 December 1965	7	Farewell, Angelina	Joan Baez	5	11 December 1965	4
4 December 1965	3	Elvis for Everyone!	Elvis Presley	8	11 December 1965	1
18 December 1965	31	Rubber Soul	The Beatles	1	25 December 1965	8
25 December 1965	2	Magic of the Minstrels	The George Mitchell Minstrels	9	25 December 1965	2

== See also ==
- 1965 in British music
- List of number-one albums from the 1960s (UK)
