= List of UK top-ten albums in 1968 =

The UK Albums Chart is one of many music charts compiled by the Official Charts Company that calculates the best-selling albums of the week in the United Kingdom. Before 2004, the chart was only based on the sales of physical albums. This list shows albums that peaked in the Top 10 of the UK Albums Chart during 1968, as well as albums which peaked in 1967 and 1969 but were in the top 10 in 1968. The entry date is when the album appeared in the top ten for the first time (week ending, as published by the Official Charts Company, which is six days after the chart is announced).

The first new number-one album of the year was by Val Doonican Rocks, But Gently by Val Doonican. Overall, twelve different albums peaked at number one in 1968, with twelve unique artists hitting that position.

== Top-ten albums ==
Key

Symbol	Meaning
‡	Album peaked in 1965, 1966 or 1967 but still in chart in 1968.
♦	Album released in 1968 but peaked in 1969.
Entered	The date that the album first appeared in the chart.
Peak	Highest position that the album reached in the UK Albums Chart.

Entered (week ending)	Weeks in top 10	Single	Artist	Peak	Peak reached (week ending)	Weeks at peak
Albums in 1965
17 April 1965	233	The Sound of Music: Original Soundtrack ‡	Various artists	1	5 June 1965	70
Albums in 1966
12 November 1966	55	Best of the Beach Boys ‡	The Beach Boys	2	26 November 1966	10
Albums in 1967
3 June 1967	43	Sgt. Pepper's Lonely Heart's Club Band ‡	The Beatles	1	10 June 1967	27
15 July 1967	24	Live at The Talk of the Town	Tom Jones	6	16 November 1968	1
28 October 1967	15	Break-Through: An Introduction To Studio Two Stereo ‡	Various artists	2	2 December 1967	1
28 October 1967	10	Best of the Beach Boys Vol. 2 ‡	The Beach Boys	3	4 November 1967	2
28 October 1967	23	British Motown Chartbusters ‡	Various artists	2	9 December 1967	1
25 November 1967	7	Disraeli Gears ‡	Cream	5	9 December 1967	2
2 December 1967	10	The Last Waltz ‡	Engelbert Humperdinck	3	16 December 1967	1
16 December 1967	13	Val Doonican Rocks, But Gently	Val Doonican	1	6 January 1968	3
23 December 1967	5	Axis: Bold as Love	The Jimi Hendrix Experience	5	13 January 1968	1
23 December 1967	12	Reach Out	Four Tops	4	27 January 1968	1
30 December 1967	5	Their Satanic Majesties Request	The Rolling Stones	3	13 January 1968	1
Albums in 1968
13 January 1968	14	13 Smash Hits	Tom Jones	5	10 February 1968	1
20 January 1968	8	Pisces, Aquarius, Capricorn & Jones Ltd.	The Monkees	5	17 February 1968	2
3 February 1968	18	The Four Tops Greatest Hits	Four Tops	1	10 February 1968	1
3 February 1968	24	The Supremes: Greatest Hits	The Supremes	1	17 February 1968	3
9 March 1968	21	John Wesley Harding	Bob Dylan	1	9 March 1968	13
9 March 1968	4	Otis Blue/Otis Redding Sings Soul ^{[A]}	Otis Redding	7	23 March 1968	1
16 March 1968	16	The History of Otis Redding	Otis Redding	2	6 April 1968	5
23 March 1968	17	Fleetwood Mac	Fleetwood Mac	4	25 May 1968	2
23 March 1968	5	Wild Honey	The Beach Boys	7	6 April 1968	1
30 March 1968	5	2 In 3	Esther & Abi Ofarim	6	13 April 1968	1
13 April 1968	6	Live at London's Talk of the Town	Diana Ross & the Supremes	6	11 May 1968	1
20 April 1968	10	The Hangman's Beautiful Daughter	The Incredible String Band	5	27 April 1968	2
4 May 1968	12	Scott 2	Scott Walker	1	18 May 1968	1
11 May 1968	1	Sher-oo!	Cilla Black	7	11 May 1968	1
18 May 1968	10	Smash Hits	The Jimi Hendrix Experience	4	8 June 1968	1
25 May 1968	18	The Jungle Book: Original Soundtrack	Various artists	5	29 June 1968	1
1 June 1968	9	Love, Andy	Andy Williams	1	15 June 1968	1
22 June 1968	7	The Dock of the Bay	Otis Redding	1	22 June 1968	1
22 June 1968	9	Ogdens' Nut Gone Flake	Small Faces	1	29 June 1968	6
22 June 1968	1	Buddy Holly's Greatest Hits ^{[B]}	Buddy Holly	9	22 June 1968	1
29 June 1968	3	Dionne Warwick in Valley of the Dolls	Dionne Warwick	10	29 June 1968	3
27 July 1968	8	The Crazy World of Arthur Brown	The Crazy World of Arthur Brown	2	27 July 1968	2
27 July 1968	7	Bare Wires	John Mayall's Bluesbreakers	3	27 July 1968	1
27 July 1968	2	Honey	Andy Williams	4	27 July 1968	1
3 August 1968	16	Delilah	Tom Jones	1	10 August 1968	2
10 August 1968	21	Bookends	Simon & Garfunkel	1	17 August 1968	7
10 August 1968	16	A Man Without Love	Engelbert Humperdinck	3	31 August 1968	1
17 August 1968	8	In Search of the Lost Chord	The Moody Blues	5	14 September 1968	1
17 August 1968	1	A Saucerful of Secrets	Pink Floyd	9	17 August 1968	1
17 August 1968	6	Boogie with Canned Heat	Canned Heat	5	5 October 1968	1
24 August 1968	22	Hollies' Greatest	The Hollies	1	12 October 1968	7
24 August 1968	2	Wheels of Fire (Single LP Version)	Cream	7	24 August 1968	1
24 August 1968	9	Wheels of Fire (Double LP Version)	Cream	3	14 September 1968	1
21 September 1968	19	Live at the Talk of the Town	The Seekers	2	5 October 1968	7
5 October 1968	3	Aretha Now	Aretha Franklin	6	5 October 1968	2
12 October 1968	1	Mr. Wonderful	Fleetwood Mac	10	12 October 1968	1
19 October 1968	6	Idea	Bee Gees	4	2 November 1968	1
19 October 1968	3	At Folsom Prison	Johnny Cash	7	19 October 1968	1
2 November 1968	12	The Good, the Bad and the Ugly: Original Motion Picture Soundtrack	Ennio Morricone	2	30 November 1968	1
2 November 1968	1	Traffic	Traffic	9	2 November 1968	1
16 November 1968	2	This Was	Jethro Tull	10	16 November 1968	2
23 November 1968	11	The Graduate ♦	Simon & Garfunkel and Dave Grusin	3	1 February 1969	1
23 November 1968	4	Feliciano! ♦	José Feliciano	6	1 February 1969	1
23 November 1968	46	The Best of The Seekers ♦	The Seekers	1	25 January 1969	6
23 November 1968	4	Electric Ladyland	The Jimi Hendrix Experience	6	7 December 1968	1
7 December 1968	14	The Beatles	The Beatles	1	7 December 1968	8
7 December 1968	2	The Best of the Beach Boys Vol. 3 ♦	The Beach Boys	8	25 January 1969	1
14 December 1968	3	I Pretend	Des O'Connor	8	14 December 1968	2
14 December 1968	4	Val	Val Doonican	6	21 December 1968	3
21 December 1968	8	Beggars Banquet	The Rolling Stones	3	28 December 1968	4
28 December 1968	4	Help Yourself ♦	Tom Jones	4	11 January 1969	1

== Notes ==
- ^{a} Otis Blue/Otis Redding Sings Soul originally peaked at number 6 upon its release in 1966. It re-entered the top 10 at number 9 on 9 March 1968 (week ending) for three weeks. It re-entered the top 10 again at number 9 on 6 April 1968 (week ending) for one week.
- ^{b} Buddy Holly's Greatest Hits originally peaked at number 10 upon its release in 1967. It re-entered the top 10 at a brand new peak of number 9 on 9 March 1968 (week ending) for one week.

== See also ==
- 1968 in British music
- List of number-one albums from the 1960s (UK)
