= List of UK top-ten albums in 1960 =

The UK Albums Chart is one of many music charts compiled by the Official Charts Company that calculates the best-selling albums of the week in the United Kingdom. Before 2004, the chart was only based on the sales of physical albums. This list shows albums that peaked in the top 10 of the UK Albums Chart during 1960, as well as albums which peaked in 1959 or 1961 but were in the top 10 in 1960. The entry date is when the album appeared in the top 10 for the first time (week ending, as published by the Official Charts Company, which is six days after the chart is announced).

== Top-ten albums ==
Key

Symbol	Meaning
‡	Album peaked in 1958 or 1959 but still in chart in 1960.
♦	Album released in 1960 but peaked in 1961.
Entered	The date that the album first appeared in the chart.
Peak	Highest position that the song reached in the UK Albums Chart.

Entered (week ending)	Weeks in top 10	Single	Artist	Peak	Peak reached (week ending)	Weeks at peak
Albums in 1956
28 July 1956	112	Rodgers and Hammerstein's Oklahoma!: Original Soundtrack ‡	Various artists	1	29 September 1956	3
22 September 1956	153	The King and I: Original Soundtrack ‡ ^{[C]}^{[]}	Various artists	1	13 October 1956	48
Albums in 1958
3 May 1958	180	South Pacific: Original Soundtrack ‡ ^{[]}^{[]}	Various artists	1	8 November 1958	115
10 May 1958	122	My Fair Lady ‡ ^{[]}	Original Broadway Cast	1	10 May 1958	19
11 October 1958	40	Elvis' Golden Records ‡ ^{[]}	Elvis Presley	2	25 October 1958	1
22 November 1958	6	Pack Up Your Troubles ‡	Russ Conway	6	3 January 1959	1
6 December 1958	19	The Student Prince and The Great Caruso ‡	Mario Lanza	4	17 October 1959	1
Albums in 1959
31 January 1959	79	Gigi: Original Soundtrack ‡	Various artists	2	28 March 1959	32
14 February 1959	39	The Best of Sellers ‡	Peter Sellers	3	12 September 1959	3
21 February 1959	12	Continental Encores ‡	Mantovani	4	21 February 1959	6
18 April 1959	31	Cliff ‡	Cliff Richard and The Drifters	4	9 May 1959	2
2 May 1959	43	The Buddy Holly Story ‡	Buddy Holly and The Crickets	2	16 May 1959	1
16 May 1959	28	Come Dance with Me! ‡	Frank Sinatra	2	23 May 1959	2
8 August 1959	15	A Date with Elvis ‡	Elvis Presley	4	22 August 1959	1
19 September 1959	16	Family Favourites ‡	Russ Conway	3	3 October 1959	2
26 September 1959	4	Strictly for Grown Ups ‡	Paddy Roberts	8	26 September 1959	2
26 September 1959	3	Gypsy Camp Fires ‡	101 Strings	9	3 October 1959	2
14 November 1959	31	Cliff Sings ‡	Cliff Richard	2	14 November 1959	15
28 November 1959	7	The Goon Show	The Goons	8	12 December 1959	3
12 December 1959	22	Songs for Swingin' Sellers	Peter Sellers	3	16 January 1960	3
19 December 1959	7	Time to Celebrate	Russ Conway	3	2 January 1960	2
Albums in 1960
23 January 1960	11	The Five Pennies: Original Soundtrack	Various artists	2	27 February 1960	1
13 February 1960	1	Nina & Frederick	Nina & Frederick	9	13 February 1960	1
13 February 1960	1	Ride on a Rainbow	Johnny Mathis	10	13 February 1960	1
27 February 1960	7	The Explosive Freddy Cannon	Freddy Cannon	1	12 March 1960	1
12 March 1960	2	Songs for Swingin' Lovers	Frank Sinatra	8	12 March 1960	1
19 March 1960	12	The "Twangs" the "Thang"	Duane Eddy	2	26 March 1960	4
19 March 1960	2	7 Ages of Acker	Acker Bilk	6	26 March 1960	1
19 March 1960	6	This is Darin	Bobby Darin	4	26 March 1960	1
26 March 1960	1	At the Drop of a Hat: Original Cast Recording	Various artists	9	26 March 1960	1
2 April 1960	4	My Concerto for You	Russ Conway	5	2 April 1960	1
2 April 1960	4	Fings Ain't Wot They Used T'Be: Original Cast Recording	Various artists	5	30 April 1960	1
2 April 1960	22	Flower Drum Song	Original Broadway Cast	2	14 May 1960	1
9 April 1960	14	This is Hancock	Tony Hancock	2	30 April 1960	4
7 May 1960	3	I Remember Hank Williams	Jack Scott	7	4 June 1960	1
7 May 1960	19	Can-Can: Original Soundtrack	Various artists	2	11 June 1960	4
14 May 1960	3	Follow That Girl	Original London Cast	5	14 May 1960	1
21 May 1960	4	The Most Happy Fella	Original Broadway Cast	6	2 July 1960	1
4 June 1960	4	Latin ala Lee!	Peggy Lee	8	9 July 1960	2
11 June 1960	3	Come Back to Sorrento	Frank Sinatra	6	20 August 1960	1
11 June 1960	1	Flower Drum Song	Original London Cast	10	11 June 1960	1
18 June 1960	14	50,000,000 Elvis Fans Can't Be Wrong: Elvis' Gold Records, Volume 2	Elvis Presley	4	16 July 1960	2
25 June 1960	2	An Evening Wasted with Tom Lehrer	Tom Lehrer	7	9 July 1960	1
2 July 1960	17	It's Everly Brothers	The Everly Brothers	2	9 July 1960	2
23 July 1960	20	Elvis is Back	Elvis Presley	1	30 July 1960	1
30 July 1960	10	The Great Caruso	Mario Lanza	3	27 August 1960	1
27 August 1960	16	Down Drury Lane to Memory Lane	101 Strings	1	10 September 1960	5
3 September 1960	13	At The Oxford Union	Gerard Hoffnung	4	10 September 1960	4
10 September 1960	55	Oliver! ♦	Original London Cast	4	21 October 1961	1
1 October 1960	3	Eddie Cochran Memorial Album	Eddie Cochran	9	1 October 1960	2
15 October 1960	28	Me and My Shadows	Cliff Richard and The Shadows	2	29 October 1960	6
22 October 1960	5	The Fabulous Style of the Everly Brothers	The Everly Brothers	4	29 October 1960	1
22 October 1960	5	The Buddy Holly Story Volume 2	Buddy Holly	7	29 October 1960	2
29 October 1960	5	Swing Easy	Frank Sinatra	5	26 November 1960	1
5 November 1960	3	Join Bing and Sing Along	Bing Crosby	7	17 December 1960	1
19 November 1960	13	The Button-Down Mind of Bob Newhart	Bob Newhart	2	3 December 1960	2
26 November 1960	120	The Black and White Minstrel Show ♦	The George Mitchell Minstrels	1	29 July 1961	9
3 December 1960	25	The Ray Conniff Hi-Fi Companion	Ray Conniff, His Orchestra & Chorus	3	17 December 1960	2
3 December 1960	9	Peter and Sophia ♦	Peter Sellers & Sophia Loren	5	14 January 1961	2
10 December 1960	49	G.I. Blues ♦	Elvis Presley	1	14 January 1961	22
10 December 1960	5	Rhythms and Ballads of Broadway	Johnny Mathis	6	24 December 1960	1
17 December 1960	7	Party Time	Russ Conway	7	24 December 1960	3
31 December 1960	1	The Messiah	London Philharmonic Choir	10	31 December 1960	1

== See also ==
- 1960 in British music
- List of number-one albums from the 1960s (UK)
