= The Best of Ball, Barber & Bilk =

1952 compilation album

The Best of Ball, Barber & Bilk is a compilation album consisting of tracks by British trumpeter Kenny Ball, trombone player Chris Barber and clarinetist and band leader Acker Bilk. The album reached number 1 in the UK, spending two non-consecutive weeks at the top in 1962. The album contains 4 tracks by each artist. It was later issued on CD on the Hallmark label.

== Track listing ==
1. Acker Bilk & His Paramount Jazz Band - Jump In The Line
2. Acker Bilk & His Paramount Jazz Band - Higher Ground
3. Acker Bilk & His Paramount Jazz Band - Willie The Weeper
4. Acker Bilk & His Paramount Jazz Band - Gladiolus Rag
5. Kenny Ball & His Jazzmen - Teddy Bears' Picnic
6. Kenny Ball & His Jazzmen - Hawaiian War Chant
7. Kenny Ball & His Jazzmen - I Love You Samantha
8. Kenny Ball & His Jazzmen - Chimes Blues
9. Chris Barber & His Jazz Band - Majorca
10. Chris Barber & His Jazz Band - High Society
11. Chris Barber & His Jazz Band - Tuxedo Rag
12. Chris Barber & His Jazz Band - When The Saints Go Marching In

Preceded by West Side Story (soundtrack)	UK Albums Chart number-one album 22 September 1962 - 28 September 1962	Succeeded by West Side Story (soundtrack)
