= List of UK top-ten albums in 1961 =

The UK Albums Chart is one of many music charts compiled by the Official Charts Company that calculates the best-selling albums of the week in the United Kingdom. Before 2004, the chart was only based on the sales of physical albums. This list shows albums that peaked in the top 10 of the UK Albums Chart during 1961, as well as albums which peaked in 1960 or 1962 but were in the top 10 in 1960. The entry date is when the album appeared in the top 10 for the first time (week ending, as published by the Official Charts Company, which is six days after the chart is announced).

== Top-ten albums ==
Key

Symbol	Meaning
‡	Album peaked between 1958 and 1960 but still in chart in 1961.
♦	Album released in 1961 but peaked in 1962.
(#)	Year-end top-ten album position and rank
Entered	The date that the album first appeared in the chart.
Peak	Highest position that the album reached in the UK Albums Chart.

Entered (week ending)	Weeks in top 10	Single	Artist	Peak	Peak reached (week ending)	Weeks at peak
Albums in 1956
28 July 1956	112	Rodgers and Hammerstein's Oklahoma!: Original Soundtrack ‡	Various artists	1	29 September 1956	3
Albums in 1958
3 May 1958	276	South Pacific: Original Soundtrack ‡ ^{[B]}	Various artists	1	8 November 1958	115
Albums in 1959
2 May 1959	43	The Buddy Holly Story ‡ ^{[C]}	Buddy Holly and The Crickets	2	16 May 1959	1
Albums in 1960
10 September 1960	55	Oliver!	Original London Cast	4	21 October 1961	1
15 October 1960	28	Me and My Shadows ‡	Cliff Richard and The Shadows	2	29 October 1960	6
22 October 1960	5	The Fabulous Style of the Everly Brothers ‡	The Everly Brothers	4	29 October 1960	1
19 November 1960	13	The Button-Down Mind of Bob Newhart ‡	Bob Newhart	2	3 December 1960	2
26 November 1960	120	The Black and White Minstrel Show	The George Mitchell Minstrels	1	29 July 1961	9
3 December 1960	25	The Ray Conniff Hi-Fi Companion ‡	Ray Conniff, His Orchestra & Chorus	3	17 December 1960	2
3 December 1960	9	Peter and Sophia	Peter Sellers & Sophia Loren	5	14 January 1961	2
10 December 1960	49	G.I. Blues	Elvis Presley	1	14 January 1961	22
10 December 1960	5	Rhythms and Ballads of Broadway ‡	Johnny Mathis	6	24 December 1960	1
17 December 1960	7	Party Time ‡	Russ Conway	7	24 December 1960	3
Albums in 1961
7 January 1961	16	Adam	Adam Faith	5	28 January 1961	1
21 January 1961	22	Nice 'n' Easy	Frank Sinatra	4	11 February 1961	4
18 February 1961	1	Glenn Miller Plays Selections From The Glenn Miller Story	Glenn Miller	10	18 February 1961	1
25 February 1961	5	Song Without End: Original Soundtrack	Various Artists	8	8 April 1961	1
4 March 1961	12	A Date With the Everly Brothers	The Everly Brothers	3	1 April 1961	1
4 March 1961	1	Shirley	Shirley Bassey	9	4 March 1961	1
8 April 1961	1	Huckleberry Hound: Original Television Soundtrack	Various artists	10	8 April 1961	1
15 April 1961	6	$1,000,000.00 Worth of Twang	Duane Eddy	5	20 May 1961	1
22 April 1961	19	Listen to Cliff!	Cliff Richard	2	20 May 1961	1
6 May 1961	11	Seven Brides for Seven Brothers: Original Soundtrack	Various artists	6	6 May 1961	3
20 May 1961	16	His Hand in Mine	Elvis Presley	3	10 June 1961	1
3 June 1961	2	The Best of Barber and Bilk Volume 1	Chris Barber and Acker Bilk	4	1 July 1961	9
3 June 1961	7	The Music Man	Original London Cast	8	3 June 1961	3
1 July 1961	12	The Sound of Music	Original Broadway Cast	4	15 July 1961	2
8 July 1961	6	Tony	Anthony Newley	5	19 August 1961	1
19 August 1961	37	The Sound of Music	Original London Cast	3	21 October 1961	1
26 August 1961	7	When Your Lover Has Gone	Frank Sinatra	6	23 September 1961	1
9 September 1961	1	The Student Prince/The Vagabond King	John Hanson	9	9 September 1961	1
16 September 1961	51	The Shadows	The Shadows	1	23 September 1961	5
23 September 1961	2	Hell Bent for Leather	Frankie Laine	7	23 September 1961	1
30 September 1961	4	Halfway to Paradise	Billy Fury	5	21 October 1961	1
7 October 1961	2	Stop the World – I Want to Get Off	Original London Cast	8	7 October 1961	2
14 October 1961	2	Sinatra's Swingin' Session!!!	Frank Sinatra	6	21 October 1961	1
28 October 1961	24	Another Black and White Minstrel Show	The George Mitchell Minstrels	1	11 November 1961	8
28 October 1961	8	21 Today	Cliff Richard	1	4 November 1961	1
28 October 1961	7	That'll Be the Day	Buddy Holly	5	4 November 1961	1
4 November 1961	10	Something for Everybody	Elvis Presley	2	11 November 1961	2
4 November 1961	4	Sinatra Swings	Frank Sinatra	8	4 November 1961	3
2 December 1961	2	The Best of Barber and Bilk Volume 2 ♦	Chris Barber and Acker Bilk	8	6 January 1962	1
9 December 1961	1	Sinatra Plus	Frank Sinatra	7	9 December 1961	1
9 December 1961	47	Blue Hawaii ♦	Elvis Presley	1	6 January 1962	18
16 December 1961	26	The Roaring 20's: Songs from the TV Series	Dorothy Provine	3	30 December 1961	2
23 December 1961	30	The Young Ones ♦	Cliff Richard	1	13 January 1962	6
30 December 1961	1	Christmas Carols	Temple Church Choir	8	30 December 1961	1
30 December 1961	4	Ring-a-Ding-Ding! ♦	Frank Sinatra	8	13 January 1962	1

== See also ==
- 1961 in British music
- List of number-one albums from the 1960s (UK)
