= With These Hands (song) =

Single by Eddie Fisher
- B-side: "When I Was Young (Yes, Very Young)"
- Released: July 1953
- Genre: Traditional pop
- Length: 2:50
- Label: RCA Victor
- Songwriters: Benny Davis, Abner Silver

Eddie Fisher singles chronology
"I'm Walking Behind You" (1953)	"With These Hands" (1953)	"Many Times" (1953)

"With These Hands" is a song written by Benny Davis and Abner Silver and performed by Eddie Fisher featuring Hugo Winterhalter and His Orchestra. It reached number 7 on the U.S. pop chart in 1953.

The song ranked number 28 on Billboard magazine's Top 30 singles of 1953.

== Other charting versions ==
- Shirley Bassey released a version which reached number 38 on the UK Singles Chart in 1960.
- Tom Jones released a version which reached number 3 on the adult contemporary chart, number 13 on the UK Singles Chart, and number 27 on the U.S. pop chart in 1965.

== Other versions ==
The following additional artists have released recordings of the song:

- The Mariners, release as a single in 1951, though it did not chart
- Jo Stafford and Nelson Eddy featuring Paul Weston and His Orchestra, released as a single in 1951, though it did not chart.
- Guy Lombardo and His Royal Canadians, released as the B-side to their 1951 single "Lonesome and Sorry"
- Charlie Kunz, on his 1953 EP
- Bob Haymes featuring Jimmy Carroll and His Orchestra, released as a single in 1954, though it did not chart
- Johnnie Ray, on his 1954 album At the London Palladium
- Jerry Lewis featuring Jack Pleis and His Orchestra released a version of the song as the B-side to their 1957 single "My Mammy".
- Mantovani and His Orchestra, on their 1959 album Songs to Remember
- Roger Williams, on his 1959 album With These Hands
- Fela Sowande and His Quiet Rhythm, on their 1961 album Softly, Softly
- Richard Tucker, released as the B-side to his 1962 single "The Exodus Song"
- The Bachelors, on their 1964 album The Bachelors and 16 Great Songs
- Vera Lynn, on her 1964 album The Wonderful Vera
- P. J. Proby, on his 1965 album P. J. Proby
- The Harold Betters Sound, on his 1966 album Ram-Bunk-Shush
- Sarah Vaughan, on her 1966 album The New Scene
- The Temptations, on their 1967 album The Temptations in a Mellow Mood
- Dionne Warwick, as part of a medley with "One Hand, One Heart" on her 1967 album On Stage and in the Movies
- Hugh X. Lewis, as the B-side to his 1968 single "War Is Hell"
- Jackie Wilson, on his 1968 album Do Your Thing
- The Artistics, on their 1969 album What Happened
- The Delfonics, on their 1969 album Sound of Sexy Soul
- Les McCann, released as a single in 1969, though it did not chart
- The Manhattans, on their 1970 album With These Hands
- Frankie Vaughan, released as the B-side to his 1970 single "I'll Give You Three Guesses"
- Jim Nabors, on his 1971 album For the Good Times - The Jim Nabors Hour
- John Davidson, on his 1976 album Every Time I Sing a Love Song
- Tammy Jones, on her 1978 album The Best of Tammy Jones
- Lee Lawrence featuring Bruce Campbell and His Orchestra, on his 1983 album Fascination
- André Hazes, on his 1984 album Zoals U Wenst Mevrouw!
- Matt Monro, on his 1989 album A Time for Love
- Joe Sample featuring Howard Hewett, on his 2002 album The Pecan Tree

== In popular culture ==
- Tom Jones's version was featured in the 1990 film Edward Scissorhands.
- Proby's version was featured in the 2013 film The Oxbow Cure.
