= List of UK top-ten albums in 1971 =

The UK Albums Chart is one of many music charts compiled by the Official Charts Company that calculates the best-selling albums of the week in the United Kingdom. Before 2004, the chart was only based on the sales of physical albums. This list shows albums that peaked in the Top 10 of the UK Albums Chart during 1971, as well as albums which peaked in 1970 and 1972 but were in the top 10 in 1971. The entry date is when the album appeared in the top ten for the first time (week ending, as published by the Official Charts Company, which is six days after the chart is announced).

The first new number-one album of the year was by All Things Must Pass by George Harrison. Overall, fourteen different albums peaked at number one in 1971, with Various artists (4) having the most albums hit that position.

== Top-ten albums ==
Key

Symbol	Meaning
‡	Album peaked in 1965, 1969 or 1970 but still in chart in 1971.
♦	Album released in 1971 but peaked in 1972.
Entered	The date that the album first appeared in the chart.
Peak	Highest position that the album reached in the UK Albums Chart.

Entered (week ending)	Weeks in top 10	Single	Artist	Peak	Peak reached (week ending)	Weeks at peak
Albums in 1965
17 April 1965	233	The Sound of Music: Original Soundtrack ‡	Various artists	1	5 June 1965	70
Albums in 1969
14 June 1969	9	My Way ‡	Frank Sinatra	2	14 June 1969	3
6 September 1969	26	At San Quentin ‡	Johnny Cash	2	27 September 1969	2
8 November 1969	54	Led Zeppelin II ‡	Led Zeppelin	1	7 February 1970	1
Albums in 1970
21 February 1970	135	Bridge Over Troubled Water ‡	Simon & Garfunkel	1	21 February 1970	33
11 April 1970	38	Andy Williams' Greatest Hits ‡	Andy Williams	1	5 December 1970	5
23 May 1970	19	Let it Be ‡	The Beatles	1	23 May 1970	3
27 June 1970	27	Deep Purple in Rock ‡	Deep Purple	4	27 June 1970	2
10 October 1970	10	Candles in the Rain ‡	Melanie	5	28 November 1970	1
24 October 1970	22	Motown Chartbusters Volume 4 ‡	Various artists	1	31 October 1970	1
7 November 1970	22	Led Zeppelin III ‡	Led Zeppelin	1	7 November 1970	4
5 December 1970	9	Emerson, Lake & Palmer ‡	Emerson, Lake & Palmer	4	12 December 1970	1
19 December 1970	7	Greatest Hits, Vol. II ‡	Frank Sinatra	6	26 December 1970	2
Albums in 1971
9 January 1971	11	All Things Must Pass	George Harrison	1	6 February 1971	8
16 January 1971	1	After the Goldrush	Neil Young	7	16 January 1971	1
16 January 1971	2	Watt	Ten Years After	5	23 January 1971	1
23 January 1971	10	Sweet Baby James	James Taylor	6	20 February 1971	1
23 January 1971	11	Tumbleweed Connection	Elton John	2	27 February 1971	3
30 January 1971	2	Air Conditioning	Curved Air	8	30 January 1971	1
30 January 1971	1	McGuinness Flint	McGuinness Flint	9	30 January 1971	1
6 February 1971	1	John Lennon/Plastic Ono Band	John Lennon with the Plastic Ono Band	8	6 February 1971	1
6 February 1971	2	T. Rex	T. Rex	7	13 February 1971	1
13 February 1971	6	Pendulum	Creedence Clearwater Revival	8	20 February 1971	2
27 February 1971	5	Elton John	Elton John	5	6 March 1971	1
27 February 1971	3	Stephen Stills	Stephen Stills	8	20 March 1971	1
6 March 1971	9	The Yes Album	Yes	4	20 March 1971	2
13 March 1971	2	Chicago III	Chicago	9	27 March 1971	1
27 March 1971	16	Home Lovin' Man	Andy Williams	1	3 April 1971	2
3 April 1971	7	The Cry of Love	Jimi Hendrix	2	3 April 1971	2
3 April 1971	2	Stone Age	The Rolling Stones	4	3 April 1971	1
3 April 1971	8	Aqualung	Jethro Tull	4	10 April 1971	1
3 April 1971	3	Portrait in Music	Burt Bacharach	5	10 April 1971	1
10 April 1971	3	Elvis Country (I'm 10,000 Years Old)	Elvis Presley	6	10 April 1971	1
17 April 1971	19	Motown Chartbusters Volume 5	Various artists	1	17 April 1971	3
17 April 1971	2	Elegy	The Nice	5	24 April 1971	1
24 April 1971	6	Songs of Love and Hate	Leonard Cohen	4	24 April 1971	3
1 May 1971	9	Split	The Groundhogs	5	1 May 1971	1
8 May 1971	15	Sticky Fingers	The Rolling Stones	1	8 May 1971	5
8 May 1971	9	Symphonies for the Seventies	Waldo de los Ríos	6	8 May 1971	4
15 May 1971	2	Something Else	Shirley Bassey	7	22 May 1971	1
22 May 1971	2	4 Way Street	Crosby, Stills, Nash & Young	5	29 May 1971	1
29 May 1971	17	Mud Slide Slim and the Blue Horizon	James Taylor	4	29 May 1971	2
29 May 1971	1	The Good Book	Melanie	9	29 May 1971	1
5 June 1971	15	Ram	Paul and Linda McCartney	1	5 June 1971	2
5 June 1971	2	She's a Lady	Tom Jones	9	5 June 1971	2
19 June 1971	10	Tarkus	Emerson, Lake & Palmer	1	26 June 1971	1
19 June 1971	2	Sinatra & Company	Frank Sinatra	9	26 June 1971	1
26 June 1971	6	Free Live!	Free	4	3 July 1971	1
3 July 1971	1	Angel Delight	Fairport Convention	8	3 July 1971	1
10 July 1971	3	The Magnificent 7	The Supremes and the Four Tops	6	10 July 1971	1
10 July 1971	3	Love Story: Original Soundtrack	Various artists	10	10 July 1971	3
24 July 1971	2	Love Letters from Elvis	Elvis Presley	7	31 July 1971	1
31 July 1971	2	Blue	Joni Mitchell	3	31 July 1971	1
31 July 1971	26	Every Picture Tells a Story	Rod Stewart	1	2 October 1971	6
7 August 1971	5	Hot Hits 6	Various artists	1	7 August 1971	1
7 August 1971	9	Every Good Boy Deserves Favour	The Moody Blues	1	14 August 1971	1
7 August 1971	8	Top of the Pops, Volume 18	Various artists	1	21 August 1971	3
7 August 1971	2	Jim Reeves' Golden Records	Jim Reeves	9	7 August 1971	1
14 August 1971	5	C'mon Everybody	Elvis Presley	5	21 August 1971	1
21 August 1971	1	The Intimate Jim Reeves	Jim Reeves	8	21 August 1971	1
28 August 1971	3	Master of Reality	Black Sabbath	5	28 August 1971	2
28 August 1971	18	Tapestry	Carole King	4	4 September 1971	1
4 September 1971	1	Experience	Jimi Hendrix	9	4 September 1971	1
11 September 1971	7	Who's Next	The Who	1	18 September 1971	1
18 September 1971	7	Fireball	Deep Purple	1	25 September 1971	1
2 October 1971	4	Top of the Pops, Volume 19	Various artists	3	2 October 1971	3
2 October 1971	19	Teaser and the Firecat ♦	Cat Stevens	2	22 January 1972	1
9 October 1971	29	Electric Warrior	T. Rex	1	18 December 1971	8
9 October 1971	1	I'm Still Waiting	Diana Ross	10	18 December 1971	1
16 October 1971	1	The World of Your 100 Best Tunes Vol. 2	Various artists	9	16 October 1971	1
23 October 1971	12	Motown Chartbusters Volume 6	Various artists	2	23 October 1971	1
23 October 1971	5	Hot Hits 7	Various artists	3	23 October 1971	2
30 October 1971	19	Imagine	John Lennon	1	30 October 1971	2
6 November 1971	2	The World of Your 100 Best Tunes	Various artists	10	6 November 1971	2
20 November 1971	5	Top of the Pops, Volume 20	Various artists	1	27 November 1971	1
20 November 1971	2	Santana III	Santana	6	20 November 1971	1
20 November 1971	2	Meddle	Pink Floyd	3	27 November 1971	1
27 November 1971	3	This is Pourcel	Franck Pourcel	8	27 November 1971	2
27 November 1971	13	Led Zeppelin IV	Led Zeppelin	1	4 December 1971	2
4 December 1971	5	Pictures at an Exhibition	Emerson, Lake & Palmer	3	4 December 1971	2
4 December 1971	1	Fragile	Yes	7	4 December 1971	1
11 December 1971	4	Twelve Songs of Christmas (RCA Camden Reissue)	Jim Reeves	3	25 December 1971	2
18 December 1971	3	Hot Hits 8	Various artists	2	18 December 1971	3
25 December 1971	2	Elvis' Christmas Album (RCA Camden Reissue)	Elvis Presley	7	25 December 1971	2
25 December 1971	12	A Nod Is As Good As a Wink... to a Blind Horse ♦	Faces	2	5 February 1972	1

== See also ==
- 1971 in British music
- List of number-one albums from the 1970s (UK)
