= List of UK top-ten albums in 1970 =

The UK Albums Chart is one of many music charts compiled by the Official Charts Company that calculates the best-selling albums of the week in the United Kingdom. Before 2004, the chart was only based on the sales of physical albums. This list shows albums that peaked in the Top 10 of the UK Albums Chart during 1970, as well as albums which peaked in 1969 but were in the top 10 in 1970. The entry date is when the album appeared in the top ten for the first time (week ending, as published by the Official Charts Company, which is six days after the chart is announced).

The first new number-one album of the year was by Led Zeppelin II by Led Zeppelin. Overall, fourteen different albums peaked at number one in 1970, with Led Zeppelin (2) having the most albums hit that position.

== Top-ten albums ==
Key

Symbol	Meaning
‡	Album peaked in 1965 or 1969 but still in chart in 1970.
Entered	The date that the album first appeared in the chart.
Peak	Highest position that the album reached in the UK Albums Chart.

Entered (week ending)	Weeks in top 10	Single	Artist	Peak	Peak reached (week ending)	Weeks at peak
Albums in 1965
17 April 1965	233	The Sound of Music: Original Soundtrack ‡	Various artists	1	5 June 1965	70
Albums in 1968
23 November 1968	46	The Best of The Seekers ‡	The Seekers	1	25 January 1969	6
Albums in 1969
15 February 1969	27	Oliver!: Original Soundtrack ‡	Various artists	4	13 September 1969	1
14 June 1969	9	My Way ‡	Frank Sinatra	2	14 June 1969	3
6 September 1969	26	At San Quentin ‡	Johnny Cash	2	27 September 1969	2
27 September 1969	13	Through the Past, Darkly (Big Hits Vol. 2) ‡	The Rolling Stones	2	11 October 1969	2
4 October 1969	31	Abbey Road ‡	The Beatles	1	4 October 1969	17
25 October 1969	30	Motown Chartbusters Volume 3	Various artists	1	14 February 1970	1
1 November 1969	5	In the Court of the Crimson King ‡	King Crimson	5	1 November 1969	1
8 November 1969	54	Led Zeppelin II	Led Zeppelin	1	7 February 1970	1
22 November 1969	17	Tom Jones Live in Las Vegas	Tom Jones	2	10 January 1970	1
6 December 1969	8	To Our Children's Children's Children ‡	The Moody Blues	2	13 December 1969	1
13 December 1969	7	Engelbert Humperdinck ‡	Engelbert Humperdinck	5	13 December 1969	1
20 December 1969	9	Let It Bleed ‡	The Rolling Stones	1	20 December 1969	1
Albums in 1970
17 January 1970	1	Going Places ^{[A]}	Herb Alpert & the Tijuana Brass	8	17 January 1970	1
24 January 1970	33	Easy Rider: Songs As Performed in the Motion Picture	Various artists	2	4 April 1970	1
31 January 1970	5	Basket of Light	Pentangle	5	21 February 1970	1
7 February 1970	4	A Song for Me	Family	4	7 February 1970	1
7 February 1970	2	Chicago Transit Authority	Chicago Transit Authority	9	7 February 1970	2
21 February 1970	135	Bridge Over Troubled Water	Simon & Garfunkel	1	21 February 1970	33
21 February 1970	3	The Canned Heat Cookbook: The Best of Canned Heat	Canned Heat	8	21 February 1970	1
28 February 1970	25	Paint Your Wagon: Original Soundtrack	Various artists	2	14 March 1970	3
7 March 1970	4	Hello, I'm Johnny Cash	Johnny Cash	6	7 March 1970	1
14 March 1970	4	From Memphis to Vegas/From Vegas to Memphis	Elvis Presley	3	21 March 1970	1
28 March 1970	3	Willy and the Poor Boys	Creedence Clearwater Revival	10	28 March 1970	3
4 April 1970	4	Chicago	Chicago	6	4 April 1970	1
4 April 1970	6	Black Sabbath	Black Sabbath	8	16 May 1970	2
11 April 1970	38	Andy Williams' Greatest Hits	Andy Williams	1	5 December 1970	5
11 April 1970	1	Empty Rooms	John Mayall	9	11 April 1970	1
18 April 1970	1	Hot Rats	Frank Zappa	9	18 April 1970	1
18 April 1970	1	The Exquisite Nana Mouskouri	Nana Mouskouri	10	18 April 1970	1
25 April 1970	1	Sentimental Journey	Ringo Starr	7	25 April 1970	1
25 April 1970	5	Tom	Tom Jones	4	2 May 1970	1
2 May 1970	18	McCartney	Paul McCartney	2	2 May 1970	3
2 May 1970	1	Getting to This	Blodwyn Pig	8	2 May 1970	1
9 May 1970	5	Cricklewood Green	Ten Years After	4	9 May 1970	1
9 May 1970	4	Benefit	Jethro Tull	3	16 May 1970	1
16 May 1970	6	The World Beaters Sing the World Beaters	England World Cup Squad 1970	4	16 May 1970	1
23 May 1970	19	Let it Be	The Beatles	1	23 May 1970	3
30 May 1970	3	In the Wake of Poseidon	King Crimson	4	30 May 1970	1
6 June 1970	6	Live at Leeds	The Who	3	13 June 1970	2
6 June 1970	5	Déjà Vu	Crosby, Stills, Nash & Young	5	6 June 1970	3
13 June 1970	2	Ladies of the Canyon	Joni Mitchell	8	13 June 1970	1
20 June 1970	1	Greatest Hits: Sixteen Great Titles	Herb Alpert & the Tijuana Brass	8	20 June 1970	1
27 June 1970	27	Deep Purple in Rock	Deep Purple	4	27 June 1970	2
27 June 1970	1	Thank Christ for the Bomb	The Groundhogs	9	27 June 1970	1
4 July 1970	3	Five Bridges	The Nice	2	4 July 1970	1
4 July 1970	3	Live Cream	Cream	4	11 July 1970	1
4 July 1970	2	Band of Gypsys	Jimi Hendrix	6	4 July 1970	1
11 July 1970	6	Self Portrait	Bob Dylan	1	11 July 1970	1
11 July 1970	7	Fire and Water	Free	2	18 July 1970	3
1 August 1970	8	On Stage, February 1970	Elvis Presley	2	15 August 1970	1
15 August 1970	10	A Question of Balance	The Moody Blues	1	22 August 1970	3
22 August 1970	5	The World of Johnny Cash	Johnny Cash	5	29 August 1970	1
29 August 1970	8	Can't Help Falling in Love	Andy Williams	7	26 December 1970	3
5 September 1970	4	Something	Shirley Bassey	5	12 September 1970	1
12 September 1970	9	Cosmo's Factory	Creedence Clearwater Revival	1	12 September 1970	1
19 September 1970	7	Get Yer Ya-Ya's Out! The Rolling Stones in Concert	The Rolling Stones	1	19 September 1970	2
19 September 1970	4	The Everly Brothers' Original Greatest Hits	The Everly Brothers	7	19 September 1970	2
26 September 1970	5	Greatest Hits	The Beach Boys	5	26 September 1970	1
3 October 1970	9	Paranoid	Black Sabbath	1	10 October 1970	1
10 October 1970	10	Candles in the Rain	Melanie	5	28 November 1970	1
24 October 1970	5	Atom Heart Mother	Pink Floyd	1	24 October 1970	1
24 October 1970	22	Motown Chartbusters Volume 4	Various artists	1	31 October 1970	1
7 November 1970	22	Led Zeppelin III	Led Zeppelin	1	7 November 1970	4
28 November 1970	3	New Morning	Bob Dylan	1	28 November 1970	1
28 November 1970	1	Anyway	Family	7	28 November 1970	1
5 December 1970	9	Emerson, Lake & Palmer	Emerson, Lake & Palmer	4	12 December 1970	1
5 December 1970	1	Abraxas	Santana	7	5 December 1970	1
5 December 1970	1	I Who Have Nothing	Tom Jones	10	5 December 1970	1
12 December 1970	1	Over and Over	Nana Mouskouri	10	12 December 1970	1
19 December 1970	7	Greatest Hits, Vol. II	Frank Sinatra	6	26 December 1970	2
19 December 1970	1	The Andy Williams Show	Andy Williams	10	19 December 1970	1

== Notes ==
- ^{a} Going Places originally peaked at number 4 upon its release in 1966. It re-entered the top 10 at number 8 on 17 January 1970 (week ending).

== See also ==
- 1970 in British music
- List of number-one albums from the 1970s (UK)
