= List of best-selling albums of the 1960s in the United Kingdom =

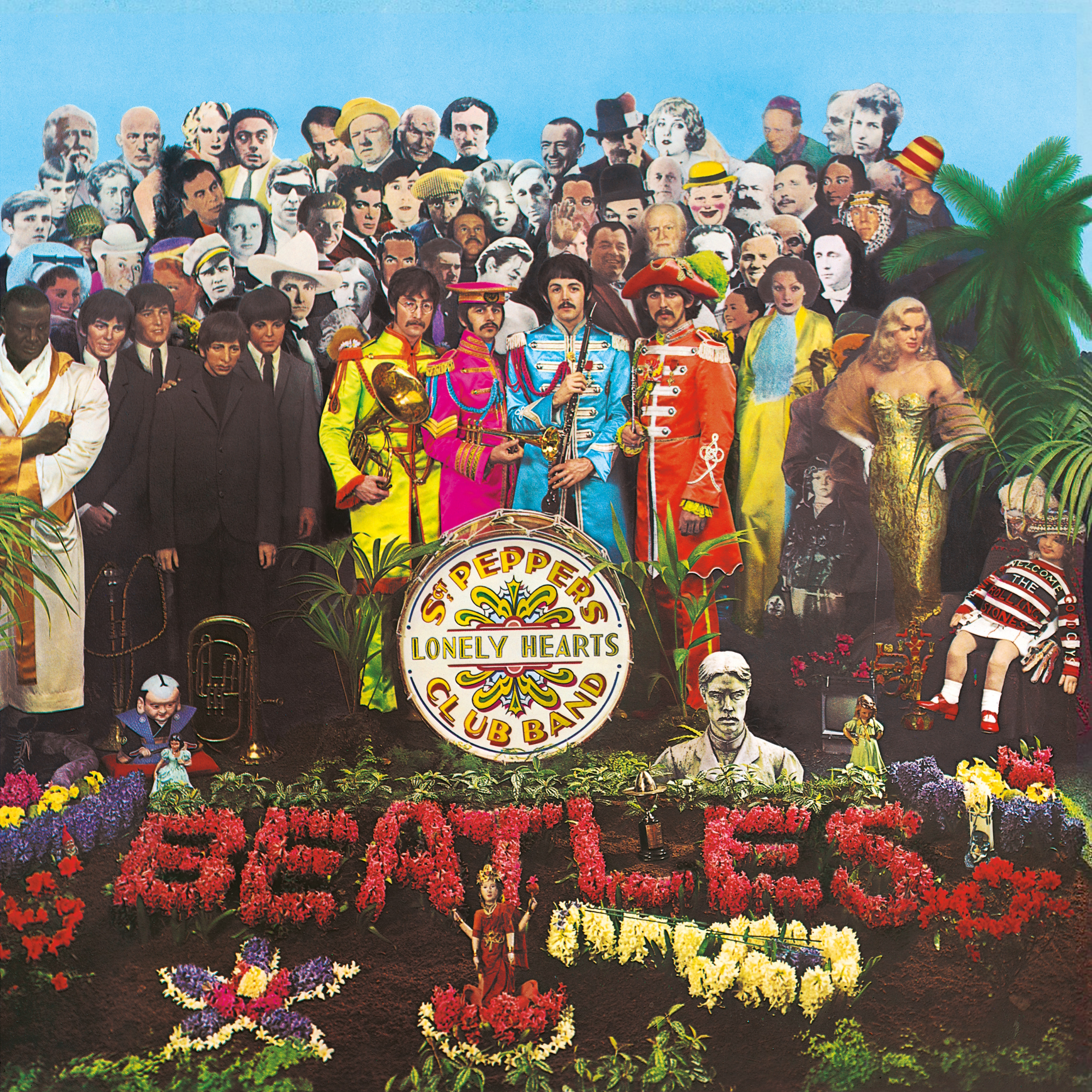
Sgt. Pepper's Lonely Hearts Club Band by the Beatles was the best-selling album of the 1960s.

An album is defined by the Official Charts Company (OCC) as being a type of music release that features more than four tracks and lasts longer than 25 minutes; during the 1960s, sales of albums in the United Kingdom were compiled by several different magazines, including New Musical Express (NME), Record Retailer, Melody Maker, Disc and Record Mirror. The UK Albums Chart was first officially published in February 1969 when Record Retailers and the BBC jointly commissioned the British Market Research Bureau (BMRB) to record sales of albums. For dates between March 1960 and February 1969, the albums chart produced by Record Retailer is regarded by the OCC as being canonical to the UK Albums Chart; for dates before March 1960, the OCC considers the albums chart created by NME to be canonical. The biggest-selling album of the 1960s was Sgt. Pepper's Lonely Hearts Club Band by The Beatles—of the top thirteen biggest-selling albums of the decade, ten were by The Beatles, the other three being motion picture soundtracks.

== Albums ==
Best-selling albums of the 1960s in the UK
Position	Album	Artist	Record label (Note: The record labels, years and chart peaks are those given by the OCC.)	Year	Peak on the UK Albums Chart
1	Sgt. Pepper's Lonely Hearts Club Band	The Beatles	Parlophone	1967	1
2	The Sound of Music	Original soundtrack	RCA Victor	1965	1
3	With the Beatles	The Beatles	Parlophone	1963	1
4	Abbey Road	The Beatles	Apple	1969	1
5	South Pacific	Original soundtrack	RCA Victor	1962	1
6	Beatles for Sale	The Beatles	Parlophone	1964	1
7	A Hard Day's Night	The Beatles	Parlophone	1964	1
8	Rubber Soul	The Beatles	Parlophone	1965	1
9	The Beatles	The Beatles	Apple	1968	1
10	West Side Story	Original soundtrack	Philips	1962	1
11	Revolver	The Beatles	Parlophone	1966	1
12	Please Please Me	The Beatles	Parlophone	1963	1
13	Help!	The Beatles	Parlophone	1965	1
14	Bookends	Simon & Garfunkel	CBS	1968	1
15	Best of The Beach Boys	The Beach Boys	Capitol	1966	2
16	Sounds of Silence	Simon & Garfunkel	CBS	1966	13
17	The Best of The Seekers	The Seekers	Columbia	1968	1
18	The Rolling Stones No. 2	The Rolling Stones	Decca	1965	1
19	Parsley, Sage, Rosemary and Thyme	Simon & Garfunkel	CBS	1968	13
20	The Black and White Minstrel Show	George Mitchell Minstrels	His Master's Voice	1960	1
