= His Orchestra, His Chorus, His Singers, His Sound =

Studio album by Ray Conniff
- Released: 1969
- Genre: Easy Listening

His Orchestra, His Chorus, His Singers, His Sound is the only number-one album in the UK for American bandleader and trombonist Ray Conniff.

== Overview ==
The album spent three weeks at the top of the UK Top Albums chart in 1969. It was one of the very few UK Number 1 albums never to have had an official CD release.

== Track listing ==
1. "Memories Are Made of This"
2. "I've Got You Under My Skin"
3. "Volare"
4. "They Can't Take You Away from Me"
5. "Greenfields"
6. "Melodie D'Amour"
7. "Days of Wine and Roses"
8. "Spanish Eyes"
9. "Somewhere My Love"
10. "Mrs. Robinson"
11. "Up, Up and Away"

Preceded by Nashville Skyline by Bob Dylan	UK Albums Chart number-one album 21 June 1969 – 11 July 1969	Succeeded by According to My Heart by Jim Reeves
