= List of UK top-ten albums in 1972 =

The UK Albums Chart is one of many music charts compiled by the Official Charts Company that calculates the best-selling albums of the week in the United Kingdom. Before 2004, the chart was only based on the sales of physical albums. This list shows albums that peaked in the Top 10 of the UK Albums Chart during 1972, as well as albums which peaked in 1971 and 1973 but were in the top 10 in 1972. The entry date is when the album appeared in the top ten for the first time (week ending, as published by the Official Charts Company, which is six days after the chart is announced).

The first new number-one album of the year was by The Concert for Bangladesh by George Harrison & Friends. Overall, fourteen different albums peaked at number one in 1972, with Various artists (4) having the most albums hit that position.

== Top-ten albums ==
Key

Symbol	Meaning
‡	Album peaked in 1970 or 1971 but still in chart in 1972.
♦	Album released in 1972 but peaked in 1973.
Entered	The date that the album first appeared in the chart.
Peak	Highest position that the album reached in the UK Albums Chart.

Entered (week ending)	Weeks in top 10	Single	Artist	Peak	Peak reached (week ending)	Weeks at peak
Albums in 1970
21 February 1970	135	Bridge Over Troubled Water ‡	Simon & Garfunkel	1	21 February 1970	33
Albums in 1971
31 July 1971	26	Every Picture Tells a Story ‡	Rod Stewart	1	2 October 1971	6
28 August 1971	18	Tapestry ‡	Carole King	4	4 September 1971	1
18 September 1971	7	Fireball ‡	Deep Purple	1	25 October 1971	1
2 October 1971	19	Teaser and the Firecat	Cat Stevens	2	22 January 1972	1
9 October 1971	29	Electric Warrior ‡	T. Rex	1	18 December 1971	8
23 October 1971	12	Motown Chartbusters Volume 6 ‡	Various artists	2	23 October 1971	1
30 October 1971	19	Imagine ‡	John Lennon	1	30 October 1971	2
27 November 1971	13	Led Zeppelin IV ‡	Led Zeppelin	1	4 December 1971	2
11 December 1971	4	Twelve Songs of Christmas (RCA Camden Reissue) ‡	Jim Reeves	3	25 December 1971	2
18 December 1971	3	Hot Hits 8 ‡	Various artists	2	18 December 1971	3
25 December 1971	2	Elvis' Christmas Album (RCA Camden Reissue) ‡	Elvis Presley	7	25 December 1971	2
25 December 1971	12	A Nod Is As Good As a Wink... to a Blind Horse	Faces	2	5 February 1972	1
Albums in 1972
8 January 1972	1	Words and Music	Benny Hill	9	8 January 1972	1
15 January 1972	1	Meaty Beaty Big and Bouncy	The Who	9	15 January 1972	1
15 January 1972	21	Fog on the Tyne	Lindisfarne	1	25 March 1972	4
22 January 1972	3	Jesus Christ Superstar	Various artists	6	22 January 1972	1
22 January 1972	8	Himself	Gilbert O'Sullivan	5	8 April 1972	1
22 January 1972	5	The Concert for Bangladesh	George Harrison & Friends	1	29 January 1972	1
5 February 1972	10	Neil Reid	Neil Reid	1	19 February 1972	3
12 February 1972	4	Hendrix in the West	Jimi Hendrix	7	19 February 1972	2
26 February 1972	14	Paul Simon	Paul Simon	1	18 March 1972	1
26 February 1972	12	Nilsson Schmilsson	Nilsson	4	25 March 1972	3
4 March 1972	12	Harvest	Neil Young	1	11 March 1972	1
18 March 1972	4	Thick as a Brick	Jethro Tull	5	1 April 1972	1
25 March 1972	2	Who Will Save the World? The Mighty Groundhogs	The Groundhogs	8	25 March 1972	1
1 April 1972	1	Baby I'm-a Want You	Bread	9	1 April 1972	1
8 April 1972	7	We'd Like to Teach the World to Sing	The New Seekers	2	8 April 1972	2
8 April 1972	16	American Pie	Don McLean	2	24 June 1972	3
15 April 1972	8	Machine Head	Deep Purple	1	22 April 1972	3
15 April 1972	22	Slade Alive!	Slade	2	8 July 1972	1
29 April 1972	5	Prophets, Seers & Sages/My People Were Fair	Tyrannosaurus Rex	1	6 May 1972	1
13 May 1972	1	A Song for You	Jack Jones	9	13 May 1972	1
20 May 1972	9	Bolan Boogie	T. Rex	1	20 May 1972	3
20 May 1972	4	Argus	Wishbone Ash	3	20 May 1972	1
20 May 1972	10	Cherish	David Cassidy	2	27 May 1972	1
27 May 1972	1	Live in Europe	Rory Gallagher	9	27 May 1972	1
27 May 1972	1	The Music People	Various artists	10	27 May 1972	1
3 June 1972	7	Honky Château	Elton John	2	3 June 1972	2
3 June 1972	1	A Thing Called Love	Johnny Cash	8	3 June 1972	1
3 June 1972	2	Nicely Out of Tune	Lindisfarne	8	24 June 1972	1
10 June 1972	5	Exile on Main St.	The Rolling Stones	1	10 June 1972	1
10 June 1972	15	20 Dynamic Hits	Various artists	1	17 June 1972	8
10 June 1972	4	Bread Winners	Jack Jones	7	17 June 1972	1
17 June 1972	4	Obscured by Clouds	Pink Floyd	6	1 July 1972	1
24 June 1972	1	Free at Last	Free	9	24 June 1972	1
8 July 1972	20	The Rise and Fall of Ziggy Stardust and the Spiders from Mars ♦	David Bowie	5	10 February 1973	1
15 July 1972	5	Trilogy	Emerson, Lake & Palmer	2	15 July 1972	1
15 July 1972	2	Living in the Past	Jethro Tull	8	15 July 1972	1
22 July 1972	3	Elvis: As Recorded at Madison Square Garden	Elvis Presley	3	22 July 1972	1
22 July 1972	59	Simon and Garfunkel's Greatest Hits	Simon & Garfunkel	2	29 July 1972	3
22 July 1972	11	School's Out	Alice Cooper	4	9 September 1972	1
29 July 1972	15	20 Fantastic Hits	Various artists	1	12 August 1972	6
5 August 1972	7	The Slider	T. Rex	4	5 August 1972	1
5 August 1972	20	Never a Dull Moment	Rod Stewart	1	16 September 1972	2
12 August 1972	5	Moods	Neil Diamond	7	16 September 1972	2
30 September 1972	4	Close to the Edge	Yes	4	30 September 1972	1
30 September 1972	5	Dingly Dell	Lindisfarne	5	30 September 1972	1
30 September 1972	7	Sing Along with Max	Max Bygraves	4	28 October 1972	2
30 September 1972	1	Roxy Music	Roxy Music	10	30 September 1972	1
7 October 1972	15	20 All Time Greats of the 50s	Various artists	1	7 October 1972	11
7 October 1972	10	Catch Bull at Four	Cat Stevens	2	14 October 1972	2
7 October 1972	5	Black Sabbath Vol. 4	Black Sabbath	8	7 October 1972	1
21 October 1972	9	20 Star Tracks	Various artists	2	4 November 1972	2
4 November 1972	2	Glitter	Gary Glitter	8	4 November 1972	2
4 November 1972	3	The Best of Bread	Bread	7	4 November 1972	1
18 November 1972	22	Back to Front ♦	Gilbert O'Sullivan	1	20 January 1973	1
18 November 1972	1	The Last Goon Show Ever	The Goons	8	18 November 1972	1
25 November 1972	9	22 Dynamic Hits Vol. 2	Various artists	2	23 December 1972	2
25 November 1972	10	20 Fantastic Hits Vol. 2	Various artists	2	9 December 1972	3
25 November 1972	1	Caravanserai	Santana	6	25 November 1972	1
2 December 1972	15	25 Rockin' and Rollin' Greats	Various artists	1	2 December 1972	11
2 December 1972	3	Seventh Sojourn	The Moody Blues	5	2 December 1972	1
2 December 1972	11	Portrait of Donny ♦	Donny Osmond	5	20 January 1973	1
9 December 1972	16	Slayed? ♦	Slade	1	13 January 1973	3
9 December 1972	1	Motown Chartbusters Volume 7	Various artists	9	9 December 1972	1
23 December 1972	8	Too Young	Donny Osmond	7	23 December 1972	5

== See also ==
- 1972 in British music
- List of number-one albums from the 1970s (UK)
