= 'Tops' with Me =

Studio album by Helen Shapiro
- Released: 1962
- Genre: Pop
- Length: 32.28
- Label: EMI Columbia Records

Helen Shapiro chronology
'Tops' with Me (1962)	Helen's Sixteen (1963)

Professional ratings
Review scores
Source	Rating
Uncut	2/5 stars

'Tops' with Me is the debut album by British singer Helen Shapiro. It was released in 1962 and was her most successful album, reaching number 2 in the UK Albums Chart. She was accompanied by Martin Slavin and his Orchestra.

The album comprised cover versions of songs which had already been hit singles for other artists – "top pops" or simply "tops" in the slang of the day.

== Track listing ==
Side One

1. "Little Devil" (Neil Sedaka, Howard Greenfield) - 2:27
2. "Will You Love Me Tomorrow" (Gerry Goffin, Carole King) - 3:19
3. "Because They're Young" (Aaron Schroeder, Don Costa, Wally Gold) 3:31
4. "The Day the Rains Came" (Gilbert Becaud. Pierre Delanoe) - 2:32
5. "Are You Lonesome Tonight" (Handman, Turk) - 2:45
6. "A Teenager in Love" (Doc Pomus, Mort Shuman) - 2:16

Side Two

1. "Lipstick on Your Collar" (Lewis, Goehring) - 2:16
2. "Beyond the Sea" (Charles Trenet, Jack Lawrence) - 3:26
3. "Sweet Nothin's" (Ronnie Self) - 2:36
4. "You Mean Ev'rything to Me" (Neil Sedaka, Howard Greenfield) - 2:34
5. "I Love You" (Bruce Welch) - 2:13
6. "You Got What It Takes" (Gordy, Davis) - 2:43
