= The Bachelors and 16 Great Songs =

Studio album by The Bachelors
- Released: June 19, 1964
- Genre: Pop, rock
- Label: Decca
- Producer: Dick Rowe

Professional ratings
Review scores
Source	Rating
Record Mirror	5/5 stars

The Bachelors and 16 Great Songs is an album by The Bachelors. It was released in 1964 and reached number two on the UK Albums Chart. It was the Christmas number two album that year.

== Track listing ==
1. "I Believe" (Al Stillman, Ervin Drake, Irwin Graham, Jimmy Shirl)
2. "Charmaine" (Ernö Rapée, Lew Pollack)
3. "You'll Never Walk Alone" (Richard Rodgers, Oscar Hammerstein)
4. "Diane" (Ernö Rapée, Lew Pollack)
5. "Whispering" (John Schonberger, Richard Coburn, Vincent Rose)
6. "Moonlight and Roses" (Ben Black, Edwin Henry Lemare, Neil Moret)
7. "I'll Be With You In Apple Blossom Time" (Albert Von Tilzer, Neville Fleeson)
8. "If" (Robert Hargreaves, Stanley Damerell, Tolchard Evans)
9. "With These Hands" (Abner Silver, Benny Davis)
10. "Ramona" (Mabel Wayne, Wolfe Gilbert)
11. "Put Your Arms Around Me, Honey" (Albert Von Tilzer, Junie McCree)
12. "Maybe" (George Gershwin, Ira Gershwin)
13. "Melody of Love" (Hans Engelmann, Tom Glazer)
14. "The Little White Cloud That Cried" (Johnnie Ray)
15. "I'll See You in My Dreams" (Gus Kahn, Isham Jones)
16. "Jailer Bring Me Water" (Bobby Darin)

== Chart performance ==
Chart (1964)	Peak position
UK Albums Chart	2
