= Freddie and the Dreamers (album) =

Studio album by Freddie and the Dreamers
- Released: 1963 (UK); 1965 (US)
- Recorded: 1963, England
- Genre: Rock
- Length: 32:37
- Label: Columbia, EMI
- Producer: John Burgess

Singles from Freddie and the Dreamers
- 1. "If You Gotta Make a Fool of Somebody" Released: June 1963; 2. "I Understand" Released: 1964

Freddie and the Dreamers is the debut album from the British Invasion band Freddie and the Dreamers from Manchester, England. It was released in the United Kingdom in 1963, peaking at number five in the UK Albums Chart and reaching number 19 in the US albums chart on May 22, 1965. It was the only 33 1/3 RPM record by the group to chart in America.

== Track listing ==
Side one

1. "If You Gotta Make a Fool of Somebody" (Rudy Clark) – 1:58
2. "Some Other Guy" (Richie Barrett, Jerry Leiber and Mike Stoller [as Elmo Glick]) – 2:05
3. "Somebody Else's Girl" (Montgomery) – 2:26
4. "Yes I Do" (MacLaine, Bocking, Weatton) – 1:50
5. "Zip-a-Dee-Doo-Dah" (Voc. Pete Birrell and Roy Crewdson) (Ray Gilbert, Allie Wrubel) – 3;15
6. "Drink This Up It'll Make You Sleep" (Mitch Murray) – 1:50
7. "I Understand" (Best) – 2:34

Side two

1. "Sally Anne" (Klein) – 1:58
2. "I'm a Hog for You" (Voc. Pete Birrell) (Jerry Leiber, Mike Stoller) – 2:10
3. "The Wedding" (Jay, Prieto) – 2:35
4. "Money (That's What I Want)" (Berry Gordy, Janie Bradford) – 2:23
5. "Crying" (Roy Orbison, Joe Melson) – 3:02
6. "He Got What He Wanted (but He Lost What He Had)" (Richard Penniman) – 2:09
7. "Kansas City" – 2:22

== Personnel ==
- Freddie Garrity – vocals
- Derek Quinn – lead guitar
- Roy Crewdson – rhythm guitar and vocals
- Pete Birrell – bass guitar and vocals
- Bernie Dwyer – drums
