= 32 Minutes and 17 Seconds with Cliff Richard =

1962 studio album by Cliff Richard

Studio album by Cliff Richard with The Shadows and Norrie Paramor and his Orchestra
- Released: 14 September 1962
- Recorded: December 1961 – May 1962
- Length: 32:17
- Label: Columbia (EMI) 33MSX.1431
- Producer: Norrie Paramor

Cliff Richard chronology
| The Young Ones (1962) | 32 Minutes and 17 Seconds with Cliff Richard (1962) | Summer Holiday (1963) |

Professional ratings
Review scores
| Source | Rating |
|---|---|
| New Record Mirror | 5/5 stars |

32 Minutes and 17 Seconds with Cliff Richard is the fifth studio album by Cliff Richard (seventh album overall) and was released in September 1962. The album reached #3 on the UK Albums Chart. The album contains 14 songs, six with the Shadows and eight with the Norrie Paramor Orchestra.

One single from the album, "It'll Be Me" was released in August 1962 in the lead up to the album's release and reached #2 in the UK Singles Chart.

In Canada, the album was released with the title "On Your Marks...Get Set...Lets Go!" It was released in June 1963 and spent six weeks at number 1 on Chum's Album Index during July and August and thirteen weeks in the top 5.

== Track listing ==
Side A
| No. | Title | Writer(s) | Length |
|---|---|---|---|
| 1. | "It'll Be Me" (with The Shadows) | Jack Clement | 1:55 |
| 2. | "So I've Been Told" (with The Shadows) | Bruce Welch | 2:28 |
| 3. | "How Long is Forever" (with Norrie Paramor and his Orchestra) | Chas McDevitt, Shirley Douglas | 2:23 |
| 4. | "I'm Walkin' the Blues" (with the Shadows) | Sid Tepper, Roy C. Bennett | 2:05 |
| 5. | "Turn Around" (with Norrie Paramor and his Orchestra) | Tepper-Bennett | 2:27 |
| 6. | "Blueberry Hill" (with the Shadows) | Lewis-Stock-Rose | 2:46 |
| 7. | "Let's Make a Memory" (with Norrie Paramor and his Orchestra) | Bill Crompton | 2:05 |

Side B
| No. | Title | Writer(s) | Length |
|---|---|---|---|
| 1. | "When My Dream Boat Comes Home" (with the Shadows) | Friend-Franklin | 1:48 |
| 2. | "I'm on My Way" (with Norrie Paramor and his Orchestra) | Tepper-Bennett | 2:56 |
| 3. | "Spanish Harlem" (with Norrie Paramor and his Orchestra) | Jerry Leiber, Phil Spector | 2:57 |
| 4. | "You Don't Know" (with The Shadows) | Walter Spriggs | 2:49 |
| 5. | "Falling in Love with Love" (with Norrie Paramor and his Orchestra) | Rodgers-Hart | 1:45 |
| 6. | "Who Are We to Say" (with Norrie Paramor and his Orchestra) | Kosloff-Pray | 2:44 |
| 7. | "I Wake Up Cryin'" (with Norrie Paramor and his Orchestra) | Burt Bacharach, Hal David | 2:10 |

== Personnel ==
Cliff Richard and the Shadows

- Cliff Richard – vocals
- Hank Marvin – lead guitar
- Bruce Welch – rhythm guitar
- Jet Harris – bass guitar
- Brian 'Licorice' Locking – bass guitar
- Brian Bennett – drums

== Chart performance ==
| Chart (1962–63) | Peak position |
|---|---|
| Canada Albums (CHUM) | 1 |
| UK Albums (Official Charts) | 3 |
