= The Best of The Seekers =

Greatest hits album by The Seekers
- Released: November 1968
- Recorded: 1964–67
- Genre: Folk, pop
- Label: EMI

The Seekers chronology
The Seekers' Greatest Hits (1968)	The Best of The Seekers (1968)	More of the Fabulous Seekers (1968)

The Best of The Seekers was released in UK by EMI's Columbia label (Catalogue No. SCX 6268) in 1968 on the break-up of The Seekers.

The album spent 117 weeks on the UK album chart (at the time a Top 50 listing), including six weeks at No.1 accumulated over five separate stints in the top spot in 1969, starting with the week of 25 January 1969.

It was the 17th biggest selling album in the 1960s in the UK.

== Track listing ==
Side One

1. "I'll Never Find Another You" (Tom Springfield)
2. "A World of Our Own" (Springfield)
3. "The Carnival Is Over" (Russian folk song - lyrics by Springfield)
4. "Someday One Day" (Simon)
5. "Walk With Me" (Springfield)
6. "We Shall Not Be Moved" (Trad-arr The Seekers)

Side Two

1. "Morningtown Ride" (Reynolds)
2. "When Will the Good Apples Fall" (Young)
3. "Island of Dreams" (Springfield)
4. "Open Up Them Pearly Gates" (Trad-arr The Seekers)
5. "Emerald City" (Kim Fowley, Keith Potger)
6. "Georgy Girl" (Springfield, Jim Dale)

== Chart positions ==
Chart (1969)	Peak position
UK Albums Chart	1

== See also ==
- List of UK Albums Chart number ones of the 1960s
- List of best-selling albums of the 1960s in the United Kingdom
