= George Mitchell (Scottish musician) =

Scottish musician (1917–2002)

- Born: 27 February 1917; Falkirk, Scotland
- Died: 27 August 2002 (aged 85); Albrighton, England
- Occupations: Musician, singer, television personality

George Mitchell (27 February 1917 – 27 August 2002) was a Scottish musician, best known for having devised the long-running The Black and White Minstrel Show.

== Biography ==
He was born in Falkirk, Scotland. Mitchell's grandfather was well-known Scottish choir master John Laing, and both of his parents were amateur singers. He was educated at Southgate County School in North London. Mitchell was an accountant before his World War II military service. During the war, he served with the Royal Army Pay Corps at Finsbury Circus. This posting enabled him to organise choirs within the armed forces and put on shows at the Cripplegate Theatre, among others. This led to appearances on many BBC Radio shows.

The choir continued after the war, and soon no radio programme was complete without its quota of Mitchell Singers, often performing under different names. Given their own radio show in 1950, the George Mitchell Glee Club, George and his singers continued to perform in hundreds of radio and stage shows and appeared in several films. They also had several hit records. In 1957, the George Mitchell Minstrels first appeared at the annual Earl's Court Radio Show, a programme which was televised. From 1958, the Minstrels, in red make-up which looked black on camera, became an enormous hit, with a peak viewing audience of 16.5 million viewers in 1964. It won the Golden Rose of Montreux for Best TV Show in the World in 1961.

The show appeared in a prime-time television slot for twenty years, as well as spawning two touring stage shows, one in the UK and one in Australia, and a permanent one in London which ran from 1962 until 1972 at the Victoria Palace Theatre, with a further year at the New Victoria. During the 1970s, the television show's popularity declined, partly because of the style of music becoming dated, and partly because of an increase in racial awareness. It was axed by the BBC after several unsuccessful attempts to change the format. The final episode was broadcast in 1978.

Mitchell was awarded the OBE in 1975.
