= List of UK Albums Chart number ones of the 1960s =

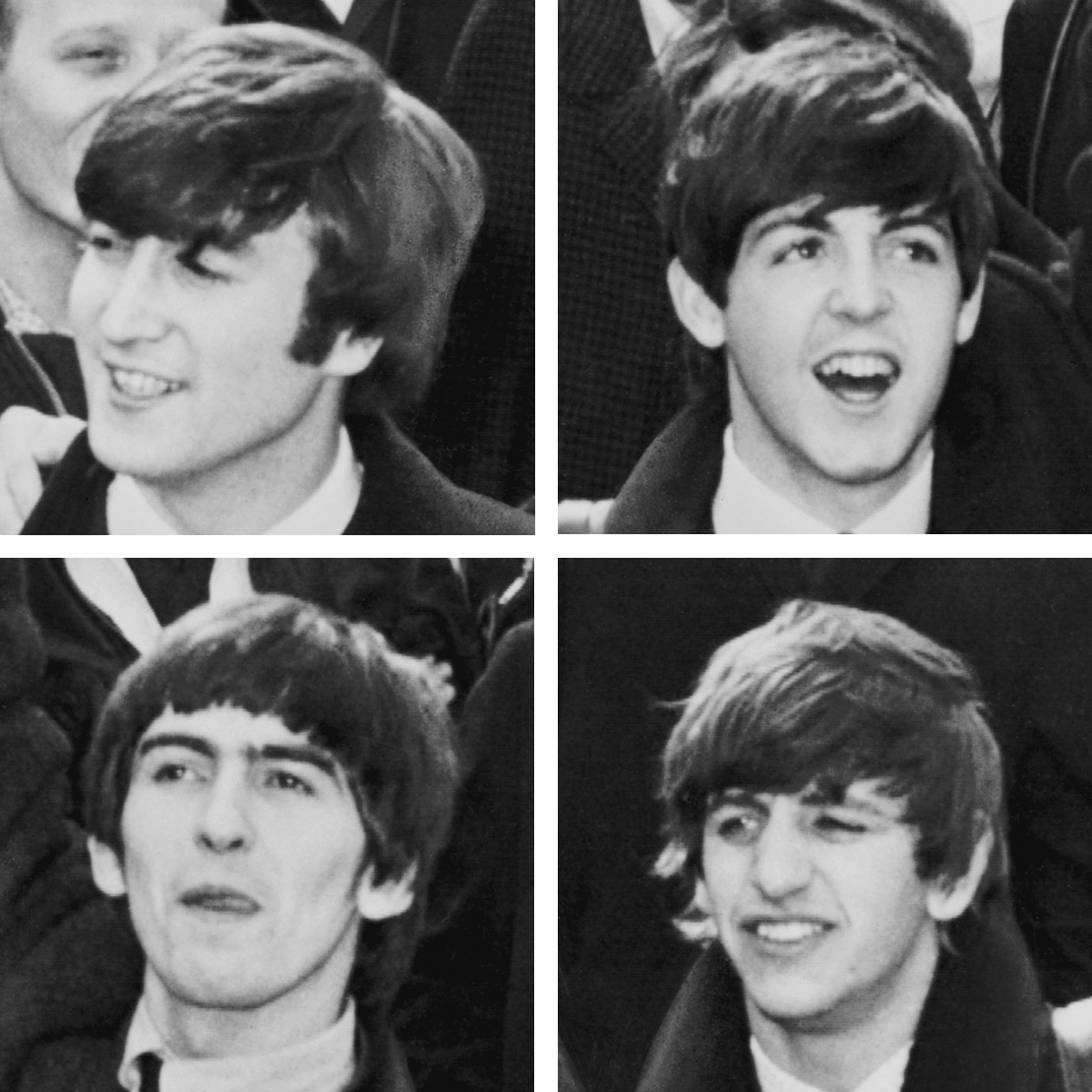
The Beatles topped the UK Album Chart for 155 weeks during the 1960s, longer than any other artist.

The UK Albums Chart is a record chart based on weekly album sales in the United Kingdom; during the 1960s, a total of 57 albums reached number one. The sources are the Melody Maker chart until March 1960, and the Record Retailer chart from March 1960 onwards.

== Number ones ==
Key
No.	nth album to top the UK Albums Chart
re	Return of an album to number one
†	Best-selling album of the year
‡	Best-selling album of the decade

No.	Artist (Note: The artist, album, date of reaching number one and number of weeks at number one are those given by the OCC.)	Album	Record label (Note: The record labels are those given by the OCC.)	Reached number one	Weeks at number one
1960
18	Freddy Cannon	The Explosive Freddy Cannon	Top Rank	6 March 1960	1
re	Original soundtrack	South Pacific †	RCA Victor	13 March 1960	19
19	Elvis Presley	Elvis Is Back!	RCA	24 July 1960	1
re	Original soundtrack	South Pacific †	RCA Victor	31 July 1960	5
20	101 Strings	Down Drury Lane to Memory Lane	Pye Golden Guinea	4 September 1960	5
re	Original soundtrack	South Pacific †	RCA Victor	9 October 1960	13
1961
21	Elvis Presley	G.I. Blues †	RCA	8 January 1961	7
re	Original soundtrack	South Pacific	RCA Victor	26 February 1961	1
re	Elvis Presley	G.I. Blues †	RCA	5 March 1961	3
re	Original soundtrack	South Pacific	RCA Victor	26 March 1961	1
re	Elvis Presley	G.I. Blues †	RCA	2 April 1961	12
re	Original soundtrack	South Pacific	RCA Victor	25 June 1961	4
22	George Mitchell Minstrels	The Black and White Minstrel Show	His Master's Voice	23 July 1961	4
re	Original soundtrack	South Pacific	RCA Victor	20 August 1961	1
re	George Mitchell Minstrels	The Black and White Minstrel Show	His Master's Voice	27 August 1961	1
re	Original soundtrack	South Pacific	RCA Victor	3 September 1961	1
re	George Mitchell Minstrels	The Black and White Minstrel Show	His Master's Voice	10 September 1961	1
23	The Shadows	The Shadows	Columbia	17 September 1961	4
re	George Mitchell Minstrels	The Black and White Minstrel Show	His Master's Voice	15 October 1961	1
re	The Shadows	The Shadows	Columbia	22 October 1961	1
24	Cliff Richard & The Shadows	21 Today	Columbia	29 October 1961	1
25	George Mitchell Minstrels	Another Black and White Minstrel Show	His Master's Voice	5 November 1961	8
26	Elvis Presley	Blue Hawaii	RCA	31 December 1961	1
1962
27	Cliff Richard & The Shadows	The Young Ones	Columbia	7 January 1962	6
re	Elvis Presley	Blue Hawaii	RCA	18 February 1962	17
28	Original soundtrack	West Side Story †	Philips	17 June 1962	5
29	Elvis Presley	Pot Luck	RCA	22 July 1962	5
re	Original soundtrack	West Side Story †	Philips	26 August 1962	1
re	Elvis Presley	Pot Luck	RCA	2 September 1962	1
re	Original soundtrack	West Side Story †	Philips	9 September 1962	1
30	Kenny Ball, Chris Barber and Acker Bilk	The Best of Ball, Barber & Bilk	Pye Golden Guinea	16 September 1962	1
re	Original soundtrack	West Side Story †	Philips	23 September 1962	3
re	Kenny Ball, Chris Barber and Acker Bilk	The Best of Ball, Barber & Bilk	Pye Golden Guinea	14 October 1962	1
31	The Shadows	Out of the Shadows	Columbia	21 October 1962	3
re	Original soundtrack	West Side Story †	Philips	11 November 1962	1
re	The Shadows	Out of the Shadows	Columbia	18 November 1962	1
32	George Mitchell Minstrels	On Stage with the George Mitchell Minstrels	His Master's Voice	25 November 1962	2
re	Original soundtrack	West Side Story †	Philips	9 December 1962	1
re	The Shadows	Out of the Shadows	Columbia	16 December 1962	1
re	George Mitchell Minstrels	The Black and White Minstrel Show	His Master's Voice	23 December 1962	2
1963
re	Original soundtrack	West Side Story	Philips	6 January 1963	1
re	The Shadows	Out of the Shadows	Columbia	13 January 1963	2
33	Cliff Richard & The Shadows	Summer Holiday	Columbia	27 January 1963	14
34	The Beatles	Please Please Me	Parlophone	5 May 1963	30
35	The Beatles	With the Beatles †	Parlophone	1 December 1963	21
1964
36	The Rolling Stones	The Rolling Stones	Decca	26 April 1964	12
37	The Beatles	A Hard Day's Night	Parlophone	19 July 1964	21
38	The Beatles	Beatles for Sale †	Parlophone	13 December 1964	7
1965
39	The Rolling Stones	The Rolling Stones No. 2	Decca	31 January 1965	3
re	The Beatles	Beatles for Sale	Parlophone	21 February 1965	1
re	The Rolling Stones	The Rolling Stones No. 2	Decca	28 February 1965	6
40	Bob Dylan	The Freewheelin' Bob Dylan	CBS	11 April 1965	1
re	The Rolling Stones	The Rolling Stones No. 2	Decca	18 April 1965	1
re	The Beatles	Beatles for Sale	Parlophone	25 April 1965	3
re	Bob Dylan	The Freewheelin' Bob Dylan	CBS	16 May 1965	1
41	Bob Dylan	Bringing It All Back Home	CBS	23 May 1965	1
42	Original soundtrack	The Sound of Music †	RCA Victor	30 May 1965	10
43	The Beatles	Help!	Parlophone	8 August 1965	9
re	Original soundtrack	The Sound of Music †	RCA Victor	10 October 1965	10
44	The Beatles	Rubber Soul	Parlophone	19 December 1965	8
1966
re	Original soundtrack	The Sound of Music †	RCA Victor	13 February 1966	10
45	The Rolling Stones	Aftermath	Decca	24 April 1966	8
re	Original soundtrack	The Sound of Music †	RCA Victor	19 June 1966	7
46	The Beatles	Revolver	Parlophone	7 August 1966	7
re	Original soundtrack	The Sound of Music †	RCA Victor	25 September 1966	18
1967
47	The Monkees	The Monkees	RCA Victor	29 January 1967	7
re	Original soundtrack	The Sound of Music	RCA Victor	19 March 1967	7
48	The Monkees	More of The Monkees	RCA Victor	7 May 1967	1
re	Original soundtrack	The Sound of Music	RCA Victor	14 May 1967	1
re	The Monkees	More of The Monkees	RCA Victor	21 May 1967	1
re	Original soundtrack	The Sound of Music	RCA Victor	28 May 1967	1
49	The Beatles	Sgt. Pepper's Lonely Hearts Club Band ‡	Parlophone	4 June 1967	23
re	Original soundtrack	The Sound of Music	RCA Victor	12 November 1967	1
re	The Beatles	Sgt. Pepper's Lonely Hearts Club Band ‡	Parlophone	19 November 1967	1
re	Original soundtrack	The Sound of Music	RCA Victor	26 November 1967	3
re	The Beatles	Sgt. Pepper's Lonely Hearts Club Band ‡	Parlophone	17 December 1967	2
50	Val Doonican	Val Doonican Rocks, But Gently	Pye	31 December 1967	3
1968
re	Original soundtrack	The Sound of Music †	RCA Victor	21 January 1968	1
re	The Beatles	Sgt. Pepper's Lonely Hearts Club Band ‡	Parlophone	28 January 1968	1
51	The Four Tops	The Four Tops Greatest Hits	Tamla Motown	4 February 1968	1
52	Diana Ross & The Supremes	Greatest Hits	Tamla Motown	11 February 1968	3
53	Bob Dylan	John Wesley Harding	CBS	3 March 1968	10
54	Scott Walker	Scott 2	Philips	12 May 1968	1
re	Bob Dylan	John Wesley Harding	CBS	19 May 1968	3
55	Andy Williams	Love, Andy	CBS	9 June 1968	1
56	Otis Redding	The Dock of the Bay	Stax	16 June 1968	1
57	The Small Faces	Ogdens' Nut Gone Flake	Immediate	23 June 1968	6
58	Tom Jones	Delilah	Decca	4 August 1968	1
59	Simon & Garfunkel	Bookends	CBS	11 August 1968	5
re	Tom Jones	Delilah	Decca	15 September 1968	1
re	Simon & Garfunkel	Bookends	CBS	22 September 1968	2
60	The Hollies	Hollies' Greatest	Parlophone	6 October 1968	6
re	Original soundtrack	The Sound of Music †	RCA Victor	17 November 1968	1
re	The Hollies	Hollies' Greatest	Parlophone	24 November 1968	1
61	The Beatles	The Beatles	Apple	1 December 1968	7
1969
62	The Seekers	The Best of The Seekers	Columbia	19 January 1969	1
re	The Beatles	The Beatles	Apple	26 January 1969	1
re	The Seekers	The Best of The Seekers	Columbia	2 February 1969	1
63	Diana Ross & The Supremes	Diana Ross & The Supremes Join The Temptations	Tamla Motown	9 February 1969	4
64	Cream	Goodbye	Polydor	9 March 1969	2
re	The Seekers	The Best of The Seekers	Columbia	23 March 1969	2
re	Cream	Goodbye	Polydor	6 April 1969	1
re	The Seekers	The Best of The Seekers	Columbia	13 April 1969	1
re	Cream	Goodbye	Polydor	20 April 1969	1
re	The Seekers	The Best of The Seekers	Columbia	27 April 1969	1
65	The Moody Blues	On the Threshold of a Dream	Deram	4 May 1969	2
66	Bob Dylan	Nashville Skyline	CBS	18 May 1969	4
67	Ray Conniff	His Orchestra, His Chorus, His Singers, His Sound	CBS	15 June 1969	3
68	Jim Reeves	According to My Heart	RCA International	6 July 1969	4
69	Jethro Tull	Stand Up	Island	3 August 1969	3
70	Elvis Presley	From Elvis in Memphis	RCA Victor	24 August 1969	1
re	Jethro Tull	Stand Up	Island	31 August 1969	2
71	Blind Faith	Blind Faith	Polydor	14 September 1969	2
72	The Beatles	Abbey Road †	Apple	28 September 1969	11
73	The Rolling Stones	Let It Bleed	Decca	14 December 1969	1
re	The Beatles	Abbey Road †	Apple	21 December 1969	6

=== By artist ===
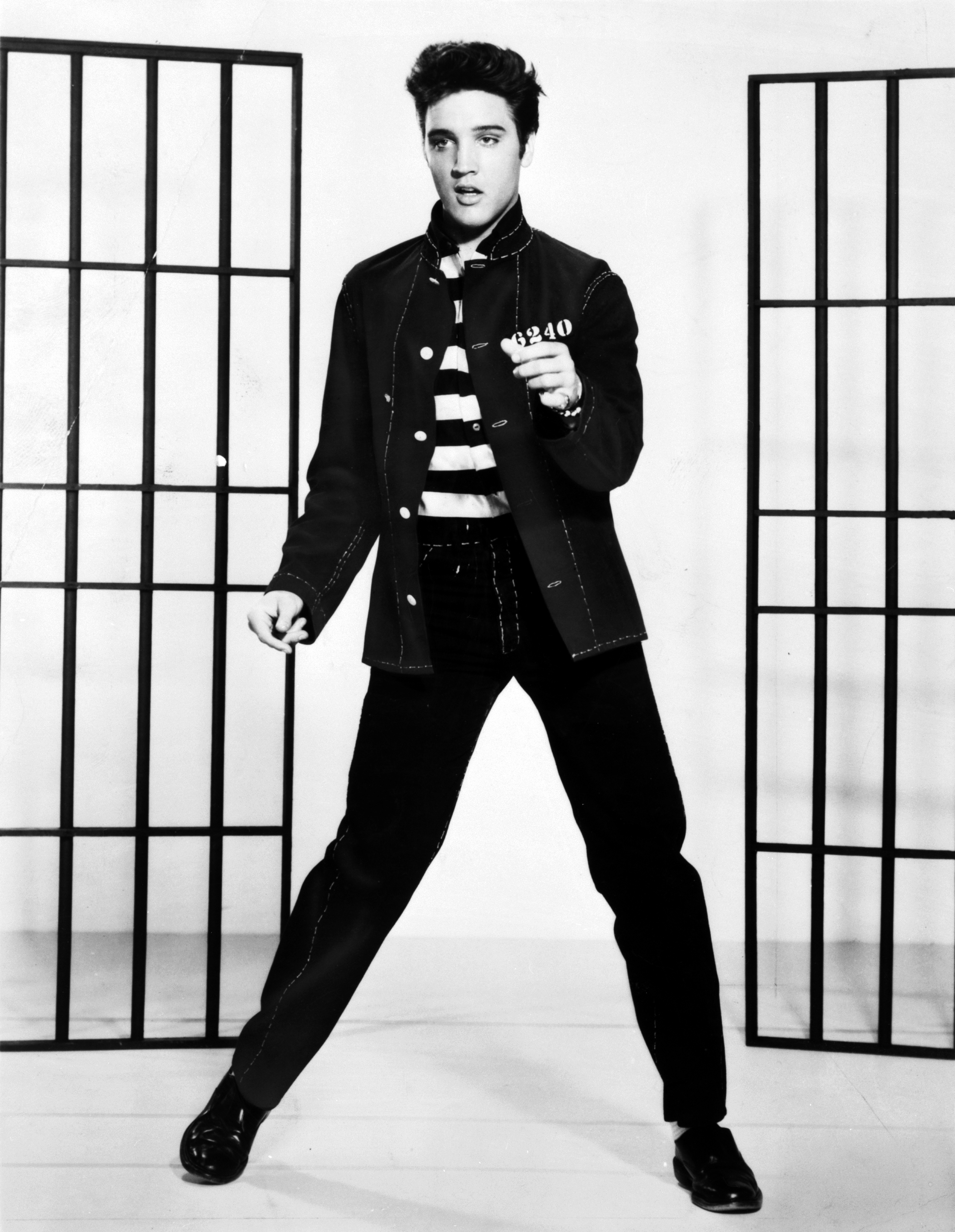
Elvis Presley spent 47 weeks at number one on the albums chart during the 1960s.

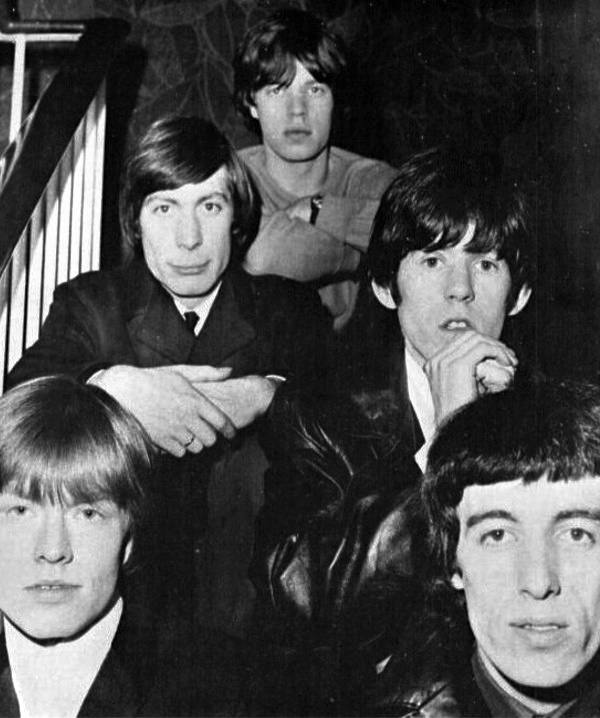
The Rolling Stones topped the UK Albums Chart with four different releases for 31 weeks.

Six artists spent 20 weeks or more at number one on the albums chart during the 1960s.

Artist	Number-one albums	Weeks at number one
The Beatles	10	155
Elvis Presley	5	47
The Shadows (Note: Includes three number-one albums co-credited with Cliff Richard)	5	33
The Rolling Stones	4	31
Cliff Richard (Note: Co-credited with The Shadows)	3	21
Bob Dylan	4	20

=== By record label ===
Eight record labels spent 20 weeks or more at number one on the albums chart during the 1960s.

Record label	Number-one albums	Weeks at number one
Parlophone	9	141
RCA Victor	5	134
RCA Records	4	46
Columbia	6	39
Decca Records	5	33
CBS Records	7	31
Apple Records	2	21
