= List of number-one singles in Australia during the 1960s =

Australian number-one singles of the 1960s < 1950s 1970s >

Australian top 25 singles
- 1960 1961 1962 1963 1964; 1965 1966 1967 1968 1969

Australian top 25 albums
- 1960 1961 1962 1963 1964; 1965 1966 1967 1968 1969

The following lists the number one singles on the Australian Singles Chart during the 1960s.

The source for this decade is the "Kent Music Report". These charts were calculated in the 1990s in retrospect, by David Kent, using archival data.

Key
The yellow background indicates the #1 song on the KMR End of Year Chart
The light blue background indicates the #1 song on the KMR End of Decade Chart

== 1960 ==
Date	Artist	Single	Weeks at number one
2 January	Bill Haley & His Comets	"Joey's Song" / "Ooh! Look-a-There, Ain't She Pretty?"	8 weeks (3 weeks in Dec 1959)
9 January	Bill Haley & His Comets	"Joey's Song" / "Ooh! Look-a-There, Ain't She Pretty?"	8 weeks (3 weeks in Dec 1959)
16 January	Bill Haley & His Comets	"Joey's Song" / "Ooh! Look-a-There, Ain't She Pretty?"	8 weeks (3 weeks in Dec 1959)
23 January	Bill Haley & His Comets	"Joey's Song" / "Ooh! Look-a-There, Ain't She Pretty?"	8 weeks (3 weeks in Dec 1959)
30 January	Bill Haley & His Comets	"Joey's Song" / "Ooh! Look-a-There, Ain't She Pretty?"	8 weeks (3 weeks in Dec 1959)
6 February	Crash Craddock	"Boom Boom Baby"	4 weeks
13 February	Crash Craddock	"Boom Boom Baby"	4 weeks
20 February	Johnny O'Keefe	"She's My Baby"	1 week
27 February	Crash Craddock	"Boom Boom Baby"	4 weeks
5 March	Crash Craddock	"Boom Boom Baby"	4 weeks
12 March	Emile Ford and the Checkmates	"What Do You Want to Make Those Eyes at Me For?"	4 weeks
19 March	Emile Ford and the Checkmates	"What Do You Want to Make Those Eyes at Me For?"	4 weeks
26 March	Emile Ford and the Checkmates	"What Do You Want to Make Those Eyes at Me For?"	4 weeks
2 April	Emile Ford and the Checkmates	"What Do You Want to Make Those Eyes at Me For?"	4 weeks
9 April	Johnny and the Hurricanes	"Beatnik Fly"	2 weeks
16 April	Johnny and the Hurricanes	"Beatnik Fly"	2 weeks
23 April	Jim Reeves	"He'll Have to Go"	4 weeks
30 April	Jim Reeves	"He'll Have to Go"	4 weeks
7 May	Jim Reeves	"He'll Have to Go"	4 weeks
14 May	Jim Reeves	"He'll Have to Go"	4 weeks
21 May	Elvis Presley	"Stuck on You" / "Fame and Fortune"	1 week
28 May	Lonnie Donegan and His Group	"My Old Man's a Dustman"	2 weeks
4 June	Lonnie Donegan and His Group	"My Old Man's a Dustman"	2 weeks
11 June	Rolf Harris	"Tie Me Kangaroo Down, Sport"	3 weeks
18 June	Rolf Harris	"Tie Me Kangaroo Down, Sport"	3 weeks
25 June	Rolf Harris	"Tie Me Kangaroo Down, Sport"	3 weeks
2 July	Bobby Rydell	"Swingin' School" / "Ding-A-Ling"	2 weeks
9 July	Bobby Rydell	"Swingin' School" / "Ding-A-Ling"	2 weeks
16 July	Connie Francis	"Everybody's Somebody's Fool"	3 weeks
23 July	Connie Francis	"Everybody's Somebody's Fool"	3 weeks
30 July	Connie Francis	"Everybody's Somebody's Fool"	3 weeks
6 August	Jimmie Rodgers	"Just a Closer Walk with Thee"	2 weeks
13 August	Jimmie Rodgers	"Just a Closer Walk with Thee"	2 weeks
20 August	The Beau Marks	"Clap Your Hands"	4 weeks
27 August	The Beau Marks	"Clap Your Hands"	4 weeks
3 September	The Beau Marks	"Clap Your Hands"	4 weeks
10 September	The Beau Marks	"Clap Your Hands"	4 weeks
17 September	The Ventures	"Walk, Don't Run"	2 weeks
24 September	The Ventures	"Walk, Don't Run"	2 weeks
1 October	Johnny O'Keefe	"Come on and Take My Hand" / "Don't You Know (Pretty Baby)"	1 week
8 October	Elvis Presley	"It's Now or Never"	7 weeks
15 October	Elvis Presley	"It's Now or Never"	7 weeks
22 October	Elvis Presley	"It's Now or Never"	7 weeks
29 October	Elvis Presley	"It's Now or Never"	7 weeks
5 November	Elvis Presley	"It's Now or Never"	7 weeks
14 November	Elvis Presley	"It's Now or Never"	7 weeks
19 November	Elvis Presley	"It's Now or Never"	7 weeks
26 November	The Drifters	"Save the Last Dance for Me"	4 weeks
3 December	The Drifters	"Save the Last Dance for Me"	4 weeks
10 December	The Drifters	"Save the Last Dance for Me"	4 weeks
17 December	The Drifters	"Save the Last Dance for Me"	4 weeks
24 December	Elvis Presley	"Are You Lonesome Tonight?" / "I Gotta Know"	6 weeks
31 December	Elvis Presley	"Are You Lonesome Tonight?" / "I Gotta Know"	6 weeks

Other hits
Songs peaking at number two included "Running Bear" by Johnny Preston, "If I Had a Girl" by Rod Lauren, "What in the World's Come Over You" by Jack Scott, "Mule Skinner Blues" by The Fendermen, "Itsy Bitsy Teenie Weenie Yellow Polkadot Bikini" by Brian Hyland, "I Found a New Love" / "Defenceless" by Lonnie Lee, "Please Don't Tease" by Cliff Richard and The Shadows, "Peter Gunn" by Duane Eddy and The Rebels, and "North to Alaska" by Johnny Horton.

Other hits (with their peak positions noted) were "Teen Angel" by Mark Dinning (3), "Little Boy Lost" by Johnny Ashcroft (3), "Cathy's Clown" by The Everly Brothers (3), "What a Mouth (What a North and South)" by Tommy Steele (3), "When Will I Be Loved" / "Be-Bop-A-Lula" by The Everly Brothers (3), "Let's Think About Living by Bob Luman (3), "My Heart Has a Mind of Its Own" / "Malaguena" by Connie Francis (3), "In The Mood" by Ernie Fields (4), "Handy Man" by Jimmy Jones (4), "Sink the Bismark" by Johnny Horton (4), "A Kookie Little Paradise" by Jo Ann Campbell (4), "Volare" / "I'd Do it Again" by Bobby Rydell (4), "Yes Sir That's My Baby" by Col Joye & The Joy Boys (5), "Greenfields" by The Brothers Four (5), and "I'm Sorry by Brenda Lee (6).

Hits by Australasian artists included "(Making Love on A) Moonlit Night" by Col Joye, "Turn the Lights Out, Johnny" / "Koala Bear" by Johnny Devlin and The Devils with The Delltones, and "Do You Love Me"/"Whiplash" by Rob E.G.

== 1961 ==
Date	Artist	Single	Weeks at number one
7 January	Elvis Presley	"Are You Lonesome Tonight?" / "I Gotta Know"	6 weeks
14 January	Elvis Presley	"Are You Lonesome Tonight?" / "I Gotta Know"	6 weeks
21 January	Elvis Presley	"Are You Lonesome Tonight?" / "I Gotta Know"	6 weeks
28 January	Elvis Presley	"Are You Lonesome Tonight?" / "I Gotta Know"	6 weeks
4 February	Bert Kaempfert and His Orchestra	"Wonderland by Night"	3 weeks
11 February	Bert Kaempfert and His Orchestra	"Wonderland by Night"	3 weeks
18 February	Bert Kaempfert and His Orchestra	"Wonderland by Night"	3 weeks
25 February	Bobby Vee	"Rubber Ball"	3 weeks
4 March	Bobby Vee	"Rubber Ball"	3 weeks
11 March	Bobby Vee	"Rubber Ball"	3 weeks
18 March	Crash Craddock	"One Last Kiss"	1 week
25 March	Elvis Presley	"Wooden Heart"	4 weeks
1 April	Elvis Presley	"Wooden Heart"	4 weeks
8 April	Elvis Presley	"Wooden Heart"	4 weeks
15 April	Elvis Presley	"Wooden Heart"	4 weeks
22 April	Elvis Presley	"Surrender"	3 weeks
29 April	Elvis Presley	"Surrender"	3 weeks
6 May	Elvis Presley	"Surrender"	3 weeks
13 May	Del Shannon	"Runaway"	6 weeks
20 May	Del Shannon	"Runaway"	6 weeks
27 May	Del Shannon	"Runaway"	6 weeks
3 June	Del Shannon	"Runaway"	6 weeks
10 June	Del Shannon	"Runaway"	6 weeks
17 June	Del Shannon	"Runaway"	6 weeks
24 June	Andy Stewart	"A Scottish Soldier"	1 week
1 July	Ricky Nelson	"Travelin' Man" / "Hello Mary Lou"	5 weeks
8 July	Ricky Nelson	"Travelin' Man" / "Hello Mary Lou"	5 weeks
15 July	Ricky Nelson	"Travelin' Man" / "Hello Mary Lou"	5 weeks
22 July	Ricky Nelson	"Travelin' Man" / "Hello Mary Lou"	5 weeks
29 July	Ricky Nelson	"Travelin' Man" / "Hello Mary Lou"	5 weeks
5 August	Eddie Hodges	"I'm Gonna Knock on Your Door"	7 weeks
12 August	Eddie Hodges	"I'm Gonna Knock on Your Door"	7 weeks
19 August	Eddie Hodges	"I'm Gonna Knock on Your Door"	7 weeks
26 August	Eddie Hodges	"I'm Gonna Knock on Your Door"	7 weeks
2 September	Eddie Hodges	"I'm Gonna Knock on Your Door"	7 weeks
9 September	Eddie Hodges	"I'm Gonna Knock on Your Door"	7 weeks
16 September	Eddie Hodges	"I'm Gonna Knock on Your Door"	7 weeks
23 September	The Highwaymen	"Michael"	1 week
30 September	Johnny O'Keefe	"I'm Counting on You" / "Right Now"	3 weeks
7 October	Johnny O'Keefe	"I'm Counting on You" / "Right Now"	3 weeks
14 October	Johnny O'Keefe	"I'm Counting on You" / "Right Now"	3 weeks
21 October	Bob Moore and His Orchestra	"Mexico"	2 weeks
28 October	Bob Moore and His Orchestra	"Mexico"	2 weeks
4 November	Roy Orbison	"Crying" / "Candy Man"	3 weeks
11 November	Roy Orbison	"Crying" / "Candy Man"	3 weeks
18 November	Roy Orbison	"Crying" / "Candy Man"	3 weeks
25 November	James Darren	"Goodbye, Cruel World"	2 weeks
2 December	James Darren	"Goodbye, Cruel World"	2 weeks
9 December	Charlie Drake	"My Boomerang Won't Come Back"	6 weeks
16 December	Charlie Drake	"My Boomerang Won't Come Back"	6 weeks
23 December	Charlie Drake	"My Boomerang Won't Come Back"	6 weeks
30 December	Charlie Drake	"My Boomerang Won't Come Back"	6 weeks

Other hits
Songs peaking at number two included "Calcutta" by Lawrence Welk, "Wheels" by The String-A-Longs, "Theme From Exodus" by Ferrante & Teicher, "A Hundred Pounds of Clay" by Gene McDaniels, "Hats Off to Larry" by Del Shannon, "Together" by Connie Francis, and "(Marie's the Name) His Latest Flame" / "Little Sister" by Elvis Presley.

Other hits (with their peak positions noted) were "Sway" by Bobby Rydell (3), "Calendar Girl" by Neil Sedaka (3), "Good Time Baby" / Cherié by Bobby Rydell (3), "Little Devil" by Neil Sedaka (3), "Baby Face" and "Take Good Care of My Baby" by Bobby Vee (3), "Hit the Road Jack" by Ray Charles (3), "Corrine, Corrina" by Ray Peterson (4), "Will You Love Me Tomorrow" by The Shirelles (4), "Blue Moon" by The Marcels (4), "Moody River" by Pat Boone (4), "Smoky Mokes" by The Joy Boys (4), "Where the Boys Are" by Connie Francis (5), "Running Scared" / "Love Hurts" by Roy Orbison (5), "You're Sixteen" by Johnny Burnette (6), and "I've Told Every Little Star" by Linda Scott (6).

Hits by Australasian artists included "Ready for You" / "Save the Last Dance for Me" by Johnny O'Keefe, "Six White Boomers" by Rolf Harris, "Got a Zack in the Back of Me Pocket" by Johnny Devlin and The Bricks with The Deeners, and "Goin' Steady" / "Naughty Girls" Col Joye and The Joy Boys.

== 1962 ==
Date	Artist	Single	Weeks at number one
6 January	Charlie Drake	"My Boomerang Won't Come Back"	6 weeks
13 January	Charlie Drake	"My Boomerang Won't Come Back"	6 weeks
20 January	Sandy Nelson	"Let There Be Drums"	1 week
27 January	Elvis Presley	"Can't Help Falling in Love" / "Rock-A-Hula Baby"	5 weeks
3 February	Elvis Presley	"Can't Help Falling in Love" / "Rock-A-Hula Baby"	5 weeks
10 February	Elvis Presley	"Can't Help Falling in Love" / "Rock-A-Hula Baby"	5 weeks
17 February	Elvis Presley	"Can't Help Falling in Love" / "Rock-A-Hula Baby"	5 weeks
24 February	Elvis Presley	"Can't Help Falling in Love" / "Rock-A-Hula Baby"	5 weeks
3 March	Bobby Darin	"Multiplication" / "Irresistible You"	3 weeks
10 March	Bobby Darin	"Multiplication" / "Irresistible You"	3 weeks
17 March	Bobby Darin	"Multiplication" / "Irresistible You"	3 weeks
24 March	Mr Acker Bilk	"Stranger on the Shore"	1 week
31 March	Dion	"The Wanderer"	1 week
7 April	Kenny Ball and His Jazzmen	"Midnight in Moscow"	1 week
14 April	Elvis Presley	"Good Luck Charm" / "Anything That's Part of You"	6 weeks
21 April	Elvis Presley	"Good Luck Charm" / "Anything That's Part of You"	6 weeks
28 April	Elvis Presley	"Good Luck Charm" / "Anything That's Part of You"	6 weeks
5 May	Elvis Presley	"Good Luck Charm" / "Anything That's Part of You"	6 weeks
12 May	Elvis Presley	"Good Luck Charm" / "Anything That's Part of You"	6 weeks
19 May	Elvis Presley	"Good Luck Charm" / "Anything That's Part of You"	6 weeks
26 May	Lucky Starr	"I've Been Everywhere"	2 weeks
2 June	Lucky Starr	"I've Been Everywhere"	2 weeks
9 June	Larry Finnegan	"Dear One"	2 weeks
16 June	Larry Finnegan	"Dear One"	2 weeks
23 June	Ray Charles	"I Can't Stop Loving You"	4 weeks
30 June	Ray Charles	"I Can't Stop Loving You"	4 weeks
7 July	Ray Charles	"I Can't Stop Loving You"	4 weeks
14 July	Ray Charles	"I Can't Stop Loving You"	4 weeks
21 July	Toni Fisher	"West of the Wall"	2 week
28 July	Toni Fisher	"West of the Wall"	2 week
4 August	Claude King	"Wolverton Mountain"	1 week
11 August	Bobby Vinton	"Roses Are Red (My Love)"	4 weeks
18 August	Bobby Vinton	"Roses Are Red (My Love)"	4 weeks
25 August	Bobby Vinton	"Roses Are Red (My Love)"	4 weeks
1 September	Bobby Vinton	"Roses Are Red (My Love)"	4 weeks
8 September	Frank Ifield	"I Remember You"	2 weeks
15 September	Frank Ifield	"I Remember You"	2 weeks
22 September	Tommy Roe	"Sheila"	3 weeks
29 September	Tommy Roe	"Sheila"	3 weeks
6 October	Tommy Roe	"Sheila"	3 weeks
13 October	Nat King Cole	"Ramblin' Rose"	1 week
20 October	Del Shannon	"The Swiss Maid"	3 weeks
27 October	Del Shannon	"The Swiss Maid"	3 weeks
3 November	Del Shannon	"The Swiss Maid"	3 weeks
10 November	Roy Orbison	"Working for the Man" / "Leah"	5 weeks
17 November	Roy Orbison	"Working for the Man" / "Leah"	5 weeks
24 November	Roy Orbison	"Working for the Man" / "Leah"	5 weeks
1 December	Roy Orbison	"Working for the Man" / "Leah"	5 weeks
8 December	Roy Orbison	"Working for the Man" / "Leah"	5 weeks
15 December	The Tijuana Brass featuring Herb Alpert	"The Lonely Bull" / "Acapulco"	3 weeks
22 December	The Tijuana Brass featuring Herb Alpert	"The Lonely Bull" / "Acapulco"	3 weeks
29 December	The Tijuana Brass featuring Herb Alpert	"The Lonely Bull" / "Acapulco"	3 weeks

Other hits
Songs peaking at number two included "Big Bad John" by Jimmy Dean, "When the Girl in Your Arms Is the Girl in Your Heart" by Cliff Richard, "Run to Him" / "Walkin with My Angel" by Bobby Vee, "Chip Chip" by Gene McDaniels, "Dream Baby (How Long Must I Dream)" / "The Actress" by Roy Orbison, "Wonderful Land" / "Stars Fell on Stockton" by The Shadows, "Si Senoe (I Theenk?)" by Rob E.G., "Silver Threads and Golden Needles" by The Springfields, "Alley Cat" by Bent Fabric, "Telstar" by The Tornados, and "The Cha-Cha-Cha" by Bobby Rydell.

Other hits (with their peak positions noted) were "Runaround Sue' by Dion DiMucci (3), "Tower of Strength" by Gene McDaniels (3), "The Twist" by Chubby Checker (3), "A Little Bitty Tear" by Burl Ives (3), "(The Man Who Shot) Liberty Valance" by Gene Pitney (3), "Do You Want To Dance" / "I'm Looking Out the Window" by Cliff Richard (3), 'Happy Birthday Sweet Sixteen" by Neil Sedaka (4), "Have You Ever Been to See Kings Cross" by Frankie Davidson and The Sapphires (4), "She's Not You" / "Just Tell Her Jim Said Hello" by Elvis Presley (5), "Today's Teardrops" by Col Joye and The Joy Boys (5), "Sing!" / "To Love" by Johnny O'Keefe (6), and "The Young Ones" by Cliff Richard and The Shadows (6).

Hits by Australasian artists included "Southern 'Rora" by The Joy Boys, "You're Driving Me Mad" by Judy Stone, and "Get A Little Dirt On Your Hands" by The Delltones

== 1963 ==
Date	Artist	Single	Weeks at number one
5 January	The Four Seasons	"Big Girls Don't Cry" / "Conny-O"	1 week
12 January	Elvis Presley	"Return to Sender"	3 weeks
19 January	Elvis Presley	"Return to Sender"	3 weeks
26 January	Elvis Presley	"Return to Sender"	3 weeks
2 February	The Shadows	"The Boys"	2 weeks
9 February	The Shadows	"The Boys"	2 weeks
16 February	Del Shannon	"Little Town Flirt"	1 week
23 February	The Rooftop Singers	"Walk Right In"	1 week
2 March	Ned Miller	"From a Jack to a King"	2 weeks
9 March	Ned Miller	"From a Jack to a King"	2 weeks
16 March	Paul and Paula	"Hey Paula"	3 weeks
23 March	Paul and Paula	"Hey Paula"	3 weeks
30 March	Paul and Paula	"Hey Paula"	3 weeks
6 April	The Four Seasons	"Walk Like a Man"	1 week
13 April	Roy Orbison	"In Dreams"	2 weeks
20 April	Roy Orbison	"In Dreams"	2 weeks
27 April	The Chantays	"Pipeline"	4 weeks
4 May	The Chantays	"Pipeline"	4 weeks
11 May	The Chantays	"Pipeline"	4 weeks
18 May	The Chantays	"Pipeline"	4 weeks
25 May	Little Peggy March	"I Will Follow Him"	2 weeks
1 June	Little Peggy March	"I Will Follow Him"	2 weeks
8 June	Bill Justis	"Tamoure"	4 weeks
15 June	Bill Justis	"Tamoure"	4 weeks
22 June	Bill Justis	"Tamoure"	4 weeks
29 June	Bill Justis	"Tamoure"	4 weeks
6 July	Lesley Gore	"It's My Party"	1 week
13 July	Kyu Sakamoto	"Sukiyaki"	2 weeks
20 July	Kyu Sakamoto	"Sukiyaki"	2 weeks
27 July	Johnny O'Keefe	"Move Baby Move" / "You'll Never Cherish a Love So True"	2 weeks
3 August	Johnny O'Keefe	"Move Baby Move" / "You'll Never Cherish a Love So True"	2 weeks
10 August	Jan and Dean	"Surf City"	1 week
17 August	Rob E.G.	"55 Days at Peking"	4 weeks
24 August	Rob E.G.	"55 Days at Peking"	4 weeks
31 August	Rob E.G.	"55 Days at Peking"	4 weeks
7 September	Rob E.G.	"55 Days at Peking"	4 weeks
14 September	Allan Sherman	"Hello Muddah, Hello Fadduh"	1 week
21 September	The Atlantics	"Bombora"	2 weeks
28 September	The Atlantics	"Bombora"	2 weeks
5 October	Helen Shapiro	"No Trespassing" / "Not Responsible"	2 weeks
12 October	Helen Shapiro	"No Trespassing" / "Not Responsible"	2 weeks
19 October	Roy Orbison	"Blue Bayou" / "Mean Woman Blues"	2 weeks
26 October	Roy Orbison	"Blue Bayou" / "Mean Woman Blues"	2 weeks
2 November	Kathy Kirby	"Dance On!"	3 weeks
9 November	Kathy Kirby	"Dance On!"	3 weeks
16 November	Kathy Kirby	"Dance On!"	3 weeks
23 November	Jimmy Gilmer and the Fireballs	"Sugar Shack"	3 weeks
30 November	Jimmy Gilmer and the Fireballs	"Sugar Shack"	3 weeks
7 December	Jimmy Gilmer and the Fireballs	"Sugar Shack"	3 weeks
14 December	Gerry & The Pacemakers	"You'll Never Walk Alone"	2 weeks
21 December	Gerry & The Pacemakers	"You'll Never Walk Alone"	2 weeks
28 December	The Beatles	"I Want to Hold Your Hand"	7 weeks

Other hits
Songs peaking at number two included "The Night Has a Thousand Eyes" by Bobby Vee, "Rhythm of the Rain" by The Cascades, "Foot Tapper" by The Shadows, "(You're the) Devil in Disguise" by Elvis Presley, "If I Had a Hammer" by Trini Lopez, "Washington Square" by The Village Stompers, and "Hootenanny Hoot" by Sheb Wooley.

Other hits (with their peak positions noted) were "Blame It on the Bossa Nova" by Eydie Gormé (3), "Summer Holiday" / "Dancing Shoes" by Cliff Richard and The Shadows (3), "How Do You Do It?" by Gerry and the Pacemakers (3), "Falling" / "Distant Drums" by Roy Orbison (3), "Atlantis" by "I Want You to Want Me" by The Shadows (3), "Wipe Out" / "Surfer Joe" by The Surfaris (3), "She Loves You" / "I'll Get You" by The Beatles (3), "Come a Little Bit Closer" by The Delltones (4), "Jezebel" / "Stage to Cimarron" by Rob E.G. (4), "Blue Velvet" by Bobby Vinton (4), "Little Band of Gold" by James Gilreath (5), "María Elena" by Los Indios Tabajaras (5), "Ruby Baby" by Dion DiMucci (6), and "I Like It" by Gerry and the Pacemakers (6).

Hits by Australasian artists included "(And Her Name is) Scarlet" by The De Kroo Brothers, and "Proud of You" by Jay Justin.

== 1964 ==
Date	Artist	Single	Weeks at number one
4 January	The Beatles	"I Want to Hold Your Hand"	7 weeks
11 January	The Beatles	"I Want to Hold Your Hand"	7 weeks
18 January	The Beatles	"I Want to Hold Your Hand"	7 weeks
25 January	The Beatles	"I Want to Hold Your Hand"	7 weeks
1 February	The Beatles	"I Want to Hold Your Hand"	7 weeks
8 February	The Beatles	"I Want to Hold Your Hand"	7 weeks
15 February	The Beatles	"I Saw Her Standing There" / "Love Me Do"	7 weeks
22 February	The Beatles	"I Saw Her Standing There" / "Love Me Do"	7 weeks
29 February	The Beatles	"I Saw Her Standing There" / "Love Me Do"	7 weeks
7 March	The Beatles	"I Saw Her Standing There" / "Love Me Do"	7 weeks
14 March	The Beatles	"I Saw Her Standing There" / "Love Me Do"	7 weeks
21 March	The Beatles	"I Saw Her Standing There" / "Love Me Do"	7 weeks
28 March	The Beatles	"I Saw Her Standing There" / "Love Me Do"	7 weeks
4 April	The Beatles	"Roll Over Beethoven" / "Hold Me Tight"	2 weeks
11 April	The Beatles	"Roll Over Beethoven" / "Hold Me Tight"	2 weeks
18 April	The Beatles	All My Loving EP	3 weeks
25 April	The Beatles	All My Loving EP	3 weeks
2 May	The Beatles	All My Loving EP	3 weeks
9 May	The Beatles	"Can't Buy Me Love" / "You Can't Do That"	5 weeks (and a sixth on 27 June)
16 May	The Beatles	"Can't Buy Me Love" / "You Can't Do That"	5 weeks (and a sixth on 27 June)
23 May	The Beatles	"Can't Buy Me Love" / "You Can't Do That"	5 weeks (and a sixth on 27 June)
30 May	The Beatles	"Can't Buy Me Love" / "You Can't Do That"	5 weeks (and a sixth on 27 June)
6 June	The Beatles	"Can't Buy Me Love" / "You Can't Do That"	5 weeks (and a sixth on 27 June)
13 June	Mary Wells	"My Guy"	2 weeks
20 June	Mary Wells	"My Guy"	2 weeks
27 June	The Beatles	"Can't Buy Me Love" / "You Can't Do That"	1 week (also, 5 weeks starting 9 May)
4 July	The Beatles	Requests (EP): "Long Tall Sally" / "Boys" / "I Call Your Name"	1 week
11 July	Cilla Black	"You're My World"	2 weeks
18 July	Cilla Black	"You're My World"	2 weeks
25 July	The Beatles	"A Hard Day's Night" / "Things We Said Today"	6 weeks
1 August	The Beatles	"A Hard Day's Night" / "Things We Said Today"	6 weeks
8 August	The Beatles	"A Hard Day's Night" / "Things We Said Today"	6 weeks
15 August	The Beatles	"A Hard Day's Night" / "Things We Said Today"	6 weeks
22 August	The Beatles	"A Hard Day's Night" / "Things We Said Today"	6 weeks
29 August	The Beatles	"A Hard Day's Night" / "Things We Said Today"	6 weeks
5 September	The Beatles	"I Should Have Known Better" / "If I Fell"	5 weeks
12 September	The Beatles	"I Should Have Known Better" / "If I Fell"	5 weeks
19 September	The Beatles	"I Should Have Known Better" / "If I Fell"	5 weeks
26 September	The Beatles	"I Should Have Known Better" / "If I Fell"	5 weeks
3 October	The Beatles	"I Should Have Known Better" / "If I Fell"	5 weeks
10 October	Roy Orbison	"Pretty Woman"	2 weeks
17 October	Roy Orbison	"Pretty Woman"	2 weeks
24 October	The Honeycombs	"Have I the Right?"	2 weeks
31 October	The Honeycombs	"Have I the Right?"	2 weeks
7 November	Ray Columbus and the Invaders	"She's a Mod"	2 weeks
14 November	Ray Columbus and the Invaders	"She's a Mod"	2 weeks
21 November	Elvis Presley	"Ain't That Loving You, Baby" / "Ask Me"	3 weeks
28 November	Elvis Presley	"Ain't That Loving You, Baby" / "Ask Me"	3 weeks
5 December	Elvis Presley	"Ain't That Loving You, Baby" / "Ask Me"	3 weeks
12 December	The Beatles	"I Feel Fine" / "She's a Woman"	8 weeks
19 December	The Beatles	"I Feel Fine" / "She's a Woman"	8 weeks
26 December	The Beatles	"I Feel Fine" / "She's a Woman"	8 weeks

Other hits
Songs peaking at number two included "Secret Love" by Kathy Kirby, "A World Without Love" by Peter & Gordon, "My Boy Lollipop" by Millie, "Wishin' and Hopin'" by Dusty Springfield, "The House of the Rising Sun" by The Animals, "Do Wah Diddy Diddy" by Manfred Mann, "William Tell Overture" by Sounds Incorporated, and "When You Walk in the Room" by The Searchers.

Other hits (with their peak positions noted) were "Dominique" by The Singing Nun (3), "Twenty Four Hours from Tulsa" by Gene Pitney (3), "Don't Talk to Him' by Cliff Richard (3), "Glad All Over" by The Dave Clark Five (3), "Diane" by The Bachelors (3), "Suspicion" by Terry Stafford (3), "Poison Ivy" / Broken Things" by Billy Thorpe and the Aztecs (3), "Rag Doll" by The Four Seasons (3), "Such a Night" by Elvis Presley (3), "You Don't Own Me" by Lesley Gore (4), "Needles and Pins" by The Searchers (4), "Bits and Pieces" / "All of the Time" by The Dave Clark Five (4), "Viva Las Vegas" / "What'd I Say" by Elvis Presley (4), Twist and Shout EP by The Beatles (5), "Hangin' Five" by The Delltones (5), "Hello, Dolly!" by Louis Armstrong (5), and "It Hurts to Be in Love" by Gene Pitney (6).

Hits by Australasian artists included "The Crusher" by The Atlantics, "When You're Not to Wear" by Rob E.G., "She Wears My Ring" / "Let's Love Tonight" by Johnny O'Keefe, "Mashed Potato" / "Don't Cha Know" by Billy Thorpe and the Aztecs, and "4,003,221 Tears From Now" by Judy Stone.

== 1965 ==
Date	Artist	Single	Weeks at number one
2 January	The Beatles	"I Feel Fine" / "She's a Woman"	8 weeks
9 January	The Beatles	"I Feel Fine" / "She's a Woman"	8 weeks
16 January	The Beatles	"I Feel Fine" / "She's a Woman"	8 weeks
23 January	The Beatles	"I Feel Fine" / "She's a Woman"	8 weeks
30 January	The Beatles	"I Feel Fine" / "She's a Woman"	8 weeks
6 February	Julie Rogers	"The Wedding"	1 week
13 February	Petula Clark	"Downtown"	1 week
20 February	The Rolling Stones	"Under the Boardwalk" / "Walking the Dog"	3 weeks
27 February	The Rolling Stones	"Under the Boardwalk" / "Walking the Dog"	3 weeks
6 March	The Rolling Stones	"Under the Boardwalk" / "Walking the Dog"	3 weeks
13 March	The Seekers	"I'll Never Find Another You"	3 weeks
20 March	The Seekers	"I'll Never Find Another You"	3 weeks
27 March	The Seekers	"I'll Never Find Another You"	3 weeks
3 April	The Beatles	"Rock and Roll Music" / "Honey Don't"	4 weeks
10 April	The Beatles	"Rock and Roll Music" / "Honey Don't"	4 weeks
17 April	The Beatles	"Rock and Roll Music" / "Honey Don't"	4 weeks
24 April	The Beatles	"Rock and Roll Music" / "Honey Don't"	4 weeks
1 May	The Beatles	"Ticket to Ride" / "Yes It Is"	3 weeks
8 May	The Beatles	"Ticket to Ride" / "Yes It Is"	3 weeks
15 May	The Beatles	"Ticket to Ride" / "Yes It Is"	3 weeks
22 May	Herman's Hermits	"Mrs. Brown, You've Got a Lovely Daughter"	4 weeks
29 May	Herman's Hermits	"Mrs. Brown, You've Got a Lovely Daughter"	4 weeks
5 June	Herman's Hermits	"Mrs. Brown, You've Got a Lovely Daughter"	4 weeks
12 June	Herman's Hermits	"Mrs. Brown, You've Got a Lovely Daughter"	4 weeks
19 June	Elvis Presley	"Crying in the Chapel"	6 weeks
26 June	Elvis Presley	"Crying in the Chapel"	6 weeks
3 July	Elvis Presley	"Crying in the Chapel"	6 weeks
10 July	Elvis Presley	"Crying in the Chapel"	6 weeks
17 July	Elvis Presley	"Crying in the Chapel"	6 weeks
24 July	Elvis Presley	"Crying in the Chapel"	6 weeks
31 July	Billy Thorpe and the Aztecs	"I Told the Brook" / "Funny Face"	1 week
7 August	The Rolling Stones	"(I Can't Get No) Satisfaction"	1 week
14 August	The Beatles	"Help!" / "I'm Down"	8 weeks
21 August	The Beatles	"Help!" / "I'm Down"	8 weeks
28 August	The Beatles	"Help!" / "I'm Down"	8 weeks
4 September	The Beatles	"Help!" / "I'm Down"	8 weeks
11 September	The Beatles	"Help!" / "I'm Down"	8 weeks
18 September	The Beatles	"Help!" / "I'm Down"	8 weeks
25 September	The Beatles	"Help!" / "I'm Down"	8 weeks
2 October	The Beatles	"Help!" / "I'm Down"	8 weeks
9 October	Normie Rowe	"Que Sera, Sera (Whatever Will Be, Will Be)" / "Shakin' All Over"	8 weeks
16 October	Normie Rowe	"Que Sera, Sera (Whatever Will Be, Will Be)" / "Shakin' All Over"	8 weeks
23 October	Normie Rowe	"Que Sera, Sera (Whatever Will Be, Will Be)" / "Shakin' All Over"	8 weeks
30 October	Normie Rowe	"Que Sera, Sera (Whatever Will Be, Will Be)" / "Shakin' All Over"	8 weeks
6 November	Normie Rowe	"Que Sera, Sera (Whatever Will Be, Will Be)" / "Shakin' All Over"	8 weeks
13 November	Normie Rowe	"Que Sera, Sera (Whatever Will Be, Will Be)" / "Shakin' All Over"	8 weeks
20 November	Normie Rowe	"Que Sera, Sera (Whatever Will Be, Will Be)" / "Shakin' All Over"	8 weeks
27 November	Normie Rowe	"Que Sera, Sera (Whatever Will Be, Will Be)" / "Shakin' All Over"	8 weeks
4 December	The Seekers	"The Carnival Is Over"	6 weeks
11 December	The Seekers	"The Carnival Is Over"	6 weeks
18 December	The Seekers	"The Carnival Is Over"	6 weeks
25 December	The Seekers	"The Carnival Is Over"	6 weeks

Other hits
Songs peaking at number two included "Little Red Rooster", "The Last Time" / "Play With Fire", and "Get Off of My Cloud" by The Rolling Stones, "Over the Rainbow" / "That I Love", and "Twilight Time" / "My Girl Josephine" by Billy Thorpe and the Aztecs, "Ferry Cross the Mersey" by Gerry and the Pacemakers, "A World of Our Own" by The Seekers, "Mission Bell" by P. J. Proby, "Il Slienzio" by Nini Rosso, "Eve of Destruction" by Barry McGuire, "What's New Pussycat?" by Tom Jones, "Sing C'est La Vie" by Sonny & Cher, and "Yesterday" / "Act Naturally" by The Beatles.

Other hits (with their peak positions noted) were "Leader of the Pack" by The Shangri-Las (3), "Do What You Do Do Well" by Ned Miller (3), "It's Not Unusual" by Tom Jones (3), "Can't You Hear My Heartbeat" / "Silhouettes" by Herman's Hermits (3), "Paper Tiger" by Sue Thompson (3), "Mr. Tambourine Man" by The Byrds (3), "She's So Fine" / "The Old Oak Tree" by The Easybeats (3), "Fool, Fool, Fool" by Ray Brown & the Whispers (3), "Unchained Melody" by The Righteous Brothers (3), "I Got You Babe" by Sonny & Cher (3), "Tell Him I'm Not Home" / "Call on Me" by Normie Rowe (3), "Ringo" by Lorne Greene (4), "Goldfinger" by Shirley Bassey (4), "The Hucklebuck" by Brendan Bowyer (4), "If You Gotta Go, Go Now" by Manfred Mann (4), "You've Lost That Lovin' Feelin'" by The Righteous Brothers (5), "Heart of Stone" / "Heart of Stone" by The Rolling Stones (5), "It Ain't Necessarily So" by Normie Rowe (5), "Walk Away (Warum Nur Warum)" by Matt Monro (6), "Goodbye" by Roy Orbison (6), and "Like a Rolling Stone" by Bob Dylan (7).

Hits by Australasian artists included "Velvet Waters" by Tony Worsley, "Wedding Ring" by The Easybeats, "Morning Town Ride" by The Seekers, and "Rockin' Robin" / "Baby What's Wrong" by The Henchmen.

== 1966 ==
Date	Artist	Single	Weeks at number one
1 January	The Seekers	"The Carnival Is Over"	6 weeks
8 January	The Seekers	"The Carnival Is Over"	6 weeks
15 January	The Beatles	"We Can Work It Out" / "Day Tripper"	7 weeks
22 January	The Beatles	"We Can Work It Out" / "Day Tripper"	7 weeks
29 January	The Beatles	"We Can Work It Out" / "Day Tripper"	7 weeks
5 February	The Beatles	"We Can Work It Out" / "Day Tripper"	7 weeks
12 February	The Beatles	"We Can Work It Out" / "Day Tripper"	7 weeks
19 February	The Beatles	"We Can Work It Out" / "Day Tripper"	7 weeks
26 February	The Beatles	"We Can Work It Out" / "Day Tripper"	7 weeks
5 March	Nancy Sinatra	"These Boots Are Made for Walkin'"	8 weeks
12 March	Nancy Sinatra	"These Boots Are Made for Walkin'"	8 weeks
19 March	Nancy Sinatra	"These Boots Are Made for Walkin'"	8 weeks
26 March	Nancy Sinatra	"These Boots Are Made for Walkin'"	8 weeks
2 April	Nancy Sinatra	"These Boots Are Made for Walkin'"	8 weeks
9 April	Nancy Sinatra	"These Boots Are Made for Walkin'"	8 weeks
16 April	Nancy Sinatra	"These Boots Are Made for Walkin'"	8 weeks
23 April	Nancy Sinatra	"These Boots Are Made for Walkin'"	8 weeks
30 April	The Beatles	"Nowhere Man" / "Norwegian Wood (This Bird Has Flown)"	2 weeks
7 May	The Beatles	"Nowhere Man" / "Norwegian Wood (This Bird Has Flown)"	2 weeks
14 May	Bobby and Laurie	"Hitch Hiker"	5 weeks
21 May	Bobby and Laurie	"Hitch Hiker"	5 weeks
28 May	Bobby and Laurie	"Hitch Hiker"	5 weeks
4 June	Bobby and Laurie	"Hitch Hiker"	5 weeks
11 June	Bobby and Laurie	"Hitch Hiker"	5 weeks
18 June	The Rolling Stones	"Paint It, Black" / "Long Long While"	3 weeks
25 June	The Rolling Stones	"Paint It, Black" / "Long Long While"	3 weeks
2 July	The Rolling Stones	"Paint It, Black" / "Long Long While"	3 weeks
9 July	The Beatles	"Paperback Writer" / "Rain"	1 week
16 July	Frank Sinatra	"Strangers in the Night"	2 weeks
23 July	Frank Sinatra	"Strangers in the Night"	2 weeks
30 July	The Troggs	"Wild Thing"	2 weeks
6 August	The Troggs	"Wild Thing"	2 weeks
13 August	B. J. Thomas	"Mama"	1 week
20 August	The Easybeats	Easyfever (EP): "I'll Make You Happy" / "Too Much"	2 weeks
27 August	The Easybeats	Easyfever (EP): "I'll Make You Happy" / "Too Much"	2 weeks
3 September	The Beatles	"Yellow Submarine" / "Eleanor Rigby"	8 weeks
10 September	The Beatles	"Yellow Submarine" / "Eleanor Rigby"	8 weeks
17 September	The Beatles	"Yellow Submarine" / "Eleanor Rigby"	8 weeks
24 September	The Beatles	"Yellow Submarine" / "Eleanor Rigby"	8 weeks
1 October	The Beatles	"Yellow Submarine" / "Eleanor Rigby"	8 weeks
8 October	The Beatles	"Yellow Submarine" / "Eleanor Rigby"	8 weeks
15 October	The Beatles	"Yellow Submarine" / "Eleanor Rigby"	8 weeks
22 October	The Beatles	"Yellow Submarine" / "Eleanor Rigby"	8 weeks
29 October	Peter and Gordon	"Lady Godiva"	3 weeks
5 November	Peter and Gordon	"Lady Godiva"	3 weeks
12 November	Peter and Gordon	"Lady Godiva"	3 weeks
19 November	New Vaudeville Band	"Winchester Cathedral"	1 week
26 November	The Easybeats	"Sorry" / "Funny Feelin'"	1 week
3 December	Herman's Hermits	"No Milk Today"	1 week
10 December	The Beach Boys	"Good Vibrations"	1 week
17 December	Normie Rowe	"Ooh La La" / "Ain't Nobody Home"	1 week (and another two weeks in 1967)
24 December	The Easybeats	"Friday on My Mind"	2 weeks
31 December	The Easybeats	"Friday on My Mind"	2 weeks

Other hits
Songs peaking at number two included "My Generation" by The Who, "Barbara Ann" by The Beach Boys, "As Tears Go By" / "19th Nervous Breakdown" by The Rolling Stones, "Michelle" by The Overlanders, "Elusive Butterfly" by Bob Lind, "You Don't Have to Say You Love Me" by Dusty Springfield, "Tar and Cement" by Verdelle Smith, "Bus Stop" by The Hollies, "Somewhere, My Love" (Theme from Doctor Zhivago) by The Ray Coniff Signers, "Step Back" / "Cara-Lyn" by Johnny Young and Kompany, and "Needle in a Haystack" / "I Won't Be the Same Without Her" by The Twilights.

Other hits (with their peak positions noted) were "Love Letter" / " Dancing in the Street" by Billy Thorpe and the Aztecs (3), "The Sound of Silence" by Simon & Garfunkel (3), "Listen People" by Herman's Hermits (3), "Come and See Her" / "I Can See" by The Easybeats (3), "Pretty Flamingo" by Manfred Mann (3), "Born a Woman" by Judy Stone (3), "Black Is Black" by Los Bravos (3), "Women (Make You Feel Alright)" / "In My Book" by The Easybeats (4), "A Must to Avoid" by Herman's Hermits (4), "Tennessee Waltz Song" / "I Am What I Am" by Ray Brown & the Whispers (4), "Someday, One Day" by The Seekers (4), "Monday, Monday" by The Mamas & the Papas (4), "Sunshine Superman" by Donovan (4), "They're Coming to Take Me Away, Ha-Haaa!" by Napoleon XIV (4), "I'm a Man" by The Yardbirds (5), "The Pied Piper" by Crispian St. Peters (5), "Second Hand Rose" by Barbra Streisand (6), "Li'l Red Riding Hood" by Sam the Sham and The Phorahs (6), and "You Can't Hurry Love" by The Supremes (6).

Hits by Australasian artists included "Pride and Joy" / "The Stones I Throw" by Normie Rowe and The Playboys, "Ever Lovin' Man" and "The Loved One" by The Loved Ones, "Someday" by Tony Barber, and "Let the Little Girl Dance" / "Answer Me" by Grantley Dee.

== 1967 ==
Date	Artist	Single	Weeks at number one
7 January	Normie Rowe	"Ooh La La" / "Ain't Nobody Home"	2 weeks (also one week in 1966)
14 January	Normie Rowe	"Ooh La La" / "Ain't Nobody Home"	2 weeks (also one week in 1966)
21 January	Tom Jones	"Green, Green Grass of Home"	3 weeks
28 January	Tom Jones	"Green, Green Grass of Home"	3 weeks
4 February	Tom Jones	"Green, Green Grass of Home"	3 weeks
11 February	The Monkees	"I'm a Believer" / "(I'm Not Your) Steppin' Stone"	1 week
18 February	The Royal Guardsmen	"Snoopy vs. the Red Baron"	5 weeks
25 February	The Royal Guardsmen	"Snoopy vs. the Red Baron"	5 weeks
4 March	The Royal Guardsmen	"Snoopy vs. the Red Baron"	5 weeks
11 March	The Royal Guardsmen	"Snoopy vs. the Red Baron"	5 weeks
18 March	The Royal Guardsmen	"Snoopy vs. the Red Baron"	5 weeks
25 March	The Seekers	"Georgy Girl"	1 week
1 April	The Beatles	"Penny Lane" / "Strawberry Fields Forever"	5 weeks
8 April	The Beatles	"Penny Lane" / "Strawberry Fields Forever"	5 weeks
15 April	The Beatles	"Penny Lane" / "Strawberry Fields Forever"	5 weeks
22 April	The Beatles	"Penny Lane" / "Strawberry Fields Forever"	5 weeks
29 April	The Beatles	"Penny Lane" / "Strawberry Fields Forever"	5 weeks
6 May	Nancy Sinatra and Frank Sinatra	"Somethin' Stupid"	3 weeks
13 May	Nancy Sinatra and Frank Sinatra	"Somethin' Stupid"	3 weeks
20 May	Nancy Sinatra and Frank Sinatra	"Somethin' Stupid"	3 weeks
27 May	Petula Clark	"This Is My Song"	6 weeks
3 June	Petula Clark	"This Is My Song"	6 weeks
10 June	Petula Clark	"This Is My Song"	6 weeks
17 June	Petula Clark	"This Is My Song"	6 weeks
24 June	Petula Clark	"This Is My Song"	6 weeks
1 July	Petula Clark	"This Is My Song"	6 weeks
8 July	Procol Harum	"A Whiter Shade of Pale"	3 weeks
15 July	Procol Harum	"A Whiter Shade of Pale"	3 weeks
22 July	Procol Harum	"A Whiter Shade of Pale"	3 weeks
29 July	The Beatles	"All You Need Is Love" / "Baby, You're a Rich Man"	5 weeks
5 August	The Beatles	"All You Need Is Love" / "Baby, You're a Rich Man"	5 weeks
12 August	The Beatles	"All You Need Is Love" / "Baby, You're a Rich Man"	5 weeks
19 August	The Beatles	"All You Need Is Love" / "Baby, You're a Rich Man"	5 weeks
26 August	The Beatles	"All You Need Is Love" / "Baby, You're a Rich Man"	5 weeks
2 September	The 5th Dimension	"Up, Up and Away"	2 weeks
9 September	The 5th Dimension	"Up, Up and Away"	2 weeks
16 September	Petula Clark	"Don't Sleep in the Subway"	2 weeks
23 September	Petula Clark	"Don't Sleep in the Subway"	2 weeks
30 September	Vikki Carr	"It Must Be Him"	3 weeks
7 October	Vikki Carr	"It Must Be Him"	3 weeks
14 October	Vikki Carr	"It Must Be Him"	3 weeks
21 October	Engelbert Humperdinck	"The Last Waltz"	9 weeks
28 October	Engelbert Humperdinck	"The Last Waltz"	9 weeks
4 November	Engelbert Humperdinck	"The Last Waltz"	9 weeks
11 November	Engelbert Humperdinck	"The Last Waltz"	9 weeks
18 November	Engelbert Humperdinck	"The Last Waltz"	9 weeks
25 November	Engelbert Humperdinck	"The Last Waltz"	9 weeks
2 December	Engelbert Humperdinck	"The Last Waltz"	9 weeks
9 December	Engelbert Humperdinck	"The Last Waltz"	9 weeks
16 December	Engelbert Humperdinck	"The Last Waltz"	9 weeks
23 December	The Royal Guardsmen	"Snoopy's Christmas"	2 weeks
30 December	The Royal Guardsmen	"Snoopy's Christmas"	2 weeks

Other hits
Songs peaking at number two included "When I Was Young" by Eric Burdon and The Animals, "Puppet on a String" by Sandie Shaw, "San Francisco (Be Sure to Wear Flowers in Your Hair)" by Scott McKenzie, "Itchycoo Park" by Small Faces, and "Massachusetts" by Bee Gees.

Other hits (with their peak positions noted) were "The Happening" by The Supremes (3), "It's Not Easy" by Normie Rowe (3), "Let's Spend The Night Together" / "Ruby Tuesday" by The Rolling Stones (3), "Release Me" by Engelbert Humperdinck (3), "Dedicated to the One I Love" by The Mamas & the Papas (3), "Groovin'" by The Young Rascals (3), The Monkees Volume 1 EP by The Monkees (3), "The Two of Us" by Jackie Trent and Tony Hatch (3), "When Will I Be Loved?" / "Kiss Me Now" by Johnny Young and Kompany (4), "Happy Jack" by The Who (4), "A Little Bit Me, a Little Bit You" / "The Girl I Knew Somewhere" by The Monkees (4), "Waterloo Sunset" by The Kinks (4), "In the Chapel in the Moonlight" by Dean Martin (4), "The Letter" by The Box Tops (4), "Pamela Pamela" by Wayne Fontana (5), "There's a Kind of Hush" by Herman's Hermits (5), "Silence Is Golden" by The Tremeloes (5), "Lightning's Girl" by Nancy Sinatra (5), "Gimme Some Lovin'" by The Spencer Davis Group (6), and "To Love Somebody" by Bee Gees (6).

Hits by Australasian artists included "Living in a Child's Dream" by The Masters Apprentices, "What's Wrong with the Way I Live" / "9.50" by The Twilights, "Woman You're Breaking Me" by The Groop, "Heaven and Hell" / "Pretty Girl" by The Easybeats, and "What Am I Doing Here With You?" by Bev Harrell.

== 1968 ==
Date	Artist	Single	Weeks at number one
6 January	The Beatles	"Hello, Goodbye" / "I Am the Walrus"	2 weeks
13 January	The Beatles	"Hello, Goodbye" / "I Am the Walrus"	2 weeks
20 January	John Farnham	"Sadie (The Cleaning Lady)"	6 weeks
27 January	John Farnham	"Sadie (The Cleaning Lady)"	6 weeks
3 February	John Farnham	"Sadie (The Cleaning Lady)"	6 weeks
10 February	John Farnham	"Sadie (The Cleaning Lady)"	6 weeks
17 February	John Farnham	"Sadie (The Cleaning Lady)"	6 weeks
24 February	John Farnham	"Sadie (The Cleaning Lady)"	6 weeks
2 March	John Fred and His Playboy Band	"Judy in Disguise"	2 weeks
9 March	John Fred and His Playboy Band	"Judy in Disguise"	2 weeks
16 March	Paul Mauriat and His Orchestra	"Love Is Blue"	5 weeks
23 March	Paul Mauriat and His Orchestra	"Love Is Blue"	5 weeks
30 March	Paul Mauriat and His Orchestra	"Love Is Blue"	5 weeks
6 April	Paul Mauriat and His Orchestra	"Love Is Blue"	5 weeks
13 April	Paul Mauriat and His Orchestra	"Love Is Blue"	5 weeks
20 April	The Beatles	"Lady Madonna" / "The Inner Light"	2 weeks
27 April	The Beatles	"Lady Madonna" / "The Inner Light"	2 weeks
4 May	Bobby Goldsboro	"Honey"	5 weeks
11 May	Bobby Goldsboro	"Honey"	5 weeks
18 May	Bobby Goldsboro	"Honey"	5 weeks
25 May	Bobby Goldsboro	"Honey"	5 weeks
1 June	Bobby Goldsboro	"Honey"	5 weeks
8 June	The Irish Rovers	"The Unicorn"	4 weeks
15 June	The Irish Rovers	"The Unicorn"	4 weeks
22 June	The Irish Rovers	"The Unicorn"	4 weeks
29 June	The Irish Rovers	"The Unicorn"	4 weeks
6 July	Herb Alpert & the Tijuana Brass	"This Guy's in Love with You"	2 weeks
13 July	Herb Alpert & the Tijuana Brass	"This Guy's in Love with You"	2 weeks
20 July	Merrilee Rush	"Angel of the Morning"	2 weeks
27 July	Merrilee Rush	"Angel of the Morning"	2 weeks
3 August	The Irish Rovers	"The Orange and the Green" / "Whiskey on a Sunday"	3 weeks
10 August	The Irish Rovers	"The Orange and the Green" / "Whiskey on a Sunday"	3 weeks
17 August	The Irish Rovers	"The Orange and the Green" / "Whiskey on a Sunday"	3 weeks
24 August	Richard Harris	"MacArthur Park"	2 weeks
31 August	Richard Harris	"MacArthur Park"	2 weeks
7 September	Mama Cass with The Mamas & the Papas	"Dream a Little Dream of Me"	1 week
14 September	Tom Jones	"Help Yourself"	2 weeks
21 September	Tom Jones	"Help Yourself"	2 weeks
28 September	Jeannie C. Riley	"Harper Valley PTA"	1 week
5 October	The Beatles	"Hey Jude" / "Revolution"	13 weeks
12 October	The Beatles	"Hey Jude" / "Revolution"	13 weeks
19 October	The Beatles	"Hey Jude" / "Revolution"	13 weeks
26 October	The Beatles	"Hey Jude" / "Revolution"	13 weeks
2 November	The Beatles	"Hey Jude" / "Revolution"	13 weeks
9 November	The Beatles	"Hey Jude" / "Revolution"	13 weeks
16 November	The Beatles	"Hey Jude" / "Revolution"	13 weeks
23 November	The Beatles	"Hey Jude" / "Revolution"	13 weeks
30 November	The Beatles	"Hey Jude" / "Revolution"	13 weeks
7 December	The Beatles	"Hey Jude" / "Revolution"	13 weeks
14 December	The Beatles	"Hey Jude" / "Revolution"	13 weeks
21 December	The Beatles	"Hey Jude" / "Revolution"	13 weeks
28 December	The Beatles	"Hey Jude" / "Revolution"	13 weeks

Other hits
Songs peaking at number two included "Daydream Believer" / "Goin' Down" by The Monkees, "Green Tambourine" by The Lemon Pipers, "Simon Says" by 1910 Fruitgum Company, "Delilah" by Tom Jones, "Young Girl" by Gary Puckett & The Union Gap, "Jumpin' Jack Flash" by The Rolling Stones, "Do It Again" by The Beach Boys, "Those Were The Days" by Mary Hopkin, and "Little Arrows" by Leapy Lee.

Other hits (with their peak positions noted) were "Tin Soldier" by Small Faces (3), "Bottle of Wine" by The Fireballs (3), Magical Mystery Tour (EP) by The Beatles (3), "The Good, the Bad and the Ugly" by Hugo Montenegro (3), "The Son of Hickory Holler's Tramp" by O.C. Smith (3), "Indian Lake" by The Cowsills (3), "I've Gotta Get a Message to You" / "Kitty Can" by Bee Gees (3), "The Ballad of Bonnie and Clyde" by Georgie Fame (4), "Gimme Little Sign" by Brenton Wood (4), "Hold Me Tight" by Johnny Nash (4), "Congratulations" by Cliff Richard (5), "Hurdy Gurdy Man" by Donovan (5), "Lazy Sunday" by Small Faces (5), "Woman, Woman" by Gary Puckett & The Union Gap (6), "The Legend of Xanadu" by Dave Dee, Dozy, Beaky, Mick & Tich (6), and "Underneath the Arches" / "I Don't Want to Love You" by John Farnham (6).

Hits by Australasian artists included "If I Only Had Time" by John Rowles, "Cathy Come Home" / "The Way They Play" by The Twilights, "My Prayer" by The Vibrants, "Soothe Me" by The Groove, and "Words" / "Sinking Ships" by The Bee Gees.

== 1969 ==
Date	Artist	Single	Weeks at number one
4 January	Cream	"White Room" / "Those Were the Days"	2 weeks
11 January	Cream	"White Room" / "Those Were the Days"	2 weeks
18 January	Barry Ryan	"Eloise"	3 weeks
24 January	Barry Ryan	"Eloise"	3 weeks
1 February	Barry Ryan	"Eloise"	3 weeks
8 February	The Scaffold	"Lily the Pink"	2 weeks
15 February	The Scaffold	"Lily the Pink"	2 weeks
22 February	Bee Gees	"I Started a Joke"	2 weeks
1 March	Bee Gees	"I Started a Joke"	2 weeks
8 March	The Beatles	"Ob-La-Di, Ob-La-Da" / "While My Guitar Gently Weeps"	6 weeks
15 March	The Beatles	"Ob-La-Di, Ob-La-Da" / "While My Guitar Gently Weeps"	6 weeks
22 March	The Beatles	"Ob-La-Di, Ob-La-Da" / "While My Guitar Gently Weeps"	6 weeks
29 March	The Beatles	"Ob-La-Di, Ob-La-Da" / "While My Guitar Gently Weeps"	6 weeks
5 April	The Beatles	"Ob-La-Di, Ob-La-Da" / "While My Guitar Gently Weeps"	6 weeks
12 April	The Beatles	"Ob-La-Di, Ob-La-Da" / "While My Guitar Gently Weeps"	6 weeks
19 April	Peter Sarstedt	"Where Do You Go To (My Lovely)"	4 weeks
26 April	Peter Sarstedt	"Where Do You Go To (My Lovely)"	4 weeks
3 May	Peter Sarstedt	"Where Do You Go To (My Lovely)"	4 weeks
10 May	Peter Sarstedt	"Where Do You Go To (My Lovely)"	4 weeks
17 May	Russell Morris	"The Real Thing"	2 weeks
24 May	Russell Morris	"The Real Thing"	2 weeks
31 May	The Beatles	"Get Back" / "Don't Let Me Down"	4 weeks
7 June	The Beatles	"Get Back" / "Don't Let Me Down"	4 weeks
14 June	The Beatles	"Get Back" / "Don't Let Me Down"	4 weeks
21 June	The Beatles	"Get Back" / "Don't Let Me Down"	4 weeks
28 June	The Cowsills	"Hair"	2 weeks
5 July	The Cowsills	"Hair"	2 weeks
12 July	The Beatles	"The Ballad of John and Yoko"	4 weeks
19 July	The Beatles	"The Ballad of John and Yoko"	4 weeks
26 July	The Beatles	"The Ballad of John and Yoko"	4 weeks
2 August	The Beatles	"The Ballad of John and Yoko"	4 weeks
9 August	Elvis Presley	"In the Ghetto"	4 weeks
16 August	Elvis Presley	"In the Ghetto"	4 weeks
23 August	Elvis Presley	"In the Ghetto"	4 weeks
30 August	Elvis Presley	"In the Ghetto"	4 weeks
6 September	The Rolling Stones	"Honky Tonk Women"	5 weeks
13 September	The Rolling Stones	"Honky Tonk Women"	5 weeks
20 September	The Rolling Stones	"Honky Tonk Women"	5 weeks
27 September	The Rolling Stones	"Honky Tonk Women"	5 weeks
4 October	The Rolling Stones	"Honky Tonk Women"	5 weeks
11 October	Russell Morris	"Part Three into Paper Walls" / "The Girl That I Love"	3 weeks
18 October	Russell Morris	"Part Three into Paper Walls" / "The Girl That I Love"	3 weeks
25 October	Russell Morris	"Part Three into Paper Walls" / "The Girl That I Love"	3 weeks
1 November	Ross D. Wyllie	"The Star"	2 weeks
8 November	Ross D. Wyllie	"The Star"	2 weeks
15 November	The Beatles	"Something" / "Come Together"	5 weeks
22 November	Roy Orbison	"Penny Arcade"	1 week
29 November	The Beatles	"Something" / "Come Together"	5 weeks
6 December	The Beatles	"Something" / "Come Together"	5 weeks
13 December	The Beatles	"Something" / "Come Together"	5 weeks
20 December	The Beatles	"Something" / "Come Together"	5 weeks
27 December	Elvis Presley	"Suspicious Minds"	3 weeks (2 weeks in Jan. 1970)

Other hits
Songs peaking at number two included "Love Child" by Diana Ross and The Supremes, "Going Up the Country" by Canned Heat, "Build Me Up Buttercup" by The Foundations, "If I Can Dream" / "Edge of Reality" by Elvis Presley, "Dizzy" by Tommy Roe, "Goodbye" by Mary Hopkin, and "In the Year 2525" by Zager and Evans.

Other hits (with their peak positions noted) were "Crimson and Clover" by Tommy James and the Shondells (3), "Gitarzan" by Ray Stevens (3), "Bad Moon Rising" by Creedence Clearwater Revival (3), "My Sentimental Friend" by Herman's Hermits (3), "A Boy Named Sue" by Johnny Cash (3), "Something in the Air" by Thunderclap Newman (3), "Sweet Caroline" by Neil Diamond (3), "Star-Crossed Lovers" by Neil Sedaka (4), "Aquarius/Let the Sunshine In" by The 5th Dimension (4), "One" by Johnny Farnham (4), "Indian Giver" by 1910 Fruitgum Company (5), "Proud Mary" by Creedence Clearwater Revival (5), "Dear Prudence" by Doug Parkinson (5), "Spinning Wheel" by Blood, Sweat & Tears (5), "All Along the Watchtower" by The Jimi Hendrix Experience (6), "Give Peace a Chance" by The Plastic Ono Band (6), "Sugar, Sugar" by The Archies (6).

Hits by Australasian artists included "Saved by the Bell" by Robin Gibb, "Don't Forget to Remember" by The Bee Gees, "La La" by The Flying Circus, "Try to Remember" by New World, and "Such a Lovely Way" by The Groop. Three number-one hits were written by Australian artist Johnny Young – Russell Morris's "The Real Thing" and "Part Three into Paper Walls" and Ross D. Wyllie's "The Star"

== See also ==
- Music of Australia
- List of UK Singles Chart number ones of the 1960s
- List of Billboard number-one singles
- Lists of UK Singles Chart number ones
