= List of number-one albums in Australia during the 1960s =

Australian number-one albums of the 1960s < 1950s 1970s >

Australian top 25 singles
- 1960 1961 1962 1963 1964; 1965 1966 1967 1968 1969

Australian top 25 albums
- 1960 1961 1962 1963 1964; 1965 1966 1967 1968 1969

The following lists the number one albums on the Australian Albums Chart, during the 1960s. The source for this decade is the Kent Music Report. These charts were calculated in the 1990s in retrospect, by David Kent, using archival data. Album lists in Australia began in 1965.

Key
The yellow background indicates the #1 album on the KMR End of Year Chart
The light blue background indicates the #1 album on the KMR End of Decade Chart

== 1965 ==
Date	Artist	Album	Weeks at number one
9 January	The Beatles	A Hard Day's Night	1 week
16 January	The Rolling Stones	The Rolling Stones	3 weeks
23 January	The Rolling Stones	The Rolling Stones	3 weeks
30 January	The Rolling Stones	The Rolling Stones	3 weeks
6 February	The Beatles	Beatles for Sale	11 weeks
13 February	The Beatles	Beatles for Sale	11 weeks
20 February	The Beatles	Beatles for Sale	11 weeks
27 February	The Beatles	Beatles for Sale	11 weeks
6 March	The Beatles	Beatles for Sale	11 weeks
13 March	The Beatles	Beatles for Sale	11 weeks
20 March	The Beatles	Beatles for Sale	11 weeks
27 March	The Beatles	Beatles for Sale	11 weeks
3 April	The Beatles	Beatles for Sale	11 weeks
10 April	The Beatles	Beatles for Sale	11 weeks
17 April	The Beatles	Beatles for Sale	11 weeks
24 April	Original Soundtrack Album	The Sound of Music	76 weeks
1 May	Original Soundtrack Album	The Sound of Music	76 weeks
8 May	Original Soundtrack Album	The Sound of Music	76 weeks
15 May	Original Soundtrack Album	The Sound of Music	76 weeks
22 May	Original Soundtrack Album	The Sound of Music	76 weeks
29 May	Original Soundtrack Album	The Sound of Music	76 weeks
5 June	Original Soundtrack Album	The Sound of Music	76 weeks
12 June	Original Soundtrack Album	The Sound of Music	76 weeks
19 June	Original Soundtrack Album	The Sound of Music	76 weeks
26 June	Original Soundtrack Album	The Sound of Music	76 weeks
3 July	Original Soundtrack Album	The Sound of Music	76 weeks
10 July	Original Soundtrack Album	The Sound of Music	76 weeks
17 July	Original Soundtrack Album	The Sound of Music	76 weeks
24 July	Original Soundtrack Album	The Sound of Music	76 weeks
31 July	Original Soundtrack Album	The Sound of Music	76 weeks
7 August	Original Soundtrack Album	The Sound of Music	76 weeks
14 August	Original Soundtrack Album	The Sound of Music	76 weeks
21 August	Original Soundtrack Album	The Sound of Music	76 weeks
28 August	Original Soundtrack Album	The Sound of Music	76 weeks
4 September	Original Soundtrack Album	The Sound of Music	76 weeks
11 September	Original Soundtrack Album	The Sound of Music	76 weeks
18 September	The Beatles	Help!	11 weeks
25 September	The Beatles	Help!	11 weeks
2 October	The Beatles	Help!	11 weeks
9 October	The Beatles	Help!	11 weeks
16 October	The Beatles	Help!	11 weeks
23 October	The Beatles	Help!	11 weeks
30 October	The Beatles	Help!	11 weeks
6 November	The Beatles	Help!	11 weeks
13 November	The Beatles	Help!	11 weeks
20 November	Original Soundtrack Album	The Sound of Music	76 weeks
27 November	Original Soundtrack Album	The Sound of Music	76 weeks
4 December	Original Soundtrack Album	The Sound of Music	76 weeks
11 December	Original Soundtrack Album	The Sound of Music	76 weeks
18 December	Original Soundtrack Album	The Sound of Music	76 weeks
25 December	Original Soundtrack Album	The Sound of Music	76 weeks

== 1966 ==
Date	Artist	Album	Weeks at number one
1 January	Original Soundtrack Album	The Sound of Music	76 weeks
8 January	Original Soundtrack Album	The Sound of Music	76 weeks
15 January	Original Soundtrack Album	The Sound of Music	76 weeks
22 January	Original Soundtrack Album	The Sound of Music	76 weeks
29 January	The Beatles	Help!	11 weeks
5 February	Original Soundtrack Album	The Sound of Music	76 weeks
12 February	The Beatles	Help!	11 weeks
19 February	Original Soundtrack Album	The Sound of Music	76 weeks
26 February	The Beatles	Rubber Soul	11 weeks
5 March	The Beatles	Rubber Soul	11 weeks
12 March	The Beatles	Rubber Soul	11 weeks
19 March	The Beatles	Rubber Soul	11 weeks
26 March	The Beatles	Rubber Soul	11 weeks
2 April	The Beatles	Rubber Soul	11 weeks
9 April	The Beatles	Rubber Soul	11 weeks
16 April	The Beatles	Rubber Soul	11 weeks
23 April	The Beatles	Rubber Soul	11 weeks
30 April	The Beatles	Rubber Soul	11 weeks
7 May	Original Soundtrack Album	The Sound of Music	76 weeks
14 May	The Beatles	Rubber Soul	11 weeks
21 May	Original Soundtrack Album	The Sound of Music	76 weeks
28 May	Original Soundtrack Album	The Sound of Music	76 weeks
4 June	Original Soundtrack Album	The Sound of Music	76 weeks
11 June	Original Soundtrack Album	The Sound of Music	76 weeks
18 June	Original Soundtrack Album	The Sound of Music	76 weeks
25 June	Original Soundtrack Album	The Sound of Music	76 weeks
2 July	Original Soundtrack Album	The Sound of Music	76 weeks
9 July	Original Soundtrack Album	The Sound of Music	76 weeks
16 July	Herb Alpert & the Tijuana Brass	What Now My Love	1 week
23 July	Original Soundtrack Album	The Sound of Music	76 weeks
30 July	Original Soundtrack Album	The Sound of Music	76 weeks
6 August	Original Soundtrack Album	The Sound of Music	76 weeks
13 August	Original Soundtrack Album	The Sound of Music	76 weeks
20 August	Original Soundtrack Album	The Sound of Music	76 weeks
27 August	Original Soundtrack Album	The Sound of Music	76 weeks
3 September	Original Soundtrack Album	The Sound of Music	76 weeks
10 September	Original Soundtrack Album	The Sound of Music	76 weeks
17 September	Original Soundtrack Album	The Sound of Music	76 weeks
24 September	Original Soundtrack Album	The Sound of Music	76 weeks
1 October	The Beatles	Revolver	3 weeks
8 October	The Beatles	Revolver	3 weeks
15 October	The Beatles	Revolver	3 weeks
22 October	Original Soundtrack Album	The Sound of Music	76 weeks
29 October	Original Soundtrack Album	The Sound of Music	76 weeks
5 November	Original Soundtrack Album	The Sound of Music	76 weeks
12 November	Original Soundtrack Album	The Sound of Music	76 weeks
19 November	Original Soundtrack Album	The Sound of Music	76 weeks
26 November	Original Soundtrack Album	The Sound of Music	76 weeks
3 December	Original Soundtrack Album	The Sound of Music	76 weeks
10 December	Original Soundtrack Album	The Sound of Music	76 weeks
17 December	Original Soundtrack Album	The Sound of Music	76 weeks
24 December	Original Soundtrack Album	The Sound of Music	76 weeks
31 December	Original Soundtrack Album	The Sound of Music	76 weeks

== 1967 ==
Date	Artist	Album	Weeks at number one
7 January	Original Soundtrack Album	The Sound of Music	76 weeks
14 January	Original Soundtrack Album	The Sound of Music	76 weeks
21 January	Original Soundtrack Album	The Sound of Music	76 weeks
28 January	Original Soundtrack Album	The Sound of Music	76 weeks
4 February	Original Soundtrack Album	The Sound of Music	76 weeks
11 February	Original Soundtrack Album	The Sound of Music	76 weeks
18 February	Original Soundtrack Album	The Sound of Music	76 weeks
25 February	Original Soundtrack Album	The Sound of Music	76 weeks
4 March	Original Soundtrack Album	The Sound of Music	76 weeks
11 March	Original Soundtrack Album	The Sound of Music	76 weeks
18 March	Original Soundtrack Album	The Sound of Music	76 weeks
25 March	Original Soundtrack Album	The Sound of Music	76 weeks
1 April	Original Soundtrack Album	The Sound of Music	76 weeks
8 April	Herb Alpert & the Tijuana Brass	Going Places	17 weeks
15 April	Herb Alpert & the Tijuana Brass	Going Places	17 weeks
22 April	Herb Alpert & the Tijuana Brass	Going Places	17 weeks
29 April	Herb Alpert & the Tijuana Brass	Going Places	17 weeks
6 May	Herb Alpert & the Tijuana Brass	Going Places	17 weeks
13 May	Herb Alpert & the Tijuana Brass	Going Places	17 weeks
20 May	Herb Alpert & the Tijuana Brass	Going Places	17 weeks
27 May	Herb Alpert & the Tijuana Brass	Going Places	17 weeks
3 June	Herb Alpert & the Tijuana Brass	Going Places	17 weeks
10 June	Herb Alpert & the Tijuana Brass	Going Places	17 weeks
17 June	Herb Alpert & the Tijuana Brass	Going Places	17 weeks
24 June	Herb Alpert & the Tijuana Brass	Going Places	17 weeks
1 July	Herb Alpert & the Tijuana Brass	Going Places	17 weeks
8 July	Herb Alpert & the Tijuana Brass	Going Places	17 weeks
15 July	Herb Alpert & the Tijuana Brass	Going Places	17 weeks
22 July	Herb Alpert & the Tijuana Brass	Going Places	17 weeks
29 July	Herb Alpert & the Tijuana Brass	Going Places	17 weeks
5 August	The Beatles	Sgt. Pepper's Lonely Hearts Club Band	30 weeks
12 August	The Beatles	Sgt. Pepper's Lonely Hearts Club Band	30 weeks
19 August	The Beatles	Sgt. Pepper's Lonely Hearts Club Band	30 weeks
26 August	The Beatles	Sgt. Pepper's Lonely Hearts Club Band	30 weeks
2 September	The Beatles	Sgt. Pepper's Lonely Hearts Club Band	30 weeks
9 September	The Beatles	Sgt. Pepper's Lonely Hearts Club Band	30 weeks
16 September	The Beatles	Sgt. Pepper's Lonely Hearts Club Band	30 weeks
23 September	The Beatles	Sgt. Pepper's Lonely Hearts Club Band	30 weeks
30 September	The Beatles	Sgt. Pepper's Lonely Hearts Club Band	30 weeks
7 October	The Beatles	Sgt. Pepper's Lonely Hearts Club Band	30 weeks
14 October	The Beatles	Sgt. Pepper's Lonely Hearts Club Band	30 weeks
21 October	The Beatles	Sgt. Pepper's Lonely Hearts Club Band	30 weeks
28 October	The Beatles	Sgt. Pepper's Lonely Hearts Club Band	30 weeks
4 November	The Beatles	Sgt. Pepper's Lonely Hearts Club Band	30 weeks
11 November	The Beatles	Sgt. Pepper's Lonely Hearts Club Band	30 weeks
18 November	The Beatles	Sgt. Pepper's Lonely Hearts Club Band	30 weeks
25 November	The Beatles	Sgt. Pepper's Lonely Hearts Club Band	30 weeks
2 December	The Beatles	Sgt. Pepper's Lonely Hearts Club Band	30 weeks
9 December	The Beatles	Sgt. Pepper's Lonely Hearts Club Band	30 weeks
16 December	The Beatles	Sgt. Pepper's Lonely Hearts Club Band	30 weeks
23 December	The Beatles	Sgt. Pepper's Lonely Hearts Club Band	30 weeks
30 December	The Beatles	Sgt. Pepper's Lonely Hearts Club Band	30 weeks

== 1968 ==
Date	Artist	Album	Weeks at number one
6 January	The Beatles	Sgt. Pepper's Lonely Hearts Club Band	30 weeks
13 January	The Beatles	Sgt. Pepper's Lonely Hearts Club Band	30 weeks
20 January	The Beatles	Sgt. Pepper's Lonely Hearts Club Band	30 weeks
27 January	The Beatles	Sgt. Pepper's Lonely Hearts Club Band	30 weeks
3 February	The Beatles	Sgt. Pepper's Lonely Hearts Club Band	30 weeks
10 February	The Beatles	Sgt. Pepper's Lonely Hearts Club Band	30 weeks
17 February	The Beatles	Sgt. Pepper's Lonely Hearts Club Band	30 weeks
24 February	The Beatles	Sgt. Pepper's Lonely Hearts Club Band	30 weeks
2 March	The Rolling Stones	Their Satanic Majesties Request	3 weeks
9 March	The Rolling Stones	Their Satanic Majesties Request	3 weeks
16 March	The Rolling Stones	Their Satanic Majesties Request	3 weeks
23 March	Bob Dylan	John Wesley Harding	1 weeks
30 March	Cream	Disraeli Gears	2 weeks
6 April	Cream	Disraeli Gears	2 weeks
13 April	Original Soundtrack Album	A Man and a Woman (Un homme et une femme)	13 weeks
20 April	Original Soundtrack Album	A Man and a Woman (Un homme et une femme)	13 weeks
27 April	Original Soundtrack Album	A Man and a Woman (Un homme et une femme)	13 weeks
4 May	Original Soundtrack Album	A Man and a Woman (Un homme et une femme)	13 weeks
11 May	Original Soundtrack Album	A Man and a Woman (Un homme et une femme)	13 weeks
18 May	Original Soundtrack Album	A Man and a Woman (Un homme et une femme)	13 weeks
25 May	Original Soundtrack Album	A Man and a Woman (Un homme et une femme)	13 weeks
1 June	Original Soundtrack Album	A Man and a Woman (Un homme et une femme)	13 weeks
8 June	Original Soundtrack Album	A Man and a Woman (Un homme et une femme)	13 weeks
15 June	Paul Mauriat and His Orchestra	Blooming Hits	2 weeks
22 June	Paul Mauriat and His Orchestra	Blooming Hits	2 weeks
29 June	Original Motion Picture Soundtrack	A Man and a Woman (Un homme et une femme)	13 weeks
6 July	Original Motion Picture Soundtrack	A Man and a Woman (Un homme et une femme)	13 weeks
13 July	Original Motion Picture Soundtrack	A Man and a Woman (Un homme et une femme)	13 weeks
20 July	Original Motion Picture Soundtrack	A Man and a Woman (Un homme et une femme)	13 weeks
27 July	The Seekers	The Seekers' Greatest Hits	17 weeks
3 August	The Seekers	The Seekers' Greatest Hits	17 weeks
10 August	The Seekers	The Seekers' Greatest Hits	17 weeks
17 August	The Seekers	The Seekers' Greatest Hits	17 weeks
24 August	The Seekers	The Seekers' Greatest Hits	17 weeks
31 August	The Seekers	The Seekers' Greatest Hits	17 weeks
7 September	The Seekers	The Seekers' Greatest Hits	17 weeks
14 September	The Seekers	The Seekers' Greatest Hits	17 weeks
21 September	The Seekers	The Seekers' Greatest Hits	17 weeks
28 September	The Seekers	The Seekers' Greatest Hits	17 weeks
5 October	The Seekers	The Seekers' Greatest Hits	17 weeks
12 October	The Seekers	The Seekers' Greatest Hits	17 weeks
19 October	The Seekers	The Seekers' Greatest Hits	17 weeks
26 October	The Seekers	The Seekers' Greatest Hits	17 weeks
2 November	The Seekers	The Seekers' Greatest Hits	17 weeks
9 November	The Seekers	The Seekers' Greatest Hits	17 weeks
16 November	The Seekers	The Seekers' Greatest Hits	17 weeks
23 November	The Jimi Hendrix Experience	Smash Hits	1 week
30 November	Soundtrack / Simon and Garfunkel	The Graduate	1 week
7 December	Cream	Wheels of Fire	2 weeks
14 December	Cream	Wheels of Fire	2 weeks
21 December	The Beatles	The Beatles (The White Album)	16 weeks
28 December	The Beatles	The Beatles (The White Album)	16 weeks

== 1969 ==
Date	Artist	Album	Weeks at number one
4 January	The Beatles	The Beatles (The White Album)	16 weeks
11 January	The Beatles	The Beatles (The White Album)	16 weeks
18 January	The Beatles	The Beatles (The White Album)	16 weeks
25 January	The Beatles	The Beatles (The White Album)	16 weeks
1 February	The Beatles	The Beatles (The White Album)	16 weeks
8 February	The Beatles	The Beatles (The White Album)	16 weeks
15 February	The Beatles	The Beatles (The White Album)	16 weeks
22 February	The Beatles	The Beatles (The White Album)	16 weeks
1 March	The Beatles	The Beatles (The White Album)	16 weeks
8 March	The Beatles	The Beatles (The White Album)	16 weeks
15 March	The Beatles	The Beatles (The White Album)	16 weeks
22 March	The Beatles	The Beatles (The White Album)	16 weeks
29 March	The Beatles	The Beatles (The White Album)	16 weeks
5 April	The Beatles	The Beatles (The White Album)	16 weeks
12 April	Original Broadway Cast	Hair	28 weeks
19 April	Original Broadway Cast	Hair	28 weeks
26 April	Original Broadway Cast	Hair	28 weeks
3 May	Original Broadway Cast	Hair	28 weeks
10 May	Original Broadway Cast	Hair	28 weeks
17 May	Original Broadway Cast	Hair	28 weeks
24 May	Original Broadway Cast	Hair	28 weeks
31 May	Original Broadway Cast	Hair	28 weeks
7 June	Original Broadway Cast	Hair	28 weeks
14 June	Original Broadway Cast	Hair	28 weeks
21 June	Original Broadway Cast	Hair	28 weeks
28 June	Original Broadway Cast	Hair	28 weeks
5 July	Original Broadway Cast	Hair	28 weeks
12 July	Original Broadway Cast	Hair	28 weeks
19 July	Original Broadway Cast	Hair	28 weeks
26 July	Original Broadway Cast	Hair	28 weeks
2 August	Original Broadway Cast	Hair	28 weeks
9 August	Original Broadway Cast	Hair	28 weeks
16 August	Original Broadway Cast	Hair	28 weeks
23 August	Original Broadway Cast	Hair	28 weeks
30 August	Original Broadway Cast	Hair	28 weeks
6 September	Original Broadway Cast	Hair	28 weeks
13 September	Original Broadway Cast	Hair	28 weeks
20 September	Original Broadway Cast	Hair	28 weeks
27 September	Original Broadway Cast	Hair	28 weeks
4 October	Original Broadway Cast	Hair	28 weeks
11 October	Original Broadway Cast	Hair	28 weeks
18 October	Original Broadway Cast	Hair	28 weeks
25 October	The Beatles	Abbey Road	18 weeks
1 November	The Beatles	Abbey Road	18 weeks
8 November	The Beatles	Abbey Road	18 weeks
15 November	The Beatles	Abbey Road	18 weeks
22 November	The Beatles	Abbey Road	18 weeks
29 November	The Beatles	Abbey Road	18 weeks
6 December	The Beatles	Abbey Road	18 weeks
13 December	The Beatles	Abbey Road	18 weeks
20 December	The Beatles	Abbey Road	18 weeks
27 December	The Beatles	Abbey Road	18 weeks

== See also ==
- List of artists who reached number one on the Australian singles chart
- List of number-one albums in Australia during the 1970s
- List of number-one albums in Australia during the 1980s
- List of number-one albums in Australia during the 1990s
- List of number-one singles in Australia during the 1960s
- List of number-one singles in Australia during the 1970s
- List of number-one singles in Australia during the 1980s
- List of number-one singles in Australia during the 1990s
- List of UK Albums Chart number ones of the 1960s
- Lists of Billboard 200 number-one albums
- Lists of UK Albums Chart number ones
- Music of Australia
