= List of top 25 albums for 1968 in Australia =

Top 25 albums of 1968 < 1967 1969 >

Other Australian top charts for 1968
- top 25 singles

Australian number-one charts of 1968
- albums
- singles

The following lists the top 25 (end of year) charting albums on the Australian Album Charts, for the year of 1968. These were the best charting albums in Australia for 1968. The source for this year is the "Kent Music Report", known from 1987 onwards as the "Australian Music Report".

#	Title	Artist	Highest pos. reached	Weeks at No. 1
1.	The Seekers' Greatest Hits	The Seekers	1	17
2.	A Man and a Woman	Soundtrack	1	13
3.	Sgt. Peppers Lonely Hearts Club Band	The Beatles	1	30 (pkd #1 in 1967 & 68)
4.	The Sound of Music	Original Soundtrack Recording	1	76 (pkd #1 in 1965, 66 & 67)
5.	The Graduate	Soundtrack / Simon and Garfunkel	1	1
6.	Blooming Hits	Paul Mauriat	1	2
7.	Vanilla Fudge	Vanilla Fudge	2	
8.	Camelot	Soundtrack	3	
9.	Trumpet a Go Go	James Last Band	3	
10.	Introducing the Seekers	The Seekers	5	
11.	Smash Hits	Jimi Hendrix Experience	1	1
12.	Fiddler on the Roof	Original London Cast	4	
13.	Disraeli Gears	Cream	1	2
14.	John Wesley Harding	Bob Dylan	1	1
15.	Their Satanic Majesties Request	Rolling Stones	1	3
16.	The Seekers Sing Their Big Hits	The Seekers	3	
17.	Realization	Johnny Rivers	7	
18.	Wheels of Fire	Cream	1	2
19.	Seekers Seen in Green	The Seekers	2	
20.	Jim Nabors By Request	Jim Nabors	7	
21.	A Man Without Love	Engelbert Humperdinck	2	
22.	Our Kinda Country	Various Artists	7	
23.	Are You Experienced	Jimi Hendrix Experience	2	
24.	Going Places	Herb Alpert and the Tijuana Brass	1	17 (pkd #1 in 1867)
25.	Diana Ross and the Supremes Live at the Talk of the Town	Diana Ross and the Supremes	7	

These charts are calculated by David Kent of the Kent Music Report and they are based on the number of weeks and position the records reach within the top 100 albums for each week.

source: David Kent's "Australian Chart Book 1940-1969"
