= List of top 25 singles for 1962 in Australia =

Top 25 singles of 1962 < 1961 1963 >

Other Australian top charts for 1962
- top 25 albums

Australian number-one charts of 1962
- albums
- singles

The following lists the top 25 (end of year) charting singles on the Australian Singles Charts, for the year of 1962. These were the best charting singles in Australia for 1962. The source for this year is the "Kent Music Report", known from 1987 onwards as the "Australian Music Report".

#	Title	Artist	Highest pos. reached	Weeks at No. 1
1.	"Working for the Man" / "Leah"	Roy Orbison	1	5
2.	"Can't Help Falling in Love" / "Rock-A-Hula Baby"	Elvis Presley	1	5
3.	"Good Luck Charm" / "Anything That's Part of You"	Elvis Presley	1	6
4.	"Roses Are Red (My Love)"	Bobby Vinton	1	4
5.	"Multiplication"	Bobby Darin	1	3
6.	"The Lonely Bull"	Herb Alpert and the Tijuana Brass	1	3
7.	"I Can't Stop Loving You"	Ray Charles	1	4
8.	"Stranger on the Shore"	Acker Bilk	1	1
9.	"Telstar"	The Tornados	2	
10.	"The Swiss Maid"	Del Shannon	1	3
11.	"Wolverton Mountain"	Claude King	1	1
12.	"Midnight in Moscow"	Kenny Ball and His Jazzmen	1	1
13.	"I Remember You"	Frank Ifield	1	2
14.	"I've Been Everywhere"	Lucky Starr	1	2
15.	"Sheila"	Tommy Roe	1	3
16.	"Alley Cat"	Bent Fabric	2	
17.	"Dear One"	Larry Finnegan	1	2
18.	"Ramblin' Rose"	Nat King Cole	1	1
19.	"Let There Be Drums"	Sandy Nelson	1	1
20.	"West of the Wall"	Toni Fisher	1	2
21.	"The Wanderer" / "The Majestic"	Dion	1	1
22.	"Limbo Rock"	Chubby Checker	8	
23.	"The Cha-Cha-Cha"	Bobby Rydell	2	
24.	"Do You Want to Dance"	Cliff Richard	3	
25.	"Chip Chip"	Gene McDaniels	2	

These charts are calculated by David Kent of the Kent Music Report and they are based on the number of weeks and position the records reach within the top 100 singles for each week.

source: David Kent's "Australian Chart Book 1940-1969"
