= List of top 25 albums for 1965 in Australia =

Top 25 albums of 1965 < 1964 1966 >

Other Australian top charts for 1965
- top 25 singles

Australian number-one charts of 1965
- albums
- singles

The following lists the top 25 (end of year) charting albums on the Australian Album Charts, for the year of 1965. These were the best charting albums in Australia for 1965. The source for this year is the "Kent Music Report", known from 1987 onwards as the "Australian Music Report".

| # | Title | Artist | Highest pos. reached | weeks at No. 1 |
|---|---|---|---|---|
| 1. | The Sound of Music | Original Soundtrack Recording | 1 | 76 (pkd #1 1965, 66 & 67) |
| 2. | Beatles For Sale | The Beatles | 1 | 11 |
| 3. | Mary Poppins | Soundtrack | 2 | |
| 4. | Help! | The Beatles | 2 | 11 (pkd #1 1965 & 66) |
| 5. | It Ain't Necessarily So, But It Is Normie Rowe | Normie Rowe | 2 | |
| 6. | 12 x 5 | Rolling Stones | 2 | |
| 7. | Roustabout | Elvis Presley | 2 | |
| 8. | Billy Thorpe and the Aztecs | Billy Thorpe and the Aztecs | 2 | |
| 9. | The Rolling Stones | Rolling Stones | 1 | 3 |
| 10. | Headin' For the Top | Ray Brown & The Whispers | 4 | |
| 11. | I Got You Babe | Sonny and Cher | 3 | |
| 12. | A Song Will Rise | Peter, Paul and Mary | 3 | |
| 13. | Out of Our Heads | Rolling Stones | 2 | |
| 14. | Hello Dolly | Broadway Cast | 3 | |
| 15. | Peter, Paul and Mary in Concert | Peter, Paul and Mary | 4 | |
| 16. | Easy | The Easybeats | 4 | |
| 17. | The Rolling Stones, Now! | Rolling Stones | 2 | |
| 18. | Australian Broadside | Gary Shearston | 3 | |
| 19. | Ray Brown and the Whispers | Ray Brown & The Whispers | 4 | |
| 20. | A Hard Day's Night | The Beatles | 1 | 1 |
| 21. | The Barbra Streisand Album | Barbra Streisand | 6 | |
| 22. | Shirley Bassey Stops the Shows | Shirley Bassey | 2 | |
| 23. | Normie Rowe a Go Go | Normie Rowe | 3 | |
| 24. | See What Tomorrow Brings | Peter, Paul and Mary | 2 | |
| 25. | Girl Happy | Elvis Presley | 5 | |

These charts are calculated by David Kent of the Kent Music Report and they are based on the number of weeks and position the records reach within the top 100 albums for each week.

source: David Kent's "Australian Chart Book 1940-1969"
