= List of top 25 singles for 1965 in Australia =

Top 25 singles of 1965 < 1964 1966 >

Other Australian top charts for 1965
- top 25 albums

Australian number-one charts of 1965
- albums
- singles

The following lists the top 25 (end of year) charting singles on the Australian Singles Charts, for the year of 1965. These were the best charting singles in Australia for 1965. The source for this year is the "Kent Music Report", known from 1987 onwards as the "Australian Music Report".

#	Title	Artist	Highest pos. reached	Weeks at No. 1
1.	"Que Sera, Sera" / "Shakin' All Over"	Normie Rowe	1	8
2.	"The Carnival is Over"	The Seekers	1	6 (pkd #1 in 1965 & 66)
3.	"Help!"	The Beatles	1	8
4.	"Rock and Roll Music" / "Honey Don't"	The Beatles	1	4
5.	"Crying in the Chapel"	Elvis Presley	1	6
6.	"I'll Never Find Another You"	The Seekers	1	3
7.	"The Wedding"	Julie Rogers	1	1
8.	"Under the Boardwalk" / "Walking the Dog" EP	Rolling Stones	1	3
9.	"Mrs. Brown, You've Got a Lovely Daughter"	Herman's Hermits	1	4
10.	"Ticket to Ride"	The Beatles	1	3
11.	"Il Silenzio"	Nini Rosso	2	
12.	"I Told the Brook" / "Funny Face"	Billy Thorpe and the Aztecs	1	1
13.	"Tell Him I'm Not Home"	Normie Rowe	3	
14.	"(I Can't Get No) Satisfaction"	Rolling Stones	1	1
15.	"Yesterday" / "It's Only Love"	The Beatles	2	
16.	"A World of Our Own"	The Seekers	2	
17.	"Pride" / "Say It Again"	Ray Brown & The Whispers	3	
18.	"She's So Fine"	The Easybeats	3	
19.	"Downtown"	Petula Clark	1	1
20.	"A Walk in the Black Forest"	Horst Jankowski	4	
21.	"Sing C'est La Vie"	Sonny and Cher	2	
22.	"I Got You Babe"	Sonny and Cher	3	
23.	"Over the Rainbow"	Billy Thorpe and the Aztecs	2	
24.	"Fool, Fool, Fool"	Ray Brown & The Whispers	3	
25.	"Get Off Of My Cloud"	Rolling Stones	2	

These charts are calculated by David Kent of the Kent Music Report and they are based on the number of weeks and position the records reach within the top 100 singles for each week.

source: David Kent's "Australian Chart Book 1940-1969"
