= List of top 25 singles for 1966 in Australia =

Top 25 singles of 1966 < 1965 1967 >

Other Australian top charts for 1966
- top 25 albums

Australian number-one charts of 1966
- albums
- singles

The following lists the top 25 (end of year) charting singles on the Australian Singles Charts, for the year of 1966. These were the best charting singles in Australia for 1966. The source for this year is the "Kent Music Report", known from 1987 onwards as the "Australian Music Report".

#	Title	Artist	Highest pos. reached	Weeks at No. 1
1.	"These Boots Are Made for Walkin'"	Nancy Sinatra	1	8
2.	"We Can Work It Out" / "Day Tripper"	The Beatles	1	7
3.	"Yellow Submarine" / "Eleanor Rigby"	The Beatles	1	8
4.	"Hitch Hiker"	Bobby and Laurie	1	5
5.	"Somewhere, My Love (Lara's Theme)"	Ray Conniff and the Singers	2	
6.	"Lady Godiva"	Peter and Gordon	1	3
7.	"Ooh La La"	Normie Rowe	1	3 (pkd #1 in 1966 & 67)
8.	"Step Back" / "Cara Lyn"	Johnny Young and Kompany	2	
9.	"Winchester Cathedral"	The New Vaudeville Band	1	1
10.	"Friday on My Mind"	The Easybeats	1	2
11.	"Strangers in the Night"	Frank Sinatra	1	2
12.	"Paint It Black"	The Rolling Stones	1	3
13.	"Good Vibrations"	The Beach Boys	1	1
14.	"Mama"	B. J. Thomas	1	1
15.	"Nowhere Man" / "Norwegian Wood"	The Beatles	1	2
16.	"No Milk Today"	Herman's Hermits	1	1
17.	"Easyfever (EP)"	The Easybeats	1	2
18.	"Let It Be Me"	Johnny Young and Kompany	4	
19.	"Born Free"	Matt Monro	4	
20.	"Wild Thing"	The Troggs	1	2
21.	"Sorry"	The Easybeats	1	1
22.	"Michelle"	The Overlanders	2	
23.	"As Tears Go By" / "19th Nervous Breakdown"	The Rolling Stones	2	
24.	"Tar and Cement"	Verdelle Smith	2	
25.	"Spicks and Specks"	Bee Gees	5	

These charts are calculated by David Kent of the Kent Music Report and they are based on the number of weeks and position the records reach within the top 100 singles for each week.

source: David Kent's "Australian Chart Book 1940-1969"
