= List of top 25 singles for 1960 in Australia =

Top 25 singles of 1960 < 1959 1961 >

Other Australian top charts for 1960
- top 25 albums

Australian number-one charts of 1960
- albums
- singles

The following lists the top 25 (end of year) charting singles on the Australian Singles Charts, for the year of 1960. These were the best charting singles in Australia for 1960. The source for this year is the "Kent Music Report", known from 1987 onwards as the "Australian Music Report".

#	Title	Artist	Highest pos. reached	Weeks at No. 1
1.	"It's Now or Never"	Elvis Presley	1	7
2.	"Boom Boom Baby"	Crash Craddock	1	4
3.	"He'll Have to Go"	Jim Reeves	1	4
4.	"Are You Lonesome Tonight?" / "I Gotta Know"	Elvis Presley	1	6
5.	"Clap Your Hands"	The Beau Marks	1	4
6.	"Just a Closer Walk with Thee"	Jimmie Rodgers	1	2
7.	"Save the Last Dance for Me"	The Drifters	1	4
8.	"Tie Me Kangaroo Down Sport"	Rolf Harris	1	3
9.	"What Do You Want to Make Those Eyes at Me For?"	Emile Ford and The Checkmates	1	4
10.	"My Old Man's a Dustman"	Lonnie Donegan	1	2
11.	"North to Alaska"	Johnny Horton	2	
12.	"Everybody's Somebody's Fool"	Connie Francis	1	3
13.	"She's My Baby" / "Own True Self"	Johnny O'Keefe	1	1
14.	"Swingin' School" / "Ding-A-Ling"	Bobby Rydell	1	2
15.	"Peter Gunn"	Duane Eddy	2	
16.	"Walk Don't Run"	The Ventures	1	2
17.	"Beatnik Fly"	Johnny and the Hurricanes	1	2
18.	"I Found a New Love" / "Defenceless"	Lonnie Lee	2	
19.	"Running Bear"	Johnny Preston	2	
20.	"Little Boy Lost"	Johnny Ashcroft	3	
21.	"Come on and Take My Hand" / "Don't You Know"	Johnny O'Keefe	1	1
22.	"Stuck on You" / "Fame and Fortune"	Elvis Presley	1	1
23.	"What in the World's Come Over You"	Jack Scott	2	
24.	"Please Don't Tease"	Cliff Richard & The Shadows	2	
25.	"Cathy's Clown"	Everly Brothers	3	

These charts are calculated by David Kent of the Kent Music Report and they are based on the number of weeks and position the records reach within the top 100 singles for each week.

source: David Kent's "Australian Chart Book 1940-1969"
