= List of top 25 singles for 1964 in Australia =

Top 25 singles of 1964 < 1963 1965 >

Other Australian top charts for 1964
- top 25 albums

Australian number-one charts of 1964
- albums
- singles

The following lists the top 25 (end of year) charting singles on the Australian Singles Charts, for the year of 1964. These were the best charting singles in Australia for 1964. The source for this year is the "Kent Music Report", known from 1987 onwards as the "Australian Music Report".

#	Title	Artist	Highest pos. reached	Weeks at No. 1
1.	"I Saw Her Standing There" / "Love Me Do"	The Beatles	1	7
2.	"I Feel Fine" / "She's a Woman"	The Beatles	1	8 (pkd #1 in 1964 & 65)
3.	"Can't Buy Me Love" / "You Can't Do That"	The Beatles	1	6
4.	"A Hard Day's Night" / "Things We Said Today"	The Beatles	1	6
5.	"All My Loving (EP)"	The Beatles	1	3
6.	"I Should Have Known Better" / "If I Fell"	The Beatles	1	5
7.	"Ain't That Loving You Baby"	Elvis Presley	2	
8.	"Have I The Right?"	The Honeycombs	2	
9.	"You're My World"	Cilla Black	1	2
10.	"Oh, Pretty Woman"	Roy Orbison	1	1
11.	"Roll Over Beethoven" / "Hold Me Tight"	The Beatles	1	2
12.	"My Guy"	Mary Wells	1	2
13.	"She's a Mod"	Ray Columbus and the Invaders	1	2
14.	"Requests (EP)"	The Beatles	1	1
15.	"Viva Las Vegas"	Elvis Presley	4	
16.	"My Boy Lollipop"	Millie	2	
17.	"The House of the Rising Sun"	The Animals	1	5
18.	"Poison Ivy"	Billy Thorpe	3	
19.	"Do Wah Diddy Diddy"	Manfred Mann	2	
20.	"A World Without Love"	Peter and Gordon	2	
21.	"Such a Night"	Elvis Presley	3	
22.	"Glad All Over"	Dave Clark Five	3	
23.	"Don't Talk to Him"	Cliff Richard	3	
24.	"The Rise and Fall of Flingle Bunt"	The Shadows	5	
25.	"William Tell Overture" / "Maria"	Sounds Incorporated	2	

These charts are calculated by David Kent of the Kent Music Report and they are based on the number of weeks and position the records reach within the top 100 singles for each week.

source: David Kent's "Australian Chart Book 1940-1969"
