= List of top 25 singles for 1961 in Australia =

Top 25 singles of 1961 < 1960 1962 >

Other Australian top charts for 1961
- top 25 albums

Australian number-one charts of 1961
- albums
- singles

The following lists the top 25 (end of year) charting singles on the Australian Singles Charts, for the year of 1961. These were the best charting singles in Australia for 1961. The source for this year is the "Kent Music Report", known from 1987 onwards as the "Australian Music Report".

#	Title	Artist	Highest pos. reached	Weeks at No. 1
1.	"I'm Gonna Knock on Your Door"	Eddie Hodges	1	7
2.	"Runaway"	Del Shannon	1	6
3.	"Wooden Heart"	Elvis Presley	1	4
4.	"Hello Mary Lou"	Ricky Nelson	1	5
5.	"My Boomerang Won't Come Back"	Charlie Drake	1	6 (pkd #1 in 1960 & 61)
6.	"A Scottish Soldier"	Andy Stewart	1	1
7.	"I'm Counting on You"	Johnny O'Keefe	1	3
8.	"Wonderland by Night"	Bert Kaempfert and His Orchestra	1	3
9.	"Theme from Exodus"	Ferrante and Teicher	2	
10.	"Crying" / "Candy Man"	Roy Orbison	1	3
11.	"Goodbye Cruel World"	James Darren	1	2
12.	"Rubber Ball"	Bobby Vee	1	3
13.	"Mexico"	Bob Moore and His Orchestra	1	2
14.	"Surrender"	Elvis Presley	1	3
15.	"One Last Kiss"	Crash Craddock	1	1
16.	"Wheels"	The String-A-Longs	2	
17.	"Michael"	The Highwaymen	1	1
18.	"Take Good Care of My Baby"	Bobby Vee	3	
19.	"(Marie's the Name of) His Latest Flame" / "Little Sister"	Elvis Presley	2	
20.	"Baby Face" / "How Many Tears"	Bobby Vee	3	
21.	"Sad Movies (Make Me Cry)"	Sue Thompson	6	
22.	"Sailor (Seeman)"	Lolita	6	
23.	"Together"	Connie Francis	2	
24.	"Hit the Road Jack"	Ray Charles	3	
25.	"Little Devil"	Neil Sedaka	3	

These charts are calculated by David Kent of the Kent Music Report and they are based on the number of weeks and position the records reach within the top 100 singles for each week.

source: David Kent's "Australian Chart Book 1940-1969"
