= List of top 25 singles for 1969 in Australia =

Top 25 singles of 1969 < 1968 1970 >

Other Australian top charts for 1969
- top 25 albums

Australian number-one charts of 1969
- albums
- singles

The following lists the top 25 (end of year) charting singles on the Australian Singles Charts, for the year of 1969. These were the best charting singles in Australia for 1969. The source for this year is the "Kent Music Report", known from 1987 onwards as the "Australian Music Report".

#	Title	Artist	Highest pos. reached	Weeks at No. 1
1.	"Something" / "Come Together"	The Beatles	1	5
2.	"Honky Tonk Women"	Rolling Stones	1	5
3.	"Ob-La-Di, Ob-La-Da" / "While My Guitar Gently Weeps"	The Beatles	1	6
4.	"The Real Thing"	Russell Morris	1	2
5.	"Suspicious Minds"	Elvis Presley	1	3 (pkd #1 in 1969 & 70)
6.	"Part Three into Paper Walls / "The Girl That I Love"	Russell Morris	1	3
7.	"Penny Arcade"	Roy Orbison	1	1
8.	"Get Back / Don't Let Me Down"	The Beatles	1	4
9.	"Hair"	The Cowsills	1	2
10.	"Where Do You Go To (My Lovely)"	Peter Sarstedt	1	4
11.	"In the Ghetto"	Elvis Presley	1	4
12.	"Eloise"	Barry Ryan	1	3
13.	"White Room"	Cream	1	2
14.	"The Ballad of John and Yoko"	The Beatles	1	4
15.	"The Star"	Ross D. Wyllie	1	2
16.	"I Started a Joke"	Bee Gees	1	2
17.	"Lily the Pink"	The Scaffold	1	2
18.	"One"	Johnny Farnham	4	
19.	"Picking Up Pebbles"	Matt Flinders	4	
20.	"Star Crossed Lovers"	Neil Sedaka	4	
21.	"If I Can Dream" / "Edge of Reality"	Elvis Presley	2	
22.	"Build Me Up Buttercup"	The Foundations	2	
23.	"My Sentimental Friend"	Herman's Hermits	3	
24.	"Dizzy"	Tommy Roe	2	
25.	"Going Up the Country"	Canned Heat	2	

These charts are calculated by David Kent of the Kent Music Report and they are based on the number of weeks and position the records reach within the top 100 singles for each week.

source: David Kent's "Australian Chart Book 1940-1969"
