= Come the Day =

Studio album by The Seekers
- Released: 1966
- Studios: Abbey Road Studios, London
- Genres: Pop, Folk, World, Country
- Length: 31:13
- Labels: Columbia Records, Capitol Records
- Producer: Tom Springfield

The Seekers chronology
The Seekers Sing Their Big Hits (1965)	Come the Day (1966)	Introducing the Seekers Big Hits (1967)

Alternative cover
- North American album cover

Come the Day is the fifth studio album by Australian group the Seekers. The album was released in 1966. In North America, the album was titled Georgy Girl. The album peaked at number 10 in the Billboard albums chart, at number 3 in the United Kingdom, and at number 7 in Australia.

== Reception ==
Bruce Eder from AllMusic said: "It was on this album that all of The Seekers' varied attributes... kicked in at their peak at the same time. The album opens with the title track, a Woodley original that's one of the best folk-style recordings to come out of the British Invasion and also one of the Seekers' greatest performances."

== Track listing ==
Side 1

1. "Come the Day" (Bruce Woodley)
2. "Island of Dreams" (Tom Springfield)
3. "The Last Thing on My Mind" (Tom Paxton)
4. "All Over the World (Dans le Monde en Entier)" (Françoise Hardy, Julian More)
5. "Red Rubber Ball" (Paul Simon, Bruce Woodley)
6. "Well, Well, Well" (Bob Gibson, Bob Camp)

Side 2

1. "Georgy Girl" (Jim Dale, Tom Springfield)
2. "Yesterday" (John Lennon, Paul McCartney)
3. "I Wish You Could Be Here" (Paul Simon, Bruce Woodley)
4. "Turn, Turn, Turn" (Pete Seeger)
5. "Louisiana Man" (Doug Kershaw)
6. "California Dreamin'" (John Phillips, Michelle Phillips)

== Charts ==
=== Weekly charts ===
Chart (1966–67)	Position
Australian Kent Music Report	7

=== Year-end charts ===
Chart (1967)	Position
Australian Albums Chart	12
