= List of top 25 singles for 1968 in Australia =

Top 25 singles of 1968 < 1967 1969 >

Other Australian top charts for 1968
- top 25 albums

Australian number-one charts of 1968
- albums
- singles

The following lists the top 25 (end of year) charting singles on the Australian Singles Charts, for the year of 1968. These were the best charting singles in Australia for 1968. The source for this year is the "Kent Music Report", known from 1987 onwards as the "Australian Music Report".

#	Title	Artist	Highest pos. reached	Weeks at No. 1
1.	"Hey Jude" / "Revolution"	The Beatles	1	13
2.	"Sadie (The Cleaning Lady)"	Johnny Farnham	1	6
3.	"Love is Blue"	Paul Mauriat	1	5
4.	"Honey"	Bobby Goldsboro	1	5
5.	"The Unicorn"	The Irish Rovers	1	4
6.	"Those Were the Days"	Mary Hopkin	2	
7.	"Little Arrows"	Leapy Lee	2	
8.	"The Orange and the Green" / "Whiskey on a Sunday"	The Irish Rovers	1	3
9.	"MacArthur Park (song)"	Richard Harris	1	2
10.	"Hello, Goodbye" / "I Am the Walrus"	The Beatles	1	2
11.	"This Guy's in Love with You"	Herb Alpert and the Tijuana Brass	1	2
12.	"Angel of the Morning"	Merrilee Rush	1	2
13.	"Harper Valley PTA"	Jeannie C. Riley	1	1
14.	"Judy in Disguise (With Glasses)"	John Fred and his Playboy Band	1	2
15.	"Help Yourself"	Tom Jones	1	2
16.	"Lady Madonna"	The Beatles	1	2
17.	"Delilah"	Tom Jones	2	
18.	"Dream a Little Dream of Me"	Mama Cass with The Mamas & the Papas	1	1
19.	"Love Child"	Diana Ross and the Supremes	2	
20.	"Young Girl"	Gary Puckett & The Union Gap	2	
21.	"Daydream Believer"	The Monkees	2	
22.	"Hold Me Tight"	Johnny Nash	4	
23.	"The Good, the Bad and the Ugly"	Hugo Montenegro	3	
24.	"Indian Lake"	The Cowsills	3	
25.	"Do It Again"	Beach Boys	2	

These charts are calculated by David Kent of the Kent Music Report and they are based on the number of weeks and position the records reach within the top 100 singles for each week.

source: David Kent's "Australian Chart Book 1940-1969"
