= List of top 25 albums for 1966 in Australia =

Top 25 albums of 1966 < 1965 1967 >

Other Australian top charts for 1966
- top 25 singles

Australian number-one charts of 1966
- albums
- singles

The following lists the top 25 (end of year) charting albums on the Australian Album Charts, for the year of 1966. These were the best charting albums in Australia for 1966. The source for this year is the "Kent Music Report", known from 1987 onwards as the "Australian Music Report".

#	Title	Artist	Highest pos. reached	Weeks at No. 1
1.	The Sound of Music	Original Soundtrack Recording	1	76 (pkd #1 1965, 66 & 67)
2.	Going Places	Herb Alpert and the Tijuana Brass	1	17 (pkd #1 in 1967)
3.	Rubber Soul	The Beatles	1	11
4.	Whipped Cream & Other Delights	Herb Alpert's Tijuana Brass	3	
5.	Help!	The Beatles	1	11 (pkd #1 in 1965 & 66)
6.	Revolver	The Beatles	1	3
7.	It's 2 Easy	The Easybeats	3	
8.	The Most of the Animals	The Animals	3	
9.	What Now My Love	Herb Alpert & the Tijuana Brass	1	1
10.	Aftermath	The Rolling Stones	2	
11.	Animalisms	The Animals	4	
12.	Mary Poppins	Soundtrack	2	
13.	Doctor Zhivago	Soundtrack	7	
14.	The Best of Billy Thorpe	Billy Thorpe	4	
15.	Don't You Dig this Kind of Beat	Billy Thorpe and the Aztecs	3	
16.	Blonde on Blonde	Bob Dylan	4	
17.	Oliver!	Original London Cast Recording	7	
18.	Normie Rowe a Go Go	Normie Rowe	3	
19.	Out of Our Heads	The Rolling Stones	2	
20.	Zorba the Greek	Soundtrack	3	
21.	Volume 3	The Easybeats	7	
22.	A Man and His Music	Frank Sinatra	4	
23.	Young Johnny	Johnny Young	2	
24.	Great Scott It's Sandy	Sandy Scott	4	
25.	My Name Is Barbra, Two...	Barbra Streisand	5	

These charts are calculated by David Kent of the Kent Music Report and they are based on the number of weeks and position the records reach within the top 100 albums for each week.
