= List of top 25 singles for 1963 in Australia =

Top 25 singles of 1963 < 1962 1964 >

Other Australian top charts for 1963
- top 25 albums

Australian number-one charts of 1963
- albums
- singles

The following lists the top 25 (end of year) charting singles on the Australian Singles Charts, for the year of 1963. These were the best charting singles in Australia for 1963. The source for this year is the "Kent Music Report", known from 1987 onwards as the "Australian Music Report".

#	Title	Artist	Highest pos. reached	Weeks at No. 1
1.	"I Want To Hold Your Hand"	The Beatles	1	7 (pkd #1 in 1963 & 64)
2.	"She Loves You"	The Beatles	3	
3.	"Tamoure"	Bill Justis	1	4
4.	"From a Jack to a King"	Ned Miller	1	2
5.	"Pipeline"	Chantays	1	4
6.	"Hey Paula"	Paul and Paula	1	3
7.	"Sugar Shack"	Jimmy Gilmer and the Fireballs	1	3
8.	"I Will Follow Him"	Little Peggy March	1	2
9.	"Return to Sender"	Elvis Presley	1	3
10.	"Move Baby Move" / "You'll Never Cherish a Love So True"	Johnny O'Keefe	1	2
11.	"55 Days At Peking"	Rob E.G.	1	4
12.	"Dance On"	Kathy Kirby	1	3
13.	"Bombora"	The Atlantics	1	2
14.	"In Dreams"	Roy Orbison	1	2
15.	"Big Girls Don't Cry"	The Four Seasons	1	1
16.	"You'll Never Walk Alone"	Gerry & the Pacemakers	1	2
17.	"Painted Tainted Rose"	Al Martino	3	
18.	"The Boys"	The Shadows	1	2
19.	"Sukiyaki"	Kyu Sakamoto	1	2
20.	"No Trespassing" / "Not Responsible"	Helen Shapiro	1	2
21.	"Blue Bayou" / "Mean Woman Blues"	Roy Orbison	1	2
22.	"Surf City"	Jan and Dean	1	1
23.	"Wipe Out" / "Surfer Joe"	The Surfaris	3	
24.	"Secret Love"	Kathy Kirby	2	
25.	"Summer Holiday" / "Dancing Shoes"	Cliff Richard	3	

These charts are calculated by David Kent of the Kent Music Report and they are based on the number of weeks and position the records reach within the top 100 singles for each week.

source: David Kent's "Australian Chart Book 1940-1969"
