= The Seekers' Greatest Hits =

Greatest hits album by The Seekers
- Released: July 1968 (Australia)
- Recorded: 1964–67
- Genre: Folk, pop
- Label: EMI Music Australia, Columbia Records

The Seekers chronology
Live at the Talk of the Town (1968)	The Seekers' Greatest Hits (1968)	The Best of The Seekers (1968)

The Seekers' Greatest Hits is a compilation album released in Australia by EMI's Columbia label (Catalogue No. SCXO 7830) in July 1968 on the break-up of the Seekers. This album did not include "I'll Never Find Another You" or "A World of Our Own" which were previously released on The Seekers Sing Their Big Hits (1965) W&G 25/2512. The album peaked at number 1 for 17 weeks and was the highest selling album in Australia in 1968. It was also the first time an Australian artist had peaked at number 1 on the Australian album chart.

In October 2010, The Seekers' Greatest Hits, was listed in the book, 100 Best Australian Albums.

== Track listing ==
Side One

1. "Morningtown Ride" (Malvina Reynolds)
2. "The Carnival is Over" (Tom Springfield)
3. "Turn, Turn, Turn" (Pete Seeger)
4. "Walk With Me" (Springfield)
5. "When the Stars Begin to Fall" (Trad. Arr. The Seekers)
6. "Someday, One Day" (Simon)

Side Two

1. "On the Other Side" (Springfield-Osbourne-Sage)
2. "Georgy Girl" (Springfield, Jim Dale)
3. "When the Good Apples Fall" (Kenny Young)
4. "Myra" (The Seekers)
5. "Emerald City" (Kim Fowley, Keith Potger)
6. "Love Is Kind, Love Is Wine" (Woodley)

== Chart positions ==
=== Weekly charts ===
Year	Chart	Position
1968	Australian Kent Music Report Albums Chart	1

=== Year-end charts ===
Chart (1968)	Position
Australian Albums Chart	1
