= Introducing the Seekers Big Hits =

Compilation album by The Seekers
- Released: 1967
- Genre: Pop, Folk, World
- Label: W&G Records

The Seekers chronology
Come the Day (1966)	Introducing the Seekers Big Hits (1967)	Seekers Seen in Green (1967)

Introducing the Seekers Big Hits is the second compilation album by the Australian group The Seekers. The album was released in 1967 as a double LP. The album peaked at number 5 in Australia in 1967.

== Track listing ==
Side 1

1. "A World of Our Own"
2. "Sinner Man"
3. "Open Up Them Pearly Gates"
4. "Myra"
5. "With My Swag On My Shoulder"
6. "Waltzing Matilda"

Side 2

1. "Dese Bones G'wine Rise Again"
2. "When The Stars Begin to Fall"
3. "Run Come See"
4. "This Train"
5. "All My Trials"
6. "Just a Closer Walk with Thee"

Side 3

1. "Chilly Winds"
2. "Kumbaya"
3. "The Hammer Song"
4. "Wild Rover"
5. "Katy Cline"
6. "Lonesome Traveller"

Side 4

1. "I'll Never Find Another You"
2. "The Light From The Lighthouse"
3. "South Australia"
4. "Lemon Tree"
5. "The Wreck of the Old '97"
6. "Morningtown Ride"

== Weekly charts ==
Year	Chart	Position
1967	Australian Kent Music Report	5
