= List of top 25 singles for 1967 in Australia =

Top 25 singles of 1967 < 1966 1968 >

Other Australian top charts for 1967
- top 25 albums

Australian number-one charts of 1967
- albums
- singles

The following lists the top 25 (end of year) charting singles on the Australian Singles Charts, for the year of 1967. These were the best charting singles in Australia for 1967. The source for this year is the "Kent Music Report", known from 1987 onwards as the "Australian Music Report".

#	Title	Artist	Highest pos. reached	Weeks at No. 1
1.	"The Last Waltz"	Engelbert Humperdinck	1	9
2.	"This Is My Song"	Petula Clark	1	6
3.	"Snoopy Vs. The Red Baron"	The Royal Guardsmen	1	5
4.	"Green, Green Grass of Home"	Tom Jones	1	3
5.	"Penny Lane" / "Strawberry Fields Forever"	The Beatles	1	5
6.	"Somethin' Stupid"	Nancy Sinatra & Frank Sinatra	1	3
7.	"Georgy Girl"	The Seekers	1	1
8.	"All You Need Is Love" / "Baby, You're a Rich Man"	The Beatles	1	5
9.	"A Whiter Shade of Pale"	Procol Harum	1	3
10.	"I'm a Believer" / "(I'm Not Your) Stepping Stone"	The Monkees	1	1
11.	"It Must Be Him"	Vikki Carr	1	3
12.	"Up, Up and Away"	The 5th Dimension	2	2
13.	"San Francisco (Be Sure to Wear Flowers in Your Hair)"	Scott McKenzie	2	
14.	"Massachusetts"	Bee Gees	2	
15.	"Itchycoo Park"	Small Faces	2	
16.	"Don't Sleep in the Subway"	Petula Clark	1	2
17.	"Ruby Tuesday" / "Let's Spend the Night Together"	The Rolling Stones	3	
18.	"Snoopy's Christmas"	The Royal Guardsmen	1	2
19.	"The Two of Us"	Jackie Trent & Tony Hatch	3	
20.	"Release Me"	Engelbert Humperdinck	3	
21.	"Puppet on a String"	Sandie Shaw	2	
22.	The Monkees Vol 1 (EP)	The Monkees	3	
23.	"When I Was Young"	Eric Burdon and the Animals	2	
24.	"The Letter"	The Box Tops	4	
25.	"Dedicated to the One I Love"	The Mamas & the Papas	3	

These charts are calculated by David Kent of the Kent Music Report and they are based on the number of weeks and position the records reach within the top 100 singles for each week.

source: David Kent's "Australian Chart Book 1940-1969"
