= List of top 25 albums for 1967 in Australia =

Top 25 albums of 1967 < 1966 1968 >

Other Australian top charts for 1967
- top 25 singles

Australian number-one charts of 1967
- albums
- singles

The following lists the top 25 (end of year) charting albums on the Australian Album Charts, for the year of 1967. These were the best charting albums in Australia for 1967. The source for this year is the "Kent Music Report", known from 1987 onwards as the "Australian Music Report".

#	Title	Artist	Highest pos. reached	Weeks at No. 1
1.	Sgt. Peppers Lonely Hearts Club Band	The Beatles	1	30 (pkd #1in 1967 & 68)
2.	Going Places	Herb Alpert and the Tijuana Brass	1	17
3.	The Sound of Music	Original Soundtrack Recording	1	76 (pkd #1 in 1965, 66 & 67)
4.	The Monkees	The Monkees	3	
5.	The Most of the Animals	The Animals	3	
6.	Fiddler on the Roof	Original Broadway Cast	4	
7.	Thoroughly Modern Millie	Soundtrack	3	
8.	S.R.O.	Herb Alpert & the Tijuana Brass	3	
9.	Trumpet a Go Go	James Last Band	3	
10.	Are You Experienced	Jimi Hendrix Experience	2	
11.	Young Johnny	Johnny Young	2	
12.	Come the Day	The Seekers	7	
13.	More of the Monkees	The Monkees	4	
14.	Doctor Zhivago	Maurice Jarre	7	
15.	Great Scott It's Sandy	Sandy Scott	4	
16.	The Seekers Sing Their Big Hits	The Seekers	3	
17.	Green, Green Grass of Home	Tom Jones	7	
18.	Big Hits (High Tide and Green Grass)	Rolling Stones	7	
19.	Whipped Cream & Other Delights	Herb Alpert's Tijuana Brass	3	
20.	The Best of the Easybeats + Pretty Girl	The Easybeats	3	
21.	Between the Buttons	Rolling Stones	7	
22.	The Best of Peter, Paul and Mary	Peter, Paul and Mary	4	
23.	Jigsaw	The Shadows	7	
24.	26 Groovy Greats	Various Artists	7	
25.	Normie's Hit Happenings	Normie Rowe	7	

These charts are calculated by David Kent of the Kent Music Report and they are based on the number of weeks and position the records reach within the top 100 albums for each week.

source: David Kent's "Australian Chart Book 1940-1969"
