= The Henchmen =

Australian rock band

- Years active: 1964-1968
- Members: Doug Osbourne; Duncan MacKellar; David Mann; Del Smeeton; Malcolm Payne; Kevin Thompson; Rick Diamond; Barry Roy; Roger Forward; Sperri Goupetta; Chris Riddell

The Henchmen is an Australian rock band who had chart success with their singles "Rockin' Robin"/"Baby What's Wrong?" and "Can't You Hear Me Callin?"/"Easy Money" with the former selling 18,000 copies. Previously called Kevin Thompson and the Pacifics they won a record contract at a Battle of the Bands contest.
