= The Vibrants =

Australian pop rock group (1962–1971)

- Also known as: Bobby James and the Vibrants
- Origin: Adelaide, South Australia, Australia
- Genres: Pop rock; soul/R&B
- Years active: 1962–1971
- Label: EMI
- Past members: Bobby James; Jeff Gurr; Brenton Hay; Rick Kent; Terry Osmond; Terry Radford; Geoff Skewes; John Perry; Mike Wade; Bill Pfeifer; John Hossen; Mick Hamilton; Marc Leon; Barry Rogers; Penny Parsons; Bob Flinn; Phil Parli; Peter Day; John Vallins; Ken Leroy; Edgell James; Peter Mackay; Julie Oliver; Buddy England; Larry Brittain

The Vibrants were an Australian pop rock group that started as Bobby James and the Vibrants in Adelaide in 1962. James, their lead vocalist, left in 1965 to form the Bobby James Syndicate. As the Vibrants, two of their singles peaked in Go-Set Australian National Charts top 20: their cover versions of "Something About You Baby" (January 1967) and "My Prayer" (September). At the end of 1973the Vibrants disbanded.

== History ==
The Vibrants formed in 1962 in Adelaide as the backing group for pop singer, Bobby James, with the line-up of Jeff Gurr on bass guitar, Brenton Hay on saxophone, Rick Kent on drums, Terry Osmond on guitar, Terry Radford on guitar and Geoff Skewes on organ. That group released a single, "Jezebel", in 1965 via EMI's Columbia imprint. They had recorded another track, "I've Learned", which Australian musicologist, Ian McFarlane described as, "an R&B rave-up in the Missing Link mould."

Aside from James they also backed visiting rock 'n' roll singer, Johnny O'Keefe, or local pop vocalist, Bev Harrell, at suburban dances. In May 1965, without James, they released an instrumental single, "Furry Legs", which McFarlane felt was, "[a] parody of Beethoven's famous classical piece Für Elise." James left the group and, after moving to Melbourne in early 1966, formed the Bobby James Syndicate.

Kent and Skewes continued with the Vibrants and, in April 1966, they were joined by John Hossen on saxophone, John Perry on lead vocals, Billy Pfeifer on bass guitar and Mike Wade on guitar. They took up a weekly residency at Adelaide's KT club backing May Scott. The group relocated to Melbourne in July of that year, where Wade was replaced on guitar by Mick Hamilton (ex-the Moods). They were signed to EMI's Columbia imprint. Their first single for that label, "I've Got to Go" (September 1966), did not chart.

The next single was a cover of the Four Tops' "Something About You, Baby" (January 1967), which reached No. 17 on the Go-Set Australian National Charts top 40. It is one of their best known tracks, and has been anthologised on compilation albums of Australian 1960s pop music. It was followed by their cover of Joe Tex' "The Letter Song" (June 1967), which did not chart nationally. In September they issued a double-sided single, "My Prayer" / "Don't Let Your Left Hand Know", which peaked at No. 5. They appeared on several overseas show, including supporting Herb Alpert And The Tijuana Brass in Melbourne in 1967.

Perry was replaced by Marc Leon (ex-Impulse) on vocals in February 1968, and Barry Rogers took over bass guitar from Pfeiffer. The group's next single, a cover of the Bee Gees' "Terrible Way to Treat Your Baby", appeared in March. It sold only moderately in Adelaide and Melbourne. In 2005 chart researcher, David Kent, determined that it reached the equivalent of No. 51 on the Kent Music Report.

In October 1968 a major split occurred when Leon, Hossen and Rogers left to form a new group, the Graduate. Hamilton, Kent and Skewes formed a new version of the Vibrants with Edgell James, (ex Changing Times, Mixtures). They reformed once more with Bob Flinn on bass guitar, Peter Mackay, (ex Harts) on drums, and Penny Parsons on vocals. They released two singles on the Air label, "I Can't Let Go of Your Love" (July 1970), which peaked at No. 41 on the Go-Set Top 60, and "Give Me Just a Little More Time" (1971). Barry Rogers returned, followed by Peter Day, (ex Brisbane Avengers), Ken Leroy (ex-John Rupert Group, Kinetics), John Vallins (ex Kinetics) and Phil Parli, all on bass, and Trevor Courtney (ex-Chants R&B, Cam-Pact) replaced Mackay on drums. Another reformation occurred when Buddy England and Julie Oliver joined, replacing Skewes, leaving Hamilton the only member from the group’s hit making line-up. He left in March 1973, to be replaced by Steve Groves, (ex Kinetics). At the end of 1973 the group disbanded.

In 1972 Courtney and Skewes founded Skylight with Mike Clarke on bass guitar and guitar, Greg Cook (ex-Cam-Pact) on guitar, Sunil de Silva on percussion and Bonnie Lever on vocals. Courtney briefly joined Stylus. Skewes was later a talent manager and represented country rockers, Stars.

== Discography ==
=== Singles ===
Year	Single	Australia Chart Positions	
Year	Single	Go-Set	KMR
1965	"Jezebel"	–	–
1965	"Furry Legs"	–	–
1966	"I've Got to Go"	–	–
1967	"Something About You, Baby"	17	15
1967	"The Letter Song"	–	65
1967	"My Prayer" / "Don't Let Your Left Hand Know"	5	10
1968	"Terrible Way to Treat Your Baby"	–	51
1970	"I Can't Let Go of Your Love"	41	55
1971	"Give Me Just a Little More Time"	–	–

== Awards ==
=== South Australian Music Awards ===
The South Australian Music Awards are annual awards that exist to recognise, promote and celebrate excellence in the South Australian contemporary music industry. They commenced in 2012. The South Australian Music Hall of Fame celebrates the careers of successful music industry personalities.

Year	Nominee / work	Award	Result	Ref.
2017	The Vibrants	Hall of Fame	inductee	
