= Bev Harrell =

Australian pop singer

Bev Harrell OAM
- Born: Beverley Anne Harrell; 24 October 1946 (age 80); North Adelaide, South Australia
- Genres: pop, musical theatre
- Occupation: Singer
- Instrument: Vocals
- Years active: 1951–present
- Labels: EMI Music Australia; Columbia; Bell; Polydor; RCA
- Formerly of: The Vibrants, The Clefs

Beverley Anne Harrell, OAM (born 24 October 1946) is an Australian pop singer and musical theatre performer, most famous for her 1966 Australian hit "What Am I Doing Here with You?".

== Biography ==
Harrell was born on 24 October 1946 in North Adelaide to Reg Harrell, a carpenter, and Dot (née Borlace), an amateur musician. She sang for the 5AD children's radio show Kangaroos on Parade at the age of six. She appeared on Australia's Amateur Hour at the age of nine, coming second. At the age of twelve she came second on the radio/television show Swallow's Juniors; she also toured with the Mickey Mouse Club when they were in Australia, along with Lucky Starr.

In 1965, while working as a secretary and studying at night school, she began performing with local bands such as the Harts and the Vibrants, before briefly joining the Clefs; she was managed by her best friend Darryl Sambell (who would later go on to manage a young John Farnham) and later Ron Tremaine. She signed with the EMI record label and became a regular performer on television shows such as Bandstand, Kommotion, and Uptight.

Her first single, released in late 1966 under EMI Music Australia, "What Am I Doing Here with You?" written by P. F. Sloan and Steve Barri, was a cover version of Johnny Rivers's album track from In Action (1964). Her version, which was paired with the B-side "You Really Didn't Mean It", peaked at No. 13 on the Go-Set National Top 40 in 1967 and #1 in her native Adelaide. The success of the single led to her winning the Major Broadcasting Network's 1966 award for Best Female Recording Artist. Shortly after the release of the single, she began performing as a support act for such artists as Herb Alpert & the Tijuana Brass, Winifred Atwell, the Rolling Stones, and Roy Orbison, along with appearing in an advertisement for Hills Hoist clothes lines.

In 1967 she released an EP, Come On Over To Bev's Place, and an album, This is Bev, which was named Album of the Year at the Major Broadcasting Networks awards. Two of her seven subsequent singles released between 1967 and 1970 for EMI and its Columbia imprint charted in the top 40 in Australia, and were her last singles to do so: "Come On Over To Our Place"/"You Don't Love Me" (March 1967) and "One in a Million"/"Give Me Time" (February 1968). "Come On Over to Our Place", written by Barry Mann and Cynthia Weil, was also recorded by the Drifters, while "One in a Million" was written by Jackie Trent and Tony Hatch, frequent collaborators with Petula Clark, who subsequently released the song on her album Petula. In 1967 and 1970 she went to Vietnam to perform for troops in the Vietnam War. She was named three times as the most popular Australian female vocalist in the pop magazine Go-Set, coming 2nd in 1967, 1st in 1968, and 3rd in 1969. She was known for her small stature, being 1.45 metres (4 ft 9 in) tall.

Between 1970 and 1972 she toured around the world, travelling to Europe, Canada, the Caribbean, South Africa, and South East Asia. During this period, she had her own television show Two New in Toronto and released two singles. Her first was "Back To The People"/"Travelling Easy" (Bell); the A-side was written by Maurice Gibb and Billy Lawrie, Lulu's brother, and the single was produced by Gibb. Representing the United Kingdom, she sang "Bringing Back Those Memories" at the 1971 World Popular Song Festival, where she won the awards for Best Performance and Best Composition; it was released as a single in Japan as "Bringing Back Those Memories"/"Sing" (Polydor). In 1972 she returned to Adelaide. She released three singles with RCA in 1973 and 1974, along with an album, I Believe in Music (1974).

In 1989 and 1990 she performed the role of Grizabella in the musical Cats in Australia and New Zealand. She has continued to perform on stage and for clubs, corporate functions, and cruiseships into the 21st century. She has been married twice, to Brian Braidwood, a talent manager, and Gary Grant, a singer.

At the 2006 Australia Day Honours, she received a Medal of the Order of Australia "For service to the entertainment industry as a singer and to the community in the support of ex-service welfare organisations". In 2014, she was inducted into the South Australian Music Hall Of Fame.

== Discography ==
=== Albums ===
Title	Details
This is Bev	Released: 1967; Label: EMI Music Australia (OCLP-7663)
I Believe in Music	Released: 1974; Label: RCA (MVPL-0017)

=== Extended plays ===
Title	Details
Come on Over to Bev's Place	Released: 1966; Label: EMI Music Australia (7EGO 70078)

=== Singles ===
- "What Am I Doing Here with You"/"You Really Didn't Mean It" (1966), EMI Music Australia
- "Come on Over to Our Place"/"You Don't Love Me No More" (1967), EMI Music Australia
- "You Baby"/"You Are the Love of My Life" (1967), EMI Music Australia
- "One in a Million"/"Give me Time" (1968), Columbia
- "Mon Pere"/"At Times Like These, Mama" (1968), Columbia
- "One Way Ticket"/"I Am the World" (1968), Columbia
- "Everybody Needs Love"/"My Little One" (1969), Columbia
- "The Looking Glass"/"Yes I'm Ready" (1970), Columbia
- "Back to the People"/"Travelling Easy" (1971), Bell
- "Bringing Back Those Memories"/"Sing" (Polydor, 1971/1972)
- "It was Easy"/""The Right Thing to Do" (1973), RCA
- "Carols By Candlelight"/"You've Got To Save Me" (1973), Columbia
- "Mon Pere"/"I Believe in Music" (1974), Columbia

== Awards and nominations ==
=== Go-Set Pop Poll ===
The Go-Set Pop Poll was coordinated by teen-oriented pop music newspaper, Go-Set and was established in February 1966 and conducted an annual poll during 1966 to 1972 of its readers to determine the most popular personalities.

Year	Nominee / work	Award	Result
1967	herself	Female Vocal	2nd
1968	herself	Female Vocal	1st
1969	herself	Female Vocal	3rd

=== South Australian Music Awards ===
The South Australian Music Awards is coordinated by Music SA, a non-profit organisation whose aims are to promote, support and develop contemporary music in South Australia.

Year	Nominee / work	Award	Result
2014	herself	ARIA Hall of Fame	inductee
