= Dear One (Larry Finnegan song) =

Single by Larry Finnegan
- B-side: "Candy Lips"
- Released: December 1961
- Genre: Pop
- Length: 2:58
- Label: Old Town 1113
- Songwriters: Larry Finnegan, Vincent Finneran
- Producer: Hy Weiss

Larry Finnegan singles chronology
"Dear One" (1961)	"Pretty Suzy Sunshine" (1962)

"Dear One" is a song written by Larry Finnegan and Vincent Finneran and performed by Finnegan. It reached #1 in Australia and #11 in the United States in 1962.

The song was produced by Old Town Records owner Hy Weiss.

The song ranked #17 on Australia's Top 25 songs of 1962 and #79 on Billboard magazine's Top 100 songs of 1962.

Finnegan released a follow-up record to the song, "Dear One, Part Two", as a single in April 1964, but it did not chart.

In the mid-60s, Finnegan moved to Sweden where he started his own record label, Svensk-American. In Sweden he had more hits (Good Morning Tears etc). He also sang songs in Swedish (Maria min vän and Hälsa hem till mamma in 1967). One of Sweden's most popular groups Sven-Ingvars was on his label in 1966 and 1967.

== Other versions ==
- Darrell McCall released a version of the song as a single in 1962.
- Rex Gildo released a version of the song as a single in Germany in 1965 entitled "Leider, Leider".
- Rauli Badding Somerjoki released a version of the song as a single in Finland in 1982 entitled "Rakas Lurjus".
