= The Joy Boys =

Australian musical group

- Origin: Australia
- Genres: Rock
- Years active: 1957-1966
- Past members: Kevin Jacobson; Keith Jacobson; Norm Day; Laurie Irwin; John Bogie; Ron Patten; Bruce Gurr; Dave Bridge

The Joy Boys are an Australian instrumental group. They performed on their own and as a backing band for Col Joye. They had chart success with releases such as top ten singles "Smokey Mokes" (1961) and "Southern 'Rora" (1962).

== Members ==
- Kevin Jacobson - piano
- Keith Jacobson - bass
- Norm Day - guitar
- John Bogie - drums
- Laurie Irwin - sax/clarinet
- Ron Patten - sax
- Bruce Gurr - keyboards
- Dave Bridge - guitar
- Rex Blair - drums

== Discography ==
- Col Joye’s Joy Boys (1961) - Festival
- New Old Time (1962) - Festival
- The Joy Boys Fabulous Hits (1962) - Festival
- Cookin' up a Party (1963) - Festival
- The Surfin' Stompin Joys (1964) - Festival
