= The Seekers Sing Their Big Hits =

Compilation album by The Seekers
- Released: 1965
- Genre: Pop, folk, World
- Label: W&G Records
- Producer: The Seekers

The Seekers chronology
| A World of Our Own (1965) | The Seekers Sing Their Big Hits (1965) | Come the Day (1966) |

'The Seekers Sing Their Big Hits is the first compilation album by the Australian group The Seekers. The album was released in 1965 and includes tracks from their four studio albums to-date. The album peaked at number 3 and was the 16th biggest selling album in Australia in 1967.

== Track listing ==
Side 1

1. "A World of Our Own" (Tom Springfield) - 2:38
2. "Sinner Man" (Traditional; arranged by The Seekers, piano arranged by Chris Langdon)
3. "Open Up Them Pearly Gates" (Traditional; arranged by The Seekers)
4. "Myra" (Athol Guy, Bruce Woodley, Judith Durham, Keith Potger)
5. "With My Swag On My Shoulder" (Athol Guy, Bruce Woodley, Judith Durham, Keith Potger)
6. "Waltzing Matilda" (Banjo Paterson, lyrics: Marie Cowan)

Side 2

1. "I'll Never Find Another You" (Tom Springfield)
2. "The Light from the Lighthouse" (Traditional; arranged by The Seekers)
3. "South Australia" (Traditional; arranged by The Seekers)
4. "Lemon Tree" (Will Holt)
5. "The Wreck of the Old 97" (Traditional; arranged by The Seekers)
6. "Morningtown Ride" (arranged by Malvina Reynolds)

== Charts ==
=== Weekly charts ===
| Year | Chart | Position |
|---|---|---|
| 1965-1967 | Australian Kent Music Report | 3 |

=== Year-end charts ===
| Chart (1967) | Position |
|---|---|
| Australian Albums Chart | 16 |
