= Larry Finnegan =

American singer

John Lawrence Finneran (August 10, 1938 – July 22, 1973), better known under his stage name Larry Finnegan (sometimes erroneously listed as "Larry Finneran"), was an American pop singer.

Born in New York City, Finnegan's only hit in the US was 1962's "Dear One", which went to No. 11 on the U.S. Billboard Hot 100, and climbed to No. 1 in Australia. The recording had sold one million copies by 1966, earning a gold disc.

In 1966 Finnegan moved to Sweden, where Dear One was a No. 1 hit in 1962 and he had more hits, for example "Oh, Lonesome me (No. 9), "Pretty Suzie Sunshine (No. 7) and "I like it like that" (No. 5).

Due to his great successes in Sweden, Finnegan visited the country for tours and became involved in the Swedish pop industry. The first result came already in 1963 when the Swedish-Dutch singer Suzie (Martina Carina Peereboom) got her first hit with "Johnny Loves me" - written and produced by him. The record spent 10 weeks at the best selling chart Kvällstoppen and peaked at No. 7. Her German version Johnny komm became a hit in Germany. In Nederland she had a hit with his song De wereld is leeg zonder jou 1966.

Larry Finnegan also made records of his songs in German, among others Komm doch zu mir, Tiger aus Papier, Sieben Tage, Einen Grüss an Mama, Glück und heisser Tränen, Unterm Dach and Das schönste Mädchen der Welt.

In 1966, he started his own record label SvenskAmerican, which published his own records – for example the singles "Good Morning Tears", (No. 7) and "Bound for Houston (No. 12) "Seven Days" (No. 4) – and also records with the Swedish group Sven-Ingvars. He produced several of the group's hits, the most successful was Vid din sida (By your side), number one for three weeks in December 1966 on the best selling chart Kvällstoppen .

Finnegan recorded several records in Swedish. The most successful was "Maria, min vän" (Maria, my friend), which spent 15 weeks at the best selling chart Kvällstoppen peaking at No. 1 and "Hälsa hem till mamma" (Send your greetings to my mama), which peaked at No. 6. His Swedish pronunciation was as good as perfect, without any American accent.

He also wrote songs which became big hits for Swedish artists, for example "Skona mitt hjärta" (Spare My Heart), Pick up the pieces in Finnegan's original version, performed by Siw Malmkvist (which peaked at No. 6 and also is her best selling record in Norway rendering her a Norwegian silver disc) and "Världens rikaste flicka" (The Richest Girl In The World) and "Tack för alla kyssar" (Thanks For All The Kisses), both with Yvonne Norrman, a popular Swedish artist he had signed for his record company Svensk-American. "Tack för alla kyssar" is a long-lived success with several new versions, for example Schytts (1973) Thorleifs (1982), Flamingokvintetten (1984), Rose-Maries (1994), Stig Lorentz (2014), Tommy Karlsson (2020), the Finnish danceband Dansdax (2022) and Mister Peo (2025).

His Pick up the pieces gave the Danish pop singer Bjørn Tidmand his big break in 1963, Brænd Mine Breve (Burn my letters), which peaked at No. 1. A Finnish version of the same song, Jätä minut jo rauhaan (Leave me alone) was a hit with the Finnish pop singer Marion Rung. Larry Finnegan's songs have been recorded by many artists mainly in Scandinavia, Germany and the Netherlands. His discography includes 160 different versions:

Finnegan moved later to Switzerland, and in 1970 back to the United States.

He died of a brain tumor at age 34 in 1973.

== Discography ==
=== Singles ===
Year	Title	Peak chart positions		Record Label	B-side
Year	Title	US	AUS	Record Label	B-side
1961	"Dear One"	11	1	Old Town Records	"Candy Lips"
1962	"Pretty Suzy Sunshine"	–	–	Old Town Records	"It's Walkin' Talkin' Time"
1962	"Oh Lonesome Me"	–	–	Old Town Records	"Knock on Wood"
1962	"I'll Be Back, Jack"	–	–	Coral Records	"There Ain't Nothin' in This World"
1963	"A Kiss and a Dozen Roses"	–	–	Old Town Records	"Pick Up the Pieces"
1964	"Dear One, Part Two"	–	–	RIC Records	"Baton Rouge"
1964	"A Tribute to Ringo Starr – The Other Ringo"	130	–	RIC Records	"When My Love Passes By"
