= Ray Brown & the Whispers =

Australian rock band

- Origin: Sydney, New South Wales, Australia
- Genres: Rock; pop
- Years active: 1964–1967
- Label: Leedon
- Spinoffs: Ray Brown & the New Whispers; Ray Brown Three; Ray Brown & Moonstone
- Spinoff of: The Nocturnes
- Past members: Ray Brown; Lawrie Barclay; Pat Jeffery; John Manners; Bobbie Richardson; Al Jackson

Ray Brown & the Whispers were an Australian rock band from 1964 to 1967. Led by singer Ray Brown (1945–1996), with Lawrie Barclay on rhythm guitar, Al Jackson on lead guitar, Pat Jeffery on drums and John Manners on bass guitar. The group issued four albums, Ray Brown & the Whispers (1965), Hits & Brass (1965), Heading for the Top (1966) and Dance Dance Dance (1966). Their top 5 singles were the cover versions, "Pride", "Fool, Fool, Fool" (both 1965), "In the Midnight Hour" and "Tennessee Waltz Song" (both 1966). Their last single for 1966, "Too Late to Come Home" had the Bee Gees on backing vocals. Brown left the band before year's end and continued as both a solo artist and leader of new groups. The Whispers broke up in 1967. Brown died of a heart attack on 16 August 1996, aged 51. Manners died 5 November 2018, aged 77.

== History ==
Ray Brown & the Whispers were formed in 1964 in Sydney as a rock and pop band by Lawrie Barclay on rhythm guitar, Ray Brown on lead vocals, Pat Jeffrey on drums, John Manners on bass guitar and Bobbie Richardson on lead guitar. Barclay, Jeffrey, Manners and Richardson had been members of the Shadows-inspired instrumental group, the Nocturnes, formed in 1962. The Nocturnes had issued two instrumental singles, "Riptide" (1963) and "Sitting Pretty" (1964). Brown had been a clerk with the Customs Department prior to joining the Nocturnes, which changed their name to the Whispers.

Late in 1964 the group took up residency at Surf City discotheque in King's Cross. Also in that year they played at the Bowl, a Sydney nightclub, doing covers of popular songs such as "Shakin All Over". Their debut single, "20 Miles", appeared in January 1965. It was co-written by Bernie Lowe and Kal Mann for Chubby Checker in 1963. By the time the single appeared Richardson had been replaced by Al Jackson on lead guitar. Their talent manager was John Harrigan. "20 Miles" reached No. 1 in Sydney and Perth, No. 2 in Brisbane, No. 3 in Adelaide and No. 25 in Melbourne. According to Kent Music Report's retro-active Australian Chart Book 1940–1969 (2005) this is equivalent to No. 11 nationally.

Their next single, "Pride" (April 1965), was a cover version of Brent Edwards' 1963 song (also covered by Billy J. Kramer & the Dakotas on their album, Listen [1963]). Overall it reached No. 3 nationally. They followed with "Fool, Fool, Fool" in July, originally recorded by Roosevelt "Rosey" Grier in 1964. Ray Brown & the Whispers' rendition reached No. 3 nationally. The group issued an eponymous album in 1965, which reached No. 4 on the Kent Music Report's albums chart. A fifth single, "In the Midnight Hour", appeared in October, which reached No. 4. Originally by Wilson Pickett in June 1965. Their second album, Hits and Brass, followed late in the year, which compiled their popular singles on one side and "five new, brass-laden songs" on the other side.

In February 1966 they provided their rendition of "Tennessee Waltz Song", first released by Pee Wee King in 1948, which reached No. 4. The Uniques' "Strange" (1966) was released by Ray Brown & the Whispers as "Ain't It Strange" in September. They released two more albums, Heading for the Top (No. 4) and Dance Dance Dance both in 1966. Their final single for the year, "Too Late to Come Home" (October), featured backing vocals by Bee Gees. Ray Brown was listed at No. 10 on teenage pop music newspaper, Go-Set's popularity poll for Male Vocal in October 1966.

During 1966 Brown had "decided to take control of his career, and fought a management contract," consequently he left the group at the end of that year. The Whispers continued with Bobby Thomas on lead vocals but broke up in 1967. Australian music journalist, Stuart Coupe, observed, "One of Australia's more legendary '60s groups, who used to attract more than 2000 fans to their shows at Surf City and the Beach House during the early to mid '60s."

Brown formed Ray Brown & the New Whispers early in 1967 with Steve Hardy on drums, Ronnie Peel on bass guitar (ex-the Missing Links, the Pleazers) and Dave Russell on guitar (ex-Ray Columbus & the Invaders). They issued an album, Same Old Song ... Brand New Beat (1967), it provided the single, "The Same Old Song" (originally by Four Tops in 1965) in March 1967, which reached No. 12. However, Brown had "lost time, focus, and some of his initial appeal to fans" due to his struggle with previous management. The group became Ray Brown Three in mid-year after Russell left and Brown took up guitar.

Brown relocated to the United States in late 1967 for two years. He was signed to Capitol Records, which issued his solo album, Just Ray Brown, in 1969. Upon return to Australia he formed Moonstone, with Mal Clarke on guitar (ex-Tony Worsley and the Fabulous Blue Jays) and Jimmy Doyle on guitar (ex-Aesop's Fables). They issued an album, Mad House (October 1969), which provided "an esoteric blending of country, folk, psychedelia and Eastern influences." Other musicians on the album were John Carr on guitar and bass guitar, Pee Wee Clark on pedal steel guitar, Russell Hinton on guitar, Ed Gaston on bass guitar, Eligio Sincic on sitar and tablas, and Jimmy Thompson on drums (ex-Billy Thorpe and the Aztecs).

Ray Brown (born 15 February 1945) died of a heart attack in Sydney on 16 August 1996, aged 51.

== Members ==
- Ray Brown – vocals (1964–1966)
- Lawrie Barclay – rhythm guitar (1964–1967)
- Pat Jeffery – drums (1964–1967)
- John Manners – bass guitar (1964–1967)
- Bobbie Richardson – lead guitar (1964)
- Al Jackson – lead guitar (1965–1967)

== Discography ==
=== Albums ===
- Ray Brown & the Whispers (1965) – Leedon Records (LL-31646) Aus: No. 4
- Hits & Brass (1965)
- Heading for the Top (1966) Aus: No. 4
- Dance Dance Dance (1966)

=== Compilation albums ===
- Miles of Hits (1988)
- Ray Brown & the Whispers: The Ultimate Collection (2002)

=== Singles ===
Year	Single	Chart positions
Year	Single	AUS
1965	"20 Miles" / "Devoted to You"^{[A]}	11
1965	"Pride" / "Say It Again"^{[A]}	3
1965	"Fool Fool Fool" / "Go to Him"	3
1966	"In the Midnight Hour" / "Now Is the Time"	4
1966	"Tennessee Waltz Song" / "I Am What I Am"^{[A]}	4
1966	"Ain't It Strange" / "I Can't Get Enough"^{[A]}	38
1966	"Too Late to Come Home" / "Respect"^{[A]}	55
1967	"The Same Old Song"^{[A]}^{[B]} / "New Kind of Love"^{[B]}	12

- A Charted as a double A-side.
- B Ray Brown & the New Whispers.
