= Hidden Treasures =

Hidden Treasures may refer to:

- Hidden Treasures (TV series), a TVB modern drama series

== Music ==
- Hidden Treasures (EP), a 1995 EP by Megadeth
- Hidden Treasures (Kingston Trio album), re-released as Treasure Chest
- Hidden Treasures (Stroke 9 album), 2004
- Hidden Treasures, a trilogy of compilation albums by The Seekers
  - Hidden Treasures – Volume 1 (2020)
  - Hidden Treasures – Volume 2 (2020)
- Hidden Treasures, a 1993 album by Barry Manilow
- Hidden Treasures, a 2011 album by Dave Davies; see A Hole in the Sock of (Dave Davies) § Hidden Treasures

== See also ==
- Hidden Treasures of Taj Mahal, a compilation album by American blues artist Taj Mahal
- Hidden Treasure (disambiguation)
