= Buddy England =

British-born Australian singer-songwriter

Buddy England is a British-born Australian singer and songwriter.

== Career ==
As a solo artist from 1963 to 1969, England released several singles on His Master's Voice, including "If You'll Stay", "Doll House", "There Goes My Baby", "Movin' Man", "Sunny", "I'm Going For You", and "If I Never Get To Love You". "Movin' Man" was used in an advertisement for Gilbey's gin.

From 1967 to 1979, England returned to the UK and continued writing and recording for EMI at Abbey Road, releasing several singles, including "Forgive and Forget", "The Name of My Sorrow", "Wonderful World" and "In Need of a Friend". From 1970 to 1971, England owned and launched Air Records and produced all of its artists, including the Vibrants, Love Story, Tadpole, Mick Hamilton, the Tangerine Balloon and Tony Pantano.

England was a member of the Seekers in their new lineup from 1974 to 1981, replacing Bruce Woodley and recording their first album for Astor Records. He was also a member of the Mixtures from June 1969 to March 1970.

England still writes and records on his farm on the outskirts of Melbourne, Australia. In 1993 he released the album Fate's a Fiddler, Life's a Dance. The majority of album's material was written and produced by him.

== Discography ==
With The Mixtures

- In The Summertime (Fable, 1971)

With The Seekers

- The Seekers (Astor, 1975) AUS #17
- Giving and Taking (Astor, 1976) AUS #78, NZ #5
- A Little Bit of Country (Hammard, 1980) AUS #84

Solo

- Fate's a Fiddler, Life's a Dance (Larrikin, 1993)

=== Singles ===
| Year | Title | AU | Label |
|---|---|---|---|
| 1965 | "I've Come Of Age" | 65 | His Master's Voice |
| 1966 | "Doll House" | 68 | His Master's Voice |
| 1966 | "There Goes My Baby" | 92 | His Master's Voice |
| 1966 | "If You'll Stay" | 84 | His Master's Voice |
| 1966 | "If I Never Get To Love You" | 47 | His Master's Voice |
| 1967 | "Movin' Man" | 26 | His Master's Voice |
| 1967 | "I'm Goin' For You" | - | His Master's Voice |
| 1967 | "Forgive and Forget" | - | Columbia |
| 1970 | "Josephine" | - | Air |
| 1975 | "Carolina" | - | Astor |
| 1976 | "Where In The World" (with The Seekers) | 55 | Astor |
