= Don Dannemann =

American musician and songwriter (born 1944)

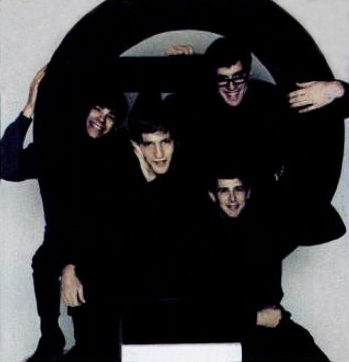
- The Cyrkle in 1967 Dannemann is in the bottom right

Background information
- Born: May 9, 1944 (age 82); Brooklyn, New York City, USA
- Genres: Pop; rock; psychedelic rock
- Occupations: musician, songwriter
- Instruments: Guitar, vocals
- Years active: 1961-2008, 2016-present
- Member of: The Cyrkle

Don Dannemann (born May 9, 1944) is an American musician and jingle writer. He is the lead vocalist and guitarist for The Cyrkle.

== Career ==
Dannemann formed The Rhondells in 1961 in Lafayette College, Pennsylvania. They signed to Brian Epstein in 1966, were renamed The Cyrkle by him (the unique spelling of the name being done by John Lennon) and released their highest-selling song "Red Rubber Ball" (written by Paul Simon and Bruce Woodley of the The Seekers) the same year. The song peaked at number 2 on the Billboard Hot 100. They were the only non-English band Epstein managed, and they toured with The Beatles during their final tour.

Also in 1966, the band briefly went on hiatus when Dannemann enlisted in the US Coast Guard. When he returned, he had a Buzz cut and was often seen on television and promotional photographs with this hairstyle. He was the main songwriter along with Tom Dawes. After another hit with "Turn-Down Day", they disbanded in 1968, and had already split up by the time the 1970 film The Minx, which they had recorded the soundtrack for, had been released.

In the 1970s, Dannemann and Cyrkle member Tom Dawes worked as professional Jingle writers. Dannemann wrote jingles for Continental Airlines and Swanson Foods, and also penned the "uncola" jingle for 7 Up. Dannemann spent the next few decades working in advertising, and in the 1970s, opened the jingle business "Mega-Music" in New York City. Dannemann retired in 2008 and moved out of NYC.

In the 2010s, original member Michael Losekamp successfully tracked down Don after over forty years. He had just joined a pop band called The Gas Pump Jockeys that covered songs from the 1960s that had incorporated Cyrkle songs into their setlist following his entry into the band, and asked Don if he wanted to join the band as rename to "The Cyrkle" to start touring again to celebrate 50 years since "Red Rubber Ball". As of 2024, Dannemann and Losekamp are touring the USA with the current version of The Cyrkle.

== See also ==
- Notable multi-neck guitar users
