= Red Rubber Ball (album) =

Studio album by the Cyrkle
- Released: June 30, 1966
- Recorded: February 12–June 1, 1966
- Genre: Pop rock
- Length: 27:55
- Label: Columbia
- Producer: John Simon

The Cyrkle chronology
| Red Rubber Ball (1966) | Neon (1967) |

Singles from Red Rubber Ball
- 1. "Red Rubber Ball"/"How Can I Leave Her" Released: April 4, 1966; 2. "Turn-Down Day"/"Big Little Woman" Released: July 21, 1966

Professional ratings
Review scores
| Source | Rating |
|---|---|
| AllMusic | 3/5 stars |

Red Rubber Ball is the debut album by the Cyrkle and was released on June 30, 1966 through Columbia Records CS 9344 (stereo) and CL 2544 (Mono). It reached #47 on the Billboard Top LPs chart.

The album featured two singles: "Red Rubber Ball", which reached #2 on the Billboard Hot 100, and "Turn-Down Day", which reached #16. The song "Money to Burn" was later featured as the B-side to their 1966 single "Please Don't Ever Leave Me".

AllMusic gives the album a 3-star rating.

== Track listing ==
=== Side 1 ===
1. "Red Rubber Ball" (Paul Simon, Bruce Woodley) – 2:17
2. "Why Can't You Give Me What I Want" (Stephen Friedland, Tom Dawes) – 2:27
3. "Baby, You're Free" (Bob Crewe, Gary Weston) – 2:42
4. "Big Little Woman" (Don Dannemann, Dawes) – 2:28
5. "Cloudy" (Simon, Woodley) – 2:15
6. "Cry" (Dannemann, Dawes) – 2:38

=== Side 2 ===
7. "Turn-Down Day" (Jerry Keller, David Blume) – 2:32
8. "There's a Fire in the Fireplace" (Friedland) – 2:24
9. "Bony Moronie" (Larry Williams) – 2:32
10. "How Can I Leave Her" (Dannemann, Dawes) – 2:35
11. "Money to Burn" (Dannemann, Dawes) – 3:05

A reissue on CD added bonus tracks including demo recordings.

== Personnel ==
Adapted from the album's liner notes.

The Cyrkle

- Don Dannemann – vocals (lead on tracks 1, 3, 5, 7, 8, 10, 11), beer-bottle guitar (track 6)
- Tom Dawes – guitar, sitar, harmonica, bass (track 8), castanets, vocals (lead on tracks 1, 2, 4, 7-11)
- Marty Fried – drums, vocals (lead on tracks 10 and 11), tongue clicking (track 5)

Additional personnel

- John Simon – calliope organ (track 1), acoustic piano (track 7), producer, arranger, conductor
- Earl Perkins - electric piano (track 7)
- Eddie Smith – engineer
- Gordy Clark – engineer
- Stanley Weiss – engineer
- The Cyrkle – arranger, conductor

== Charts ==
| Chart (1966) | Peak position |
|---|---|
| Billboard Top LPs | 47 |
| Cashbox Top 100 Albums | 32 |

Singles

| Year | Single | Chart | Position |
|---|---|---|---|
| 1966 | "Red Rubber Ball" | Billboard Hot 100 | 2 |
| 1966 | "Red Rubber Ball" | Cashbox | 3 |
| 1966 | "Red Rubber Ball" | Canada | 1 |
| 1966 | "Turn-Down Day" | Billboard Hot 100 | 16 |
| 1966 | "Turn-Down Day" | Cashbox | 18 |
| 1966 | "Turn-Down Day" | Canada | 16 |
