= Bruce Woodley =

Australian musician (born 1942)

Bruce Woodley AO
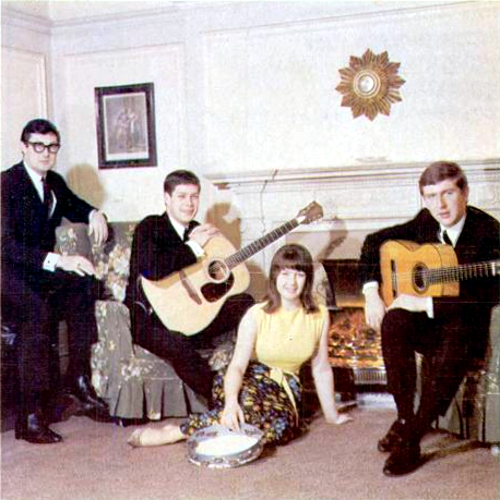
- The Seekers in 1965 – Woodley at right

Background information
- Born: Bruce William Woodley; 25 July 1942 (age 84); Melbourne, Victoria, Australia
- Genres: Jazz, folk-pop
- Occupations: Singer-songwriter, guitarist
- Instruments: Vocals, guitar, banjo
- Years active: 1959–present
- Formerly of: The Seekers

Bruce William Woodley (born 25 July 1942) is an Australian singer-songwriter and musician. He was a founding member of the successful folk-pop group the Seekers, and co-composer of the songs "I Am Australian," "Red Rubber Ball," and Simon & Garfunkel's "Cloudy."

== Early life ==
Bruce Woodley was born on 25 July 1942 in Melbourne, Victoria, Australia. He attended Melbourne High School with fellow Seekers, Athol Guy and Keith Potger.

== The Seekers ==
Woodley had a 'residency' performing at the Treble Clef restaurant in Prahran. With former schoolmates, Athol Guy and Keith Potger, he formed a folk music trio, The Escorts, in the early 1960s. Soon before the arrival of vocalist Judith Durham in 1962 they became The Seekers, and had some success in Australia before travelling to London in 1964 and recording four international hit singles written and produced by Tom Springfield. Woodley played guitar, banjo, and mandolin, as well as one of the four-part vocal harmony, and was the chief songwriter. While Durham sang the majority of lead vocals for the group, Woodley usually handled the male lead vocals, including a number of album tracks. The Seekers first disbanded in 1968.

== Work with Paul Simon ==
During 1965, while in London, Woodley met Paul Simon, following the poor performance of Wednesday Morning 3 A.M. and just prior to the success of Simon and Garfunkel's Sounds of Silence. Simon and Woodley co-wrote three songs: the million-selling "Red Rubber Ball"—later a Top Five hit for US group The Cyrkle.; "I Wish You Could Be Here," which The Cyrkle and The Seekers both recorded; and "Cloudy" which became an album track on Simon and Garfunkel's hit 1966 album Parsley, Sage, Rosemary and Thyme—the only Simon and Woodley song to appear on both Simon & Garfunkel and The Seekers' albums. However, Woodley's relationship with Simon had deteriorated and Woodley later struggled to get his share of the royalties—his songwriting credit on "Cloudy" was omitted from the release of Parsley, Sage, Rosemary and Thyme. Woodley and Simon stopped working together due to the mentioned royalty problems and creative differences, and the collaborations ended after that.

== Going Solo ==
Woodley's first solo venture was a production company called Pennywheel, which saw him release a number of products for children, including a "Build an Alphabet" set of blocks and the 1969 EP and board book, "Friday St. Fantasy". In 1969, Bruce headed off to America to sell songs he had been writing, and was to remain there for several years. During this period he collaborated with a number of writers including John Farrar and Australian folk singer Hans Poulsen.

== Seekers reunions ==
Woodley reunited with the Seekers, composed of fellow original members Athol Guy and Keith Potger, and 23-year-old Dutch-born Louisa Wisseling (a semi-professional folk singer formerly with Melbourne band The Settlers). In a February 1975 newspaper article about the group's reunion, Louisa revealed that Bruce had approached her at a 1974 Settlers concert at Ferntree Gully's Swagman Restaurant with an offer to join the group, and she originally turned him down. The new group recorded two albums and a number of singles, some of which, including "The Nimble Song" and "I Saw It All With Trans Tours" (both written by Woodley) reflected the boys' other careers in advertising. Woodley's composition "The Sparrow Song" became the group's biggest 1970s hit and remains to this day the highest-charting Seekers single written by a member of the group. Other tracks he contributed to this line-up included "Giving and Takin'" (the title track of their second album), "Can We Learn to Get Along" (which began life as a solo recording for the TV documentary series Shell's Australia, and was released by Bruce on flexi-disc), "Reunion", "Country Ros", "Standing on Shaky Ground" (featuring Bruce on vocals which he felt were too low for him, but were impossible for Louisa to sing for the same reason), and "The Rose and the Briar".

In 1977, Bruce left the group and was replaced by Buddy England. He continued to focus on song-writing and advertising, producing many TV jingle. His first, back in 1971 was a solo (advertising) single called "The ANZ Bank Travelling Man", and was given out free to employees of that institution as part of the promotion.

== I Am Australian ==
The year 1987 saw Woodley involved in the preparations for the Australian Bicentenary, and the release of an Australian-themed double album, songbook and cassette tape, featuring covers of traditional songs and some of Woodley's own compositions. The set was called I Am Australian, after a jingle that he wrote to tie together the various threads of the project, tapping into the need he perceived for a national song in which people could take pride. One of his colleagues on the project was Dobe Newton of The Bushwackers, who helped compose the words of the title song; another was noted folk singer Rose Bygrave. The recordings also featured a children's choir including Claire Woodley.

The following year he reunited with The Seekers, this time featuring Julie Anthony as the lead singer, to perform "The Carnival is Over" at Expo '88 and a musical about the Seekers' journey. This line-up released an album in 1989; "Live On", the title track, was composed by Woodley, as were many of the other new tracks like "The Streets of Serenade" (which charted the story of the Seekers rather more blatantly than his '70s composition "Reunion"), "One Step Forward, Two Steps Back", "How Can a Love So Wrong Be So Right" and "Taking My Chances With You". When Julie left to have a baby (daughter Tamara), former Young Talent Time singer Karen Knowles joined the group. The only studio recordings by this line-up are the Bruce Woodley written songs "Fools Tonight" and "Bright Star", sold as a cassingle at concerts. "Bright Star", originally written for Julie's voice, was also performed by both the Julie- and Karen-led Seekers at Carols by Candlelight.

When original lead singer Judith Durham returned to The Seekers fold in late 1992 for the group's 25 Year Silver Jubilee, the theme song and CD-Single of the reunion was Woodley's composition "Keep A Dream In Your Pocket". A 1993 live album and DVD followed, featuring many of the group's hits and a song which would become one of their best known, Woodley's "I Am Australian".

The success of "I Am Australian" took Woodley completely by surprise. In 1991, he performed it with Karen and the Australian Children's Choir on a televised drought appeal, featuring a new, drought-themed verse which has not appeared on other recordings. "I Am Australian" has featured in all Woodley's solo tours and all Seekers tours since the reunion with Judith Durham; in 2000 the Seekers performed a condensed version at the televised Australia Day concert. Many artists have covered the song; in 1997, Durham released a version with Russell Hitchcock and Mandawuy Yunupingu which entered the Australian charts. For many, it has become the unofficial anthem, and is a staple performed at many national events, by such artists as Jon Stevens, Delta Goodrem and naturally Bruce and the Seekers. At the 2001 celebrations for the Centenary of Federation, Woodley performed the song with daughter Claire (now known for performing the song solo at many events herself) and co-writer Dobe Newton.

He recorded a CD in 2001, along with Claire, called, once again, "I am Australian". He has since recorded an ANZAC themed version of "I am Australian", titled "The Anzac Song", and appeared on Melbourne radio advertising the release of a CD-Single several weeks before Anzac Day in 2005. Apparently due to production difficulties, it never eventuated. In 2005 Bruce was interviewed by music journalist Debbie Kruger for a new book entitled Songwriters Speak, focusing on influential and successful Australian singer-songwriters.

At the National Day of Mourning on 22 February 2009 for the victims of the Victoria bushfires, Woodley unveiled two new verses for "I am Australian".

== Other work ==
Woodley's non-musical work includes public speaking through the Saxton Speakers Bureau, and he is the patron of various organisations such as the NIYPAA (National Institute of Youth Performing Arts Australia). He is also a member of the Advisory Board of the organisation TLC for Kids, and was for a time, beginning in 1997, the chairman of the Victorian branch of the Variety Club. Woodley and his wife, Sally have two children, Claire and a son, Dan. Claire has collaborated with her father, several times.

== Notable performances ==
- 1965 – The Seekers won the Best New Group in the New Musical Express Poll Winners Awards and performed on 11 April at the Wembley Empire Pool, on a bill that included the Beatles, the Rolling Stones, Cliff Richard and Dusty Springfield. Archive footage from this show was included in the Seekers' 2014 50th anniversary tour.
- 1965 – In June the Seekers performed in the United States on The Ed Sullivan Show singing "A World of Our Own" and "You Can Tell The World".
- 1966 – In November the Seekers performed at a Royal Command Performance at the London Palladium before the Queen Mother.
- 1967 – The Seekers made another appearance on The Ed Sullivan Show singing "Georgy Girl".
- 1967 – The Seekers represented Australia at Expo 67 in Montreal, Quebec, Canada (when they appeared on television in Australia via the first satellite transmission from the United States to Australia).
- 1967 – Melbourne, 12 March, Sidney Myer Music Bowl. The Seekers played to an estimated 200,000 people in a televised concert celebrating their overseas success.

== Television specials ==
- 1965 – An Evening with The Seekers
- 1966 – The Seekers at Home
- 1967 – The Seekers Down Under and The World of The Seekers
- Four television mini-specials titled A Date with the Seekers
- 1968 – 1968 BBC Farewell Spectacular
- 2019 – ABC Television's Australian Story
- 2019 – SBS Television screens the Decca DVD Farewell Album

== Honours and awards ==
- In 1966, the Seekers received the Carl Alan Award for Best New Group at the Top Of The Pops Awards, in London.
- In 1968, Guy and the other members of The Seekers were named jointly and severally Australians of the Year 1967.
- In the 1995 Australia Day Honours, Guy, along with the other members of The Seekers, was awarded the Medal of the Order of Australia (OAM).
- In 2006, Guy and the other members of The Seekers were presented with the Key to the City by Melbourne's Lord Mayor, John So.
- In 2012, Guy and the other members of the Seekers were honoured by Australia Post with a special Legends Of Australian Music postage stamp.
- In the 2014 Queen's Birthday Honours, Guy, along with the other members of The Seekers, was advanced as an Officer of the Order of Australia (AO).

== Discography ==
=== Albums ===
Title	Album details
Introducing the Seekers	Released: 1963; Label: W&G
The Seekers	Released: 1964; Label: W&G
Hide & Seekers	Released: 1964; Label: W&G
A World of Our Own	Released: 1965; Label: Columbia, EMI Music Australia
Come the Day	Released: September 1966; Label: Columbia, EMI
Seekers Seen in Green	Released: November 1967; Label: Columbia, EMi
The Seekers	Released: 1975; Label: Astor, Polydor
Giving and Taking	Released: July 1976; Label: Astor, Polydor
Live On	Released: March 1989; Label: Polydor Records
Future Road	Released: October 1997; Label: EMI Music Australia
Morningtown Ride to Christmas	Released: November 2001; Label: Sony Music Australia
Back to Our Roots	Released: June 2019; Label: Sony Music Australia

=== Live Albums ===
Title	Album details
Live at the Talk of the Town	Released: July 1968; Label: Columbia, EMI
25 Year Reunion Celebration	Released: November 1993; Label: EMI Music Australia
1968 BBC Farewell Spectacular	Released: November 1999; Label: Mushroom
Night of Nights... Live!	Released: 2002; Label: Mushroom
Farewell	Released: 12 April 2019; Label: Decca
The Carnival of Hits Tour 2000	Released: 23 August 2019; Label: Decca
Live in the UK	Released: 2 July 2021; Label: Decca

=== Singles ===
Title	Year
"Kumbaya"	1963
"Waltzing Matilda"	1963
"Myra"	1964
"I'll Never Find Another You"	1964
"What Have They Done to the Rain"	1965
"A World of Our Own"	1965
"Chilly Winds"	1965
"Morningtown Ride"	1965
"Cotton Fields"	1965
"The Carnival Is Over"	1965
"Lady Mary"	1965
"Someday, One Day"	1966
"Walk with Me"	1966
"Georgy Girl"	1966
"Isa Lei"	1966
"Myra (Shake Up the Party)"	1967
"On the Other Side"	1967
"When Will the Good Apples Fall"	1967
"Emerald City"	1967
"Love Is Kind, Love Is Wine"	1968
"Days of My Life"	1968
"With My Swag All on My Shoulder"	1968
"Island of Dreams"	1968
"Children Go Where I Send You"	1969
"Colours of My Life"	1969
"Sparrow Song"	1975
"Love Isn't Love Until You Give It Away"	1975
"Reunion"	1975
"Break These Chains"	1976
"A Part of You"	1976
"Where in the World"	1976
"Giving and Taking"	1976
"Vagabond"	1977
"How Can a Love So Wrong Be So Right"	1988
"Building Bridges"	1989
"Keep a Dream in Your Pocket"	1993
"A World of Our Own" (re-recording)	1994
"Georgy Girl" (re-recording)	1994
"Calling Me Home"	1997
"Carry Me"	2022

=== Songwriter and performer ===
- 1964 The Seekers: "Myra" (Durham/Guy/Potger/Woodley)
- 1965 The Seekers: "Two Summers" (Woodley)
- 1965 The Seekers: "Don't Tell Me My Mind" (Woodley)
- 1966 The Seekers: "Come the Day" (Woodley)
- 1966 The Seekers: "Red Rubber Ball" (Woodley/Simon)
- 1966 The Seekers: "I Wish You Could Be Here" (Woodley/Simon)
- 1967 The Seekers: "Love is Kind, Love is Wine" (Woodley)
- 1967 The Seekers: "The Sad Cloud" (Woodley/Westlake)
- 1967 The Seekers: "Chase a Rainbow (Follow Your Dream)" (Woodley)
- 1967 The Seekers: "Angeline is Always Friday" (Tom Paxton/Woodley)
- 1967 The Seekers: "Cloudy" (Woodley/Simon)
- 1967 The Seekers: "Rattler" (Woodley)
- 1969 Bruce Woodley: "Friday Street Fantasy" [EP] ("Friday Man/Little One/Little Miss Sorrow/Captain Grumblepeg")
- 1969 "Friday Man/Captain Grumblepeg" [45]
- 1971 "Just Good Friends" [lp]
- 1971 "Friends/Rattler" [45]
- 1974 "The Roaring Days Vol. 1" [lp]
- 1987 "I am Australian" [box set: 2lp, book, cassette] (Woodley/Dobe Newton)
- 1997 The Seekers: "The Bush Girl" (Woodley/Lawson)
- 1997 The Seekers: "The Shores of Avalon" (Arrangement and original lyrics: Durham/Guy/Kovac/Potger/Woodley)
- 1997 The Seekers: "Amazing" (Woodley/Cristian)
- 1997 The Seekers "Gotta Love Someone" (Woodley/Cristian)
- [ND] Bruce Woodley: "Can We Learn to Get Along" [45]
- [ND] "The ANZ Bank Travelling Man" [promo 45]
- [ND] "The Colours of Your Days" [45]

=== Songwriter only ===
- 1966 Simon and Garfunkel: "Cloudy", (Woodley/Simon) on the album Parsley, Sage, Rosemary and Thyme US #4 album (Woodley co-writing credit omitted)
- 1967 The Cyrkle: "Red Rubber Ball" (Woodley/Simon) US #2
- 1967 The Cyrkle: "I Wish You Could Be Here" (Woodley/Simon) US #70
- 1967 Herman's Hermits: Little Miss Sorrow, Child of Tomorrow (Woodley) on the album There's a Kind of Hush all Over the World.
- 1967 Herman's Hermits: Rattler (Woodley) on the album There's a Kind of Hush all Over the World.
- 1967 Lulu: Rattler (Woodley) on the album Love Loves to Love Lulu (To Sir, with Love)
- Hans Poulsen: "Boom Sha La La Lo" (Poulsen/Woodley)
- 1969 Zoot: "Monty & Me" (Poulsen/Woodley)
- 1969 The Strangers "Lady Scorpio" (Poulsen /Woodley)
- 1972 The Clancy Brothers "Save the Land" (Woodley) on the album Save the Land, Track A1
