= Live On =

Live On may refer to:

- Live On (The Seekers album), 1989
- Live On (Kenny Wayne Shepherd album), 1999
- Live On (TV series), 2020
