= Twinn Connexion =

American singing duo of identical twins

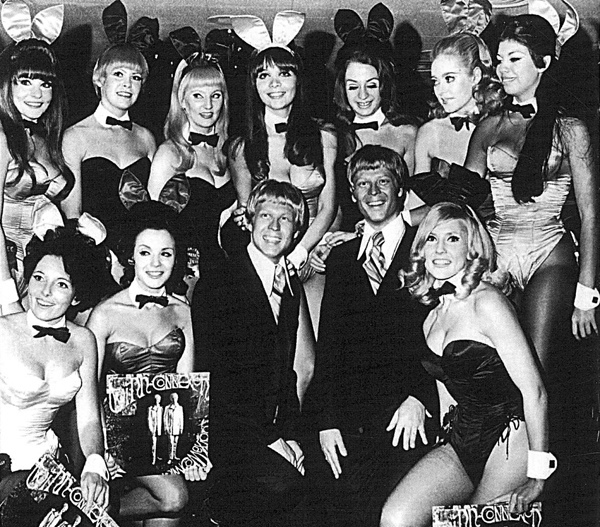
- Twinn Connexion celebrating their album release at New York's Playboy Club in 1968

Background information
- Origin: Helena, Montana, U.S.
- Genres: Sunshine pop, soft rock, bubblegum pop
- Years active: 1968–1969
- Labels: Decca, Now Sounds, Big Pink
- Past members: Jerry Hopkins; Jay Hopkins
- Website: www.twinnconnexion.com

Twinn Connexion was the singing duo of identical twin brothers Jerry and Jay Hopkins. They were signed with Decca Records and released a self-titled album in 1968 with songs by Jerry Keller and David Blume. Their musical style consisted of pop harmonies influenced by the soft rock and folk rock styles that were popular during the late 1960s. Jay Hopkins died on September 6, 2001, and Jerry Hopkins died on October 1, 2022.

The duo's songs have featured on multiple sunshine pop compilations. A digitally remastered and expanded edition of the 1968 Twinn Connexion album was reissued by the Now Sounds record label on May 18, 2010.

== Biography ==
=== Early years ===
Born on January 15, 1941, identical twin brothers Jerry and Jay Hopkins grew up in Helena, Montana. They began singing together in grade school and performed in several plays at the Old Brewery Theatre, a summer stock playhouse in Helena. They reprised their roles from the play The Remarkable Mr. Pennypacker in a national television commercial as the Imperial Margarine twins. While in high school, the brothers starred in a local half-hour weekly television show, "Teen Time Varieties".

In January 1963, after attending the University of Montana, the twins moved to New York City. They appeared in Off-Broadway theatre productions, worked in costume and set design, and maintained day jobs. They secured regular singing gigs at coffeehouses and clubs in Greenwich Village, where they were discovered by Decca Records executive Bill Downer.

=== Recording history ===
After signing with Decca Records, Twinn Connexion began work on an album with producer Jerry Keller, his frequent collaborator Dave Blume, and session musicians from the Carolyn Hester Coalition. The duo's first single with Decca, "Sixth Avenue Stroll", was released in July 1968. Record World called it a "bright song" and remarked that the brothers "should make a connexion with kids". Twinn Connexion's self-titled debut album was released in October. The cover features the brothers standing next to each other wearing identical yellow and white Nehru suits with green ascots and pins with "2x" written on them.

In the July 20, 1968, issue of Billboard magazine, "Oh What Lovely Day" was recognized in the "Special Merit Spotlight" column, where the publication reports designated singles "deserving [of] special attention". The critic wrote that the song's happy beat and duo's sound "could easily hit with much play and sales impact." Twinn Connexion's final Decca single was "I Think I Know Him", released late in 1968. A Cash Box review complimented the song's instrumentation and vocal delivery. The B-side is a cover version of The Cyrkle's "Turn-Down Day", a 1966 single that was also written by Keller and Blume.

=== Later careers ===
Decca was acquired by Westinghouse Electric and promotion for Twinn Connexion dwindled, so Jerry Hopkins went back to school, earned an art degree and lived in Woodstock, New York. Jay Hopkins became a metals trader on Wall Street, where he worked until he died of heart failure in September 2001. Twinn Connexion songs have appeared on compilation albums such as Morning Glory Daze: Universal Soft Rock Collection, Vol. 2 (1997) and Get Easy! Sunshine Pop Collection (2003). The duo's self-titled debut album was reissued in 2010 by Now Sounds, an imprint of Cherry Red Records. Later in 2010, an album titled Songs from the Heart, featuring remastered versions of previously unreleased Twinn Connexion songs, was released in Korea and Japan by Big Pink Music.

Jerry Hopkins died on October 1, 2022, after a long battle with cancer.

Hopkins's friend Jay Blotcher is currently shopping around the Twinn Connexion screenplay that Hopkins co-wrote in 2005 with his life companion, Robert Cessna.

== Twinn Connexion (1968) ==
The album was released by Decca Records on October 4, 1968, with songs by Jerry Keller and David Blume. The musical style consisted of pop harmonies influenced by the soft rock and folk rock styles that were popular during the late 1960s.

Interest in the duo's music was revived when their musical style was recognized as belonging to the subgenre of 1960s pop music now called sunshine pop. Their songs were featured on several popular sunshine pop compilations. There was soon a demand for the 1968 Twinn Connexion album, with the rare copies fetching high prices on the collectors' market.

A digitally remastered and expanded edition of the 1968 Twinn Connexion album was reissued by the Now Sounds record label on May 18, 2010.

The remastered CD includes eight bonus tracks. The 24-page booklet features liner notes by three-time Grammy® nominee Sheryl Farber, with commentary from the surviving member of the duo, Jerry Hopkins.

=== Track listing ===
1. "Sixth Avenue Stroll
2. "I Think I'll Just Go and Find Me a Flower
3. "I Think I Know Him
4. "Dilemma
5. "Turn Down Day
6. "The Music Turns Me On
7. "Foolin' Around
8. "Wind Me Up and I Dance
9. "Summer Sadness
10. "Young and Free
11. "Oh What a Lovely Day

Reissue bonus tracks

12. "The Silent Parade"
13. "Think I Will"
14. "Mary"
15. "Reach Out to Meet Myself"
16. "Turn Down Day" (Mono Single Version)
17. "I Think I Know Him" (Mono Single Version)
18. "Oh What a Lovely Day" (Mono Single Version)
19. "Sixth Avenue Stroll" (Mono Single Version)

== Discography ==
=== Albums ===
- Twinn Connexion (Decca, 1968; expanded reissue by Now Sounds, 2010)
- Songs from the Heart (Big Pink, 2010)

=== Singles ===
- "Your Porch Swing Squeaks" (Columbia, 1968)
- "Sixth Avenue Stroll" (Decca, 1968)
- "I Think I Know Him" (Decca, 1968)
