= Greatest Hits (The Seekers album) =

Greatest hits album by The Seekers
- Released: 13 June 2009
- Genre: Folk, pop, world
- Length: 73:01
- Label: EMI Music Australia

The Seekers chronology
All Bound for Morningtown (2009)	Greatest Hits (2009)	The Golden Jubilee Album (2012)

Greatest Hits is a compilation album by Australian band The Seekers. The album was released in June 2009 and peaked within the top 40 in the UK and Australia.

== Reception ==
Professional ratings
Review scores
Source	Rating
AllMusic	3.5/5 stars

Steve Leggett from AllMusic wrote: "A very generous 28-track single-disc set of the best of The Seekers, this collection has everything the casual listener might need and more. The big hits, "Georgy Girl" and "I'll Never Find Another You," are here, along with pleasant but hardly distinctive versions of an assortment of folk revival-era standards like "Five Hundred Miles" and the dilemma of a singing group caught between folk and AM radio pop without a distinctive in-house songwriter is apparent. Still, the Seekers were a polished, professional group and Judith Durham's warm, appealing Judy Collins-like voice is always a joy to hear."

== Track listing ==
EMI (6956352)

1. "Morningtown Ride" - 2:41
2. "Island of Dreams" - 2:29
3. "I'll Never Find Another You" - 2:43
4. "Walk with Me" - 3:15
5. "Yesterday" - 2:24
6. "California Dreamin'" - 2:30
7. "The Carnival is Over" - 3:12
8. "Danny Boy" - 3:04
9. "Well Well Well" - 2:18
10. "Kumbaya" - 2:32
11. "Colours of My Life" - 2:35
12. "Blowin' in the Wind" - 2:32
13. "The 59th Street Bridge Song (Feelin' Groovy)" - 2:17
14. "Red Rubber Ball" - 2:13
15. "We Shall Not Be Moved" - 2:24
16. "Five Hundred Miles" - 2:55
17. "Turn! Turn! Turn!" - 3:15
18. "Georgy Girl" - 2:20
19. "Myra" - 2:00
20. "A World of Our Own" - 2:44
21. "Someday One Day" - 2:35
22. "Nobody Knows the Trouble I've Seen" - 2:27
23. "Whiskey in the Jar" - 2:21
24. "Open Up Them Pearly Gates" - 2:15
25. "Emerald City" - 2:40
26. "When Will the Good Apples Fall" - 2:29
27. "The Last Thing on My Mind" - 3:17
28. "The Eriskay Love Lilt" - 2:34

== Chart positions ==
Chart (2009–11)	Peak position
Australian Albums (ARIA)	31
Scottish Albums (OCC)	29
UK Albums (OCC)	34
