= Cessna (disambiguation) =

Cessna was an American aircraft manufacturing company.

Cessna is the name of:

== People ==
- Bob Cessna (1934–2008), American actor
- Clyde Cessna (1879–1954), American aircraft designer
- John Cessna (1821–1893), American politician from Pennsylvania

== Places ==
- Cessna, Pennsylvania
- Cessna Township, Hardin County, Ohio

== See also ==
- Cesena
- Cessna Aircraft Field
- Cessna Stadium
