= A Little Bit of Country =

Studio album by The Seekers
- Released: April 1980
- Studios: TCS Studio, Richmond
- Genres: Folk, World, Country
- Label: Hammard

The Seekers chronology
24 Golden Greats (1978)	A Little Bit of Country (1980)	This is the Seekers (1980)

A Little Bit of Country is the ninth studio album by Australian group the Seekers. The album was released in April 1980 and features vocals by Cheryl Webb. The album peaked at number 84 in Australia.

== Track listing ==
=== Side A ===
1. "Banks of the Ohio" (John Farrar, Bruce Welch; arranged by Peter Sullivan)
2. "Cotton Fields" (Huddie Ledbetter; arranged by The Seekers)
3. "Leaving on a Jet Plane" (John Denver; arranged by Peter Sullivan)
4. "Try a Little Kindness" (Curt Sapaugh, Bobby Austin; arranged by Peter Sullivan)
5. "Jamaica Fairwell" (Lord Burgess; arranged by The Seekers)
6. "Jesus Is a Soul Man" (Lawrence Reynolds, Jack Cardwell; arranged by The Seekers)
7. "Silver Threads and Golden Needles" (Jack Rhodes, Dick Reynolds; arranged by Douggie Reece)
8. "Country Road" (Bill Danoff, Taffy Nivert, John Denver; arranged by The Seekers)

=== Side B ===
1. "Have You Never Been Mellow" (John Farrar; arranged by Peter Sullivan)
2. "Afternoon Delight" (Bill Danoff; arranged by Peter Sullivan)
3. "Sad Eyes" (Robert John; arranged by Peter Sullivan)
4. "Let Your Love Flow" (Larry E. Williams; arranged by Douggie Reece)
5. "Lost in Love" (James Dewar, Robin Trower; arranged by Douggie Reece)
6. "Scarborough Fair" (Paul Simon, Art Garfunkel; arranged by The Seekers)
7. "Try to Remember" (Harvey Schmidt, Tom Jones; arranged by Peter Sullivan)
8. "Lyin' Eyes" (Don Henley, Glenn Frey; arranged by Peter Sullivan)

== Weekly charts ==
Chart (1980)	Peak position
Australian Kent Music Report Albums Chart	84
