= All Bound for Morningtown =

Box set by The Seekers
- Released: 22 May 2009
- Recorded: 1964–1968
- Genre: Folk, pop, world, Folk-rock, Easy listening
- Label: EMI Music Australia, Parlophone Records

The Seekers chronology
The Ultimate Collection (2007)	All Bound for Morningtown (2009)	Greatest Hits (2009)

All Bound for Morningtown is a 4-disc box set by Australian band The Seekers containing the group's EMI Recordings from 1964 to 1968. The album was released in May 2009 and peaked within the top 40 in New Zealand.

== Reception ==
Polly Weeks from Gloucester Live gave the album 6 out of 10 saying, "With so much material to get through, it's hard to judge this as one album. Suffice to say, if you were to listen to the entire album in one sitting you'd have to be an incredibly keen and patient Seekers fan. Individually the songs are of a good quality with strong harmonies."

== Track listing ==
CD1

1. "I'll Never Find Another You"
2. "Open Up Them Pearly Gates"
3. "The Wreck of the Old 97"
4. "Danny Boy"
5. "Waltzing Matilda"
6. "Cotton Fields"
7. "Lemon Tree"
8. "Gotta Travel On"
9. "With My Swag All on My Shoulder"
10. "Plaisir d'amour"
11. "Isa Lei"
12. "Whiskey in the Jar"
13. "Five Hundred Miles"
14. "The Gypsy Rover (The Whistling Gypsy)"
15. "South Australia"
16. "This Little Light of Mine"
17. "Morningtown Ride"
18. "The Water is Wide"
19. "Well, Well, Well"
20. "Lady Mary"
21. "We're Moving On"
22. "The Ox Droving Song"
23. "Kumbaya"
24. "Blowin' in the Wind"
25. "The Eriskay Love Lilt"
26. "Chilly Winds"
27. "What Have They Done to the Rain"
28. "A World of Our Own"
29. "Sinner Man"

CD2

1. "A World of Our Own"
2. "Don't Think Twice, It's All Right"
3. "The Leaving of Liverpool"
4. "This Land is Your Land"
5. "Two Summers"
6. "The Times They Are a Changin'"
7. "Just a Closer Walk with Thee"
8. "Don't Tell Me My Mind"
9. "Allentown Jail"
10. "Four Strong Winds"
11. "You Can Tell The World"
12. "Whistling Rufus"
13. "Sinner Man"
14. "The Carnival Is Over"
15. "We Shall Not Be Moved"
16. "Some Day One Day"
17. "Nobody Knows The Trouble I've Seen"
18. "We're Moving On"
19. "Come The Day"
20. "Island of Dreams"
21. "The Last Thing on My Mind"
22. "All Over The World (Dans Le Monde En Entier)"
23. "Red Rubber Ball"
24. "Well Well Well"
25. "Georgy Girl"
26. "Yesterday"
27. "I Wish You Could Be Here"
28. "Turn! Turn! Turn!"
29. "Louisiana Man"
30. "California Dreamin'"

CD3

1. "Walk With Me"
2. "Morningtown Ride"
3. "When The Stars Begin To Fall"
4. "Love Is Kind, Love Is Wine"
5. "The Sad Cloud"
6. "59th Street Bridge Song (Feelin' Groovy)"
7. "If You Go Away"
8. "All I Can Remember"
9. "Chase a Rainbow (Follow Your Dream)"
10. "Angeline is Always Friday"
11. "On the Other Side"
12. "Cloudy"
13. "Can't Make Up My Mind"
14. "Rattler"
15. "Colours Of My Life"
16. "This Is My Song"
17. "Paper Bird"
18. "The Music of the World a Turnin'" [Alternate Version]
19. "Walk With Me"
20. "Morningtown Ride"
21. "When the Stars Begin to Fall"
22. "Georgy Girl"
23. "The Last Thing on My Mind"
24. "When Will The Good Apples Fall"
25. "Myra"
26. "Emerald City"
27. "The Music of the World a Turnin'"
28. "Days of My Life"
29. "Study War No More"

CD4

1. "Music of the World a Turnin'" (live at the Talk of the Town)
2. "I'll Never Find Another You" (live at the Talk of the Town)
3. "With My Swag All On My Shoulder" (live at the Talk of the Town)
4. "Hello Mary Lou" (live at the Talk of the Town)
5. "I Wish You Could Be Here" (live at the Talk of the Town)
6. "I Shall Not Be Moved|We Shall Not Be Moved" (live at the Talk of the Town)
7. "Morningtown Ride" (live at the Talk of the Town)
8. "A World of Our Own" (live at the Talk of the Town)
9. "Rattler" (live at the Talk of the Town)
10. "The Olive Tree" (live at the Talk of the Town)
11. "Colours of My Life" (live at the Talk of the Town)
12. "Ragtime Mix" (live at the Talk of the Town)
13. "Angeline is Always Friday" (live at the Talk of the Town)
14. "Love Is Kind, Love Is Wine" (live at the Talk of the Town)
15. "The Carnival is Over" (live at the Talk of the Town)
16. "Georgy Girl" (live at the Talk of the Town)
17. "The Olive Tree" (Judith Durham solo)
18. "The Non-Performing Lion Quickstep" (Judith Durham solo)
19. "Again Again" (Judith Durham solo)
20. "Memories" (Judith Durham solo)
21. "The Carnival Is Over"
22. "We Shall Not Be Moved"
23. "Nobody Knows the Trouble I've Seen"
24. "Myra"
25. "Emerald City" (No Children's Voices Version)

== Chart positions ==
Chart (2011)	Peak position
New Zealand Albums (RMNZ)	36
