= Hidden Treasures – Volume 1 =

Compilation album by The Seekers
- Released: 22 May 2020
- Label: The Seekers, UMA, Decca

The Seekers chronology
The Carnival of Hits Tour 2000 (2019)	Hidden Treasures – Volume 1 (2020)	Hidden Treasures – Volume 2 (2020)

Hidden Treasures – Volume 1 (also known as Hidden Treasures: The Rarities Collection Volume 1) is a compilation album by Australian band The Seekers. The album was announced in April 2020 as the first of a trilogy of releases featuring lost classics and rarities.

Hidden Treasures – Volume 1 was released on 22 May 2020 and contains seven live performances from their 1967 Sidney Myer Music Bowl show, the first time they've been heard since that concert.

== Reception ==
Jeff Jenkins from Stack Magazine called the album "A celebration of pure talent." Jenkins said "The Seekers became the first Aussie band to top the UK and US charts not because of any studio trickery but because they were simply a fine singing group."

== Track listing ==
1. "Waltzing Matilda" (Queensland Version) – 2:53
2. "3AK Jingle 1" – 0:36
3. "3AK Jingle 2" – 0:19
4. "3AK Jingle 3" – 0:18
5. "Nothing to Do (And All Day to Do It In)" (Frankie Davidson featuring The Seekers) – 2:15
6. "Sally Was a Good Old Girl" (Frankie Davidson featuring The Seekers) – 2:31
7. "Blow the Man Down" – 2:35
8. "Bound for Australia" (also known as "South Australia") – 1:36
9. "High Barbary" – 2:19
10. "Eddystone Light" – 1:21
11. "Leave Her Johnny, Leave Her" – 2:19
12. "A Rovin" – 2:29
13. "You Can Tell the World" – 3:24
14. "Blowin' in the Wind" – 2:38
15. "Kumbaya" – 2:31
16. "This Little Light of Mine" – 2:40
17. "Dont Think Twice Its Alright" (Includes Gold Record Presentation) – 4:25
18. "Cotton Fields" – 2:04
19. "Coca-Cola Jingle 1" – 1:04
20. "Coca-Cola Jingle 2" – 1:31
21. "Come the Day" – 2:10
22. "Morningtown Ride" – 2:40
23. "A World of Our Own" – 1:59
24. "The Leaving of Liverpool" – 3:02
25. "Red Rubber Ball" – 2:14
26. "The Carnival is Over" – 3:04
27. "Georgy Girl" – 2:14
- Note: Tracks 13–18 are from The Big Show Tour
- Note Tracks 21–27 are from Music for the People, Sidney Myer Music Bowl in March 1967

== Charts ==
Chart performance for Hidden Treasures – Volume 1
Chart (2020)	Peak position
Australian Albums (ARIA)	21

== Release history ==
Region	Date	Format	Label	Catalogue
Australia	22 May 2020	CD, digital download, streaming	The Seekers, Universal Music Australia, Decca	0896358
