= Hidden Treasure =

Hidden Treasure may refer to:

- Parable of the Hidden Treasure, a well known parable of Jesus
- A Hidden Treasure, an important hadith (tradition) in Sufism
- Buried treasure, a popular belief surrounding pirates, vikings, mobsters and Old West outlaws
- Hidden Treasure (horse), a Canadian Champion Thoroughbred racehorse
- Hidden Treasure (album)
- Gupta Ratna or Hidden Treasure, a 1931 Indian silent film by B. S. Rajhans

== See also ==
- Hidden Treasures (disambiguation)
