= Julie Anthony (singer) =

Australian singer and entertainer

Julie Anthony AM OBE
- Born: Julie Moncrieff Lush; 24 August 1949 (age 76); Lameroo, South Australia, Australia
- Genres: Jazz, pop
- Occupations: Singer, entertainer
- Years active: 1967–2007

Julie Moncrieff Anthony AM OBE (née Lush, born 24 August 1949) is an Australian former professional singer and entertainer.

Anthony is well known for her brief stint in place of Judith Durham, as lead singer of The Seekers

A soprano, she has recorded both jazz and pop and is well-known for her live singing performances, variety appearances and roles in cabaret and theatre. Anthony has performed with numerous artists including Simon Gallagher and Anthony Warlow at the Sydney Opera House

She recorded an album with jazz performer Don Burrows called Together at Last.

She sang the Australian national anthem at the Opening Ceremony of the 2000 Sydney Olympics with Human Nature.

== Biography ==
=== Early life and career ===
Anthony was born to Betty and Les Lush, a sheep and wheat farmer and had an older brother, Steven. She is from a family of aunts, uncles, and grandparents who all worked in the farming sector. Les Lush played professional Australian rules football for Glenelg in the South Australian National Football League, playing 34 games and kicking 126 goals.

Anthony worked on the family farm before deciding on a singing career, citing her musical influences as Ella Fitzgerald and Burt Bacharach. She was billed originally in her career under her birth name of Julie Lush. She started performing in a local band and won a talent contest, and began performing on the TV program The Country and Western Hour hosted by Reg Lindsay. She also appeared in her native Adelaide on The Ernie Sigley Show before performing regularly on The Graham Kennedy Show.

Anthony married Eddie Natt in 1976 and has two daughters, Talitha and Tamara.

== With the Seekers ==
She sang with the Seekers, first taking the place of Judith Durham as the lead vocalist in the song "The Carnival Is Over" for the Closing Ceremony of Expo '88. Later, Anthony became a member of the group with Bruce Woodley, Athol Guy and Keith Potger. They released an album, Live On, in March 1989, which peaked at number 26.

== Animation recordings ==
In 1991, she recorded the song "Ordinary Miracles" for the 1991 Australian animated fantasy movie The Magic Riddle. In 1992, she also recorded another song, "Sleep Bush Baby Sleep", for the Yoram Gross movie Blinky Bill The Mischievous Koala.

== Theatre ==
Anthony starred in both the Australian and West End productions of the musical Irene in the mid-1970s. She won the Commercial Broadcasting Federation Award in Australia for Best Easy Listening Album 1975. Her first performance in the musical, at the Adelphi Theatre, London, was 15 June 1976.

Her numerous theatre performances include The Sound of Music, I Do! I Do! and The Mikado.

At midnight between 31 December 1987 and 1 January 1988, in celebration of the start of Australia's Bicentennial year, Anthony sang the Australian national anthem, "Advance Australia Fair", on the national broadcaster, the Australian Broadcasting Corporation, which continued to show the recording of her performance at the close of broadcasting for many years afterwards, until the broadcaster introduced 24-hour broadcasting.

=== Commercials for St George Bank ===
Anthony was well-known for her appearances for the St George Bank, in which she featured from 1974 to 1999. In 1993 she released a version of "Puff the Magic Dragon" in conjunction with the bank as part of an advertising campaign.

== Discography ==
=== Studio albums ===
List of albums, with selected chart positions
Title	Album details	Peak chart positions	Certification
Title	Album details	AUS	Certification
Hello in There	Released: 1975; Format: LP; Label: EMI (EMA-319)	-	
A Part of Me	Released: 1977; Format: LP, cassette; Label: EMI (EMC.2582)	-	
Something Special	Released: July 1978; Format: LP, cassette; Label: EMI (EMC.2673)	92	
China Blue	Released: 1981; Format: LP, cassette; Label: Axis (AX.1179)	-	
Here I Am	Released: July 1982; Format: LP, cassette; Label: J&B Records (JB110)	13	AUS: Gold
What a Feeling	Released: December 1983; Format: LP, cassette; Label: J&B Records (JB150)	40	
This Is It	Released: May 1985; Format: LP, cassette; Label: J&B Records (JB210)	15	
20 Years of No. 1 Hits	Released: September 1986; Format: LP, cassette; Label: J&B Records (JB267)	37	
I Dreamed a Dream	Released: 1991; Format: CD, cassette; Label: J&B Records (JB467)	-	
Together at Last with Don Burrows)	Released: 1994; Format: CD; Label: Castle Communications (CTVCD 1001)	-	
Never Stop Believing	Released: 1999; Format: CD; Label: Festival Records (D24151)	-	

=== Live albums ===
List of live albums, with selected chart positions
Title	Album details
Live at the Tilbury (with Michael Harvey)	Released: 1996; Format: CD; Label: Cue Recordings (OR021)

=== Compilation albums ===
List of compilations albums, with selected chart positions
Title	Album details
I Dreamed a Dream	Released: 1988; Format: CD, cassette; Label: GNP Crescendo Records (GNPS 2195)
Memories - The Ultimate Collection	Released: 6 November, 2015; Format: CD; Label: Fanfare Records (Fanfare216)

=== Singles ===
List of singles, with selected chart positions
Year	Title	Peak chart positions	Album
Year	Title	AUS	Album
1973	"Wonderful Dream"	-	Non-album singles
1975	"If Only He Knew"	-	Non-album singles
1977	"You're the Only Man"	-	Non-album singles
1980	"I've Only Said "I Love You" in My Mind"	77	China Blue
1981	"China Blue"	34	China Blue
1983	"More Than Friends" / "Walking on Thin Air"	-	What a Feeling
1991	"Ordinary Miracles"	141	The Magic Riddle

== Honours and awards ==
Anthony is among the most awarded of Australian entertainers. She was made an Officer of the Order of the British Empire (OBE) (1980) and a Member of the Order of Australia (AM) (1989)

=== Australian Record Awards ===
Year	Nominee / work	Award	Result
1975	Julie Anthony Album	Easy Listening Female Vocal	Won

=== Mo Awards ===
The Australian Entertainment Mo Awards (commonly known informally as the Mo Awards), were annual Australian entertainment industry awards. They recognise achievements in live entertainment in Australia from 1975 to 2016. Julie Anthony won thirteen awards in that time.

Year	Nominee / work	Award	Result (wins only)
1976	Julie Anthony	Best Female Vocal of the Year	Won
1977	Julie Anthony	Best Female Vocal of the Year	Won
1977	Julie Anthony	Entertainer of the Year	Won
1978	Julie Anthony	Best Female Vocal of the Year	Won
1978	Julie Anthony	Entertainer of the Year	Won
1980	Julie Anthony	Female Vocal of the Year	Won
1982	Julie Anthony	Female Vocal of the Year	Won
1982	Julie Anthony	Entertainer of the Year	Won
1986	Julie Anthony	Female Vocal of the Year	Won
1988	Julie Anthony	Female Vocal Entertainer of the Year	Won
1988	Julie Anthony	Daily Telegraph Readers Award – Female	Won
1993	Julie Anthony	Female Vocal Variety Entertainer of the Year	Won
1995	Julie Anthony	Female Vocal Variety Entertainer of the Year	Won
