= Night of Nights... Live! =

Live album by The Seekers
- Released: 4 October 2002
- Genre: Pop, Folk, World
- Length: 103:00
- Label: Sony Music Australia

The Seekers chronology
Morningtown Ride to Christmas (2001)	Night of Nights... Live! (2002)	The Ultimate Collection (2003)

Night of Nights... Live! is a live album by Australian band, The Seekers. The album was released in October 2002. The Night of Nights tour was from 18 February to 16 April 2000, and later in the UK from 29 May to 6 June 2000. The album was re-released in August 2019 under the title, The Carnival of Hits Tour 2000.

== Track listing ==
CD1

1. "You Can Tell The World" - 2:15
2. "Love is Kind, Love is Wine" - 2:26
3. "When the Stars Begin to Fall" - 3:08
4. "This Train"
5. "Morningtown Ride" - 2:41
6. "When Will the Good Apples Fall" - 2:29
7. "Red Rubber Ball" - 2:13
8. "Puff the Magic Dragon"
9. "I Am Australian"
10. "The Light from the Lighthouse"
11. "Medley" ("Open Up Them Pearly Gates"/"We Shall Not Be Moved")

CD2

1. "I'll Never Find Another You" (Tom Springfield) - 2:42
2. "Someday One Day" - 2:35
3. "Walk with Me"
4. "The Shores of Avalon"
5. "You're My Spirit"
6. "Colours Of My Life" - 2:44
7. "The Bush Girl"
8. "Myra" - 2:00
9. "Just a Closer Walk with Thee" - 3:21
10. "Ten Thousand Years Ago"
11. "This is My Song" - 2:47
12. "Keep a Dream in Your Pocket
13. "Georgy Girl" - 2:20
14. "The Carnival is Over - 3:12
15. "A World of Our Own" - 2:43

== Charts ==
Chart (2002/03)	Peak position
Australian Albums (ARIA)	26

== Release history ==
Region	Date	Format	Label	Catalogue
Australia/New Zealand	4 October 2002	CD, Cassette	Sony Music Australia	5097542000
