= Bob Cessna =

American actor

- Born: December 17, 1934; Punxsutawney, Pennsylvania, U.S.
- Died: August 2, 2008 (aged 73); New York City, New York, U.S.
- Occupations: Actor, playwright, scriptwriter
- Spouse: Gerald Hopkins (1965–2008)

Bob Cessna (1934–2008) was an American actor, scriptwriter and playwright who appeared on Broadway in many roles. He wrote several off Broadway and off off Broadway plays. He also wrote for television.

Cessna died of lung cancer on August 2, 2008, at the age of 73 at New York Hospital.

== Personal life and education ==
Robert Thomas Cessna was born on December 17, 1934, in Punxsutawney, Pennsylvania. He graduated from the Catholic University of America in Washington, D.C., with a degree in Drama.

Cessna made Woodstock his home during the last few years of his life, where he was active in the arts. His domestic partner and companion of 44 years is the Woodstock artist and founding member of the singing duo Twinn Connexion Gerald "Jerry" Hopkins.

== Acting career ==
Cessna began his professional career as the understudy for the British cast of Beyond the Fringe that included Alan Bennett. He replaced Dudley Moore on Broadway and after a national tour he continued to play Moore's roles. He returned to New York City and reopened at the Barrymore Theater.

Cessna's performances in the Mad Show at New York's New Theater are still remembered for their versatility.

== Playwright ==
Cessna's plays were produced off Broadway and in various workshops. He was a playwright member of the 42nd Street Workshop and the Algonquin Theater Company.

Cessna's play First Week in Bogota was the first to open Playwrights Horizons. Other plays that were produced include The Blue Moon, A Family Comedy, Trios, To Dress a Naked Window, Final Vows, and A Few of the Usual Nudes. His musical, Werewulff, written with William David Brohn, was produced at the Hartke Theater in Washington, D.C., to sold out audiences.

== Scriptwriter ==
Cessna was also a scriptwriter for The Doctors and Another World. Shortly before his death he completed Twinn Connexion, a screenplay based on the Grammy-nominated singing duo Twinn Connexion, which was composed of Cessna's life partner Jerry Hopkins and Jerry's identical twin brother. Cessna also served as the duo's manager.

== Sources ==
- "Deaths CESSNA, Bob". The New York Times.
- Cratedigger: Twinn Connexion
