= The Seekers (1975 album) =

Studio album by the Seekers
- Released: May 1975
- Studios: Central Sound Studios, London; strings overdubbed at IBC Studios, London; mixed at IBC Studios, London; additional recording at TCS Studios, Melbourne
- Genres: Pop, folk
- Length: 45:54
- Labels: Astor, Polydor
- Producers: Bruce Woodley, Keith Potger

The Seekers chronology
The Second Album of the Very Best of The Seekers (1975)	The Seekers (1975)	Giving and Taking (1976)

The Seekers is the seventh studio album by Australian group the Seekers. The album was released in May 1975. Louisa Wisseling provided the vocals. It was the first Seekers album without Judith Durham. The lead single "Sparrow Song" was released in May 1975, peaking at number 7 on the Kent Music Report. A second single "Reunion" was released in November 1975 and peaked at number 83.

== Background ==
The Seekers had been a successful group in the 1960s, disbanding in July 1968 when lead singer Judith Durham left the group. In 1972, the band planned to reform, but needed a suitable female vocalist to replace Durham. Band member Athol Guy asked his friend Buddy England for assistance, who said: "After some time looking and listening I came across Louisa Wisseling at a restaurant/club called The Swagman ... took Athol to have a listen ... made Louisa an offer and there you are. I was also asked to vet material for the group to record... I signed them to the Astor label, then went to England to work on the production with the rest of the guys. The album was a success."

== Track listing ==
All tracks composed by Bruce Woodley; except where indicated

Side A

1. "Sparrow Song" - 3:56
2. "Goodbye Again" (John Denver) - 4:31
3. "Please Come to Boston" (Dave Loggins) - 3:50
4. "Sweet Surrender" (John Denver) - 3:51
5. "Freedom" - 3:52
6. "A Never Ending Song" - 3:21

Side B

1. "I'll Have to Say I Love You in a Song" (Jim Croce) - 2:34
2. "Sweet Sympathy" - 4:18
3. "Can We Learn to Get Along" - 3:23
4. "Break These Chains" - 3:13
5. "Every Road Leads Back to You" (Barry Mason, Keith Potger) - 4:14
6. "Reunion" - 5:32

== Weekly charts ==
Chart (1975)	Peak position
Australian Kent Music Report Albums Chart	17
