= Hidden Treasures – Volume 2 =

Compilation album by The Seekers
- Released: 23 October 2020
- Label: The Seekers; UMA; Decca

The Seekers chronology
Hidden Treasures – Volume 1 (2020)	Hidden Treasures – Volume 2 (2020)	Hidden Treasures – Volume 3 (2021)

Hidden Treasures – Volume 2 (also known as Hidden Treasures: The Rarities Collection Volume 2) is a compilation album by Australian band The Seekers and is the second of a trilogy of rarities announced to be released by the group. The album was released on 30 October 2020 and contains The Seekers' performance at Expo 67, held in Montreal, and the opening and closing sequences from the film Georgy Girl, as well as three songs from the performance at Christchurch, New Zealand on 14 February 1968, directly after which Judith announced she would be leaving the group.

== Track listing ==
=== CD ===
1. "Come the Day" – 2:07
2. "When the Stars Begin to Fall" – 3:09
3. "Red Rubber Ball" – 2:08
4. "A World of Our Own" – 1:54
5. "Georgy Girl" – 2:10
6. "Open Up Them Pearly Gates" – 2:02
7. "The Old Apple Tree" – 2:28
8. "Come On Baby" – 2:41
9. "Talk Back Trembling Lips" – 2:31
10. "The Warm Winter Sounds of 3AK (Jingle)" – 0:43
11. "Pacesetter Travel (Jingle)" – 1:01
12. "Rattler" – 2:55
13. "When Will the Good Apples Fall?" – 3:02
14. "Down by the Riverside" – 1:49
15. "Georgy Girl" (Film Opening Sequence) – 2:22
16. "Georgy Girl" (Film Closing Sequence) – 1:36

=== DVD ===
1. "Come the Day"
2. "When the Stars Begin to Fall"
3. "Red Rubber Ball"
4. "A World of Our Own"
5. "Georgy Girl"
6. "Open Up Them Pearly Gates"
- Note Tracks 1–6 are live from Expo '67 in Montreal, Canada
- Note: Tracks 12–14 are live from final Australian/New Zealand tour

== Charts ==
Chart performance of Hidden Treasures – Volume 2
Chart (2020)	Peak position
Australian Albums (ARIA)	56

== Release history ==
Region	Date	Format	Label	Catalogue
Various	23 October 2020	digital download, streaming	The Seekers, Universal Music Australia, Decca	
Australia	30 October 2020	CD+DVD	The Seekers, Universal Music Australia, Decca	3511750
