= The Carnival of Hits Tour 2000 =

Live album by The Seekers
- Released: 23 August 2019
- Length: 103:18
- Label: The Seekers, UMA, Decca

The Seekers chronology
Farewell (2019)	The Carnival of Hits Tour 2000 (2019)	Hidden Treasures - Volume 1 (2020)

The Carnival of Hits Tour 2000 is a re-issued live album by Australian band The Seekers. The album was originated released in 2002 under the title Night of Nights... Live!. The album was recorded in 2000 with fans in Australia and New Zealand from 18 February to 16 April, and later through the UK from 29 May to 6 June. The album was re-released in August 2019 under the title The Carnival of Hits Tour 2000.

== Reception ==
A reviewer at Marbecks NZ said "This Carnival of Hits Tour 2000 concert captures The Seekers at their absolute best and is, without question, the crowing jewel in their live recording cache. A vocal tour-de-force from all four Seekers, that crystal-clear sound so superbly enhanced by the group's long-time record producer Michael Cristiano's expert mixing and mastering."

== Track listing ==
CD 1

1. "You Can Tell the World"
2. "Love Is Kind, Love Is Wine"
3. "When the Stars Begin To Fall"
4. "This Train"
5. "Morningtown Ride"
6. "When Will the Good Apples Fall?"
7. "Red Rubber Ball"
8. "'Puff the Magic Dragon"
9. "I Am Australian"
10. "The Light for the Lighthouse"
11. "Open Up Them Pearly Gates" / "We Shall Not Be Moved" (Medley)

CD 2

1. "I'll Never Find Another You"
2. "Someday, One Day"
3. "Walk With Me"
4. "The Shores of Avalon"
5. "You're My Spirit"
6. "Colours of My Life"
7. "The Bush Girl"
8. "Myra"
9. "Just a Closer Walk with Thee"
10. "Ten Thousand Years Ago"
11. "This Is My Song"
12. "Keep a Dream in Your Pocket"
13. "Georgy Girl"
14. "The Carnival Is Over"
15. "A World of Our Own"

== Release history ==
Region	Date	Format	Label	Catalogue
Australia	23 August 2019	2x CD, Digital download, streaming	The Seekers, UMA, Decca	809314
New Zealand	18 October 2019	2x CD, Digital download, streaming	The Seekers, UMA, Decca	809314
