= Jerry Keller =

American pop singer (born 1937)

- Born: Jerry Paul Keller; June 20, 1937 (age 89); Fort Smith, Arkansas, U.S.
- Genres: Easy listening, traditional
- Occupations: Singer, songwriter
- Years active: 1956–present
- Labels: Kapp (U.S.); London (U.K.)

Jerry Paul Keller (born June 20, 1937) is an American pop singer and songwriter, best known for his 1959 hit song "Here Comes Summer".

== Career ==
Born in Fort Smith, Arkansas, Keller moved with his family to Tulsa, Oklahoma, when he was six, and Keller attended Tulsa's Will Rogers High School, graduating in 1955. He was known as a vocal soloist in various school productions, and was often invited to do guest vocals with top bands touring the area. He formed the group and was a member of the Tulsa Boy Singers.

Keller attended the University of Tulsa and moved to New York in 1956. Pat Boone, a friend from church, recommended Marty Mills as Keller's manager.

Keller's biggest self-penned hit was 1959's "Here Comes Summer". In 1959 it climbed to No. 14 in the Billboard Hot 100. The record reached No.1 in the UK for a week from October 9, 1959, but a lack of further chart appearances saw Keller branded as a one-hit wonder in Britain.

Keller also wrote the English lyrics of "A Man and a Woman", from "Un homme et une femme" by Francis Lai and Pierre Barouh. "A Man and a Woman" was recorded by such artists as Matt Monro, Ella Fitzgerald, Engelbert Humperdinck, Johnny Mathis and José Feliciano. In addition, he co-penned "Almost There", a successful single for Andy Williams, plus "How Does It Go?" recorded in 1965 by Ricky Nelson, and "Turn-Down Day", a hit for The Cyrkle in 1966.

In the film arena, Keller wrote soundtrack music for I Saw What You Did (1965) and Angel in My Pocket (1969). He also wrote "The Legend of Shenandoah", recited by James Stewart in the 1965 film Shenandoah.

Keller went on to be a number-one-call vocalist for television jingles throughout the 1970s and 1980s. He also maintained a long working association with songwriter/filmmaker Joe Brooks, performing Brooks' song "Rock and Roll Music" in the 1974 film The Lords of Flatbush, and appearing in Brooks' films You Light Up My Life (1977) and If Ever I See You Again (1978).

== Personal life ==
Keller is married and has two children.

== See also ==
- List of one-hit wonders in the United States
- List of one-hit wonders on the UK Singles Chart
- List of UK Singles Chart number ones of the 1950s
