= Morningtown Ride to Christmas =

Studio album by The Seekers
- Released: November 2001
- Recorded: May–June 2001
- Studio: Melbourne
- Genre: Easy listening, Christmas
- Label: Sony Music Australia

The Seekers chronology
1968 BBC Farewell Spectacular (1999)	Morningtown Ride to Christmas (2001)	Night of Nights... Live! (2002)

Morningtown Ride to Christmas is the twelfth studio and first Christmas album by Australian band, The Seekers. The album was recorded in Melbourne and released in November 2001 and was certified platinum in Australia.

The Seekers made two in-store appearances to promote the album in December at Mall Music, Sydney and Toombull Music, Brisbane. In 2019 the album was reissued under the title We Wish You a Merry Christmas, with a newly recorded version of the song "We Wish You a Merry Christmas" as track one, followed by the tracks from the original album.

== Track listing ==
1. "Morningtown Ride (To Christmas)" – 2:37
2. "Mary Had A Baby" – 3:46
3. "Santa Claus Is Coming to Town" – 3:22
4. "Silent Knight" – 4:01
5. "Have Yourself a Merry Little Christmas" – 3:55
6. "When a Child is Born" – 2:58
7. "Jingle Bells – 2:43
8. "Once in Royal David's City" – 3:15
9. "The Little Drummer Boy" – 3:24
10. "There Are No Lights on Our Christmas Tree" – 4:21
11. "The First Noël" – 3:58
12. "Rudolph the Red-Nosed Reindeer" – 2:51
13. "Away in a Manger" – 3:53
14. "O Come, All Ye Faithful" – 3:18
15. "Children, Go Where I Send Thee" – 5:03

== Charts ==
Chart (2001)	Peak position
Australian Albums (ARIA)	18

== Certifications ==
Region	Certification	Certified units/sales
Australia (ARIA)	Platinum	70,000^{^}
^{^} Shipments figures based on certification alone.
