= Turn-Down Day =

Single by the Cyrkle

from the album Red Rubber Ball
- B-side: "Big Little Woman"
- Released: July 1966
- Genre: Folk rock
- Length: 2:29
- Label: Columbia
- Songwriters: Jerry Keller, David Blume
- Producer: John Simon

The Cyrkle singles chronology
"Red Rubber Ball" (1966)	"Turn-Down Day" (1966)	"Please Don't Ever Leave Me" (1966)

"Turn-Down Day" is a song written by Jerry Keller and David Blume and performed by the Cyrkle. It was produced by John Simon, and was featured on their 1966 album, Red Rubber Ball. It reached No. 16 on both the Billboard Hot 100 and the Canadian pop chart, and also hit No. 18 on the U.S. Cashbox chart in 1966.

== Background ==
According to Candy Leonard, author of Beatleness: How the Beatles and Their Fans Remade the World (Arcade, 2014), the song is an excellent example of the emerging hippie ethos of the 1960s.

== Other versions ==
- Dino, Desi & Billy, on their 1966 album, Souvenir.
- Bobby Vee, on his 1966 album, Look at Me Girl.
- Normie Rowe, as a single in 1967 that reached No. 46 in Australia.
- Gary Lewis & the Playboys, on their 1968 album, Close Cover Before Playing.
- Twinn Connexion, as a B-side to their 1968 single "I Think I Know Him"; also featured on the album, Twinn Connexion.
- Steve and Eydie, on their 1970 album, Man and a Woman.
- Danny Bonaduce, on his 1972 eponymous album.
- Sketch Show, on their 2002 album, Audio Sponge.
