= Jesus Is a Soul Man =

Single by Lawrence Reynolds

"Jesus Is a Soul Man" is a hit single by the American country singer Lawrence Reynolds. The song was co-written by Reynolds and Jack Cardwell. The track appeared in the 1970 Reynolds album released also as Jesus Is a Soul Man. The album peaked at No. 45 on the U.S. Country Albums chart in 1970.

== Chart performance ==
The single was released in 1969, reaching No. 28 on the U.S. Billboard Hot 100 chart and No 10 in Australia.

== Covers ==
"Jesus Is a Soul Man" has been covered by a great number of artists:

- It was covered very notably by Hank Williams Jr in his 1969 album Sunday Morning
- Johnny Rivers in a 1970 single release, as the B-side to "Into the Mystic." Rivers' version of "Jesus Is a Soul Man" was later included in his compilation album Summer Rain: The Essential Rivers (1964-1975).
- Conway Twitty on his 1973 album Clinging to a Saving Hand.
- Darrell Adams in The Adams Family 1970 album Bridge Over Troubled Water.
- Roy Clark in his 1975 album Gospel: Songs of Strength.

== Adaptations ==
- The song "Schuhe Schwer Wie Stein" in German uses the same melody of "Jesus Is a Soul Man". Johnny Rivers' German release of "Jesus is a Soul Man" was titled "Jesus Is a Soul Man (Schuhe Schwer Wie Stein)" and released as a bilingual English / German song.

== Popular culture ==
- Johnny Cash performed the song live as a duet with Reynolds in May 1970 on The Johnny Cash Show.
