= Lawrence Reynolds =

American singer-songwriter

Lawrence Reynolds (July 13, 1944 – August 15, 2000) was an American country singer. He had a hit single with "Jesus Is a Soul Man" in 1969, which hit No. 28 on the US Billboard Hot 100 chart. "Jesus Is a Soul Man" was co-written by Jack D Cardwell. He released an album in 1970, also called Jesus Is a Soul Man, which peaked at No. 45 on the U.S. Country Albums chart in 1970.

Reynolds was born in St. Stephens, Alabama. He died of coronary artery disease on August 15, 2000, and was buried at Three Forks Baptist Church in Bigbee, Alabama.

== Discography ==
=== Albums ===
Year	Album	Peak positions
Year	Album	US Billboard Top Country Albums
1969	Gee I Sure Am Blue	-
1969	Country Pop And Soul	-
1970	Jesus Is a Soul Man	45
2003	He Comes From Alabama	-
2012	Plain & Simple Truth	-

=== Singles ===
Year	Single	Peak positions		Album
Year	Single	US Billboard Hot 100	AUS	Album
1969	"Jesus Is a Soul Man"	28	10	Jesus Is a Soul Man
1970	"It Was Love"	139*	-	Single only
1970	"Doing His Thing"	-	-	Single only
1970	"Hey Mr. Preacher"	-	-	Single only
1972	"Love Can Be A Drag (Sometimes)"	-	-	Single only

- Note: US Record World singles chart
