= Live On (The Seekers album) =

Studio album by The Seekers
- Released: 17 April 1989
- Recorded: 1988/89
- Genre: Pop, Folk, World
- Label: Polydor Records

The Seekers chronology
An Hour Of The Seekers (1988)	Live On (1989)	Ideal (1990)

Live On is the tenth studio album from The Seekers. The album is the only Seekers' album to feature the vocals of Australian singer Julie Anthony.

== Background ==
In October 1988, The Seekers re-formed and sang "The Carnival is Over" to close the World Expo 88 in Brisbane. The lead singer of The Seekers, Judith Durham was not available and was replaced by Julie Anthony. Following the performance, the group signed with Polydor Records and re-recorded some of the group's biggest hits with Anthony's vocals, along with several new songs written by group member Bruce Woodley.

== Track listing ==
CD track listing

1. Prelude "Live On"
2. "The Streets of Serenade"
3. "I'll Never Find Another You"
4. "Georgy Girl"
5. "Building Bridges"
6. "Love Is Me, Love Is You"
7. "Come the Day"
8. "The Carnival Is Over"
9. "One Step Forward, Two Steps Back"
10. "Some Day One Day"
11. "Taking My Chances With You"
12. "Morningtown Ride"
13. "Time and Again"
14. "Keep A Dream In Your Pocket"
15. "Here I Am"
16. "A World of Our Own"
17. "How Can A Love So Wrong Be So Right"
18. "Sparrow Song"
19. "House of Cards"
20. "Red Rubber Ball"
21. "When Will the Good Apples Fall"
22. "Live On"

== Charts ==
Chart (1989)	Peak position
Australian Albums (ARIA)	26

== Certifications ==
Region	Certification	Certified units/sales
Australia (ARIA)	Gold	35,000^{^}
^{^} Shipments figures based on certification alone.
