= Giving and Taking =

Studio album by the Seekers
- Released: July 1976
- Genres: Pop, folk, world, country
- Labels: Astor, Polydor
- Producers: Bruce Woodley Keith Potger, John Farrar

The Seekers chronology
The Seekers (1975)	Giving and Taking (1976)	Collector Series - The Seekers (1977)

Giving and Taking is the eighth studio album by Australian group the Seekers. The album was released in 1976 and is the second studio album to feature the vocals of Louisa Wisseling. The album peaked at number 5 in New Zealand.

The album produced the singles "Where in the World?" (April 1976) and "Giving and Taking" (June 1976).

== Track listing ==
All tracks composed by Bruce Woodley; except where indicated

Side A

1. "Friends" - 3:38
2. "The Rose and the Briar" (Woodley, John Farrar) - 3:53
3. "Giving and Taking" - 3:07
4. "A Part of You" - 3:32
5. "Country Lanes" (Barry Gibb, Robin Gibb) - 3:03

Side B

1. "Country Rose" - 3:27
2. "Holding On" (Woodley, Farrar) - 2:53
3. "If I Could Write a Fairy Tale" (Keith Potger, James Mason) - 3:23
4. "A Finer Country Day" - 3:40
5. "Standing on Shaky Ground" (Woodley, Farrar) - 3:58
6. "Where in the World"(Woodley, Farrar) - 3:43

== Weekly charts ==
Chart (1976)	Peak position
Australian Kent Music Report Albums Chart	78
New Zealand Albums (RMNZ)	5
