= Swagman Restaurant =

Coordinates: 37°53′18″S 145°17′21″E

Restaurant information
- Established: 1972
- Closed: 1991
- Location: Melbourne, Australia

A close-up of the Swagman sign

The Swagman Restaurant was a restaurant in Ferntree Gully, Melbourne, Australia, which opened in 1972 and was destroyed by fire in 1991. The restaurant was famous in Melbourne for its long-running television commercials, cabaret shows, and smorgasbord.

The Swagman was located on Burwood Highway, Ferntree Gully. It was owned by Bastiaan (Basil) and Ina De Jong. An unusually large establishment, The Swagman eventually had a capacity of 1,200 seats and covered 20,000 square metres, and was noted for attracting buses of tourists from rural and international locations, especially Japan.

== Entertainment ==
The floor shows, featuring dancers, singers, and other acts, were quite unique in Melbourne at that time. The shows changed every three months. Choreographers included Peggy Rush, Coral Deague, Jan Rogers, and Jodie Greenwood. Greenwood was a dancer and performer at the Swagman for 14 years, and was the choreographer from 1979 until 1991, when the restaurant burnt down. She featured in all the television commercials for the restaurant, which played on late-night commercial television for many years. Performers who played at the venue included Frank Amorosi (father of Vanessa Amorosi), David Gould, Dean Lotherington, Sean Martin Hingston, Debbie Reynolds, Robert Goulet, the Mills Brothers, Dr. Hook, Pilita Corrales, and the Village People. Paul Sheean at age 16 was the youngest singer to perform full-time in the cabaret floorshow.

== Fire ==
The Swagman burnt down at around 4:30am on 27 May 1991. The fire was front-page news in Melbourne. The insurance firm Royal Insurance alleged arson and refused to pay the $7 million claim made by the owners of the restaurant, who then sued for the amount. The case was confidentially settled in October 1992. After the settlement, however, the owners were sued by the ANZ Bank, who also alleged arson. The restaurant was not rebuilt after the fire. The owners sold the property, on which the Stylus nightclub was then built. The new owners hired Basil De Jong to manage the nightclub.

== See also ==
- List of restaurant in Australia
