= The Seekers =

Australian folk-pop and gospel group

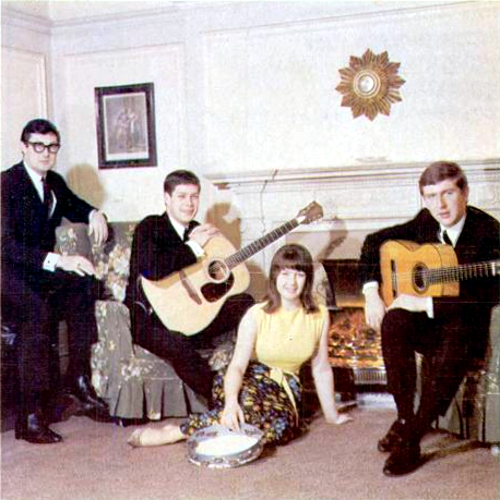
- The Seekers in 1965 (l-r): Athol Guy, Keith Potger, Judith Durham, Bruce Woodley

Background information
- Origin: Melbourne, Victoria, Australia
- Genres: Easy-listening, Pop, Folk, Gospel
- Years active: 1962–1968, 1975–1988, 1992–2022
- Labels: W&G, EMI, Columbia, Astor, Decca Records, World Record Club
- Past members: Athol Guy; Keith Potger; Bruce Woodley; Judith Durham; Ken Ray; Louisa Wisseling; Buddy England; Peter Robinson; Julie Anthony; Karen Knowles; Rick Turk; Cheryl Webb
- Website: theseekers.com.au

The Seekers were an Australian folk pop and gospel band originally formed in Melbourne in 1962. They were the first Australian pop band to achieve major chart and sales success in the United Kingdom and the United States. They were especially popular during the 1960s, with their best-known configuration of Judith Durham on vocals, piano and tambourine; Athol Guy on double bass and vocals; Keith Potger on twelve-string guitar, banjo and vocals; and Bruce Woodley on guitar, mandolin, banjo and vocals.

The group had Top 10 hits in the 1960s with "I'll Never Find Another You", "A World of Our Own", "Morningtown Ride", "Someday, One Day", "Georgy Girl" and "The Carnival Is Over". Australian music historian Ian McFarlane described their style as "concentrated on a bright, uptempo sound, although they were too pop to be considered strictly folk and too folk to be rock". In 1967, they were named as joint "Australians of the Year" – the only group thus honoured. In July 1968, Durham left to pursue a solo career, and the group disbanded. Keith Potger formed a new group in the UK, the New Seekers; they had their first hit single in 1971 with "I'd Like to Teach the World to Sing".

In 1995, the Seekers were inducted into the ARIA Hall of Fame. "I'll Never Find Another You" was added to the National Film and Sound Archive of Australia's Sounds of Australia registry in 2011. Woodley's and Dobe Newton's song "I Am Australian", which was recorded by the Seekers as well as Durham with Russell Hitchcock and Mandawuy Yunupingu, has become an unofficial Australian anthem. With "I'll Never Find Another You" and "Georgy Girl", the group also achieved success in the United States, but not nearly at the same level as in the rest of the world. The Seekers have sold over 50 million records worldwide and were individually honoured as Officers of the Order of Australia in the Queen's Birthday Honours of June 2014.

== Early years ==
The Seekers were formed in 1962 in Melbourne by Athol Guy on double bass, Keith Potger on twelve-string guitar, and Bruce Woodley on guitar. Guy, Potger, and Woodley had all attended Melbourne Boys High School in Victoria. In the late 1950s, Potger led the Trinamics, a rock 'n' roll group, Guy led the Ramblers and, joining with Woodley, they decided to form a doo-wop music group, the Escorts. The Escorts had Ken Ray as the lead singer, and in 1962 they became "The Seekers". Ray left the group to get married. His place was taken by Judith Durham, an established traditional jazz singer who added a distinctive female lead voice. She had earlier recorded an extended play disc on W&G Records with the Melbourne group Frank Traynor's Jazz Preachers.

Durham and Guy had met when they both worked in an advertising agency – initially Durham only sang periodically with the Seekers, when not performing at local jazz clubs. She was replaced in Traynor's jazz ensemble by Margret RoadKnight. The Seekers performed folk-influenced pop music and soon gathered a strong following in Melbourne. Durham's connections with W&G Records led to the group's later signing a recording contract with the label. Their debut album, Introducing the Seekers, was released in 1963. Their debut single, released in mid-1963, was the African American spiritual song "Kumbaya". Their second single was the traditional historic Australian bush ballad from 1894, "Waltzing Matilda", which appeared in November and which reached the Melbourne "Top 40" singles chart. and peaked at number 74 on the national chart. When being photographed for the album's cover, Potger was replaced by Ray – his day job with the Australian Broadcasting Commission (ABC) as a radio producer barred him from involvement in a commercial enterprise.

== Discovery in the United Kingdom ==
The Seekers were offered a twelve-month position as on-board entertainment on the Sitmar Line passenger cruise ship Fairsky in March 1964. In May, they travelled to the UK and had intended to return to Australia after staying ten weeks, but upon arrival they were offered work by a London booking agency, the Grade Organisation. They signed there with World Record Club and issued a single, "Myra", co-written by the group. The group regularly appeared on a British TV show series, "Call in on Carroll", hosted by Ronnie Carroll.

After filling in on a bill headlined by singer Dusty Springfield, they met her brother, songwriter and producer Tom Springfield, who had experience with writing folk-pop material and lyrics/tunes with the siblings' earlier group The Springfields. He penned "I'll Never Find Another You", which they recorded in November 1964. It was released by EMI Records, on their Columbia Graphophone Company (Columbia) label, in December and was championed by the offshore radio station "Radio Caroline" which frequently played and promoted their music. Despite the fact that the group had not signed a contract with EMI, the single reached the UK "Top 50" and began selling well. In February 1965, it reached No.1 in the UK and Australia, and No.4 in the United States where it was released on EMI's Capitol Records label. "I'll Never Find Another You" was the seventh biggest-selling single in Britain for 1965 though their own "The Carnival Is Over", released later in the year, would eventually eclipse it – and went on to sell 1.75 million copies worldwide.

The Seekers were the first Australian pop group to have a Top 5 hit in Australia, the UK and the US. Australian music historian Ian McFarlane described their style as "concentrated on a bright, uptempo sound, although they were too pop oriented to be considered strictly folk and too folk to be rock". The distinctive soprano voice of Durham, the group's vocal harmonies, and memorable songs encouraged the British media, including the national broadcasting agency on radio and television, the BBC, to give them exposure, allowing them to appeal to a broad cross-section of the young British folk, pop, and rock music audience.

== String of hits ==
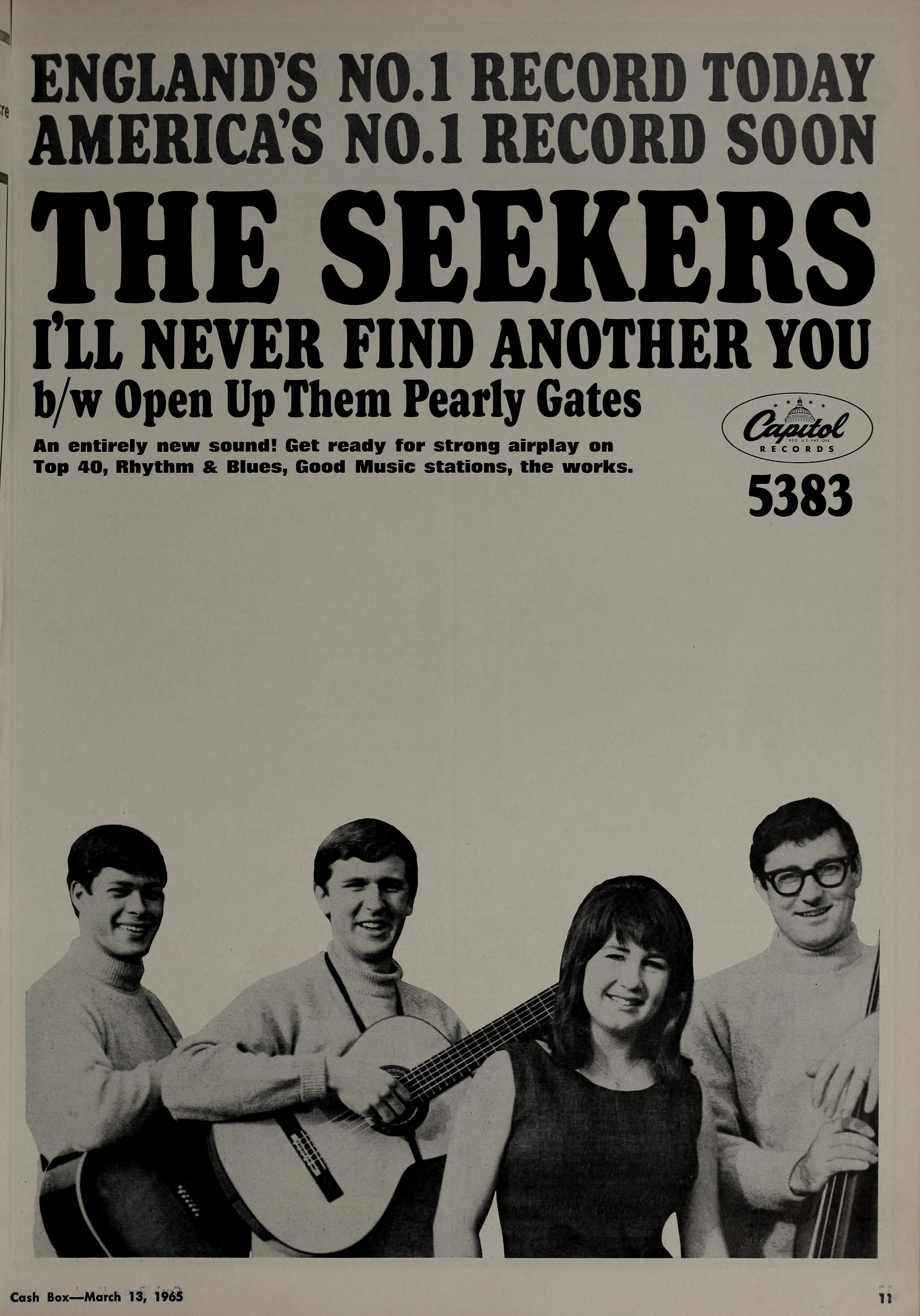
Cashbox advertisement, March 13, 1965

The Seekers achieved their first success in the United States in 1965 with their hit "I'll Never Find Another You" reaching peaks of No. 4 for pop and No. 2 for easy listening on Billboard magazine charts. They followed "I'll Never Find Another You" with the protest song, "What Have They Done to the Rain?" in February 1965, which did not chart in the Top 40.

The group were named "Best New Group of 1964" at the April 1965 New Musical Express Poll Winners Awards. They appeared at the annual celebratory Wembley Empire Pool concert, on a bill which included the Beatles, the Rolling Stones, Dusty Springfield and the Animals. In May, another Tom Springfield composition was issued, "A World of Our Own", which reached Top 3 in Australia and the UK and Top 20 in the US. Malvina Reynolds' lullaby "Morningtown Ride" was issued in Australia in July and peaked in the Top 10. That same month, Durham had to temporarily leave the group due to emergency nasal surgery; she was replaced on live dates from July to early September by Scottish-born singer Ellen Wade.

Durham quickly returned to the group, and their next single, "The Carnival Is Over", appeared in November 1965. The melody is based on a Russian folk song, while the lyrics were written by Tom Springfield; it reached No. 1 on both the Australian and the UK charts and, at its peak, the single was selling around 93,000 copies a day in the UK alone. However, although "The Carnival Is Over" became a signature song for the group, it was not a great success in North America, peaking at No. 105 in the US and missing the Canadian charts completely.

On 16 November 1965, they appeared at a Royal Command Performance at the London Palladium before Queen Elizabeth The Queen Mother.

Also in 1965, the group met Paul Simon, of the American duo Simon & Garfunkel, before the success of "The Sound of Silence", who was pursuing a solo career in the UK following the initial poor chart success of the duo's debut LP, Wednesday Morning, 3 A.M.. Being an itinerant folk singer in London, he met Bruce Woodley (Of the Seekers), and they co-wrote the million-selling "Red Rubber Ball". It became an American No. 2 single for an American group, the Cyrkle.

The Seekers' version was provided on their 1966 album Come the Day (released on the album titled Georgy Girl in the US). Later, in 1966, the Seekers released the Simon-penned "Someday One Day", which reached No. 4 in Australia and No. 11 in the UK. Their version was Simon's first UK success as a songwriter and his first major hit as a composer separately from his work with Art Garfunkel. He and Woodley co-wrote two more songs together. Afterwards, however, Woodley's relationship with Simon deteriorated and Woodley later struggled to get his share of the royalties — for example, his songwriting credit on another song, "Cloudy" was omitted from the release of Parsley, Sage, Rosemary and Thyme, and his royalties not paid. Woodley and Simon stopped working together due to these royalty problems and creative differences, and the collaborations ended after that.

Early in 1966, after returning to Australia, the Seekers filmed their first TV special, At Home with the Seekers. In November, a re-recorded version of "Morningtown Ride" was released in the UK which reached No. 2. The song had been recorded earlier as an Australian single on the 1964 album Hide and Seekers and appeared on the 1965 American debut, The New Seekers.

In December 1966 they issued "Georgy Girl", which became their highest charting American hit when it reached No. 2 on the Billboard Hot 100 and No. 1 on the Cashbox Top 100 in February 1967. It was the title song and theme for the British film of the same name starring Lynn Redgrave and James Mason and sold 3.5 million copies worldwide. They were awarded a gold record certificate by the Recording Industry Association of America. Meanwhile, it was No. 3 in the UK and No. 1 in Australia. Its writers, Jim Dale and Tom Springfield, were nominated for the 1967 Academy Award for Best Original Song of 1966, but the Oscar was won by the title song of the film Born Free.

In February 1967, "Morningtown Ride" reached the Top 50 in the US.

== Return to Australia and breakup ==
In March 1967, the Seekers returned to Australia for a homecoming tour, which included a performance for Music for the People at the Sidney Myer Music Bowl in Melbourne, attended by an estimated audience of 200,000. The Guinness Book of World Records (1968) listed it as the greatest attendance at a concert in the Southern Hemisphere. Melburnians were celebrating the annual Moomba festival, a free community festival, and many thousands were enjoying other attractions but are included in the crowd estimate. The Seekers were accompanied during their 20-minute set by the Australian Symphony Orchestra, conducted by Hector Crawford. Film of their appearance was incorporated into their 1967 Australian television special, The Seekers Down Under, which was screened on Channel 7 and drew a then record audience of over 6 million. It was also screened in the UK on BBC1 on 24 June 1968, and repeated on 27 December 1968.

In January 1968, on Australia Day, in recognition of its achievements, the group was named joint Australians of the Year – the only group of people to have this honour bestowed upon them. They personally accepted their awards from John Gorton, the Prime Minister of Australia, during their tour. During this visit, the group filmed another TV special, The World of the Seekers, which was screened in cinemas before being screened nationally on Channel 9 to high ratings and is in the Top 10 most watched TV shows of the 20th century in Australia.

On 14 February 1968, during the New Zealand tour, Durham approached the other group members to announce that she was leaving the Seekers to pursue a solo career and the group subsequently disbanded. Their final performance was on 7 July 1968, and was shown on BBC One as a television special called Farewell the Seekers, with an audience of more than 10 million viewers. The special had been preceded by a month-long season at London's Talk of the Town nightclub and a live recording of one of their shows was released as a live album, Live at the Talk of the Town. It reached No. 2 on the UK charts. Also in July, the compilation album The Seekers' Greatest Hits was released and spent 17 weeks at No. 1 in Australia. It was released as The Best of The Seekers in the UK and spent six weeks at No. 1 in 1969, managing to knock The Beatles (White Album) off the top of the charts and preventing the Rolling Stones' Beggars Banquet from reaching the top spot. The album spent 125 weeks in the charts in the UK.

== Reunions in the 1970s and 1980s ==
Following the Seekers' split, Durham pursued a solo career. She released a Christmas album called For Christmas with Love (recorded in Hollywood, California) and later signed with A&M Records, releasing more albums including Gift of Song and Climb Ev'ry Mountain. Guy hosted his own TV show in Australia, A Guy Called Athol, before entering politics in 1973, as a member of the Liberal Party. In 1969, Potger formed and managed a new group, the New Seekers, in the UK who also charted highly with their successful song "I'd Like to Teach the World to Sing (In Perfect Harmony)". Woodley released several solo albums and focused on songwriting, including co-writing the patriotic song "I Am Australian" with Dobe Newton (of the Bushwackers) in 1987.

From 1972, Guy, Potger and Woodley planned on reforming the Seekers without Durham. By 1975 they had recruited Louisa Wisseling, a semi-professional folk singer formerly with Melbourne group the Settlers. They had a top 10 Australian hit with the Woodley-penned "The Sparrow Song". Woodley left the group in June 1977 and was replaced by Buddy England, a former 1960s pop singer and member of the Mixtures. In 1978, Guy was replaced by Peter Robinson (ex-the Strangers) and Cheryl Webb replaced Wisseling as lead vocalist, leaving only Keith Potger from the original Seekers line-up. In 1980 the group released an album, A little bit of Country, and toured periodically until the mid '80s. In 1988, Guy, Potger and Woodley reformed the Seekers with Julie Anthony, a cabaret singer. In May, the group sang "The Carnival Is Over" at the World Expo 88 in Brisbane. In March 1989, the group released the album Live On, which peaked in the top 30 on the Australian Recording Industry Association (ARIA) Albums Chart. In June 1990, Anthony left and was replaced by Karen Knowles, a former teen pop singer on Young Talent Time. However the distinctive timbre and strength of Durham's voice was missing from their sound and the group split again.

== 1990s, 2000s and 2010s ==

The Seekers reunited late in 1992, with the classic line-up of Durham, Guy, Potger and Woodley. In March 1992, all four had met together for the first time in 20 years at a restaurant in Toorak, an inner suburb of Melbourne. Before then they had never talked about reforming; they just wanted to get to know each other again. It was two months later that they decided to do a reunion concert, which led to a 102-date tour. The 25-Year Silver Jubilee Reunion Celebration tour in 1993 was sufficiently successful that the group continued to perform and record together, on and off, until shortly before Judith Durham's death in August 2022. From 1993 until 2022 they staged several sell-out tours of Australia, New Zealand and the UK. The group issued several new albums, including the studio albums Future Road in October 1997 (which peaked at No. 4 on the ARIA Albums Chart) and Morningtown Ride to Christmas (which reached the top 20 in 2001). Both albums were certified platinum.

In 1995, the group was inducted into the ARIA Hall of Fame. In the build up to the Sydney 2000 Summer Olympics, an ABC TV satire, The Games, parodied the Seekers in the final episode, "The End". Durham had suffered a broken hip and sang "The Carnival Is Over" in a wheelchair at the closing ceremony of the related Paralympic Games on 29 October. Long Way to the Top was a 2001 Australian Broadcasting Corporation six-part documentary on the history of Australian rock and roll from 1956 to the modern era. The Seekers featured on the second episode, "Ten Pound Rocker 1963–1968", broadcast on 22 August, in which Durham and Woodley discussed their early work on a cruise ship, meeting Tom Springfield and their success in Britain. Four of their songs were played during the episode: "I'll Never Find Another You", "The Carnival Is Over", "A World of Our Own" and "Georgy Girl".

In October 2002, on the 40th anniversary of their formation, they were the subjects of a special issue of Australian postage stamps. On 1 September 2006, they were presented with the Key to the City by Melbourne's Lord Mayor, John So. In February 2009, the SBS TV program RocKwiz hosted a 50th anniversary concert at the Myer Music Bowl, RocKwiz Salutes the Bowl, which included "World of Our Own" performed by Rebecca Barnard and Billy Miller and "The Carnival Is Over" by Durham.

In 2004 a DVD, The Seekers at Home and Down Under, was released. It consists of a 1966 television documentary on the Seekers and a 1967 special. The cover includes a photo from the 1966 documentary.

In October 2010, The Best of the Seekers (1968) was listed in the book 100 Best Australian Albums. Also in October, they were scheduled to tour various Australian cities in support of violinist André Rieu and his orchestra. However, the tour was postponed when Rieu was taken ill. They released another Greatest Hits compilation in May 2011 which peaked in the top 40. That month they supported Rieu on the rescheduled Australian tour. "I'll Never Find Another You" was added to the National Film and Sound Archive of the Sounds of Australia registry in 2011. "The Seekers' Golden Jubilee Tour" kicked off 2013 in May, celebrating fifty years since the group had formed in December 1962. Performing in Sydney, Brisbane, Newcastle and Melbourne, they received rave reviews to sold-out audiences. However, Judith Durham suffered a brain haemorrhage after their first concert in Melbourne. The rest of the Australian tour and later-to-be-staged UK tour were postponed; the former continued in November, while the UK tour took place in May and June 2014, ending with two performances at the Royal Albert Hall, London.

In November 2015, during a tour of Guy's new group, Athol Guy and Friends, featuring Jenny Blake on vocals, the group were joined by Potger and Woodley for a one-performance fundraiser hosted by the school. The performance featured many of the Seekers' hits as well as other songs that had influenced them over the years. The performance closed with a performance of "I Am Australian", which Guy introduced as a song that was pertinent given "what was happening around the world" at the time.

In 2015, they were inducted into the Music Victoria Hall of Fame.

In April 2019, the Seekers released Farewell, a live recording from their 2013 50th anniversary tour. Following Durham's retirement from live performance, the group continued as "The Original Seekers" with the addition of long-time producer and guitarist and singer Michael Cristiano as the group's "fourth voice". In June 2019, they released a new studio album titled Back to Our Roots also produced by Michael Cristiano. The album features Guy, Potger and Woodley joining with Cristiano on songs they had sung prior to Durham's tenure with the group. The album was released with "The Original Seekers" as the group's name.

== 2020s ==
On 28 April 2020, Universal Music Australia announced that a trilogy of Seekers' compilation albums would be released over the following twelve months under the title Hidden Treasures, featuring rarities and lost classics. Hidden Treasures – Volume 1 was released on 22 May 2020 and peaked at number 21 on the ARIA Charts. Volume 2 was released October the same year.

In a 2021 interview, Keith Potger said the group members were considering ways to commemorate their 60th anniversary, in 2022.

On 5 August 2022, Judith Durham died from bronchiectasis, a chronic lung disease, at The Alfred Hospital in Melbourne, aged 79. She was cremated.

The Seekers' final recording together, "Carry Me", was unveiled by Athol Guy at Durham's state memorial service. Written by Bruce Woodley, the song was completed by Woodley, Potger and Guy adding their vocals and instrumentation to Durham's vocals.

== Members ==
=== Current members ===
- Athol Guy – double bass, backing vocals (1962–1968, 1975–1978, 1988–2022)
- Keith Potger – lead guitar, banjo, backing and lead vocals (1962–1968, 1975–1985, 1988–2022)
- Bruce Woodley – rhythm guitar, banjo, backing and lead vocals (1962–1968, 1975–1977, 1988–2022)
- Michael Cristiano – lead and backing vocals, rhythm guitar (2019–2022)

=== Former members ===
- Judith Durham – lead and backing vocals, piano (1962–1968, 1992–2019; died 2022)
- Julie Anthony – lead and backing vocals (1988–1990)
- Buddy England – guitars, backing vocals (1977–1980)
- Karen Knowles – lead and backing vocals (1991)
- Ken Ray – vocals, guitar (1962)
- Peter Robinson – bass, backing vocals (1978–1986)
- Rick Turk – guitars, piano, backing and lead vocals (1981–1986)
- Ellen Wade – vocals (June–August 1965)
- Cheryl Webb – lead and backing vocals (1977–1986)
- Louisa Wisseling – lead and backing vocals (1975–1977)

== Million sellers ==
The following recordings by the Seekers were each certified as having sold over one million copies: "I'll Never Find Another You", "A World of Our Own", "The Carnival Is Over" and "Georgy Girl"; all were written or co-written by Tom Springfield and were each awarded a gold disc. The Seekers have sold over 50 million records worldwide.

== Notable performances ==
- 1965 – The Seekers won the Best New Group in the New Musical Express Poll Winners Awards and performed on 11 April at the Wembley Empire Pool, on a bill that included the Beatles, the Rolling Stones, Cliff Richard and Dusty Springfield. Archive footage from this show was included in the Seekers' 2014 50th anniversary tour.
- 1965 – In June the Seekers performed in the United States on The Ed Sullivan Show singing "A World of Our Own" and "You Can Tell The World".
- 1966 – In November the Seekers performed at a Royal Command Performance at the London Palladium before the Queen Mother.
- 1967 – The Seekers made another appearance on The Ed Sullivan Show singing "Georgy Girl".
- 1967 – The Seekers represented Australia at Expo 67 in Montreal, Quebec, Canada (when they appeared on television in Australia via the first satellite transmission from the United States to Australia).
- 1967 – On the 12th of March, at Sidney Myer Music Bowl in Melbourne, The Seekers played to an estimated 200,000 people in a televised concert celebrating their overseas success.

== Television specials ==
- 1965 – An Evening with The Seekers
- 1966 – The Seekers at Home
- 1967 – The Seekers Down Under and The World of The Seekers
- Four television mini-specials titled A Date with the Seekers
- 1968 – 1968 BBC Farewell Spectacular
- 2019 – ABC Television's Australian Story
- 2019 – SBS Television screens the Decca DVD Farewell Album (trimmed to about one hour)

== Discography ==
=== Studio albums ===
- Introducing the Seekers (W & G, 1963)
- The Seekers (also known as Roving with the Seekers) (W & G, 1964)
- Hide & Seekers (also known as The Four and Only Seekers and The New Seekers) (W & G, 1964)
- A World of Our Own (also known as The Seekers) (Columbia, 1965)
- Come the Day (also known as Georgy Girl) (Columbia, 1966)
- Seekers Seen in Green (Columbia, 1967)
- The Seekers (Astor, 1975)
- Giving and Taking (Astor, 1976)
- A Little Bit of Country (Hammard, 1980)
- Live On (1989)
- Future Road (EMI, 1997)
- Morningtown Ride to Christmas (2001)

=== Live albums ===
- Live at the Talk of the Town (Columbia, 1968) UK: 2
- 25 Year Reunion Celebration (with Judith Durham) (1993) AUS: 9, UK: 93
- 1968 BBC Farewell Spectacular (1999) AUS: 12
- Night of Nights... Live! (2002) AUS: 26
- Farewell (2019) AUS: 3
- The Carnival of Hits Tour 2000 (Reissue of Night of Nights... Live!) (2019)
- Live in the UK (2021)

=== Charting compilation albums ===
- The Seekers Sing Their Big Hits (1965) AUS: 3
- Introducing the Seekers Big Hits (1967) AUS: 5
- The Seekers' Greatest Hits (1968) AUS: 1
- The Best of The Seekers (1968) UK: 1
- The Carnival is Over (1969) AUS: 17
- Something Old/ Something New (1984) AUS 55
- The Silver Jubilee Album (1993) AUS: 3
- A Carnival of Hits (1994) UK:7
- The Best of The Seekers (1997) AUS: 45
- Greatest Hits (2009) UK: 34, AUS: 31
- The Golden Jubilee Album (2012) AUS: 10
- Hidden Treasures – Volume 1 (2020) AUS: 21
- Hidden Treasures – Volume 2 (2020) AUS: 56

=== CD box sets ===
- The Seekers Complete [5CD] (1995) AUS: 17
- Treasure Chest [3CD] (1997) AUS: 7
- All Bound for Morningtown [4CD] (2009) NZ: 36

== See also ==
- List of songs recorded by The Seekers
