= The Cyrkle =

American rock band

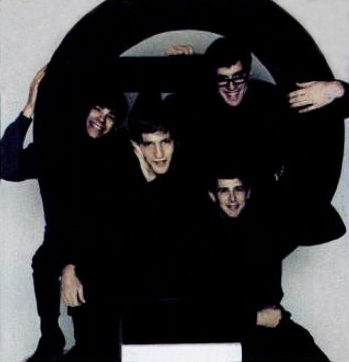
- The Cyrkle in 1967, left to right: Michael Losekamp, Marty Fried, Don Dannemann, Tom Dawes

Background information
- Also known as: The Rhondells
- Origin: Easton, Pennsylvania, U.S.
- Genres: Pop, rock
- Years active: 1961–1968, 2016–present
- Labels: Columbia; Big Stir Records
- Members: Don Dannemann; Michael Losekamp; Pat McLoughlin; Don White; Scott Langley; Dean Kastran
- Past members: Tom Dawes; Earl Pickens; Marty Fried; Mike Shoaf; Michael "Roscoe" Rousculp

The Cyrkle is an American rock band active from the early to late 1960s and since 2016. The group has charted two Top 40 hits, "Red Rubber Ball" and "Turn-Down Day".

== Career ==
The band was formed by guitarists and lead singers Don Dannemann and Tom Dawes (who also played bass guitar), and Jim Maiella (the original drummer), who all met while studying at Lafayette College in Easton, Pennsylvania. Dannemann enlisted in the US Coast Guard in 1966. The other members were Earle Pickens on keyboards and Marty Fried on drums. They were originally a "frat rock" band called the Rhondells but were later discovered and managed by Brian Epstein, who was best known as manager of the Beatles. Epstein found out about the band when his business partner, New York attorney Nathan Weiss, heard them in Atlantic City, New Jersey, on Labor Day of 1965. Epstein became their manager and renamed them, as a reference to the circular roundabout known as Centre Square, located in downtown Easton. John Lennon provided the unique spelling of their new name. They were produced by John Simon.

In mid-1966, they opened on 14 dates for the Beatles during their US tour. On August 28, they headed the opening acts performing prior to the Beatles at Dodger Stadium. The other artists who appeared were Bobby Hebb, the Ronettes, and the Remains. Before touring with the Beatles, the Cyrkle had an engagement at the Downtown Discothèque in New York City. They were also on the bill for the final Beatles (paid) concert at Candlestick Park on August 29, 1966.

The Cyrkle is best known for their 1966 song "Red Rubber Ball", which went to No. 2 on the Billboard Hot 100 chart. It sold over one million copies, and was awarded a gold disc. It was co-written by Paul Simon, of Simon & Garfunkel, and Bruce Woodley of the Seekers, and was released by Columbia Records. Later in 1966, the band had one more Top 20 hit, "Turn-Down Day" (No. 16). After the release of their debut album, Red Rubber Ball, they recorded a second album, Neon, in late 1966, and a movie soundtrack, The Minx, in 1967 (not released until 1969). They followed that with various singles and then disbanded in mid-1968.

Both Dawes and Dannemann became professional jingle writers after the Cyrkle disbanded. Dawes wrote the "plop plop fizz fizz" jingle for Alka-Seltzer. Dannemann wrote jingles for Continental Airlines and Swanson Foods. He penned the original 7 Up "Uncola" song. Dawes produced two albums for the band Foghat, Rock & Roll (1973) and Energized (1974), and co-wrote the song "Wild Cherry" on the latter. Marty Fried left the music business to attend law school and graduated from Wayne State University in Detroit in 1972. He worked as a bankruptcy attorney in suburban Detroit. Earle Pickens became a surgeon (since retired) in Gainesville, Florida.

== Revival ==
In the spring of 2014, the keyboardist of The Cyrkle, Mike Losekamp, joined a Columbus, Ohio-based band called The Gas Pump Jockeys, a regionally popular classic rock act performing in the Ohio region and neighboring states.

Joining band members Pat McLoughlin (guitarist/vocalist), Scott Langley (drummer), Don White (lead guitarist) and initially bassists Rick Brown (d. 2015) and later Mike "Roscoe" Rousculp (d. 2019), the band immediately incorporated the Cyrkle's two biggest hit songs, "Red Rubber Ball" and "Turn Down Day" into their show featuring Losekamp on lead vocals. The songs became a highlight of each show the Gas Pump Jockeys performed.

Buoyed by the crowd's responses and a growing audience, McLoughlin elected to pursue the possibility of merging with surviving members of the original Cyrkle for a possible 50th anniversary reunion tour. This mission proved to be more daunting than anticipated. Losekamp had had no communications with any of his bandmates since The Cyrkle disbanded in 1968, following the death of Brian Epstein the prior year. The original lineup had retired from being rock musicians and established professional careers living and working in various parts of the United States. They had only performed together twice as a band (without Losekamp), once in 1986, in support of the Hands Across America event, and a second time in 1988, when they performed at their college reunion in Easton, Pennsylvania. Although they remained on friendly terms with each other, they rarely communicated over the next 50 years.

Locating the original members to discuss a reunion was challenging for McLoughlin as he searched every state east of the Mississippi River for surviving members. He eventually located original drummer Marty Fried, now a lawyer, living in the lower peninsula of Michigan. He also found keyboardist Earl Pickens, who had established himself as a surgeon in north Florida. In both instances, their very valuable careers were not conducive for being in the revised Cyrkle. The Cyrkle's original bass player, Tom Dawes, who had had a subsequent career as a jingle writer, had died in 2007. So, McLoughlin set his sights on locating the band's original singer and lead guitarist Don Dannemann.

Dannemann had established his own advertising jingle company (Mega-Music) in New York City in the early 1970s. In 2008, he shut down his business, moved away from New York City and was enjoying life as a retiree. He would occasionally perform in a duet, but for all practical purposes his musical career lay dormant. After months of failed attempts, McLoughlin at last located him in the latter part of the summer of 2016. He brokered a call with Losekamp, resulting in the first conversation with the two bandmates in 50 years to occur. Losekamp explained the mission of trying to reunite the Cyrkle, and Dannemann expressed his interest in the project.

Following a pair of conference calls in which McLoughlin explained the business model to all members, Dannemann agreed to travel to Columbus, Ohio, to reconnect with Losekamp and to meet the other members of his Central Ohio band. He and the band quickly bonded, both musically and on a personal level. He agreed to join the other members of the Gas Pump Jockeys to form a new version of The Cyrkle featuring himself and Losekamp.

The Cyrkle performed for the first time to a live audience for the filming of a promotional video, and to record a live album (Full Cyrkle) in November 2016. They performed professionally for the first time in five decades three months later in February 2017 in Columbus, Ohio. On October 13, 2017, The Cyrkle began touring nationally, starting in Lakewood, New Jersey, typically appearing with other classic rock contemporaries from the 1960s music era. As of 2022. they continue to perform across the US.

The reformed lineup, beginning in 2016, featured original members Don Dannemann and Michael Losekamp, joined by Pat McLoughlin, Mike Rousculp (d. 2019), Don White, Scott Langley, and later Mike Shoaf (2019–2021). Dean Kastran, a founding member of The Ohio Express, joined the band in June 2021.

Marty Fried died of pancreatic cancer on September 1, 2021, at age 77. He was a retired bankruptcy lawyer who practiced in Southfield, Michigan, a suburb of Detroit.

The group's 2024 album Revival on the Big Stir label featured "We Were There".

== Members ==
- Tom Dawes – (born July 25, 1943, Albany, New York – died October 13, 2007, New York) – lead vocals, lead guitar, bass
- Don Dannemann – (born May 9, 1944, Brooklyn, New York) – lead vocals, rhythm guitar
- Marty Fried – (born Martin Fried, 1944, Wayside, New Jersey, died September 1, 2021, Southfield, Michigan) drums, vocals
- Earle Pickens – keyboards (first album) – (1969 to present, a general surgeon in Gainesville, Florida)
- Michael Losekamp – (September 8, 1946, Dayton, Ohio) keyboards, vocals (second & third albums); (retired engineer for AT&T)
- Pat McLoughlin – (born June 23, 1952, Columbus, Ohio) – vocals, rhythm guitar, percussion
- Don White – (born April 30, 1953, Columbus, Ohio) – lead guitar, vocals
- Scott Langley – (West Jefferson, Ohio) – drums, vocals
- Mike Shoaf – (born June 29, 1951, Columbus, Ohio) – bass guitar, vocals
- Mike "Roscoe" Rousculp – (born May 30, 1949, Lima, Ohio – died May 16, 2019, Tipp City, Ohio) – bass guitar, vocals
- Dean Kastran – (born October 22, 1948, Mansfield, Ohio) – bass guitar, vocals

== Discography ==
=== Singles ===
Year	Titles (A-side, B-side) Both sides from same album except where indicated	Record label	Peak chart positions			Album
Year	Titles (A-side, B-side) Both sides from same album except where indicated	Record label	US Billboard	US Cashbox	Canada RPM	Album
1966	"Red Rubber Ball" b/w "How Can I Leave Her"	Columbia 43589	2	3	1	Red Rubber Ball
1966	"Turn-Down Day" b/w "Big Little Woman"	Columbia 43729	16	18	16	Red Rubber Ball
1966	"Please Don't Ever Leave Me" b/w "Money to Burn" (from Red Rubber Ball)	Columbia 43871	59	50	31	Neon
1967	"I Wish You Could Be Here" b/w "The Visit (She Was Here)"	Columbia 43965	70	57	46	Neon
1967	"Camaro" b/w "SS 396" (by Paul Revere & The Raiders); Promotional single created exclusively for Chevrolet dealers	Columbia Special Products 466	–	–	–	Non-album tracks
1967	"We Had a Good Thing Goin'" b/w "Two Rooms" (from Neon)	Columbia 44018	72	65	69	Non-album tracks
1967	"Penny Arcade" b/w "The Words"	Columbia 44224	95	61	53	Non-album tracks
1967	"Turn of the Century" b/w "Don't Cry, No Fears, No Tears Comin Your Way" (from Neon)	Columbia 44366	112	–	–	Non-album tracks
1968	"Reading Her Paper" b/w "Friends"	Columbia 44426	–	–	–	Non-album tracks
1968	"Red Chair Fade Away" b/w "Where Are You Going"	Columbia 44491	–	–	–	Non-album tracks

=== Reissue single ===
- 1966 – "Red Rubber Ball"/"Turn-Down Day"

=== Albums ===
Original albums

Year	Album	Billboard 200	Cashbox	Record label
1966	Red Rubber Ball	47	32	Columbia Records
1967	Neon	164	81	Columbia Records
1970	The Minx (1967 soundtrack)	–	–	Flying Dutchman Records
1991	Red Rubber Ball (A Collection)	–	–	Columbia/Legacy Records
2017	Full Cyrkle (live)	–	–	Independent release
2024	Revival	–	–	Big Stir Records

=== Compact disc re-issues ===
- 1991 – Red Rubber Ball (A Collection) – Columbia Legacy 47717
- 2001 – Red Rubber Ball – Sundazed SC 11108
- 2001 – Neon – Sundazed 11109

Both reissues feature the original album tracks plus outtakes, demos, and non-LP singles tracks.
