= Red Rubber Ball =

- Dutch picture sleeve

Single by the Cyrkle

from the album Red Rubber Ball
- B-side: "How Can I Leave Her"
- Released: April 4, 1966
- Recorded: February 12, 1966
- Genre: Pop; bubblegum pop
- Length: 2:22
- Label: Columbia
- Songwriters: Paul Simon, Bruce Woodley
- Producer: John K. Simon

The Cyrkle singles chronology
"Parking in the Kokomo" (1965)	"Red Rubber Ball" (1966)	"Turn-Down Day" (1966)

"Red Rubber Ball" is a song by the American rock band the Cyrkle. Written by Bruce Woodley of The Seekers and Paul Simon, the song reached number two on the US Billboard Hot 100. It also reached number two in South Africa and New Zealand, and it topped the charts in Canada.

== Synopsis ==
"Red Rubber Ball" is sung from the perspective of a person whose relationship and/or friendship has just been ended by their partner or friend, respectively. The song teaches that - when people use you, mistreat you, and ignore you, "there are other starfish in the sea", and it is best to move on. Namely, the other person did not care for them in the first place, using them only as something for their pride.

== Recordings ==
According to Cyrkle guitarist Tom Dawes, Simon offered "Red Rubber Ball" to the band when they were opening for Simon and Garfunkel on tour. The song's tracks were recorded in stereo, with the bass, lead guitar, and percussion on the right track, acoustic guitar and electric organ on left, and the vocals on both.

The Seekers also recorded "Red Rubber Ball" for their 1966 album Come the Day (called Georgy Girl in the USA). It also appears on the CD box set The Seekers Complete.

In an interview on The Colbert Report, Paul Simon said he wrote "Red Rubber Ball" while living in England to get a £100 advance from The Seekers. This came in response to Colbert's request for Simon to name a song that was "on the cusp" when it came to being included in his songbook Lyrics 1964–2008.

In the US, "Red Rubber Ball" spent a single week at No. 2 on the Billboard Hot 100 pop singles chart at the same time "Paperback Writer" by the Beatles was at No. 1, during the week ending July 9, 1966. It was the fifth week during 1966 in which songs written by Simon and by John Lennon and Paul McCartney were simultaneously at No. 1 and No. 2 on the chart.

== Collaboration ==
Before the success of "The Sound of Silence", Paul Simon was an itinerant folk singer in London. There, he met Bruce Woodley of the Seekers, and they co-wrote "Red Rubber Ball". Simon gifted the Seekers with the song "Someday, One Day" and he and Woodley wrote two more songs together. Afterwards, however, Woodley's relationship with Simon deteriorated and Woodley later struggled to get his share of the royalties— for example, his songwriting credit on another song, "Cloudy", was completely omitted from the release of Parsley, Sage, Rosemary and Thyme, and his royalties stolen. Woodley and Simon stopped working together due to these royalty problems and creative differences, and the collaborations ended after that.

== Cover versions ==
- Neil Diamond on his 1966 debut album The Feel of Neil Diamond.
- Cliff Richard for his 1968 film soundtrack Two a Penny.
- The Seekers on their 1966 album Come the Day
- Del Shannon on his 1966 album Total Commitment.
- Mel Tormé on his 1966 album Right Now!
- Cilla Black on her 1969 album Surround Yourself with Cilla.
- Canadian punk rock group The Diodes had it as the first track on their debut album, The Diodes (1977). According to the liner notes of the 1998 Diodes anthology, Tired of Waking Up Tired, the band recorded the cover because Paul Simon had been vocal in his disapproval of punk rock music.
- The short-lived bluegrass supergroup Spectrum (Bela Fleck, Jimmy Gaudreau, Mark Schatz, and Glenn Lawson) on their 1980 debut Opening Roll.
- Simon and Garfunkel recorded a live version in 1967 that was not released until their 1997 compilation album Old Friends.
- Grammy nominated Polka music artist, Lenny Gomulka, recorded a cover with his award winning Polka band, Lenny Gomulka and Chicago Push, on their 1998 album Push It To The Limit.
- Eggchair recorded a version that was played in the 2004 movie, Dodgeball: A True Underdog Story.
- American ska punk group Streetlight Manifesto for their 2010 album, 99 Songs of Revolution.
- Nellie McKay on her 2015 album My Weekly Reader.
