= Australian pop music awards =

Australian music awards before 1987

Australian pop music awards are a series of inter-related national awards that gave recognition to popular musical artists and have included the Go-Set pop poll (1966–1972); TV Week King of Pop Awards (1967–1978); TV Week and Countdown Music Awards (1979–1980); the Countdown Awards (1981–1982) and Countdown Music and Video Awards (1983–1987). Early awards were based on popular voting from readers of teenage pop music newspaper Go-Set and television program guide TV Week. They were followed by responses from viewers of Countdown, a TV pop music series (1974–1987) on national broadcaster Australian Broadcasting Corporation (ABC). Some of the later award ceremonies incorporated listed nominees and peer-voted awards. From 1987 the Australian Recording Industry Association (ARIA) instituted its own peer-voted ARIA Music Awards.

== 1966–1972:Go-Set pop poll results ==
Go-Set Awards
- Country: Australia
- Presented by: Go-Set
- First award: 1966
- Final award: 1972

The pop music newspaper, Go-Set, which was first published in February 1966, conducted an annual poll of its readers from 1966 to 1972 to determine the most popular personalities in various categories. Readers were provided with coupons to vote for their choices, with initial categories being "Male Vocal", "Female Vocal" and "Group", for both Australian and International acts. In later years, new categories were introduced and old ones renamed or retired.

=== 1966 ===
Printed in Go-Set on 5 October 1966, pages 12 & 13.

Australian acts: pop poll results
Position	Male Vocal	Female Vocal	Group
1	Normie Rowe	Lynne Randell	The Easybeats
2	Ronnie Burns	Dinah Lee	The Twilights
3	Merv Benton	Denise Drysdale	Purple Hearts
4	Mike Furber	Little Pattie	Steve & the Board
5	Billy Thorpe	Donna Gaye	The Id
6	Johnny Young	Pat Carroll	The Aztecs
7	Tony Barber	Yvonne Barrett	MPD Ltd
8	Jeff St John	Marcia Jones	The Playboys
9	Colin Cook	Laurel Lea	The Loved Ones
10	Ray Brown	Joy Lemmon	Bobby & Laurie

International acts: pop poll results
Position	Male Vocal	Female Vocal	Group
1	Elvis Presley	Cilla Black	The Beatles
2	Normie Rowe	Petula Clark	The Rolling Stones
3	Roy Orbison	Dusty Springfield	The Easybeats
4	Tom Jones	Nancy Sinatra	Herman's Hermits
5	P. J. Proby	Sandie Shaw	The Troggs / The Jordanaires
6	Gene Pitney	Dinah Lee	The Troggs / The Jordanaires
7	Crispian St. Peters	Dionne Warwick	The Animals
8	Cliff Richard	Marianne Faithfull	The Kinks
9	Bob Dylan	Cher	The Who
10	Donovan	Brenda Lee	The Lovin' Spoonful

=== 1967 ===
Printed in Go-Set on 9 August 1967, pages 12 & 13. Categories were renamed, e.g. Male Vocal became Top Male Singer.

Australian acts: pop poll results
Position	Top Male Singer	Top Female Singer	Top Group
1	Ronnie Burns	Lynne Randell	The Easybeats
2	Normie Rowe	Bev Harrell	The Twilights
3	Johnny Young	Cheryl Gray	The Groop
4	Phil Jones	Dinah Lee	The Loved Ones
5	Mike Furber	Little Pattie	The Masters Apprentices
6	Robbie Snowden	Yvonne Barrett	The Cherokees
7	Marty Rhone	Denise Drysdale	The Vibrants
8	Buddy England	Marcia Jones	Phil Jones Unknown Blues Band
9	Jeff St John	Donna Gaye	Jackson
10	Billy Thorpe	Judy Stone	James Taylor Move

International acts: pop poll results
Position	Top Male Singer	Top Female Singer	Top Group
1	Tom Jones	Petula Clark	The Beatles
2	Elvis Presley	Sandie Shaw	The Monkees
3	Normie Rowe	Nancy Sinatra	The Rolling Stones
4	Jimi Hendrix	Dusty Springfield	The Easybeats
5	Cliff Richard	Cilla Black	The Who
6	P.J. Proby	Lynne Randell	The Jordanaires
7	Eric Burdon	Sandy Posey	The Mamas and the Papas
8	Scott Engel	Marianne Faithfull	The Animals
9	Cat Stevens	Aretha Franklin	Procol Harum
10	Gene Pitney	Tina Turner	Herman's Hermits

=== 1968 ===
Printed in Go-Set on 19 June 1968, pages 12 & 13.

Australian acts: pop poll results
Position	Top Male Singer	Top Female Singer	Top Group
1	Normie Rowe	Bev Harrell	The Twilights
2	Johnny Farnham	Lynne Randell	The Masters Apprentices
3	Ronnie Burns	Dinah Lee	The Groove
4	Phil Jones	Little Pattie	Somebody's Image
5		Cheryl Gray	The Easybeats
6	Marty Rhone	Marcie Jones	Procession
7	Graeme Willington	Janice Slater	Dave Miller Set
8	Peter Doyle	Judy Durham	The Groop
9	Robbie Snowden	Denise Drysdale	Bee Gees
10	Jon Blanchfield	Laurel Lea	Heart 'n' Soul

International acts: pop poll results
Position	Top Male Singer	Top Female Singer	Top Group
1	Tom Jones	Lulu	The Beatles
2	Paul Jones	Sandie Shaw	The Monkees
3	Elvis Presley	Petula Clark	The Bee Gees
4	Cliff Richard	Aretha Franklin	Jimi Hendrix Experience
5	Otis Redding	Dusty Springfield	Cream
6	Jimi Hendrix	Cilla Black	Small Faces
7	Normie Rowe	Nancy Sinatra	The Rolling Stones
8	Donovan	Lynne Randell	The Who
9	Engelbert Humperdinck	Bobbie Gentry	The Jordanaires
10	Scott Engel	Dionne Warwick	The Easybeats

=== 1969 ===
Printed in Go-Set on 28 June 1969, pages 10 & 12. Categories back to original names, e.g. Top Male Singer returns to Male Vocal.

Australian acts: pop poll results
Position	Male Vocal	Female Vocal	Group
1	Russell Morris	Allison Durbin	Zoot
2	Johnny Farnham	Anne Hawker	The Masters Apprentices
3	Ronnie Burns	Bev Harrell	Brisbane Avengers
4	Normie Rowe	Wendy Saddington	The Dream
5	Jeff Phillips	Lynne Randell	Flying Circus
6	Dave Miller	Patti	Town Criers
7	Jonne Sands	Yvonne Barrett	Dave Miller Set
8	Ross D. Wyllie	Pat Carroll	Doug Parkinson in Focus
9	Doug Parkinson	Marcie Jones	The Valentines
10	Alex Kadell	Dinah Lee	The Groove

International acts: pop poll results
Position	Male Vocal	Girl Vocal	Group
1	Tom Jones	Lulu	The Beatles
2	Elvis Presley	Mary Hopkin	The Monkees
3	Donovan	Aretha Franklin	The Bee Gees
4	Davy Jones	Julie Driscoll	The Rolling Stones
5	Barry Ryan	Cilla Black	Cream
6	Peter Sarstedt	Dusty Springfield	The Hollies
7	Jimi Hendrix	Sandie Shaw	The Jordanaires
8	Paul Jones	Dionne Warwick	The Animals
9	Jose Feliciano	Diana Ross	Union Gap
10	Bob Dylan	Petula Clark	Diana Ross & The Supremes

=== 1970 ===
Printed in Go-Set on 11 July 1970, pages 6 & 7. New categories introduced: Guitarist, Drummer, Composer. Ceremony for the Australian acts was held at Dallas Brooks Hall, East Melbourne, and was broadcast on 30 June by Seven Network.

Australian acts: pop poll results
Position	Male	Girl	Group	Guitarist	Drummer	Composer
1	Johnny Farnham	Allison Durbin	The Masters Apprentices	Doug Ford	Colin Burgess	Johnny Young
2	Russell Morris	Wendy Saddington	Axiom	Ricky Springfield	John Dien	Jim Keays, Doug Ford
3	Ronnie Burns	Colleen Hewett	New Dream	Billy Green	Rick Brewer	Hans Poulsen
4	Alex Kadell	Liv Maessen	Town Criers	Rod Harris	Stewie Speers	Russell Morris
5	Normie Rowe	Yvonne Barrett	Zoot	Glenn Wheatley	Chris Easterby	Ricky Springfield
6	Issi Dye	Pat Carroll	The Valentines	John du Bois	Peter Reed	Billy Green
7	Jeff St John	Bev Harrell	The Sect	John Farrar	Paddy Beach	John Brownrigg
8	Doug Parkinson	Little Pattie	Doug Parkinson in Focus	Sam Dunnin	Paul Doo	Sam Dunnin
9	Ronnie Charles	Kerrie Biddell	The Flying Circus	Phil Manning	Don Lebler	Lindsay Bjerre
10	Ross D. Wyllie	Bernadette Cavanagh	Jeff St John & Copperwine	Doug Rowe	Colin Walker	Don Mudie & Brian Cadd

International acts: pop poll results
Position	Male	Girl	Group	Guitarist	Drummer	Composer
1	Tom Jones	Mary Hopkin	The Beatles	Eric Clapton	Ringo Starr	Paul McCartney
2	Elvis Presley	Lulu	Led Zeppelin	Jimmy Page	Ginger Baker	John Lennon, Paul McCartney
3	Paul McCartney	Diana Ross	Creedence Clearwater Revival	Jose Feliciano	John Bonham	John Lennon
4	Donovan	Julie Driscoll	The Rolling Stones	George Harrison	Keith Moon	Bob Dylan
5	Glen Campbell	Cilla Black	The Hollies	Paul McCartney	Micky Dolenz	Jimmy Webb
6	Neil Diamond	Janis Joplin	The Monkees	Jimi Hendrix	Charlie Watts	Burt Bacharach
7	Mick Jagger	Bobbie Gentry	Shocking Blue	Hank B. Marvin	Doug Clifford	Paul Simon
8	Bob Dylan	Dionne Warwick	Beach Boys	John Lennon	Dave Clark	John Fogerty
9	Jose Feliciano	Dusty Springfield	Herman's Hermits	Elvis Presley	Dennis Wilson	Harry Nilsson
10	Robert Plant	Aretha Franklin	The Jackson 5	Mick Taylor	Mitch Mitchell	Donovan

=== 1971 ===
Printed in Go-Set on 10 July 1971, pages 2 & 3. New categories introduced: Best Album, Best Single, Best Bass Guitarist.

Australian acts: pop poll results
Position	Best Male Vocal	Best Girl Vocal	Best Group	Best Guitarist	Best Drummer	Best Songwriter / Composer	Best Album	Best Single	Best Bass Guitarist
1	Johnny Farnham	Allison Durbin	Daddy Cool	Ricky Springfield	Colin Burgess	Russell Morris	Choice Cuts – The Masters Apprentices	"Eleanor Rigby" – Zoot	Glenn Wheatley
2	Russell Morris	Liv Maessen	The Masters Apprentices	Doug Ford	Rick Brewer	Johnny Young	Natural High – Hans Poulsen	"Eagle Rock" – Daddy Cool	Beeb Birtles
3	Ronnie Burns	Colleen Hewett	Zoot	Phil Manning	Gary Young	Hans Poulsen	Virgo – Ronnie Burns	"Mr. America" – Russell Morris	Wayne Duncan
4	Ted Mulry	Wendy Saddington	Chain	Ross Hannaford	Mark Kennedy	Ricky Springfield	The Hoax Is Over – Billy Thorpe & the Aztecs	"Black & Blue" – Chain	Barry Sullivan
5	Hans Poulsen	Jenny Johnston	Spectrum	Denis Wilson	Barry Harvey	Jim Keays, Doug Ford	Spectrum Part One – Spectrum	"I'll Be Gone" – Spectrum	Duncan McGuire
6	Darryl Cotton	Yvonne Barrett	New Dream	John Robinson	Dannie Davidson	Ross Wilson	Kamahl – Kamahl	"Because I Love You" – The Masters Apprentices	John du Bois
7	Jim Keays	Olivia Newton-John	Autumn	Ross Wilson	Chris Easterby	Mike Rudd	Looking Through a Tear – Johnny Farnham	"Soft Delight" – New Dream	Mark Demajo
8	Ross D. Wyllie	Little Pattie	The Mixtures	Lobby Loyde	Peter Reed	Matt Taylor	Wide Open – Kahvas Jute	"Falling in Love Again" – Ted Mulry	Bill Putt
9	Matt Taylor	Dawn Dixon	Town Criers	Billy Thorpe	Stewie Speers	Ted Mulry	At the Mountains of Madness – Blackfeather	"Acapulco Sun" – Johnny Farnham	Rick Graham
10	Doug Parkinson	Marian Henderson	Blackfeather	Billy Green	Jim Yonge	John Robinson	Pirana – Pirana	"The Freak" – Zoot	Paul Wheeler

International acts: pop poll results
Position	Best Male Vocal	Best Girl Vocal	Best Group	Best Guitarist	Best Drummer	Best Songwriter / Composer	Best Album	Best Bass Guitarist
1	Elvis Presley	Janis Joplin	Creedence Clearwater Revival	Eric Clapton	Ringo Starr	Paul McCartney	All Things Must Pass – George Harrison	Paul McCartney
2	Tom Jones	Melanie	The Rolling Stones	George Harrison	Ginger Baker	George Harrison	Mad Dogs and Englishmen – Joe Cocker	Stu Cook
3	Joe Cocker	Mary Hopkin	The Partridge Family	Jimmy Page	Doug Clifford	John Lennon	Pendulum – Creedence Clearwater Revival	Andy Fraser
4	Elton John	Freda Payne	Deep Purple	John Fogerty	John Bonham	Elton John, Bernie Taupin	That's the Way It Is – Elvis Presley	John Paul Jones
5	George Harrison	Diana Ross	The Beatles	Ritchie Blackmore	Ian Paice	John Fogerty	Pearl – Janis Joplin	Roger Glover
6	David Cassidy	Lynn Anderson	Led Zeppelin	Peter Townshend	Simon Kirke	Neil Diamond	Deep Purple in Rock – Deep Purple	Jack Bruce
7	Paul McCartney	Aretha Franklin	Jackson Five	Paul Kossoff	Charlie Watts	Bob Dylan	John Lennon/Plastic Ono Band – John Lennon	Bill Wyman
8	Neil Diamond	Lulu	Free	Jimi Hendrix	Keith Moon	James Taylor	The Partridge Family Album – The Partridge Family	Klaus Voormann
9	James Taylor	Olivia Newton-John	The Hollies	Alvin Lee	Mick Avory	Cat Stevens	Tumbleweed Connection – Elton John	John Entwistle
10	Mick Jagger	Cilla Black	The Who	Paul McCartney	Michael Shrieve	Burt Bacharach	Elton John – Elton John	Noel Redding

=== 1972 ===
Printed in Go-Set on 30 December 1972, pages 5 & 6. New category introduced: Newcomer (only for Australian acts); with old categories retired: Best Guitarist, Best Drummer, Best Bass Guitarist.

Australian acts: pop poll results
Position	Male	Female	Group	Songwriter	Album	Single	Newcomer
1	Johnny Farnham	Colleen Hewett	Sherbet	Brian Cadd	Aztecs Live at Sunbury – Billy Thorpe & the Aztecs	"Boppin' the Blues" – Blackfeather	Robin Jolley
2	Russell Morris	Allison Durbin	Billy Thorpe & the Aztecs	Rick Springfield	Beginnings – Rick Springfield	"You're All Woman" – Sherbet	Johnny Christie
3	Rick Springfield	Alison McCallum	Blackfeather	Russell Morris	Johnny Farnham Sings the Shows	"Most People I Know" – Billy Thorpe & the Aztecs	Glen Cardier
4	Jeff Phillips	Wendy Saddington	Spectrum	Mike Rudd	Milesago – Spectrum	"Rock Me Baby" – Johnny Farnham	Rick Springfield
5	Billy Thorpe	Jeannie Lewis	Daddy Cool	Johnny Young	Bloodstone – Russell Morris	"Walking the Floor on My Hands" – Johnny Farnham	Jamie Redfern
6	Jeff St John	Yvonne Barrett	Jigsaw	Jeff St John	Colleen Hewett – Colleen Hewett	"Esmerelda" – Indelible Murtceps	Greg Quill
7	Johnny Christie	Little Pattie	Country Radio	Ted Mulry	Mississippi – Mississippi	"Day by Day" – Colleen Hewett	Johnny Young
8	Brian Cadd	Jenny Ryle	Murtceps	Billy Thorpe	Sex, Dope, Rock'n'Roll: Teenage Heaven – Daddy Cool	"Gypsy Queen" – Country Radio	Jon English
9	Jamie Redfern	Mary	Mississippi	Hans Poulsen	Live with Friends	"When You Wish Upon a Star" – Jamie Redfern	G. Wayne Thomas
10	Johnny O'Keefe	Liv Maessen/Judy	New Dream	Kevin Borich/Phil Keys	Together – Johnny Farnham and Allison Durbin	"Hooky Jo" – Rick Springfield	Slim Newton

International acts: pop poll results
Position	Male	Female	Group	Songwriter	Album	Single
1	Cat Stevens	Carole King	The Rolling Stones	Cat Stevens	Teaser and the Firecat – Cat Stevens	"American Pie" – Don McLean
2	David Cassidy	Roberta Flack	The Bee Gees	Elton John	Thick As a Brick – Jethro Tull	"School's Out" – Alice Cooper
3	Elvis Presley	Melanie	Slade	Neil Diamond	Slade Alive! – Slade	"Take Me Bak 'Ome" – Slade
4	Joe Cocker	Janis Joplin	Creedence Clearwater Revival	Paul McCartney	Elvis: As Recorded at Madison Square Garden – Elvis Presley	"Puppy Love" – Donny Osmond
5	Rod Stewart	Karen Carpenter	Led Zeppelin	John Lennon	American Pie – Don McLean	"Long Cool Woman" – The Hollies
6	Elton John	Cilla Black	T. Rex	Rod Stewart	Cherish – David Cassidy	"Metal Guru" – T. Rex /"Run to Me" – Bee Gees
7	Mick Jagger	Aretha Franklin	Deep Purple	Don McLean	Honky Chateau – Elton John	"Metal Guru" – T. Rex /"Run to Me" – Bee Gees
8	Neil Diamond	Sonja Kristina	The Carpenters	John Fogerty	Machine Head – Deep Purple	"Morning Has Broken" – Cat Stevens
9	Marc Bolan	Olivia Newton-John	Jethro Tull	Bob Dylan	Exile on Mainstreet – The Rolling Stones	"Maggie May" – Rod Stewart /"Peace Train" – Cat Stevens /"Cherish" – David Cassidy
10	Leon Russell	Donna Fargo	The Partridge Family	Marc Bolan	—N/a	"Maggie May" – Rod Stewart /"Peace Train" – Cat Stevens /"Cherish" – David Cassidy

== 1967–1978: King of Pop Awards ==
Teen-oriented pop music newspaper, Go-Set was established in February 1966 and conducted an annual poll of its readers to determine the most popular personalities. In 1967 the most popular performer was Normie Rowe and when the results were televised on the unrelated The Go!! Show there was a crowning of Rowe as 'King of Pop'. In the following years, TV Week provided coupons for readers to vote for their choice, a similar system had been in use for TV's Logie Awards since 1960. The 'King of Pop' awards ceremony was broadcast by the 0–10 Network from 1967 to 1975, and from 1976 to 1978 by the Nine Network. On the 0–10 Network, from 1972, it was run by Johnny Young's production company (Lewis-Young Productions) which also provided Young Talent Time.

=== 1967 ===
- King of Pop – Normie Rowe

=== 1968 ===
- King of Pop – Normie Rowe

=== 1969 ===
- King of Pop – Johnny Farnham
- Best Female Artist (Note: 'Best Female Artist' Allison Durbin was popularly called 'Queen of Pop', however the first official 'Queen of Pop' was Colleen Hewett in 1972.) – Allison Durbin

Durbin is often referred to as the 'Queen of Pop', however:

I never in fact won a queen of pop award. the award was called The King of Pop awards, so that's when it was the Go Set [awards]. And it continued on to TV week.

— Allison Durbin, 19 October 2003, ABC-TV series Love is in the Air Episode 2: "She's Leaving Home"

=== 1970 ===
- King of Pop – Johnny Farnham
- Best Female Artist – Allison Durbin

=== 1971 ===
Ceremony details: Held on 22 October 1971 at ATV-0, Melbourne. Hosted by Johnny Young, Dal Myles, Ross D Wyllie, Jeff Phillips. Guest presenter: Liberace, Elton John
Award winners:

- King of Pop – Johnny Farnham
- Best Female Artist – Allison Durbin
- Best Album – Bloodstone (Russell Morris)
- Best Bass Guitarist – Beeb Birtles (Frieze)
- Best Dressed Female Performer – Allison Durbin
- Best Dressed Male Performer – Johnny Farnham
- Best Drummer – Gary Young (Daddy Cool)
- Best Group – Daddy Cool
- Best Lead Guitarist – Rick Springfield (Zoot)
- Best Organist – Jenny Johnson (New Dream)
- Best Songwriter – Russell Morris for "Mr America"
- Outstanding Newcomer (Note: 'Outstanding Newcomer' award was called 'Best New Talent' from 1972. Redfern won the TV Week Logie Award for 'Best New Talent' in 1972 for his performance at the 1971 King of Pop Awards and as an original member of Young Talent Time, Redfern signed a touring/recording contract with guest presenter Liberace.) – Jamie Redfern

=== 1972 ===
TV Week King of Pop Awards
- Country: Australia
- Presented by: TV Week
- First award: 1972
- Final award: 1978

Award winners:

- King of Pop – Johnny Farnham
- Queen of Pop – Colleen Hewett
- Best Arranger – Geoff Hales
- Best Dressed Female – Judy Stone
- Best Dressed Male – Jeff Phillips
- Best New Talent – Robin Jolley
- Best Songwriter – Billy Thorpe (Billy Thorpe & the Aztecs)
- Biggest Selling L.P. – Teaser and the Firecat (Cat Stevens)
- Biggest Selling Single – "The Rangers Waltz" (The Moms & Dads)
- Contribution to Teenage Television – Brian Henderson
- Most Popular Australian Album – When You Wish Upon a Star (Jamie Redfern)
- Most Popular Australian Musician – Rick Springfield (solo)
- Most Popular Australian Single – "Walking the Floor" (Johnny Farnham)
- Most Popular Group – Billy Thorpe & the Aztecs
- Most Popular Overseas Group – The Bee Gees
- Most Popular Overseas L.P. – American Pie (Don McLean)
- Special Gold Award for '20 years service to the Industry' – Johnny O'Keefe

=== 1973 ===
Guest presenter: Davy Jones (ex-The Monkees)
Award winners:

- King of Pop – Johnny Farnham
- Queen of Pop – Colleen Hewett
- Best New Talent – Linda George
- Best Songwriter – Brian Cadd
- Contribution to Australian Pop Industry – Brian Cadd
- Most Popular Australian Album – Hits 1: Magic Rock 'N' Roll (Johnny Farnham)
- Most Popular Australian Group – Sherbet
- Most Popular Australian Musician – Brian Cadd
- Most Popular Australian Single – "Venus" (Jamie Redfern)

=== 1974 ===
King of Pop '74–'75 Shows winners trophy.

Ceremony details: Held on 25 October 1974, guest presenters: David Cassidy, Gary Glitter. A compilation album titled King of Pop '74–'75 was released with tracks supplied by previous winners and guest presenters. Next to the list of various artists, the cover depicts the trophy that was presented to award winners.
Award winners:

- King of Pop – Jamie Redfern
- Queen of Pop – Debbie Byrne
- Best New Talent – Benjamin Hugg
- Best Songwriter – Harry Vanda & George Young
- Contribution to Australian Pop Industry – Brian Cadd
- Most Popular Australian Album – My Name Means Horse (Ross Ryan)
- Most Popular Australian Group – Sherbet
- Most Popular Australian Musician – Brian Cadd
- Most Popular Australian Single – "Hitch a Ride" (Jamie Redfern)

=== 1975 ===
Ceremony details: Held October 1975, live performance: AC/DC "High Voltage"
Award winners:

- King of Pop – Daryl Braithwaite (Sherbet)
- Queen of Pop – Debbie Byrne
- Australian Record of the Year – "Horror Movie" (Skyhooks)
- Best Australian Songwriter – Greg Macainsh (Skyhooks)
- Best New Talent – Mark Holden
- Contribution to Australian Pop Industry – Countdown
- Most Popular Australian Album – Ego is not a Dirty Word (Skyhooks)
- Most Popular Australian Group – Sherbet
- Most Popular Australian Single – "Summer Love" (Sherbet)

=== 1976 ===
Award winners:

- King of Pop – Daryl Braithwaite (Sherbet)
- Queen of Pop – Marcia Hines
- Best Australian International Performer – Olivia Newton-John
- Best Australian Record Producer – Richard Lush
- Best Australian Songwriter – Harry Vanda & George Young
- Best Australian TV Performer – Supernaut
- Best Cover Design – Straight in a Gay Gay World (Skyhooks)
- Contribution to Australian Pop Industry – Johnny O'Keefe
- Most Popular Australian Album – Howzat (Sherbet)
- Most Popular Australian Group – Sherbet
- Most Popular Australian Single – "Howzat" (Sherbet)
- Most Popular New Group – Supernaut
- Most Popular New Talent – Mark Holden

=== 1977 ===
Performer: Mark Holden
Award winners:

- King of Pop – Daryl Braithwaite (Sherbet)
- Queen of Pop – Marcia Hines
- Australian Record of the Year – "Help Is on Its Way" (Little River Band)
- Best Australian International Performers – Little River Band
- Best Australian Record Producer – Peter Dawkins
- Best Australian Songwriter – Glenn Shorrock
- Best Australian TV Performer – The Ferrets on Countdown
- Best Cover Design – Trees (Doug Ashdown)
- Most Popular Australian Album – Photoplay (Sherbet)
- Most Popular Australian Country Musician – Slim Dusty
- Most Popular Australian Group – Sherbet
- Most Popular Australian Single – "Magazine Madonna" (Sherbet)
- Most Popular New Group – Dragon
- Most Popular New Talent – John St Peeters

=== 1978 ===
Ceremony details: Held on 13 October 1978, hosted by Glenn Shorrock, guest presenters: Kate Bush, Leif Garrett
Award winners:

- King of Pop – John Paul Young
- Queen of Pop – Marcia Hines
- Australian Record of the Year – "Reminiscing" (Little River Band)
- Best Australian Record Producer – Harry Vanda & George Young
- Best Australian Songwriter – Harry Vanda & George Young
- Best Australian TV Performer – Skyhooks "Hotel Hell" on Nightmoves and Little River Band "Help Is on Its Way" on Paul Hogan Show
- Best Cover Design – Peter Ledger for the album cover of The Angels' Face to Face
- Most Popular Australian Album – Sleeper Catcher (Little River Band)
- Most Popular Australian Country Musician – Slim Dusty
- Most Popular Australian Group – Sherbet
- Most Popular Australian Single – "Love Is in the Air" (John Paul Young)
- Most Popular New Group – The Sports
- Most Popular New Talent – Paul O'Gorman
- Outstanding Contribution to Australian Music Industry – Nightmoves (Australian TV series)
- Outstanding Local Achievement – Dragon

== 1979–1980: TV Week/Countdown Music Awards ==
TV Week / Countdown Music Awards
- Country: Australia
- Presented by: TV Week, Countdown
- First award: 1980 (for 1979 works)
- Final award: 1981 (for 1980 works)

Countdown was an Australian pop music TV series on national broadcaster ABC-TV from 1974 to 1987, it presented music awards from 1979 to 1987, initially in conjunction with magazine TV Week which had sponsored the previously existing 'King of Pop' Awards. The TV Week/Countdown Rock Music Awards were a combination of popular-voted and peer-voted awards.

The award year below relates to the year of achievement and not the year they were presented.

=== 1979 ===
Ceremony details: Held on 13 April 1980, broadcast on Countdown by ABC-TV, the TV Week Rock Music Awards for 1979 presented a revamped awards ceremony with 'King of Pop' title replaced by 'Most Popular Male' and 'Queen of Pop' replaced by 'Most Popular Female'. Hosted by Glenn Shorrock of Little River Band, there were three live performances: Christie Allen "He's My Number One", Australian Crawl "Beautiful People" and Split Enz "I Got You". Various music industry personalities explained the categories, announced nominees and presented the 1979 awards. 'Most Popular' awards were voted for by readers of TV Week sending in printed coupons, with the three highest reader responses read out as nominations. Industry awards were voted for by radio programme directors, rock magazine editors and journalists. Presenters included Darryl Cotton, Richard Gower (Racey), John O'Keefe (son of Johnny O'Keefe), John Farnham, Colleen Hewett, Graeme Strachan, Ian "Molly" Meldrum, and Harry Casey (KC & the Sunshine Band).

Award winners and nominees:

- Best Australian Album
  - First Under the Wire – Little River Band
    - Breakfast at Sweethearts – Cold Chisel
    - Graffiti Crimes – Mi-Sex
    - Face to Face – The Angels
- Best Australian Single
  - "Computer Games" – Mi-Sex
    - "Lonesome Loser" – Little River Band
    - "The Nips Are Getting Bigger" – Mental As Anything
- Best New Talent (Johnny O'Keefe Memorial Award)
  - Mi-Sex
    - Christie Allen
    - Mental As Anything
- Best Recorded Songwriter
  - Terry Britten – "He's My Number One" by Christie Allen
    - Beeb Birtles & Graeham Goble – "I'm Coming Home" by Birtles & Goble
    - Don Walker – "Choirgirl" by Cold Chisel
- Countdown Producers Award (for continued co-operation, enthusiasm and professionalism)
  - The Angels
- Most Outstanding Achievement
  - Little River Band
    - Mike Brady
    - Jon English
    - The Sports
- Best Australian Producer
  - Peter Dawkins – Graffiti Crimes for Mi-Sex
- Best Australian Record Cover Design
  - Breakfast at Sweethearts – Cold Chisel
- Most Popular Album or Single
  - "Computer Games" – Mi-Sex
    - "Goosebumps" – Christie Allen
    - "Up There Cazaly" – The Two-Man Band
- Most Popular Female Performer
  - Christie Allen
    - Colleen Hewett
    - Marcia Hines
- Most Popular Group
  - Little River Band
    - Mi-Sex
    - Sherbs (a.k.a. Sherbet, Highway)
- Most Popular Male Performer
  - Jon English
    - Daryl Braithwaite
    - John Paul Young
- Best Disc Jockey (winners only, by State)
  - Ian McCray 2SM Sydney, New South Wales
  - Wayne Roberts 4BK Brisbane, Queensland
  - Steve Curtis 5AD Adelaide, South Australia
  - Jim Franklin 7HT Hobart, Tasmania
  - Greg Evans 3XY Melbourne, Victoria
  - Lionel Yorke 6PM Perth, Western Australia

=== 1980 ===
Ceremony details: Held on 16 March 1981 at Regent Theatre Sydney, and broadcast live to air on the same night, it was hosted by Countdown host Ian "Molly" Meldrum and international guests Suzi Quatro and Jermaine Jackson. Presenters included: Lee Simon, Donnie Sutherland, Marc Hunter, James Freud, Graham Russell, Russell Hitchcock and David Tickle. Performers were: Split Enz "History Never Repeats", Flowers "Icehouse", The Swingers "Counting the Beat", Air Supply "Lost in Love", "Every Woman in the World" and "All Out of Love", Australian Crawl "The Boys Light Up". Cold Chisel performed the last live number, "My Turn to Cry", to close the show and then trashed their instruments and the set. Sponsors TV Week withdrew their support for the awards and Countdown held its own awards ceremonies thereafter. The awards were voted by music industry sectors including, record companies major and independent, publishers, booking agents, radio stations and specific 'most popular' awards voted by the public.

Award winners and nominees:

- Best Australian Album
  - East – Cold Chisel
    - Icehouse – Flowers (later called Icehouse)
    - True Colours – Split Enz
- Best Single Record
  - "I Got You" – Split Enz
    - "Downhearted" – Australian Crawl
    - "State of the Heart" – Mondo Rock
- Best New Talent (Johnny O'Keefe Memorial Award)
  - Flowers (later called Icehouse)
    - The Dugites
    - INXS
    - Karen Knowles
- Most Outstanding Achievement (for excellence in the presentation or production of Australian rock music by an individual performer, group or group member)
  - Cold Chisel
    - Air Supply
    - Split Enz
- Best Recorded Song Writer
  - Don Walker – Cold Chisel
    - Iva Davies – Flowers/Icehouse
    - Neil Finn – Split Enz
- Best Australian Producer
  - Mark Opitz – East by Cold Chisel
    - Cameron Allan
    - Peter Dawkins
- Best Australian Record Cover Design
  - East – Cold Chisel
    - The Boys Light Up – Australian Crawl
    - Icehouse – Flowers
    - True Colours – Split Enz
- Most Popular Female
  - Christie Allen
    - Annalise Morrow (The Numbers)
    - Lynda Nutter (The Dugites)
- Most Popular Group
  - Cold Chisel
    - Australian Crawl
    - Split Enz
- Most Popular Male Performer
  - James Reyne (Australian Crawl)
    - Jimmy Barnes (Cold Chisel)
    - Jon English
- Most Popular Record
  - East – Cold Chisel
    - The Boys Light Up – Australian Crawl
    - True Colours – Split Enz
- Best Disc Jockey (winners only, by State)
  - Ian McCray 2SM Sydney, New South Wales
  - Wayne Roberts 4BK Brisbane, Queensland
  - Steve Curtis 5AD Adelaide, South Australia
  - Jim Franklin 7HT Hobart, Tasmania
  - Greg Evans 3XY Melbourne, Victoria
  - Garry Shannon 6 pm Perth, West Australia

== 1981–1986: Countdown Australian Music Awards ==
Countdown Music and Video Awards
- Country: Australia
- Presented by: Countdown
- First award: 1982 (for 1981 works)
- Final award: 1987 (for 1986 works)

Countdown was an Australian pop music TV series on national broadcaster ABC-TV from 1974 to 1987, it presented music awards from 1979 to 1987, initially in conjunction with magazine TV Week which had sponsored the previously existing 'King of Pop' Awards. After Cold Chisel performed at the 1980 awards ceremony, and then trashed their instruments and the set, sponsors TV Week withdrew their support and Countdown held its own awards ceremonies until the 1986 awards which were broadcast in 1987. The awards ceremony was co-produced by Carolyn James (a.k.a. Carolyn Bailey) during 1981–1984 in collaboration with the Australian Recording Industry Association (ARIA), which provided peer/industry voting for all awards except for "most popular" awards voted by the public Countdown provided coupons in the related Countdown Magazine for viewers to vote for some awards including 'Most Popular Male Performer', 'Most Popular Female Performer', 'Most Popular Group' and 'Most Popular International Act'. From 1987 ARIA instituted its own entirely peer-voted ARIA Music Awards.

The award year below relates to the year of achievement and not the year they were presented.

=== 1981 ===
Ceremony details: Broadcast on 18 April 1982, hosted by Ian "Molly" Meldrum with presenters: Greedy Smith, Ross Wilson, Michael Hutchence, Duran Duran, Sharon O'Neill, Renée Geyer, John Swan, John Paul Young, Daryl Braithwaite, Alex Smith and Angry Anderson. Performers were: Men at Work, Sharon O'Neill, Renée Geyer, Mental As Anything, Billy Field, Mondo Rock and the Divinyls.

Award winners and nominees:

- Best Australian Album
  - Chemistry – Mondo Rock
    - Cats & Dogs – Mental As Anything
    - Sirocco – Australian Crawl
- Best Australian Single
  - "If You Leave Me, Can I Come Too?" – Mental As Anything
    - "Boys in Town" – The Divinyls
    - "Cool World" – Mondo Rock
    - "Down Under" – Men at Work
- Best Australian Songwriter
  - Eric McCusker – Mondo Rock
    - Billy Field
    - Tim Finn – Split Enz
- Best Debut Album
  - Business as Usual – Men at Work
    - Bad Habits – Billy Field
- Best Debut Single
  - "Who Can It Be Now?" – Men at Work
    - "Boys in Town" – The Divinyls
- Best New Talent
  - Men at Work
    - The Divinyls
    - Moving Pictures
- Most Outstanding Achievement
  - Air Supply
- Best Australian Producer
  - Peter Dawkins
    - Peter McIan
    - Mark Moffatt
- Most Popular Female
  - Sharon O'Neill
    - Renee Geyer
    - Marcia Hines
- Most Popular Group
  - Australian Crawl
    - Men at Work
    - Split Enz
- Most Popular Male Performer
  - James Reyne (Australian Crawl)
    - Billy Field (solo)
    - Neil Finn (Split Enz)
- Most Consistent Live Act
  - Cold Chisel
    - The Angels
    - Mental As Anything
    - Midnight Oil
    - Mondo Rock

=== 1982 ===
Ceremony details: Held on 19 April 1983. The program opened with Goanna performing "Solid Rock". Nomination required product to be released. As Co-producer of the event, Carolyn James programmed The Reels to perform "Quasimodo's Dream" to much objection from Ian Meldrum. Tim Finn as presenter of Best Songwriter award introduced their performance: "Countdown has done some questionable things over the years, but this redeems all..Ladies and Gentlemen Dave Mason and the Reels 'Quasimodo's Dream"

Award winners and nominees:

- Best Australian Album
  - Time and Tide – Split Enz
    - Circus Animals – Cold Chisel
    - Primitive Man – Icehouse
    - Shabooh Shoobah – INXS
    - 10, 9, 8, 7, 6, 5, 4, 3, 2, 1 – Midnight Oil
- Best Australian Producer
  - Mark Opitz
    - Iva Davies
    - Mark Moffatt
    - Vanda & Young
- Best Debut Album
  - Spirit of Place – Goanna
    - Monkey Grip – Divinyls
    - Pink Suit Blue Day – Eurogliders
    - Hunters & Collectors – Hunters & Collectors
- Best Debut Single
  - "Solid Rock" – Goanna
    - "Without You" – Eurogliders
    - "Talking to a Stranger" – Hunters & Collectors
- Best Australian Single
  - "What about Me?" – Moving Pictures
    - "Great Southern Land" – Icehouse
    - "One Thing" – INXS
    - "This Guy's in Love with You" – The Reels
    - "Six Months in a Leaky Boat" – Split Enz
- Best Song Writer (presented by Tim Finn)
  - Tim Finn
    - Iva Davis (Icehouse)
    - Colin Hay (Men at Work)
- Best New Talent (Johnny O'Keefe Memorial Award)
  - Goanna
- Most Outstanding Achievement
  - Men at Work
- Most Popular Female
  - Chrissy Amphlett (Divinyls)
    - Renée Geyer
    - Sharon O'Neil
    - Wendy Stapleton
- Most Popular Group
  - Split Enz
    - Australian Crawl
    - Icehouse
    - INXS
    - Men at Work
    - Moving Pictures
- Most Popular International Act
  - Duran Duran
    - ABC
    - Madness
    - Simple Minds
- Most Popular Male Performer
  - Iva Davies (Icehouse)

=== 1983 ===
Ceremony details: Held in Melbourne on the 15th of April 1984 at the Palais Theatre, St Kilda. Presenters included: Ross Wilson, Glenn Shorrock, Pat Wilson, Graeme "Shirley" Strachan, Greg Ham, Ian "Molly" Meldrum, Jon Farriss, Michael Hutchence, Marc Hunter, Billy Idol. Live performers: Kids in the Kitchen "Bitter Desire", Models "I Hear Motion", Ross Wilson and Pat Wilson "Strong Love", Pseudo Echo "A Beat for You", Billy Idol "Rebel Yell", Tim Finn "In a Minor Key". The closing live performance was by an ensemble including Shorrock, Lynne Randell, Jim Keays, Darryl Cotton, Debbie Byrne, Strachan, Keith Lamb, John Paul Young, Daryl Braithwaite, and Hunter to commemorate the 25th Anniversary of Johnny O'Keefe's version of "Shout!".

Award winners and nominees:

- Best Australian Album
  - Escapade – Tim Finn
    - Desperate – Divinyls
    - Cargo – Men at Work
    - Creatures of Leisure – Mental as Anything
    - The Pleasure of Your Company – Models
- Best Single
  - "Power and the Passion" – Midnight Oil
    - "Rain" – Dragon
    - "Fraction too Much Friction" – Tim Finn
    - "Original Sin" – INXS
    - "I Hear Motion" – Models
    - "Come Said the Boy" – Mondo Rock
- Best Debut Album
  - Heartland – Real Life
    - The Expression – The Expression
    - Live at the Wireless – JJJ
- Best Debut Single
  - "Bop Girl" – Pat Wilson
    - "Australiana" – Austen Tayshus
    - "Change in Mood" – Kids in the Kitchen
    - "Listening" – Pseudo Echo
    - "Send Me an Angel" – Real Life
- Best Promotional Video
  - Tim Finn's "Fraction too Much Friction" – Richard Lowenstein
    - The Expression's "With Closed Eyes"
    - Mental as Anything's "Spirit Got Lost"
    - Midnight Oil's "Power and the Passion"
    - Pat Wilson's "Bop Girl"
- Best Record Producer of the Year
  - Mark Moffatt and Ricky Fataar for work with Tim Finn, Renée Geyer, Pat Wilson
    - Bruce Brown and Russell Dunlop for work with Machinations, Reels, and Mental as Anything
    - Charles Fisher for work with Moving Pictures, Hoodoo Gurus, The Expression
    - Mark Opitz for work with Australian Crawl, INXS, Divinyls
- Most Outstanding Achievement
  - Men at Work
- Most Promising New Talent (Johnny O'Keefe Award)
  - Real Life
    - Kids in the Kitchen
    - Pseudo Echo
- Songwriter of the Year
  - Tim Finn
    - Colin Hay
    - Eric McCusker
- Special Achievement
  - Michael Jackson for services to entertainment
  - Austen Tayshus for "Australiana"
- Most Popular Female
  - Sharon O'Neill
    - Christina Amphlett
    - Pat Wilson
- Most Popular Group
  - Australian Crawl
    - INXS
    - Men at Work
    - Split Enz
- Most Popular International Act
  - Duran Duran
    - David Bowie
    - Culture Club
    - Michael Jackson
- Most Popular Male Performer
  - Tim Finn (solo)
    - James Reyne

=== 1984 ===
Ceremony details: Held on 19 May 1985 at Sydney Entertainment Centre, and broadcast on 25 May, it was hosted by Greedy Smith, presenters included: Brian Mannix, Meat Loaf, Vicki O'Keefe, Sharon O'Neill, Ian "Molly" Meldrum, Nik Kershaw, Grace Knight and Bernie Lynch (Eurogliders), Julian Lennon, Jenny Morris, Sean Kelly and James Freud (Models), Alan Johnson and Danny Simcic (Real Life), Suzanne Dowling (Rock Arena TV show host). INXS won seven awards and closed with a live performance of "Burn for You", dressed in Akubras (hats) and Drizabones (outdoor coats/oilskin jackets).

Award winners and nominees:

- Best Album
  - The Swing – INXS
    - Body and the Beat – Dragon
    - Red Sails in the Sunset – Midnight Oil
- Best Debut Album
  - Stoneage Romeos – Hoodoo Gurus
    - Autumnal Park – Pseudo Echo
    - Animal Magic – QED
- Best Debut Single
  - "Trust Me" – I'm Talking
    - "Shake This City" – Non Stop Dancers
    - "Big Girls" – Electric Pandas
- Best Female Performance in a Video
  - "Power" – Sharon O'Neill
    - "Big Girls" – Lin Buckfield (Electric Pandas)
    - "Trust Me" – Kate Ceberano (I'm Talking)
    - "Girl on the Wall" – Jane Clifton
    - "In My Life" – Christina Amphlett (Divinyls)
- Best Group Performance in a Video
  - "Burn for You" – INXS
    - "Heaven (Must Be There)" – Eurogliders
    - "Apocalypso" – Mental As Anything
    - "Read About It" – Midnight Oil
    - "Big on Love" – Models
- Best Male Performance in a Video
  - "No Second Prize" – Jimmy Barnes
    - "Short Memory" – Peter Garrett (Midnight Oil)
    - "Phantom Shuffle" – Austen Tayshus
    - "Burn for You" – Michael Hutchence
    - "Gymnasium" – Stephen Cummings
- Best Producer
  - Martin Armiger
    - Charles Fisher
    - Mark Moffatt & Ricky Fataar
    - Mark Opitz
- Best Promotional Video (tie)
  - "Apocalypso" – Mental As Anything
  - "Burn for You" – INXS
    - "Saturday Night" – Cold Chisel
    - "Heaven (Must Be There)" – Eurogliders
- Best Single
  - "Heaven Must Be There" – Eurogliders
    - "No Say in It" – Machinations
    - "Burn for You" – INXS
    - "I Send a Message" – INXS
    - "Soul Kind of Feeling" – Dynamic Hepnotics
    - "Bravo Bravo" – D.D. Smash
- Best Songwriter
  - Andrew Farriss and Michael Hutchence (INXS)
    - Jimmy Barnes
    - Richard Clapton
    - Neil Finn
    - Bernie Lynch (Eurogliders)
    - Sharon O'Neill
    - Don Walker
- Most Outstanding Achievement
  - INXS
- Most Popular Australian Group
  - INXS
    - Midnight Oil
    - Pseudo Echo
    - Split Enz
- Most Popular Female Performer
  - Sharon O'Neill
    - Lin Buckfield
    - Grace Knight
    - Jenny Morris
- Most Popular International Act
  - Duran Duran
    - Culture Club
    - U2
    - Wham!
- Most Popular Male Performer
  - Michael Hutchence (INXS)
    - Brian Canham (Pseudo Echo)
    - Iva Davies (Icehouse)
    - Tim Finn
- Most Promising Talent (Johnny O'Keefe Memorial Award)
  - I'm Talking
    - Electric Pandas

=== 1985 ===
Ceremony details: Held on 14 April 1986 at Melbourne Sports and Entertainment Centre, and broadcast on 20 April, it was hosted by Ian "Molly" Meldrum and presenters included: Grace Knight and Bernie Lynch (Eurogliders), Rick Mayall and Ben Elton (The Young Ones), Sting, Vince Sorrenti, Brad Robinson, Zan Abeyratne, Richard Page, Iva Davies, Brian Canham, Brian Mannix, Tim Finn, Dee C Lee and Suzanne Dowling. Performers were: Pseudo Echo "Living in a Dream", Eurogliders "Absolutely", Do-Ré-Mi "Theme from Jungle Jim", Kids in the Kitchen "Current Stand", Mr. Mister "Kyrie", Models "Let's Build it Up", I'm Talking "Do You Wanna Be?". At the awards ceremony fans of INXS and Uncanny X-Men scuffled and as a result ARIA decided to hold their own awards, which were the entirely peer-voted ARIA Music Awards first held in 1987.

- Best Album
  - Fundamentals – Mental As Anything
    - Working Class Man – Jimmy Barnes
    - What a Life! – Divinyls
    - Absolutely – Eurogliders
    - Mars Needs Guitars – Hoodoo Gurus
    - Listen Like Thieves – INXS
    - Out of Mind, Out of Sight – Models
- Best Debut Album
  - Domestic Harmony – Do-Ré-Mi
    - Gang Gajang – Gang Gajang
    - Shine – Kids in the Kitchen
- Best Debut Single
  - "Man Overboard" – Do-Ré-Mi
    - "Too Young for Promises" – Koo De Tah
- Best Female Performance in a Video
  - "Pleasure and Pain" – Chrissy Amphlett
    - "Love Don't Live Here Anymore" – Kate Ceberano
    - "Man Overboard" – Deborah Conway
- Best Group Performance in a Video
  - "Live it Up" – Mental As Anything
    - "Pleasure and Pain" – Divinyls
    - "What You Need" – INXS
    - "Barbados" – Models
    - "Out of Mind, Out of Sight" – Models
- Best Male Performance in a Video
  - "Working Class Man" – Jimmy Barnes
    - "I'd Die to Be with You Tonight" – Jimmy Barnes
    - "World's Away" – Mark Edwards
    - "My Heart's on Fire" – Fred Lonegan
    - "Live It Up" – Greedy Smith
- Best Producer
  - Mark Opitz for his work with Jimmy Barnes, the Venetians, Models
- Best Video
  - INXS's "What You Need" – Richard Lowenstein and Lyn-Marie Milbourn
- Best Single
  - "Out of Mind, Out of Sight" – Models
  - "Live it Up" – Mental As Anything
    - "Pleasure and Pain" – Divinyls
    - "What You Need" – INXS
- Best Songwriter
  - Greedy Smith (Mental As Anything) – "Live it Up"
- Most Outstanding Achievement
  - Bob Geldof – Oz for Africa
  - INXS
- Most Popular Australian Group
  - INXS
    - Kids in the Kitchen
    - Models
    - Pseudo Echo
    - Uncanny X-Men
- Most Popular Female Performer
  - Kate Ceberano
    - Chrissy Amphlett
    - Lin Buckfield
    - Tina Cross
    - Grace Knight
- Most Popular International Act
  - Duran Duran
    - A-ha
    - Dire Straits
    - Madonna
    - Wham!
- Most Popular Male Performer
  - Michael Hutchence
    - Jimmy Barnes
    - Brian Canham
    - Scott Carne
    - Brian Mannix
- Most Promising New Talent (Johnny O'Keefe Memorial Award)
  - Do-Ré-Mi
    - Rockmelons
    - Koo De Tah

=== 1986 ===
Ceremony details: Held on 19 July 1987 at the Sydney Entertainment Centre; it followed the last regular Countdown show. It was hosted by Ian "Molly" Meldrum who revealed his bald head in imitation of Peter Garrett of Midnight Oil. Performers included: Icehouse "Crazy", Angry Anderson "Suddenly", Mental As Anything "He's Just No Good", Boom Crash Opera "City Flat", John Farnham "You're the Voice" and English pop group, Swing Out Sister "Breakout".

By the time of the last Countdown award ceremony, the Australian Recording Industry Association (ARIA) had already instituted its own entirely peer-voted ARIA Music Awards, with its first ceremony held on 2 March 1987 at the Sheraton Wentworth Hotel in Sydney. Elton John was the host but the ARIAs were not televised with presenters including Basia Bonkowski, Slim Dusty and Donnie Sutherland.

- Best Album
  - Whispering Jack – John Farnham
    - Crowded House – Crowded House
    - Gossip – Paul Kelly & The Coloured Girls
    - Human Frailty – Hunters & Collectors
- Best Debut Album
  - Crowded House – Crowded House
    - Bear Witness – I'm Talking
    - Wa Wa Nee – Wa Wa Nee
- Best Debut Single
  - "Great Wall" – Boom Crash Opera
    - "Mean to Me" – Crowded House
    - "Hungry Town" – Big Pig
    - "Stimulation" – Wa Wa Nee
- Best Debut Act
  - Crowded House
    - Wa Wa Nee
    - Boom Crash Opera
    - Big Pig
- Best Female Performance in a Video
  - "You're Gonna Get Hurt" – Jenny Morris
    - "Do You Wanna Be" – Kate Ceberano
    - "Guns & Butter" – Deborah Conway
- Best Group Performance in a Video
  - "Kiss the Dirt" by INXS
    - "Mean to Me" – Crowded House
    - "Let's Go to Paradise" – Mental As Anything
    - "Funkytown" – Pseudo Echo
    - "Don't Dream It's Over" – Crowded House
    - "Good Times" – INXS & Jimmy Barnes
- Best Male Performance in a Video
  - "You're the Voice" – John Farnham
    - "Ride the Night Away" – Jimmy Barnes
    - "Before Too Long" Paul Kelly
    - "Bad Moon Rising" – Dave Mason
- Best Producer
  - Mark Opitz
    - Charles Fisher
    - Ross Fraser
- Best Video
  - "Don't Dream It's Over" – Crowded House
    - "You're the Voice" – John Farnham
    - "Kiss the Dirt" – INXS
    - "Listen Like Thieves" – INXS
- Best Single
  - "You're the Voice" – John Farnham
    - "Before Too Long" – Paul Kelly & The Coloured Girls
    - "The Dead Heart" – Midnight Oil
    - "Don't Dream It's Over" – Crowded House
- Best Songwriter
  - Neil Finn
    - Paul Kelly
- Most Outstanding Achievement
  - Whispering Jack – John Farnham
- Most Popular Australian Group
  - Pseudo Echo
    - INXS
    - Uncanny X-Men
    - Wa Wa Nee
- Most Popular Female Performer
  - Kate Ceberano
    - Grace Knight
    - Jenny Morris
- Most Popular International Act
  - a-ha
    - Duran Duran
    - Madonna
- Most Popular Male Performer
  - Brian Canham
    - Michael Hutchence
- Johnny O'Keefe Award For Most Promising New Talent
  - Big Pig
    - Ups & Downs
    - Cattletruck
    - Kings of the Sun
    - Mannequins
