= Johnny Young =

Australian musical artist (1947–2026)

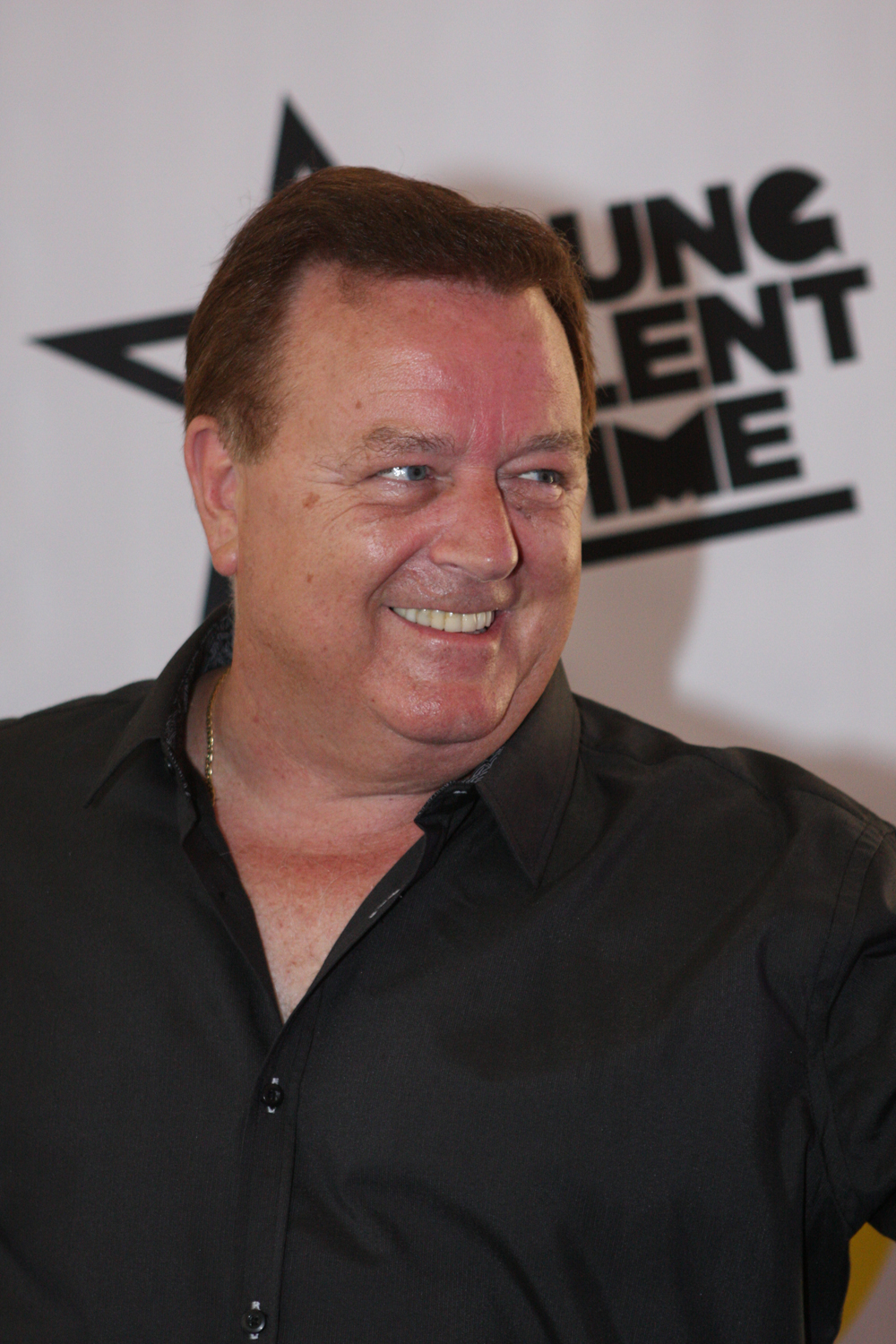
- Young at a Young Talent Time media event in 2012

Background information
- Also known as: John B. Young
- Born: Johnny Benjamin de Jong; 12 March 1947; Rotterdam, Netherlands
- Origin: Perth, Western Australia, Australia
- Died: 13 August 2026 (aged 79) Perth, Western Australia, Australia
- Genre: Pop
- Occupations: Singer; songwriter; musician; record producer; disc jockey; television presenter; television producer; radio presenter; businessman
- Instruments: Vocals; piano; guitar
- Years active: c.1961–2026
- Labels: 7-Teen; Clarion; Festival; L&Y; Calendar
- Formerly of: The Nomads; the Strangers; Johnny Young & Kompany; Danny's Word

Johnny Young (born Johnny Benjamin de Jong; 12 March 1947 – 13 August 2026) was an Australian singer, songwriter, musician, record producer, disc jockey, television and radio presenter, television producer and businessman. He nurtured Australian talent and was most known as being the creator and producer for his self-hosted TV series Young Talent Time, a series he conceived with his business partner Kevin Lewis, after drawing inspiration from the US children's variety program The Mickey Mouse Club and also for his string of talent schools, called the Johnny Young Talent Schools, which taught music and dance.

Young himself was an early Australian pop singer. He had a number-one hit in 1966 with a double-A-sided single of "Step Back" (written by Stevie Wright and George Young of the Easybeats) along with a cover of the Strangeloves' "Cara-lyn". He also had a hit record in 1967 with "Lady", written by the Bee Gees' frontman Barry Gibb who wrote several further hit songs for Young.

He was concurrently the host of the television pop music variety program The Go!! Show, having replaced host Ian Turpie. In the mid-1960s he toured with the Rolling Stones and supported Roy Orbison and the Easybeats.

As a composer, he penned the number-one hits "The Real Thing" and "The Girl That I Love" for Russell Morris, "The Star" for Ross D. Wyllie and "I Thank You" for Lionel Rose. He also wrote the anti–Vietnam War song "Smiley" for Ronnie Burns which was based on pop idol Normie Rowe.

His Young Talent Time television show screened on Network Ten from 1971 to 1988. It launched the careers of several teen pop stars and theatre actors including Danni Minogue, Tina Arena, Jamie Redfern, Jane Scali, Debra Byrne, Sally Boyden, Karen Knowles, Wade Robson and Jamie Churchill.

Typically each episode would feature the cast, known as "The Talent Team", singing and performing hits of the era and would end each episode with a hailing ballad-style sing-along rendition of the Beatles song "All My Loving" followed by his trade mark sign-off "Goodnight Australia".

The series also included a panelist of judges including Evie Hayes, Frank Tupper, Ronnie Burns, Honor Blackman, and Nancye Hayes.

At the Logie Awards of 1990, sponsored by TV Week, Young was inducted into the Logies Hall of Fame. He was inducted into the Australian Recording Industry Association's Hall of Fame in 2010 by Arena, who performed Young's song "The Star". He is the first person inducted into both halls of fame.

== Early life and career ==
=== Background ===
Johnny Young was born Johnny Benjamin de Jong on 12 March 1947 in Rotterdam, the Netherlands. He was conceived as a result of an affair between his mother, Anna Wilhelmina (20 July 1913 – 29 December 1989), and a musician, Johannes. He was raised as the youngest son of Anna and her husband Fokke Jan de Jong (22 March 1914 – 15 July 1989), who was in the Royal Netherlands East Indies Army and served in Indonesia after World War II. His half-siblings are Cornellia (born 13 February 1936), Antonia (born 22 August 1937) and Ferdinand (born 13 November 1944). Their father was still in Indonesia from December 1946 until September 1948 when Young was one-and-a-half years old. The family migrated to Perth, Western Australia. Fokke arrived in July 1953 and they settled in the Perth Hills suburb of Kalamunda in the 1950s. Fokke worked as a welder on industrial projects including the Kwinana Oil Refinery. His mother was in a choir and inspired his early interest in music. On 25 August 1959, Johnny, Ferdinand and Fokke were naturalised as Australian citizens.

Young's mother took him to Saturday morning radio shows for children and he would sing along. He performed solo songs wearing a specially made jacket. After leaving school, he worked as a trainee disc jockey and started singing at local dances.

=== Pop singer ===
At the age of 14, Young was lead vocalist for 18 months of a group called the Nomads (later known as the Strangers—not the Melbourne group called the Strangers), which consisted of Young, John Eddy (guitar), Warwick Findlay (drums), Don Prior (bass guitar) and Tony Summers (guitar).

At 18 years old, Young was host of TVW-7 Perth television pop music show Club Seventeen in early 1965. As Johnny Young & the Strangers he released two singles, "Club Seventeen"/"Oh Johnny, No" and "No Other Love"/"Heigh Ho", both on the 7-Teen label. Young then signed with Clarion Records, a Perth-based label run by Martin Clarke. In an interview Clarke said "We just got together and he said he wanted to make a national hit and branch out, he was very ambitious." Clarke, armed with his recordings of Young, went to Sydney and secured a deal with Festival Records to have the Clarion label manufactured and distributed throughout Australia.

The following year, 1966, he formed Johnny Young & Kompany as lead vocalist. He was backed by Eddy (guitar), Findlay (drums), Summers (guitar) and Jim Griffiths (bass). After performing as the supporting act to the Easybeats in early 1966, Young recorded the song "Step Back", co-written by Stevie Wright and George Young (no relation), members of the Easybeats. The single was released in May 1966 as a double A-side with his cover version of "Cara-Lyn", originally by the Strangeloves. The release peaked at number one on the Go-Set National Top 40 in November. It was one of the biggest-selling Australian singles of the 1960s, behind Normie Rowe's "Que Sera Sera"/"Shakin' All Over". In October, his EP Let It Be Me went to number four on Go-Set National Top 40.

Johnny Young & Kompany moved to Melbourne in mid-1966. Mick Wade (ex-the Vibrants) joined on guitar and organ. Young was interviewed by Go-Set writer, Ian "Molly" Meldrum for their 13 July issue. Later that year Young compered the short-lived television pop show Too Much and in 1967 he hosted The Go!! Show, following the resignation of Ian Turpie. In January the band released covers of the Everly Brothers' hits "When Will I Be Loved?" /"Kiss Me Now" as another double-A-sided single which peaked at number three. He disbanded the group to go solo and supported Roy Orbison, the Walker Brothers, the Mixtures and the Yardbirds at Festival Hall, Melbourne, on Australia Day (26 January). While touring in Brisbane he met Barry Gibb of the Bee Gees and provided Gibb with airfare to Sydney for a television spot. Another hit for Young was his slower version of the Beatles' song "All My Loving" which reached number four nationally in May; it later became his signature song.

He won a Logie for "Best Teenage Personality" in 1967 for his work on The Go!! Show. On 9 August Go-Set published its annual pop poll and Young was voted third "Most Popular Male" behind Ronnie Burns and Rowe. However, the show was axed by mid-year and he relocated to London where he shared a flat with Gibb. In July, he released "Lady", written by Gibb especially for him, which reached the Top 40. "Craise Finton Kirk", written by Barry and Robin Gibb, was released in August and peaked at number 14. It was followed by "Every Christian Lion Hearted Man Will Show You", written by Barry, Robin and Maurice Gibb, but did not chart. Young briefly returned to Perth in September and teamed up with drummer Danny Finley (ex-MPD Ltd); they both flew to London to form Danny's Word with Rob Alexander on guitar and Pete Friedberg on bass guitar. After four weeks' rehearsal in London the band played a residency at the Star Club in Hamburg as a precursor to touring Australia. Due to other commitments the band split on return from Germany when Pete Friedberg left to work with other bands including Ainsley Dunbar's Blue Whale and Dusty Springfield. Young returned to Australia in January 1968 with Rod Alexander and recorded "Unconscientious Objector" and his last Top 40 single, "It's a Sunny Day". Subsequent singles did not reach the Top 40. Young became a news and gossip writer for Go-Set from December 1968 to August 1969.

=== Songwriter ===
While sharing a flat with Barry Gibb in London in late 1967, Young was encouraged to write songs. Gibb taught him that "there are no rules in song-writing, there is a structure, but what you need to do is find the 'hook', and it could be in the melody, the chorus, the words or even an identifiable riff, and that can be the difference in writing a hit record." During 1968, back in Australia, Young wrote "The Real Thing" as a reaction against a Coca-Cola jingle, "Coke is the real thing". Young envisaged the song as a low-key acoustic ballad (in the style of the Beatles' "Strawberry Fields Forever") and he originally intended it for his friend and fellow singer Ronnie Burns. Young was practising the song in a dressing room during taping of TV pop music show Uptight when pop producer and fellow Go-Set writer Ian Meldrum heard it. Meldrum (who was also manager for solo singer Russell Morris (ex-Somebody's Image)) was greatly impressed by the song and immediately insisted that Young cut a demo of it for Morris. Under Meldrum's production and with the collaboration of engineer John L. Sayers the song was radically transformed into a seven-minute psychedelic epic, with an elaborately edited backing track performed by an all-star band including ex-Zoot guitarist Roger Hicks (who composed the acoustic guitar intro), members of Melbourne band The Groop and backing vocalist Maureen Elkner. Reportedly the most expensive single ever recorded in Australia up to that time, it became one of the biggest Australian pop hits of 1969, peaking at number one in May and was number one on Go-Set Top Records for the Year of 1969, and made Morris an immediate national star. It was later covered by Kylie Minogue and by Midnight Oil. Young's next song for Morris, "The Girl That I Love", was released as a double-A-side with "Part Three into Paper Walls" (another epic extended production co-written by Morris and Young) which reached number one in October.

Television pop music show, Uptight, was hosted by Ross D. Wyllie who recorded the Young-penned, "The Star" – it was later covered by Herman's Hermits as "Here Comes the Star" – which replaced "The Girl That I Love" at number one in November. It had been written to describe the loneliness associated with fame in show business. Young also wrote and produced hits for Burns including "Smiley", which peaked at number two in February 1970. It described their mutual friend, Rowe, who had been conscripted to serve in the Vietnam War. Rowe recorded his own version on Missing in Action (2007). Young wrote "I Thank You" for former boxing champion Lionel Rose which reached number one in March. It was used by comedy duo, Roy and HG, for their calls of football grand finals in the 1990s. On 11 July 1970, Go-Set pop poll voted Young as most popular 'Composer' of the year and in 1971 he finished second behind Morris.

=== Young Talent Time ===
In 1970, Young formed a production company with Kevin Lewis (former Festival Records executive), Lewis-Young Productions, which developed the pop music television show Happening '70 – first hosted by Wyllie and later by Jeff Phillips – for the ATV-0 channel. It was subsequently followed by Happening '71 and Happening '72. Lewis-Young Productions also developed Young Talent Time from April 1971, a children's variety show and talent quest with Young as host. Regular cast members were known as the "Young Talent Team". The show was a launching pad for several Australian performers including Jamie Redfern, Debra Byrne, Dannii Minogue and Tina Arena. The directors were Garry Dunstan and Terry Higgins. Each episode typically ended with Young and the team singing "All My Loving" as a lullaby. Young established the Johnny Young Talent School for performance arts in 1979; some of its students became contestants and regulars on Young Talent Time. 2004 Australian Idol runner-up Anthony Callea trained with the school, as did the 2008 winner, Wes Carr.

As well as producing the television series, Lewis-Young Productions distributed related merchandise including records on their own label (L&Y), books and magazines, a board game and a set of chewing gum cards. In 1972, Caravan Holiday, a short film, featured the original six Young Talent Team members plus two recently recruited new members, Greg Mills (later to be musical director in last years of YTT) and Julie Ryles (who died in early 2011) with cameos by pop star Johnny Farnham and long-term judge Evie Hayes. Young was cast in multiple cameo roles as a service station attendant, farmer, speed boat attendant and camping park manager.

In 1989, the Ten Network (formerly ATV-0), axed Young Talent Time quoting poor ratings against the popular variety series Hey Hey It's Saturday. Young had committed to building his own television studios to film Young Talent Time and was forced to sell his family home to finance the debts. During the year his legal father died and, with his mother, he tracked down his biological father. Soon after his mother also died and his marriage was also in trouble. On 9 March 1990, Young was inducted into the TV Week Logie Awards' Hall of Fame for "an outstanding and sustained contribution to Australian television".

From 24 October 2006, the weekly magazine New Idea featured articles on Byrne's autobiography, Not Quite Ripe, which alleged that from the age of 12 she was introduced to sex, drugs and alcohol on Young Talent Time. The claims were vigorously denied by Young, he stated that Byrne was already 14 when she started and that drugs were not available on set, saying that "Any drug-taking Debra did, she certainly didn't do it on our show." He said no-one on the show was aware of her affair with "Michael", a boom operator ten years her senior. According to Byrne the pair had run off together for a weekend when she was 15. A producer for the show had "Michael" replaced as boom operator. Byrne also claimed that her parents knew of her relationship with "Michael".

In 2009, Young indicated that he was in talks with Network Ten to create an updated version of Young Talent Time. The new series aired on Network Ten from 22 January to 4 May 2012 and was hosted by Rob Mills, with Young serving as executive producer and judge.

=== Philippines controversy ===
In the early 1990s, Young learned that Terry Higgins, a former Young Talent Time studio director, had contracted HIV. By 1993, Young had financially supported Higgins, who had sought alternative ozone therapy in the Philippines, but the clinic turned out to have a forged license. When it was raided, the Filipino authorities mistook Young for the owner and arrested him under charges of running an illegal AIDS clinic after accompanying Higgins. Young was tested for HIV and threatened with deportation back to Australia. Subsequently, all charges were dropped, but Young's public image was damaged by media coverage of rumours regarding his sexuality. ABC Television produced an episode on Australian Story in February 2000 in which he discussed the events and their effect on his life and career. A year after seeking the ozone therapy, Higgins died of AIDS with Young still supporting him.

=== Later career ===
After Young Talent Time, Young continued in entertainment, he worked as a radio disc jockey and occasionally performed live. In 1999 he produced Cavalcade of Stars for Foxtel including repackaging segments of Young Talent Time and showcasing new Australian bands.

In December 2000, Young relocated to Perth to become the breakfast host on Perth AM station 6IX. During 2001 to 2004, he periodically performed with Rowe, Buddy England (ex-the Seekers, the Mixtures) and Marcie Jones (Marcie and The Cookies) as the "Legends of Sixties Rock" at venues across Australia – all four had appeared on The Go-Show. While living in Perth, Young established a new outlet for his Johnny Young Talent School franchise. In 2001, the 30th anniversary of Young Talent Time was celebrated by Network Ten with a special documentary, Young Talent Time Tells All, which was followed on 4 November by a reunion party for former cast members. Young attended with his daughter Anna – who had appeared on the show. Back in Perth, Young hosted The Pet Show on ABC Television in 2006.

On 27 October 2010, Young was inducted into the Australian Recording Industry Association (ARIA) Hall of Fame. On news of his impending induction, Young said that "I have always felt like the luckiest kid on the block to be able to continue working in the music industry for 50 years in so many areas when basically I am just a rock and roller. To receive this honour is the cherry on an amazing cake. I am very grateful to all those who supported and encouraged me." Young was inducted by Tina Arena, a former Young Talent Time member, who performed his song "Here Comes the Star" as a musical tribute. Twenty-first century pop group Short Stack performed Young's version of "Cara-Lyn". In late September 2021, Young Talent Time: Unmasked, a special celebrating the 50th anniversary of Young Talent Time, was broadcast, with Young, Dannii Minogue and Arena reminiscing via teleconferencing.

== Personal life and death ==
Young was raised as the son of Fokke Jan de Jong and his wife Anna. They already had three children; Cornelia, Antonia and Ferdinand. While Fokke was stationed in Indonesia, Anna had an affair and became pregnant by Young's biological father Johannes, a singer. When Young was in his 40s, he met Johannes and found that he had three half-siblings.

Young's first marriage was to Jane, with whom he had his son Craig, with the marriage ending in divorce; Jane later died of leukaemia. In the early 1970s, he married his second wife, Kathy. They had two daughters: Anna and Fleur.

Both his mother and legal father died in 1989. His marriage to Kathy ended by 1998. Young married Rose McKimmie on 24 December 1999 in Bali and they lived in a battery-powered rural cottage about an hour-and-a-quarter from Melbourne. In February 2014 he said the marriage to Rose had been a mistake and lasted only eighteen months. In 2009 he married Marisha, a Polish-born economist, and they remained close until his death.

Young had three children, Craig (died c. 2014 of pancreatic cancer), Anna and Fleur, as well as seven grandchildren and two great-grandchildren. Fleur works in fashion, and Anna is a singing and dancing teacher at The Johnny Young Talent School and a director of high school musical productions, following studies at the Melbourne Conservatorium of Music and performing in musical theatre.

After a brief illness, Young died from pancreatic cancer in Perth on 13 August 2026 at the age of 79.

== Discography ==
=== Albums ===
- Young Johnny (Johnny Young & Kompany) – Festival (1966)
- Johnny Young's Golden LP (Johnny Young & Kompany) – Clarion (MCL 32124) (1966)
- It's a Wonderful World – Clarion (MCL 32234) (1967)
- Surprises – Clarion (MCL 32752) (1968)
- The Young Man and His Music – Festival (L 34343) (1971)
- A Musical Portrait – L&Y (L 25071) (1973)
- The Best of Johnny Young – Calendar (L-15086) (1974)
- All My Loving – Pisces Records/Astor Records (L-107) (1978)

=== EPs ===
- Let It Be Me (Johnny Young & Kompany) – Clarion (MCX 11205) (1966)
- Kiss Me Now (Johnny Young & Kompany) – Clarion (MCX 11246) (1966)
- All My Loving – Clarion (MCX 11251) (April 1967)
- Craise Finton Kirk – Clarion (MCX 11379) (1968)

=== Singles ===
Year	Title	Peak chart positions		Album
Year	Title	Go-Set	KMR	Album
1965	"Club Seventeen" / "Go Johnny Go" (Johnny Young & the Strangers)^{[I]}	—	—	Non-album single
1965	"Heigh Ho" / "No Other Love" (Johnny Young & the Strangers)^{[II]}	—	—	Non-album single
1966	"Step Back" / "Cara-Lyn" (Johnny Young & Kompany)^{[III]}	1	2	Young Johnny
1966	"Let It Be Me" (Johnny Young & Kompany)	4	4	Let It Be Me EP
1966	"When Will I Be Loved? / "Kiss Me Now" (Johnny Young & Kompany)	3	4	Kiss Me Now EP
1967	"All My Loving"	4	9	All My Loving EP
1967	"Lady" / "Good Evening Girl"	33	37	It's a Wonderful World
1967	"Craise Finton Kirk"	14	25	Craise Finton Kirk EP
1967	"Every Christian Lion Hearted Man Will Show You"	—	—	Surprises
1967	"Wonderful World"	—	—	Surprises
1967	"Unconscientious Objector"	—	—	Surprises
1968	"Remember Me If You Please"	—	—	Non-album single
1968	"It's a Sunny Day"	31	29	Non-album single
1968	"Mrs. Willoughby"	—	—	Non-album single
1969	"A Love Song"	—	—	Non-album single
1972	"Reach for the Sun"	—	80	The Young Man and His Music
1973	"Just Another Rock and Roller"	—	66	A Musical Portrait
"—" denotes a recording that did not chart or was not released in that territory.

== Awards and nominations ==
=== ARIA Music Awards ===
The ARIA Music Awards is an annual awards ceremony that recognises excellence, innovation, and achievement across all genres of Australian music. They commenced in 1987. Young was inducted into the Hall of Fame in 2010.

Year	Nominee / work	Award	Result
2010	himself	ARIA Hall of Fame	inductee

=== Australian Songwriters Hall of Fame ===
The Australian Songwriters Hall of Fame was established in 2004 to honour the lifetime achievements of some of Australia's greatest songwriters.

Year	Nominee / work	Award	Result
2015	himself	Australian Songwriters Hall of Fame	inducted

=== Go-Set Pop Poll ===
The Go-Set Pop Poll was coordinated by teen-oriented pop music newspaper, Go-Set and was established in February 1966 and conducted an annual poll during 1966 to 1972 of its readers to determine the most popular personalities.

Year	Nominee / work	Award	Result
1967	himself	Top Male Singer	3rd
1970	himself	Best Composer	1st
1971	himself	Best Composer / Songwriter	2nd
1972	himself	Best Songwriter	5th

=== West Australian Music Industry Awards ===
The West Australian Music Industry Awards are annual awards celebrating achievements for Western Australian music. They commenced in 1985.

Year	Nominee / work	Award	Result
2019	Johnny Young	Hall of Fame	inductee

== Notes ==
1. For name as Johnny B De Jong see National Archives of Australia, Australian Netherlands Migration Agreement, item No. A2478, DE JONG FJ/BOX 176. For Johnny B De Jong is same as Johnny Young and for middle name as Benjamin see Australian Story interview transcript. For birth date as 12 March 1947 see A2478. For name as Johnny Benjamin De Jong born on 12 March 1947 in Rotterdam, Netherlands see item No. PP168/1, W1957/10576, page 8. However, Australian Story has birth date as 11 March 1947. Other sources give birth year as 1945. For birthplace as Netherlands see A2478. For Rotterdam see Australian Story. Other sources give Indonesia as birth country.

I."Club Seventeen" / "Go Johnny Go" was released by Johnny Young & the Strangers on 7 Teen label (CST 001) as a double-A-sided single in January 1965 in Perth.
II."Heigh Ho" / "No Other Love" was released by Johnny Young & the Strangers on 7 Teen label (CST 002) as a double-A-sided single in March 1965 in Perth.
III."Step Back" / "Cara-Lyn" was released by Johnny Young & Kompany on Clarion label by Festival Records (MCK 1359) as a double-A-sided single in May 1966 in Perth.
