= Yvonne Barrett =

- Born: Yvonne Frances Barrett; 1946; Braybrook, Victoria, Australia
- Origin: Victoria, Australia
- Died: 1985 (aged 38–39) Birchgrove, New South Wales, Australia
- Genres: Pop
- Occupation: Singer
- Instrument: Voice
- Years active: 1957–1985
- Labels: Go!!; Columbia/EMI; Alberts

Yvonne Frances Barrett (1946 – 2 September 1985) was an Australian pop singer. She reached the top 60 Kent Music Report singles chart with her cover versions of "You're the One"/"Little People", in October 1965. She released other singles in that, and the following, decade. Barrett also appeared on TV shows in the 1960s and 1970s. She became a session singer and performed on the club circuit. Barrett married Hoang Van Truong, a Vietnam War veteran, in December 1983; the couple separated in the following year. Truong was found guilty of Barrett's 1985 murder and was sentenced to life imprisonment without parole, in August 1986.

== Biography ==
Yvonne Barrett was the daughter of Ted and Sheila Barrett, and was raised with two siblings. The family lived in Braybrook, Victoria. Barrett started ballet lessons at the age of two and a half.

In January 1957 she performed in the pantomime, Jack and Jill, at the Princess Theatre, Melbourne. In 1963 she joined the cast of Swallow's Juniors, a children's TV talent contest and entertainment show on HSV7. She took singing lessons in her mid-teens, which led to musical theatre including, The Sound of Music, in the role of Louisa von Trapp, at the Princess Theatre in October 1961. She subsequently appeared in Carnival!, Wild Cat and Stop the World – I Want to Get Off. Barrett described working in musicals to The Australian Women's Weekly's correspondent in July 1964, "I love everything about the theatre. We work odd hours, but it doesn't worry me. I've never known a nine to five job – and it's wonderful to be able to sleep in in the mornings." Barrett became a regular on pop music TV program, The Go!! Show, by 1965, where she performed her renditions, "Off & Running", "I Walk Alone" and the Toys' "A Lovers Concerto". She was signed to the related Go!! Records label, which issued her first three singles. She achieved her highest chart success with her cover version of Petula Clark's "You're the One" backed by her rendition of Chloee Harris' "Little People", in October 1965. In December Barrett, along with fellow TV personalities, Ian Turpie, Tommy Hanlon Jr and Pat Carroll, entertained Australian troops during the Vietnam War. They were "the first Government-sponsored entertainment team" to visit the Australian troops in Vietnam. Her next single, "Send Her Away", appeared in July 1966 and was followed by "Don't Bother Callin'" in October; Australian musicologist, Ian McFarlane, described the singles as, "minor hits in Melbourne."

Barrett and Carroll returned to Vietnam for another tour in August 1968. Barrett was presented with a Việt Cộng flag during one of her two tours. Australian pop music newspaper, Go-Set (not related to Go!! Show or Go!! Records), published an annual poll of their readers, which included female-based categories, where she was listed at No. 7 Girl Vocal (1966), No. 6 Top Girl Singer (1967), No. 7 Female Vocal (1969), No. 5 Girl (1970), No. 6 Best Girl Vocal (1971) and No. 6 Female Vocalist (1972). In 1970 she released a single, "Lu" (originally by Laura Nyro), which featured her big voice with a brassy jazz-rock, Blood Sweat & Tears arrangement.

Although not achieving further chart success she retained popularity due to live appearances, and being on national TV shows, Uptight and Happening 70-72. She performed "Always Something There to Remind Me" and Rare Earth's, "Get Ready". During the 1970s she moved into session work and club appearances, and was a regular on Mary Hardy's The Penthouse Club on HSV7. Soon after she moved to Perth. In the 1980s Yvonne Barrett moved from Perth to Sydney and was working as a waitress.

Barrett married former Vietnam War veteran, Hoang Van Truong, in December 1983; they had met in a Perth nightclub. The couple separated in the following year.

=== Death ===
Barrett's body was found on 3 September 1985, at her unit in Birchgrove, New South Wales. Her estranged husband, Truong, was found guilty of her murder; he had spent the night with her, and strangled her in the morning when she asked him to leave.

Barrett's funeral was held at Christ the King Catholic Church, Braybrook, Victoria. It was attended by Australian show business celebrities including, Bert and Patti Newton. Patti posted a condolence notice in The Age, "What wonderful times to remember of growing up together." Barrett was buried at Altona Memorial Park, Victoria.

== Discography ==
=== Singles ===
- "Little People" / "You're the One" (October 1965) – Go!! Records KMR No. 58, Melbourne: No. 28, Sydney: No. 3
- "Send Her Away" / "Won't Someone Say" (July 1966) – Go!! Records
- "Don't Bother Callin'" / "I'm Taking Him Back" (October 1966) – Go!! Records
- "Lu" / "Picture Me Gone" (March 1970) – Columbia / EMI)
- "No Longer Part of Your Life" / "Mr 7654312" (1972) – Albert Productions

TELEVISION

Year	Title	Performance	Type
1963	Swallow's Juniors	Herself	TV series
1965-1967	The Go!! Show	Herself - Singer / Performer sings "Off And Running" / "Tar And Cement (II Ragazzo Della Via Gluck) / "Send Her Away" / "It's Love Baby (24 Hours A Day)" / "May My Heart Be Cast Into Stone" / "A Lover's Concerto"	TV series, 40 episodes
1966	Bandstand	Herself - Singer sings "Send Her Away" / "Won't Someone Say"	TV series, 1 episode
1968	Uptight	Herself - Singer sings ("There's) Always Something There To Remind Me"	TV series, 1 episode
1969	The Johnny Farnham Special	Herself	TV special
1969	The Mike Walsh Show	Herself - Singer	TV series, 1 episode
1969	The Tommy Leonetti Show	Herself - Guest	TV series, 1 episode
1969	Sounds Like Us	Herself sings "For One In My Lifetime" / "Don't Give Up" / "Cute"	TV series, 2 episodes
1969	Sounds Like Us	Herself sings "Reach Out For Me" / "One"	TV series, 1 episode
1969–1970	In Melbourne Tonight	Herself - Singer sings "Big Spender"	TV series, 16 episodes
1970–1975	Penthouse Club	Herself - Singer	TV series, 21 episodes
1972	Hit Scene	Herself - Guest Singer sings "No Longer Part Of Your Life"	ABC TV series, 2 episodes
1972	Musical Cashbox	Herself - Guest	TV series, 1 episode
1972	Hit Scene	Herself - Singer sings "Mr. 7654312"	ABC TV series, 1 episode
1972–1975	The Graham Kennedy Show	Herself - Singer sings "Al Jolson Tribute Medley	TV series, 9 episodes
1973	The Graham Kennedy Show	Herself - Singer sings "Everybody Gets To Go To The Moon"	TV series, 1 episode
1972	The Graham Kennedy Show	Herself - Singer sings "You're Gonna Hear From Me"	TV series, 1 episode
1973	The Graham Kennedy Show	Herself - Singer sings "The Last Blues Song"	TV series, 1 episode
1973	The Graham Kennedy Show	Herself - Singer sings "Hit The Road Jack" / "Sing"	TV series, 1 episode
1973	The Graham Kennedy Show	Herself - Singer sings "Peaceful"	TV series, 1 episode
1973	The Graham Kennedy Show	Herself - Singer sings "Everybody Gets To Go To The Moon"	TV series, 1 episode
1974–1975	The Ernie Sigley Show	Herself - Singer sings "The Last Blues Song"	TV series, 5 episodes
1974	The Ernie Sigley Show	Herself - Singer sings "The Shoop Shoop Song (It's in His Kiss)"	TV series, 1 episode
1974	The Ernie Sigley Show	Herself - Singer sings "Never, Never, Never"	TV series, 1 episode
1975	The Ernie Sigley Show	Herself - Singer sings "The Last Blues Song"	TV series, 1 episode
1975	The Graham Kennedy Show	Herself - Singer sings "Never Can Say Goodbye"	TV series, 1 episode
1975	The Ernie Sigley Show	Herself - Singer sings "Everybody Gets To Go To The Moon"	TV series, 1 episode
1982	Australian Stars of the 60's	Herself - Archive clip	TV special
1985	Ten Eyewitness News	Herself - Death report	TV series, 1 episode
1985	Seven Nightly News	Herself - Death report	TV series, 1 episode
1985	National Nine News	Herself - Death report	TV series, 1 episode
1985	ABC Nightly News	Herself - Death report	TV series, 1 episode
2003	Love Is In The Air	Herself - Archive clip	ABC TV series, 1 episode 2: "She's Leaving Home"

== Awards and nominations ==
=== Go-Set Pop Poll ===
The Go-Set Pop Poll was coordinated by teen-oriented pop music newspaper, Go-Set and was established in February 1966 and conducted an annual poll during 1966 to 1972 of its readers to determine the most popular personalities.

Year	Nominee / work	Award	Result
1970	herself	Girl Vocal	5th
