= Altona Memorial Park =

Cemetery in Melbourne, Australia

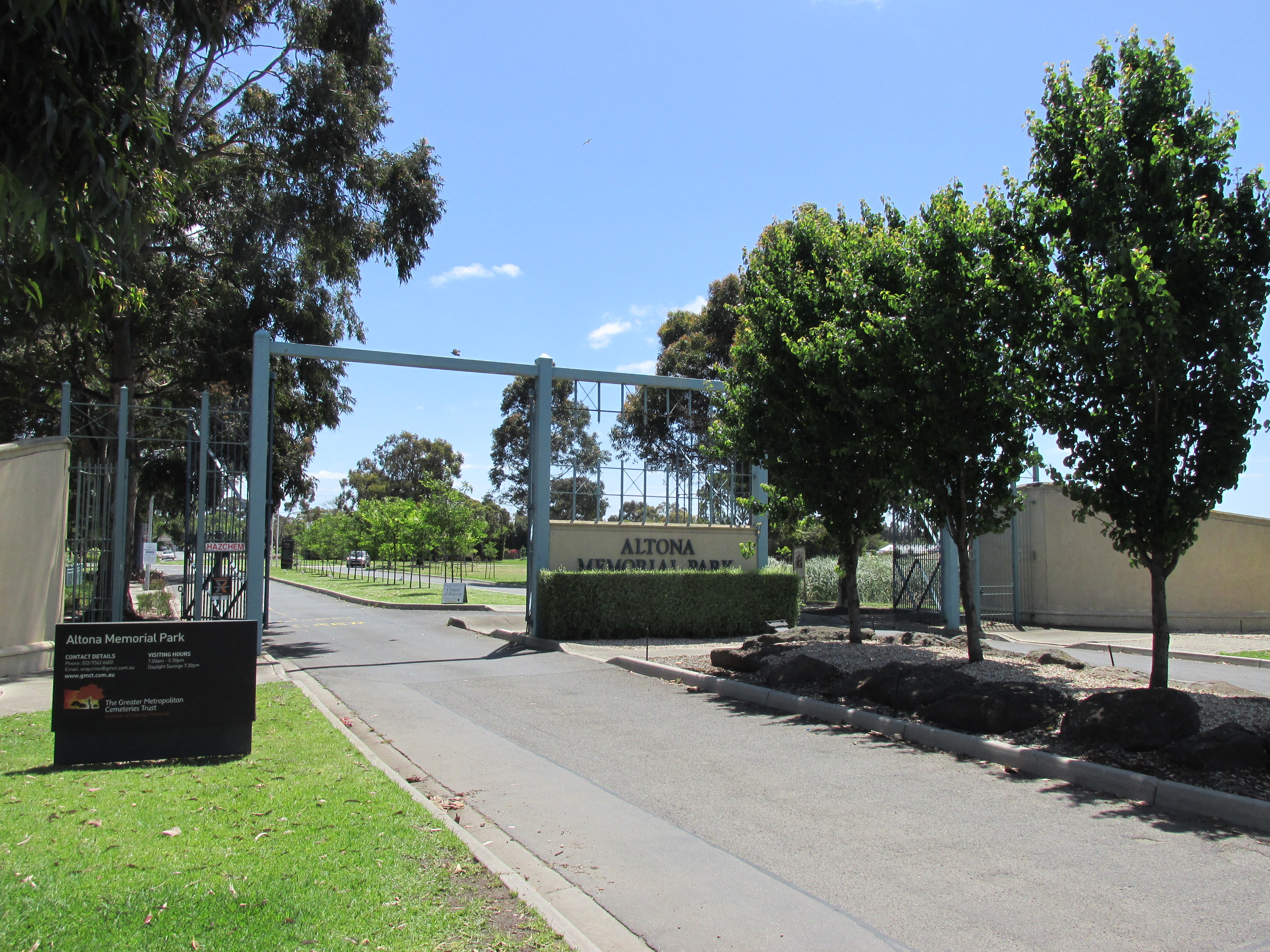
- Interactive map of Altona Memorial Park

Details
- Established: 1961
- Country: Australia
- Coordinates: 37°49′45″S 144°49′20″E
- Owned by: The Greater Metropolitan Cemeteries Trust
- No. of interments: >60,000
- Website: Altona Memorial Park
- Find a Grave: Altona Memorial Park

Altona Memorial Park is a cemetery and crematorium serving the western suburbs of Melbourne. The park opened in January 1961, and is currently operated by Greater Metropolitan Cemeteries Trust (GMCT). They manage eighteen other sites across Victoria, including Preston Cemetery, Fawkner Memorial Park, Coburg Pine Ridge Cemetery and Burwood Cemetery.

Opening as a modern cemetery in 1961, Altona Memorial Park features floral landscaped lawns and extensive memorial gardens, differing from the traditional monumental cemetery and creating a haven in the otherwise industrial west of Melbourne.

Altona Memorial Park also features a recently refurbished crematorium and two chapels in addition to function facilities. Today it provides burial and cremation services for a broad cross-section of Melbourne's multicultural communities while also mirroring the working class history of Melbourne's west, even playing host to the grave of 'Mr. Football', Ted Whitten.

The main gates to the memorial park originally stood at the Eastern Market, Exhibition St, Melbourne.

== Notable interments ==
- Yvonne Barrett (1946–1985), 1960s pop singer
- Victor Peirce (1958–2002), underworld figure
- Ted Whitten (1933–1995), footballer
- Charlie Sutton (1924–2012), footballer
- Yvonne Barr (1932–2016), virologist
