= New Dream (band) =

Australian pop music group

- Also known as: The Dream
- Origin: Melbourne, Australia
- Genres: Pop; bubblegum pop
- Years active: 1967–1972; 1974
- Labels: Festival; Astor
- Past members: Mark Archer; Jenny Johnston; Alex Kadell (a.k.a. Alex Opitz); Jack McGrath; Peter Nicoll; Terry Stirzker; Brian Holloway; John du Bois; Peter Reed; Graham Jones

New Dream were an Australian pop music group formed in 1967 as The Dream when founding mainstays Jenny Johnston on organ and Alex Kadell (a.k.a. Alex Opitz) on lead vocals (both ex-Changing Times) joined with latter day members of the Final Four. The Dream's repertoire shifted to bubblegum pop and they changed their name in March 1969. Their most popular single, "Soft Delights" (May 1971), peaked at No. 21 on the Go-Set national top 40. They released a sole album, New Dream, in 1973, although they had disbanded late in the previous year. They briefly re-formed in 1974 before breaking up again.

== History ==
Late in 1967, Alex Kadell (a.k.a. Alex Opitz), the bass guitarist and lead vocalist of Melbourne pop music group Changing Times, and his band mate (and sometime domestic partner) Jenny Johnston on organ joined with local rival pop band the Final Four, to form another pop music group, the Dream. The Final Four's line-up had been Mark Archer on drums, Jack McGrath on guitar, Peter Nicoll on guitar, and Terry Stirzker on bass guitar. The Changing Times had formed in the mid-1960s; Johnston and Opitz joined in 1966 with Alan Eliot on drums and Lyn Thomas on lead guitar. That group later included Wayne Duncan on bass guitar (ex-Rondells) and Gary Young on drums (ex-Silhouettes, Rondells).

As a member of the Dream, Opitz used the name Kadell and concentrated on his lead vocals, with Stirzker providing bass guitar. The group performed on the local discotheque circuit. They released a single, "Who Could Be Loving You?", in 1968, via Festival Records as a cover version of Al Wilson's original. The B-side, "Mercy, Mercy, Mercy", was their rendition of Cannonball Adderley's 1966 hit. Both tracks were re-released for a split extended play, shared with two tracks by Festival label mates, Cam-Pact. The Dream played a support slot for United Kingdom visitors the Who and Small Faces in January 1968. Nicoll was replaced on guitar by Brian Holloway in June, who in turn left before the end of that year. The group changed their name to New Dream in March 1969 and their repertoire moved to bubblegum pop. They signed with Festival Records and issued their debut single, "Yours Until Tomorrow", in April 1969. The follow-up single, "Catching Up on Fun", appeared in July.

Their next single, "The Groupie" (March 1970), reached the top 30 on the Go-Set national top 40. It had been written by United States songwriter, James E "Buzz" Cason, and was originally performed by US group the Four Fuller Brothers. New Dream's version was recorded by the line-up of Johnston, Kadell and McGrath joined by John du Bois on bass guitar and Peter Reed on drums. In July Go-Set published their annual pop poll results as determined by its readers as most popular in various categories: New Dream were listed at No. 3 for group, Kadell at No. 4 for male, du Bois at No. 6 for guitarist and Reed at No. 6 for drummer.

New Dream's next single, "Soft Delights" (May 1971), became their highest charting when it reached No. 21. It is written by Australian-born UK-based, Mike Chapman, and was performed by his early UK group, Tangerine Peel. The group's next two singles, "Candy Love" (September) and "Turned 21" (March 1972), both charted. For the July 1971 Go-Set pop poll, listings were: Johnston at No. 5 for female, New Dream at No. 6 for group, du Bois at No. 6 for bass guitarist, "Soft Delight" at No. 7 for single and Reed at No. 8 for drummer. Du Bois left in January 1972 and was replaced by Graham Jones (ex-Iguana, Captain Australia and the Honky Tonk).

The new line-up issued further singles and recorded an eponymous debut album, which was produced by Brian Cadd. Australian musicologist Ian McFarlane described it as "a gloriously camp mix of the band's bubblegum hits, easy listening pop fluff replete with sweet harmonies and schmaltz strings." It appeared in 1973; however, the group had already disbanded late in the previous year. Kadell started his solo career while Reed joined Gary Young's Hot Dog. Johnston and Kadell reformed New Dream in 1974 for two more singles but McFarlane noted, "by that stage, the band's bubblegum pop sound had become outmoded."

== Members ==
- Mark Archer – drums (1967–69)
- Jenny Johnston – organ (1967–72, 1974)
- Alex Kadell (a.k.a. Alex Opitz) – lead vocals (1967–72, 1974)
- Jack McGrath – guitar, backing vocals (1967–71)
- Peter Nicoll – guitar (1967–68)
- Terry Stirzker – bass guitar (1967–70)
- Brian Holloway – guitar (1968)
- John du Bois – bass guitar (1970–72)
- Peter Reed – drums (1970–72)
- Graham Jones – bass guitar (1972)

== Discography ==
=== Studio albums ===
- New Dream (1973) – Festival Records (FL-34728)

=== Compilation albums ===
- Dream After Dream - The Complete Recordings of the New Dream (year unknown) – not on label

=== Extended plays ===
The Dream

- "Something Easy"/"Who Could Be Loving You?" (two tracks each by Cam-Pact and the Dream) (split EP, 1968) – Festival Records (FX-11496)

=== Singles ===
The Dream

- "Who Could Be Loving You?" (1968) – Festival Records (FK-2248)

New Dream

- "Yours Until Tomorrow" (1969) – Festival Records (FK-2865)
- "Catchin' Up on Fun" (1969) – Festival Records (FK-3102)
- "The Groupie" (1970) – Festival Records (FK-3405)
- "Soft Delights" (1971) – Festival Records (FK-4178)
- "Candy Love" (1971) – Festival Records (FK-4268)
- "Turned 21" (1972) – Festival Records (FK-4557)
- "Ride a White Swan" (1972) – Festival Records (FK-4916)
- "Girl I'm Gonna Get You" (1973) – Festival Records (FK-5001)
- "I Can't Stop Dancing (Dancing in the Dark)" (1974) – Astor Records (A-7264)
- "Schlick Schlack Boom Boom" (1974) – Astor Records (A-7242)
