= Benjamin Hugg =

Australian singer-songwriter

- Birth name: Benjamin Hugg
- Genres: pop
- Occupation(s): Singer, musician, songwriter
- Instrument(s): Vocals, guitar, piano
- Labels: Astor, Wizard

Benjamin Hugg is an Australian singer-songwriter, who had an Australian hit single in 1974 with "Thank God You're Here with Me" which reached No.36 on the Australian Kent Music Report.

In 1974, Hugg won "Best new Talent" at the King of Pop Awards.

== Discography ==
=== Albums ===
| Title | Album details | Peak chart positions |
| Title | Album details | AUS |
|---|---|---|
| Early One Morning | Released: July 1974; Format: LP; Label: Astor (ALPS 1038) | 68 |
| What's Been Happening? | Released: 1976; Format: LP; Label: Wizard Records (ZL-216) | - |

=== Singles ===
| Year | Title | Peak chart positions | Album |
| Year | Title | AUS | Album |
|---|---|---|---|
| 1974 | "Thank God You're Here With Me" | 36 | Early One Morning |
| 1974 | "Michinberry Walk" | - | Early One Morning |
| 1976 | "What's Been Happening" | - | What's Been Happening |

== Awards and nominations ==
=== King of Pop Awards ===
The King of Pop Awards were voted by the readers of TV Week. The King of Pop award started in 1967 and ran through to 1978.

| Year | Nominee / work | Award | Result |
|---|---|---|---|
| 1974 | himself | Best New Talent | Won |
