= Swallow's Juniors =

- Genre: Talent show
- Running time: 6:30 pm–
- Country of origin: Australia
- Language: English
- Home station: 3DB
- Hosted by: John Eden; Brian Naylor
- Original release: 1950s – 1960s

Swallow's Juniors
- Also known as: Brian and the Juniors
- Genre: Talent show
- Presented by: Brian Naylor
- Country of origin: Australia
- Original language: English

Original release
- Network: HSV-7
- Release: November 1957 – 1970

Swallow's Juniors is an Australian radio and television series, which aired on 3DB (Melbourne) at 6.30 pm on a Saturday evening, from the 1950s and into the early 1960s. It was telecast from November 1957 to 1970 on Melbourne television station HSV-7. There was a period of radio/TV simulcasting before it was exclusively telecast.

It was a talent contest featuring young performers, and was initially hosted by 3DB breakfast announcer John Eden. However Brian Naylor soon took over as compere. In 1964, the title was changed to Brian and the Juniors.

The series was one of several talent shows broadcast on HSV-7 during 1957, the others including Stairway to the Stars (1956-1958) and Swallows Parade (1957). Under the Swallow's Juniors title, it was one of several Australian television series of the 1950s to feature the sponsor's name in the title. Others included The Dulux Show, The Astor Show, Astor Showcase, and The Pressure Pak Show.

The concept of a variety program featuring a junior cast was revisited with Young Talent Time in 1971 on Network Ten which also featured some former Juniors cast members including Debbie Byrne, Jane Scali and Jamie Redfern.

== See also ==
- Young Talent Time
