= Jamie Redfern =

English-born Australian TV presenter and singer

- Born: 9 April 1957 (age 69); Liverpool, England, United Kingdom
- Origin: Melbourne, Victoria, Australia
- Genre: Pop
- Occupations: Singer, TV presenter, TV personality
- Instrument: Vocals
- Years active: 1964–present
- Label: Festival

Jamie Redfern (born 9 April 1957) is an Australian television presenter and personality and pop singer. Redfern was an original cast member of children's variety show, Young Talent Time from April 1971 to early 1972, before leaving the show to tour in the US with Liberace. According to Australian musicologist, Ian McFarlane, he "possessed a booming, mature voice which belied his tender age... [he] scored four Top 40 hit singles and sold more than $1.3 million worth of records." His equal highest-charting singles were the double-A sided covers of "Rainbow on the River"/"We'll Meet Again" (November 1972), and "Venus" (August 1973), which each peaked at No. 8 on the Go-Set national charts.

== Biography ==
Jamie Redfern was born on 9 April 1957 in Liverpool to Sam and Mary Redfern; he has five siblings. The family emigrated to Australia and settled in Melbourne. He took singing lessons with United States-born theatre actor and singer, Evie Hayes. He made his TV debut in 1964 on Brian and the Juniors, a children's variety-talent series, hosted by Brian Naylor on HSV-7 and remained with the show until 1970. In 1968 he appeared alongside Happy Hammond in an early colour television demonstration for the same channel. Redfern also guested on Happening '70 (1970) and Happening '71 (1971), which were co-produced by former pop star, Johnny Young, and his associate, Kevin Lewis.

In April 1971 Redfern became an original cast member of the Australian children's variety show, Young Talent Time, hosted by Young and co-produced by Lewis and Young. Hayes was a long-term judge on the program. He was appointed to the Young Talent team without an audition. Young recalled "He came in, he was only 13, 14 or something, and … what a voice. He could just stand there and sing a song without any accompaniment. You know, the true boy soprano with a really, really big powerful voice." His father, Sam, was his road manager and his brother, Derek, was a latter day Young Talent team member.

Young arranged to have Redfern signed with Festival Records, which issued his debut single in 1971. It was a cover version of "The Little White Cloud", which peaked in the Go-Set National Top 60. It was recorded as part of his debut album, When You Wish upon a Star (1971), at T.C.S. Studios, Melbourne, with Young as record producer. The album peaked at No. 16 on the Go-Set Top 20. At the TV Week King of Pop Awards for 1971, he won the Outstanding Newcomer category, which was presented by visiting US entertainer, Liberace. His second single, "When You Wish upon a Star" (1971) reached the Go-Set Top 40 in February of the following year. At the end of 1971, Redfern was named "Most Outstanding Newcomer" in the TV Week King of Pop Ceremony.

In mid-1972 Redfern toured the US with his mentor, Liberace. He was described by Australian Women's Weekly's Dita Cobb as "a lovely contrast to the local product of his age. Americans adore him. He is so fresh and funny and unassuming and downright young. Nothing seems to have gone to his head." Redfern remembered his early US performances, "lt was great... I was nervous at first. I got songs in the wrong order and the band was playing different music from what I was singing. But it soon straightened out, and I loved the excitement every night."

At the TV Week King of Pop Awards for 1972 he won Most Popular Australian Album for When You Wish upon a Star. His second studio album, Sitting on Top of the World (1972), also reached No. 16. It provided a double-A sided single with his versions of "Rainbow on the River"/"We'll Meet Again" (November 1972), which peaked at No. 8. At 15 he was the youngest Australian artist to have a top 10 hit until Nikki Webster's "Strawberry Kisses" in June 2001.

In January 1973 he briefly returned to Australia to record an album, Johnny Young, The Young Talent Team and Jamie Redfern Sing the Hits! (1973), he provided lead vocals for "Waltzing Matilda" and joined the then-current Young Talent Team on two tracks; his brother, Derek, sang lead for another track, "Puppy Love". His next single, "Venus" (1973), was a cover version of Frankie Avalon's song, which peaked at No. 8. For most of that year, Redfern was in the US for another touring stint with Liberace.

Redfern's third studio album, Hitch a Ride on a Smile (1974), provided the title track as its lead single in March, which reached the top 30. Also that year he was dubbed the King of Pop at the TV Week King of Pop Awards for 1974. In the following year he provided a compilation album, Jamie Redfern's Golden Hits. According to Australian music historian, Ian McFarlane, Redfern "slipped from view" during that year.

In May 1977 he was interviewed for Flashez, a youth pop show on ABC TV. In April 1981 he told John Vidler of The Australian Women's Weekly's TV World that he was performing regularly at Sydney RSL and Leagues Clubs and clubs in Melbourne. He also worked as a singing instructor and "tries his hand at penning a few songs." He presented Jamie Redfern's Rascals on Aurora TV.

=== Personal life ===
Jamie Redfern married Judy, a former dancer, in about 1987, they have two children and divorced amicably in 2020. He was the director of the Australian Showbusiness Academy, which ran talent schools in Melbourne's western suburbs. Redfern told Dani Valent of The Sydney Morning Herald, "If I hadn't been a singer I would have been an Anglican minister. My faith has always been strong and I've got that need and desire to help people and to understand them." He told Joel Dwyer of Star Weekly that his time in the US ended as "My contracts in Australia were about to run out. There was only about a month to go... but at that time my voice was changing and the keys were having to be brought down... I asked them to give me a break for a year, but nobody did and nobody listened. I do feel a bit resentful about that now. Being a singing teacher, I look after kids' voices and I am very aware of when you need rest and why."

== Discography ==
=== Studio albums ===
List of albums, with Australian chart positions
Title	Album details	Peak chart positions
Title	Album details	AUS
When You Wish upon a Star	Released: 1971; Format: LP; Label: Festival (SFL-934426)	20
Sitting on Top of the World	Released: November 1972; Format: LP; Label: Festival (FL 34671)	6
Hitch a Ride on a Smile	Released: October 1974; Format: LP; Label: Festival (L 35285)	56
Jamie Redfern's Golden Hits	Released: 1975; Format: LP; Label: Festival (L35724); Compilation album	—

=== Singles ===
List of singles, with selected chart positions
Title	Year	Peak chart positions
Title	Year	AUS
"The Little White Cloud"	1971	39
"When You Wish upon a Star"	1971	31
"Rainbow on the River"/"We'll Meet Again"	1972	5
"Venus"	1973	5
"Hello, Funny Face"	1973	65
"Hitch a Ride on a Smile"	1974	20
"Jenny"	1974	—

== Awards and nominations ==
=== Go-Set Pop Poll ===
The Go-Set Pop Poll was coordinated by teen-oriented pop music newspaper, Go-Set and was established in February 1966 and conducted an annual poll during 1966 to 1972 of its readers to determine the most popular personalities.

Year	Nominee / work	Award	Result
1972	himself	Best Australian Newcomer	5th

=== King of Pop Awards ===
The King of Pop Awards were voted by the readers of TV Week. The King of Pop award started in 1967 and ran through to 1978.

Year	Nominee / work	Award	Result
1971	himself	Outstanding Newcomer	Won
1972	When You Wish Upon a Star	Most Popular Australian Album	Won
1973	"Venus"	Most Popular Australian Single	Won
1974	himself	King of Pop	Won
1974	"Hitch a Ride"	Most Popular Australian Single	Won

=== Logie Awards ===
The Logie Awards is an annual gathering to celebrate Australian television, sponsored and organised by magazine TV Week, with the first ceremony in 1959, known then as the TV Week Awards, the awards are presented in 20 categories representing both public and industry voted awards.

Year	Nominee / work	Award	Result
Logie Awards of 1972	himself	George Wallace Memorial Logie for Best New Talent	Won

- Note: wins only
