= Jamie Churchill =

Australian television personality

- Born: 26 May 1976 (age 50); Canberra, Australia
- Occupations: television personality, singer, actor
- Known for: Young Talent Time, Neighbours, Winners

Jamie Churchill (born 26 May 1976) is an Australian television personality. Born in Canberra, he was raised in Hobart, Tasmania. Jamie is most well known for his stint in Network 10's Young Talent Time in 1988. He was the penultimate performer to join the show, as it was axed by Network 10 in January 1989.

== Young Talent Team ==
Jamie was first discovered by Johnny Young when the show was doing some Christmas specials in Tasmania. Jamie was given an audition and impressed with his 'Comical value'. Johnny later said that

"We've gotta have a comedian on the show, he'll do!".

He and his mother Janine moved to Melbourne so Jamie could join the Young Talent Team. His first song on the show was a version of Billy Ocean's "Get Outta My Dreams, Get into My Car". Jamie was the 39th member of the show, with John Nuich being the 40th and final member. As per normal on the show when male and female members are teamed up, Jamie was paired with Rikki Arnot. Their first song together was a version of Sonny and Cher's "I Got You Babe".

When the show was axed just six months after Jamie's first show, he and his mother decided to stay in Melbourne for the time being and continued to perform with other YTT members on Saturday morning TV and also starred in the made-for-video special Young Talent Time- Now...1990, starring the six members of the team that were there when YTT was cancelled.

== Other television appearances ==
Jamie did some acting after YTT. He played two different recurring roles in Neighbours. Between 1989 and 1990 he was 'Sean Jarrett' and then between 1992 and 1994, he played the role of 'Lenny Hooper'. He also starred as 'Mark' in Boy Soldiers, a 1990 episode of Winners.

He also appeared in some commercials, most notably for Janome Sewing Machines just after leaving YTT.
