= Paul O'Gorman =

- Occupations: Musician; singer-songwriter
- Instrument: Vocals
- Years active: 1976-present
- Label: Infinity

Paul O'Gorman is an Australian singer-songwriter, best known for his Australian charting singles "Ride Ride America" and "(You and Me and) Love in the Morning" in 1977 and 1978.

== Biography ==
O'Gorman begun writing songs in the early 1970's, while studying law at university and had notched up a few talent quest victories along with a handful of appearances on TV in Victoria.

Former Cherokees guitarist Doug Trevor saw O'Gorman, and the two began writing songs together. In 1976, O'Gorman entered the 1976 Australian Popular Song Festival, against big names, including Beeb Birtles.

In 1978, O'Gorman signed with Infinity records and released a number of singles a studio album before leaving it all behind to work behind the scenes in publishing, management and entertainment law.

== Discography ==
=== Studio albums ===
| Title | Album details |
|---|---|
| Poet and the Painter | Released: 1978; Format: LP, Compact Disc, cassette; Label: Infinity (L3655) |
| A Hard Act to Follow (with Kevin Johnson) | Released: 1987; Format: LP, CD, cassette; Label: BBC Radioplay Music (TAIR87055) |

=== Singles ===
List of singles, with Australian chart positions
| Year | Title | Peak chart positions | Album |
| Year | Title | AUS | Album |
|---|---|---|---|
| 1977 | "Ride Ride America " | 40 | Poet and the Painter |
| 1978 | "(You and Me And) Love in the Morning" | 54 | Poet and the Painter |
| 1978 | "You're More to Me " | - | Poet and the Painter |
| 1980 | "Play the Music" | - | |
| 1981 | "Hate to Say Goodnight " | - | |
| 1986 | "In the Name of Peace" | - | |

== Awards and nominations ==
=== King of Pop Awards ===
The King of Pop Awards were voted by the readers of TV Week. The King of Pop award started in 1967 and ran through to 1978.

| Year | Nominee / work | Award | Result |
|---|---|---|---|
| 1978 | himself | Most Popular New Talent | Won |
