= Non Stop Dancers =

Australian musical group (1983–1986)

- Origin: Sydney, New South Wales, Australia
- Genres: Pop; funk
- Years active: 1983–1986
- Label: EMI
- Past members: Kevin Jones; Karen Steains; Jane Stewart; Brett Van Kriedt; Larry Van Kriedt

Non Stop Dancers were an Australian pop, funk band formed in 1984 by Kevin Jones on guitar and vocals, Karen Steains on bass guitar, Jane Stewart on keyboards, Brett Van Kriedt on drums, and his brother, Larry Van Kriedt on saxophone, guitar and vocals (ex-AC/DC, Eighty Eights). They released a full-length album, Surprise Surprise, in December 1984. Their second single, "Shake this City", reached the Top 50 on the Kent Music Report Singles Chart. The group broke up in late 1986.

== Discography ==
=== Studio albums ===
Title	Album details
Surprise Surprise	Released: December 1984; Format: LP, cassette; Label: EMI Music (EMX.430019)

=== Singles ===
List of singles, with Australian chart positions
Year	Title	Peak chart positions
Year	Title	AUS
1983	"Only One"	-
1984	"Shake this City"	44
1984	"Mobbing Me"	-
1985	"Dancing"	-
1986	"Lost and Found"	-
