= Jane Scali =

Australian singer (born 1959)

- Born: 8 August 1959 (age 65); Melbourne, Australia
- Occupation(s): Singer, TV personality
- Years active: 1968–present
- Awards: Mo Award

Jane Scali (born 8 August 1959) is an Australian singer and former TV personality. She was one of the original cast members of the long-running TV show Young Talent Time from 1971 to 1976.

== Early life ==
Scali was a cast member in the junior variety show Brian And The Juniors, produced at HSV-7 in the late 1960s.

In 1971, at the age of 11, Scali joined the cast of a new TV show, Young Talent Time. It was scheduled to run for a 13-week season, but it became very successful and Scali was part of the show for five years.

== Career ==
Scali was a regular performer on a number of Australian TV shows, such as the Rolf Harris Show, The Saturday Show and later appeared on shows such as Good Morning Australia, Midday, the Royal Children's Hospital Good Friday Appeal and In Melbourne Tonight.

Scali performed in musical theatre for the first time when she was 17, as the lead role in the Melbourne Theatre Company's production of Cinderella. Other musical theatre roles in her career have included Gretchen in The Student Prince, Sandy in Grease and Lily St Regis in Annie. In 1995, she co-produced a musical comedy production entitled Fractured Fairytales, which was nominated for a Mo Award.

Scali has performed the Australian national anthem at a number of sporting events, such as the Bledisloe Cup, as well as the opening ceremonies of stadiums.

In 1989 Scali released the song "Go The Mighty Panthers" which has been used as the theme song of the Penrith Panthers Rugby League Club ever since and is played at the Penrith Stadium after every home game.

== Awards ==
=== Mo Awards ===
The Australian Entertainment Mo Awards (commonly known informally as the Mo Awards), were annual Australian entertainment industry awards. They recognised achievements in live entertainment in Australia from 1975 to 2016. Jane Scali won seven awards in that time.

Year	Nominee / work	Award	Result (wins only)
1987	Jane Scali	Daily Telegraph Reader Award	Won
1990	Jane Scali	Female Vocal Cabaret Performer of the Year	Won
1991	Jane Scali	Female Vocal Variety Performer of the Year	Won
1992	Jane Scali	Female Vocal Variety Performer of the Year	Won
1996	Jane Scali	Female Vocal Variety Performer of the Year	Won
1997	Jane Scali	Female Vocal Variety Performer of the Year	Won
1998	Jane Scali	Female Vocal Variety Performer of the Year	Won
