= Preston Cemetery =

Cemetery in Bundoora, Victoria, Australia

Preston General Cemetery
- Interactive map of Preston General Cemetery

Details
- Established: 1864
- Location: Bundoora, Victoria
- Country: Australia
- Coordinates: 37.7196°S 145.0406°E
- Owned by: Greater Metropolitan Cemeteries Trust
- Size: 14 acres (5.7 ha)
- No. of interments: >24,000
- Website: Official website
- Find a Grave: Preston General Cemetery

Preston General Cemetery is located in the northern Melbourne suburb of Bundoora, Victoria, Australia. The main entrance is on Plenty Road, Bundoora. The Cemetery is managed by Greater Metropolitan Cemeteries Trust (GMCT). Preston Cemetery contains the largest public mausoleum in the southern hemisphere.

== History ==
Originally called McLean's Cemetery, Darebin Creek Cemetery and then the Strathallan Cemetery, Preston General Cemetery was established in 1864.

In March 2010, the Fawkner Memorial Park Trust was amalgamated with 7 other Trusts and formed the Greater Metropolitan Cemeteries Trust (GMCT) which now manages the Preston Cemetery and 18 other sites.

== War graves ==
The cemetery contains the war graves of 34 Commonwealth service personnel of World War II.
