= Karen Knowles =

- Born: 4 March 1964 (age 62); Melbourne, Victoria, Australia
- Genres: Adult contemporary
- Occupations: Singer-songwriter, entertainer
- Instrument: Vocals
- Years active: 1975–present
- Label: Fable Records (1980–84)

Karen Knowles (born 4 March 1964) is an Australian singer-songwriter and record producer, and former television personality.

== Biography ==
=== 1975-1980s: Early career ===
Knowles was educated in Melbourne at the Methodist Ladies' College. She became nationally famous on the popular television program Young Talent Time, and was a member of the Young Talent Team from 1975 to 1980. Knowles first appeared as a contestant on Young Talent Time in 1974 whilst attending Donvale Primary School east of Melbourne.

In 1980, she signed with Fable Records and became the first Australian schoolgirl to receive a Gold record with her Top Ten single "Why Won't You Explain" in 1981. Her first album You Are The Reason was certified platinum in 1982.

Her second album, Loves Us All, was also released in 1982. In 1983, her third album The Third Time was released and she had a Top 30 single "You Don't Know Love" in 1984. In 1984 Knowles left the Fable label and moved to London.

=== 1988–2000: Return to Australia ===
Knowles returned to Australia in 1988 and featured in the stage musical Big River during its eighteen-month national tour. For her performance as southern belle, Mary Jane Wilks, Knowles received a nomination for a Green Room Award for Best Supporting Actress in a Musical.

In 1990, Knowles joined The Seekers. In 1991, along with the group's main songwriter Bruce Woodley and the National Boys Choir, she recorded the song I Am Australian.

In 1991 Knowles recorded and produced her fourth album A Night of Carols, featuring the Australian Girls Choir. In 1992, Knowles traveled to the United States to record Moonglow, her fifth album.

During 1997 Knowles wrote and performed a new musical composition at the Aboriginal Reconciliation Convention. In 1998, Knowles was appointed as one of the Inaugural Ambassadors for Reconciliation by the Council for Aboriginal Reconciliation. Also in 1998, she was nominated for an Australian Humanitarian Award for her Services to the Arts.

In 1999 Knowles recorded and released her sixth album By Request, a compilation of some her most requested songs.

== Discography ==
=== Studio albums ===
List of albums, with selected chart positions
Title	Album details	Peak chart positions	Certification
Title	Album details	AUS	Certification
You Are the Reason	Released: August 1981; Format: LP, cassette; Label: Fable (FBSA074)	20	AUS: Platinum
Love Us All	Released: May 1982; Format: LP, Cassette; Label: Fable (FBSA075)	42	
The Third Time	Released: December 1982; Format: LP, Cassette; Label: Fable (FBSA076)	99	
Especially for You	Released: 1984; Format: LP, Cassette; Label: Fable (FABA103)	–	
Moonglow	Released: 1992; Format: CD, Cassette; Label: VTL (VTL 017)	–	
By Request	Released: 1999; Format: CD; Label: Karen Knowledge (KCD021)	–	

=== Compilation albums ===
List of albums, with selected chart positions
Title	Album details	Peak chart positions
Title	Album details	AUS
Wish I Was Loving You	Released: August 1983; Format: LP, Cassette; Label: J&B (JB145)	19

=== Singles ===
List of singles, with selected chart positions
Year	Title	Peak chart positions	Certification
Year	Title	AUS	Certification
1980	"Why Won't You Explain"	12	AUS: Gold
1981	"You Are the Reason" / "One Step from Your Arms"	46	
1981	"I Never Said I Love You"	–	
1982	"Just for That"	–	
1982	"Love Us All"	–	
1983	"You Don't Know Love"	–	

== Awards and nominations ==
=== TV Week / Countdown Awards ===
Countdown was an Australian pop music TV series on national broadcaster ABC-TV from 1974 to 1987, it presented music awards from 1979 to 1987, initially in conjunction with magazine TV Week. The TV Week / Countdown Awards were a combination of popular-voted and peer-voted awards.

Year	Nominee / work	Award	Result
1980	Herself	Best New Talent	Nominated
