= Marcie and The Cookies =

Australian musical ensemble

Marcie & The Cookies were an Australian musical ensemble, made up of Marcie Jones (1945–2025) and the three Cook sisters. The all-girl, vocal-only group, were a rarity in Australia's "mod" music scene of the 1960s, dominated as it was by all-male rock bands and solo artists.

== Personnel ==
- Marcie Jones (vocals)
- Beverley Cook (vocals)
- Margaret Cook (vocals)
- Wendy Cook (vocals)

== History ==
Marcie Jones was born in Melbourne, Victoria on 26 June 1945. She started as a teenager with The Thunderbirds at Canterbury Ballroom and Preston Town Hall in Melbourne, Australia, in the early 1960s. She then went on to perform with Normie Rowe's band The Playboys and appeared on the "Go-Show". She issued five singles from 1965 to 1967 on the Sunshine label with some minor chart success.

=== 1967–1972: Marcie and The Cookies ===
In 1967, on the suggestion of Normie Rowe, she teamed up with the Cook sisters (who were already performing as "The Cookies" ) in Brisbane. Marcie & The Cookies were in the mould of such U.S. acts as The Supremes and The Crystals. In early 1968 they came to the attention of "The Twilights" and "The Groove's" Manager Garry Spry, who was so impressed by them he became their manager. Spry got them a recording contract with EMI Music and put them with his all-powerful entertainment agency A.M.B.O. Within 12 months they had become widely known for Jones's powerful voice and the Cookies' superb vocal harmonies and their synchronised stage movements as a result of their appearances on national TV shows, particularly on the pop music The Go!! Show. They toured Australia as support act for overseas artists such as The Monkees on their Australian September 1968 tour.

That same year Marcie & The Cookies were presented the "Best Female Act for 1968" award by national pop magazine Go-Set and were awarded the "Critics Award" for the top Australian vocal act.

As a group they released only two singles. They were in demand for session work such as on the Tony Worsley & The Blue Jays track, "Something's Got a Hold on Me". During 1969 the group toured South East Asia for three months performing in Singapore, Malaysia, Hong Kong, Thailand and the Philippines. The tour included performances to Vietnam War servicemen at American bases.

After more than two years overseas Jones decided to return home to Australia, leaving the Cook sisters to continue on as backing singers. With Peter Williams, they went on to form a new group called Spirit of Progress who recorded a couple of singles on the Philips label and were the support act also for Cliff Richard on tour.

=== 1973–2025: Marcie Jones solo ===
On returning to Australia, Jones then resumed her solo career with a new manager and record label, Atlantic. She released an album and five singles between 1973 and 1976, the second of which, "Gonna Get Married", was her best chart success in 1974. The single "Baby I Need Your Loving" from 1975 was produced by Del Shannon.

Jones continued to perform both solo and with The Cookies (under the name of Marcie Jones and The Cookies), in stage shows, clubs, concerts and tours supporting major overseas artists. In their 40-year career they toured with The Monkees, Gene Pitney, Cliff Richard, The Shadows, Roy Orbison, Tom Jones, Del Shannon, Ray Stevens and other performers. They performed a mixture of sixties and soul, ballads and rock.

Jones embraced the country genre in 1999 by releasing a CD of that music.

In mid-2008, Jones became a presenter on 100.7 Highlands FM, a community radio station based in the Macedon Ranges in Victoria, Australia, where she co-hosted a weekly show entitled "Blonde and Blonder".

In December 2008, Network Creative Services published her 400-page autobiography "Runs in the Blood". The book deals with Jones's entertainment career, the Australian franchise of Koala Blue, the break-up with Australian 'King of Pop' Normie Rowe, arriving at hospital to give birth with Gerry Marsden (of Merseybeat fame), having her second child born premature, and performing for the Pope.

Marcie Jones died after suffering from leukaemia, on 31 May 2025, at the age of 79.

== Discography ==
=== Marcie and The Cookies singles ===
Year	Title
1968	"All Or Nothing" / "I Would If I Could"
1968	"White Christmas" / "You on My Mind"

=== Marcie Jones Studio albums ===
List of albums, with Australian chart positions
Title	Album details	Peak chart positions
Title	Album details	AUS
That Girl Jones	Released: July 1974; Format: LP; Label: Atlantic (SD 60001)	52

=== Marcie Jones singles ===
List of singles, with Australian chart positions
Year	Title	Peak chart positions	Album
Year	Title	AUS	Album
1965	"Quiet" / "I Wanna Know"	-	non album single
1965	"Imagine" / "When A Girl Falls in Love"	-	non album single
1966	"Danny Boy" / "That Hurts"	-	non album single
1967	"That's The Way It Is" / "Big Lovers Come in Small Packages"	-	non album single
1967	"You Can't Bypass Love" / "He's Gonna Be Fine Fine Fine"	-	non album single
1973	"Armed and Extremely Dangerous" / "Over the Rainbow"	71	That Girl Jones
1974	"Gonna Get Married" / "I Found My Freedom"	37	That Girl Jones
1974	"I Only Have Eyes For You" / "Gonna Make It"	99	That Girl Jones
1975	"Baby I Need Your Loving" / "Hurts So Good"		That Girl Jones
1976	"Back in Your Arms Again" / "I Like Your Music"	-	non album single
