= Young Talent Time =

Television series

- 2012 logo
- Genre: Variety
- Created by: Kevin Lewis; Johnny Young
- Presented by: Johnny Young (1971–1988); Rob Mills (2012)
- Opening theme: Young Talent Time
- Ending theme: "All My Loving" by Johnny Young (original series)
- Country of origin: Australia
- Original language: English
- No. of seasons: 18 (1971–1988); 1 (2012)
- No. of episodes: 804 (1971–1988); 15 (2012)

Production
- Executive producers: Johnny Young; Kevin Lewis (1971–1975)
- Production locations: ATV-0, Melbourne, Victoria (1971–1988); Fox Studios, Sydney, New South Wales (2012)
- Running time: 44 minutes
- Production companies: Lewis/Young Productions (1971–1975); Television House (1976–1988); Granada Media Australia (2012)

Original release
- Network: Network Ten
- Release: 24 April 1971 – 23 December 1988
- Release: 22 January – 4 May 2012

Young Talent Time is an Australian television variety program produced by Lewis-Young Productions and screened on Network Ten. The original series ran from 1971 until 1988 and was hosted by singer-songwriter and record producer Johnny Young for its entire run. The show was briefly revived by Network Ten in 2012 and was hosted by singer and actor Rob Mills.

== History ==
The series featured a core group of young performers, in the vein of The Mickey Mouse Club, and a weekly junior talent quest. The regular cast known as "The Young Talent Team" performed popular classic songs along with the top hit songs of the day. The original program launched the careers of a number of Australian performers including Sally Boyden, Jamie Redfern, Vikki Broughton, Debra Byrne (billed then as Debbie), Tina Arena and Dannii Minogue and spawned numerous hit singles, fifteen Young Talent Time albums, a film, as well as merchandise including swap cards, boardgames, toys, and mugs. The program won numerous Logie Awards.

== Young Talent Time (1971–1988) ==
=== Production details ===
Young Talent Time was produced as a joint venture by Lewis-Young Productions (the production partnership between host Johnny Young and his friend and colleague Kevin Lewis, one of the directors of Festival Records) and was taped mainly at the studios of ATV-10 in Nunawading, Melbourne although occasional shows were taped at the TEN-10 studios in Sydney or on location.

Many of the episodes from the early- to mid-1970s no longer exist as the tapes were wiped for re-use, being the official Network Ten policy at the time. Some later episodes from the series were repeated by pay TV broadcaster Foxtel in the late 1990s.

On average, 44 episodes were produced per year for 18 years. The episodes were broadcast in black and white from April 1971 to April 1975, thereafter in colour. The final episode aired on 23 December 1988.

==== Caravan Holiday ====
In the Christmas break between the first and second seasons of Young Talent Time, Johnny Young and the Young Talent Team shot a 22-minute colour film. (At the time, Young Talent Time still screened in black and white on Australian television.) Sponsored by the Caravan Trade & Industries Association Caravan Holiday was completed by early 1972 and released in cinemas across Australia as a supporting feature to Peter Bogdanovich's hugely popular US comedy picture What's Up, Doc? which starred Barbra Streisand and Ryan O'Neal.

The cast featured the then-current line-up of the Young Talent Team (Jamie Redfern, Rod Kirkham, Greg Mills, Philip Gould, Julie Ryles, Debbie Byrne, Vikki Broughton and Jane Scali) prior to Redfern's departure to tour the US with Liberace. Despite not appearing in the film, new team member Trevor Hindmarch turned up to the premiere, as seen in the documentary Young Talent Time Tells All.

It featured actor-comedian Buster Fiddess (as Mr Crawley) and Addie Black, and guest appearances by Johnny Young (in multiple cameos as a service station attendant, farmer, caravan site manager and speedboat lake), Evie Hayes and John Farnham (then known as Johnny Farnham) as himself. Fiddess died just a few days after he finished filming his scenes. There was also a film clip made for the Young Talent Team's version of The Cowsills' hit song The Rain, The Park and Other Things, shot in Melbourne's Royal Botanic Gardens, but despite not appearing on the actual recording, being recorded prior to their recruitment, Mills and Ryles appeared in the clip.

It screened on television just once, on Christmas Eve 1972. It was then unseen for three decades until a restored version was featured as a bonus extra on the 2002 DVD Young Talent Time: The Collection (Universal Pictures - 2002).

In the opening credit sequence, Jane Scali's surname is misspelt as Scarli.

==== Alumni ====
Over the original run of the show, from 1971 to 1988, there were a total of 40 cast members.

Members of the cast who found continued success after leaving the series and continue working as performers include Tina Arena, Jane Scali, Jamie Redfern, Dannii Minogue, Karen Knowles, Sally Boyden, and Debra Byrne.

The show had a policy that when team members reached 16 years of age, they had to leave the series and move on, but this rule would subsequently be stretched and broken.

=== Concerts and live appearances ===
Over the 18 years of the original show, Johnny Young and the various cast members made numerous live appearances all over Australia, performing full concerts or short publicity appearances at various venues.

In 1973, Young, the cast and Denis Walter supported Jamie Redfern in a series of live concerts. The Jamie Redfern Show sold out a number of shows at Melbourne's Festival Hall.

In 1987, an unanticipated audience turnout of over 4,000 people caused trouble at a concert at the Westfield Shopping Centre, Parramatta. Some fans were crushed in the crowd after the concert. Joey Dee had to be treated for a knee injury and Courtney Compagnino had to be treated for shock.

In 1988, over 12,000 people attended an outdoor concert held in Brisbane at the 1988 World Expo, which was broadcast on television the following week.

At the end of 1988, Young and the cast performed a series of concerts. The final concert was held at the Melbourne Tennis Centre on 23 December, the same night on which the last episode of Young Talent Time aired on Network Ten.

=== Luna Park incident ===
In the early 1970s the cast performed at Luna Park Sydney. Due to the large crowd in attendance, they were unable to leave. Park management offered to stop the scenic railway so that the cast could exit through the tunnel. According to Greg Mills, the train driver was not told, and the train did not stop. The cast narrowly avoided death by pressing themselves against the wall of the tunnel. If not for Brad Boyden, Sally Boyden's father, neither of the team would have known that the roller coaster train was even approaching. Trevor Hindmarch came the closest to death or injury as his jacket was almost caught on the speeding vehicle as it passed. Fortunately Trevor lost only a button.

=== Final years ===
In 1988, an episode of Young Talent Time was shot in the United States. The two-hour special, Young Talent Time at Universal Studios, aired on 13 August 1988.

In its final years, Young Talent Time began to struggle for ratings, particularly following the decision of the Nine Network to move its popular early morning variety show Hey Hey It's Saturday to the 6:30 pm slot in 1985, which put it in direct competition to Young Talent Time.

After four years of dwindling ratings, in October 1988 Network Ten finally decided to move YTT to Friday nights at 7.30 pm, but the change did not help. The show was cancelled three months later. The general manager of Channel 10 Melbourne, Renny Cunnack, announced on 25 January 1989 that Young Talent Time would "not be resuming production in 1989". Cunnack himself was dismissed as General Manager three months later. The following day on Australia Day in 1989, the Young Talent Time cast performed a concert at the Sidney Myer Music Bowl in Melbourne.

Near the end of 1988, Johnny Young had invested a large amount of money in building his own TV studio complex in Richmond with the intention of producing the show himself and leasing it to Channel 10 but the termination of the show ended this plan and he was forced to sell his family home to finance his debts.

Network Ten continued airing compilation episodes in early 1989, initially as The Best of Young Talent Time at 7.30 on Friday nights, then as Young Talent Time Favorites at 11.00 on Saturday mornings. The last of these aired in Melbourne on Saturday 1 April 1989.

On September 26, 2021, Channel 10 aired a special anniversary edition of Young Talent Time. It marked the show's 50th anniversary.

=== List of team members 1971–1988 ===
- Vikki Broughton (1971–73) (first act to be signed)
- Rod Kirkham (1971–73)
- Phillip Gould (1971–75; 1975–76)
- Debra Byrne (1971–75)
- Jamie Redfern (1971–72)
- Jane Scali (1971–76)
- Greg Mills (1971–75)
- Julie Ryles (1971–76)
- Trevor Hindmarch (1972–77)
- Sally Boyden (1973–76)
- Derek Redfern (1973–76)
- Karen Knowles (1975–80)
- Steven Zammit (1975–80)
- Debbie Hancock (1976–79)
- Robert McCullough (1976–79)
- Nicole Cooper (1976–81)
- John Bowles (1977–81)
- Tina Arena (1977–83; longest-serving cast member)
- Bobby Driessen (1979–83)
- Jodie Loebert (1980–83)
- Joe(y) Perrone (1980–84)
- Michael Campbell (1981–83)
- Karen Dunkerton (1981–85)
- Katie Van Ree (1981–86)
- Mark McCormack (1982–83)
- Dannii Minogue (1982–88)
- Vince Del Tito (1983–88)
- Beven Addinsall (1983–88)
- Vanessa Windsor (1983–87)
- Greg Poynton (1984–88)
- Lorena Novoa (1984–87)
- Tim Nelson (1984–87)
- Natalie Miller (1985–88)
- Mark Stevens (1985–88)
- Courtney Compagnino (1986–88)
- Juanita Coco (1987–88)
- Joey Dee (1987–88)
- Rikki Arnot (1987–88)
- Jamie Churchill (1988)
- Johnnie Nuich (1988; shortest-serving cast member)

== The New Generation (1988) ==
In 1988 Johnny Young launched an American version of the show re-titled The New Generation.

Produced in Australia, it starred the current senior members of the former Young Talent Time cast: Dannii Minogue, Vince Del Tito, Natalie Miller, Lorena Novoa, Beven Addinsall; and a new member, Keith Williams, from Los Angeles. The show also featured regular appearances from the younger members of the former cast, who were billed as "The Young Generation": Jamie Churchill, Johnnie Nuich, Joey Dee, Courtney Compagnino, Juanita Coco and Rikki Arnot.

The New Generation was hosted by American Michael Young, the host of the Emmy Award winning Kids Are People Too. Thirteen 30-minute episodes were produced by Johnny Young's Television House and Fries Entertainment and screened on CBN Cable Network/The CBN Family Channel (now Freeform) in the US.

== Young Talent Time (1990) ==
In 1990 Johnny Young self-funded and produced a one-off direct-to-video special titled Young Talent Time Now - 1990. It featured the final six members of the cast (Jamie Churchill, Johnnie Nuich, Joey Dee, Courtney Compagnino, Juanita Coco, and Rikki Arnot) and former cast member Beven Addinsall.

== Young Talent Time (2012) ==
Network Ten and Granada Australia - in conjunction with Johnny Young and Johnny Young Music - were the producers of a revival of Young Talent Time. Taped before a live studio audience at Fox Studios in Sydney, the 15-episode series debuted on Network Ten across Australia at 6.30 pm on Sunday 22 January 2012.

Hosted by former Australian Idol 2003 contestant Rob Mills, the 2012 revival featured a regular Young Talent Team (of 10 members) performing a couple of group numbers each week, with one team member featuring in a solo spot each episode to showcase their individual talents. Starting from Episode 10, duets were sung instead of solos as each team member had performed a solo.

Each weekly episode featured three or four young contestants (or acts) under the age of 16. These solo performers, duos, groups, etc., included singers, dancers (ballet, hip hop, tap, jazz, etc.), musicians, sight acts, illusionists, comedians and so on. The winning contestant (or act) each week received $5,000 from NAB (National Australia Bank) and the Grand Final winner received $100,000. Sherrynne Johnson a young Tasmanian semi finals Winner was unable to return for the Grand Final due to unforeseen family circumstances.

The show's two judges/mentors were the original show's longest-serving Young Talent Team member Tina Arena (who appeared from 1977 to 1983 – six years 6 Months), and Filipino-American choreographer Charles Klapow, one of the winners of the Emmy Award for 'Outstanding Choreography' for High School Musical 2. Better known as 'Chucky' Klapow, he also helped choreograph the films Cheetah Girls 2, High School Musical and High School Musical 3: Senior Year as well as appearing in all three High School Musical movies as a dancer. He has choreographed for Mick Jagger and dances alongside Michael Jackson in the film Michael Jackson's This Is It. Klapow had previously been a judge on UK talent show Don't Stop Believing. When Tina Arena was ill for one episode, Ian Dickson filled in as judge, and continued in that role for the finals competition.

While the judges decided the winning contestant (or act) of each weekly episode, viewers could vote online for any of the weekly runners-up to become a 'wild-card' entrant, giving them a second chance of making it into the finals. On 20 March, it was announced that YTT would move to Fridays at 7:30 to 8:30, the current time slot of Glee. It is believed YTT was moved because of poor ratings on Sunday night resulting in the much more popular program The Biggest Loser taking the 6:30 to 7:30 timeslot. The YTT team then commenced a tour having shows in Melbourne, Sydney and Canberra. The Grand Final episode was aired on 4 May. The talent quest was won by first heat entrants and wildcard winners Lil' Banditz Krew. The all-boys Hip Hop troupe toured with the YTT team and Rob Mills in June and July 2012, visiting various Sydney venues as well as Melbourne and Canberra.

YTT was not renewed for a 2013 season because of poor ratings. However, Aydan, Lyndall, Adrien, Michelle and Tia went on to audition for future talent shows while Georgia-May worked with Disney Channel Australia. Aydan appeared on Australia's Got Talent in 2013 and auditioned for the 2017 and 2018 seasons of The Voice, being unable to turn a chair in 2017 but turning all four chairs in 2018. Aydan joined Joe Jonas' team and ultimately placed 4th place. After the show he started releasing his own music as well as being on Eurovision - Australia Decides in 2019. Aydan also starred in Stan’s streaming series Invisible Boys as Zeke Caligero in 2025. Lyndall auditioned on The Voice in 2015 and joined Delta Goodrem’s team and made it to the final six before being eliminated. Adrien auditioned for The X Factor in 2014 and was assigned to the Boys group mentored by Natalie Bassingthwaighte, but was eliminated in week 3. Both Tia and Michelle also auditioned for The Voice in 2017, with Tia unable to turn a chair while Michelle turning three chairs and ultimately joining Kelly Rowland’s team but was eliminated in the knockouts.

=== List of Team Members ===
- Aydan Calafiore
- Georgia-May Davis
- Nicolas Di Cecco
- Sean Emmett
- Tia Gigalotti
- Michelle Mutyora
- Adrien Nookadu
- Serena Suen
- Lyndall Wennekes
- Tyler Wilford

== Discography and videography ==
=== DVDs ===
A one-hour prime-time television documentary Young Talent Time Tells All aired on Network Ten on 29 October 2001. Produced and directed by former YTT cast member John Bowles, it was a tremendous ratings success celebrating the show's 30th anniversary. Bowles interviewed over thirty of the original cast members for the programme. Archive footage, including clips thought to have been lost, were interspersed with the YTT kids speaking about their experiences on and off-air.

A small reunion of YTT cast and crew members (including Tina Arena, Dannii Minogue and Johnny Young) was held in Melbourne in October 2003 to launch the release of an extended version of the Young Talent Time Tells All documentary on DVD (through Universal Pictures). The original documentary TV Special was extended, and bonus features and rare footage, not seen in the television version, were added. It was titled Young Talent Time: The Collection.

Bonus features on the DVD include a restored version of the 1972 short film Caravan Holiday featuring Johnny Young and the Young Talent Team; full biographies of all 40 Team Members and Johnny Young; Nicole Kidman's appearance as a guest on the show to promote her 1983 film BMX Bandits; assorted television commercials featuring members of the team; footage of some of the Team when they appeared as contestants on the show; and the full-length clip of sisters Dannii Minogue and Kylie Minogue performing the song "Sisters Are Doing It For Themselves".

Rare footage includes a nine-year-old Jamie Redfern (pre-Young Talent Time) appearing with Happy Hammond on a Channel Seven test broadcast of colour television in 1968, seven years before Australian television actually began broadcasting in colour.

=== Albums ===
List of albums, with Australian chart positions
Title	Album details	Peak chart positions
Title	Album details	AUS
Young Talent Time	Released: 1971; Format: LP; Label: Festival Records	-
Young Talent Time: Volume 2	Released: 1972; Format: LP; Label: Festival Records	-
Young Talent Time: Volume 3 (also known as Sing the Hits)	Released: November 1973; Format: LP; Label: L&Y Records (L25050)	50
Young Talent Time: Volume 4 (as Johnny Young and the Young Talent Team)	Released: 1974; Format: LP; Label: L&Y Records (L25155)	-
Young Talent Time: Favourite Hits - Volume 5 (as Johnny Young and the Young Talent Team)	Released: 1975; Format: LP; Label: L&Y Records (L25207)	-
Johnny Young & The Young Talent Team: Mother's Favourites (as Johnny Young and the Young Talent Team)	Released: 1976; Format: LP; Label: L&Y Records (L25261)	-
The Young Talent Team Salutes ABBA (as Johnny Young and the Young Talent Team)	Released: 1976; Format: LP; Label: L&Y Records (L25275)	-
Tiny Tina and Little John (Tina Arena & Johnny Bowles)	Released: 1977; Format: LP; Label: Pisces Records (L 27025)	-
Sing the Hits (as Johnny Young and the Young Talent Team)	Released: May 1980; Format: LP; Label: J&B (JB049); Compilation album	87
Just for Fun (as Johnny Young and the Young Talent Team)	Released: 1980; Format: LP; Label: Hammard (HAM 066)	-
10th Anniversary Album	Released: May 1981; Format: LP, Cassette; Label: K-Tel (NA 569); Compilation album	58
Now And Then 15th Anniversary Album	Released: 1985; Format: LP, Cassette; Label: Hammard (HAM 128); Compilation album	93
Young Talent Team: Phenomenon	Released: 1987; Format: LP, Cassette; Label: Hammard (HAM 168)	-
Super Hits 88/89 (as The New Young Talent Team)	Released: 1988; Format: LP, Cassette; Label: Hammard (HAM 181)	-
Johnny Young & The Young Talent Teams: The Final Farewell (as Johnny Young & The Young Talent Teams)	Released: 1989; Format: 2x Cassette; Label: Hammard (HAM 181)	-

== Awards ==
=== TV Week Logie Awards ===
- Best Australian Musical Variety Show of 1971
- Best Australian Musical Variety Show of 1973
- Best Australian Musical Variety Show of 1974
- Best Australian Musical Variety Show of 1975
- Award for Sustained Excellence (presented in 1982)
- Johnny Young - Logie Hall of Fame (1990)

== See also ==
- List of Australian music television shows
- List of longest-running Australian television series
