= Herman's Hermits discography =

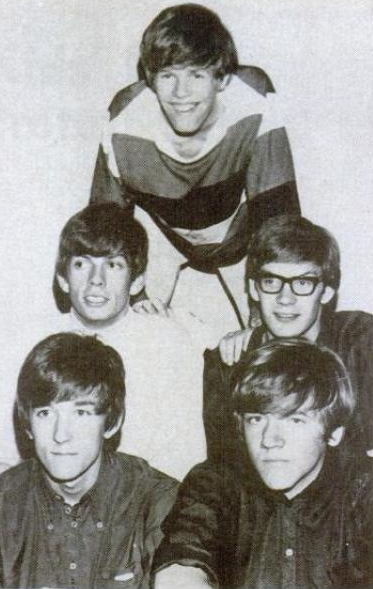
- Herman's Hermits in 1965
- Studio albums: 9
- Extended plays: 7
- Compilation albums: 15
- Singles: 39

The discography of the British beat band Herman's Hermits contains 9 studio albums, 15 compilation albums, 39 singles and other releases. Their debut single was 1964's "I'm into Something Good", released by Columbia in the UK and MGM Records in the US. The single was an immediate hit, reaching number 1 in the UK, number 13 on the US Billboard Hot 100, and number 7 in Canada.

The following single, "Show Me Girl", was successful in multiple territories but did not receive a North American release. In February 1965, MGM released the group's first album, Introducing Herman's Hermits, or Herman's Hermits, which peaked at number two on the Billboard Top LPs chart. The group achieved two US number 1 hits with "Mrs. Brown, You've Got a Lovely Daughter" and "I'm Henery the Eighth, I Am". Both singles were international hits, reaching high positions in South Africa, Canada, and Australia. In June, Herman's Hermits released their UK self-titled debut LP, which was their only studio album to chart in their home country, where it reached number 16. Their second album, Herman's Hermits on Tour also reached number 2 in the US, and was certified Gold by the RIAA. In 1966, the group collaborated with a number of other artists on When the Boys Meet the Girls, a soundtrack album for the movie starring American singer Connie Francis.

The group continued having a long string of top-40 pop singles, except in the US, when their airplay started drying up, and in 1968 their single "Sunshine Girl" failed to make the Billboard Hot 100, and no other single would break into it. In the UK, however, success continued. "Sunshine Girl" made the top ten, and "My Sentimental Friend" peaked at number two. The latter was their second number 1 in South Africa. In 1971, the group's compilation The Most of Herman's Hermits peaked at number 14 in the UK.

== Albums ==
=== Studio albums ===
| Year | Album details | | Peak positions | | | Certification |
| Year | United Kingdom release | United States/Canada release | UK | US | Can | Certification |
|---|---|---|---|---|---|---|
| 1965 | Herman's Hermits | Introducing Herman's Hermits | 16 | 2 | - | US: Gold |
| 1965 | Released: June 1965; Label: EMI/Columbia (33SX 1727) | Released: February 1965; Label: MGM (E/SE-4282) | 16 | 2 | - | US: Gold |
| 1965 | Herman's Hermits on Tour | | — | 2 | — | US: Gold |
| 1965 | Not released | Released: June 1965; Label: MGM (E/SE-4295); Certified Gold-RIAA | — | 2 | — | US: Gold |
| 1966 | Hold On! | | — | 14 | — | |
| 1966 | Not released | Released: March 1966; Label: MGM (E/SE-4342) | — | 14 | — | |
| 1966 | Both Sides of Herman's Hermits | | — | 48 | — | |
| 1966 | Released: October 1966; Label: EMI/Columbia (SX 6084) | Released: August 1966; Label: MGM (E/SE-4386) | — | 48 | — | |
| 1967 | There's a Kind of Hush All Over the World | | — | 13 | 6 | US: Gold |
| 1967 | Released: May 1967; Label: EMI/Columbia (SX/SCX 6174) | Released: March 1967; Label: MGM (E/SE-4438); Certified Gold-RIAA | — | 13 | 6 | US: Gold |
| 1967 | Blaze | | — | 75 | — | |
| 1967 | Not released | Released: September 1967; Label: MGM (E/SE-4478) | — | 75 | — | |
| 1968 | Mrs. Brown, You've Got a Lovely Daughter | | — | 182 | — | |
| 1968 | Released: August 1968; Label: EMI/Columbia (SX/SCX 6303) | Released: September 1968; Label: MGM (SE-4548ST) | — | 182 | — | |
| 2000 | A Whale of a Tale! And Others | | — | — | — | |
| 2000 | Released: 2000; Label: Pluto (No catalog number) | Not released | — | — | — | |
"—" denotes a release that did not chart or was not issued in that region. No Canadian RPM (magazine) album charts issued between October 1967 and October 1968.

=== Featured on ===
| Year | Album details | | Peak positions | |
| Year | United Kingdom release | United States release | UK | US |
|---|---|---|---|---|
| 1966 | When the Boys Meet the Girls | | — | 61 |
| 1966 | Released: May 1966; Label: MGM (C/CS-8006) | Released: February 1966; Label: MGM (E/SE-4334) | — | 61 |

=== Compilation albums ===
| Year | Album details | | Peak positions | | | Certification |
| Year | United Kingdom release | United States release | UK | US | Can | Certification |
|---|---|---|---|---|---|---|
| 1965 | The Best of Herman's Hermits | | — | 5 | 14 | US: Gold |
| 1965 | Not released | Released: November 1965; Label: MGM (E/SE-4315); Certified Gold RIAA | — | 5 | 14 | US: Gold |
| 1966 | The Best of Herman's Hermits, Vol. 2 | | — | 20 | — | US: Gold |
| 1966 | Not released | Released: December 1966; Label: MGM (E/SE-4416); Certified Gold RIAA | — | 20 | — | US: Gold |
| 1968 | The Best of Herman's Hermits, Vol. 3 | | — | 102 | — | |
| 1968 | Not released | Released: January 1968; Label: MGM (E/SE-4505) | — | 102 | — | |
| 1969 | The Best of Herman's Hermits | | — | — | — | |
| 1969 | Released: April 1969; Label: EMI/Columbia (SX 6332) | Not released | — | — | — | |
| 1971 | The Most of Herman's Hermits | | 14 | — | — | |
| 1971 | Released: September 1971; Label: EMI/Music For Pleasure (MFP 5216) | Not released | 14 | — | — | |
| 1972 | The Most of Herman's Hermits Volume 2 | | — | — | — | |
| 1972 | Released: 1972; Label: EMI/Music For Pleasure (MFP 50008) | Not released | — | — | — | |
| 1973 | Herman's Hermits XX (Their Greatest Hits) | | — | 202 | — | |
| 1973 | Not released | Released: 1973; Label: ABKCO (AB4227) | — | 202 | — | |
| 1977 | Herman's Hermits' Greatest Hits | | 37 | — | — | |
| 1977 | Released: September 1977; Label: K-Tel (NE 1001) | Not released | 37 | — | — | |
| 1984 | The Very Best of Herman's Hermits | | — | — | — | |
| 1984 | Released: 1984; Label: EMI/Music For Pleasure (MFP 41 5685 1) | Not released | — | — | — | |
| 1990 | Greatest Hits Volume 1 | | — | — | — | |
| 1990 | Not released | Released: 1990; Label: Fabulous Sounds (Fabulous Sounds SSI 752) | — | — | — | |
| 1994 | Mrs. Brown, You've Got a Lovely Daughter (compilation, not the 1968 studio release) | | — | — | — | |
| 1994 | Released: 1994; Label: Repertoire Records (REP 4424-WY) | Not released | — | — | — | |
| 2004 | Retrospective | | — | — | — | |
| 2004 | Not released | Released: 2004; Label: ABKCO Records (ABKCO 719228) | — | — | — | |
| 2008 | Herman's Hermits – Into Something Good: The Mickie Most Years 1964-1972 | | — | — | — | |
| 2008 | Released: 2008; Label: EMI (REP 228 4172) | Not released | — | — | — | |
| 2012 | The Very Best of Herman's Hermits | | — | — | — | |
| 2012 | Not released | Released: 2012; Label: ABKCO Records (ABKCO 8900-2) | — | — | — | |
| 2015 | The Best of Herman's Hermits: The 50th Anniversary Anthology | | — | — | — | |
| 2015 | Released: 2015; Label: Bear Family Records (BCD 17357) | Not released | — | — | — | |
"—" denotes a release that did not chart or was not issued in that region.

== Extended plays ==
=== UK extended plays ===
| Year | Album details |
|---|---|
| 1965 | Hermania: Released: January 1965; Label: EMI/Columbia (SEG 8380) |
| 1965 | Mrs. Brown, You've Got a Lovely Daughter: Released: June 1965; Label: EMI/Columbia (SEG 8440) |
| 1965 | Herman's Hermits Hits: Released: September 1965; Label: EMI/Columbia (SEG 8442) |
| 1966 | A Must to Avoid (EP): Released: February 1966; Label: EMI/Columbia (SEG 8477) |
| 1966 | Hold On!: Released: June 1966; Label: EMI/Columbia (SEG 8503) |
| 1967 | Dandy: Released: April 1967; Label: EMI/Columbia (SEG 8520) |
| 1968 | The London Look^{[A]}: Released: 1968; Label: SLE 15 |

Notes

- A The London Look was a promo-only EP sponsored by Yardley Cosmetics.

== Singles ==
| Year | Titles (A-side, US and UK B-sides) | Peak chart positions | | | | | | | | Certification | UK Album | US Album |
| Year | Titles (A-side, US and UK B-sides) | US | UK | NZ | CA | NO | SA | SE | AUS | Certification | UK Album | US Album |
|---|---|---|---|---|---|---|---|---|---|---|---|---|
| Aug. 1964 | "I'm into Something Good"; B-side: "Your Hand In Mine" | 13 | 1 | 8 | 7 | — | — | 5 | 11 | | A: The Best Of Herman's Hermits; B: Non-album track | Introducing Herman's Hermits |
| Nov. 1964 | "Show Me Girl"; B-side: "I Know Why" (Not released as a single in NA) | — | 19 | — | — | — | — | 19 | 25 | | A: The Best Of Herman's Hermits; B: Non-album track | Introducing Herman's Hermits |
| Jan. 1965 | "Can't You Hear My Heartbeat"; B-side: "I Know Why" (Not released as a single in the UK) | 2 | — | — | 3 | — | — | — | 3 | | A: The Best Of Herman's Hermits; B: Non-album track | A: Herman's Hermits On Tour; B: Introducing Herman's Hermits |
| Feb. 1965 | "Silhouettes"; UK B-side: "Can't You Hear My Heartbeat"; NA B-side: "Walkin' With My Angel" | 5 | 3 | 2 | 1 | — | — | 17 | — | | A & UK B: The Best Of Herman's Hermits; US B: Herman's Hermits | A & UK B: Herman's Hermits On Tour; US B: Introducing Herman's Hermits |
| Mar. 1965 | "Mrs. Brown, You've Got a Lovely Daughter"; B-side: "I Gotta Dream On" (Not released as a single in the UK) | 1 | — | 10 | 1 | — | 1 | 4 | 1 | US: Gold | A: Herman's Hermits; B: Non-album track | A: Introducing Herman's Hermits; B: Herman's Hermits On Tour |
| Apr. 1965 | "Wonderful World"; UK B-side: "I Gotta Dream On"; NA B-side: "Traveling Light" | 4 | 7 | 3 | 1 | — | 5 | — | 18 | | A: The Best Of Herman's Hermits; UK B: Non-album track US B: Herman's Hermits | A: The Best Of Herman's Hermits; UK & US B: Herman's Hermits On Tour |
| June 1965 | "I'm Henry VIII, I Am"; B-side: "The End Of The World" (Not released as a single in the UK) | 1 | — | 2 | 4 | — | 15 | 3 | — | US: Gold | Herman's Hermits | Herman's Hermits On Tour |
| Aug. 1965 | "Just a Little Bit Better"; UK B-side: "Take Love, Give Love"; NA B-side: "Sea Cruise" | 7 | 15 | 11 | 2 | — | — | 7 | 40 | | A: The Best Of Herman's Hermits; UK B: Non-album track US B: The Most Of Herman's Hermits | A: The Best Of Herman's Hermits; UK B: Vol. 2: The Best Of Herman's Hermits; US B: Introducing Herman's Hermits |
| Dec. 1965 | "A Must to Avoid"; B-side: "The Man With The Cigar" | 8 | 6 | 1 | 3 | 5 | 14 | — | 4 | | A: The Best Of Herman's Hermits; B: Non-album track | A: Hold On! B: Both Sides Of Herman's Hermits |
| Feb. 1966 | "Listen People"; B-side: "Got A Feeling" (Not released as a single in the UK) | 3 | — | 7 | 1 | — | — | 7 | 3 | | A: Both Sides Of Herman's Hermits; B: Non-album track | A: Vol. 2: The Best Of Herman's Hermits; B: Hold On! |
| Mar. 1966 | "You Won't Be Leaving"; B-side: "Listen People" (Not released as a single in NA) | — | 20 | — | — | — | — | — | 9 (Note: Shared chart position with "Leaning on the Lamp Post") | | A: There's A Kind Of Hush; B: Both Sides Of Herman's Hermits | A: There's A Kind Of Hush; B: Vol. 2: The Best Of Herman's Hermits |
| Apr. 1966 | "Leaning on the Lamp Post"; B-side: "Hold On!" (Not released as a single in the UK) | 9 | — | 2 | 4 | — | — | — | 9 | | A: Both Sides Of Herman's Hermits; B: Non-album track | Hold On! |
| June 1966 | "This Door Swings Both Ways"; B-side: "For Love" | 12 | 18 | 8 | 3 | — | — | — | 38 | | A: The Best Of Herman's Hermits; B: Both Sides Of Herman's Hermits | Both Sides Of Herman's Hermits |
| Sept. 1966 | "Dandy"; B-side: "My Reservation's Been Confirmed" (Not released as a single in the UK) | 5 | — | 3 | 1 | — | — | — | 14 | | A: There's A Kind Of Hush; B: Both Sides Of Herman's Hermits | A: Vol. 2: The Best Of Herman's Hermits; B: Both Sides Of Herman's Hermits |
| Oct. 1966 | "No Milk Today"; B-side: "My Reservation's Been Confirmed" (Not released as a single in NA, charted in 1967 when released as b-side to "There's a Kind of Hush") | 35 | 7 | 2 | 2 | 1 | 2 | 3 | 1 | | A: There's A Kind Of Hush; B: Both Sides Of Herman's Hermits | A: There's A Kind Of Hush; B: Both Sides Of Herman's Hermits |
| 1966 | "Je Suis Anglais"; B-side: "Musique Instrumentale" (Canada-exclusive single) | — | — | — | — | — | — | — | — | | A: Both Sides Of Herman's Hermits; B: Non-album track | A: Both Sides Of Herman's Hermits; B: Non-album track |
| Dec. 1966 | "East West"; B-side: "What Is Wrong-What Is Right" | 27 | 33 | 5 | 9 | — | — | — | 33 | | A: There's A Kind Of Hush; B: Non-album track | A: There's A Kind Of Hush; B: The Best Of Herman's Hermits Vol. III |
| Feb. 1967 | "There's a Kind of Hush"; UK B-side: "Gaslight Street"; NA B-side: "No Milk Today" (see above for chart info.) | 4 | 7 | 10 | 2 | — | 9 | — | 5 | US: Gold | There's A Kind Of Hush | There's A Kind Of Hush |
| May 1967 | "Don't Go Out Into The Rain (You're Going To Melt)"; B-side: "Moonshine Man" (Not released as a single in the UK) | 18 | — | 13 | 15 | — | 15 | — | 39 | | Blaze | Blaze |
| Sept. 1967 | "Museum"; B-side: "Last Bus Home" | 39 | 52 (Note: Chart position is from the official UK "Breakers List".) | — | 19 | — | — | — | 39 (Note: Shared chart position with "Don't Go Out Into the Rain (You're Going to Melt)") | | Blaze | Blaze |
| Jan. 1968 | "I Can Take or Leave Your Loving"; B-side: "Marcel's" | 22 | 11 | 19 | 1 | — | — | — | 37 | | A: The Best Of Herman's Hermits; B: Non-album tracks | Non-album tracks |
| Mar. 1968 | "Sleepy Joe"; B-side: "Just One Girl" | 61 | 12 | 4 | 9 | 10 | 18 | 17 | 21 | | A: The Best Of Herman's Hermits; B: Non-album tracks | Non-album tracks |
| July 1968 | "Sunshine Girl"; B-side: "Nobody Needs To Know" | 101 | 8 | 9 | 68 | 6 | — | — | 56 | | A: The Best Of Herman's Hermits; B: Non-album tracks | Non-album tracks |
| Oct. 1968 | "The Most Beautiful Thing in My Life"; B-side: "Ooh, She's Done It Again" (NA release only) | 131 | — | — | 75 | — | — | — | 80 | | Mrs. Brown You've Got A Lovely Daughter | Mrs. Brown You've Got A Lovely Daughter |
| Dec. 1968 | "Something's Happening"; UK B-side: "The Most Beautiful Thing In My Life"; US B-side: "Little Miss Sorrow, Child Of Tomorrow" | 130 | 6 | 20 | 84 | 4 | 3 | — | 25 | | A: The Best Of Herman's Hermits; UK B:Mrs. Brown You've Got A Lovely Daughter; US B: Herman's Hermits (1968) | A: Non-album tracks UK B: Mrs. Brown You've Got A Lovely Daughter; US B: There's A Kind Of Hush |
| Apr. 1969 | "My Sentimental Friend"; B-side: "My Lady" | — | 2 | 6 | — | — | 1 | — | 3 | | A: 20 Greatest Hits; B: Non-album track | Non-album tracks |
| Nov. 1969 | "Here Comes the Star"; B-side: "It's Alright Now" | — | 33 | — | — | — | — | — | — | | A: The Most Of Herman's Hermits; B: Non-album tracks | Non-album tracks |
| 1969 | "Regardez-moi (Version Française de Here Comes the Star"; B-side: "It's Alright Now" (France-exclusive single) | — | — | — | — | — | — | — | — | | Non-album tracks | Non-album tracks |
| Feb. 1970 | "Years May Come, Years May Go"; B-side: "Smile Please" | — | 7 | — | — | — | 12 | — | 31 | | | Non-album tracks |
| May 1970 | "Bet Yer Life I Do"; B-side: "Searching For The Southern Sun" | — | 22 | — | — | — | — | — | — | | A: 20 Greatest Hits; B: Non-album track | Non-album tracks |
| Nov. 1970 | "Lady Barbara" (by Peter Noone & Herman's Hermits); B-side: "Don't Just Stand There" | — | 13 | 7 | — | — | — | — | — | | A: 20 Greatest Hits; B: Non-album track | Non-album tracks |
| 1971 | "She's a Lady (Say What You Want To Say)"; B-side: "Gold Mandela" (as Hermits) | — | — | — | — | — | — | — | — | | Non-album tracks | Non-album tracks |
| 1972 | "The Man"; B-side: "Effen Curly" (as Hermits) | — | — | — | — | — | — | — | — | | Non-album tracks | Non-album tracks |
| 1973 | "You Gotta Love Me Baby"; B-side: "Motorway City" (as John Gaughan with the Hermits) | — | — | — | — | — | — | — | — | | Non-album tracks | Non-album tracks |
| 1975 | "Ginny Go Softly"; B-side: "Blond Haired Blue Eyed Boy" | — | — | — | — | — | — | — | — | | Non-album tracks | Non-album tracks |
| 1976 | "I'm In A Lonely Situation (Love Is All I Need)"; B-side: "Blond Haired Blue Eyed Boy" (Not released as a single in the UK) | — | — | — | — | — | — | — | — | | Non-album tracks | Non-album tracks |
| 1976 | "Train"; B-side: "Ride on the Water" | — | — | — | — | — | — | — | — | | Non-album tracks | Non-album tracks |
| 1977 | "Heart Get Ready For Love"; B-side: "Truck Stop Momma" | — | — | — | — | — | — | — | — | | Non-album tracks | Non-album tracks |
| 2024 | "Only Last Night"; B-side: "Only Last Night (DJ Something Good Rework)" (as Herman and the Hermits) (10" single, archival) | — | — | — | — | — | — | — | — | | Non-album tracks | Non-album tracks |
"—" denotes a release that did not chart or was not issued in that country. "I Gotta Dream" - #28 Can.
