= Into Something Good: The Mickie Most Years 1964–72 =

2008 4-CD box set by Herman's Hermits

Compilation album by Herman's Hermits
- Released: 15 July 2008
- Label: EMI Music Publishing
- Producer: Mickie Most

Herman's Hermits chronology
The Very Best of Herman's Hermits (2084)	Into Something Good: The Mickie Most Years 1964–72 (2008)	The Best of Herman's Hermits: The 50th Anniversary Anthology (2015)

Into Something Good: The Mickie Most Years 1964–1972 is a 4-CD box set by British pop group Herman's Hermits, released in 2008 on EMI.

The box set contains a complete representation of all of the recordings Herman's Hermits recorded for official release from 1964 to 1972, plus previously unreleased material, rarities, and a few solo singles by lead singer Peter Noone, recorded on Mickie Most's RAK label after Noone left the band.

Most acted as producer during the entire length of the Hermits' eight-year career. Herman's Hermits charted in the U.S. and Britain fairly regularly because of their pop accessibility — a result of simple but very well-crafted arrangements. AllMusic reviewer Steve Leggett assesses the band's catalogue thus: "As one quickly discovers, the Hermits' work was an embarrassment of pop/rock riches second only to The Beatles in consistency, if not ambition."

== Track listing ==
All songs in mono, except where noted.

=== CD 1 ===
1. "Heartbeat" (Bob Montgomery, Norman Petty)
2. "Travelin' Light" (Roy C. Bennett, Sid Tepper)
3. "I'll Never Dance Again" (Mike Anthony, Barry Mann)
4. "Walkin' With My Angel" (Gerry Goffin, Carole King)
5. "(I Gotta) Dream On" (Gary Gordon)
6. "I Wonder" (Richard Pearson)
7. "For Your Love" (Graham Gouldman)
8. "Don't Try to Hurt Me" (Keith Hopwood)
9. "Tell Me Baby" (Hopwood, Derek Leckenby)
10. "I'm Henery the Eighth, I Am" (Fred Murray, R. P. Weston)
11. "The End of the World" (Arthur Kent, Sylvia Dee)
12. "Mrs. Brown, You've Got a Lovely Daughter" (Trevor Peacock)
13. "I'm into Something Good" (Goffin, C. King)
14. "Your Hand in Mine" (Harvey Lisberg, Charles Silverman)
15. "Show Me Girl" (Goffin, C. King)
16. I Know Why" (Leckenby, Silverman)
17. "Silhouettes" (Bob Crewe, Frank Slay Jr.)
18. "Can't You Hear My Heartbeat" (John Carter, Ken Lewis)
19. "Wonderful World" (Lou Adler, Herb Alpert, Sam Cooke)
20. "Just a Little Bit Better" (Kenny Young)
21. "Take Love, Give Love" (Peter Noone)
22. "A Must to Avoid" (Steve Barri, P.F. Sloan)
23. "The Man With the Cigar" (Larry Kusik, Barry Richards)
24. "Sea Cruise" (Huey "Piano" Smith)
25. "Mother-in-Law" (Allen Toussaint)
26. "I Understand (Just How You Feel)" (Pat Best)
27. "Thinkin' of You" (Pearson, John Wright)
28. "Little Boy Sad" (Wayne Walker)
29. "Story of My Life" (Burt Bacharach, Hal David)
30. "My Reservation's Been Confirmed" (Hopwood, Leckenby, Lisberg)
31. "Bus Stop" (Gouldman)
32. "For Love" (Hopwood, Leckenby, Lisberg)

=== CD 2 ===
1. "Where Were You When I Needed You?" (Barri, Sloan)
2. "All the Things I Do for You Baby" (Barri, Sloan)
3. "Leaning on a Lamp-post" (Noel Gay) [album version]
4. "Dial My Number" (Lester Vandyke)
5. "Oo-ee Baby" (Larry Dexter, D.C. Mullins)
6. "Je suis anglais (L'autre jour)" (Ralph Bernet, Gilles Jérome)
7. "Listen People" (Gouldman)
8. "You Won't Be Leaving" (Tony Hazzard)
9. "This Door Swings Both Ways" (Don Thomas, Estelle Levitt)
10. "Hold On!" (Barri, Sloan) [album version]
11. "The George and the Dragon" (Fred Karger, Sid Wayne, Ben Weisman)
12. "Wild Love" (Karger, Wayne, Weisman)
13. "What Is Wrong, What Is Right" (Hopwood, Leckenby, Lisberg)
14. "Bidin' My Time" (George Gershwin, Ira Gershwin)
15. "Got a Feeling" (Karger, Wayne, Weisman)
16. "Kansas City Loving" (Jerry Leiber, Mike Stoller)
17. "Gotta Get Away" (Karger, Wayne, Weisman) [stereo]
18. "Make Me Happy" (Karger, Wayne, Weisman) [stereo] (vocals by Shelley Fabares)
19. "There's a Kind of Hush" (Les Reed, Geoff Stephens)
20. "Saturday's Child" (David Gates)
21. "If You're Thinkin' What I'm Thinkin'" (Tommy Boyce, Bobby Hart)
22. "You Won't Be Leaving" (Hazzard)
23. "Dandy" (Ray Davies)
24. "Jezebel" (Wayne Shanklin)
25. "No Milk Today" (Gouldman)
26. "Little Miss Sorrow, Child of Tomorrow" (Bruce Woodley)
27. "Gaslite Street" (Hopwood, Leckenby)
28. "Rattler" (Woodley)
29. "East West" (Gouldman)
30. "The Future Mrs 'Awkins" (Albert Chevalier)
31. "Oh! Mr. Porter" (George Le Brunn, Thomas Le Brunn)
32. "Two Lovely Black Eyes" (Charles Coborn)
33. "My Old Dutch" (Chevalier, Charles Ingle)

=== CD 3 ===
1. "I Can Take or Leave Your Loving" (Rick Jones)
2. "Marcel's" (Gouldman, Hopwood, Lisberg, P. Noone)
3. "It's Nice to Be Out in the Morning" (Gouldman) [stereo]
4. "Holiday Inn" (Stephens) [stereo]
5. "Ooh, She's Done It Again" (Gouldman) [stereo]
6. "Lemon and Lime" (Gouldman) [stereo] [vocals by Stanley Holloway and Herman's Hermits]
7. "The Most Beautiful Thing in My Life" (K. Young) [stereo]
8. "Daisy Chain, Part 1" (Hopwood, Leckenby) [stereo]
9. "Daisy Chain, Part 2" (Hopwood, Leckenby) [stereo]
10. "The World Is for the Young" (Gouldman) [stereo] [vocals by Marjorie Rhodes, Sheila White, Stanley Holloway, and Mona Washbourne]
11. "London Look" (Gouldman)
12. "Museum" (Donovan Leitch) [stereo]
13. "Upstairs, Downstairs" (Gouldman) [stereo]
14. "Busy Line" (Karl Green, Hopwood, Leckenby) [stereo]
15. "Moonshine Man" (Green, Hopwood, Leckenby)
16. "Green Street Green" (Stephens) [stereo]
17. "Don't Go Out into the Rain (You're Going to Melt)" (K. Young) [stereo]
18. "I Call Out Her Name" (Green, Hopwood, Leckenby)
19. "One Little Packet Of Cigarettes" (Carter, Stephens) [stereo]
20. "Last Bus Home" (Peter Cowap) [stereo]
21. "Ace, King, Queen, Jack" (Cowap, P. Noone) [stereo]
22. "Sleepy Joe" (Russell Alquist, Carter)
23. "Just One Girl" (John Paul Jones, Adrian Love)
24. "Sunshine Girl" (Carter, Stephens)
25. "Nobody Needs to Know" (Roger Brook, Hopwood, Leckenby)
26. "Something's Happening" (Giancarlo Bigazzi, Riccardo Del Turco, Jack Fishman)
27. "My Sentimental Friend" (Carter, Stephens)
28. "My Lady" (David Most, P. Noone)
29. "Here Comes the Star" (Johnny Young)
30. "It's Alright Now" (Gouldman, Most, P. Noone)
31. "Years May Come, Years May Go" (Fishman, Jean-Claude Massoulier, André Popp)

=== CD 4 ===
1. "Smile Please" (Anthony King, Most, P. Noone)
2. "Bet Yer Life I Do" (Green, Hopwood, Leckenby)
3. "Searching for the Southern Sun" (Errol Brown, Tony Wilson)
4. "Lady Barbara" (Bigazzi, Brown, Gaetano Savio, Wilson) [stereo]
5. "Don't Just Stand There" (A. King, Most, P. Noone, Harold Spiro) [stereo]
6. "Mum and Dad" (Peter Callander, Mitch Murray) [stereo]
7. "Moonshine Man" (Green, Hopwood, Leckenby) [stereo]
8. "My Old Dutch" (Chevalier, Charles Ingle) / "Show Me the Way to Go Home" (James Campbell, Reginald Connelly) [unedited version, previously unreleased]
9. "Wings of Love" (Patrick Campbell-Lyons, Alex Spyropoulos)
10. "Big Man" (Bruce Belland, Glen Larson)
11. "Wait for Me, Here I Come" (Hopwood, P. Noone) [previously unreleased]
12. "Regardez-moi (Here Comes the Star)" (Mireille Noone, J. Young)
13. "A Year Ago Today" (Carter, Stephens) [previously unreleased]
14. "The Colder It Gets" (Raymond Bloodworth, L. Russell Brown) [previously unreleased]
15. "Big Ship" (Raymond Froggatt) [stereo, previously unreleased]
16. "Oh, You Pretty Things" (David Bowie) [Peter Noone solo recording]
17. "Together Forever" (Fishman, Daniel Vangarde) [Peter Noone solo recording]
18. "Right On Mother" (Bowie) [stereo, Peter Noone solo recording]
19. "Walnut Whirl" (Herbie Flowers, Sandie Tatham-Banks) [stereo] [Peter Noone solo recording]
20. "Shoo-Be-Doo-Ah" (Mike Chapman, Nicky Chinn) [stereo] [Peter Noone solo recording]
21. "Because You're There" (Gouldman, Noone) [stereo] [Peter Noone solo recording]
22. "Should I (Have Loved You)" (Angelo Finaldi, Richard Tate) [stereo] [Peter Noone solo recording]
23. "Each and Every Minute" (John Rostill) [Peter Noone solo recording]
24. "Green Green Rocky Road" (Traditional, arranged by Arlo Guthrie) [Peter Noone solo recording, previously unreleased]
25. "I Do Believe (In Music)" (Finaldi, Tate) [stereo] [Peter Noone solo recording, previously unreleased]

== Notes ==
- Tracks 1-1 to 1-12 from the album Herman's Hermits (EMI Columbia 33SX 1727 – 1965)
- Tracks 1-13 and 1-14 from the UK single (Columbia DB 7338 – 1964)
- Tracks 1-15 and 1-16 from the UK single (Columbia DB 7408 – 1964)
- Tracks 1-17 and 1-18 from the UK single (Columbia DB 7475 – 1965)
- Track 1-19 from the UK single (Columbia DB 7546 – 1965)
- Tracks 1-20 and 1-21 from the UK single (Columbia DB 7670 – 1965)
- Tracks 1-22 and 1-23 from the UK single (Columbia DB 7791 – 1965)
- Tracks 1-24 to 1-27 from the EP Hermania (SEG 8380 – 1965)
- Tracks 1-28 to 2-7 from the album Both Sides of Herman's Hermits (EMI Columbia SX 6084 – 1966)
- Track 2-8 and 2-9 from the UK single (Columbia DB 7861 – 1966)
- Tracks 2-10 to 2-12, 2-17 and 2-18 from the EP Hold On! (SEG 8503 – 1966)
- Track 2-13 from the UK single (Columbia DB 8076 – 1966)
- Track 2-14 from the When the Boys Meet the Girls soundtrack (MGM C8006 – 1966)
- Track 2-15 from the US single (MGM K113462 – 1966)
- Track 2-16 from the album Introducing Herman's Hermits (MGM E4282 – 1965)
- Tracks 2-19 to 2-29 from the album There's a Kind of Hush All Over the World (EMI Columbia SCX 6174 – 1967)
- Tracks 2-30 to 2-33 from the US album Both Sides of Herman's Hermits (MGM SE 4386 – 1966)
- Tracks 3-1 and 3-2 from the UK single (Columbia DB 8327 – 1968)
- Tracks 3-3 to 3-10 from the Mrs. Brown, You've Got a Lovely Daughter soundtrack (EMI Columbia SCX 6303 – 1968)
- Track 3-11 from the Yardley promotional EP London Look (SLE 15 – 1968)
- Tracks 3-12 to 3-21 from the US album Blaze (MGM SE 4478 – 1967)
- Tracks 3-22 and 3-23 from the UK single (Columbia DB 8404 – 1968)
- Tracks 3-24 and 3-25 from the UK single (Columbia DB 8446 – 1968)
- Track 3-26 from the UK single (Columbia DB 8504 – 1968)
- Tracks 3-27 and 3-28 from the UK single (Columbia DB 8563 – 1969)
- Tracks 3-29 and 3-30 from the UK single (Columbia DB 8626 – 1969)
- Tracks 3-31 and 4-1 from the UK single (Columbia DB 8656 – 1970)
- Tracks 4-2 and 4-3 from the UK single (RAK 102 – 1970)
- Tracks 4-4 and 4-5 from the UK single (RAK 106 – 1970); credited to Peter Noone & Herman's Hermits
- Tracks 4-6 and 4-7 previously unreleased stereo versions
- Track 4-8 is the original full recording
- Track 4-9 was an unissued single; it appeared on The Best of Herman's Hermits (Vol. 3)
- Tracks 4-10, 4-11, 4-13 to 4-15, 4-24 and 4-25 are previously unreleased tracks
- Track 4-12 was a French single
- Tracks 4-16 to 4-25 are Peter Noone solo recordings
- Tracks 4-24 and 4-25 would have been Noone's fifth RAK single (RAK 147), recorded 12 April 1972
