= The Best of Herman's Hermits: The 50th Anniversary Anthology =

Greatest hits album by Herman's Hermits
- Released: 2015
- Label: Bear Family
- Producer: Ron Furmanek

Herman's Hermits chronology
The Very Best of Herman's Hermits (2012)	The Best of Herman's Hermits: The 50th Anniversary Anthology (2015)

The Best of Herman's Hermits: The 50th Anniversary Anthology is a 2-CD set by British group Herman's Hermits, released in 2015 on Bear Family Records. The set was produced and compiled by Grammy-nominated producer Ron Furmanek and includes the band's greatest hits along with demos, stereo mixes and session outtakes.

== Reception ==
Professional ratings
Review scores
Source	Rating
AllMusic	4.5/5 stars

In Stephen Thomas Erlewine's review of the album for AllMusic, he believes the anthology is "a little light, particularly on the earliest recordings" but that this two-disc set is smartly assembled, so it gains momentum as it proceeds headlong through its 66 tracks." Although not sequenced chronologically, Erlewine says that is a benefit because it ends giving emphasis to both the early and later parts of the band's career on each disc. "Like no other compilation in their catalog, [it] makes a convincing case for the quintet as pleasing purveyors of pure pop".

== Track listing ==
=== Disc 1 ===
1. "Only Last Night" (Demo) (Silverman*, Lisberg) - 2:18
2. "I'm into Something Good" (Carole King - Gerry Goffin) - 2:39
3. "Mrs. Brown, You've Got a Lovely Daughter" (Trevor Peacock) Arranged by – John Paul Jones - 2:56
4. "Kansas City Loving" (Leiber - Stoller) - 2:05
5. "Sea Cruise" (Huey Smith) - 2:08
6. "Walkin' with My Angel" (Gerry Goffin - Carole King) - 2:20
7. "Show Me Girl" (Gerry Goffin - Carole King) - 2:34
8. "I Understand (Just How You Feel)" (Pat Best) - 3:03
9. "Mother-in-Law" (Alan Toussaint) - 2:31
10. "Your Hand in Mine" (Charlie Silverman, Harvey Lisberg) - 2:03
11. "Thinkin' of You" (Pearson, John Wright [Uncredited]) - 2:04
12. "Wonderful World" (Campbell, H. Alpert*, L. Adler, S. Cooke) - 1:58
13. "Just a Little Bit Better" (Kenny Young) - 2:53
14. "Hold On! (Single Version)" (Phil Sloan, Steve Barri) - 2:00
15. "Leaning on the Lamp Post (Single Version)" (Noel Gay) - 2:43
16. "A Must to Avoid" (Phil Sloan, Steve Barri) - 1:59
17. "My Reservation's Been Confirmed" (Silverman, D. Leckenby, K. Hopwood) - 2:52
18. "The Story of My Life" (Burt Bacharach - Hal David) - 2:29
19. "There's a Kind of Hush" (Geoff Stephens, Les Reed) - 2:33
20. "Saturday's Child" (Gates) - 2:40
21. "If You're Thinkin' What I'm Thinkin'" (Boyce - Hart) - 2:24
22. "You Won't Be Leaving" (Tony Hazzard) - 2:39
23. "Dandy" (Ray Davies) - 2:29
24. "Jezebel" (Charles Aznavour, Wayne Shanklin) - 3:21
25. "No Milk Today" (Graham Gouldman) - 3:29
26. "Little Miss Sorrow, Child of Tomorrow" (B. Woodley) - 2:34
27. "Gaslite Street" (Derek Leckenby, Keith Hopwood) - 2:38
28. "Rattler" (Bruce Woodley) - 3:13
29. "East West" (Graham Gouldman) - 2:08
30. "What Is Wrong - What Is Right" (Leckenby, Harvey Lisberg, Hopwood) - 2:32
31. "Mum & Dad" (Peter Callender - Mitch Murray) - 2:14
32. "My Sentimental Friend" (Geoff Stephens, John Carter) - 3:53
33. "Years May Come, Years May Go" (Pop, Jack Fishman) - 3:42

=== Disc 2 ===
1. "Thinkin' of You" (Demo) (Pearson, Wright [Uncredited]) - 2:05
2. "Can't You Hear My Heartbeat" (Ken Lewis - John Carter) - 2:16
3. "I'm Henry VIII, I Am" (Murray, Weston) - 1:49
4. "The End of the World" (Arthur Kent, Sylvia Dee) - 2:58
5. "For Your Love" (Graham Gouldman) - 2:25
6. "I Gotta Dream On" (G. Gordon) - 2:13
7. "Don't Try to Hurt Me" (Keith Hopwood) - 2:05
8. "Silhouettes" (Bob Crewe, Frank Slay) - 2:19
9. "I'll Never Dance Again" (Mann, Anthony) - 3:28
10. "Tell Me Baby" (Leckenby, Keith Hopwood) - 2:14
11. "Listen People (Single Version)" (Graham Gouldman) - 2:29
12. "Bus Stop" (Graham Gouldman) - 2:29
13. "Little Boy Sad" (Wayne Walker) - 2:24
14. "This Door Swings Both Ways" (Don Thomas, Estelle Levitt) - 2:06
15. "Museum" (Donovan Leitch) - 2:51
16. "Upstairs Downstairs" (Graham Gouldman) - 2:08
17. "Busy Line" (Leckenby, Lisberg, Green, Hopwood) - 2:28
18. "Moonshine Man" (Leckenby, Lisberg, Green, Hopwood) - 2:33
19. "Green Street Green" (Geoff Stephens) - 2:11
20. "Don't Go Out into the Rain (You're Going to Melt)" (Kenny Young) - 2:13
21. "I Call Out Her Name" (Leckenby, Hopwood) - 1:51
22. "The London Look" (Graham Gouldman) - 2:05
23. "The Colder It Gets" (L. Russell Brown [Uncredited], Raymond Bloodworth) - 2:26
24. "A Year Ago Today" (Stephens, Carter) - 2:42
25. "I Can Take or Leave Your Loving (Alternate Spoken Ending)" (Tony MacAuley - John MacLeod) - 2:40
26. "Sleepy Joe" (Carter*, Alquist) - 3:17
27. "Just One Girl" (Adrian Love, John Paul Jones) - 2:46
28. "Sunshine Girl" (Geoff Stephens, John Carter) - 2:36
29. "Something's Happening" (Bigazzi, Fishman, Del Turco) - 3:16
30. "Here Comes the Star" (Johnny Young) - 3:32
31. "It's Alright Now" (David Most, Hillary, Peter Noone) - 2:41
32. "Smile Please" (A. King, D. Most, Peter Noone) - 2:41
33. "Bet Yer Life I Do" (Undubbed Mix) (Errol Brown, T. Wilson) - 2:47

== Credits ==
- Artwork – Mychael Gerstenberger
- Engineer [Original] – Dave Siddle (tracks: 1-1 to 1-15, 1-17 to 1-32, 2-1 to 2-29), Dick Bogert (tracks: 1-16), Martin Birch (tracks: 1-33, 2-30 to 2-33)
- Engineer [Remix] – Mike Jarratt
- Mastered by Mark Mathews
- Photography by [Picture Restoration] – Sam Malbuch
- Producer [Original] – Mickie Most (tracks: 1-2 to 1-33, 2-2 to 2-33), Ron Richards (tracks: 1-1, 2-1)
- Reissue producer, compiled by – Ron Furmanek
- Remix – Ron Furmanek
- Special audio help

== Notes ==
All songs remixed from the original 2-, 3-, 4-, and 8-track master tapes. All songs are first time stereo except tracks 1-16, 1-19, 1-31, 2-15 to 2-17, 2-19 and 2-20

Songwriting credit for track 2-23 listed as unknown Songwriting credit for track 2-30 mistakenly given to Kenny Young and Mireille Noone Songwriting credit for track 2-31 mistakenly given to Mickie Most
