= A Kind of Hush =

A Kind of Hush may refer to:

- A Kind of Hush (album), a 1976 album release by the Carpenters
- A Kind of Hush (novel), a 1999 autobiographical novel by Richard Johnson
  - A Kind of Hush (film), a 1999 film based on the above novel
- "There's a Kind of Hush", a Les Reed/Geoff Stephens composition which was a hit for Herman's Hermits in 1967 and for the Carpenters in 1976
- There's a Kind of Hush All Over the World, a 1967 album by the Herman's Hermits
