= Happening (TV series) =

Australian music television show (1970–1972)

Happening is an ATV-0 music television program that ran for four hours on a Saturday morning. It ran from 1970-72. The series played video clips, had live performers and showed interviews and discussions.

The first season was titled Happening '70 and was hosted by Ross D. Wyllie. It began on 14 March 1970 after an injunction preventing its broadcast was lifted. The producers of the series Uptight had argued it was too similar to their own production, having the same host, format and timeslot. It continued the next year as Happening '71 during which Jeff Phillips took over as host. Again renamed, Happening '72 saw Phillips continue as Host with Johnny Young filling in for a month in the middle of the year. The series final episode aired on 11 November 1972.
