= Both Sides of Herman's Hermits =

Studio album by Herman's Hermits
- Released: August 1966 (US); October 1966 (UK)
- Recorded: 21 March, 30 April and 21 May 1966
- Genres: Pop rock; beat
- Length: 29:52 on original UK release
- Labels: MGM (US/Canada); Columbia (UK)
- Producer: Mickie Most

Herman's Hermits British chronology
Hold On! (1966)	Both Sides of Herman's Hermits (1966)	Dandy (1967)

Herman's Hermits American chronology
Hold On! (1966)	Both Sides of Herman's Hermits (1966)	There's a Kind of Hush All Over the World (1967)

Professional ratings
Review scores
Source	Rating
AllMusic	3/5 stars

Both Sides of Herman's Hermits is the second UK album and fourth US album by the pop rock group Herman's Hermits. It was released in August 1966 in the US and October 1966 in the UK. The original U.S. cover artwork was by Frank Frazetta.

The UK and U.S. versions differ drastically with different artwork and track listing: only five tracks featured on both versions. The UK version was re-released on CD in 2000 by Repertoire with bonus tracks that mostly combine the two albums. The artwork pictured is the US release.

== Track listing ==
=== UK version ===
Side one
No.	Title	Writer(s)	Length
1.	"Little Boy Sad"	Wayne Walker	2:25
2.	"Story of My Life"	Burt Bacharach, Hal David	2:30
3.	"My Reservation's Been Confirmed"	Keith Hopwood, Derek Leckenby, Harvey Lisberg	2:48
4.	"Bus Stop"	Graham Gouldman	2:27
5.	"For Love"	Hopwood, Leckenby, Lisberg	2:50
6.	"Where Were You When I Needed You?"	Steve Barri, P. F. Sloan	2:46

Side two
No.	Title	Writer(s)	Length
1.	"All the Things I Do for You Baby"	Barri, Sloan	2:20
2.	"Leaning on a Lamp Post"	Noel Gay	2:31
3.	"Dial My Number"	Lester Vandyke	1:56
4.	"Oo-ee Baby"	Larry Dexter, D.C. Mullins	2:13
5.	"Je suis anglais (L'autre jour)"	Ralph Bernet, Gilles Jérome	2:37
6.	"Listen People"	Gouldman	2:29

Bonus Tracks (2000 Repertoire Re-release)

13. "Kansas City Loving" (Jerry Leiber, Mike Stoller)
14. "A Must to Avoid" (Barri, Sloan)
15. "The Man With the Cigar" (Larry Kusik, Barry Richards)
16. "Got a Feeling" (Fred Karger, Sid Wayne, Ben Weisman)
17. "Hold On!" (Barri, Sloan)
18. "Oh! Mr. Porter" (George Le Brunn, Thomas Le Brunn)
19. "The Future Mrs. 'Awkins" (Albert Chevalier)
20. "Two Lovely Black Eyes" (Charles Coborn)
21. "My Old Dutch" (Chevalier, Charles Ingle)

=== US version ===
Side 1

1. "This Door Swings Both Ways" (Don Thomas, Estelle Levitt)
2. "Bus Stop" (Graham Gouldman)
3. "For Love" (Keith Hopwood, Derek Leckenby, Harvey Lisberg)
4. "Je suis anglais (L'autre jour)" (Ralph Bernet, Gilles Jérome)
5. "Dial My Number" (Lester Van Dyke)

Side 2

1. "The Future Mrs. 'Awkins" (Albert Chevalier)
2. "Oh! Mr. Porter" (George Le Brunn, Thomas Le Brunn)
3. "The Man With the Cigar" (Barry Richards, Larry Kusik)
4. "Two Lovely Black Eyes" (Charles Coborn)
5. "My Reservation's Been Confirmed" (Hopwood, Leckenby, Lisberg)
6. "My Old Dutch" (Chevalier, Charles Ingle)

Note: The traditional songs "The Future Mrs. 'Awkins", "Oh! Mr. Porter", "Two Lovely Black Eyes", and "My Old Dutch" were all originally erroneously credited to Kenny Lynch, whose arrangements Herman's Hermits covered.

== Charts ==
Chart performance for Both Sides of Herman's Hermits
Chart (1966-1967)	Peak position
US Billboard Top LPs	48
US Cashbox Album Charts	35
