= John Gaughan (singer) =

John Gaughan (born 1953) was an English musician.

== Career ==
Gaughan was born in Leeds. He briefly worked as a trainee engineer, before becoming a jukebox mechanic. Gaughan said he "had had quite a bit of experience playing with local groups, and doing straight pop numbers".

In 1972, Gaughan performed "two of [his] own songs" for record producer Roger Cook, who was holding auditions. Gaughan's friend had urged him to enter the competition. Cook saw potential in Gaughan and placed Gaughan with Herman's Hermits, then called the Hermits. Gaughan made his first appearance with the group at a concert in Ireland, and toured with the group for a year. In late 1973, Gaughan released his first single, "You Gotta Love Me, Baby" on CBS Records. The single was credited to John Gaughan with the Hermits, and produced by Cook and Roger Greenaway. By 1974, Gaughan had left the Hermits and was performing with his own group. After DJs struggled to pronounce his surname, Gaughan adopted the stage name Bobby Moonshine and released his second single "School Fool" later that year. Moonshine also recorded "Hands Up for Love" for release as a planned single.

Gaughan's alcohol habit began to affect his music career. In 2011, he recalled, "My life had really changed, but the only thing that remained constant was that I was an alcoholic. I had the money, and most of the time, the alcohol was free". He gave up his career after several years.

In 1994, Gaughan formed Zoe International Outreach, described as an "inter-denominational" organisation, with Colin and Judith Henley. Gaughan began delivering testimonials and performing concerts across England. He released the album You've Got to Be Crazy Not to Love Him on cassette. He also recorded the album Narrow Way.

== Personal life ==
Gaughan began drinking at the age of 13. By age 19, he was drinking "a bottle and a half of vodka a day". After repeatedly attempting to control his alcoholism, Gaughan attempted suicide at age 26 by jumping from an attic window. He landed feet first and survived the fall, severely damaging his legs and feet. Gaughan returned to drinking, after his mother died when he was in the hospital, and his house was burgled. He began attending church in 1986, but struggled to control his alcoholism until 1991, when "what they had been saying to me finally sank in and I cried out to the Lord — someone prayed for me and I have never wanted a drink since".

Gaughan lived in Spain for a period. By 1997, he was no longer living in Leeds and resided in Sunderland. He was divorced twice.

== Discography ==
Albums

- You've Got to Be Crazy Not to Love Him (1994)
- Narrow Way (1996)

Singles

- "You Gotta Love Me Baby" (1973) (as John Gaughan with the Hermits)
- "School Fool" (1974) (as Bobby Moonshine)
