= The Star (Ross D. Wyllie song) =

1969 song by Ross D. Wyllie

Song by Ross D. Wyllie
- B-side: "Do the Uptight"
- Released: September 1969
- Recorded: 1969
- Studio: ATV-0, Melbourne
- Genre: Pop
- Length: 3:29
- Label: Festival
- Songwriter: Johnny Young
- Producer: Bob Foster

Ross D. Wyllie singles chronology
| "Funny Man" (1969) | "The Star" (1969) | "My Little Girl" (1970) |

"The Star" or "(Here Comes) The Star" is a single by Australian pop music singer Ross D. Wyllie, released in September 1969. Written by Johnny Young and produced by Bob Foster for Festival. It reached number one on the Go-Set National Top 40. It was covered by the British pop group Herman's Hermits as "Here Comes the Star" in November and reached No. 33 on the UK singles chart.

== Background ==
"The Star" was released by Ross D. Wyllie in September 1969. Wyllie was the presenter of pop music TV show, Uptight, since October 1967, which was broadcast on ATV-0, Melbourne. He had issued singles both as a solo artist and as front man for the Uptight Party Team. He had a No. 17 hit on Go-Set's National Top 40 in July 1969, with his cover of Ray Stevens' 1963 song, "Funny Man". His next single, "The Star", is written by singer-songwriter Johnny Young, who was associated with Uptight. Young had previously written two number-one hits, "The Real Thing" and "The Girl That I Love" (both 1969), for another singer, Russell Morris.

Wyllie's version of "The Star" was arranged by John Farrar and produced by Bob Foster for Festival – the latter also produced Uptight. "The Star" peaked at number one on the Go-Set National Top 40. It was also released in the United States in November 1969. At the 1969 King of Pop Awards, which were presented during an Uptight episode in that month, Wyllie was a contender for King of Pop alongside Morris but both lost out to Johnny Farnham. Australian musician and music critic Robert Forster, praised three of the best late 1960s pop stars "Pop singing is an art... it was cathedral-sized: listen to Normie Rowe sing 'It's Not Easy', or [Wyllie] 'The Star', or Colleen Hewett 'Superstar'".

Wyllie was presented with a gold record, in 2003, for shipment of 35000 units of "(Here Comes) The Star". When the song's writer, Young, was inducted into the ARIA Hall of Fame in 2010, by his former Young Talent Time castmate, Tina Arena, she performed a rendition of "The Star".

== Track listing ==
7" Single

Ross D. Wyllie (September 1969) – Festival (FK-3255)

- "The Star" (Johnny Young) - 3:29
- "Do the Uptight" (Young) - 3:13

== Charts ==
| Chart (1969) | Position |
|---|---|
| Australian Go-Set Chart | 1 |

== Herman's Hermits version ==
"Here Comes the Star"

Song by Herman's Hermits

from the album The Most of Herman's Hermits
- B-side: "It's Alright Now"
- Released: November 1969
- Recorded: 1969
- Genre: Orchestral pop
- Length: 3:23
- Label: Columbia
- Songwriter: John B. Young

Herman's Hermits singles chronology
| "My Sentimental Friend" (1969) | "Here Comes the Star" (1969) | "Years May Come, Years May Go" (1970) |

British pop group, Herman's Hermits, had formed in Manchester in 1964 and provided their cover version of "The Star" as "Here Comes the Star", in November 1969, which reached No. 33 on the UK singles chart. The line-up of the group in 1969 comprised Peter Noone on lead vocals, Keith Hopwood on rhythm guitar and vocals, Karl Green on bass guitar and vocals, Derek Leckenby on lead guitar and Barry Whitwam on drums. Their previous single, "My Sentimental Friend" (April 1969) had reached No. 2 in the UK, No.3 in Australia and No.6 in New Zealand.

=== Track listing ===
7" Single

Herman's Hermits (November 1969) – Columbia

- "Here Comes the Star" (Johnny Young) - 3:23
- "It's Alright Now" (D Hayes, G Hilary, P Noone, H Gottlieb) - 2:23

=== Charts ===
| Chart (1969) | Position |
|---|---|
| UK Singles Chart | 33 |
