= There's a Kind of Hush All Over the World =

1967 studio album by Herman's Hermits

Studio album by Herman's Hermits
- Released: March 1967 (US); May 1967 (UK)
- Recorded: 21 March, 13 August, and 7 December 1966
- Studio: De Lane Lea Studios, London
- Genre: Pop, pop rock
- Length: 28:41 on original release
- Label: MGM (US); Columbia (UK)
- Producer: Mickie Most

Herman's Hermits British chronology
Both Sides of Herman's Hermits (1966)	There's a Kind of Hush All Over the World (1967)	Mrs. Brown, You've Got a Lovely Daughter (1968)

Herman's Hermits American chronology
Both Sides of Herman's Hermits (1966)	There's a Kind of Hush All Over the World (1967)	Blaze (1967)

Professional ratings
Review scores
Source	Rating
AllMusic	3/5 stars

There's a Kind of Hush All Over the World is the fifth US and third UK album by the English pop rock group Herman's Hermits. It was released by MGM Records in March 1967. In the UK, Columbia released the album in May 1967.

The album was not released in true stereo until Bear Family Records issued a 2 CD "50th Anniversary Collection" in 2015. On 13 June 1969, the album was certified Gold by the RIAA.

== Critical reception ==
Billboard described the album as "highly commercial" and predicted it would top the LP charts.

Bruce Eder of AllMusic gave the album a positive review, highlighting the group's cover of "Jezebel" in particular.

== Track listing ==
Side one
No.	Title	Writer(s)	Length
1.	"There's a Kind of Hush All Over the World"	Les Reed, Geoff Stephens	2:35
2.	"Saturday's Child"	David Gates	2:38
3.	"If You're Thinkin' What I'm Thinkin'"	Tommy Boyce, Bobby Hart	2:27
4.	"You Won't Be Leaving"	Tony Hazzard	2:22
5.	"Dandy"	Ray Davies	2:03
6.	"Jezebel"	Wayne Shanklin	3:23

Side two
No.	Title	Writer(s)	Length
1.	"No Milk Today"	Graham Gouldman	2:58
2.	"Little Miss Sorrow, Child of Tomorrow"	Bruce Woodley	2:34
3.	"Gaslight Street"	Keith Hopwood, Derek Leckenby	2:30
4.	"Rattler"	Woodley	3:15
5.	"East West"	Gouldman	2:00

=== 2001 Repertoire CD track listing ===
1. "There's a Kind of Hush (All Over the World)"
2. "East West"
3. "You Won't Be Leaving"
4. "Saturday's Child"
5. "If You're Thinkin' What I'm Thinkin'"
6. "No Milk Today"
7. "Little Miss Sorrow, Child of Tomorrow"
8. "Gaslight Street"
9. "Rattler"
10. "Dandy"
11. "Jezebel"

Bonus Tracks

12. "This Door Swings Both Ways" (Estelle Levitt, Don Thomas)
13. "What Is Wrong, What Is Right" (Hopwood, Leckenby, Lisberg)
14. "I Can Take or Leave Your Loving" (Rick Jones)
15. "Marcel's" (Gouldman, Hopwood, Lisberg, Peter Noone)
16. "(I Gotta) Dream On" (Gary Gordon)
17. "Don't Try to Hurt Me" (Hopwood)
18. "Biding My Time" (George Gershwin, Ira Gershwin)
19. "The George and the Dragon" (Fred Karger, Sid Wayne, Ben Weisman)
20. "Wild Love" (Karger, Wayne, Weisman)
21. "Gotta Get Away" (Karger, Wayne, Weisman)
22. "Make Me Happy" (Karger, Wayne, Weisman)

== Charts ==
Chart performance for There's A Kind Of Hush All Over The World
Chart (1967)	Peak position
Canadian RPM 25 Top LPs	6
US Billboard Top LPs	13
US Cashbox Album Charts	9
