= Ross D. Wyllie =

Australian singer (born 1944)

- Born: Ross David Wyllie; 21 November 1944 (age 82); Brisbane, Queensland, Australia
- Genre: Pop
- Occupations: Singer; television presenter; producer; public relations officer
- Instrument: Vocals
- Years active: 1964–2020
- Labels: Sunshine; Festival; Fable
- Formerly of: The Kodiaks

Ross David Wyllie (born 21 November 1944), generally known as Ross D. Wyllie, is a retired Australian pop music singer, television presenter and producer, most active in the 1960s and 1970s. Wyllie had a top 20 hit with his cover of Ray Stevens' song "Funny Man" and an Australian No. 1 with "The Star", both in 1969.

Wyllie hosted, Uptight, a weekly four-hour music series, on Channel 0 in Melbourne from 1967 to 1969. In 1970 he followed with a similar show, Happening '70, and from 1978 to 1980, he presented films on a late-night time slot.

== Biography ==
Ross David Wyllie was born in Ashgrove, Queensland on 21 November 1944, to Harold John Wyllie (1913–1965), an army sergeant serving during World War II, and Jean née Jennings (c. 1920–2002). He was raised in Brisbane with two siblings. As a child he contracted poliomyelitis and for most of his adult life he had a limp. In 1964 he joined a pop band, the Kodiaks, as lead singer. By 1967, as a solo artist, he signed with the Ivan Dayman's label, Sunshine Records, and released his debut single, "Short Skirts". He was backed by label-mates, the Escorts. His next single, "A Bit of Love", followed later that year, using only studio musicians.

Wyllie relocated to Melbourne and, on 28 October 1967, became the host of a new pop music TV show, Uptight, for local Channel 0. He signed with Festival Records and released a non-charting single, "Smile", in April 1968. Uptight ran as a Saturday morning three-hour show until 1969. By that time it was being produced by Bob Fraser and the presenter's wife, Eileen Wyllie, for Jardine Productions. Molly Meldrum was a regular member of the on-air team. Uptight – Party Time, by Ross D. Wyllie and the Uptight Party Team, was issued via Calendar/Festival Records in 1968. The record was produced by Roger Savage. It contains two side-long medleys of then-current songs including, "Midnight Hour", "You Are My Sunshine" and "Day Tripper".

Wyllie had a No. 17 hit on Go-Set's National Top 40 in July 1969, with his cover of Ray Stevens' song, "Funny Man". His National No. 1 hit, "The Star", followed in November. "The Star", written by Johnny Young, was later covered by United Kingdom act Herman's Hermits as "Here Comes the Star".

In 1970 Uptight was replaced on Channel 0 by a one-hour pop music series, Happening '70, with Wyllie retained as host and Eileen as producer. In April he released a double-A-sided single, "Free Born Man" / "My Little Girl", but its sales were affected by the radio ban, during which commercial stations refused to play recordings by Festival Records (among others) from May to October. The singer, presenter left Melbourne to return to Brisbane late in 1970 and was replaced on Happening '71, in April 1971, by Jeff Phillips.

In 1971 Wyllie signed with the Fable label and released a single, "He Gives Us All His Love", in April. He followed with "It Takes Time" in August and "Sweet White Dove" in May 1972.

Having acted in two episodes of Matlock Police in 1974-75, he played the part of television security man Chiller in early episodes of the TV series The Box. Chiller, a Vietnam veteran, sabotages operations around Channel 12 and terrorises Fanny Adams (Vanessa Leigh) in her dressing room before being knocked out by Tony Wild (Ken James). He is institutionalised, but the following year Wyllie returned for a further five episodes in which Chiller is released and resumes stalking Fanny who eventually persuades him to seek further treatment.

Wyllie then turned to the pub and club circuit. Later he formed a production company with fellow pop singer, Ronnie Burns, and talent manager, Jeff Joseph. With Tony Healey he created a public relations company. In the late 1970s he presented a late-night movie show on Melbourne's Channel 0–10. During the mid-1970s Wyllie opened and operated a record retail store in Bayswater, Arch Rivals.

In May 1988 Festival Records released, Smile: The Festival Files Volume Ten, a compilation album of Wyllie's singles, as a part of their Festival File series. In a review of the collection for The Canberra Times, Stuart Coupe observed, "Star of Uptight, Wyllie's run of hits ended in the early '70s. This is probably the least interesting of the albums in this series, but at worst is a curio item." In August 2003 Wyllie performed an Uptight-themed variety show at the Palais Theatre, Melbourne, reuniting with other 1960s performers.

Aztec Records released another compilation, Ross D. Wyllie: the Complete Collection, in August 2014. Paul Cashmere of Noise11 described it as "the first definitive career overview of 60s pop star." Toorak Times' Gary Turner observed, "[it features] all the classic hits including 'Funny Man', 'The Star', 'My Little Girl', 'Smile', 'Uptight Party Medley', 'Short Skirts' and many more tracks including tracks live from Festival Hall Melbourne in 1994." Wyllie and wife were still living in Melbourne as from September 2014. During November 2016 Wyllie used a crowd funding site to raise money for a motorised wheelchair. During COVID-19 pandemic in Australia, in November 2020, Wyllie and his wife moved into a retirement village.

== Discography ==
=== Compilation albums ===
List of compilation albums, with selected details
Title	Details
Uptight – Party Time (by Ross D. Wyllie and the Uptight Party Team)	Released: 1969; Label: Calendar / Festival (R66-522)
Smile: The Festival Files Volume Ten	Released: May 1988; Label: Festival (L-19010)
Ross D. Wyllie: The Complete Collection	Released: 14 August 2014; Label: Aztec (AVSCD071)

=== EPs ===
List of EPs, with selected details
Title	Details
Funny Man	Released: 1969; Label: Festival (FX11618)

=== Singles ===
List of singles, with selected chart positions
Year	Title	Peak chart positions
Year	Title	AUS
1967	"Short Skirts"	—
1967	"A Bit of Love"	—
1968	"Smile"	—
1969	"Funny Man"	17
1969	"The Star"	1
1970	"My Little Girl"	65
1971	"He Gives Us All His Love"	42
1971	"It Takes Time"	78
1972	"Sweet White Dove"	99

== See also ==
- List of Australian music television shows
