= Hold On! (album) =

1966 album by Herman's Hermits, released in the U.S.

Soundtrack album by Herman's Hermits
- Released: March 1966 (US); June 1966 (UK EP)
- Genre: Pop
- Length: 22:54
- Labels: MGM (US/Canada); Columbia (UK)
- Producer: Mickie Most

Herman's Hermits British chronology
When the Boys Meet the Girls (1966)	Hold On! (1966)	Both Sides of Herman's Hermits (1966)

Herman's Hermits American chronology
When the Boys Meet the Girls (1966)	Hold On! (1966)	Both Sides of Herman's Hermits (1966)

Professional ratings
Review scores
Source	Rating
AllMusic	3/5 stars

Hold On! is the third US album by the pop rock group Herman's Hermits. It was released in March 1966 by MGM Records and is the soundtrack album to the film of the same name. It was not released in the United Kingdom but an EP was released by EMI/Columbia (catalogue number SEG 8503) featuring 6 tracks.

== Background ==
The film's producers had recruited Fred Karger, a Hollywood composer who had served as music director of the group's previous movie, When the Boys Meet the Girls, to write the songs for the movie. In an interview on a television documentary on The British Invasion, Peter Noone recalled that the original title of the film was There's No Place Like Space, for which Karger had written the theme song. However, the group and their manager Mickie Most agreed that the song wasn't right for them and, instead, asked co-star Shelley Fabares' then-husband, record producer Lou Adler, for help. Adler recommended songwriter P.F. Sloan to compose the title track for the film. Sloan's recollection was that the film was to be renamed A Must to Avoid, and he wrote a song for that title, with some contributions from his writing partner Steve Barri. When the studio vetoed that title, the film was then retitled Hold On! after another one of Sloan's songs.

Ultimately, the ten-song US soundtrack album included five songs written by Karger, including the lone song sung by Fabares, four songs written by Sloan/Barri, and one Hermits cover of a 1937 British music hall song. The six-song UK EP used all four Sloan/Barri songs and just two of the Karger songs.

"A Must to Avoid" and a re-recorded version of "Leaning on a Lamp Post" both reached the Billboard Top 10 as singles in the US; a re-recorded "Hold On!" was the B-side of the latter. "A Must to Avoid" was also a top 10 hit in the UK.

"Gotta Get Away" is listed in the opening credits, but does not appear in the movie. "We Want You, Herman", written by Fred Karger, Sid Wayne and Ben Weisman, appears in the movie, but does not appear on the soundtrack album. The latter song is performed in the film by a female marching band.

== Track listing ==
=== US LP version ===
Side 1

1. "Hold On!" (Steve Barri, P.F. Sloan) – 2:06
2. "The George and Dragon" (Fred Karger, Sid Wayne, Ben Weisman) – 2:09
3. "Got a Feeling" (Karger, Wayne, Weisman) – 2:08
4. "Wild Love" (Karger, Wayne, Weisman) – 2:24
5. "Leaning on a Lamp Post" (Noel Gay) – 2:34

Side 2

1. "Where Were You When I Needed You?" (Barri, Sloan) – 2:48
2. "All the Things I Do for You Baby" (Barri, Sloan) – 2:18
3. "Gotta Get Away" (Karger, Wayne, Weisman) – 1:55
4. "Make Me Happy" (Karger, Wayne, Weisman) (Sung by Shelley Fabares) – 2:14
5. "A Must to Avoid" (Barri, Sloan) – 2:18

=== UK EP version ===
Side 1

1. "Where Were You When I Needed You?"
2. "Hold On!"
3. "The George and Dragon"

Side 2

1. "All the Things I Do for You Baby"
2. "Wild Love"
3. "A Must to Avoid"

== Charts ==
Chart performance for Hold On!
Chart (1966)	Peak position
US Billboard Top LPs	14
US Cashbox Album Charts	15
