= Leaning on a Lamp-post =

1937 song by Noel Gay

Single by George Formby
- Recorded: 5 September 1937
- Label: Regal Zonophone
- Songwriter: Noel Gay

"Leaning on a Lamp-post" is a popular song written by Noel Gay. The best known version was recorded by George Formby.

== Background ==
It was first performed in the 1937 film Feather Your Nest, in contrasting styles by Val Rosing and Formby. The film's plot revolves around Formby, a gramophone record technician, hearing Rosing record the song but then breaking the master disc and substituting his own voice. Formby recorded the song for Regal Zonophone Records on 5 September 1937, and it became one of his most popular and best-remembered songs. The sheet music for the song was published by Cinephonic Music Co Ltd. of London, at two shillings.

== Herman's Hermits' version ==
"Leaning on the Lamp Post"

Single by Herman's Hermits

from the album Hold On!
- B-side: "Hold On!"
- Released: April 1966
- Genre: Pop rock
- Length: 2:40
- Label: MGM
- Songwriter: Noel Gay
- Producer: Mickie Most

Herman's Hermits US singles chronology
"Listen People" (1966)	"Leaning on the Lamp Post" (1966)	"This Door Swings Both Ways" (1966)

A version by Herman's Hermits, credited as "Leaning on the Lamp Post", reached number nine on the US Billboard Hot 100 in 1966.

The song was featured in the film Hold On! starring the group, and also appeared on its soundtrack album. In the UK, the track appeared on the British version of Both Sides of Herman's Hermits. The original single release did not credit a publisher or writer.

=== Charts ===
Chart performance for "Leaning on the Lamp Post"
Chart (1966)	Peak position
Australia (Kent Music Report)	9
Canada RPM 100	4
Malaysia (Billboard Hits of the World)	2
New Zealand (NZ Listener)	6
US Billboard Hot 100	9
US Cash Box Top 100	8

== In popular culture ==
The song was added to the 1985 production of Me and My Girl, despite not being in the original 1937 version of the musical.
