= No Milk Today =

Single by Herman's Hermits

from the album There's a Kind of Hush All Over the World
- B-side: "My Reservation's Been Confirmed"
- Released: 30 September 1966 (UK); January 1967 (US)
- Recorded: 13 August 1966
- Studio: De Lane Lea, London
- Genre: Baroque pop, pop
- Length: 2:56
- Songwriter: Graham Gouldman
- Producer: Mickie Most

Herman's Hermits singles chronology
"This Door Swings Both Ways" (1966)	"No Milk Today" (1966)	"East West" (1966)

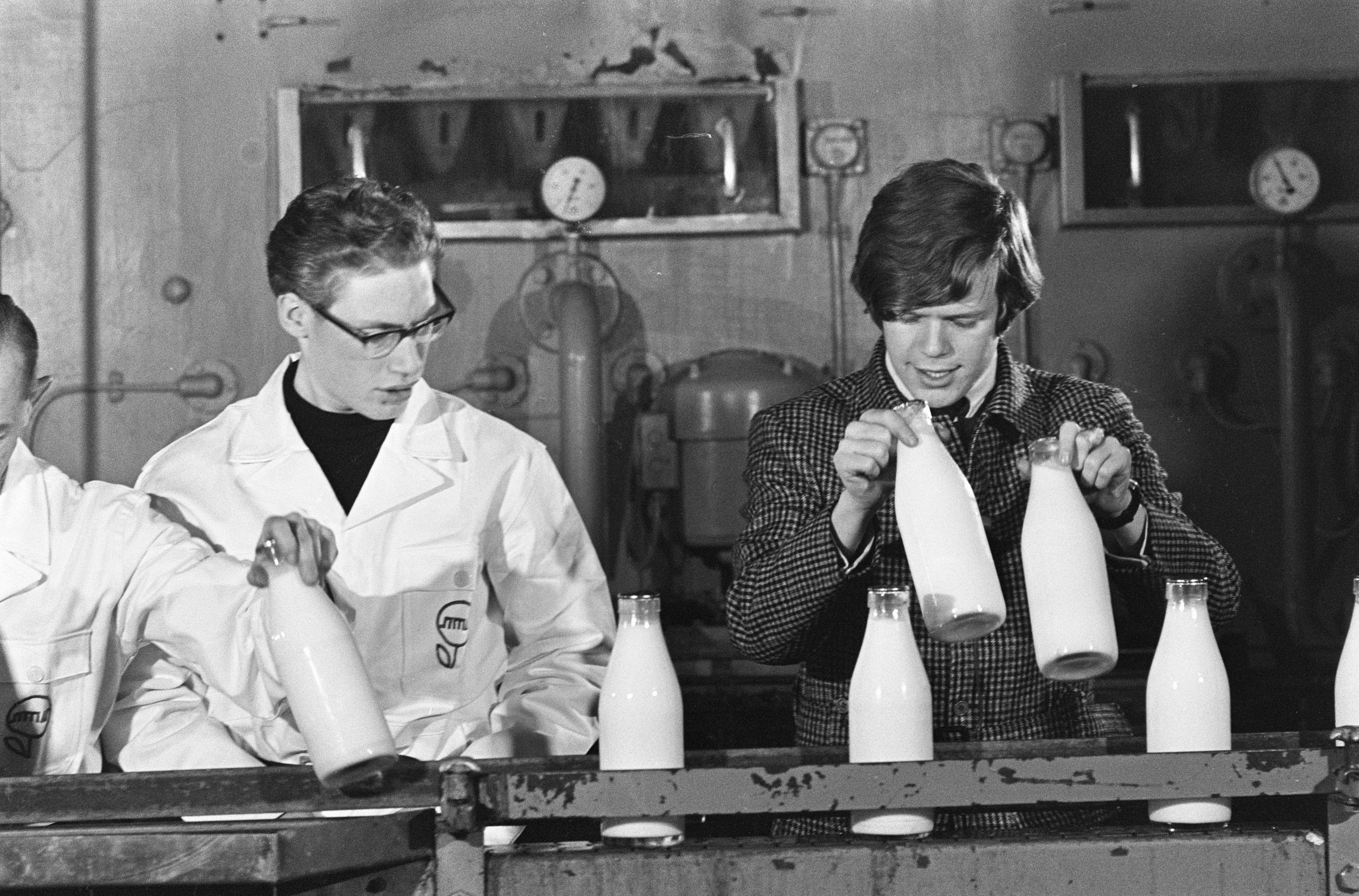
"Herman" (Peter Noone) in a Dutch dairy factory, after the handing over of a gold record for "No Milk Today" in the Netherlands (1966)

"No Milk Today" is a song that was written by Graham Gouldman and originally recorded by British pop band Herman's Hermits. It was first released as a single by the Mancunian group in the UK in October 1966 and, with the B-side "My Reservation's Been Confirmed", enjoyed chart success, peaking at No. 7 in the UK Singles Chart. Although not released as a single in the US ("Dandy" was released in its place with the same B-side), it was popular enough to become a moderate hit when it was released there as the B-side to "There's a Kind of Hush", reaching No. 35 in 1967 (the A-side reaching No. 4). It was also a major hit in many European countries.

== Music and lyrics ==
The song, which is dominated by its downcast reflective verses in A-minor and neatly complemented by its interjecting upbeat chorus in A-major, was the second major song Gouldman wrote for Herman's Hermits (the previous being "Listen People", a US #3).

The lyrics refer to the practice, common at the time, of milkmen delivering fresh milk in bottles to residential houses each morning. The love interest of the song's protagonist has just moved out, so the household needs less milk. The notice in front of the house, asking the milkman not to leave the usual bottle, while seeming mundane to passers-by ("how could they know just what this message means?"), symbolises to the singer himself the break-up of his relationship ("the end of all my dreams"). Gouldman wrote the song for The Hollies after he saw a "no milk today" notice outside a friend's house one day, and his father observed that could be for various reasons.

The single was the first track for which the band employed a string section.

John Paul Jones, later of Led Zeppelin fame, was credited for introducing the chimes during the song, publicly praised by Peter Noone.

== Chart performance ==
Chart (1967)	Peak position
Argentina (Cash Box)	18
Australia (Kent Music Report)	1
Austria (Ö3 Austria Top 40)	1
Belgium (Ultratop 50 Flanders)	2
Belgium (Ultratop 50 Wallonia)	2
Brazil (IBOPE)	9
Finland (Suomen virallinen lista)	2
France (IFOP)	17
Ireland (IRMA)	7
Italy (Musica e dischi)	90
Malaysia (Rediffusion)	1
Netherlands (Single Top 100)	1
Netherlands (Dutch Top 40)	1
New Zealand (Lever Hit Parade)	2
Norway (VG-lista)	1
Singapore (Rediffusion)	1
Sweden (Kvällstoppen)	2
Switzerland (Musikmarkt)	4
UK Singles (The Official Charts Company)	7
US Billboard Hot 100	35
West Germany (GfK)	2

== Recordings ==
Later the song was recorded by Gouldman himself as the sole single (released with "The Impossible Years") from his 1968 debut album The Graham Gouldman Thing and, in 2006, the 10cc compilation album Greatest Hits ... And More, included Gouldman's 1968 solo recording.

The song was extensively used in a 2009 commercial campaign for the Norwegian milk company Tine. It was also used for a commercial of the Australian milk company NSW Milk in the 1990s.

A German version "Brötchen und Milch" was released by the Oldenburg beat group The Four Kings on the Metronome label in 1966. The Spanish rendering "Todo Cambió" was recorded in 1967 by Lita Torelló (es). In 1984 it became a big Czechoslovak hit sung by Josef Melen as "Né, pětku né!" (No F-grade, no!; words by František Ringo Čech).

"No Milk Today" has also been included in the official Sons of Anarchy soundtrack, covered by frequent soundtrack contributor The Forest Rangers, featuring folk singer Joshua James. The cover appeared in the first episode of season 3.

The ex YU and Serbian band Riblja Čorba produced a hard rock cover in Serbian, "Danas nema mleka", a protest song criticizing the Slobodan Milošević regime, for their 1993 album Zbogom, Srbijo. Inspired by the title of the original, the Serbian cover turns the meaning around and opens up with the lyrics "Danas nema mleka, danas nema hleba" ("today there is no milk, today there is no bread"), criticizing the heavily declined standard of living in Serbia at the time.

== See also ==
- Herman's Hermits discography
