= Uptight (TV series) =

- Genre: Music
- Presented by: Ross D. Wyllie
- Country of origin: Australia
- Original language: English
- No. of seasons: 3

Production
- Production locations: Melbourne, Victoria
- Running time: 4 hours

Original release
- Network: ATV-0
- Release: 1967 – 1969

Uptight is an Australian music television series which aired on ATV-0 in Melbourne from 1967 until 1969 on Saturday mornings at 8am to 12pm, it was hosted by singer Ross D. Wyllie.

A compilation album, Uptight – Party Time, by Ross D. Wyllie and the Uptight Party Team, was issued via Calendar/Festival Records in 1968. The record was produced by Roger Savage. It features two medleys of then-current songs including, "Midnight Hour", "You Are My Sunshine" and "Day Tripper".

In August 2003 Wyllie compered a reunion stage show, Uptight, with the line-up of fellow 1960s artists and regular performers: Jim Keays (The Masters Apprentices), Marcie Jones, Ronnie Charles (The Groop, Bobby Bright (Bobbie and Laurie), and the Strangers at Melbourne's Palais Theatre.
