= Herman's Hermits =

English beat rock band

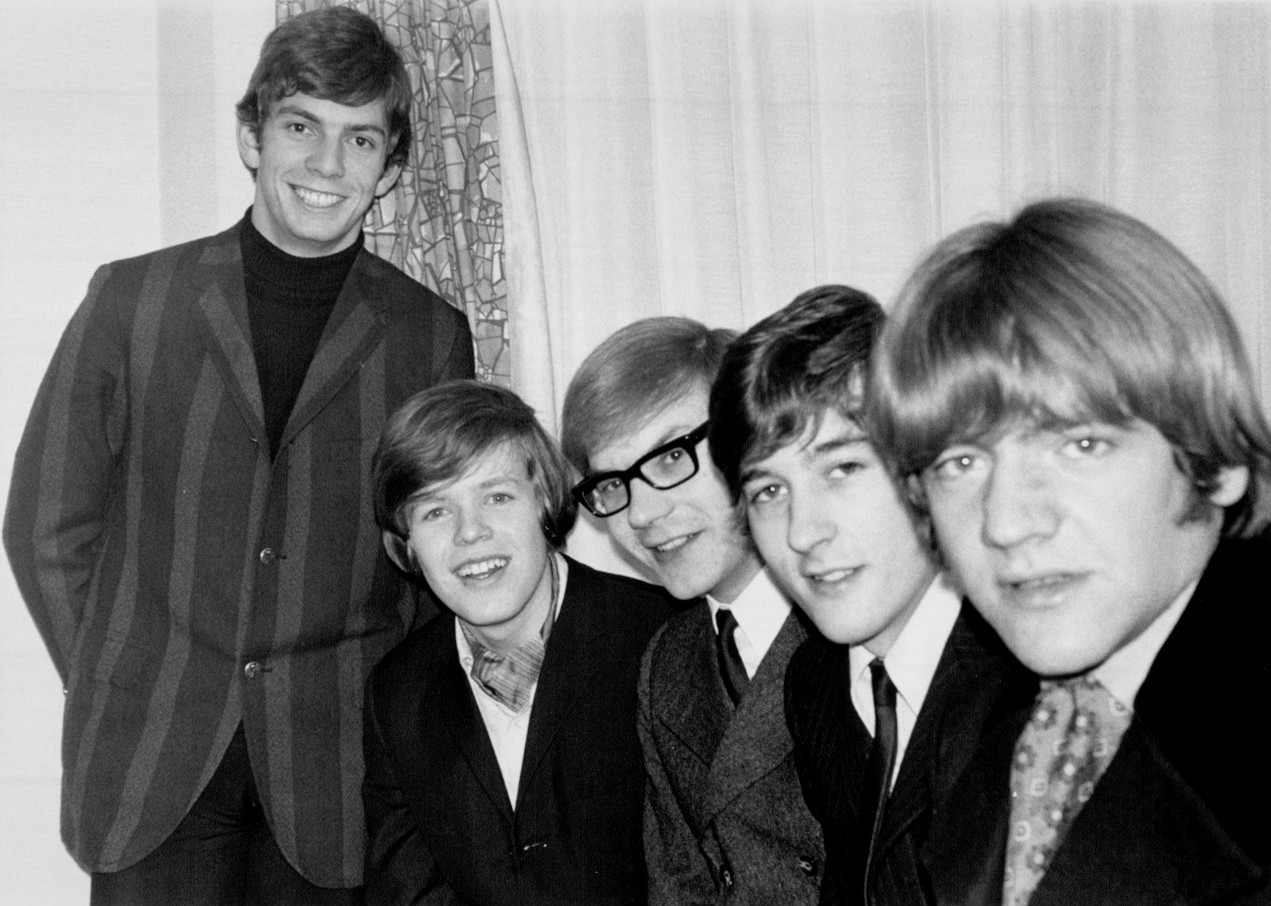
- Herman's Hermits in 1967. Left to right: Barry Whitwam, Peter Noone, Derek Leckenby, Keith Hopwood, Karl Green

Background information
- Origin: Manchester, England
- Genres: Pop rock; music hall; bubblegum
- Years active: 1963–present
- Labels: Columbia (EMI); MGM; Rak; RCA; CBS; Private Stock; Buddah; Roulette
- Members: Barry Whitwam; Jamie Thurston; John Summerton; Tony Young
- Past members: Peter Noone; Derek Leckenby; Keith Hopwood; Karl Green; See all former members at Band members
- Website: hermanshermits.co.uk

Herman's Hermits are an English pop rock group formed in 1963 in Manchester and fronted by singer Peter Noone. Known for their jaunty beat sound and Noone's often tongue-in-cheek vocal style, the Hermits charted with numerous transatlantic hits in the UK and in America, where they ranked as one of the most successful acts in the Beatles-led British Invasion. Between March and August 1965 in the United States, the group logged twenty-four consecutive weeks in the Top Ten of Billboard's Hot 100 with five singles, including the two number ones "Mrs. Brown, You've Got a Lovely Daughter" and "I'm Henry VIII, I Am".

Their other international hits in the 1960s include "I'm into Something Good" (their sole UK number one), "Can't You Hear My Heartbeat", the two covers "Silhouettes" and "Wonderful World", "A Must to Avoid", "Listen People", "No Milk Today", "There's a Kind of Hush", "I Can Take or Leave Your Loving", "Something's Happening" and "My Sentimental Friend", all of which were produced by Mickie Most. The band had at least ten Top-10 singles both in Britain and the US. Herman's Hermits also appeared in four films, two of which were vehicles for the band.

== History ==
=== 1963-1964: Formation ===
Herman's Hermits was formed from two different local bands. Keith Hopwood (rhythm guitar, backing vocals), Karl Green (lead guitar, backing vocals), Alan Wrigley (bass), Steve Titterington (drums) and Peter Noone (lead vocals) came from Pete Novak (Note: Also spelled Novac in some sources.) and the Heartbeats. Hopwood later replaced the group's former rhythm guitarist Alan Chadwick. Green was formerly in another group, the Balmains. The second-youngest member of a young group, 15-year-old Noone was already an experienced actor on the TV soap opera Coronation Street. Wrigley, at age 19, was considered the ""old man" of the group".

Noone recalled that a publican noted a resemblance between Noone and Sherman from the Rocky and Bullwinkle cartoons, and suggested the group "should call [themselves] the hermits because you look like bloody hermits". Green has also been credited for originating the group's name. Sherman was shortened to Herman, and the group became Herman and the Hermits. In November 1963, Manchester Evening News reported that the group had "sent off a recording they made to a big record company".

Harvey Lisberg discovered the group at The Collingwood Club in Urmston during the summer of 1963. Lisberg and his friend Charlie Silverman became the group's managers on 5 November, and began booking concert dates. After several failed attempts to book the group at Liverpool's Cavern Club, Lisberg invited the club's DJ Bob Wooler to watch one of the group's performances in Manchester. Wooler was able to persuade the club's owner Ray McFall to book the band at the Cavern. In his 2024 autobiography A Hermit's Tale, Hopwood wrote that Wooler had promised the group a couple of tracks in a proposed album called "The Cavern Presents". Although the album never came to fruition, Hopwood wrote "it was good to have interest".

The Plaza Ballroom, a popular venue where the band performed every Saturday night, was within close proximity to Granada Television, where music executive Johnnie Hamp and Michael Parkinson produced a nightly magazine show called Scene at 6.30. Lisberg convinced Hamp and Parkinson to come to the Plaza. Arriving at the end of the show, Hamp saw the band perform their version of Nat Kendrick and the Swans' "(Do the) Mashed Potatoes". In the Herman's Hermits iteration, there was an abundance of kicking and leaping. Hamp made it a condition that this song be performed on the programme. The broadcast was piped to the A&R team at EMI. Shortly after, Hamp invited the band back for a second TV outing. The group recorded two songs, "Sweet & Lovely" and "Rip It Up", at the Urmston Recording Club. Following this, Hamp sent a crew to the Cavern to film the band performing their entire act, including unloading and setting up equipment and the sound check.

Soon after, the Plaza's manager, Terry Devine, gave Lisberg a contact for Derek Everett at EMI. Lisberg met Everett, who worked in the sales division, in London. Everett offered to connect Lisberg to Mickie Most, an independent producer who worked with EMI. After briefly conversing with Most over the phone, Lisberg returned to Manchester and sent a postcard of the group to Most to encourage his response, followed by "two first class plane tickets, plus a night in a top Manchester hotel, inviting him to come and see the band perform. And this time he took the bait." In 1982, when Most was interviewed for the BBC Radio 1 programme and accompanying book The Record Producers, he recalled that upon receiving the postcard, he was intrigued by Noone's resemblance to "a young John F. Kennedy" and told the group's management he wanted to see them in concert. Most recalled "they didn't play so well, but [Noone] had a nice personality and that Kennedy look, which was what I liked." Lisberg recalled Most arriving to see the group at the Beachcomber club in Bolton. After the concert, Most informed Lisberg to sack the current bassist and drummer before Most would produce the group. Lisberg then informed Wrigley and Titterington of their dismissal from the band at Peter Noone's house. In a 1972 interview, Noone remembered the group auditioning for Most at a studio shortly after the performance, and stated, "We were having success so we didn't notice it, but we were unrecordable. [...] [Most] wanted me to kick two guys out of the band, which occurred, typically enough, in a Chinese restaurant. They took it great and I took it bad." (Note: After Wrigley was sacked from the band, Lisberg recalled he and Noone seeing Wrigley "lying prostrate in the middle of the road" while driving to meet with Green and Hopwood. Lisberg was forced to swerve his car to avoid running over Wrigley.) Hopwood recalled that the group's audition for Most took place at Kingsway Studios on 19 April 1964.

Lisberg and Silverman then held auditions for replacement members. Bassist Derek Leckenby and drummer Barry Whitwam had previously been members of another local group, the Wailers. They impressed Lisberg and Silverman with their performance of "Hava Nagila" and subsequently joined the newly renamed Herman's Hermits. (Note: Sources vary as to exactly when the group officially shortened their name, with dates of 1 April or 22 April reported.) Green later switched to bass guitar and Leckenby took over from Green as lead guitarist. Hopwood recalled that Lisberg paid one of the band members £200 for the rights to the Herman and the Hermits name. On 22 April 1964, the new lineup of the band assembled in the basement of Charlie Silverman's house, where "the band immediately sounded better by a long way" and "with the change in personnel, we also changed the name, shortening it to "Herman's Hermits".

=== 1964-1969: International success ===
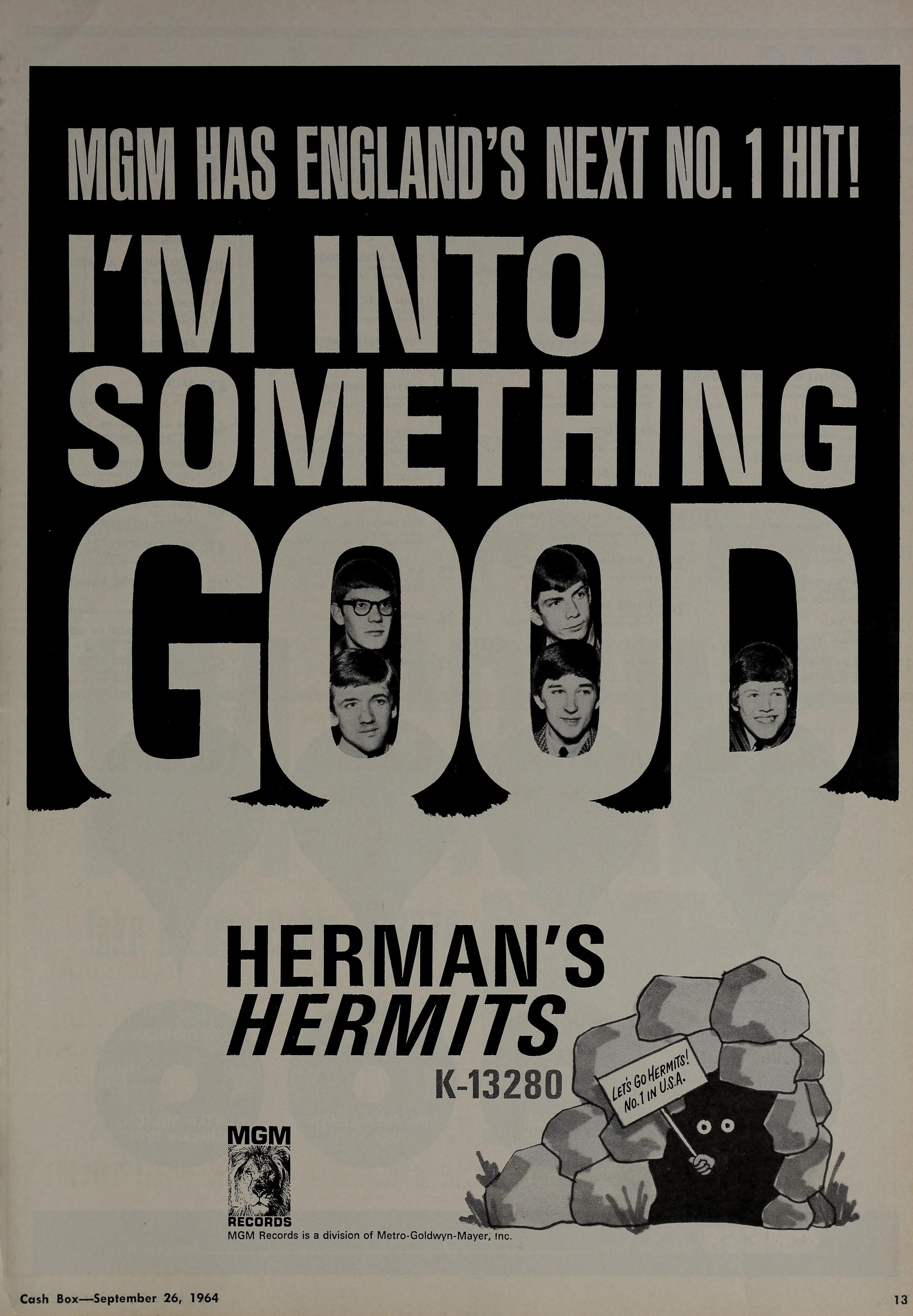
Cashbox advertisement for "I'm Into Something Good", 26 September 1964

Herman's Hermits' debut single was a cover of Gerry Goffin and Carole King's "I'm Into Something Good", a then-recent US Top 40 hit for Earl-Jean. The song and its B-side, "Your Hand in Mine", composed by Lisberg and Silverman, were recorded in a three-hour session at Kingsway Studios on 26 July 1964. Most disliked the recording, but his wife convinced him to release the single. "I'm Into Something Good" was released by EMI's Columbia label on 7 August. On 24 September, the single replaced The Kinks' "You Really Got Me" at number one in the UK singles chart, where it stayed for two weeks and became Herman's Hermits' only number one in Britain. MGM Records, a division of the Metro-Goldwyn-Mayer movie studio, released the single in America, where it reached number 13 on the Billboard Hot 100 in December. The group remained with the label in the US until the end of 1969, and would appear in several films for its parent company. Lisberg partnered with Danny Betesh of Kennedy Street Enterprises to help manage Herman's Hermits.

Herman's Hermits' next single was another Goffin and King composition, "Show Me Girl", which reached number 19 on the UK charts in December 1964. That month, EMI released the group's first EP, Hermania, which featured three covers and one original song, "Thinkin' of You". MGM did not issue "Show Me Girl" as a single in North America, instead opting to release "Can't You Hear My Heartbeat" in January 1965 as the group's follow-up single. The song went to number two on the Billboard Hot 100 in the US. In the UK, EMI issued "Can't You Hear My Heartbeat" as the B-side of the group's third single, a cover of The Rays' "Silhouettes". Herman's Hermits' version of the song charted at number six in the UK and number five in the US. Their next single release in the UK was a cover of Sam Cooke's song "Wonderful World", which proved to be another transatlantic hit, charting at number four in the US and number seven in the UK.

In February 1965, MGM issued the band's self-titled first US album, also known as Introducing Herman's Hermits. The album included both sides of the group's first two UK singles, and what would become their next US hit, "Mrs. Brown, You've Got a Lovely Daughter". The song originated from the 1963 television play The Lads, which aired on the ITV Television Playhouse series. MGM rushed "Mrs. Brown" into release as a single after it began receiving heavy radio play in the US. The album reached number two on the Billboard Top LPs chart. The number 12 debut of "Mrs. Brown" on the Billboard Hot 100 in April was the decade's third highest (behind the Beatles' "Hey Jude" and "Get Back"). The song reached the top of the charts on 1 May, where it remained for three weeks, and became Herman's Hermits' first number one in the US. It was not released as a single in Britain, though it did appear as the sole new track on the Columbia EP Mrs. Brown, You've Got a Lovely Daughter in June.

In April 1965, Herman's Hermits appeared as one of the musical acts in the Associated British-Pathé film Pop Gear. The group became the first British band to join the Dick Clark Caravan of Stars, a package tour which toured across the United States and ran until June. That month, MGM released the group's second US LP, Herman's Hermits On Tour, which again reached number two on the Billboard Top LPs chart. The album featured what would become the group's second US number one, "I'm Henry VIII, I Am", a remake of the 1910 Cockney-style music hall song made famous by Harry Champion. The single was said at the time to be "the fastest-selling song in history", but was not issued in the UK. "Mrs. Brown" and "Henry" were both included on the group's self-titled first UK album for EMI, released in August, which mostly featured tracks from Herman's Hermits on Tour. It was the only studio album by the group to chart in the UK, where it reached number 16.

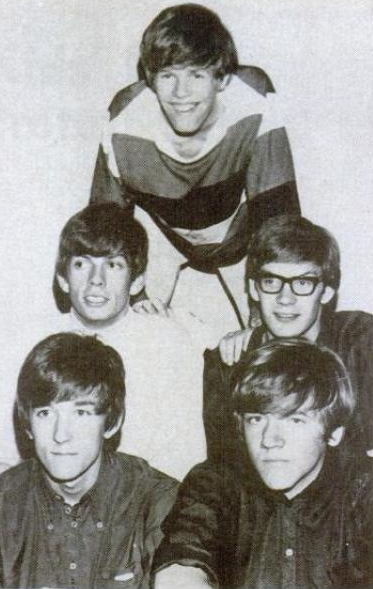
Herman's Hermits in 1965

In July, the band headed to MGM Studios in Hollywood for two days to film their scenes for When the Boys Meet the Girls, an adaptation of the 1930 musical Girl Crazy starring Connie Francis. In the film, the group performed the Graham Gouldman composition "Listen People", and Peter Noone, who played a character named Herman, sang George and Ira Gershwin's "Bidin' My Time". Afterwards, the group continued to tour America. In August, Noone, Hopwood, and Lisberg visited Elvis Presley on the set of his film Paradise, Hawaiian Style.

In September, Herman's Hermits began filming their first starring feature for MGM, Hold On!, which was released the following year. The film featured nine songs performed by the group, and one song performed by co-star Shelley Fabares. American songwriters P. F. Sloan and regular collaborator Steve Barri contributed several songs to the film, including the title song (written by Sloan), "Where Were You When I Needed You", and "A Must to Avoid". "A Must to Avoid" was issued as a single in December 1965, charting at number eight on the Billboard Hot 100 and number six in the UK. Billboard magazine ranked the group America's top singles act of the year, with the Beatles ranking at number two.

Following the release of When the Boys Meet the Girls in late 1965, MGM Records released the group's "Listen People" as a single in February 1966. Lisberg noted, "Within weeks it had gone to number three in the US, and the top of the charts in Canada." In the UK, the track was issued as the B-side of "You Won't Be Leaving", which charted at number 20, but was not released as a single in the US.

In March, MGM issued the Hold On! soundtrack album as the group's third US LP. They were nominated for three Grammy Awards, including Best New Artist of 1965 and two for their chart-topper "Mrs. Brown You've Got a Lovely Daughter": Best Performance by a Vocal Group and Best Contemporary (R&R) Performance – Group (Vocal or Instrumental). "Leaning on a Lamp Post" from the Hold On! soundtrack was the group's next US single. Lisberg wrote that he believed the song "might be perfect for them", and added that "Mickie, of course, didn't like the idea at all, but the band did and so did MGM". In the UK, Columbia issued a six-track EP featuring select songs from the Hold On! film.

In August 1966, MGM released the group's fourth US LP, Both Sides of Herman's Hermits, which featured the hit single "This Door Swings Both Ways" and the "heavy-style rocker" "My Reservation's Been Confirmed". EMI released a heavily modified version as the group's second UK album, retaining five songs from the US tracklist, while adding "Leaning on a Lamp Post" and "Listen People" among other songs. The group's cover of the Kinks' "Dandy", released in September, charted at number five in the US.

In the UK, after two consecutive Top 20 hits, Herman's Hermits returned to the Top Ten in November 1966 with "No Milk Today", also written by Gouldman. Lisberg stated that the track "was seen as a leap for the group, and for Peter in particular, but they jumped at the chance to try something with a bit more substance. Peter loved the track and believed it to be the best thing they ever did." MGM issued the song as the B-side of their next single, "There's a Kind of Hush", where it peaked at number 35 on the Billboard Hot 100. "No Milk Today" also scored in its own right, including success on San Francisco Top 40 station KFRC, where in April 1967, it reached number one, ranking sixth for the year. "There's a Kind of Hush" charted at number seven n the UK, and number four in the US, becoming Herman's Hermits' last top ten hit in America. Both songs were featured on the group's fifth US and third UK album, There's a Kind of Hush All Over The World. During the summer of 1967, The Who opened concerts for Herman's Hermits in the United States and Canada.

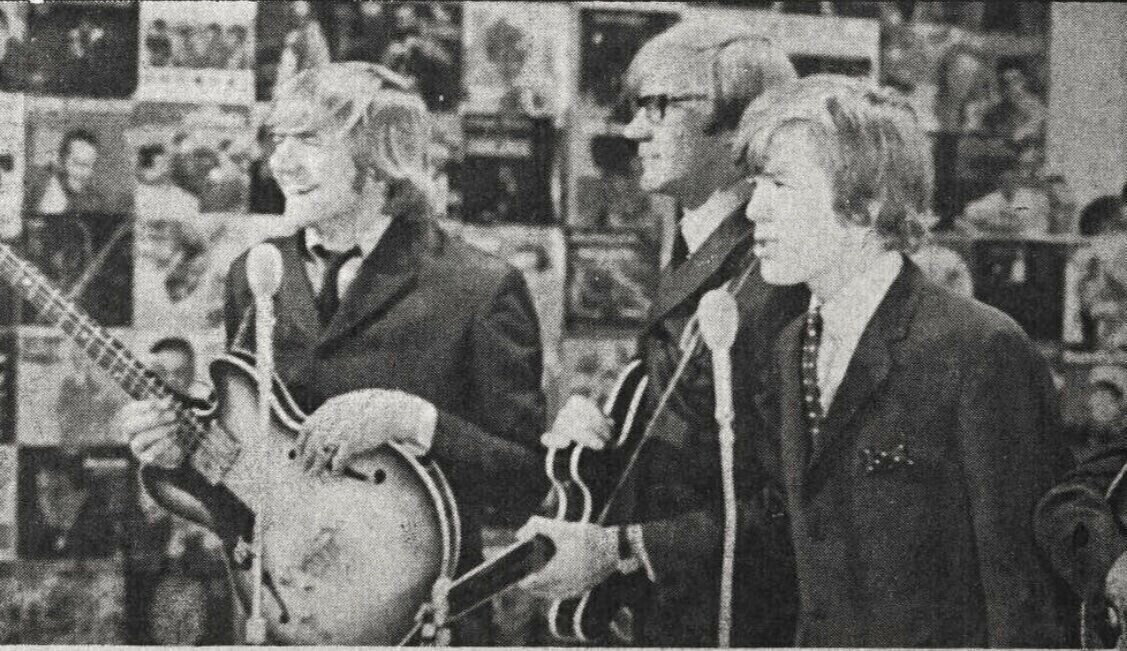
Green, Leckenby, and Noone on the set of Hullabaloo, c. early 1966

The group's sixth US album Blaze continued in a more mature direction, but only reached number 75 on the Billboard Top LPs chart. The album included the group's cover of Donovan's "Museum" and "Don't Go Out Into the Rain (You're Going to Melt)", which reached number 18 in the US.

Herman's Hermits' popularity in the US continued to decline throughout 1968. "I Can Take or Leave Your Loving" charted at number 11 in the UK, and number 22 on the Billboard Hot 100, becoming the group's last major hit in the country. That year, Hopwood and Derek Leckenby started a music company, Pluto Music, which is still in business as of 2026, working primarily on commercial and animation soundtracks. The group appeared in their second starring film for MGM, Mrs. Brown, You've Got a Lovely Daughter, produced by Allen Klein and shot in England. The film featured the title track and "There's a Kind of Hush". Graham Gouldman wrote several new songs for the movie, including "It's Nice to Be Out in the Morning" and "Lemon and Lime", which featured vocals by Stanley Holloway and each member of the group. The soundtrack album charted at number 182 in the US. In the UK, the group's "Sunshine Girl" charted at number eight in August and was the first of three consecutive top ten singles for the group. Their next single, "Something's Happening", reached number six in January 1969. In May, the group's "My Sentimental Friend" charted at number two. Their next single, a cover of Ross D. Wylie's "Here Comes The Star", appeared in November, and peaked at number 33.

In regards to the band's US releases, Hopwood recalled that by 1969, the group had felt "MGM had definitely taken their eye off the ball with regard to the band". According to Hopwood, legal issues with MGM over financial payments led to the group "[having] no other way to turn on the US".

=== 1970s: Final chart hits, departure of Peter Noone, and later singles ===
Herman's Hermits' final release for Columbia, "Years May Come, Years May Go", returned the group to the UK Top 10 for the last time, reaching number seven in early 1970. Afterwards, the group joined Most's new label RAK Records, with EMI continuing to distribute their singles outside of North America. The band's reggae-influenced debut single on RAK, "Bet Yer Life I Do", was co-written by Hot Chocolate members Errol Brown and Tony Wilson. The single was another shift in musical style for the group and reached number 22 in the UK.

On 9 November 1970, Peter Noone and Herman's Hermits were invited as part of the Royal Variety Command Performance in the presence of the Queen Mother at the London Palladium. Other invited performers included Dionne Warwick, Andy Williams and Freddie Starr. Originally there was an elaborate Broadway show number planned, featuring Noone singing a Barbra Streisand song, walking forward as the orchestra rose into the air on a riser. "Unfortunately," as Keith Hopwood (who thought the number was visually "absolutely stunning") said, Michael Grade revised the act to include a ten-minute medley which included the Cockney song "Fish and Chips" and "If I Were a Rich Man" from Fiddler on the Roof. The Hermits were not dancers or actors, but according to Hopwood, "we managed to get through it without tripping up the girls, but...our show was nearly done, in every sense." Noone was the only member of the group invited to shake hands with the Queen Mother after the show, which became another source of friction within the group. Using their newly found dance skills, Herman's Hermits headlined at the London Palladium for three weeks that November, using the rising stage, and singing classic Noël Coward songs, including "London Pride". Hopwood said that they were travelling on "Peter's road...not really the band's and certainly not mine." According to Noone, during his time with Herman's Hermits, many of his career decisions were constrained by the need to maintain the group's employment and financial security, preventing him from pursuing solo opportunities like a role replacing Tommy Steele in Half a Sixpence due to other members' financial obligations. He reflected that on many occasions he prioritized the group's collective needs over his individual goals due to his youth.

An English language cover of the Italian song "Lady Barbara" became the group's final UK Top 20 hit, charting at number 13. The single was credited to "Peter Noone and Herman's Hermits". Lisberg recalled that the name change was a last-ditch attempt by the group to acknowledge Noone's role as the most popular member. Noone performed his last show with Herman's Hermits at the London Palladium in December. Peter Jones of the Evening Post noted that Noone and the Hermits stayed in separate dressing rooms, and wrote, "Apart from the actual stage shows, the two parties rarely spoke." In February 1971, Record Mirror announced that Peter Noone and the Hermits had parted ways following the expiration of their record contract. Noone stated, "We've had 21 hits together now and we all feel we want to go our separate ways and be free to do what we like". Noone pursued a solo career, while continuing to record with Most and his label. In April, RAK issued Noone's debut single "Oh You Pretty Thing", written by David Bowie. It charted at number 12 and was Noone's only charting solo single in the UK. After Noone's departure, the group changed their name to the Hermits and signed with RCA. Peter Cowap briefly became the group's new lead singer. Later that year, the Hermits released the single "She's a Lady", which was recorded at Strawberry Studios. Karl Green stated, "With four singing in the group we have a wider field of music to go at, and we can experiment more."

In 1972, the group prepared to record an album, A Whale of Tale, under the name Sourmash, produced by Eric Stewart. The album was not released, and Hopwood left the group shortly afterward. Hopwood has since become a composer of scores for film and television. None of the Hermits' singles during this period saw any significant success. Manchester Evening News described the Hermits' single, "The Man", as "a good, beaty effort that will just fail to break through". That year, singer-songwriter John Gaughan joined the Hermits. In 1973, Noone returned to front Herman's Hermits during a U.S. multi-artist tour of British Invasion acts. Gaughan released his first single, "You Gotta Love Me Baby" on CBS, credited to John Gaughan with the Hermits. By 1974, Gaughan had left the group. In 1975, the group released "Ginny Go Softly" on Private Stock. In the US, the group's 1976 Buddah single "I'm In a Lonely Situation (Love is All I Need)" reached number 121 in Record World. By 1978, Frank Renshaw had become the group's frontman, and participated on their single "Heart, Get Ready for Love".

=== 1980s-present: Later years ===
Karl Green left the group in 1980 to spend more time with his family. He later opened a plumbing and tiling business in London. Green later became a manager of sound systems for concert venues along London's South Bank, and toured with his own group, the Karl Green Band, in the mid-2010s.

Renshaw had left Herman's Hermits by 1983. In 1986, the group performed with the Monkees on their US reunion tour. In the late 1980s, Rod Gerrard, formerly of Salford Jets, joined the group, and performed guitar and vocals. In 1992, Green and Hopwood reunited with Barry Whitwam and Leckenby for a one-off performance. In a 1993 article, Keith William Robert was listed as performing vocals and bass guitar with the group.

Leckenby died of non-Hodgkin lymphoma on 4 June 1994, leaving Whitwam as the only original member of Herman's Hermits. That night, the group performed a concert in Berlin as scheduled. Whitwam commented, "It is as he would have wanted".

Noone continues to play solo shows billed as "Herman's Hermits starring Peter Noone". On 8 June 1997, Hopwood, Green, and Whitwam reunited to play a one-off reunion concert with Noone. In 2000, Pluto released the 1972 Sourmash album under the title A Whale of a Tale! And Others.

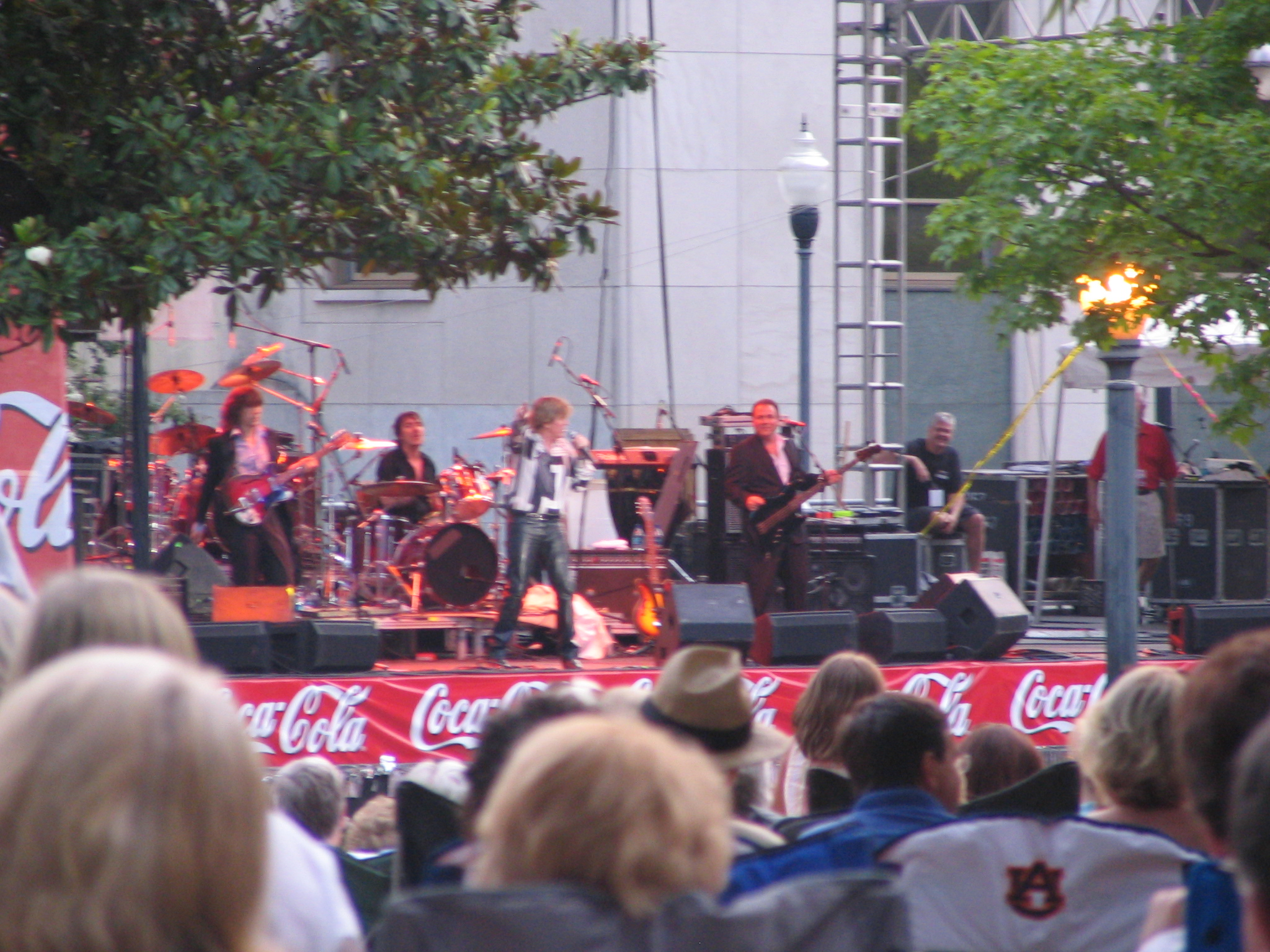
Herman's Hermits starring Peter Noone in 2006

Scottish-born keyboardist Robert Birrell joined in May 2002. He was diagnosed with cancer a few years later, and Kevan Lingard was added in on keyboards in 2005 to fill in for dates Birrell couldn't attend. Robert eventually left the band in September 2006 and died on 18 October 2008.

Paul Cornwell (guitarist from 2013 to 2019) was added into Dave Dee, Dozy, Beaky, Mick & Tich in January 2015 on bass as "Dozy II" following the death of original Dozy Trevor Ward-Davies.

In 2019, Noone won the "Entertainer of the Year" award at the Casino Entertainment Awards, held at the Hard Rock Hotel & Casino, beating out nominees Barry Manilow and Dwight Yoakam. In 2023, Herman's Hermits Starring Peter Noone were scheduled to perform in over 100 concerts in countries such as the US, Canada, Mexico, the United Kingdom and France. Herman's Hermits Starring Peter Noone performed 112 concerts in 2024, and in 2025 118 concerts.

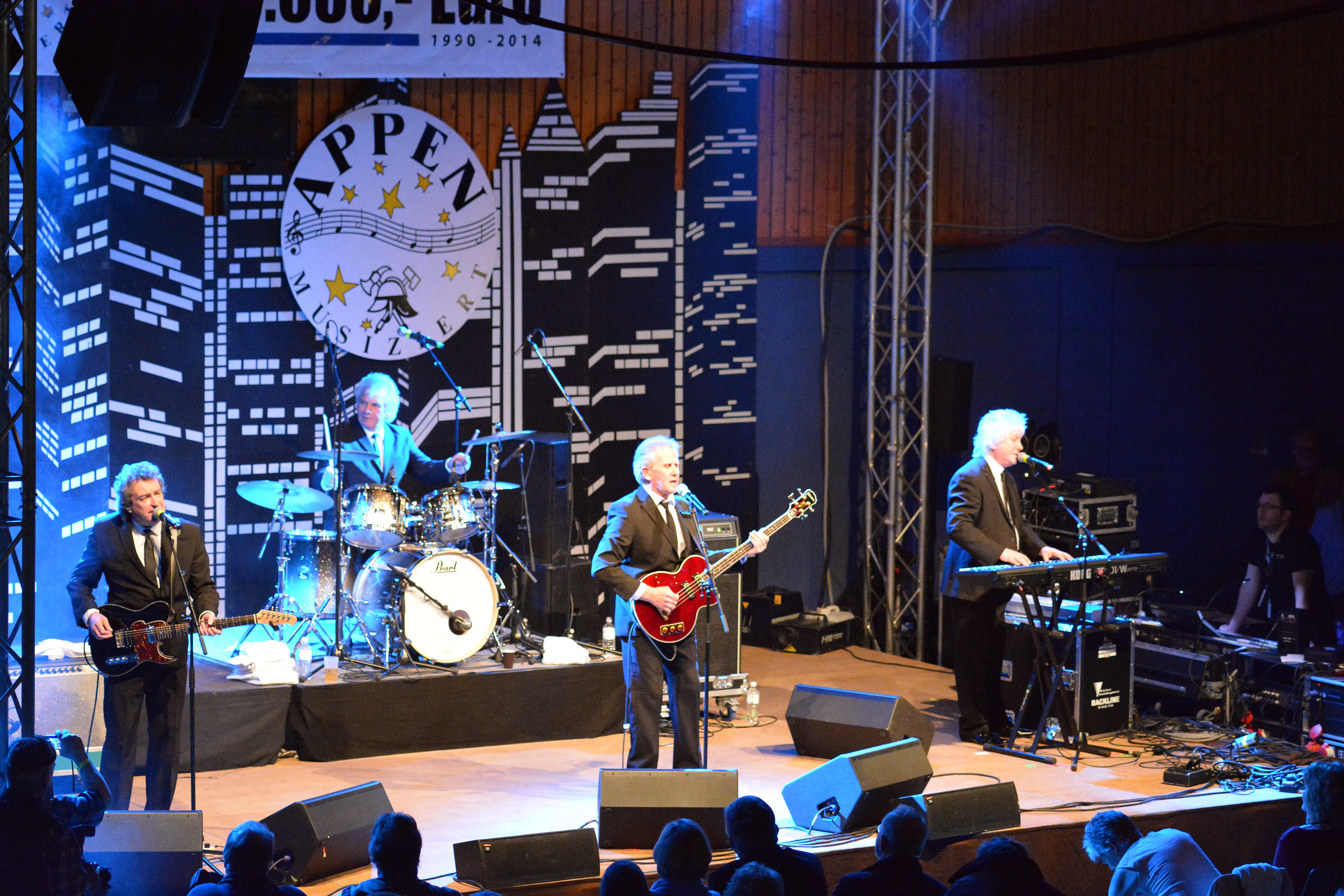
Herman's Hermits during their 50-year anniversary tour in April 2014. From left to right: Paul Cornwell, Barry Whitwam, Geoff Foot, Kevin Lingard

Geoff Foot, who, with the exception of Whitwam, was the longest serving member, left the Hermits after playing his last gig with them at a Butlin's on 14 January 2023. Foot was replaced by John Summerton. Later that year, Tony Hancox left the band after six years, and was replaced by Tony Young of Gerry's Pacemakers. Hancox's last performance with the Hermits was at the Leeds Grand Theatre on 29 October 2023, when they were touring in the Sixties Gold nostalgia tour. In turn, Hancox filled Young's place in Gerry's Pacemakers. As of April 2024, the current lineup of Herman's Hermits is: Barry Whitwam (drummer since 1964), Jamie Thurston (formerly of the Tornados starring Dave Watts; bassist and lead vocalist since 2020), John Summerton (formerly of Flintlock; guitarist since January 2023), and Tony Young (formerly of Gerry and the Pacemakers; keyboardist since October 2023).

On 25 April 2026, Peter Noone and Keith Hopwood appeared together at the Chiller Theatre Toy, Model and Film Expo in Parsippany, New Jersey to introduce the release of their CD Remember When, with music by Keith Hopwood and produced by Keith and his son Daniel.

== Legacy ==
In the UK, Herman's Hermits collected ten top 10 singles between 1964 and 1970, and eighteen top 20 singles overall. In the US, Herman's Hermits had nine consecutive top 10 singles on the Billboard Hot 100 between early 1965 and mid-1966. In total, the group collected eleven top 10 singles in the US, and 19 songs on the Billboard Hot 100. Five of the group's US LPs, including two greatest hits albums, were certified Gold by the Recording Industry Association of America.

=== Disputes over recording contributions ===
Conflicting information exists regarding the extent of Herman's Hermits' use of session musicians in their songs. In 1982, Mickie Most stated, "On some of the Herman records, I also used session musicians, although not always - if the songs needed arrangements, then I'd have session players, and very good ones at that." The group played on all their UK and US No. 1 hits ("I'm Into Something Good", "Mrs Brown You've Got a Lovely Daughter", and "I'm Henry VIII, I Am"), on most of their US Top Ten singles, on several other singles and most album cuts. According to Peter Noone, Derek Leckenby played the muted lead on "This Door Swings Both Ways" and the guitar solo on "I'm Henry VIII, I Am". In a 1972 interview, Noone said that Keith Hopwood played rhythm guitar on "Mrs. Brown".

In his autobiography I'm Into Something Good: My Life Managing 10cc, Herman's Hermits & Many More!, Harvey Lisberg stated that Mickie Most "was an absolutely key part of [Herman's Hermits'] success. His ability to pick a hit was uncanny, and once he had chosen a song, he'd book the best arrangers and session musicians and get everything ready." Hopwood wrote that as the band toured frequently, Most "sometimes prepared the tracks in our absence". Hopwood also noted, "I'm also sure there would not have been anything like the coverage there has been of this if Jimmy Page and John Paul Jones had not become half of Led Zeppelin." Noone said as time went on, "Mickie used The Hermits less and less. He and I discovered the process was faster, if not as much fun. We stupidly left The Hermits out of all the decisions, causing them to hate us and, I think, rightfully so."

The riff in "Silhouettes" has been variously credited to Jimmy Page, Big Jim Sullivan and Vic Flick; however, according to Keith Hopwood and Karl Green, Leckenby replaced Flick in the studio and played the signature riff under Most's direction. According to Hopwood, Green and Noone, Jimmy Page played on the single "Wonderful World" (although Big Jim Sullivan lists the song as part of a session he played); both may have added to the backing track. Several writers have claimed that session players played on "I'm Into Something Good"; according to the surviving band members, the song was recorded on a two-track recorder, with only a piano player in addition to the Hermits.

=== Legal disputes over "Herman's Hermits" name ===
Legal disputes between Whitwam and Noone have occurred since the 2000s. In 2003, members were forced to rename the band "Herman's Hermits starring Barry Whitwam" when they tour in North America, but remain billed as "Herman's Hermits" elsewhere.

These legal disputes over the Herman's Hermits band name have highlighted broader issues surrounding trademark ownership and the control of band identities. In 2004 in Australia, Whitwam successfully registered ownership of the band name, restricting its use by other former members. Legal commentators noted that the case raised wider concerns about the registration of intellectual property rights without the knowledge or consent of collaborators. The dispute has been compared to other band-name controversies, including litigation involving Glen Shorrock and the Original Little River Band, as well as a 2007 disagreement within The Angels concerning use of that group's name. Four years after Noone left the group to pursue a solo career, Leckenby, Green, and Whitwam initiated legal proceedings in the High Court of England seeking to prevent Noone from using the word "Hermits." The case was settled, with Noone agreeing not to use the term, while the remaining members continued performing under the name Herman's Hermits. Whitwam later toured in Europe under the name Herman's Hermits Starring Barry Whitwam and successfully registered the band name in the United Kingdom and Europe. Ownership of the name in the United States remained with other former members. After Whitwam applied to register the name in Australia, other band members said that shared use was necessary to allow them to enter contracts and receive royalties and performance-related income, however, in a decision issued by hearing officer Jock McDonagh, it was determined that the earlier UK settlement permitted any of Green, Leckenby, or Whitwam to continue performing under the Herman's Hermits name. Following Leckenby's death, Whitwam was the only surviving member actively performing under that name, and the hearing officer concluded that exclusive registration was therefore unlikely to cause public deception.

While Noone maintains a relationship with most of the original band members, he has acknowledged a strained dynamic with drummer Barry Whitwam over the ownership of the group's name. Noone noted that other band members shared this frustration after Whitwam assumed control of the Herman's Hermits trademark, which Noone believes should have been a collective asset. Despite this, Noone remains in contact with rhythm guitarist Keith Hopwood, with whom he continues to manage the band's business affairs, including recording contracts and publishing rights.

One such case in 2009 had the band sued by Peter Noone when advertisements for their tour in the US had "Herman's Hermits" in large text, with "starring/featuring Barry Whitwam" in small text underneath, which would not have been noticed by people looking at the advertisement, possibly misleading them into thinking that they were seeing an ad for Noone. A lawsuit unraveled, and Whitwam ultimately decided to stop touring in the United States with his band:

In 2009, our last tour of America we did, we agreed in 2003 that if I would tour America that I was Herman's Hermits Starring Barry Whitwam and when Peter went out it would be Herman's Hermits Starring Peter Noone. In 2009, the promoters, the buyers, didn't read the rider properly, got it wrong and said Herman's Hermits. Then in small letters, Featuring or With Barry Whitwam. The promoters got it wrong. Peter got wired up and we went to battle, litigation and all that stuff. [...] I decided it's not worth the hassle going out in America because every time you got booked, you got booked wrong, not the way it should have been. So 2009 was the last tour of America for me.

— Barry Whitwam

== Band members ==
Current members

- Barry Whitwam – drums (1963–present)
- Jamie Thurston – bass, lead and backing vocals (2020–present)
- John Summerton – guitar, lead and backing vocals (2023–present)
- Tony Young – keyboards, lead and backing vocals (2023–present)

Former members

- Derek Leckenby – lead guitar (1963–1994; died 1994)
- Karl Green – bass, vocals (1963–1980; one-off in 1997)
- Keith Hopwood – rhythm guitar, vocals (1963–1972; one-off in 1997)
- Peter Noone – lead vocals (1963–1971, 1973; one-off in 1997)
- Pete Cowap – lead vocals, rhythm guitar (1971–1972; died 1997)
- John Gaughan – rhythm guitar, vocals (1972–1974)
- Chris Finley (born 1948 in Liverpool, died February 2016) – keyboards, vocals (1973–1974)
- Lance Dixon – keyboards, vocals (1974)
- Frank Renshaw (born 22 June 1943 in Wythenshawe) – rhythm guitar, vocals (1975–1982)
- Paul Farnell – bass, vocals (1980–1988)
- Garth Elliott – rhythm guitar, vocals (1982–1986)
- Rod Gerrard – rhythm guitar, vocals (1986–1995)
- Geoff Foot – lead and backing vocals (1988–2023), bass (1988–2020), guitar (2020–2023)
- Alec Johnson (born 3 April 1953 in Northwich) – lead guitar (1994–2002)
- Geoff Kerry (born 28 August 1949 in Salford) – rhythm guitar, vocals (1995–2001)
- Graham Lee (born 1943 in Manchester) – rhythm guitar, vocals (2001–2004), lead guitar (2002–2004)
- Robert Birrell (born 25 November 1948, died 18 October 2008) – keyboards, vocals (2002–2006) (not touring 2005–2006)
- Eddy Carter (born 17 April 1957 in Manchester) – lead guitar, vocals (2004–2013)
- Kevan Lingard (born 28 October 1958 in Accrington) – keyboards, vocals (2005–2016)
- Simon Van Downham – rhythm guitar, vocals (2010–2011)
- Paul Cornwell – lead guitar, vocals (2013–2019)
- Justin LaBarge – rhythm guitar, vocals (2015–2019)
- Paul Robinson (born 1 December 1964) – keyboards, vocals (2016)
- Duncan Keith – guitar, vocals (2019)
- Ray Frost (born in Essex) – guitar, vocals (2019–2020)
- Tony Hancox (born 25 March 1972) – keyboards, vocals (2017–2023)

== Discography ==
Studio albums

- Introducing Herman's Hermits (1965, US)
- Herman's Hermits (1965, UK)
- Herman's Hermits on Tour (1965, US)
- Hold On! (1966, US)
- Both Sides of Herman's Hermits (1966, US/UK)
- There's a Kind of Hush All Over the World (1967, US/UK)
- Blaze (1967, US)
- Mrs. Brown, You've Got a Lovely Daughter (1968, US/UK)
- A Whale of a Tale! And Others (2000, UK) (as Sourmash - a.k.a. Herman's Hermits)

== Filmography ==
- When the Boys Meet the Girls (1965)
- Hold On! (1966)
- Mrs. Brown, You've Got a Lovely Daughter (1968)

=== Other film and television appearances ===
- Pop Gear (1965)
- Herman's Hermits Hilton Show (1966)
- Inside Pop: The Rock Revolution (1967)
- In Concert: With Herman's Hermits (1968)
