= You Won't Be Leaving =

Single by Herman's Hermits

from the album There's a Kind of Hush All Over the World
- B-side: "Listen People"
- Released: 11 March 1966 (UK); February 1967 (US)
- Recorded: De Lane Lea Studios, London, March 1966
- Genre: Pop rock
- Length: 2:15
- Label: Columbia 7861
- Songwriter: Tony Hazzard
- Producer: Mickie Most

Herman's Hermits singles chronology
"A Must to Avoid" (1965)	"You Won't Be Leaving" (1966)	"This Door Swings Both Ways" (1966)

"You Won't Be Leaving" is a song written by Tony Hazzard and performed by Herman's Hermits. It reached #9 in Australia and #20 in the UK in 1966. It was featured on their 1967 album, There's a Kind of Hush All Over the World. The song was not released as a single in the United States, but rather the B-side to "You Won't Be Leaving", "Listen People", was released as the US single.

The song was produced by Mickie Most.

== Other versions ==
- The song's writer, Hazzard, also released a version of the song on his 1969 album, Tony Hazzard Sings Tony Hazzard.
- Estonian pop group Optimistid made their version as early as 1967. Translated by named lyricist Heldur Karmo, it was titled "Kesköötund (Mul on tunne)" ("The Midnight Hour (I've got a feeling))". 1983 the version was covered by a group called Rock Hotel (which consists of 3 members of Optimistid).
- Liverpool band The Four Originals (who had evolved out of Dale Roberts and the Jaywalkers) recorded the song in 1966. Their version was released on the Viper label's CD “Unearthed Merseybeat Vol.3” in 2005.
