= My Sentimental Friend =

Single by Herman's Hermits
- B-side: "My Lady"
- Released: 11 April 1969 (UK); June 1969 (US)
- Recorded: De Lane Lea Studios, London, October 1968
- Genre: Pop rock
- Length: 3:20
- Label: MGM 14060
- Songwriters: Geoff Stephens, John Carter
- Producer: Mickie Most

Herman's Hermits singles chronology
"Something's Happening" (1968)	"My Sentimental Friend" (1969)	"Here Comes the Star" (1969)

"My Sentimental Friend" is a song written by Geoff Stephens and John Carter and performed by Herman's Hermits. The song is Herman's Hermits' second highest charting song in the UK, reaching No. 2 in the UK chart. It also reached No. 2 in Ireland, No. 3 in Australia, No. 6 in New Zealand, and No. 1 in South Africa.

The song was produced by Mickie Most.

The Belgian Liliane Saint-Pierre singer recorded it in French with the title "Chanson sentimentale pour une fille sentimentale". The song reached in No. 24 in the Ultratop in Belgium.

== Critical reception ==
John Quinn of The Evening Times wrote that he felt the single was "not strong enough, in my opinion, to make much of a splash". Billboard highlighted the single in its Special Merit Spotlight section, describing it as "[r]eminiscent of the Hermits' past hits".

== Charts ==
Chart (1969)	Peak position
Australia (Go-Set)	3
Ireland (IRMA)	2
New Zealand (Listener Chart)	6
South Africa	1
UK Singles (Official Charts)	2
West Germany (GfK)	36
