= Years May Come, Years May Go =

Single by Herman's Hermits
- B-side: "Smile Please"
- Released: 23 January 1970
- Recorded: January 3–31, 1969
- Studio: De Lane Lea Studios, London
- Genre: Pop rock
- Length: 3:37
- Label: Columbia
- Songwriter(s): André Popp, Jack Fishman
- Producer(s): Mickie Most

Herman's Hermits singles chronology
"Here Comes the Star" (1969)	"Years May Come, Years May Go" (1970)	"Bet Yer Life I Do" (1970)

"Years May Come, Years May Go" is a song written by André Popp and Jack Fishman and performed by Herman's Hermits. It reached No. 7 on the UK Singles Chart and No. 31 on the Kent Music Report in 1970.

The song was produced by Mickie Most.

== Other versions ==
The Irish Rovers released a version in 1970 that reached No. 92 on the RPM chart in Canada. It was included on their 1971 album, On the Shores of Americay.
