= Don't Go Out into the Rain (You're Going to Melt) =

Single by Herman's Hermits

from the album Blaze
- B-side: "Moonshine Man"
- Released: June 1967 (US); 7 July 1967 (UK)
- Recorded: De Lane Lea Studios, London, 26 May 1967
- Genre: Folk rock
- Length: 2:12
- Songwriter: Kenny Young
- Producer: Mickie Most

Herman's Hermits singles chronology
"There's a Kind of Hush" (1967)	"Don't Go Out into the Rain (You're Going to Melt)" (1967)	"Museum" (1967)

"Don't Go Out into the Rain (You're Going to Melt)" is a 1966 song. The song was written by Brill Building songsmith Kenny Young who himself made the original recording of the song – as "Don't Go Out into the Rain (You're Gonna Melt)" – leading a session group credited as the Seagulls. This version broke in the Miami area in December 1966 and was consequently picked up for national release by Date Records failing to garner enough regional attention to reach the Billboard Hot 100.

== Herman's Hermits recording ==
"Don't Go Out into the Rain (You're Going to Melt)" was a 1967 hit single by Herman's Hermits. The group - who had scored a 1965 hit with Kenny Young's "Just a Little Bit Better" – recorded "Don't Go Out into the Rain (You're Going to Melt)" for single release in June 1967; the follow-up to the million-seller "There's a Kind of Hush", "Don't Go Out into the Rain..." just reached the Top 20 on the Billboard Hot 100 with a peak of No. 18. A somewhat minor hit in Australia - with a chart peak of no.39 - the Herman's Hermits version of "Don't Go Out into the Rain..." was not released as a single in the UK.

== Other versions ==
- Two UK acts had local single releases of the song in 1967: The Swinging Blue Jeans in August and David Garrick in September, with the respective titles of these versions being "Don't Go Out into the Rain (You're Gonna Melt)" and "Don't Go Out into the Rain (You're Gonna Melt, Sugar)". Garrick's version was produced by John Schroeder for Schroeder's Picadilly label - a Pye records subsidiary - with Alan Tew conducting and arranging the recording session. Although neither version reached the UK Singles Chart, Garrick was afforded a European hit with his version which, in early 1968, charted in Germany (No. 26) and the Netherlands (No. 22). In Malaysia, Garrick's "Don't Go Out into the Rain..." single rose as high as No. 4 in February 1968, although it was then superseded by the Swinging Blue Jeans' version which reached No. 1.
- The song was also recorded in 1967 by Finnish singer Johnny – as "Älä Pelkää, En Sua Syö".
- The song was recorded in Swedish as "Du ska bara tro på hälften" by the Hootenanny Singers
- Swedish group the Fabulous Four also recorded the song in its original English [1967].
- In 1967, Les Sinners, a group from Quebec, recorded a French cover "Ne reste pas sous la pluie".
- The Groovie Ghoulies remade "Don't Go Out into the Rain" for their 1989 album Appetite for Adrenochrome.
