= Sunshine Girl (Herman's Hermits song) =

Single by Herman's Hermits
- B-side: "Nobody Needs to Know"
- Released: July 1968 (UK); August 1968 (US)
- Recorded: De Lane Lea Studios, London, 24 May 1968
- Genre: Pop rock
- Length: 2:34
- Label: MGM
- Songwriters: Geoff Stephens, John Carter
- Producer: Mickie Most

Herman's Hermits singles chronology
"Sleepy Joe" (1968)	"Sunshine Girl" (1968)	"The Most Beautiful Thing in My Life" (1968)

"Sunshine Girl" is a song written by Geoff Stephens and John Carter and performed by Herman's Hermits. The single reached number eight in the United Kingdom.

The song was produced by Mickie Most.

== Critical reception ==
Billboard described "Sunshine Girl" as a "blockbuster rhythm number" and noted it was the group's "best in some time". Record World said that "it's sunny and melodic and infectious fun."

== Charts ==
Chart (1968)	Peak position
Australia (Kent Music Report)	56
Canada (The RPM 100)	68
New Zealand (Official New Zealand Music Chart)	9
Norway (VG-lista)	6
UK (Record Retailer)	8
US Billboard Bubbling Under the Hot 100	101
