= There's a Kind of Hush =

1967 single by Herman's Hermits

Single by Herman's Hermits

from the album There's a Kind of Hush All Over the World
- B-side: "Gaslight Street" (UK); "No Milk Today" (US)
- Released: January 1967 (US); 3 February 1967 (UK)
- Recorded: 7 December 1966
- Studio: De Lane Lea Studios, London
- Genre: Pop
- Length: 2:31
- Label: MGM (US); Columbia (UK)
- Songwriters: Geoff Stephens; Les Reed
- Producer: Mickie Most

Herman's Hermits singles chronology
"East West" (1966)	"There's a Kind of Hush" (1967)	"Don't Go Out into the Rain (You're Going to Melt)" (1967)

"There's a Kind of Hush" is a popular song written by Les Reed and Geoff Stephens. Originally recorded by Stephens' group the New Vaudeville Band in 1967 as a neo-British music hall number, this version of the track became a hit in Australia and South Africa. However, in the rest of the world, a near-simultaneous cover was a big hit for Herman's Hermits. The song was later a hit in 1976 for the Carpenters.

== First recordings ==
The song was introduced on the 1966 album Winchester Cathedral by Geoff Stephens' group the New Vaudeville Band; like that group's hit "Winchester Cathedral", "There's a Kind of Hush" was conceived as a neo-British music hall number although it is a less overt example of that style. The first single version of "There's a Kind of Hush" was recorded in 1966 by Gary and the Hornets, a teen/pre-teen male band from Franklin, Ohio whose version—entitled "Kind of Hush" produced by Lou Reizner—became a regional success and showed signs of breaking nationally in January 1967; the single would reach No. 4 in Cincinnati and No. 3 in Erie PA.

However an expedient cover by British Invasion group Herman's Hermits was released in the US in January 1967 to reach the Top 30 of the Billboard Hot 100 in three weeks and proceeded to a peak of #4—affording the group their final US Top Ten hit—with Gold certification for US sales of one million units awarded that April. The record notched two positions higher on the Silver Dollar Survey for 3–10 March 1967 on WLS, for an overall rank of #26 for 1967, and topped the Boss 30 for 8–22 March 1967 on KHJ. In the UK Herman's Hermits' "There's a Kind of Hush" would reach No. 7. The success of the Herman's Hermits version led to the release of the original New Vaudeville Band track as a single in some territories with both of these versions charting in Australia with peaks of No. 5 (Herman's Hermits) and No. 12 (New Vaudeville Band) and also in South Africa where the New Vaudeville Band bested the Herman's Hermits' No. 9 peak by reaching No. 4.

== Chart performance ==
=== Weekly charts ===
Chart (1967)	Peak position
Australia	5
Austria	19
Belgium	16
Canada (RPM) Top Singles	2
France	21
Germany	26
Ireland	7
Malta	2
Netherlands (Dutch Top 40)	15
New Zealand (Official New Zealand Music Chart)	10
Singapore	2
South Africa	9
UK Singles Chart	7
US Billboard Hot 100	4
US Cash Box Top 100	3

=== Year-end charts ===
Chart (1967)	Rank
Canada	22
UK	77
US Billboard Hot 100	50
US Billboard Easy Listening	10
US Cash Box	35

== Carpenters version ==
"There's a Kind of Hush (All over the World)"
- Cover to the Carpenters' single, "There's a Kind of Hush (All over the World)"

Single by Carpenters

from the album A Kind of Hush
- B-side: "(I'm Caught Between) Goodbye and I Love You"
- Released: 12 February 1976
- Recorded: December 1975
- Genre: Pop
- Length: 2:57
- Label: A&M
- Songwriters: Geoff Stephens; Les Reed
- Producer: Richard Carpenter

Carpenters singles chronology
"Solitaire" (1975)	"There's a Kind of Hush (All over the World)" (1976)	"I Need to Be in Love" (1976)

The Carpenters remade "There's a Kind of Hush"—as "There's a Kind of Hush (All Over the World)"—for their 1976 album release A Kind of Hush for which it served as lead single, reaching No. 12 on the Billboard Hot 100 chart and affording the Carpenters' their thirteenth No. 1 on the easy listening chart.

The Carpenters' version has a notable country pop feel, but was not particularly successful for their usual standard in that time. It was the first lead single from a mainstream Carpenters' album to fall short of the Top 5 since "Ticket to Ride" from the group's 1969 debut album Offering, while the No. 33 chart peak of the A Kind of Hush album afforded the Carpenters' their first Top 20 shortfall since Offering (Horizon would prove to be their last album to reach the top 20 in the United States). "There's a Kind of Hush" would remain the Carpenters' final top twenty hit until 1981's "Touch Me When We're Dancing".

Richard Carpenter explained in the liner notes to the Carpenters' 2004 best-of compilation, Gold, that although he and Karen loved the song, he was not particularly pleased with how their remake turned out:

...one of Karen's and my favorite songs from the '60s. In hindsight, however, even though our version was a hit, I wish we'd never recorded it. Here are three reasons why: (1) The original was, and is, perfectly fine. (2) Our foray into the oldies should have ended with the medley featured on side 2 of Now & Then, 1973. (3) The use of a synthesizer in some of our recordings has not worn well with me, on this track, or just about any other track on which I used it.

=== Chart performance ===
==== Weekly charts ====
Chart (1976)	Peak position
Australia	33
Canada RPM Top Singles	8
Canada RPM Adult Contemporary	1
Quebec (ADISQ)	10
Ireland (IRMA)	7
Japan	27
New Zealand	5
UK	22
US Billboard Hot 100	12
US Adult Contemporary (Billboard)	1
US Cashbox Radio Active Airplay Singles	1
US Cash Box Top 100	12

==== Year-end charts ====
Chart (1976)	Rank
Canada	95
New Zealand	46
U.S. (Joel Whitburn's Pop Annual)	108
U.S. Billboard Easy Listening	10

=== Personnel ===
- Karen Carpenter – lead vocals and backing vocals
- Richard Carpenter – backing vocals, Wurlitzer electronic piano, Fender Rhodes electric piano, ARP Odyssey, orchestration
- Joe Osborn – bass guitar
- Tony Peluso – guitar
- Jim Gordon – drums
- Bob Messenger – tenor saxophone
- Lenny Castro – percussion

== See also ==
- List of number-one adult contemporary singles of 1976 (U.S.)
