= I Can Take or Leave Your Loving =

Single by Herman's Hermits
- B-side: "Marcel's"
- Released: 29 December 1967 (UK); December 1967 (US)
- Recorded: De Lane Lea Studios, London, 8 December 1967
- Genre: Pop rock
- Length: 2:30
- Label: MGM 13885
- Songwriter(s): Rick Jones
- Producer(s): Mickie Most

Herman's Hermits singles chronology
"Museum" (1967)	"I Can Take or Leave Your Loving" (1967)	"Sleepy Joe" (1968)

"I Can Take or Leave Your Loving" is a song written by Tony Macaulay and John Macleod which was written for and originally recorded by The Foundations and it was issued as the B side of their 1968 release "Back on My Feet Again". It was heard on the radio by Mickie Most who recognised its A side potential and quickly cut it with Herman's Hermits (although only Peter Noone from the group appeared on the record.)

== Chart performance ==
It reached No. 1 in Canada, #11 in United Kingdom, #19 in New Zealand, #22 in the United States, and #37 in Australia in 1968.
