= This Door Swings Both Ways =

Single by Herman's Hermits

from the album Both Sides of Herman's Hermits
- B-side: "For Love"
- Released: June 1966
- Recorded: 27 May 1966
- Studio: De Lane Lea, London
- Genre: Pop rock
- Length: 2:05
- Label: MGM
- Songwriter(s): Estelle Levitt, Don Thomas
- Producer(s): Mickie Most

Herman's Hermits singles chronology
| "Listen People" / "You Won't Be Leaving" (1966) | "This Door Swings Both Ways" (1966) | "Dandy" / "No Milk Today" (1966) |

"This Door Swings Both Ways" is a song written by Estelle Levitt and Don Thomas and performed by Herman's Hermits. It reached #3 in Canada, #8 in New Zealand, #12 in the United States, #18 in the United Kingdom, and #38 in Australia in 1966. It was featured on their 1966 album, Both Sides of Herman's Hermits.

The song was produced by Mickie Most.

Billboard described the single as an "easy-go rocker with unique instrumental backing and exceptional group vocal."
