= Listen People =

Single by Herman's Hermits
- B-side: "Got a Feeling"
- Released: February 1966 (US); 11 March 1966 (UK)
- Recorded: 16 July 1965
- Studio: De Lane Lea, London
- Genre: Pop rock
- Length: 2:31
- Label: MGM
- Songwriter(s): Graham Gouldman
- Producer(s): Mickie Most

Herman's Hermits singles chronology
"A Must to Avoid" (1965)	"Listen People" (1966)	"This Door Swings Both Ways" (1966)

"Listen People" is a song written by Graham Gouldman and performed by Herman's Hermits. The song was produced by Mickie Most. It was featured on their 1966 album, Volume 2: The Best of Herman's Hermits. It reached #1 in Canada, #3 on both the Billboard Hot 100 and Australian charts, and #7 on both the New Zealand and Swedish charts in 1966. The song was also released in the United Kingdom as the B-side to their 1966 single, "You Won't Be Leaving".

== Background ==
The theme is based on the traditional hymn "Jesus Let Us Come to Know You."

== Other versions ==
- The Outsiders released a version of the song on their 1966 album, Time Won't Let Me.
- A Chinese Mandarin version titled 心事無從說起 was covered by Singaporean female singer Sakura Teng (櫻花) in 1966.

== Popular culture ==
The Herman's Hermits version was featured in the 1965 film, When the Boys Meet the Girls and is on the film's soundtrack.
