= The Very Best of Herman's Hermits =

Greatest hits album by Herman's Hermits
- Released: 1984
- Genre: Pop, rock
- Label: EMI/Music for Pleasure

Herman's Hermits chronology
The Most of Herman's Hermits Volume 2 (1972)	The Very Best of Herman's Hermits (1984)	Into Something Good: The Mickie Most Years 1964–72 (2008)

The Very Best of Herman's Hermits is the name of a greatest hits album released in the U.K. by EMI Records' budget label Music For Pleasure for Herman's Hermits in 1984. The album's final track on Side 2, the cover version of David Bowie's "Oh You Pretty Things" is not Herman's Hermits but Peter Noone solo from 1971. EMI licensed the song for this LP from RAK Records. The cover uses the same photograph as earlier MFP compilation The Most of Herman's Hermits. It was rated 4.5 stars by AllMusic.

== Track listing ==
Side 1

1. "I'm into Something Good" (Gerry Goffin, Carole King) - 2:39
2. "Silhouettes" (Frank Slay, Bob Crewe) - 1:59
3. "Can't You Hear My Heartbeat" (Carter, Lewis) - 2:16
4. "Wonderful World" (Barbara Campbell, Herb Alpert, Lou Adler, Sam Cooke) - 1:58
5. "Leaning on the Lamp Post" (Gay) - 2:43
6. "A Must to Avoid" (Sloan, Barri) - 1:59
7. "No Milk Today" (Graham Gouldman) - 2:58
8. "Years May Come, Years May Go" (Popp, Fishman) - 3:38

Side 2

1. "I'm Henry the Eighth, I Am" (Murray, Weston) - 1:49
2. "There's a Kind of Hush All Over the World" (Geoff Stephens, Les Reed) - 2:33
3. "Dandy" (Ray Davies) - 2:03
4. "Sunshine Girl" (Stephens, Carter) - 2:36
5. "Something's Happening" (Fred Murray, Weston) - 3:13
6. "Mrs. Brown, You've Got a Lovely Daughter" (Peacock) (Arr. by John Paul Jones) - 2:48
7. "My Sentimental Friend" (Stephens, Carter) - 3:16
8. "Oh You Pretty Things" (David Bowie) - 3:04
