= The Best of Herman's Hermits =

Greatest hits album by Herman's Hermits
- Released: November 1965
- Genre: Pop
- Length: 25:42
- Label: MGM
- Producer: Mickie Most

Herman's Hermits chronology
Herman's Hermits Hits (1965)	The Best of Herman's Hermits (1965)	A Must to Avoid (1966)

Singles from The Best of Herman's Hermits
- 1. "Wonderful World" Released: 16 April 1965 (UK) May 1965 (US); 2. "Just a Little Bit Better" Released: 27 August 1965 (UK) September 1965 (US)

The Best of Herman's Hermits is the first compilation album by the English rock band Herman's Hermits, released in November 1965 by MGM Records.

== Release and promotion ==
The Best of Herman's Hermits was released in November 1965 by MGM Records, and contains most of the band's biggest hits, as well as two new recordings, a cover of Sam Cooke's "Wonderful World", and "Just a Little Bit Better". In the liner notes of the album, June Harris wrote that the band "illustrate the good taste of the group in their choice of material" in the eleven selections on the album.

== Reception ==
Professional ratings
Review scores
Source	Rating
AllMusic	4.5/5 stars
The Encyclopedia of Popular Music	3/5 stars

Writing for AllMusic, William Ruhlmann opined that "the music was well-produced by Mickie Most, and it remains entertaining, if sometimes precious." Billboard's writers gave it a positive review in the 20 November 1965 issue of the magazine. Cash Box wrote the band "have a powerhouse commercial outing with this collection of their biggest hit singles", noting "the British quintet take a long step toward completely satisfying their innumerable fans’ desires. The LP should be one of the boys’ biggest."

== Track listing ==
Side one
No.	Title	Writer(s)	Original release	Length
1.	"I'm Henery the Eighth, I Am"	Fred Murray; Robert Patrick Weston	Herman's Hermits (UK) (1965); Herman's Hermits on Tour (US/Canada) (1965)	1:49
2.	"Mrs. Brown, You've Got a Lovely Daughter"	Trevor Peacock	Herman's Hermits	2:46
3.	"Mother-in-Law"	Allen Toussaint	Herman's Hermits	2:21
4.	"I'm into Something Good"	Gerry Goffin (lyrics); Carole King (music)	Herman's Hermits	2:31
5.	"Silhouettes"	Bob Crewe; Frank Slay	Herman's Hermits on Tour	1:57
Total length:				12:51

Side two
No.	Title	Writer(s)	Original release	Length
1.	"Just a Little Bit Better"	Kenny Young	New song	2:57
2.	"Can't You Hear My Heartbeat"	John Carter; Ken Lewis	Herman's Hermits on Tour	2:15
3.	"The End of the World"	Arthur Kent; Sylvia Dee	b-side to "I'm Henery the Eighth, I Am"	2:57
4.	"Sea Cruise"	Huey "Piano" Smith	Herman's Hermits	2:08
5.	"I Gotta Dream On"	Gary Gordon	Herman's Hermits	2:04
6.	"Wonderful World"	Lou Adler; Herb Alpert; Sam Cooke	New song	1:57
Total length:				25:42

== Charts and certifications ==
=== Charts ===
Chart performance for The Best of Herman's Hermits
Chart (1965)	Peak position
Canada Top Albums (RPM)	14
US Billboard 200	5
US Record World Top 100 LPs	4

=== Certifications and sales ===
Region	Certification	Certified units/sales
United States (RIAA)	Gold	500,000^{^}
^{^} Shipments figures based on certification alone.
