= Blaze (Herman's Hermits album) =

- Back cover

Studio album by Herman's Hermits
- Released: September 1967
- Studio: De Lane Lea Studios, London
- Genre: Pop
- Length: 23:18 on original US release
- Label: MGM (US); Columbia (UK) (export sales only)
- Producer: Mickie Most

Herman's Hermits American chronology
There's a Kind of Hush All Over the World (1967)	Blaze (1967)	Mrs. Brown, You've Got a Lovely Daughter (1968)

Professional ratings
Review scores
Source	Rating
AllMusic	4/5 stars

Blaze is the sixth US album by the English pop rock group Herman's Hermits. It was released in September 1967 by MGM Records.

== Background ==
Peter Cowap, who wrote two tracks on Blaze, later became the lead vocalist of Herman's Hermits for a brief period following Peter Noone's departure from the group.

== Critical reception ==
Al Campbell of AllMusic described the album as "an unappreciated pop gasp". In the 2005 book Lost in the Grooves: Scram's Capricious Guide to the Music You Missed, Michael Lynch praised the album and wrote, "The end result proved Herman's Hermits capable of moving forward without selling out."

== Track listing ==
Side one
No.	Title	Writer(s)	Length
1.	"Museum"	Donovan Leitch	2:42
2.	"Upstairs, Downstairs"	Graham Gouldman	2:12
3.	"Busy Line"	Karl Green, Keith Hopwood, Derek Leckenby	2:30
4.	"Moonshine Man"	Green, Hopwood, Leckenby	2:32
5.	"Green Street Green"	Geoff Stephens	2:13

Side two
No.	Title	Writer(s)	Length
1.	"Don't Go Out Into the Rain (You're Going to Melt)"	Kenny Young	2:13
2.	"I Call Out Her Name"	Green, Hopwood, Leckenby	1:52
3.	"One Little Packet of Cigarettes"	John Carter, Geoff Stephens	2:00
4.	"Last Bus Home"	Peter Cowap	2:19
5.	"Ace, King, Queen, Jack"	Peter Cowap, Peter Noone	2:49

Bonus Tracks (2001 Repertoire Release)

11. "Sleepy Joe" (Russell Alquist, Carter)
12. "Just One Girl" (John Paul Jones, Adrian Love)
13. "London Look" (Gouldman)
14. "Sunshine Girl" (Carter, Stephens)
15. "Nobody Needs to Know" (Roger Brook, Hopwood, Leckenby)
16. "Something's Happening" (Giancarlo Bigazzi, Riccardo Del Turco, Jack Fishman)
17. "The Most Beautiful Thing in My Life" (K. Young)
18. "Ooh, She's Done It Again" (Gouldman)
19. "My Sentimental Friend" (Carter, Stephens)
20. "My Lady" (David Most, Noone)
21. "Here Comes the Star" (Johnny Young)
22. "It's Alright Now" (Gouldman, Most, Noone)

=== New Zealand version ===
Side 1

1. "Sleepy Joe" (Russell Alquist, John Carter)
2. "Museum" (Donovan Leitch)
3. "Upstairs, Downstairs" (Graham Gouldman)
4. "Busy Line" (Karl Green, Keith Hopwood, Derek Leckenby)
5. "Moonshine Man" (Green, Hopwood, Leckenby)
6. "Green Street Green" (Geoff Stephens)

Side 2

1. "I Can't Take or Leave Your Loving" (Rick Jones)
2. "Don't Go Out Into the Rain (You're Going To Melt)" (Kenny Young)
3. "I Call Out Her Name" (Green, Hopwood, Leckenby)
4. "One Little Packet of Cigarettes" (Carter, Stephens)
5. "Last Bus Home" (Peter Cowap)
6. "Ace, King, Queen, Jack" (Cowap, Peter Noone)

== Charts ==
Chart performance for Blaze
Chart (1967)	Peak position
US Billboard Top LPs	75
US Cashbox Album Charts	34
