= The Most of Herman's Hermits Volume 2 =

Greatest hits album by Herman's Hermits
- Released: 1972
- Genres: Pop, rock
- Label: EMI/Music for Pleasure
- Producer: Mickie Most

Herman's Hermits chronology
The Most of Herman's Hermits (1971)	The Most of Herman's Hermits Volume 2 (1972)	The Very Best of Herman's Hermits (1984)

The Most of Herman's Hermits Volume 2 is a greatest hits album (although it contained only three UK singles) released in the U.K. by EMI Records' budget label Music For Pleasure for Herman's Hermits in 1972.

== Track listing ==
1. "A Must to Avoid" (Phil Sloan, Steve Barri) - 1:59
2. "Silhouettes" (Bob Crewe, Frank Slay, Jr.) - 1:59
3. "Saturday's Child" (David Gates) - 2:38
4. "If You're Thinking What I'm Thinking" (Tommy Boyce, Bobby Hart) - 2:24
5. "Jezebel" (Wayne Shanklin, Charles Aznavour) - 3:23
6. "Little Miss Sorrow, Child of Tomorrow" (Bruce Woodley) - 2:34
7. "My Sentimental Friend" (Geoff Stephens, John Carter) - 3:16
8. "Lemon and Lime" (Graham Gouldman)
9. "Smile Please" (Albert King, Mickie Most, Peter Noone) - 2:41
10. "It's Nice to Be Out in the Morning" (Graham Gouldman)
11. "Gaslite Street" (Derek Leckenby, Keith Hopwood) - 2:34
12. "Rattler" (Bruce Woodley) - 3:13
