= Mrs. Brown, You've Got a Lovely Daughter (disambiguation) =

"Mrs. Brown, You've Got a Lovely Daughter" is a song written by Trevor Peacock and made famous by Herman's Hermits in 1965.

Mrs. Brown, You've Got a Lovely Daughter may also refer to:

- Mrs. Brown, You've Got a Lovely Daughter (album), 1968 album by Herman's Hermits
- Mrs. Brown, You've Got a Lovely Daughter (EP), 1965 EP by Herman's Hermits
- Mrs. Brown, You've Got a Lovely Daughter (film), 1968 film featuring Herman's Hermits
