= Herman's Hermits (album) =

1965 debut album by Herman's Hermits

Studio album by Herman's Hermits
- Released: 13 February 1965 (US); September 1965 (UK)
- Recorded: 1964
- Studios: Kingsway (London, UK)
- Genres: Beat, pop
- Length: 30:13 (UK release)
- Labels: MGM (US); Columbia (UK)
- Producer: Mickie Most

Herman's Hermits British chronology
Hermania (1965)	Herman's Hermits (1965)	Mrs. Brown, You've Got a Lovely Daughter (1965)

Herman's Hermits American chronology
Herman's Hermits (1965)	Herman's Hermits on Tour (1965)

Singles from Herman's Hermits (US only)
- 1. "I'm into Something Good" Released: September 1964; 2. "Mrs. Brown You've Got a Lovely Daughter" Released: April 1965

Herman's Hermits (sometimes called Introducing Herman's Hermits) is the debut album of the band Herman's Hermits, first issued in 1965. As was typical of the time, the album's contents were different on the UK and US releases. UK albums tended not to include singles. The US edition of the album is sometimes called Introducing Herman's Hermits – a title used on the back cover and the record label but not on the front cover.

== Background ==
The success of Herman's Hermits' first single "I'm into Something Good" – a number one in the UK and no. 13 on the US Billboard Hot 100 – led to the US release of their first album in February 1965. In April 1965, with both "Can't You Hear My Heartbeat" and the Hermits' cover of "Silhouettes" simultaneously in the singles charts – both would appear on the band's second US album Herman's Hermits on Tour – MGM released "Mrs. Brown You've Got a Lovely Daughter". The single's no. 12 debut on the Hot 100 was the decade's third highest (behind the Beatles’ "Hey Jude" and "Get Back"), and it took just three weeks to reach number one. The album climbed to no. 2 on the Billboard album chart in the week in which the Hermits had three singles in the national Top 20. The LP then spent four consecutive weeks at no. 2, three of them overlapping with the three-week run of "Mrs. Brown" at number one on the singles chart. The album, which failed to get to number one because of the soundtrack to the 1964 film Mary Poppins, remained on the chart for 40 weeks. On 31 August 1965, the album was certified Gold by the RIAA.

The album was not released in the UK until September 1965. The UK version – which featured both "Mrs. Brown You've Got a Lovely Daughter" and "I'm Henery VIII, I Am" (with spelling variation) – peaked at no. 16 and spent just two weeks on the chart.

== Reception ==
Professional ratings
Review scores
Source	Rating
AllMusic	3.5/5 stars
Record Mirror	4/5 stars
Uncut	2/5 stars

In his retrospective review of the album's release, Richie Unterberger for AllMusic gave the album a modest response by saying, "Since those are the first songs on the album, it's a letdown thereafter, since the oldies aren't very creative or (in comparison to the better British Invasion groups) forcefully performed, and the pop numbers sound like filler Merseybeat."

== Album covers ==
There are three different covers for the US album. Original covers indicate "Including Their Hit Single 'I'm into Something Good'". When "Mrs. Brown You've Got a Lovely Daughter" was issued as a single, a yellow sticker was added to the cover, incorrectly reading "Featuring 'Mrs. Brown You Have a Lovely Daughter'". Once the latter became a no. 1 hit, the sticker was eliminated and the cover was changed to read, with correct title, "Including 'Mrs. Brown You've Got a Lovely Daughter".

== Track listing ==
=== UK version ===
Side one
No.	Title	Writer(s)	Length
1.	"Heartbeat"	Bob Montgomery, Norman Petty	2:52
2.	"Travellin' Light"	Roy C. Bennett, Sid Tepper	2:36
3.	"I'll Never Dance Again"	Mike Anthony, Barry Mann	3:30
4.	"Walkin' with My Angel"	Gerry Goffin, Carole King	2:24
5.	"(I Gotta) Dream On"	Gary Gordon	2:07
6.	"I Wonder"	Richard Pearson	2:10

Side two
No.	Title	Writer(s)	Length
1.	"For Your Love"	Graham Gouldman	2:28
2.	"Don't Try to Hurt Me"	Keith Hopwood	2:08
3.	"Tell Me Baby"	Hopwood, Derek Leckenby	2:16
4.	"I'm Henery VIII, I Am"	Fred Murray, Robert Patrick Weston	1:53
5.	"The End of the World"	Arthur Kent, Sylvia Dee	3:05
6.	"Mrs. Brown You've Got a Lovely Daughter"	Trevor Peacock	2:48

=== US version ===
Side one
No.	Title	Writer(s)	Length
1.	"I'm into Something Good"	Gerry Goffin, Carole King	2:31
2.	"Mrs. Brown You've Got a Lovely Daughter"	Trevor Peacock	2:46
3.	"Kansas City Loving"	Jerry Leiber and Mike Stoller	2:07
4.	"I Wonder"	Richard Pearson	2:06
5.	"Sea Cruise"	Huey "Piano" Smith	2:08
6.	"Walkin' with My Angel"	Goffin, King	2:19

Side two
No.	Title	Writer(s)	Length
1.	"Show Me Girl"	Goffin, King	2:34
2.	"I Understand (Just How You Feel)"	Pat Best	2:58
3.	"Mother-in-Law"	Allen Toussaint	2:21
4.	"Your Hand in Mine"	Harvey Lisberg, Charles Silverman	2:00
5.	"I Know Why"	Derek Leckenby, Silverman	2:03
6.	"Thinking of You"	Pearson, John Wright	2:03

== Personnel ==
=== Herman's Hermits ===
- Peter Noone – vocals
- Derek Leckenby – lead guitar
- Keith Hopwood – rhythm guitar
- Karl Green – bass
- Barry Whitwam – drums

=== Technical ===
- Mickie Most – producer
- Val Valentin – engineer

== Charts ==
Chart performance for Introducing Herman's Hermits
Chart (1965)	Peak position
US Billboard Top LPs	2
US Cashbox Album Charts	2
