= The Most of Herman's Hermits =

Greatest hits album by Herman's Hermits
- Released: 1971
- Genre: Pop
- Length: 31:28
- Label: EMI/Music for Pleasure
- Producer: Mickie Most

Herman's Hermits chronology
Mrs. Brown, You've Got a Lovely Daughter (1968)	The Most of Herman's Hermits (1971)	The Most of Herman's Hermits Volume 2 (1972)

The Most of Herman's Hermits is the name of a greatest hits album released in the U.K. by EMI Records' budget label Music For Pleasure for Herman's Hermits in 1971. The title refers to the producer Mickie Most and was first used for The Most of The Animals in 1966 (a new version of that album was also released on MFP in 1971). This album became the band's highest charting UK album, reaching #14.

== Track listing ==
1. "Years May Come, Years May Go" (Andre Popp, Jack Fishman) - 3:42
2. "There's a Kind of Hush All Over the World" - (Les Reed, Geoff Stephens) - 2:35
3. "I'm into Something Good" (Gerry Goffin, Carole King) - 2:39
4. "No Milk Today" (Graham Gouldman) - 2:58
5. "Mrs. Brown, You've Got a Lovely Daughter" (Trevor Peacock) - 2:48
6. "I'm Henry the Eighth, I Am" (P. F. Weston, Fred Murray) - 1:49
7. "You Won't Be Leaving" (Tony Hazzard) - 2:22
8. "Leaning on the Lamp Post" (Noel Gay) - 2:43
9. "The Most Beautiful Thing In My Life" (Kenny Young) - 2:18
10. "Dandy" (Ray Davies) - 2:03
11. "Sea Cruise" (Huey "Piano" Smith) - 2:08
12. "Here Comes the Star" (JOHN B. YOUNG) - 3:23

== Chart performance ==
Chart (1971)	Peak position
UK Albums (OCC)	14
