= Mrs. Brown, You've Got a Lovely Daughter (album) =

1968 album by Herman's Hermits

Soundtrack album by Herman's Hermits
- Released: August 1968 (UK); September 1968 (US)
- Length: 24:37 on original release
- Label: MGM (US); Columbia (UK)
- Producer: Mickie Most

Herman's Hermits British chronology
There's a Kind of Hush All Over the World (1967)	Mrs. Brown, You've Got a Lovely Daughter (1968)	The Most of Herman's Hermits (1971)

Herman's Hermits American chronology
Blaze (1967)	Mrs. Brown, You've Got a Lovely Daughter (1968)	Herman's Hermits XX (Their Greatest Hits) (1973)

Professional ratings
Review scores
Source	Rating
AllMusic	2/5 stars

Mrs. Brown, You've Got a Lovely Daughter is the fourth UK and seventh US album by the English pop rock group Herman's Hermits. It was released in the UK in August 1968 and in the US in September 1968, and was the soundtrack to their film of the same name. The album reached number 182 on the Billboard Top LPs chart. On 17 May 2011, ABKCO Records reissued the album on CD combined with the soundtrack to Herman's Hermits' film Hold On!.

== Track listing ==
Side one
No.	Title	Writer(s)	Length
1.	"It's Nice to Be Out in the Morning"	Graham Gouldman	2:26
2.	"Holiday Inn"	Geoff Stephens	2:23
3.	"Ooh, She's Done It Again"	Gouldman	2:17
4.	"There's a Kind of Hush (All Over the World)"	Les Reed, Stephens	2:35
5.	"Lemon and Lime" (Vocals by Stanley Holloway, Derek Leckenby, Keith Hopwood, Barry Whitwam, Karl Green and Peter Noone)	Gouldman	2:44

Side two
No.	Title	Writer(s)	Length
1.	"The Most Beautiful Thing in My Life"	Kenny Young	1:54
2.	"Daisy Chain Part 1"	Keith Hopwood, Derek Leckenby	2:50
3.	"Daisy Chain Part 2"	Hopwood, Leckenby	1:59
4.	"The World Is for the Young" (Vocals by Marjorie Rhodes, Sheila White, Stanley Holloway and Mona Washbourne)	Gouldman	2:44
5.	"Mrs. Brown, You've Got a Lovely Daughter"	Trevor Peacock	2:48

2000 Repertoire Records CD reissue bonus tracks
No.	Title	Writer(s)	Length
11.	"Regardez-Moi (Here Comes the Star)" (French non-album single, 1969)	Johnny Young	3:21
12.	"Years May Come, Years May Go" (Non-album single, 1970)	Jack Fishman, Jean-Claude Massoulier, André Popp	3:38
13.	"Smile Please" (B-side, 1970)	Anthony King, David Most, Peter Noone	2:42
14.	"Bet Yer Life I Do" (Non-album single, 1970)	Errol Brown, Tony Wilson	2:37
15.	"Searching for the Southern Sun (B-side, 1970)"	Karl Green, Hopwood, Leckenby	2:41
16.	"Lady Barbara" (Non-album single, 1970)	Giancarlo Bigazzi, Brown, Gaetano Savio, Wilson	3:43
17.	"Don't Just Stand There" (B-side, 1970)	King, Most, Noone, Harold Spiro	3:43
18.	"Big Man" (From the 1967 US album The Best of Herman's Hermits-Volume III)	Bruce Belland, Glen Larson	2:20
19.	"Wings of Love" (From the 1967 US album The Best of Herman's Hermits-Volume III)	Patrick Campbell-Lyons, Alex Spyropoulos	3:18
20.	"Mum and Dad" (From the 1967 US album The Best of Herman's Hermits-Volume III)	Peter Callander	2:01
