= List of Canadian number-one albums of 1965 =

This list contains the albums ranking number one in Canada in 1965.

== Albums ==
Date	Title	Artist	Ref
January 4	Beatles '65	The Beatles	
January 11	Beatles '65	The Beatles	
January 18	Beatles '65	The Beatles	
January 25	Beatles '65	The Beatles	
February 1	Beatles '65	The Beatles	
February 8	Beatles '65	The Beatles	
February 15	Beatles '65	The Beatles	
February 22	Beatles '65	The Beatles	
March 1	Beatles '65	The Beatles	
March 8	Mary Poppins	Movie Soundtrack	
March 15	Mary Poppins	Movie Soundtrack	
March 22	Mary Poppins	Movie Soundtrack	
March 29	Mary Poppins	Movie Soundtrack	
April 5	Mary Poppins	Movie Soundtrack	
April 12	Mary Poppins	Movie Soundtrack	
April 19	Mary Poppins	Movie Soundtrack	
April 26	Mary Poppins	Movie Soundtrack	
May 3	Mary Poppins	Movie Soundtrack	
May 10	Mary Poppins	Movie Soundtrack	
May 17	Mary Poppins	Movie Soundtrack	
May 24	Mary Poppins	Movie Soundtrack	
May 31	Mary Poppins	Movie Soundtrack	
June 7	Mary Poppins	Movie Soundtrack	
June 14	Mary Poppins	Movie Soundtrack	
June 21	Mary Poppins	Movie Soundtrack	
June 28	Beatles VI	The Beatles	
July 5	Beatles VI	The Beatles	
July 12	Beatles VI	The Beatles	
July 19	Beatles VI	The Beatles	
July 26	Beatles VI	The Beatles	
August 2	On Tour	Herman's Hermits	
August 9	On Tour	Herman's Hermits	
August 16	Beatles VI	The Beatles	
August 23	Beatles VI	The Beatles	
August 30	Out of Our Heads	Rolling Stones	
September 6	Help	Beatles Soundtrack	
September 13	Help	Beatles Soundtrack	
September 20	Help	Beatles Soundtrack	
September 27	Help	Beatles Soundtrack	
October 4	Help	Beatles Soundtrack	
October 11	Help	Beatles Soundtrack	
October 18	Help	Beatles Soundtrack	
October 25	Help	Beatles Soundtrack	
November 1	Look At Us	Sonny & Cher	
November 8	Help	Beatles Soundtrack	
November 15	Help	Beatles Soundtrack	
November 22	Look At Us	Sonny & Cher	
November 29	Look At Us	Sonny & Cher	
December 6	December's Children	Rolling Stones	
December 13	Help	Beatles Soundtrack	
December 20	December's Children	Rolling Stones	
December 27	December's Children	Rolling Stones	
