= Herman's Hermits on Tour =

1965 studio album by Herman's Hermits

Their Second Album! Herman's Hermits on Tour

Studio album by Herman's Hermits
- Released: June 1965
- Studios: Kingsway Recording Studio, London
- Genres: Pop, rock
- Label: MGM (US/Canada)
- Producer: Mickie Most

Herman's Hermits American chronology
Introducing Herman's Hermits (1965)	Their Second Album! Herman's Hermits on Tour (1965)	When the Boys Meet the Girls (1966)

Singles from Herman's Hermits on Tour
- 1. "Can't You Hear My Heartbeat" Released: January 1965; 2. "Silhouettes" Released: March 1965

Professional ratings
Review scores
Source	Rating
AllMusic	3/5 stars

Herman's Hermits on Tour (also called Their Second Album! Herman's Hermits on Tour) is the second US album by the English pop rock group Herman's Hermits. It was released by MGM Records in June 1965.

== Reception ==
Billboard magazine reviewed the album saying "The current hot British group performs numbers they offered during their recent concert tour of the U.S. Included are their singles hits", noting that "In addition to the rockers, Herman displays much warmth sensitive reading of 'The End of the World'."

Joe Viglione on AllMusic called the album a "highly listenable album created in a day when albums were secondary to hits." In his long review he would add that "The genius of Mickey Most is that he packs the punch into all these songs in a solitary moment - every one of them clocks in at three minutes and under. "Silhouettes" is three seconds shy of two minutes, "I'm Henry VIII, I Am" an amazingly succinct one minute and 49 seconds. These are short little pop blasts - you could really fit the 26 minutes on one side of a long-player - and the young Peter Noone brings each melody home."

== Chart performance ==
Billboard also called the album a "A chart buster LP", and that it was. On the Billboard Top LPs chart, the album peaked at number 2 during a thirty-nine-week run. The album debuted on the Cashbox Top 100 Albums in the issue dated 19 June 1965, peaking at No. 2 during a thirty-four-week run on the chart. On 31 August 1965, the album was certified Gold by the RIAA.

== Track listing ==
Side one
No.	Title	Writer(s)	Length
1.	"Can't You Hear My Heartbeat"	John Carter, Ken Lewis	2:15
2.	"I'm Henry VIII, I Am"	Fred Murray, R. P. Weston	1:49
3.	"The End of the World"	Arthur Kent, Sylvia Dee	2:57
4.	"For Your Love"	Graham Gouldman	2:21
5.	"(I Gotta) Dream On"	Gary Gordon	2:04
6.	"Don't Try to Hurt Me"	Keith Hopwood	2:04

Side two
No.	Title	Writer(s)	Length
1.	"Silhouettes"	Bob Crewe, Frank Slay	1:57
2.	"Heartbeat"	Bob Montgomery, Norman Petty	2:45
3.	"I'll Never Dance Again"	Barry Mann, Mike Anthony	3:00
4.	"Tell Me Baby"	Hopwood, Derek Leckenby	2:12
5.	"Traveling Light"	Sid Tepper, Roy C. Bennett	2:31

== Personnel ==
=== Herman's Hermits ===
- Peter Noone – vocals
- Derek Leckenby – lead guitar
- Keith Hopwood – rhythm guitar
- Karl Green – bass
- Barry Whitwam – drums

=== Technical ===
- Mickie Most – producer
- Val Valentin – engineer
- Michael Malatak – design
- Jim Spanfeller – cover drawing
