= Wonderful World (Sam Cooke song) =

1960 single by Sam Cooke

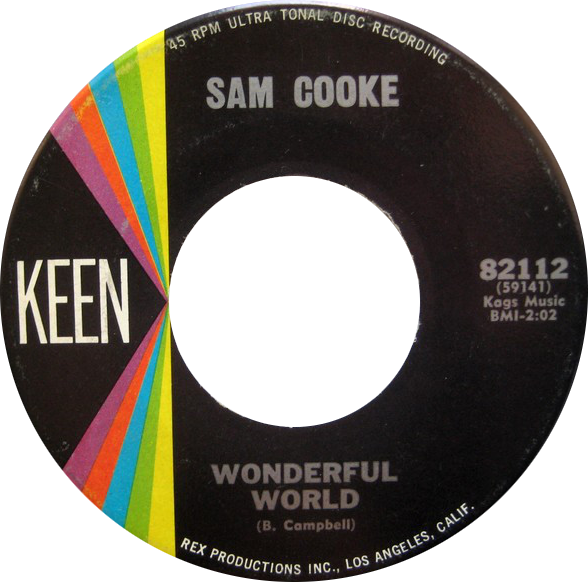
- One of side-A labels of the 1960 US single

Single by Sam Cooke

from the album The Wonderful World of Sam Cooke
- B-side: "Along the Navajo Trail"
- Released: April 14, 1960
- Recorded: March 2, 1959
- Studio: Radio Recorders, Hollywood
- Genre: Rhythm and blues, soul
- Length: 2:09
- Label: Keen, A&M, Dunhill
- Songwriters: Lou Adler, Herb Alpert, Sam Cooke
- Producer: Sam Cooke

Sam Cooke singles chronology
"You Understand Me" (1960)	"Wonderful World" (1960)	"With You" (1960)

Music video
- "What A Wonderful World" (lyric video) on YouTube

"Wonderful World" (occasionally referred to as "(What A) Wonderful World") is a song by American singer-songwriter Sam Cooke. Released on April 14, 1960, by Keen Records, it had been recorded during an impromptu session the previous year in March 1959, at Sam Cooke's last recording session at Keen. He signed with RCA Victor in 1960 and "Wonderful World", then unreleased, was issued as a single in competition. The song was mainly composed by songwriting team Lou Adler and Herb Alpert, but Cooke revised the lyrics to mention the subject of education more.

"Wonderful World" ended up doing substantially better on the charts than several of his early RCA Victor singles, becoming his biggest hit single since "You Send Me" in 1957. "Wonderful World" peaked at number 12 on the Billboard Hot 100 and hit number two on Billboard's Hot R&B Sides chart.

In 1965, Herman's Hermits recording of the song reached number one in Canada, number four in the United States, and number seven in the United Kingdom. Another version by Art Garfunkel with James Taylor and Paul Simon charted at number 17 in 1978. The Sam Cooke recording was featured in the film Animal House (1978) and gained greater recognition in the UK upon a 1986 re-release when it peaked at number two on the UK Singles Chart, going gold (it had peaked at number 27 on the UK singles chart on first release in 1960). Its 1986 success was attributed to sound-alike versions featured in the film Witness (1985) and a Levi's 501 television commercial.

== Background ==
Lou Adler and Herb Alpert composed the song with the theme that neither knowledge nor education can dictate feelings, but that love "could make the world a wonderful place". Adler did not take the song very seriously but Cooke appeared to be taken with it. "He’d say, ‘What about that song, you know?’ And then he'd start on it again," recalled Adler. Cooke wanted to steer the song toward the subject of schooling, revised the song and decided to cut it at a recording session on March 2, 1959, five days after completing his Billie Holiday tribute album, Tribute to the Lady. The writing credit for the song was put under Cooke's wife's maiden name, Barbara Campbell. Campbell was also listed on the record labels for two other Cooke hits: "Only Sixteen" and "Everybody Loves to Cha Cha Cha".

The session's main goal was to record three songs Cooke had composed. There was no arranger or orchestra and the personnel consisted of Cooke, guitarist Cliff White, bassist Adolphus Alsbrook, teenage drummer Ronnie Selico and a quartet of singers that Cooke biographer Peter Guralnick believes may have been the Pilgrim Travelers – J.W. Alexander, Lou Rawls, and George McCurn (nicknamed Oopie).

There is no known footage of Cooke performing the song, even though, in 1986, ABKCO president Allen Klein offered a $10,000 reward for anyone obtaining such footage.

== Release and reception ==
Cooke signed to RCA Victor in 1960 but his first two singles on the major label – "Teenage Sonata" and "You Understand Me" – failed to register on the charts. Meanwhile, John Siamas, co-founder of Keen Records, discovered the "demo" recording of "Wonderful World" among unreleased Cooke recordings. Keen released "Wonderful World" in competition with RCA's issue of "You Understand Me" in the same week. "Wonderful World" quickly became Cooke's best-performing single since his first hit "You Send Me", reaching number 12 on the Billboard Hot 100 and number two on the magazine's Hot R&B Sides chart. Billboard reviewed the single upon its release, giving it four stars and writing, "Moderate rocker gets a smooth belt from Sam Cooke in his usual, salable style."

In 2004, the song was placed 373rd in Rolling Stone magazine's 500 Greatest Songs of All Time.

The song was inducted into the Grammy Hall of Fame in 2014.

== Later versions ==
"Wonderful World"

Single by Herman's Hermits

from the album The Best of Herman's Hermits
- B-side: "I Gotta Dream On" (UK); "Traveling Light" (US)
- Released: April 16, 1965 (UK); May 1965 (US)
- Recorded: March 1965
- Studio: De Lane Lea, London
- Genre: R&B
- Length: 1:57
- Label: MGM
- Songwriters: Sam Cooke, Lou Adler, Herb Alpert
- Producer: Mickie Most

Herman's Hermits singles chronology
"Mrs. Brown, You've Got a Lovely Daughter" (1965)	"Wonderful World" (1965)	"Just a Little Bit Better" (1965)

"(What A) Wonderful World"

Single by Art Garfunkel

from the album Watermark
- B-side: "Wooden Planes"
- Released: January 1978
- Genre: Easy listening
- Length: 3:30
- Label: Columbia
- Songwriters: Sam Cooke, Lou Adler, Herb Alpert

Art Garfunkel singles chronology
"Break Away" (1975)	"(What A) Wonderful World" (1978)	"Since I Don't Have You" (1978)

- Herman's Hermits had a major hit in the mid-1960s with an uptempo version of the song (omitting one verse) which reached number one in Canada, number four in the US, and number seven in the UK. The Hermits' version was, according to singer Peter Noone and guitarist Keith Hopwood, done as a tribute to Cooke upon his death. In an interview with Hugh Brown prior to a 2020 concert in Edinburgh, Noone recalled that Jimmy Page, later founder of Led Zeppelin, played guitar on the track and was paid £12. Cash Box described it as having "an infectious, rhythmic blues-tinged warm-hearted style".
- In 1978, Art Garfunkel recorded the song at a slow tempo, with Paul Simon and James Taylor alternating as lead and backing vocalists. This reached number 17 on the US Billboard Hot 100 and number 15 on the Cash Box Top 100. The Garfunkel version also became a number-one US Adult Contemporary hit for five weeks. The song (as credited under the alternate title, "(What A) Wonderful World") was included on later versions of Garfunkel's solo album, Watermark. It was added in place of another song ("Fingerpaint") to capitalize on the single's success.
- The Delltones released a contemporary version of ("Wonderful World") on their 40th anniversary compilation album ("The Big Four O") in 1998.

== In popular culture ==
The song is used in the 1978 film Animal House in the well-known lunchroom scene where Bluto (John Belushi) gathers food in preparation for a food fight. The song was also included in the 1983 film Breathless. The original Sam Cooke version of the song comprised the title soundtrack of the 2005 film Hitch.

After a Greg Chapman cover of the song was featured prominently in the 1985 film Witness in a scene where Harrison Ford dances with Kelly McGillis, "Wonderful World" gained further exposure. Particularly in the United Kingdom, where a copy of the song, produced by Karl Jenkins and Mike Ratledge and with vocals sung by Barbadian Tony Jackson, a backing singer for Paul Young, appeared in "Bath", a well-remembered, Roger Lyons-directed 1985 advertisement for Levi's 501 jeans. As a result, the Sam Cooke version of the song became a hit in the UK, reaching No. 2 and selling a certified 250,000 copies. In a 2005 poll by the UK's Channel Four the song was voted the 19th-greatest song ever to feature in a commercial.

The song is featured in the official soundtrack of Mafia III, published on October 7, 2016.

== Charts ==
=== Weekly charts ===
==== Sam Cooke version ====
Chart (1960)	Peak position
UK Singles (Official Charts)	27
US Billboard Hot 100	12
US Hot R&B Sides (Billboard)	2
Chart (1986)	Peak position
Netherlands (Dutch Top 40)	1
UK Singles (Official Charts) 1986 rechart	2
Ireland (IRMA)	4
Chart (2022)	Peak position
Canada Digital Song Sales (Billboard)	39

==== Herman's Hermits version ====
Chart (1965)	Peak position
Canada RPM Top Singles	1
US Billboard Hot 100	4
UK Singles (Official Charts)	7

==== Johnny Nash version ====
Chart (1976)	Peak position
UK Singles (Official Charts)	25

==== Simon and Garfunkel with James Taylor version ====
Chart (1978)	Peak position
Canada RPM Adult Contemporary	1
Canada RPM Top Singles	13
US Easy Listening (Billboard)	1
US Billboard Hot 100	17
US Cash Box	15

== Certifications ==
Certifications for "Wonderful World"
Region	Certification	Certified units/sales
Spain (Promusicae)	Platinum	60,000^{‡}
United Kingdom (BPI)	Gold	400,000^{‡}
^{‡} Sales+streaming figures based on certification alone.

== Bibliography ==
- Wolff, Daniel J.; Crain, S. R.; White, Clifton; Tenenbaum, G. David (1995). You Send Me: The Life and Times of Sam Cooke. William Morrow & Co. ISBN 0-688-12403-8.
- Guralnick, Peter (2005). Dream Boogie: The Triumph of Sam Cooke. Little, Brown and Company. ISBN 978-0316377942.
