= Sleepy Joe =

Sleepy Joe may refer to:

- Sleepy Joe (nickname), an ill-intentioned nickname for 46th U.S. President Joe Biden
- Sleepy Joe (song), a 1968 song by Herman's Hermits
- Sleepy Joe's Café, a song by Bruce Springsteen.
