= Davyhulme Sewage Works =

Main sewage works for Manchester, England

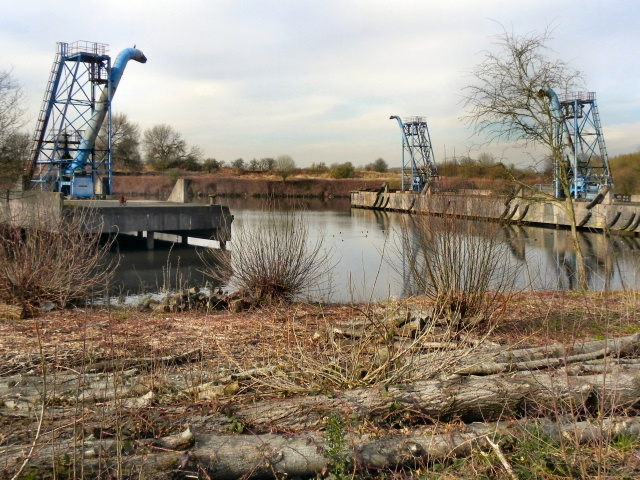
- The disused sludge hoppers used to load sludge into ships for transport to the sea

- Location within Greater Manchester
- Interactive map of Davyhulme Sewage Works
- Type: Waste Water Treatment Works
- Location: Davyhulme, Greater Manchester, England
- Coordinates: 53°27′49″N 2°22′20″W
- Area: 254 acres (103 ha)
- Created: 1894
- Operator: United Utilities

Davyhulme Sewage Works is the main waste water treatment works for the city of Manchester, England, and one of the largest in Europe. It was opened in 1894, and has pioneered the improvement of treatment processes.

With the growth of population in the late nineteenth century, and the proliferation of water closets, the rivers around Manchester were becoming grossly polluted, and the City of Manchester decided to build two deep level sewers to intercept existing sewers. When the first one reached Davyhulme, further extension was blocked by the Manchester Ship Canal, and so a treatment works was built there. The works used precipitation tanks, and a 3 ft (914 mm) gauge tramway was built, to facilitate the movement of materials around the site. The first steam locomotive was acquired in 1897, and a further fourteen steam and two diesel locomotives operated on the system before its closure in 1958.

Treated sludge was loaded into ships and discharged into the Mersey estuary from 1898. Over the next hundred years, seven ships were used to transport the sludge, including one borrowed from Glasgow after another hit a mine and sank. At first, ships used the ship canal to transport sludge from the works, but later a pipeline was built to Liverpool, and the ships made a much shorter journey.

An early feature was a laboratory, where trials of various types of filter were carried out, and incoming effluent was analysed. Attempts to improve the treatment process proved successful in 1914, when two chemists, Ardern and Lockett, discovered the Activated Sludge Process, which was soon in use worldwide. A second deep level sewer, started in 1911, eventually reached the works in 1928, and to cope with the increased flows, half of the sewage was fed into a new Activated Sludge plant. Three separate operating systems were installed, so that comparisons on their efficiency could be made. A second Activated Sludge plant was built between 1955 and 1966, and the control system on the first was upgraded between 1970 and 1973.

In 1974, the Rivers Committee, which had managed the site since its inception, ceased to be, when water and sewage treatment became the responsibility of the newly formed North West Water Authority. The organisation was subsequently privatised, and became part of United Utilities in 1995. In order to meet demands for better water quality, a pilot Biostyr plant was built in 1992, and a much larger one was completed in 1998. Innovation continued, with the commissioning of the world's largest thermal hydrolysis plant in 2013, using a new process to break down sludge, which generates methane as a by-product, enabling the site to be self-sufficient for gas and electricity. An upgrade to the Activated Sludge plant began in 2014, and is expected to be completed in 2018.

== History ==
The city of Manchester experienced rapid growth during the eighteenth and nineteenth centuries, and the existing administrative bodies were not equipped to deal with such expansion. The area was managed by the court leet, which was responsible for all administration and judicial functions. The Manchester and Salford Police Act 1792 led to the establishment of a day and night watch. The night watch was mainly a guard against fire. At that time the word police was used to mean administration, rather than the handling of law and order. A group of police commissioners were established to manage cleansing and water supply. In 1797, this was formalised, by creating separate commissioners for Salford and for Manchester. The Municipal Corporations Act 1835 (5 & 6 Will. 4. c. 76) paved the way for borough councils to be established, with ratepayers electing their members. A petition to create such a council for Manchester was organised by two industrialists, Richard Cobden and Thomas Potter, but this was resisted by both the Court Leet and the Police Commissioners, who stood to lose some of their powers.

Despite the opposition, Manchester's first proper council was elected in 1838, although its area of jurisdiction was quite small, and there were independent areas within the city, such as Chorlton-on-Medlock, which had their own committees to manage local functions. The new council began the task of constructing a brick-built sewerage network within the city. In 1847, John Francis the Borough Surveyor suggested using egg-shaped clay pipes instead, and using these proved to be much quicker. However, the period also saw the introduction of the water closet, the forerunner of the modern flush toilet, and this resulted in much larger volumes of effluent entering the system. The council tried to limit their use to public buildings and the homes of the rich, as the waste was discharged in an untreated state into the rivers, which were becoming grossly polluted. This policy was not successful, and by the early 1890s, around 90 per cent of the housing in Manchester had water closets.

In an attempt to deal with river pollution, the council created the River Medlock Improvement Committee on 1 April 1863. Such problems were not limited to Manchester, and two pieces of legislation were introduced nationally to address the issues. The first was the Public Health Act 1875 (38 & 39 Vict. c. 55), and the second was the Rivers Pollution Prevention Act 1876 (39 & 40 Vict. c. 75). In the following year, the River Medlock Improvement Committee became the Rivers Committee, and proposed a combined drainage scheme for the city and 15 other authorities with responsibility for the areas around the city. All pulled out of the scheme because of the likely cost, but in 1888, the City of Manchester decided to proceed on its own. Two deep level sewers were authorised, which intercepted the existing sewers before they discharged into the rivers. When the first sewer reached Davyhulme, further progress was impeded by the Manchester Ship Canal, then being built, and the site became the location of the sewage treatment works. It had the advantage that treated water could be discharged into the ship canal to maintain water levels.

=== Construction ===
Manchester Corporation bought 98.84 acres (40.00 ha) of land at Davyhulme from the landowner, Sir Humphrey Francis de Trafford. They paid £13,333 on 14 December 1889, and in 1891, they paid £6,981 for another 27 acres (11 ha). All of the land was close to the ship canal, on a large loop which had formerly been the course of the River Irwell. The construction work was managed by the City Surveyor, and used direct labour, with a contract for the machinery being awarded to Manlove, Alliott & Co. Ltd. The sewage was to be treated in eleven precipitation tanks, arranged as a bank of six tanks and a bank of five, separated by a 20-foot (6.1 m) wide roadway. The complete structure measured 1,170 by 100 feet (357 by 30 m). The main building complex included a power plant with two Lancashire steam boilers, which produced hydraulic power, compressed air and electricity. After treatment, sludge was removed from the tanks using air-powered ejectors, and was compressed using hydraulic sludge presses. There was also an office building, and a range of facilities for the workers.

An order was placed with Barningham and Co. in August 1893 for rails, sleepers and wagons for a 3 ft (914 mm) gauge railway system, which would be used to deliver lime to the lime store and carry the compressed sludge to the old river bed for disposal. Barningham had previously supplied equipment to the Corporation for a light railway on Carrington Moss for the Cleansing Department. Track laying was carried out by the Paving Sub Committee and Highways Department. The Corporation also paid the Ship Canal company to construct Davyhulme Wharf, which would enable coal and chemicals to be delivered to the site. This required the railway to be extended and a road to be built to serve the wharf, and this work was not completed until October 1894, although the works had begun to treat sewage in January 1894.

There was a dispute with Manlove Alliot in May 1894 over the number of railway wagons to be supplied. The Corporation thought they had ordered 20 tipping wagons for the transport of the sludge cakes, but only four were supplied by Manlove Alliot, and eight extra wagons, which they had used during construction, were also being used for this purpose. The Corporation eventually ordered eight more. The wagons were moved using both manual labour and horses.

The incoming sewage ran through a catch pit, which removed large debris, and into the precipitation tanks. Liquid was removed from the top, and sludge from the bottom. The sludge was mixed with lime in three sludge pits, and then pressed into cakes. Initially, the works produced around 738 tons of pressed cake per week. Some 50 tons a day were sold as fertiliser, with the rest being carried by the railway to the old river bed for dumping. The liquid flowed along an open channel to 26.25 acres (10.62 ha) of land, which was used for land filtration, before the treated effluent was discharged into the Ship Canal. The process was inadequate for the volumes entering the works, and the canal became increasingly polluted. Consideration was given to discharging the effluent into the tidal River Mersey, by construction of a culvert to Randall's sluices, near Warrington, or treating it by the use of septic tanks and double-contact bacteria beds. The second option was chosen, as the first would have reduced the flow in the Ship Canal.

=== Expansion ===
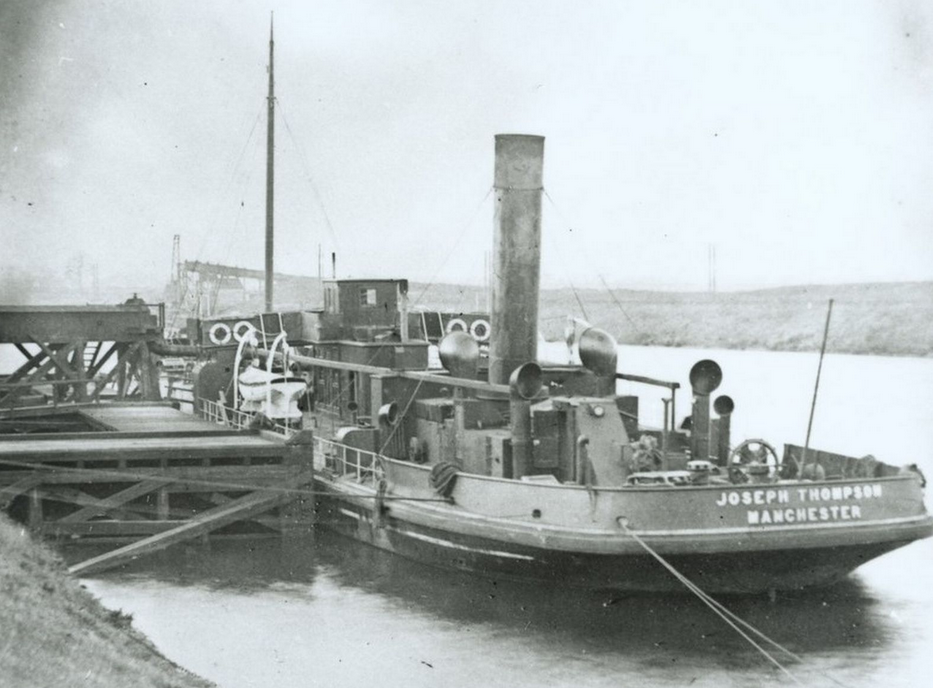
The Joseph Thompson loading sludge at Davyhulme jetty in 1898

A small laboratory was built near the power house in mid-1896. Trials were begun with several types of filter, but none were particularly effective, although they were better than land filtration. The old river bed soon became full of sludge, and the Corporation purchased a boat, so that the sludge could be dumped at sea. The Joseph Thompson was built in Barrow in Furness at a cost of £24,837, and made its first voyage in December 1897. Loading of the sludge took around 45 minutes, the journey down the Ship Canal took six and a half hours, and the sludge was discharged near the Mersey Bar Light in five minutes.

Conversion of the treatment process from chemical precipitation to septic tanks and sedimentation tanks began in December 1900, and was completed on 4 August 1904. The tanks covered an area of 12.5 acres (5.1 ha). Air was excluded from them by the formation of a scum on the surface, and anaerobic microbes broke down the sewage. The 'first contact bacteria beds' covered 46 acres (19 ha), with a similar area used for 'second contact bacteria beds'. There were also 26 acres (11 ha) which were used for 'storm water filters'. The bacteria beds were filled with a media of coke or granite chippings, around which microbes formed a slimy film. The oxygen-loving microbes digested the organic matter in the sewage as it passed through the media.

The railway system was heavily used in the construction of the beds. A steam locomotive had been purchased in 1897, and another four were bought as the work expanded. Once the filter beds had been completed, they needed to be emptied for the media to be washed, regraded and topped up every few years, and this became the primary function of the railway for the next 32 years. It was also used to remove rubbish from the screening chambers, moving 861 wagon loads between October 1901 and March 1902. By July 1905, the primary bacteria beds had been completed, and an extra 126 acres (51 ha) of land had been bought at Flixton and Carrington, which was to be used for secondary bacteria beds and land filtration. By 1905, the works owned a total of 295 acres (119 ha), which included the route for a conduit from Davyhulme to Flixton.

The Corporation had never liked the idea of secondary beds so far from the main works, and the plans were changed. An experimental secondary bed was built on a site close to Barton Locks. Extra land was bought from Barton and Irwell Rural District Council, on condition that the works treated sewage from the local area. This required another 4 acres (1.6 ha) of primary bacteria beds. The secondary beds was gradually brought on-line as they were completed. The area dedicated to this function increased from 6.5 acres (2.6 ha) in March 1909, to 17 acres (6.9 ha) in October 1910, and 37.25 acres (15.07 ha) by the time the project was finished in April 1914. Each secondary bed covered about 1 acre (0.40 ha), and was filled with a much finer media than the primary beds.

=== Development ===
Scientific analysis of the effluent flowing into the works had been carried out since the first laboratory was built, and effort had also been expended on trying to improve the treatment process. Gilbert Fowler, who had been the Consulting Chemist since 1904, went to America in 1912 where H W Clarke of the Massachusetts Board of Health was conducting experiments on the oxidation of aerated waste water by micro organisms. The organisms were largely algae, but other organisms thrived in the algal slime. The experiments were on a small scale, using bottles, which were emptied daily and refilled with waste water, allowing the algae to remain on the walls of the bottles.

When he returned to England, Fowler suggested to Edward Ardern, his chief chemist, and W.T.Lockett, the chief research assistant, that they research ways to reduce the growth of algae. They lowered the light levels, as sunlight often triggered the growth of algae, and kept the precipitant floc, which contained many bacteria, from one experiment to the next. Each subsequent experiment was more successful than the last, as the sludge showed better clarifying properties as it got older. Ardern and Lockett had discovered the Activated Sludge Process, which was soon being used worldwide. The research was carried out at Manchester University, and Fowler presented the results at the Grand Hotel in Manchester in April and November 1914.

A small Activated Sludge Plant was constructed on the site in 1916, one of the septic tanks was converted between 1918 and 1921 to provide a larger test bed, and a permanent installation was built at Withington Sewage Works, in south Manchester. All proved to be successful, but a full-scale plant was not built at Davyhulme until more than ten years later. A second main intercepting sewer, which would link various districts in southern Manchester to Davyhulme had been authorised by Act of Parliament in 1911, and construction began soon afterwards, but it took years to complete. It was extended by further Acts in 1914, 1920 and 1924, and sewage finally entered the works on 22 November 1928. To cope with the new flows, the size of the inlet works detritus tanks and screening chamber was quadrupled, and a decision was made to feed half of the output from the screening plant to a new Activated Sludge Plant.

The Bristol-based Russell Contracting Company were awarded the contract for the new plant, and work started in October 1930 on a 7-acre (2.8 ha) site located to the north east of the septic tanks. It would use three operating systems, with the majority of the flow using an air diffusion process, developed in-house. In order to allow comparisons to be made, two small sections would use the surface aeration or "Simplex" system, and the bio-aeration or "Sheffield" system, developed by John Haworth at Blackburn Meadows Sewage Works in Sheffield. A celebration dinner was held at Manchester Town Hall on 15 May 1935 to mark the official opening of the new plant. The process was more efficient than the bacteria bed system, covering a much smaller area for the same volumes of sewage, and being largely automatic, used a lot less labour.

=== Modernisation ===
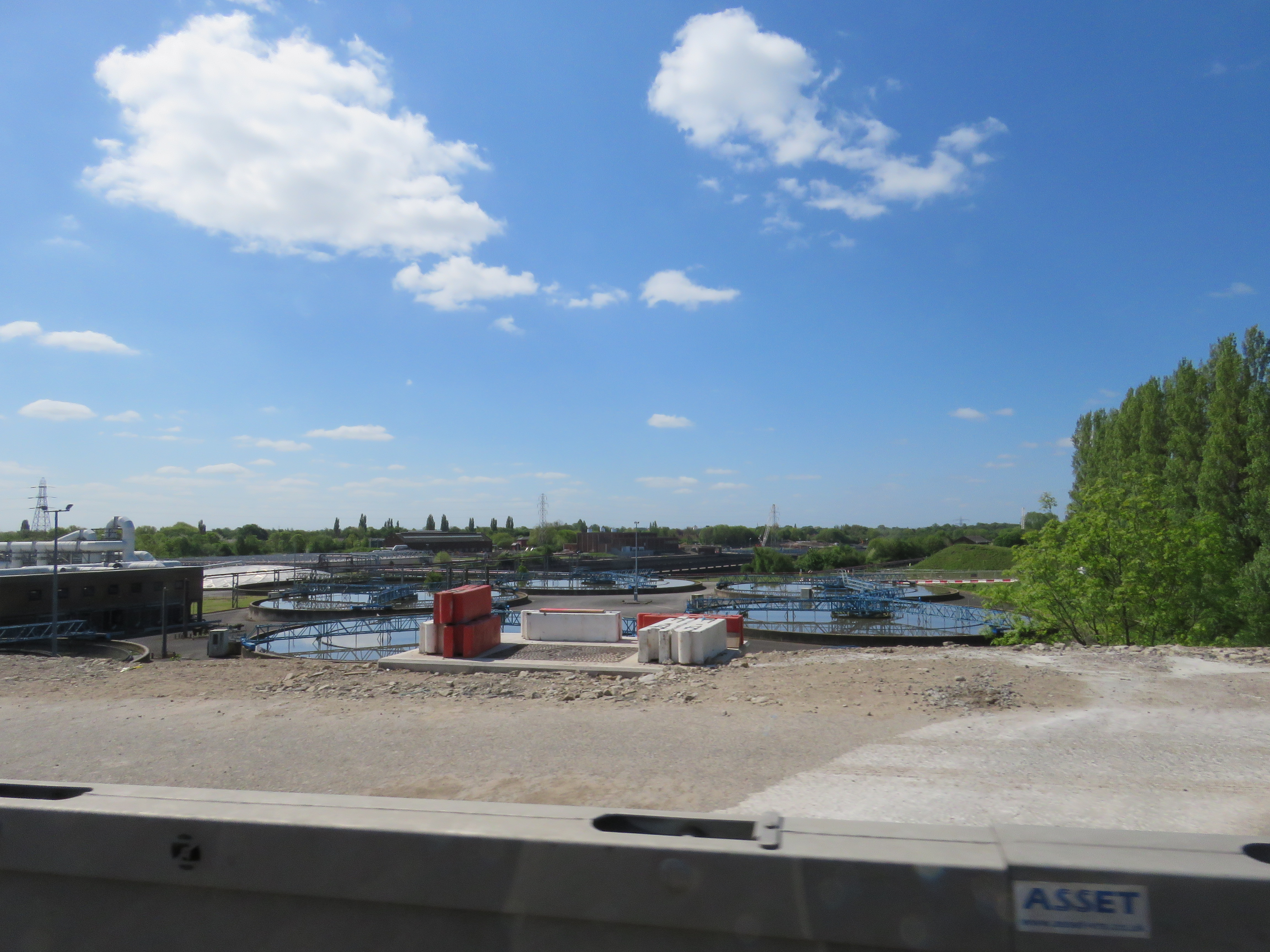
The settling tanks at Davyhulme, viewed from the M60 motorway

In November 1935, a decision was made to convert the entire works to use the Activated Sludge system. Renewal of the media in the primary and secondary bacteria beds ceased, and by September 1936, both of the media washing plants had been dismantled. Railway tracks around the primary beds were removed during 1937. Rolling stock on the railway consisted of one steam locomotive and two diesels, bought in 1935 from Hudswell Clarke. Construction of a new sludge digestion plant and two secondary sludge digestion tanks was finished in June 1939, and two new settlement tanks were completed in 1940. Five large lagoons were built at Flixton in 1941, which could be used to store sludge in an emergency. The Mancunium sank after hitting a mine in the Mersey estuary in January 1941, but all of the crew were rescued. Parts of the works were damaged by bombs in March and May 1941 and in January 1942. Transport of sludge to the sea was maintained by borrowing the Shieldhall from Glasgow Corporation, until a new Mancunium was built by Ferguson Bros. of Glasgow. It arrived at the works on 27 December 1946.

After a public enquiry held at Manchester Town Hall on 23 August 1955, plans for the second Activated Sludge plant were finally approved. The nine-year project was expected to cost £5.5 million. After slow progress, the first contractor became bankrupt in February 1957, and the contract was transferred to Percy Trentham Ltd., but progress remained slow. The railway ceased to be used in June 1958. Some rails, wagons and the two diesel locomotives were sold for further use, while the rest of the system was scrapped. In 1960, the design of the Activated Sludge plant was changed to use the 'Simplex' system rather than the bio-aeration process. It was completed in 1966, at a cost of £6.5 million, and a celebration luncheon was held at Manchester Town Hall on 17 May.

Upgrading of the first Activated Sludge plant to use the 'Simplex' system took place between 1970 and 1973. Because of the proximity of the M60 motorway and the risk that deep excavations might damage it, seven of the final settling tanks were built above ground. Effluent from the Activated Sludge plant was raised up to the level of the tanks by screw pumps, and the increased hydraulic head improved their performance. The upgrade also included five primary settlement tanks and eight sludge consolidation tanks. Two new sludge boats were purchased in 1971 and 1972, and a new dock was constructed on land which had formerly been used for secondary beds.

=== Administration ===
On 1 April 1974, the Rivers Department and the Rivers Committee ceased to exist, when responsibility for the works passed from Manchester City Council to the newly formed North West Water Authority. The Authority built a new control room in 1981, which housed a computer control system for the site. Three years later, eight new sludge digesters were built, to enable all sludge dumped at sea to be digested first. Construction of the Mersey Valley Regional Sludge Pipeline began, linking Oldham to Davyhulme, and continuing to Sandon Dock in Liverpool. Davyhulme was able to treat sludge from a number of other sewage works to the east, and pump the digested product to Liverpool. Sludge boats ceased to use the ship canal, taking 15 minutes to transport sludge from Liverpool to a point to the north of the Bar Light in the Mersey, instead of over six hours required when using the canal.

A campaign to improve water quality in the ship canal and the Mersey Basin began in 1985, which had implications for the treatment works. The National Rivers Authority set limits on the volumes of Biological Oxygen, suspended solids and ammonia in any effluent discharged in water courses. North West Water elected to try a new process called Biostyr to meet these demands, and subsequently, water quality in the canal reached the Class 2 standard, enabling coarse fish to thrive. The old secondary beds were declared a Site of Biological Importance in 1985. North West Water was privatised with the passing of the Water Act 1989. A pilot Biostyr plant was built in 1992, costing £2 million, and following the merger of North West Water with the North West Electricity Board (Norweb) in 1995, a contract for the construction of a 36 cell Biostyr plant was awarded. The project, costing £50 million, was completed in 1998.

The dumping of sludge in the sea ended in 1998, following a European Community Directive, and the remaining sludge boats were sold. The sludge pipeline was used to transfer sludge to Shell Green, near Widnes, where it is turned into ash, or used in agriculture. Parts of the old secondary beds became the Davyhulme Millennium Nature Reserve in 2000, and low-profile geodesic domes were built over the primary settlement tanks in 2003, as part of a £20 million odour control scheme. The works continues to be innovative. In 2013, the world's largest thermal hydrolysis plant was commissioned. Sludge is heated to 165 degrees Celsius under pressure, and the pressure is then released in a flash tank. This process breaks up complex organic substances, allowing it to be digested more easily. Large volumes of methane are a by-product, which enables the site to be self-sufficient for gas and electricity. A £200 million upgrade to the second Activated Sludge Plant began in 2014, and is expected to be completed in 2018. The works now handles sewage for a population of 1.2 million people, most of which is water. Income is generated from the processing of trade effluent, which accounts for 70 percent of the organic load. Its output forms around 40 percent of the ship canal below Barton Locks.

== Ships ==
The Corporation operated seven ships for the transport of sludge. Their details are summarised below.

Name	Year built	Builder (yard number)	Capacity (tonnes)	length ft. (m)	Notes
Joseph Thompson	1897	Naval Construction & Armament Co, Barrow in Furness	950		Last worked 8 March 1933. Sold for scrap.
Mancunium	1933	Ferguson Bros, Port Glasgow (305)	1,250	246.2 (75)	Hit a mine 15 January 1941 and sank.
S S Shieldhall	1910	Wm Beardmore, Dalmuir (497)		260.8 (79.5)	On loan from Glasgow Corporation 18 March 1941 to 22 April 1947. Scrapped 1955 at Port Glasgow.
Mancunium	1946	Ferguson Bros, Port Glasgow (383)	1,400	268 (81)	Bow thrusters. Sold 1987. Scrapped 5 March 1990.
Percy Dawson	1968	Ferguson Bros, Port Glasgow. (451)	1,500	257.5 (78)	Sold 1987.
Gilbert J Fowler	1971	Ferguson Bros, Port Glasgow (460)	3,000	298.8 (91)	Bow thrusters. Sold 1998. Scrapped 2006 at Gadani ship-breaking yard.
Consortium I	1972	Ferguson Bros, Port Glasgow (463)	1,400	298.6 (91)	Bow thrusters. Owned by several local authorities. Sold 1998.

== Locomotives ==
The Corporation operated 15 steam and two diesel locomotives during the life of the railway system. Most were named after prominent members of the Rivers Committee, although some of the secondhand machines either had no name or retained their original name. Only Dawson was still working when the system closed. Their details are summarised below.

Name	Builder	Works No.	Year built	Arrangement	Notes
McDougall	Aveling and Porter	3990	1897	2-2-0 well tank	Scrapped April 1925
Great Western	Bristol & Exeter Rly		1875	0-4-0 well tank	Bought secondhand, April 1902. No nameplate carried. Sold for scrap, June 1914
Sir Bosdin	Bagnall	1670	1901	0-4-0 saddle tank	'Margaret' class. Sold to W H Arnott Young, April 1937
Dreyfus	Bagnall	1676	1902	0-4-0 saddle tank	'Margaret' class. Scrapped January 1931, when boiler cracked.
Bagnall	Bagnall	1232	1891	0-4-0 inverted saddle tank	Bought from Scropton Tramway, June 1902. No nameplate carried. Cut up on site by W H Arnott Young, July 1933
Frowde	Peckett	1129	1907	0-4-0 saddle tank	Sold to W H Arnott Young, April 1937. Scrapped June 1951.
West	Peckett	1131	1907	0-4-0 saddle tank	Boiler condemned, September 1930
Scott	Peckett	1132	1907	0-4-0 saddle tank	Out of service, March 1932
Leah	Peckett	1133	1907	0-4-0 saddle tank	Sold to Chris Holden, April 1935
Moston	Peckett	1384	1914	0-4-0 saddle tank	Sold to W H Arnott Young, April 1937. May have been used as a stationary boiler for the sludge digestion tanks.
Tattoo	Kerr Stuart	852	1904	0-4-2 saddle tank	Bought secondhand, February 1921. Cut up on site by W H Arnott Young, July 1933
Cundiff	Avonside	1731	1915	0-4-0 side tank	Bought secondhand, February 1922. Sold to W H Arnott Young, April 1937
Heaton Park	Avonside	1003	1907	0-4-2 saddle tank	Bought September 1927. Kept for spares for Prestwich. Cut up by W H Arnott Young, July 1933
Parrenthorn	Avonside	1006	1907	0-4-2 saddle tank	Bought September 1927. Kept for spares for Prestwich. Cut up by W H Arnott Young, July 1933
Prestwich	Avonside	1055	1908	0-4-2 saddle tank	Bought September 1927 and refurbished. Sold to Chris Holden, April 1935
White	Hudswell Clarke	D584	1934	4w diesel	Engine removed, November 1952. Sold to Piel & Walney Gravel Co, April 1959
Dawson	Hudswell Clarke	D585	1934	4w diesel	Worked until system closed, June 1958. Sold to Piel & Walney Gravel Co, March 1959

== Bibliography ==
- Booth, A. J. (1986). "Sheffield's Sewage Works Railways". Industrial Railway Record. Industrial Railway Society. ISSN 0537-5347.
- Nicholls, Robert (2015). Davyhulme Sewage Works and its Railway. Narrow Gauge Railway Society. ISBN 978-0-9554326-8-2.
- Public Information Unit (1978). Davyhulme Effluent Treatment Works. North West Water.
- Rivers Dept (1965). Davyhulme Sewage Treatment Works. City of Manchester Rivers Department.
