= Steve Milner =

English cricketer

Personal information
- Full name: Steven Andrew Milner
- Born: 22 February 1953 (age 73); Davyhulme, Cheshire, England
- Batting: Left-handed
- Bowling: Right-arm fast-medium

Domestic team information
- Years: Team
- 1975: Minor Counties North
- 1974–1976: Cheshire

Career statistics
Competition	List A
Matches	4
Runs scored	13
Batting average	13.00
100s/50s	–/–
Top score	9*
Balls bowled	258
Wickets	2
Bowling average	81.50
5 wickets in innings	–
10 wickets in match	–
Best bowling	1/15
Catches/stumpings	–/–
- Source: Cricinfo, 9 July 2012

Steven Andrew Milner (born 22 February 1953) is a former English cricketer. Milner was a left-handed batsman who bowled right-arm fast-medium. He was born at Davyhulme, Lancashire.

Milner made his debut for Cheshire against Staffordshire in the 1974 Minor Counties Championship. He made 21 further Minor Counties Championship appearances for Cheshire, the last of which came against Staffordshire in 1976. Playing minor counties cricket for Cheshire allowed Milner to be selected to play for Minor Counties North in the 1975 Benson & Hedges Cup. He made his List A debut for the team against Yorkshire. He made three further List A appearances during the tournament, the last of which came against Lancashire. In his four List A matches, he scored 13 runs with a high score of 9 not out, while with the ball he took 2 wickets, at an average of 81.50, with best figures of 1/15.
