= Mrs. Brown, You've Got a Lovely Daughter (EP) =

EP by Herman's Hermits
- Released: June 1965
- Genre: Pop
- Label: EMI
- Producer: Mickie Most)

Herman's Hermits British chronology
Herman's Hermits (1965)	Mrs. Brown, You've Got a Lovely Daughter (1965)	Herman's Hermits Hits (1965)

The Mrs. Brown, You've Got a Lovely Daughter EP by Herman's Hermits is the band's second EP and was released in the United Kingdom by EMI/Columbia (catalogue number SEG 8440.) It entered the Record Retailer EP Chart week ending June 12, 1965 and peaked at No.3.

== Track listing ==
Side 1

1. "Mrs. Brown, You've Got a Lovely Daughter" (Trevor Peacock) - 2:48
2. "I Know Why" (Derek Leckenby, Charles Silverman)

Side 2

1. "Show Me Girl" (Gerry Goffin, Carole King)
2. "Your Hand in Mine" (Harvey Lisberg, Charles Silverman)
