= Davyhulme =

Coordinates: 53.455881°N 2.368252°W

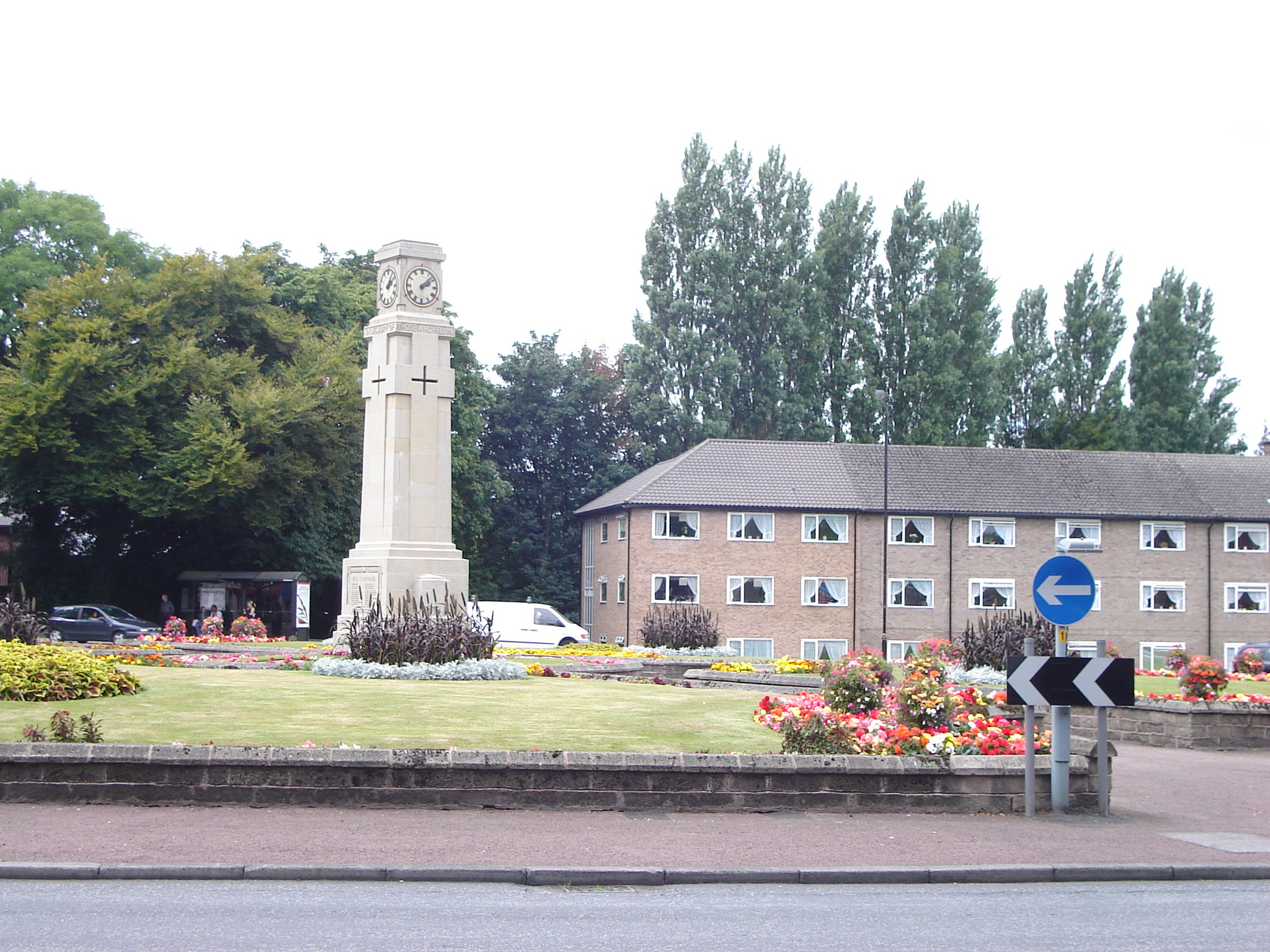
- Davyhulme Circle

- Location within Greater Manchester
- Population: 19,634 (2011)
- OS grid reference: SJ755955
- Metropolitan borough: Trafford
- Metropolitan county: Greater Manchester
- Region: North West
- Country: England
- Sovereign state: United Kingdom
- Post town: MANCHESTER
- Postcode district: M41
- Dialling code: 0161
- Police: Greater Manchester
- Fire: Greater Manchester
- Ambulance: North West
- UK Parliament: Stretford and Urmston

Davyhulme (/ˈdeɪvihjuːm/) is an area of Trafford, Greater Manchester, England, historically in Lancashire. The population at the 2011 census was 19,634.

== Davyhulme Sewage Works ==
The area is notable for Davyhulme Sewage Works, one of the largest wastewater treatment plants in Europe. Opened in 1894, the site is operated by United Utilities and serves a population of 1.2 million in and around the city of Manchester. The facility includes a biogas combined heat and power facility, producing renewable energy from gas produced by the anaerobic digestion of sewage.

== Parks ==
Davyhulme Millennium Nature Reserve is a green area set along the Manchester Ship Canal, formerly part of the waterworks site. It is popular with dog-walkers, and children on bicycles. The area is owned by United Utilities.

Davyhulme Park is a green flag awarded park in the area. It contains two large wildlife ponds, two bowling greens, tennis courts, children's playgrounds and a rose garden.

== Trafford General Hospital ==
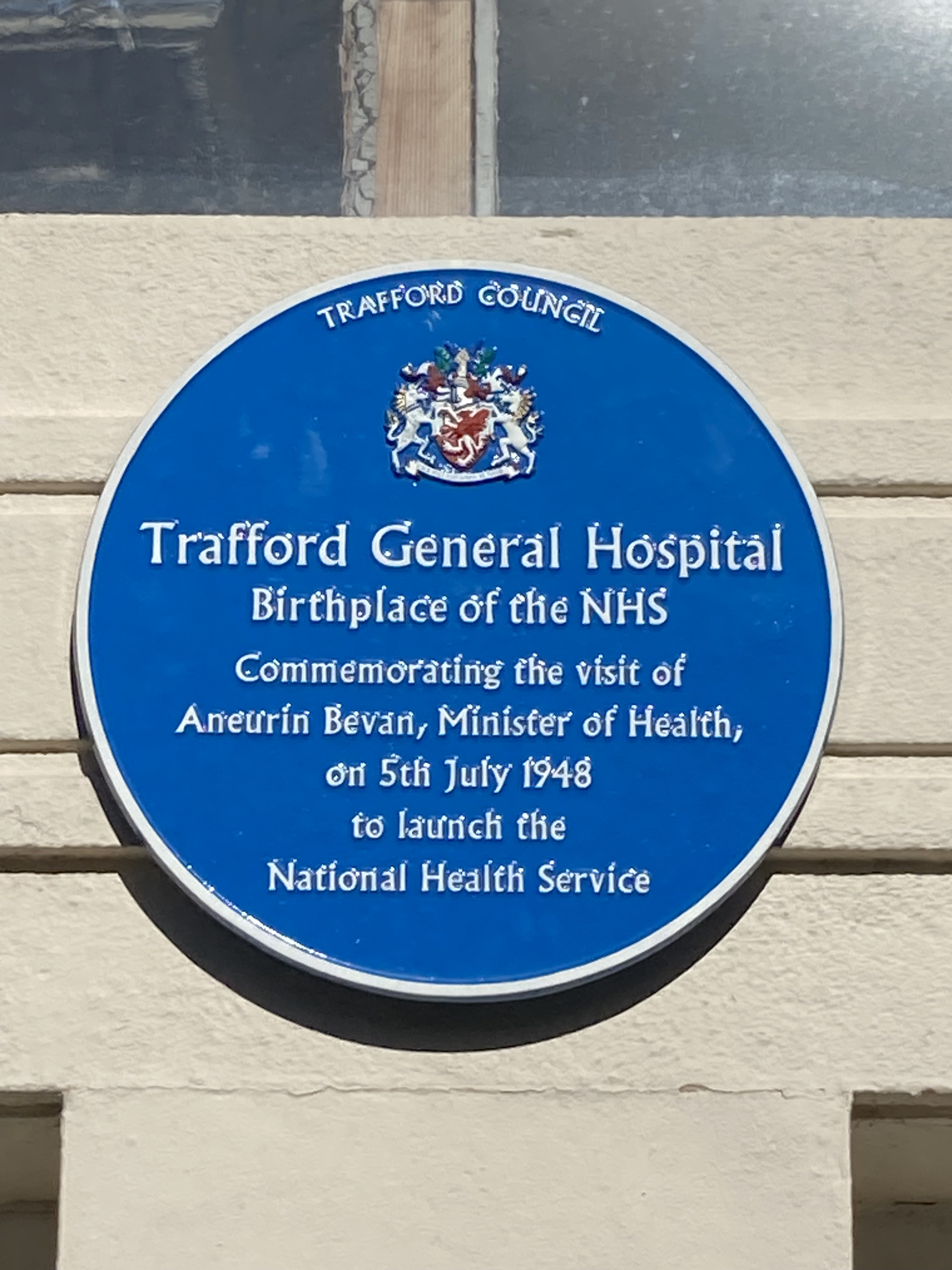
Blue plaque, Trafford General Hospital

Trafford General Hospital opened to patients in 1928 and was originally called Davyhulme Park Hospital. It became the first NHS hospital in 1948.

A blue plaque commemorating the birth of the NHS on 5th July 1948 can be found on display at the hospital entrance. It was unveiled in 2018 by Andy Burnham, the Mayor of Greater Manchester, to mark 70 years of the NHS.

== Politics ==
Davyhulme is divided into the electoral wards of Davyhulme East and Davyhulme West. Part of Urmston is in Davyhulme East and some of neighbouring Flixton in Davyhulme West. The area generally elects Conservative Councillors. However at the 2018 Local elections, 2 Labour Councillors were elected by the two wards.

It is in the parliamentary constituency of Stretford and Urmston, but until the 1997 general election it gave its name to the Davyhulme constituency. Winston Churchill's grandson, also called Winston Churchill, was the Conservative MP for more than 25 years, but since 1997 Labour Party MPs have been elected.

On 31 December 1894 Davyhulme became a civil parish, being formed from part of Barton upon Irwell, on 1 April 1974 the parish was abolished. In 1951 the parish had a population of 12,223.

== Notable people ==
- Peter Collins, world champion speedway rider
- Charles Ewart, Scottish war hero, spent the last 16 years of his life here
- Karl Green, bassist, vocalist with 60s pop group Herman's Hermits, musician, songwriter
- Keith Hopwood, guitarist, keyboards, vocalist with pop group Herman's Hermits, record producer, composer, businessman
- Ian McShane, actor
- Steve Milner, cricketer
- Jim Noir (real name Alan Roberts), composer, producer and multi-instrumentalist
- Peter Noone, singer with pop group Herman's Hermits
- David Andrew Phoenix, biochemist
- Nicky Reid, footballer
- Paul Stenning, author
- Matthew Kelly, Television Presenter and actor
- Stephen Patrick Morrissey, Former frontman of The Smiths, songwriter, and successful solo artist.

== See also ==
- Listed buildings in Urmston
