= Show Me Girl =

Single by Herman's Hermits
- B-side: "I Know Why"
- Released: 13 November 1964
- Genre: Beat
- Length: 2:34
- Label: Columbia
- Songwriters: Gerry Goffin; Carole King
- Producer: Mickie Most

Herman's Hermits singles chronology
"I'm into Something Good" (1964)	"Show Me Girl" (1964)	"Silhouettes" (1965)

"Show Me Girl" is a song written by Gerry Goffin and Carole King and performed by Herman's Hermits. It was released as a single on 13 November 1964.

== Background ==
Gerry Goffin and Carole King wrote "Show Me Girl" specifically for Herman's Hermits, who recorded the song following the success of their first single, "I'm Into Something Good", also written by Goffin and King. On 2 October 1964, The Motherwell Times reported Herman's Hermits had just recorded "Show Me Girl".

== Release ==
Columbia released "Show Me Girl" on 13 November 1964 with "I Know Why" as the B-side. On the same day, Herman's Hermits were scheduled to perform "Show Me Girl" on Ready, Steady, Go!. The single reached number 19 in the UK. In June 1965, the song appeared on the band's second EP, Mrs. Brown, You've Got a Lovely Daughter.

"Show Me Girl" was not released as a single in North America. The song appeared on the band''s first US album, Herman's Hermits.

== Reception ==
The Liverpool Echo and Evening Express wrote, "Herman's distinctive voice makes for easy listening but not all of the "Something Good" magic has found its way into this one." A columnist for The Newry Telegraph wrote that "Show Me Girl" was "so cute with a tuneful grow-on-you melody and Herman's good personality oozes from every line". Janice Nicholls wrote in the Sunday Mercury that the song was "not a patch on "I'm Into Something Good" and isn't even well sung", giving it three marks out of five. John Mitchell of the Halifax Daily Courier and Guardian wrote, "Herman's sad, innocent voice recalls a face pressed against the window".

== Charts ==
Chart performance for "Show Me Girl"
Chart (1964)	Peak position
Australia (Kent Music Report)	25
Sweden (Sverigetopplistan)	19
UK (Record Retailer)	19
