= Adolphus Alsbrook =

American jazz and R&B musician

- Born: February 21, 1912; Kansas City, Kansas
- Died: June 2, 1988 (aged 76) Canada
- Occupation: American jazz musician

Adolphus J. Alsbrook Jr. (February 21, 1912 – June 2, 1988) was an American jazz and R&B musician, arranger and composer. He played the double bass, bass guitar, and harp.

== Life and work ==
Alsbrook attended Sumner High School and studied classical double bass and harp at the University of Kansas, University of Minnesota and the Chicago Conservatory of Music. From 1933 to 1954 he lived intermittently in Minneapolis, where he taught and worked as an arranger. In the early 1930s he played with Boyd Atkins and at the Cotton Club with Jo Jones in Rook Ganz's band. During this time he also played with Lester Young and Count Basie Alsbrook played his main instrument, the double bass, but also harp, accordion and guitar. He also wrote several novelty songs. As an arranger, he worked in Minneapolis for the Orchestra of Red Nichols and Paul Pendarvis. He also taught judo at a Police Department.

For a short time in 1939 Alsbrook belonged to the Duke Ellington Orchestra alongside Billy Taylor, before Jimmy Blanton joined the band. However, no recordings emerged from his time with the orchestra.

In the 1940s Alsbrook worked in the Seattle music scene, where he played with Ernestine Anderson From the mid-1950s, he starred in the R&B band of Earl Bostic, as well as Fats Domino ("Country Boy", Imperial 1960) and Amos Milburn. More recordings were made in Los Angeles with Jesse Belvin ("Where's My Girl", with Bumps Blackwell), Sam Cooke (1957), Ernie Freeman, and Sugarcane Harris. Tom Lord lists his participation in eight recording sessions 1956–57.

In 1972 Alsbrook made a guest appearance with Thelonious Monk's band when they played at Seattle's Fresh Air club.

His son is the musician Darryl Alsbrook.

== Recognition ==
The young Oscar Pettiford was impressed by Alsbrooks bass playing, as was Milt Hinton, who mentions Alsbrook in his memoirs. Charles Mingus and Gene Ramey have also praised Alsbrooks talent as a musician and arranger.
