= Just a Little Bit Better =

Single by Herman's Hermits

from the album The Best of Herman's Hermits
- B-side: UK B-side: "Take Love, Give Love"; US B-side: "Sea Cruise"
- Released: 27 August 1965 (UK); September 1965 (US)
- Recorded: De Lane Lea Studios, London, 16 July 1965
- Genre: Pop rock
- Length: 2:57
- Label: MGM 13398
- Songwriter: Kenny Young
- Producer: Mickie Most

Herman's Hermits singles chronology
"I'm Henry VIII, I Am" (1965)	"Just a Little Bit Better" (1965)	"A Must to Avoid" (1965)

"Just a Little Bit Better" is a song written by Kenny Young and released as a single under his name (ATCO Records 45–6322) in October 1964.

== History ==
A 1965 cover by Herman's Hermits reached No. 7 on the US Billboard Hot 100, No. 10 on the UK's New Musical Express chart, No. 15 on the UK's Record Retailer chart, and No. 9 on Canada's RPM Play Sheet. It also reached No. 1 in Malaysia, No. 7 in Sweden, No. 11 in New Zealand, and No. 40 in Australia. It was featured on their 1965 album, The Best of Herman's Hermits. It is also featured on their 1966 EP, A Must to Avoid. The Herman's Hermits recording was produced by Mickie Most.

Billboard described the song as a "smooth rocker with another clever set of lyrics and a Buddy Holly vocal sound," calling the song a "chartbuster." Cash Box described it as a "rhythmic, easy-going twangy ditty about a lad who makes a dramatic plea of devotion to the very special girl of his dreams."
