= Sleepy Joe (song) =

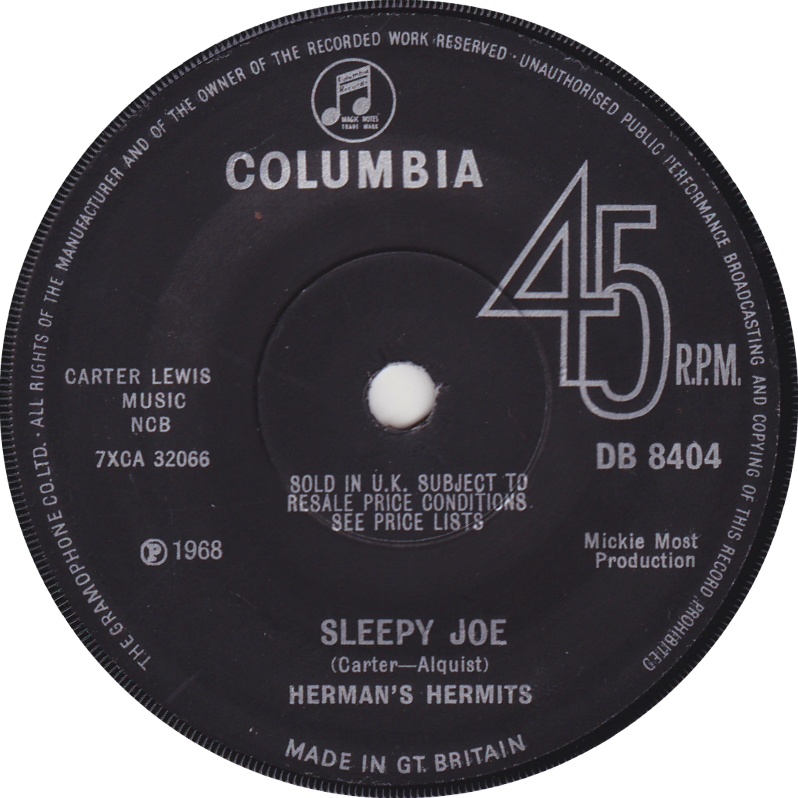

Single by Herman's Hermits
- B-side: "Just One Girl"
- Released: 19 April 1968 (UK); April 1968 (US)
- Recorded: De Lane Lea Studios, London, 8 December 1967
- Genre: Pop rock
- Length: 3:01
- Label: MGM 13934
- Songwriters: John Carter, Russell Alquist
- Producer: Mickie Most

Herman's Hermits singles chronology
"I Can Take or Leave Your Loving" (1967)	"Sleepy Joe" (1968)	"Sunshine Girl" (1968)

"Sleepy Joe" is a song written by John Carter, and Russell Alquist and performed by Herman's Hermits. It reached #4 in New Zealand, #9 in Canada and Ireland, #10 in Norway, #12 in the United Kingdom, #17 in Sweden, #18 in South Africa, #21 in Australia, #61 in the United States, and #37 in Australia in 1968.

Billboard described the single as a "clever and catchy rhythm material."

The song was produced by Mickie Most.
