= Music for Pleasure (record label) =

British budget record label

- Parent company: EMI (1971–1996)
- Founded: 1965
- Founder: EMI / International Publishing Corp.
- Defunct: 1996
- Genre: Various
- Country of origin: United Kingdom
- Location: London

Music for Pleasure (MFP) was a British budget record label launched in October 1965 as a joint venture between EMI, which provided catalogue material and pressing facilities, and the International Publishing Corporation, operating through Paul Hamlyn Holdings Ltd, which contributed expertise in non-traditional retail distribution. Albums retailed at 12 shillings and sixpence, approximately a third of the standard LP price.

The label was distributed primarily through non-traditional retail outlets, including supermarkets, newsagents, booksellers and department stores, and its launch introduced rack jobbing to the British record market. Initial stock consisted largely of deleted EMI back catalogue and EMI licensee material, supplemented by recordings licensed from American labels including Capitol, MGM and Walt Disney.

The venture exceeded expectations from the outset. Advance orders for the first release of 78 albums reached 500,000 before the October 1965 launch date, a figure described by EMI director Geoffrey Bridge as "beyond our wildest dreams". Demand was sufficient that EMI's Hayes pressing plant required supplementary production from Capitol's facility in Scranton, Pennsylvania, and from Pathé-Marconi in France.

The MFP catalogue consisted of both original material and reissues of existing EMI recordings, including records by "name" artists such as Kenny Rogers, the Beach Boys, Blondie, Pink Floyd, Jimi Hendrix, the Animals and the Beatles.

Original material included studio recordings of successful West End musicals, the first of which were recorded secretly for EMI by the young independent producer David Gooch (later producing Alma Cogan and Vera Lynn) who was given carte blanche to select three productions: these were South Pacific, Carousel and The Sound of Music, the last of which sold 250,000 copies. These albums were also manufactured for the Regal label in Canada. Some years later, they were re-recorded by Norman Newell.

During the late 1980s and early 1990s, MFP became the major budget-priced label in the UK, the label being run by Alec Sharman. Other notable sub-labels which were part of MFP included Classics for Pleasure (CFP) managed by Patricia Byrne, Listen for Pleasure (LFP) managed by Roger Godbald, a spoken word label and 'Fame' managed by Peter O'Cain which re-issued classic rock and pop albums from Queen, Paul McCartney, Marillion, and other successful EMI artists. All the labels moved from vinyl to cassette and finally to CDs, but when the CD market slowed in the mid-1990s MFP struggled to maintain sales in line with what was expected by the owner company EMI Records, so in 1995 the management team which had been led so successfully by Roger Woodhead was re-structured and Music for Pleasure became a sub label of the newly launched EMI Gold headed up by Paul Holland. The label continued with some measure of success with releases from classic artists such as Shirley Bassey, Nat King Cole, Cliff Richard, Dean Martin and even Classic Sing-A-Long Party CDs. In 1999 when Paul Holland left to join Granada, Steve Woof took over the running of the label.

Steve Woof and Jackie Fisher worked with an associated record label to MFP, EMI GOLD.

EMI Gold released a record on the MFP label in 1996. It was a project to capitalise on the success of the Easy Listening success of Mike Flowers Pops. The record was called "Cheesy Easy Listening: The Britpop Years" Performed by a made up artist "Geoff Parnell". Steve Deakin Davies was Geoff Parnell and the record was performed and produced for EMI by Steve Deakin Davies. It was a rare attempt by EMI Gold to put out a record reflecting current market tastes. Geoff Parnell, Cheesy Easy Listening: The Britpop years. MFP code CD MFP 6226 Tracking code 7243 8 52593 2 6. Steve Deakin Davies had a 4 album contract with EMI and he performed and produced the following albums. Father Liam's Irish Mist. This was originally going to be Father Ted's Irish Mist. Monsta Mash. EMI Gold released a Monsta Mash CD featuring the "Monsta Hokey Cokey" written and produced by Steve Deakin-Davies of "The Ambition Company".

The final album Geoff Parnell "Have you seen this man?" was never released.

The affiliated label Disky from the Netherlands was also licensed to re-release various EMI and King Biscuit Flower Hour releases in Europe. The Fame label reissued several Beatles, Pink Floyd and related albums in the 1980s.

The MFP label was briefly revived by EMI as a budget reissue label in the UK. One release was of Frank Sinatra. The subsequent sale of EMI to several competitors quietly ended MFP by 2012.

== Public perception ==
Similar in business model to the American Pickwick Records it would often attract attention due to the sound-alike records it produced.

== Notable releases ==
- The Pink Floyd compilation Relics was reissued on the MFP label as MFP 50397. It originally appeared on sister budget label Starline in the UK.
- Adamo compilation The Number One Continental Singer printed in 1967 UK - MFP label as MFP 1332.
- Kenny Rogers's second solo album was issued on MFP in the late 1980s, after the United Artists/Liberty labels deleted a lot of their albums. This was one of the few albums from that label to remain in print.
- Roger Whitaker released a record of children's songs titled The Magical World of Roger Whitaker that contained his well-known version of "Puff the Magic Dragon".
- The Beatles compilation double album, Rock 'n' Roll Music, was reissued on the Music for Pleasure label in 1980 as two separate single albums (MFP 50506 and MFP 50507). The live album The Beatles at the Hollywood Bowl was reissued on MFP in 1984.
- Several solo Beatles albums were issued on MFP: John Lennon's Mind Games and Rock 'n' Roll; George Harrison's Dark Horse and The Best of George Harrison, and Ringo Starr's Ringo and Blast from Your Past.
- The Beach Boys album Pet Sounds was released on MFP in Australia as The Fabulous Beach Boys (MFP A8090). Smiley Smile was also released as The Beach Boys or Good Vibrations (MFP A8138) the following year.
- In 1971, MFP issued compilations of the work of producer Mickie Most including The Most of The Animals (MFP 5218) and The Most of Herman's Hermits (MFP 5216). Both of these albums reached the top 20, the Herman's Hermits album becoming their highest-charting album in the UK.
- The 1972 MFP compilation Spirit Of Rock: The Probe Sampler contained licensed recordings from the Probe label, notably including the song "Dallas" by Steely Dan, which never appeared on an album or compilation. It was only otherwise available as a promo single at the time and years later on the EP Plus Fours. The cover of Spirit Of Rock claims that the song is taken from their first album Can't Buy A Thrill, but it was ultimately not included by the time the album came out later that year. The included version of Dallas is a fake stereo version made from the mono single version, and this mix remains exclusive to the compilation to this day.
- In 1973 Telltale released a full version of their intro song from Thames Television's Rainbow
- In parallel with the Top of the Pops albums issued by Pickwick, MFP issued a series of LPs in the early 1970s containing anonymous cover versions of current hits. Called Hot Hits, the series ran to 20 before folding. They were eligible for listing in the UK LP charts for a few months in 1971, and four charted: Volume 5 registered for a solitary week at number 48 as sales were dwindling; Volume 6 topped the album charts for a week in August, and volumes 7 and 8 peaked at 3 and 2 respectively. Thereafter the albums were disqualified again. MFP also issued a plethora of spin-offs based on the "hits" theme (e.g. "Smash Hits", "Hit Hits", "Soul Hits" MFP 1280, "Million Seller Hits" etc.) "Hot Hits 6" remains MFP's most successful release on chart, and their only number 1 album. One compilation which was of good quality is called Junior Hits. It contained songs by Jimmy Webb and Rolf Harris and sold well in 1970.
- In 1980, MFP released the song "There's No One Quite Like Grandma" by the St Winifred's School Choir.
- The label also claimed a first by releasing Sinatra Sings Music For Pleasure featuring tracks from Frank Sinatra's Capitol albums.

== See also ==
- List of record labels
