= Mrs. Brown, You've Got a Lovely Daughter =

1965 single by Herman's Hermits

Single by Tom Courtenay
- B-side: "Knocking on the Door"
- Released: 30 August 1963
- Label: Decca
- Songwriter: Trevor Peacock
- Producers: Jack Good; Peter Attwood

"Mrs. Brown, You've Got a Lovely Daughter" is a popular song written by British actor, screenwriter and songwriter Trevor Peacock. Peacock originally performed the song in The Lads, a 1963 television play which aired on the ITV Television Playhouse series. The song was subsequently recorded by actor Tom Courtenay, who released his own version as a single that year. In 1965, Herman's Hermits' version of the song became a hit single in the US, reaching number one on the Billboard Hot 100.

== Tom Courtenay version ==
The song was originally performed by Trevor Peacock in The Lads, a television play for ATV. The play was broadcast on 15 August 1963 as part of the ITV Television Playhouse series. Tom Courtenay, who had starred in the play, recorded his own version of the song as a single. Courtenay stated, "I just did it because I was in the play and I thought the songs were nice. I don't think I'll make any other records, but you never know". On 16 August, Courtenay appeared as a guest on Ready, Steady, Go!, where he commented "I don't mind a bit" upon being asked about the single's chance of success.

=== Release and reception ===
Decca Records released Courtenay's rendition of "Mrs. Brown, You've Got A Lovely Daughter" on 30 August 1963, with "Knocking on the Door" as the B-side. "Knocking on the Door" was another song featured in the play.

Disker of the Liverpool Echo and Evening Express noted that the song "strikes a perky note somewhere between folk-singing and music-hall with just the right sprinkling of sadness about its lyrics". Peter Blackman of the Lincolnshire Echo wrote that the single was "[u]nlikely to hit the jackpot, but makes good light relief from the usual guitar-twanging rat racers". Andy Lothian of The Courier and Advertiser wrote, "Without the visual setting the song loses much of its appeal", and described the single overall as a "disappointing double".

== Herman's Hermits' version ==
"Mrs. Brown, You've Got a Lovely Daughter"

Single by Herman's Hermits

from the album Herman's Hermits
- B-side: "I Gotta Dream On"
- Released: April 1965
- Recorded: De Lane Lea Studios, London, 1 December 1964
- Genre: Beat; pop; music hall
- Length: 2:45
- Label: MGM
- Songwriter: Trevor Peacock
- Producer: Mickie Most

Herman's Hermits singles chronology
"Silhouettes" (1965)	"Mrs. Brown, You've Got a Lovely Daughter" (1965)	"Wonderful World" (1965)

The best-known version of the song is by Herman's Hermits, who took it to number one on the US Billboard Hot 100 in May 1965, and number one in Canada the month before. The group never released the track—or their other US 1965 number one, "I'm Henry VIII, I Am"—as a single in their native Britain.

=== Background ===
Herman's Hermits' version of "Mrs. Brown, You've Got a Lovely Daughter" was recorded as an afterthought in two takes and featured unique muted lead and rhythm guitar by Derek Leckenby and Keith Hopwood and heavily accented lead vocals by Peter Noone, with backing vocals from Karl Green and Keith Hopwood. Peter Noone discovered the song while attempting to record audio directly from the television with a tape recorder. Herman's Hermits quickly adopted the song for their live act. In a 1972 interview, Noone recounted,

'Mrs. Brown' worked especially well for non-rock 'n' roll gigs, like weddings and bar mitzvahs. Older people would hear it and uncover their ears and think, 'Oh, great, there's a song we can deal with.' We would change the name to the host's, like 'Mrs. Silverman, You've Got a Lovely Daughter.'

— Peter Noone

The group recorded the track for their first US album, which was released by MGM Records in February 1965. Noone stated, "We had eleven songs and we needed a twelfth. Mickie was one hundred percent against recording 'Mrs. Brown.' It was the only other song we could do." The group and their producer Mickie Most were initially hesitant to release the song as a single. Most later said the song was "probably the worst record ever made, or at least the worst one I've been associated with".

=== Release ===
When the song attracted attention from disc jockeys, the group's US label, MGM Records, approached Mickie Most with the intent of releasing it as a single, and offered to pay him for advance sales of 600,000 copies. Most agreed to the release if MGM could guarantee advance sales of one million copies. The single debuted on the Hot 100 at number twelve—the third highest debut of the decade (after the Beatles' "Hey Jude" and "Get Back", which both debuted at number ten). As "Mrs. Brown" was released in the US only a few weeks after their previous single, "Silhouettes", both songs ended up occupying the top 10 simultaneously, with "Silhouettes" peaking at number five.

"Mrs. Brown" was certified Gold by the RIAA on 16 June 1965, and eventually sold three million copies worldwide.

In the UK, the song first appeared on the EP of the same title in June, and was also issued on the group's first album for Columbia. The song appeared in the 1968 MGM film of the same name starring Herman's Hermits, and its corresponding soundtrack album.

=== Critical reception ===
Billboard praised Herman's Hermits' version of the song, calling it a "strong folk-flavored teen ballad". Cash Box described the song as "a twangy, rhythmic low-key tale about a lad whose gal gives him the gate".

In 1966, the song was nominated for Best Performance By a Vocal Group and Best Contemporary (R&R) Performance - Group (Vocal Or Instrumental) at the 8th Annual Grammy Awards.

In a retrospective review of the song, William Ruhlmann of AllMusic described it as "an interesting twist on the usual romantic themes of pop songs." Tom Breihan of Stereogum rated the song 3/10 and described it as "an amiable and ambling little nothing", adding "In some small way, it's amazing that a song this flat and unassuming could've hit the way it did."

=== Charts ===
Chart performance for "Mrs. Brown, You've Got a Lovely Daughter"
Chart (1965)	Peak position
Australia (Kent Music Report)	1
Canada R.P.M. Play Sheet	1
US Billboard Hot 100	1
US Cash Box Top 100	1

== Other versions ==
Alvin and the Chipmunks covered the song for their 1965 album Chipmunks à Go-Go. Nellie McKay recorded the song for her 2015 album My Weekly Reader.

Several answer songs to "Mrs. Brown" were released in the wake of the single's success, including Lynn & the Mersey Maids' "Mrs. Jones, Your Son Gives Up Too Easy" on RIC, "Mrs. Schwartz, You've Got An Ugly Daughter" by Marty and the Monks on Associated Artists, and "A Frightful Situation" by Mrs. Brown's Lovely Daughter Carol on Challenge Records.
