= I'm into Something Good =

Single by Herman's Hermits

from the album Herman's Hermits
- B-side: "Your Hand in Mine"
- Released: 7 August 1964 (UK); September 1964 (US)
- Recorded: De Lane Lea Studios, London, 26 July 1964
- Genre: Pop
- Length: 2:25
- Label: MGM K13280 (US); Columbia DB 7338 (UK)
- Composer: Carole King
- Lyricist: Gerry Goffin
- Producer: Mickie Most

Herman's Hermits singles chronology
"I'm into Something Good" (1964)	"Show Me Girl" (1964)

"I'm into Something Good" is a song composed by Gerry Goffin (lyrics) and Carole King (music) and made famous by Herman's Hermits. It was originally recorded (as "I'm into Somethin' Good") by Cookies member Earl-Jean on Colpix Records in 1964. Her version entered the U.S. Cash Box Top 100 charts in the US on 4 July 1964 and spent eight weeks there, reaching a high of number 42 on 15 August 1964, and number 38 Billboard.

On 26 July 1964, Herman's Hermits recorded the song as their debut single. It reached number 1 in the UK Singles Chart on 30 September 1964, staying there for two weeks. It peaked at number 13 in the US later that year and number 7 in Canada. The 'A' section of the song follows a twelve-bar blues structure.

This Herman's Hermits' release, during the peak of the British Invasion, occurred at a time when Brill Building songwriters, like Goffin and King in this case, found themselves in danger of obsolescence, as most of the British groups wrote their own material. The song has since been featured in films such as The Naked Gun: From the Files of Police Squad! and The Brave Little Toaster to the Rescue. The song was also featured in the television shows Crystal Lake and Family Guy.

Carole King has said that in writing the song, she was inspired by Brian Wilson: "I make no bones about it, that song was influenced by Brian's music".

== Chart history ==
Earl-Jean/The Cookies

Chart (1964)	Peak position
U.S. Billboard Hot 100	38
U.S. Cashbox Top 100	42

Herman's Hermits

Chart (1964–65)	Peak position
Australia (Kent Music Report)	11
Canada RPM Top Singles	7
Ireland (IRMA)	1
New Zealand (Lever Hit Parade)	7
Sweden	5
UK	1
U.S. Billboard Hot 100	13
U.S. Cashbox Top 100	7

== Personnel (Herman's Hermits) ==
- Peter Noone – vocals
- Derek Leckenby – lead guitar
- Keith Hopwood – rhythm guitar
- Karl Green – bass
- Barry Whitwam – drums

== Cover versions ==
The song was featured in the 1988 film The Naked Gun: From the Files of Police Squad!. From its inclusion in the soundtrack, a solo version by Herman's Hermits frontman Peter Noone climbed the adult contemporary chart that year.

It was featured in the 1997 film The Brave Little Toaster to the Rescue, in the opening credits and also when the Master puts the WFC 11-12-55 into Radio and turns him on.

Brian Wilson recorded a version which features Carole King, and it is included in the Best Buy edition of his 2008 album, That Lucky Old Sun.

The Bird and the Bee released the song as a single in March 2010. Their version was also included on the soundtrack for the film, Valentine's Day and television Love Bites show season 1 episode 6 "TMI."

The television sitcom The Partridge Family featured it in 1973, with lead vocals by David Cassidy. This cover, produced by Wes Farrell, appeared twice during the fourth season. However, it was never officially released on either vinyl or CD.

Another version was recorded as part of The Langley Schools Music Project in 1976.

Using the title "Something Good", Marianne Faithfull included the song her 2002 album Kissin Time. It featured Billy Corgan as a guest musician.

The song was included on the CD release of Janis Siegel's 1982 album, Experiment in White.

In 2020, the famous party band The Gypsy Queens recorded it and made it the first single of their album Reminiscing with Friends (2022), in Los Angeles, at The Village Studios, Featuring the original Herman's Hermits lead singer Peter Noone, and produced by multiple Grammy winner producer Larry Klein. It was released 12 February 2021, under the label Sonico Productions.

In 2021, the animated series F Is for Family featured an unpracticed rendition of the song in season 5, episode 2.

== Football song ==
The song, with adapted lyrics, has been adopted as an anthem by fans of Manchester United F.C., F.C. United of Manchester, Portsmouth F.C. and Coventry City F.C.

== Herman's Hermits performance credits ==
Barry Whitwam has stated that the Hermits themselves played on the track, not Jimmy Page, since Mickie Most and former lead singer "Herman" (Peter Noone) had implied otherwise after having lost the rights to the band's name. Whitwam further states, in regard to exaggerations of songs on which they supposedly did not play:

"Everything he says is that it was Jimmy Page, and Jimmy Page probably can't remember any of the songs that he played. If you look at our top ten in America, "I'm into Something Good", it was us. All Hermits. There was only a piano added on. That was on a two-track machine, so we played at the same time. That got to number thirteen. “Can't You Hear My Heartbeat”, there were no other instruments. That got to number two. "Mrs. Brown You've Got a Lovely Daughter" got to number one. "I'm Henry the VIII". Number one. "A Must to Avoid". Number eight. "Listen People". "Leaning on the Lamppost". That's six in the top ten with Jimmy Page or anybody else not involved! Another seventy of the tracks on the albums is only the Hermits. I think I worked it out, and I think in only thirty percent of all the songs ever recorded, the Hermits didn't do the backing, but the Hermits were always on the vocals doing the harmonies. So he's trying to discredit us, saying that we didn't have anything to do with anything."
