= I'm Henery the Eighth, I Am =

1910 music hall song, signature of Harry Champion

"I'm Henry the Eighth, I Am"

Song by Harry Champion
- Written: 1910
- Genre: Music hall
- Songwriters: Fred Murray; R. P. Weston

"I'm Henry VIII, I Am"

Single by Herman's Hermits

from the album Herman's Hermits and Their Second Album! Herman's Hermits on Tour
- B-side: "The End of the World"
- Released: June 1965 (US); September 1965 (UK)
- Recorded: De Lane Lea Studios, London, 1 February 1965
- Genre: Rock and roll; music hall
- Length: 1:50
- Label: EMI
- Songwriters: Fred Murray; R. P. Weston
- Producer: Mickie Most

Herman's Hermits singles chronology
"Wonderful World" (1965)	"I'm Henry VIII, I Am" (1965)	"Just a Little Bit Better" (1965)

"I'm Henery the Eighth, I Am" (also "I'm Henery the VIII, I Am" or "I'm Henry VIII, I Am"; spelled "Henery" but pronounced "'Enery" in the Cockney style normally used to sing it) is a 1910 British music hall song by Fred Murray and R. P. Weston. It was a signature song of the music hall star Harry Champion.

Joe Brown included the song on his first album A Picture of You in 1962. In 1965, it became the fastest-selling song in history to that point when it was revived by Herman's Hermits, becoming the group's second number-one on the Billboard Hot 100 chart, dethroning "(I Can't Get No) Satisfaction" by the Rolling Stones. Despite that success, the single was not released in the UK. The Herman's Hermits version is a very short song, one of the shortest ever to be a number-one single in the US.

In the well-known chorus, Henery explains that his wife had been married seven times before, each time to another Henery:

I'm 'Enery the Eighth, I am,
'Enery the Eighth I am, I am!
I got married to the widow next door,
She's been married seven times before
And every one was an 'Enery
She wouldn't have a Willie nor a Sam
I'm her eighth old man named 'Enery
'Enery the Eighth, I am!

However, in the Hermits' version, Peter Noone ends each chorus with "I'm her eighth old man, I'm 'Enery" and never sings "named".

== Harry Champion version ==
According to one source, Champion "used to fire off [the chorus] at tremendous speed with almost desperate gusto, his face bathed in sweat and his arms and legs flying in all directions." In later versions recorded by Champion, "Willie" is changed to "William" because the former is a British slang term for "penis."

== Joe Brown version ==
In 1961, this song was recorded and extensively performed live by the British star Joe Brown, who revived the song and made it largely known in the British pop world. His version has two choruses either side of his guitar solo (B-side, Piccadilly Records 7N 35005). George Harrison was a fan of Brown's and sang the song as part of the Beatles' early repertoire. The group never recorded their version. To the present day, Brown often performs it in concert.

== Herman's Hermits version ==
The rock and roll stylings of the song gave Herman's Hermits their second US number one hit in 1965; like the Brown arrangement, it contains only the chorus (and none of the three verses) of the original. As a result, the tune is a mere one minute and fifty seconds long, one of the shortest-ever songs to top the Billboard singles chart. In their short and fast take of the song, the guitar and bass are considered proto-punk and were a direct influence on the Ramones; indeed, their song "Judy Is A Punk" includes the line "Second verse, same as the first" as in the Hermits' tune. The speedy guitar work at the break by lead guitarist Derek Leckenby evokes Chuck Berry sonically (e. g. “Johnny B. Goode”) then memorably shifts into quoting the melody. Billboard praised the song's "strong dance beat and vocal performance."

They performed the song on Hullabaloo as well as The Ed Sullivan Show. This version was also performed on the third-season premiere of The Jimmy Dean Show with Jimmy Dean and Jim Henson's Rowlf the Dog wearing wigs, three months after Herman's performance on Sullivan.

== Charts ==
=== Weekly charts ===
Chart (1965)	Peak position
Australia	27
Canada RPM Top Singles	2
New Zealand (Lever Hit Parade)	2
South Africa (Springbok)	15
Sweden	3
US Billboard Hot 100	1
US Cash Box Top 100	1

=== Year-end charts ===
Chart (1965)	Rank
US Billboard Hot 100	46
US Cash Box Top 100	56

== Other versions ==
Connie Francis recorded a version for her 1966 album Connie Francis and The Kids Next Door.

== Title and lyrics ==
The song is traditionally sung in a Cockney accent. Earlier sources usually spell the name "Henery" (as do some old sources when referring to the historical King of England and Ireland), and the music requires the name "Henery" (or "'Enery") to be pronounced as three syllables. The sheet music for the 1965 Herman's Hermits revival, however, presented the name as "Henry", as do sources referring to this version.

In the Herman's Hermits version, the band sings the lyrics three times. Between the first two choruses, Peter Noone calls out, "Second verse, same as the first!" The background singers on the version recorded by Connie Francis use this call as well.

== In popular culture ==
- In the Flanders and Swann song "Greensleeves" (in which the duo purport to tell the tale of the classic song's creation), the monarch himself claims to be the true author of the piece, stating "We are Henry VIII, we are!"
- In the 1990 film Ghost, Sam (Patrick Swayze) sings this song on a continuous run in a bad Cockney London accent all night long, to Oda Mae Brown (Whoopi Goldberg) to annoy her into helping him.
- Homer Simpson - in the persona of Henry VIII - sings a parody of this song in The Simpsons 2004 episode "Margical History Tour", with the lyrics referencing Henry's voracious appetite.
- Alvin and the Chipmunks covered this song.
- The original Harry Champion version of the song was used as the titles music of The Libertines 2012 music documentary There Are No Innocent Bystanders.

== See also ==
- Henry VIII
- Cultural depictions of Henry VIII
