= Peter Noone =

English singer-songwriter and actor (born 1947)

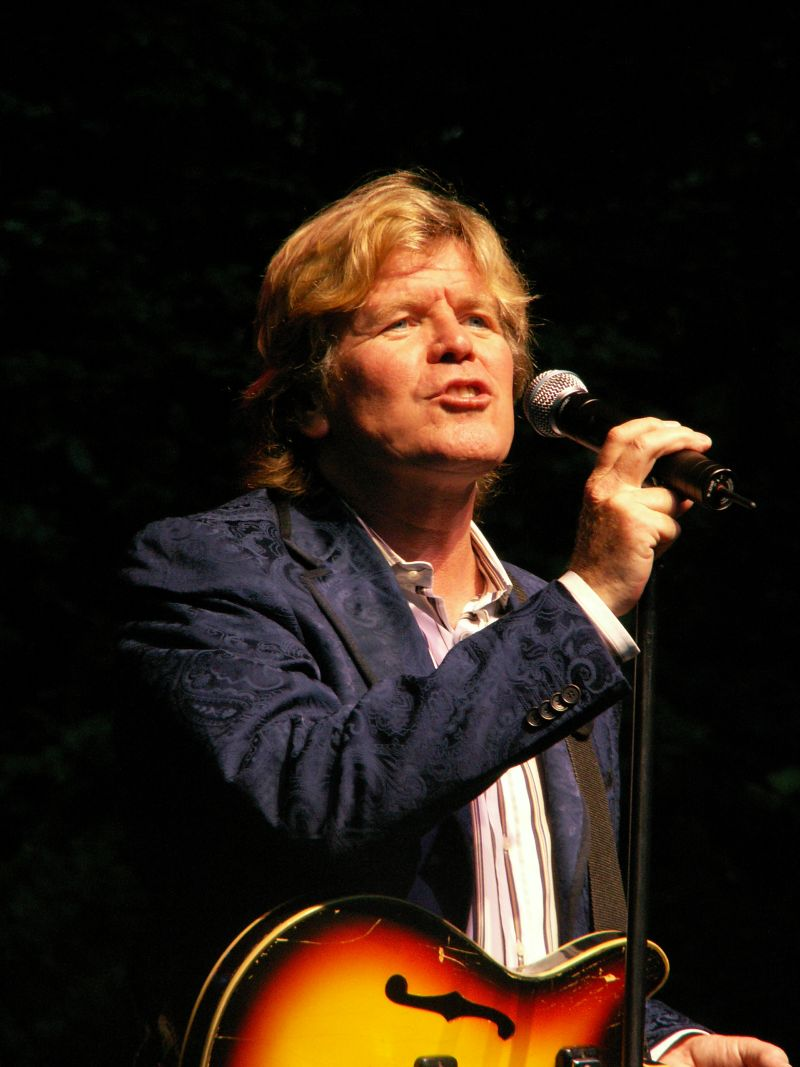
- Noone (2007)

Background information
- Also known as: Herman
- Born: Peter Blair Denis Bernard Noone; 5 November 1947 (age 79); Davyhulme, Lancashire, England
- Genres: Rock, pop
- Occupations: Musician; singer-songwriter; musician; actor
- Instruments: Vocals, guitar
- Years active: 1962–present
- Labels: RAK, Philips, Bus Stop (UK); Bell, Philips (US)
- Spouse: Mireille Strasser (m. 1968)
- Website: Official website

Peter Blair Denis Bernard Noone (born 5 November 1947) is an English singer-songwriter, musician, actor, and teen idol. He was the lead singer "Herman" in the 1960s pop group Herman's Hermits and continues to tour as the lead singer for Herman's Hermits starring Peter Noone.

== Early life ==
Noone was born in Davyhulme, Lancashire, England, the second of five children, the son of two accountants, and attended English Martyrs (Urmston), Wellacre Primary School (Flixton), Stretford Grammar School, and St Bede's College, Manchester. In an interview, Noone made this comment about his early years: "My parents had zero input in my career other than to teach me to be independent and to always be honest, steadfast and true and I was steadfast often. I was able to have a perfectly normal teen life ..."

Noone studied voice and drama at St Bede's College and at the Manchester School of Music, where he won the Outstanding Young Musician Award.

== Career ==
=== Herman's Hermits ===
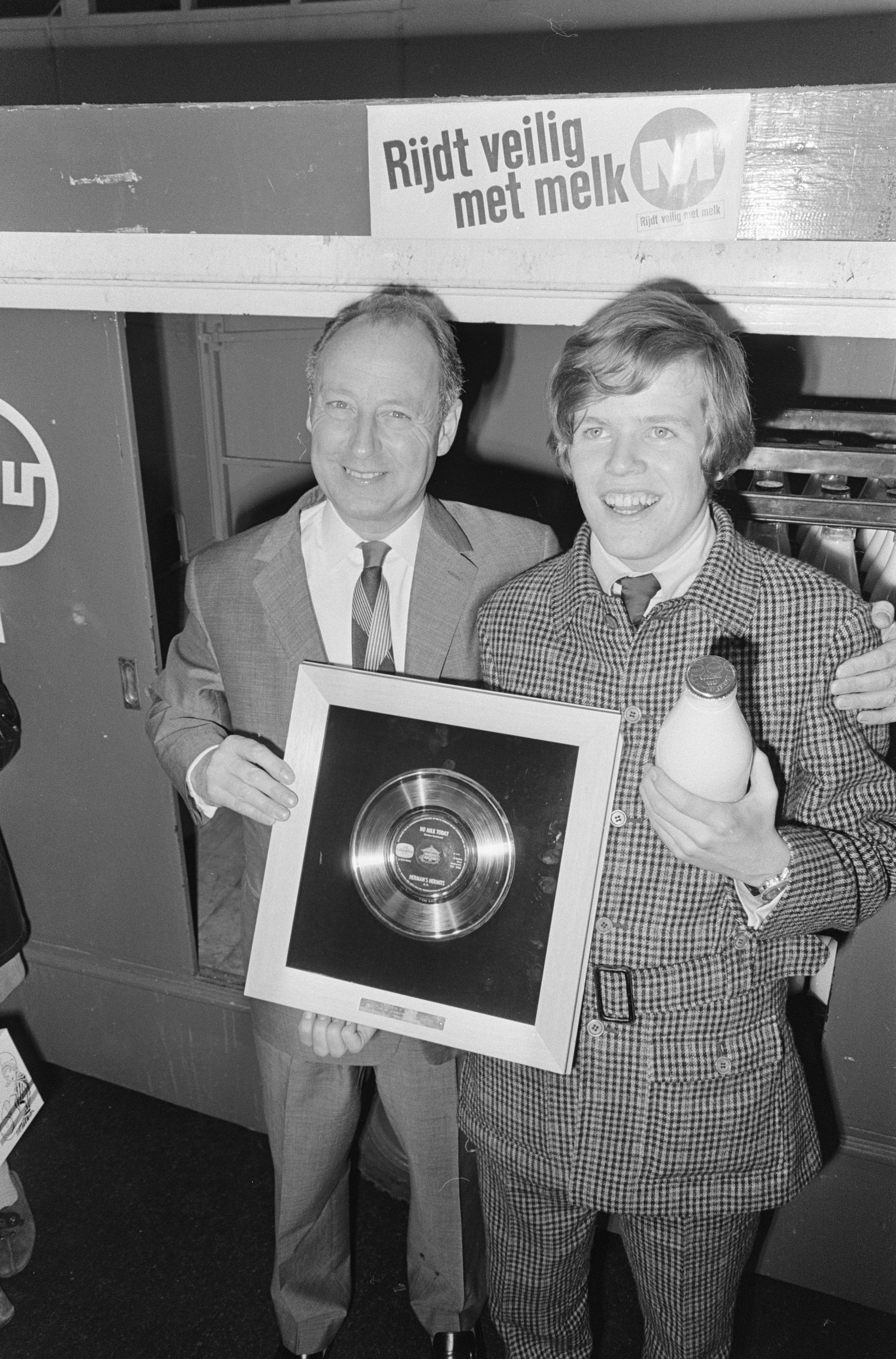
Noone being presented with a gold disc for "No Milk Today"

Early in his career, he used the stage name Peter Novac. At 15, he became the lead singer, spokesman and frontman of Herman's Hermits, who were discovered by Harvey Lisberg. As "Herman", Noone appeared on the cover of many international publications, including Time Magazine's 1965 collage showing new faces in popular music. The Hermits consisted of Noone, Derek "Lek" Leckenby and Keith Hopwood (guitars), Karl Green (bass) and Barry Whitwam (drums).

The band's hits included: "I'm into Something Good", "Can't You Hear My Heartbeat", "Mrs. Brown, You've Got a Lovely Daughter", "Silhouettes", "Wonderful World", "I'm Henry the Eighth, I Am" (in the US), "There's a Kind of Hush", "Just a Little Bit Better", "A Must to Avoid", "Listen People", "The End of the World", "Dandy", and "No Milk Today". Herman's Hermits sold more than 60 million records and had 14 gold singles and seven gold albums. The Hermits were twice named in the US trade paper Cashbox as "Entertainer of the Year".

As Herman, Noone performed on hundreds of television programmes and appeared with the Ed Sullivan, Jackie Gleason, Dean Martin and Danny Kaye television programs. He starred in ABC's musical version of The Canterville Ghost, Hallmark Hall of Fame's presentation of the classic Pinocchio (in which he played the title role), and three feature films for MGM: Mrs. Brown, You've Got A Lovely Daughter, Hold On! and When The Boys Meet The Girls.

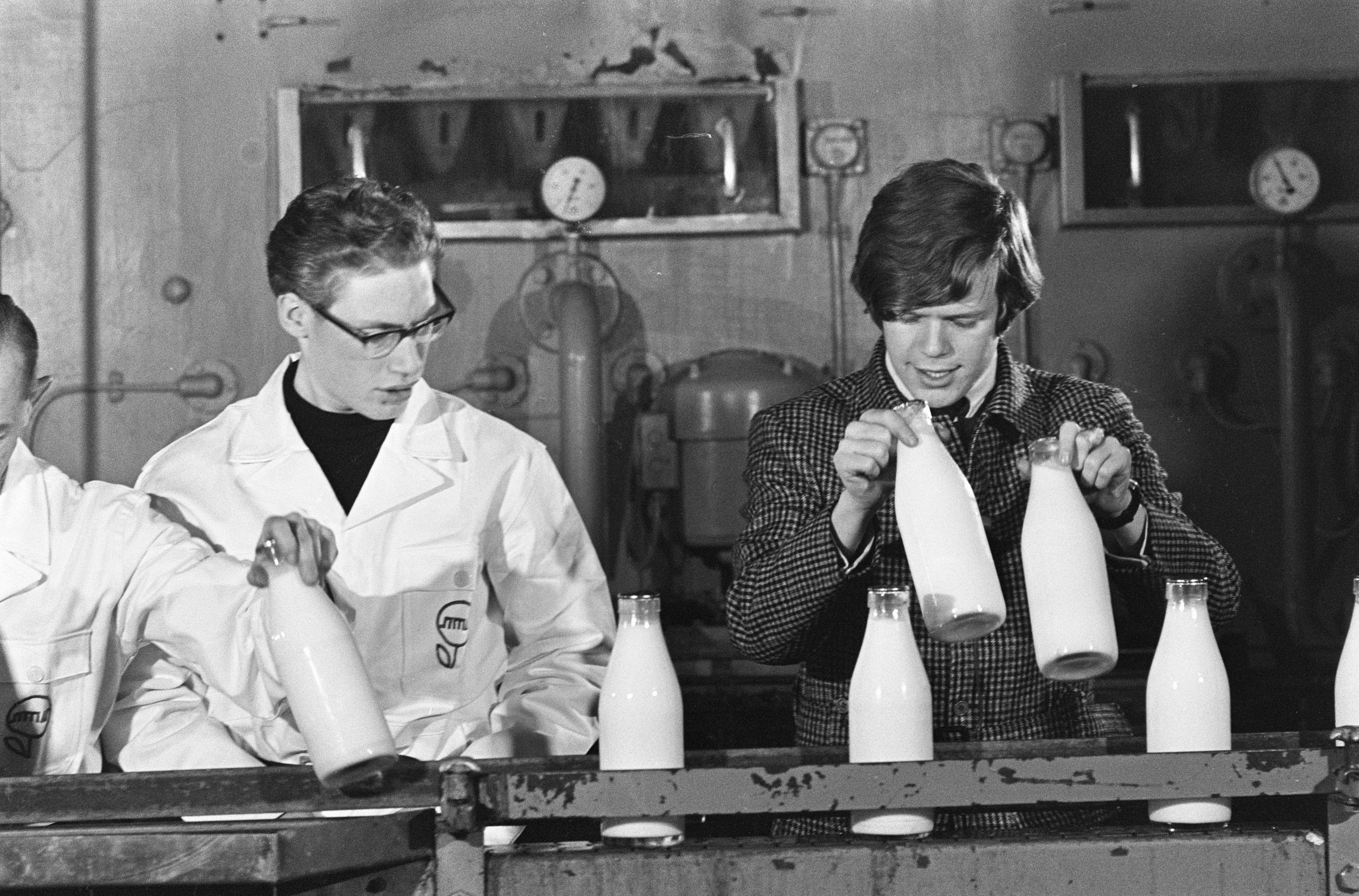
Noone at a dairy in the Netherlands, after his band was awarded a gold record for "No Milk Today" in 1966

They were the opening act of the 1970 Royal Variety Performance from the London Palladium performing a medley of their hits to date followed by their rendition of "If I Were a Rich Man", "Where is Love?" and "Old Henry's Fish and Chips". They ended with their recent hit "There's a Kind of Hush".

=== Solo work ===
After Herman's Hermits disbanded in 1971, Noone recorded four singles for UK RAK Records, one single for UK and US Philips, and several singles for the small UK record label, Bus Stop Records. His first RAK single, "Oh You Pretty Thing", peaked at No.12 in the UK Singles Chart and No. 100 in Australia. It was written by David Bowie, who also played piano on the track. Noone told NME: "My view is that David Bowie is the best writer in Britain at the moment ... certainly the best since Lennon and McCartney." Noone appeared as a guest on The Sonny & Cher Comedy Hour television show, Season 4, Episode 11, originally broadcast on November 28, 1973 when he performed "I'm Henry the Eighth, I Am".

In 1974, Noone scored a No. 15 US AC and No. 33 Canadian AC success with "Meet Me on the Corner Down at Joe's Cafe" on the Casablanca Records label. Earlier in the year, his "(I Think I'm Over) Getting Over You" had reached No. 63 in the Canadian AC charts. In 1989 he had a No. 19 US AC hit with his solo recording of Goffin and King's "I'm into Somethin' Good" from the film The Naked Gun: From the Files of Police Squad!.

On 2 March 1982, Noone released his first solo album "One of the Glory Boys" through Johnston Records, produced by Spencer Proffer and backed by Bruce Johnston, Matt Andes, Jimmy Johnson, Art Wood, Steve Hunter, Richard Bennett, Randy Kerber, Randy Bishop, Emilio Castillo, Mic Gillette, Stephen Kupka, Rick Waychesko, Larry Brown, Devin Payne, Arlan Day, Bart Bishop, Jude Cole, Carmen Appice. Horn arrangements were credited to the Tower of Power. In a contemporary review, critics emphasized Noone's "verve, savvy, and charm." The album was noted for its polished production and effective sound. A reviewer in the November 1982 HiFi/Stereo Review highlighted Noone's "zip and dash" and the interpretations of "If You Gotta Make a Fool of Somebody" and "Give Me Just a Little More Time" which were singled out as particularly strong, with the reviewer noting that these selections suited his vocal style and expressive strengths. While it was suggested that certain material did not fully showcase his abilities, the review overall underscored his charisma, vocal versatility, and enduring performance skills.

In the 1990s, Noone hosted a television programme, My Generation, on VH1 (British and Irish TV channel), featuring retro music; the programme lasted four years.

As an actor, Noone played a number of roles on television, including that of Stanley Fairclough in the soap opera Coronation Street, leaving that role in 1961. Noone also starred as Frederick in The Pirates of Penzance on Broadway in the 1980s, and later, at the Drury Lane Theatre in London's West End. He reprised that role again during a US tour and international touring productions. He also appeared in Romance/Romance as Alfred Von Wilmers in the U.S. National Tour of the Broadway hit.

In 2019, Noone won the "Entertainer of the Year" award at the Casino Entertainment Awards, held at the Hard Rock Hotel & Casino, beating out nominees Barry Manilow and Dwight Yoakam.

=== The Tremblers ===
Noone led a short-lived group called the Tremblers that toured in 1980 and released one album, Twice Nightly. Along with Noone, the members of the band were Greg Inhofer (keyboards), Robert Williams (drums, formerly with the Pop), George Conner (lead guitar), and Mark Browne (bass). According to the liner notes of the album, several musicians provided "licks & tricks," including members of Tom Petty's Heartbreakers, Elton John's backing band, Daryl Dragon, Phil Seymour and Dave Clark. Modern Recording magazine reviewed the album unfavourably, maintaining that the music bogged down in "power pop careening into bubblegum" songs that were not different enough from each other: adolescent lyrics delivered at the same fast tempo, recorded with an uninteresting, barely stereo sound field. In retrospective interviews, Noone described The Tremblers album as an especially collaborative project featuring contributions from these musicians as well as from other well-known musicians, including Steve Allen of 20/20, Bill Pitcock IV of the Dwight Twilley Band, guitarist Mike Campbell who was a member of Tom Petty and the Heartbreakers, and members of Elton John's touring band: Phil Solem of The Rembrandts, and the late Phil Seymour. Noone characterized the sessions as reflective of an earlier studio ethos in which musicians freely contributed creative ideas without seeking songwriting credit. He cited Campbell's guitar work on "Steady Eddy" as significantly reshaping the track, noting that Campbell declined co-writing credit despite his contributions. Noone later suggested that the album's brisk production schedule may have limited further refinement, explaining that the band intentionally pursued an unapologetically pop-oriented sound at a time when many contemporary groups were adopting a heavier rock style. He has also expressed interest in the possibility of reissuing the album with unreleased material recorded for a proposed second Tremblers release, noting the continued audience for vintage power-pop recordings.

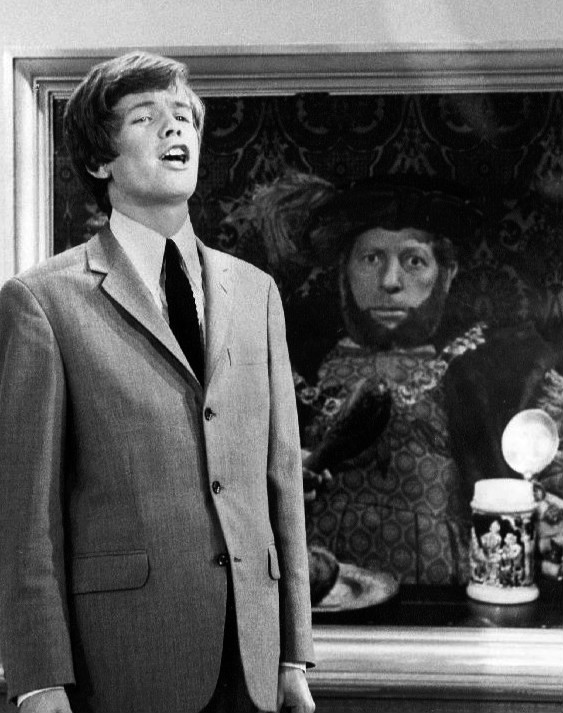
Noone sings "Henry the VIII" on The Danny Kaye Show, as Kaye appears in the king's portrait.

=== SiriusXM ===
As of January 2023, Noone hosted a weekly, three hour programme of 1960s music and reminiscences on SiriusXM's 60s Gold station titled "Something Good", titled after the hit song, "I'm into Something Good". In interviews, Noone has stated that his association with Sirius XM began after he performed at a benefit concert in New York City. Appearing with only an accompanying guitarist, he performed a selection of songs and included an impromptu rendition of "Ferry Cross to Jersey," inspired by the 1965 Gerry and the Pacemakers song "Ferry Cross the Mersey", as a ferry passed near the Port of New York. According to Noone, Sirius XM producers in attendance subsequently approached him about hosting his own program. Noone curates playlists drawn from a catalogue of several hundred songs and recording short conversational segments between tracks. He has described the program as a project undertaken primarily for enjoyment rather than as a commercial venture.

On June 2, 2026, Noone opened "The Peter Noone Collection", a password protected, digital career archive containing photographs, memorabilia, music, videos, and other materials from his personal collection. Access to the archive is provided as a benefit of membership in the Peter Noone Fan Club.

=== Herman's Hermits revived ===
Since the 1980s, Noone has performed under the name Herman's Hermits starring Peter Noone. In 2023, the group was scheduled to perform 108 concerts "mostly in the USA, Canada and Mexico. Some UK, some France." Herman's Hermits Starring Peter Noone performed 112 concerts in 2024, and in 2025 118 concerts.

== Personal life ==
Noone married Mireille Strasser on 5 November 1968, his twenty-first birthday, and has one daughter.
