= Can't You Hear My Heartbeat =

Single by Herman's Hermits

from the album Their Second Album! Herman's Hermits on Tour
- B-side: "I Know Why"
- Released: 11 January 1965
- Recorded: 1 December 1964
- Studio: De Lane Lea, London
- Genre: Pop rock
- Length: 2:15
- Label: MGM (US); Columbia (UK)
- Songwriters: John Carter, Ken Lewis
- Producer: Mickie Most

Herman's Hermits singles chronology
"I'm into Something Good" (1964)	"Can't You Hear My Heartbeat" (1965)	"Silhouettes" (1965)

"Can't You Hear My Heartbeat" is a song written by John Carter and Ken Lewis, produced by Mickie Most, and performed by Herman's Hermits. It reached No. 2 on the Billboard Hot 100, and no. 1 in the Cashbox charts, in 1965.

In the United Kingdom it was released as the B-Side of "Silhouettes". The song was featured on their 1965 album, Their Second Album! Herman's Hermits on Tour.

Billboard magazine's Top Hot 100 songs of 1965 ranked it No.8.

== Other versions ==
- Goldie & the Gingerbreads, as a single in 1965. That March, it reached No.25 on Record Retailer's singles chart and No. 30 in Melody Maker.
- Marianne Faithfull, on her 1965 debut album Marianne Faithfull.
