= Derek Leckenby =

English pop and rock musician (1943–1994)

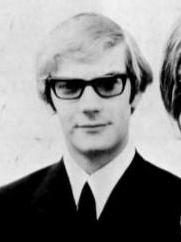
- Derek Leckenby in 1968

Background information
- Born: 14 May 1943; Leeds, England
- Died: 4 June 1994 (aged 51) Manchester, England
- Genres: Pop, rock
- Instrument: Guitar
- Years active: 1958–1994

Derek "Lek" Leckenby (14 May 1943 – 4 June 1994) was an English musician and lead guitarist, most famous for his work with English pop group Herman's Hermits.

== Life and career ==
Leckenby was born on 14 May 1943 in Leeds. He was educated at William Hulme's Grammar School, Manchester, and commenced a civil engineering degree course at Manchester University before leaving to become a professional musician. Leckenby was performing with his own group, the Wailers, when music manager Harvey Lisberg recruited him for Herman's Hermits. Drummer Barry Whitwam was also recruited from the Wailers. Leckenby was the oldest member of the group at age 21 when their first single, "I'm Into Something Good", was released. He played lead guitar with the group.

Leckenby and bandmate Keith Hopwood often contributed background vocals to the group's songs. Leckenby has been credited with providing the guitar solo to the group's version of "I'm Henry VIII, I Am". In 1968, Leckenby and Hopwood co-founded Pluto Music, which produced music soundtracks. Leckenby was also a member of the New Wave Band, which included Eric Stewart, Graham Gouldman, and Philip Cohen. In 1970, the group recorded a cover of Simon & Garfunkel's "Cecilia" for Major Minor.

Leckenby married Leonie Rosenbloom on 2 July 1968. The couple had two daughters.

== Death ==
Leckenby was diagnosed with non-Hodgkin lymphoma in 1992. He died from the disease on 4 June 1994 at the age of 51. He had become sick while on tour with Herman's Hermits a few days prior. At the time of his death, Leckenby resided in Osbourne Grove, Gatley.

Leckenby's funeral was held at Southern Cemetery in Manchester on 9 June. Attendees included members of Herman's Hermits, as well as Mungo Jerry, Dave Dee, Wayne Fontana, the Mindbenders, and the Dakotas.
