= Keith Hopwood =

English pop musician (born 1946)

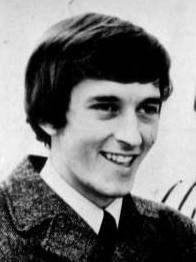
- Hopwood in 1968

Background information
- Born: 26 October 1946 (age 80); Davyhulme, Manchester, England
- Genres: Pop, rock
- Occupations: Musician; singer-songwriter; record producer; composer; businessman
- Instruments: Guitar; vocals; keyboards; bass
- Years active: 1961–present
- Label: RCA

Keith Hopwood (born 26 October 1946) is an English pop musician who was the rhythm guitarist and backing vocalist for the 1960s band Herman's Hermits.

== Life and career ==
Keith Hopwood was born on 26 October 1946 at Park Hospital, Davyhulme area of Trafford. Hopwood attended Urmston Grammar School.

In 1968, Hopwood and Derek Leckenby co-founded Pluto Music, a music production company.

=== Herman's Hermits ===
Hopwood joined Herman's Hermits as the original rhythm guitarist in 1963. The Hermits frontman Peter Noone credits Hopwood with coming up with the idea of recording "Mrs. Brown, You've Got a Lovely Daughter" as an afterthought, when Herman's Hermits were short of material for their first album.

In 1992, Hopwood and fellow member Karl Green, who had departed the group in 1980, joined members Barry Whitwam and Leckenby for a one-off performance at the Rockerama concert in Quaffers, Bredbury. Hopwood briefly rejoined the group following Leckenby's death in 1994.

=== Solo releases ===
In 2021 he wrote his first solo album Never Too Late. Containing eleven original songs, it was released 1 February 2022 and has been followed by two more releases in the "Freedom Calls" project – Chapter I and Chapter II, with Chapter III following in 2025. In 2024, Hopwood released his memoir A Hermit's Tale.

During his career, he and Malcolm Rowe composed the music for the Cosgrove Hall film The Wind in the Willows, as well as the 1984-1990 TV series, and the 1989 television film A Tale of Two Toads.

== Personal life ==
On 20 January 1968, Hopwood married Penny Pagni in Oldmeldrum, Scotland. By 1995, Hopwood had remarried.
