= Linda (given name) =

- An ancient word 'lind', a shield made from the linden tree
- Gender: Female

Origin
- Language: German

Other names
- Related names: Lynda, Lyndal, Linde, Dietlinde, Sieglinde

Linda is a feminine given name. It has been widespread in the English-speaking world since the end of the nineteenth century.

== Etymology ==
The German name Linde was originally an abbreviated form of older names such as Dietlinde and Sieglinde. In the form Linda, it was used by the writer Jean Paul for a leading character in his four-volume novel Titan, published 1800–1803, and it became popular in German-speaking countries thereafter.

The name-element Linde is possibly derived from the same root as the linden tree, with reference to a shield made of that wood, but may have become associated with Germanic lind meaning "soft, tender", the image of the tree being used to indicate a gentle personality. Subsequent support for its appeal may have come from its unrelated usage in the Neo-Latin languages (Italian, Spanish or Portuguese) where the word linda, which is the feminine form of lindo, means "beautiful, pretty, cute" (Spanish and Portuguese) and "clean, neat, tidy" (Italian). It is also a common name in South Africa, Linda, meaning "Wait" (IsiZulu and IsiXhosa).

Among other names in use in English-speaking countries that include the -linda suffix are Melinda, Belinda, Celinda, and Rosalinda.

The name days for Linda are on February 13 (Hungary, Poland), April 15 (Finland, Germany), May 17 (United States), June 19 (Switzerland), June 20 (Sweden), June 25 (Estonia), August 21 (Latvia), September 1 (Czech Republic), September 2 (Slovakia), and September 4 (Poland).

In the Albanian version, Linda is a feminine name which means "birth" or "fertility". The masculine form is Lind. In South African terms the name Linda means "wait" and is not gender based; similar names are Lindiwe also meaning "waited for" but often just written as Lindi in short. Lindokuhle (waiting for something beautiful) and its short form Lindo are related South African-American names.

== Usage ==
Linda was at the height of popularity in the Anglosphere in the middle of the 20th century, particularly in the 1950s. Increased use of the name has been attributed to the hit song “Linda” written by Jack Lawrence and recorded by different artists in 1946. The name has since declined in use. In recent years, Linda has been a name that is more common for the daughters of Chinese and South Korean immigrants to the United States. The name is still in use in some European countries (mainly Central European countries and Italy).

== Notable people ==
- Linda (born 1975/1977), Russian singer
- Linda Arvidson (1884–1949), American actress
- Linda Avey (born 1960), American biologist and entrepreneur
- Linda Barker (born 1961), British television presenter and interior designer
- Linda Barnard (born 1968), South African tennis player
- Linda Bean (1941–2024), American businessperson and donor
- Linda Behnken, American commercial fisher
- Linda L. M. Bennett (born 1951), American political scientist
- Linda Blair (born 1959), American actress and animal rights activist
- Linda Bolder (born 1988), Israeli-Dutch judoka
- Linda Bondestam (born 1977), Finnish illustrator and children's writer
- Linda Bove (born 1945), American actress
- Linda M. Boxer, American hematologist and academic administrator
- Linda Brasil (born 1973), Brazilian politician
- Linda Brava (born 1970), Finnish violinist
- Linda B. Buck (born 1947), American biologist
- Linda Bubon (born 1951), American bookstore founder
- Linda Burgess (born 1969), American former basketball player
- Linda Burney (born 1957), Australian politician
- Linda Caicedo (born 2005), Colombian footballer
- Linda Calvey (born 1948), British author and murderer
- Linda Gist Calvin, American businesswoman and 41st President of the Daughters of the American Revolution
- Linda Carter Brinson (born 1948), American journalist and writer
- Linda Lee Cadwell (born 1945), American teacher, widow of martial artist Bruce Lee
- Linda Cardellini (born 1975), American actress
- Linda S. Carter (born 1963), American politician
- Linda Carty (born 1958), Kittitian-American murderer on death row
- Linda Chavez (born 1947), American politician
- Linda Childers (1946–1970), American murder victim
- Linda Christian (1923–2011), Mexican actress
- Linda Chung (born 1984), Hong Kong-Canadian actress
- Linda Clement (born 1980), Scottish field hockey player
- Linda Coffee (born 1942), American lawyer
- Linda Cohn (born 1959), American sportscaster
- Linda Consolante, Canadian soccer player
- Linda Cook (1962–1986), English murder victim
- Linda Cristal (1931–2020), Argentine-American actress
- Linda Dano (born 1943), American actress, businesswoman, writer
- Linda Darnell (1923–1965), American actress
- Linda de Mol (born 1964), Dutch entertainer
- Linda de Vetta (born 1943), British make-up artist
- Linda Douglas (1928–2017), actress and wife of Hank Greenberg
- Linda Douglass, director of communications for the White House Office of Health Reform
- Linda Douglas (gymnast) (born 1965), Australian rhythmic gymnast
- Linda Dunikoski, American lawyer and prosecutor
- Linda Eder (born 1961), American singer and actress
- Linda Evans (disambiguation), several people
- Linda Evangelista (born 1965), Canadian supermodel
- Linda Fagerström (born 1977), Swedish footballer
- Linda Fairstein (born 1947), American author and former prosecutor
- Linda Fiorentino (born 1958), Italian-American actress
- Linda Forsberg (born 1985), Swedish footballer
- Linda Frohm (born 1977), Swedish politician
- Linda Fruhvirtová (born 2005), Czech tennis player
- Linda Garcia (disambiguation), several people
- Linda Gass, American environmental activist and artist
- Linda Gillard, British writer
- Linda Goldstone (1948–1978), American murder victim
- Linda Gottfredson (born 1947), American psychologist and writer
- Linda Granfield (born 1950), American-Canadian writer
- Linda Grant (born 1951), British writer
- Linda Grant DePauw (born 1940), American historian and author
- Linda Gray (disambiguation), several people
- Linda Greenhouse (born 1947), American legal journalist
- Linda Haglund (1956–2015), Swedish sprinter
- Linda M. Haines (born 1944), English-South African statistician
- Linda Halimi (born 1989), Kosovo-Albanian singer
- Linda Ham, American NASA manager involved in the Columbia shuttle disaster
- Linda Hamilton (born 1956), American actress
- Linda Hart, American actress, singer and musician
- Linda Hazzard (1867–1938), American quack, fraud, swindler and serial killer
- Linda Henry (born 1959), British actress
- Linda Hargreaves, British actress
- Linda Harrison (born 1945), American actress
- Linda Hesse (born 1987), German singer
- Linda Hogan (ethicist) (born 1964), Irish ethicist, theologian and academic
- Linda Hogan (writer) (born 1947), Chickasaw writer and environmentalist
- Linda Hogan (TV personality) (born 1959), American television personality, ex-wife of Hulk Hogan
- Linda Howard (born 1950), American writer
- Linda Hoyle (born 1946), English singer, songwriter and art therapist
- Linda Hunt (born 1945), American actress
- Linda Ikeji (born 1980), Nigerian blogger
- Linda Jones (disambiguation), several people
- Linda Kasabian (1949–2023), American woman who was part of the Manson Family
- Linda King (born 1940), American sculptor, playwright and poet
- Linda King (bowls), Hong Kong lawn and indoor bowler
- Linda King (virologist), virologist in the United Kingdom
- Linda Klimovicova (born 2004), Czech tennis player
- Linda Knowles (born 1946), British high jumper
- Linda Kuk, Hong Kong film producer
- Linda Lai Chiu-han, Hong Kong-based academic, artist, curator and art historian
- Linda Lampenius (born 1970), Finnish violinist
- Linda Lanzillotta (born 1948), Italian politician
- Linda Lappe (1980), American basketball coach
- Linda Larkin (born 1970), American actress
- Linda Lavin (1937–2024), American actress
- Linda Lawton, British researcher
- Linda Le (born 1982), American cosplayer
- Linda Lewis (1950–2023), British musician
- Linda Liao (born 1981), Taiwanese singer, actress and VJ
- Linda Lingle (born 1953), governor of Hawaii
- Linda Lovelace (1949–2002), American pornographic actress, later an anti-pornography activist
- Linda Lucero, American artist
- Linda Lusardi (born 1958), British actress, television presenter
- Linda Mackenzie (born 1983), Australian freestyle swimmer
- Linda Martell (born 1941), American music artist
- Linda Mazri (born 2001), Algerian badminton player
- Linda Mbwale (born 1966), Namibian politician
- Linda McCartney (1941–1998), American photographer, first wife of Paul McCartney
- Linda McClain (born 1958), American law professor
- Linda McGill (1945–2025), Australian competition swimmer
- Linda McLean (born 1957), Canadian musician
- Linda McMahon (born 1948), American politician and business executive
- Linda Montano (born 1942), American artist
- Linda Motlhalo (born 1998), South African soccer player
- Linda Mtoba (born 1991), South African actress and influencer
- Linda Nigmatulina (born 1983), Kazakhstani actress and singer
- Linda Nolan (1959–2025), Irish singer
- Linda Norgrove (1984–2010), American aid worker kidnapped by the Taliban
- Linda Nosková (born 2004), Czech tennis player
- Linda Oe (born 1987), Luxembourgish footballer
- Linda Ohama, Canadian artist and filmmaker
- Linda Ojastu (1936–2006), Estonian sprinter, hurdler and coach
- Linda Olofsson (TV journalist) (born 1973), Swedish TV journalist
- Linda Olofsson (swimmer) (born 1972), Swedish Olympic freestyle swimmer
- Linda Olofsson (sport shooter) (born 1982), Swedish sport shooter
- Linda Papadopoulos (born 1971), English-Greek psychologist
- Linda Pearson (born 1964), Scottish sport shooter
- Linda Park (born 1978), Korean-American actress
- Linda Sue Park (born 1960), American author of teen fiction
- Linda Patricia Pérez López (born 1998), Venezuelan Paralympic athlete
- Linda Perhacs (born 1943), American singer-songwriter
- Linda Perry (born 1965), American singer-songwriter
- Linda Pétursdóttir (born 1969), Icelandic businesswoman, Miss World 1988
- Linda Plant (born 1952), English businesswoman
- Linda Porter (actress) (1933–2019), American character actress
- Linda Porter (historian) (born 1947), English historian and biographer
- Linda Purl (born 1955), American actress
- Linda Rama (born 1964), Albanian economist
- Linda Ramkalawan (b. 1963), First Lady of Seychelles
- Linda Reaves (1949–1985), American murder victim
- Linda Reichl (born 1942), American physicist
- Linda Reid (born 1959), Canadian politician and former MLA
- Linda Robson (born 1958), English actress
- Linda Ronstadt (born 1946), American singer
- Linda Rosenkrantz (born 1934), American writer
- Linda Sánchez (born 1969), American lawyer and politician
- Linda Sarsour (born 1980), American political activist
- Linda Schrenko, American politician
- Linda Spoonster Schwartz (born 1944), American nurse
- Linda Scott (born 1945), American singer and actress
- Linda Scruggs (born 1964), American HIV/AIDS activist and advocate
- Linda Sembrant (born 1987), Swedish footballer
- Linda Seppänen, Swedish singer
- Linda Sheskey (born 1962), American middle distance runner
- Linda J. Silberman, American lawyer
- Linda Smith (disambiguation), several people
- Linda Ellerbee (born 1944), a.k.a. Linda Smith, American journalist
- Linda Smith Dyer (1946–2001), American women's rights activist
- Linda Sobeh (born 1968), Palestinian diplomat
- Linda Staudt (born 1958), Canadian long-distance runner
- Linda Sundblad (born 1981), Swedish singer
- Linda Teuteberg (born 1981), German politician
- Linda Thelenius (born 1974), Swedish glamour model and singer
- Linda Thomas-Greenfield (born 1952), American diplomat
- Linda Thompson (disambiguation), several people
- Linda Chatman Thomsen (born 1954), American lawyer and government official
- Linda Thorson (born 1947), Canadian actress
- Linda Tripp (1949–2020), American civil servant
- Linda Vester (born 1965), American television news personality
- Linda Voortman (born 1979), Dutch politician and trade unionist
- Linda Wagenmakers (born 1975), Dutch singer
- Linda Weiszewski (born 1999), Polish bobsledder
- Linda Winikow (1940–2008), American politician
- Linda Yaccarino (born 1962), American media executive
- Linda Yamane (born 1949), Indigenous American linguist, artist, and activist
- Linda Zagzebski (born 1946), American philosopher
- Linda Zervakis (born 1975), German-Greek television presenter
- Linda Zhang, American automotive engineer
- Linda Züblin (born 1986), Swiss heptathlete

== Fictional characters ==
- Linda, a character on the children's television program Sesame Street
- Linda Carter, a character from the BBC soap opera, EastEnders
- Supergirl (Linda Danvers), a DC Comics superhero
- Linda Reagan, a character in the CBS TV crime drama series, Blue Bloods
- Lynda Van Der Klok, a character in Halloween, played by P. J. Soles

== See also ==
- Linda (Estonian mythology)
