= Linda =

Linda may refer to:

== People ==
- Linda (given name), a female given name including a list of people and fictional characters with the name
- Linda (singer) (born 1977), stage name of Svetlana Geiman, a Russian singer
- Miss Linda, long-time manager and wife of Welsh wrestler Adrian Street

=== Surname ===
- Anita Linda (born Alice Lake, 1924–2020), Filipino film actress
- Bogusław Linda (born 1952), Polish actor
- La Prieta Linda (1933–2021), Mexican singer and actress
- Sarah Linda (born 1987), British actress and model
- Solomon Linda (1909–1962), South African Zulu musician, singer and composer who wrote the song "Mbube" which later became "The Lion Sleeps Tonight"

== Places ==
- Linda, Tasmania, Australia, a ghost town
- Linda Valley, Tasmania
- Linda, Georgia, a village in Abkhazia
- Linda, Bashkortostan, Russia, a village
- Linda, California, United States, a census-designated place
- Linda, Missouri, United States, a ghost town
- 7169 Linda, an asteroid
- Linda, a small lunar crater - see Delisle (crater)

== Media, arts and entertainment ==
=== Film and television ===
- Linda (1929 film), an American film
- Linda (1960 film), a British teen drama
- Linda (1973 film), a TV movie directed by Jack Smight
- Linda (1993 film), starring Richard Thomas and Virginia Madsen
- Linda (TV series), a Hungarian action adventure series
- Linda (Fargo), an episode of the American television series Fargo

=== Music ===
- Linda (Linda George album), 1974
- Linda (Linda Clifford album), 1977
- Linda (Miguel Bosé album), 1978
- "Linda" (1946 song), a popular song written by Jack Lawrence
- "Linda" (Pooh song), 1976, later covered by Miguel Bosé
- "Linda (Tokischa and Rosalía song)", 2021
- "Linda", a song by Ann Ronnell, written for the 1945 film The Story of G.I. Joe
- "Linda", a song by Netón Vega and Tito Double P, 2024

=== Literature ===
- Linda (magazine), a Dutch magazine
- Linda (Estonian magazine) (1887–1905), a feminist literary magazine in Estonia
- "Linda", a poem by Patti Smith from her 1972 book Seventh Heaven

=== Other uses in media, arts and entertainment ===
- Linda (sculpture), a monument in Estonia
- Linda Cube, 1995 role-playing video game

== Other uses ==
- Tropical Storm Linda, various hurricanes, cyclones and storms
- Linda (beetle), a genus of beetles in the family Cerambycidae
- Linda (coordination language), a programming language
- La Linda International Bridge, across the Rio Grande between the U.S. and Mexico

== See also ==
- "Linda Linda", a 1987 single by the Japanese rock band The Blue Hearts, central to the below film
- Linda Linda Linda, a 2005 Japanese film
- Lynda, a given name
- Pretty (disambiguation)
