= Women and children first (disambiguation) =

Women and children first is a code of conduct sometimes applied in marine disaster evacuations in the 19th and early 20th centuries.

"Women and children first" may refer to:

- Women and Children First, a 1943 collection of short stories written by Sally Benson (Random House)
- Women and Children First, a 1980 album by hard rock band Van Halen
- Women and Children First, the second part of the double album Peccadillos by folk singer/songwriter Susan Herndon
- Women & Children First, a feminist bookstore in Chicago, Illinois
