= Linda George (Australian singer) =

Australian musical artist

Linda George OAM
- Born: 1951 (age 74–75); England
- Genres: Pop, jazz fusion, soul
- Occupations: Singer, teacher
- Years active: 1969–present
- Labels: EMI, Columbia, Image, Full Moon

Linda George OAM (born 1951) is an Australian pop, jazz fusion and soul singer from the 1970s. In 1973, George performed the role of Acid Queen for the Australian stage performance of The Who's rock opera, Tommy. She won the TV Week King of Pop award for "Best New Female Artist". Her cover version of "Neither One of Us", peaked at No. 12 on the Australian Singles Chart and her 1974 single "Mama's Little Girl" reached the Top Ten. From 1972 to 1998, George also worked as a session singer and later became a music teacher. Her last CD recorded in the late 1990s would be available in 2012.

== Early career ==
Linda George was born in 1951 in England. She emigrated with her family to Australia in 1964, where they settled in Adelaide, South Australia in the satellite town of Elizabeth. By 1968, George had already worked professionally in a duo and moved to Melbourne to find more musical experience.

She joined her first band, Nova Express, a jazz fusion group similar in repertoire to United States acts Chicago and Blood Sweat and Tears. With George as lead singer, the band included Peter Walsh on organ, Craig Forbes on drums, Ian Hellings on trumpet, Dave Clark on saxophone, the legendary jazz bass player Derek Capewell on bass guitar (after they lost their original bass player, Ray Greenhorn to the draft for Vietnam), Ken Schroder on alto and baritone saxophone, Geoff Schroder on tenor saxophone, and Ken White on guitar. A later member was Graham Morgan on drums.

Early in 1969, the band's first and only single, a cover version of "Take Another Little Piece of My Heart" (originally recorded by Erma Franklin, then Janis Joplin), was released on the EMI label imprint Columbia, the B side featured a Ken White original 'Around the block' which reached No. 28 in Melbourne. They won the Victorian state final of the 1970 Hoadley's Battle of the Sounds ahead of Zoot, though they finished behind The Flying Circus, Zoot and Autumn at the national finals in August. George left Nova Express later that year for a solo career, including performing with The Marlboro Big Band, The Barry Veith Big Band, Opus Big Band, and Brian May and the ABC Show Band on a tour of Vietnam, which included Derek Capewell on bass, Garry Hyde on drums and Melbourne musical stalwarts.

In 1971, George teamed again with Ken Schroder in his band called 'Plant'. This band featured Schroder on saxes and Steve Miller on trombone along with David Alardyce on piano and Colin Deluka on bass plus the Tasmanian drummer Eric Johnson. She worked with that band until 1973 when Ken Schroder left to travel abroad, and she joined Image Records as a solo artist.

== Solo career ==
In 1973, Linda George signed with independent label, Image Records, and released her first solo single "Let's Fly Away" in May. In March 1973, she took the role of Acid Queen in the Australian stage production of The Who's rock opera Tommy. Her fellow cast included Daryl Braithwaite, Colleen Hewett, Billy Thorpe, Ross Wilson, Jim Keays, Doug Parkinson, Broderick Smith, Wendy Saddington, Bobby Bright and The Who's own Keith Moon (as Uncle Ernie for the Melbourne show only). It was later televised by the Seven Network and received a TV award for the year's most outstanding creative effort. For the Sydney show, Australian music commentator Ian "Molly" Meldrum replaced Moon. George won the TV Week King of Pop award for "Best New Female Artist" (1973).

The raised exposure helped promote her second single in July, her cover version of the Gladys Knight & the Pips US hit "Neither One of Us", arranged by the Australian music writer and pianist Peter Jones, which peaked at No. 12 on Go-Set's National Top 40 singles chart. George's follow up single, a remake of Ruby and the Romantics 1963 hit "Our Day Will Come" with a co-production between Peter Jones music arranger and Image records, reached the Top 40 in February 1974.

Her debut LP album, Linda, appeared in August on Image Records. Session musicians were used and Canadian record producer Jack Richardson (Alice Cooper, The Guess Who, Poco and Bob Seger) was brought to Australia by label boss, John McDonald, The first single from Linda was her biggest hit and became her signature song, "Mama's Little Girl" (previously by Dusty Springfield), which went to No. 8 on the Australian Kent Music Report Singles Chart. She performed this song on the debut episode of Australian music show Countdown on 8 November 1974. The second single, "Give It Love", did not reach the top 40. Linda peaked at No. 32 on the Australian Kent Music Report Albums Chart and stayed in the top 100 for five months. George won awards for "Best Female Vocalist" and "Best Female Single".

She appeared both in the 1973 and at the 1975 Sunbury Pop Festival in January. Richardson also produced her second album, Step by Step, which was released in December. It featured a tougher rock sound compared to the previous album's soul and pop sound. After the first album Linda she parted ways with her management company. To promote it she formed the Linda George Band which performed throughout 1976 to positive reviews. The album's first single "Shoo Be Doo Be Doo Dah Day" charted reasonably well in former hometown Adelaide, but public reaction in the rest of Australia was lukewarm. The album peaked in the Top 40. A third single, the title track, was released in May 1976 but failed to make the charts. George then released a non-album single "Sitting in Limbo" in November 1978, a cover of the Jimmy Cliff song, it also did not chart.

George left Image to continue working as a session singer and raise her children. Throughout this time George continued to be in demand for live television performances throughout Australia, and occasional solo performance shows. Peter Faiman produced an iconic segment with George in the "Paul Hogan" show and she featured regularly on the 'Naked Vicar show', and Don Lane and Bert Newton shows.

== Session singer and beyond ==
Linda George had already provided backing vocals on releases by her contemporaries, including Brian Cadd, Madder Lake, Daryl Braithwaite, Normie Rowe, Jo Jo Zep, John Farnham, Kerrie Biddell, and many others. Throughout this time George worked with various ensembles. From early 1979 to 1981 she worked with the Paul McKay Sound.

During 1979, George performed backing vocals on Mike Brady's album Invisible Man. Brady had just had a No. 1 hit with "Up There Cazaly" and set up his own label, Full Moon Records. George signed to his label and returned to the studio with new material. Her first single in four years was a duet with Melbourne singer Paul McKay, "Love Is Enough", released in April 1980, which reached No. 23 locally. Her next single was the up-tempo, "Telephone Lines", in 1981, but it was not a chart success. While resuming her session work, George also spent much of the 1980s singing with her own ensemble, the Linda George Band. The line-up often included David Allardice on piano, which was an early alliance revisited. Later in 1982, she joined with Jeremy Alsop, David Jones and Mark Chew in the band Voice, and worked locally. During that time she represented Australia at the Yamaha music festival in Tokyo.

By 1986, George was a featured member of WJAZ, the Melbourne-based band which featured three singers: herself, Penny Dyer and Lindsay Field, with Alex Pertout on percussion, Colin Hopkins on keyboards, Peter Blick on drums, Ron Pierce on guitar and Steve Hadley on bass. They performed regularly at the Limerick Arms to an enthusiastic fan base. WJAZ continued through to 1993 in various line ups. A later line-up of WJAZ was George, Dyer and Pertout, with Craig Newman and Colin Hopkins.

During the early 1990s, George toured to Russia with two of her seven brothers, in an ensemble that included Colin Hopkins from Melbourne and George Grifsas from Adelaide, working for the Freedom from Hunger campaign. Back in Melbourne, she created a venue, "Music on Q", for local original artists. She recorded an album, Circle Dance, with Hopkins and Pertout, which was released in 1996 as a limited edition CD. Whilst raising three daughters she continued to teach at various schools and colleges throughout Melbourne and also ran a private practice. Her focus was and is on encouraging the individuals voice to emerge, to promote healthy voice habits, and to cultivate the love of originality, improvising and composition in her students.

George became a full-time teacher, after gaining a B.A. and a Dip. Ed., and taught voice for the Victorian College of the Arts and other schools and institutions as a sessional teacher. In 2001, she published, with Steve Vertigan, The Greatest Ever Improve Your Singing Book for Contemporary Vocalists, which included two CDs with practice tracks. and is a basic book for singers of all levels.

George continued to sing occasionally with her own trio but went on to teach in schools full-time both private and public, and recently retired from full-time teaching in schools. She retired as the head of music at Pascoe Vale Girls College in 2012, and now teaches voice and music in state schools and private schools in Melbourne.

== Bibliography ==
- George, Linda; Vertigan, Steve (2001). The Greatest Ever Improve Your Singing Book for Contemporary Vocalists. Fitzroy, Vic: Encore Music Distributors (Australia). Note: Includes a score and two sound discs, which contain practice tracks.

== Discography ==
=== Albums ===
Year	Album details	AUS chart peak
1974	Linda: Released: August 1974; Label: Image Records (ILP-741); Format: LP	32
1975	Step by Step: Released: October 1975; Label: Image Records (ILP-750); Format: LP	93
1996	Circle Dance: Released: 1996; Label: Format: CD	—
"—" denotes releases that did not chart.

=== Singles ===
Year	Title	Peak chart positions		Album
Year	Title	AUS Go-Set	AUS KMR	Album
1972	"Let's Fly Away"	—	—	'Non-album single'
1973	"Neither One of Us (Wants to Be the First to Say Goodbye)"	12	13	'Non-album single'
1973	"Our Day Will Come"	38	45	'Non-album single'
1974	"Mama's Little Girl"	8	8	Linda
1974	"Give It Love"	—	91	Linda
1975	"Shoo Be Doo Be Doo Da Day"	—	85	Step by Step
1976	"Step by Step"	—	—	Step by Step
1976	"Sitting in Limbo"	—	—	' Non-album single'
1980	"Love Is Enough" (duet with Paul McKay)	—	42	' Non-album single'
1981	"Telephone Lines"	—	—	' Non-album single'
1982	"Face to Face"	—	—	' Non-album single'
"—" denotes a recording that did not chart or was not released in that territory.

== Awards and nominations ==
=== King of Pop Awards ===
The King of Pop Awards were voted by the readers of TV Week. The King of Pop award started in 1967 and ran through to 1978.

Year	Nominee / work	Award	Result
1973	herself	Best New Talent	Won
1973	herself	Best Female Vocalist	Won
1973	Mama's Little Girl	Best Female single	Won

FILM

Year	Title	Performance	Type
1980	Beyond Reasonable Doubt released 1983	Unspecified role	Feature film, NZ

TELEVISION

Year	Title	Performance	Type
1969	Hit Scene	Herself - Nova Express sings "Around The Block"	ABC TV series, 1 episode
1969	GTK	Herself - Nova Express sings "Around The Block"	ABC TV series, 1 episode
1969	Hit Scene	Herself - Nova Express sings "Take Another Little Piece Of My Heart"	ABC TV series, 1 episode
1971	Happening '71	Herself - Singer	TV series, 1 episode
1972	Musical Cashbox	Herself - Guest Panel	TV series, 1 episode
1972	Uptight	Herself - Singer	TV series, 1 episode
1973	The Graham Kennedy Show	Herself - Singer sings "Neither One Of Us (Wants To Be The First To Say Goodbye)"	TV series, 9 episodes
1973	The Graham Kennedy Show	Herself - Singer sings "Me and Bobby McGee"	TV series, 1 episode
1973	The Graham Kennedy Show	Herself - Singer sings "Smackwater Jack"	TV series, 1 episode
1973	Ted Hamilton's New Wave	Herself - Guest Singer	TV series, 1 episode
1973	The Graham Kennedy Show	Herself - Singer sings "No One's Gonna Be A Fool Forever"	TV series, 1 episode
1973	The Graham Kennedy Show	Herself - Singer sings "Corner Of The Sky"	TV series, 1 episode
1973	The Graham Kennedy Show	Herself - Singer sings "Neither One Of Us (Wants To Be The First To Say Goodbye)"	TV series, 1 episode
1973	The Graham Kennedy Show	Herself - Singer sings "Standing On The Inside" / "Eleanor Rigby"	TV series, 1 episode
1973;1975	The Paul Hogan Show	Herself sings "Neither One Of Us (Wants To Be The First To Say Goodbye)"	TV series, 1 episode
1973	TV Week King Of Pop	Herself - Winner 'Best New Talent' / 'Best Female Singer' / 'Best Female Single'	TV special
1973	The Graham Kennedy Show	Herself - Singer sings "No One's Gonna Be A Fool Forever"	TV series, 1 episode
1974–1975	The Ernie Sigley Show	Herself - Singer sings "Piano Man"	TV series, 1 episode
1974	The Ernie Sigley Show	Herself sings "Corner Of The Sky"	TV series, 1 episode
1974	Ted Hamilton's Musical World	Herself - Singer	TV series, 1 episode
1974	The Ernie Sigley Show	Herself - Singer sings "You And Me Against The World"	TV series, 1 episode
1974;1975	Countdown	Herself - Guest / Singer sings "Mama's Little Girl"	ABC TV series, 1 episode
1974;1976	Penthouse Club	Herself - Singer	TV series, 2 episodes
1975	The Ernie Sigley Show	Herself - Singer sings "I've Got The Music In Me"	TV series, 1 episode
1975;1981	Countdown	Herself - Singer sings "Give It Love"	ABC TV series, 1 episode
1975	The Graham Kennedy Show	Herself sings "Grits Ain't Groceries (All Around The World)"	TV series, 1 episode
1975	Ian Nash and Friends In Concert	Herself - Singer	TV series, 1 episode
1975	O'Keefe at the Cathedral	Herself - Guest	TV special
1975	The Paul Hogan Show	Herself - Singer sings "Mama's Little Girl"	TV series, 1 episode
1975;1983	The Don Lane Show	Herself - Singer	TV series, 2 episodes
1975	Celebrity Squares	Herself	TV series, 1 episode
1975	The National Record Industry Awards	Herself - Presenter	ABC TV special
1975	Something Special	Herself	ABC TV series, 1 episode
1976	Homicide	Guest role: Laura Guthrie	TV series, 1 episode
1977	Six Tonight	Guest - Herself	TV special
1978	The Naked Vicar Show	Herself as Musical Guest	TV series, 1 episode
1980,1988	Hey Hey It's Saturday	Herself sings "Love Is Enough"/"You Are Mine Tonight" w Paul McKay	TV series, 1 episode
1980	The Don Lane Show	Herself sings "Love Is Enough" with Paul McKay	TV series, 1 episode
1980; 1981	The Mike Walsh Show	Guest - Herself sings "Love Is Enough" with Paul McKay	TV series, 1 episode
1981	Countdown	Herself - Singer sings "Telephone Lines"	ABC TV series, 1 episode
1981; 1983	The Mike Walsh Show	Guest - Herself sings "Telephone Lines"	TV series, 1 episode
1982	McPhail And Gadsby Special	Guest - Linda sings "Wait A Little While"	TV pilot
1982	The Daryl Somers Show	Herself - Singer	TV series, 1 episode
1983	The Don Lane Show	Herself - Singer "You've Got A Friend" w Brian Cadd	TV series, 1 episode
1983, 1984	The Mike Walsh Show	Guest Performer	TV series, 1 episode
1984; 1985	The Mike Walsh Show	Guest Performer	TV series, 1 episode
1985	The Mike Walsh Show	Guest Performer	TV series, 1 episode
1988,1988	Hey Hey It's Saturday	Herself - singer "If You Love Somebody, Set Them Free" w The Debonaires	TV series, 1 episode
1988	Hey Hey It's Saturday	Herself - singer "Higher Love" w The Debonaires	TV series, 1 episode
1988	Hey Hey It's Saturday	Herself - singer "Searchin' w The Debonaires	TV series, 1 episode
2003	Love Is In The Air	Herself - Archive clip	ABC TV series, 1 episode 2: "She's Leaving Home"
