= Alinda (disambiguation) =

Alinda was an ancient inland city of Caria in Anatolia.

Alinda may also refer to:

- 887 Alinda, an asteroid
- Alinda (gastropod), a genus of land snails
- Alinda family, a group of asteroids

== See also ==
- Linda (disambiguation)
