= Ann Christophersen =

American bookstore founder

- Known for: Co-founder of Women & Children First bookstore

Ann Christophersen is one of the founders of Chicago's Women & Children First bookstore. As of 2011, it was the largest feminist bookstore in the United States. Together with Linda Bubon, they opened the store in 1979.

She served on the board of directors of the American Booksellers Association for six years and served as President. In 2002, she was elected president. She backed the ABA's attempts to assist small booksellers, including those publishers who had broken antitrust rules, during her time there.

In 2014, the store was sold to two staff members.

== Awards and honors ==
Christophersen was inducted into the Chicago LGBT Hall of Fame in 1992. In April 2004, Chicago Sun-Times named her one of the 100 most powerful women in Chicago.
