= Lindo =

Lindo is a surname. Notable people with the surname include:

- Abigail Lindo (1803–1848), British lexicographer
- Allan Lindo, more commonly known as apl.de.ap (born 1974), Filipino-American musician
- Dean Lindo (born 1932), Belizean attorney
- Delroy Lindo (born 1952), British-American actor
- Earl Lindo (1953–2017), Jamaican reggae musician
- Elvira Lindo (born 1962), Spanish journalist and writer
- Henry Laurence Lindo, Jamaican civil servant
- Hugo Lindo (1917–1985), Salvadorian writer, diplomat, politician, and lawyer
- Ian Lindo (born 1983), Caymanian footballer
- Jimena Lindo (born 1976), Peruvian actress, dancer and TV presenter
- Juan Lindo (1790–1857), Conservative Central American politician
- José Alexandre Alves Lindo, (born 1973) Brazilian footballer
- Kashief Lindo (born c.1978), Jamaican reggae singer
- Laura Mae Lindo (born 1976), Canadian politician
- Mark Prager Lindo (1819—1877), Dutch prose writer
- Matilde Lindo (1954–2013), Nicaraguan feminist and activist
- Olga Lindo (1899–1968), English actress
- Percy Lindo, Jamaican industrialist and politician
- Ricky Lindo (born 2000), American-Panamanian basketball player in the Israeli Basketball Premier League
- Vincent Lindo (born 1936), English cricketer
- The Lindo family

== Other uses ==
- LINDO, software package for optimization applications
- Lindö, locality in Östergötland County, Sweden
  - Lindö FF, Swedish football club
- Lindø RSC, Danish rugby club

== See also ==
- Lindau (disambiguation)
- Lindokuhle
