= Linda bimaculicollis =

Scientific classification
- Kingdom: Animalia
- Phylum: Arthropoda
- Class: Insecta
- Order: Coleoptera
- Suborder: Polyphaga
- Infraorder: Cucujiformia
- Family: Cerambycidae
- Subfamily: Lamiinae
- Tribe: Saperdini
- Genus: Linda
- Species: L. bimaculicollis

Binomial name
- Linda bimaculicollis Breuning, 1954

Species of beetle

Linda bimaculicollis is a species of flat-faced longhorn in the beetle family Cerambycidae. It is found in China and India.

This species was described by Stephan von Breuning in 1954.
