= Linda apicalis =

Scientific classification
- Kingdom: Animalia
- Phylum: Arthropoda
- Class: Insecta
- Order: Coleoptera
- Suborder: Polyphaga
- Infraorder: Cucujiformia
- Family: Cerambycidae
- Subfamily: Lamiinae
- Tribe: Saperdini
- Genus: Linda
- Species: L. apicalis

Binomial name
- Linda apicalis Pic, 1906

Synonyms
- Linda apicalis Gressitt, 1951; Linda apicalis apicalis Löbl & Smetana, 2010; Linda apicalis subcincta Pic, 1924; Linda apicalis yunnana Breuning, 1976; Linda gibbosicollis Gressitt, 1947; Linda nigriventris Heller, 1923

Species of beetle

Linda apicalis is a species of flat-faced longhorn in the beetle family Cerambycidae. It is found in China, including Tibet.

== Subspecies ==
These two subspecies belong to the species Linda apicalis:

- Linda apicalis yunnana Breuning, 1978
- Linda apicalis yunnanica Breuning, 1979 (China)
