= Linda annamensis =

Scientific classification
- Kingdom: Animalia
- Phylum: Arthropoda
- Class: Insecta
- Order: Coleoptera
- Suborder: Polyphaga
- Infraorder: Cucujiformia
- Family: Cerambycidae
- Subfamily: Lamiinae
- Tribe: Saperdini
- Genus: Linda
- Species: L. annamensis

Binomial name
- Linda annamensis Breuning, 1954

Species of beetle

Linda annamensis is a species of long-horned beetle in the beetle family Cerambycidae. It is found in South, Southeast, and East Asia.

This species was described by Stephan von Breuning in 1954.

== Subspecies ==
These two subspecies belong to the species Linda annamensis:

- Linda annamensis annamensis
- Linda annamensis yunnanensis Breuning, 1960
