= Linda strbai =

Scientific classification
- Kingdom: Animalia
- Phylum: Arthropoda
- Class: Insecta
- Order: Coleoptera
- Suborder: Polyphaga
- Infraorder: Cucujiformia
- Family: Cerambycidae
- Subfamily: Lamiinae
- Tribe: Saperdini
- Genus: Linda
- Species: L. strbai

Binomial name
- Linda strbai Viktora & Lin, 2014

Species of beetle

Linda strbai is a species of beetle in the family Cerambycidae. It was described by Viktora and Lin in 2014. It is known from Malaysia.
