= Linda signaticornis =

Scientific classification
- Domain: Eukaryota
- Kingdom: Animalia
- Phylum: Arthropoda
- Class: Insecta
- Order: Coleoptera
- Suborder: Polyphaga
- Infraorder: Cucujiformia
- Family: Cerambycidae
- Subfamily: Lamiinae
- Tribe: Saperdini
- Genus: Linda
- Species: L. signaticornis

Binomial name
- Linda signaticornis Schwarzer, 1925

Synonyms
- Linda pratti signaticornis Schwarzer, 1925; Linda signaticornis Löbl & Smetana, 2010

Species of beetle

Linda signaticornis is a species of beetle in the family Cerambycidae. It was described by Bernhard Schwarzer in 1925. It is known from Taiwan.
