= Celinda =

Celinda is a female given name related to Linda. It may refer to:

- Celinda Arregui (1864–1941), feminist politician, writer, teacher, suffrage activist
- Celinda Lake, an American pollster and political strategist for the Democratic Party
- Celinda Ortega, Miss New Jersey USA 2021, Miss Dominican Republic USA 2023
- Celinda Pink (born 1957), American country music singer
- Celinda Whitney, one of the namesakes of the Three Sisters Islands (New York)
- Celinda Toobad, a character in the 1818 novel Nightmare Abbey by Thomas Love Peacock

== See also ==
- Celinda (opera), by Errico Petrella (see Raffaele Mirate)
