= Lynda =

Lynda is a spelling variation of the feminine given name Linda. Notable people with the name include:

== People ==
=== Arts and entertainment ===
- Lynda Adams (1920–1997), later Hunt, Canadian diver
- Lynda Baron (1939–2022), British television actress
- Lynda Barry (b. 1956), American cartoonist and author
- Lynda Bellingham (1948–2014), Canadian-born British actress
- Lynda Bryans (b. 1962), Northern Irish television presenter and journalist
- Lynda Carter (b. 1951), American television actress who played Wonder Woman in the 1970s
- Lynda Chouiten (b. 1977), Algerian writer in French
- Lynda Day George (b. 1944), American television actress popular in the 1960s and 1970s
- Lynda Trang Đài (b. 1968), Vietnamese American singer
- Lynda Ghazzali, Malaysian porcelain painter
- Lynda Gibson (1956–2004), Australian comedian and actress
- Lynda Goodfriend (b. 1953), American actress
- Lynda Kay, American contralto singer, songwriter, guitarist, actor and business owner
- Lynda La Plante (b. 1943), British author known for the Prime Suspect television series
- Lynda Laurence (b. 1949), American singer
- Lynda Lemay (b. 1966), Canadian francophone singer-songwriter
- Lynda Lopez (b. 1971), a.k.a. "Ly Lo", American broadcaster and journalist
- Lynda Mendelson (b. 1961), American former child actress
- Lynda Mullaly Hunt, American writer
- Lynda Myles (1939–2023), American writer and actress
- Lynda Myles (b. 1947), British writer and producer
- Lynda Obst (1950–2024), American feature film producer and author
- Lynda Randle (b. 1962), African American singer of southern gospel music
- Lynda Squires (b. 1951), Canadian pop singer
- Lynda Stipe (b. 1962), American singer and bass guitarist
- Lynda Thalie (b. 1978), Canadian singer-songwriter of Algerian origin
- Lynda Thomas (b. 1981), Mexican Eurodance and rock musician popular in the 1990s
- Lynda Topp (b. 1958), one half of the Topp Twins, a New Zealand music comedy duo
- Lynda Weinman (b. 1955), American entrepreneur, author, and co-founder of the lynda.com online training library
- Lynda Williams (b. 1958), Canadian science fiction author and blogger
- Lynda Wiesmeier (1963–2012), American model and actress

=== Politics ===
- Lynda Blanchard (b. 1959), American diplomat and businesswoman
- Lynda Boudreau (b. 1952), American politician who served in the Minnesota House of Representatives
- Lynda Chalker (b. 1942), British Conservative politician
- Lynda Chuba-Ikpeazu (b. 1966), Nigerian politician and model
- Lynda Lovejoy (b. 1949), American politician
- Lynda Pope (b. 1953), née Maddern, Australian chess player
- Lynda Bird Johnson Robb (b. 1944), elder daughter of U.S. President Lyndon B. Johnson and Lady Bird Johnson

=== Sports ===
- Lynda Adams (1920–1997), Canadian diver
- Lynda Blutreich (b. 1971), American javelin thrower
- Lynda Folauhola (b. 1980), also known as Lynda Dackiw, Australian diver
- Lynda Hamri (b. 1989), Paralympian athlete from Algeria competing mainly in sprint and long jump events
- Lynda Holt (b. 1972), Australian paralympic athlete
- Lynda Kiejko (b. 1980), Canadian pistol sport shooter
- Lynda Morales (b. 1988), Puerto Rican indoor volleyball player
- Lynda Prichard (b. 1950), New Zealand cricketer
- Lynda Sutfin (b. 1962), American javelin thrower
- Lynda Tolbert-Goode (b. 1967), American hurdler

=== Others ===
- Lynda Lyon Block (1948–2002), American convicted murderer
- Lynda Chin (b. 1968), Chinese-American medical doctor
- Lynda Gratton (b. 1955), British organizational theorist, consultant and professor
- Lynda Weinman (b. 1955), American business owner, computer instructor, and author

== See also ==
- "Lady Lynda", a 1979 song by The Beach Boys
- “Lynda”, a 1987 song by Steve Wariner
- lynda.com, the former name of the online education site LinkedIn Learning
- Lynda Van der Klok, a fictional character of the Halloween film series played by P. J. Soles
