= Linda gracilicornis =

Scientific classification
- Kingdom: Animalia
- Phylum: Arthropoda
- Class: Insecta
- Order: Coleoptera
- Suborder: Polyphaga
- Infraorder: Cucujiformia
- Family: Cerambycidae
- Subfamily: Lamiinae
- Tribe: Saperdini
- Genus: Linda
- Species: L. gracilicornis

Binomial name
- Linda gracilicornis Pic, 1907

Synonyms
- Linda gracilicornis Breuning, 1954; Linda gracilicornis rufofemorata Breuning, 1954

Species of beetle

Linda gracilicornis is a species of beetle in the family Cerambycidae. It was described by Maurice Pic in 1907.

== Varietas ==
- Linda gracilicornis var. rufofemorata Breuning, 1954
- Linda gracilicornis var. tatsienlui Breuning, 1954
