= Linda nigroscutata =

Scientific classification
- Kingdom: Animalia
- Phylum: Arthropoda
- Class: Insecta
- Order: Coleoptera
- Suborder: Polyphaga
- Infraorder: Cucujiformia
- Family: Cerambycidae
- Subfamily: Lamiinae
- Tribe: Saperdini
- Genus: Linda
- Species: L. nigroscutata

Binomial name
- Linda nigroscutata (Fairmaire, 1902)

Synonyms
- Miocris nigroscutatus Pic, 1907; Linda nigroscutata conjuncta Breuning, 1954; Linda nigroscutata longeplagiata Breuning, 1954; Linda nigroscutata nigroscutata Löbl & Smetana, 2010

Species of beetle

Linda nigroscutata is a species of beetle in the family Cerambycidae. It was described by Léon Fairmaire in 1902, originally under the genus Miocris. It is known from India and China. It feeds on Malus sylvestris.
