= Linda subannulicornis =

Scientific classification
- Kingdom: Animalia
- Phylum: Arthropoda
- Class: Insecta
- Order: Coleoptera
- Suborder: Polyphaga
- Infraorder: Cucujiformia
- Family: Cerambycidae
- Subfamily: Lamiinae
- Tribe: Saperdini
- Genus: Linda
- Species: L. subannulicornis

Binomial name
- Linda subannulicornis Breuning, 1956

Synonyms
- Linda subannulicornis Löbl & Smetana, 2010

Species of beetle

Linda subannulicornis is a species of beetle in the family Cerambycidae. It was described by Stephan von Breuning in 1956. It is known from China.
