= Linda javanica =

Scientific classification
- Kingdom: Animalia
- Phylum: Arthropoda
- Clade: Pancrustacea
- Class: Insecta
- Order: Coleoptera
- Suborder: Polyphaga
- Infraorder: Cucujiformia
- Family: Cerambycidae
- Subfamily: Lamiinae
- Tribe: Saperdini
- Genus: Linda
- Species: L. javanica

Binomial name
- Linda javanica (Vuillet, 1912)

Synonyms
- Dasylinda javanica Vuillet, 1912

Species of beetle

Linda javanica is a species of beetle in the family Cerambycidae. It was described by Vuillet in 1912. It is known from Sumatra and Java.

== Varietas ==
- Linda javanica var. apicaloides Breuning, 1954
- Linda javanica var. basalis (Aurivillius, 1924)
