= Linda major =

Scientific classification
- Kingdom: Animalia
- Phylum: Arthropoda
- Class: Insecta
- Order: Coleoptera
- Suborder: Polyphaga
- Infraorder: Cucujiformia
- Family: Cerambycidae
- Subfamily: Lamiinae
- Tribe: Saperdini
- Genus: Linda
- Species: L. major

Binomial name
- Linda major Gressitt, 1942

Synonyms
- Linda major Löbl & Smetana, 2010

Species of beetle

Linda major is a species of beetle in the family Cerambycidae. It was described by Gressitt in 1942.
