= Linda rubescens =

Scientific classification
- Kingdom: Animalia
- Phylum: Arthropoda
- Clade: Pancrustacea
- Class: Insecta
- Order: Coleoptera
- Suborder: Polyphaga
- Infraorder: Cucujiformia
- Family: Cerambycidae
- Subfamily: Lamiinae
- Tribe: Saperdini
- Genus: Linda
- Species: L. rubescens

Binomial name
- Linda rubescens (Hope, 1831)

Synonyms
- Miocris nigroscutatus var. bisbimaculatus Pic, 1930; Linda fulva Fairmaire, 1895; Saperda rubescens Hope, 1831

Species of beetle

Linda rubescens is a species of beetle in the family Cerambycidae. It was described by Frederick William Hope in 1831. It is known from Nepal, Bhutan and India.

== Subspecies ==
As of 2017, only one subspecies is recognized aside from the nominotypical subspecies:

- Linda rubescens frontalis Pu, 1988 (found in Tibet Autonomous Region)
