= Linda atricornis =

Scientific classification
- Kingdom: Animalia
- Phylum: Arthropoda
- Class: Insecta
- Order: Coleoptera
- Suborder: Polyphaga
- Infraorder: Cucujiformia
- Family: Cerambycidae
- Subfamily: Lamiinae
- Tribe: Saperdini
- Genus: Linda
- Species: L. atricornis

Binomial name
- Linda atricornis Pic, 1924

Synonyms
- Linda atricornis Lin & Yang, 2012

Species of beetle

Linda atricornis is a species of flat-faced longhorn in the beetle family Cerambycidae. It is found in China and Mongolia.

This species was described by Maurice Pic in 1924.
