= Linda semivittata =

Scientific classification
- Kingdom: Animalia
- Phylum: Arthropoda
- Class: Insecta
- Order: Coleoptera
- Suborder: Polyphaga
- Infraorder: Cucujiformia
- Family: Cerambycidae
- Subfamily: Lamiinae
- Tribe: Saperdini
- Genus: Linda
- Species: L. semivittata

Binomial name
- Linda semivittata (Fairmaire, 1887)

Synonyms
- Linda semivittata Löbl & Smetana, 2010; Linda tricostata Gressitt, 1947; Oberea semivittata Fairmaire, 1887; Oberea semivittata subtestaceicolor Pic, 1916

Species of beetle

Linda semivittata is a species of beetle in the family Cerambycidae. It was described by Léon Fairmaire in 1887. It is known from China.
