= Linda zayuensis =

Scientific classification
- Domain: Eukaryota
- Kingdom: Animalia
- Phylum: Arthropoda
- Class: Insecta
- Order: Coleoptera
- Suborder: Polyphaga
- Infraorder: Cucujiformia
- Family: Cerambycidae
- Subfamily: Lamiinae
- Tribe: Saperdini
- Genus: Linda
- Species: L. zayuensis

Binomial name
- Linda zayuensis Pu, 1981

Synonyms
- Linda zayuensis Löbl & Smetana, 2010

Species of beetle

Linda zayuensis is a species of beetle in the family Cerambycidae. It was described by Pu in 1981. It is known from China.
