= Linda scopigera =

Scientific classification
- Domain: Eukaryota
- Kingdom: Animalia
- Phylum: Arthropoda
- Class: Insecta
- Order: Coleoptera
- Suborder: Polyphaga
- Infraorder: Cucujiformia
- Family: Cerambycidae
- Subfamily: Lamiinae
- Tribe: Saperdini
- Genus: Linda
- Species: L. scopigera

Binomial name
- Linda scopigera (Thomson, 1868)

Synonyms
- Linda testacea (Saunders, 1839)

Species of beetle

Linda scopigera is a species of flat-faced longhorn in the beetle family Cerambycidae.
