= Linda femorata =

Scientific classification
- Domain: Eukaryota
- Kingdom: Animalia
- Phylum: Arthropoda
- Class: Insecta
- Order: Coleoptera
- Suborder: Polyphaga
- Infraorder: Cucujiformia
- Family: Cerambycidae
- Subfamily: Lamiinae
- Tribe: Saperdini
- Genus: Linda
- Species: L. femorata

Binomial name
- Linda femorata (Chevrolat, 1852)

Synonyms
- Amphionycha femorata Chevrolat, 1852; Linda femorata Breuning, 1954; Linda femorata rufifrons Breuning, 1954; Linda melanoptera Fairmaire, 1895

Species of beetle

Linda femorata is a species of flat-faced longhorn in the beetle family Cerambycidae. It is found in temperate Asia, including China, Taiwan, and Vietnam .

This species was described by Louis Alexandre Auguste Chevrolat in 1852, originally under the genus Amphionycha.
