= Linda fasciculata =

Scientific classification
- Kingdom: Animalia
- Phylum: Arthropoda
- Class: Insecta
- Order: Coleoptera
- Suborder: Polyphaga
- Infraorder: Cucujiformia
- Family: Cerambycidae
- Subfamily: Lamiinae
- Tribe: Saperdini
- Genus: Linda
- Species: L. fasciculata

Binomial name
- Linda fasciculata Pic, 1902

Synonyms
- Dasylinda vitalisi Vuillet, 1912; Linda vitalisi Breuning, 1954; Linda vitalisi fasciculata Breuning, 1954; Linda vitalisi nigroreducta Breuning, 1954

Species of beetle

Linda fasciculata is a species of flat-faced longhorn in the beetle family Cerambycidae. It is found in China and Vietnam.

It was described by Maurice Pic in 1902.
