= Linda pyritosa =

Scientific classification
- Domain: Eukaryota
- Kingdom: Animalia
- Phylum: Arthropoda
- Class: Insecta
- Order: Coleoptera
- Suborder: Polyphaga
- Infraorder: Cucujiformia
- Family: Cerambycidae
- Subfamily: Lamiinae
- Tribe: Saperdini
- Genus: Linda
- Species: L. pyritosa

Binomial name
- Linda pyritosa Holzschuh, 2013

Species of beetle

Linda pyritosa is a species of beetle in the family Cerambycidae. It was described by Holzschuh in 2013.
