= Palestine–Venezuela relations =

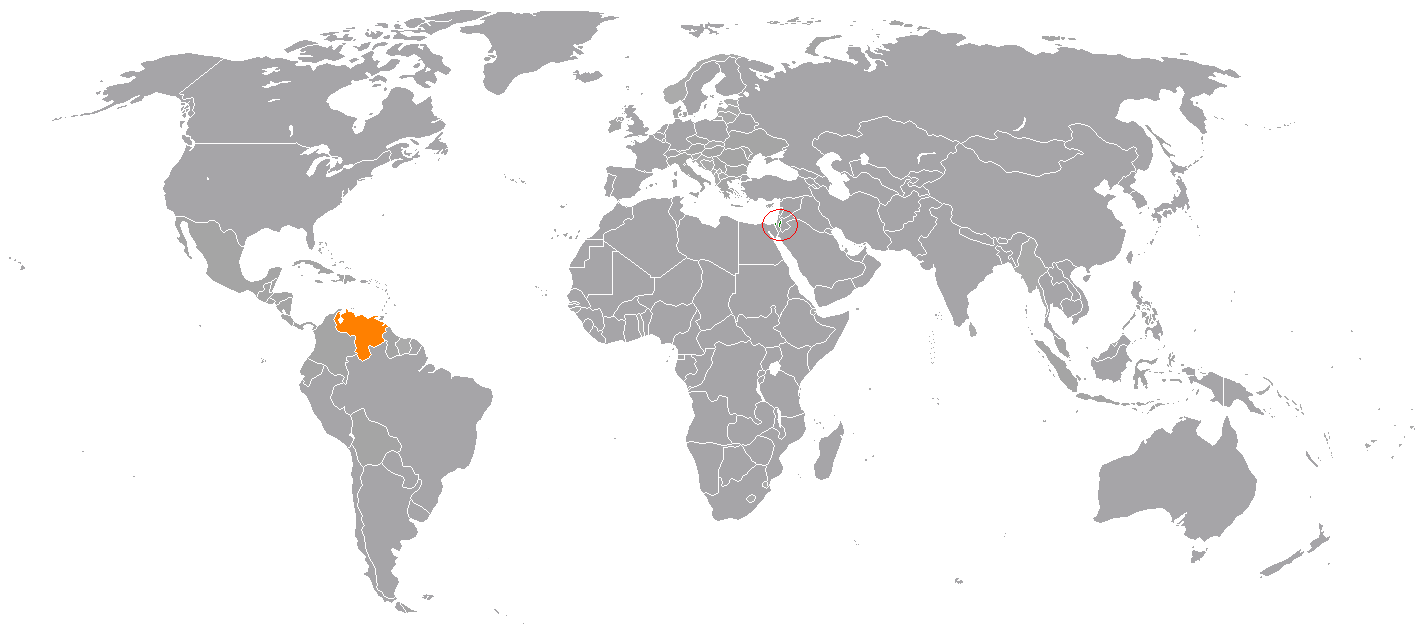

- Palestine: Venezuela

Under the rule of President Hugo Chávez who was elected President of Venezuela in 1998, relations between Israel and Venezuela rapidly deteriorated as Chavez strongly supported the rights of the Palestinians and condemned Israeli war actions. He twice expelled the Israeli ambassador to Venezuela (in 2006, during the 2006 Lebanon War, and in 2009, in response to the 2008–2009 Gaza War). Venezuela officially recognized Palestine and established diplomatic relations with the Palestinian Authority on 27 April 2009.

== History ==
During the 2006 Israel-Lebanon conflict between Israel and Hezbollah, Chávez expelled the Israeli ambassador to Venezuela and downgraded economic and military accords between Venezuela and Israel. Chávez compared Israel's actions to Adolf Hitler and the Nazis. During a visit to both Russia and China in 2006, Chavez called for Israeli leaders to be tried in the International Criminal Court. According to Nikhil Shah of Z Magazine, Chavez's speeches and verbal attacks against Israel earned him praise throughout the Arab world. Since then, Venezuela has strengthened its ties with Russia, China, Cuba and Iran in order to counter the support that Israel receives from the United States.

With the 2008–2009 Gaza War, Venezuela cut off all diplomatic ties with Israel and expelled the Israeli ambassador from Caracas. After breaking diplomatic relations with Israel in January 2009 in protest at the invasion, Venezuela's Foreign Ministry said in September 2009 it would depend on Spain to represent its interests in Israel. Israel's interests in Venezuela would be represented by Canada. On 27 April 2009, Venezuela officially recognised Palestine and has since supported the Palestinian cause at the United Nations, being the first country in the Americas to do so. On 29 November 2012, Venezuela voted in favor of granting recognition as an observer status to Palestine at the United Nations. During the 2014 Gaza War, President Nicolás Maduro said that the government "vigorously condemns the unfair and disproportionate military response by the illegal state of Israel against the heroic Palestinian people."

Since the start of the Venezuelan presidential crisis, Palestine has supported Maduro. Bilateral relations were strengthened under ambassador Linda Sobeh.

Since the Gaza war has started, Venezuela has continued to support Palestine.

== See also ==
- Foreign relations of Palestine
- Foreign relations of Venezuela
- Israel–Venezuela relations
- Foreign policy of the Hugo Chávez administration
