= Lyndal =

Lyndal is a feminine given name.

== List of people with the given name ==
- Lyndal Davies (born 1967), Australian journalist and zoologist
- Lyndal Harrington, American blogger
- Lyndal Oatley (born 1980), Australian equestrian
- Lyndal Osborne (born 1940), Canadian artist
- Lyndal Roper (born 1956), Australian historian and academic

== See also ==
- Lyndel
- Lynda
