= Lindokuhle =

Lindokuhle is a South African given name. Notable people with the name include:

- Lindokuhle Mbatha (born 1985), South African football player
- Lindokuhle Mnguni (1994–2022), South African activist
- Lindokuhle Mkhwanazi (born 1985), South African footballer
- Lindokuhle Mtshali (born 1998), South African footballer
- Lindokuhle dlovu (born 1994), Zimbabwean footballer
- Lindokuhle Sibankulu (born 1981), South African basketball player
- Lindokuhle Sobekwa (born 1995), South African documentary photographer

== See also ==
- Linda (name)
- Lindo
