= Step by Step (Linda George album) =

Studio album by Linda George
- Released: December 1975
- Genre: Soul/pop
- Label: Image
- Producer: Jack Richardson for Nimbus Nine Productions

Linda George chronology
Linda (1974)	Step by Step (1975)

Step by Step is the second album by Australian singer Linda George.

== Track listing ==
1. Shoo Be Doo Be Doo Da Day (Stevie Wonder / Henry Cosby/ Sylvia Moy)
2. New York City
3. Drift Away (Mentor Williams)
4. Goin' Thru Some Changes (Mike Settle)
5. California Free (Mike Settle)
6. Step By Step (Bias Boshell)
7. Home Made Love (Don Covay)
8. Old Time Feeling (Tom Jans / Will Jennings)
9. You Put Something Better Inside (Gerry Rafferty / Joe Egan)
10. I Wanna Hear Music
11. Goin' Through The Motions

== Charts ==
Chart (1975)	Peak position
Australia (Kent Music Report)	93

== Album credits ==
Producer: Jack Richardson for Nimbus Nine Productions
