= Linda stolata =

Scientific classification
- Domain: Eukaryota
- Kingdom: Animalia
- Phylum: Arthropoda
- Class: Insecta
- Order: Coleoptera
- Suborder: Polyphaga
- Infraorder: Cucujiformia
- Family: Cerambycidae
- Subfamily: Lamiinae
- Tribe: Saperdini
- Genus: Linda
- Species: L. stolata

Binomial name
- Linda stolata Pesarini & Sabbadini, 1997

Synonyms
- Linda stolata Löbl & Smetana, 2010

Species of beetle

Linda stolata is a species of beetle in the family Cerambycidae. It was described by Pesarini and Sabbadini in 1997. It is known from China.
