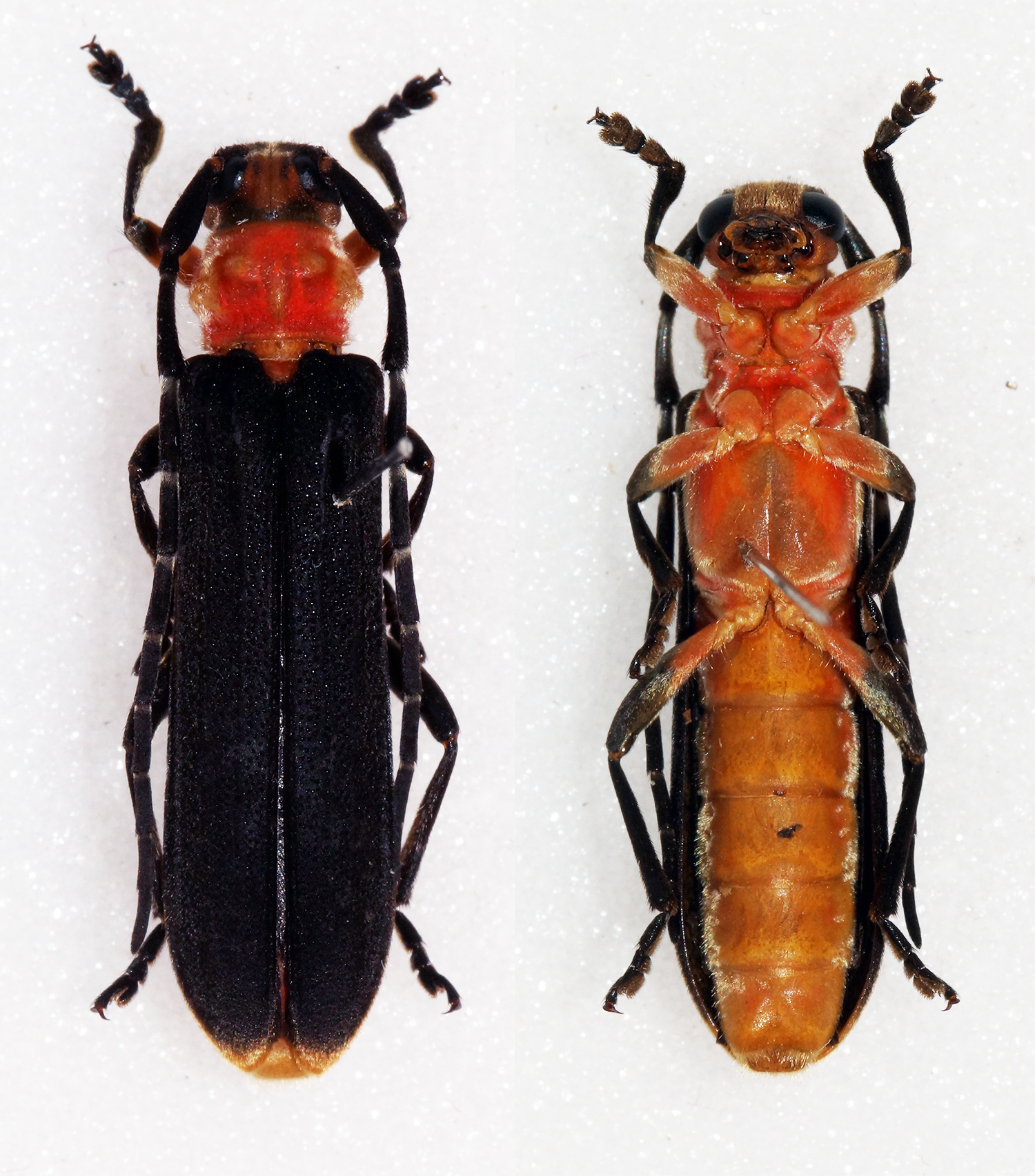
- Linda annulicornis

Scientific classification
- Domain: Eukaryota
- Kingdom: Animalia
- Phylum: Arthropoda
- Class: Insecta
- Order: Coleoptera
- Suborder: Polyphaga
- Infraorder: Cucujiformia
- Family: Cerambycidae
- Subfamily: Lamiinae
- Tribe: Saperdini
- Genus: Linda
- Species: L. annulicornis

Binomial name
- Linda annulicornis Matsushita, 1933

Synonyms
- Linda annulicornis Löbl & Smetana, 2010; Linda annulicornis ruficeps Breuning, 1956; Linda subannulata Breuning, 1966

= Linda annulicornis =

Species of beetle

Linda annulicornis is a species of Long-Horned Beetle in the beetle family Cerambycidae. It is found in temperate Asia.

This species was described by Masaki Matsushita in 1933.
