= Linda fraterna =

Scientific classification
- Domain: Eukaryota
- Kingdom: Animalia
- Phylum: Arthropoda
- Class: Insecta
- Order: Coleoptera
- Suborder: Polyphaga
- Infraorder: Cucujiformia
- Family: Cerambycidae
- Subfamily: Lamiinae
- Tribe: Saperdini
- Genus: Linda
- Species: L. fraterna

Binomial name
- Linda fraterna (Chevrolat, 1852)

Synonyms
- Amphionycha fraterna Chevrolat, 1852; Linda fraterna Löbl & Smetana, 2010; Linda pratti Pic, 1902; Linda seminigra Heller, 1923; Linda seminigra luteonotata Pic, 1907; Linda seminigra subtestacea Pic, 1906; Oberea seminigra Fairmaire, 1887

Species of beetle

Linda fraterna is a species of flat-faced longhorn in the beetle family Cerambycidae. It is found in China and Taiwan.

This species feeds on Chaenomeles japonica and Prunus japonica.

== Varieties ==
- Linda fraterna var. pratti Pic, 1902
- Linda fraterna var. luteonata Pic, 1907
- Linda fraterna var. subtestacea Pic, 1906
- Linda fraterna var. seminigra (Fairmaire, 1887)
