= Lyndel =

Lyndel is a unisex given name. Notable people with the name include:

- Lyndel V. Prott (born 1940), Australian legal academic
- Lyndel Richardson (born 1986), Anguillan cricketer
- Lyndel Rowe, Australian actress
- Lyndel Soon (fl. 2011–present), Malaysian beauty pageant contestant
- Lyndel Wright (born 1950), Jamaican cricketer

== See also ==
- Lyndal
