= Linda, Bashkortostan =

Linda Линда
- Village
- Location within Bashkortostan Location within Russia
- Coordinates: 54°05′N 55°06′E
- Country: Russia
- Region: Bashkortostan
- District: Alsheyevsky District
- Time zone: UTC+5:00

Linda (Russian: Линда) is a rural locality (a village) in Abdrashitovsky Selsoviet, Alsheyevsky District, Bashkortostan, Russia. The population was 116 as of 2010. There are 2 streets.

== Geography ==
Linda is located 14 km east of Rayevsky (the district's administrative centre) by road. Shishma is the nearest rural locality.
