= Linda McLean =

Canadian musician, singer and songwriter (born 1957)

- Born: 1957 (age 68–69); Belleville, Ontario, Canada
- Labels: Bongo Beat; Mandolin; MapleMusic (Canada); Burnside Distribution (US); Rounder (Europe)

Linda McLean (born 1957) is a Canadian musician, singer and songwriter. McLean's debut album was released in Europe on Rounder Records, her second released internationally on Bongo Beat Records and her acoustic CD on her own Mandolin Records.

== (2003) Betty’s Room ==
McLean’s first international performance was at the 2000 ROCKRGRL Music Conference in Seattle. Her first full-length album, Betty’s Room, co-written with partner Andy McLean, and produced by music veteran and friend John Whynot, featured drummer Gary Craig and Blue Rodeo sideman Bob Egan. Its independent release in 2002 established McLean as a noteworthy Canadian songwriter, achieving critical acclaim and airplay across Canada on CBC and Galaxie, a publishing deal with Feldman & Assc, and a Songwriter of the Year award at the first annual Northern Ontario Music and Film Awards for the song "Mandolin". In September 2003, Rounder/Europe picked up the license for "Betty’s Room" and released it across Europe under the "Me and My Records" label banner where it became top pick of the UK Distributors, achieved universal 4-star reviews, tour spots and radio interviews, especially in the Netherlands, where the now famous Dutch music journalist Leo Blokhuis dubbed the CD "a rare pearl" and "masterpiece" describing McLean as "a singer songwriter in the best tradition of fellow Canadian Joni Mitchell’s 70’s work". Critical acclaim did not translate into mass commercial success.

== (2005) No Language ==
In 2004 McLean returned to the studio with partner Andy and producer John Whynot to record 12 new songs in the collection titled No Language. The CD was picked up for licensing and international distribution by the Canadian indie label, Bongo Beat Records, headed by industry veteran Ralph Alfonso. McLean was added to a roster with an eclectic assortment of artists including Johnny Dowd, Paul Hyde, Jeb Loy Nicols among many others; artists hand selected by Alfonso to suit his personal attraction to strong lyrics and innovative musical arrangements. No Language attracted a wider audience in Canada with continued critical acclaim, and in 2005 Linda McLean was chosen by Mark Rheaume of CBC Radio's "Fresh Air" as one of the three top Canadian singer songwriters, along with Kathleen Edwards and Sarah Harmer. No Language was championed by the BBC’s "Whispering" Bob Harris who featured songs on both of his evening BBC Radio 2 programs. Following a succession of affirmative reviews in Norway, Spain, the Netherlands and the UK McLean independently supported the release with tours, interviews and industry showcases. She was interviewed on BBC Liverpool by the noted musicologist Spencer Leigh.

In June 2007, McLean performed live to BBC Radio 2 from Toronto’s CBC station.

McLean’s first two CDs have been met with critical acclaim but have not sold in substantial numbers to attain break through status.

== Mandolin Records ==
Mandolin Records was a pre-production studio in Muskoka.

McLean created Muskoka Song Night, hosting an evening of great Canadian singer songwriters at the Hideaway Pub in downtown Huntsville. Guests included Katherine Wheatley, Robert Priest, Carlos del Junco, Karyn Ellis, James Gordon, Jon Brooks, Marianne Girard, Suzie Vinnick, Craig Cardiff, Jenny Whiteley, Laura Repo, Blair Packham, Tannis Slimmon and Lewis Melville, among others. Linda McLean was the last person to sing in the landmark venue. Two nights after October's Song Night, the Empire Hotel was destroyed by fire and the subsequent water damage of an enthusiastic local fire department. The song she sang, accompanied by her husband Andy and Slimmon and Melville, was "Beauty".

Under Mandolin Records and Huntsville Festival of the Arts, McLean created The Songwriter’s Session, one hour preceding Muskoka Song Night to offer groups of local Muskoka songwriters an opportunity to spend an intensive hour with a seasoned professional. Under Mandolin Records, McLean continues to offer workshops and produce live music events for various organizations.

== Advocacy ==
McLean is married to Andy McLean, Executive Director of ECMA was former managing director of North by Northeast Music and Film Festival and Conference for 18 years and created an ethos of support to music and musicians first, predicting and supporting the rise and influence of independent music in Canada. In the early years of NXNE (1993 to 1996) Linda McLean was directly involved as the office and conference coordinator, helping establish the event as the primary music industry event in Canada. McLean has been a showcasing artist at SXSW 2003 in Austin TX at the Hideout, and at NXNE 2006 in Toronto ON at the Drake.

== Educator ==
McLean is founding partner and facilitator of Women's Music Weekend, with singer-songwriter Katherine Wheatley and singer-songwriter Jane Lewis and hosted the first four weekends at Mandolin Records Studio in Muskoka.

McLean was one of the original Faculty members of the Independent Music Production at Seneca College in Toronto (where she taught from 2004 to 2007). McLean was consulted as an independent artist and educator to create and develop the programs and curriculum for Artist Development, Songwriting, Industry Overview and Music Theory.

== Discography ==
- 2003 : Betty’s Room
- 2005 : No Language

== See also ==
- List of Canadian musicians
