= Hit Scene =

- Genre: music programming
- Directed by: Roger Prior
- Presented by: Dick Williams
- Country of origin: Australia
- Original language: English

Production
- Executive producer: Alan Morris
- Producer: Bernard Terry
- Production location: Elsternwick Victoria
- Running time: 30 minutes
- Production company: Australian Broadcasting Commission

Original release
- Network: ABC TV
- Release: 10 May 1969 – 16 December 1972

Related
- Hit Parade

Hit Scene is an Australian music television series produced and broadcast by ABC TV in black and white transmission. The thirty-minute weekly series debuted on 10 May 1969 and was broadcast until 16 December 1972.

== History ==
Hit Scene was developed by the ABC's Light Entertainment department, under the supervision of the Director of Television Programs, Ken Watts. The series was hosted by Melbourne radio announcer Dick Williams (Richard Arthur Williams (1931–2014). Williams had previously hosted ABC's Hit Parade, which was broadcast only in Victoria as part of their Saturday afternoon Sportsview program, and was chief reviewer on Radio Australia's 'International Record Review' short wave service. Williams had come to the television hosting job having successfully auditioned in early 1964 based on years of radio work. He had worked his way up from selling airtime and writing copy on 3KZ in Melbourne, 7AD and 7LA in Tasmania and 3HA Hamilton and 3TR Sale back in Victoria. He took over the Hit Parade and Radio Australia compering jobs from Pete Smith, who moved on to GTV-9.

== Broadcast ==
The time slot for Hit Scene varied between broadcast regions. It was regularly broadcast at 2.10 p.m. (AEST) on Saturdays in Victoria, during the Sportsview programme, with the time-slot adjusted if it clashed with a scheduled sporting fixture. In NSW it was often seen around midday, screening outside of Sportsview. It also changed screening days at certain times of year, screening, for example, on Sundays at 6pm in Victoria late in 1969. The first episode was seen only in Melbourne due to the ABC's sporting commitments in other Australian states. The final episode was an hour-long special. Each episode would feature interviews with Australian musicians or a touring international artist, an in-house performance by an Australian musical artist, film footage of an overseas musical act, music charts from around Australia, and reviews of new releases. Hit Scene also broadcast special concerts during weekdays, including the farewell Australian concert of Max Merritt and the Meteors (Monday 8.00 pm, 13 July 1970) before their first North American tour.

== Theme ==
Early episodes of Hit Scene featured a musically themed introduction track 'Mr. Eliminator' by Dick Dale and His Del-Tones, backing Brisbane band The Avengers (not be confused with the New Zealand band of the same name and time period) appearing and disappearing at various locations across Melbourne, along with compere Williams driving his Holden Monaro GTS to the ABC studios. The Avengers appeared in-person on the first national episode on 17 May 1969, promoting their latest EMI single "Twiddle-E-Dee", composed by Terry Britten. Unlike GTK, in-house performances were mostly mimed to pre-recorded music. This may have played a part in Hit Scene's demise, because the Musicians' Union and Actors Equity decided on 1 November 1972 to ban all mimed performances on Australian television.

== Production ==
Hit Scene was recorded in monochrome at the ABC's Ripponlea television studios in the Melbourne suburb of Elsternwick. Early episodes were produced by Bernard Terry, and directed by Roger Prior, with Alan Morris as executive producer. Brian Rodgers, Paul Brown, Ron Cromb, and Dick Robins provided technical production. Art work and set design was overseen by Peter Redman. The stylized graphics and logo were designed by Vivienne Adolphus.
