= Linda Jones (disambiguation) =

Linda Jones (1944–1972) was an American soul singer.

Linda Jones may also refer to:

- Linda Bebko-Jones (1946–2011), American politician in Pennsylvania
- Linda Jones (greyhound trainer) (born 1948), UK champion greyhound trainer
- Linda Medlar-Jones (born 1949), participant in 1990s sex scandal and convicted fraudster
- Linda Jones (jockey) (born 1952), New Zealand jockey
- Linda Winstead Jones, pen name Linda Jones, American author active since 1999
