= Linda Smith =

Linda Smith may refer to:

- Linda Smith (comedian) (1958–2006), English radio comedy performer, stand-up comic and writer
- Linda Smith (American politician) (born 1950), American congresswoman, 1995–1999
- Linda Smith (novelist) (1949–2007), Canadian writer of children's fiction
- Linda B. Smith (active since 1993), American psychology professor
- Linda Smith (dancer), American artistic director in Utah Repertory Dance Theatre
- Linda Catlin Smith (born 1957), composer
- Linda Ellerbee (born 1944), a.k.a. Linda Smith, American journalist
- Linda Smith Dyer (1946–2001), American women's rights activist
- Linda Tuhiwai Smith, New Zealand education academic
- Linda Smith (musician), American home recording artist
- Linda Smith (bowls), Hong Kong international lawn bowler
- Linda C. Smith, professor at the University of Illinois School of Information Sciences
- Murder of Linda Smith (died 1961), English murder victim

== See also ==
- Linda Smyth, American politician from Virginia
