= Linda Scruggs =

American HIV/AIDS activist

Linda H. Scruggs (born 1964) is a HIV/AIDS activist and advocate. She is the co-owner and founder of the Ribbon Consulting Group, a founding member of the Positive Women's Network USA and a founding member of the US National Black Woman HIV Network.

== Biography ==
Scruggs tested positive for HIV in 1990 when she was 13 weeks pregnant and 18 months into drug recovery. She was offered a termination of the pregnancy, but refused, and her son was born HIV-negative. After her diagnosis, Scruggs became a HIV/AIDS activist and advocate. She began working as a women's health advocate at the Moore Clinic at the Johns Hopkins University.

In 2012, Scruggs co-founded the non-profit Ribbon Consulting Group, which facilitates engagement with policymakers, government agencies, and national HIV organizations. She is also a founding member of the Positive Women's Network USA and a founding member of the US National Black Woman HIV Network.

Scruggs has spoken about HIV in front of heads of state, such as Bill Clinton. She was also given an Honorable Mention by Barack Obama when he launched his National HIV/AIDS Strategy in 2010.

Scruggs was quoted by the Joint United Nations Programme on HIV/AIDS on the 40th anniversary of Denver Principles. She spoke at the 2012 International AIDS Society's Conference in Washington, D.C.

In January 2024, Scruggs was awarded an honorary Doctorate of Humane Letters (DHL) by the Breakthrough Bible College and Theological Seminary.

== Activism ==
She has dedicated over three decades of her life to fighting for and championing the rights and well-being of people living with HIV/AIDS.
