= Linda Gray (disambiguation) =

Linda Gray (born 1940) is an American actress.

Linda Gray may also refer to:

- Linda Gray (politician), Republican State Senator in Arizona
- Linda Gray Sexton (born 1953), American writer
- Linda Esther Gray (born 1948), Scottish soprano
- Linda Gary (1944–1995), American voice actress, sometimes credited as Linda Gray
