= Linda Oe =

Luxembourgish footballer (born 1987)

Personal information
- Full name: Linda Oe
- Date of birth: 18 February 1987 (age 39)
- Position: Goalkeeper

International career
Years	Team	Apps	(Gls)
2008–2009	Luxembourg	5	(0)

Linda Oe (born 18 February 1987) is a Luxembourgish footballer. A goalkeeper, she played five times for the Luxembourg women's national football team.

== Club career ==
Oe played for Minerva Lintgen and US Berdorf/Consdorf before returning to Lintgen. In 2013 she signed for Pratz/Redange.

== International career ==
Oe first played for Luxembourg in a victory against Latvia in 2008 and went on to earn five caps.
