= Linda Thompson (disambiguation) =

Linda Thompson (born 1950) is an American actress and songwriter.

Linda Thompson may also refer to:

- Linda Thompson (singer) (born 1947), British folk singer
- Linda G. Thompson, (born 1948), member of the German band Silver Convention, and also a solo performer
- Linda Thompson (attorney) (1953–2009), Indiana attorney known for her conspiracy theories surrounding Waco Siege and Bill Clinton
- Linda D. Thompson (born c. 1961), former mayor of Harrisburg, Pennsylvania
- Linda Thompson (artistic director), Australian operatic soprano, producer and stage director

== See also ==
- Linda Chavez-Thompson (born 1944), executive vice-president of the AFL-CIO
- Linda Chatman Thomsen, U.S. Securities and Exchange Commission official
