= Linda Bubon =

American bookstore founder

- Born: June 2, 1951 (age 75)
- Education: University of Illinois at Chicago
- Known for: Co-founder of Women & Children First bookstore
- Awards: Chicago LGBT Hall of Fame

Linda Bubon is one of the founders of Chicago's Women & Children First bookstore. As of 2011, it was the largest feminist bookstore in the United States. Together with Ann Christophersen, they opened the store in 1979.

== Early life and education ==
Bubon was born on June 2, 1951. She considers herself a lifelong feminist who was "raised in a house of equality" and campaigned for Bobby Kennedy while in high school. Bubon holds a graduate degree from the University of Illinois at Chicago. During the late 1980s, Bubon went to rallies in support of the National Endowment for the Arts. While pursuing her degree, she worked for Borders and Barnes & Noble and cited her desire to one day work in an independent bookstore.

== Career ==
Bubon co-founded Women & Children First bookstore with Ann Christophersen in 1979. On deciding to open their own bookstore, she cites taking inspiration from a feminist criticism group and difficulty encountered finding works by female authors at the time. Bubon recalls looking for a book on a "lesbian life story" and could not find anything after visiting 6 different bookstores. She acknowledged the economic pressure encountered from the big chain bookstores and policies of the George W. Bush administration.

In 2014, she and Christophersen sold the store to two staff members; Bubon continued to work part-time in the store. She was appointed to Chicago's first Advisory Council for gay and lesbian issues by mayor Harold Washington. Bubon also served on the board of the Independent Booksellers of the Chicago Area, the Andersonville Chamber of Commerce, and the Chicago Women's Health Center.

== Awards and honors ==
Bubon was inducted into the Chicago LGBT Hall of Fame in 2023.

In April 2004, the Chicago Sun-Times named her one of the 100 most powerful women in Chicago.
