= Linda Evans (disambiguation) =

Linda Evans (born 1942) is an American actress.

Linda Evans may also refer to:

- Linda Evans (activist) (born 1947), American activist
- Linda Evans (author) (1958–2023), American science fiction writer
- Linda Evans (bowls), Welsh international lawn bowler
