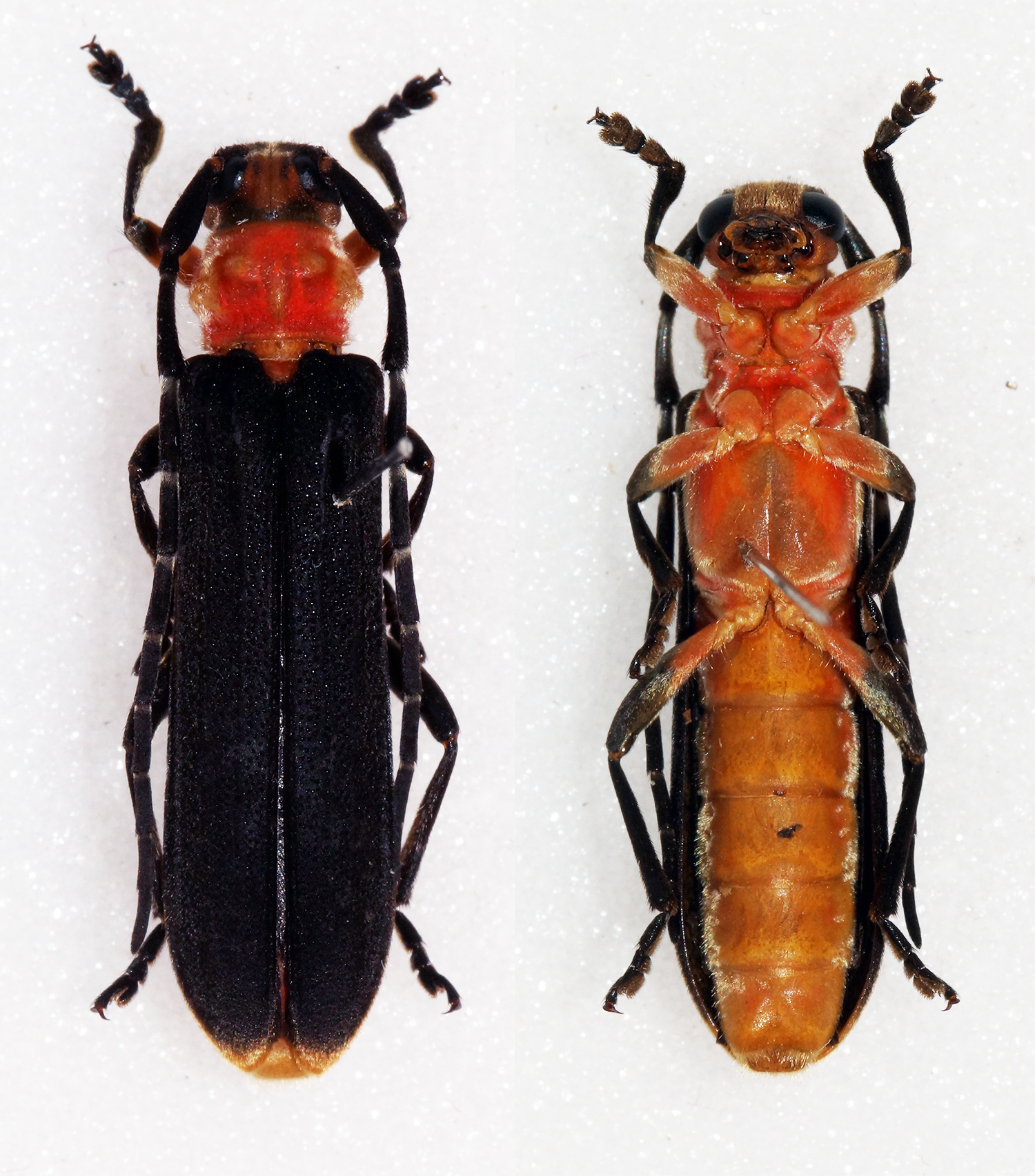
- Linda annulicornis

Scientific classification
- Domain: Eukaryota
- Kingdom: Animalia
- Phylum: Arthropoda
- Class: Insecta
- Order: Coleoptera
- Suborder: Polyphaga
- Infraorder: Cucujiformia
- Family: Cerambycidae
- Subfamily: Lamiinae
- Tribe: Saperdini
- Genus: Linda; Thomson, 1864

Synonyms
- Dasylinda Thomson, 1868; Miocris Fairmaire, 1902

= Linda (beetle) =

Genus of beetles

Linda is a genus of longhorn beetles of the subfamily Lamiinae, containing the following species:

subgenus Dasylinda

- Linda apicalis Pic, 1906 (China, including Tibet)
- Linda fasciculata Pic, 1902 (China and Vietnam)
- Linda javanica (Vuillet, 1912) (Sumatra and Java)
- Linda scopigera (Thomson, 1868)
- Linda strbai Viktora & Lin, 2014 (Malaysia)

subgenus Linda

- Linda annamensis Breuning, 1954 (India and Vietnam)
- Linda annulicornis Matsushita, 1933 (temperate Asia)
- Linda assamensis Breuning, 1954 (India)
- Linda atricornis Pic, 1924 (Mongolia and China)
- Linda bimaculicollis Breuning, 1954 (China and India)
- Linda femorata (Chevrolat, 1852) (temperate Asia)
- Linda fraterna (Chevrolat, 1852) (China and Taiwan)
- Linda frontalis Pu, 1988
- Linda gracilicornis Pic, 1907 (China)
- Linda javaensis Breuning, 1954 (Indonesia)
- Linda macilenta Gressitt, 1947 (China)
- Linda major Gressitt, 1942 (China)
- Linda nigroscutata (Fairmaire, 1902) (China and India)
- Linda procera Holzschuh, 2013 (Laos)
- Linda pyritosa Holzschuh, 2013 (Laos)
- Linda rubescens (Hope, 1831) (Nepal, Bhoutan, China, and India)
- Linda semiatra Holzschuh, 2003 (Nepal)
- Linda semivittata (Fairmaire, 1887) (China)
- Linda signaticornis Schwarzer, 1925 (temperate Asia)
- Linda stolata Pesarini & Sabbadini, 1997 (China)
- Linda subannulicornis Breuning, 1956 (China)
- Linda subatricornis Lin & Yang, 2012 (China)
- Linda tartata Viktora & Lin, 2020
- Linda tonkinensis Breuning, 1959 (Vietnam)
- Linda zayuensis Pu, 1981 (China)
