= Vincent Lindo =

Jamaican cricketer (1936–2023)

Personal information
- Full name: Cleveland Vincent Lindo
- Born: 6 June 1936; Bigwoods, St Elizabeth, Jamaica
- Died: 6 January 2023 (aged 86)
- Batting: Right-handed
- Bowling: Right-arm fast-medium
- Role: Bowler

Domestic team information
- Years: Team
- 1960: Nottinghamshire
- 1963: Somerset
- First-class debut: 30 April 1960 Nottinghamshire v Cambridge University
- Last First-class: 21 June 1963 Somerset v Pakistan Eaglets

Career statistics
Competition	First-class
Matches	2
Runs scored	65
Batting average	32.50
100s/50s	–/–
Top score	24
Balls bowled	277
Wickets	8
Bowling average	20.25
5 wickets in innings	1
10 wickets in match	–
Best bowling	8/88
Catches/stumpings	–/–
- Source: CricketArchive, 20 May 2011

Cleveland Vincent Lindo (6 June 1936 – 6 January 2023) was a Jamaican cricketer. He played first-class cricket in one match for Nottinghamshire in 1960 and in another single match for Somerset in 1963. He was born at Bigwoods, St Elizabeth.

Lindo was a right-arm fast bowler and a right-handed lower order batsman. In his solitary match for Nottinghamshire in 1960, he did better with bat than ball, making 18 and 24 batting at No 9, but failing to take a wicket in 20 overs in the match as Cambridge University recorded their first victory at Fenner's for four seasons. Lindo played for Nottinghamshire's second eleven in the Second Eleven Championship in 1960 (though not in second eleven matches in the Minor Counties Championship), but did not win a recall to the first team or a renewal of his contract at the end of the season. In 1963, Lindo reappeared in senior cricket again, playing for Somerset, though again he was largely confined to the second team. As before, he had a single first-class match, this time in the game against the Pakistan Eaglets, a touring side of young players from Pakistan, some of whom went on to become Test players. In a Somerset side that also featured several younger players alongside the established Peter Wight and the Test bowler Fred Rumsey, Lindo made an unbeaten 23 when Somerset batted in a match affected by rain, and then took eight wickets for 88 runs in the Pakistan Eaglets' only innings, including those of future Test players Mushtaq Mohammad and Sadiq Mohammad. The bowling included a spell of five wickets for one run in 17 deliveries with the second new ball. Despite this performance, and with Somerset's bowling very strong, Lindo was not picked for the first team again, and did not play any further first-class cricket.

After leaving Somerset, Lindo played Minor Counties cricket for Staffordshire and appeared in charity matches for the International Cavaliers side.

Lindo was married to Phyllis, and had one daughter, Sonja. He died on 6 January 2023, at the age of 86.
