= Women & Children First (bookstore) =

Bookstore in Chicago, Illinois, United States

Coordinates: 41.9773°N 87.6682°W

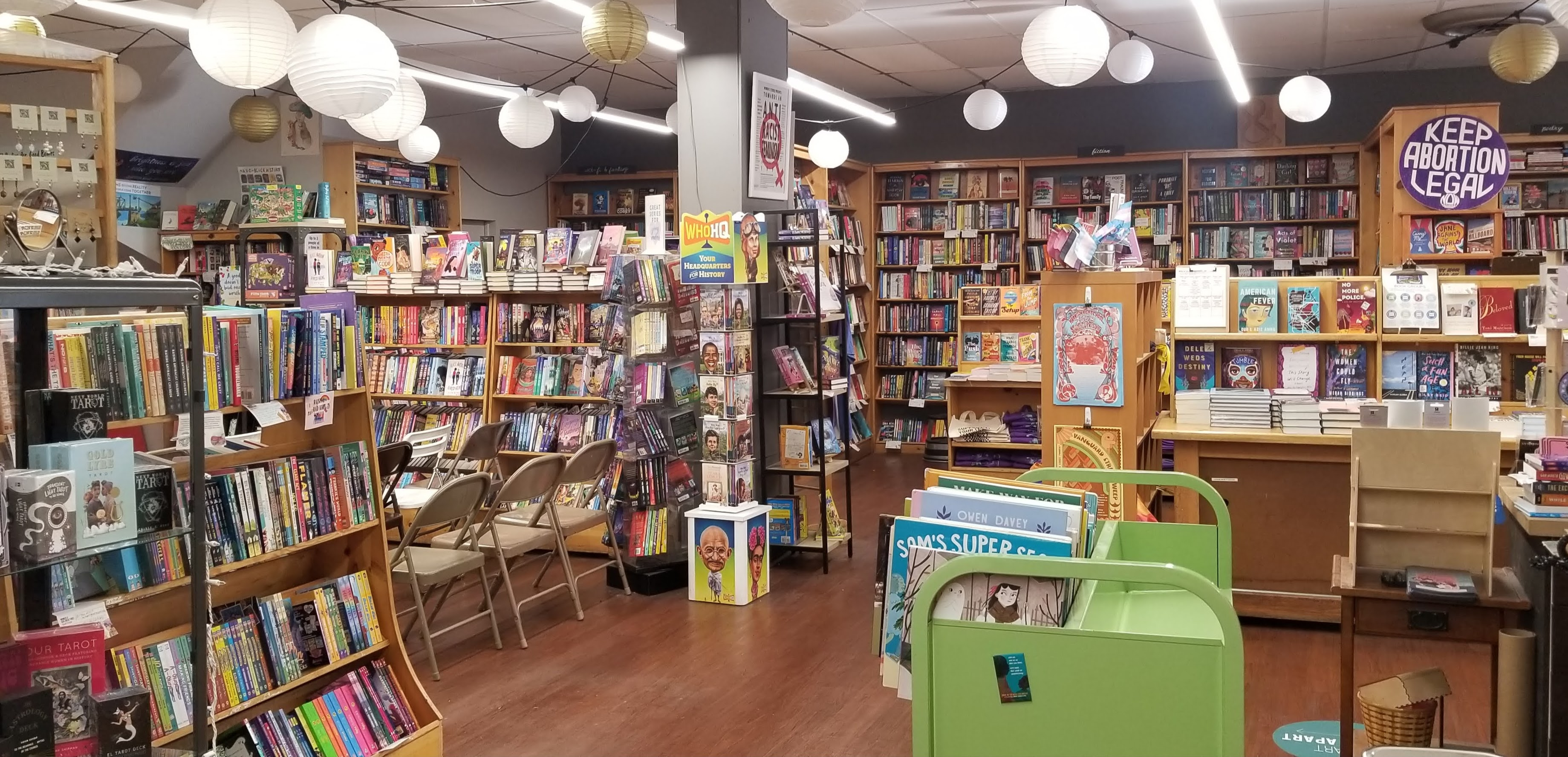
- Interior of Women & Children First (August 2022)
- Type: Book store
- Founded: 1979
- Founders: Ann Christophersen and Linda Bubon
- Headquarters: Chicago, Illinois, United States
- Owners: Lynn Mooney and Sarah Hollenbeck
- Website: womenandchildrenfirst.com

Women & Children First is an independent bookstore located at 5233 North Clark Street in the Andersonville neighborhood in Chicago. The store was founded in 1979 by Ann Christophersen and Linda Bubon as a feminist bookstore and place to celebrate and support women authors and members of the Chicago community. Women & Children First specializes in books by and about women, children's books, and LGBT literature.

== Description ==
Women & Children First is one of the largest feminist bookstores in the United States, with about 30,000 books in stock.

Books are "curated with an inclusive and queer-minded lens" and the store is "known for its diversity and queer-friendliness." One of the goals of the bookstore is to "support the work of women in books and in community". Women & Children First carries not only important feminist literary works, but also focuses on works related to other political and progressive movements, with a particularly strong selection of books by and about the LGBT community. Children's books make up twenty percent of the store's sales; other popular categories are cookbooks, art books, education, and parenting.

Author readings and signings are frequent events, as are events for children such as drag queen story time. Notable speakers at the store have included former president Jimmy Carter, Gloria Steinem, Margaret Atwood, Alice Walker, Studs Terkel, and other activists and literary figures. Since a renovation in 2015, which provided additional event space, more community-oriented activities have taken place there, including writing workshops, support groups, and social activities for local community groups.

== History ==
Women & Children First was founded in November 1979 by Ann Christophersen and Linda Bubon, students at the University of Illinois at Chicago. They were part of the feminist movement and saw a market need when they had a difficulty finding books by the women authors they wanted to study. Bubon and Christophersen built the store's bookshelves themselves and spent $15,000 on stocking the store with feminist-themed material and children's books which promoted girls as active agents. Women & Children First's first location was located on Armitage Avenue in the Lakeview neighborhood; in the 1980s they moved to a location on Halsted Avenue, and settled in Andersonville in its current location in 1990.

The bookstore had steady growth from its opening until the early 1990s, but struggled financially when large bookstore chains moved into Chicago. The store adjusted by selling textbooks and making staffing changes, but when Amazon and other Internet retailers sold books for far less than retail price as loss leaders in the early 2000s, Women & Children First faced some of its hardest years.

In 2014, owners Bubon and Christophersen sold Women & Children First to two of their employees, Lynn Mooney and Sarah Hollenbeck. The next year, extensive renovations were completed for a dedicated events and community space for author readings and community group meetings, and a mural was created illustrating notable woman authors who had spoken at the bookstore. The 2016 presidential election energized young feminists, increasing foot traffic and visits to the store's website, and the store rebounded financially in the late 2010s.

For its 40th anniversary in 2019, Women & Children First held a block party outside the bookstore and hosted a panel of the store's former and current owners as well as presenting a list of the store's top 20 all-time best-sellers, with books including My Life on the Road by Gloria Steinem, Bad Feminist by Roxane Gay, and The House on Mango Street by Sandra Cisneros.

== In popular culture ==
TV series Portlandia gently mocked feminist bookstores, including Women & Children First, in a recurring sketch titled "Women and Women First," which was filmed in Portland feminist bookstore In Other Words.
