= Linda Sobeh =

Palestinian diplomat (born 1968)

Linda Sobeh Ali
- ليندا صبح علي
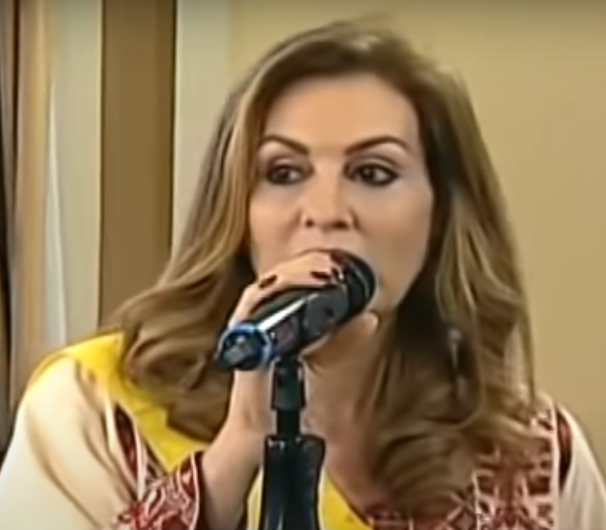
- Linda Sobeh in 2020

Personal details
- Born: 1968 (age 56–57); Ramallah
- Political party: Fatah
- Occupation: Diplomat

Linda Sobeh Ali (Arabic: ليندا صبح علي; born 1968) is a Palestinian diplomat who has been State of Palestine's Ambassador Extraordinary and Plenipotentiary for Caribbean Affairs since 2024. She served as Palestine's ambassador to Venezuela from 2012 to 2020.

== Biography ==
Born in Ramallah, she lived in the United States where she was president of the Palestinian American Congress. She later served at the headquarters of the Palestinian Ministry of Foreign Affairs. Between 2010 and 2011 she was chargé d'affaires of the Palestinian National Authority in Canada. During her tenure in Canada, the government of Stephen Harper refused to recognize Palestine as a state.

In October 2011, following a post on the social media site Twitter, where she shared a video of a Palestinian girl reciting a poem that was deemed offensive to Jews, the Canadian government declared her persona non grata and asked for her removal from the country. Sobeh later expressed regret over the malicious incident and tendered her resignation from office. Regarding the poem, Salah Basalamah of the School of Translation and Interpretation at the University of Ottawa referred to errors in the translation from Arabic to English, stating that the poem speaks of fighting Zionism and not the Jewish people.

She was appointed Palestinian ambassador to Venezuela since 5 March 2012. On November 9, 2016, she presented her credentials as non-resident ambassador of the State of Palestine in Guyana. After that, she met with high-ranking Guyanese politicians and the Muslim community of that country. In early 2017, she announced that she would present her credentials in Haiti and Saint Vincent and the Grenadines in the Caribbean. Before the latter state she did so on 8 March 2017, being the first Palestinian representative.

During her tenure in Venezuela, bilateral relations were strengthened due to the support of the governments of Hugo Chávez and Nicolás Maduro for the Palestinian cause. In May 2016, she inaugurated the headquarters of the Palestinian embassy in Caracas together with the Venezuelan foreign minister Delcy Rodríguez and her Palestinian counterpart Riyad al-Maliki.

In January 2022, she made her first visit to Barbados. In 2024, she became the first Palestinian ambassador to Antigua and Barbuda.

== Personal life ==
In addition to her native Arabic, she speaks English and Spanish. She has one daughter.

== See also ==
- Palestine–Venezuela relations
