= Linda J. Silberman =

American lawyer

Linda J. Silberman is an American lawyer, currently the Martin Lipton Professor of Law at New York University.
