= LinkedIn Learning =

Online education company

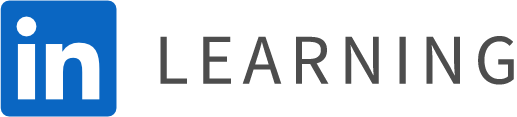
- Formerly: Lynda.com (1995-2017)
- Type: Subsidiary
- Industry: E-learning
- Founded: 1995; 31 years ago
- Founders: Lynda Weinman; Bruce Heavin
- Headquarters: Carpinteria
- Services: Online education; Online publishing
- Parent: LinkedIn (2015-present)
- Website: linkedin.com/learning

LinkedIn Learning is an American global massive open online course provider. It provides video courses taught by industry experts in software, creative, and business skills. It is a subsidiary of LinkedIn. All the courses on LinkedIn fall into four categories: Business, Creative, Technology, and Certifications.

It was founded in 1995 by Lynda Weinman as Lynda.com before being acquired by LinkedIn in 2015 and becoming LinkedIn Learning. Microsoft acquired LinkedIn in December 2016.

== History ==
LinkedIn Learning was founded as Lynda.com in 1995 in Ojai, California, initially serving as an online resource to support the books and classes of Lynda Weinman, a special effects animator and multimedia professor who founded a digital arts school with her husband, artist Bruce Heavin.

The company expanded into online education in 2002, offering digital courses through its platform. By 2004, its catalog had grown to approximately 100 courses, and in 2008 it broadened its content offerings to include documentary-style features on creative professionals, artists, and entrepreneurs.

Lynda.com pursued both strategic acquisitions and external investment to support its growth. In February 2013, the company acquired video2brain, an Austrian-based provider of online classes in web design and programming, available in German, French, Spanish, and English. The following year, it acquired Compilr, a Canadian startup offering an online coding editor and sandbox environment.

During this period, Lynda.com also secured its first major outside funding. In 2013, it raised $103 million (~$136 million in 2024) in growth equity from Accel Partners, Spectrum Equity, and Meritech Capital Partners. On January 14, 2015, the company raised an additional $186 million (~$240 million in 2024) in financing led by TPG Capital.

LinkedIn announced its acquistion of Lynda.com in April 2015, completing the $1.5 billion transaction in May of that year. Following the acquisition, the platform continued to expand distribution, including an Apple TV application in 2016.

Microsoft announced that it would acquire Lynda.com's parent company LinkedIn for $26.2 billion (~$34.4 billion in 2025), which was completed in December 2016. In October 2017, Lynda.com was merged and renamed LinkedIn Learning. In 2019, the site announced that users accessing LinkedIn Learning through their public library would be required to create a LinkedIn profile in order to use the service; the decision faced criticism from librarians and the American Library Association. As of March 2021, libraries started migrating to LinkedIn Learning without requiring patrons to create a LinkedIn profile.

The original Lynda.com website was discontinued on June 2, 2021, and permanently redirects to LinkedIn Learning.

== See also ==
- FutureLearn
- Khan Academy
- List of MOOC providers
- Pluralsight
- EdX
- Coursera
- Udemy
- Udacity
