= Linda King (virologist) =

British virologist

Linda King FRSB
- Education: University of Liverpool (BSc) University of Oxford (DPhil)
- Scientific career
- Workplaces: University of Oxford, Oxford Brookes University

Linda King FRSB is a virologist in the UK. She is Professor of Virology and Pro Vice-Chancellor for Research and Global Partnerships at Oxford Brookes University.

== Education and career ==
King was a student at the University of Liverpool graduating with a BSc in Biochemistry and Cell Biology, she studied for her doctorate in molecular virology at the University of Oxford graduating in 1985 and then worked as a postdoctoral researcher and junior research fellow at Linacre College. The following year she moved to Oxford Brookes to work as a lecturer in virology and subsequently rose to professor in 1998.

== Research ==
King's research looks at insect viruses and focusses on baculovirus expression systems and their use in protein production.

In 1992 she wrote a book with Robert Possee, The Baculovirus Expression Vector System: A Laboratory Guide.

In 2006 King co-founded Oxford Expression Technologies, a spin out company of Oxford Brookes and NERC, which uses a Baculovirus-based protein expression platform to develop mammalian virus vaccines. In 2020 the company is involved in development of 'Covax-19', a vaccine against COVID-19.
