= Lynda Weinman =

American technology business executive

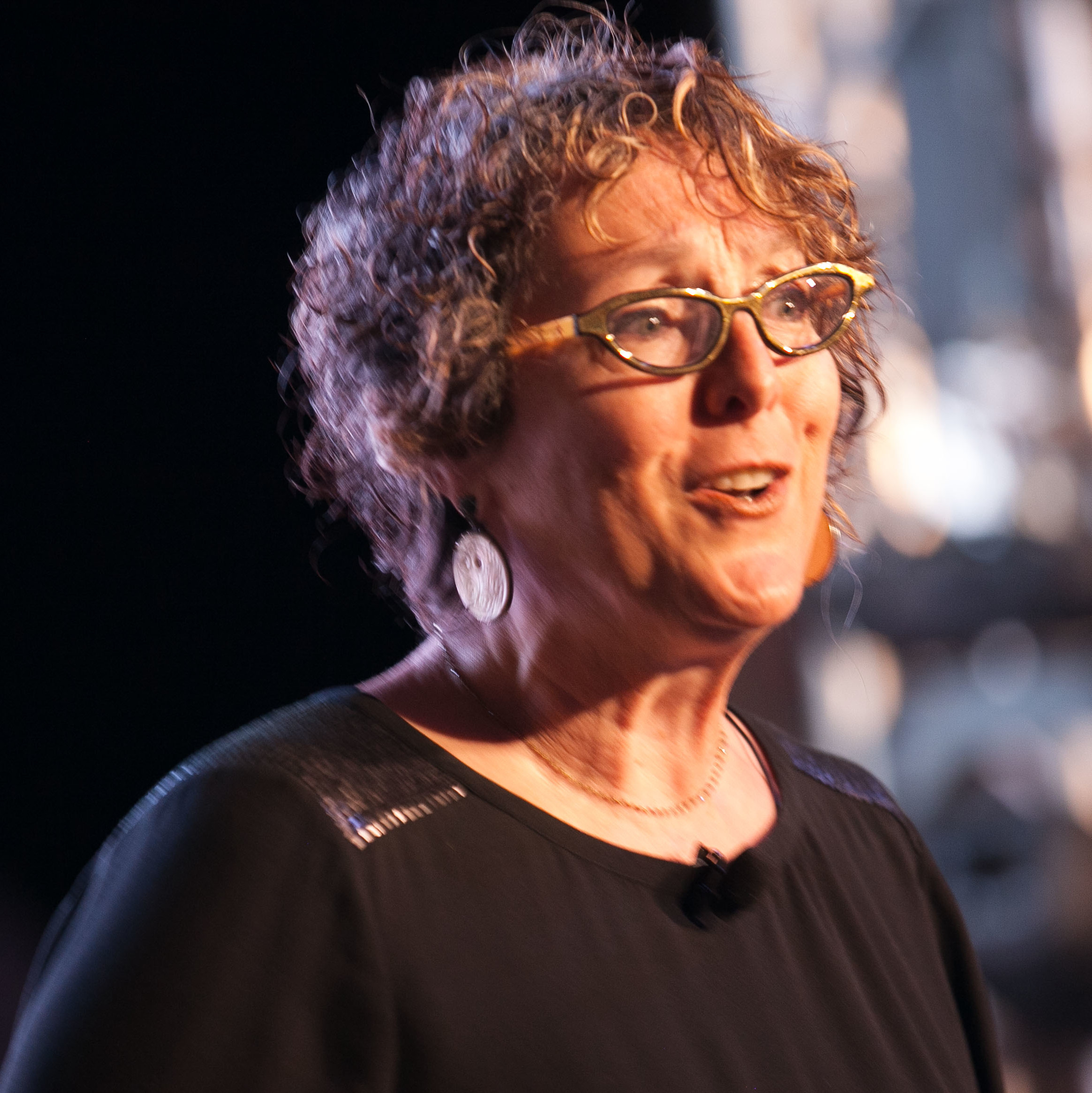
- Weinman in 2015
- Born: Lynda Susan Weinman; January 24, 1955 (age 71); Hollywood, California, U.S.
- Education: The Evergreen State College
- Occupations: co-founder Lynda.com, Author/Writer, Speaker
- Spouse: Bruce Heavin

Lynda Susan Weinman (born January 24, 1955) is an artist, American business owner, computer instructor, and author, who founded an online software training website, lynda.com, with her husband, Bruce Heavin. Lynda.com was acquired by online business network LinkedIn in April 2015 for $1.5 billion (~$1.99 billion in 2025).

Weinman, with self-taught computer skills, worked in the film industry as a special effects animator, and became a faculty member at ArtCenter College of Design, UCLA, American Film Institute, and San Francisco State University multimedia studies program teaching computer graphics, animation, interactive design, and motion graphics. She has also written several books.

== Education ==
Weinman graduated with a degree in humanities from The Evergreen State College in Olympia, Washington in 1976. In 2015, Weinman received an honorary doctorate from Otis College of Art and Design.

== Career ==
A year after graduating, Weinman opened two retail stores, Vertigo on Melrose and Vertigo on Sunset in Los Angeles. They closed in 1982.

Weinman worked for Dreamquest and as an independent contractor doing animation and special effects. She worked on several films, including RoboCop 2 (1990), Bill & Ted's Excellent Adventure (1989), and Star Trek V: The Final Frontier (1989).

Weinman attributes her initial interest in computers to her having taught herself how to use an Apple II. She acquired these skills by reading the manual.

Weinman taught digital media and motion graphics at Art Center College of Design in Pasadena, California from 1989 to 1996. Her book designing web graphics, published by New Riders in 1995, often is credited with being the first title to discuss web authoring technologies from a visual design perspective.

Weinman was co-founder with her husband, Bruce Heavin, of the Ojai Digital Arts Center in Ojai, California in 1999.

In March 2020, Weinman founded the site claybottress.com to detail her interest in and studies of 3D clay printing. She has had gallery and museum exhibits of the sculptures, vases, handbags, and jewelry she has designed and created with 3d printing technologies.

Weinman co-founded Clay Studio SB (now Maker House) in Goleta, California in 2020 with ceramicist Patrick J. Hall.

== Lynda.com ==
The Lynda.com Online Training Library taught computer skills in video format to members through monthly and annual subscription-based plans. The company was founded in Ojai, California and has since moved to Ventura and Carpinteria, California, where, as of 2013, it employed nearly 500 full-time staff members and more than 140 teachers who earn royalties from their shared revenue model. The company website was created in 1995 and the company was incorporated in 1997.

Lynda.com evolved from its original conception as a free web resource for Lynda's students, to the site for her books on web design, to the registration hub for physical classrooms and conferences, to an online virtual knowledge library, where members could watch software and technology courses in several categories (3D and animation, audio, business, design, development, home computing, photography, video, and web and interactive design). The company also produced documentaries about creative professionals.

The company received $103 million (~$140 million in 2025) in venture capital funding in January 2013, led by Accel Partners and Spectrum Equity. In April 2013, lynda.com laid off 45 of its 460 employees in order to "eliminate corporate operations redundancy." On January 14, 2015, lynda.com announced it had raised $186 million (~$247 million in 2025) in financing, led by investment group TPG Capital.

In 2013, Lynda.com acquired video2brain, an Austrian-based provider of online classes in web design and programming, available in German, French, Spanish, and English languages.

In 2014, it acquired Compilr, provider of an online editor and sandbox.

On April 7, 2015, LinkedIn acquired Lynda.com in a deal worth $1.5 billion (~$1.99 billion in 2025). The sale was immediately followed by a 10% cut in company staff. During the next half year, layoffs continued as Lynda.com departments were folded into LinkedIn.

== Flashforward conferences ==
Lynda.com and United Digital Artists Productions, Inc. (UAD) co-founded the Flashforward Conferences and the Flash Film Festival, which first took place in 1999. The Flashforward Conference, the first event focused on Macromedia Flash, held fourteen events in San Francisco, New York, London, and Amsterdam, serving more than 20,000 attendees over six years. The Flash Film Festival presented more than 200 awards to Flash sites and applications, to winners from more than 30 countries. The last scheduled conference took place in August 2008.

== Personal life ==
Weinman is married to Bruce Heavin. In the 1990s, Weinman dated Matt Groening and appears as a character in his early comic strip, Life in Hell.

== Works ==
Weinman has authored or co-authored sixteen books as well as numerous magazine articles.

=== Books ===
- Weinman, Lynda (January 1996). designing web graphics. New Riders Publishing. p. 258. ISBN 1-56205-532-1.
- Weinman, Lynda; Heavin, Bruce; Karp, Ali (November 1996). coloring web graphics. New Riders Publishing. p. 295. ISBN 1-56205-669-7.
- Weinman, Lynda (February 1997). designing web graphics.2. New Riders Publishing. p. 447. ISBN 1-56205-715-4.
- Weinman, Lynda (May 1997). preparing web graphics. New Riders Publishing. p. 238. ISBN 1-56205-686-7.
- Weinman, Lynda; Heavin, Bruce; Karp, Ali (September 1997). coloring web graphics.2. New Riders Publishing. p. 314. ISBN 1-56205-818-5.
- Weinman, Lynda; Weinman, William (January 1998). creative html design. New Riders Publishing. p. 434. ISBN 1-56205-704-9.
- Weinman, Lynda; Warren Lentz, Jon (May 1998). deconstructing web graphics. New Riders Publishing. p. 229. ISBN 1-56205-859-2.
- Weinman, Lynda (March 1999). designing web graphics.3. New Riders Publishing. p. 480. ISBN 1-56205-949-1.
- Weinman, Lynda (March 2000). Photoshop 5.5 and ImageReady 2.0 Hands-On Training. Peachpit Press. p. 512. ISBN 0-201-35467-5.
- Weinman, Lynda; Weinman, William (April 2001). creative html design.2. Waite Group Press. p. 544. ISBN 0-7357-0972-6.
- Weinman, Lynda; Kabili, Jan (October 2001). Photoshop 6 / ImageReady 3 Hands-On Training. Pearson Education. p. 672. ISBN 0-201-72796-X.
- Weinman, Lynda; Newman, Craig (July 2002). After Effects 5.0/5.5 Hands-On Training. Peachpit Press. p. 648. ISBN 0-201-75469-X.
- Weinman, Lynda; Kabili, Jan (December 2002). Photoshop 7 / ImageReady For the Web Hands-On Training. Peachpit Press. p. 616. ISBN 0-321-11276-8.
- Weinman, Lynda (January 2003). designing web graphics.4. New Riders Publishing. p. 552. ISBN 0-7357-1079-1.
- Weinman, Lynda (December 2003). Adobe After Effects 6 Hands-On Training. Peachpit Press. p. 672. ISBN 0-321-22854-5.
- Weinman, Lynda; Fahs, Chad (August 2006). Adobe After Effects 7 Hands-On Training. Peachpit Press; Bk&CD-Rom edition. p. 528. ISBN 0-321-39775-4.

=== Magazine articles ===
- Web; Better Web Graphics with Transparency. Macworld, October 1998
- A Web graphics primer. Macworld, May 1998
- Tile your site: use tiles to create the layered look on your Web pages. Macworld, May 1998
- Preparing Web graphics. Macworld, August 1996
- Lynda Weinman on What's Next for Flash in 2006. PeachPit, January 6, 2006.
- Web Design Tips: Making Site Comps and Prototypes. CreativePro.com, August 13, 2003.

== Awards ==
- GirlGeeks Golden Horn-Rims Award recipient, 2000,
- First Hollywood Film Festival's Discovery CyberAwards Nominee, 10.14.1997.
- Entrepreneur of the Year finalist, Ernst & Young Entrepreneur Of The Year 2010 Regional Awards.
- Entrepreneur of the Year, South Coast Business and Technology Awards
- 2011 Women of Achievement Award, Association for Women in Communications, Santa Barbara chapter (AWC-SB)

== Boards ==
- Santa Barbara International Film Festival
- Lotusland
- AIGA National Board Member, 2009-
- The Evergreen State College Foundation Board of Governors & Trustees, 2004-

== Philanthropy ==
Weinman is the namesake and benefactor for the 'Lynda Lab', the Experimental Effects Lab in the Center for Creative and Applied Media (CCAM) at her alma mater, Evergreen State College. The foundation has a pledge from Weinman and husband, Bruce Heavin, to establish an endowment supporting equipment in the CCAM. Weinman and Heavin also have contributed to scholarships at Art Center College of Design, as well as an ongoing endowment for additional scholarships.
