= Linda Garcia =

Linda Garcia may refer to:

- Linda Garcia (environmentalist), American environmental activist
- Linda Garcia (politician), American financial educator and politician for Texas
- Linda Garcia Cubero (born 1958), former United States Air Force officer
- Linda Garcia Benavides, American politician for New Mexico
