= Linda (Linda George album) =

Studio album by Miss Linda George
- Released: August 1974
- Studio: Armstrong Studios, Melbourne
- Genre: Soul; pop
- Label: Image
- Producer: Jack Richardson

Miss Linda George chronology
| Linda (1974) | Step by Step (1975) |

Linda is the début album by Australian soul-pop singer, Linda George, which was issued via Image Records in August 1974. The artist was billed as Miss Linda George, as on her 45 rpm single releases. It was produced by Canadian Jack Richardson at Armstrong Studios in Melbourne. The album peaked at No. 32 on the Kent Music Report Albums Chart. Linda provided a top 10 single, "Mama's Little Girl" (July) on the related Kent Music Report Singles Chart, and a second single, "Give It Love" (December).

== Track listing ==
Image Records (ILP-741)

1. Hard to Be Friends (Larry Murray) – 3.10
2. Indian Summer (Edmund Villareal, Wanda Watkins) – 3.12
3. The Singer (Barry Mann, Cynthia Weil) – 4.21
4. Mama's Little Girl (Dennis Lambert, Brian Potter) – 3.44
5. You and Me Against the World (Paul Williams, Kenneth Ascher) – 3.46
6. How May Days (Stevie Wonder) – 3.47
7. Give It Love (Mann, Weil) – 3.16
8. Memphis Nights (Tim Martin, Walt Meskell) – 4.17
9. Love Me (Tom Baird, Nick Zesses, Dino Fekaris) – 3.19
10. Between Her Goodbye and My Hello (Jim Weatherly) – 3.11

== Charts ==
| Chart (1974) | Peak position |
|---|---|
| Australian (Kent Music Report) | 32 |

== Personnel ==
Musicians

- Linda George – lead vocals
- Mike Burke – steel guitar
- Wendy, Beverly and Margaret Cook (of Marcie and the Cookies); Howard Gable; Terry Dean – backing vocals
- Geoff Cox – drums
- Peter Martin – guitars (electric, acoustic)
- Ian Mason – keyboards
- Barry "Big Goose" Sullivan – bass guitar

Recording details

- Producer – Jack Richardson for Nimbus Nine Productions at Armstrong Studios, Melbourne
- Audio engineer – Roger Savage at Armstrong Studios, Melbourne
- Arranger, conductor – Peter Martin
