= Linda, Missouri =

Extinct hamlet in Missouri, U.S.

Coordinates: 36°24′39″N 89°32′49″W

Linda is an extinct town in New Madrid County, in the U.S. state of Missouri. The GNIS classifies it as a populated place.

A post office called Linda was established in 1901, and remained in operation until 1922. The community was named after Linda Stewart, an early settler.
