= 1962 in music =

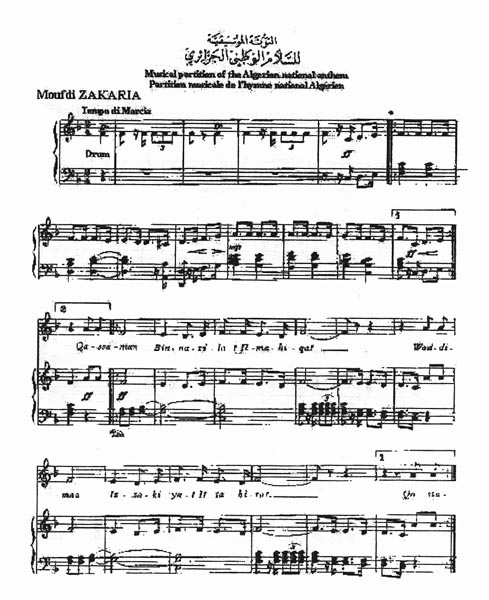
Algerian national anthem, 1962

This is a list of notable events in music that took place in the year 1962.

== Specific locations ==
- 1962 in British music
- 1962 in Japanese music
- 1962 in Norwegian music

== Specific genres ==
- 1962 in country music
- 1962 in jazz

== Events ==
- January 1 – The Beatles and Brian Poole and the Tremeloes both audition at Decca Records in London. Decca has the option of signing one group only. The Beatles are rejected, perhaps because they come from Liverpool and the others are Dagenham-based, nearer London.
- January 5 – The first album on which The Beatles play, My Bonnie, as backing to Tony Sheridan (recorded the previous June in Hamburg and produced by Bert Kaempfert), is released by Polydor.
- January 24 – Brian Epstein signs a contract to manage The Beatles.
- February 16 – Conductor Bruno Walter, the day before his death, ends his last letter with: "Despite all the dark experiences of today I am still confident that Palestrina will remain. The work has all the elements of immortality".
- March 18 – The 7th Eurovision Song Contest, held at Villa Louvigny in Luxembourg City, is won by France with the song "Un premier amour", performed by Isabelle Aubret.
- March 19 – Bob Dylan releases his debut album, Bob Dylan, in the United States, featuring mostly folk standards.
- April 6 – New York Philharmonic concert of April 6, 1962: Leonard Bernstein causes controversy with his remarks before a concert featuring Glenn Gould with the New York Philharmonic, when he (Bernstein) announces that although he disagrees with Gould's slow tempi in Brahms' Piano Concerto No. 1, he finds Gould's ideas fascinating and will conduct the piece anyway. Bernstein's action receives a withering review from The New York Times music critic Harold C. Schonberg.
- April 7 – Mick Jagger and Keith Richards meet Brian Jones at The Ealing Club, a blues club in London.
- April 12 – A recording is made of Bob Dylan's concert at the Town Hall, in New York City by Columbia Records. (Columbia eventually release the recording of "Tomorrow is a Long Time" from this concert.)
- April 24 – Bob Dylan begins recording The Freewheelin' Bob Dylan in New York.
- May 29 – The 4th Annual Grammy Awards are held in Chicago, Los Angeles and New York. Henry Mancini wins the most awards with five, including Record of the Year and Song of the Year for his song "Moon River". Judy Garland's Judy at Carnegie Hall wins Album of the Year, while Peter Nero wins Best New Artist.
- June 6 – The Beatles play their first session at EMI's Abbey Road Studios in London, having signed with the Parlophone label on May 9.
- June 19 – The film version of the musical The Music Man is released in the United States by Warner Bros.
- August 2 – Robert Allen Zimmerman legally changes his name to Bob Dylan in the New York Supreme Court.
- August 16 – The Beatles fire drummer Pete Best and replace him with Ringo Starr.
- August 17 – Instrumental single "Telstar", written and produced by Joe Meek for English band The Tornados, is released in the UK. On December 22 it will be the first recording by a British group ever to reach the top spot on the Billboard Top 100 in the United States, proving to be a precursor to the British Invasion.
- August 18 – The Beatles play their first live engagement with the line-up of John, Paul, George and Ringo, at Hulme Hall, Port Sunlight, UK.
- August 20 – Albert Grossman becomes Bob Dylan's manager.
- August 23 – John Lennon marries Cynthia Powell in an unpublicised register office ceremony at Mount Pleasant, Liverpool, with Paul McCartney as best man.
- September 21 – New Musical Express, the British music magazine, publishes a story about two 13-year-old schoolgirls, Sue and Mary, releasing a disc on Decca and adds "A Liverpool group, The Beatles, have recorded 'Love Me Do' for Parlophone Records, set for October 5 release."
- September 22 – Bob Dylan appears for the first time at Carnegie Hall in New York City as part of a hootenanny including the first public performance of "A Hard Rain's a-Gonna Fall".
- September 23 – Opening concert at the New York Philharmonic's new home, Philharmonic Hall at Lincoln Center for the Performing Arts, conducted by Leonard Bernstein and broadcast live on television across the United States by NBC. The opening work, Aaron Copland's specially commissioned Connotations, sends "shock waves through the world of music". Other commissions featured include Darius Milhaud's Overture Philharmonique and Samuel Barber's Andromache's Farewell for soprano and orchestra. The following day, John Browning premières Barber's Piano Concerto at the venue and on October 4 William Schuman's Symphony No. 8 is premièred here.
- October 5 – The Beatles' first single in their own right, "Love Me Do"/"P.S. I Love You", is released in the UK on EMI's Parlophone label.
- October 14 – Italian tenor Sergio Franchi makes his American TV debut on The Ed Sullivan Show.
- October 17 – The Beatles make their first televised appearance, on Granada television's local news programme People and Places in the north of England.
- October 20 – Peter, Paul and Mary's self-titled debut album reaches No. 1 on the Billboard 200 album chart.
- October 21 – Sergio Franchi makes his American concert debut at Carnegie Hall (sans microphone), promoted by Sol Hurok.
- November 11
  - Ken Russell's film Elgar is shown in BBC Television's Monitor series in the United Kingdom.
  - Joan Baez has all of her first three albums on the Billboard charts, on their way to Gold status.
- Two Pete Seeger classic songs reach the Billboard pop charts:
  - "Where Have All the Flowers Gone?" recorded by The Kingston Trio reaches No. 21.
  - "If I Had a Hammer", recorded by Peter, Paul and Mary, reaches No. 10.
- The first American Folk Blues Festival, initiated by German promoters, tours Europe; artists include Sonny Terry, Brownie McGhee and T-Bone Walker. Its only UK date, 21 October at the Free Trade Hall, Manchester, is influential on the British R&B scene, with the audience including Mick Jagger, Keith Richards and Brian Jones of The Rolling Stones with Jimmy Page, Paul Jones, John Mayall and other musicians, and with a second show filmed and shown on Independent Television.
- Georges Auric becomes director of the Opéra National de Paris.
- André Hodeir's book, Since Debussy, makes controversial claims about the importance of Jean Barraqué as a composer.
- José Manuel Calderón becomes the first Dominican musician to record bachata, at the Radiotelevisión Dominicana studios.
- The Spokane Philharmonic orchestra becomes the Spokane Symphony.
- Dalida is named Calabrian Citizen of Honour and receives the Radio Monte Carlo Oscar with Johnny Hallyday.
- Paul & Paula make their first appearance together while attending Howard Payne College in Brownwood, Texas.
- The Mashed Potato is a popular dance craze, with several songs based around the style.
- The Gulbenkian Orchestra is founded, originally as a 12-piece chamber ensemble, the Orquestra de Câmara Gulbenkian, in Lisbon (Portugal).
- Lou Harrison visits Taiwan; on his return he forms, with William Colvig, Richard Dee and Lily Chin, the first American ensemble to play traditional Chinese music.
- Sergio Franchi is signed to an RCA Red Seal recording contract in London by Norman Luboff.

== Bands formed ==
- Booker T. & the MG's
- Herman's Hermits
- Koerner, Ray & Glover
- The Rolling Stones
- The Trashmen
- Question Mark and the Mysterians
- The Routers

== Albums released ==
- Adam Faith – Adam Faith
- After Hours – Joni James
- Album Seven by Rick – Rick Nelson
- Alice Faye Sings Her Famous Movie Hits – Alice Faye
- Along Comes Ruth – Ruth Brown
- All Aboard the Blue Train – Johnny Cash
- All Alone – Frank Sinatra
- All the Sad Young Men – Anita O'Day
- Baby It's You – The Shirelles
- Bashin': The Unpredictable Jimmy Smith – Jimmy Smith
- Because You're Mine – Keely Smith
- Ben E. King Sings for Soulful Lovers
- The Best of Ball, Barber And Bilk – Kenny Ball, Chris Barber, and Acker Bilk
- The Best of Irving Berlin's Songs from Mr. President – Perry Como with Kaye Ballard and Sandy Stewart
- The Best of Julie – Julie London
- The Best of Sam Cooke – Sam Cooke
- Bewitching-Lee – Peggy Lee
- Big Band Percussion – Ted Heath and His Music
- Big Band Specials – June Christy
- Billy Rose's Jumbo – Soundtrack
- Blues Cross Country – Peggy Lee
- Bobby Vee Meets the Crickets – Bobby Vee and The Crickets
- A Bobby Vee Recording Session – Bobby Vee
- Bobby Vee's Golden Greats – Bobby Vee
- Bob Dylan – Bob Dylan (debut album)
- Bo Diddley – Bo Diddley
- Bo Diddley & Company – Bo Diddley
- Bo Diddley's a Twister – Bo Diddley
- Bobby Darin Sings Ray Charles – Bobby Darin
- Bouquet of Roses – Les Paul and Mary Ford
- The Bridge - Sonny Rollins
- Buddy and Soul – Buddy Greco
- Bursting Out with the All–Star Big Band! – Oscar Peterson
- By Request – Perry Como
- Cafrune – Jorge Cafrune
- Cal Tjader Plays Harold Arlen – Cal Tjader
- Cal Tjader Plays the Contemporary Music of Mexico and Brazil – Cal Tjader
- The Cannonball Adderley Sextet in New York – Cannonball Adderley Sextet
- Cannonball in Europe! – Cannonball Adderley
- Cha Cha de Amor – Dean Martin
- Cherokeely Swings – Keely Smith
- The Chipmunk Songbook - Alvin and the Chipmunks
- Christmas with The Chipmunks - Alvin and the Chipmunks
- Chuck Berry Twist – Chuck Berry
- The Classic Della – Della Reese
- Close Up In Swing – Erroll Garner
- Coltrane – John Coltrane
- Come Waltz with Me – Steve Lawrence
- Comin' Home Baby – Mel Tormé
- Crying – Roy Orbison
- Dance with Ike & Tina Turner's Kings of Rhythm – Kings of Rhythm
- Danny Boy and Other Songs I Love to Sing – Andy Williams
- Dear Lonely Hearts – Nat King Cole
- Dinah '62 – Dinah Washington
- Dino: Italian Love Songs – Dean Martin
- Dino Latino – Dean Martin
- Dizzy on the French Riviera – Dizzy Gillespie
- Don't Go in the Lion's Cage Tonight – Julie Andrews
- Don't Mess with Tess – Teresa Brewer
- Don't Worry 'Bout Me – Billy Eckstine
- Drinking Again – Dinah Washington
- Duet – Doris Day with André Previn
- Dynamite! – Ike & Tina Turner
- The Electrifying Aretha Franklin – Aretha Franklin
- Ella Swings Brightly with Nelson – Ella Fitzgerald
- Ella Swings Gently with Nelson – Ella Fitzgerald
- The Fabulous Hits of Dinah Shore – Dinah Shore
- The First Family – Vaughn Meader
- First Time Out – Clare Fischer
- Folklore – Jorge Cafrune
- For Those Who Think Young – Joanie Sommers
- For Twisters Only – Chubby Checker
- French Style – Dean Martin
- Full House – Wes Montgomery
- The Garland Touch – Judy Garland
- The Gift of Love – Jack Jones
- Girls! Girls! Girls! (soundtrack) – Elvis Presley
- Go – Dexter Gordon
- Go On Home – Patti Page
- Golden Age of Donegan – Lonnie Donegan
- Gospel Time – Ruth Brown
- Great Motion Picture Themes – Various Artists
- Hancock – Tony Hancock
- Hello Young Lovers – Nancy Wilson
- High Flying – Lambert, Hendricks & Ross
- Hits Of The Rockin' 50s – Bobby Vee
- Horn A-Plenty – Al Hirt
- Howlin' Wolf – Howlin' Wolf
- Howling Wolf Sings the Blues – Howlin' Wolf (released, recorded 1951–52)
- Hymns from the Heart – Johnny Cash
- I Cry by Night – Kay Starr
- I Feel a Song Coming On – Joni James
- I Left My Heart In San Francisco – Tony Bennett
- I Wanna Be Loved – Dinah Washington
- I'm Your Girl – Joni James
- In Love – Dinah Washington
- In Other Words – Petula Clark
- India's Most Distinguished Musician in Concert – Ravi Shankar
- Instant Party! – Everly Brothers
- It's Trad, Dad! (OST) – Various Artists
- I've Got a Lot of Livin' to Do – Jack Jones
- Jazz Samba – Stan Getz and Charlie Byrd
- Jazz Workshop Revisited – Cannonball Adderley
- Let's Talk About Love – Joanie Sommers
- Joan Baez in Concert – Joan Baez
- Johnny Get Angry – Joanie Sommers
- Jorge Cafrune – Jorge Cafrune
- Just Plain Country – Kay Starr
- Lena...Lovely and Alive – Lena Horne
- Lena on the Blue Side – Lena Horne
- Let's Face the Music – Shirley Bassey with the Nelson Riddle Orchestra
- Let's Go! with The Routers – The Routers
- Let's Love – Buddy Greco
- Let's Talk About Love – Joanie Sommers
- Limbo Party - Chubby Checker
- Linger Awhile with Vic Damone – Vic Damone
- Live at the Diplomat – Damita Jo
- The Lively Ones – Vic Damone
- Love Letters – Julie London
- Love Makes the World Go 'Round – Anna Maria Alberghetti
- Lovers Who Wander - Dion
- Marion Montgomery Swings for Winners and Losers – Marion Montgomery
- Matt Monro – Matt Monro
- Miles Davis at Carnegie Hall – Miles Davis
- A Million Dollars' Worth Of Twang Volume 2 – Duane Eddy
- Modern Sounds in Country and Western Music – Ray Charles
- Modern Sounds in Country and Western Music Volume Two – Ray Charles
- Moon Beams – Bill Evans
- Moon River and Other Great Movie Themes – Andy Williams
- More Cole Español – Nat King Cole
- Mr. Broadway – Tony Bennett
- The Music Man (OST) – Various Artists
- My Bonnie – Tony Sheridan
- My Son, the Folk Singer – Allan Sherman
- Nancy Wilson/Cannonball Adderley – Nancy Wilson and Cannonball Adderley
- Nat King Cole Sings/George Shearing Plays – Nat King Cole and the George Shearing Quintet
- Nina at the Village Gate – Nina Simone
- Nina Simone Sings Ellington – Nina Simone
- No Strings – La Vern Baker, Chris Connor, Bobby Short
- Oh! Look at Me Now – Bobby Darin
- On Stage with the George Mitchell Minstrels – George Mitchell Minstrels
- On the Way Up – Ann-Margret
- Out of the Shadows – The Shadows
- Past Midnight – Margaret Whiting
- Patti Page Sings Golden Hits of the Boys – Patti Page
- Peter, Paul and Mary – Peter, Paul and Mary
- A Picture of You – Joe Brown
- Poema de Amor – Elis Regina
- Point of No Return – Frank Sinatra
- Porgy and Bess – Original Soundtrack
- Pot Luck – Elvis Presley
- Ramblin' Rose – Nat King Cole
- Rapture – Johnny Mathis
- The Real Ambassadors – Dave Brubeck, Louis Armstrong, Carmen McRae, and Lambert, Hendricks & Ross
- Rock 'N' Roll No.2 – Elvis Presley (re-issue)
- Romantic Italian Songs – Sergio Franchi
- Roy Orbison's Greatest Hits – Roy Orbison
- Rhythm Is My Business – Ella Fitzgerald
- S Wonderful 'S Marvellous – Ray Conniff
- Sacred Songs – Harry Secombe
- Sammy Davis Jr. All-Star Spectacular – Sammy Davis Jr.
- Sammy Davis Jr. Belts the Best of Broadway – Sammy Davis Jr.
- Sarah + 2 – Sarah Vaughan
- See See Rider – La Vern Baker
- Sentimentally Yours – Patsy Cline
- The Shirelles and King Curtis Give a Twist Party – The Shirelles and King Curtis
- Side by Side – Sandler & Young
- Sinatra and Strings – Frank Sinatra
- Sinatra and Swingin' Brass – Frank Sinatra
- Sinatra Sings Great Songs from Great Britain – Frank Sinatra
- Sinatra Sings of Love and Things – Frank Sinatra
- Sinatra–Basie: An Historic Musical First – Frank Sinatra and Count Basie
- Sincerely Yours – Robert Goulet
- Sing Something Simple – Cliff Adams Singers
- Something Warm – Oscar Peterson
- The Song Is Paris – Jackie Paris
- Sophisticated Lady – Julie London
- Soul – Timi Yuro
- The Sound of Johnny Cash – Johnny Cash
- Strange Enchantment – Vic Damone
- Sugar 'n' Spice – Peggy Lee
- Surfin' Safari – The Beach Boys
- Swinging All the Way with Frances Faye – Frances Faye
- Take Good Care of My Baby – Bobby Vee
- Takin' Off – Herbie Hancock
- Time for 2 – Anita O'Day and Cal Tjader
- Tears and Laughter – Dinah Washington
- The Tender, the Moving, the Swinging Aretha Franklin – Aretha Franklin
- Things and Other Things – Bobby Darin
- 32 Minutes and 17 Seconds – Cliff Richard and The Shadows
- This Is Anita – Anita O'Day
- This Was My Love – Jack Jones
- Tijuana Moods – Charles Mingus
- Time for Two – Anita O'Day and Cal Tjader
- Tony Bennett at Carnegie Hall – Tony Bennett
- Tope Puestro – Jorge Cafrune
- Tops with Me – Helen Shapiro
- Tribute to Uncle Ray – Stevie Wonder
- Trumpet and Strings – Al Hirt
- Twangy Guitar – Silky Strings – Duane Eddy
- Twist with Chubby Checker – Chubby Checker
- Twist with Keely Smith – Keely Smith
- Twistin' and Twangin' – Duane Eddy
- Twistin' Knights at the Roundtable – Bill Haley & His Comets
- Twistin' the Night Away – Sam Cooke
- Two of Us – Robert Goulet
- Vamp of the Roaring Twenties – Dorothy Provine
- The Vivacious One – Ann-Margret
- Warm and Willing – Andy Williams
- We Wish You a Merry Christmas – Ray Conniff
- West Side Story – Oscar Peterson Trio
- What Kind of Fool Am I and Other Show-Stoppers – Sammy Davis Jr.
- What Kind of Fool Am I? – Keely Smith
- Whispering Hope – Jo Stafford and Gordon MacRae
- You'll Never Walk Alone – Doris Day
- You're Mine You – Sarah Vaughan
- Young and Lively – Vic Damone

== Biggest hit singles ==
The following singles achieved the highest chart positions in 1962.

#	Artist	Title	Year	Country	Chart entries
1	Elvis Presley	Return to Sender	1962	US	UK 1 – Nov 1962, Canada 1 – Oct 1962, Norway 1 – Dec 1962, Éire 1 – Dec 1962, Peel list 1 of 1961, US BB 2 – Oct 1962, RYM 6 of 1962, US BB 8 of 1962, POP 8 of 1962, US CashBox 10 of 1963, Germany 15 – Jan 1963, DDD 27 of 1962, Scrobulate 83 of rock & roll, Acclaimed 2154
2	Ray Charles	I Can't Stop Loving You	1962	US	UK 1 – Jun 1962, US BB 1 – May 1962, Canada 1 – May 1962, Australia 1 for 1 weeks Dec 1961, Norway 4 – Jul 1962, US CashBox 6 of 1962, DDD 6 of 1962, Germany 8 – Sep 1962, South Africa 11 of 1962, RYM 16 of 1962, US BB 30 of 1962, POP 30 of 1962, Italy 75 of 1963, Scrobulate 80 of r & b, Rolling Stone 161, Acclaimed 507
3	The Tornados	Telstar	1962	UK	UK 1 – Aug 1962, US BB 1 – Nov 1962, Canada 1 – Nov 1962, Éire 1 – Nov 1962, South Africa 1 of 1962, RYM 2 of 1962, Norway 3 – Oct 1962, US CashBox 5 of 1963, Germany 6 – Jan 1963, Australia 8 of 1962, DDD 62 of 1962, Germany 224 of the 1960s, Acclaimed 739
4	Elvis Presley	Can't Help Falling in Love	1962	US	UK 1 – Feb 1962, Australia 1 for 4 weeks Aug 1961, US BB 2 – Dec 1961, US BB 4 of 1962, Canada 4 – Nov 1961, POP 4 of 1962, Australia 5 of 1962, South Africa 5 of 1962, RYM 11 of 1961, DDD 12 of 1961, US CashBox 28 of 1962, Party 33 of 2007, Scrobulate 64 of oldies, Italy 75 of 1962, Rolling Stone 394, WXPN 441, Acclaimed 1361
5	Elvis Presley	Good Luck Charm	1962	US	UK 1 – May 1962, US BB 1 – Mar 1962, Canada 1 – Mar 1962, Norway 1 – Apr 1962, Australia 1 for 3 weeks Oct 1961, Germany 6 – May 1962, US BB 10 of 1962, South Africa 13 of 1962, POP 17 of 1962, RYM 33 of 1962, US CashBox 42 of 1962, DDD 80 of 1962, Germany 203 of the 1960s

== Singles released ==
- "409" – The Beach Boys
- "A Forever Kind of Love" – Bobby Vee
- "A Little Love a Little Kiss" – Karl Denver
- "A Picture of You" – Joe Brown
- "Adios Amigo" – Jim Reeves
- "Ain't That Funny" – Jimmy Justice
- "Al di là" – Emilio Pericoli
- "All Alone Am I" – Brenda Lee
- "Always You and Me" – Russ Conway
- "Another Day, Another Dollar" – Wynn Stewart
- "As You Like It" – Adam Faith
- "Ave Maria" – Shirley Bassey
- "Baby Face" – Bobby Darin
- "Baby Take a Bow" – Adam Faith
- "The Ballad of Paladin" – Duane Eddy
- "Because of Love" – Billy Fury
- "Bermuda" – Linda Scott
- "Bésame Mucho" – Jet Harris
- "Big Girls Don't Cry" – The Four Seasons
- "Big Man in a Big House" – Leroy Van Dyke
- "Blue Weekend" – Karl Denver
- "Bobby's Girl", recorded by
  - Marcie Blane
  - Susan Maughan
- "Breaking Up Is Hard to Do" – Neil Sedaka
- "Break It to Me Gently" – Brenda Lee
- "Can't Help Falling in Love/Rock-A-Hula Baby" – Elvis Presley
- "Chip Chip" – Gene McDaniels
- "Cindy's Birthday" – Shane Fenton and the Fentones
- "Close To Cathy" – Mike Clifford
- "Clown Shoes" – Johnny Burnette
- "The Comancheros" – Lonnie Donegan
- "Come Along Please" – Bob Wallis and His Storyville Jazzmen
- "Come Outside" – Mike Sarne with Wendy Richard
- "Conscience" – James Darren
- "Count Every Star" – Linda Scott
- "The Crowd" – Roy Orbison
- "Cry Myself to Sleep" – Del Shannon
- "Crying in the Rain" – Everly Brothers
- "Cutty Sark" – John Barry Seven
- "D-Darling" – Anthony Newley
- "Dance On! – The Shadows
- "(Dance with the) Guitar Man" – Duane Eddy
- "Dancin' Party" – Chubby Checker
- "Dear Lady Twist" – Gary U.S. Bonds
- "Dear One" – Larry Finnegan
- "Deep in the Heart of Texas" – Duane Eddy
- "Desafinado" – Ella Fitzgerald
  - Stan Getz and Charlie Byrd
- "Devil Woman" – Marty Robbins
- "Don't Break the Heart That Loves You" – Connie Francis
- "Don't Ever Change" – The Crickets
- "Don't Stop Twist" – Frankie Vaughan
- "Don't That Beat All" – Adam Faith
- "Don't You Believe It" – Andy Williams
- "Dream Baby (How Long Must I Dream)" – Roy Orbison
- "Drummin' up a Storm" – Sandy Nelson
- "Drums Are My Beat" – Sandy Nelson
- "Duke of Earl" – Gene Chandler
- "End of the World" – Skeeter Davis
- "English Country Garden" – Jimmie Rodgers
- "Ever Since You Said You Goodbye" – Marty Wilde
- "Everybody Loves Me But You" – Brenda Lee
- "Everybody's Twistin'" – Frank Sinatra
- "Fanlight Fanny" – Clinton Ford
- "Far Away" – Shirley Bassey
- "Follow That Dream (EP)" – Elvis Presley
- "Forget Me Not" – Eden Kane
- "Funny Way of Laughin'" – Burl Ives
- "Gina" – Johnny Mathis
- "Ginny Come Lately" – Brian Hyland
- "Go Away Little Girl", recorded by:
  - Steve Lawrence
  - Del Shannon
- "Good Luck Charm" – Elvis Presley
- "Goodbye Cruel World" – James Darren
- "Gossip Calypso" – Bernard Cribbins
- "Gotta See Baby Tonight" – Acker Bilk
- "Green Leaves of Summer" – Kenny Ball and his Jazzmen
- "Green Onions" – Booker T. & the M.G.s
- "Guitar Tango" – The Shadows
- "Half Heaven – Half Heartache" – Gene Pitney
- "Heart in Hand" – Brenda Lee
- "He Got What He Wanted" – Little Richard
- "He's a Rebel" – The Crystals
- "Her Royal Majesty" – James Darren
- "Here Comes That Feeling" – Brenda Lee
- "Hey! Baby" – Bruce Channel
- "Hey Little Girl" – Del Shannon
- "The Hole in the Ground" – Bernard Cribbins
- "How Can I Meet Her?" – The Everly Brothers
- "I Can't Stop Loving You" – Ray Charles
- "I Don't Know Why" – Eden Kane
- "I Love You" – The Volumes
- "I Remember You" – Frank Ifield
- "I Was Such a Fool (To Fall in Love with You)" - Connie Francis
- "I'll See You in My Dreams" – Pat Boone
- "I'm Blue (The Gong-Gong Song)" – The Ikettes
- "I'm Counting on You" – Petula Clark
- "I'm Going Back to School" - Dee Clark
- "I'm Just a Baby" – Louise Cordet
- "I'm Lookin' Out the Window"/"Do You Want to Dance" – Cliff Richard/Cliff Richard and The Shadows
- "I'm the Girl on Wolverton Mountain" – Jo Ann Campbell
- "If a Man Answers" – Bobby Darin
- "If I Had a Hammer – Peter, Paul and Mary
- "If Only Tomorrow" – Ronnie Carroll
- "Island of Dreams" – Springfields
- "It Keeps Right on a Hurtin'" – Johnny Tillotson
- "It Might as Well Rain Until September" – Carole King
- "It Only Took a Minute" – Joe Brown
- "It Started All Over Again" – Brenda Lee
- "It'll Be Me" – Cliff Richard and The Shadows
- "It's a Raggy Waltz" – Dave Brubeck
- "It's All Over Now" – Shane Fenton and the Fentones
- "James Bond Theme" – John Barry Orchestra
- "Jeannie" – Danny Williams
- "Jezebel" – Marty Wilde
- "Johnny Angel", recorded by:
  - Shelley Fabares
  - Patti Lynn
- "Johnny Get Angry" – Joanie Sommers
- "King Kong" – Terry Lightfoot and His New Orleans Jazzmen
- "King of Clowns" – Neil Sedaka
- "Lana" – The Velvets
- "The Language of Love" – John D. Loudermilk
- "Last Night Was Made for Love" – Billy Fury
- "Lemon Tree – Peter, Paul and Mary
- "Lesson One" – Russ Conway
- "Lessons in Love" – Allisons
- "Let's Dance" – Chris Montez
- "Let's Go (Pony)" – The Routers
- "Let's Talk about Love" – Helen Shapiro
- "Letter Full of Tears" – Billy Fury
- "Let There Be Love" – Nat King Cole and George Shearing
- "(The Man Who Shot) Liberty Valance"- Gene Pitney
- "Like I Do" – Maureen Evans
- "Limbo Rock" – Chubby Checker
- "A Little Bitty Tear" – Burl Ives and Miki & Griff
- "Little Black Book" – Jimmy Dean
- "Little Diane" – Dion
- "Little Miss Lonely" – Helen Shapiro
- "Little Red Rented Rowboat" – Joe Dowell
- "The Loco-Motion" – Little Eva
- "Lone Rider" – John Leyton
- "Lonely City" – John Leyton
- "Lonesome" – Adam Faith
- "Lonely" – Acker Bilk
- "Love and Fury" – The Tornados
- "Love Came to Me" – Dion
- "Love Me Warm and Tender" – Paul Anka
- "Love Letters" – Ketty Lester
- "Love Me Do" – The Beatles
- "Love Me Tender" – Richard Chamberlain
- "Lover Please", recorded by:
  - Clyde McPhatter
  - The Vernons Girls
- "Lovers Who Wander" – Dion
- "Lovesick Blues" – Frank Ifield
- "Luigi Tenco" – Luigi Tenco
- "Made to Love (Girls Girls Girls)" – Eddie Hodges
- "The Main Attraction" – Pat Boone
- "Main Title Theme from The Man with the Golden Arm" – Jet Harris
- "Mashed Potato Time" – Dee Dee Sharp
- "March of the Siamese Children" – Kenny Ball and his Jazzmen
- "Me and My Shadow" – Frank Sinatra and Sammy Davis Jr.
- "Must Be Madison" – Joe Loss Orchestra
- "My Love and Devotion" – Matt Monro
- "Never Goodbye" – Karl Denver
- "Next Door to an Angel" – Neil Sedaka
- "The Next Time"/"Bachelor Boy" – Cliff Richard and The Shadows
- "No One Can Make My Sunshine Smile" – The Everly Brothers
- "Norman" – Sue Thompson
- "Nut Rocker" – B. Bumble and the Stingers
- "Oh Lonesome Me" – Craig Douglas
- "Old Rivers" – Walter Brennan
- "Once Upon a Dream" – Billy Fury
- "Onward Christian Soldiers" – Harry Simeone Chorale
- "Orange Blossom Special" – The Spotnicks
- "Our Favourite Melodies" – Craig Douglas
- "Palisades Park" – Freddy Cannon
- "Party Lights" – Claudine Clark
- "The Party's Over" – Lonnie Donegan
- "Patches" – Dickey Lee
- "The Pay Off" – Kenny Ball and his Jazzmen
- "Peppermint Twist" – Joey Dee and the Starliters
- "Pianissimo" – Ken Dodd
- "Pick a Bale of Cotton" – Lonnie Donegan
- "Please Don't Ask About Barbara" – Bobby Vee
- "Popeye the Hitchhiker" - Chubby Checker
- "P.S. I Love You" – The Beatles
- "Puff" – Kenny Lynch
- "Punish Her" – Bobby Vee
- "Pushover"- Etta James
- "Ramblin' Rose" – Nat King Cole
- "Reminiscing" – Buddy Holly
- "Return To Sender" – Elvis Presley
- "Ride!" – Dee Dee Sharp
- "Right Said Fred" – Bernard Cribbins
- "Rinky Dink" – Dave "Baby" Cortez
- "Rocket Man" – The Spotnicks
- "Rockin' Around the Christmas Tree" – Brenda Lee
- "Roses Are Red (My Love)", recorded by:
  - Ronnie Carroll
  - Bobby Vinton
- "Rumors" – Johnny Crawford
- "Sealed with a Kiss" – Brian Hyland
- "Send Me the Pillow You Dream On" – Johnny Tillotson
- "Sharing You" – Bobby Vee
- "She's Got You" – Patsy Cline
- "She's Not You" – Elvis Presley
- "Sheila" – Tommy Roe
- "Sherry" – The Four Seasons
- "Shout! Shout! (Knock Yourself Out)" – Ernie Maresca
- "Slow Twistin'" – Chubby Checker
- "Smoky Places" – The Corsairs
- "So Do I" – Kenny Ball and his Jazzmen
- "So This Is Love" – The Castells
- "Softly, as I Leave You" – Matt Monro
- "Soldier Boy" – Shirelles
- "Some People" – Carol Deene
- "Son This Is She" – John Leyton
- "Spanish Harlem" – Jimmy Justice
- "Speak to Me Pretty" – Brenda Lee
- "Speedy Gonzales" – Pat Boone
- "Stranger on the Shore", recorded by:
  - Acker Bilk
  - Andy Williams
- "Sun Arise" – Rolf Harris
- "Surfer's Stomp" – The Marketts
- "Surfin' Safari" – The Beach Boys
- "Susie Darlin'" – Tommy Roe
- "Sweet Little Sixteen" – Jerry Lee Lewis
- "Swinging in the Rain" – Norman Vaughan
- "The Swiss Maid" – Del Shannon
- "Monster Mash" – Bobby "Boris" Pickett
- "Tears" – Danny Williams
- "Teen Age Idol" – Rick Nelson
- "Tell Me What He Said" – Helen Shapiro
- "Telstar – The Tornados
- "Ten Little Indians" – The Beach Boys
- "That Noise" – Anthony Newley
- "That Stranger Used To Be My Girl" – Trade Martin
- "Theme from Dr. Kildare (Three Stars Will Shine Tonight)" – Richard Chamberlain
- "Theme from Maigret" – Joe Loss
- "Theme from Z-Cars", recorded by:
  - Johnny Keating
  - Norrie Paramor and His Orchestra
- "Things" – Bobby Darin
- "Tonight" – Shirley Bassey
- "Torture" – Kris Jensen
- "Town Without Pity" – Gene Pitney
- "Tuff" – Ace Cannon
- "The Twist" – Chubby Checker
- "Twist, Twist Senora" – Gary U.S. Bonds
- "Twistin' the Night Away" – Sam Cooke
- "Unsquare Dance" – Dave Brubeck
- "Up on the Roof" – Kenny Lynch
- "Vacation" – Connie Francis
- "Venus in Blue Jeans" – Mark Wynter
- "Village Of Love" – Nathaniel Mayer and The Fabulous Twilights
- "The Wah-Watusi" – The Orlons
- "Walk Away" – Shane Fenton and the Fentones
- "Walk On By" – Leroy Van Dyke
- "Walk Right In" – The Rooftop Singers
- "The Wanderer" – Dion
- "Warmed Over Kisses" – Brian Hyland
- "We're Gonna Go Fishin'" – Hank Locklin
- "Welcome Home Baby" – The Brook Brothers
- "Welcome Home, Baby" – The Shirelles
- "What A Crazy World We're Living In" – Joe Brown
- "What Kind of Fool Am I?/Gonna Build A Mountain" – Sammy Davis Jr.
- "What Now My Love" – Shirley Bassey
- "What's Your Name" – Don and Juan
- "When My Little Girl Is Smiling", recorded by:
  - Craig Douglas
  - The Drifters
  - Jimmy Justice
- "Wiggle Wobble" – Les Cooper & the Soul Rockers
- "Will I What" – Mike Sarne
- "Wimoweh" – Karl Denver
- "Wonderful Land" – The Shadows
- "Wonderful World of the Young" – Danny Williams
- "Ya Ya Twist" – Petula Clark
- "Yes, My Darling Daughter" – Eydie Gorme
- "You Are Mine" – Frankie Avalon
- "You Don't Know Me" – Ray Charles
- "You'll Lose a Good Thing" – Barbara Lynn
- "The Young Ones" – Cliff Richard and The Shadows
- "Young World" – Ricky Nelson
- "Your Cheatin' Heart" – Ray Charles
- "Your Ma Said You Cried in Your Sleep Last Night" – Doug Sheldon
- "Your Tender Look" – Joe Brown

== Published popular music ==
- "Soul Bossa Nova" w.m. Quincy Jones
- "Ahab the Arab" w.m. Ray Stevens
- "Blowin' in the Wind" w.m. Bob Dylan
- "Bossa Nova Baby" w.m. Jerry Leiber & Mike Stoller
- "The Boys' Night Out" w. Sammy Cahn m. Jimmy Van Heusen from the film Boys' Night Out
- "Breaking Up Is Hard To Do" w.m. Neil Sedaka & Howard Greenfield
- "Call Me Irresponsible" w. Sammy Cahn m. Jimmy Van Heusen from the film Papa's Delicate Condition
- "Can't Get Used to Losing You" w.m. Doc Pomus & Mort Shuman
- "Can't Help Falling in Love" w.m. Luigi Creatore, Hugo Peretti & George David Weiss
- "Comedy Tonight" w.m. Stephen Sondheim
- "Danke Schoen" w. Milton Gabler & Kurt Schwabach m. Bert Kaempfert
- "Days of Wine and Roses" w. Johnny Mercer m. Henry Mancini from the film Days of Wine and Roses
- "Desafinado" w. Newton Mendonca m. Antonio Carlos Jobim
- "Devil Woman" w.m. Marty Robbins
- "Don't Make Me Over" w. Hal David m. Burt Bacharach
- "Dream Baby" w.m. Cindy Walker
- "Free" w.m. Stephen Sondheim
- "Go Away, Little Girl" w.m. Gerry Goffin & Carole King
- "Gonna Build A Mountain" w.m. Leslie Bricusse & Anthony Newley from the musical Stop The World – I Want To Get Off
- "The Good Life" w. (Fr) Jean Broussolle (as "La Belle Vie") (Eng) Jack Reardon w. Sacha Distel
- "Have A Dream" w.Lee Adams m. Charles Strouse
- "He's a Rebel" w.m. Gene Pitney
- "Her Royal Majesty" w.m. Gerry Goffin & Carole King
- "I Just Don't Know What to Do with Myself" w. Hal David m. Burt Bacharach
- "I'm Calm" w.m. Stephen Sondheim
- "I'm Not The Marrying Kind" w. Mack David m. Sherman Edwards
- "I've Got Your Number" w. Carolyn Leigh m. Cy Coleman. Introduced in the musical Little Me by Swen Swenson and Virginia Martin.
- "Impossible" w.m. Stephen Sondheim
- "It's The Only Way To Travel" w. Sammy Cahn m. Jimmy Van Heusen. Introduced by Bing Crosby and Bob Hope in the film The Road to Hong Kong
- "Johnny Get Angry" w. Hal David m. Sherman Edwards
- "Let's Not Be Sensible" w. Sammy Cahn m. Jimmy Van Heusen. Introduced by Bing Crosby and Dorothy Lamour in the film The Road to Hong Kong
- "Little Boxes" w.m. Malvina Reynolds
- "Loads of Love" w.m. Richard Rodgers. Introduced by Diahann Carroll in the musical No Strings
- "Look No Further" w.m. Richard Rodgers. Introduced by Diahann Carroll and Richard Kiley in the musical No Strings
- "Love I Hear" w.m. Stephen Sondheim
- "Lovely" w.m. Stephen Sondheim
- "Make It Easy On Yourself" w. Hal David m. Burt Bacharach
- "The Man Who Shot Liberty Valance" w. Hal David m. Burt Bacharach
- "More" w. Marcello Ciorciolini & Norman Newell m. Nino Oliviero & Riz Ortolani from the film Mondo Cane
- "On The Other Side Of The Tracks" w. Carolyn Leigh m. Cy Coleman from the musical Little Me
- "Once in a Lifetime" w.m. Leslie Bricusse & Anthony Newley from the musical Stop the World – I Want to Get Off
- "Once Upon a Time" w. Lee Adams m. Charles Strouse. Introduced by Ray Bolger and Eileen Herlie in the musical All American
- "One Note Samba" w. Jon Hendricks & Newton Mendonca m. Antonio Carlos Jobim
- "Only Love Can Break a Heart" w. Hal David m. Burt Bacharach
- "Patches" w.and m Barry Mann and Larry Kolber
- "Pretty Little Picture" w.m. Stephen Sondheim
- "Quando, quando, quando" w. Pat Boone & Alberto Testa m. Elio Cesari
- "Ramblin' Rose" w.m. Noel Sherman & Joe Sherman
- "Real Live Girl" w. Carolyn Leigh m. Cy Coleman. Introduced by Sid Caesar in the musical Little Me.
- "The Road to Hong Kong" w. Sammy Cahn m. Jimmy Van Heusen from the film The Road to Hong Kong
- "The Stripper" m. David Rose
- "The Sweetest Sounds" w.m. Richard Rodgers from the musical No Strings
- "A Swingin' Safari" m. Bert Kaempfert
- "Teamwork" w. Sammy Cahn m. Jimmy Van Heusen. Introduced by Bing Crosby, Bob Hope and Joan Collins in the film The Road to Hong Kong
- "Those Lazy-Hazy-Crazy Days of Summer" w. Charles Tobias m. Hans Carste
- "Vacation" w.m. Connie Francis, Hank Hunter & Gary Weston
- "A Walk in the Black Forest" m. Horst Jankowski
- "Walk on the Wild Side" w. Mack David m. Elmer Bernstein from the film Walk on the Wild Side
- "Warmer Than a Whisper" w. Sammy Cahn m. Jimmy Van Heusen. Introduced by Dorothy Lamour in the film The Road to Hong Kong
- "What Kind of Fool Am I?" w.m. Leslie Bricusse & Anthony Newley. Introduced by Anthony Newley in the musical Stop The World – I Want To Get Off
- "What Now, My Love?" w. Pierre Delanoë & Carl Sigman m. Gilbert Bécaud
- "Wolverton Mountain" w.m. Merle Kilgore & Claude King

== Other notable songs ==
- "Danke Schoen" w. Kurt Schwaback and Milt Gabler m. Bert Kaempfert
- "The Girl from Ipanema" ("Garota de Ipanema") w. Vinicius de Moraes m. Antonio Carlos Jobim
- "Quando, quando, quando" w. Alberto Testa m. Tony Renis
- "Mandulinata blu" – Mario Trevi
- "Zwei kleine Italiener" w. George Buschor m. Christian Bruhn

== Classical music ==
=== Premieres ===
Composer	Composition	Date	Location	Performers
Cage, John	27′ 10.554” for a percussionist	1962-02-02	Munich, Germany	Rockstroh
Stockhausen, Karlheinz	Momente, first version	1962-05-21	Cologne, Germany (WDR, Musik der Zeit)	Arroyo, WDR Symphony Orchestra and Chorus, Aloys and Alfons Kontarsky, Stockhausen.
Britten, Benjamin	War Requiem, Op. 65	1962-05-30	Coventry, UK (Coventry Cathedral)	Harper, Pears, Fischer-Dieskau, CBSO, Melos Ensemble, Davies, Britten
Stockhausen, Karlheinz	Klavierstück X	1962-10-10	Palermo, Italy (Terzo Settimano Internazionale Nuova Musica)	Rzewski

=== Compositions ===
- George Barati – Chamber Concerto
- Carlos Chávez – Symphony No. 6
- Aaron Copland – Connotations
- George Crumb – Five Pieces for piano
- Luigi Dallapiccola
  - Three Questions With Two Answers for orchestra
  - Preghiere for baritone and chamber orchestra
- Mario Davidovsky
  - Electronic Study No. 2
  - Synchronisms No. 1 for flute and electronic sound
  - Trio for Clarinet, Trumpet, and Viola
- Ding Shande – Long March Symphony
- Paavo Heininen – Second Symphony ("Petite symphonie joyeuse")
- György Ligeti – Poème symphonique
- Francis Jackson – Intrada for organ, Op. 84 No. 6
- André Jolivet – Concerto for cello n°1
- Wojciech Kilar – Riff 62 for symphony orchestra
- Darius Milhaud
  - A Frenchman in New York
  - Invocation à l'ange Raphael
  - Overture Philharmonique
  - Symphony No. 12 Rurale
- Krzysztof Penderecki – Stabat Mater
- Francis Poulenc
  - Sonata for Oboe
  - Sonata for Clarinet
- William Schuman – Symphony No. 8
- Dmitri Shostakovich – Symphony No. 13 in B-flat minor, Op. 113 "Babi-Yar"
- Ezra Sims – Third Quartet
- La Monte Young – The Second Dream of the High-Tension Line Stepdown Transformer

== Opera ==
- Mozart Camargo Guarnieri – Um homem só (tragic opera in one act, libretto by Gianfrancesco Guarnieri, premiered on November 29 at the Theatro Municipal in Rio de Janeiro)
- Mario Castelnuovo-Tedesco – The Importance of Being Earnest
- Carlisle Floyd – The Passion of Jonathan Wade
- Michael Tippett – King Priam
- Bruno Maderna – Don Perlimplin (ovvero il Trionfo dell'amore e dell'immaginazione)

== Film ==
- David Amram - The Manchurian Candidate
- Elmer Bernstein - To Kill a Mockingbird
- Georges Delerue - Jules and Jim
- Jerry Goldsmith - Freud
- Bernard Herrmann - Cape Fear
- Maurice Jarre - Lawrence of Arabia
- Bronislau Kaper - Mutiny on the Bounty
- Krzysztof Komeda - Knife in the Water
- Henry Mancini - Days of Wine and Roses
- Henry Mancini - Experiment in Terror
- Henry Mancini - Hatari!
- Alfred Newman - How the West Was Won
- Monty Norman - Dr. No
- Franz Waxman - Taras Bulba

== Musical theatre ==
- All-American Broadway production opened at the Winter Garden Theatre and ran for 80 performances
- Blitz! (Lionel Bart) – London production
- A Funny Thing Happened on the Way to the Forum (Stephen Sondheim) – Broadway production opened at the Alvin Theatre and ran for 964 performances
- Gentlemen Prefer Blondes London production
- The Golden Apple Off-Broadway revival of 1954 Broadway production
- I Can Get It for You Wholesale Broadway production opened at the Shubert Theatre and ran for 300 performances
- Little Mary Sunshine London production
- Little Me Broadway production opened at the Lunt-Fontanne Theatre on November 17 and ran for 257 performances
- No Strings Broadway production opened at the 54th Street Theater on March 15 and ran for 580 performances
- Stop the World – I Want to Get Off (Anthony Newley and Leslie Bricusse) – Broadway production

== Musical films ==
- Bees Saal Baad, starring Biswajeet
- Billy Rose's Jumbo released December 6 starring Doris Day, Jimmy Durante, Stephen Boyd and Martha Raye
- Gypsy starring Rosalind Russell, Natalie Wood and Karl Malden. Directed by Mervyn LeRoy.
- Girls! Girls! Girls! starring Elvis Presley
- The Music Man starring Robert Preston, Shirley Jones and Hermione Gingold. Directed by Morton DaCosta.
- The Road to Hong Kong
- State Fair
- Wild Guitar

== Births ==
- January 2 - Sister Nancy, Jamaican dancehall DJ, and singer
- January 4
  - Robin Guthrie (The Cocteau Twins)
  - Peter Steele (Type O Negative)
- January 8 – Chris Marion, American musician (Little River Band)
- January 13 – Trace Adkins, American country music singer-songwriter
- January 15 – Tony Rebel, reggae/dancehall artist
- January 16
  - Paul Webb (Talk Talk)
  - Maxine Jones, American singer, songwriter, actress and businesswoman (En Vogue)
- January 19 – Sandeé, American singer (Exposé) (d. 2008)
- January 22 – Jimmy Herring, American guitarist
- January 28 – Leslie Phillips/Sam Phillips, singer
- January 31 – Sophie Muller, British music video director
- February 1 – Tomoyasu Hotei, Japanese guitarist (Boøwy)
- February 4 – Clint Black, American singer-songwriter, guitarist and producer
- February 5 – Martin Nievera, Filipino singer and TV personality
- February 6 – Axl Rose (Guns N' Roses, LA Guns, AC/DC)
- February 7
  - David Bryan, keyboardist for the band Bon Jovi
  - Garth Brooks, country singer
- February 10 – Cliff Burton, bassist for Metallica (died 1986)
- February 11 – Sheryl Crow, American singer
- February 15 – Carol Rich, Swiss singer
- February 17 – David McComb, Australian singer-songwriter and guitarist (The Triffids and The Blackeyed Susans) (died 1999)
- February 19 – Francisco Alejandro Gutierrez, singer
- February 21 – Mark Arm, born Mark McLaughlin, American grunge vocalist (Mudhoney)
- February 22
  - Olivier Latry, French organist
  - Michael Wilton, American progressive metal guitarist Queensrÿche
- February 24 – Michelle Shocked, American musician
- February 26 – Gerry Leonard, Irish guitarist and singer
- March 2
  - Jon Bon Jovi, lead singer for the band Bon Jovi
  - Scott La Rock, American DJ and producer (Boogie Down Productions) (d. 1987)
- March 5
  - Craig Reid and Charlie Reid, The Proclaimers
  - Amina Annabi, French-Tunisian singer-songwriter and actress
- March 7 – Taylor Dayne, American singer
- March 10 – Gary Clark (musician), Scottish singer-songwriter, music producer (The Veronicas, Delta Goodrem, Reece Mastin, Gin Wigmore)
- March 15 – Terence Trent D'Arby, American-born English singer
- March 17 – Clare Grogan, Scottish actress and singer
- March 21 – Rosie O'Donnell, American comedian and actress
- March 24
  - Angèle Dubeau, Canadian violinist
  - Renee Rosnes, Canadian jazz pianist/composer
  - Rita, Israeli pop singer and actress
- March 29 – Dan Bittman, Romanian singer
- March 30 – M.C. Hammer, American rapper
- March 31 – Phil Leadbetter, American musician (died 2021)
- April 3 – Mike Ness (Social Distortion)
- April 8 – Izzy Stradlin, American guitarist (Guns N' Roses, Ju Ju Hounds)
- April 12
  - Art Alexakis, American singer and musician (Everclear)
  - Michael English, American Christian singer
- April 13
  - Hillel Slovak, American rock musician (Red Hot Chili Peppers) (died 1988)
  - Lane McCray, German group (La Bouche)
- April 16 – Ian MacKaye, American musician (Minor Threat, Fugazi)
- April 17 – Niki Haris, American singer and dancer (Snap!)
- April 18 – Min Hae-kyung, South Korean singer
- May 2 — Alain Johannes, American musician and producer (Eleven (band), Queens of the Stone Age, Them Crooked Vultures)
- May 9 – Dave Gahan, English singer (Depeche Mode)
- May 12 – Brett Gurewitz (Bad Religion)
- May 14
  - Ian Astbury, British rock singer (The Cult)
  - C.C. DeVille, American rock guitarist (Poison)
- May 16 – Erwin Gutawa, Indonesian composer
- May 18 – Sandra, German singer
- May 28 – Brandon Cruz, American child actor and musician
- May 30 – Choi Min-sik, South Korean actor
- May 31 – Corey Hart
- June 8
  - Nick Rhodes (Duran Duran)
  - Kristine W, American singer
- June 10 – Wong Ka Kui, Hong Kong composer, songwriter, musician and singer (died 1993)
- June 15 – Andrea Rost, Hungarian lyric soprano
- June 16 – Femi Kuti, Nigerian saxophonist
- June 17 – Lio, Belgian singer and actress
- June 19 – Paula Abdul, American pop vocalist
- June 20 – Mark De Gli Antoni, Soul Coughing
- June 21 – Viktor Tsoi, Soviet underground singer and songwriter (died 1990)
- June 22 – Bobby Gillespie, Scottish musician (Primal Scream)
- June 23
  - Chuck Billy, American singer-songwriter and guitarist (Testament and Dublin Death Patrol)
  - Steve Shelley, American musician (Sonic Youth and Crucifucks)
- June 26 – Andrej Šeban, guitarist
- June 27 – Michael Ball, British stage actor and singer
- July 3
  - Brian Canham, Australian rock singer (Pseudo Echo)
  - Tom Cruise, American actor and film producer
- July 7 – Mark White, bassist (Spin Doctors)
- July 8 – Joan Osborne, American singer
- July 11 – Muriel Dacq, Belgian singer and songwriter
- July 13 – Rhonda Vincent, American singer-songwriter and mandolin player
- July 18 – Jack Irons, American drummer (Red Hot Chili Peppers, Pearl Jam)
- July 21 – Lee Aaron, Canadian rock and jazz singer
- July 22
  - Steve Albini, guitarist
  - Martine St. Clair, Canadian singer and actress
- July 26 – Mairéad Ní Mhaonaigh, Irish musician
- July 27 – Karl Mueller (Soul Asylum) (died 2005)
- July 29 – Lisa Ono, Japanese-Brazilian bossa nova singer
- August 2 – Lee Mavers, English musician (The La's)
- August 4 – Paul Reynolds (A Flock of Seagulls)
- August 17 – Gilby Clarke, American rock musician (Guns N' Roses)
- August 25 – Vivian Campbell, rock guitarist (Def Leppard)
- September 9 – Kaija Kärkinen, Finnish singer and actress
- September 12 – Dino Merlin, Bosnian singer-songwriter
- September 18 – Joanne Catherall, English synth-pop singer (The Human League)
- September 20 – Fionnuala Sherry, Irish violinist (Secret Garden)
- September 22 – Alejandro Abad, Chilean-Spanish singer
- September 26 – Tracey Thorn, English singer, songwriter and writer
- September 27 – Glenn Jones, American R&B and soul singer
- October 2 – Bebi Dol, Serbian singer
- October 3 – Tommy Lee, drummer (Mötley Crüe)
- October 5 – Ken Noda, concert pianist and composer
- October 12 – Chris Botti, jazz trumpeter
- October 15 – Mark Reznicek, alternative rock drummer (Toadies)
- October 16
  - Flea, American-Australian actor and rock bassist (Red Hot Chili Peppers)
  - Dmitri Hvorostovsky, operatic baritone (died 2017)
- October 25 – Chad Smith, American rock drummer (Red Hot Chili Peppers)
- November 1
  - Magne Furuholmen, Norwegian rock keyboardist (a-ha)
  - Anthony Kiedis, American rock singer (Red Hot Chili Peppers)
- November 2
  - Ron McGovney, American rock bassist (Metallica)
  - Graham Waterhouse, English composer
- November 3
  - Marilyn, born Peter Robinson, pop vocalist
  - Geir Rönning, Finnish singer-songwriter
  - Donna Richardson, American personal trainer and author
- November 9 – Steve "Silk" Hurley, house-music producer and club DJ
- November 11
  - Mic Michaeli, Swedish rock keyboardist (Europe)
  - James Morrison, Australian musician
- November 12 – Brix Smith, American singer and guitarist (The Fall and The Adult Net)
- November 16 – Carles Magraner, Spanish musician and teacher
- November 18 – Kirk Hammett, American rock guitarist (Metallica)
- November 20
  - Peng Liyuan, Chinese folk singer and First Lady
  - Gail Ann Dorsey, American musician and singer
- November 21 – Steven Curtis Chapman, American Christian music singer-songwriter
- November 27
  - Charlie Benante, American drummer (Anthrax)
  - Mike Bordin (Faith No More)
- November 28 – Matt Cameron (Soundgarden, Pearl Jam)
- December 4 – Vinnie Dombroski (Sponge)
- December 5 – José Cura, Argentine tenor
- December 6 - Ben Watt, British musician, singer, songwriter, author, DJ and radio presenter, best known as one half of the duo Everything but the Girl and Tracy Thorn
- December 8 – Marty Friedman (Megadeth)
- December 23 – Sass Jordan, Canadian singer, actress and television personality
- December 25 – Francis Dunnery, English musician, singer-songwriter (It Bites)
- December 28 – Michel Petrucciani, French musician (died 1999)
- December 31 – Jennifer Higdon, American composer
- December 31 - Heather McCartney, American potter and artist daughter of Paul McCartney and Linda McCartney
- Unknown date? – Mark Adamo, American composer

== Deaths ==
- January 29 – Fritz Kreisler, violinist, 86
- February 5 – Jacques Ibert, composer, 71
- February 7 – Roy Atwell, American actor, comedian and composer, 83
- February 17 – Bruno Walter, conductor, 85
- February 22 – Attila the Hun, calypso singer, 69
- March 24 – Jean Goldkette, jazz musician, 69
- April 10 – Stuart Sutcliffe, early member of The Beatles, 21
- May 20 – Anna Báthy, Hungarian soprano
- May 24 – Cloe Elmo, operatic contralto, 52
- May 27 – Egon Petri, pianist, 81
- June 12 – John Ireland, pianist and composer, 82
- June 13 – Sir Eugene Aynsley Goossens, conductor, 69
- June 15 – Alfred Cortot, pianist and conductor, 84
- July 11 – René Maison, operatic tenor, 66
- July 12 – Roger Wolfe Kahn, bandleader, 54 (heart attack)
- July 25 – Christie MacDonald, actress and singer, 87
- August 5 - Marilyn Monroe, Actress and Singer, 36
- August 19 – Emilius Bangert, composer and organist, 79
- September 6
  - Hanns Eisler, composer, 64
  - Dermot Troy, lyric tenor, 35 (heart attack)
- October 6 – Solomon Linda, Zulu musician, 53
- October 15 – Joseph Noyon, French organist and composer, 74
- November 15 – Toscha Seidel, violinist, 62
- November 18 – Steffy Goldner, harpist, 66
- November 19 – Clara Clemens, concert contralto, daughter of Mark Twain, 88
- December 7 – Kirsten Flagstad, operatic soprano, 67
- December 12 – Ilona Steingruber, Austrian soprano, 50
- December 13 – Harry Barris, singer, composer and pianist, 57 (alcohol-related)
- December 22 – Roy Palmer, jazz trombonist, 70
- December 31 – Bella Alten, operatic soprano, 85
- date unknown – Palladam Sanjiva Rao, flautist and Carnatic musician

== Awards ==
=== Eurovision Song Contest ===
- Eurovision Song Contest 1962: Un premier amour, sung by Isabelle Aubret for France (music by Claude-Henri Vic, text by Roland Stephane Valade)

=== Grammy Awards ===
- Grammy Awards of 1962

=== Ivor Novello Awards ===
- Best-Selling A-Side – The Tornados, "Telstar"
- Tony Osborne

== See also ==
- List of Billboard Hot 100 number-one singles of 1962
