= List of songs written by Jack Keller =

This is a list of songs written by Jack Keller. Keller (1936–2005) was an American songwriter whose work spans six decades.

Song	Performing Artist	Co-Writer(s)	Year	Notes
(Angie, Love Me) Make The Hurt Go Away	Fountain of Youth	Diane Hildebrand		
(Let The Lovelight In Your Eyes) Lead Me On	Steve & Eydie, Petula Clark, Sacha Distel, Tennessee Ernie Ford, Vernons	Ernie Sheldon	1971	
(Let's Have a) Private Party	Barry Mann	Joe Shapiro		
(Little Darlin') Take A Bow	Four Coins	Brooks Arthur	1963	
(One Of These Days) Sunday's Gonna Come On Tuesday	The New Establishment	Ernie Sheldon	1969	Billboard #92
(Wait Till You See) My Gidget	Johnny Tillotson, Billy Carr	Howard Greenfield	1965	(aka “Gidget”)
A Face In The Crowd	Kenny Karen	Gerry Goffin		
A Heart Is a Terrible Thing To Waste		Cyndea Wendell, John Wendell	1994	
A Forever Kind of Love	Bobby Vee, Cliff Richard, Darryl Ford, Mike Redway, Azie Mortimer	Gerry Goffin	1962	
A Love To Last a Lifetime	Barry Mann	Noel Sherman	1959	
A Man's Not Supposed To Cry		Gerry Goffin		
A Most Impossible Dream	Dwayne Hickman, Barry Mann	Hank Hunter		
A Woman Is A Sentimental Thing	Paul Anka	Howard Greenfield	1967	
Ain't It Funny What Some Lovin' Can Do	Quiet Five	Tony Powers	1966	
Ain't No Way To Forget The Fire		Jay Booker		
All The Grey Haired Men	The Lettermen, the Monkees (incomplete recording, backing track only)	Bob Russell	1968	
Alguém é bobo de alguém	Zezinha	Howard Greenfield	1961	Portuguese (Brazilian) "Everybody's Somebody's Fool"
And Now		Larry Kolber, Tony Powers		
Anyone Else	Bobby Vee, Gene McDaniels	Brooks Arthur	1963	
Apple Bend	Johnny Tillotson, Marty Kaniger	Diane Hildebrand	1971	
Aqui Se Hable En Amor		Noel Sherman		aka Love Is Spoken Here
Ashes on the Wood		James Booker Jr.		
Ask Me No Questions	Carl Dobkins Jr	Hank Hunter		
At Last	Gene Watson	Jay Booker	1991	
Äsken särkyi sydämeni	Marjatta Leppänen	Howard Greenfield, Tuntematon	1961	Finnish "Breakin' in a Brand New Broken Heart"
Autumn Reverie		Wendell Tracy		
Be My Life, Be My Love	Jane, Joan And Maryann	Noel Sherman	1958	
Beach Buggy	The Shutdowns	Scotty McKay, Kirby St. Romain	1963	
Beats There a Heart So True	Perry Como	Noel Sherman	1958	Billboard #28 (as b-side of “Moon Talk”)
Beautiful Dreamer	Tony Orlando, The Beatles	Stephen Foster, Gerry Goffin,	1963	
Before We Say Goodnight	Poni-Tails	Noel Sherman	1960	
Between the Lines		Jill Preston Williams		
Bewitched	Jack Keller, Lawrence Welk, Barry Gray	Howard Greenfield	1964	
Bione Rhythm (aka Baion Rhythms)	Jimmy Beaumont	Gerry Goffin	1961	
Birds Do It	Rowan & Martin	Howard Greenfield	1966	
Blabbermouth	Billy And Don Har	Hank Hunter	1959	
Bless Her Heart		James Booker Jr.		
Blue's Not a Color		Leah Lane, Eric Saxon		
Bobby Sox Baby		Richard Lynn		
Boomerang	Tina Robin	Carole King		
Bound for Glory (El Camino Real)	Ed Ames	Ernie Sheldon	1971	
Boy		Gerry Goffin		
Bread on the Table		Noel Sherman		aka Love In Your Heart
Break It to Me Gently		Noel Sherman		
Breaking in a Brand New Broken Heart	Connie Francis, the Wilburn Brothers, Debby Boone, Jean Campbell	Howard Greenfield	1961	Billboard #7
Breakin' the Record (For Broken Hearts)		Don Huber		
Brian	Anita Carter	Howard Greenfield	1963	
Bus That Never Comes	Shirley Bassey, Roslyn Kind	Bob Russell		
Call Me Crazy	Connie Francis	Howard Greenfield	1965	
Camp Runamuck	Homer & Jethro	Howard Greenfield	1965	TV Theme
Candy Heart	Jimmy Velvet	Howard Greenfield	1967	
Carefree	Barry Mann	Joe Shapiro		
Cari	Gerry Robinson	Gerry Robinson	1971	
Cashin' In	Connie Francis	Hank Hunter		
Catch Me If I Fall		Larry Kolber, Cindy Mecham		
Caught a Touch of Your Love	Diane Schuur, Grover Washington, B. B. King, Ray Charles, Meg McKay, Mady Kaye, Beverley Staunton, the Jazz Guardians, Joan Crowe, Danielle Blanchard	Craig Bickhart, James Best	1987	
Chained to a Promise	Margie Singleton	Larry Kolber	1962	
Champagne and Roses		Charlie Craig		
Chicken		John Noto, Gerard Theriault		
Chills	Tony Orlando, Gerry & the Pacemakers, Brian Poole and the Tremeloes, Stool Pigeons, Ferlin Husky, the LeRoys, Bern Elliot & the Fenmen, Fruit Eating Bears, Shakers, the Neatbeats, Ria Bartok ^{1}	Gerry Goffin	1962	
Christmas in New York	Tony Orlando and Dawn	Bob Feldman		
Clingin' Vine		Hank Hunter		
Come Looking for Me	Diane Hildebrand	Diane Hildebrand	1969	
Conga (With A Little Bit of Rock & Roll)	Little Eva, Cerrito	Carole King, Gerry Goffin	1961	
Congratulations	Carol Hughes	Gerry Goffin	1959	
Cry a Little Sometimes	Joey Dee and the Starlighters, Karl Denver	Howard Greenfield		
Cry No More	The Teardrops	Joe Shapiro	1959	
Cry on My Shoulder Tonight	Johnny Crawford	Bill Buchanan	1963	
Crystal Ball	The Willis Sisters, Annette Funicello	Gerry Goffin		
Curiosity	Gene McDaniels	Gerry Goffin	1961	
Cute and Collegiate	The Brooktones	Paul Kaufman	1958	
Dancin’ to Our Song	Amber	Vicki Amber Di Lina		
Dancing in the Streets		Noel Sherman		
Deal Me Out		Noel Sherman		
Deep Roots	Rusty Draper	Gerry Goffin	1962	
Desperation Move		Jay Booker		
Die Liebe ist Seltsames Spiel	Connie Francis, Die Jolly Sisters	Howard Greenfield, Ralph Maria Siegel		German "Everybody's Somebody's Fool"
Dimples		Larry Kolber		
Do You Understand		Hank Hunter		
Does Goodnight Mean Goodbye?	Jane Morgan, Dodie Stevens, Vincent Edwards, George Hamilton, Adam Wade, Beverly Wright	Howard Greenfield, Gerry Goffin	1963	
Don't Ask Me to Be Friends	Everly Brothers, Cliff Richard, Merseybeats, Rocking Stars, Bedsit Poets, Teddy Thompson, Kieran Goss	Gerry Goffin	1962	Billboard #48
Don’t Know What’s Coming Tomorrow		Paul Vance		
Don’t Let Him Say Goodbye	Laura Vida	Laura Vida		
Don't Make Me Live Without You		Gerry Goffin		
Don't Read the Letter I Wrote You	Patti Page, Alma Cogan, Miki and Griff	Howard Greenfield	1961	Billboard #65
Don't Try to Fight It, Baby	Eydie Gorme, the Youngsters, Jumping Jewels	Gerry Goffin	1963	Billboard #53
Donna Reed Show Theme		Howard Greenfield		
Down the Road of Love		Hank Hunter		
Dream On Little Fool	Debbie Woods	Hank Hunter	1963	
Early Morning Blues and Greens	The Monkees, Diane Hildebrand, Sue Raney, Jack Keller	Diane Hildebrand	1967	
Easy Come, Easy Go	Bobby Sherman, Mama Cass, Steve Lawrence, Johnny Hartman, Marty Kaniger, Robby Snowden	Diane Hildebrand	1970	Billboard #9
Empty	Martine Dalton	Tony Powers		
Eternity	Buddy Greco	Howard Greenfield	1966	
Everybody Loves a Guy Named Johnny	Cardigan Brothers	Mike Anthony		
Everybody Needs a Fantasy		Laura Vida		
Everybody's Somebody's Fool	Connie Francis, Kitty Wells, Bobby Vee, Loretta Lynn, Lynn Anderson, Pat Boone, Debby Boone, Ernest Tubb, Ted Daigle, Clyde McPhatter, Marie Osmond, Billy Vaughn, Lawrence Welk, Gamma Goochee, Red Garland, Dexter Gordon, Yeda Maria ^{6}, Jim Hadley, Jennifer O'Brien, Birthe Wilke, Jean Campbell	Howard Greenfield	1960	Billboard #1
Fall Guy		Noel Sherman		
Fallen Angel Flying High	Dann Rogers	Don Huber, Dann Rogers	1986	
Fantastico	Perggy Lee, Nat King Cole, H Ortega	Noel Sherman	1959	
Find Yourself a Rainbow	Sally Field	Howard Greenfield	1968	
Finders Keepers	Judy Stone, Kitty Ford	Larry Kolber	1962	
Foolproof		Joe Shapiro		
For All the Wrong Reasons	Ronnie McDowell	Austin Roberts, Peter Udell		
Forgotten Dreams		Gerry Goffin ^{2}		
Forty-Nine Broken Hearts		Richard Rapp, Jack Weiner		
Funny Thing About Time	Guy Mitchell	Howard Greenfield		
Geh' Zu Ihm	Ivo Robic	Gerry Goffin, Schwabach		German "Run to Him"
Get Out of My Life	Dee Dee Warwick	Paul Vance	1975	
Give It Up	Deb-Tones	Joe Shapiro	1958	
Girls Grow Up Faster Than Boys	The Cookies	Gerry Goffin	1964	Billboard #33
Girls Were Made for Boys	Bobby Roy and the Chord-a-Roys, Bob Barravecchia, Delltones	Noel Sherman		
Give It Up		Joe Shapiro		
Give Me Your Lips		Noel Sherman		
Go Fight for Her	The Astronauts	Larry Kolber		
Go Fight Your Heart		Paul Kaufman		
Good Morning Love	Charlene	John Carter	1971	
Gotta Have Your Love	The Sapphires	Tony Powers	1965	Billboard #77
Happy Birthday (Wherever You Are)	Baby Jane	Larry Kolber		
Happy to Be Me		Noel Sherman		
Have a Nice Weekend	McGuire Sisters	Noel Sherman	1959	
Hazel	Jack Keller	Howard Greefield, Helen Miller		theme from TV show
He Who Laughs Last	Freda Payne	Carole King	1962	
He's Got My Sympathy	The Everly Brothers, Gene McDaniels, Ray Adams	Gerry Goffin	1961	
Heart Is a Terrible Thing to Waste		Cyndea Wendell, John Wendell		
Heartache Named Johnny	Jaye P Morgan	Howard Greenfield	1962	
Hey Boy lass doch den Whisky	Manuela	Gerry Goffin, Georg Buschor, Blecher	1963	German "Don't Try to Fight It Baby"
High School Girl	Younger Brothers	Howard Greenfield		
Hitch Hikin'	Romeos	Larry Kolber	1962	
Hits in Heaven		Gerry Goffin, Artie Kaplan		
Hold On Girl (Help Is on its Way)	The Monkees	Ben Raleigh, Billy Carr	1967	
Honky Tonk Lover	Chris Campbell	Bob Feldman, JA Whitmore		
Horse'n'Dog'n'Me		Gerard Theriault		
How Can I Meet Her?	Everly Brothers	Gerry Goffin	1962	Billboard #75
How Did We Let Love Slip By		Laura Vida		
How Long		Don Huber		
How Many Heartaches		Noel Sherman		
Huckleberry Moon		Larry Kolber		
Hula Hoppin'	Idalia Boyd	Carole King, Gerry Goffin		
I Ain't Never Gonna Do You No		Stephen Clark, Wendell Tracy		
I Always Come Back to You		Donna Hicks		
I Always Knew I'd End Up Cryin'		Larry Kolber		
I Believe in the Feelin’		Janet McMahan Wilson, Harvey Wilson		
I Built My World Around a Dream	Damita Jo, Jackie Lee & the Raindrops	Gerry Goffin	1962	
I Can Make You Happy	Laura Vida	Laura Vida		
I Can't Hold Back the Tears	Rita Pavone	Paul Kaufman, Artie Kornfeld, Steve Rossi		
I Can't Sit Down	Marie & Rex	Noel Sherman	1959	
I Cry Like a Baby	Bob Beckman	Larry Kolber		
I Dig		Hank Hunter		
I Don't Deserve a Boy Like You	Barbara English, Chiffons	Larry Kolber	1964	
I Don't Know You Anymore	Bobby Goldsboro	Howard Greenfield	1964	
I Gave You a Rose		Hank Hunter		
I Gotta Be Sure	Robin Clark	Larry Kolber		
I Gotta Find Her		Howard Greenfield		
I Just Got the Message		Noel Sherman		
I Know I'll Love You More Tomorrow	Billy Sills	Larry Kolber	1963	
I Know That's How It'll Be	Cathy Carroll	Larry Kolber		
I Like This Kind of Party	Louis Armstrong	Tony Powers	1965	
I Miss My Surfer Boy Too	The Westwoods	Guy Hemric, Jerry Howard Steiner	1965	
I Only Live for Your Love	Jimmy Mitchell	Joe Shapiro		
I Think It’s Gonna Rain		Howard Greenfield		
I Was a Fool for Leaving You		William Altvater, Carol Coutras Johnson		
I Wish I'd Never Been Born	Patti Page	Howard Greenfield	1960	Billboard #62
I'll Build a Bridge	The New Establishment	Ernie Sheldon	1969	
I’ll Be Everything You’ll Ever		Laura Vida		
I’ll Be There		Larry Kolber, Cindy Mechem		
I’ll Cry You Out of My Heart	Tommy Edwards	Howard Greenfield	1962	
I'll Exit Crying		Larry Kolber		
I'll Love You the Best		Larry Kolber		
I'm Broke	Frankie Avalon	Joe Shapiro	1959	(Billboard #1 as B-side of "Venus")
I’m Not Afraid	Floyd and Jerry	Diane Hildebrand		
I'm on My Way Back Home	The Partridge Family	Bobby Hart	1969	
I've Got a Lot of Things to Do	Johnny Burnette	Hank Hunter	1961	
I've Got My Pride	Jack Jones	Gerry Goffin		
I've Got Nothing Left	Tina Robin	Carole King		
Ich Such 'nen Treuen Mann	Lil Malmkvist	Gerry Goffin, Jean Nicolas	1963	German "Let's Turkey Trot"
If and When	Gogi Grant	Noel Sherman	1959	
If I Didn't Love You So Much	Babs Tino	Gerry Goffin	1961	
If I Don't Find You There	The New Establishment	Ernie Sheldon	1969	
If I Ever Get to Saginaw Again	The Monkees, Leapy Lee, Tony Crane, Ed Ames, Davy Jones	Bob Russell	1968/88	
Il N'y A Rien à Faire	Margot Lefèbvre	Gerry Goffin, Brien	1964	French "Don't Try to Fight It, Baby"
Intimate		Noel Sherman		
Invitation to the Blues		Hank Hunter		
It Hurts Me		Hank Hunter		
It’ll Break Your Heart	Paula Wayne	Sidney Russell		
It's a Brand New Term (But I've Got The Same Old Heartache)	Billy Sills	Larry Kolber		
It’s So Easy to Say	Johnny Nash	Noel Sherman		
It’s Unbearable	Dorothy Jones	Gerry Goffin	1961	
It's Xmas for Christ's Sake		Bob Feldman, Jason Whitmore		
Jamie Boy	Jane Morgan	Ralph Freed		
Jimmy verzeih' mir noch einmal	Siw Malmkvist	Howard Greenfield, Carl Ulrich Blecher	1962	German "Don't Read The Letter I Wrote You"
Just Between You and Me	The Chordettes	Cathy Lee	1957	Billboard #8
Just Couldn't Resist Her (With Her Pocket Transistor)	Alma Cogan, Danny Jordan, Hisahiko Ida, the Peanuts	Larry Kolber	1960	
Just for Old Times Sake	McGuire Sisters, Ferlin Husky, Prairie Oyster, Eddy Arnold, Jim Ed Brown, Wilburn Brothers, Rhonda Vincent	Hank Hunter	1961	Billboard #20
Just Think of Tonight	James Darren, The Fun City	Tony Powers	1964	
Keep in Touch	Georgia Gibbs	Noel Sherman	1959	
King of the Mountain		Howard Greenfield		(from film "Winter-a-Go-Go")
Kirjeeni polta kun saat sen	Four Cats	Howard Greenfield, Puhtila Sauvo Niilo Pellervo	1962	Finnish "Don't Read The Letter"
Kiss Me Goodbye		Howard Greenfield		
Lass Uns Schnell Vergessen	Cliff Richard	Gerry Goffin, Olden	1962	German "Don't Ask Me To Be Friends"
Lazy Louise		Hank Hunter		
Lead Me On	Steve Lawrence and Eydie Gorme	Ernie Shelton	1971	
Let's Go to the Movies	Cardigan Brothers	Howard Greenfield		
Let's Keep It That Way		Gerry Goffin		
Le Turkey Trot	Rita Pavone	Gerry Goffin, Rudi Révil, Georges Aber	1963	French "Let's Turkey Trot"
Let's Turkey Trot	Little Eva, Jan and Dean, Dreamlovers, Ian and the Zodiacs, Alpha Zoe, Today's Sounds, Brian Poole and the Tremeloes, Donald Lautrec ^{7}	Gerry Goffin	1963	Billboard #20
Like a Waterfall	The Curls	Hank Hunter	1960	
Lipstick And Rouge	Jerry Fuller	Joe Shapiro	1959	
Little by Little	The Springfields	Larry Kolber	1962	
Little Girl Lost	Bobby Roy and the Chord-a-Roys, Bob Barravecchia	Noel Sherman		
Little Hollywood Girl	The Crickets, the Everly Brothers, Tommy Roe	Gerry Goffin	1962	
Locket		Larry Kolber		
Lonely Tomorrows	Tony Orlando	Larry Kolber	1961	
Look Into My Eyes		Howard Greenfield		
Love Birds		Hank Hunter		
Love Is a Two Way Street	The Chordettes	Noel Sherman	1959	
Love Is the Greatest Addiction		Clayton Lee Trulove		
Love Is Where You Find It		Donna Hicks		
Love on a Rooftop		Howard Greenfield		Theme to TV show of the same name
Love Will Keep Us Going	The New Establishment	Ernie Sheldon	1969	
Love Won't Let Me Quit	Bill Medley, Crystal Gayle	Becky Foster, Austin Roberts	1984	
Lover of Love		Richard Lynn		
Lovey Kravesit	The Everly Brothers, Vic Dana	Howard Greenfield	1966	
Lovin’ or Leavin’		Michele Vice		
Loving Fingers		Noel Sherman		
Lucky in Love with You	Jimmy Clanton	Howard Greenfield	1961	
Magic Wand		Hank Hunter		
Makin' with the Magilla	Little Eva	Tony Powers, Ed Justin	1963	
Mama Teach Me to Charleston	Little Eva	Gerry Goffin	1962	
Marty		Howard Greenfield		
Maybe He'll Come Back To Me	Patti Page	Larry Kolber		
Menolippu	Theresa Rosenius, Merja Lehtinen, Nummisuutarit, Satu Pentikäinen, Perälä Piritta, Tukia Virve, Kari Pesonen, Tarja Viljamaa, Vr Sekakuoroliitto Ry:n Kuoro, Katja Halonen, Gary & Granaatit, Hannu Nurmio, Markku Puputti, Tukia Virve, Peter, Vr:n Laulajat, Vangit Menneisyyden, New Strangers	Hunter Hank, Puhtila Sauvo Niilo Pellervo	1965	Finnish "One Way Ticket To The Blues"
Mister Future		Larry Kolber		
Moon Is Green		Noel Sherman		
Mountain Out of a Molehill	Gerry Robinson	Larry Duncan	1972	
My Baby's a Stranger	Tony Orlando	Charles Koppelman, Don Rubin		
My First and Only Lover	Nat "King" Cole	Artie Kaplan, Paul Kaufman	1963	
My Heart Already Knows	Cathy Carroll	Howard Greenfield, Bill Buchanan	1962	
My Heart Goes Running Back to You	Nick Noble	Gerry Goffin	1962	
My Heart Has a Mind of Its Own	Connie Francis, Connie Smith, Debby Boone, Reba McEntire, Susan Raye, Bill Kirchen, Donnie & the Del Chords, Lois Johnson, Ernie Freeman, Jean Campbell	Howard Greenfield	1960	Billboard #1
My Love	Hugo Montenegro	Ernie Sheldon, Hugo Montenegro	1969	from “here Come The Brides”
My Very First Kiss		Cynthia Brooks		
Never		Larry Kolber		
Never Again		Paul Kaufman		
Never Be Mad For More Than a Day	Gerry Robinson	Larry Duncan	1971	
Never Say Goodbye	Jimmy Beaumont	Larry Kolber		
Next	Billy Brown, Johnny O'Neill	Noel Sherman		
No Girl Have I		Paul Kaufman		
No Nobody		Joe Shapiro		
No One Can Make My Sunshine Smile	The Everly Brothers, the Warriors, Ray Pilgrim and Mike Redway, Joey & the Continentals, Bobby Vee ^{3}	Gerry Goffin	1962	
No One Else	Arena Twins	Jim Krondes	1959	
No One Ever Died of a Broken Heart		Howard Greenfield, Steve Rossi		
No Soap		Noel Sherman		
Nobody Cares		Artie Kaplan		
Nobody's Asking Questions (But Everyone Wants To Know)	Georgia Gibbs, Barry Sisters	Howard Greenfield		
Non Devi Piu	Roberta Mazzoni	Gerry Goffin, Francesco Specchia	1973	Italian "Don't Try to Fight It, Baby"
Non Mandami Piu Florio	Everly Brothers	Gerry Goffin		"How Can I Meet Her?" in Italian
Notify The FBI	Guy Mitchell, Arena Twins ^{4}	Noel Sherman	1959	
Now You Know How It Feels	Wink Martindale	Noel Sherman	1959	(Billboard #7 as b-side of "Deck of Cards")
Now I Lay Me Down to Weep		Cyndea Wendell, John Wendell	1994	
It Started All Over Again	Brenda Lee, Carole King, Kay Barry, Joyce Howard & Dean Stevens, Penny Black	Gerry Goffin	1962	Billboard #29
Once in a Lifetime		Larry Kolber		
One Girl	Barry Mann	Joe Shapiro		
One Little Acre	George Hamilton IV	Noel Sherman		
One More Time With Billy	Anita Bryant	Gerry Goffin		
One Way Ticket (To the Blues)	Neil Sedaka ^{8}, Eruption, Barry Blue, Shadows, Jokers, Original Love, Tanja Thomas, Eleanor Bodel, Ali Sommar, the Spotniks, the Cliffters, Ivy Christie, Norma Jean	Hank Hunter	1959	
Only True Love Can Survive	Billy Sills	Larry Kolber, Billy Sills		
Only You Could Do That to My Heart	Peggy March	Tony Powers	1964	
Our Day Will Come	Frankye Kelly	Noel Sherman		
Our Love		Hank Hunter		
Our Love Will Roll On		James Booker Jr.		
Out of Order Heart		Artie Kaplan		
Pair of Scissors and a Pot of Glue	Dean Reed	Marcus Barkan, Neval Nader	1959	
Pajunköyttä	Four Cats, Laura Kinnunen, Sinikka Lehtevä	Howard Greenfield, Puhtila Sauvo Niilo Pellervo	1960	Finnish "Everybody's Somebodys Fool"
Paluulippu	Sysimetsä Ilkka	Howard Greenfield, Salmi Veikko Olavi	1975	Finnish "One Way Ticket To The Blues"
Parabéns	Célia Vilela	Gerry Goffin, Fred Jorge	1961	Brazilian "Congratulations"
Park Is Closed Today		Mike Robbins		
(I Play The) Part of a Fool	Rocky Hart, Robin Luke, Sal Mineo, Mello-Kings	Larry Kolber	1961	
Please Don't Ask About Barbara	Bobby Vee, Big Buddy Lucas & the Wigglers	Bill Buchanan	1962	Billboard #15
Please, President Kennedy		Howard Greenfield, Steve Rossi		
People Like Me People Like You		Wendell Tracy		
People Like Us		Noel Sherman		
Pity Me		Larry Kolber		
Poði K Njemu	Ivo Robic	Gerry Goffin/Kinel		Serbian/Croatian/Slavic "Run to Him"
Poor Little Rich Boy	Robin Luke	Larry Kolber		
Poor Little Puppet	Jan & Dean, Cathy Carroll	Howard Greenfield	1962	
Porque Sou Bobo Assim		Hank Hunter, O.Scaldelay, J.F. Leggier	1962	Brazilian "(I Play The) Part of a Fool"?
Power of Positive Love		Noel Sherman		
Prends Sa Main	Nicole Cloutier	Gerry Goffin	1972	French (Canadian) version of "Run to Him"
Prom and a Promise		Noel Sherman		
Put Another Memory on the Fire	Akiko Kobayashi	Jill Colucci, Joe Curiale, Barbara Ellen Rothstein	1989	
Put Yourself in My Place	Buddy Greco	Howard Greenfield	1966	
Ready or Not	Helen Reddy, Johnny Mathis	Amber DiLena	1978	Billboard #73
Red Don't Go with Blue	Jimmy Clanton	Larry Kolber	1963	
Redigo	Al Caiola Orchestra	Gerry Goffin	1963	Theme to TV show of the same name
Restons Amis	Dick Rivers	Gerry Goffin, Didier Barbelivien		French version of "Run to Him"
Right Age		Joe Shapiro		
Rock a Cha Cha		Noel Sherman		
Rock and Roll Mambo		Gerry Goffin		
Rt 1 Box 595		Jill Cooke		aka Jill and Jack Collection
Rückflug-Ticket auf den Mond	Nina & Mike	Hank Hunter, Peter Orloff	1979	German "One Way Ticket To The Blues"
Rumba Rhythms		Gerry Goffin		
Rumba Tziganeasca ^{5}	Fanfare Ciocarlia, Nederlands Blazers Ensemble	Hank Hunter, Frank Farian	1999	
Runna skivor	Tores	Howard Greenfield, Gerhard Åke	1989	Finnish "Everybody's Somebody's Fool"
Run to Him (Run To Her)	Bobby Vee, The Lettermen, Donny Osmond, Errol Sober, John Davidson, Jon Nickell, Ranji, Albert West, Little Eva, Beverly Bremers, Jennifer Warnes, Susie Allanson, Colleen Peterson, Big Buddy Lucas & the Wigglers, R. Stevie Moore, Eddie Jason, Labi Siffre, Pat Shannon, Jimmy Tarbuck, Susan Jacks, Gert Lengstrand, Ed Rambeau, Aki Aleong And His Licorice Twisters, Rikki Henderson, Robert Barrie, Mark SaFranko, Cydi Hitt	Gerry Goffin	1961	Billboard #2
Saturday Swingout	Four Aces	Noel Sherman		
Say Hello (Goodbye Makes Me Cry)	Cardigan Brothers	Paul Kaufman, Mike Anthony		
School Girl Crush		Paul Kaufman		
School Is Cruel		Noel Sherman		
Seattle	Perry Como, Bobby Sherman, Connie Smith, Floyd Cramer, Hugo Montenegro, Dudley Manlove, the New Establishment, Game Theory	Ernie Sheldon, Hugo Montenegro	1969	Theme from "Here Come The Brides", Billboard #38
Seven Minutes in Heaven	Poni-Tails	Noel Sherman	1958	
Sexy Sady		James Booker Jr.		
She Doesn't Know It	Tony Orlando, Jay and the Americans	Artie Kornfeld		
She's Back		Clifford Buckosh		
Shipmates		Howard Greenfield		
Short Hair and Turtleneck Sweater	Billy Adams	T. Bennett, Paul Sarah		
Sick Chick	The Wild Tones	Noel Sherman	1959	
Silver Platter		Sol Parker	1962	
Sixteen Cubes of Sugar	Bernie Knee w. Carole King, Brian Hyland	Howard Greenfield		
Sixteen Years Ago Tonight	Kenny Karen	Howard Greefield, Kenny Karen		
Ski City		Howard Greenfield		(from film "Winter-a-Go-Go")
Smokey Mountain Blue		Charlie Craig		
Snakey	Smokey Owens	Artie Kaplan, Tony Orlando		
Sneaking 'Round Corners	David Geddes, Charlie Ross	Paul Vance	1975	
So wie es damals war	Siw Malmkvist	Howard Greenfield, Ralph Maria Siegel	1960	German "My Heart Has a Mind of Its Own"
Some Dreams		Beckie Foster, Austin Roberts		
Somebody Who Knows How to Turn		Donna Hicks		
Someone Back Home		William Buchanan, Ted Cooper		
Sow the Seeds of Happiness	Perry Como	Noel Sherman		
Spark of Love		Clayton Lee Trulove		
Standing in the Ruins (Of Our Old Love Affair)	Connie Francis, Keely Smith	Howard Greenfield	1965	
Star Girl		Clayton Lee trulove		
Stay by Me		Noel Sherman		
Story of the Civil War	Barry Mann	Brooks Arthur, Artie Kaplan		
Stranger in the World	Bobby Rydell	Howard Greenfield		
Stroke My Ego		Bill Altvater, Carol Johnson		
Stupid Idiot		Artie Kaplan		
Sugar Dumplin'	Gerry Robinson	Larry Duncan	1972	
Summerschool Blues	Don Cherry	Noel Sherman	1959	
Sun tahtoisin tietävän sen	Arja Koriseva	Howard Greenfield,	1990	Finnish "Everybody's Somebody's Fool"
Sweet Sad Clown	Society of Seven	Diane Hildebrand		
Tear Drops		Hank Hunter		
Le Temps Des Amour	Robert Demontigny	Diane Hildebrand, J Blanchet		
That's How It Will Be		Larry Kolber		
That's How Much	Brian Hyland	Brooks Arthur, Artie Kaplan	1960	Billboard #74
That's Just What You Are		Larry Kolber		
That's What I Call True Love	Bernie Knee w. Carole King, Carl Dobkins Jr	Gerry Goffin		
That's Where My Lovin' Goes	Conway Twitty	Larry Kolber	1961	
The Coming Home Party	Tiny Tim	Diane Hildebrand	1968	
The Doll House Is Empty	The Everly Brothers	Howard Greenfield	1966	
The Lovin' Touch	Mark Dining, Tony Orlando	Gerry Goffin	1960	Billboard #84
The Trouble with Boys	Little Eva, Lulu	Gerry Goffin	1963	
There But for Her Go I	Capris Sisters	Noel Sherman		
There Must Be a Reason	The Brooktones	Paul Kaufman	1958	
There's a Broken Heart (For Every Song on the Jukebox)	Steve Rossi, Carl Stevens	Larry Kolber		
There's a Reason		Joe Shapiro		
There’s So Much About My Baby That I Love	Paris Sisters, Angela Deen, Dianne Christian	Larry Kolber		
These Are the Times That Make		Larry Kolber		
This Changing World		Howard Greenfield		
This Is for Real		Joe Shapiro		
This Little Fool	Jodie Sands	Artie Kaplan		
This Time I'm Losing You	Tommy Regan	Howard Greenfield, Tony Orlando	1964	
Thorn on the Rose	Joe Dowell	Larry Kolber	1962	
Three O’Clock Thrill	Kalin Twins, Daddy Cool	Noel Sherman	1958	Billboard #5 (as b-side of "When")
Tomorrow Land		Noel Sherman		
Too Smart for My Own Good	Barry Sisters	Larry Kolber	1963	
Torchy		Hank Hunter		
Train		Hank Hunter, Jeremy Willis		
Trem Do Amor	Célia Vilela	Hank Hunter, Fred Jorge	1960	Brazilian "Down the Road of Love"?
Tu Es Pris Au Piège	Catherine Alfa	Gerry Goffin, Manou Roblin	1963	French "Don't Try to Fight It, Baby"
20th Century Christian		Sydney Stroud Thomas		
Twenty-One Gun Salute		Noel Sherman		
Twistin' Up a Storm	The Lone Twister	Larry Kolber	1962	
Two Strings Two Beans One		Gerard Theriault		
Unknown Soldier		Howard Greenfield		
Usko en ihmeisiin	Camilla Stähle	Howard Greenfield, Tuominen Tarmo Juhani	1981	Finnish "My Heart Has a Mind of Its Own"
Venus in Blue Jeans	Jimmy Clanton, Mark Wynter, Bruce Bruno, Sammy Hall, Barry Mann, Ray Adams, Big Buddy Lucas & the Wigglers, The Pop Paraders	Howard Greenfield	1962	Billboard #7
Victim		Jesse Boyce		
Wackiest Ship in the Army		Howard Greefield, Helen Miller	1965	TV show theme
Waiting for Your Love	Barry Mann	Joe Shapiro		
Walking in the Footsteps of a Fool	Ben E. King, Eddie Fisher, Wally Lewis, Al Brumley	Howard Greenfield	1961	
Walking to School	Kalin Twins	Noel Sherman		
Wanted: One Girl	Jan & Dean	Charles Koppelman, Don Rubin	1961	Billboard 'bubbler' at #104
We All Need to Send Our Love Around the World	Laura Vida	Laura Vida		
We Proved Them Wrong	Julie London	Larry Kolber		
We're Not Friends Anymore	The Twins, Bobby Vee ^{3}	Howard Greenfield	1966	
What a Lovely Party	Buchanan And Greenfield	Howard Greenfield	1964	Howard Greenfield, Hugh Buchanan
What a Nice Way to Turn Seventeen	The Crystals	Larry Kolber	1962	
What Do I See in the Girl	Freddie Scott, Ernie Andrews	Gerry Goffin	1963	
What Do You See In The Future	Brooks Arthur	Larry Kolber	1960	
What’s Come Over This World	Billy Carr	Howard Greefield	1965	
What's Your Name	Gerry Robinson	Gerry Robinson	1971	
When Does Friendship End	Debbie Stuart	Larry Kolber	1962	
When I’m Right You Don’t Remember	Jimmy Rodgers	Howard Greefield, Billy Hill		
When Kiss Comes to Love	Harold Littrell	Bob Feldman, Russ Keller		
When Somebody Loves You	Frank Sinatra	Howard Greenfield, Keely Smith	1965	
When the Boys Meet the Girls	Connie Francis	Howard Greenfield	1965	
When You Get What You Want	Lou Monte, Jaye P. Morgan	Howard Greefield	1967	
When You're Gone from Me	Barry Mann	Hank Hunter		
Who	Gary Crosby	Cynthia Weil		
Who Do You Think You Are	Four Lads	Noel Sherman		
Who Cares About You?		Howard Greenfield		
Who Is It	Carlton the Doorman	Lorenzo Music, Henrietta	1975	Carlton is aka Lorenzo Music, from the TV show “Rhoda”
Whole New World		Sidney Russell		From Season 2 of The Flying Nun
Why Don't You Love Me	Sal Mineo, Billy Sills	Larry Kolber		
Winter A Go Go	The Hondells	Howard Greenfield	1966	from film "Winter-a-Go-Go"
Wish I Knew	Hugo Montenegro	Ernie Sheldon, Hugo Montenegro		(FROM "Here Come the Brides")
Without a Shadow of a Doubt		Stephen Clark, Wendell Tracy		
Woman Is a Sentimental Thing	Paul Anka	Howard Greenfield	1967	
World in My Arms	Nat King Cole	Noel Sherman		
Yksin sua	Johnny & the Dodgers	Hank Hunter, Tuntematon	1980	Finnish "Part of a Fool"
You Can Believe Me		Danny Rogers, Sunday Sharpe		
You Can Never Get Away from Me	Georgia Gibbs, Susan Maughan	Howard Greenfield	1963	
You Can’t Have Your Cake And Eat It Too	Gerry Robinson	Larry Duncan	1971	
You Gotta Rock You Gotta Roll		Richard Lynn		
You Never Looked as Beautiful	Brooks Arthur	Hank Hunter		
You Taught Me How to Love You		Howard Greenfield		
You Took Me for a Ride		Hank Hunter		
You're Boss		Brooks Arthur		
You've Got the Style		Tony Powers		
Young and Innocent		Hank Hunter		
Your Auntie Grizelda	The Monkees, Magic Lanterns	Diane Hildebrand	1967	
Your Second Choice	Clyde McPhatter	Larry Kolber	1961	
Your Used to Be	Brenda Lee, Ginny Starr, Janie Caren	Howard Greenfield	1963	Billboard #32
Yum Yum Yum	The Cinderellas	Noel Sherman		

== Notes ==
1. French language version by Keller/Goffin/Roblin
2. BMI credits Goffin-Keller, Songwriters Hall of Fame credits Goffin-King
3. Unreleased
4. record label for Arena Twins lists songwriting credit as "B. Mann - N. Sherman"
5. the "wild gypsy brass band version" of "One Way Ticket (To The Blues)"
6. Brazilian, translation by Fred Jorge
7. as "Dansez Le Turkey Trot", translation by Donald Lautrec
8. also as "Passaje De Ida"
