= The Songs I Love =

The Songs I Love may refer to:

- The Songs I Love (album), an album by Perry Como
- "The Songs I Love" (song), a 1963 song with music written by Jimmy Van Heusen and lyrics by Sammy Cahn
