= We're Not Friends =

We're Not Friends may refer to:

== Film and television ==
- "We're Not Friends" (How to Get Away with Murder), a 2014 television episode
- "We're Not Friends" (Battle for Dream Island), a 2025 web series episode
- "We're Not Friends", a 2024 episode of Blue Archive the Animation
- We're Not Friends, a 2016 web series with Marisa Davila, Drew Lynch, and Christopher Titus
- We're Not Friends, a 2020 film starring Rio Teramoto

== Music ==
- "We're Not Friends", a 2018 song by Jacob Sartorius produced by The Monsters & Strangerz
- "We're Not Friends", a 2019 song by Ingrid Andress from the 2020 album Lady Like

== See also ==
- Friends (disambiguation)
- "Not Friends", a 2021 song by Loona
- Not Friends (film), a 2023 Thai film
- "Okay, We're Not Friends", a 2022 instrumental by Tom Holkenborg from Sonic the Hedgehog 2 (soundtrack)
- "We're Not Friends Anymore", a 1966 song by The Twins and Bobby Vee written by Jack Keller
