= A Bobby Vee Recording Session =

Studio album by Bobby Vee
- Released: May 1962
- Genre: Rock and roll
- Length: 25:35
- Label: Liberty
- Producer: Snuff Garrett

Bobby Vee chronology
Take Good Care of My Baby (1962)	A Bobby Vee Recording Session (1962)	Bobby Vee Meets the Crickets (1962)

Singles from A Bobby Vee Recording Session
- 1. "Please Don't Ask About Barbara" Released: February 2, 1962; 2. "Sharing You" Released: April 27, 1962; 3. "A Forever Kind of Love" Released: September 1962

A Bobby Vee Recording Session is the sixth studio album American singer Bobby Vee, and was released in May 1962 by Liberty Records.

== Chart performance and singles ==
It contains the hit singles "Sharing You" and "Please Don't Ask About Barbara", plus "In My Baby's Eyes" and a couple singles contenders, "My Golden Chance", and another Crickets composition, "Teardrops Fall Like Rain". "Sharing You" and "Please Don't Ask About Barbara" both peaked at number 15 on the Billboard Hot 100 singles chart in the United States, and at numbers 29 and 10, respectively, in the United Kingdom.

The album debuted on Billboard Top LPs chart in the issue dated July 21, 1962, and remained on the chart for 6 weeks, peaking at No. 121. It was more successful in The UK, where it spent for 11 weeks on the album chart there peaking at No. 10.

== Later releases ==
The album was released on compact disc by Beat Goes On on March 10, 1999 as tracks 13 through 24 on a pairing of two albums on one CD with tracks 1 through 12 consisting of Vee's 1962 album, Take Good Care of My Baby. Reel To Reel labels included this CD in a box set entitled Eight Classic Albums Plus Bonus Singles and was released on October 4, 2019.

== Reception ==
Professional ratings
Review scores
Source	Rating
AllMusic	3.5/5 stars
The Encyclopedia of Popular Music	4/5 stars
Disc	3/5 stars

Billboard selected the album for a "Spotlight Album" review, stating that it featured "the young artist, is in fresh, appealing vocal form on this collection of teen-appeal tunes, featuring many of his own and other' singles hit. Best sides are "You Better Move On", "Please Don't Ask About Barbara", "In My Baby's Eyes" and "My Golden Chance".

Cashbox noted that "Vee dishes up polished arrangements of "What's Your Name," & his recent hit of "Please Don't Ask About Barbara".

Bruce Eder of AllMusic said that "It's impossible to get too far past that thought, or the memory of Holly's "It Doesn't Matter Anymore" and "Raining in My Heart" in listening to this polished piece of teen idol pop/rock from Vee. He even does "Teardrops Fall Like Rain," a song written by and originally recorded by the post-Holly Crickets."

== Track listing ==
=== Side one ===
No.	Title	Writer(s)	Length
1.	"What's Your Name"	Claude Johnson	2:02
2.	"My Golden Chance"	Dewayne Blackwell	2:29
3.	"You Better Move On"	Arthur Alexander	2:39
4.	"Please Don't Ask About Barbara"	Bill Buchanan, Jack Keller	2:01
5.	"Forget Me Not"	Les Vandyke	1:47
6.	"Sharing You"	Gerry Goffin, Carole King	2:03

=== Side two ===
No.	Title	Writer(s)	Length
1.	"In My Baby's Eyes"	Gerry Goffin, Carole King	2:05
2.	"Tenderly Yours"	D.W. Cobb	2:05
3.	"I Can't Say Goodbye"	Gerry Goffin, Carole King	2:05
4.	"Teardrops Fall Like Rain"	Jerry Allison, Tommy Garrett, Glen Hardin	1:38
5.	"Guess Who"	Jesse Belvin, Jo Ann Belvin	2:40
6.	"A Forever Kind of Love"	Gerry Goffin, Jack Keller	2:23

== Chart positions ==
Chart performance for A Bobby Vee Recording Session
Chart (1962)	Peak position
US Billboard Top Albums	121
UK Record Retailer Top Albums	10

Singles

Single	Year	Chart	Peak position
"Please Don't Ask About Barbara"	1962	Billboard Hot 100	15
"Please Don't Ask About Barbara"	1962	UK Singles Chart	28
"Please Don't Ask About Barbara"	1962	Cashbox Top 100 Singles	18
"Please Don't Ask About Barbara"	1962	Canada CHUM/RPM	6
"I Can't Say Goodbye"	1962	Billboard Hot 100	92
"I Can't Say Goodbye"	1962	Cashbox Top 100 Singles	90
"Sharing You"	1962	Billboard Hot 100	15
"Sharing You"	1962	UK Singles Chart	10
"Sharing You"	1962	Cashbox Top 100 Singles	20
"In My Baby's Eyes"	1962	Cashbox Looking Ahead	121
"A Forever Kind of Love"	1962	UK Singles Chart	13
