= Here Comes That Feeling =

- Danish release picture sleeve

Single by Brenda Lee
- A-side: "Everybody Loves Me But You"
- Released: April 1962
- Genre: Pop
- Length: 2:01
- Label: Decca 31379
- Songwriter(s): Dorsey Burnette, Joe Osborn

Brenda Lee singles chronology
"Speak to Me Pretty" (1962)	"Here Comes That Feeling" (1962)	"Heart in Hand" / "It Started All Over Again" (1962)

"Here Comes That Feeling" is a song written by Dorsey Burnette and Joe Osborn. It is best known as a hit for Brenda Lee. In 1962, the song reached No.5 in the UK, No. 40 in Australia, and No.89 on the Billboard Hot 100. In 2000, a recording of it by The Cockroaches was used in the soundtrack of the film The Crossing.

== Recording History ==
- Richard Anthony, 1962
- Kay Barry and Redd Wayne, 1962
- Brenda Lee, 1962
- The Four Dreamers, 1962
- Donna Lynn and The Mafala Kootchie Whistlers, 1964
- The Anita Kerr Quartet, c 1965
- The Gaylettes, 1968
- AJ Webber, 1976
- The Cockroaches, 1990
- El Perro del Mar, 2005
- Fortyfive RPM, 2005
- Roxy Wilde, 2011
- Thee Cha Cha Chas, 2016
- Nick Lowe, 2020
