= Susie Allanson =

American country music singer (born 1952)

- Born: March 17, 1952 (age 74); Minneapolis, Minnesota, U.S.
- Genres: Country
- Occupations: Singer; songwriter
- Instrument: Vocals
- Years active: 1970–1987
- Labels: Warner Bros.; Elektra; Curb

Susie Allanson (born March 17, 1952) is an American country music singer and songwriter. Susie was raised in Burbank and lived in Las Vegas from 1963 to 1971. Before beginning her singing career, she toured as part of Jesus Christ Superstar and appeared in the film of the same name. As a singer, she released five studio albums and charted several singles on the Billboard and Cashbox country charts, including the No. 2 hit "We Belong Together". She also had top ten chart success with a cover of Buddy Holly's "Maybe Baby" and "Words" by the Bee Gees. Her early albums were produced by Ray Ruff, her then-husband. The couple subsequently divorced. She later married musician Steve Williams. She now lives in California with her two children, Daniel and Amanda, and her husband.

== Discography ==
=== Albums ===
Title	Album details	Peak positions
Title	Album details	US Country
Susie Allanson	Release date: September 24, 1976; Label: ABC Records	—
A Little Love	Release date: November 1977; Label: Music City Records	—
We Belong Together	Release date: July 18, 1978; Label: Curb/Warner Bros. Records	42
Heart to Heart	Release date: March 28, 1979; Label: Curb/Elektra Records	11
Susie	Release date: July 14, 1980; Label: United Artists Records	—
"—" denotes releases that did not chart

=== Singles ===
Year	Title	Peak positions		Album
Year	Title	US Country	CAN Country	Album
1976	"Love Is a Satisfied Woman"	—	—	Susie Allanson
1977	"Baby, Don't Keep Me Hangin' On"	23	—	We Belong Together
1977	"Baby, Last Night Made My Day"	20	—	We Belong Together
1978	"Maybe Baby"	7	14	We Belong Together
1978	"We Belong Together"	2	4	We Belong Together
1978	"Back to the Love"	17	13	We Belong Together
1979	"Words"	8	7	Heart to Heart
1979	"Two Steps Forward and Three Steps Back"	6	51	Heart to Heart
1979	"Without You"	79	—	—N/a
1979	"I Must Be Crazy"	38	—	—N/a
1980	"While I Was Makin' Love to You"	31	—	Susie
1980	"Dance the Two Step"	23	—	Susie
1981	"Run to Her"	53	—	Sleepless Nights (unreleased)
1981	"Love Is Knockin' at My Door (Here Comes Forever Again)"	44	—	Sleepless Nights (unreleased)
1981	"Hearts (Our Hearts)"	60	—	Sleepless Nights (unreleased)
1982	"Wasn't That Love"	62	—	Sleepless Nights (unreleased)
1987	"Where's the Fire"	67	—	—N/a
1987	"She Don't Love You"	70	—	—N/a
"—" denotes releases that did not chart
