= Everybody Loves Me But You =

- Japanese release picture sleeve

Single by Brenda Lee
- B-side: "Here Comes That Feeling"
- Released: 16 April 1962
- Recorded: 7 March 1962
- Genre: Vocal
- Length: 2:26
- Label: Decca 31379
- Songwriter: Ronnie Self
- Producer: Owen Bradley

Brenda Lee singles chronology
"Speak to Me Pretty" (1962)	"Everybody Loves Me But You" (1962)	"Heart in Hand" / "It Started All Over Again" (1962)

"Everybody Loves Me But You" is a song written by Ronnie Self and performed by Brenda Lee. The song reached #2 on the adult contemporary chart and #6 on the Billboard Hot 100 in 1962.

The song was ranked #73 on Billboard magazine's Top Hot 100 songs of 1962.

== In media ==
- Lee's version was featured on season 5 Cold Case episode, "Boy Crazy".
