= Don't Ask Me to Be Friends =

Single by The Everly Brothers
- B-side: "No One Can Make My Sunshine Smile"
- Released: 1962
- Recorded: July 11, 1962
- Genre: Pop
- Length: 2:27
- Label: Warner Bros. Records
- Songwriter(s): Gerry Goffin & Jack Keller

The Everly Brothers singles chronology
"I'm Here to Get My Baby Out of Jail" (1962)	"Don't Ask Me to Be Friends" (1962)	"Nancy's Minuet" (1963)

"Don't Ask Me to Be Friends" is a song written by Gerry Goffin and Jack Keller, which was released in 1962 by The Everly Brothers. The song spent 7 weeks on the Billboard Hot 100 chart, peaking at No. 48, while reaching No. 16 on Billboard's Middle-Road Singles chart.

== Chart performance ==
Chart (1962)	Peak position
US Billboard Hot 100	48
US Billboard - Middle-Road Singles	16

== Cover versions ==
- The song was covered by Teddy Thompson as a hidden track for Upfront & Down Low in 2007, by Cliff Richard for his 1970 album Tracks 'n Grooves and by Joe Junior for his 1973 album VIth.
