= Take Good Care of My Baby =

1961 song by Bobby Vee

Single by Bobby Vee

from the album Take Good Care of My Baby
- B-side: "Bashful Bob"
- Released: July 20, 1961
- Recorded: June 21, 1961
- Studio: United Recording Studios, Hollywood, California
- Genre: Pop
- Length: 2:36
- Label: Liberty
- Songwriters: Carole King; Gerry Goffin
- Producer: Snuff Garrett

Bobby Vee singles chronology
"How Many Tears" / "Baby Face" (1961)	"Take Good Care of My Baby" (1961)	"Run to Him" / "Walkin' With My Angel" (1961)

"Take Good Care of My Baby" is a song written by Carole King and Gerry Goffin. The song was made famous by American singer Bobby Vee, when it was released in 1961.

== Bobby Vee versions ==
While searching for material for Bobby Vee to record, Vee's producer Snuff Garrett heard a demo of Carole King singing "Take Good Care of My Baby". Garrett told publisher Don Kirshner that he wanted the song for Vee, but he believed the song needed an introductory verse. Garrett met with Carole King, and the introductory verse of Vee's version was written.

Among the musicians on the record were Barney Kessel, Tommy Allsup, and Howard Roberts on guitar, Clifford Hills on bass, Robert Florence on piano, and Earl Palmer on drums, while Sid Sharp did the string arrangements. The Johnny Mann Singers sang backup.

Bobby Vee released "Take Good Care of My Baby" as a single on July 20, 1961, and it was reviewed by Billboard in its issue dated July 31, 1961. Vee's recording quickly became popular, spending 15 weeks on the US Billboard Hot 100, reaching No. 1 on September 18, 1961, and spending three weeks in that position. The song became a major hit internationally as well, reaching No. 1 in Canada, New Zealand, and the United Kingdom.

The song was ranked No. 12 on Billboard's "Hot 100 for 1961 – Top Sides of the Year" and No. 23 on Cash Box's "Top 100 Chart Hits of 1961".

The song was the lead track on Bobby Vee's album, Take Good Care of My Baby, which was released in 1962.

Vee re-recorded the song as a ballad in 1972. He released under his real name, Robert Thomas Velline, on his 1972 album Ain't Nothing Like a Sunny Day, and as a single in 1973. However, it is his original version, along with Bobby Vinton's, that remain as staples of oldies radio stations.

=== Charts ===
Chart (1961)	Peak position
Australia (Music Maker)	6
Canada (CHUM Hit Parade)	1
Hong Kong	2
Ireland (Evening Herald)	2
New Zealand (Lever Hit Parade)	1
UK (Record Retailer)	3
UK (NME) (Note: Bobby Vee's "Take Good Care of My Baby" and Frankie Vaughan's "Tower of Strength" were classified jointly as NME's number-one single on December 2, 1961.)	1
UK (Record Mirror)	1
US Billboard Hot 100	1
US Cash Box Top 100	1
US Records Disc Jockeys Played Most (Cash Box)	1
US Top Ten Juke Box Tunes (Cash Box)	1

== Bobby Vinton version ==
"Take Good Care of My Baby"

Single by Bobby Vinton

from the album Take Good Care of My Baby
- B-side: "Strange Sensations"
- Released: March 15, 1968
- Recorded: Feb. 16, 1968
- Genre: Pop
- Length: 2:45
- Label: Epic
- Songwriters: Carole King; Gerry Goffin
- Producer: Billy Sherrill

Bobby Vinton singles chronology
"Just as Much as Ever" (1967)	"Take Good Care of My Baby" (1968)	"Halfway to Paradise" (1968)

In 1968, the song was released by American singer Bobby Vinton as a single and on his seventeenth album, Take Good Care of My Baby (1968). Vinton's version became a hit, spending 8 weeks on the US Billboard Hot 100, reaching No. 33, while reaching No. 14 on Billboard's Easy Listening chart, No. 19 on Record World's "100 Top Pops", No. 12 on Record World's "Top Non-Rock" chart, No. 36 on Canada's "RPM 100", and No. 16 on Canada's CHUM Hit Parade. Vinton's version omitted the introduction, plus the first two lines of the repeated refrain.

=== Charts ===
Chart (1968)	Peak position
Canada Top 100 (RPM)	36
Canada (CHUM Hit Parade)	16
US Billboard Hot 100	33
US Easy Listening (Billboard)	14
US Cash Box Top 100	26
US Record World 100 Top Pops	19
US Top Non-Rock (Record World)	12
US Juke Box Top 25 (Record World)	4

== Smokie version ==
"Take Good Care of My Baby"

Single by Smokie

from the album Solid Ground
- B-side: "I Wanna Kiss Your Lips"
- Released: 1980
- Length: 3:15
- Label: RAK
- Songwriters: Gerry Goffin; Carole King
- Producer: Smokie

Smokie singles chronology
"San Francisco Bay" (1979)	"Take Good Care of My Baby" (1980)	"Run to Me" (1980)

In 1980, English rock band Smokie released a version of the song, which spent seven weeks on the UK Singles Chart, reaching No. 34, while reaching No. 10 on Austria's Ö3 Hit wähl mit chart, No. 15 on the Irish Singles Chart, and No. 18 in West Germany. It was later released on their 1981 album Solid Ground.

=== Charts ===
Chart (1980)	Peak position
Australia (Kent Music Report)	48

== Other versions ==
Dion recorded a version of the song, which was released on his November 1961 album Runaround Sue. Although Dion's version was released after Bobby Vee's version, Dion's was the first version to be recorded.

The song was performed by the Beatles during their audition at Decca Records on January 1, 1962, with George Harrison on lead vocals. The version has never been released officially, but can be found easily through bootlegs.

Gary Lewis & the Playboys recorded the song for their 1966 album, She's Just My Style.

Donny Osmond released a version of the song on his 1972 album Too Young.

Shaun Cassidy included his rendition of the song on his 1977 debut self-titled album.

Neil Innes included an excerpt of the song in the Re-Cycled Vinyl Blues medley, the title track from his 1994 eponymous album.

As Dick Brave and the Backbeats, German pop star Sasha released a version in 2003, which reached No. 21 in Germany and No. 52 on the Ö3 Austria Top 40.

In 2007, Frankie Valli sang the song on his album Romancing The 60's.

=== Answer songs ===
An answer song, titled "I'll Take Good Care of Your Baby", was recorded by Ralph Emery. It was released as a single on Liberty F-55383, in 1961. Another answer song, titled "You Should Know I'm Still Your Baby", was recorded by Sammi Lynn. It was released as a single on Sue Records 45-752, in 1961.

== See also ==
- Take Good Care of My Baby (Bobby Vee album)
