= Joseph Noyon =

French organist and composer

Joseph-Aimé-Paul Noyon (3 October 1888 – 15 October 1962) was a French organist and composer of classical music.

== Biography ==
Joseph Noyon was born at Cherbourg (France). He studied organ and church music at the Basilica of the Holy Trinity, Cherbourg, and later became the organist at the Church of St. Clément. In 1904 he moved to Paris to study at the École Niedermeyer, where he was student of Charles Wilfrid de Bériot, Paul Viardot, Alfred Marichelle and Henri Dallier and later of Paul Vidal at the Conservatoire de Paris. In later years he became himself teacher of harmony and music theory at the École Niedermeyer.

During his musical career Joseph Noyon was organist and teacher at the Great Organ of the church at Saint-Cloud, teacher at Notre-Dame-d'Auteuil, accompanist to the choirs at Sainte-Chapelle, director of the choirs of the Radiodiffusion-Télévision Française and teacher at the church of Saint-Honoré-d'Eylau for 12 years. He died at Boulogne-Billancourt.

== Compositions ==
He composed more than 400 works, mainly sacred music, among them are

- Hymne à la nuit (La Nuit de Rameau), for mixed chorus a capella
- L'enfance de l'Immaculée for soloists, female chorus, organ and orchestra (dedicated to Rose-Marie Paillet)

=== Motets ===
- Cantate Domino, mixed chorus, 2 organs, trumpets and trombones
- In Me Gratia (motet à la Sainte Vierge), for male chorus
- Jérusalem acclame, for chorus, soloists and organ
- Laudate Dominum in sanctis (Ps. 150), for 2 voices and organ
- Panis Angelicus, for mixed voices and organ
- Notre Père, qui êtes aux cieux, for mixed voices and organ
- Tantum Solennel, dit du Congrès, for male chorus, mixed voices, 2 organs, trumpets and trombones

=== Masses ===
- Messe de la Nativité sur des Noëls populaires, for 2 or 3 mixed voices, 4 mixed voices and organ (1942)
- Messe brève, for chorus and organ
- Messe en l’honneur de Frères des écoles chrétiennes, for 4 mixed voices, organ and instruments ad lib.
- Messe en l’honneur de Saint Augustin, for 4 mixed voices, organ and instruments ad lib.
- Requiem, for soloists, chorus and orchestra (1949)
- Saint Jean-Baptiste de la Salle, oratorio in 7 partes for soloists, chorus, orchestra and organ (1950)
- Messe solennelle Pax Christi, for mixed chorus, 2 organs, trumpets and trombones (1953)

=== Organ ===
- Allegretto en sol
- Élévation en sol majeur (1924)
- Final en ut majeur
- Variations sur un vieux Noël

=== Piano ===
- Impromptu
- Ouverture de concert
- Les heures roses
- Danses grecques

=== Instrumental compositions ===
- Berceuse for violin and piano (1919)
- Arioso for violin and strings
- Elégie for horn and organ or piano
- Lamento for cello
- Aria for string quintet
- Concerto en ré majeur, for organ and orchestra
- Divertissement Pastoral, for oboe
- Esquisses normandes, for wind quartet
- Nocturne
- Marche funèbre
