= The Songs I Love (song) =

Song performed by Perry Como

"The Songs I Love" is a popular song with music written by Jimmy Van Heusen and lyrics by Sammy Cahn. The song was published in 1963. The song was composed for a Perry Como album of the same name.
