= It Started All Over Again =

- Danish release picture sleeve

Single by Brenda Lee
- A-side: "Heart in Hand"
- Released: June 1962
- Genre: Pop
- Length: 2:22
- Label: Decca Records 31407
- Songwriter(s): Gerry Goffin, Jack Keller

Brenda Lee singles chronology
"Everybody Loves Me But You" / "Here Comes That Feeling" (1962)	"It Started All Over Again" (1962)	"All Alone Am I" (1962)

"It Started All Over Again" is a song written by Gerry Goffin and Jack Keller and performed by Brenda Lee. The song reached #15 in the UK and #29 on the Billboard Hot 100 in 1962. The song also reached #37 in Australia.
