= Punish Her =

Single by Bobby Vee

from the album Bobby Vee's Golden Greats
- B-side: "Someday (When I'm Gone from You)"
- Released: August 1962
- Genre: Pop
- Length: 1:52
- Label: Liberty
- Songwriter(s): Neval Nader, John Gluck
- Producer(s): Snuff Garrett

Bobby Vee singles chronology
"Sharing You" (1962)	"Punish Her" (1962)	"A Forever Kind of Love" (1962)

"Punish Her" is a song written by Neval Nader and John Gluck. The song was produced by Snuff Garrett, and performed by Bobby Vee featuring The Johnny Mann Singers. It reached #20 on the Billboard Hot 100 and #32 in Canada in 1962. It was featured on his 1962 album, Bobby Vee's Golden Greats.

The single's B-side, "Someday (When I'm Gone From You)", which featured The Crickets, reached #99 on the Billboard chart.

== Other versions ==
Mike Preston released a version of the song as a single in 1963 in the United Kingdom.
