= Heart in Hand (song) =

- German release picture sleeve

Single by Brenda Lee
- B-side: "It Started All Over Again"
- Released: 2 July 1962
- Recorded: 7 March 1962
- Genre: Pop
- Length: 2:27
- Label: Decca 31407
- Songwriter(s): Jackie DeShannon, Sharon Sheeley
- Producer(s): Owen Bradley

Brenda Lee singles chronology
"Everybody Loves Me But You" / "Here Comes That Feeling" (1962)	"Heart in Hand" (1962)	"All Alone Am I" (1962)

"Heart in Hand" is a song written by Jackie DeShannon and Sharon Sheeley and performed by Brenda Lee. The song reached No.4 on the adult contemporary chart and No.15 on the Billboard Hot 100 in 1962. It reached No. 37 in Australia.
