= The Volumes =

The Volumes (sometimes written as The Volume's) were an American R&B vocal group formed in 1960 in Detroit, Michigan, United States. The group's 1962 single for Chex Records, "I Love You", was a hit in the U.S., peaking at number 22 that year on the Billboard Hot 100. The tune was an amalgam of doo wop and Latin beats, and was co-written by bass Ernest Newson and the group's manager, Willie Ewing. The group recorded further singles for Chex and American Arts but never returned to the charts, remaining archetypical one-hit wonders.

== Members ==
- Ed Union
- Elijah Davis
- Larry Wright
- Joe Travillion
- Ernest Newson
- Herb Hamlett
- Clarence Berger Jr.
