= Sharing You =

Single by Bobby Vee

from the album A Bobby Vee Recording Session
- B-side: "In My Baby's Eyes"
- Released: April 1962
- Genre: Pop
- Length: 2:03
- Label: Liberty
- Songwriter(s): Gerry Goffin, Carole King
- Producer(s): Snuff Garrett

Bobby Vee singles chronology
"Please Don't Ask About Barbara" (1962)	"Sharing You" (1962)	"Punish Her" (1962)

"Sharing You" is a song written by Gerry Goffin and Carole King. The song was produced by Snuff Garrett, and performed by Bobby Vee featuring The Johnny Mann Singers. It reached #10 in the UK, #15 on the Billboard Hot 100, #20 in Canada in 1962. It was featured on his 1962 album, A Bobby Vee Recording Session.

== Other versions ==
- Liverpool Express released a version on their 1979 album, L.E.X..
