= The Songs I Love (album) =

Studio album by Perry Como
- Released: July 1963
- Recorded: March 18–19, 25–26, 1963
- Genre: Vocal
- Label: RCA Victor
- Producer: Hugo & Luigi

Perry Como chronology
The Best of Irving Berlin's Songs from Mr. President (1963)	The Songs I Love (1963)	The Scene Changes (1965)

The Songs I Love was Perry Como's 11th RCA Victor 12" long-play album and the first featuring RCA Victor's Dynagroove technology.

== Critical reception ==
Professional ratings
Review scores
Source	Rating
AllMusic	2.5/5 stars
Record Mirror	4/5 stars

In his review of the album for Record Mirror in January 1964, Jimmy Watson credits Como's typical casual approach to the "first class song material" as he "sings his melodic and soothing way through the twelve" tracks.

Retrospectively, Greg Adams of AllMusic notes how the album cover attempts to reproduce the set of his NBC variety show in which Como sat "on a distinctive set that spelled out 'Mr. C.'" while singing one of his or other fan favorites of the time. Containing a dozen pop standards and soft ballads, the song selection reflects the same attempt to recreate what the producers Hugo & Luigi called "one of the few great traditions in television". Adams concludes by stating that The Songs I Love became "a commercially successful album" by targeting the fans of his television show.

== Chart performance ==
The commercial success of the album was reflected in the charts as The Songs I Love reached No. 59 on the Billboard Top LP's chart in November 1963 and Nos. 52 and 31, respectively, on the monaural and stereo albums charts in Cash Box magazine that October.

== Track listing ==
Side one

1. "The Songs I Love" (music by Jimmy Van Heusen and lyrics by Sammy Cahn) – 3:20
2. "(I Left My Heart) In San Francisco" (music by George Cory and lyrics by Douglas Cross) – 3:17
3. "Fly Me to the Moon" (In Other Words) (words and music by Bart Howard) – 3:20
4. "Slightly Out of Tune" (music by Antônio Carlos Jobim) – 3:12
5. "This is All I Ask" (words and music by Gordon Jenkins) – 3:18
6. "Hawaiian Wedding Song" (Ke Kali Nei Au ) – 2:37

Side two

1. "Days of Wine and Roses" (music by Henry Mancini and lyrics by Johnny Mercer) – 2:43
2. "Carnival" (music by Luiz Bonfá and lyrics by Antonio Maria) – 3:24
3. "My Coloring Book" (music by John Kander and lyrics by Fred Ebb) – 3:33
4. "I Wanna Be Around" (words and music by Johnny Mercer and Sadie Vimmerstedt) – 3:00
5. "When I Lost You" (words and music by Irving Berlin) – 2:55
6. "What Kind of Fool Am I?" (from the 1961 stage musical Stop the World I Want to Get Off) – 2:34

== Charts ==
Chart (1963)	Peak position
US Billboard Top LP's	59
US Cash Box Top 100 Albums (Monaural)	52
US Cash Box Top 50 Stereo	31
