= Run to Him =

Single by Bobby Vee

from the album Take Good Care of My Baby
- B-side: "Walkin' with My Angel"
- Released: October 27, 1961
- Recorded: October 24, 1961
- Genre: Pop
- Length: 2:07
- Label: Liberty Records 55388; UK London
- Songwriters: Gerry Goffin, Jack Keller
- Producer: Snuff Garrett

Bobby Vee singles chronology
"Take Good Care of My Baby" (1961)	"Run to Him" (1961)	"Please Don't Ask About Barbara" (1962)

"Run to Him" is a song written by Gerry Goffin and Jack Keller and performed by Bobby Vee featuring the Johnny Mann Singers. It was produced by Snuff Garrett, and was featured on Vee's 1962 album, Take Good Care of My Baby. One of the musicians on the song was session drummer Earl Palmer.

== Chart performance ==
"Run to Him" reached No. 2 on the Billboard Hot 100., only behind “The Lion Sleeps Tonight”, by The Tokens. It also reached No. 6 in Canada, and No. 6 in the UK in 1961.

The single's B-side, "Walkin' with My Angel", reached No. 53 on the Billboard chart and No. 89 in Canada.

== Charts ==
Chart (1961)	Peak position
US Billboard Hot 100	2
Canada (CHUM Hit Parade)	6

== Other versions ==
- Ivo Robić, in Germany in April 1962 as part of an EP entitled Geh' Zu Ihm.
- Little Eva re-titled the song "Run to Her" and made it the B-side to her single "Makin' with the Magilla" in October 1964.
- Jimmy Tarbuck, as the B-side to his single "Lucky Jim" in March 1972.
- Donny Osmond, on his 1972 solo album Too Young.
- Beverly Bremers recorded it as "Run to Her" on a single in March 1973.
- Susie Allanson, as a single entitled "Run to Her" in 1981 that reached No. 53 on the country chart. It was featured on her album Sleepless Nights.
- Labi Siffre, as a single in January 1981.
- Jennifer Warnes (as "Run to Her") on Best of Jennifer Warnes, 1981
