= Take Good Care of My Baby (Bobby Vee album) =

Studio album by Bobby Vee
- Released: 1962
- Genres: Pop; rock and roll
- Length: 27:37
- Label: Liberty
- Producer: Snuff Garrett

Bobby Vee chronology
Bobby Vee Sings Hits of the Rockin' 50's (1961)	Take Good Care of My Baby (1962)	A Bobby Vee Recording Session (1962)

Singles from Take Good Care of My Baby
- 1. "Take Good Care of My Baby" Released: July 20, 1961; 2. "Run to Him" Released: October 27, 1961

Take Good Care of My Baby is the fifth studio album American singer Bobby Vee and was released in 1962 by Liberty Records.

It contains Vee's best-known hits "Take Good Care of My Baby", "Run to Him", and "Walkin' with My Angel".

The album debuted on the Billboard Top LPs chart in the issue dated February 3, 1962, remaining on the chart for 14 weeks and peaking at No. 91. Take Good Care of My Baby was ranked much higher on the Cashbox albums chart, peaking at No. 29. It entered the UK album chart in February 1962 and spent one week at number seven over the course of 8 weeks.

The album was released on compact disc by Beat Goes On on March 10, 1999, as tracks 1 through 12 on a pairing of two albums on one CD with tracks 13 through 24 consisting of Vee's 1962 album, A Bobby Vee Recording Session. Reel To Reel labels included the album in a box set entitled Eight Classic Albums Plus Bonus Singles and was released on October 4, 2019.

== Reception ==
Professional ratings
Review scores
Source	Rating
The Encyclopedia of Popular Music	4/5 stars
Disc	2/5 stars

Billboard described the album as "His Biggest LP ever."

Cashbox praised Vee for his "deliver[ing] of other favorites with exceptional poise and artistry."

The St. Petersburg Times wrote that "Youthful, personable Bobby Vee includes some of the numbers that have been smash singles".

Robert Reynolds, in The Music of Bobby Vee called it "his strongest album."

== Track listing ==
=== Side one ===
No.	Title	Writer(s)	Length
1.	"Take Good Care of My Baby"	Gerry Goffin, Carole King	2:27
2.	"Will You Love Me Tomorrow"	Goffin, King	2:49
3.	"Remember Me, Huh"	Billy Page	2:39
4.	"He Will Break Your Heart"	Jerry Butler, Calvin Carter, Curtis Mayfield	2:34
5.	"Who Am I?"	Les Vandyke	1:58
6.	"Run to Him"	Goffin, Jack Keller	2:09

=== Side two ===
No.	Title	Writer(s)	Length
1.	"Walkin' with My Angel"	Goffin, King	2:14
2.	"Raining in My Heart"	Felice Bryant, Boudleaux Bryant	2:51
3.	"Go On"	Roy Orbison, Joe Melson	2:20
4.	"Little Flame"	Beverly Ross	1:56
5.	"So You're in Love"	Jerry Allison, Sonny Curtis	2:11
6.	"Hark, Is That a Cannon I Hear"	Jackie DeShannon, Zelda Sands	1:55

== Singles ==
"Take Good Care of My Baby" made its debut on the Billboard Hot 100 chart on August 7, 1961, eventually spending three weeks at number one during its 15-week stay, number one on the Cash Box singles chart, and number 3 in the UK Singles. "Run to Him" made its debut on the Billboard Hot 100 chart on November 13, 1961, eventually spending one week at number two during its 15-week stay, number one on the Cash Box singles chart, and number 4 in the UK Singles. "Walkin' with My Angel" made its debut on the Billboard Hot 100 chart on November 27, 1961, eventually spending one week at number fifty-three during its 9-week stay and number eighty-nine on the Cash Box singles chart.

== Charts ==
Chart (1962)	Peak position
US Billboard Top LPs	91
US Cash Box	29
UK Albums Chart	7

Singles

Year	Single	Chart	Peak
1961	"Take Good Care of My Baby"	US Billboard Hot 100	1
1961	"Take Good Care of My Baby"	UK Singles Chart	3
1961	"Take Good Care of My Baby"	US Cash Box	1
1961	"Take Good Care of My Baby"	Canada CHUM	1
1961	"Run to Him"	US Billboard Hot 100	2
1961	"Run to Him"	US Cash Box	6
1961	"Run to Him"	Canada CHUM	6
1961	"Run to Him"	UK Singles Chart	4
1961	"Walkin' with My Angel"	US Billboard Hot 100	53
1961	"Walkin' with My Angel"	US Cash Box	89
1961	"Walkin' with My Angel"	Canada CHUM	5
