= The Best of Irving Berlin's Songs from Mr. President =

Mr. President

Studio album by Perry Como
- Released: December 1962
- Recorded: September 30, October 1, 2, 1962
- Genre: Vocal
- Label: RCA Victor
- Producer: Hugo & Luigi

Perry Como chronology
By Request (1962)	Mr. President (1962)	The Songs I Love (1963)

The Best of Irving Berlin's Songs from Mr. President is a 1962 album by Perry Como, his tenth RCA Victor 12" long-play album.

== Overview ==
With this album, Como performs select songs from Irving Berlin's then new (and final) Broadway musical, Mr. President. Perry is joined by members of his Kraft Music Hall TV family, Kaye Ballard, Sandy Stewart and the Ray Charles Singers.

== Chart performance ==
The album reached No. 90 on the Billboard Top LP's chart for monaural albums, and stayed on the chart for six weeks.

== Track listing ==
All words and music by Irving Berlin.

Side one

1. Opening
2. "It Gets Lonely in the White House"
3. "The First Lady"
4. "In Our Hide-Away"
5. "The Secret Service"
6. "Pigtails & Freckles"
7. "Is He the Only Man in the World?"

Side two

1. "Is She the Only Girl in the World?"
2. "They Love Me"
3. "I'm Gonna Get Him"
4. "Glad to Be Home"
5. "Song for Belly Dancer"
6. "Empty Pockets Filled With Love"
7. Finale: "This Is a Great Country"

== Charts ==
Chart (1962)	Peak position
US Billboard Top LP's: Monaural	90
