= Bill Buchanan (songwriter) =

American songwriter (1930–1996)

Bill Buchanan (April 30, 1930 – August 1, 1996) was an American songwriter.

== Career ==
His most famous composition took place in 1956, when he and Dickie Goodman created the sound collage "The Flying Saucer". This novelty record marked the beginning of the so-called "break-in record". After Buchanan and Goodman severed their partnership in 1959, Buchanan wrote the song "Please Don't Ask About Barbara" for Bobby Vee. He also co-produced records for other artists, one of which was The Three Stooges. Some records he co-produced with Dickie Goodman, with whom he ran the Luniverse record label.

In 1962, with his then partner, Brill Building veteran Howard Greenfield, he wrote and produced a break-in for a new recording artist, Susan Smith ("A Letter From Susan"/"Will You Love Me When I'm Old?", Dynamic Sound 502). A few years later, she met one of Bill's old partners, Dickie Goodman, and recorded with him, later becoming his wife and the mother of their children, one of which is Jon Goodman, who continues in Dickie's footsteps, making break-in records, and recently wrote the book Dickie Goodman: King Of Novelty.

He also was president of a company manufacturing Disk-Go Cases, a plastic cylindrical portable record storage unit.

In his later years, he worked in a jewelry store in Texas until a few years before his death. He died of cancer on August 1, 1996, at age 66.

== Singles ==
=== Bill Buchanan ===
Gone Records 5032

- The Thing/Oh Happy Day (9/27/1958)

"The Thing" was a cover version of Phil Harris' hit of the same name. "Oh Happy Day" was recorded by someone else, before Buchanan did this version.

United Artists Records 531

- The Night Before Halloween/Beware (10/11/1962)

This was a Halloween-based version of "The Night Before Christmas". "Beware" was also a pretty good Halloween rocker.

=== Buchanan and Ancell ===
Flying Saucer Records 501

- The Creature (From A Science Fiction Movie)/Meet The Creature (From A Science Fiction Movie) (11/30/1957)

This song includes a joke on a break-in when one of the characters tells the creature to stop talking to him in records.

=== Buchanan and Cella with Cast of Thousands ===
ABC-Paramount Records 45-10,033

- Side 1: String Along With Pal-O-Mine
- Side 2: More String Along With Pal-O-Mine/Still More String Along With Pal-O-Mine (8/16/1959)

=== Buchanan and Goodman ===
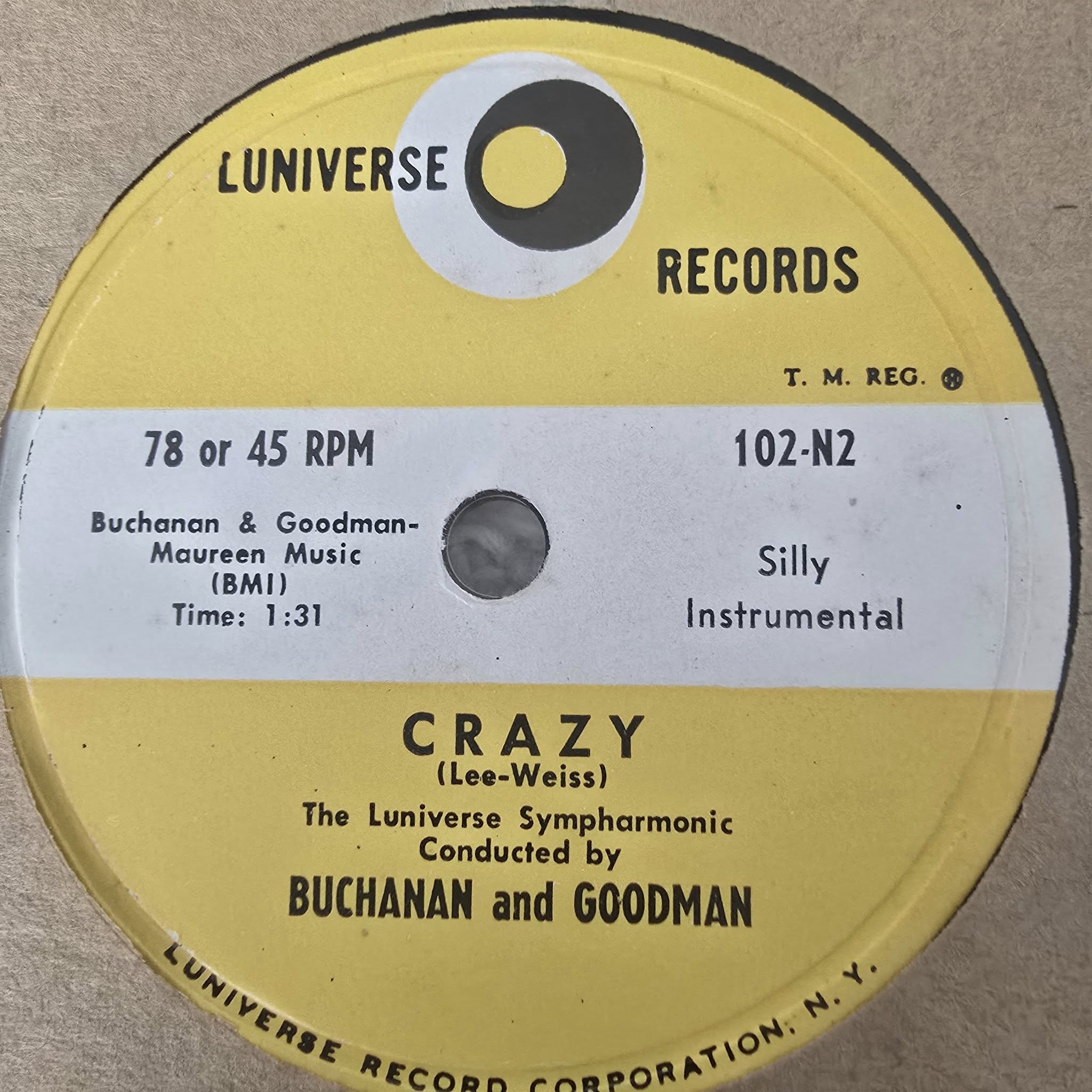
The label of Crazy by Buchanan and Goodman says that it is to be played at "78 or 45 RPM"

Luniverse Records 101

- The Flying Saucer Part 1/The Flying Saucer Part 2 (7/25/1956)

101X

- Back To Earth Part 1/Back To Earth Part 2 (7/25/1956)

102

- Buchanan And Goodman On Trial/Crazy (11/7/1956)

103

- The Banana Boat Story/The Mystery (In Slow Motion) (1957)

105

- Flying Saucer The 2nd/Martian Melody (7/13/1957)

107

- Santa And The Satellite Part 1/Santa And The Satellite Part 2 (12/14/1957)

108

- The Flying Saucer Goes West/Saucer Serenade (1958)

Comic Records 500

- Flying Saucer The Third/The Cha Cha Lesson (1959)

Novelty Records 301

- Frankenstein Of '59/Frankenstein Returns (1959)

=== Buchanan and Greenfield ===
Novel Records 711

- The Invasion/What A Lovely Party (8/11/1964)

=== Other involvements ===
Other records he was involved with: Gone Records 5031 Eddie Platt & His Orch. / Cha-Hua-Hua / Vodka (9/27/58) It's not known for sure if the Bill Buchanan listed on the label as producer of "Vodka" is the same one this page is about, but, since both records on Gone were released back to back, it's a reasonable assumption that they are the same person.

Golden Records The Three Stooges / Party At Your House (1959) This album concept and songs were written by Dick Cella in one week. It was co-produced Dick Cella and Bill Buchanan. The back-up band, The Music Wreckers, was assembled Dick & Bill Studio sessions were co-produced by Dick Cella and Bill Buchanan. The tracks on this album are as follows: We're Coming To Your House The Concert At The Baseball Game Click Dart's Band Stand The Chipped Monks Let's Cut A Record Sing-Along With Moe At The Circus Parts 1 & 2 The Toy Store Parts 1 & 2 Goodbye, Auld Lang Syne!

Golden Records 559 The 3 Stooges / All I Want For Christmas Is My Two Front Teeth / I Gotta Cold For Christmas (12/1959)

Golden Records 623 The 3 Stooges / Sing Happy Yuletide Songs The tracks on this e.p. are as follows: I Want A Hippopotamus For Christmas I Gotta Cold For Christmas Wreck The Halls With Boughs Of Holly Jingle Bells Drag Down Through The Housetop

20th Century Fox Records 45-139 The Little Toy Band / The Little Tin Man / Teeny Little Me (1/1960) This was written and produced by Buchanan & Cella

Guaranteed Records 204 The Prancers / Short Short `nin' / Rudolph The Red-Nose Reindeer (1/1960) This one was produced by Buchanan & Goodman.

Triodex Records 112 James MacArthur / (The Story Of) The In-Between Years - (Parts 1 & 2) (1961) This was also released on Scepter. It was produced and co-written by Bill Buchanan. The singer on this record would turn up in a much more famous Role on the hit t.v. show "Hawaii 5-0". When Steve McGarrett would say, "Book `em Dano!", this is who he was talking to.

Dynamic Sound Records 502 Susan Smith / A Letter From Susan / Will You Love Me When I'm Old? (1962) This was written and produced by Greenfield & Buchanan.

Liberty Records F-55419 Bobby Vee / Please Don't Ask About Barbara / I Can't Say Goodbye (2/24/1962) Barbara was written by Bill Buchanan.

Rori Records 714 Joel Langran / I Really Want To Be A "Singar" / Young And Foolish (1964) Written & produced by Buchanan & Goodman.

Label Unknown Susan Smith (Susan Smith Goodman) / Never Play Poker With A Man Named Doc Or Eat At A Place Called Mom's (1966) Produced by Dickie Goodman and/or Bill Buchanan.
