= By Request (Perry Como album) =

Studio album by Perry Como
- Released: August 1962
- Recorded: June 8, 14, 21, 26, 1962
- Genre: Vocal
- Length: 38:09
- Label: RCA Victor
- Producer: Hugo & Luigi

Perry Como chronology
Sing to Me Mr. C (1961)	By Request (1962)	The Best of Irving Berlin's Songs from Mr. President (1962)

By Request is Perry Como's ninth RCA Victor 12" long-play album.

== Critical reception ==
Professional ratings
Review scores
Source	Rating
AllMusic	4/5 stars

William Ruhlmann of AllMusic noted Como's "change in his approach to recording with his album By Request. While "the title made it sound like a number of his earlier LPs...with the implication that the song choices were made by his audience rather than himself", By Request was made up of more recent material", even recording songs that were recent hits by others. "The material suited Como" and provided him the opportunity to take "a new direction as a singer, anticipating the period when his albums would not be more adjuncts to his television program."

== Chart performance ==
By Request was Como's best-selling non-holiday LP release in three years and reached No. 32 on the Billboard Best Selling Stereo LP's chart.

== Track listing ==
=== Side one ===
1. "Maria" (music by Leonard Bernstein, lyrics by Stephen Sondheim) – 3:28
2. "Lollipops and Roses" (words and music by Tony Velona) – 2:43
3. "The Sweetest Sounds" (words and music by Richard Rodgers) – 2:46
4. "More than Likely" (music by Jimmy Van Heusen, lyrics by Sammy Cahn) – 2:52
5. "Moonglow and Theme from 'Picnic' – 3:23
  - ("Moonglow", words and music by Will Hudson, Eddie DeLange, and Irving Mills)
  - ("Theme from 'Picnic'", words by Steve Allen, music by George Duning)
6. "My Favorite Things" (music by Richard Rodgers, lyrics by Oscar Hammerstein II) – 2:56

=== Side two ===
1. "Once Upon a Time" (music by Charles Strouse, lyrics by Lee Adams) – 3:50
2. "Can't Help Falling in Love" (words and music by George Weiss, Hugo Peretti, and Luigi Creatore) – 3:07
3. "What's New?" (music by Bob Haggart, lyrics by Johnny Burke) – 3:04
4. "Somebody Cares" (music by Johnny Robba, Frank Reardon, and Ernest G. Schweikert) – 3:18
5. "I'll Remember April" (music by Gene DePaul, lyrics by Patricia Johnston and Don Raye) – 3:02
6. "Moon River" (music by Henry Mancini, lyrics by Johnny Mercer) – 3:20

A recording of "The Bells of St. Mary's" was made during the sessions, but left off the completed album. It was not released until its inclusion on the 2001 compilation CD A Perry Como Christmas, which also includes "My Favorite Things" from this album.

== Personnel ==
- Perry Como – vocals
- Peter Gamble – liner notes

== Charts ==
Chart (1962)	Peak position
US Billboard Top LP's: Stereo	32
US Billboard Top LP's: Monaural	54
US Cash Box Best Selling Albums: Stereo	39
