= Symphony No. 6 (Chávez) =

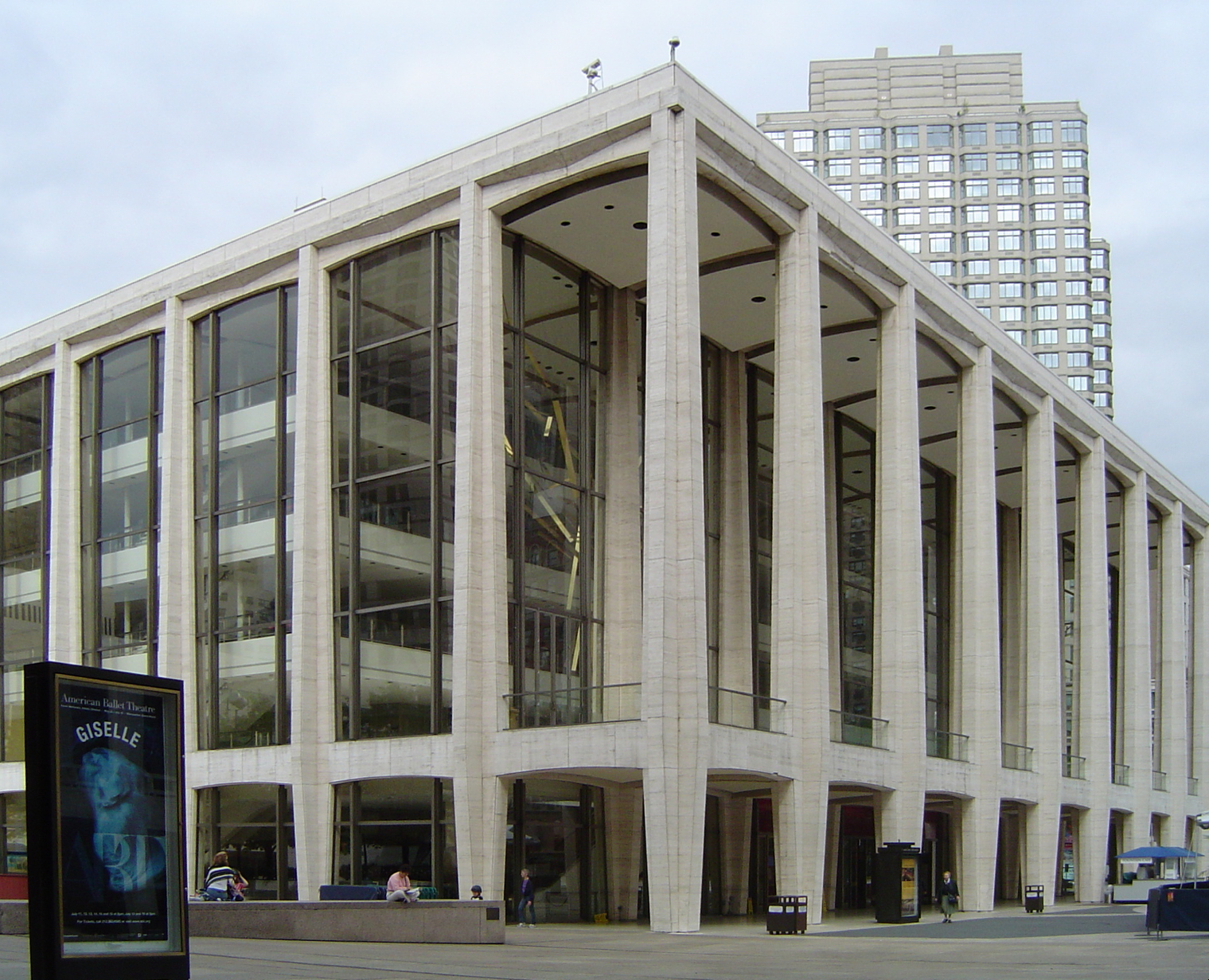
Philharmonic Hall, Lincoln Center, where Chávez's Sixth Symphony was premiered in 1964

Symphony No. 6 is an orchestral work by Carlos Chávez, composed in 1961–62.

The Sixth Symphony was commissioned by the New York Philharmonic in celebration of their 1962–63 opening season in Lincoln Center for the Performing Arts. Composition was completed in 1962 and a date was scheduled for the symphony's premiere in the spring of 1963, but Chávez continued revisions to the score and the date had to be postponed.

It was finally premiered in New York on 7 May 1964 in Philharmonic Hall, Lincoln Center, by Leonard Bernstein and the New York Philharmonic, to whom the score is dedicated.

== Instrumentation ==
The symphony is scored for piccolo, two flutes, two oboes, cor anglais, two clarinets, two bassoons, contrabassoon, four horns, two trumpets, two trombones, bass trombone, tuba, timpani, percussion (two players), and strings.

== Analysis ==
The work is in three movements:

1. Allegro energico
2. Adagio molto cantabile
3. Con anima

Far from the experimental approaches Chávez adopted in his earlier symphonies, the Sixth accepts the classical forms. The first movement is a sonata-allegro, beginning with a C major theme recalling the symphonic style of the Romantic era. A bitonal transition leads to the second theme, in the dominant key of G major. After extensive development, the recapitulation is followed by a developmental coda, including a strict mirror canon on the first theme. The movement fades to nothing in a constant march in triplets.

The second movement functions as a short but intense interlude between the outer movements. It falls into two sections, the first beginning in the brass and woodwinds, finally giving way to the violins. This is followed, after a descending transitional passage in the low brass, by the second section, where the double basses present the theme that will form the basis of the finale. There is a suggestion of the contrapuntal atmosphere, and even an anticipation of the two counterthemes of the first variation of the following movement.

The symphony closes with a magisterial passacaglia. After the announcement of the bass ostinato in the tuba, there follow thirty-four variations, a fugue with two expositions, and then a further seven variations to conclude. The twenty-ninth variation evokes a Brahmsian sound as a culmination, reflecting the illustrious antecedent Chávez has accepted as his model, and the main theme from the first movement returns in the thirtieth. The last statement of the bass theme brings the movement to an imposing close in C major.

== Discography ==
- The Six Symphonies of Carlos Chávez . Orquesta Sinfónica Nacional de México; Carlos Chávez, cond. 3-LP set (stereo). CBS Masterworks 32 31 0002 (32 11 0020, 32 11 0022, 32 11 0024). New York: CBS, 1967.
- The Six Symphonies of Carlos Chávez. London Symphony Orchestra; Eduardo Mata, cond. 3-LP set (stereo). Vox Cum Laude 3D-VCL 9032. New York: Moss Music Group, 1983. Reissued on 2-CD set as Carlos Chávez: The Complete Symphonies. VoxBox2 CDX 5061. Hauppauge, NY: Moss Music Group, 1992.
