= Please Don't Ask About Barbara =

Single by Bobby Vee

from the album A Bobby Vee Recording Session
- B-side: "I Can't Say Goodbye"
- Released: February 1962
- Genre: Pop
- Length: 2:03
- Label: Liberty
- Songwriters: Bill Buchanan, Jack Keller
- Producer: Snuff Garrett

Bobby Vee singles chronology
| "Run to Him" (1961) | "Please Don't Ask About Barbara" (1962) | "Sharing You" (1962) |

"Please Don't Ask About Barbara" is a song written by Bill Buchanan and Jack Keller. The song was produced by Snuff Garrett, and performed by Bobby Vee. It reached No. 15 on the Billboard Hot 100, No. 2 in Canada, and No. 29 in the UK in 1962. It was featured on his 1962 album, A Bobby Vee Recording Session.

The single's B-side, "I Can't Say Goodbye", reached No. 92 on the Billboard chart.

"Go Away Little Girl" was a hit for Steve Lawrence on Columbia Records in late 1962, however the original was recorded by Bobby Vee at United Recording Studio on March 28, 1962.
