= No One Can Make My Sunshine Smile =

Single by The Everly Brothers
- A-side: "Don't Ask Me to Be Friends"
- Released: October 1962
- Genre: Rock and roll
- Length: 2:06
- Label: Warner Bros. 5297
- Songwriters: Gerry Goffin, Jack Keller

The Everly Brothers singles chronology
"I'm Here to Get My Baby Out of Jail" (1962)	"No One Can Make My Sunshine Smile" (1962)	"Nancy's Minuet" (February 22, 1963)

"No One Can Make My Sunshine Smile" is a song written by Gerry Goffin and Jack Keller and performed by The Everly Brothers. In 1962, the track reached No. 11 on the UK Singles Chart and No. 117 on the U.S. pop chart.

== Later versions ==
- Just Us, 1973
- Bobby Vee, 2011
- Albert Lee & Hogan's Heroes, 2014
