= A Forever Kind of Love =

1962 single by Bobby Vee

Single by Bobby Vee

from the album A Bobby Vee Recording Session
- B-side: "Remember Me, Huh?"
- Released: September 1962
- Genre: Pop
- Length: 2:23
- Label: Liberty
- Songwriters: Gerry Goffin, Jack Keller
- Producer: Snuff Garrett

Bobby Vee singles chronology
"Punish Her" (1962)	"A Forever Kind of Love" (1962)	"The Night Has a Thousand Eyes" (1962)

"A Forever Kind of Love" is a song written by Gerry Goffin and Jack Keller and recorded by Bobby Vee. Bobby recorded 2 different versions of the song, the first at Abbey Rd in the UK in February 1962 with backing vocals by the Mike Sammes Singers. That version was produced by Snuff Garrett and arranged by Norrie Paramor and released as a single only in the UK and Australia. It reached #13 in the United Kingdom in 1962. On return to the US, Vee recorded another version of the song on March 27, 1962 at the same session as "Sharing You" at United Recording Studios in LA. It was produced by Snuff Garrett and arranged by Ernie Freeman, however the new recording lacked the sparkle of the earlier UK version and was issued only on his 1962 album, A Bobby Vee Recording Session.

The song was produced by Snuff Garrett and arranged by Norrie Paramor.

== Other versions ==
- Cliff Richard and the Shadows released a version on an EP in September 1964 in the United Kingdom.
