= Billy Fury discography =

- Studio albums: 6
- EPs: 11
- Soundtrack albums: 1
- Live albums: 2
- Compilation albums: 36+
- Singles: 49

This is the discography of English rock and roll singer Billy Fury.

== Albums ==
=== Studio albums ===
Year	Title	Details	Peak chart positions
Year	Title	Details	UK
1960	The Sound of Fury	Released: 21 May 1960; Label: Decca; With the Four Jays	18
1961	Halfway to Paradise	Released: September 1961; Label: Ace of Clubs	5
1963	Billy	Released: April 1963; Label: Decca	6
1979	The Golden Years	Released: February 1979; Label: K-tel; Collection of re-recorded hits	—
1983	The One and Only	Released: March 1983; Label: Polydor	56
1983	Memories	Released: June 1983; Label: K-tel; Collection of re-recorded hits	—
"—" denotes releases that did not chart.

=== Live albums ===
Year	Title	Details	Peak chart positions
Year	Title	Details	UK
1963	We Want Billy!	Released: October 1963; Label: Decca; With the Tornados	14
2003	The Last Concert	Released: June 2003; Label: Ozit-Morpheus	—
"—" denotes releases that did not chart.

=== Soundtrack albums ===
Year	Title	Details
1965	I've Gotta Horse	Released: March 1965; Label: Decca; Soundtrack to the film of the same name in which Fury also stars

=== Compilation albums ===
Year	Title	Details	Peak chart positions
Year	Title	Details	UK
1960	Billy Fury	Released: November 1960; Label: Ace of Clubs; Collates Fury's previously released singles	—
1967	Best of Billy Fury	Released: March 1967; Label: Ace of Clubs	—
1971	The World of Billy Fury	Released: February 1972; Label: Decca	—
1977	The Billy Fury Story	Released: February 1977; Label: Decca	—
1980	The World of Billy Fury Vol. 2	Released: March 1980; Label: Decca	—
1982	The Billy Fury Hit Parade	Released: February 1982; Label: Virgin	49
1983	The Missing Years: 1967–1980	Released: November 1983; Label: Red Bus	—
1984	Loving You	Released: May 1984; Label: Magnum Force	—
1984	The Other Side of Billy Fury	Released: November 1984; Label: See for Miles	—
1985	Sticks 'n' Stones	Released: March 1985; Label: Magnum Force	—
1985	The E.P. Collection	Released: September 1985; Label: See for Miles	—
1987	The Collection	Released: April 1987; Label: Castle Communications	—
1988	The Very Best of Billy Fury	Released: 1988; Label: Prism Leisure	—
1991	Rough Diamonds and Pure Gems	Released: April 1991; Label: The Magnum Music Group	—
1989	In Thoughts of You: The Best of Billy Fury	Released: May 1991; Label: Pickwick Music	—
1993	Paradise	Released: May 1993; Label: Spectrum Music	—
1997	The Very Best of Billy Fury	Released: September 1997; Label: Summit	—
1998	The 40th Anniversary Anthology	Released: 16 November 1998; Label: Deram	—
2001	The Best Of	Released: October 2001; Label: Decca	—
2002	Love Songs	Released: September 2002; Label: Decca	—
2005	The Rocker	Released: March 2005; Label: Decca/Spectrum Music	—
2005	The Sound of Fury: Radio Luxembourg Sessions	Released: November 2005; Label: Castle Music; Credited with the Tornados	—
2006	Live at the BBC	Released: 18 September 2006; Label: Decca	—
2008	His Wondrous Story: The Complete Collection	Released: 28 January 2008; Label: Universal Music TV	10
2008	Classics and Collectables	Released: November 2008; Label: Decca	—
2010	The Complete Parlophone Singles	Released: June 2010; Label: Peaksoft	—
2011	Turn My Back on You	Released: 8 February 2011; Label: Snapper Music	—
2011	Maybe Tomorrow: The Billy Fury Story 1958–60	Released: 21 February 2011; Label: Jasmine	—
2011	The Sound and the Fury	Released: 2011; Label: Great Voices of the Century	—
2012	The Very Best of Billy Fury	Released: January 2012; Label: One Day Music	—
2014	A Thousand Stars: The Best Of	Released: 17 February 2014; Label: Spectrum Music	—
2015	Last Night Was Made for Love: The Singles Collection 1959–1962	Released: 20 April 2015; Label: Jasmine	—
2016	The Absolutely Essential	Released: 25 March 2016; Label: Big3	—
2018	The Symphonic Sound of Fury	Released: 10 August 2018; Label: Decca 90	53
2019	Three Classic Albums Plus...	Released: 17 June 2019; Label: Avid Entertainment	—
2021	Three Saturdays with Billy	Released: 12 April 2021; Label: Top Sounds	—
"—" denotes releases that did not chart.

== EPs ==
Year	Title (Note: This is a list of EPs released in the UK. Various other EPs were released elsewhere, in particular in France and Spain.)	Details	Peak chart positions
Year	Title	Details	UK
1959	Maybe Tomorrow	Released: 19 June 1959; Label: Decca	—
1961	Billy Fury	Released: 1 December 1961; Label: Decca	—
1962	Billy Fury No. 2	Released: 19 January 1962; Label: Decca	—
1962	Play It Cool	Released: 25 May 1962; Label: Decca; Music from the film of the same name	2
1962	Billy Fury Hits	Released: 29 October 1962; Label: Decca	8
1963	Billy Fury and the Tornados	Released: 29 April 1963; Label: Decca; With the Tornados	2
1963	Am I Blue	Released: 13 December 1963; Label: Decca	—
1965	Billy Fury & the Gamblers	Released: 26 November 1965; Label: Decca; With the Gamblers	—
1983	Single Heroes	Released: March 1983; Label: Dakota; Split EP with Malcolm Roberts and Dave Berry	130
1983	My Christmas Prayer	Released: 25 November 1983; Label: Decca	111
1985	Suzanne in the Mirror	Released: July 1985; Label: Magnum Force	—
"—" denotes releases that did not chart.

== Singles ==
Year	Title	Peak chart positions		Album	Label
Year	Title	UK	IRE	Album	Label
1959	"Maybe Tomorrow" b/w "Gonna Type a Letter"	18	—	Billy Fury	Decca
1959	"Margo" b/w "Don't Knock Upon My Door"	28	—	Billy Fury	Decca
1959	"Angel Face" b/w "Time Has Come"	—	—	Billy Fury	Decca
1959	"My Christmas Prayer" b/w "Last Kiss"	—	—	Non-album single Billy Fury	Decca
1960	"Colette" b/w "Baby How I Cried"	9	—	Billy Fury	Decca
1960	"That's Love" (with the Four Jays) b/w "You Don't Know"	19	—	The Sound of Fury	Decca
1960	"Wondrous Place" b/w "Alright, Goodbye"	25	—	Billy Fury The Sound of Fury	Decca
1960	"A Thousand Stars" b/w "Push Push"	14	—	Halfway to Paradise	Decca
1961	"Don't Worry" (with the Four Kestrels) b/w "Talkin' in My Sleep"	40	—	Halfway to Paradise	Decca
1961	"Halfway to Paradise" b/w "Cross My Heart"	3	4	Halfway to Paradise	Decca
1961	"Jealousy" b/w "Open Your Arms"	2	1	Non-album singles	Decca
1961	"I'd Never Find Another You" b/w "Sleepless Nights"	5	3	Non-album singles	Decca
1962	"Letter Full of Tears" b/w "Magic Eyes"	32	—	Non-album singles	Decca
1962	"Last Night Was Made for Love" b/w "A King for Tonight"	4	6	Non-album singles	Decca
1962	"Once Upon a Dream" b/w "If I Lose You"	7	—	Non-album singles	Decca
1962	"Because of Love" b/w "Running Around"	18	—	Non-album singles	Decca
1963	"Like I've Never Been Gone" b/w "What Do You Think You're Doing Of"	3	5	Non-album singles	Decca
1963	"When Will You Say I Love You" b/w "All I Wanna Do Is Cry"	3	4	Non-album singles	Decca
1963	"In Summer" b/w "I'll Never Fall in Love Again"	5	4	Non-album singles	Decca
1963	"Somebody Else's Girl" b/w "Go Ahead and Ask Her"	18	—	Non-album singles	Decca
1963	"Do You Really Love Me Too (Fool's Errand)" b/w "What Am I Gonna Do"	13	—	Non-album singles	Decca
1964	"I Will" b/w "Nothin' Shakin' (But the Leaves on the Trees)"	14	—	Non-album singles	Decca
1964	"It's Only Make Believe" b/w "Baby What You Want Me to Do"	10	7	Non-album singles	Decca
1964	"The Hippy Hippy Shake" (with the Gamblers; export-only release) b/w "Glad All Over"	—	—	Non-album singles	Decca
1965	"I'm Lost Without You" b/w "You Better Believe It Baby"	16	—	Non-album singles	Decca
1965	"In Thoughts of You" b/w "Away from You"	9	—	Non-album singles	Decca
1965	"Run to My Lovin' Arms" b/w "Where Do You Run"	25	—	Non-album singles	Decca
1966	"I'll Never Quite Get Over You" b/w "I Belong to the Wind"	35	—	Non-album singles	Decca
1966	"Don't Let a Little Pride (Stand in Your Way)" b/w "Didn't See the Real Thing Come Along"	51 (Note: Chart position is from the official UK "Breakers List".)	—	Non-album singles	Decca
1966	"Give Me Your Word" b/w "She's So Far Out She's In"	27	—	Non-album singles	Decca
1967	"Hurtin' Is Loving" b/w "Things Are Changing"	56	—	Non-album singles	Parlophone
1967	"Loving You" b/w "I'll Go Along with It"	—	—	Non-album singles	Parlophone
1967	"Suzanne in the Mirror" b/w "It Just Don't Matter Now"	—	—	Non-album singles	Parlophone
1968	"Beyond the Shadow of a Doubt" b/w "Baby Do You Love Me?"	—	—	Non-album singles	Parlophone
1968	"Silly Boy Blue" b/w "One Minute Woman"	—	—	Non-album singles	Parlophone
1968	"Phone Box (The Monkey's in the Jam Jar)" b/w "Any Morning Now"	—	—	Non-album singles	Parlophone
1968	"Lady" b/w "Certain Things"	—	—	Non-album singles	Parlophone
1969	"I Call for My Rose" b/w "Bye Bye"	—	—	Non-album singles	Parlophone
1969	"All the Way to the U.S.A." b/w "Do My Best for You"	—	—	Non-album singles	Parlophone
1970	"Why Are You Leaving?" b/w "Old Sweet Roll (Hi-De-Ho)"	—	—	Non-album singles	Parlophone
1970	"Paradise Alley" b/w "Well...Alright"	—	—	Non-album singles	Parlophone
1972	"Will the Real Man Please Stand Up" b/w "At This Stage"	—	—	Non-album singles	Fury
1974	"I'll Be Your Sweetheart" b/w "Fascinating Candle Flame"	—	—	Non-album singles	Warner Bros.
1981	"Be Mine Tonight" b/w "No Trespassers"	—	—	The One and Only	Polydor
1982	"Love or Money" b/w "Love Sweet Love"	57	—	The One and Only	Polydor
1982	"Devil or Angel" b/w "Don't Tell Me Lies"	58	—	The One and Only	Polydor
1983	"Let Me Go Lover" (withdrawn from release) b/w "Your Words"	—	—	The One and Only Non-album track	Polydor
1983	"Forget Him" b/w "Your Words"	59	—	Non-album singles	Polydor
1999	"Wondrous Place" (re-release) b/w "It's Only Make Believe"/"Last Night Was Made for Love"	83 (Note: Reissued after use in a Toyota Yaris advert. Deram Records also released a version which peaked at number 98 in the same week as the K-tel version.)	—	Non-album singles	K-tel
"—" denotes releases that did not chart or were not released in that territory.
