= We Want Billy! =

Live album by Billy Fury
- Released: October 1963
- Recorded: 1963
- Genre: Rock and roll
- Label: Decca LK4548 (mono), SLK4548 (stereo)
- Producer: Ivor Raymonde; Mike Smith

Billy Fury chronology
Billy (1963)	We Want Billy! (1963)	I've Gotta Horse (1965)

Professional ratings
Review scores
Source	Rating
New Record Mirror	5/5 stars

We Want Billy! is a live album by Billy Fury, recorded in 1963, and backed by The Tornados. It was recorded in Decca's Studio No. 3.

== Track listing ==
Side 1

1. "Sweet Little Sixteen"
2. "Baby Come On"
3. "That's All Right"
4. "Wedding Bells"
5. "Sticks and Stones"
6. "Unchain My Heart"
7. "I'm Moving On"

Side 2

1. "Just Because"
2. "Halfway to Paradise"
3. "I'd Never Find Another You"
4. "Once Upon a Dream"
5. "Last Night Was Made for Love"
6. "Like I've Never Been Gone"
7. "When Will You Say I Love You"
