= Dreamboats and Petticoats (compilation album) =

Compilation album by Various artists
- Released: 5 November 2007
- Genre: Rock and roll

Dreamboats and Petticoats is a 2007 compilation album composed of songs from the 1950s and early 1960s. The compilation remained on the UK Top 40 Compilation Chart for a total of 157 weeks. Its success led to a series of six similarly themed follow-up compilation albums being released. The series also includes a "Summer Holidays" album (which includes the Cliff Richard and the Shadows song after which it is named), a Christmas album, and a "Best of Del Shannon" album called Runaway.

== Track listing of the original compilation album ==
=== Disc 1 ===
1. Marty Wilde - Teenager in Love
2. John Leyton - Johnny Remember Me
3. Billy Fury - Halfway to Paradise
4. Buddy Holly - Heartbeat
5. Roy Orbison - Only the Lonely
6. Johnnie Ray - Just Walking in the Rain
7. Mike Sarne & Wendy Richard - Come Outside
8. Craig Douglas - Only 16
9. Joe Brown - That's What Love Will Do
10. The Big Bopper - Chantilly Lace
11. Mark Wynter - Go Away Little Girl
12. The Platters - Smoke Gets in Your Eyes
13. The Allisons - Are You Sure?
14. The Everly Brothers - All I Have to Do Is Dream
15. Skeeter Davis - The End of the World
16. Brenda Lee - All Alone Am I
17. The Marcels - Blue Moon
18. Chuck Berry - Sweet Little Sixteen
19. Kenny Lynch - Up on the Roof
20. Bobby Vee - Take Good Care of My Baby
21. Terry Dene - A White Sport Coat
22. Johnny Burnette - You're Sixteen
23. Connie Francis - Lipstick on Your Collar
24. Kathy Kirby - Secret Love
25. Bobby Darin- Dream Lover
26. The Cascades - Rhythm of the Rain

=== Disc 2 ===
1. Bill Haley And His Comets - Rock Around the Clock
2. Cliff Richard - Move It
3. Adam Faith - What Do You Want
4. Buddy Holly - It Doesn't Matter Anymore
5. Joe Brown - Picture of You
6. Mark Wynter - Venus in Blue Jeans
7. Chuck Berry - You Never Can Tell
8. Bobby Vee - Rubber Ball
9. Susan Maughan - Bobby's Girl
10. Lonnie Donegan - Rock Island Line
11. Dion DiMucci - Runaround Sue
12. Gene Vincent And His Blue Caps - Be Bop A Lula
13. Del Shannon - Runaway
14. Little Eva - The Loco-Motion
15. Helen Shapiro - Walking Back to Happiness
16. Pat Boone - Love Letters in the Sand
17. John Leyton - Wild Wind
18. Del Shannon - Little Town Flirt
19. Billy Fury - Like I've Never Been Gone
20. Heinz - Just Like Eddie
21. Eddie Cochran - Three Steps to Heaven
22. Neil Sedaka - Oh! Carol
23. Bobby Vinton - Blue Velvet
24. Duane Eddy & the Rebels - Because They're Young
25. The Tornados - Telstar
26. The Shadows - "Wonderful Land"

== Sales ==
Region	Certification	Certified units/sales
United Kingdom	—	677,000
