= Because of Love (disambiguation) =

"Because of Love" is a 1993 song by Janet Jackson. It may also refer to:

- "Because of Love" (Elvis Presley song), 1962 song by Elvis Presley
  - "Because of Love", a 1962 single by Billy Fury, recorded later, but released first
- "Because of Love", a 2008 song from My Friend (SG Wannabe album)
- "Because of Love", a 2011 song by Han Seung-yeon for the Korean television series, Warrior Baek Dong-soo
- Dahil Sa Pag-ibig, a 2012 Philippine television series, also called Because of Love in English
