= Elaine Murtagh =

Irish singer and songwriter (1940–2026)

Elaine Patricia Mary Murtagh (born Ellien Murtagh; 1940 – 18 January 2026) was an Irish singer and songwriter who was a member of the Avons, a pop vocal group popular in the 1950s and early 1960s.

== Background ==
Ellien Patricia Mary Murtagh was born in County Cork, Ireland in 1940. She died in hospital on 18 January 2026.

== Career ==
Murtagh was a member of the Avons with her sister-in-law, Valerie Murtagh. Towards the end of her singing career she moved into songwriting; the best known of her songs is "Dance On!", a hit record for both the Shadows in 1962 and Kathy Kirby in 1963, which she wrote with Valerie and Ray Adams. She also wrote "In Summer", a number 5 hit for Billy Fury in 1963, as well as songs recorded by Petula Clark and Tom Jones. She married Ray Adams in 1964.

She formed the Elaine Avon Artiste Management & Agency in 1984; it specialised in providing performers for luxury cruise lines.
