= The Avons =

British pop vocal group

The Avons were a British pop vocal group. Originally composed of Valerie Murtagh (born 1936, Willesden, London) and Elaine Murtagh, (born 1940, County Cork, Ireland) and known as 'The Avon Sisters', they added Raymond S. Adams (born 1938, Jersey, Channel Islands), and changed their name to 'The Avons'.

== Career ==
=== Early days ===
The two sisters-in-law Valerie and Elaine (sometimes known as Eileen) Murtagh, performed as 'The Avon Sisters' at the 1958 BBC Radio Exhibition, in the Olympia Exhibition Halls, Earls Court, London. There they were heard by Norrie Paramor, who signed them to the UK's Columbia label.

Their first recording was with The Mudlarks on the B-side of their 1958 single "My Grandfather Clock", a cover of "Which Witch Doctor". Following this, they added Ray Adams from Nat Gonella's band, and changed their name to 'The Avons'.

=== "Seven Little Girls" ===
The Avons' first single release in 1959 was a cover version of "Seven Little Girls (Sitting in the Back Seat)", written by Bob Hilliard and Lee Pockriss. The record reached number 3 in the UK Singles Chart, and stayed on the chart for thirteen weeks.

=== Later career ===
The Avons had three other chart entries in the Top 50 up to 1961, but never achieved the same success as their first record. The charting follow-ups were "We're Only Young Once", "Four Little Heels", and another cover, of Bobby Vee's "Rubber Ball". The Avons were approached to perform the song "Pickin' Petals" in the UK heat of the 1960 Eurovision Song Contest, but their participation was cancelled due to a European Broadcasting Union rule that stated that trios could not compete.

Their song "Dance On!" (1963) was recorded as an instrumental by The Shadows. A vocal version was recorded by Kathy Kirby the next year. They also wrote "In Summer", a number 5 UK hit for Billy Fury in 1963.

Between 1963 and 1964, the group also recorded for the Decca and Fontana labels, without achieving any more hits. Valerie Murtagh became a successful songwriter, and remained involved with the British music industry. With her songwriting partner, Harold Spiro, she wrote (under the name "Valerie Avon") the UK entry to the Eurovision Song Contest 1974, "Long Live Love", performed by Olivia Newton-John.

== Groups with the same name ==
1. An American 1950s doo-wop group whose biggest hit in 1957 was entitled "Baby".
2. A trio from Nashville, Tennessee; Paula Hester, Beverly Bard and Fran Bard. They recorded several Northern soul tracks, starting out on RCA's Groove label in 1963, releasing the single "Push a Little Harder" b/w "Oh, Gee Baby!". They moved to Sound Stage 7 in 1966, and then to Excello in 1967, releasing their last single on Ref-o-Ree in 1968.

== See also ==
- List of doo-wop musicians
