= Valerie Murtagh =

English singer and songwriter

- Also known as: Valerie Avon
- Born: Patricia Valerie Jenkins; 1936 (age 89–90); Willesden, London, England
- Genre: Pop music
- Occupations: Singer, songwriter
- Instrument: Vocals
- Years active: 1950s–1970s

Valerie Murtagh (born Patricia Valerie Jenkins, 1936) also known under the pseudonym Valerie Avon, is an English singer and songwriter, who was a member of The Avons.

== Early life ==
Murtagh was born in Willesden, London, England, in 1936.

== Career ==
After singing with the Avons vocal trio between 1958 and 1964, alongside her husband's sister Elaine Murtagh and Elaine's husband Ray Adams, Murtagh became a songwriter under the name Valerie Avon. Together with Adams and Elaine Murtagh, she wrote "Dance On!". Recorded by the Shadows, this was a UK number one hit in 1963, and the year later returned to the UK Singles Chart in a vocal version by Kathy Kirby with lyrics by Marcel Stellman, which reached number eleven.

With her songwriting partner, Harold Spiro, she later wrote "Long Live Love", which was performed by Olivia Newton-John, the UK entry to the Eurovision Song Contest 1974.

She also co-wrote the following songs:

- "In Summer" (Billy Fury) – Ray Adams, Valerie Avon and Elaine Murtagh
- "Don't Move Away" (Cliff Richard) – Valerie Avon, Harold Spiro
- "Annabella Umbrella" (Cliff Richard) – Valerie Avon, Neilburg, Harold Spiro
- "Easy Lovin', Easy Livin'" (Georgie Fame) – Valerie Avon, Harold Spiro
- "Easy Loving" (The Troggs) – Valerie Avon, Harold Spiro
- "Desdemona" (The Searchers) – Valerie Avon, Harold Spiro -- U.S. No. 94
- "I'm Gonna Find Myself A Girl" (Gene Pitney) – Ray Adams, Valerie Avon and Elaine Adams (Elaine Murtagh)

== See also ==
- United Kingdom in the Eurovision Song Contest
