= Playbox =

Playbox may refer to:

- Playbox (1980s TV series), a children television programme that ran on ITV in the United Kingdom during the late 1980s
- Playbox (1950s TV series), a children television programme that ran on BBC in the United Kingdom from 1955 to 1964
- the Playbox Theatre, a former theatre in Melbourne, Australia
- the Playbox Theatre Company, a theatre company from Melbourne, Australia (formerly resident at the Playbox Theatre) known since the mid-2000s as the Malthouse Theatre
