= Amanda Barrie =

English actress (born 1935)

- Born: Shirley Anne Broadbent; 14 September 1935 (age 91); Ashton-under-Lyne, Lancashire, England
- Occupation: Actress
- Years active: 1938–present
- Television: Coronation Street (1981–1982, 1988–2001); Bad Girls (2003–2006)
- Spouses: Robin Hunter (m. 1967; died 2004) Hilary Bonner (m. 2014)
- Website: amandabarrie.co.uk

Amanda Barrie (born Shirley Anne Broadbent; 14 September 1935) is an English actress. She appeared in two of the Carry On films before being cast as Alma Halliwell in the ITV soap opera Coronation Street, a role she played on and off for 20 years. Between 2003 and 2006, she played the role of Bev Tull in the ITV prison drama, Bad Girls. Barrie has since enjoyed a varied stage and television career.

== Early life and education ==
Barrie was born Shirley Anne Broadbent in Ashton-under-Lyne, Lancashire, to Herbert Broadbent and his wife Connie (née Pike). She attended St Anne's College, an independent school at Lytham St Annes, then trained at the Arts Educational Schools in London and later at Bristol Old Vic Theatre School.

== Career ==
Barrie appeared in pantomime as a child and was a dancer before working for many years as a chorus girl in the West End until her first break as an actress came along. At sixteen she danced at the Windsor Club with Danny La Rue and Barbara Windsor, changing her name before making her West End debut in 1961's Babes in the Wood. Throughout the 1960s, Barrie worked on many stage productions including Cabaret, Private Lives, Hobson's Choice and Aladdin.

Barrie made her screen debut in the comedy film Operation Bullshine in 1959, leading to roles in films including What a Whopper and Doctor in Distress. Barrie then starred in two of the Carry On films, a long-running series of British comedy films: she had a supporting part as a cab driver in Carry On Cabby (1963) and took the title role in Carry On Cleo (1964).

In 1965, Barrie starred alongside Billy Fury in his film I've Gotta Horse. Barrie continued to appear in many television series into the 1970s as well as presenting Hickory House with former Coronation Street star Alan Rothwell between 1973 and 1977. In 1975, Barrie played Mrs. B.J. Spence in the Walt Disney film One of Our Dinosaurs Is Missing. After roles in a string of one-off television plays and series, she appeared in a guest role as a ballet mistress in the BBC comedy series Are You Being Served? in 1979. In 1982, she starred alongside Brian Murphy in L for Lester, a sitcom about a driving instructor.

Barrie is well known for playing Alma Sedgewick (later Baldwin), in Coronation Street. She was a bit-player in the early to mid-1980s, before she was offered a contract in 1988, after which her character became high-profile. (By coincidence, in 1966 she had appeared in Pardon the Expression, a spin-off of Coronation Street). She continued in the role until her departure in 2001. In the story, Alma was diagnosed with cervical cancer, which later caused her death.

Since leaving Coronation Street, Barrie has continued to act, firstly as Margo Phillips in the BBC medical soap opera Doctors for nine episodes, and in the ITV1 prison series Bad Girls, playing inmate Bev Tull from the fifth series to the last, along with Phyl Oswyn played by Stephanie Beacham. The characters together were known as "The Costa Cons".

She also became one of the celebrities who took part in Hell's Kitchen and attempted to slap Gordon Ramsay in the face. In 2004, she published her autobiography, It's Not A Rehearsal. In 2005 she appeared as the Wicked Witch of the West in a pantomime adaptation of The Wizard of Oz in Oxford. She took part in a pantomime edition of The Weakest Link, dressed as the witch to raise money for charity but she was voted off in the second round. From November 2006 to January 2007, Barrie took a starring role in the pantomime adaptation of Jack and the Beanstalk in Canterbury. From December 2007 to January 2008, she appeared as the Fairy Godmother in the pantomime adaptation of Cinderella at the Gordon Craig Theatre in Stevenage, Hertfordshire. From December 2008 to January 2009, she played the Fairy Godmother in Cinderella at the Grand Theatre, Blackpool. She again played the role from December 2009 to January 2010 in Rhyl. In December 2010 and January 2011 she played the role in Bournemouth. She played the role again from December 2011 to January 2012 in Worthing. On Tuesday 7 August 2012 she appeared in the BBC drama Holby City as actress Annabella Casey. She again played the Fairy Godmother in Cinderella at the Marina Theatre in Lowestoft from December 2013 to January 2014.

In June 2014, Barrie returned to the set of Coronation Street for a 30-minute documentary entitled Gail & Me: 40 Years on Coronation Street, and was reunited with former co-stars and friends. From 2015 to 2017, Barrie had a recurring role as a fortune teller nicknamed Psychic Sue in the sitcom Benidorm. In 2015, she starred in the film Tea for Two alongside John Challis as a couple who run a tea room, before having a role in the 2018 drama film Together with Sylvia Syms and Peter Bowles. In January 2018, Barrie took part in Celebrity Big Brother.

In the summer of 2019, Barrie appeared in series 2 of Celebrity 5 Go Barging, exploring canals around Staffordshire and Warwickshire by narrowboat. In September 2025, Barrie published her second autobiography, I'm Still Here.

== Personal life ==
Barrie had a relationship with singer Billy Fury in the mid-1960s after they met while filming I've Gotta Horse. Fury proposed to her, but she did not accept.

In 1967, Barrie married theatre director and actor Robin Hunter. They separated in the mid-1980s, but never divorced; he died in 2004. The couple had no children. She came out as bisexual in her autobiography It's Not a Rehearsal. On 12 September 2014, she married her long-term partner Hilary Bonner. The couple live in homes in Somerset's Blackdown Hills and in London.

Barrie is a distant cousin of Coronation Street co-star Sally Ann Matthews, who plays Jenny Bradley.

== Stage and screen credits ==
=== Film ===
Year	Title	Role	Notes
1955	Value for Money	Dancer	Uncredited
1959	Operation Bullshine	A.T.S. Girl	Minor role
1961	Don't Bother to Knock	American Girl	Minor role
1961	What a Whopper	Chelsea Girl	Uncredited
1962	A Pair of Briefs	Exotic Snake Dancer	Minor role
1963	Doctor in Distress	Rona	Supporting role
1963	Carry On Cabby	Anthea	Main role
1964	Carry On Cleo	Cleopatra	Main role
1965	I've Gotta Horse	Jo	Main role
1968	Koroshi	Rosemary	Main role
1975	One of Our Dinosaurs Is Missing	Mrs. B.J. Spence	Supporting role
1979	Quadrophenia	Mother	Scene cut
2015	Tea for Two	Alice	Short film
2018	Together	Margaret	Supporting role

=== Television ===
Year	Title	Role	Notes
1954	Running Wild	(unknown)	6 episodes
1957	This Is the Henry Hall Show	Dancer	5 episodes
1959	Set to Music	Dancer	Television film
1960	ITV Play of the Week	Flora	Episode: "The Two Bouquets"
1961	The Seven Faces of Jim	Muriel	Episode: "The Face of Dedication"
1961	The Seven Faces of Jim	Maudie Glover	Episode: "The Face of Enthusiasm"
1962	Playbox	Margaret Palethorpe	Episodes: #7.8 and #7.12
1962	Compact	Marilyn Wayne	Episode: "Musical Evening"
1962	Bulldog Breed	Sandra Prentiss	All 7 episodes
1963	ITV Television Playhouse	Cigarette Girl	Episode: "Adam's Apple"
1963	Playbox	Gloria Green	Episode: #8.10
1963	Jezebel ex UK	Jackie	Episode: "Sanderson and the Sea"
1963	More Faces of Jim	Velvet O'Toole	Episode: "A Matter of Upbringing"
1964–1965	It's Tarbuck	Various	6 episodes
1966	Pardon the Expression	Judy Best	Episode: "Whose Baby are You?"
1966	Comedy Playhouse	Geraldine Woods	Episode: "The Reluctant Romeo"
1966	The Wednesday Play	Jada	Episode: "A Tale of Two Wives"
1967	Danger Man	Rosemary	Episode: "Koroshi"
1967	Sanctuary	(unknown)	Episode: "The Mission"
1967	The Reluctant Romeo	Geraldine Woods	All 7 episodes
1968	ITV Playhouse	Mavis Pritchard	Episode: "Horizontal Hold"
1968	Ooh La La!	Pepita Lambelle	6 episodes (series 1)
1969	Thirty-Minute Theatre	Janet	4 episodes
1971	The Mind of Mr. J.G. Reeder	Ethel Gibson	Episode: "Death of an Angel"
1971	BBC Play of the Month	Hermia	Episode: "A Midsummer Night's Dream"
1973	Ooh La La!	Pepita Lambelle	Episode: "Paying the Piper"
1976	The Many Wives of Patrick	Amy	Episode: "Internal Disputes"
1976	Play for Today	Joyce	Episode: "Early Struggles"
1976	Play for Today	Anne	Episode: "Buffet"
1976	The Venetian Twins	(unknown)	Television film
1977	BBC Play of the Month	Mrs. Squeamish	Episode: "The Country Wife"
1977	Miss Jones and Son	Wanda	Episode: "Baby Talk"
1978	Strangers	Mrs. Parker	Episode: "Paying Guests"
1979	Are You Being Served?	Ballet Mistress	Episode: "Strong Stuff This Insurance"
1980	Time of My Life	Joan Archer	5 episodes
1980	Spooner's Patch	Spooner's Girlfriend	Episode: "Spooner's Patch Thatch"
1981–1982, 1988–2001	Coronation Street	Alma Baldwin	1,136 episodes
1982	L for Lester	Sally Small	All 6 episodes
2002	Dick Whittington	Queen of Tonga	Television film
2003–2004	Doctors	Margo Phillips	9 episodes
2003–2006	Bad Girls	Beverley Tull	41 episodes (series 5–8)
2012	Holby City	Annabella Casey	Episode: "Crimes and Misdemeanours"
2013	Doctors	Cath Horton	Episode: "In Good Health"
2015–2017	Benidorm	Psychic Sue	3 episodes
2017	Holby City	Jenny Cox	Episode: "Project Aurous"
2018	The Bar Mitzvah	Hillary	All 6 episodes
2018	Carol and Vinnie	(unknown)	Television film
2022–2023	Casualty	Elsie Clegg	4 episodes
2026	Amandaland	Amanda Barrie	Episode: "Comic Relief Special"

=== Stage ===
Year	Title	Role	Venue
1958–1959	Grab Me a Gondola		Bristol Hippodrome
1962	See You Inside		Various locations
1963–1964	Green Room Rag	Various	Adelphi Theatre
1963–1964	Six of One	Various	Adelphi Theatre
1964	She Loves Me	Ilona Ritter	Lyric Theatre, London
1964–1965	Little by Little		Little Theatre, Bristol
1965	The Beggar's Opera		Little Theatre, Bristol
1965	Hobson's Choice		Little Theatre, Bristol
1965	A Public Mischief	Bridget	Theatre Royal, Newcastle
1966	Any Wednesday	Ellen	Shaftesbury Theatre
1967–1968	Aladdin		Watford Palace Theatre
1968	Private Lives	Amanda Prynne	Watford Palace Theatre
1968	Lord Arthur Savile's Crime	Sybil Merton	Various locations
1969	A Talent to Amuse		Phoenix Theatre, London
1970	The Mating Game	Julia Carrington	Lyceum Theatre
1972	Come When You Like	Olive Ashton	Theatre Royal, Bath
1972	Who's Who?	Helen Brown	Yvonne Arnaud Theatre
1973	Oh, Kay!	Kay	Various locations
1974–1975	Absurd Person Singular	Marion	Vaudeville Theatre
1975–1976	A Touch of Spring	Alison Ames	Harold Pinter Theatre
1976–1977	The Wizard of Oz		Birmingham Repertory Theatre
1976–1978	Donkey's Years	Lady Driver	Various locations
1979	Ten Times Table	Helen	Yvonne Arnaud Theatre
1979	The French Have a Song for It	Various	Piccadilly Theatre
1979–1980	Aladdin	Aladdin	Churchill Theatre, Bromley
1983	The Golf Umbrella	Various	Ashcroft Theatre, Croydon
1984	Stepping Out	Mavis	Duke of York's Theatre, London
1984	Noises Off	Dotty Otley	Savoy Theatre
1984–1985	Cinderella	Fairy Godmother	Towngate Theatre
1985	The Cabinet Mole		Various locations
1987–1988	Aladdin	The Princess	Kings Theatre, Southsea
1988	Kindly Keep It Covered	Julia Dickerby	Various locations
1989	Star Quality	Nora Mitchell	Richmond Theatre (London)
2001–2002	Snow White and the Seven Dwarfs	Wicked Queen	Bradford Alhambra
2002–2003	Aladdin	The Genie	Birmingham Hippodrome
2006–2007	Jack and the Beanstalk	Spirit of the Beans	Marlowe Theatre, Canterbury
2007–2008	Cinderella	Fairy Godmother	Gordon Craig Theatre, Stevenage
2008–2009	Cinderella	Fairy Godmother	Grand Theatre, Blackpool
2009–2010	Cinderella	Fairy Godmother	Rhyll Pavilion
2010–2011	Cinderella	Fairy Godmother	Bournemouth Pavilion
2011–2012	Cinderella	Fairy Godmother	Connaught Theatre, Worthing
2012–2013	The Wizard of Oz	Wicked Witch of the West	New Theatre Oxford
2013–2014	Cinderella	Fairy Godmother	Marina Theatre, Lowestoft
2018–2019	Cinderella	Fairy Godmother	Marina Theatre, Lowestoft
2021–2022	Cinderella	Fairy Godmother	Queen's Theatre, Barnstaple
