= Maybe Tomorrow =

Maybe Tomorrow may refer to:

== Music ==
=== Albums ===
- Maybe Tomorrow (The Iveys album) or the title song (see below), 1969
- Maybe Tomorrow (The Jackson 5 album) or the title song (see below), 1971
- Maybe Tomorrow (Mike Tramp album) or the title song, 2017
- Maybe Tomorrow... by Low Roar, 2021

=== Songs ===
- "Maybe Tomorrow" (Billy Fury song), 1959
- "Maybe Tomorrow" (Goldenhorse song), 2003
- "Maybe Tomorrow" (The Iveys song), 1968
- "Maybe Tomorrow" (The Jackson 5 song), 1971
- "Maybe Tomorrow" (Stereophonics song), 2003
- "Maybe Tomorrow", by Chance Waters, 2012
- "Maybe Tomorrow", by the Chords from So Far Away, 1980
- "Maybe Tomorrow", by the Everly Brothers, B-side of "Wake Up Little Susie", 1957
- "Maybe Tomorrow", by the Four Tops from Magic, 1985
- "Maybe Tomorrow", by Heather Nova from The Jasmine Flower, 2008
- "Maybe Tomorrow", by Labi Siffre from Labi Siffre, 1970
- "Maybe Tomorrow", by Mesh STL, 2001
- "Maybe Tomorrow", by the Rembrandts from Untitled, 1992
- "Maybe Tomorrow", by Sixpence None the Richer from This Beautiful Mess, 1995
- "Maybe Tomorrow", by Terry Bush, the opening theme from the TV series The Littlest Hobo, 1979
- "Maybe Tomorrow", by Westlife from Face to Face, 2005
- "Maybe Tomorrow", by Day6, 2025

== Other uses ==
- Maybe Tomorrow (film), a 2012 American drama film
- Maybe Tomorrow, a 1973 Australian television film featuring Carole Skinner
- "Maybe Tomorrow" (True Detective), a 2015 TV episode
- Maybe Tomorrow, a 1977 poetry collection by Charles Bukowski
