= In Summer (Billy Fury song) =

1963 single by Billy Fury

Single by Billy Fury
- B-side: "I'll Never Fall in Love Again"
- Released: 12 July 1963
- Recorded: 6 June 1963
- Studio: Decca Studios, London
- Genre: Pop
- Length: 2:43
- Label: Decca
- Songwriter(s): Valerie Murtagh; Elaine Murtagh; Ray Adams
- Producer(s): Dick Rowe

Billy Fury singles chronology
"When Will You Say I Love You" (1963)	"In Summer" (1963)	"Somebody Else's Girl" (1963)

"In Summer" is a song by English singer Billy Fury, released as a single in July 1963. It peaked at number 5 on the Record Retailer Top 50.

== Release and reception ==
"In Summer" was written by pop vocal group the Avons' members Valerie Murtagh, Elaine Murtagh and Ray Adams for Fury. It was released with the B-side "I'll Never Fall in Love Again", written and first released in July 1959 by American singer Johnnie Ray.

Reviewing for Disc, Don Nicholl wrote: "A more lighthearted topside from Billy Fury as he sings the pleasant lilting ballad "In Summer". The sing has a simple appeal about it and Billy catches this without delving into his deeper beat voice". He described "I'll Never Fall in Love Again" as having "a more dramatic Latin pattern and Billy's mood is serious". In New Record Mirror: Fury "outlines the things he wants to do in summer – and it's a very, very commercial outline" and that "in parts, it doesn't sound much like Bill – but that's because it's so far away from the recent releases of his". The B-side was described as "much like the Fury of late. Warm, emotional, throbbing, dynamic".

== Track listing ==
7": Decca / F 11701

1. "In Summer" – 2:43
2. "I'll Never Fall in Love Again" – 2:13

== Charts ==
Chart (1963)	Peak position
Ireland (IRMA)	4
New Zealand (Lever Hit Parade)	7
UK Disc Top 30	5
UK Melody Maker Pop 50	6
UK New Musical Express Top 30	4
UK Record Retailer Top 50	5
