= The Reluctant Romeo =

British BBC TV sitcom 1966–67

- Genre: Comedy
- Starring: Amanda Barrie; Leslie Crowther
- Country of origin: United Kingdom
- Original language: English
- No. of series: 1
- No. of episodes: 8 (all missing)

Production
- Camera setup: Multi-camera
- Running time: 25 mins.

Original release
- Network: BBC1
- Release: 2 August 1966 – 3 July 1967

The Reluctant Romeo is a British television comedy series that was broadcast on the BBC in 1966 and 1967. It followed the Comedy Playhouse episode of the same name.

== Overview ==
The plot centres upon Geraldine Woods' (Amanda Barrie) obsession with an older working colleague, Thomas Jones (Leslie Crowther). Thomas Jones is already engaged to Sally Gardner (Margo Jenkins).

== Episode status ==
All eight episodes of the show are thought to have been wiped.
