= St Annes College Grammar School =

St Annes College

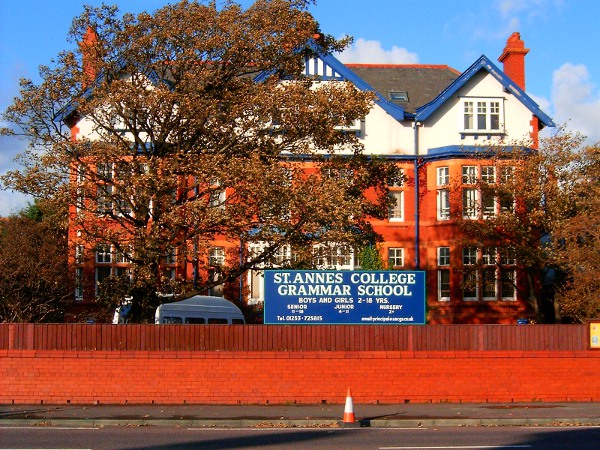

Location
- 293 Clifton Drive South; Lytham St Annes, Lancashire, FY8 1HN; England; 53.7486°N 3.0285°W

Information
- Type: Private day
- Motto: Vel Primus Vel Cum Primis (Either the first or with the first)
- Established: 1886; 140 years ago
- Local authority: Lancashire
- Department for Education URN: 119819 Tables
- Ofsted: Reports
- Principal: A V Welsby
- Staff: N/A
- Gender: Co-Educational
- Age: 2 to 19
- Enrolment: 77
- Website: www.sacgs.co.uk

St. Annes College Grammar School is a coeducational independent day school for pupils aged 2 to 18 years old in the town of Lytham St. Annes, Lancashire, England. The school is separated into a nursery, juniors and seniors school.

== History ==
The school was founded in Middlewich, Cheshire, about 1882 as St Anne's Ladies' College by the Misses Frances and Eliza Oldfield. It 1886 it moved to Newton Hall, and in 1888 moved some fifty miles to St Annes-on-the-Sea. In 1895, it was at Claremont, South Promenade, and in 1902 moved into a purpose-built red-brick building at 293 Clifton Drive South, St Annes, changing its name to St Annes College for Girls. The 1911 United Kingdom census shows that May Frances and Eliza Annie Oldfield were still then the joint headmistresses, and boarders came from across the country but most were from Lancashire, Cheshire, and Yorkshire. In its new home, the school operated continuously as a traditional independent boarding and day school for girls until the 1980s.

The present school was re-branded in 2017 under the name St Anne’s College Grammar School. Now teaching both girls and boys between the ages of two and nineteen, the school was reported in 2026 to have 77 pupils.

== Notable former pupils ==
- Amanda Barrie, actress
