= Run to My Lovin' Arms =

1965 song

Single by Billy Fury
- B-side: "Where Do You Run"
- Released: 3 September 1965
- Recorded: 1965
- Studio: Decca Studios, London
- Genre: Rock and roll
- Length: 2:51
- Label: Decca
- Songwriter(s): Tony Powers; George Fischoff
- Producer(s): Billtone

Billy Fury singles chronology
"In Thoughts of You" (1965)	"Run to My Lovin' Arms" (1965)	"I'll Never Quite Get Over You" (1966)

"Run to My Lovin' Arms" is a song written by Tony Powers and George Fischoff. It was first released as a single by American singer April Young on 30 April 1965. However, it is better known for being released by English singer Billy Fury in September 1965, whose version peaked at number 25 on the Record Retailer Top 50.

== Billy Fury version ==
=== Release and reception ===
"Run to My Lovin' Arms" was released with the B-side "Where Do You Run", written by Neil Diamond and his then-wife Joyce Posner.

Reviewed in Record Mirror, "Run to My Lovin' Arms" was described as "an unexpected and sudden follow-up. Song is typical of about four years ago, and is a slow builder with a tremendous climax. Very well sung with a delicate, yet powerful backing". Derek Johnson for New Musical Express was "impressed by the conviction and sincerity with which Billy Fury interprets his lyrics thee days, and this flair is again evident in "Run To My Lovin' Arms"". "It's another of those rockaballads in which he specialises, without the pretentious opening of some of his discs".

=== Track listing ===
7": Decca / F 12230

1. "Run to My Lovin' Arms" – 2:51
2. "Where Do You Run" – 2:01

=== Charts ===
Chart (1965)	Peak position
UK Disc Top 30	23
UK Melody Maker Top 50	24
UK New Musical Express Top 30	23
UK Record Retailer Top 50	25

== Other cover versions ==
- In May 1965, American group Jay and the Americans covered the song on their album Blockbusters.
- In October 1965, American singer Lenny Welch released a cover of the song which peaked at number 96 on the Billboard Hot 100.
- In February 1966, American trio the Lettermen released a cover of the song as a non-album B-side to "You'll Be Needin' Me".
- In 1966, Italian singer Fausto Leali released an Italian-language version of the song, titled "Devi pensare a me", on his album Fausto Leali e I Suoi Novelty.
- In 1968, American singer Billy Medley covered the song on his debut solo album Bill Medley 100%.
- In 1989, English singer Freddie Starr covered the song on his album After the Laughter.
