= Hilary Bonner =

English crime novelist (born 1949)

- Born: 1949 (age 76–77); Bideford, Devon, England
- Spouse: Amanda Barrie (m. 2014)

Hilary Bonner (born 1949) is an English crime novelist, best known for her psychological thrillers. Almost all Bonner's novels are inspired by real life events, often drawing on her journalistic past.

== Biography ==
Bonner, a former chairman of the Crime Writers' Association, was raised near the North Devon coast in Bideford, where her father was a butcher and ran a tea shop. She was educated at the town's Edgehill College, and went on to be accepted for the Daily Mirror Training Scheme as a 17-year-old school leaver. She acquired her first job in Fleet Street aged 20, ultimately becoming show business editor of three national newspapers, The Sun, The Mail on Sunday, and the Daily Mirror, and assistant editor of one. She left Fleet Street in 1993 and became a full-time author.

Her published work includes ten novels, five non fiction books, two ghosted autobiographies, one ghosted biography, two companions to TV programmers, and a number of short stories.

== Work ==
Her novel The Dead Cry Out draws on her real life experience of living next door to a murderer. Its inspiration is the case of John Allen, Bonner's friend and neighbour during the 1980s, who in 2003 was found guilty of the murder of his wife and two children 27 years previously.

No Reason to Die, her most controversial book, focuses on the series of unexplained deaths at Deepcut army barracks and elsewhere within the British Army. Bonner worked with the families of several of the dead soldiers in order to produce a complex conspiracy theory which, while presented as fiction, was believed by some to have come uncannily close to the truth.

Her novel The Cruellest Game, first published by Macmillan in 2013, is set on Dartmoor. It charts the cataclysmic collapse of a woman's apparently perfect life when she finds that almost everything in it is based upon a lie.

The Times described her as 'keeping on the public agenda the stories our masters would prefer buried.'

== Personal life ==
Bonner married actor Amanda Barrie on 12 September 2014. The couple live in homes in the Blackdown Hills, Somerset, and London.

== Books ==
=== Fiction ===
- The Cruelty of Morning, 1995
- A Fancy to Kill For, 1997
- A Passion So Deadly, 1998
- For Death Comes Softly, 1999
- A Deep Deceit, 2000
- A Kind of Wild Justice, 2001
- A Moment of Madness, 2002
- When the Dead Cry Out, 2003
- No Reason to Die, 2004
- The Cruellest Game, 2013
- Friends to Die For, 2014
- Death Comes First, 2015
- Deadly Dance, 2017
- Wheel of Fire, 2018
- Dreams of Fear, 2019
- Cry Darkness, 2020
- The Danger Within, 2021

=== Non Fiction ===
- René and Me: The Story of Gorden Kaye, with Gorden Kaye, 1989,
- Benny: a biography of Benny Hill, with Dennis Kirkland 1992
- Journeyman, with Clive Gunnell, 1994
- Heartbeat – the Real Life Story, 1994
- It's Not a Rehearsal: The Autobiography of Amanda Barrie, with Amanda Barrie, 2002
