= Ooh La La! (TV series) =

British television series

- Genre: Comedy
- Written by: Caryl Brahms; Ned Sherrin
- Directed by: Eric Fawcett
- Starring: Patrick Cargill
- Composer: John Dankworth
- Country of origin: United Kingdom
- Original language: English
- No. of series: 3
- No. of episodes: 19

Production
- Producers: Stuart Allen; G.B. Lupino; Douglas Argent
- Running time: 60 minutes
- Production company: British Broadcasting Corporation

Original release
- Network: BBC 2
- Release: 6 April 1968 – 15 June 1973

Ooh La La! is a British television series that appeared on BBC 2 for three series between 6 April 1968 and 16 June 1973. It is an anthology series featuring hour-long adaptations of French farces, primarily written by Georges Feydeau but also including work by Sacha Guitry, Eugène Labiche and Marc-Michel. The third and final series was broadcast in 1973. Patrick Cargill starred in all the episodes along with a revolving cast of guest appearances from other actors including Amanda Barrie, Fenella Fielding, Barbara Windsor and Anton Rodgers.

== Bibliography ==
- Halliwell, Leslie. Halliwell's Teleguide. Granada, 1979.
- Mitchell, Glenn. The Chaplin Encyclopedia. B.T. Batsford, 1997.
