= Seven Little Girls Sitting in the Backseat =

"Seven Little Girls Sitting in the Back Seat"

Single by Paul Evans, The Avons
- B-side: "Worshipping an Idol"
- Released: 1959
- Genre: Rock and roll
- Length: 1:59
- Label: Guaranteed
- Songwriters: Bob Hilliard, Lee Pockriss

Paul Evans, The Avons singles chronology
"At My Party" (1959)	"Seven Little Girls Sitting in the Back Seat" (1959)	"Midnite Special" (1959)

"Seven Little Girls Sitting in the Back Seat" is a song written by Bob Hilliard and Lee Pockriss. It was recorded by Paul Evans (US No. 9) in 1959 and covered the same year by The Avons (UK No. 3).

Ingrid Reuterskiöld (Ninita) wrote lyrics in Swedish, as "Flickor bak i bilen", which was recorded by Siw Malmkvist in 1959. Her version peaked at No. 4 in 1960, according to the bestselling list in the Swedish music paper Show Business. The song was parodied by Country Yossi as "Seven Little Kids".

== Synopsis ==
The song is told from the perspective of a romantically inclined young gentleman driving a car. The teen boy is singing about seven girls in the backseat with his friend Fred (never mind the implausibility of any backseat in a motor vehicle holding eight teenagers). The driver invites one of the young ladies to join him in the front seat, then asks how they like his triple carburetor, then offers to leave as the girls prefer Fred's companionship to his. Each time, however, he is told to pay attention to his driving and that they prefer to remain in the back seat "kissing and hugging with Fred." The despondent fellow then expresses a wish to be as popular as his friend.

== Charts ==
=== Avons version ===
It entered the UK singles chart at No. 26 on 19 November 1959, peaking at No. 3 on 7 January 1960. It charted in the UK Top 10 for eight weeks and was in the Top 20 for a total of 10 weeks.

Chart	Peak position
Norway	8
UK	3

=== Paul Evans version ===
Chart	Peak position
Norway	6
US	9
