= Colette (song) =

1960 single by Billy Fury

Single by Billy Fury
- B-side: "Baby How I Cried"
- Released: 29 January 1960
- Recorded: 8 January 1960
- Studio: Decca Studios, London
- Genre: Rock and roll
- Length: 1:50
- Label: Decca
- Songwriter(s): Billy Fury
- Producer(s): Jack Good

Billy Fury singles chronology
"My Christmas Prayer" (1959)	"Colette" (1960)	"That's Love" (1960)

"Colette" (also spelled "Collette") is a song by English rock and roll singer Billy Fury, released as a single in January 1960. It peaked at number 9 on the Record Retailer Top 50, becoming Fury's first top-ten hit.

== Inspiration and release ==
As a teenager, Fury worked at the Liverpool docks as a deckhand on the tugboats. He recalled that "between tides, I found I had time to spare so I went to a local cinema. There was a French film showing – I forget the title – and the heroine was a pretty girl called Colette. I found a stub of a pencil in my pocket and rummaged round on the floor until I found an old cigarette packet. Then, while the film was still going on, I began to write the lyrics in the dark".

The song was recorded in early January 1960 at Decca Studios in London. The style has been compared to the Everly Brothers, with the song's close harmony, as Fury duets with Ann O'Brien of the Vernons Girls. O'Brien has said that she got an envelope with £7 in for the recording; Fury, on the other hand said that he made £3,000 out of the song.

It was released as a single at the end of January, but didn't enter the charts until the second week of March and peaking at number 9 two weeks later, spending a total of ten weeks on the chart. Fury performed the song on Jack Good's television show Boy Meets Girls, with Marty Wilde singing the harmony. The success of "Colette" led Decca to get Fury to record his debut album The Sound of Fury in April 1960.

Reviewing for Disc, Don Nicholl described "Colette" as having a "twangy background for this song. The beat will get it into the juke boxes I should imagine and all in all the side should improve the boy's standing. Both sides of this release seem to have equal strength, though they're by no means the same in approach. Baby How I Cried is a dark little moaner which Billy fills with hiccoughing feeling".

== Track listing ==
7": Decca / F 11200

1. "Collette" – 1:50
2. "Baby How I Cried" – 2:41

== Charts ==
Chart (1960)	Peak position
UK Disc Top 20	18
UK Melody Maker Top 20	15
UK New Musical Express Top 30	19
UK Record Mirror Top 20	18
UK Record Retailer Top 50	9
