= Letter Full of Tears =

1961 single by Gladys Knight & the Pips

Single by Gladys Knight & the Pips

from the album Letter Full of Tears
- B-side: "You Broke Your Promise"
- Released: November 1961
- Genre: Soul; R&B
- Length: 2:45
- Label: Fury
- Songwriter: Don Covay
- Producers: Bobby Robinson; Marshall Sehorn

Gladys Knight & the Pips singles chronology
"Guess Who" (1961)	"Letter Full of Tears" (1961)	"Operator" (1962)

"Letter Full of Tears" is a song written by American singer-songwriter Don Covay and released by Gladys Knight & the Pips as a single in November 1961. It became their second top-20 hit, peaking at number 19 on the Billboard Hot 100. The song was covered the following year by English singer Billy Fury who had a minor hit with it in the UK.

== Background ==
After the top-ten success of "Every Beat of My Heart" earlier in 1961, subsequent releases of a re-recording of "Every Beat of My Heart" and a cover of the Jesse Belvin song "Guess Who" had failed to continue the group's success. They then asked songwriter Don Covay, who had written Chubby Checker's number one hit "Pony Time", to write a song for them. The resulting song, "Letter Full of Tears", was then arranged by Horace Ott. Bubba Knight has said it "was the first time we had ever used a string section". However, producer Bobby Robinson "didn't really want to record strings, and Marshall Sehorn begged him to put strings on this song for us. Because during this time, when you used strings, it kind of made yourself a bit more sophisticated than the regular R&B thing".

== Track listing ==
7": Fury / 1054

1. "Letter Full of Tears" – 2:45
2. "You Broke Your Promise" – 2:45

== Charts ==
Chart (1962)	Peak position
US Billboard Hot 100	19
US Hot R&B/Hip-Hop Songs (Billboard)	3
US Cash Box Top 100	17
US Cash Box R&B Top 50	6

== Billy Fury version ==
"Letter Full of Tears"

Single by Billy Fury
- B-side: "Magic Eyes"
- Released: 23 February 1962
- Recorded: 14 November 1961
- Studio: Decca Studios, London
- Genre: R&B
- Length: 3:15
- Label: Decca
- Songwriter: Don Covay
- Producers: Dick Rowe; Mike Smith

Billy Fury singles chronology
"I'd Never Find Another You" (1961)	"Letter Full of Tears" (1962)	"Last Night Was Made for Love" (1962)

=== Release ===
"Letter Full of Tears" was a departure for Fury from his previous rock and roll and pop ballad releases. It was his first R&B single, though he had been singing R&B songs on stage for a while. It was recorded in November 1961, soon after the release of Gladys Knight & the Pips' version, and released in February 1962. It was released with the B-side "Magic Eyes", written by Americans Dorian Burton and Herb Bernstein.

"Letter Full of Tears" was not particularly successful, especially given that Fury's previous three singles had all been top-five. However, Fury later said that "I had an awful lot of trouble with this song. I didn't want to do it because it wasn't my style and I find the vocal really difficult to do and I was really pressurised into doing it. And I didn't like the arrangement". Whilst on the official Record Retailer chart, the single only peaked at number 32, it did fare better on other music paper charts, such as Disc and New Musical Express, both on which the single peaked at number 17.

=== Track listing ===
7": Decca / F 11437

1. "I'm Lost Without You" – 2:28
2. "Magic Eyes" – 2:12

=== Charts ===
Chart (1962)	Peak position
UK Disc Top 20	17
UK New Musical Express Top 30	17
UK Record Mirror Top 20	20
UK Record Retailer Top 50	32

== Other versions ==
- In 1974, Millie Jackson covered the song on her album I Got to Try It One Time.
- In 1981, Little Milton covered the song on his album Walkin' the Back Streets.
- In 1982, Randy Crawford covered the song on her album Windsong.
- In 1993, Arlene Smith (former lead singer of the Chantels) and Johnny Colla (guitarist for Huey Lewis and the News) covered the song on the tribute album Celebrating the Music of Don Covay – Back to the Streets.
- In 2012, a previously unreleased recording by Esquerita from 1966 was included on the album Sinner Man – The Lost Session.
