= Paul Evans (musician) =

American singer-songwriter

- Born: March 5, 1938 (age 88); Queens, New York, U.S.
- Genres: Rock and roll; country; pop
- Occupations: Musician; Songwriter
- Instruments: Vocals, guitar
- Years active: 1953–present
- Label: Carlton

Paul Evans (born March 5, 1938) is an American rock and roll singer and songwriter, who was most prominent in the 1950s and 1960s. As a performer, he had hits with the songs "Seven Little Girls Sitting in the Backseat" (his biggest hit, recorded with The Curls, reaching No. 9 on the Billboard Hot 100 in 1959), "Midnight Special," and "Happy-Go-Lucky Me".

Although known primarily for rock and roll, Evans also composed and performed folk music, especially during the Hootenanny era. In a June 1963 interview in New York City on the Folk Music Worldwide radio show, Evans was introduced as "a popular folk singer and also a popular record star in the non-folk area."

Evans had a sizeable hit in the UK and Australia in 1978–79 with the morbid country song "Hello, This Is Joanie" (as it was titled on the New Zealand pressing released by Polydor Records) or, as it was known on a Spring Records release, "Hello, This is Joannie (The Telephone Answering Machine Song)". In a 2004 interview Evans revealed that the voice of Joannie was provided by country artist Lea Jane Berinati.

Evans also had minor hits with "After the Hurricane" which hit No.2 on April 8, 1961, on Vancouver's CFUN chart, and "Feelin' No Pain" which hit No.23 on Canadian CHUM charts.

== Early life ==
According to Evans, his entire family was musically inclined. "Family legend has my father selling his flute to buy me my first guitar." His mother taught and played the piano professionally. His eldest sister Estelle, who was "into folk music and in demand at hootenannies," taught him how to play it.

While attending Andrew Jackson High School, Evans produced and performed in high school shows. Evans received an engineering scholarship to Columbia University, where he hosted a radio show featuring folk music. He left college to pursue a career in music. While waiting for a hit, he sang at local clubs and spent a year, on and off, on the SS France as the ship's singer.

== Popular culture ==
"Happy-Go-Lucky Me" has been featured in the John Waters' film Pecker, and episode #3.10 of the comedy television program Scrubs. In 2014, the song has been included in advertisements for the video game Clash of Clans. The song was also featured in the pilot episode of the 2016 Hulu miniseries 11.22.63.

== Songwriter ==
As a songwriter Evans' songs were performed by numerous performers, including Elvis Presley, Jimmy Dean and Pat Boone. His most successful songs were "Roses Are Red (My Love)", which was a number one hit for Bobby Vinton in the U.S. Billboard Hot 100; and by Ronnie Carroll in the UK reaching no. 3 in 1962; and "When" a chart topper in the UK Singles Chart and #5 in the U.S. for The Kalin Twins.

== Recordings ==
With Larry Kusik, Evans wrote "Live Young" for the 1963 Warner Brothers spring break movie Palm Springs Weekend. Evans' songs have also been recorded by Jackie Wilson, Frankie Lymon, Fabian, the Coasters, and more recently by Reba McEntire. His work has also been used in films and as the theme music for CBS This Morning.

== Autobiography ==
Happy Go Lucky Me: A Lifetime of Music was published in 2021 by McNidder and Grace and is his first book. His autobiography describes his journey from getting his start in the music business, becoming part of the Brill Building's songwriting community and the sixty-three music-filled years that followed.

== Bibliography ==
- Happy Go Lucky Me: A Lifetime Of Music McNidder & Grace (29 July 2021) ISBN 978-0857162182

== Discography ==
=== Albums ===
- Paul Evans Sings the Fabulous Teens (1960)
- Hear Paul Evans in Your Home Tonight! (1961)
- Folk Songs of Many Lands (1961)
- 21 Years in a Tennessee Jail (as Paul Evans and the Rocky Mount Ramblers, 1964)
- Songs of the Letter People (1972)
- Chatter Album (1972)
- Hello This Is Paul Evans (1979)
- The Fabulous Teens and Beyond (1995)
- I Was Part of the 50's (1998)
- Roses Are Red, My Love (2002)
- Happy Go Lucky Me – The Paul Evans Songbook (2003)

=== Singles ===
Year	Single	Peak chart positions									
Year	Single	US	US Country	AUS	CAN	IRE	NOR	NZ	SA	SWE	UK
1957	"What Do You Know?"	—	—	—	—	—	—	—	—	—	—
1957	"Looking for a Sweetie"	—	—	—	—	—	—	—	—	—	—
1957	"Caught"	—	—	—	—	—	—	—	—	—	—
1958	"I Think About You All the Time"/"Oh! No!"	—	—	—	—	—	—	—	—	—	—
1959	"At My Party"	—	—	—	—	—	—	—	—	—	—
1959	"Seven Little Girls Sitting in the Back Seat" (as Paul Evans and the Curls)	9	—	5	3	—	6	—	—	—	25
1959	"Midnite Special"	16	—	—	8	—	—	—	—	—	41
1960	"Happy-Go-Lucky-Me"	10	—	9	7	—	—	—	—	—	—
1960	"The Brigade of Broken Hearts"	81	—	88	—	—	—	—	—	—	—
1960	"Mickey, My Love"	—	—	—	—	—	—	—	—	—	—
1960	"Hushaby Little Guitar"	—	—	—	—	—	—	—	—	—	—
1960	"I Love to Make Love to You"/"Show Folk"	—	—	— 67	—	—	—	—	—	—	—
1961	"After the Hurricane"	—	—	—	—	—	—	—	—	—	—
1961	"This Pullover"	—	—	—	—	—	—	—	—	—	—
1961	"Over the Mountain, Across the Sea"	—	—	—	—	—	—	—	—	—	—
1962	"Feelin' No Pain"	—	—	—	23	—	—	—	—	—	—
1962	"D-Darling"	—	—	—	—	—	—	—	—	—	—
1962	"The Bell That Couldn't Jingle"	—	—	—	—	—	—	—	—	—	—
1963	"What Are the Lips of Janet"	—	—	—	—	—	—	—	—	—	—
1963	"Ten Thousand Tears"	—	—	—	—	—	—	—	—	—	—
1963	"Two Different Things"	—	—	—	—	—	—	—	—	—	—
1964	"Bewitched" (as Paul and Mimi Evans)	—	—	—	—	—	—	—	—	—	—
1964	"Little Miss Tease"	—	—	—	—	—	—	—	—	—	—
1965	"Always Thinking of the Roses"	—	—	—	—	—	—	—	—	—	—
1968	"One Red Rose"	—	—	—	—	—	—	—	—	—	—
1969	"Life's Carousel" (as E. Paul Evans)	—	—	—	—	—	—	—	—	—	—
1971	"Think Summer"	—	—	—	—	—	—	—	—	—	—
1971	"Here We Go Round Again"	—	—	—	—	—	—	—	—	—	—
1972	"Try It You'll Like It"	—	—	—	—	—	—	—	—	—	—
1973	"That's What Loving You Is All About"	—	—	—	—	—	—	—	—	—	—
1973	"Natural Cotton – Natural Man" (as Eli Whitney)	—	—	—	—	—	—	—	—	—	—
1974	"But I Was Born in New York City"	—	—	—	—	—	—	—	—	—	—
1975	"Happy Birthday, America"	—	—	—	—	—	—	—	—	—	—
1977	"Roses Are Red "Medley""	—	—	—	—	—	—	—	—	—	—
1978	"Hello, This Is Joannie (The Telephone Answering Machine Song)"	—	57	22	—	2	—	21	14	8	6
1978	"I'm Giving Up My Baby"	—	—	—	—	—	—	—	—	—	—
1979	"Disneyland Daddy"	—	81	—	—	—	—	—	—	—	—
1979	"What's a Nice Guy Like Me (Doing in a Place Like This)" (UK-only release)	—	—	—	—	—	—	—	—	—	—
1980	"Good Neighbour"	—	—	—	—	—	—	—	—	—	—
1980	"One Night Led to Two"	—	80	—	—	—	—	—	—	—	—
1993	"Willie's Sung with Everyone (But Me)" (EP)	—	—	—	—	—	—	—	—	—	—
2006	"Happy Birthday, America" (remix)	—	—	—	—	—	—	—	—	—	—
2006	"Santa's Stuck Up in the Chimney" (remix)	—	—	—	—	—	—	—	—	—	—
"—" denotes releases that did not chart or were not released in that territory.

== See also ==
- Teenage tragedy song
