= I've Gotta Horse =

1965 British film by Kenneth Hume

- DVD cover
- Directed by: Kenneth Hume
- Written by: Kenneth Hume (story); Larry Parnes (story); Ronald Chesney; Ronald Wolfe
- Produced by: Kenneth Hume; Larry Parnes
- Starring: Billy Fury; Amanda Barrie; Michael Medwin; Marjorie Rhodes; Bill Fraser
- Cinematography: Ernest Steward
- Edited by: Ernest Hosler
- Music by: Mike Leander
- Production company: Windmill Films
- Distributed by: Warner Bros-Pathe (UK)
- Release date: 8 July 1965
- Running time: 92 minutes
- Country: United Kingdom
- Language: English
- Budget: £200,000

I've Gotta Horse (also known as Wonderful Day) is a 1965 British musical comedy film directed by Kenneth Hume and starring Billy Fury, Amanda Barrie, Michael Medwin, Jon Pertwee and pop bands The Gamblers and The Bachelors. It was written by Larry Parnes, Ronald Chesney and Ronald Wolfe. Musical direction was by Mike Leander.

== Plot ==
Based on the star's famous love of animals, this musical comedy portrays Billy setting out to add a sheepdog to his vast entourage of animals and coming back with an irresistible horse named Armitage instead. To his manager's horror, Billy smuggles the horse backstage during rehearsals for his big show and the horse proceeds to create havoc. Little do either of them know that Armitage is actually a thoroughbred racehorse. Then Billy's horse contracts pneumonia and Billy must choose between love of his horse and the big show.

== Cast ==
- Billy Fury as Billy
- Amanda Barrie as Jo
- Michael Medwin as Hymie Campbell
- Marjorie Rhodes as Mrs Bartholomew
- Bill Fraser as Mr Bartholomew
- Peter Gilmore as Jock
- Allan Angel as dancer
- Peter Ardran as dancer
- The Bachelors as themselves
- Tom Bowman as Trainer
- Elisa Buckingham as Melissa
- Linda Bywaters as dancer
- Elaine Carr as dancer
- Tom Carty as dancer
- Michael Cashman as Peter
- Doreen Cran as dancer
- Ronald Curran as dancer
- Roy Durbin as dancer
- Leslie Dwyer as Bert
- Fred Emney as Lord Bentley
- John Falconer as butler
- The Gamblers as themselves
- Richard Gardner as dancer
- Terry Gilbert as dancer
- Bill Harvey as dancer
- Derina House as dancer
- John Kelly as Michael – donkey man
- Ann Lancaster as woman shopkeeper
- Pauline Loring as Lady Bentley
- Constance Luttrell as Duchess
- Cal McCord as Whitney
- Rosemary Neil-Smith as Lady Sloane
- Sheila O'Neill as Betty
- Jon Pertwee as costumier's assistant
- Gareth Robinson as jockey
- Brian Todd as dancer

== Production ==
The film is a semi-autobiographical musical comedy based on a script by Fury's manager. It was one of several musicals featuring rock stars from Nat Cohen at Anglo-Amalgamated, starting with The Tommy Steele Story and including Play It Cool (1962) also with Fury. In July 1964 Fury signed a contract with Anglo to make three films over the next two years of which I've Gotta Horse was to be the first.

The film was shot on location in Techniscope at Great Yarmouth where Fury had just finished his summer season at the Royal Aquarium Theatre which was used as the theatre in the film, with shooting also taking place at Shepperton Studios in September 1964.

According to Amanda Barrie, continuity on the film was poor because the director, Ken Hume, would routinely throw out pages of the script if running behind schedule. She also says the first two weeks of filming had to be re-shot because the wrong film stock had been used. Barrie says she and Fury had an affair during the shoot.

The film features Fury's race horse, Anselmo, and several of his dogs.

== Soundtrack ==
The following songs were performed in the film, all written by David Heneker and John Taylor, and performed by Billy Fury, except where noted.

- "I've Gotta Horse"
- "Stand by Me"
- "Do the Old Soft Shoe" (Jay Taylor), performed by Billy Fury and Sheilla O'Neill
- "I Cried All Night", performed by The Gamblers.
- "Far Far Away" (Jimmy Kennedy), performed by The Bachelors
- "I Like Animals"
- "Find Your Dream" (John Taylor)
- "Dressed Up For a Man", performed by Amanda Barrie
- "He's Got the Whole World in His Hands" (Phil Raymond, Richard Gregory and Lew Griffiths), performed by The Bachelors
- "Won't Somebody Tell Me Why"
- "Problems", performed by Amanda Barrie and Michael Medwin
- "You've Got to Look Right for the Part", performed by Billy Fury, Amanda Barrie and Jon Pertwee
- "I Must Be Dreaming"(Jackie DeShannon and Sharon Sheeley)
- "Like a Child"
- "My Friend"
- "How Can You Tell"
- "Finale Melody"
- "Wonderful Day" (Mike Leander), performed by the cast.

Billy Fury's numbers included his backing group The Gamblers, consisting of Jim Crawford (lead guitar/vocals), Alan George (piano/organ), Andy Mac (drums), Ken Brady (sax), Tony Diamond (guitar, trumpet, vocals) and Alan Sanders (bass vocals).

Professional ratings
Review scores
Source	Rating
Record Mirror	5/5 stars

The film's soundtrack album "I've Gotta Horse" was released in March 1965. It was produced by Dick Rowe for Decca Records (Decca LK 4677). It does not include four of the songs from the film: "I Must Be Dreaming", "Like a Child", "My Friend" and "How Can You Tell".

== Reception ==
The Monthly Film Bulletin wrote: "The line-up of songs and production numbers is unusually generous: sometimes there is only a brief snippet of dialogue or story development (not that there is, in fact, much of a plot) to separate them. The dance ensembles are executed with precision, yet despite a general liveliness and even suggestions of imagination in the presentation, they lack that eye-catching exuberance and flair which one associates with Hollywood: somehow or other the polish does not create a real shine. Billy Fury makes an agreeable hero, but it is Amanda Barrie who, despite having little to do, steals the show through sheer personality and an ability to make a mediocre line sound like a pearl of humour."

Kine Weekly wrote: "The plot is slight but credible, and not only because it features the star's own lovely dogs and his well-known racehorse. Billy Fury himself emerges as a most pleasant youngster, with a sunny disposition. He has a number of songs, including the title number, and sings them in a way that will delight his many admirers. He is supported by talented light comedy, represented by Amanda Barrie as his girl friend, Jo; Michael Medwin as Hymie; Bill Fraser as the producer; and Leslie Dwyer as Bert. The use of a backstage story naturally gives plenty of opportunity for colour, gay costumes and some very lively dancing led by Sheila O'Neill."
