= The Puppets =

The Puppets were an English pop/beat group from Preston, Lancashire, that were managed and recorded by Joe Meek. They were active from 1962 to 1967.

== Formation and activities ==
Drummer Des O'Reilly had been in The Rebels. Afterwards, he was in Bob Johnson and the Bobcats (1960 – 1962), which included Jim Whittle on bass and Dave Millen on guitar. O'Reilly then formed The Puppets (1962 – 1967), with Millen and Whittle and later in 1965, Don Parfitt.

The Puppets backed artists such as Brenda Lee, The Ronettes, Dee Dee Sharp, Gene Vincent, Vince Eager, Marty Wilde, Michael Cox, Duffy Power, Jess Conrad, Crispian St. Peters, Billy Fury, and Millie.

== Band members ==
- Des O'Reilly drums, vocals (b. Desmond Vincent O'Reilly, 28 May 1944, Deepdale Road, Preston, Lancashire, d. 1 January 2018).
- Dave Millen lead guitar (b. David Millen, 29 January 1943, Preston, Lancashire d. 19 January 2010, Welwyn Garden City, Hertfordshire).
- Jim Whittle bass (b. James Whittle, 1 July 1943, Preston, Lancashire).
- Don Parfitt organ (b. Donald Parfitt, 3 January 1943, Todmorden, Yorkshire).

== Discography ==
- "Everybody's Talking" / "Poison Ivy" (Leiber/Stoller) (September 1963); Pye 7N15558
- "Three Boys Lookin' For Love" / "Shake With Me" (1964); Pye 7N15625 (originally withdrawn, but released in the 1990s)
- "Baby Don't Cry" / "Shake With Me" – (May 1964); Pye 7N15634
