= Dance On! =

1962 single by the Shadows

Single by The Shadows
- B-side: "All Day"
- Released: 7 December 1962
- Recorded: 21 November 1962
- Studio: EMI Studios, London
- Genre: Instrumental rock
- Length: 2:22
- Label: Columbia
- Songwriter(s): Valerie Murtagh; Elaine Murtagh; Ray Adams
- Producer(s): Norrie Paramor

The Shadows singles chronology
| "The Boys" (1962) | "Dance On!" (1962) | "Foot Tapper" (1963) |

"Dance On!" is an instrumental by British group the Shadows, released as a single in December 1962. It went to number 1 on the UK Singles Chart and the Irish Singles Chart. A vocal version, with lyrics by Marcel Stellman, was recorded by British female vocalist Kathy Kirby, whose version reached number 11 on the UK chart in September 1963.

== Release and reception ==
"Dance On!" was written by Valerie Murtagh, Elaine Murtagh and Ray Adams, better known for being the members of pop vocal group the Avons. It was released with the B-side "All Day", written by Bruce Welch and Hank Marvin. In the US and Canada, "Dance On!" was released with the B-side "The Rumble", written by guitarist Ike Isaacs.

Reviewed in New Record Mirror, "Dance On!" was described as sounding "rather reminiscent of Duane Eddy ... which soon falls into the jug-along formula that we're used to. Tuneful and exciting in parts, there's a lot of versatility involved in this one. Not as original as we expected though – but perhaps originality for this sort of group has been exhausted". Reviewing for Disc, Don Nicholl wrote that the song "beats a very infectious path and the side has a lot more to offer than their "Guitar Tango" dramaties".

== Track listings ==
7": Columbia / DB 4948

1. "Dance On!" – 2:22
2. "All Day" – 2:34

7": Atlantic / 45-2177 (US and Canada)

1. "Dance On!" – 2:20
2. "The Rumble" – 1:52

== Personnel ==
- Hank Marvin – electric lead guitar
- Bruce Welch – acoustic rhythm guitar
- Brian Locking – electric bass guitar
- Brian Bennett – drums, sistrum

== Charts ==
| Chart (1963) | Peak position |
|---|---|
| Australia (Kent Music Report) | 9 |
| Belgium (Ultratop 50 Flanders) | 14 |
| Belgium (Ultratop 50 Wallonia) | 47 |
| Canada (Vancouver CFUN) | 26 |
| Denmark (Danmarks Radio) | 4 |
| Germany (GfK) | 45 |
| Hong Kong | 3 |
| Ireland (IRMA) | 1 |
| Israel (Kol Israel) | 2 |
| Netherlands (Single Top 100) | 8 |
| New Zealand (Lever Hit Parade) | 2 |
| Norway (VG-lista) | 2 |
| South Africa (SARMDA) | 2 |
| Spain (Promusicae) | 16 |
| Sweden (Kvällstoppen) | 3 |
| UK Singles (OCC) | 1 |

== Kathy Kirby version ==
"Dance On"

Single by Kathy Kirby
- B-side: "Playboy"
- Released: 21 June 1963
- Genre: Pop
- Length: 2:28
- Label: Decca
- Songwriter(s): Valerie Murtagh; Elaine Murtagh; Ray Adams
- Producer(s): Peter Sullivan

Kathy Kirby singles chronology
| "Big Man" (1962) | "Dance On" (1963) | "Secret Love" (1963) |

=== Release and reception ===
Kirby's version of "Dance On", with lyrics by Marcel Stellman, was released in June 1963 and became her first charting single, though it did not enter the UK Singles Chart until the third week of August, reaching its peak four weeks later. However, it became more successful in Australia, where it topped the charts. The song features guitar by Jimmy Page as well as an orchestral arrangement by Charles Blackwell. It was released with the B-side "Playboy", written by Clive Westlake and Richard Gregory.

Reviewing for Disc, Don Nicholl described the orchestra as an "excellent compelling noise" and that "Kirby's vocal of this melody is well up to the standard of that start. The girl sings the song strongly and in a manner which should make it a very commercial proposition". In New Record Mirror, it was described as having "a nicely-handled vocal", with "some good drumming behind her and a general sense of drive and urgency without anything being overdone".

=== Track listing ===
7": Columbia / F 11682

1. "Dance On" – 2:28
2. "Playboy" – 2:34

=== Charts ===
| Chart (1963) | Peak position |
|---|---|
| Australia (Kent Music Report) | 1 |
| UK Singles (OCC) | 11 |

== Other versions ==
- In 1963, Petula Clark recorded the song in French ("Je me sens bien auprès de toi") and Italian ("Sto volentieri con te"), the former of which made the top 5 in France and peaked at number 2 in Wallonia. She also recorded an English version for album release on the Canadian market. Clark also recorded a vocal version of another of the Shadows' UK chart topper, "Foot Tapper", mainly for the French market and sung entirely in French as "Mon bonheur danse".
- In 1963, Wyn Hoop record a German-language version ("Warum gehst du an mir vorbei"), which peak at number 45 in Germany.
- In 1964, Bill Haley and His Comets released a Spanish-language version of the song, "A Gusto Contigo", on their album Surf, Surf, Surf (Orfeon Records LP-12-354). Haley's recording is patterned after the Clark "Je me sen bien" arrangement.
