= That's Love (Billy Fury song) =

1960 single by Billy Fury

Single by Billy Fury with the Four Jays

from the album The Sound of Fury
- B-side: "You Don't Know"
- Released: 13 May 1960
- Recorded: 14 April 1960
- Studio: Decca Studios, London
- Genre: Rock and roll
- Length: 1:48
- Label: Decca
- Songwriter(s): Billy Fury
- Producer(s): Jack Good

Billy Fury with the Four Jays singles chronology
"Colette" (1960)	"That's Love" (1960)	"Wondrous Place" (1960)

"That's Love" is a song by English singer Billy Fury with the vocal group The Four Jays, released as a single in May 1960. It peaked at number 19 on the Record Retailer Top 50.

== Release and reception ==
"That's Love" was released as the only single from Fury's debut album The Sound of Fury, yet neither single nor album were particularly successful, with both only briefly appearing on their respective charts. As with the rest of the album, "That's Love" and its B-side "You Don't Know" were written by Fury, although the latter under the pseudonym Wilber Wilberforce.

Reviewing for Disc, Don Nicholl described Fury as "rocking on a comfortable winner in "That's Love"" and that "it should register happily in all the juke areas and I am also tipping it to climb into the big selling league". He also described "You Don't Know" as "almost a talker. Extremely slow with piano and guitar behind Billy. I think he tends to over-dramatise this half".

== Track listing ==
7": Decca / F 11237

1. "That's Love" – 1:48
2. "You Don't Know" – 2:28

== Personnel ==
- Billy Fury – vocals
- Joe Brown – guitar
- Reg Guest – piano
- Alan Weighall – electric bass guitar
- Bill Stark – bass guitar
- Andy White – drums
- The Four Jays (Joe McKinley, J Bretton, Johnny Morgan and Jonie Chalmers) – backing vocals

== Charts ==
Chart (1960)	Peak position
UK Melody Maker Top 20	17
UK New Musical Express Top 30	22
UK Record Mirror Top 20	20
UK Record Retailer Top 50	19
