= I'd Never Find Another You =

1961 song by Tony Orlando

Single by Billy Fury
- B-side: "Sleepless Nights"
- Released: 1 December 1961
- Recorded: 14 November 1961
- Studio: Decca Studios, London
- Genre: Pop
- Length: 2:34
- Label: Decca
- Songwriters: Gerry Goffin; Carole King
- Producers: Dick Rowe; Mike Smith

Billy Fury singles chronology
"Jealousy" (1961)	"I'd Never Find Another You" (1961)	"Letter Full of Tears" (1962)

"I'd Never Find Another You" is a song written by Gerry Goffin and Carole King and first released by American singer Tony Orlando on his album Bless You and 11 Other Great Hits in September 1961.

== Billy Fury version ==
In December 1961, English singer Billy Fury released a cover of the song as a single. It peaked at number 5 on the Record Retailer Top 50 in January 1962 and received a silver disc for 250,000 sales.

=== Release and reception ===
Fury had previously covered an Orlando song, also written by Goffin and King, "Halfway to Paradise", which was also a top-five hit. "I'd Never Find Another You" was Fury's final single of 1961, released for Christmas. The B-side, "Sleepless Nights", was written by Buck Ram and had been released by former Platters lead singer Tony Williams as a single in August 1961. Both sides are backed by an orchestra directed by Ivor Raymonde.

Reviewing for Disc, Don Nicholl described "I'd Never Find Another You" as "a rather graceful ballad with a beat in it, the song is sung simply and warmly by Fury to a catchy accompaniment". Reviewed in New Musical Express, it was described as a "medium-pace rock-cum-Latin beat [that] runs behind the most attractive melody". Fury was also praised for his "versatility of tackling anything from out-and-out rock'n'roll to sentimental ballads [which] has really come to the fore this year and he's now a mature, dependable artist".

=== Track listing ===
7": Decca / F 11409

1. "I'd Never Find Another You" – 2:34
2. "Sleepless Nights" – 2:42

=== Charts ===
Chart (1962)	Peak position
Ireland (Evening Herald)	3
New Zealand (Lever Hit Parade)	7
UK Disc Top 20	2
UK Melody Maker Top 20	2
UK New Musical Express Top 30	3
UK Record Mirror Top 20	4
UK Record Retailer Top 50	5

== Other cover versions ==
- In 1962, Canadian singer Paul Anka released a cover of the song as a single, which peaked at number 106 on the Billboard Bubbling Under the Hot 100.
- In 1977, Singaporean–Malaysian singer Sharifah Aini covered the song on her album Forever and Ever.
- In 2004, Irish duo Foster and Allen covered the song on their album Sing the Sixties.
- In 2011, Scottish singer Rab Noakes covered the song on his album Standing Up Again.
