= Lost Without You (Teddy Randazzo song) =

1964 single by Teddy Randazzo

"I'm Lost Without You"

Single by Billy Fury
- B-side: "You Better Believe It Baby"
- Released: 1 January 1965
- Recorded: 18 November 1964
- Studio: Decca Studios, London
- Genre: Pop
- Length: 3:15
- Label: Decca
- Songwriter(s): Teddy Randazzo; Billy Barberis
- Producer(s): Billtone

Billy Fury singles chronology
"The Hippy Hippy Shake" (1964)	"I'm Lost Without You" (1965)	"In Thoughts of You" (1965)

"Lost Without You" is a song written by American songwriters Teddy Randazzo and Billy Barberis and first released by Randazzo as a single in September 1964. It was not as successful as some of his previous releases, only peaking at number 130 on the Billboard Bubbling Under the Hot 100. The song had more success in the UK after it was covered by English singer Billy Fury, who released his version titled "I'm Lost Without You".

== Billy Fury version ==
=== Release and reception ===
Fury released his version on New Year's Day in 1965 (it did not become a bank holiday in England until 1974). It was released with the B-side "You Better Believe It Baby", written by Jerry Ross, Kenneth Gamble and Chubby Checker and first released the previous year by Checker as the B-side to "She Wants T'Swim".

=== Track listing ===
7": Decca / F 12048

1. "I'm Lost Without You" – 3:15
2. "You Better Believe It Baby" – 2:03

=== Charts ===
Chart (1965)	Peak position
UK Disc Top 30	16
UK Melody Maker Top 50	15
UK New Musical Express Top 30	13
UK Record Retailer Top 50	16

== Other versions ==
- In 1989, English singer Freddie Starr covered the song on his album After the Laughter.
- In 2015, New Zealand musician Marlon Williams covered the song on his eponymous album.
- In 2017 English singer Marc Almond covered the song on his album Shadows and Reflections.
