= Last Night Was Made for Love =

1962 single by Billy Fury

Single by Billy Fury
- B-side: "A King for Tonight"
- Released: 27 April 1962
- Recorded: 30 March 1962
- Studio: Decca Studios, London
- Genre: Pop
- Length: 2:15
- Label: Decca
- Songwriter(s): Alan Fielding
- Producer(s): Dick Rowe; Mike Smith

Billy Fury singles chronology
"Letter Full of Tears" (1962)	"Last Night Was Made for Love" (1962)	"Once Upon a Dream" (1962)

"Last Night Was Made for Love" is a song by English singer Billy Fury, released as a single in April 1962. It peaked at number 4 on the Record Retailer Top 50.

== Release and reception ==
"Last Night Was Made for Love" was written by Alan Fielding who also went on to write another top-five hit for Fury, "When Will You Say I Love You". The B-side, "A King for Tonight" was written by Doc Pomus and Mort Shuman and had been originally released by American singer Barry Darvell as a single in February 1962.

Reviewing for New Musical Express, Keith Fordyce described "Last Night Was Made for Love" as "a most appealing tango" and that "Billy is nearer to having Presley type appeal than any other British singer I can think of". He described "A King for Tonight" as having "a rock beat, a good tune, but lacks inspiration". Reviewed in New Record Mirror, "Last Night Was Made for Love" was described as "a classy ballad that is delivered against a background of crashing drums and soaring strings. But he can't resist a touch of wildness, a few snarls and groans to jerk you out of your seat".

== Track listing ==
7": Decca / F 11409

1. "Last Night Was Made for Love" – 2:15
2. "A King for Tonight" – 2:04

== Charts ==
Chart (1962)	Peak position
Ireland (Evening Herald)	6
UK Disc Top 20	6
UK Melody Maker Top 30	5
UK New Musical Express Top 30	6
UK Record Retailer Top 50	4
