= Because of Love (Elvis Presley song) =

1962 song

Song by Elvis Presley

from the album Girls! Girls! Girls!
- Released: November 9, 1962
- Recorded: March 27, 1962
- Studio: Radio Recorders Studio B, Los Angeles, California
- Genre: Pop
- Length: 2:31
- Label: RCA Victor
- Songwriter(s): Ruth Batchelor; Bob Roberts
- Producer(s): Joseph Lilley

"Because of Love" is a song by Elvis Presley, released on his soundtrack album Girls! Girls! Girls! in November 1962.

== Recording ==
"Because of Love" was recorded on March 27, 1962, at Radio Recorders in Hollywood, which was the second day of recording sessions for the album. It took six takes to record the version on the album and it features backing vocals from the Jordanaires.

It was released as a single in Greece in June 1963, with the flip side being another song from Girls! Girls! Girls!, "The Walls Have Ears".

== Billy Fury version ==
"Because of Love"

Single by Billy Fury
- B-side: "Running Around"
- Released: 19 October 1962
- Recorded: 5 June 1962
- Studio: Decca Studios, London
- Genre: Pop
- Length: 2:31
- Label: Decca
- Songwriter(s): Ruth Batchelor; Bob Roberts
- Producer(s): Mike Smith

Billy Fury singles chronology
"Once Upon a Dream" (1962)	"Because of Love" (1962)	"Like I've Never Been Gone" (1963)

Whilst Presley was the first to record "Because of Love", it was first released by English singer Billy Fury in October 1962 as a single. It peaked at number 18 on the Record Retailer Top 50.

=== Release and reception ===
Earlier in 1962, Fury and Larry Parnes flew to Los Angeles to give Presley his gold and silver discs for Decca UK sales. They spent the day on the Girls! Girls! Girls! film set and as a result, Fury decided to record a version of "Because of Love".

"Because of Love" was originally half-released in mid-September, before being withdrawn. It was then properly released a month later with the B-side "Running Around", written by Ernie Maresca and Ricky Shaw, and originally released by Shaw as "A Fool's Memory" in May 1962.

Reviewing for Disc, Don Nicholl wrote that Fury "sings darkly for the upper half here with a very Presley-like intonation. The ballad itself is the sort which Elvis had taken to in recent months. A slow compulsive ballad with a Latin beat in it, "Because of Love" should stir up plenty of emotions in young hearts". In New Record Mirror, it was described as "deep down Billy emoting soulfully about the effects of love upon him – which are considerable. The tempo is a notch above slow and the backing includes girl chorus and a multitude of strings".

=== Track listing ===
7": Decca / F 11508

1. "Because of Love" – 2:31
2. "Running Around" – 2:01

=== Charts ===
Chart (1962)	Peak position
UK Singles (OCC)	18
UK Disc Top 30	16
UK Melody Maker Pop 50	20
UK New Musical Express Top 30	19
UK Record Retailer Top 50	18
