= In Thoughts of You =

1965 single by Billy Fury

Single by Billy Fury
- B-side: "Away from You"
- Released: 18 June 1965
- Recorded: May 1965
- Studio: Decca Studios, London
- Genre: Pop
- Length: 2:46
- Label: Decca
- Songwriter(s): Geoff Morrow; Chris Arnold
- Producer(s): Billtone

Billy Fury singles chronology
"I'm Lost Without You" (1965)	"In Thoughts of You" (1965)	"Run to My Lovin' Arms" (1965)

"In Thoughts of You" is a song by English singer Billy Fury released as a single in June 1965. It peaked at number 9 on the Record Retailer Top 50, becoming Fury's final top-ten single.

== Release and reception ==
"In Thoughts of You" was written by Geoff Morrow and Chris Arnold and was their first chart success. The two would write another hit for Fury with David Martin, "I'll Never Quite Get Over You". The B-side, "Away from You", was written by David Wilcox, David Elias and Keith Draper, who were members of the Liverpool beat group the Nocturns. Fury's manager Larry Parnes had bought some of the songs written by the three Nocturns members for "a small fee with a royalty clause built in" and one of the songs was decided to be the subsequent A-side single to "In Thoughts of You". However, Parnes and the three Norturns had a disagreement and the former pulled the plug on Fury recording any more of their songs after "Away from You".

Reviewing for New Musical Express, Derek Johnson wrote that there is a "symphonic opening with a concerto-type piano" and that "it quickly breaks into a mid-tempo ballad with muted brass and Knute guitar work. Mike Leander's colourful pulse-quickening scoring embellishes the descriptive lyric, of the kind Billy handles so well".

== Track listing ==
7": Decca / F 12178

1. "In Thoughts of You" – 2:46
2. "Away from You" – 2:16

== Charts ==
Chart (1965)	Peak position
UK Disc Top 30	7
UK Melody Maker Top 50	12
UK New Musical Express Top 30	9
UK Record Retailer Top 50	9
