= When Will You Say I Love You =

1963 single by Billy Fury

Single by Billy Fury
- B-side: "All I Wanna Do Is Cry"
- Released: 10 May 1963
- Recorded: 26 September 1962
- Studio: Decca Studios, London
- Genre: Pop
- Length: 2:24
- Label: Decca
- Songwriter(s): Alan Fielding
- Producer(s): Mike Smith

Billy Fury singles chronology
"Like I've Never Been Gone" (1963)	"When Will You Say I Love You" (1963)	"In Summer" (1963)

"When Will You Say I Love You" is a song by English singer Billy Fury, released as a single in May 1963. It peaked at number 3 on the Record Retailer Top 50.

== Release and reception ==
"When Will You Say I Love You" was written by Alan Fielding, who had previously written another Fury hit "Last Night Was Made for Love". The B-side, "All I Wanna Do Is Cry" was written by David Battaglia and Johnny Brandon and had originally been released by America R&B singer Billy Bland in January 1962.

Reviewing for Disc, Don Nicholl wrote that "When Will You Say I Love You" "opens as if it's going to be a fast piano concerto. But soon slides into a familiar lazy beat for another hit ballad", with Fury singing "the lyrics romantically with those undertones of Presley which seem to be doing him a lot of good commercially nowadays". In New Record Mirror, it was described as "a good song with a good tune and a very good lyric. Medium tempo, with a different approach that seems fresh for a change".

== Track listing ==
7": Decca / F 11655

1. "When Will You Say I Love You" – 2:24
2. "All I Wanna Do Is Cry" – 2:15

== Charts ==
Chart (1963)	Peak position
Ireland (IRMA)	4
UK Disc Top 30	5
UK Melody Maker Pop 50	4
UK New Musical Express Top 30	5
UK Record Retailer Top 50	3
