= Once Upon a Dream (Billy Fury song) =

1962 single by Billy Fury

Single by Billy Fury
- B-side: "If I Lose You"
- Released: 13 July 1962
- Recorded: 5 June 1962
- Studio: Decca Studios, London
- Genre: Pop
- Length: 1:55
- Label: Decca
- Songwriter(s): Norrie Paramor; Dick Rowe
- Producer(s): Mike Smith

Billy Fury singles chronology
"Last Night Was Made for Love" (1962)	"Once Upon a Dream" (1962)	"Because of Love" (1962)

"Once Upon a Dream" is a song by English singer Billy Fury, released as a single in July 1962. It peaked at number 7 on the Record Retailer Top 50.

== Release ==
"Once Upon a Dream" was taken from the musical film Play It Cool, in which Fury also stars. In the film, Fury sings it at the departure lounge in Gatwick Airport.

It was released as a single in July 1962, a week before the release of the film. The music was composed by Norrie Paramor, known for being the producer for Cliff Richard, and the lyrics written by Dick Rowe, producer and Head of A&R at Decca Records.

"Once Upon a Dream" was released with the B-side "If I Lose You", written by Fury, in the UK, Ireland, Denmark, France and India. However, in Australia, it was released with the B-side "You're Swell", written by Rowe, and in Germany, the B-side was "Play It Cool", written by Paramor. These two B-sides had been included on an EP titled Play It Cool, released in May 1962.

== Track listing ==
7": Decca / F 11485

1. "Once Upon a Dream" – 1:55
2. "If I Lose You" – 1:52

== Charts ==
Chart (1962)	Peak position
UK Disc Top 20	6
UK Melody Maker Top 30	7
UK New Musical Express Top 30	7
UK Record Retailer Top 50	7
