= Like I've Never Been Gone =

1962 single by Chase Webster

Single by Billy Fury
- B-side: "What Do You Think You're Doing Of"
- Released: 8 February 1963
- Recorded: 14 December 1962
- Studio: Decca Studios, London
- Genre: Pop
- Length: 2:01
- Label: Decca
- Songwriter(s): Paul Hampton; Camille Monte
- Producer(s): Mike Smith

Billy Fury singles chronology
"Because of Love" (1962)	"Like I've Never Been Gone" (1963)	"When Will You Say I Love You" (1963)

"Like I've Never Been Gone" is a song written by Paul Hampton and Camille Monte and first released by American country singer Chase Webster in July 1962. In February 1963, English singer Billy Fury released a cover of the song which peaked at number 3 on the Record Retailer Top 50.

== Billy Fury version ==
=== Release and reception ===
"Like I've Never Been Gone" was released with the B-side "What Do You Think You're Doing Of", written by Fury. The phrase 'what are you doing of' was another way of saying 'what are you doing'.

Reviewing for Disc, Don Nicholl wrote that "Like I've Never Been Gone" "is the kind of song I can imagine Presley wishing he'd got his hands on. Instead it's going to make another hit for Fury. A sultry Latin beater which he sings in his most commercial voice. First-class backing, including chorus, is directed by Ivor Raymonde". In New Record Mirror, the song was described as "a semi-bluesy, semi-ballady thing with a good tune and an especially good lyric. Powerful Presley-type vocalising from Billy – this could be a really big one".

=== Track listing ===
7": Decca / F 11582

1. "Like I've Never Been Gone" – 2:01
2. "What Do You Think You're Doing Of" – 2:59

=== Charts ===
Chart (1963)	Peak position
Ireland (IRMA)	5
Israel (Kol Yisrael)	3
New Zealand (Lever Hit Parade)	7
UK Disc Top 30	3
UK Melody Maker Pop 50	3
UK New Musical Express Top 30	3
UK Record Retailer Top 50	3
