= The Sound of Fury (album) =

Studio album by Billy Fury
- Released: May 1960
- Recorded: 14 April 1960
- Studio: Decca Studio 2, West Hampstead, London
- Genre: Rock and roll; rockabilly
- Label: Decca
- Producer: Jack Good

Billy Fury chronology
| The Sound of Fury (1960) | Billy Fury (1960) |

The Sound of Fury was the first album released by Billy Fury in 1960. The album has been described as "the best rock & roll album to come out of England's original beat boom of the late 1950s". Fury was possibly the first British rock 'n roll artist to write his own songs, sometimes under the pseudonym Wilbur Wilberforce.

The album was recorded in Decca Studio 3, West Hampstead, London, on 14 April 1960. It featured Joe Brown on guitar, Reg Guest on piano, and bassists Bill Stark or Alan Weighell. Andy White, later to notably appear on The Beatles' first single "Love Me Do", is the drummer on the album. Providing backing vocals were the Four Jays.

The album made the top twenty, reaching position 18 on the UK Albums Chart for a week. Although the album was not well appreciated at the time of its release, it is now regarded as one of the most important early British rock 'n roll albums.

In 2007, The Guardian included the record in their list of "1000 albums to hear before you die"; they wrote that it "turned the one-time Ronald Wycherley into the British Elvis", adding that "its Sun Records sound, aching balladeering and raw blues provided his greatest moment before pop's dreamboat era dulled his fire."

== Track listing ==
| No. | Title | Writer(s) | Length |
|---|---|---|---|
| 1. | "That's Love" | Billy Fury | 1:48 |
| 2. | "My Advice" | Wilber Wilberforce | 2:05 |
| 3. | "Phone Call" | Wilberforce | 2:44 |
| 4. | "You Don't Know" | Wilberforce | 2:28 |
| 5. | "Turn My Back On You" | Wilberforce | 2:25 |
| 6. | "Don't Say It's Over" | Fury | 1:54 |
| 7. | "Since You've Been Gone" | Wilberforce | 2:25 |
| 8. | "It's You I Need" | Fury | 1:47 |
| 9. | "Alright, Goodbye" | Wilberforce | 2:06 |
| 10. | "Don't Leave Me This Way" | Fury | 2:41 |
