= Playbox (1955 TV series) =

British children's television series

Playbox is a British children's television programme that was broadcast on BBC from 1955 to 1964. Presenters who appeared on it included Eamonn Andrews, Rolf Harris, Tony Hart, Cliff Michelmore and Johnny Morris.

Vere Lorrimer directed Playbox, and Cliff Michelmore produced it.

== Reception ==
Tom Harrisson of the Evening Standard wrote that the presenter Eamonn Andrews "managed three delicious girls and three cheerful boys quite brilliantly for a guessing game which used movement and sound with such intelligence as to make true TV".
