= Maybe Tomorrow (Billy Fury song) =

1959 single by Billy Fury

Single by Billy Fury
- B-side: "Gonna Type a Letter"
- Released: 16 January 1959
- Recorded: 26 November 1958
- Studio: Decca Studios, London
- Genre: Pop
- Length: 2:18
- Label: Decca
- Songwriter: Billy Fury
- Producer: Jack Good

Billy Fury singles chronology
"Maybe Tomorrow" (1959)	"Margo" (1959)

"Maybe Tomorrow" is a song by English rock and roll singer Billy Fury, released as his debut single in January 1959. It peaked at number 18 on the New Musical Express Top 30.

== Background and release ==
In May 1958, Fury cut several demo tracks at Phillips' Sound Recording Services in Liverpool and sent them to impresario Larry Parnes. Despite receiving no reply, Fury was more successful upon writing again, with Parnes inviting him to the Essoldo Theatre in Birkenhead in October, where Parnes was staging one of his tours. Fury performed several songs backstage to Parnes and one of his protégés Marty Wilde, in the hope that Wilde would record them. Instead, Parnes got Fury to go up on stage and make his public debut, performing "Margo", "Don't Knock Upon My Door" and "Maybe Tomorrow". The next day, Fury joined Parnes' tour.

He recorded his first single, the self-penned "Maybe Tomorrow", towards the end of November at Decca Studios in London. The B-side, "Gonna Type a Letter" was recorded in December. Despite the single's release in January 1959, it took until the final week of February for it to enter the UK Singles Chart (i.e. the New Musical Express chart), before dropping out of the chart two weeks later. It re-entered the chart two weeks later, reaching its highest chart position, number 18.

Don Nicholl for Disc described "Maybe Tomorrow" as "a slow, beating ballad" and "high flying girl chorus wafts in the backings as Billy chants his soulful song". He described "Gonna Type a Letter" as a "quicker rock number which Fury chants after the manner of many who have gone before. Routine material of this nature for those who just want a fresh title". In a retrospective review of the song for The Sound of Fury fan club magazine, Chris Eley described "Maybe Tomorrow" as a "haunting, wistful paean of heartbreak and teenage angst".

The single was also released in the US by London Records in January 1959, where it reportedly gained some interest, and in New Zealand in July 1959. Fury's first EP, known as Maybe Tomorrow, was released in June 1959, and features "Maybe Tomorrow" and the follow-up single "Margo" along with their B-sides.

== Track listing ==
7": Decca / F 11102

1. "Maybe Tomorrow" – 2:18
2. "Gonna Type a Letter" – 2:52

== Charts ==
Chart (1959)	Peak position
UK Disc Top 20	19
UK New Musical Express Top 30	18
UK Record Mirror Top 20	17
