= Play It Cool (film) =

1962 British film by Michael Winner

Play it Cool
- British theatrical poster
- Directed by: Michael Winner
- Screenplay by: Jack Henry
- Produced by: David Deutsch; Leslie Parkyn; Julian Wintle
- Starring: Billy Fury; Michael Anderson Jr. Helen Shapiro; Bobby Vee
- Cinematography: Reginald H. Wyer
- Edited by: Tristam Cones
- Music by: Norrie Paramor
- Production companies: Independent Artists; Coronado Productions Ltd.
- Distributed by: Anglo-Amalgamated Film Distributors
- Release date: March 1962
- Running time: 82 minutes
- Country: United Kingdom
- Language: English
- Budget: $400,000

Play It Cool is a 1962 British musical film directed by Michael Winner and starring Billy Fury, Michael Anderson Jr., Helen Shapiro, Bobby Vee, Shane Fenton, Danny Williams, Dennis Price, Richard Wattis, Maurice Kaufmann and Anna Palk.

It was one of several pop musicals released around this time. Many of these were, like Play it Cool financed by Nat Cohen at Anglo Amalgamated.

== Plot ==
Struggling singer Billy Universe and his band The Satellites befriend an heiress who, against the wishes of her father, is searching for her lover whom she has been forbidden to see and with whom she is hoping to elope. The main characters visit a succession of nightclubs where other stars are performing. There are guest appearances by Lionel Blair and Bernie Winters, as well as by record producer Norrie Paramor.

== Cast ==
- Billy Fury as Billy Universe
- Michael Anderson, Jr. as Alvin
- Helen Shapiro as herself
- Bobby Vee as himself
- Dennis Price as Sir Charles Bryant
- Richard Wattis as nervous man
- Danny Williams as himself
- Shane Fenton as himself
- Jimmy Crawford as himself
- Lionel Blair as himself
- Anna Palk as Ann Bryant
- Felicity Young as Yvonne Pemberton
- Ray Brooks as Freddy
- Jeremy Bulloch as Joey
- Maurice Kaufmann as Larry Granger
- Peter Barkworth as Skinner
- Bernie Winters as Sydney Norman
- Roy Skelton as mechanic #1 (uncredited)
- Michael Collins as mechanic #2 (uncredited)

== Production ==
Michael Winner said he was given the job off the back of several short films he had made. He later commented: "they started to make pop films and that provided the break for young directors. The French New Wave had produced a few young directors and the idea of a director in his twenties was not totally unheard of. That’s how Sidney Furie came in, you know, with Cliff Richard. Dick Lester came in with It’s Trad Dad (1962), and the same week I came in with a film called Play It Cool with Billy Fury."

Winner called it "Britain’s first twist film. Except nobody was twisting there yet, so they didn’t quite know what it was ... But working on a feature film of whatever calibre was obvious preferable to sitting at home waiting for the phone to ring." He wanted to make the movie on location in real clubs but the producers turned down the idea: “We don’t want to go into the West End. Where would we park the cars and have lunch? Besides we have all these lovely men at Pinewood doing nothing and we think they ought to build something. So they put up a lot of rubbish as they always do a few potted plants and bits of hardboard with wallpaper on them then filled the place with extras looking bored."

The only hit from the songs featured in the film was Fury's rendition of "Once Upon a Dream".

== Critical reception ==
The Monthly Film Bulletin wrote: "Since It's Trad, Dad deliriously pointed the way for this sort of haphazard pop musical free-for-all, the old-style "straight" treatment seems hopelessly outdated. But while making use of the usual silly romantic complication as an excuse to introduce a collection of frantic musical acts, this film benefits from a youthfully spirited treatment and some coarse-grained comedy that clicks as often as it misses. The boisterous camaraderie of the "Satellites" promises well, though it gets side-tracked by all those reverent tributes to such hit parade guests as Helen Shapiro, Bobby Vee and the talented Danny Williams. The hero is Billy Fury, who, while apparently suffering from an Elvis Presley complex, can't quite shake off an Old Kent Road perkiness which is rather endearing. "The Twist" also figures largely, with particular and inevitable emphasis on large figures."

The New York Times reviewer Eugene Archer called Fury "a Cockney imitation of Elvis Presley" and commented: "some low-budget British filmmakers have contrived a flimsy plot in which he and his gang of Teddyboys escort a pretty socialite around London's twist dives in search of her fickle fiancé. ... The film is full of wiggling hips, throbbing larynxes and youthful energy. As for the sound track – well, it's loud." In the New York Daily News, critic Kathleen Carroll echoed the Presley comparisons, adding that "the film, blatantly geared toward the teen-age market and perhaps a few latent twist fans [...] is [a wearying] experience for those bored with the twist."
