= Kathy Kirby =

English singer (1938–2011)

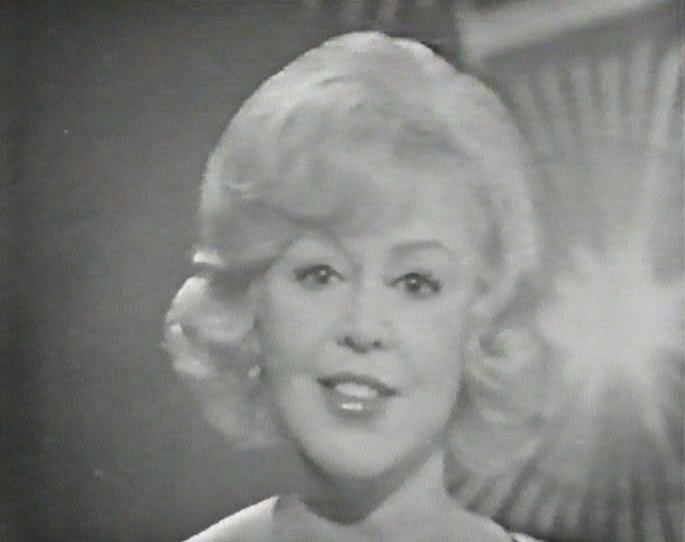
- Kirby at the Eurovision Song Contest 1965

Background information
- Born: Catherine Ethel O'Rourke; 20 October 1938; Ilford, Essex, England
- Died: 20 May 2011 (aged 72) London, England
- Genre: Pop
- Occupation: Singer
- Instrument: Vocals
- Years active: 1960–1983
- Label: Decca Records

Kathy Kirby (born Catherine Ethel O'Rourke; 20 October 1938 – 20 May 2011) was an English singer, best known for her cover version of Doris Day's "Secret Love" and for representing the United Kingdom in the Eurovision Song Contest 1965, where she finished in second place. Her popularity peaked in the 1960s, when she was one of the best-known and most-recognised personalities in British show business.

== Early life ==
Kirby was born in Ilford, Essex (later part of Greater London), the eldest of three children of Irish parents. Her mother Eileen brought them up alone after their father left early in their childhood. Kirby grew up on Tomswood Hill, Barkingside, in Ilford, and attended the Ursuline Convent School, where she sang in the choir.

== Career ==
Kirby's vocal talent became apparent early in life, and she took singing lessons with a view to becoming an opera singer. She became a professional singer after meeting bandleader Bert Ambrose at the Ilford Palais in 1956. She remained with Ambrose's band for three years, and he remained her manager, mentor and lover until his death in Leeds in 1971.

During the summer of 1957, Kirby performed at the Florida Park Restaurant in Madrid, and after returning to the UK not only performed with Ambrose's orchestra, but also with Nat Allen and his band. In 1959, Kirby joined vocalists Tony Mansell and Rikki Henderson in the Denny Boyce Band, and appeared regularly at the Lyceum Ballroom in London. In the summer of 1959, she made her solo cabaret debut at the Astor Club. She was subsequently signed to Pye Records in 1960, for whom she released two singles, "Love Can Be" and "Now You're Crying". They sold few copies, but helped her get a six-month contract at Mayfair's Blue Angel nightclub. Also in 1960, on Parlophone Records, (45-R 4620), she was the uncredited girl speaker on Bruce Forsyth's ' I'm a Good Boy '. She adopted a "blonde bombshell" look and was compared to Marilyn Monroe.

In 1962, Kirby signed a contract with Decca Records, for whom her first single was "(He's a) Big Man", released in October 1962. It sold well over a long period of time, but failed to reach the British charts. In the summer of 1963, after becoming a regular on the musical TV programme Stars and Garters, she had her first hit, "Dance On!", which peaked at No. 11 in the UK chart and No. 1 in Australia. Its follow-up was an upbeat reworking of the Doris Day classic "Secret Love", which peaked at No. 4 on the UK Singles Chart. In the same year, she won Top British Female Singer in the New Musical Express poll. Her album 16 Hits From Stars & Garters was released at the end of 1963, and cracked the top 20. The single "Let Me Go, Lover!", another upbeat reworking, this time of the hit by Joan Weber, reached No. 10 in early 1964. Kirby disliked the song, stating that: "Honestly, I was really surprised because I never had much hope for this record, and when I recorded it I thought it might never get anywhere at all."

"Let Me Go, Lover!" was followed by "You're the One", which peaked at No. 17 in May 1964. That success was followed by a record-breaking summer season show at the ABC Theatre in Blackpool.

Kirby became one of the biggest stars of the early to mid-1960s, appearing in the Royal Command Variety Performance and two television series for BBC TV. She represented the United Kingdom in the Eurovision Song Contest 1965 and came second with the song "I Belong", which also became a hit. Author and historian John Kennedy O'Connor describes Kirby's "I Belong" as being far more representative of current musical tastes than other songs from the contest, but she was beaten by France Gall from France, and representing Luxembourg, singing an even more contemporary song written by Serge Gainsbourg. Bitter at her defeat, she slapped Gall. An EP was issued featuring the six songs selected for the Eurovision Contest, featuring a different version of "I Belong", which peaked at No. 10 in 1965. An Italian version of "I Belong" was recorded by her under the title "Tu Sei Con M. She also sang the theme tune for the BBC television series Adam Adamant Lives!.

In September 1965, her single "The Way of Love" charted at No. 88 on the US Billboard Top 100. The song also charted in some of the regional charts, such as No. 35 in New York, No. 16 in Philadelphia, No. 39 in Detroit, No. 39 in Washington, and No. 38 in Los Angeles.

After the chart success of "I Belong", Kirby recorded more than a dozen singles between 1965 and 1967, but they failed to chart. She continued to make television appearances, including on The Wheeltappers and Shunters Social Club in 1975.

During the 1970s, Kirby's singing career was eclipsed by a turbulent personal life, but she continued to perform live at smaller venues and made occasional television appearances and performed a few live concerts on the nostalgia circuit. On 31 December 1976, she performed her hit song "Secret Love" on BBC1's A Jubilee of Music, celebrating British pop music for Queen Elizabeth II's impending Silver Jubilee.

Her final single, "He", was released in March 1981, at which time she was interviewed by Simon Reed for ITV. The interview focused on her attempted comeback after a difficult decade personally and professionally.

In December 1983, she gave one last concert in Blackpool, then retired from show business altogether.

== Post-retirement ==
Kirby did not perform in public after her retirement, but interest in her and her work continued, particularly among gay men, for whom she was something of an icon. In her last decade, she recorded short greetings for her official website. A biography was published in 2005, and there was a 2008 stage show about her life, written and produced by Graham Smith, called Secret Love. Smith re-wrote the show for the 2012 Haworth Festival, entitling it: Dance On: The Kathy Kirby Story.

The Daily Express reported in 2008 that plans for a newly filmed interview had been abandoned, but later reports confirmed that the interview had been filmed, and it was subsequently included on a DVD compilation released the following year. She also gave an interview to the Express in 2009, which included recent photographs and was billed as her first in 26 years.

Following the 2009 interview, the Sunday Express reported that some previously unreleased recordings would be made available on CD in 2010, and that Kirby had been approached to appear on Desert Island Discs, although neither the programme nor the CD has been released.

== Personal life ==
Kirby met bandleader Bert Ambrose in her teens and, despite his being 42 years older and having an estranged wife at the time, began a relationship with him that lasted until his death in 1971. In the 2009 interview, she said she had had an affair with Bruce Forsyth during this time.

Kirby was married briefly to writer and former London policeman Frederick Pye in the 1970s. Following her bankruptcy in 1975 and a court case following an arrest over an unpaid hotel bill, she was referred to St Luke's psychiatric hospital in London in 1979. Following her discharge, she lived with a female fan, Laraine McKay. McKay was imprisoned for fraud and forgery. In the early 1980s Kirby had relationships with musician David Cross and lawyer Alan Porter.

Kirby was diagnosed with schizophrenia and was in poor physical and mental health for much of her life. After her retirement she lived in a series of apartments and hotels in west London, settling in an apartment in Emperor's Gate, South Kensington, surviving on state benefits and some royalties, and maintaining what has been called a "Garbo-esque" seclusion. Shortly before her death, Kirby moved to Brinsworth House in Twickenham at the insistence of her niece Sarah, Lady Thatcher, wife of Mark Thatcher.

Kirby died on 20 May 2011, a few days after moving to Brinsworth House. According to a message posted by a relative on a fan website, she had a heart attack. She was survived by her sister Pat and her brother Douglas.

== BBC TV series ==
=== The Kathy Kirby Show - Series 1 ===
No. overall	No. in series	Title	Directed by	Original release date
1	1	"The Kathy Kirby Show"	Ernest Maxin	3 May 1964 BBC1 at 7:25pm
Starring Kathy Kirby with Peter Gordeno, Carlo Dini, Wilf Todd and his Combo, Carl Gonzales, The George Mitchell Singers and The Six Dancing Showmen. Special guest star: Stratford Johns. Orchestra under the direction of Harry Rabinowitz. Repeated 4 August 1964.
2	2	"The Kathy Kirby Show"	Ernest Maxin	16 October 1964 BBC1 at 9:30pm
Starring Kathy Kirby with Bernard Bresslaw, Jessie Matthews, Peter Gordeno, Robert Franklyn, Louis Mansi, Carl Gonzales, The George Mitchell Singers and The Six Dancing Showmen. Orchestra under the direction of Eric Robinson.
3	3	"The Kathy Kirby Show"	Ernest Maxin	30 October 1964 BBC1 at 8:25pm
Starring Kathy Kirby with Richard Wattis, Pat Coombs, Peter Gordeno, Robert Bell, Vie Riscoe, Carl Gonzales, The George Mitchell Singers and The Six Dancing Showmen. Orchestra under the direction of Eric Robinson.
4	4	"The Kathy Kirby Show"	Ernest Maxin	13 November 1964 BBC1 at 8:25pm
Starring Kathy Kirby with The Max Jaffa Trio, Peter Gordeno, The Morgan-James Trio, The George Mitchell Singers and The Six Dancing Showmen. Orchestra under the direction of Eric Robinson.
5	5	"The Kathy Kirby Show"	Ernest Maxin	27 November 1964 BBC1 at 8:25pm
Starring Kathy Kirby with Ronnie Carroll, Peter Gordeno, The Three Monarchs, The Hi-Fi's, The George Mitchell Singers and The Show Dancers. Orchestra under the direction of Eric Robinson.
6	6	"The Kathy Kirby Show"	Ernest Maxin	11 December 1964 BBC1 at 8:25pm
Starring Kathy Kirby with Peter Gordeno, The Three Monarchs, The Hi-Fi's, The George Mitchell Singers and The Show Dancers. Orchestra under the direction of Eric Robinson.
7	7	"The Kathy Kirby Show"	Ernest Maxin	1 January 1965 BBC1 at 8:25pm
Starring Kathy Kirby with Val Doonican, Peter Gordeno, The King Brothers, The George Mitchell Singers and The Dancing Showmen. Orchestra under the direction of Eric Robinson.
8	8	"Kathy Kirby Sings A Song For Europe 1965"	Ernest Maxin	29 January 1965 BBC1 at 8:25pm
Six songs written by six leading songwriters. The winning song to be sung by Kathy Kirby at the Eurovision Song Contest 1965 in Naples on 20 March. Orchestra under the direction of Eric Robinson.
9	9	"The Kathy Kirby Show"	Ernest Maxin	12 February 1965 BBC1 at 8:25pm
Starring Kathy Kirby with the result of 'A Song For Europe 1965' with guests Adam Faith, Peter Gordeno, Pepe Jaramillo, The Hi-Fi's, The George Mitchell Singers and The Dancing Showmen. Orchestra under the direction of Eric Robinson.
10	10	"The Kathy Kirby Show"	Ernest Maxin	26 February 1965 BBC1 at 8:25pm
Starring Kathy Kirby with guests Peter Gordeno, Brian Davies, Jamaica's Own Vagabonds, The Hi-Fi's, The George Mitchell Singers and The Dancing Showmen. Orchestra under the direction of Eric Robinson.
11	11	"The Kathy Kirby Show"	Ernest Maxin	12 March 1965 BBC1 at 8:25pm
Starring Kathy Kirby with guests Stubby Kaye, Peter Gordeno, The Clark Brothers, The George Mitchell Singers and The Dancing Showmen. Orchestra under the direction of Eric Robinson.

=== The Kathy Kirby Show - Series 2 ===
No. overall	No. in series	Title	Directed by	Original release date
12	1	"The Kathy Kirby Show"	Ernest Maxin	28 August 1965 BBC1 at 8:30pm
Starring Kathy Kirby with Peter Nero, Billy Fury, Peter Gordeno, The George Mitchell Singers and The Dancing Showmen. Orchestra under the direction of Eric Robinson.
13	2	"The Kathy Kirby Show"	Ernest Maxin	18 September 1965 BBC1 at 6:40pm
Starring Kathy Kirby with Buddy Greco, Peter Nero, The George Mitchell Singers and The Dancing Showmen. Orchestra under the direction of Eric Robinson.
14	3	"The Kathy Kirby Show"	Ernest Maxin	9 October 1965 BBC1 at 7:25pm
Starring Kathy Kirby with Adam Faith, Kenny Ball and his Jazzmen, Peter Gordeno, The George Mitchell Singers and The Dancing Showmen. Orchestra under the direction of Eric Robinson.
15	4	"The Kathy Kirby Show"	Ernest Maxin	30 October 1965 BBC1 at 8:55pm
Starring Kathy Kirby with Adele Leigh, Pepe Jaramillo, Peter Gordeno, The George Mitchell Singers and The Dancing Showmen. Orchestra under the direction of Eric Robinson.
16	5	"The Kathy Kirby Show"	Ernest Maxin	20 November 1965 BBC1 at 8:55pm
Starring Kathy Kirby with Lonnie Donegan, The Beverley Sisters, Peter Gordeno, The George Mitchell Singers and The Dancing Showmen. Orchestra under the direction of Eric Robinson.
17	6	"The Kathy Kirby Show"	Ernest Maxin	11 December 1965 BBC1 at 9:05pm
Starring Kathy Kirby with Tom Jones, Peter Gordeno, The Merry Men, The George Mitchell Singers and The Dancing Showmen. Orchestra under the direction of Eric Robinson.
18	7	"The Kathy Kirby Show"	Ernest Maxin	22 January 1966 BBC1 at 8:25pm
Starring Kathy Kirby with Roy Castle, Peter Gordeno, Kenny Ball & his Jazzmen, The George Mitchell Singers and The Dancing Showmen. Orchestra under the direction of Eric Robinson.
19	8	"The Kathy Kirby Show"	Ernest Maxin	12 February 1966 BBC1 at 8:25pm
Starring Kathy Kirby with Roy Castle, Dave Allen, Nina & Frederik, Peter Gordeno, Kenny Ball & his Jazzmen, The George Mitchell Singers and The Dancing Showmen. Orchestra under the direction of Eric Robinson.

=== TV specials ===
No. in series	Title	Directed by	Original release date
1	"International Cabaret starring Kathy Kirby"	Stewart Morris	17 October 1966 BBC2 at 9:05pm
Kenneth Williams introduces tonight's star: Kathy Kirby. Orchestra under the direction of Harry Rabinowitz & Alyn Ainsworth.
2	"Something Special"	Michael Mills	12 July 1967 BBC2 at 8:05pm
Kathy Kirby invites you to join her at 'Kate's' where you will be able to meet her guest Libby Morris and see the all-girl show with Betty Smith's Barnstormers, The She-Trinity, The Four Jays and Peter Gordeno's Daughters of Terpsichore. Orchestra directed by Harry Rabinowitz.

== Discography ==
=== Singles (UK) ===
Year	Title	Chart positions
Year	Title	UK
1960	"Love Can Be"	
1961	"Danny"	
1962	"Big Man"	
1963	"Dance On"	11
1963	"Secret Love"	4
1964	"Let Me Go, Lover!"	10
1964	"You're The One"	17
1964	"Don't Walk Away"	
1965	"I Belong"	36
1965	"The Way of Love"	
1965	"Where in the World"	
1966	"The Adam Adamant Theme"	
1966	"Spanish Flea"	
1967	"Turn Around"	
1967	"No-one's Gonna Hurt You Anymore"	
1967	"In All the World"	
1968	"Come Back Here with My Heart (Con Due Occhi Cosi)"	
1968	"I Almost Called Your Name"	
1969	"I'll Catch The Sun"	
1969	"Is That All There Is?"	
1970	"Wheel of Fortune"	
1970	"My Way"	
1971	"Bill"	
1971	"Can't Help Lovin' That Man"	
1971	"So Here I Go"	
1972	"Do You Really Have a Heart"	
1973	"Singer with the Band"	
1973	"Little Song for You"	
1976	"My Prayer"	
1981	"He"	
1982	"Secret Love"	

Note: Kirby had one charted single on the US Billboard Hot 100: "The Way of Love" peaked at No. 88 in 1965.

== Albums and E.P. ==
Year	Title	Chart positions
Year	Title	UK
1963	Sixteen Hits from Stars & Garters	11
1965	A Song for Europe (EP)	10
1966	Make Someone Happy	
1968	My Thanks to You	
1970	The World of Kathy Kirby	

Awards and achievements
Preceded by Matt Monro with "I Love the Little Things"	United Kingdom in the Eurovision Song Contest; 1965	Succeeded by Kenneth McKellar with "A Man Without Love"
