= Billy Fury =

British rock and roll musician (1940–1983)

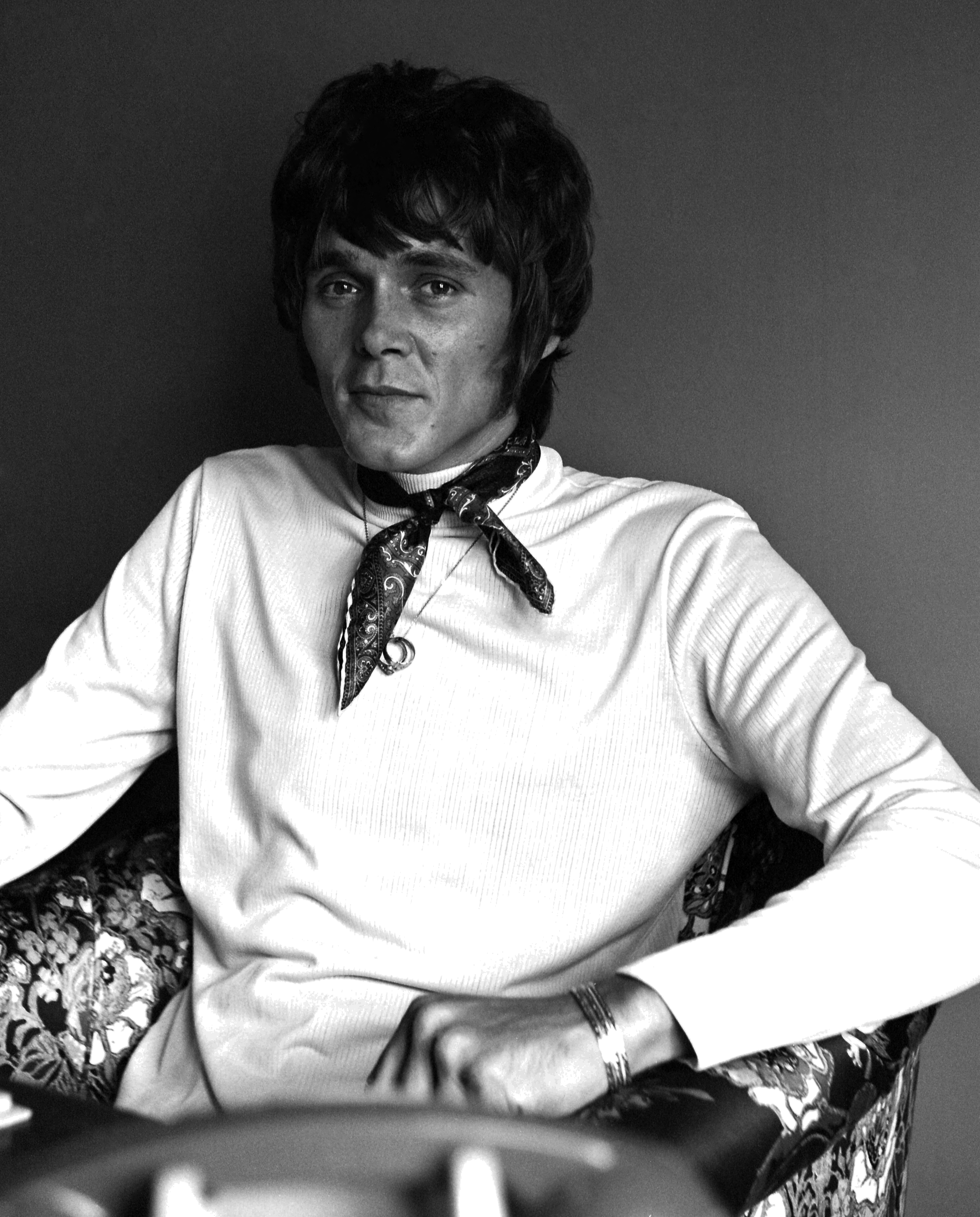
- Fury photographed by Allan Warren in 1968

Background information
- Born: Ronald William Wycherley; 17 April 1940; Liverpool, England
- Died: 28 January 1983 (aged 42) London, England
- Genres: Rock and roll; pop; pop rock; rockabilly
- Occupation: Musician
- Instruments: Vocals, guitar, piano, drums
- Years active: 1958–1983
- Labels: Decca; Parlophone; Polydor; Warner Bros.
- Formerly of: Joe Brown; Vince Eager; Georgie Fame; Johnny Gentle; Billy J. Kramer; Dickie Pride; the Puppets; the Searchers; The Tornados; Marty Wilde
- Website: billyfury.co.uk

Ronald William Wycherley (17 April 1940 – 28 January 1983), known professionally as Billy Fury, was an English musician. An early star of rock and roll, he spent 332 weeks on the UK singles chart. His hit singles include "Wondrous Place", "Halfway to Paradise" and "Jealousy". Fury also maintained a film career, notably playing rock performers in Play It Cool in 1962 and That'll Be the Day in 1973.

AllMusic journalist Bruce Eder stated that Fury's "mix of rough-hewn good looks and unassuming masculinity, coupled with an underlying vulnerability, all presented with a good voice and some serious musical talent, helped turn [him] into a major rock and roll star in short order". Others have suggested that his rapid rise to prominence was due to his "Elvis-influenced hip swivelling and, at times, highly suggestive stage act".

== Early years ==
Fury was born Ronald William Wycherley at Smithdown Hospital (later known as Sefton General Hospital, since demolished) on Smithdown Road in Liverpool on 17 April 1940. He commenced music lessons on the piano before he was a teenager and was bought his first guitar by the age of 14. Wycherley fronted his own group in 1955 but simultaneously worked full-time on a tugboat and later as a docker. He entered and won a talent competition and by 1958 had started composing his own songs.

== Career ==
=== Early career ===
Wycherley went to meet pop manager and impresario Larry Parnes at the Essoldo Theatre in Birkenhead, hoping to interest one of Parnes' protégés, singer Marty Wilde, in some of the songs he had written. Instead, in an episode that has since become pop music legend, Parnes pushed young Wycherley up on stage right away. He was such an immediate success that Parnes signed him, added him to his tour, and renamed him "Billy Fury".

However, his early sexual and provocative stage performances received censure, and he was forced to tone them down. In October 1959, the UK music magazine, NME, commented that Fury's stage antics had been drawing much press criticism.

He released his first hit single for Decca, "Maybe Tomorrow", in 1959. He also appeared in a televised play Strictly for Sparrows, and subsequently on Oh Boy! In March 1960, he reached No. 9 in the UK singles chart with his own composition "Colette", followed by "That's Love" and his first album The Sound of Fury (1960), which featured a young Joe Brown on lead guitar, with backup vocals by the Four Jays. Fury secured more hits and split from his band Georgie Fame and the Blue Flames, Parnes held auditions in Liverpool for a new group. Among those who auditioned were the Beatles, who at this time were still calling themselves the Silver Beetles. They were offered the job for £20 a week on condition that they sacked their bassist Stuart Sutcliffe. John Lennon refused and the band left after Lennon had secured Fury's autograph.

=== UK chart and film success ===
Fury concentrated less on rock and roll and more on mainstream ballads, such as "Halfway to Paradise" and "Jealousy" (which reached No. 3 and No. 2 respectively in the UK Singles Chart in 1961). Fury confessed to the NME that "I wanted people to think of me simply as a singer – and not, more specifically, as a rock singer. I'm growing up, and I want to broaden my scope. I shall continue to sing rock songs, but at the same time my stage act is not going to be as wild in the future". It was Decca's decision to mould Fury into a teen idol after his last self-penned song, "My Christmas Prayer", had failed to chart. Chartwise the years 1961 through 1963 were Fury's best. In 1962, he appeared in his first film, Play It Cool, modelled on the Elvis films. It featured Helen Shapiro, Danny Williams, Shane Fenton and Bobby Vee, who appeared with the Vernons Girls. The hit single from the film was "Once Upon a Dream". There were other notable performances by several British actors and performers such as Richard Wattis, Lionel Blair and Dennis Price.

Fury's We Want Billy! (1963) was one of the first live albums in UK rock history. It featured renditions of his hits and cover versions of several R&B songs such as "Unchain My Heart".

In 1965 he appeared in the film I've Gotta Horse, which also featured his backing group the Gamblers, the Bachelors, Amanda Barrie, Michael Medwin and Jon Pertwee. The album from the film was made available in stereo. Fury left Decca Records in 1966 after signing to a five-year recording contract with Parlophone.

Having had more UK hits, such as "It's Only Make Believe" and "I Will" (written by Dick Glasser, not to be confused with the Paul McCartney song), both in 1964, and "In Thoughts of You" (1965), Fury began a lengthy absence from the charts in 1967, and underwent surgery for heart problems in 1972 and 1976 which led to his abandoning touring. Despite spending many weeks in the charts, Fury never achieved a number one single, but he remained popular even after his hits stopped. "I Will" became a US hit for Dean Martin (1965) and for Ruby Winters (1977).

=== Later years ===
In 1973, Fury emerged from a period of semi-retirement to appear as 'Stormy Tempest' in the film That'll Be the Day. The film starred David Essex and Ringo Starr and was roughly based on the early days of the Beatles. Starr was from the Dingle area of Liverpool, as was Fury, and had originally played drums for Rory Storm & the Hurricanes, whom the Stormy Tempest group were said to be modelled on.

In the mid-1970s, Fury went out on the road with Marty Wilde. Away from the spotlight, he focused on wildlife preservation. Fury's health deteriorated and he underwent two open heart surgeries: the first in 1972 and the second in 1976. Fury was declared bankrupt in 1978 for unpaid taxes to the Inland Revenue. The taxes dated back to 1962 and totalled £16,780. Plus Fury was forced to sign over his royalties and publishing income. A new release, "Be Mine Tonight" (1981), failed to make an appearance in the UK Singles Chart. Worse followed in March 1981 when Fury, working on his own farm, collapsed and almost died. He returned to touring later that year but his next two singles, "Love or Money" and "Devil or Angel", barely dented the UK chart.

In 1981 and 1982, Fury was signed to Polydor Records by A&R man Frank Neilson, and he recorded a comeback album, The One and Only (released posthumously), with Shakin' Stevens' producer Stuart Colman. Owing to his health, Fury did little touring to promote the new album. His last public appearance was at the Sunnyside pub, Northampton, on 4 December 1982. A few days before he died, Fury recorded a live performance for the Channel 4 television show Unforgettable, featuring six of his old hits; however, at the request of his mother, only four of them were broadcast.

== Personal life ==
Fury was a keen birdwatcher. He lived with businesswoman Lee Everett Alkin, better known as "Lady Lee" Middleton, from 1959 to 1967.

During this time, he had a short relationship with actress Amanda Barrie, his co-star in I've Gotta Horse. Fury went from Liverpool to London (like the Beatles) and he lived in Number 1 Cavendish Avenue, the same street as Paul McCartney. He is remembered and honoured with a blue plaque there.

Fury married Judith Hall in May 1969, but left her for heiress Lisa Voice. They lived together in London, and sometimes on Fury's farm in Wales, from 1971 until his death, although they led separate lives for the last two years.

== Death ==
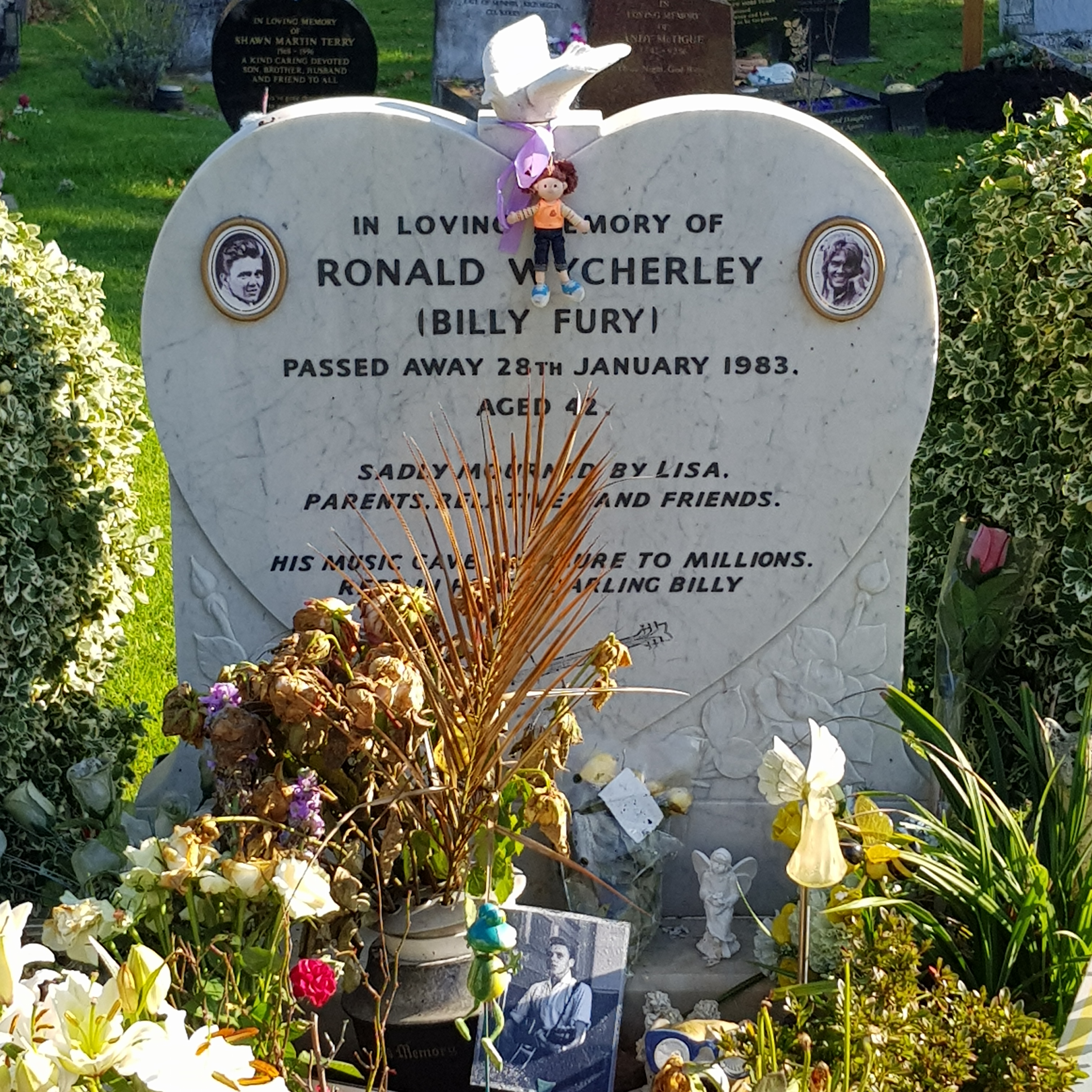
Billy Fury's grave at Mill Hill Cemetery

After returning from a recording session in the early hours of 28 January 1983, Fury collapsed from a heart attack at his home in London. His manager, Tony Read, found him unconscious the next morning. He was taken to St Mary's Hospital in Paddington, but died in the afternoon, aged 42. Rheumatic fever, which he first contracted as a child, damaged his heart and ultimately contributed to his death. A week after his death, a funeral service was held at the St John's Wood Church in London, for which his body was embalmed by Desmond Henley. Among the mourners were Larry Parnes, Marty Wilde, Jess Conrad, Eden Kane, Tony Read, Hal Carter and Mick Green, in addition to family members, friends and fans. The choir sang a special version of Billy's Decca hit "I'm Lost Without You". After the service Fury's body was buried at Mill Hill cemetery, in North London. A song issued posthumously entitled "Forget Him" became his final chart hit.

== Legacy ==
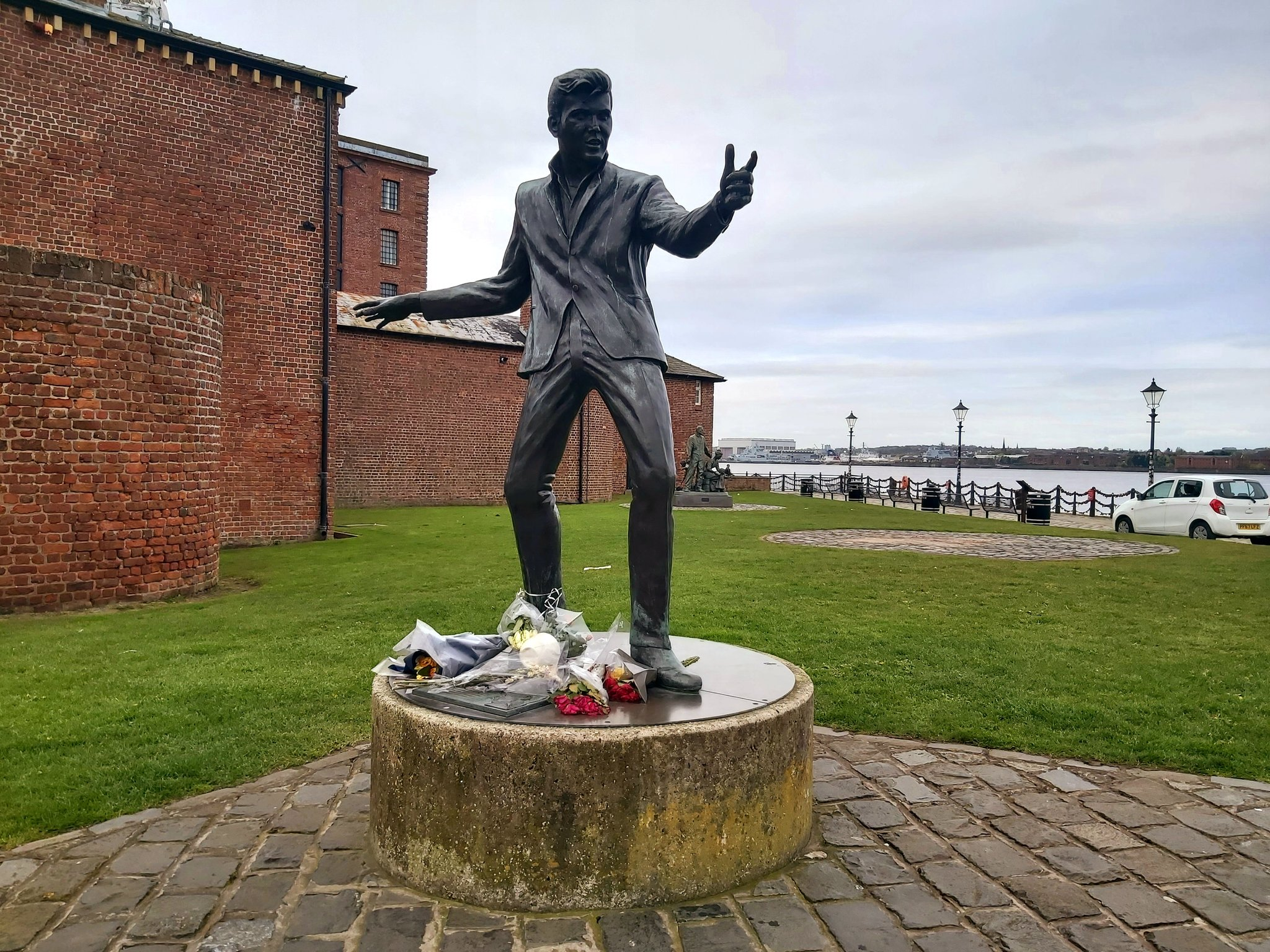
Statue by Tom Murphy at the Albert Dock, (picture taken in April 2024)

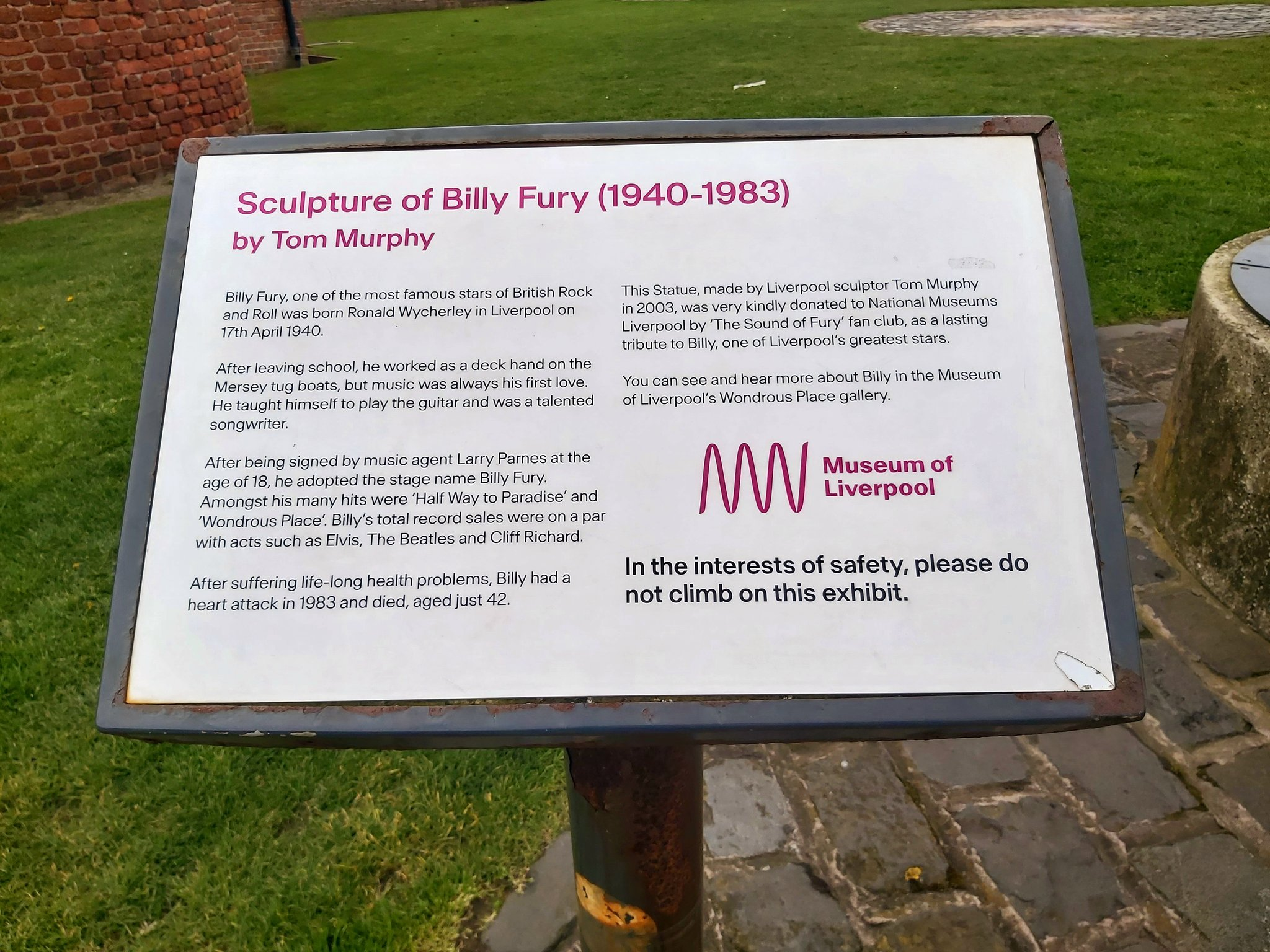
The statue's plaque, featuring a small biography about Fury's life

In 1999, a TV documentary about Fury called Halfway to Paradise was broadcast on the BBC channel, narrated by Ian Dury. Between 1999 and 2000, the song "Wondrous Place", a favourite of Fury's (he re-recorded it at least three times during his career), later received wide airplay on British television when it was used as the theme for a Toyota Yaris car advertisement. In 2005, Spencer Leigh from BBC Radio Merseyside published a biography book about Fury called Wondrous Face – The Billy Fury Story. In 2008, a biographical documentary film Billy Fury: His Wondrous Story was released on DVD.

On 19 April 2003, a bronze statue of Fury was unveiled by Jack Good at the National Museum of Liverpool Life. The sculpture, by Tom Murphy, a Liverpool sculptor, was donated by 'The Sound of Fury' fan club after the money was raised by fans.

In 2010, Camden Council named a previously unnamed alleyway "Billy Fury Way" in his honour. It starts off Finchley Road near Finchley Road & Frognal station and runs to West Hampstead Station. He had recorded at the nearby Decca Studios. The alleyway was decorated with a large mural of his face (at the West Hampstead end), which was unveiled and blessed on 29 July 2011.

Eight of Fury's EMI recordings remained unreleased on mainstream CD until June 2010, when they appeared on a 29-track issue, The Complete Parlophone Singles, released by Peaksoft (PEA009). The singer's estate licensed the tracks to benefit his memorial fund, which finances equipment purchases for hospital heart units. In November 2011, further co-operation between the estate and Peaksoft resulted in the issuing of a second CD, The Lost Album (PEA014), which attempted to construct the format of an album recorded by Fury in 1967–71, but which was never released.

Fury's backing band from 1970 until 1976, when he stopped touring due to ill health, were Fury's Tornados, named by Fury and his then manager Hal Carter. They continue to tour in the theatre show Halfway to Paradise: The Billy Fury Story. Fury is also remembered in the work of tribute bands such as another theatre show called The Billy Fury Years. The film Play It Cool was first released on DVD on 10 February 2014.

== References in popular culture ==
- Fury's life was dramatised for BBC Radio 4 in 1994 as a play called The Sound of Fury, written by Mike Walker and starred Anton Lesser as Fury.
- Rock band Devilish Presley recorded a song "Billy Fury is Dead" on their 2008 album Flesh Ride. They were interviewed about it in the "Tributes" section of the official Fury website.
- Bernie Taupin included the song "Billy Fury" on his album Tribe, released in 1986. Sound effects at the beginning of the song gave the impression that it is being played on a jukebox, the "imaginary" vocalist sang about his desire to "be like Billy Fury" and have the trappings of a rock singer. Long-time Taupin collaborator Elton John appeared towards the end of the song, contributing some backing vocals.
- In 1987, Fury was featured on the cover of the Smiths' last single, "Last Night I Dreamt That Somebody Loved Me".
- Mark Knopfler mentions Fury in "We Can Get Wild" from his 2007 album Kill to Get Crimson.
- In the 2009 film Telstar: The Joe Meek Story, Fury was played by Jon Lee.

== Discography ==
- The Sound of Fury (1960)
- Billy Fury (1960)
- Halfway to Paradise (1961)
- Billy (1963)
- The Golden Years (1979), re-released in 1983 as Memories
- The One and Only (1983)

== See also ==
- List of people from Merseyside
- List of Decca Records artists
- List of rockabilly musicians
- List of performers on Top of the Pops
