= List of UK top-ten singles in 1962 =

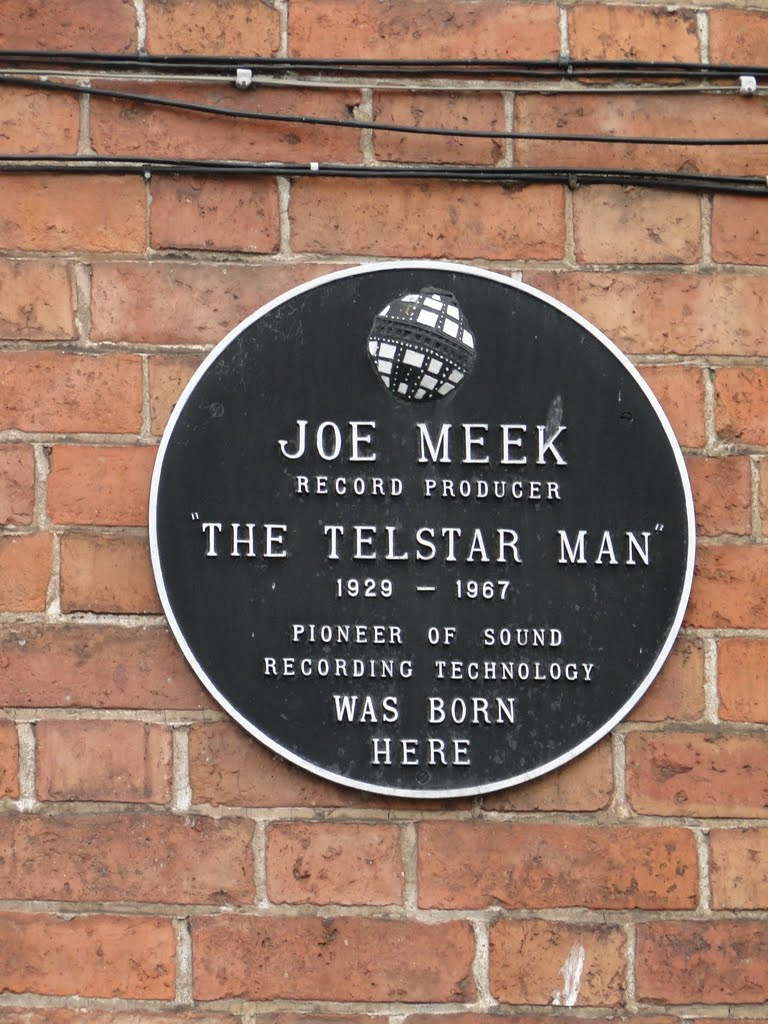
This 2011 photograph shows the original plaque erected at the birthplace in Newent, Gloucestershire of legendary songwriter and producer Joe Meek, best known for writing and producing The Tornados' chart-topping hit "Telstar". The instrumental piece entered the UK top 10 in September 1962 and spent five straight weeks at number-one. It would later become the first song by a British group to top the Billboard Hot 100 chart in the US.

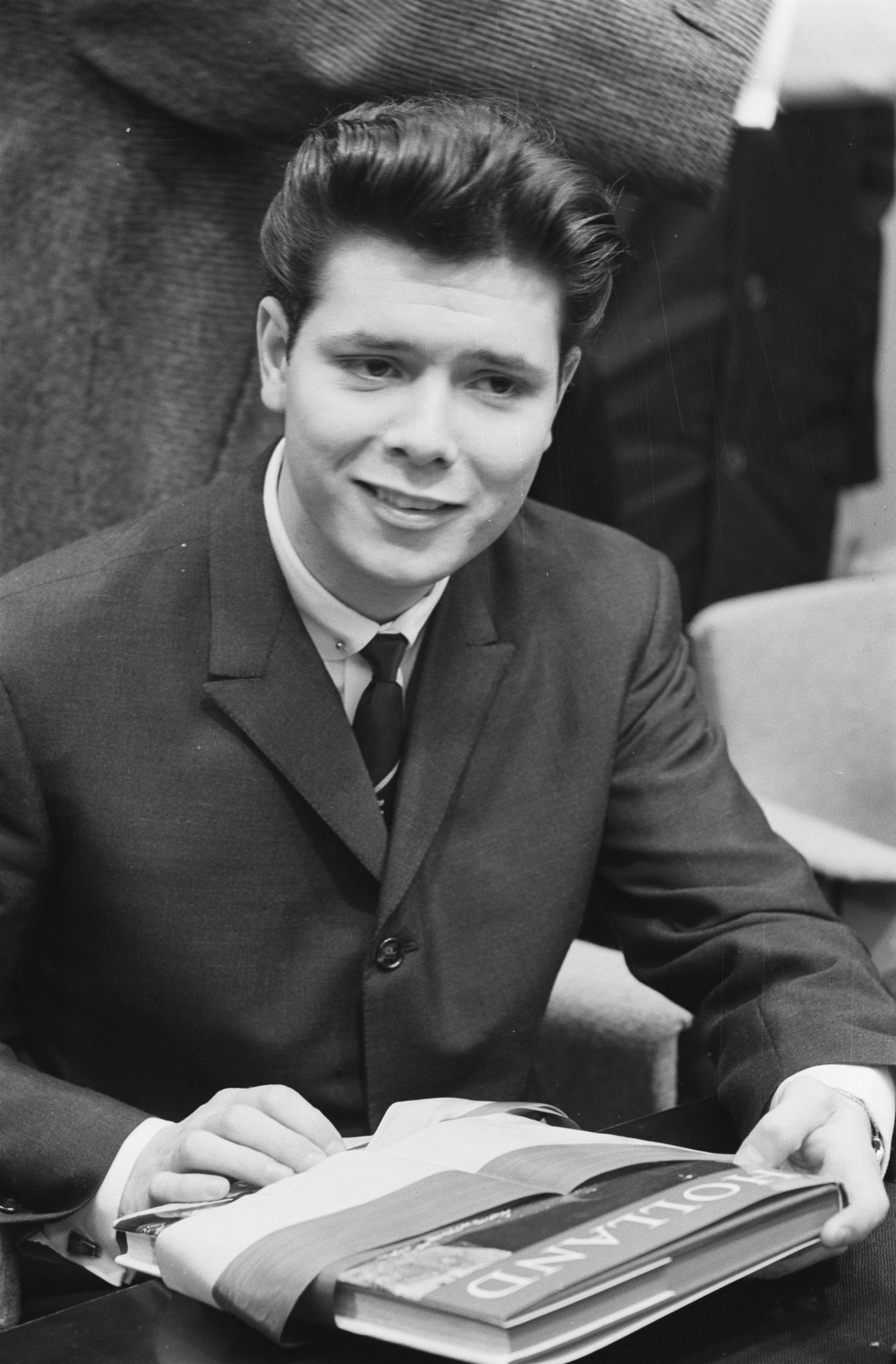
Cliff Richard had four top 10 singles this year, including "The Young Ones", the theme song from his film of the same name, which entered the chart at number-one in January and spent six weeks at the top spot. It remains Richard's biggest-selling single in the UK, with over 1.6 million copies sold there.

The UK Singles Chart is one of many music charts compiled by the Official Charts Company that calculates the best-selling singles of the week in the United Kingdom. Before 2004, the chart was only based on the sales of physical singles. This list shows singles that peaked in the top 10 of the UK Singles Chart during 1962, as well as singles which peaked in 1961 and 1963 but were in the top 10 in 1962. The entry date is when the single appeared in the top 10 for the first time (week ending, as published by the Official Charts Company, which is six days after the chart is announced).

Ninety-two singles were in the top ten in 1962. Eight singles from 1961 remained in the top 10 for several weeks at the beginning of the year, while "The Next Time"/"Bachelor Boy" by Cliff Richard and The Shadows and "Dance On!" by The Shadows were both released in 1962 but did not reach their peak until 1963. "Midnight in Moscow" by Kenny Ball & His Jazzmen, "Stranger on the Shore" by Mr. Acker Bilk, "Let There Be Drums" by Sandy Nelson and "Happy Birthday Sweet Sixteen" by Neil Sedaka were the singles from 1961 to reach their peak in 1962. Twenty-three artists scored multiple entries in the top 10 in 1962. Chubby Checker, The Four Seasons, Frank Ifield, Joe Brown & the Bruvvers and Tommy Roe were among the many artists who achieved their first UK charting top 10 single in 1962.

The 1961 Christmas number-one, "Moon River" by Danny Williams, remained at number one for the first week of 1962. The first new number-one single of the year was "The Young Ones" by Cliff Richard and The Shadows. Overall, twelve different singles peaked at number-one in 1962, with Elvis Presley (4) having the most singles hit that position.

== Background ==
=== Multiple entries ===
Ninety-two singles charted in the top 10 in 1962, with eighty-six singles reaching their peak this year. "When My Little Girl is Smiling" was recorded by Craig Douglas and Jimmy Justice and both versions reached the top 10.

Twenty-three artists scored multiple entries in the top 10 in 1962. The Shadows secured the record for most top 10 hits in 1962 with six hit singles, four of which were with Cliff Richard.

Frank Ifield was one of a number of artists with two top-ten entries, including the number-one single "I Remember You". Adam Faith, Bobby Darin, Duane Eddy, Karl Denver and Neil Sedaka were among the other artists who had multiple top 10 entries in 1962.

=== Chart debuts ===
Twenty-six artists achieved their first top 10 single in 1962, either as a lead or featured artist. Bernard Cribbins, Frank Ifield and Jimmy Justice all had one other entry in their breakthrough year.

The following table (collapsed on desktop site) does not include acts who had previously charted as part of a group and secured their first top 10 solo single.

Artist	Number of top 10s	First entry	Chart position	Other entries
Leroy Van Dyke	1	"Walk On By"	5	—
Chubby Checker	1	"Let's Twist Again"	2	—
Burl Ives	1	"A Little Bitty Tear"	9	—
Dion	1	"The Wanderer"	10	—
Bernard Cribbins	2	"The Hole in the Ground"	9	"Right Said Fred" (10)
Bruce Channel	1	"Hey! Baby"	2	—
Johnny Keating & His Orchestra	1	"Theme from Z-Cars"	2	—
B. Bumble and the Stingers	1	"Nut Rocker"	1	—
Ketty Lester	1	"Love Letters"	4	—
Jimmy Justice	2	"When My Little Girl is Smiling"	9	"Ain't That Funny" (8)
Mike Sarne	1	"Come Outside"	1	—
Wendy Richard	1	"Come Outside"	1	—
Joe Brown & the Bruvvers	1	"A Picture of You"	2	—
Eydie Gormé	1	"Yes, My Darling Daughter"	10	—
Frank Ifield	2	"I Remember You"	1	"Lovesick Blues" (1)
Ronnie Carroll	1	"Roses Are Red (My Love)"	3	—
The Tornados	1	"Telstar"	1	—
Tommy Roe	1	"Sheila"	3	—
Little Eva	1	"The Loco-Motion"	2	—
Carole King	1	"It Might as Well Rain Until September"	3	—
Mark Wynter	1	"Venus in Blue Jeans"	4	—
Chris Montez	1	"Let's Dance"	2	—
The Four Seasons	1	"Sherry"	8	—
Susan Maughan	1	"Bobby's Girl"	3	—
Marty Robbins	1	"Devil Woman"	5	—
The Rebelettes	1	"(Dance with the) Guitar Man"	4	—

Notes

British vocal group The Tornados were Billy Fury's backing group from the start of this year until August 1963 but they did not receive specific credit for these recordings. Their first official chart credit was "Telstar" under their own name.

The Rebelettes, who backed Duane Eddy on "(Dance with the) Guitar Man", were actually The Blossoms, a girl group consisting of Darlene Love, Fanita James, and Jean King.

=== Songs from films ===
Original songs from various films entered the top 10 throughout the year. These included "The Young Ones" (from The Young Ones), "Rock-A-Hula Baby" and "Can't Help Falling in Love" (Blue Hawaii), "The Ballad of Paladin" (The Wild Westerners), "The Next Time" and "Bachelor Boy" (Summer Holiday).

Additionally, the original version of "Love Letters" was nominated for the Academy Award for Best Original Song after being used in the film of the same name (losing out to "It Might As Well Be Spring" from State Fair). "The Green Leaves of Summer" was also Academy Award-nominated, appearing in the 1960 film The Alamo, where it was performed by The Brothers Four.

=== Best-selling singles ===
Until 1970 there was no universally recognised year-end best-sellers list. However, in 2011 the Official Charts Company released a list of the best-selling single of each year in chart history from 1952 to date. According to the list, "I Remember You" by Frank Ifield is officially recorded as the biggest-selling single of 1962.

== Top-ten singles ==
Key

Symbol	Meaning
‡	Single peaked in 1961 but still in chart in 1962.
♦	Single released in 1962 but peaked in 1963.
(#)	Year-end best-selling single.
Entered	The date that the single first appeared in the chart.
Peak	Highest position that the single reached in the UK Singles Chart.

Entered (week ending)	Weeks in top 10	Single	Artist	Peak	Peak reached (week ending)	Weeks at peak
Singles in 1961
23 November 1961	7	"Tower of Strength" ‡	Frankie Vaughan	1	7 December 1961	3
23 November 1961	9	"Moon River" ‡	Danny Williams	1	28 December 1961	2
7 December 1961	9	"Midnight in Moscow"	Kenny Ball & His Jazzmen	2	4 January 1962	1
21 December 1961	5	"Johnny Will" ‡	Pat Boone	4	21 December 1961	2
21 December 1961	17	"Stranger on the Shore" ^{[A]}	Mr. Acker Bilk	2	11 January 1962	3
28 December 1961	6	"Let There Be Drums"	Sandy Nelson	3	4 January 1962	2
28 December 1961	2	"Toy Balloons" ‡	Russ Conway	7	28 December 1961	1
28 December 1961	8	"Happy Birthday Sweet Sixteen"	Neil Sedaka	3	25 January 1962	2
Singles in 1962
4 January 1962	6	"Multiplication"	Bobby Darin	5	25 January 1962	1
4 January 1962	9	"I'd Never Find Another You"	Billy Fury	5	11 January 1962	1
11 January 1962	11	"The Young Ones"	Cliff Richard & The Shadows	1	11 January 1962	6
11 January 1962	1	"So Long, Baby"	Del Shannon	10	11 January 1962	1
18 January 1962	4	"Run to Him" ^{[B]}	Bobby Vee	6	15 February 1962	2
25 January 1962	8	"Forget Me Not"	Eden Kane	3	8 February 1962	2
25 January 1962	8	"Walk On By"	Leroy Van Dyke	5	8 February 1962	3
1 February 1962	9	"Let's Twist Again"	Chubby Checker	2	1 February 1962	2
8 February 1962	13	"Rock-A-Hula Baby"/"Can't Help Falling in Love"	Elvis Presley	1	22 February 1962	4
8 February 1962	5	"Crying in the Rain"	The Everly Brothers	6	1 March 1962	1
22 February 1962	8	"Wimoweh"	Karl Denver	4	8 March 1962	1
22 February 1962	2	"A Little Bitty Tear"	Burl Ives	9	22 February 1962	2
1 March 1962	5	"March of the Siamese Children"	Kenny Ball & His Jazzmen	4	22 March 1962	1
8 March 1962	9	"Tell Me What He Said"	Helen Shapiro	2	22 March 1962	3
8 March 1962	14	"Wonderful Land"	The Shadows	1	22 March 1962	8
22 March 1962	8	"Dream Baby (How Long Must I Dream)"	Roy Orbison	2	12 April 1962	2
22 March 1962	1	"The Wanderer"	Dion	10	22 March 1962	1
29 March 1962	3	"The Hole in the Ground"	Bernard Cribbins	9	29 March 1962	2
29 March 1962	2	"Softly, as I Leave You"	Matt Monro	10	29 March 1962	2
5 April 1962	4	"Twistin' the Night Away"	Sam Cooke	6	12 April 1962	1
5 April 1962	8	"Hey! Little Girl"	Del Shannon	2	3 May 1962	1
12 April 1962	6	"Hey! Baby"	Bruce Channel	2	26 April 1962	1
19 April 1962	1	"Theme from Z-Cars"	Johnny Keating	8	19 April 1962	1
19 April 1962	4	"Never Goodbye"	Karl Denver	9	19 April 1962	2
19 April 1962	2	"When My Little Girl is Smiling"	Craig Douglas	9	26 April 1962	1
26 April 1962	5	"Speak to Me Pretty"	Brenda Lee	3	10 May 1962	1
3 May 1962	9	"Nut Rocker"	B. Bumble and the Stingers	1	17 May 1962	1
10 May 1962	4	"Love Letters"	Ketty Lester	4	24 May 1962	1
10 May 1962	1	"Wonderful World of the Young"	Danny Williams	8	10 May 1962	1
10 May 1962	1	"The Party's Over"	Lonnie Donegan	9	10 May 1962	1
17 May 1962	11	"Good Luck Charm"	Elvis Presley	1	24 May 1962	5
17 May 1962	10	"I'm Looking out the Window"/"Do You Want to Dance" ^{[C]}	Cliff Richard	2	31 May 1962	3
17 May 1962	6	"As You Like It"	Adam Faith	5	24 May 1962	3
17 May 1962	2	"When My Little Girl is Smiling"	Jimmy Justice	9	17 May 1962	2
24 May 1962	9	"Ginny Come Lately"	Brian Hyland	5	21 June 1962	4
31 May 1962	5	"Last Night Was Made for Love"	Billy Fury	4	31 May 1962	1
31 May 1962	11	"Come Outside"	Mike Sarne featuring Wendy Richard	1	28 June 1962	2
31 May 1962	4	"I Don't Know Why"	Eden Kane	7	14 June 1962	2
7 June 1962	11	"A Picture of You"	Joe Brown & the Bruvvers	2	28 June 1962	2
14 June 1962	3	"Green Leaves of Summer" ^{[D]}	Kenny Ball & His Jazzmen	7	5 July 1962	1
28 June 1962	5	"English Country Garden" ^{[E]}	Jimmie Rodgers	5	19 July 1962	1
28 June 1962	11	"I Can't Stop Loving You"	Ray Charles	1	12 July 1962	2
5 July 1962	2	"Ain't That Funny"	Jimmy Justice	8	5 July 1962	1
5 July 1962	1	"Sharing You"	Bobby Vee	10	5 July 1962	1
12 July 1962	5	"Here Comes That Feeling"	Brenda Lee	5	26 July 1962	1
12 July 1962	1	"Yes, My Darling Daughter"	Eydie Gormé	10	12 July 1962	1
19 July 1962	14	"I Remember You" (#1)	Frank Ifield	1	26 July 1962	7
19 July 1962	2	"Our Favourite Melodies"	Craig Douglas	9	19 July 1962	1
26 July 1962	9	"Speedy Gonzales"	Pat Boone	2	9 August 1962	4
26 July 1962	5	"Don't Ever Change"	The Crickets	5	2 August 1962	2
2 August 1962	3	"Little Miss Lonely"	Helen Shapiro	8	2 August 1962	1
2 August 1962	1	"Right Said Fred"	Bernard Cribbins	10	2 August 1962	1
9 August 1962	7	"Guitar Tango"	The Shadows	4	16 August 1962	3
9 August 1962	8	"Things"	Bobby Darin	2	6 September 1962	1
16 August 1962	4	"Once Upon a Dream"	Billy Fury	7	16 August 1962	3
16 August 1962	7	"Roses Are Red (My Love)"	Ronnie Carroll	3	13 September 1962	1
23 August 1962	7	"Sealed with a Kiss"	Brian Hyland	3	6 September 1962	1
23 August 1962	6	"Breaking Up Is Hard to Do"	Neil Sedaka	7	6 September 1962	2
30 August 1962	1	"Vacation"	Connie Francis	10	30 August 1962	1
6 September 1962	9	"She's Not You"	Elvis Presley	1	13 September 1962	3
13 September 1962	6	"It'll Be Me"	Cliff Richard & The Shadows	2	27 September 1962	1
13 September 1962	1	"The Ballad of Paladin"	Duane Eddy	10	13 September 1962	1
20 September 1962	4	"Don't That Beat All"	Adam Faith	8	27 September 1962	1
27 September 1962	16	"Telstar" ^{[F]}	The Tornados	1	4 October 1962	5
27 September 1962	8	"Sheila"	Tommy Roe	3	11 October 1962	2
4 October 1962	9	"The Loco-Motion"	Little Eva	2	11 October 1962	3
4 October 1962	6	"It Might as Well Rain Until September"	Carole King	3	18 October 1962	1
4 October 1962	3	"You Don't Know Me"	Ray Charles	9	4 October 1962	2
11 October 1962	3	"What Now My Love?"	Shirley Bassey	5	18 October 1962	1
18 October 1962	5	"Ramblin' Rose"	Nat King Cole	5	25 October 1962	1
25 October 1962	6	"Venus in Blue Jeans"	Mark Wynter	4	1 November 1962	1
25 October 1962	10	"Let's Dance" ^{[G]}	Chris Montez	2	1 November 1962	4
25 October 1962	9	"The Swiss Maid"	Del Shannon	2	29 November 1962	1
1 November 1962	12	"Lovesick Blues"	Frank Ifield	1	8 November 1962	5
8 November 1962	4	"Sherry" ^{[H]}	The Four Seasons	8	22 November 1962	1
15 November 1962	9	"Bobby's Girl"	Susan Maughan	3	29 November 1962	1
22 November 1962	5	"Devil Woman"	Marty Robbins	5	29 November 1962	1
22 November 1962	10	"(Dance with the) Guitar Man"	Duane Eddy & The Rebelettes ^{[I]}	4	27 December 1962	2
29 November 1962	8	"Sun Arise"	Rolf Harris	3	13 December 1962	1
6 December 1962	9	"Return to Sender"	Elvis Presley	1	13 December 1962	3
13 December 1962	11	"The Next Time"/"Bachelor Boy" ♦	Cliff Richard & The Shadows	1	3 January 1963	3
20 December 1962	2	"Rockin' Around the Christmas Tree"	Brenda Lee	6	27 December 1962	1
27 December 1962	7	"Dance On!" ♦	The Shadows	1	24 January 1963	1

== Entries by artist ==
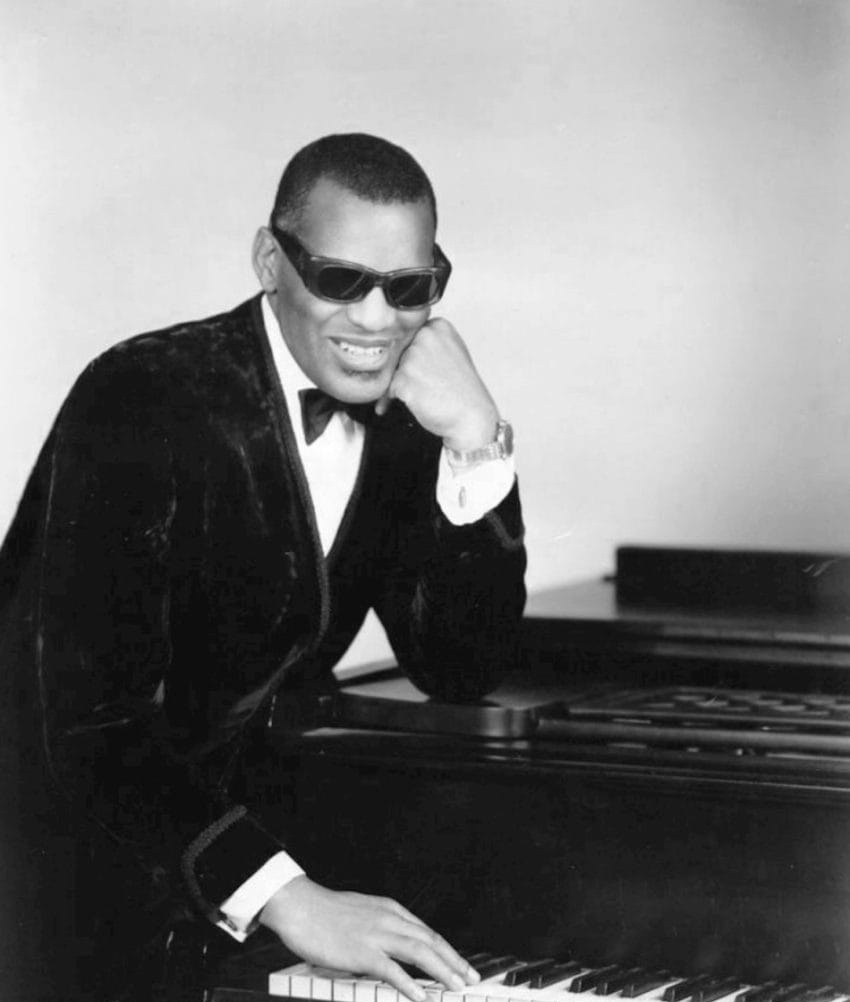
Ray Charles scored two top 10 entries in 1962, including his only UK number-one single, "I Can't Stop Loving You", which topped the chart for two weeks in July.

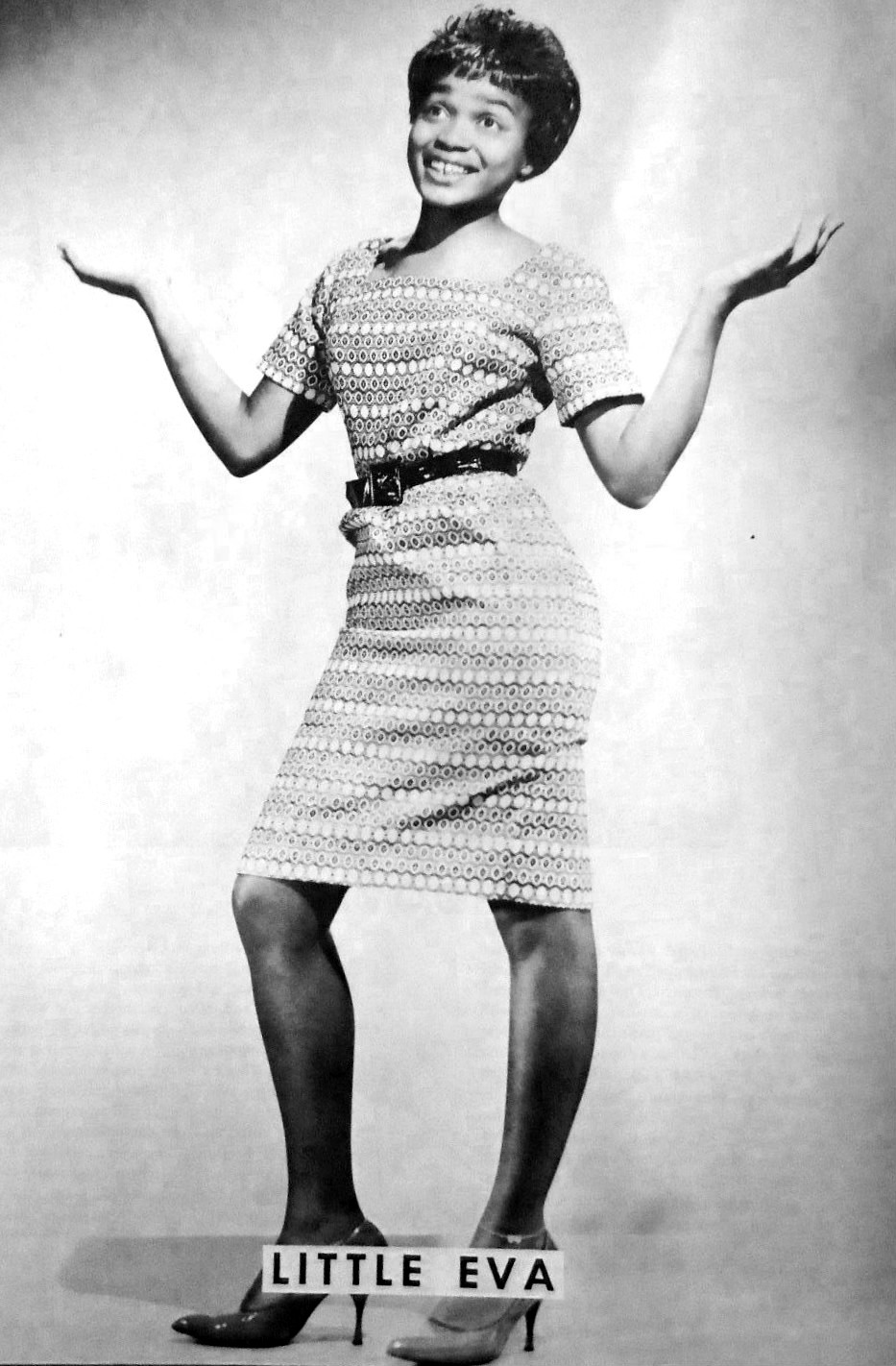
Little Eva was only 19 years old when her hit "The Loco-Motion" peaked at number two in the UK in October of this year.

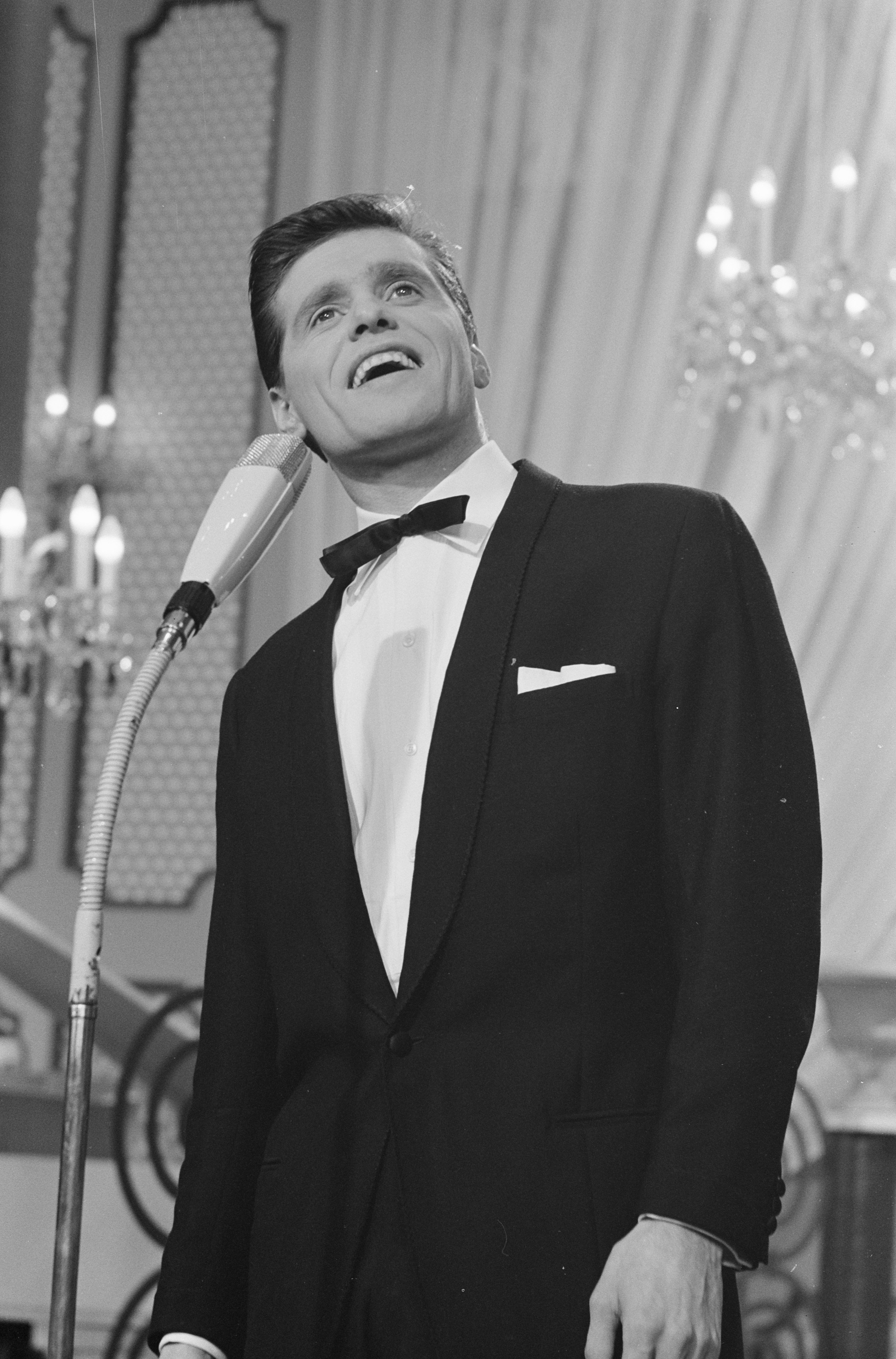
Northern Irish singer Ronnie Carroll reached number three in September 1962 with his cover version of Bobby Vinton's "Roses Are Red (My Love)".

The following table shows artists who achieved two or more top 10 entries in 1962, including singles that reached their peak in 1961 or 1963. The figures include both main artists and featured artists. The total number of weeks an artist spent in the top ten in 1962 is also shown.

Entries	Artist	Weeks	Singles
6	The Shadows ^{[J]}	50	"Guitar Tango", "Do You Want to Dance", "It'll Be Me", "The Next Time"/"Bachelor Boy", "The Young Ones", "Wonderful Land", "Dance On!"
4	Cliff Richard ^{[J]}	29	"I'm Looking out the Window"/"Do You Want to Dance", "It'll Be Me", "The Next Time"/"Bachelor Boy", "The Young Ones"
4	Elvis Presley	36	"Good Luck Charm", "Return to Sender", "Rock-A-Hula Baby"/"Can't Help Falling in Love", "She's Not You"
3	Billy Fury	17	"I'd Never Find Another You", "Last Night Was Made for Love", "Once Upon a Dream"
3	Brenda Lee ^{[J]}	11	"Here Comes That Feeling", "Rockin' Around the Christmas Tree", "Speak to Me Pretty"
3	Del Shannon	18	"Hey! Little Girl", "So Long, Baby", "The Swiss Maid"
3	Kenny Ball & His Jazzmen ^{[L]}	14	"Green Leaves of Summer", "March of the Siamese Children", "Midnight in Moscow"
2	Adam Faith	10	"As You Like It", "Don't That Beat All"
2	Bernard Cribbins	4	"Right Said Fred", "The Hole in the Ground"
2	Bobby Darin	14	"Multiplication", "Things"
2	Bobby Vee ^{[K]}	6	"Run to Him", "Sharing You"
2	Brian Hyland	16	"Ginny Come Lately", "Sealed with a Kiss"
2	Craig Douglas	4	"Our Favourite Melodies", "When My Little Girl is Smiling"
2	Danny Williams	5	"Moon River", "Wonderful World of the Young"
2	Duane Eddy ^{[J]}	6	"(Dance with the) Guitar Man", "The Ballad of Paladin"
2	Eden Kane	12	"Forget Me Not", "I Don't Know Why"
2	Frank Ifield	22	"I Remember You", "Lovesick Blues"
2	Helen Shapiro	12	"Little Miss Lonely", "Tell Me What He Said"
2	Jimmy Justice	4	"Ain't That Funny", "When My Little Girl is Smiling"
2	Karl Denver	12	"Never Goodbye", "Wimoweh"
2	Neil Sedaka	14	"Breaking Up Is Hard to Do", "Happy Birthday Sweet Sixteen"
2	Pat Boone ^{[K]}	13	"Johnny Will", "Speedy Gonzales"
2	Ray Charles	14	"I Can't Stop Loving You", "You Don't Know Me"

== Notes ==
- ^{a} "Stranger on the Shore" re-entered the top 10 at number 8 on 15 March 1962 (week ending) for 5 weeks, at number 10 on 3 May 1962 (week ending) and at number 9 on 28 June 1962 (week ending) for 2 weeks.
- ^{b} "Run to Him" re-entered the top 10 at number 6 on 15 February 1962 (week ending) for 2 weeks.
- ^{c} The Shadows appear alongside Cliff Richard on "Do You Want to Dance".
- ^{d} "Green Leaves of Summer" re-entered the top 10 at number 7 on 5 July 1962 (week ending).
- ^{e} "English Country Garden" re-entered the top 10 at number 8 on 12 July (week ending) for 4 weeks.
- ^{f} "Telstar" re-entered the top 10 at number 10 on 17 January 1963 (week ending).
- ^{g} "Let's Dance" re-entered the top 10 at number 10 on 27 December 1962 (week ending) for 2 weeks.
- ^{h} "Sherry" re-entered the top 10 at number 10 on 6 December 1962 (week ending).
- ^{i} The Rebelettes were actually The Blossoms, a girl group consisting of Darlene Love, Fanita James, and Jean King.
- ^{j} Figure includes single that peaked in 1963.
- ^{k} Figure includes single that peaked in 1961.
- ^{l} Figure includes single that first charted in 1961 but peaked in 1962.

== See also ==
- 1962 in British music
- List of number-one singles from the 1960s (UK)
