= $1,000,000 Worth of Twang =

Compilation album by Duane Eddy
- Released: 1960
- Genres: Instrumental rock, rock and roll
- Label: Jamie
- Producers: Lee Hazlewood, Lester Sill

$1,000,000 Worth of Twang is a compilation album by guitarist Duane Eddy.

== Chart performance ==
The album was released in 1960 on Jamie Records (catalog no. JLP-70-3014). It entered Billboard magazine's pop album chart on December 26, 1960, peaked at No. 10, and remained on the chart for nine weeks. It was one of only two Duane Eddy albums to enter the top 10, the other being Have 'Twangy' Guitar Will Travel.

The popularity of the album led to the 1961 release of "$1,000,000 Worth of Twang, Vol. II".

== Reviews ==
Professional ratings
Review scores
Source	Rating
AllMusic	4.5/5 stars

At the time of its release in November 1960, music reviewer Gee Mitchell wrote: "'$1,000,000 Worth of Twang' (Jamie) stirs up action aplenty on things like 'Rebel Rouser', 'Moovin' and Groovin',' and 'Because They're Young.' But, better turn the volume down a notch or two."

AllMusic gave the album a rating of four-and-a-half stars, with reviewer Cub Koda calling it a "solid best-of collection". The Encyclopedia of Popular Music also gave the album a rating of four stars.

In January and February 2017, the ARChive of Contemporary Music featured "$1,000,000 Worth of Twang" in its window with web site commentary by head archivist Fred Patterson. Patterson described the album as "our own idea of what is worth a million dollars. . . a compilation of Duane Eddy's biggest hits up until 1960, hanging in our window to remind folks about the important things in life. Yes. Twang!"

== Track listing ==
Side A

1. "Rebel Rouser" [2:02]
2. "Cannonball" [1:52]
3. "The Quiet Three" [1:57]
4. "Bonnie Came Back" [1:59]
5. "Because They're Young" [1:59]
6. "Theme for Moon Children" [2:15]

Side B

1. "Moovin' 'n Groovin'" [2:03]
2. "The Lonely One" [1:40]
3. "Forty Miles of Bad Road" [2:10]
4. "Some Kind-a Earthquake" [1:17]
5. "First Love, First Tears" [2:05]
6. "Kommotion" [2:25]
