= Jesse James (singer) =

American soul singer (born 1943)

- Also known as: Jessie James
- Born: James Herbert McClelland; October 3, 1943 (age 82); Louisiana or El Dorado, Arkansas, U.S.
- Genres: Soul
- Occupation: Singer
- Years active: c.1961–present
- Labels: Shirley, Hit, 20th Century Fox, Uni, Zea, Zay, TTED, Gunsmoke

Jesse James (born James Herbert McClelland, October 3, 1943) is an American soul singer who had several minor US hits from the late 1960s to the late 1980s, and has continued to record since then.

== Biography ==
Most sources state that he was born in El Dorado, Arkansas, but in one interview he gave his home state as nearby Louisiana. He moved to the Bay Area in California as a young child. In his late teens, while working in a chemical factory, he began singing in nightclubs in Richmond, and was given his stage name by a compere who struggled to announce his real name.

Initially credited as Jessie James, he recorded several singles in the early 1960s on the Shirley label before moving to the Hit label where some of his recordings featured guitar by Sly Stewart (later Sly Stone). His first commercial success came in 1967 when one of his recordings for Hit, "Believe in Me Baby", was reissued by 20th Century Fox Records, and reached No. 42 on the Billboard R&B chart and No. 92 on the Pop chart. The song was credited to Jesse James & the Dynamic Four, was produced by Jesse Mason Jr., and was co-written by James with Sugar Pie DeSanto, Shena Demell, and Jesse Anderson.

Later recordings for 20th Century Fox, to which he was signed by Hosea Wilson, failed to chart, but he released a self-titled LP on the label in 1968, also produced by Mason. After one single on Uni, he set up his own label, Zea, distributed by Roulette Records. His first single for the new label, the self-penned "Don't Nobody Want to Get Married", reached No. 18 on the R&B chart in 1970, and its follow-up, "I Need You Baby", reached No. 47 R&B. After Zea's distribution deal ended, he re-launched the label as Zay, and had another R&B hit (No. 25) with his version of "At Last", arranged and produced by Willie Hoskins and previously a hit for Etta James. In 1974, he returned to the 20th Century label, and the following year had a minor R&B hit (No. 73) with "If You Want a Love Affair".

He continued to record for various labels through the 1970s and 1980s, and his final chart success came in 1987, when "I Can Do Bad By Myself", on the TTED label, reached No. 61 on the R&B chart. He released one album on TTED, It Takes One to Know One (credited as Mr. Jessie James), followed by several on Gunsmoke, for whom he signed in 1988. His first album on Gunsmoke, I Can Do Bad by Myself (1988), included a collaboration with Harvey Scales, and was followed by Looking Back (1990). He has continued to release albums on Gunsmoke, including Operator Please Put Me Through (1993), It Just Don't Feel the Same (1997), Versatility (1998), It's Not So Bad After All (2006), Get in Touch with Me (2009), Do Not Disturb (2012), and I Lost My Baby on Facebook (2014).

He is sometimes confused with the Philadelphia songwriter and record producer Jesse James, who wrote "Boogaloo Down Broadway" for the Fantastic Johnny C and "The Horse" for Cliff Nobles.
