= Some Kind-a Earthquake =

Single by Duane Eddy

from the album $1,000,000 Worth of Twang
- B-side: "First Love, First Tears"
- Released: October 1959
- Genre: Rockabilly
- Length: 1:17
- Label: Jamie Records 1130
- Songwriter(s): Duane Eddy, Lee Hazlewood
- Producer(s): Lee Hazlewood, Lester Sill

Duane Eddy singles chronology
"Forty Miles of Bad Road" (1959)	"Some Kind-a Earthquake" (1959)	"Bonnie Came Back" (1959)

"Some Kind-a Earthquake" is a song written by Duane Eddy and Lee Hazlewood and performed by Eddy. The song reached #12 on the UK Singles Chart and #37 on the Billboard Hot 100 in 1959. The song appeared on his 1960 album, $1,000,000 Worth of Twang.

The single's B-side, "First Love, First Tears", reached #59 on the Billboard Hot 100.

In Canada the A and B sides were co-charted and reached #21.

The song was produced by Lee Hazlewood and Lester Sill.

At 1:17, it is the shortest song to have ever hit the Billboard Top 40, or indeed the Top 75. In the UK, the song was also believed, as of 1991, to be the shortest ever to chart.
