= Jesse James (disambiguation) =

Jesse James (1847–1882) was an American outlaw.

Jesse James may also refer to:

== People ==
- Jesse James (Pennsylvania politician) (1794–1875), American politician from Pennsylvania
- Jesse E. James (1875–1951), son of American outlaw Jesse James
- Jesse James (Texas politician) (1904–1977), Texas State Treasurer
- Jesse James (singer) (born James McClelland, 1943), American soul singer
- Jesse James (songwriter), writer of the 1968 hit instrumental "The Horse"
- Jesse James (television personality) (born 1969), American custom vehicle manufacturer and television personality
- Jesse James (wrestler) (born 1969), American professional wrestler best known as "Road Dogg" Jesse James
- Jesse James (Wisconsin politician) (born 1972), member of the Wisconsin State Assembly
- Jesse James (actor) (born 1989), American actor
- Jesse James Dupree (born 1962), musician
- Jesse James Keitel, American actress, writer, and artist
- Jesse James, alias of spammer Davis Wolfgang Hawke

=== Athletes ===
- Jeff James (baseball) (1941–2006), American baseball player
- Jesse James (center) (born 1971), American football center
- Jesse James (tight end) (born 1994), American football tight end
- John James (footballer, born 1948) (1948–2021), English footballer
- "Road Dogg" Jesse James (born 1969), American professional wrestler

== Arts and entertainment ==
=== Film ===
- Jesse James (1927 film), a Paramount silent film
- Jesse James (1939 film), starring Tyrone Power and Henry Fonda
- Jesse James, Jr. (film), a 1942 American Western film

=== Music ===
- "Jesse James" (folk song), a 19th-century American folk song
- "Jesse James" (Clay Walker song), a 2012 song by Clay Walker
- "Jesse James", a song by the Kooks from 10 Tracks to Echo in the Dark (2022)

== Other uses ==
- Jesse James (Lucky Luke), a 1969 Lucky Luke comic title
- The Jesse James Gang, a political group led by Bill Ayers and Diana Oughton

== See also ==
- Jesse Jaymes, American rapper and entrepreneur
- Jessie James (born 1988), American singer now known as Jessie James Decker
  - Jessie James (album), 2009, by Jessie James
- Jessie and James, characters in the Pokémon anime television series
- Jessica James (disambiguation)
