= Yep! =

Single by Duane Eddy

from the album Especially for You
- B-side: "Three-30-Blues"
- Released: March 1959
- Genre: Rockabilly
- Length: 2:04
- Label: Jamie
- Songwriter(s): Duane Eddy, Lee Hazlewood
- Producer(s): Lee Hazlewood, Lester Sill

Duane Eddy singles chronology
| "Peter Gunn" (1959) | "Yep!" (1959) | "Forty Miles of Bad Road" (1959) |

"Yep!" is a song written by Duane Eddy and Lee Hazlewood and performed by Eddy. The song reached #12 on the Canadian charts, #17 on the UK Singles Chart, and #30 on the Billboard Hot 100 in 1959. The song appeared on his 1959 album, Especially for You.

The song was produced by Lee Hazlewood and Lester Sill.

== Other versions ==
- The Surfaris released a version as part of an EP in October 1963.
