= Kommotion (song) =

Single by Duane Eddy

from the album $1,000,000 Worth of Twang
- B-side: "Theme for Moon Children"
- Released: August 1960
- Genre: Rockabilly
- Length: 2:25
- Label: Jamie Records 1163
- Songwriter(s): Duane Eddy, Lee Hazlewood
- Producer(s): Lee Hazlewood, Lester Sill

Duane Eddy singles chronology
"Because They're Young" (1960)	"Kommotion" (1960)	"Pepe" (1960)

"Kommotion" is a song written by Duane Eddy and Lee Hazlewood and performed by Eddy. The song reached #13 on the UK Singles Chart, #27 in Canada, and #78 on the Billboard Hot 100 in 1960. The song appeared on his 1960 album, $1,000,000 Worth of Twang.

The song was produced by Lee Hazlewood and Lester Sill.
