= The "Twangs" the "Thang" =

Studio album by Duane Eddy
- Released: 1959
- Recorded: November 1959
- Genre: Instrumental rock, surf music
- Label: Jamie
- Producer: Lee Hazlewood, Lester Sill

Duane Eddy chronology
Especially for You (1959)	The "Twangs" the "Thang" (1959)	Songs of Our Heritage (1960)

Professional ratings
Review scores
Source	Rating
Allmusic	2/5 stars

The "Twangs" the "Thang" is a studio album by guitarist Duane Eddy. It was released in 1959 on Jamie Records (catalog no. JLP-70-3009). It entered Billboard magazine's pop album chart on January 25, 1960, peaked at No. 18, and remained on the chart for 13 weeks. It was one of only three Duane Eddy albums to enter the Top 20. It fared better in the UK, reaching No 2 in the album charts and staying in the top 10 for 12 weeks. AllMusic gave the album a rating of two stars.

== Track listing ==
All tracks composed by Duane Eddy and Lee Hazlewood; except where noted.
Side A

1. "My Blue Heaven" (George A. Whiting, Walter Donaldson) – 2:31
2. "Tiger Love and Turnip Greens" – 1:30
3. "The Last Minute of Innocence" – 3:26
4. "Route No. 1" (Duane Eddy, Corkey Casey, Jim Horn) – 1:59
5. "You Are My Sunshine" (Charles Mitchell, Jimmie Davis) – 2:28
6. "St. Louis Blues" (W. C. Handy) – 2:33

Side B

1. "Night Train to Memphis" (Beasley Smith, Marvin Hughes, Owen Bradley) – 2:01
2. "The Battle" – 1:56
3. "Trambone" (Chet Atkins) – 1:37
4. "Blueberry Hill" (Al Lewis, Larry Stock, Vincent Rose) – 3:27
5. "Rebel Walk" – 2:13
6. "Easy" (Wilson) – 3:00

== Personnel ==
Duane Eddy and the Rebels

- Duane Eddy – lead "twangy" guitar
- Corkey Casey, Donnie Owens – rhythm guitar
- Al Casey – bass
- Larry Knechtel – piano
- Jim Troxel – drums
- Jim Horn – saxophone, flute
- Ben Demotto – "rebel yells"
- Evelyn Freeman Singers – backing vocals

Technical

- Eddie Brackett, Jack Miller – sound engineer
- Carl Shaw – artwork (uncredited)
