= Road movie (disambiguation) =

A road movie is a cinematic genre in which the action takes places during a road journey.

Road movie may also refer to:

== Films and video ==
- Road to ..., comedy film series starring Bob Hope, Bing Crosby, and Dorothy Lamour
- Road Movie (2002 film), a South Korean remake of the 1973 film
- Road Movie (1973 film), American film by Joseph Strick
- Road, Movie, 2010 Hindi film, directed by Dev Benegal and starring Abhay Deol
- Road Movie (video), 1996 documentary-style film by rock group R.E.M.
- Road Movies (TV series), a Canadian documentary television series

== Music ==
- "Road Movies" (John Adams), 1995 composition by John Adams
- Road Movies (album), 2001 album by the group LAND
- "Road Movie", song by Asian Kung-Fu Generation

== See also ==
- Road Trip (disambiguation)
- Road Movies Filmproduktion, production company founded by Wim Wenders
