= Especially for You (Duane Eddy album) =

Studio album by Duane Eddy
- Released: May 1959
- Recorded: March 13–20, 1959
- Studio: Audio Recorders, Phoenix, Arizona
- Genre: Instrumental rock
- Length: 47:50
- Label: Jamie
- Producer: Lee Hazlewood, Lester Sill

Duane Eddy chronology
Have 'Twangy' Guitar Will Travel (1958)	Especially for You (1959)	The "Twangs" the "Thang" (1959)

Singles from Especially for You
- 1. "Yep!" Released: March 1959; 2. "Peter Gunn" Released: June 1959 (UK) September 1960 (US)

Professional ratings
Review scores
Source	Rating
Allmusic	3/5 stars

Especially for You is the second album by guitarist Duane Eddy. It was released in 1959. Unlike most albums of the time, it was not built around singles but was a collection of originals and cover material that featured Eddy's guitar playing.

== Track listing ==
All songs written by Duane Eddy and Lee Hazlewood unless noted

1. "Peter Gunn" (Henry Mancini) – 2:30
2. "Only Child" – 3:34
3. "Lover" (Lorenz Hart, Richard Rodgers) – 1:41
4. "Fuzz" – 2:20
5. "Yep!" – 2:14
6. "Along the Navajo Trail" (Dick Charles, Eddie DeLange, Larry Markes) – 2:36
7. "Just Because" (Sydney Robin, Joe Shelton, Bob Shelton) – 2:42
8. "Quiniela" – 5:02
9. "Trouble in Mind" (Richard M. Jones) – 1:51
10. "Tuxedo Junction" (Julian Dash, Buddy Feyne, Erskine Hawkins, William Johnson) – 2:43
11. "Hard Times" (Noble "Thin Man" Watts) – 2:58
12. "Along Came Linda" (Eddy) – 2:34
- 2000 re-release bonus tracks
1. "Only Child" [alternate take] – 2:55
2. "Yep!" [alternate take] – 3:04
3. "St. James" – 5:08
4. "Some Kind-a Earthquake" [alternate take] – 1:47
5. "First Love, First Tears" – 2:11

== Personnel ==
- Duane Eddy – guitar

=== Technical ===
- Lee Hazlewood – producer
- Lester Sill – producer
- Eddie Brackett – engineer
- Jack Miller – engineer
- Tom Moulton – mastering
- Greg Vaughn – mastering

== Chart positions ==
Year	Title	U.S. Billboard 200	UK Albums Chart	Label and catalogue
1958	Especially for You	24	6	Jamie JLPS-3006

=== Singles ===
Year	Titles Both sides from that album except where indicated	Chart positions		
Year	Titles Both sides from that album except where indicated	Billboard	Cashbox	UK
1959	"Yep!" b/w "Three-30-Blues" (from Have "Twangy" Guitar Will Travel)	30	27	17
1960	"Peter Gunn" b/w "Along the Navajo Trail"	27	26	6
