= Ramrod (Duane Eddy song) =

Single by Duane Eddy

from the album Have 'Twangy' Guitar Will Travel
- B-side: "The Walker"
- Released: August 1958
- Genre: Rock and roll, rockabilly, instrumental rock
- Label: Jamie
- Songwriter: Al Casey
- Producers: Lee Hazlewood, Lester Sill

Duane Eddy singles chronology
"Rebel-'Rouser" (1958)	"Ramrod" (1958)	"Cannonball" (1958)

"Ramrod" is a song written by Al Casey and originally released as the A-side of a single released by the obscure Ford record label in Los Angeles in 1957, backed on its B-side by the Duke Ellington/Juan Tizol/Irving Mills song "Caravan". Al Casey actually plays lead guitar on both sides of this release, but the record was credited to "Duane Eddy and the Rock-A-Billies". The original recording of "Ramrod" was overdubbed on July 28, 1958 with Plas Johnson's saxophone and "rebel yells" were also added by the Sharps (later called The Rivingtons) for the song's second release on Jamie Records (Jamie 1109) in August 1958, now with the song "The Walker" on its B-side (written by Lee Hazlewood and Duane Eddy) and this release reached #17 on the R&B chart, #27 on the Billboard Hot 100, and #7 in Canada in 1958. The song later also appeared on Duane Eddy's 1958 album, Have 'Twangy' Guitar Will Travel.

"Ramrod" was recorded at Audio Recorders recording studio in Phoenix, Arizona, and produced by Lee Hazlewood and Lester Sill.

== Other versions ==
- The Challengers released a version on their 1963 album, Surfbeat.

The Beatles, then called The Silver Beetles recorded a cover of Ramrod from Paul McCartney's bathroom in July 1960. The version was never officially released and it circulated on bootlegs.
