= Jessica James =

Jessica James may refer to:

- Jessie James (born 1988), American country pop singer and songwriter
- Jessica James, one of the victims of the 1997 Heath High School shooting
- Jessica James and the Outlaws, 1960s American girl vocal trio
- Jessica James (author), American fiction writer
- Jessica James, main character of the film The Incredible Jessica James
- Jessica James (1929-1990), American actress of the play Gemini
- Jessica Jaymes (1979–2019), American actress and porn star

== See also ==
- Jesse James (disambiguation)
