= Justice for All! =

Studio album by Jimmy Justice
- Released: 1963
- Genre: Pop
- Label: Kapp

Justice for All! is an LP recorded by British singer Jimmy Justice. It contains all three of his British hits, "When My Little Girl Is Smiling," "Spanish Harlem," and "Ain't That Funny." Cover versions include "If You Love Me (Really Love Me)," "I'm Beginning to See the Light," and "Misty."

== Track listing ==
=== Side 1 ===
1. When My Little Girl Is Smiling - (Carole King, Gerry Goffin) - 2:27
2. If You Love Me - (Marguerite Monnot, Geoffrey Parsons) - 3:16
3. Spanish Harlem - (Jerry Leiber, Phil Spector) - 2:48
4. I'm Beginning to See the Light - (Don George, Johnny Hodges, Harry James, Duke Ellington) - 1:51
5. Once in a Lifetime (from Stop the World - I Want to Get Off) - (Leslie Bricusse, Anthony Newley) - 2:31
6. Dawning - (Mark Barkan, Tony Powers) - 2:16

=== Side 2 ===
1. Softly as in a Morning Sunrise - (Oscar Hammerstein II, Sigmund Romberg) - 2:35
2. Ain't That Funny - (Les Van Dyke) - 2:06
3. Like Young - (Paul Francis Webster, André Previn) - 3:28
4. "Misty" - (Erroll Garner, Johnny Burke) - 2:53
5. Early in the Morning - (Woody Harris, Bobby Darin) - 1:33
6. Parade of Broken Hearts - (Luther Dixon, Bob Elgin, Alan Lorber) - 1:57
