= Chee-Chee and Peppy =

Chee-Chee and Peppy were an American R&B teen vocal duo who recorded in the early 1970s and had a US Hot 100 hit with "I Know I'm In Love".

The duo comprised Dorothy "Dottie" Moore (born 1959 in Norristown, Pennsylvania) and Keith Bolling (born 1957 in Frankford, Pennsylvania). Moore, then aged 12, was discovered by record producer and songwriter Jesse James when he was asked to speak to local children at her school. She sang and danced at the event, and James later got agreement from her mother to form a duo around her. Keith Bolling was the son of Sam Cooke and a member of Frankford High School's Ambassadors of Song, and under James' direction a duo was formed. "Chee-Chee" (Moore) and "Peppy" (Bolling) took their performing names from those of their pet dogs.

Chee-Chee and Peppy's first single, "I Know I'm In Love", written, arranged and produced by James and released by Buddah Records, reached #12 on the Billboard R&B chart and #49 on the pop chart in spring 1971, and was followed by "Never Never Never", which reached #46 on the R&B chart. The duo's later recordings were less successful, but they issued an LP, Chee Chee & Peppy, in 1972. They also appeared on TV shows including American Bandstand, and toured with Linda Jones, opening for Ray Charles, James Brown, Gladys Knight and others.

The original pair disbanded in the early 1970s, but in 1981 James produced a second album by Chee Chee and Peppy, Super You, which again featured Moore as Chee-Chee but a different singer, Charles Gamble, as Peppy. Dottie Moore-Thomas later became a member of the Word of Deliverance Mass Choir led by Bishop Bobby Hilton in Forest Park, Ohio.
