= Because They're Young (song) =

Single by Duane Eddy

from the album $1,000,000 Worth of Twang
- B-side: "Rebel Walk"
- Released: April 1960
- Genre: Instrumental rock, rock and roll
- Length: 1:59
- Label: Jamie Records 1156
- Songwriters: Aaron Schroeder, Don Costa, Wally Gold
- Producers: Lee Hazlewood, Lester Sill

Duane Eddy singles chronology
"Shazam!" (1960)	"Because They're Young" (1960)	"Kommotion" (1960)

"Because They're Young" is an instrumental performed by Duane Eddy. It appeared on his 1960 album, $1,000,000 Worth of Twang.

== Background ==
"Because They're Young" was written by Aaron Schroeder, Don Costa, and Wally Gold, and produced by Lee Hazlewood and Lester Sill. It ranked #37 on Billboard magazine's Top Hot 100 songs of 1960.

== Chart performance ==
Chart (1960)	Peak position
Canada (CHUM Chart)	5
New Zealand (Lever Hit Parade)	3
UK Singles (The Official Charts Company)	2
US Billboard Hot 100	4
US Hot R&B Sides (Billboard)	17

== Other versions ==
- James Darren released a vocal version as a single in 1960. It went to #29 in the UK and #4 in New Zealand.
- Helen Shapiro put out her rendition on 10 March 1962.

== Popular culture ==
- The song was featured in the 1960 movie, Because They're Young sung by James Darren and arranged by Ernie Freeman.
- In the 1960s, various rock radio channels used Because They're Young as their theme music.
- Since 1984, Because They're Young is the official theme music of the Flemish musical nostalgia radio show De Pré Historie. The same theme was also used for the TV adaptation.
