= Have 'Twangy' Guitar Will Travel =

Studio album by Duane Eddy
- Released: January 9, 1958
- Recorded: 1957
- Studio: Audio Recorders, Phoenix, Arizona
- Genre: Instrumental rock; rock and roll; rockabilly; blues; surf; country
- Length: 33:47
- Label: Jamie
- Producer: Lee Hazlewood, Lester Sill

Duane Eddy chronology
Have 'Twangy' Guitar Will Travel (1958)	Especially for You (1959)

Singles from Have 'Twangy' Guitar Will Travel
- 1. "Moovin' N' Groovin" Released: 1958; 2. "Rebel-'Rouser" Released: May 1958; 3. "Ramrod" Released: August 1958; 4. "Cannonball" Released: October 1958; 5. "The Lonely One" Released: 1959

Professional ratings
Review scores
Source	Rating
AllMusic	4/5 stars
The Encyclopedia of Popular Music	3/5 stars
The Rolling Stone Album Guide	2/5 stars

Have 'Twangy' Guitar Will Travel is the debut album by the guitarist Duane Eddy. It was released in 1958 on Jamie Records, as JLP-3000. There were five charting singles and a B-side of an additional charting single taken from this album.

Jamie Records released the album again in 1999 on compact disc, as Jamie 4007-2, with three bonus tracks. The bonus tracks are, in order, "Up and Down", "The Walker" and "Mason Dixon Lion".

== Background ==
After releasing a couple of successful singles, Eddy released his first album, Have 'Twangy' Guitar Will Travel on January 9, 1958. It is a mix of early rock & roll, swing, country and blues, and contains several covers as well as original compositions. He and the band known as The Rebels — Al Casey on rhythm guitar, his wife Corki Casey also on rhythm guitar, Steve Douglas on saxophone, Buddy Wheeler on bass guitar, Mike Bermani and Bob Taylor on drums — who along with several guest musicians were joined by The Sharps (later known as The Rivingtons), who contributed non-lyrical vocals, whoops and hollers. The album spent 82 weeks on the Billboard charts during 1959-1960, reaching a high of #5. Five singles released both before and after the album was released, charted in the Billboard Hot 100. Eddy would go on to release nine more charting albums and 26 more charting singles in the next five years.

== Critical reception ==
MusicHound Rock: The Essential Album Guide called the album "one of the keystones of modern rock guitar."

== Track listing ==
All songs written by Duane Eddy and Lee Hazlewood unless noted.

1. "Lonesome Road" (Gene Austin, Nathaniel Shilkret) — 3:09
2. "I Almost Lost My Mind" (Ivory Joe Hunter) — 2:18
3. "Rebel Rouser" — 2:23
4. "Three-30-Blues" - 3:33
5. "Cannonball" — 1:55
6. "The Lonely One" — 1:42
7. "Detour" (Paul Westmoreland) — 2:12
8. "Stalkin'" — 2:27
9. "Ramrod" (Al Casey) — 1:42
10. "Anytime" (Herbert "Happy" Lawson) — 2:19
11. "Moovin' 'N' Groovin'" — 2:05
12. "Loving You" (Jerry Leiber, Mike Stoller) — 2:10

== Personnel ==
=== The Rebels ===
- Duane Eddy – guitar
- Al Casey – electric bass, piano, rhythm guitar
- Steve Douglas – saxophone
- Corki Casey O'Dell – rhythm guitar
- Buddy Wheeler – electric bass
- Bob Taylor – drums
- Mike Bermani – drums

=== Guest musicians ===
- Plas Johnson – saxophone
- Gil Bernal – saxophone
- Ike Clanton – bass guitar
- Jimmy Simmons – upright bass
- Jimmy Wilcox – bass guitar
- Donnie Owens – rhythm guitar
- The Sharps – backing vocals

=== Technical ===
- Lee Hazlewood – producer
- Lester Sill – producer
- Jack Miller – engineer
- Eddie Brackett – engineer
- Greg Vaughn – mastering
- Tom Moulton – mastering
- Ben Demotto – liner notes

== Chart positions ==
Year	Title	U.S. Billboard 200	UK Albums Chart	Label and catalogue
1958	Have 'Twangy' Guitar Will Travel	5	6	Jamie JLPS-3000

=== Singles ===
Year	Titles Both sides from that album except where indicated	Chart positions		
Year	Titles Both sides from that album except where indicated	Billboard	Cashbox	UK
1958	"Moovin' N' Groovin' " b/w "Up and Down" (From $1,000,000 Worth of Twang, Volume II)	72	54	-
1958	"Rebel Rouser" b/w "Stalkin'"	6	7	19
1958	"Ramrod" b/w "The Walker" (Non-LP track)	27	33	-
1958	"Cannonball" b/w "Mason Dixon Lion" (Non-LP track)	15	16	22
1959	"The Lonely One" b/w "Detour"	23	19	-
