= Cannonball (Duane Eddy song) =

Single by Duane Eddy

from the album Have 'Twangy' Guitar Will Travel
- B-side: "Mason Dixon Lion"
- Released: October 1958
- Genre: Rockabilly
- Length: 1:52
- Label: Jamie
- Songwriter(s): Duane Eddy, Lee Hazlewood
- Producer(s): Lee Hazlewood, Lester Sill

Duane Eddy singles chronology
"Ramrod" (1958)	"Cannonball" (1958)	"The Lonely One" (1959)

"Cannonball" is a song written by Duane Eddy and Lee Hazlewood and performed by Eddy. It reached #15 on the Billboard Hot 100, #22 on the R&B chart, #2 on the UK Singles Chart, #7 in Canada in 1958, and appeared on his 1958 album, Have 'Twangy' Guitar Will Travel.

The song was recorded at Audio Recorders recording studio in Phoenix, Arizona, produced by Lee Hazlewood and Lester Sill.

== Other versions ==
- Ace Cannon, on his debut 1962 album, "Tuff" Sax.
