= Jesse James (songwriter) =

American songwriter

Jesse James is an American independent record producer and songwriter, based in Philadelphia. He is best known for writing "Boogaloo Down Broadway", a 1967 top ten hit for the Fantastic Johnny C, and "The Horse" by Cliff Nobles, the instrumental version of "Love Is All Right". The session musicians who formed his James Boys included several of the musicians who later formed MFSB. In the early 1970s, James also wrote and produced hit records by the teen vocal duo Chee-Chee and Peppy.

He is sometimes confused with the soul singer Jesse James (born James Herbert McClelland, 1943), who had several US R&B hits between the 1960s and 1980s.

== Songs ==
- "Switch It On" - Cliff Nobles & Co.
