= Play Me Like You Play Your Guitar =

Single by Duane Eddy
- B-side: "Blue Montana Sky"
- Released: February 21, 1975
- Genre: Rockabilly
- Length: 3:14
- Label: GTO Records
- Songwriter(s): Keith Potger, Tony Macaulay
- Producer(s): Tony Macaulay

Duane Eddy singles chronology
"Boss Guitar" (1963)	"Play Me Like You Play Your Guitar" (1975)

"Play Me Like You Play Your Guitar" is a song written by Keith Potger and Tony Macaulay and performed by Duane Eddy, with vocals by the Rebelettes. The song reached #9 on the UK Singles Chart in 1975 and number 70 in Australia.

The song was produced by Tony Macaulay.
