= Road Trip =

A road trip is a journey on roads.

Road Trip, Road trip, or Roadtrip may also refer to:

== Film ==
- Road Trip (2000 film), a comedy film
  - Road Trip (soundtrack)
- A Mother's Rage, a 2013 American television film also known as Road Trip
- Road Trip (2024 film), a Philippine comedy road film

== Games ==
- Road Trip Adventure, a PlayStation 2 game
- ModNation Racers: Road Trip (2012), a kart racing game developed for the PlayStation Vita

== Music ==
=== Albums ===
- Road Trip (Duane Eddy album), 2011
- Road Trip (Girl Authority album), 2007
- Road Trips, a series of live concert CDs by the Grateful Dead

=== Songs ===
- "Road Trip" (song), by De Vet Du, 2017
- "Road Trips", by Drake, 2026
- "Road Trip", by The Fireman from Electric Arguments, 2008
- "Road Trip", by Ninja Sex Party from Attitude City, 2015
- "Roadtrip", by Steriogram from Schmack!, 2004
- "Roadtrip", by Dream, 2021
- "Road Trip", by The D.E.s, 2008

== Television ==
- Road Trip (TV series), a 2017 Philippine TV show on GMA
- The Road Trip (TV series), a 2024 British TV series on Paramount+

=== Episodes ===
- "The Road Trip" (Brooklyn Nine-Nine)
- "Roadtrip" (Dawson's Creek)
- "Road Trip" (Father of the Pride)
- "Road Trip" (Parks and Recreation)
- "Road Trip" (Ray Donovan)
- "Road Trip" (Teen Titans Go!)
- "Road Trip", an episode of season 3 of Phineas and Ferb

== See also ==
- The Great American Road Trip, a 2009 reality show
- Road movies, film genre
