= Jimmy Justice (musician) =

British pop singer (1939–2022)

Background information
- Born: James Anthony Bernard Little; 15 December 1939; Bermondsey, London, England
- Died: 15 November 2022 (aged 82)
- Genres: Pop
- Occupation: Singer
- Years active: 1960–1972
- Labels: Pye, Decca, RCA Victor, B&C

James Anthony Bernard Justice (né Little; 15 December 1939 – 15 November 2022) was an English pop singer who scored three Top 40 hit records in the United Kingdom in 1962.

== Biography ==
James Anthony Bernard Little was born in Bermondsey, South London, England on 15 December 1939. As a young man, Little befriended Dave and George Sweetnam, who were stepbrothers of Emile Ford. Because of this, Little was occasionally invited to sing with the Checkmates, and was encouraged by Ford to start his own group. After competing in a talent show in 1959 he was noticed by executives from EMI, but he eventually signed with Pye Records instead at the urging of Ford. His debut single, credited to Jimmy Justice and the Jury, was 1960's "I Understand Just How You Feel". While "the Jury" was the name used for Justice's subsequent backing band, on this first recording he is backed by the Checkmates.

Despite "I Understand"'s lack of success, Pye offered Jimmy a three-year recording contract. While visiting his girlfriend, who lived in Sweden, he sang in clubs and on radio and television, resulting in his first major exposure; eventually, he would score a major hit in Sweden with the tune "Little Lonely One", originally by the Jarmels. He remained in Sweden during the time that his records began to break in the UK, with three of them hitting the UK Singles Chart in 1962; "When My Little Girl Is Smiling" (No. 9, March), "Ain't That Funny" (No. 8, June), and "Spanish Harlem" (No. 20, August). His version of "When My Little Girl Is Smiling" had competition from both the Drifters original cut (UK No. 31) and Craig Douglas' cover (UK No. 9).

Because of his general absence in the UK at the time his records hit the record chart, he was unable to capitalise fully on his popularity in his home country. Nevertheless, he undertook a Larry Parnes managed UK tour, headlined by Joe Brown and Billy Fury. Meanwhile, Kapp Records picked up "When My Little Girl Is Smiling" for distribution in the U.S., where it peaked at No. 127. His records were also popular throughout continental Europe and in Australia.

Justice released two albums in 1963 (I Wake Up Crying and Justice for All!) but soon faded in the wake of the beat group explosion. The former included a cover of Clyde McPhatter's hit "Since You've Been Gone". According to Allmusic, he was a "white singer who possessed a mature, soulful voice, [and] was sometimes called 'Britain’s Ben E. King". He recorded for the Decca, RCA Victor and B&C labels into the early 1970s, but with little success. After retiring from his music career, he worked for a computer software company.

In 2001, fifty of his Pye recordings were released on two CDs by Castle Music.

== Personal life and death ==
Justice lived in Purley with his wife Sally, who died in 2017. They had two children. He was a keen Hash House Harrier. He died on 15 November 2022, at the age of 82.

== UK singles chart hits ==
- "When My Little Girl Is Smiling" (1962) (Gerry Goffin/Carole King) – No. 9 – Pye
- "Ain't That Funny" (Les Vandyke) No. 8 – Pye
- "Spanish Harlem" (Jerry Leiber/Phil Spector) No. 20 – Pye
