= Johnny Western =

American singer-songwriter

- Born: October 28, 1934 (age 91); Two Harbors, Minnesota, U.S.
- Occupations: Singer-songwriter, actor, radio show host

Johnny Western (born October 28, 1934) is an American country singer-songwriter, musician, actor, and radio show host. He is a member of the Western Music Association Hall of Fame and the Country Music Disc Jockey Hall of Fame.

== Early life ==
Johnny Western was born Johnny Westerlund in Two Harbors in Lake County in northeastern Minnesota, but was primarily reared in Northfield in south central Minnesota.

His father was an instructor and officer in several Civilian Conservation Corps camps, where Western spent some his early years. He also lived on Indian reservations along the Canada–United States border.

When he was five years old, Western's parents took him to see the western film Guns and Guitars, which starred the actor/singer Gene Autry. The young boy decided he wanted to be a singing cowboy. At the age of twelve, he received a guitar. Within a year, he was performing professionally.

== Musical career ==
Johnny Western's professional career began as a young teenager, singing and playing rhythm guitar with a collegiate singing trio. He got a job on radio at the age of thirteen, a feat publicized in Billboard as the youngest disc jockey and singer on American radio. At age sixteen, Western began performing with the Sons of the Pioneers.

He made his first professional recordings in the summer of 1952 in the studio of WCAL Radio station of St. Olaf College of Northfield, Minnesota. The six songs which resulted from those sessions were released on three singles on the local J-O-C-O label. After having played a supporting role in an episode of "Have Gun, Will Travel", Western wrote "The Ballad of Paladin" as a musical "thank-you-card" to Richard Boone. This landed a deal for him with Columbia Records.

Between August 1958 and May 1963, Western recorded seven singles and one album (Have Gun, Will Travel, released in May 1962) for Columbia, until he was dropped from their roster. He then signed a contract with the Philips label, but only one single resulted ("Light The Fuse" b/w "Tender Years").

Have Gun Will Travel included the haunting Stan Jones song "Cowpoke", which members of the Western Writers of America chose as one of the Top 100 Western songs of all time. The album was a mature work, redolent of Western lore. It also included Western's third version of "The Ballad of Paladin", a fine and introspective performance of "The Lonely Man", the gallows ballad "Hannah Lee", "The Streets of Laredo", "The Searchers" and "The Last Roundup".

After this, Western was left without a recording contract. Over the years, he recorded various songs for small local labels such as Hep in Missouri or a promo-single for Dodge City. It was not until Johnny Cash invited him to record at his House Of Cash recording studio that Western was able to compile enough material for another LP, which was released under the simple title of Johnny Western in 1981. Apart from the House of Cash recordings, it contained some unreleased songs Western had recorded for the Hep label.

Western's third album was recorded September 17–20, 1984 at Jack Clement Studio in Nashville, with Art Sparer producing. It was released under the title Johnny Western Sings 20 Great Classics & Legends. Amongst others, it contained a new version of Western's own composition "The Gunfighter", featuring Harold Bradley on gut-string guitar, imitating the original "El Paso" sound, since Western had originally written that song with Marty Robbins in mind.

He performed with Gene Autry and was a part of the Johnny Cash road show from 1958 until 1997. He wrote and performed the theme song "The Ballad of Paladin" for the CBS television program Have Gun – Will Travel, with Richard Boone. In collaboration with Johnny Cash, he re-wrote the lyrics of NBC's Bonanza and the theme song, "The Rebel – Johnny Yuma", from the ABC series The Rebel, starring Nick Adams.

In October 2013, Johnny Western announced that he would stop touring and giving concerts.

=== Albums ===
Year	Album	Label
1962	Have Gun – Will Travel	Columbia
1981	Johnny Western	JRC Records
1981	The Gunfighter	Bear Family
1984	Sings 20 Great Classics & Legends	Americana Records
1989	Gunfight at O.K. Corral [re-issue of his 1984 album]	Bear Family
1993	Heroes and Cowboys [3-CD career retrospective]	Bear Family
2008	Country and Johnny Western [contains material from his Columbia & House of Cash catalog]	Black Knight

=== Guest appearances ===
Year	Song	Artist	Album
1997	Tumbling Tumbleweeds	The Home Rangers	Bad Boots
1998	The Ballad of Palindrome	Riders in the Sky	A Great Big Western Howdy!
2007	Pancho and Lefty	Rex Allen, Jr.	The New West

== Acting career ==
Western has appeared in several television programs, including the westerns, Have Gun - Will Travel, Tales of Wells Fargo, Pony Express (in the 1960 episode "The Story of Julesburg"), and Boots and Saddles. He has had roles in several movies including The Night Rider, Fort Bowie, and The Dalton Girls.

== Radio career ==
In February 1986, Western returned to radio with a daily country music show on KFDI (1070 AM, later KFTI) a country music station calling itself "The Radio Ranch" in Wichita, Kansas. The station and sister station KFDI-FM were sold to Journal Broadcast Group in July 1999. In early April 2010, Johnny announced that he would retire from broadcasting. His last day on the air was Saturday, April 10, 2010. Just over a month and a half later the station would switch to an oldies format.

== The Johnny Western Theatre ==
The Johnny Western Theatre in Wild West World, a theme park located in Park City, Kansas near Wichita, had concerts scheduled to begin in October 2007. However, the park declared bankruptcy in July 2007. Western was never able to perform in his namesake theater, which now sits among the ruins of the Wild West World amusement park, just outside Wichita, Kansas.

== Awards and honors ==
- TV Theme Hall of Fame (1993)
- Country Music Disc Jockey Hall of Fame (2000)
- Old Time Country Music Hall of Fame (2000)
- Western Music Association Hall of Fame (2001)
- Wichita Professional Broadcasters Hall of Fame (2002)
- Kansas Cowboy Hall of Fame (2004)
- Kansas Western Swing Hall of Fame (2004)
- Michigan Country Music Hall of Fame (2013)
