= Come Closer (Chris Andrews song) =

Single by Eddie Rambeau
- B-side: "She's Smiling At Me"
- Recorded: 1964
- Genre: Rock,
- Label: 20th Century Fox
- Songwriter: Chris Andrews

"Come Closer" is a 1964 song written by Chris Andrews recorded by three well known artists of the period.

The song was first recorded by Eddie Rambeau and released in April 1964 on 20th Century Fox Records, The Rambeau version had back up vocals by the Four-Evers.

A second version was Craig Douglas and The Tridents on Ritz Records in June 1964 - also with "She's Smiling At Me" as the B-side. A third version was recorded by Adam Faith & The Roulettes on the Parlophone EP A Message to Martha on 5 February 1965. Faith's version was released again on Complete Faith.
