= The Fantastic Johnny C =

- Also known as: Johnny C
- Born: Johnny Corley; April 28, 1943 (age 83); Greenwood, South Carolina, United States
- Genres: Soul
- Occupation: Singer
- Years active: c.1965–1971
- Labels: Phil-L.A. of Soul, Kama Sutra

Johnny Corley (born April 28, 1943), better known as The Fantastic Johnny C, is an American soul singer who had four US Hot 100 hits, including the 1967 top ten hit "Boogaloo Down Broadway".

== Early life ==
Born in Greenwood, South Carolina, United States, he studied at Brewer High School but left to join the armed services before graduating. He moved to Norristown, Pennsylvania after his military duties ended, and began work as a heavy equipment operator. He joined a local gospel vocal group associated with the Macedonia Baptist Church, and while rehearsing was heard by a fellow churchgoer and nearby neighbor, the record producer and songwriter Jesse James. James persuaded Corley to start singing secular music and became his manager.

== Music career ==
Corley began performing in Philadelphia, on bills with Sam Cooke and Joe Simon among others, and James wrote the song "Boogaloo Down Broadway" for him. Arranged by Leon Mitchell and recorded in Philadelphia, the song used some of the musicians who would later form the band MFSB, including drummer Earl Young. Corley's recording was described by friends as "fantastic", prompting James to release the record on local entrepreneur Larry Cohen's label, Phil-L.A. of Soul, credited as The Fantastic Johnny C. The record rose to number 5 on the Billboard R&B chart and number 7 on the Billboard Hot 100 on December 23, 1967. Johnny C followed up the record's success with three further US chart hits in 1968 – "Got What You Need" (number 32 R&B, number 56 pop); "Hitch It to the Horse" (number 25 R&B, number 34 pop), which drew on the success of James' other writing and production success, "The Horse" by Cliff Nobles; and "(She's) Some Kind of Wonderful" (number 87 pop), a song previously recorded by Soul Brothers Six and later by Grand Funk Railroad.

The Fantastic Johnny C released one album, Boogaloo Down Broadway, which was described by an AllMusic reviewer as "a mini-masterpiece of gritty soul" and contained a number of popular dance tunes. He remained on the Phil-L.A. of Soul label until 1970 before joining Kama Sutra Records. Continuing to work with Jesse James and the same studio musicians, he released two further singles, credited simply as Johnny C, but failed to find further commercial success. He then left the music business, only undertaking occasional performances in later years. Johnnie went on to open his own record store, J.C. Records in Norristown, PA. He was married to Mattie (Baldwin) Corley and they shared three children together.
