= Jessica James (author) =

American author

- Education: Shippensburg University of Pennsylvania
- Occupation: Author
- Writing career
- Genres: Romance, suspense, historical fiction, military fiction
- Website: jessicajamesbooks.com

Jessica James is an American author of suspense, historical fiction, and military fiction ranging from the Revolutionary War to modern day.

She is a three-time winner of the John Esten Cooke Award for Southern Fiction.

James is a member of the Military Writers Society of America. the Independent Book Publishers Association

== Books ==
- James, Jessica (2008). Shades of Gray: A Novel of the Civil War in Virginia. Gettysburg, PA: Patriot Press. pp. 468 pages. ISBN 978-0979600005.
- James, Jessica (2013). Noble Cause: A Novel of Love and War. Gettysburg, PA: Patriot Press. pp. 392 pages. ISBN 978-0979600098.
- James, Jessica (2013). Above and Beyond: A Novel of the Civil War. Gettysburg, PA: Patriot Press. pp. 208 pages. ISBN 978-0979600098.
- James, Jessica (2014). Liberty and Destiny: A Novella of the American Revolution. Amazon Digital Services. pp. 113 pages.
- James, Jessica (2015). Meant To Be: A Novel of Honor and Duty. Gettysburg, PA: Patriot Press. pp. 320 pages. ISBN 978-1941020029.
- James, Jessica (2016). Deadline: Phantom Force Tactical. Gettysburg, PA: Patriot Press. pp. 320 pages. ISBN 978-1941020098.
- James, Jessica (2016). Fine Line. Gettysburg, PA: Patriot Press. pp. 274 pages. ISBN 978-1941020111.
- James, Jessica (2017). Front Line. Gettysburg, PA: Patriot Press. pp. 340 pages. ISBN 978-1941020142.
- James, Jessica (2018). Protecting Ashley. Gettysburg, PA: Patriot Press. pp. 152 pages. ISBN 978-1941020210.
- James, Jessica (2018). The Lion of the South. Gettysburg, PA: Patriot Press. pp. 340 pages. ISBN 978-1941020166.
- James, Jessica (2019). Lacewood. Gettysburg, PA: Patriot Press. pp. 406 pages. ISBN 978-1941020227.
- James, Jessica (2026). The Monarch Alliance. Gettysburg, PA. Patriot Press. pp. 421 pages ISBN 978-1-941020-55-5
- James, Jessica (2026). The Patriot's Journey: 250 Sites To Visit For America 250. Gettysburg, PA. pp. 94 pages. ISBN 978-1-941020-54-8

== Awards ==
- John Esten Cooke Award for Southern Fiction (2011, 2014, 2019, 2020)
- Indie Excellence Award Finalist (2018)
- Silver Falchion Award Finalist in Best Suspense (2018)
- B.R.A.G. Medallion Honoree (2017)
- Gold Medal – Military Writers Society of America (2016)
- Bronze Medal (Romance/Suspense) – Readers’ Favorite International Book Awards (2016)
- Book of the Year Finalist (War & Military) – Foreword Magazine (2015)
- NJRW Golden Leaf Award (2015)
- "Best Books 2013" Finalist (Fiction/Religious) – USA Book News (2013)
- Best Regional Fiction – Next Generation Indie Awards (2011)
- Best Regional Fiction – Next Generation Indie Awards (2008)
- Silver Award (Best Regional Fiction) – Independent Publisher Book Awards (2008)
- Book of the Year Finalist (Romance) – Foreword Magazine (2008)
