= Forty Miles of Bad Road =

1959 single by Duane Eddy

Single by Duane Eddy, His 'Twangy' Guitar and the Rebels

from the album $1,000,000 Worth of Twang
- B-side: "The Quiet Three"
- Released: May 1959
- Genre: Instrumental rock
- Length: 2:10
- Label: Jamie
- Songwriters: Duane Eddy; Al Casey

"Forty Miles of Bad Road" is a rock and roll instrumental recorded by Duane Eddy. Released as a single in 1959, it also appeared on Eddy's 1960 album $1,000,000 Worth of Twang.

== Chart performance ==
The song charted at No. 9 on the Pop chart. "Forty Miles of Bad Road" also went to No. 17 on the Hot R&B Sides chart.

| Chart (1959) | Peak position |
|---|---|
| Canada (CHUM Chart)(2wks@4) | 4 |
| UK Singles (The Official Charts Company) | 11 |
| US Billboard Hot 100 | 9 |
| US Billboard Hot R&B Sides | 17 |

== Song influence ==
- The idiom is referenced in the lyrics of the R.E.M. song "Crush with Eyeliner": "She's a sad tomato/She's three miles of bad road".
- It is also referenced in Bob Dylan's 2000 Academy Award winning song "Things Have Changed": "I've been walking forty miles of bad road/If the Bible is right, the world will explode."
