= Guitar Tango =

1961 song

Single by The Shadows
- B-side: "What a Lovely Tune"
- Released: 27 July 1962
- Recorded: 23 May and 18 June 1962
- Studio: EMI Studios, London
- Genre: Instrumental surf
- Length: 2:59
- Label: Columbia
- Songwriter(s): Norman Maine; Georges Liferman
- Producer(s): Norrie Paramor

The Shadows singles chronology
| "Wonderful Land" (1962) | "Guitar Tango" (1962) | "The Boys" (1962) |

"Guitar Tango" is a song originally recorded in French in 1961 as "Guitare-Tango". It was written by Georges Liferman, Norman Maine and Jacques Plaint and there were versions recorded by Dario Moreno, Tino Rossi and Maya Casabianca. However, the song is best known for the instrumental version released the following year by British group the Shadows which peaked at number 4 on the UK Singles Chart.

== Track listings ==
7": Columbia / DB 4870

1. "Guitar Tango" – 2:59
2. "What a Lovely Tune" – 2:17

7": Columbia / C 22 243 (Germany)

1. "Guitar Tango" – 2:59
2. "Driftin'" – 2:31

7": Columbia / SCMH 5130 (Netherlands)

1. "Guitar Tango" – 2:59
2. "Nivram" – 3:19

== Personnel ==
- Hank Marvin – acoustic lead guitar
- Bruce Welch – acoustic rhythm guitar
- Brian Locking – electric bass guitar
- Brian Bennett – drums
- Norrie Paramor Orchestra – all other instrumentation

== Charts ==
| Chart (1962) | Peak position |
|---|---|
| Australia (Kent Music Report) | 6 |
| Belgium (Ultratop 50 Flanders) | 18 |
| Belgium (Ultratop 50 Wallonia) | 19 |
| France | 9 |
| Germany (GfK) | 25 |
| India (The Voice, Calcutta) | 1 |
| Ireland (Evening Herald) | 3 |
| Netherlands (Single Top 100) | 5 |
| New Zealand (Lever Hit Parade) | 5 |
| Norway (VG-lista) | 10 |
| South Africa | 5 |
| Spain (Promusicae) | 15 |
| Sweden (Kvällstoppen) | 7 |
| UK Singles (OCC) | 4 |
