= Rebel-'Rouser =

Single by Duane Eddy and His 'Twangy' Guitar

from the album Have 'Twangy' Guitar Will Travel
- B-side: "Stalkin'"
- Released: May 1958
- Recorded: March 1958
- Studio: Audio Recorders (Phoenix)
- Genre: Rockabilly; country; instrumental rock
- Length: 2:23
- Label: Jamie
- Songwriters: Duane Eddy; Lee Hazlewood
- Producers: Lester Sill; Lee Hazlewood

Duane Eddy and His 'Twangy' Guitar singles chronology
| "Moovin' n' Groovin" (1958) | "Rebel-'Rouser" (1958) | "Ramrod" (1958) |

"Rebel-'Rouser" is an instrumental song written by Duane Eddy and Lee Hazlewood and originally released on Jamie Records in 1958 by "Duane Eddy and his 'twangy' guitar" as a single (Jamie 1104) as the "B" side with the song "Stalkin'" listed as the "A" side. Both tracks were produced by Lester Sill and Lee Hazlewood. In an interview with Radio DJ "Wild" Wayne from Connecticut, Duane said that when the song was released, the record company was pushing "Stalkin'" as the "A" side despite Duane's preference for "Rebel 'Rouser". Eddy went on to say that Dick Clark was at a local dance in Philadelphia there to play records for the kids to dance to. He did not realize until he arrived at the dance that he only had a short stack of records to play. As a result to help fill in with the music, he was forced to start playing the "B" sides of the records he had with him. He had already played the "Stalkin'" side of the Duane Eddy record, so when he played the "Rebel 'Rouser", an immediate response by the teens was to keep playing it over and over again. From there, Dick started plugging the song on his American Bandstand show from which it became a national hit.

It was Eddy's third single as a solo artist, following the 1957 release of the single "Ramrod"/"Caravan" on the Ford record label (a release that was credited to "Duane Eddy and His Rock-A-Billies", although Al Casey (who wrote "Ramrod") actually played lead guitar on both tracks) and which was followed in 1958 by the release of the "Moovin' 'n' Groovin'"/"Up and Down" single on Jamie (Jamie 1101), which was also released as "Duane Eddy and his 'twangy' guitar". "Rebel-'Rouser" also appeared on Duane Eddy's debut album, Have 'Twangy' Guitar Will Travel.

The song was originally called "Rabble Rouser" by Duane Eddy when it was recorded at Clay Ramsey and his son Floyd's Audio Recorders recording studio in Phoenix, Arizona, but the song's title was later changed by Lee Hazlewood to "Rebel-'Rouser" and the song charted at number six on the Billboard Hot 100. On Billboard's R&B Best Sellers chart, "Rebel-'Rouser" went to number eight. It also made number eight in Canada.

== Personnel ==
- Duane Eddy, electric lead guitar
- Buddy Wheeler, electric "click" bass
- Jimmy Simmons, acoustic bass
- Bob Taylor, drums
- Al Casey, piano
- Donnie Owens, Corki Casey O’Dell, rhythm guitars
- Gil Bernal, saxophone
- The Sharps, background vocals, rebel yells, handclaps
- Lester Sill, Lee Hazlewood, producers
- Jack Miller, recording engineer (Audio Recorders studio, Phoenix, Arizona)
