= Road Trip (Duane Eddy album) =

Studio album by Duane Eddy
- Released: June 28, 2011
- Length: 39:59
- Label: Mad Monkey Records
- Producer: Colin Elliot, Richard Hawley

Duane Eddy chronology
Duane Eddy - The Heroes Collection (2011)	Road Trip (2011)	The Best of Duane Eddy (2011)

Road Trip is a 2011 album from American guitarist Duane Eddy; it was his twenty-third and final studio album, before his death in 2024. Mojo placed the album at number 37 on its list of "Top 50 albums of 2011."

== Track listing ==
1. "The Attack of the Duck Billed Platypus" (John Trier) – 4:07
2. "Twango" (Duane Eddy) – 2:51
3. "Curveball" (Eddy) – 3:33
4. "Road Trip" (Eddy) – 2:52
5. "Bleaklow Air" (John Trier) – 4:14
6. "Kindness Ain't Made of Sand" (Eddy, Richard Hawley) – 3:50
7. "Mexborough Ferry Boat Halt" (Eddy, Shez Sheridian) – 3:44
8. "Desert Song" (Eddy, Hawley) – 5:49
9. "Primeval" (Eddy, Hawley) – 2:33
10. "Rose of the Valley" (Eddy, Hawley) – 3:49
11. "Franklin Town" (Eddy, Sheridian) – 2:37
