= The Wild Westerners =

1962 film by Sam Katzman

- Film poster
- Directed by: Oscar Rudolph
- Written by: Gerald Drayson Adams
- Produced by: Sam Katzman
- Starring: James Philbrook; Nancy Kovack; Duane Eddy; Guy Mitchell
- Cinematography: Gordon Avil
- Edited by: Jerome Thoms
- Color process: Eastmancolor
- Production company: Four Leaf Productions
- Distributed by: Columbia Pictures
- Release date: June 1962
- Running time: 70 minutes
- Country: United States
- Language: English

The Wild Westerners is a 1962 American Western film directed by Oscar Rudolph and starring James Philbrook, Nancy Kovack, Duane Eddy and Guy Mitchell.

== Plot ==
A U.S. marshal investigates when a sheriff named Plummer is suspected of involvement in a string of robberies. It becomes personal when the marshal's wife is taken captive by the outlaws.

== Cast ==
- James Philbrook as Marshal Jim McDowell
- Nancy Kovack as Rose Sharon
- Duane Eddy as Deputy Marshal Clint Fallon
- Guy Mitchell as Deputy Johnny Silver
- Hugh Sanders as Chief Marshal Reuben Bernard
- Elizabeth MacRae as Crystal Plummer
- Marshall Reed as Sheriff Plummer
- Nestor Paiva as Governor John Bullard
- Harry Lauter as Jud Gotch
- Bob Steele as Deputy Marshal Casey Bannen
- Lisa Burkett as Yellow Moon
- Terry Frost as Ashley Cartwright
- Hans Wedemeyer as Wasna
- Don Harvey as Hanna
- Elizabeth Harrower as Martha Bernard

== Soundtrack ==
The Wild Westerners
Written by Duane Eddy and Lee Hazlewood
Performed by Duane Eddy

Eddy's song was released with the flip side being The Ballad of Paladin from Have Gun, Will Travel.

== See also ==
- List of American films of 1962
