= Duane Eddy =

American guitarist (1938–2024)

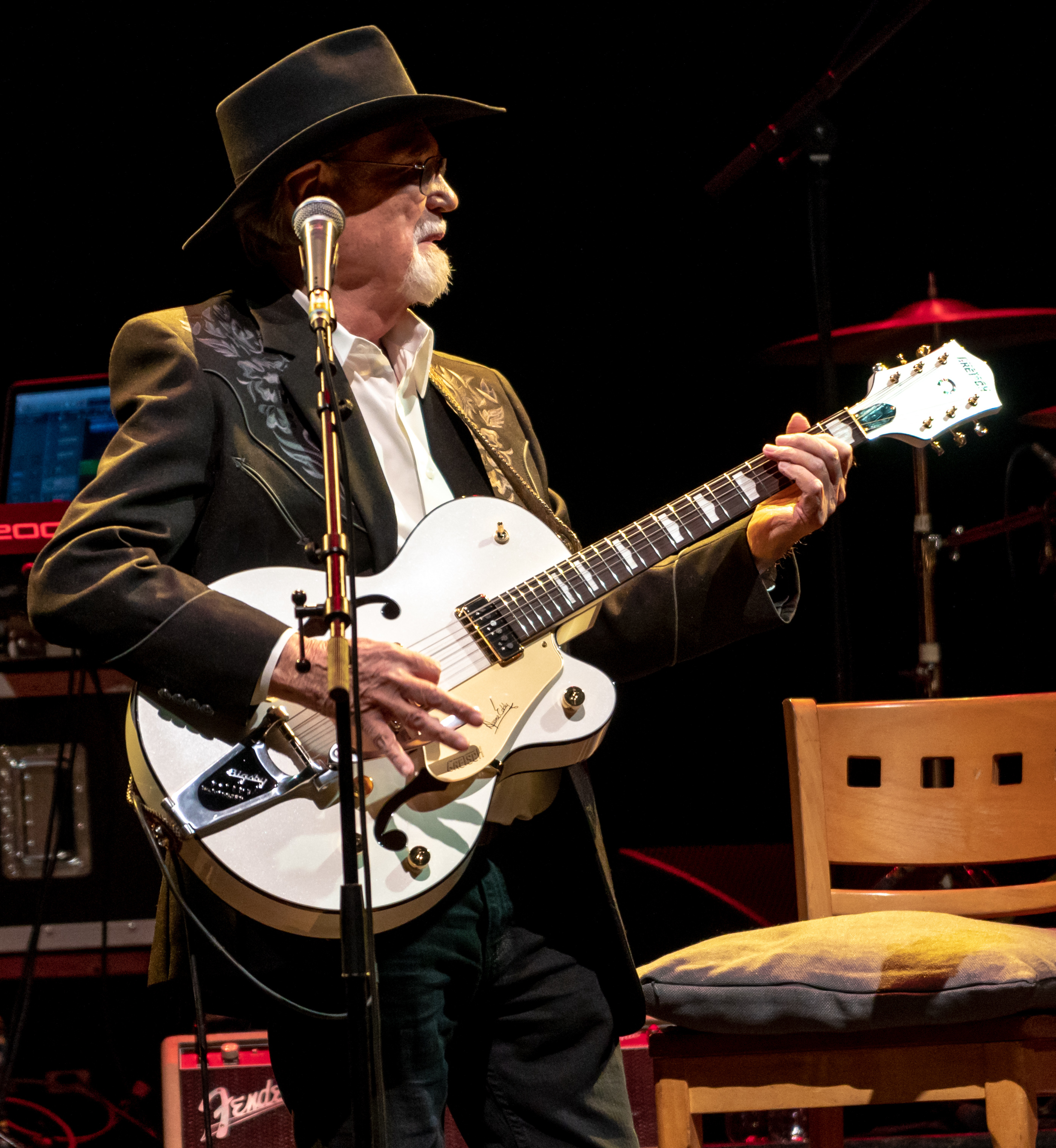
- Eddy performing in 2018

Background information
- Born: April 26, 1938; Corning, New York, U.S.
- Died: April 30, 2024 (aged 86) Franklin, Tennessee, U.S.
- Genres: Instrumental rock; rockabilly; rock and roll; country
- Occupations: Guitarist; musician
- Instruments: Guitar; bass
- Years active: 1954–2024
- Labels: Jamie; RCA Victor; Gregmark
- Spouses: Carol Puckett (divorced) Jessi Colter (m. 1961; div. 1968): Deed Abbate

Duane Eddy (April 26, 1938 – April 30, 2024) was an American guitarist. In the late 1950s and early 1960s, he had a string of hit records produced by Lee Hazlewood which were noted for their characteristically "twangy" guitar sound, including "Rebel-'Rouser", "Peter Gunn", and "Because They're Young". He had sold 12 million records by 1963. His guitar style influenced the Ventures, the Shadows, the Beatles (particularly lead guitarist George Harrison), Bruce Springsteen, Steve Earle, and Marty Stuart.

Eddy was inducted into the Rock and Roll Hall of Fame in 1994 and the Musicians Hall of Fame and Museum in 2008.

== Early life ==
Eddy was born in Corning, New York, on April 26, 1938. His parents were Lloyd and Alberta (née Granger) Eddy. Eddy's father drove a bread truck and later became the manager of a grocery store. He began playing the guitar at the age of five, after hearing the cowboy singer Gene Autry. In 1950, at the age of 12, Eddy made his first on-air radio appearance when he performed "The Missouri Waltz" on a station in Hornell, New York.

In 1951, his family moved to Tucson, Arizona, and then to Coolidge, Arizona. He formed a duo, Jimmy and Duane, with his friend Jimmy Delbridge, who later recorded as Jimmy Dell. Eddy left school at 16 and played in local bars.

== Career ==
=== 1950s–60s: Career rise and peak ===
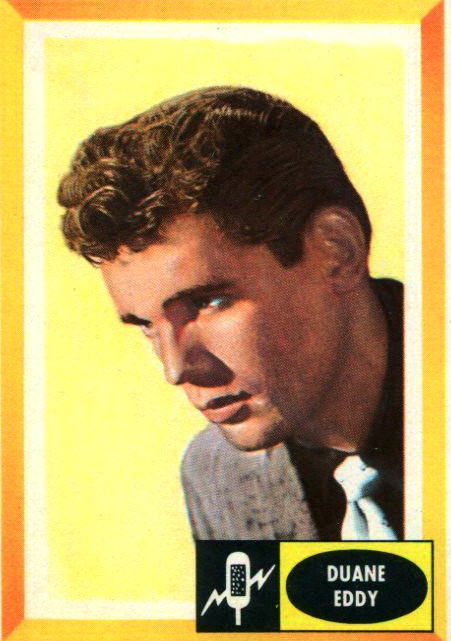
Eddy in 1960

In 1957, Eddy had a weekly showcase on radio station KCKY and then a slot on a weekly hit parade television show in Phoenix, where he met Arizona-based disc jockey, songwriter and music publisher Lee Hazlewood. Hazlewood produced the duo's single, "Soda Fountain Girl", recorded and released in 1955 in Phoenix, Arizona. They performed and appeared on radio stations in Phoenix and joined Buddy Long's Western Melody Boys, playing country music in and around the city.

Eddy was not happy with his singing voice, and he devised a technique of playing lead lines on his guitar's bass strings to produce a low, reverberant "twangy" sound instead. At the age of 19, he had acquired a 1957 Chet Atkins model Gretsch 6120 guitar from Ziggie's Music in Phoenix, and in November 1957, he recorded an instrumental piece, "Movin' n' Groovin'", which he co-wrote with Hazlewood. His backing band included saxophonist Steve Douglas, pianist Larry Knechtel, and bassist Al Casey. As the Phoenix studio had no echo chamber, Hazlewood bought a 2,000-gallon (7570-litre) water storage tank to use as an echo chamber to accentuate the "twangy" guitar sound. In 1958, Eddy signed a recording contract with Lester Sill and Hazlewood to record in Phoenix at the Audio Recorders studio. Sill and Hazlewood leased the tapes of all their singles and albums to the Philadelphia-based Jamie Records.

"Movin' n' Groovin'" reached number 72 on the Billboard Hot 100 in early 1958. The opening riff, borrowed from Chuck Berry's "Brown Eyed Handsome Man", was in turn copied a few years later by the Beach Boys on "Surfin' U.S.A." The follow-up, "Rebel-'Rouser", featured a saxophone overdubbed by Los Angeles session musician Gil Bernal, and yells and handclaps by doo-wop group the Rivingtons. This became Eddy's breakthrough hit, reaching number 6 on the Billboard Hot 100 chart. It sold over one million copies, earning him his first gold disc.

Eddy had a succession of hit records over the next few years. His band members, including saxophonists Steve Douglas and Jim Horn, and keyboard player Larry Knechtel, were later members of Phil Spector's Wrecking Crew. According to writer Richie Unterberger, "The singles, of which 'Peter Gunn', 'Cannonball', 'Shazam', and 'Forty Miles of Bad Road' were probably the best, also did their part to help keep the raunchy spirit of rock and roll alive during a time in which it was in danger of being watered down."

On January 9, 1958, Eddy's debut album, Have 'Twangy' Guitar Will Travel, was released. It reached number five and remained on the chart for 82 weeks. Duane Eddy and the Rebels appeared six times on The Dick Clark Show between 1958 and 1960. On Eddy's fourth album, Songs of Our Heritage (1960), each track featured him playing acoustic guitar or banjo. His biggest hit came with the theme of the movie Because They're Young in 1960, which featured a string arrangement. It reached a chart peak of number four in America and number two in the UK in September 1960, and became his second million-selling disc. Eddy's records were consistently more successful in the UK than they were in his native United States, and in 1960, readers of the UK's NME voted him World's Number One Musical Personality, ousting Elvis Presley.

In 1960, Eddy signed a contract directly with Jamie Records, bypassing Sill and Hazlewood, which caused a temporary rift between Eddy and Hazlewood. The result was that for the duration of his contract with Jamie, Eddy produced his own singles and albums.

In the 1960s, Eddy launched an acting career, appearing in such films as Because They're Young, A Thunder of Drums, The Wild Westerners, Kona Coast, and The Savage Seven. In 1961, he signed a three-year contract with Paul Anka's production company, Camy, whose recordings were issued by RCA Victor. In the early days of recording in the RCA Victor studios, he renewed contact with Lee Hazlewood, who became involved in a number of his RCA Victor singles and albums. Eddy's 1962 single release, "(Dance with the) Guitar Man", co-written with Hazlewood, sold a million copies and earned his third gold disc. Also in 1962, Eddy recorded "The Ballad of Paladin", the instrumental theme song to the Western television series Have Gun – Will Travel, in which Eddy also acted in two episodes. Eddy had sold 12 million records by 1963. In 1965, he released an album of instrumental versions of Bob Dylan songs.

=== 1970s–80s: Solo decline, focus on production, and comeback ===
In the 1970s, Eddy produced songs for Phil Everly and Waylon Jennings. In 1972, he worked as lead guitarist, alongside rhythm guitarist Al Gorgoni, on BJ Thomas's "Rock and Roll Lullaby". In 1975 a collaboration with hit songwriter Tony Macaulay and former founding member of The Seekers, Keith Potger, led to another UK top 10 record, "Play Me Like You Play Your Guitar", featuring a female vocal group. Eddy performed on the BBC television show "Top of the Pops" while promoting the single. A recording of "You Are My Sunshine", featuring Willie Nelson, Waylon Jennings, and Eddy's third wife Deed, appeared in the country charts in 1977.

In 1982, Eddy's "Rebel Walk" was heard in the musical comedy Grease 2 as background music at the bowling alley. It was not part of the original soundtrack, but was mentioned in the film's credits.

In 1986, Eddy collaborated with Art of Noise on a new recording of his 1960 version of Henry Mancini's "Peter Gunn". It was a top 10 hit around the world, ranking number one on Rolling Stone's dance chart for six weeks that summer. "Peter Gunn" won the Grammy for Best Rock Instrumental of 1986. It also gave Eddy the distinction of being the only instrumentalist to have had top 10 hit singles in four different decades in the UK.

The following year, the album Duane Eddy was released on Capitol. Several of the tracks were produced by Paul McCartney, Jeff Lynne, Ry Cooder and Art of Noise. Guest musicians included John Fogerty, George Harrison, Paul McCartney, Ry Cooder, James Burton, David Lindley, Phil Pickett, Steve Cropper, and original Rebels Larry Knechtel and Jim Horn. The album included a cover of Paul McCartney's 1979 instrumental, "Rockestra Theme".

=== 1990s–2024: Later career ===
In 1992, Eddy recorded a duet with Hank Marvin for Marvin's album Into the Light, a cover version of The Chantays' 1963 hit "Pipeline". Eddy's "Rebel-'Rouser" was featured in 1994 in the film Forrest Gump. Oliver Stone's Natural Born Killers used "The Trembler", a track written by Eddy and Ravi Shankar. Also in 1994, Eddy teamed up with Carl Perkins and The Mavericks to contribute "Matchbox" to the AIDS benefit album Red Hot + Country, produced by the Red Hot Organization. Eddy was the lead guitarist on Foreigner's 1995 hit "Until the End of Time", which reached the top 10 on the Billboard Adult Contemporary chart. In 1996, Eddy played guitar on Hans Zimmer's soundtrack for the film Broken Arrow.

In October 2010, Eddy returned to the UK for a sold-out Royal Festival Hall concert in London. This success prompted an album, Road Trip, for Mad Monkey/EMI, produced by Richard Hawley in Sheffield, England. The album was released on June 20, 2011, and Mojo placed it at number 37 on its list of "Top 50 albums of 2011." Eddy performed at the Glastonbury Festival on June 26, 2011.

In 2015, Eddy participated in overdubbing sessions for the Elvis Presley and Royal Philharmonic Orchestra (RPO) remix album If I Can Dream, adding guitar to "Bridge Over Troubled Water" and "An American Trilogy". Eddy later expressed disappointment that some of his guitar playing was cut from the two songs, which he assumed happened because it may have interfered with the orchestral focus of the album project.

In 2016, Eddy participated in an extensive interview with the Country Music Hall of Fame and Museum as part of their "Nashville Cats" series.

For an 80th-birthday tour in 2018, Eddy returned to the UK in concerts with Liverpudlian singer-songwriter Robert Vincent, performing on October 23 at the London Palladium, and October 30 at Bridgewater Hall in Manchester.

In 2020, Eddy participated in overdubbing sessions for the Johnny Cash and RPO remix album (titled Johnny Cash and the Royal Philharmonic Orchestra), adding guitar to the gospel song "Farther Along". In an interview with Music Radar that year, Eddy was unsure if he would continue recording or touring after conditions related to the coronavirus pandemic improved; however, he stated that he was working on a documentary and considering writing an autobiography.

In 2024, Eddy was one of 66 musicians credited for collaborating with Mark Knopfler on a re-recording of Knopfler's “Going Home (Theme From Local Hero)". Jointly credited as "Mark Knopfler's Guitar Heroes", the single was released as a charity single to benefit two charities, Teenage Cancer Trust and Teen Cancer America. It debuted and peaked at No. 1 on Billboard's Rock Digital Song Sales in March, which was his only #1 on any Billboard chart; in the UK, the collaborative single reached the top 20 on the main singles chart.

== Personal life and death ==
Eddy's first wife was Carol Puckett; they were married and divorced prior to 1961. In 1961, Eddy married singer Mirriam Johnson, with whom he recorded a gospel album. They had a daughter, Jennifer. Duane and Mirriam divorced in 1968. She adopted the stage name Jessi Colter, became a popular country singer, and later married fellow country star Waylon Jennings.

Eddy later married Deed Abbate, with whom he collaborated on a cover of "You Are My Sunshine" in 1977. Eddy had three children with her.

Eddy died of cancer in Franklin, Tennessee, on April 30, 2024, four days after his 86th birthday. Eddy was survived by his third wife Deed and his children (four, according to an obituary by Billboard, or three, according to an obituary by The Guardian). The Guardian also reported that Eddy was also survived by five grandchildren and nine great-grandchildren.

Eddy was the last surviving musician to have charted in the top 10 of the first-ever issue of the Billboard Hot 100 chart in 1958.

== Awards ==
In 1987, Eddy won his first and only Grammy award for Best Rock Instrumental Performance for his re-recording of "Peter Gunn" with Art of Noise. In 1996, he received a second Grammy nomination, this time for Best Country Instrumental Performance, for his contribution as a "featured artist" on Doc Watson's "Thunder Road/Sugarfoot Rag".

In 1994, Eddy was inducted into the Rock and Roll Hall of Fame, and he was inducted into the Musicians Hall of Fame and Museum in 2008. In 1997, Eddy was inducted into Guitar Center's "Rockwalk", an honor similar to the Hollywood Walk of Fame bestowed exclusively to legendary rock and pop musicians.

In 2000, at the Ryman Auditorium in Nashville, Tennessee, the title "Titan of Twang" was bestowed upon Eddy by mayor Bill Purcell.

In 2004, Eddy was presented with the Guitar Player Magazine "Legend Award". He was the second recipient of the award, the first having been presented to Les Paul.

== Legacy ==
Among those who have acknowledged Eddy's influence are George Harrison, Dave Davies, Hank Marvin, the Ventures, John Entwistle, Bruce Springsteen, John Fogerty, Adrian Belew, Bill Nelson, Mark Knopfler, Steve Earle, Marty Stuart, Ritchie Blackmore, and Ben Vaughn. Eddy's playing inspired some of the lead guitar playing on Springsteen's 1975 hit "Born to Run".

In the 1990s, Eddy's songs appeared in the soundtracks of popular films including Forrest Gump, Natural Born Killers, Broken Arrow, Milk Money, and Scream 2.

== Signature guitars ==
Eddy's favored guitar was a 1957 Chet Atkins Gretsch 6120 guitar that he bought at Ziggie's Music in Phoenix, Arizona in 1957. He traded in an early 1950s gold top Gibson Les Paul Standard guitar for it, plus monthly payments of $17. On 1959's The "Twangs" the "Thang" LP he also used a Danelectro six-string bass.

Eddy became the first rock and roll guitarist to have a signature guitar when, in 1961, the Guild Guitar Company introduced the Duane Eddy signature models DE-400 and the deluxe DE-500. A limited edition of the DE-500 model was reissued briefly in 1983 to mark Eddy's 25th anniversary in the recording industry. In 1997, 40 years after he bought his Gretsch Chet Atkins 6120, Gretsch started production of the Duane Eddy Signature Model, the Gretsch 6120-DE. In 2004, the Gibson Custom Art and Historic Division introduced the new Duane Eddy Signature Gibson guitar. A new Gretsch G6120DE Duane Eddy Signature model was released in spring 2011 and in 2018 Gretsch released the G6120TB-DE Duane Eddy 6-string bass model.

== Awards ==
- Number One World Musical Personality in the NME Poll (UK: 1960)
- Grammy Winner – Best Rock Instrumental – "Peter Gunn" (1986)
- Grammy Nomination – Best Country Instrumental – (Doc Watson album) (1992)
- Rock and Roll Hall of Fame Member (1994)
- Rockwalk Induction (1997)
- Presented with "Chetty" award by Chet Atkins (2000)
- Guitar Player Magazine Legend Award (2004)
- Musicians Hall of Fame Member (2008)
- Mojo Icon Award (UK: 2010)

== Discography ==
=== Studio albums ===
Year	Album	Peak chart positions				Label and stereo catalogue reference	Notes								
Year	Album	US Billboard	US Cashbox Mono	US Cashbox Stereo	UK	Label and stereo catalogue reference	Notes								
Year	Album	US Billboard	US Cashbox Mono	US Cashbox Stereo	UK	Label and stereo catalogue reference	Notes	1958	Have 'Twangy' Guitar Will Travel	5	3	—	6	Jamie JLPS-3000	Original album covers were white with Duane Eddy sitting on guitar case and the LP title in white. Second pressings showed the same cover with the LP title in green and red; third pressings were red album covers with Duane Eddy standing. Note: It is very likely that so-called "original" version white letter covers do not exist.
1959	Especially for You	24	13	—	6	Jamie JLPS-3006									
1959	The "Twangs" the "Thang"	18	14	36	2	Jamie JLPS-3009									
1960	Songs of Our Heritage	—	38	—	13	Jamie JLPS-3011	Original copies featured gatefold covers, later replaced with regular covers. Also pressed in limited quantities of red vinyl and blue vinyl.								
1961	Girls! Girls! Girls!	93	29	—	—	Jamie JLPS-3019	Front cover features photos of Duane Eddy with Brenda Lee and Annette Funicello								
1962	Twistin' with Duane Eddy	—	—	—	—	Jamie JLPS-3022									
1962	Twistin' 'N' Twangin'	82	—	—	8	RCA Victor LSP-2525									
1962	Twangy Guitar – Silky Strings	72	—	—	13	RCA Victor LSP-2576									
1963	Duane Eddy & The Rebels – In Person (a.k.a. Surfin')	—	—	—	—	Jamie JLPS-3024									
1963	(Dance with the) Guitar Man	47	30	—	14	RCA Victor LSP-2648									
1963	"Twang" a Country Song	—	63	—	—	RCA Victor LSP-2681									
1963	"Twangin'" Up a Storm!	93	82	—	—	RCA Victor LSP-2700									
1964	Lonely Guitar	144	66	—	—	RCA Victor LSP-2798	Entered the Billboard 200 on 16 May 1964								
1965	Water Skiing	—	69	29	—	RCA Victor LSP-2918									
1965	Twangin' the Golden Hits	—	82	—	—	RCA Victor LSP-2993									
1965	Twangsville	—	—	—	—	RCA Victor LSP-3432	Record sleeve copyright dated 23 July 1965								
1965	Duane-a-Go-Go	—	—	—	—	Colpix CPS-490									
1965	Duane Eddy Does Bob Dylan	—	—	—	—	Colpix CPS-494									
1966	The Biggest Twang of All	—	—		—	Reprise RS-6218									
1967	The Roaring Twangies	—	—		—	Reprise RS-6240									
1967	Tokyo Hits	—	—		—	Reprise	Japan only release								
1987	Duane Eddy & The Rebels	—	—		—	Capitol ST-12567									
2011	Road Trip	—	—		116	Mad Monkey/EMI MAD1									
"—" denotes a recording that did not chart or was not released in that territory.

=== Compilations ===
Year	Title	US Billboard	US Cashbox Mono	UK	Label and stereo catalogue reference	Notes
1960	$1,000,000 Worth of Twang	10	38	5	Jamie JLPS-3014	
1962	$1,000,000.00 Worth of Twang, Volume 2	-	-	18	Jamie JLPS-3021	
1964	16 Greatest Hits	-	-	-	Jamie JLPS-3026	
1965	The Best of Duane Eddy	-	-	-	RCA LSP-3477	
1975	Guitar Man	-	-	-	GTO GTLP 002	
1978	Pure Gold	-	-	-	RCA ANL1-2671	
1978	Twenty Terrific Twangies	-	-	-	RCA	
1986	Compact Command Performances	-	-	-	Motown WD72547	
1986	21 Greatest Hits	-	-	-	Motown	
1991	Twangy Peaks	-	-	-	EMI CDP 7965572	
1993	Twang Thang: The Duane Eddy Anthology	-	-	-	Rhino R2-71223	
1994	Twangin' from Phoenix To L.A.	-	-	-	Bear Family Records/BCD 15778 EK	
1996	Ghostrider	-	-	-	Curb D2-77801	
2013	Complete UK Hits: 1958–62	-	-	-	Peaksoft PEA016	

=== Singles ===
Year	Titles Both sides from same album except where indicated	Chart positions					Album
Year	Titles Both sides from same album except where indicated	US Billboard	US Cashbox	AUS	UK	CAN	Album
1955	"I Want Some Lovin'" b/w "Soda Fountain Girl" (Credited to "Jimmy & Duane with Buddy Long & The Western Melody Boys")	-	-	-	-	-	Non-LP tracks
1958	"Moovin' n' Groovin'" b/w "Up and Down" (From $1,000,000 Worth of Twang, Volume II)	72	54	-	-	-	Have "Twangy" Guitar Will Travel
1958	"Rebel-'Rouser" b/w "Stalkin'"	6	7	9	19	8	Have "Twangy" Guitar Will Travel
1958	"Ramrod" b/w "The Walker" (Non-LP. Eddy does not appear on the track)	27	33	90	-	7	Have "Twangy" Guitar Will Travel
1958	"Cannonball" b/w "Mason Dixon Lion" (Non-LP track)	15	16	52	22	7	Have "Twangy" Guitar Will Travel
1959	"The Lonely One" b/w "Detour"	23	19	47/45	-	8	Have "Twangy" Guitar Will Travel
1959	"Peter Gunn" b/w "Yep!"	(see 1960)			6	2	Especially for You
1959	"Yep!" b/w "Three-30-Blues" (from Have "Twangy" Guitar Will Travel)	30	27	46	17	12	Especially for You
1959	"Forty Miles of Bad Road" /	9	10	11	11	4	$1,000,000 Worth of Twang
1959	"The Quiet Three"	46	68	-	-	-	$1,000,000 Worth of Twang
1959	"Some Kind-a Earthquake" /	37	28	32	12	21	$1,000,000 Worth of Twang
1959	"First Love, First Tears"	59	75	-	-	21	$1,000,000 Worth of Twang
1960	"Bonnie Came Back" b/w "Lost Island" (Non-LP track)	26	20	15	12	15	$1,000,000 Worth of Twang
1960	"Shazam!" b/w "The Secret Seven" (Non-LP track)	45	41	21	4	26	Duane Eddy's 16 Greatest Hits
1960	"Because They're Young" b/w "Rebel Walk" (from The "Twangs" The "Thang")	4	3	6	2	5	$1,000,000 Worth of Twang
1960	"Kommotion" b/w "Theme for Moon Children"	78	39	40	13	27	$1,000,000 Worth of Twang
1960	"Peter Gunn" b/w "Along the Navajo Trail"	27	26	2	(see 1959)	30	Especially For You
1961	"Pepe" b/w "Lost Friend"	18	19	29	2	17	$1,000,000 Worth of Twang, Volume II
1961	"Theme from Dixie" /	39	37	21	7	37	$1,000,000 Worth of Twang, Volume II
1961	"Gidget Goes Hawaiian"	101	-	-	-	-	$1,000,000 Worth of Twang, Volume II
1961	"Ring of Fire" b/w "Bobbie" (from $1,000,000 Worth of Twang, Volume II)	84	57	27	17	-	Non-LP track
1961	"Drivin' Home" b/w "Tammy" (from Girls! Girls! Girls!)	87	69	43	30	-	$1,000,000 Worth of Twang, Volume II
1961	"My Blue Heaven" b/w "Along Came Linda" (from Especially for You)	50	81	62	-	-	The "Twangs" the "Thang"
1961	"Caravan" (Part 1) b/w "Caravan" (Part 2)	-	-	-	42	-	Non-LP tracks
1962	"The Avenger" b/w "Londonderry Air"	101	-	60	-	-	Non-LP tracks
1962	"Moanin' 'n' Twistin'"	18	19	-	-	-	Twistin' 'n' Twangin'
1962	"The Battle" b/w "Trambone"	114	100	-	-	-	The "Twangs" the "Thang"
1962	"Deep in the Heart of Texas" b/w "Saints and Sinners" (Non-LP track)	78	83	38	19	-	The Best of Duane Eddy
1962	"Runaway Pony" b/w "Just Because" (from Especially for You)	-	-	–	-	-	Non-LP track, Final Jamie Records single
1962	"The Ballad of Paladin" b/w "The Wild Westerners" (Non-LP track)	33	48	15	10	9	The Best of Duane Eddy
1962	"(Dance with the) Guitar Man" b/w "Stretchin' Out" (Non-LP track)	12	11	-	4	2	Dance with the Guitar Man
1963	"Boss Guitar" b/w "The Desert Rat" (Non-LP track)	28	30	13	27	5	The Best of Duane Eddy
1963	"Lonely Boy, Lonely Guitar" b/w "Joshin'" (Non-LP track)	82	76	52	35	-	The Best of Duane Eddy
1963	"Your Baby's Gone Surfin" b/w "Shuckin'" (Non-LP track)	93	82	46	49	-	The Best of Duane Eddy
1964	"The Son of Rebel Rouser" b/w "The Story of Three Loves"	97	90	-	-	-	Non-LP tracks
1964	"Guitar Child" b/w "Jerky Jalopy" (Non-LP track)	-	–	-	-	-	Twangin' Up a Storm
1964	"Water Skiing" b/w "Theme from 'A Summer Place'" (from Twangin' the Golden Hits)	-	–	-	-	-	Water Skiing
1964	"Guitar Star" b/w "The Iguana"	-	-	-	-	-	Non-LP tracks
1965	"Moon Shot" b/w "Roughneck"	-	-	-	-	-	Non-LP tracks
1965	"Trash" b/w "South Phoenix"	-	-	-	-	-	Duane a Go-Go
1965	"Don't Think Twice, It's Alright" b/w "The House of the Rising Sun"	-	-	-	-	-	Duane Eddy Does Bob Dylan
1966	"El Rancho Grande" b/w "Papa's Movin' On (I'm Movin' On)"	-	-	-	-	-	Non-LP tracks
1966	"Daydream" b/w "This Guitar Was Made for Twangin'"	-	-	-	-	-	The Biggest Twang of Them All
1967	"Roarin'" b/w "Monsoon" (Non-LP track)	-	-	-	-	-	The Roarin' Twangies
1967	"Guitar on My Mind" b/w "Wicked Woman from Wickenburg" (from The Roarin' Twangies) (Credited to "Duane and Miriam Eddy")	-	-	-	-	-	Non-LP tracks
1968	"There Is a Mountain" b/w "This Town"	-	-	-	-	-	Non-LP tracks
1968	"The Satin Hours" b/w "Niki Hoeky"	-	-	-	-	-	Non-LP tracks
1969	"Break My Mind" b/w "Lovingbird"	-	-	-	-	-	Non-LP tracks
1970	"Freight Train" b/w "Put a Little Love in Your Heart"	110	95	-	-	93 (Note: In addition to charting and peaking at No. 93 on RPM's Canadian pop charts, "Freight Train" also peaked at No. 22 on RPM's Canadian adult contemporary charts.)	Non-LP tracks
1970	"Something" b/w "The Five-Seventeen"	-	-	-	-	-	Non-LP tracks
1972	"Renegade" b/w "Nightly News"	-	-	-	-	-	Non-LP tracks
1975	"Play Me Like You Play Your Guitar" b/w "Blue Montana Sky"	-	-	-	9	-	Non-LP tracks
1975	"The Man With The Gold Guitar" b/w "Mark of Zorro"	-	-	-	-	-	Non-LP tracks
1975	"Love Confusion" b/w "Love is a Warm Emotion"	-	-	-	-	-	Non-LP tracks
1976	"You Are My Sunshine" b/w "From 8 to 7"	-	-	-	-	-	Non-LP tracks
1986	"Peter Gunn" (with Art of Noise) b/w "Something Always Happens" (The Art of Noise)	50	49	-	8	14	Non-LP tracks
1987	"Spies" b/w "Rockabilly Holiday"	-	-	-	-	-	Duane Eddy
"—" denotes a recording that did not chart or was not released in that territory.

== Film appearances ==
- Because They're Young (1960)
- A Thunder of Drums (1961)
- The Wild Westerners (1962)
- The Savage Seven (1968)
- Kona Coast (1968)
