= (Dance with the) Guitar Man =

Single by Duane Eddy

from the album Dance with the Guitar Man
- B-side: "Stretchin' Out"
- Released: September 15, 1962
- Genre: Rockabilly
- Length: 2:36
- Label: RCA Victor
- Songwriters: Duane Eddy, Lee Hazlewood
- Producer: Lee Hazlewood

Duane Eddy singles chronology
"The Ballad of Paladin" (1962)	"(Dance with the) Guitar Man" (1962)	"Boss Guitar" (1963)

"(Dance with the) Guitar Man" is a song written by Duane Eddy and Lee Hazlewood and performed by Eddy, featuring vocals by The Blossoms (as The Rebelettes). The song was produced by Lee Hazlewood. It was arranged by Anita Kerr. The song appeared on his 1963 album, Dance with the Guitar Man. It was recorded at the RCA Nashville Sound Studio in Nashville, Tennessee.

== Chart performance ==
"Dance with the Guitar Man" song reached #4 on the UK Singles Chart, #2 in Canada, #12 on the Billboard Hot 100, and #3 in Norway in 1962.

== Other Versions ==
- The Tremeloes released a version of the song in 1963.
