= The Ballad of Paladin =

Single by Duane Eddy
- B-side: "The Wild Westerners"
- Released: June 1962
- Genre: Rockabilly
- Length: 1:56
- Label: RCA Victor
- Songwriters: Johnny Western, Richard Boone, Sam Rolfe
- Producer: Lee Hazlewood

Duane Eddy singles chronology
"Runaway Pony" (1962)	"The Ballad of Paladin" (1962)	"(Dance with the) Guitar Man" (1962)

"The Ballad of Paladin" is a song written by Johnny Western, Richard Boone, and Sam Rolfe and performed by Duane Eddy. The song reached No. 10 on the UK Singles Chart and No. 33 on the Billboard Hot 100 in 1962. Members of the Western Writers of America chose it as one of the Top 100 Western songs of all time. Eddy's flip side was the theme to The Wild Westerners.

The song was produced by Lee Hazlewood and arranged by Bob Thompson. Drummer Earl Palmer played on the session. Duane Eddy was good friends with the show's star Richard Boone and appeared with him in a couple of the episodes. He also appeared with him in the 1962 motion picture The Wild Westerners.

The song was also used heavily in the film Stand by Me, and gave its name to the third episode of the third season of the American television series Euphoria.

== Charts ==
Chart (1962)	Peak position
Canada (CHUM Hit Parade)	9
Ireland (IRMA)	8
UK Singles (Official Charts)	10
US Billboard Hot 100	33
US Cash Box Top 100	48

== Other versions ==
- Johnny Western recorded the original version in 1958 that was the regular theme to the television show Have Gun – Will Travel from the second season on--it was used at least four times in season 1, including episodes 33 & 34. His co-writers were the show's star and creator. Years later, he recorded a parody, "The Ballad of Palindrome", with the western swing and comedy group Riders in the Sky.
- Al Caiola released a version as part of an EP in 1962.
- Faron Young released a version as part of an EP in 1963.
