= When My Little Girl Is Smiling =

Single by The Drifters

from the album Save the Last Dance for Me
- B-side: "Mexican Divorce"
- Released: February 1962
- Recorded: October 26, 1961
- Studio: Atlantic Studios, New York City, U.S.
- Genre: Pop
- Length: 2:31
- Label: Atlantic 45-2134
- Songwriter(s): Gerry Goffin and Carole King
- Producer(s): Jerry Leiber and Mike Stoller

The Drifters singles chronology
"Room Full of Tears" (1961)	"When My Little Girl Is Smiling" (1962)	"Stranger on the Shore" (1962)

"When My Little Girl Is Smiling" is a pop song written by Gerry Goffin and Carole King, and first recorded by The Drifters in 1961.

At the time of recording the song on October 26, 1961, the Drifters comprised Charlie Thomas (tenor), Rudy Lewis (tenor), Dock Green (baritone) and Tommy Evans (bass). On "When My Little Girl Is Smiling", Charlie Thomas sang lead. The recording took place in Atlantic Studios, 157 W 57th Street, New York City, with guitarist Billy Davis and other session musicians, arranged by Klaus Ogermann, and produced by Jerry Leiber and Mike Stoller. Released as a single by Atlantic Records in February 1962, it reached No.28 on the Billboard Hot 100.

In Britain, the Drifters' recording reached number 31 on the UK Singles Chart in May 1962. It was covered more successfully by two local artists – Craig Douglas, whose version on Top Rank Records reached number 9, and Jimmy Justice, whose recording on Pye Records reached the same position.

The song has been recorded by many other acts. In France, it was recorded by Johnny Hallyday and by Sophie, among others, as "Quand un air vous possède", with lyrics by Georges Aber.
