= The Horse =

Single by Cliff Nobles and Company
- A-side: "Love Is All Right"
- Released: 1968
- Genre: Soul
- Length: 2:34
- Label: Phil-L.A. of Soul 313 (US) Columbia C4-2812 (Canada)
- Songwriter: Jesse James
- Producer: Jesse James

Cliff Nobles and Company singles chronology
"The More I Do for You, Baby" (1968)	"The Horse" (1968)	"Judge Baby I'm Back" (1968)

Audio
- "The Horse" on YouTube

"The Horse" is an instrumental song by Cliff Nobles and Company. It was released as the B-side of the single "Love Is All Right" and is simply an instrumental version of that song.

== Background ==
Although Nobles is the title artist, he does not personally perform on the track. The song was simply "Love Is All Right" without his vocal track. The horn section which is featured eventually became the group MFSB. Mike Terry played the baritone saxophone on this recording.

The track itself features a simple, unvarying rhythmic line played by different instruments, finished off each time around by a melodic, heralding horn section line.

According to Bobby Eli, a guitarist on the session, the instrumental track was the result of his jamming in the studio with guitarist Norman Harris, bassist Ronnie Baker, and drummer Earl Young (later to become the first MFSB rhythm section and the core of the group the Trammps). The jam was then "tweaked" by arranger Bobby Martin and recording studio owner and engineer Frank Virtue. Neither Cliff Nobles (the ostensible artist) nor Jesse James (the credited songwriter and producer) was present for the session.

== Chart performance ==
It peaked at number 2 on both the US Billboard Hot 100 chart (in June 1968) and the US Billboard R&B chart. In Canada the song reached number 7.

The song sold a million copies within three months of release, and attained the gold record award from the Recording Industry Association of America in August 1968.

== Popular culture ==
- At the time, the record was popular for radio stations carrying into their hourly news segments and the like. It was also well known for being the theme music to the music promotional video series The Now Explosion, which premiered almost a decade before MTV.
- More than five decades after its release, the song continues to be a staple of American marching bands and pep bands, and is often heard at American football and basketball games.
