= Craig Douglas =

English pop singer (1941–2026)

Background information
- Born: Terence Perkins; 13 August 1941; Newport, Isle of Wight, England
- Died: 4 September 2026 (aged 85)
- Genres: Rock and roll, pop
- Occupation: Singer
- Years active: 1958–2011
- Labels: Top Rank, Columbia (EMI), Decca

Terence Perkins (13 August 1941 – 4 September 2026), known professionally as Craig Douglas, was an English rock and roll and pop singer, who was popular in the late 1950s and early 1960s. His sole UK chart-topper, "Only Sixteen" (1959), outsold Sam Cooke's original version there.

== Early life and career ==
Terence Perkins was born as a twin, in Newport, Isle of Wight, on 13 August 1941. He was employed as a milkman before becoming a professional singer, and was known to many as the "Singing Milkman". His manager was Bunny Lewis, who gave him the name Craig Douglas. Lewis saw the name outside a house in Scotland. Douglas said there were a number of Terrys around at the time and not many Craigs, and that was one of the reasons his name was changed.

Voted Best New Singer in 1959 in the British music magazine NME, Douglas went on to record eight cover versions of former American hit songs, in his total of nine Top 40 UK singles. Amongst that tally, Douglas had a number one single in 1959 with "Only Sixteen", which easily outsold Sam Cooke's original version in the UK. It was recorded at EMI's Abbey Road Studios, with whistling by Mike Sammes, and released through Top Rank Records. Unusually, Douglas also had four consecutive number nine placings on the UK singles chart.

In 1961, Douglas entered the A Song For Europe contest with his song "The Girl Next Door", but was unsuccessful. He also starred in the 1962 film It's Trad, Dad!

Douglas topped the bill on the Beatles' first major stage show, although their emergence ultimately spelt the end of Douglas's chart career. His final hit record came in February 1963, when "Town Crier" entered the chart; it peaked at number 36.

Douglas continued to perform, with bookings at night clubs and on cruise ships. Until 2010, Douglas toured venues across the UK, including the Medina Theatre on the Isle of Wight. He appeared at the Amersham Rock 'n' Roll Club on 11 December 2010, at an event in his benefit. John Leyton, Mike Berry and the Flames all took part, while Jet Harris and other celebrities attended. Douglas sang three songs from his wheelchair at the close of the concert. He suffered from a rare condition that affected his legs. Sky News filmed the event.

On 18 April 2011, a rare Douglas recording saw a limited 7" vinyl reissue of "Don't Mind If I Cry", produced by Tony Hatch, on the UK-based Spoke Records label. This had previously been the B-side to Douglas's 1969 release, "Raindrops Keep Fallin' On My Head", a cover of the B.J. Thomas song. Douglas's 2011 album, The Craig Douglas Project, included his versions of "Auberge" and "Creep".

== Death ==
Douglas died on 4 September 2026 following a short illness, at the age of 85.

== Discography ==
=== Albums ===
==== Studio albums ====
- Craig Douglas (1960) – UK number 17
- Bandwagon Ball (1961)
- Our Favourite Melodies (1962) – SWE number 10
- Looking Back: Greatest Hits (2005) – tracks re-recorded
- The Golden Anniversary Album (2008) – tracks re-recorded
- The Craig Douglas Project (2011)

==== Compilation albums ====
- Oh Lonesome Me (1981)
- Only 16 (1984)
- The Best of the EMI Years (1993)
- The Very Best of Craig Douglas (2004)
- Only Sixteen (2019)

=== Singles ===
Year	Single	Peak chart positions				
Year	Single	UK	AUS	BE (WA)	NL	NOR
1958	"Sitting in a Tree House"	—	—	—	—	—
1958	"Are You Really Mine"	—	—	—	—	—
1959	"Come Softly to Me"	—	—	—	—	—
1959	"A Teenager in Love"	13	—	—	—	—
1959	"Only Sixteen"	1	—	5	12	1
1959	"Wish It Were Me"	—	—	—	—	—
1960	"Pretty Blue Eyes"	4	—	—	20	—
1960	"Heart of a Teenage Girl"	10	—	—	—	—
1960	"Oh! What a Day"	43	—	—	—	—
1960	"Where's the Girl (I Never Met)"	—	—	—	—	—
1961	"The Girl Next Door"	—	—	—	—	—
1961	"A Hundred Pounds of Clay" (Note: Douglas recorded two versions, JAR 555 and 556, the latter bowdlerised for religious sensibilities)	9	—	49	—	8
1961	"Time"	9	11	—	—	—
1961	"No Greater Love"	—	88	—	—	—
1962	"Another You"	—	—	—	—	—
1962	"When My Little Girl Is Smiling"	9	—	—	—	—
1962	"Our Favorite Melodies"	9	73	—	—	—
1962	"Oh, Lonesome Me"	15	—	—	—	—
1963	"Town Crier"	36	—	—	—	—
1963	"Danke Schoen"	—	—	—	—	—
1963	"I'm So Glad I Found Her"	—	—	—	—	—
1963	"From Russia with Love"	—	—	—	—	—
1964	"Silly Boy"	—	—	—	—	—
1964	"Come Closer" (as Craig Douglas and the Tridents)	—	—	—	—	—
1965	"Across the Street"	—	—	—	—	—
1965	"Around the Corner"	—	—	—	—	—
1966	"I'm on the Outside Looking In"	—	—	—	—	—
1969	"How Do You Feel About That"	—	—	—	—	—
1969	"Raindrops Keep Falling on My Head"	—	—	—	—	—
1971	"All Kinds of People" (with the Grafty Green Gang)	—	—	—	—	—
1976	"Who's Sorry Now?" (featuring the Dougettes)	—	—	—	—	—
1977	"Turn Away"	—	—	—	—	—
1983	"Love Is a Carousel"	—	—	—	—	—
"—" denotes releases that did not chart or were not released.

== Releases on the Top Rank label ==
- BUY049: Craig Douglas – album – UK Albums Chart – Number 17
- 35/103: Bandwagon Ball – album
- JAR110: "Come Softly to Me" / "Golden Girl" – single
- JAR133: "A Teenager in Love" / "The 39 Steps" – single
- JAR159: "Only Sixteen" / "My First Love Affair" – single
- JAR204: "Wish It Were Me" / "The Riddle of Love" – single
- JAR268: "Pretty Blue Eyes" / "Sandy" – single
- JAR340: "The Heart of a Teenage Girl" / "New Boy" – single
- JAR406: "Oh What a Day" / "Why Why Why" – single
- JAR515: "Where's the Girl (I Never Met)" / "My Hour of Love" – single
- JAR543: "The Girl Next Door" / "Hey Mister Conscience" – single
- JAR555: "A Hundred Pounds of Clay" / "Hello Spring" – single (A-side uncensored)
- JAR556: "A Hundred Pounds of Clay" / "Hello Spring" – single
- JAR569: "Time" / "After All" – single
- JAR589: "No Greater Love" / "We'll Have a Lot to Tell the Children" – single
- JAR603: "A Change of Heart" / "Another You" – single
- JAR610: "When My Little Girl is Smiling" / "Ring-A-Ding" – single
- JKR8033: "Craig Sings For Roxy" – EP

== See also ==
- List of artists who reached number one on the UK Singles Chart
- List of UK Singles Chart number ones of the 1950s
- List of UK Singles Chart number ones of the 1950s
- United Kingdom in the Eurovision Song Contest 1961
