= Cliff Nobles =

American soul singer (1941–2008)

- Born: Clifford James Nobles; August 4, 1941; Grove Hill, Alabama, United States
- Died: October 12, 2008 (aged 67) Norristown, Pennsylvania, United States
- Genres: Soul
- Occupation: Singer

Clifford James Nobles (August 4, 1941 – October 12, 2008) was an American soul singer, who is best known for his instrumental hit, "The Horse" -- a track on which he does not actually perform.

== Biography ==
Nobles was born in Grove Hill, Alabama, United States; grew up in Mobile, Alabama; and began singing in high school as a member of a local group, the Delroys. He moved to Philadelphia and recorded three singles for Atlantic Records, none of which charted. While living in a commune in Norristown, Pennsylvania, he formed a group, Cliff Nobles & Co., with bassist Benny Williams, guitarist Bobby Tucker, and drummer Robert Marshall. They recorded demos and, with the help of songwriter/record producer Jesse James, landed a recording contract with Phil-L.A. of Soul Records.

Their second release for the record label was the single "Love Is All Right" b/w "The Horse", which featured the horn section from what would later be known as MFSB. "The Horse" was simply an instrumental version of the A-side, and Nobles, who was the lead singer, does not actually play on the track at all. Nevertheless, it caught fire at radio stations and became a hit, peaking at number 2 for three weeks on the U.S. Billboard Hot 100 chart in 1968, as well as number 2 on the R&B Singles chart. It was held out of the number 1 spot by Herb Alpert's "This Guy's in Love with You". In Canada, the song reached number 7. "The Horse" sold a million copies within three months of release, with the gold disc award from the R.I.A.A. made in August 1968. Nobles' record label continued releasing instrumental singles on which Nobles himself did not play a note, though a later single on which Nobles sang narrowly missed the R&B top 40. An album credited to Cliff Nobles & Co., entitled The Horse, was released consisting mostly of instrumentals, and hit number 159 on the Billboard 200 albums chart. In Canada, a further two singles did make the top 100; "Horse Fever" reached number 94, and "Switch It On" reached number 91.

After his music career, Nobles worked in construction and later in the electricity generation industry.

After moving to Norristown, Nobles had a daughter, Yvette Blakeslee (Bradley) in July 1977. Nobles died in Norristown, Pennsylvania, in October 2008, at the age of 67.

== See also ==
- List of 1960s one-hit wonders in the United States
