= Jamie Records =

American record label

Jamie Records is a record label founded in Philadelphia, Pennsylvania, in 1956 by Harold Lipsius (1913–2007) and Allan Sussel (1924–2003). (Note: Harold Lipsious (né Harold Bernard Lipsius; 12 October 1913 Philadelphia – 17 March 2007), among other things, owned Universal One Stop in Philadelphia, an independent distributor.) Their first 45rpm single, "It's Great to Fall in Love"/"Truly" by Marian Caruso, was issued in 1956. The label was named after Allan Sussel's eldest daughter, Jamie Sussel Turner.

== History ==
The label became popular in 1958 with the release of Duane Eddy's "Rebel Rouser"/"Stalkin'", which reached No. 6 on the Billboard Hot 100. Eddy became the mainstay Jamie artist, recording hit after hit, including "Because They're Young" (No. 4) and "Forty Miles of Bad Road" (No. 9). Eddy's last Jamie single "Runaway Pony"/"Just Because" was issued in 1962.

The Jordan Brothers, hailing from Frackville, Pennsylvania, also recorded for Jamie. Their first release was "Send Me Your Picture" and their biggest hit, "Gimme Some Lovin'", was released in the US before the more successful version by the Spencer Davis Group. The Jordans toured with Dick Clark's Caravan of Stars bus tour and appeared on Philadelphia and New Jersey–based TV shows.

The last major charting record on Jamie was released in 1966, when the label issued Crispian St. Peters' "The Pied Piper" in the US (No. 4). Afterwards, the hits came out on their subsidiary labels: "Boogaloo Down Broadway" by the Fantastic Johnny C (No. 7 pop and No. 5 R&B, in 1967) and "The Horse" by Cliff Nobles & Co. (No. 2, No. 2 R&B in 1968) on the Phil-L.A. of Soul label; Brenda and the Tabulations' "Dry Your Eyes" (No. 20, No. 8 R&B) on the Dionn label, 1967; and "Love (Can Make You Happy)" by Mercy which reached No. 2 pop in 1969, on the Sundi label.

== Subsidiary labels ==
- Arctic
- Black Soul
- Caldwell
- Carney
- Charay
- Chestnut
- Cross Fire
- Day Dell
- DePlace
- Dionn
- Dome
- Dynamo
- First Amendment
- Frantic
- Golden Eagle
- Gong Show
- Hercules
- House of Orange
- Important
- Jamie Golden Hits (reissue label)
- Junior
- Lancelot
- LA
- La Louisianne
- Landa
- Le Cam
- Lyndell
- Mean
- Montel
- MSL
- Olympia
- Palm
- Phil-L.A. of Soul
- Philomega
- The Phoenix
- Pic 1
- Poogie
- Roc-Ker
- Romulus
- Ru-Jac
- Showtime
- Silver Dollar
- Soft
- Spindletop
- Stone
- Sundi
- Surprise
- Swamp Dogg Presents
- Talley-Ho
- Tear Drop
- Terri
- Three Speed
- Tiris
- Thunderball
- Top and Bottom
- Trinity
- Turn Ray
- Twin Record Productions
- Uptown
- V-Tone
- Vent
- Wale
- WFIL
- William Hart Corporation
- Wilson

== Roster ==
- Craig Alden
- Arthur K. Adams
- Rex Allen
- Tony Allen and the Wonders
- Anthony and the Sophomores
- Yvonne Baker
- Chuck Barris (Gong Show Records)
- Barry and the Vikings
- Jesse Belvin
- Billy and the Essentials
- Umberto Bindi
- Warren Bloom & Sea of Galilee Singers
- Neil Brian
- Norman Brooks
- Don Blyer and the Tuesdaynighters
- Bobby Bond
- Bobby Bradshaw
- Brenda & the Tabulations
- Jimmy Briggs
- Joe Brown
- Gerald Calvi Orchestra
- Anita Carter
- Carolyn Carter
- Marian Caruso
- Pierre Cavalli Orchestra
- Savannah Churchill
- Claudine Clark
- Sanford Clark
- Johnny Colmus
- Connie Conway
- Don Costa
- Pal Crawford
- Pee Wee Crayton
- Chuck Crayne
- Ann D'Andrea
- Jack Dailey
- Jim Dale
- Dale & Grace (Montel)
- Glenn Darrell Orchestra and Chorus
- Mac Davis
- Robert Byrd (Bobby Day) and his Birdies
- Alan Dean and His Problems
- Roland Dice
- Johnny Dorelli
- Dorothy and the Hesitations
- Lyn Earlington
- Duane Eddy
- Edge of Darkness
- Emily Evans
- Denny Ezba's Gold
- Raymond Le Fevre Orchestra
- Ernie Fields Orchestra
- Dallas Frazier
- Don Forbes
- Girard Gregory
- Peter Hamilton
- Curly Hamner & the Cooper Brothers
- Lee Hazlewood
- Pervis Herder
- Heroes of Cranberry Farm
- Ben Higgins
- Billy Jean Horton
- Darrell Howe
- Howie
- Pookie Hudson
- Leon Huff
- Jimmy Hughes
- Burt Jackson
- Mark James Trio
- Marke Johnson
- Marvin & Johnny
- Miriam Johnson
- Johnny Angel and the Creations
- Johnny and the High Keys
- Al Jones
- Roosevelt Jones
- Dick Jordan
- Jennie Jordan
- Alexandrow Karazov
- Joey Kay
- Ray Kennedy
- Pepe Lattanzi
- Pat Leahy
- Steve Lee
- Sylvia De Leion
- Tony Liss
- Ricky Livid and the Tone Deafs
- Shorty Long & the Santa Fe Rangers
- Barbara Lynn
- Magic Reign
- Rosalie Mann
- Mae Maria and the Maybees
- Marlena
- Mashmakhan
- Barbara Mason
- Lee Maye (aka Arthur Lee Maye and the Crowns)
- Tommy McLain (MSL)
- Johnny Mendell
- Mercy
- Microbop Ensemble
- Stephen Monahan
- Chris Montez
- Carol Murray
- New Hope
- Cliff Nobles (Phil-LA of Soul)
- Jacky Noguez and His Orchestra
- Cindy Owens
- Pal and the Prophets
- Tony Panassi
- Johnny Pearson Orchestra
- Bobby Peterson
- Bobby Please and the Pleasers
- Jamie Power
- Donna Prima
- Rita Raines
- Denny Randall
- Anita Ray
- Chuck Reed
- Rick and the Keens
- Floyd Robinson
- Mark Robinson
- Wayne Rooks
- Dean Scott
- Ray Sharpe
- Timmy Shaw
- Jon Sisco
- Spilt Milk
- Crispian St. Peters
- Lincoln Starr
- Jerry Stevens
- Gene Summers
- Sunny & The Sunliners (Tear Drop Records)
- Arthur Thomas
- Tommo and the Ding Dongs
- Mitchell Torok
- Titus Turner
- Dick Van Dyke
- Jimmy Velvit (Tear Drop Records)
- Los Vivos
- Bill Wright Sr.
- C.L. Weldon and the Pictures
- Wheel of Fortune
- Marty Wilde and the Wild Cats
- J. Frank Wilson
- Sue Winford
- The Aubrey Twins
- The Ballistics
- The Beatle-ettes
- The Blackwells
- The Chell-Mars
- The Cole Brothers
- The Combo Kings
- The Creations
- The Dantes
- The Dovells
- The Emotional Upsets
- The Fantastic Johnny C (Phil-LA of Soul)
- The Five Chords
- The Four J's
- The Four-Evers
- The Goodlettsville Five
- The Inspirations
- The Intentions
- The Intros
- The Jordan Brothers
- The Key Brothers
- The Kit Kats
- The Legends
- The Lolly-Pops
- The Looters
- The Lords of T.O.N.K.
- The Matadors
- The Mechanics
- The New Breed
- The New Silhouettes
- The Pentagons
- The Ragin' Storms
- The Rainbows
- The Revels
- The Riffs
- The Scamps
- The Sharps
- The Sheiks
- The Sherrys
- The Showstoppers (Showtime)
- The Sonics
- The Statesmen
- The Sundowners
- The Teenmakers
- The Timberland Four
- The Tritones
- The Tygers
- The Velaires
- The Waldron Sisters
- The Wil-Ettes
- Shira

== See also ==
- List of record labels
