= Bobby Vee discography =

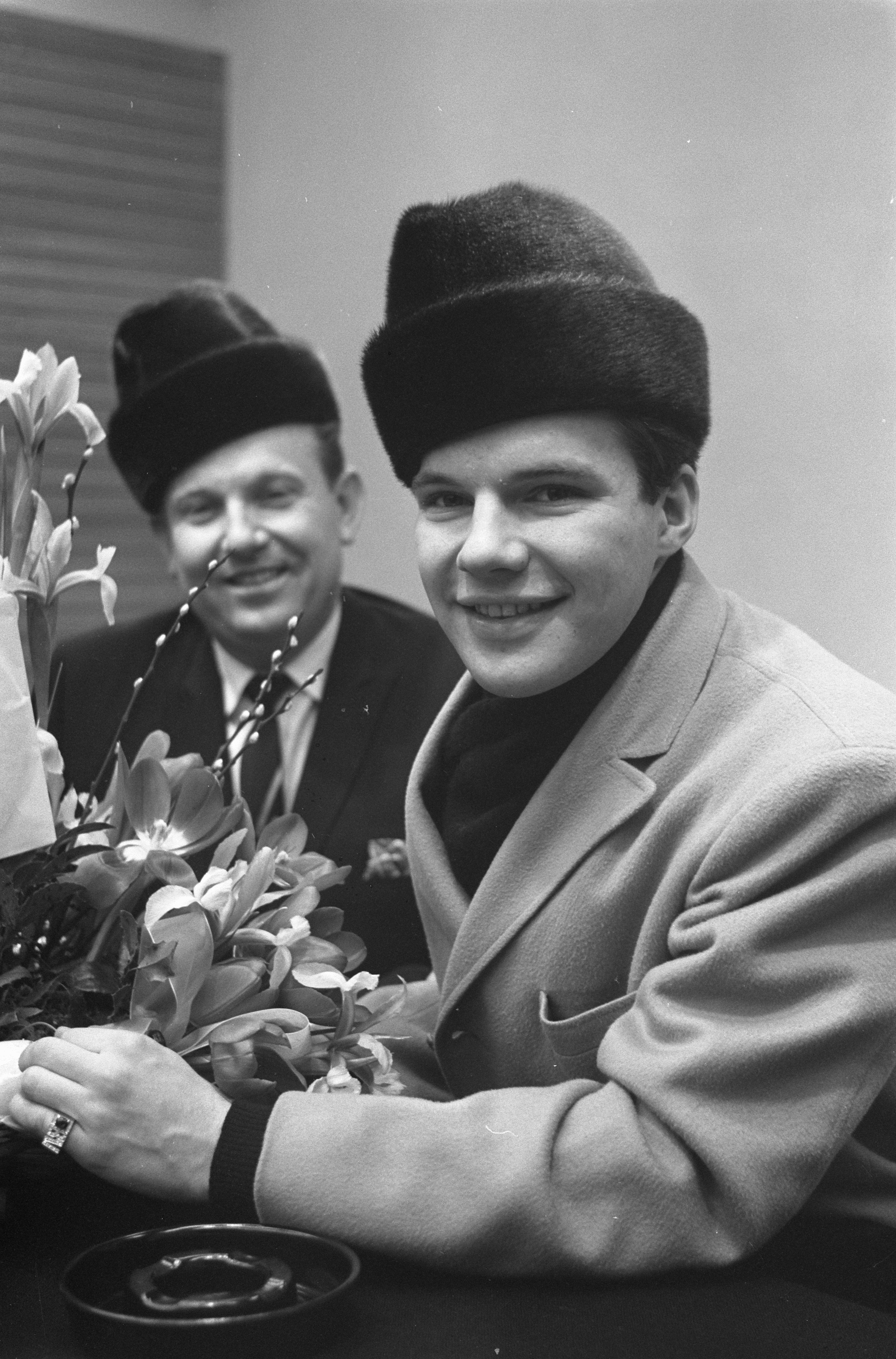
- Bobby Vee in early 1962.
- Studio albums: 23
- Extended plays: 1
- Compilation albums: 7
- Singles: 45
- Collaboration albums: 1
- Live albums: 1

The following is the discography of American singer Bobby Vee. Vee's debut single was released in 1959 titled "Suzie Baby". Distributed by Soma Records, the recording gained enough attention to appear on the Billboard Hot 100 and Vee was signed onto a recording contract by the bigger Liberty Records. Vee's next two singles made lesser but similar chart appearances.

In mid 1960, Vee had his first top 10 hit with "Devil or Angel". The single managed to reach the top 10 on the pop charts, top 25 on the R&B charts, and almost topped the Canadian survey at No. 2. This prompted Liberty to release his first album Bobby Vee Sings Your Favorites, filled up with rock and roll hits. Vee's next two singles became hits as well and were included in his self-titled studio album released in early 1961. That year, Vee had his first and only number-one recording with "Take Good Care of My Baby", which topped the charts in the US and Canada, while also climbing to number 3 in the UK. The following single reached number 2 in the United States soon after.

Liberty continued to release several albums and in late 1962 achieved his second highest-charting hit titled "The Night Has a Thousand Eyes". Earlier that year, Vee made a collaboration album with The Crickets. Bobby Vee Meets the Crickets became Vee's second highest-charting entry on the UK charts, peaking at number 2. In 1963, the extended play Just for Fun topped the charts entirely. However, Bobby Vee's chart performance declined, and none of his records reached the top 40 in 1964 and 1965. An effort to switch this with a live albums Live! On Tour ultimately failed.

In 1967, Vee attained his final top 10 entry and comeback single "Come Back When You Grow Up". Reaching number 3 in the US and number 2 in the Canada, it spawned the namesake album, which reached the bottom-half of the LP charts published Billboard and the upper-half of the Cashbox album chart. A chain of contemporary releases in 1967 and 1968 spawned two more albums, Just Today and Do What You Gotta Do. Vee's final Liberty studio album was released in 1969 titled Gates, Grills & Railings, critically assessed as a change of pace. In 1972, Vee made an effort to come back with the album Nothin' Like a Sunny Day, using his birth name to appeal to mature audiences, but the album failed to sell. Various compilation albums were released during the 1970s and 80s. Notably, The Bobby Vee Singles Album reached No. 5 in the UK and was certified gold.

== Singles ==
Title (A-side/B-side) (Note: The B-sides listed are for the US releases of the singles except where not applicable. Various other songs were released as B-sides to the main A-sides in other countries.)	Year	Label	Peak chart positions						Album
Title (A-side/B-side)	Year	Label	U.S. Billboard Hot 100	U.S. Billboard AC	UK Singles	U.S. Billboard R&B	US Cashbox	Canada CHUM RPM	Album
"Suzie Baby" "Flyin' High" (non-album track)	1959	Soma 1110; Liberty 55208	77 —	— —	— —	— —	— —	— —	Bobby Vee's Golden Greats
"What Do You Want?" "My Love Loves Me"	1960	Liberty 55234	93 —	— —	— —	— —	— —	— —	Non-album tracks
"One Last Kiss" "Laurie" (from Bobby Vee with Strings and Things)	1960	Liberty 55251	112 —	— —	— —	— —	91 —	— —	Bobby Vee
"Devil or Angel" "Since I Met You Baby"	1960	Liberty 55270	6; 81	— —	— —	22 —	4 —	2 —	Bobby Vee Sings Your Favorites
"Rubber Ball" "Everyday" (from Bobby Vee Sings Your Favorites)	1960	Liberty 55287	6 —	— —	4 —	— —	6 —	4 —	Bobby Vee
"Stayin' In" "More Than I Can Say"	1961	Liberty 55296	33; 61	— —	flip 4	— —	32; 48	— —	Bobby Vee
"How Many Tears" "Baby Face"	1961	Liberty 55325	63; 119	— —	10 —	— —	43; 97	— —	Bobby Vee with Strings and Things
"Take Good Care of My Baby" "Bashful Bob" (from Bobby Vee with Strings and Things)	1961	Liberty 55354	1 —	— —	3 —	— —	1 —	1 —	Take Good Care of My Baby
"Run to Him" "Walkin' with My Angel"	1961	Liberty 55388	2; 53	— —	6 —	— —	4; 89	6; 5	Take Good Care of My Baby
"Please Don't Ask About Barbara" "I Can't Say Goodbye"	1962	Liberty 55419	15; 92	— —	29 —	— —	18; 90	3 —	A Bobby Vee Recording Session
"Sharing You" "At A Time Like This" (non-album track) / "In My Baby's Eyes"	1962	Liberty 55451	15 —	— —	10 —	— —	20; 121	— —	A Bobby Vee Recording Session
"Punish Her" "Someday (When I'm Gone from You)" (from Bobby Vee Meets the Crickets)	1962	Liberty 55479	20; 99	— —	— —	— —	32; 129	— —	Bobby Vee's Golden Greats
"A Forever Kind of Love" "Remember Me, Huh?" (from Take Good Care of My Baby) U.K. release only	1962	Liberty 10046	— —	— —	13 —	— —	— —	— —	A Bobby Vee Recording Session
"The Night Has a Thousand Eyes" "Anonymous Phone Call"	1962	Liberty 55521	3; 110	2 —	3 —	8 —	4; 108	2 —	The Night Has a Thousand Eyes
"Charms" "Bobby Tomorrow" (Non-album track)	1963	Liberty 55530	13 —	5 —	— 21	— —	15 —	20 —	Bobby Vee Golden Greats, Volume 2
"Be True to Yourself" "A Letter from Betty" (Non-album track)	1963	Liberty 55581	34; 85	— —	— —	— —	36; 100	15	Bobby Vee Golden Greats, Volume 2
"Never Love a Robin" "Yesterday and You"	1963	Liberty 55636	99; 55	— —	— —	— —	101; 53	— —	Bobby Vee Golden Greats, Volume 2
"Stranger in Your Arms" "1963"	1964	Liberty 55654	83 —	— —	— —	— —	90	— —	Non-album tracks
"I'll Make You Mine" "She's Sorry"	1964	Liberty 55670	52 —	— —	— —	— —	54 —	— —	The New Sound from England!
"Hickory, Dick and Doc" "I Wish You Were Mine Again" (non-album track)	1964	Liberty 55700	63 —	— —	— —	— —	81 —	18 —	Bobby Vee Golden Greats, Volume 2
"Where Is She" "How to Make a Farewell"	1964	Liberty 55726	120 —	— —	— —	— —	— —	— —	Non-album tracks
"Every Little Bit Hurts" "Pretend You Don't See Her"	1964	Liberty 55751	84; 97	— —	— —	— —	89; 80	— —	Bobby Vee Golden Greats, Volume 2
"Cross My Heart" "This Is the End" (non-album track)	1965	Liberty 55761	99 —	— —	— —	— —	101 —	— —	Bobby Vee Golden Greats, Volume 2
"Keep On Trying" "You Won't Forget Me" (from The Night Has a Thousand Eyes)	1965	Liberty 55790	85 —	— —	— —	— —	84 —	— —	Bobby Vee Golden Greats, Volume 2
"True Love Never Runs Smooth" "Hey Little Girl" U.K. release only	1965	Liberty 10213	— —	— —	— —	— —	— —	— —	Non-album tracks
"Run Like the Devil" "Take a Look Around Me" (non-album track)	1965	Liberty 55828	124 —	— —	— —	— —	106 —	— —	Do What You Gotta Do
"High Coin" "The Story Of My Life"	1965	Liberty 55843	— —	— —	— —	— —	— —	— —	Non-album tracks
"A Girl I Used to Know" "Gone" (non-album track)	1966	Liberty 55854	133 —	— —	— —	— —	— —	— —	Bobby Vee Golden Greats, Volume 2
"Look at Me Girl" "Save a Love" (non-album track) Original A-side: "Butterfly" (non-album track, did not chart)	1966	Liberty 55877	52 —	— —	— —	— —	67 —	53 —	Look at Me Girl
"Before You Go" "Here Today" (non-album track)	1966	Liberty 55921	— —	— —	— —	— —	— —	— —	Non-album tracks
"Come Back When You Grow Up" "That's All in the Past" (from Look at Me Girl) Later B-side: "Swahili Serenade" (Non-album track)	1967	Liberty 55964	3 —	— —	— —	— —	3 —	2 —	Come Back When You Grow Up
"Beautiful People" "I May Be Gone" (from Come Back When You Grow Up)	1967	Liberty 56009	37 —	— —	— —	— —	27 —	19 —	Just Today
"Maybe Just Today" "You're a Big Girl Now" (from Come Back When You Grow Up)	1968	Liberty 56014	46 —	— —	— —	— —	38 —	35 —	Just Today
"Medley: My Girl/Hey Girl" "Just Keep It Up (And See What Happens)"	1968	Liberty 56033	35 —	— —	— —	— —	17 —	7 —	Just Today
"Do What You Gotta Do" "Thank You"	1968	Liberty 56057	83 —	— —	— —	— —	65 —	62 —	Do What You Gotta Do
"(I'm Into Lookin' For) Someone to Love Me" "Thank You" (from Do What You Gotta Do)	1968	Liberty 56080	98 —	— —	— —	— —	92 —	84 —	Gates, Grills & Railings
"Jenny Came to Me" "Santa Cruz"	1969	Liberty 56096	— —	— —	— —	— —	— —	— —	Non-album tracks
"Let's Call It a Day Girl" "I'm Gonna Make It Up to You"	1969	Liberty 56124	92 —	— —	— —	— —	97; 132	79 —	Non-album tracks
"In and Out of Love" "Electric Trains and You"	1970	Liberty 56149	111 —	— —	— —	— —	105 —	— —	Non-album tracks
"Woman in My Life" "No Obligation"	1970	Liberty 56178	— —	— —	— —	— —	— —	— —	Non-album tracks
"Sweet Sweetheart" "Rock and Roll Music and You"	1970	Liberty 56208	88 —	— —	— —	— —	94 —	— —	Non-album tracks
"Signs" "Something to Say"	1971	United Artists 50755	— —	— —	— —	— —	125 —	— —	Non-album tracks
"Take Good Care of My Baby (acoustic)" "Every Opportunity" (released under the name "Robert Thomas Velline")	1973	United Artists XW199-W, UP 35516	— —	— —	— —	— —	— —	— —	Nothin' Like a Sunny Day
"Loving You" "Saying Goodbye"	1975	Shady Brook 013	— —	37 —	— —	— —	— —	— —	Non-album tracks
"Well All Right" "Something Has Come Between Us"	1978	United Artists UP 36370	— —	— —	— —	— —	— —	— —	Non-album tracks

== EPs ==
Year of release	Titles (A-side, B-side) Both sides from same album except where indicated	Label	Chart positions
Year of release	Titles (A-side, B-side) Both sides from same album except where indicated	Label	UK
1963	Just for Fun: Features The Crickets, Vee sang two songs, "All You've Got to Do is Touch Me" & "The Night Has a Thousand Eyes" in the film; Vee's only Extended play	Liberty 2084	1

== Albums ==
=== Studio albums ===
Note: Cashbox featured separate charts for stereo and mono albums until 1965 when both charts were merged into one.

Release date	Album	Label	Chart Positions			
Release date	Album	Label	Billboard 200	Cashbox Mono	Cashbox Stereo	UK Albums Chart
1960	Bobby Vee Sings Your Favorites	Liberty LRP-3165 (Mono)/LST-7165 (Stereo)	—	—	—	—
1961	Bobby Vee	Liberty LRP-3181/LST-7181	18	46	—	—
1961	Bobby Vee with Strings and Things	Liberty LRP-3186/LST-7186	—	47	—	—
1961	Bobby Vee Sings Hits of the Rockin' 50's	Liberty LRP-3205/LST-7205	85	—	—	20
1961	Take Good Care of My Baby	Liberty LRP-3211/LST-7211	91	29	29	7
1962	A Bobby Vee Recording Session	Liberty LRP-3232/LST-7232	121	—	—	10
1962	Bobby Vee Meets the Crickets	Liberty LRP-3228/LST-7228	42	—	—	2
1962	Merry Christmas from Bobby Vee	Liberty LRP-3267/LST-7267	136	—	—	—
1963	The Night Has a Thousand Eyes	Liberty LRP-3285/LST-7285	102	51	—	15
1963	Bobby Vee Meets the Ventures	Liberty LRP-3289/LST-7289	91	37	—	—
1963	I Remember Buddy Holly	Liberty LRP-3336/LST-7336	—	54	—	—
1964	Bobby Vee Sings the New Sound from England!	Liberty LRP-3352/LST-7352	146	—	—	—
1964	30 Big Hits of the 60's	Liberty LRP-3385/LST-7385	—	95	—	
1965	Live! On Tour	Liberty LRP-3393/LST-7393	—	—		—
1966	30 Big Hits of the 60's, Volume 2	Liberty LRP-3448/LST-7448	—	—		—
1966	Look at Me Girl	Liberty LRP-3480/LST-7480	—	102		—
1967	Come Back When You Grow Up	Liberty LRP-3534/LST-7534	66	37		—
1968	Just Today	Liberty LRP-3554/LST-7554	187	—		—
1968	Do What You Gotta Do	Liberty LST-7592	—	—		—
1969	Gates, Grills & Railings	Liberty LST-7612	—	—		—
1972	Nothin' Like a Sunny Day (released under the name "Robert Thomas Velline")	United Artists UAS 5656	—	—		—
1999	Down the Line	RHP Rockhouse Productions RS-5999-1	—	—		—
2002	I Wouldn't Change a Thing	RHP Rockhouse Productions	—	—		—
2003	The Ultimate Christmas	RHP Rockhouse Productions	—	—		—
2005	Last Of The Great Rhythm Guitar Players	RG Pegasus Productions PEG CD 556	—	—		—
2014	The Adobe Sessions	RHP Rockhouse Productions	—	—		—

=== Compilation albums ===
Release date	Album	Label	Chart positions		
Release date	Album	Label	Billboard	Cashbox Mono	Cashbox Stereo
1962	Bobby Vee's Golden Greats	Liberty LRP-3245/LST-7245	24	22	—
1966	Bobby Vee Golden Greats, Volume 2	Liberty LRP-3464/LST-7464	—	—	
1973	Legendary Masters Series	United Artists UA-LA025-G2	—	—	
1975	The Very Best of Bobby Vee	United Artists UA-LA 332E	—	—	
1980	The Bobby Vee Singles Album	United Artists UA-G3 0253	—	—	
2008	The Very Best of Bobby Vee	One Day Music DAY2CD148	—	—	
2011	Rarities	EMI UK 9072062	—	—	

- The Very Best of Bobby Vee (May 12, 2008) was certified silver in the UK.
- The Bobby Vee Singles Album reached number 5 in the UK in April 1980 and was certified gold in the UK.

== Soundtracks ==
Year	Album
1967	C'mon, Let's Live a Little: a Don Crawford soundtrack for the Paramount Pictures flim.; Vee performs four songs — "Instant Girl", "What Fool This Mortal Be", "Over and Over", and a duet with co-star Jackie DeShannon on "Back-Talk"
