= Bobby Vee's Golden Greats =

Compilation album by Bobby Vee
- Released: November 1962
- Recorded: 1959–1962
- Genre: Rock and roll
- Length: 34:01
- Label: Liberty
- Producer: Snuff Garrett

Bobby Vee chronology
Bobby Vee Meets the Crickets (1962)	Bobby Vee's Golden Greats (1962)	Merry Christmas from Bobby Vee (1962)

Singles from Bobby Vee's Golden Greats
- 1. "Punish Her" Released: August 10, 1962

Bobby Vee's Golden Greats is a compilation album by American singer Bobby Vee that was released in November 1962 by Liberty Records. It was Vee's first greatest hits compilation on the Liberty label. He had as the major influences in his career his personal manager Arnold Mills and record producer, Snuff Garrett.

The album debuted on the Billboard Top LPs chart in the issue dated November 3, 1962, and remained on the chart for 44 weeks, peaking at No. 24. It climbed to No. 22 on the Cashbox Best-Selling Monaural Albums chart during its 19-week run on it. It was more successful in The UK, where it spent for 14 weeks on the album chart there peaking at No. 10. The single, "Punish Her", debuted on the Billboard Hot 100 in the issue dated September 1, 1962, peaking at number 20 during its eight-week stay. On the Cashbox Top 100 Singles, it reached number 32 during its eight-week stay.

== Compact disc ==
The album was released on compact disc by Beat Goes On on October 28, 2003, as tracks 1 through 12 on a pairing of two albums on one CD with tracks 13 through 24 consisting of Vee's 1966 Compilation album, Bobby Vee's Golden Greats Vol. 2.

== Reception ==
Professional ratings
Review scores
Source	Rating
AllMusic	3.5/5 stars
New Record Mirror	4/5 stars
The Encyclopedia of Popular Music	4/5 stars
Disc	3/5 stars

William Ruhlmann of AllMusic said that "it captures him thoroughly in his Buddy Holly mode, and the effect is extremely haunting. Otherwise, every track here earned its place on the album, it helps to make a significant part of this album a tribute to Holly. As a hits compilation, this is an above-average release."

Billboard selected the album for a "Spotlight Album" review, stating that it featured "A potent line-up of hit tunes by the hit-maker that spells sales in all sort of location."

New Record Mirror raved, "Bobby is right back at the top of the pop tree and looks set for a long time to come."

Hunter Nigel of Disc wrote in his review that "Take Good Care of My Baby and Someday, which he does with the Crickets come off best". The Honolulu Advertiser called it "another par-favorite."

== Track listing ==
=== Side one ===
No.	Title	Writer(s)	Length
1.	"Take Good Care of My Baby"	Carole King, Gerry Goffin	2:27
2.	"Devil or Angel"	Blanche Carter	2:17
3.	"Punish Her"	Neval Nader, John Gluck	1:52
4.	"Suzie Baby"	Bobby Vee	2:48
5.	"Walkin' with My Angel"	Goffin, King	2:14
6.	"Stayin' In"	John D. Loudermilk	2:03
7.	"Run to Him"	Gerry Goffin, Jack Keller	2:07

=== Side two ===
No.	Title	Writer(s)	Length
1.	"Rubber Ball"	A. Orlowski Aaron Schroeder	2:17
2.	"Please Don't Ask About Barbara"	Bill Buchanan, Jack Keller	2:03
3.	"How Many Tears"	Carole King, Gerry Goffin	2:03
4.	"Everyday"	Buddy Holly, Norman Petty	2:10
5.	"Sharing You"	Gerry Goffin, Carole King	2:03
6.	"One Last Kiss"	Charles Strouse, Lee Adams	1:58
7.	"More Than I Can Say"	Sonny Curtis, Jerry Allison	2:26
8.	"Someday (When I'm Gone From You)" (Featuring The Crickets)	Tom Lesslie, Dick Glasser	2:10

== Charts ==
Chart performance for Bobby Vee's Golden Greats
Chart (1962)	Peak position
US Billboard Top LPs	24
US Cashbox Best-Selling Monaural Albums	22
UK Record Retailer Top Albums	10

Singles

Single	Year	Chart	Peak position
"Punish Her"	1962	US Billboard Hot 100	20
"Punish Her"	1962	US Cashbox Top 100 Singles	32

== Billboard & UK singles chart positions for previously Singles ==
Song	US chart debut	Hot 100	U.S. Cashbox	UK chart debut	UK singles chart
"Suzie Baby"	August 29, 1959	77	–	–	–
"One Last Kiss"	May 23, 1960	112	91	–	–
"Devil or Angel"	August 1, 1960	13	4	–	–
"Rubber Ball"	November 28, 1960	6	6	January 25, 1961	4
"Stayin' In"	February 27, 1961	33	32	April 19, 1961	4
"More Than I Can Say"	February 27, 1961	61	1	April 19, 1961	4
"How Many Tears"	May 29, 1961	63	43	August 9, 1961	10
"Take Good Care of My Baby"	August 7, 1961	1	1	November 1, 1961	3
"Run to Him"	November 13, 1961	2	4	December 27, 1961	6
"Walking with My Angel"	November 27, 1961	53	89	–	–
"Please Don't Ask About Barbara"	February 24, 1962	15	18	March 24, 1962	29
"Sharing You"	May 19, 1962	15	20	June 10, 1962	10
