= Bobby Vee's Golden Greats Vol. 2 =

Compilation album by Bobby Vee
- Released: November 1966
- Recorded: 1963–1965
- Genre: Pop
- Length: 29:38
- Label: Liberty
- Producer: Snuff Garrett

Bobby Vee chronology
Look at Me Girl (1966)	Bobby Vee's Golden Greats Vol. 2 (1966)	Come Back When You Grow Up (1967)

Bobby Vee's Golden Greats Vol. 2 is a compilation album by American singer Bobby Vee that was released in November 1966 by Liberty Records. It was Vee's second greatest hits compilation on the Liberty label.

The compilation album featured Vee's two top 20 hit singles - "The Night Has a Thousand Eyes" and "Charms" - together with a range of lesser hits tracks from earlier releases and one new recent hit, "A Girl I Used to Know". the single from the album, "A Girl I Used to Know" bubbled under Billboard's Hot 100, on February 26, 1966, at number 133 during its 2-weeks stay on the chart.

The album was released on compact disc by Beat Goes On on October 28, 2003, as tracks 13 through 24 on a pairing of two albums on one CD with tracks 1 through 12 consisting of Vee's 1962 compilation album, Bobby Vee's Golden Greats.

== Reception ==
Professional ratings
Review scores
Source	Rating
AllMusic	3.5/5 stars
The Encyclopedia of Popular Music	3/5 stars
Billboard	4/5 stars

Bruce Eder of AllMusic said that the album "even the more recent contents of this album come across as dated. Ironically, Vee's albums of the period captured him pursuing a much more contemporary sound -- very effectively, one might add -- than that represented by most of the dozen recordings included here, and they're generally a much better place to start than this collection, in terms of understanding Vee or the full range of his talent."

Honolulu Star-Advertiser noted "While this will delight the Vee fans, it lacks the true hit luster as in the first volume", although pointing out "The Night Has a Thousand Eyes" and "I'll Make You Mine" as highlights.

== Track listing ==
Side one
No.	Title	Writer(s)	Length
1.	"Charms"	Helen Miller, Howard Greenfield	2:23
2.	"Cross My Heart"	Sonny Curtis	2:08
3.	"The Night Has a Thousand Eyes"	Ben Weisman, Dorothy Wayne, Marilyn Garrett	2:34
4.	"I'll Make You Mine"	Robert Thomas Velline	2:22
5.	"Never Love a Robin"	Artie Resnick, Mickey Gentile	2:41
6.	"Armen's Theme"	Ross Bagdasarian	2:16

Side two
No.	Title	Writer(s)	Length
1.	"Ev'ry Little Bit Hurts"	Thomas Lesslie Garrett	2:37
2.	"Hickory, Dick and Doc"	DeWayne Blackwell	2:27
3.	"Keep On Trying"	Van McCoy	2:35
4.	"A Girl I Used to Know"	Jack Clement	2:36
5.	"Pretend You Don't See Her"	Steve Allen	2:18
6.	"Be True to Yourself"	Burt Bacharach, Hal David	2:03

== Charts ==
=== Singles ===
Single	Year	Chart	Peak position
"A Girl I Used to Know"	1966	US Billboard Hot 100	133

== Billboard & UK singles chart positions for previously Singles ==
Song	US chart debut	Hot 100	Easy Listening	U.S. Cashbox	UK chart debut	UK singles chart
"The Night Has a Thousand Eyes"	December 8, 1962	3	2	4	February 13, 1963	3
"Charms"	March 30, 1963	13	5	15	–	–
"Be True to Yourself"	June 22, 1963	34	–	36	–	–
"Yesterday and You"	November 9, 1963	55	–	53	–	–
"Never Love a Robin"	December 28, 1963	99	–	101	–	–
"I'll Make You Mine"	February 22, 1964	52	–	54	–	–
"Hickory, Dick and Doc"	May 30, 1964	63	–	81	–	–
"Pretend You Don't See Her"	December 5, 1964	97	–	80	–	–
"Every Little Bit Hurts"	December 12, 1964	84	–	89	–	–
"Cross My Heart"	February 6, 1965	99	–	102	–	–
"Keep On Trying"	May 8, 1965	85	–	84	–	–
