= The Night Has a Thousand Eyes =

The Night Has a Thousand Eyes may refer to:

- "The Night Has a Thousand Eyes" (jazz standard), a song written by Jerome (Jerry) Brainin and Buddy Bernier for the 1948 film Night Has a Thousand Eyes
- The Night Has a Thousand Eyes (album), a 1963 album by Bobby Vee, which contained the single:
  - "The Night Has a Thousand Eyes" (song), written by Benjamin Weisman, Dorothy Wayne, and Marilynn Garrett made popular by Bobby Vee
- Night Has a Thousand Eyes, a 1948 American film based on
  - Night Has a Thousand Eyes, a novel by Cornell Woolrich published under the pseudonym "George Hopley"
- "The Night Has a Thousand Eyes", a poem by Francis William Bourdillon
