= Down the Line (album) =

Studio album by Bobby Vee
- Released: June 22, 1999
- Recorded: 1996
- Genre: Rock and roll
- Length: 42:01
- Label: Rockhouse Studios
- Producers: Bobby Vee, Jeff Vee

Bobby Vee chronology
Nothin' Like a Sunny Day (1972)	Down the Line (1999)	I Wouldn't Change a Thing (2002)

Down the Line is the 21st studio album by American singer Bobby Vee, released on June 22, 1999, by Rockhouse Studios, his first studio album in 27 years. It was produced by Vee and his son, Jeff, and arranged and conducted by Greg Armstrong and Jeff Vee with the help of his three sons, as a tribute to Buddy Holly whom Vee listed among his influences. After Holly was killed on February 3, 1959, along with Ritchie Valens, the Big Bopper, and pilot Roger Peterson when their plane crashed in Iowa on their way to Fargo, North Dakota, Vee was selected to replace Holly on the tour, which led to the launch of his recording career. He also released another Holly album in 1963 called I Remember Buddy Holly.

The album was recorded in 1996 and it took three years to make, featuring his greatest hits, it also included a new, re-recorded version of "Love's Made a Fool of You", which previously appeared on his 1961 album Bobby Vee with Strings and Things, and "It Doesn't Matter Anymore", and "Maybe Baby", which both previously appeared on his 1963 album I Remember Buddy Holly. His wife Karen was Exec Activities, and his daughter Karen designed their cover.

Vee later said that this is his personal favourite album.

== Reception ==
Professional ratings
Review scores
Source	Rating
AllMusic	4.5/5 stars
The Encyclopedia of Popular Music	3/5 stars
Amazon	5/5 stars

Bruce Eder of AllMusic praises "he has assembled a trio that isn't bad when it comes to emulating and modernizing (without destroying) the sound of the Crickets or Holly's post-Crickets work – and there's a moment or two when they could pass for the Stray Cats; and even more impressively, Vee co-produced this record."

The Star Tribune praised Bobby for keeping Buddy Holly's spirit alive and mentioned that "as 'Rock Me, My and he did a broken version a demo of 'Love Is What's the market for this CD".

In Rock N Roll Gold Rush: A Singles Un-Cyclopedia: Maury Dean praise {Bobby] "for his greatest voices of all time."

Robert Reynolds mentions, "Several tunes are done up similar to the Buddy Holly originals, however, many other songs are given pleasant new arrangements."

== Track listing ==
=== Side one ===
No.	Title	Writer(s)	Length
1.	"Down The Line"	Buddy Holly, Bob Montgomery	2:13
2.	"Rock Me My Baby"	Shorty Long, Susan Heather	2:39
3.	"Rave On"	Sonny West, Bill Tilghman, Buddy Holly	2:15
4.	"Midnight Shift"	Earl Lee, Jimmie Airsworth	2:21
5.	"Tell Me How"	Buddy Holly, Norman Petty, Jerry Allison	2:43
6.	"Love's Made a Fool of You"	Buddy Holly	2:46
7.	"It Doesn't Matter Anymore"	Paul Anka	2:38

=== Side two ===
No.	Title	Writer(s)	Length
1.	"I'm Gonna Love You Too"	Joe B. Mauldin, Niki Sullivan, Norman Petty	2:39
2.	"Blue Days, Black Nights"	Ben Hall	2:14
3.	"Love Is Strange"	Ethel Smith	3:39
4.	"(You're So Square) Baby I Don't Care"	Jerry Leiber, Mike Stoller	2:32
5.	"Fool's Paradise"	Sonny LeGlaire, Horace Linsley, Norman Petty	3:11
6.	"Maybe Baby"	Norman Petty	2:11
7.	"Holly Hop"	Ella Holley	2:20
8.	"Words of Love/Listen to Me"	Buddy Holly, Brian Wilson	4:30

2000 CD reissue
No.	Title	Writer(s)	Length
1.	"Down The Line"	Buddy Holly, Bob Montgomery	2:13
2.	"Rock Me My Baby"	Shorty Long, Susan Heather	2:39
3.	"Rave On"	Sonny West, Bill Tilghman, Buddy Holly	2:21
4.	"Midnight Shift"	Earl Lee, Jimmie Airsworth	2:21
5.	"Look at Me"	Buddy Holly	2:53
6.	"Tell Me How"	Buddy Holly, Norman Petty, Jerry Allison	2:43
7.	"Love's Made a Fool of You"	Buddy Holly	2:46
8.	"It Doesn't Matter Anymore"	Paul Anka	2:38
9.	"I'm Gonna Love You Too"	Joe B. Mauldin, Niki Sullivan, Norman Petty	2:39
10.	"Blue Days, Black Nights"	Ben Hall	2:14
11.	"Love Is Strange"	Ethel Smith	3:39
12.	"Changin' All Those Changes"	Buddy Holly	3:24
13.	"Buddy Holly Medley: What To Do / Crying, Waiting, Hoping / Learning the Game"	Buddy Holly	3:47
14.	"(You're So Square) Baby I Don't Care"	Jerry Leiber, Mike Stoller	2:32
15.	"Fool's Paradise"	Sonny LeGlaire, Horace Linsley, Norman Petty	3:11
16.	"Maybe Baby"	Norman Petty	2:11
17.	"Holly Hop"	Ella Holley	2:20
18.	"Words of Love/Listen to Me"	Buddy Holly, Brian Wilson	4:29

== Personnel ==
- Bobby Vee – vocals
- Greg Armstrong, Jeff Vee – arranger, conductor
- Tommy Vee – Bass, Backing Vocal
- Hillary Vermillion – Cello
- Dan Neale, Robby Vee, – guitar
- Jeff Vee – Drums
- Coca Bochonko, Karen Bottge, Marion Judish, Thea Stockinger – Strings
