= Come Back When You Grow Up (album) =

Studio album by Bobby Vee and the Strangers
- Released: October 1967
- Genre: Pop
- Length: 29:10
- Label: Liberty
- Producer: Dallas Smith

Bobby Vee and the Strangers chronology
Bobby Vee's Golden Greats Vol. 2 (1966)	Come Back When You Grow Up (1967)	Just Today (1968)

Singles from Come Back When You Grow Up
- 1. "Come Back When You Grow Up" Released: June 9, 1967

Come Back When You Grow Up is the sixteenth studio album by American singer Bobby Vee and the Strangers and was released in October 1967 by Liberty Records. This was the last album to feature Vee's backup band, the Strangers. The album contained the lead single "Come Back When You Grow Up".

According to Robert Reynolds, in The Music of Bobby Vee, "it was a surprising comeback for him. Although music in general had changed, this album is reminiscent of the LPs he put out during earlier years, with this material all being fresh and new."

== Chart performance ==
The album debuted on the Billboard Top LPs chart on October 7, 1967, remaining on the chart for 12 weeks and peaking at No. 66. It reached No. 37 on the Cashbox albums chart in a 13-week run on it. The album's "title track" made its debut on the Billboard Hot 100 chart on July 22, 1967, eventually spending three weeks at number three during its 16-week stay, as well as reaching number three on the Cashbox singles chart and number two in Canada. The single placed at number 15 on Billboard magazine's Year-End Hot 100 for 1967, It was Vee's sixth and final top-ten hit on the Billboard Hot 100, the first being "Devil or Angel" in 1960.

== Later releases ==
The album was released on compact disc by Collectables Records on October 17, 2000, as tracks 1 through 12 on a pairing of two albums on one CD with tracks 13 through 24 consisting of Vee's collaborative album from June 1963, Bobby Vee Meets the Ventures. It was also released as one of two albums on one CD by Beat Goes On on February 14, 2001, paired with Vee's 1966 album, Look at Me Girl.

== Reception ==
Professional ratings
Review scores
Source	Rating
AllMusic	4/5 stars
The Encyclopedia of Popular Music	2/5 stars

=== Contemporary reviews ===
The album received a positive critical reception upon its release. Billboard noted that Vee "presents a new up-to-date sound that should easily win acceptance with such top numbers as 'Before You Go', 'You're a Big Girl Now', and 'Double Good Feeling'." Cashbox described the album as "a fine showcase for the versatile talent of the artist." The Dayton Daily News said that Vee "soft-pedals some good contemporary music", adding, "Though he's backed by the Strangers, the LP belongs to him."

=== Retrospectives ===
Bruce Eder of AllMusic said that the album showed "instead of sounding like a Buddy Holly wannabe gone to seed, he['s] doing music that could just as easily have come from, say, the Classics IV or the Monkees, or any other contemporary rock act out of 1966–1967. The transition is nearly as jarring as that of Johnny Rivers from rock & roller to folk-rocker to contemporary songwriter, and fascinating as well as great listening." On the other hand, The Encyclopedia of Popular Music gave the album a two-star rating only, meaning that they believed that album was "flawed or lacking in some way."

== Track listing ==
Side one
No.	Title	Writer(s)	Length
1.	"Come Back When You Grow Up"	Martha Sharpe	2:15
2.	"A Rose Grew In The Ashes"	Ronnie Dante, Gene Allen	2:42
3.	"You're A Big Girl Now"	Robert Thomas Velline	2:17
4.	"You Can Count On Me"	Mose Allison	2:47
5.	"Get The Message"	Jimmy Griffin, Michael C. Gordon	2:35
6.	"Hold On To Him"	Roy Cordell, Sal Trimachi	2:07

Side two
No.	Title	Writer(s)	Length
1.	"World Down on Your Knees"	Roy Cordell	2:21
2.	"Objects Of Gold"	Gene Allen	2:29
3.	"Before You Go"	Arthur Crudup, Russell Garrett Tillison	2:14
4.	"Mission Accomplished"	Rose Marie Cason, Betty W. Russell	2:44
5.	"I May Be Gone"	Robert Thomas Velline	2:09
6.	"Double Good Feeling"	Garry Bonner, Alan Gordon	2:16

== Charts ==
Chart performance for Come Back When You Grow Up
Chart (1967)	Peak position
US Billboard Top LPs	66
US Cashbox Top 100 Albums	37

Singles

Single	Year	Chart	Peak position
"Come Back When You Grow Up"	1967	US Billboard Hot 100	3
"Come Back When You Grow Up"	1967	US Cashbox Top 100	3
"Come Back When You Grow Up"	1967	Canada RPM Top 100 Singles	2
