= Bobby Vee (album) =

Studio album by Bobby Vee
- Released: January 1961
- Genre: Rock and roll
- Length: 25:57
- Label: Liberty
- Producer: Snuff Garrett

Bobby Vee chronology
Bobby Vee Sings Your Favorites (1960)	Bobby Vee (1961)	Bobby Vee with Strings and Things (1961)

Singles from Bobby Vee
- 1. "One Last Kiss" Released: April 11, 1960; 2. "Rubber Ball" Released: November 7, 1960; 3. "Stayin' In" Released: January 10, 1961

Bobby Vee is the second album by Bobby Vee and was released in 1961 by Liberty Records.

It contains a mix of contemporary covers, such as "Mr. Sandman" and "Poetry in Motion", with original hits. "Rubber Ball", "Stayin' In", and a cover of the Crickets' "More Than I Can Say" peaked at numbers 6, 33, and 61 respectively, on the Billboard Hot 100 singles chart in the United States, with "Rubber Ball" and "More Than I Can Say" also peaking at number 4 in the United Kingdom.

The album debuted on the Billboard Top LPs chart in the issue dated March 20, 1961, remaining on the album chart for 15 weeks and peaking at No. 18, the highest position Vee achieved on the chart. It debuted on the Cashbox albums chart in the issue dated February 25, 1961, and remained on the chart for five weeks, peaking at number 46.

The album was released on compact disc by Beat Goes On in 1999 as tracks 13 through 24 on a pairing of two albums on one CD with tracks 1 through 12 consisting of Vee's debut studio album from May 1960, Bobby Vee Sings Your Favorites.

Reel To Reel labels included this CD in a box set entitled Eight Classic Albums Plus Bonus Singles and was released on October 4, 2019.

== Reception ==
Professional ratings
Review scores
Source	Rating
AllMusic	3.5/5 stars
The Encyclopedia of Popular Music	3/5 stars

Joe Viglione of AllMusic said that "the hits have a timeless charm that puts them in a class above much of the close-to filler material here -- covers of Johnny Tillotson's "Poetry in Motion," the Chordettes/the Four Aces '50s hit "Mr. Sandman," the Fireballs/the Crickets "More Than I Can Say" (an eventual hit for Leo Sayer), and Little Willie John's "Talk to Me, Talk to Me". Of course with the hit songs to carry it, the "teen idol" look of the album and familiar material from other sources made for good marketing."

Billboard in its Spotlight of the Week album reviews stated that "two big hits are featured... along with "Mister Sandman", "Long Lonely Nights."

Cashbox mentioned that album "has the teeners solidly in mind."

== Track listing ==
=== Side A ===
1. "Rubber Ball" (A. Orlowski, Aaron Schroeder)
2. "Talk to Me, Talk to Me" (Joe Seneca)
3. "One Last Kiss" (Charles Strouse, Lee Adams)
4. "Angels in the Sky" (Dick Glasser)
5. "Stayin' In" (John D. Loudermilk)
6. "Long Lonely Nights" (Lee Andrews)

=== Side B ===
1. "Devil or Angel" (Blanche Carter)
2. "Poetry in Motion" (Mike Anthony, Paul Kaufman)
3. "More Than I Can Say" (Jerry Allison, Sonny Curtis)
4. "Mister Sandman" (Pat Ballard)
5. "Foolish Tears" (Ann Hall, Bob Glasser, Dick Glasser)
6. "Love, Love, Love" (Sid Wyche, Sunny David, Teddy McRae)

== Chart positions ==
Chart performance for Bobby Vee
Chart (1961)	Peak position
US Billboard Best-Selling Monophonic LP's	18
US Cashbox Best-Selling Monaural Albums	46

Singles

Single	Year	Chart	Peak position
"One Last Kiss"	1960	Billboard Hot 100	112
"One Last Kiss"	1960	Cashbox	91
"Rubber Ball"	1960	Billboard Hot 100	6
"Rubber Ball"	1960	UK Singles Chart	4
"Rubber Ball"	1960	Cashbox	6
"Stayin' In"	1961	Billboard Hot 100	33
"Stayin' In"	1961	Cashbox	32
"More Than I Can Say"	1961	Billboard Hot 100	61
"More Than I Can Say"	1961	UK Singles Chart	4
"More Than I Can Say"	1961	Cashbox	48
