= Bobby Vee Sings Hits of the Rockin' 50's =

Studio album by Bobby Vee
- Released: October 1961
- Genre: Rock and roll
- Length: 28:17
- Label: Liberty
- Producer: Snuff Garrett

Bobby Vee chronology
Bobby Vee with Strings and Things (1961)	Bobby Vee Sings Hits of the Rockin' 50's (1961)	Take Good Care of My Baby (1962)

Bobby Vee Sings Hits of the Rockin' 50's is the fourth studio album by American singer Bobby Vee and released in October 1961 by Liberty Records. Vee covered hits from the 1950s with this album including "Summertime Blues", "School Days", "Do You Want to Dance", "Lollipop", and "16 Candles".

The album debuted on the Billboard Top LPs chart in the issue dated October 30, 1961, remaining on the album chart for eight weeks, peaking at No. 85. It debuted in the UK shortly thereafter, on March 31, 1962 and spent its only week on the album chart there at number 20.

The album was released on compact disc by Beat Goes On on March 10, 1999 as tracks 13 through 24 on a pairing of two albums on one CD with tracks 1 through 12 consisting of Vee's 1961 album, Bobby Vee with Strings and Things.

Reel To Reel labels included this CD in a box set entitled Eight Classic Albums Plus Bonus Singles and was released on October 4, 2019.

== Reception ==
Professional ratings
Review scores
Source	Rating
AllMusic	2/5 stars
The Encyclopedia of Popular Music	3/5 stars
Billboard	4/5 stars
Disc	2/5 stars

At the time of the album's release, and giving it four stars to indicate "strong sales potential", Billboard noted Vee "selected a flock of the biggest hits of the past decade and does them in his pleasant style", while Cash Box thought "Youngsters will appreciate [Vee's] strict adherence to the original sounds" of past rock and roll hits.

Retrospectively, Bruce Eder of AllMusic believes that "the album wears thin after a few spins" and "even though Vee's performances are good, the album is too calculated and workmanlike to transcend its humble origins."

== Track listing ==
=== Side one ===
No.	Title	Writer(s)	Length
1.	"Do You Want to Dance"	Bobby Freeman	2:39
2.	"Lollipop"	Beverly Ross, Julius Dixson	1:54
3.	"School Days"	Chuck Berry	2:27
4.	"Little Star"	Vito Picone, Arthur Venosa	2:34
5.	"Come Go with Me"	Clarence Quick	1:56
6.	"Summertime Blues"	Eddie Cochran, Jerry Capehart	2:05

=== Side two ===
No.	Title	Writer(s)	Length
1.	"Happy, Happy Birthday Baby"	Margo Sylvia, Gilbert Lopez	2:20
2.	"Lavender's Blue"	Traditional	2:19
3.	"Donna"	Ritchie Valens	2:32
4.	"Earth Angel"	Curtis Williams, Jesse Belvin, Gaynel Hodge	2:45
5.	"The Wisdom of a Fool"	Roy Alfred, Abner Silver	2:03
6.	"16 Candles"	Luther Dixon, Allyson R. Khent	2:50

== Charts ==
Chart (1961)	Peak position
US Billboard Top LPs	85
UK Record Retailer Top Albums	20
