= Bobby Vee Sings Your Favorites =

Studio album by Bobby Vee
- Released: September 1960
- Genre: Rock and roll
- Length: 30:25
- Label: Liberty
- Producer: Snuff Garrett

Bobby Vee chronology
| Bobby Vee Sings Your Favorites (1960) | Bobby Vee (1961) |

Singles from Bobby Vee Sings Your Favorites
- 1. "Devil or Angel" Released: June 21, 1960

Bobby Vee Sings Your Favorites is the debut album by American singer Bobby Vee, released in September 1960 by Liberty Records. It features his first big hit "Devil or Angel", and a mirror hit "Since I Met You Baby". They peaked at Nos. 6 and 81, respectively, on the Billboard Hot 100 singles chart in the United States.

It contains a dozen ballads, consisting of old standards and newer love songs and providing a good look at popular ballads during that period.

The album was released on compact disc by Beat Goes On in 1999 as tracks 1 through 12 on a pairing of two albums on one CD with tracks 12 through 24 consisting of Vee's 1961 album, Bobby Vee. Reel To Reel labels included this CD in a box set entitled Eight Classic Albums Plus Bonus Singles and was released on October 4, 2019.

== Critical reception ==
Professional ratings
Review scores
| Source | Rating |
|---|---|
| The Encyclopedia of Popular Music | 2/5 stars |
| Billboard | 4/5 stars |
| Disc | 3/5 stars |

At the time of the album's release, and giving it four stars to indicate "very strong sales potential", Billboard states that Vee "has a good, sincere ballad style and he shows it off in good form here." Cashbox notes that the songs Vee "performs here in his initial LP are the proven hits from the recent past" and his "vocal stylings are replicas of the tunes' original hit sounds".

The Valley Times believes Vee has "an oscillating voice which grows upon the listener." While the Valley News wrote, "These might not be your all-time favorites, but teen listeners ought to enjoy [Vee's vocal] stylings".

Ken Graham of Disc magazine says the album is "not a great showing by any means, but a three-star award for its potential."

== Track listing ==
=== Side one ===
| No. | Title | Writer(s) | Length |
|---|---|---|---|
| 1. | "Devil or Angel" | Blanche Carter | 2:17 |
| 2. | "Mr. Blue" | Dewayne Blackwell | 2:29 |
| 3. | "Just a Dream" | Jimmy Clanton, Cosimo Matassa | 2:47 |
| 4. | "Since I Met You Baby" | Ivory Joe Hunter | 2:42 |
| 5. | "It's All in the Game" | Charles G. Dawes | 2:42 |
| 6. | "You Send Me" | Sam Cooke | 2:41 |

=== Side two ===
| No. | Title | Writer(s) | Length |
|---|---|---|---|
| 1. | "Young Love" | Ric Cartey, Carole Joyner | 2:47 |
| 2. | "My Prayer" | Georges Boulanger, Carlos Gomez Barrera, Jimmy Kennedy | 2:47 |
| 3. | "Sincerely" | Harvey Fuqua, Alan Freed | 2:39 |
| 4. | "Gone" | Smokey Rogers | 2:06 |
| 5. | "I'm Sorry" | Dub Allbritten, Ronnie Self | 2:26 |
| 6. | "Everyday" | Buddy Holly, Norman Petty | 2:07 |

== Charts ==
=== Singles ===
| Single | Year | Chart | Peak positions |
|---|---|---|---|
| "Devil or Angel" | 1960 | US Billboard Hot 100 | 6 |
| "Devil or Angel" | 1960 | US Cashbox | 4 |
| "Devil or Angel" | 1960 | US Billboard R&B | 22 |
| "Devil or Angel" | 1960 | Canada CHUM | 2 |
| "Since I Met You Baby" | 1960 | US Billboard Hot 100 | 81 |
