= 30 Big Hits of the 60's, Volume 2 =

Studio album by Bobby Vee
- Released: April 1966
- Genre: Pop
- Length: 49:32
- Label: Liberty
- Producer: Snuff Garrett

Bobby Vee chronology
Live! On Tour (1965)	30 Big Hits of the 60's, Volume 2 (1966)	Look at Me Girl (1966)

30 Big Hits of the 60's, Volume 2 is the fourteenth studio album by American singer Bobby Vee, and was released in April 1966 by Liberty Records.

Vee again covers hits from the 1960s with this album, including "(The Man Who Shot) Liberty Valance", "For Your Love", "Houston", "You're Sixteen", and "Call Me Irresponsible". Like 1964's Vol. 1, these are snippets of past hits from the era, with each song a medley combining two songs into one.

Although Volume 1 made it to the Cashbox albums chart in 1964, where it peaked at No. 95, Volume 2 failed to reach the charts.

== Reception ==
At the time of the album's release, Billboard praised Bobby Vee for "presenting and he does it in golden voice."

St. Petersburg Times raves "you'll enjoy the way he sings number.

Robert Reynolds called it a "Nice Album" and praised that "It showcases [Vee's] ability to sing almost any style of song."

The Post-Crescent mentions that Vee "takes on an enormous task and both singer and songs come through unscathed"

== Track listing ==
=== Side one ===
No.	Title	Writer(s)	Length
1.	"Medley: A Hundred Pounds of Clay - Elusive Butterfly"	Kay Rogers, Luther Dixon, Bob Elgin. Bob Lind	3:45
2.	"Medley: A Taste of Honey "(From The Broadway Musical: A Taste of Honey)" - Wives and Lovers"	Bobby Scott, Ric Marlow, Burt Bacharach, Hal David	3:48
3.	"Medley: These Boots Are Made for Walkin' - Sha La La"	Lee Hazlewood, Robert Mosley, Robert Taylor	3:40
4.	"Medley: Tower of Strength - (The Man Who Shot) Liberty Valance "(From The Paramount Pictures: The Man Who Shot Liberty Valance)"	Burt Bacharach, Bob Hilliard, Hal David	3:15
5.	"Medley: Baby I'm Yours - Make It Easy on Yourself"	Van McCoy, Burt Bacharach, Hal David	3:29
6.	"Medley: When You Walk in the Room - The 'In' Crowd"	Jackie DeShannon, Billy Page	3:30
7.	"Medley: Pony Time - You Can Have Her"	Don Covay, John Berry, Bill Cook	4:13

=== Side two ===
No.	Title	Writer(s)	Length
1.	"Medley: "Lies" - "Count Me In"	Beau Charles, Buddy Randell, Glen Hardin	3:08
2.	"Medley: "Love Is All We Need" - "Call Me Irresponsible" (From The Paramount Pictures: Papa's Delicate Condition)"	Tommy Edwards, Cynthia Weil, Jimmy Van Heusen, Sammy Cahn	2:42
3.	"Medley: "Bad to Me" - "I'm a Fool"	John Lennon, Paul McCartney, Joey Cooper, Red West	3:07
4.	"Medley: "Save Your Heart for Me" - "In the Misty Moonlight"	Gary Geld, Peter Udell, Cindy Walker	3:00
5.	"Medley: "The Story of My Life" - "Travelin' Man"	Burt Bacharach, Hal David, Jerry Fuller	2:50
6.	"Medley: "Mr. Blue" - "Come and Stay with Me"	Dewayne Blackwell, Jackie DeShannon	3:08
7.	"Medley: "Sandy" - "For Your Love"	Terry Fell, Graham Gouldman	2:52
8.	"Medley: "Houston" - "You're Sixteen"	Lee Hazlewood - Robert B. Sherman, Richard M. Sherman	2:52
