= 30 Big Hits of the 60's =

Studio album by Bobby Vee
- Released: August 1964
- Genre: Pop
- Length: 38:48
- Label: Liberty
- Producer: Snuff Garrett

Bobby Vee chronology
The New Sound from England! (1964)	30 Big Hits of the 60's (1964)	Live on Tour (1965)

Professional ratings
Review scores
Source	Rating
The Encyclopedia of Popular Music	3/5 stars

30 Big Hits of the 60's is a studio album by American singer Bobby Vee, and was released in August 1964 by Liberty Records.

It contains hits from the 1960s by other artist with this album, among the 30 tracks with combined with 5 songs are several, Beatles, Searchers and Frank Ifield song, and it including "Moon River", "P.S. I Love You", "My Dad", Memphis", "I Remember You", "Needles and Pins", "Sukiyaki" and others.

The album debuted on the Cashbox albums chart in the issue dated October 31, 1964, and remained on the chart for two weeks, peaking at number 95.

== Reception ==
At the time of the album's release, Billboard mentions "his appeal, coupled with that of the tunes."

Cashbox called it "One of the best albums" and stated that "a medley of thirty familiar recent vintage chart-riders. He really shines as he dishes-up the likes of 'A Fool Never Learns,' 'Love Me Do,' 'I Remember You.'"

Variety notes "He delivers them all with spirit and finesse and since the songs are all set in their original arrangements."

Press & Sun-Bulletin notes "it can find many favorites in it."

Tampa Bay Times says Vee will "delight his fans with brief versions or numbers like 'Moon River,' 'Danke Schoen,' 'Ruby Baby.'"

== Track listing ==
=== Side one ===
No.	Title	Writer(s)	Length
1.	"Medley: A Fool Never Learns, Do You Want to Know a Secret, Goodbye Cruel World, Blame It on the Bossa Nova, Dawn"	Sonny Curtis, John Lennon, Paul McCartney, Gloria Shayne Baker, Barry Mann, Cynthia Weil, Bob Gaudio, Sandy Linzer	6:15
2.	"Medley: Memphis, Love Me Do, Twist and Shout, Hey! Baby, P.S. I Love You"	Chuck Berry, John Lennon, Paul McCartney, Phil Medley, Bert Berns, Margaret Cobb, Bruce Channel	4:55
3.	"Medley: Can't Get Used to Losing You, Spanish Harlem, Hey Girl, Blue on Blue, Everybody's Somebody's Fool"	Doc Pomus, Mort Shuman, Jerry Leiber, Mike Stoller, Gerry Goffin, Carole King, Burt Bacharach, Hal David, Howard Greenfield Jack Keller,	7:45

=== Side two ===
No.	Title	Writer(s)	Length
1.	"Medley: I Remember You", "Venus in Blue Jeans", "Save the Last Dance for Me", "Happy Birthday Sweet Sixteen, "Danke Schoen"	Johnny Mercer, Victor Schertzinger, Carole King, Howard Greenfield Jack Keller, Doc Pomus, Mort Shuman, Neil Sedaka, Bert Kaempfert, Kurt Schwabach, Milt Gabler	5:44
2.	"Medley: Breaking Up Is Hard to Do, Please Help Me, I'm Falling, Nadine, Ruby Baby, Needles and Pins"	Neil Sedaka, Howard Greenfield, Don Robertson. Hal Blair, Chuck Berry, Jerry Leiber, Mike Stoller, Jack Nitzsche, Sonny Bono	5:53
3.	"Medley: Moon River "(From The Paramount Pictures: Breakfast at Tiffany's)", "Crying in the Rain", "My First Lonely Night", "Sealed with a Kiss, "My Dad"	Henry Mancini, Johnny Mercer, Carole King, Howard Greenfield Buzz Cason, Hachidai Nakamura, Thomas Lesslie, Peter Udell, Gary Geld. Barry Mann, Cynthia Weil	7:20

== Charts ==
Chart (1964)	Peak position
US Cashbox Top 100 Monaural Albums	95
