= Look at Me Girl =

Studio album by Bobby Vee and the Strangers
- Released: October 1966
- Genre: Pop
- Length: 29:52
- Label: Liberty
- Producer: Snuff Garrett

Bobby Vee and the Strangers chronology
30 Big Hits of the 60's, Volume 2 (1966)	Look at Me Girl (1966)	Bobby Vee's Golden Greats Vol. 2 (1966)

Singles from Look at Me Girl
- 1. "Look at Me Girl" Released: May 27, 1966

Look at Me Girl is the fifteenth studio album by the American singer Bobby Vee, and was released in October 1966 by Liberty Records. The album featured the debut of Vee's backup band, The Strangers. The only single from the album was "Look at Me Girl". The album contains original songs as well as the covers such as "Sunny", "Sweet Pea" and "Turn-Down Day".

The album's title track, made its debut on the Billboard Hot 100 chart on July 8, 1966, eventually spending one week at number 52 during its 8-week stay, and number 67 on the Cashbox singles chart. The single was Vee's best showing since "I'll Make You Mine" in 1964, which also reached number 52 on the Billboard Hot 100. The album debuted on the Cash Box Looking Ahead albums chart in the issue dated October 22, 1966, and remained on the chart for two weeks, peaking at number 102.

The album was released on compact disc by Beat Goes On on February 14, 2001, as tracks 1 through 12 on a pairing of two albums on one CD with tracks 13 through 24 consisting of Vee's 1967 album, Come Back When You Grow Up.

== Reception ==
Professional ratings
Review scores
Source	Rating
AllMusic	4/5 stars
Record Mirror	3/5 stars
The Encyclopedia of Popular Music	3/5 stars

Bruce Eder of AllMusic said that the album "showed [Vee] belatedly abandoning his early-'60s teen pop sound and suddenly working within what sounded like a group context, with guitar-bass-drums accompaniment and doing songs that not only had a beat but also a modern edge, including "Sunny," "Summer in the City," "Look at Me Girl," with just a couple of songs that recalled his earlier work," giving it a four-star rating.

Billboard mentioned that Vee's "old familiar style" became more distinct as the album progressed.

Cashbox gave a positive review, saying that Vee "goes off into such different sounds as "Lil' Red Riding Hood", "Sweet Pea", and "Sunny" for a host of easily recognizable sounds rendered with smooth individuality."

Disc and Music Echo admired the "Fresh treatments of some fresh material."

The Ottawa Journal praised The Strangers along with Vee's singing, mentioning that Vee had not "lost his vocal punch".

Record Mirror stated that there was little to recommend from the album apart from Vee's "ever pleasant inoffensive voice", giving it three-star rating, It received the same rating from The Encyclopedia of Popular Music,

== Track listing ==
Side one
No.	Title	Writer(s)	Length
1.	"Look At Me Girl"	James Lewis Williams	2:28
2.	"Sunny"	Bobby Hebb	2:45
3.	"Growing Pains"	Bob Stone	2:39
4.	"Like You've Never Known Before"	Robert Thomas Velline	2:00
5.	"Summer in the City"	John Sebastian, Mark Sebastian, Steve Boone	2:38
6.	"Turn-Down Day"	Jerry Keller, David Blume	2:25

Side two
No.	Title	Writer(s)	Length
1.	"Fly Away"	Al Kooper	2:55
2.	"Sweet Pea"	Tommy Roe	2:15
3.	"That's All In The Past"	Robert Thomas Velline	1:43
4.	"He's Not Your Friend"	Allen Reynolds, Dickey Lee	2:32
5.	"Back In Town"	Robert Thomas Velline	2:20
6.	"Li'l Red Riding Hood"	Ron Blackwell	2:30

== Charts ==
=== Singles ===
Single	Year	Chart	Peak position
"Look at Me Girl"	1966	US Billboard Hot 100	52
"Look at Me Girl"	1966	US Cashbox Top 100 Singles	67
