= Wish You Were Mine (disambiguation) =

"Wish You Were Mine" is a 2014 song by Philip George.

Wish You Were Mine may also refer to:

== Films ==
- Kash Aap Hamare Hote (Translation: Wish... You Were Mine) is a 2003 Bollywood musical film

== Music ==
- "Wish You Were Mine", song by Sugar Pie DeSanto Trudy Rhone 1960
- "Wish You Were Mine", song by The-Dream from Terius Nash: 1977 2012
- "Wish You Were Mine", song by Robin Trower from What Lies Beneath (Robin Trower album) 2009
- "Wish You Were Mine", song by John Mayall from Blues from Laurel Canyon 1968
- "Wish You Were Mine", song by Gregory Isaacs Private Beach Party 1985
- "Wish You Were Mine", song by Bobby Vee, B-side to "Hickory, Dick And Doc" Bobby Vee discography 1964
- "Wish That You Were Mine", song by Stephanie Mills from Sweet Sensation 1980
