= Just Today =

Studio album by Bobby Vee
- Released: April 1968
- Genre: Pop
- Length: 25:58
- Label: Liberty
- Producer: Dallas Smith

Bobby Vee chronology
Come Back When You Grow Up (1967)	Just Today (1968)	Do What You Gotta Do (1968)

Singles from Just Today
- 1. "Beautiful People" Released: October 21, 1967; 2. "Maybe Just Today" Released: January 18, 1968; 3. "Medley: My Girl/Hey Girl" Released: March 26, 1968

Just Today is the seventeenth studio album by American singer Bobby Vee and released in April 1968 by Liberty Records. Dallas Smith arranged and produced the album.

According to Robert Reynolds, in The Music of Bobby Vee, the executives at Liberty Records believed they were on to something with Bobby's rhythm and blues hit medley and several Motown flavored tunes were recorded. However instead of releasing an entire R&B album, they put out a disjointed mix of similar Motown-like recordings and the rest more in line.

The album debuted on the Billboard Top LPs chart on April 28, 1968, remaining on the album chart for seven weeks and peaking at No. 187. It was Vee's last album to make it onto the Billboard charts.

The album was released on compact disc by Beat Goes On on February 14, 2001, as tracks 1 through 11 on a pairing of two albums on one CD with tracks 12 through 22 consisting of Vee's 1968 album, Do What You Gotta Do.

== Singles ==
The first single from the album, "Beautiful People", made its debut on the Billboard Hot 100 chart on November 18, 1967, spending three weeks at No. 37 during its seven-week stay. It managed to reach No. 27 on the Cashbox singles chart. The second single, "Maybe Just Today", debuted on the Billboard Hot 100 chart on February 10, 1968, spending one week at number forty-six during its six-week stay, and peaked No. 38 on the Cash Box singles chart. The third single, "Medley: My Girl/Hey Girl" made its debut on the Billboard Hot 100 chart on April 20, 1968, spending one week at No. 35 during its nine-week stay, while climbing to No. 17 on the Cash Box singles chart. The latter medley marked his last of fourteen appearances in the US top-forty singles on the Billboard charts, the first being "Devil or Angel" in 1960.

== Reception ==
Professional ratings
Review scores
Source	Rating
AllMusic	3.5/5 stars
Record Mirror	3/5 stars
The Encyclopedia of Popular Music	2/5 stars

Bruce Eder of AllMusic said that the album "showed [Vee's] sincere cover of "Sealed with a Kiss," which is his look back on his own early-'60s past. "Beautiful People" is an upbeat piece of late-'60s pop/rock with a catchy melody, and "Maybe Just Today" and "Sunrise Highway" are nicely contemporary (yet gently nostalgic) pieces by an artist a decade out of his era and still competing for a softer listenership".

Billboard called it "His tribute to durability", and stated that "[Vee] has a disciplined style and incorporates the best features of the rock and standards singer."

Record Mirror wrote that "Bobby retains his some what courteous charm and knack of dealing with a tuneful song in straight forward and ungimmicky style".

Variety described the album as "a swinging set of contemporary rockers."

Meriden Journal called it "a good listening in the pop music vein. and stated that "he sings well, read lyrics well, is very good looking, and a pleasant performer".

The Surrey Mirror and County Post stated that "it follows recent visit to this country and his voice is improving all the time and his relaxed vocal style comes over well".

== Track listing ==
Side one
No.	Title	Writer(s)	Length
1.	"Maybe Just Today"	Martha Sharpe	2:08
2.	"Get Ready"	Smokey Robinson	2:35
3.	"Medley: My Girl/Hey Girl"	Smokey Robinson, Ronald White, Carole King, Gerry Goffin	2:32
4.	"Sunrise Highway"	Bobby Bloom, John Linde, Pete Andreoli, Vini Poncia	2:27
5.	"Just Keep It Up (And See What Happens)"	Otis Blackwell	2:07

Side two
No.	Title	Writer(s)	Length
1.	"The Girl I Left Behind"	Carole Bayer, Neil Sedaka	2:42
2.	"The Way You Do the Things You Do"	Smokey Robinson, Robert Rogers	2:20
3.	"Nobody's Home To Go Home To"	Carole Bayer, Toni Wine	2:24
4.	"Sealed with a Kiss"	Peter Udell, Gary Geld	2:02
5.	"Tiffany Rings"	Alan Gordon, Garry Bonner	2:15
6.	"Beautiful People"	Kenny Gist Jr.	2:08

== Charts ==
Chart performance for Just Today
Chart (1964)	Peak position
US Billboard Top LPs	187

Singles

Single	Year	Chart	Peak position
"Beautiful People"	1967	US Billboard Hot 100	37
"Beautiful People"	1967	US Cashbox Top 100	27
"Beautiful People"	1967	Canada RPM Top 100 Singles	19
"Maybe Just Today"	1968	US Billboard Hot 100	46
"Maybe Just Today"	1968	US Cashbox Top 100	38
"Maybe Just Today"	1968	RPM Top 100 Singles	35
"Medley: My Girl/Hey Girl"	1968	US Billboard Hot 100	35
"Medley: My Girl/Hey Girl"	1968	US Cashbox Top 100	17
"Medley: My Girl/Hey Girl"	1968	RPM Top 100 Singles	7
