= Bobby Vee Meets the Ventures =

1963 studio album

Studio album by Bobby Vee and the Ventures
- Released: June 1, 1963
- Genre: Rock and roll
- Length: 29:32
- Label: Liberty (LRP 3289/LST 7289)
- Producer: Snuff Garrett

The Ventures chronology
Surfing (1963)	Bobby Vee Meets the Ventures (1963)	The Ventures Play the Country Classics (1963)

Bobby Vee chronology
Just for Fun (1963)	Bobby Vee Meets the Ventures (1963)	I Remember Buddy Holly (1963)

Professional ratings
Review scores
Source	Rating
AllMusic	4/5 stars
Disc	3/5 stars
The Encyclopedia of Popular Music	3/5 stars

Bobby Vee Meets the Ventures is a 1963 cross-over rock and roll album that brings Bobby Vee, a singer, together with the Ventures, an instrumental quartet. Two tracks are instrumentals performed by the Ventures alone. Bobby Vee Meets the Ventures was promoted by touring along with the 1962 album Bobby Vee Meets the Crickets.

The album debuted on the Billboard Top LPs chart on June 1, 1963, and remained on the chart for eight weeks, peaking at number 91. On the Cashbox Top 100 Monaural Albums chart, it reached number 37 in a 12-week run.

The album was released on compact disc by Beat Goes On on September 16, 1998, as tracks 13 through 24 on a pairing of two albums on one CD with tracks 1 through 12 consisting of Vee's 9th studio album from February 1963, The Night Has a Thousand Eyes. It was also released as one of two albums on one CD by Collectables Records on October 17, 2000, paired with Vee's 1967 album Come Back When You Grow Up.

== Reception ==
Bruce Eder of AllMusic called it Bobby Vee's "hardest-rocking album ever", and stated that the album is "one great showcase for Vee's vocalizing and the playing of Nokie Edwards et al". Billboard called it "one of the hottest in the teen album dance field".

The album was referred to as a "Rocking Cha Cha Beat" by Disc, and Cashbox said "the distinctive vocal delivery blends smoothly with the instrumental stylings of the Ventures".

The Liverpool Echo wrote that "Vee seems to have lost a little of his early vocal potency and the Ventures tend to bang and bash too heavily for comfort".

== Track listing ==
=== Side one ===
No.	Title	Writer(s)	Performer(s)	Length
1.	"Goodnight, Irene"	Lead Belly	Bobby Vee and the Ventures	2:14
2.	"Walk Right Back"	Sonny Curtis	Bobby Vee and the Ventures	2:51
3.	"Linda Lu"	Ray Sharpe	Bobby Vee and the Ventures	2:42
4.	"Caravan"	Juan Tizol; Duke Ellington; Irving Mills	The Ventures	2:47
5.	"What Else Is New"	Robert Thomas Velline	Bobby Vee and the Ventures	2:21
6.	"Candy Man"	Beverly Ross; Fred Neil	Bobby Vee and the Ventures	3:32

=== Side two ===
No.	Title	Writer(s)	Performer(s)	Length
1.	"This Is Where Friendship Ends"	Thomas Lesslie Garrett; Robert Thomas Velline	Bobby Vee and the Ventures	1:50
2.	"Honeycomb"	Bob Merrill	Bobby Vee and the Ventures	2:21
3.	"Pretty Girls Everywhere"	Eugene Church; Thomas Williams	Bobby Vee and the Ventures	2:05
4.	"Wild Night"	Don Wilson; Mel Taylor; Nokie Edwards; Bob Bogle	The Ventures	2:16
5.	"I'm Gonna Sit Right Down and Write Myself a Letter"	Fred E. Ahlert; Joe Young	Bobby Vee and the Ventures	2:14
6.	"If I'm Right or Wrong"	Jackie DeShannon; Sharon Sheeley	Bobby Vee and the Ventures	2:23

== Charts ==
Chart (1963)	Peak position
US Top LPs (Billboard)	91
US Cashbox Top 100 Monaural Albums	37
