= The New Sound from England! =

The New Sound From England!

Studio album by Bobby Vee
- Released: April 1964
- Genre: Pop
- Length: 27:52
- Label: Liberty
- Producer: Snuff Garrett

Bobby Vee chronology
I Remember Buddy Holly (1963)	The New Sound From England! (1964)	30 Big Hits of the 60's (1964)

Singles from The New Sound From England!
- 1. "I'll Make You Mine/She's Sorry" Released: February 7, 1964

The New Sound From England! is a studio album American singer Bobby Vee, and was released in April 1964 by Liberty Records. The album featured backing vocals by The Eligibles, a vocal quartet featuring Ron Hicklin and Al Capps. The only single from the album was "I'll Make You Mine".

The album contains original songs as well as The Beatles covers such as "From Me to You" and "She Loves You".

The album debuted on the Billboard Top LPs chart in the issue dated June 27, 1964, and remained on the album chart for two weeks, peaking at No. 146.

The album was released on compact disc by Beat Goes On on November 12, 2002, as tracks 1 through 12 on a pairing of two albums on one CD with tracks 13 through 24 consisting of being Vee's 1965 live album, Live on Tour.

== Singles ==
"I'll Make You Mine" debuted on the Billboard Hot 100 chart on February 22, 1964, spending one week at number 52 during its 8-week stay, and number 54 on the Cashbox singles chart. The single was Vee's last best showing until "Look at Me Girl" in 1966, which also reached number 52 on the Billboard Hot 100.

== Reception ==
Professional ratings
Review scores
Source	Rating
The Encyclopedia of Popular Music	2/5 stars

Billboard mentioned that "[Vee is] singing the Beatles Sound through some of this set."

Cashbox gave a positive review, saying that "Vee gets on the bandwagon to cash in on the click sound as he surveys a bag of rock tunes in the British manner", and calling it "a natural for top sales action".

The Progress-Index wrote that "it was assumed [British invasion artists were] the only ones who knew what this sound was about. In this album Bobby Vee proves otherwise."

The Evening Independent wrote that "Vee may turn back the British invasion with his potent performances". It was given a two-star rating by The Encyclopedia of Popular Music, meaning that they believed that it was "flawed or lacking in some way."

== Track listing ==
Side one
No.	Title	Writer(s)	Length
1.	"I'll Make You Mine"	Robert Thomas Velline	2:22
2.	"Don't You Believe Them"	Robert Thomas Velline	2:28
3.	"She Loves You"	John Lennon, Paul McCartney	2:22
4.	"I'll String Along With You"	Harry Warren, Al Dubin	2:23
5.	"Ginger"	Thomas Lesslie Garrett, Robert Thomas Velline	2:23
6.	"Any Other Girl"	Robert Thomas Velline	2:29

Side two
No.	Title	Writer(s)	Length
1.	"She's Sorry"	Robert Thomas Velline	2:02
2.	"Brown Eyed Handsome Man"	Chuck Berry	2:03
3.	"Suspicion"	Doc Pomus, Mort Shuman	2:45
4.	"From Me to You"	John Lennon, Paul McCartney	1:56
5.	"You Can't Lie to a Liar"	Paul Hampton, Cinthy Churchill	2:28
6.	"Take a Walk, Johnny"	Cliff Crofford	2:25

== Charts ==
Chart performance for The New Sound from England!
Chart (1964)	Peak position
US Billboard Top LPs	146

=== Singles ===
Single	Year	Chart	Peak position
"I'll Make You Mine"	1964	US Billboard Hot 100	52
"I'll Make You Mine"	1964	US Cashbox Top 100 Singles	57
