= Gates, Grills & Railings =

Studio album by Bobby Vee
- Released: March 1969
- Genre: Pop
- Length: 37:49
- Label: Liberty
- Producer: Dallas Smith

Bobby Vee chronology
Do What You Gotta Do (1968)	Gates, Grills & Railings (1969)	Nothin' Like a Sunny Day (1972)

Singles from Gates, Grills & Railings
- 1. "(I'm Into Lookin' For) Someone to Love Me" Released: November 1968

Gates, Grills & Railings is the nineteenth studio album by American singer Bobby Vee, released in March 1969 by Liberty Records. His final album for the label, it features one single, "(I'm Into Lookin' For) Someone to Love Me". Dallas Smith arranged and produced the album.

It features covers such as "One", "Younger Generation", and the early recording of "I Just Can't Help Believing" (which would become huge hits for B. J. Thomas and Elvis Presley in 1970). It also includes songs by John Sebastian, Harry Nilsson, David Gates, and Mark Marvin, along with a number of self-penned songs.

Vee also covers Cliff Richard's album track "London's Not Too Far"; Marvin was the lead guitarist of Richard's backing band the Shadows. The single, "(I'm Into Lookin' For) Someone to Love Me" made its debut on the Billboard Hot 100 chart on December 28, 1968, eventually spending one week at number 98 during its three-week stay, number 92 on the Cashbox singles chart, and number 84 in Canada. This marked Vee's last album to featured a charting single.

The album was released on compact disc by Beat Goes On on August 7, 2006 as tracks 1 through 12 on a pairing of two albums on one CD with tracks 13 through 23 consisting of Vee's 1972 album under His Birth Name Robert Thomas Velline, Nothin' Like a Sunny Day.

== Reception ==
Professional ratings
Review scores
Source	Rating
The Encyclopedia of Popular Music	2/5 stars

Billboard selected the album for a "Pop Special Merit" review, and stated that "an attractive foldout cover should help make it a commercial success."

Cashbox called it "a change of pace album", and stated that it "finds the usually teen-oriented songster performing in a slightly heavier vein."

Record World referred to as "soft, thoughtful album" and noted that "The recurring themes are love, loss of love, youth, change."

The Honolulu Advertiser believed that he "probes the richly sensuous songs of the times".

The Missoulian stated it that "has nothing to do with railroads. It used to be that singing groups copped crazy names but albums decided to move in on the action."

The Encyclopedia of Popular Music gave the album a two-star rating, meaning that they believed the album was "flawed or lacking".

== Track listing ==
Side one
No.	Title	Writer(s)	Length
1.	"She Doesn't Live Here Anymore"	Toni Wine, Carole Bayer	2:36
2.	"The Passing of a Friend"	David Gates	2:50
3.	"One"	Harry Nilsson	4:34
4.	"(I'm Into Lookin' For) Someone to Love Me"	Toni Wine, Carole Bayer	2:45
5.	"London's Not Too Far"	Hank B. Marvin	2:27
6.	"Younger Generation"	John Sebastian	3:40

Side two
No.	Title	Writer(s)	Length
1.	"I Just Can't Help Believing"	Barry Mann, Cynthia Weil	2:55
2.	"Jenny Came to Me"	Don Dunn, Tony Macaulay	3:26
3.	"Lavender Kite"	Graeme Krosberg, Raul Abeyta	2:46
4.	"The Beauty And The Sweet Talk"	Bob Stone	3:28
5.	"Santa Cruz"	Robert Taylor, Stan Spindler	3:15
6.	"Annie Joined The Band"	Robert Thomas Velline	3:07

== Charts ==
=== Singles ===
Single	Year	Chart	Peak position
"(I'm Into Lookin' For) Someone to Love Me"	1968	US Billboard Hot 100	98
"(I'm Into Lookin' For) Someone to Love Me"	1968	US Cashbox Top 100	92
"(I'm Into Lookin' For) Someone to Love Me"	1968	Canada Top 100 Singles (RPM)	84
