= Bobby Vee Meets the Crickets =

Studio album by Bobby Vee and the Crickets
- Released: July 14, 1962
- Recorded: September 12–13, 20, 28, and fall 1961
- Studio: United (Hollywood, California)
- Genre: Rock and roll
- Length: 27:54 (52:47, 1991 reissue)
- Label: Liberty
- Producer: Snuff Garrett

Bobby Vee and the Crickets chronology
In Style with the Crickets (1960)	Bobby Vee Meets the Crickets (1962)	Something Old, Something New, Something Blue, Somethin' Else (1962)

Bobby Vee chronology
A Bobby Vee Recording Session (1962)	Bobby Vee Meets the Crickets (1962)	Bobby Vee's Golden Greats (1962)

Singles from Bobby Vee Meets the Crickets
- 1. "Someday (When I'm Gone From You)" Released: August 10, 1962

Bobby Vee Meets the Crickets is a collaborative rock and roll album that brings singer Bobby Vee together with the Crickets. It was Vee's seventh album and The Crickets' second release following the departure and subsequent death of their front man, Buddy Holly. The album contains new versions of three songs written by or recorded by Holly—Peggy Sue, Bo Diddley, and Well...All Right—and a host of cover versions of 1950s rock'n'roll songs by artists like Little Richard and Chuck Berry.

Originally released as an LP record on July 14, 1962, the album debuted on the Billboard Top LPs chart in the issue dated July 21 of that year, remaining on the chart for 23 weeks and peaking at No. 42. It debuted on the Cashbox albums chart in the issue dated June 30, 1962, and remained on the chart for 12 weeks, peaking at No. 28. In the UK, it spent 27 weeks on the albums chart peaking at No. 2, Vee's highest position achieved on the chart there. Bobby Vee Meets the Crickets was promoted by touring along with the 1963 album, Bobby Vee Meets the Ventures.

The album was re-released on CD in 1991, with bonus tracks not featured on the original album. It received another re-release in 2000 when Collectables Records paired with Vee's 1963 album, The Night Has a Thousand Eyes on one disc. Reel To Reel labels included the album in a box set entitled Eight Classic Albums Plus Bonus Singles in 2019.

== Background ==
After Buddy Holly's departure, the Crickets recorded with Earl Sinks serving as lead vocalist, with Crickets Jerry Allison and Sonny Curtis also sharing vocals. David Box also recorded a single as lead vocalist in 1959. Several weeks after relocating to Los Angeles in 1960, guitarist and songwriter Sonny Curtis was drafted and began a two-year stint in the US Army. Curtis was stationed in Fort Ord and limited in his ability to continue working with the band. With Curtis away, Jerry Allison offered fellow Texan Jerry Naylor the position of lead singer with the group in 1961. He would remain through early 1965. Tommy Allsup, the guitarist who had toured with Holly during the fateful Winter Dance Party frequently played with the band.

Singing star and Liberty records artist Bobby Vee had a number of connections with Holly and the Crickets. After Buddy Holly, Ritchie Valens and The Big Bopper were killed in the tragic February 1959 plane crash, Fargo, North Dakota, teenager Bobby Vee was among several local young musicians recruited to join the rest of the Winter Dance Party tour, beginning with the next scheduled concert in Fargo. Vee had recorded a hit version of the Crickets' song "More Than I Can Say" in 1961.

== Reception ==
Professional ratings
Review scores
Source	Rating
AllMusic	3/5 stars
New Record Mirror	5/5 stars
The Encyclopedia of Popular Music	3/5 stars

Billboard described the album "as fine a set of rockabilly style vocals". Cashbox wrote, "The Crickets are a perfect backing for the songster's superior vocal charms". New Record Mirror claims "the album lives up to all expectations."

In a retrospective review, Stephen Thomas Erlewine of AllMusic called the album "enjoyable".

== 1991 reissue ==
The 1991 CD re-release includes outtakes from the Crickets' studio sessions with Bobby Vee recorded during September 1962 and a medley of Buddy Holly songs recorded by Vee and the Crickets on April 16, 1989, which was released as a single in 1990.

== Track listing ==
Side one
No.	Title	Writer(s)	Length
1.	"Peggy Sue"	J.I. Allison, Buddy Holly, Norman Petty	2:18
2.	"Bo Diddley"	Ellas McDaniel	2:15
3.	"Someday (When I'm Gone From You)"	Tom Lesslie (aka Snuff Garrett), Dick Glasser	2:10
4.	"Well...All Right"	J.I. Allison, Buddy Holly, Norman Petty, Joe B. Mauldin	2:16
5.	"I Gotta Know"	M. Williams, P. Evans	2:06
6.	"Lookin' for Love"	Roy Orbison, Joe Melson	1:57

Side two
No.	Title	Writer(s)	Length
7.	"Sweet Little Sixteen"	Chuck Berry	2:25
8.	"When You're in Love"	Allison, Sonny Curtis	1:53
9.	"Lucille"	Richard Penniman, Albert Collins	2:25
10.	"The Girl of My Best Friend"	Sam Bobrick, Beverly Ross	2:22
11.	"Little Queenie"	Chuck Berry	2:30
12.	"The Girl Can't Help It"	Bobby Troup	2:26

1991 CD bonus tracks
No.	Title	Writer(s)	Length
13.	"Lonely Weekend (Version 1, take 9A)"	Charlie Rich	2:13
14.	"It's Too Late (Version 1, take 14)"	Robert Velline	2:23
15.	"Come on Baby"	Buddy Knox	2:03
16.	"Mountain of Love"	Harold Dorman	2:27
17.	"No One Knows"	Ken Hecht, Ernie Maresca	2:45
18.	"Shanghaied"	Mel Tillis, Marijohn Wilkin	1:49
19.	"Keep A Knockin'"	Richard Penniman	2:22
20.	"Lonely Weekend" (Version 2)	Charlie Rich	2:32
21.	"It's Too Late" (Version 2)	Robert Velline	2:07
22.	"Buddy Holly Medley: What To Do / Crying, Waiting, Hoping / Learning the Game"	Buddy Holly	3:44

== Personnel ==
Partial credits from the following sources.

- Bobby Vee – vocals, guitar

The Crickets

- Jerry Allison – drums, backing vocals

NOTE: Though pictured on the front and back of the record jacket, neither Jerry Naylor and Joe B. Mauldin play on the record. Mauldin left the group until the middle 1970s, and Naylor had only joined in the time for the album's release, becoming the band's lead singer from 1961 to 1965.

Additional personnel

- Tommy Allsup – guitar
- Howard Roberts – piano (1, 2, 3, 17)
- Red Callender – bass
- Earl Palmer – drums
- Ernie Freeman – piano, arranger, conductor
- Gene Garf – piano
- Jim Economides – engineer
- Eddie Brackett – engineer
- Snuff Garrett – producer
