= Merry Christmas from Bobby Vee =

Studio album by Bobby Vee
- Released: December 1962
- Genres: Christmas, Rock and roll
- Length: 28:10
- Label: Liberty
- Producer: Snuff Garrett

Bobby Vee chronology
Bobby Vee's Golden Greats (1962)	Merry Christmas from Bobby Vee (1962)	The Night Has a Thousand Eyes (1963)

Merry Christmas from Bobby Vee is the eighth studio album American singer Bobby Vee, and was released in December 1962 by Liberty Records.

The first of 2 Christmas albums released by Vee's. releasing "A Not So Merry Christmas", as a seasonal single. also included in this album are "White Christmas", "Winter Wonderland", "I'll Be Home for Christmas", and other Christmas hits.

The album debuted on the Billboard Top LPs chart in the issue dated December 15, 1962, and remained on the chart for three weeks, peaking at No. 136.

Reel To Reel labels included this CD in a box set entitled Eight Classic Albums Plus Bonus Singles and was released on October 4, 2019.

== Reception ==
Professional ratings
Review scores
Source	Rating
AllMusic	3/5 stars
The Encyclopedia of Popular Music	2/5 stars

David A. Milberg of AllMusic stated that the album includes "Not just the standards, but some tasty originals like 'A Not-So-Merry Christmas'".

Billboard called it "a solid holiday album," and stated that "Bobby Vee comes through with strong performances here of a good collection of holiday sides."

Cash Box said that "Bobby Vee makes his contribution to the Christmas Season with this package of uptempo tunes with a Yuletide flavor, The Chanter makes a brief departure from the light-hearted mood."

The Pittsburgh Post-Gazette said the album provides "Popular holiday songs with the personal sentiment of Bobby Vee."

The Courier-Post praised "a pleasant collection of tunes ranging from the nostalgic "Christmas Wish" to the jolly "Jingle-Bell Rock." His refreshing interpretation of holiday standards like "Silver Bells" and "Winter Wonderland."

The Pittsburgh Press called it "a spirited album."

== Track listing ==
=== Side one ===
No.	Title	Writer(s)	Length
1.	"Jingle Bell Rock"	Joe Beal, Jim Boothe	2:14
2.	"My Christmas Love"	Ben Weisman, Bernie Wayne	2:04
3.	"White Christmas" (From Paramount Pictures: Holiday Inn)	Irving Berlin	1:54
4.	"Christmas Vacation"	L. S. Roberts	1:47
5.	"I'll Be Home for Christmas"	Walter Kent, Kim Gannon, Buck Ram	2:00
6.	"A Christmas Wish"	Glen Hardin, Sonny Curtis	2:30

=== Side two ===
No.	Title	Writer(s)	Length
1.	"A Not So Merry Christmas"	Dick Glasser, Ken Reese, Tom Lesslie	2:17
2.	"Silver Bells" (From Paramount Pictures: The Lemon Drop Kid)	Jay Livingston, Ray Evans	2:11
3.	"Winter Wonderland"	Felix Bernard, Richard Bernhard Smith	2:34
4.	"Blue Christmas"	Billy Hayes, Jay W. Johnson	2:10
5.	"Silent Night"	Eddie Brackett, Ernie Freeman	2:17
6.	"(There's No Place Like) Home For The Holidays"	Robert Allen, Al Stillman	2:08

== Charts ==
Chart (1962)	Peak position
US Billboard Top LPs	136
