= Pretend You Don't See Her (song) =

1957 single by Jerry Vale

Single by Jerry Vale

from the album Jerry Vale's Greatest Hits
- B-side: "The Spreading Chestnut"
- Released: September 1957
- Genre: Traditional pop
- Length: 2:39
- Label: Columbia; 4-41010
- Songwriter: Steve Allen

Jerry Vale singles chronology
"Love in the Afternoon" (1957)	"Pretend You Don't See Her" (1957)	"I Always Say" (1958)

"Pretend You Don't See Her" is a song written by media personality Steve Allen and most notably performed by Jerry Vale, who released it as a single under Columbia Records in late 1957, with a positive reception and a moderate chart presence. The song was included in Vale's compilation albums. Later in 1964, the song faced a minor revival via a Bobby Vee rendition.

== Jerry Vale version ==
=== Background and release ===
Jerry Vale was first noticed by Columbia Records' Guy Mitchell in the early 1950s, and from there on Vale started recording for the records company. He quickly had a few traditional pop hits, but by 1957, they were far in between. Following a string of commercially unsuccessful singles, Columbia scheduled to release "Pretend You Don't See Her" for September 1957. It was backed by a Christmas ballad, "The Spreading Chestnut" on the B-side, which was a non-album release. Percy Faith conducted and arranged the chorus and orchestra on both sides.

=== Critical reception ===
Professional ratings
Review scores
Source	Rating
Billboard	83/100
Cashbox	A-grade (Sleeper of the Week)

The single was met with a positive critical reception upon its release. Billboard magazine gave the single an 83/100 rating, saying "Mighty pretty waltz by Steve Allen, and Vale sings it with great style," adding that the "retentive tune and choral backing make it a good entry in current market." They concluded: "Worth jock and juke attention." Cashbox reviewed the single in mid-September and classified it as a "sleeper", giving it an A grade. They stated that it "is a heavy hearted love song tearfully fashioned against a lush string backdrop."

=== Chart performance ===
"Pretend You Don't See Her" was one of seven hits Vale had in the 1950s. It debuted on the Billboard Hot 100 on November 25, 1957, reaching No. 52 during a thirteen-week run on it. The track entered the Cashbox Top 60 Best-Selling Tunes on Records chart in the issue dated November 23, 1957, peaking at a higher No. 29 during its nine-week stay on it.

=== Track listing ===
7" single (Columbia 4-41010, 1957)
No.	Title	Writer(s)	Performance rights handled by	Length
1.	"Pretend You Don't See Her"	Steve Allen	ASCAP	2:39
2.	"The Spreading Chestnut"	Jimmy Duncan; Jerry Jacobson	Broadcast Music, Inc.	2:40

=== Charts ===
Chart performance for "Pretend You Don't See Her"
Chart (1957)	Peak position
US Billboard Hot 100	52
US Cashbox Best-Selling Tunes on Records	29

== Bobby Vee version ==
"Pretend You Don't See Her"

Single by Bobby Vee

from the album Bobby Vee's Golden Greats Vol. 2
- A-side: "(There'll Come A Day When) Ev'ry Little Bit Hurts"
- Released: November 1964
- Genre: Pop
- Length: 2:18
- Label: Liberty; 55751 / F-55751
- Songwriter: Steve Allen
- Producer: Snuff Garrett

Bobby Vee singles chronology
"Where Is She" (1964)	"Pretend You Don't See Her" (1964)	"Cross My Heart" (1965)

=== Background and release ===
Bobby Vee was a popular pop and rock 'n' roll singer in the 1960s, who had a string of hit singles right before the British Invasion. Thereafter, Vee had a difficult time remaining on the charts. Following a string of commercially unsuccessful singles, Liberty scheduled to release "(There'll Come A Day When) Ev'ry Little Bit Hurts" for November 1964. It was backed by "Pretend You Don't See Her" on the B-side, which along with the A-side later were featured in Vee's second greatest hits album titled Bobby Vee's Golden Greats Vol. 2. Ernie Freeman conducted and arranged the orchestra on both sides, while Snuff Garrett produced the single.

=== Critical reception ===
Professional ratings
Review scores
Source	Rating
Billboard	Spotlight Hot Pop
Cashbox	Positive (Pick of the Week)

The single was met with a positive critical reception upon its release. Billboard magazine put the song in its "Hot Pop" spotlights, indicating chart potential. Cashbox reviewed the single in mid-November and putting it in its "Pick of the Week" section they wrote: "There's a different Vee on the lovely lilting-beat-ballad updating of the while-back Jerry Vale hit, 'Pretend You Don't See Her,'" saying the "Side has loads of adult appeal."

=== Chart performance ===
"Pretend You Don't See Her" co-charted with "(There'll Come A Day When) Ev'ry Little Bit Hurts" briefly in late 1964. It debuted on the Billboard Hot 100 on December 5, 1964, reaching No. 97 during a one-week appearance on it. The song entered the Cashbox Top 100 Singles chart in the issue dated December 5, 1964, peaking at a higher No. 80 during its four-week stay on it. On the 100 Top Pops chart published by Record World, the track made it No. 93 on December 12, 1964. It would be in 1967 when Vee saw a comeback to the charts with a top-40 entry.

=== Track listing ===
7" single (Liberty 55751 / F-55751, 1964)
No.	Title	Writer(s)	Performance rights handled by	Length
1.	"(There'll Come A Day When) Ev'ry Little Bit Hurts"	B. Weisman, D. Wayne, M. Garret	ASCAP	2:28
2.	"Pretend You Don't See Her"	Steve Allen	ASCAP	2:18

=== Charts ===
Chart performance for "Pretend You Don't See Her"
Chart (1964)	Peak position
US Billboard Hot 100	97
US Cashbox Top 100 Singles	80
US Record World 100 Top Pops	93

== In popular culture ==
Jerry Vale's rendition of "Pretend You Don't See Her" was used two times in the 1990 crime film Goodfellas; it was used in the Friday night scene at the Copa with the girlfriends, and at Sunday dinner at Paulie's.
