= Do What You Gotta Do (album) =

Studio album by Bobby Vee
- Released: October 1968
- Genre: Pop
- Length: 29:52
- Label: Liberty
- Producer: Dallas Smith

Bobby Vee chronology
Just Today (1968)	Do What You Gotta Do (1968)	Gates, Grills & Railings (1969)

Singles from Do What You Gotta Do
- 1. "Run Like The Devil" Released: August 1965; 2. "Do What You Gotta Do" Released: August 1968

Do What You Gotta Do is the eighteenth studio album American singer Bobby Vee and was released in October 1968 by Liberty Records. "Do What You Gotta Do" was the album's lead single. Dallas Smith arranged and produced the album.

It contain several Motown covers including "I Can't Help Myself","That's What Love Songs Often Do", "Do What You Gotta Do". Vee also recorded different mix of "Run Like The Devil", which he recorded as a single in 1965

According to Robert Reynolds, in The Music of Bobby Vee, there are some good tracks besides “My Girl/Hey Girl” and “Just Keep it Up”, but even a similar medley attempt at combining the Four Tops splendid classics “I Can’t Help Myself/The Same Old Song”, does not capture the freshness of “My Girl/Hey Girl”. a R&B LP was planned, Regardless, of what might have been done with those tracks, the best songs on the Just Today and Do What You Gotta Do albums were the new tracks.

The album was released on compact disc by Beat Goes On on February 14, 2001, as tracks 12 through 22 on a pairing of two albums on one CD with tracks 1 through 11 consisting of Vee's 1968 album Just Today.

== Singles ==
"Run Like a Devil" bubbled under Billboard's Hot 100, reaching number 124, and also peaked at number 106 on the Cashbox Looking Ahead singles chart.

"Do What You Gotta Do" debuted on the Hot 100 on August 31, 1968, peaking at number 83 during a 4-week stay on the chart. It reached number 92 on the Cashbox Top 100 singles chart, and number 84 in Canada.

== Reception ==
Professional ratings
Review scores
Source	Rating
AllMusic	3.5/5 stars
The Encyclopedia of Popular Music	3/5 stars
Record Mirror	4/5 stars

Bruce Eder of AllMusic writes, "Vee proceeds with a surprisingly Motown-heavy (and surprisingly good) album of white pop-soul". Robert Reynolds, in The Music of Bobby Vee called it a "Good album".

Billboard called it "an appealing, gentle rocker". Cashbox gave the album a positive review, saying that it "showcases him in a performance of honest, strong ballads and rhythmic numbers."

== Track listing ==
Side one
No.	Title	Writer(s)	Length
1.	"Do What You Gotta Do"	Jimmy Webb	2:48
2.	"If My World Falls Through"	Kenny Gist, Jr.	2:47
3.	"Thank You"	Robert Thomas Velline	2:31
4.	"Beauty Is Only Skin Deep"	Norman Whitfield, Edward Holland, Jr.	2:37
5.	"Stubborn Kind of Fellow"	Marvin Gaye, William "Mickey" Stevenson, George Gordy	2:32
6.	"Can You Love a Poor Boy"	Ivy Hunter, Stevie Wonder	3:03

Side two
No.	Title	Writer(s)	Length
1.	"Medley: "I Can't Help Myself"/"It's the Same Old Song"	Brian Holland, Lamont Dozier, Eddie Holland	2:56
2.	"I Like It Like That"	William Robinson, Marv Tarplin	2:36
3.	"Run Like the Devil"	Paul Leka, Irwin Shuster	2:34
4.	"Let Nobody Love You (While I'm Gone)"	Jackie Avery, John Farris	2:59
5.	"That's What Love Is Made Of"	William Robinson, Bobby Rogers, Warren Moore	2:48

== Charts ==
=== Singles ===
Single	Year	Chart	Peak position
"Run Like a Devil"	1965	US Billboard Bubbling Under Hot 100	124
"Run Like a Devil"	1965	US Cashbox Looking Ahead	106
"Do What You Gotta Do"	1968	US Billboard Hot 100	98
"Do What You Gotta Do"	1968	US Cashbox Top 100	92
"Do What You Gotta Do"	1968	Canada Top Singles (RPM)	84
