= The Night Has a Thousand Eyes (album) =

Studio album by Bobby Vee
- Released: February 1963
- Genre: Pop
- Length: 26:28
- Label: Liberty
- Producer: Snuff Garrett

Bobby Vee chronology
| Merry Christmas from Bobby Vee (1962) | The Night Has a Thousand Eyes (1963) | Just for Fun (1963) |

Singles from The Night Has a Thousand Eyes
- 1. "The Night Has a Thousand Eyes" Released: November 23, 1962

The Night Has a Thousand Eyes is the ninth studio album by American singer Bobby Vee, and released in February 1963 by Liberty Records. Ernie Freeman arranged the album, while Snuff Garrett produced it.

The album features the tracks "The Night Has a Thousand Eyes", "Anonymous Phone Call", and the first recording of "Go Away Little Girl". Released as a single prior to the album, "The Night Has a Thousand Eyes" peaked at number three on the Billboard Hot 100 singles chart and number two on the Middle Road Singles chart in the United States and at number three in the United Kingdom.

The album debuted on the Billboard Top LPs chart in the issue dated April 13, 1963, peaking at No. 102. It reached No. 51 on the Cashbox albums chart and No. 15 on the UK Albums Album Chart.

The album was released on compact disc by Beat Goes On on September 16, 1998, as tracks 1 through 12 on a pairing of two albums on one CD with tracks 13 through 24 consisting of Vee's 1962 collaborative album, Bobby Vee Meets the Ventures. It was also released as one of two albums on one CD by Collectables Records on October 17, 2000, paired with Vee's 1962 collaborative album, Bobby Vee Meets the Crickets.

== Reception ==
Professional ratings
Review scores
| Source | Rating |
|---|---|
| AllMusic | 3/5 stars |
| New Record Mirror | 4/5 stars |
| The Encyclopedia of Popular Music | 3/5 stars |

Billboard selected the album for a "Spotlight Album" review and believed it "should turn into another strong-selling album" for Vee.

Cash Box claimed Vee's "wide-range voice and distinctive phrasing carry him in good stead on a host of pop favorites."

New Record Mirror raved, "Bobby's innumerable fans will be flocking to the shops to purchase copies and many folks will discover they like what they hear even though they may not be regular customers for Bobby's discs."

The Hartford Courant noted that Vee is "backed by a full orchestra and a good choral group" and "rambles through many pleasing current ballads".

Bruce Eder of AllMusic stated that "The Night Has a Thousand Eyes marked Bobby Vee's plunge into pop music", calling the title track "quintessential teen idol pop" and describing the rest of the album as "quality soft pop...but without anything resembling a dynamic or threatening edge."

== Track listing ==
=== Side one ===
| No. | Title | Writer(s) | Length |
|---|---|---|---|
| 1. | "Go Away Little Girl" | Carole King, Gerry Goffin | 2:14 |
| 2. | "It Might As Well Rain Until September" | Carole King, Gerry Goffin | 2:04 |
| 3. | "It Couldn't Happen to a Nicer Guy" | Mike Anthony, Paul Mann | 1:56 |
| 4. | "Theme for a Dream" | Mort Garson, Earl Shuman | 2:02 |
| 5. | "Silent Partner" | Robert Thomas Velline | 2:16 |
| 6. | "The Night Has a Thousand Eyes" | Ben Weisman, Dorothy Wayne, Marilyn Garrett | 2:35 |

=== Side two ===
| No. | Title | Writer(s) | Length |
|---|---|---|---|
| 1. | "You Won't Forget Me" | Jackie DeShannon, Sharon Sheeley | 2:08 |
| 2. | "Anonymous Phone Call" | Burt Bacharach, Hal David | 2:17 |
| 3. | "If She Were My Girl" | Carole King, Gerry Goffin | 2:12 |
| 4. | "Lover's Goodbye" | Bobby Vee, Thomas Lesslie "Snuff" Garrett | 2:27 |
| 5. | "Dry Your Eyes" | | 2:07 |
| 6. | "What About Me?" | Carole King, Gerry Goffin | 2:08 |

== Charts ==
Chart performance for The Night Has a Thousand Eyes
| Chart (1963) | Peak position |
|---|---|
| US Billboard Top LPs | 102 |
| US Cashbox Best-Selling Albums | 51 |
| UK Record Retailer Albums Chart | 15 |

Singles

| Year | Single | Chart | Peak position |
|---|---|---|---|
| 1963 | "The Night Has a Thousand Eyes" | | |
| 1963 | "The Night Has a Thousand Eyes" | Canada CHUM | 2 |
| 1963 | "The Night Has a Thousand Eyes" | UK Singles (OCC) | 3 |
| 1963 | "The Night Has a Thousand Eyes" | US Billboard Hot 100 | 3 |
| 1963 | "The Night Has a Thousand Eyes" | US Adult Contemporary (Billboard) | 2 |
| 1963 | "The Night Has a Thousand Eyes" | US Hot R&B/Hip-Hop Songs (Billboard) | 8 |
| 1963 | "The Night Has a Thousand Eyes" | US Cashbox Top 100 | 4 |
| 1963 | "Anonymous Phone Call" | US Billboard Hot 100 | 110 |
| 1963 | "Anonymous Phone Call" | US Cashbox Looking Ahead | 108 |
