= Bobby Vee with Strings and Things =

Studio album by Bobby Vee
- Released: June 1961
- Genre: Rock and roll
- Length: 25:26
- Label: Liberty
- Producer: Snuff Garrett

Bobby Vee chronology
Bobby Vee (1961)	Bobby Vee with Strings and Things (1961)	Bobby Vee Sings Hits of the Rockin' 50's (1961)

Singles from Bobby Vee with Strings and Things
- 1. "How Many Tears" Released: April 17, 1961

Bobby Vee with Strings and Things is the third studio album American singer Bobby Vee, and was released in June 1961 by Liberty Records. It features a mix of originals and covers of songs by Little Anthony and the Imperials and Buddy Holly.

The single, "How Many Tears", debuted on the Billboard Hot 100 in the chart dated May 29, 1961, reaching number 63 in a five-week stay. and number 43 on the Cashbox singles charts during it eight-week stay and number ten during it 13-week stay. Another single, "Baby Face", spent a week on the Billboard Bubbling Under Hot 100 Singles chart in the issue dated May 8, 1961, peaking at number 113, and number 97 on the Cashbox singles charts during it two-week stay.

The Album debuted on the Cashbox albums chart in the issue dated June 10, 1961, and spent a week on the charts at number 47.

The album was released on compact disc by Beat Goes On on March 10, 1999 as tracks 1 through 12 on a pairing of two albums on one CD with tracks 13 through 24 consisting of Vee's 1961 album, Bobby Vee Sings Hits of the Rockin' 50's.

Reel To Reel labels included this CD in a box set entitled Eight Classic Albums Plus Bonus Singles and was released on October 4, 2019.

== Reception ==
Professional ratings
Review scores
Source	Rating
AllMusic	3.5/5 stars
Record Mirror	4/5 stars
The Encyclopedia of Popular Music	3/5 stars
Disc	3/5 stars

Bruce Eder of AllMusic praises Vee's covers of tracks such as Buddy Holly's "Love's Made a Fool of You" and Paul Anka's "Each Night", but believes "the overall album is decidedly uneven in approach and results, but what does work here as rock & roll and decent teen pop is enough to make it worth hearing".

Billboard selected the album for a "Spotlight Album" review, stating that it featured "good classy string backings".

Cash Box described the album as "Powerful" and noted that it had "a variety of moods with various accompaniments."

New Record Mirror said Vee proves "himself to be a much better vocalist than some of his pop singles would have led you to believe" and "provides a most entertaining session on this LP."

Nigel Hunter of Disc notes "Vee works through up-tempo and slow teen-type ballads."

== Track listing ==
=== Side one ===
No.	Title	Writer(s)	Length
1.	"Baby Face"	Harry Akst, Benny Davis	2:03
2.	"Pledging My Love"	Ferdinand Washington, Don Robey	2:46
3.	"Love's Made a Fool of You"	Buddy Holly	1:52
4.	"Light Infatuation"	DeWayne Blackwell	1:50
5.	"Suzie-Q"	Eleanor Broadwater, Dale Hawkins, Stan Lewis	1:41
6.	"Tears on My Pillow"	Sylvester Bradford, Al Lewis	2:03

=== Side two ===
No.	Title	Writer(s)	Length
1.	"How Many Tears"	Carole King, Gerry Goffin	2:03
2.	"That's All"	Bob Haymes, Alan Brandt	2:19
3.	"Diana"	Paul Anka	1:57
4.	"Laurie"		2:05
5.	"Each Night"	Paul Anka	2:15
6.	"Bashful Bob"	Snuff Garrett, Dick Glasser	2:12

== Charts ==
Chart performance for Bobby Vee with Strings and Things
Chart (1961)	Peak position
Cashbox Best-Selling Monaural Albums	47

Singles

Single	Year	Chart	Peak position
"How Many Tears"	1961	Billboard Hot 100	63
"How Many Tears"	1961	Cashbox Top 100 Singles	43
"How Many Tears"	1961	UK Singles Chart	10
"Baby Face"	1961	Billboard Bubbling Under Hot 100	119
"Baby Face"	1961	Cashbox Top 100 Singles	97
