= Suzie Baby =

Song by Bobby Vee and the Shadows

from the album Bobby Vee's Golden Greats
- B-side: "Flyin' High"
- Released: June 1959
- Recorded: June 1, 1959
- Studio: Kaybank Studios
- Genre: Teen pop
- Length: 2:48
- Label: Soma (later, Liberty)
- Songwriter: Bobby Vee

Bobby Vee and the Shadows singles chronology
"Suzie Baby" (1959)	"What Do You Want" (1960)

"Suzie Baby" is a 1959 American teen pop song written by Bobby Vee and performed by Bobby Vee and the Shadows, Vee's first release. It was released on the Minnesota-based Soma Records, and was a regional hit in Minnesota and the upper midwest. It was bought by Liberty Records who released it nationally later that same year, where it reached the lower part of the Billboard hot 100 chart.

"Suzie Baby" did not appear on an album until the 1962 compilation Bobby Vee's Golden Greats, after Vee had released several other albums.

Bob Dylan, who had very briefly played piano with Vee's backing band, played "Suzi Baby" at his July 10, 2013 concert in St. Paul after praising Vee ("the most meaningful person I've ever been on the stage with"), who was in the audience.
