= C'mon, Let's Live a Little =

1967 film by David Butler

- Film poster
- Directed by: David Butler
- Written by: June Starr
- Produced by: Alexander Borisoff
- Starring: Bobby Vee
- Cinematography: Carl Berger
- Edited by: Eve Newman
- Music by: Don Ralke
- Production companies: All-Star Pictures; Hertlandy Associates
- Distributed by: Paramount Pictures
- Release date: 1967
- Running time: 84 minutes
- Country: United States
- Language: English

C'mon, Let's Live a Little is a 1967 film directed by David Butler. It stars Bobby Vee and Jackie DeShannon.

This was the last film directed by Butler, who began acting on screen in 1917 and had been directing since the late 1920s.

== Plot ==
Enrolling in an Arkansas college, singer Jesse Crawford saves the life of Judy Grant, a dean's daughter. She is grateful until Jesse performs at a rally staged by a student looking to discredit the dean, but Jesse was unaware of the rally's purpose and all is forgiven.

== Cast ==
- Bobby Vee as Jesse Crawford
- Jackie DeShannon as Judy Grant
- Eddie Hodges as Eddie Stewart
- Suzie Kaye as Bee Bee Vendemeer
- Patsy Kelly as Mrs. Fitts
- Kim Carnes as Melinda
- Frank Alesia as Balta
- Ken Osmond as The Beard

== Production ==
Shot in 1966, director David Butler recalled the film was shot quickly, ran out of funds and was delayed release.

== Soundtrack ==
C'mon Let's Live a Little

Soundtrack album by Various including Bobby Vee & Jackie DeShannon
- Released: August 1966
- Genre: Pop
- Length: 25:46
- Label: Liberty
- Producer: Snuff Garrett

Professional ratings
Review scores
| Source | Rating |
|---|---|
| AllMusic | 3/5 stars |

The soundtrack album to the film was released in August 1966 by Liberty Records. The songs from the soundtrack were written by Don Crawford and were performed by Bobby Vee and Jackie DeShannon, among others.

=== Track listing ===
All tracks are written by Don Crawford.

Side one
| No. | Title | Performer(s) | Length |
|---|---|---|---|
| 1. | "C'mon Let's Live A Little – Opening Main Title" | | 2:14 |
| 2. | "Instant Girl" | Bobby Vee | 2:28 |
| 3. | "Baker Man" | Jackie DeShannon | 2:05 |
| 4. | "C'mon Let's Live a Little" | Suzie Kaye | 2:12 |
| 5. | "What Fool This Mortal Be" | Bobby Vee | 2:25 |
| 6. | "Tonight's the Night" | The Pair | 2:38 |

Side two
| No. | Title | Performer(s) | Length |
|---|---|---|---|
| 1. | "For Granted" | Jackie DeShannon | 2:50 |
| 2. | "Back-Talk" | Bobby Vee & Jackie DeShannon | 2:12 |
| 3. | "Over and Over" | Bobby Vee | 2:09 |
| 4. | "Let's Go Go" | Eddie Hodges | 2:13 |
| 5. | "Way Back Home" | Ethel Smith & Don Crawford | 2:20 |
| 6. | "C'mon Let's Live a Little – End Title" | | 0:30 |

== See also ==
- List of American films of 1967
