= I Remember Buddy Holly =

Studio album by Bobby Vee
- Released: December 1963
- Genre: Rock and roll
- Length: 25:35
- Label: Liberty
- Producer: Snuff Garrett

Bobby Vee chronology
Bobby Vee Meets the Ventures (1963)	I Remember Buddy Holly (1963)	The New Sound from England! (1964)

I Remember Bobby Holly is the eleventh studio album by American singer, Bobby Vee, and was released in December 1963 by Liberty Records. Ernie Freeman arranged the album, while Snuff Garrett produced it. It is a tribute album to the songs of rock and roll and rockabilly singer Buddy Holly, whom Vee listed among his influences. After Holly was killed on February 3, 1959, along with Ritchie Valens, the Big Bopper, and pilot Roger Peterson when their plane crashed in Iowa on their way to Fargo, North Dakota, Vee was selected to replace Holly on the tour, which led to the launch of his recording career.

The album features a collection of Holly's greatest hits, including "Maybe Baby", "That'll Be the Day", "Oh, Boy!", "Everyday" (which he previously recorded and appeared on his 1960 album, Bobby Vee Sings Your Favorites), "Raining in My Heart" (which he also previously recorded and appeared on his 1962 album, Take Good Care of My Baby), and a song titled "Buddy's Song" which Holly wrote, but never recorded.

The album debuted on the Cashbox albums chart in the issue dated December 21, 1963, and remained on the album chart for 10 weeks, peaking at No. 54.

== Reception ==
Professional ratings
Review scores
Source	Rating
AllMusic	3.5/5 stars
Record Mirror	4/5 stars
The Encyclopedia of Popular Music	3/5 stars

Bruce Eder of AllMusic called it an "inevitable development", and stated that the album contains "Vee's underrated vocal ability and Garrett's killer production work, which successfully encompasses pop/rock, rockabilly, straight-ahead rock & roll, and some surprisingly sophisticated balladry".

Billboard called it "[Vee's] salute to late great Holly, by giving his own treatments with an assist from the Eligibles".

Cashbox gave a positive review, writing that Vee delivers the songs in a "successful Holly manner" with "these twelve favorites".

Variety notes Vee "does a strong job on the material, which includes ballads as well as big jumpers like 'Peggy Sue' and 'That'll Be The Day'."

Record Mirror felt that Vee makes a "tribute to Buddy in the only possible way – by recording an album of his great songs".

South Pasadena Review called it a "wonderful tribute" and stated that Vee "had wanted to make an album in tribute to Buddy for some time and finally has gotten around" to it.

== Track listing ==
Side one
No.	Title	Writer(s)	Length
1.	"That'll Be the Day"	Buddy Holly, Jerry Allison, Norman Petty	2:15
2.	"It Doesn't Matter Anymore"	Paul Anka	1:58
3.	"Peggy Sue"	Holly, Allison, Petty	2:18
4.	"True Love Ways"	Holly, Petty	2:37
5.	"It's So Easy!"	Holly, Petty	2:04
6.	"Heartbeat"	Bob Montgomery, Norman Petty	2:02

Side two
No.	Title	Writer(s)	Length
1.	"Oh, Boy!"	Sonny West, Bill Tilghman, Petty	2:01
2.	"Raining in My Heart"	Felice Bryant, Boudleaux Bryant	2:50
3.	"Think It Over"	Holly, Petty	1:47
4.	"Maybe Baby"	Holly, Petty	2:04
5.	"Early in the Morning"	Bobby Darin, Woody Harris	2:07
6.	"Buddy's Song"	Holly	1:51

== Charts ==
Chart (1963)	Peak position
US Cashbox Top 100 Monaural Albums	54
