= Come Back When You Grow Up =

Single by Bobby Vee and The Strangers

from the album Come Back When You Grow Up
- B-side: "Swahili Serenade"
- Released: June 9, 1967
- Genre: Pop rock
- Length: 2:15
- Label: Liberty Records 55982
- Songwriter: Martha Sharp
- Producer: Dallas Smith

Bobby Vee and The Strangers singles chronology
"Here Today" (1966)	"Come Back When You Grow Up" (1967)	"Beautiful People" (1967)

"Come Back When You Grow Up" is a song written by Martha Sharp and performed by Bobby Vee and The Strangers. It appeared on his 1967 album, Come Back When You Grow Up, was produced by Dallas Smith and arranged by William Hood.

== Background ==
A slightly longer version from the album features a brief instrumental introduction before Vee comes in, while on the single version, the song begins with Vee's vocals.

== Chart performance ==
"Come Back When You Grow Up" was a comeback for the 24 year-old Vee, and it reached No.3 on the Billboard Hot 100 in 1967. and No.2 in Canada. It was ranked No.15 on Billboard magazine's Top Hot 100 songs of 1967 and No.29 in Canada.

== Other versions ==
- Johnny Tillotson's recording was included on his 1967 album "Here I am".
- Los Freddy's released his take entitled "Cuando Seas Mujer" on their 1968, Mató Mi Corazon.
- Leif Garrett put out a single in 1977, which did not chart.

== Certifications ==
Certifications for "Come Back When You Grow Up"
Region	Certification	Certified units/sales
United States (RIAA)	Gold	1,000,000^{^}
^{^} Shipments figures based on certification alone.
