= How Many Tears =

Single by Bobby Vee

from the album Bobby Vee with Strings and Things
- B-side: "Baby Face"
- Released: April 1961
- Genre: Pop
- Length: 2:03
- Label: Liberty Records 55325
- Songwriter(s): Gerry Goffin, Carole King
- Producer(s): Snuff Garrett

Bobby Vee singles chronology
"Stayin' In" (1961)	"How Many Tears" (1961)	"Take Good Care of My Baby" (1961)

"How Many Tears" is a song written by Gerry Goffin and Carole King. The song was produced by Snuff Garrett, and performed by Bobby Vee featuring The Johnny Mann Singers. The song reached #10 in the UK, #43 in Canada, and #63 on the Billboard Hot 100 in 1961. It was featured on his 1962 album, Bobby Vee's Golden Greats.

The single's B-side, "Baby Face", reached #3 in Australia, #97 in Canada and #119 on the Billboard chart.

== Other versions ==
- Tami Lynn released a version as the B-side to her single, "Mojo Hannah" in July 1971.
