= Charms (Bobby Vee song) =

Single by Bobby Vee
- B-side: "Bobby Tomorrow"
- Released: March 1963
- Recorded: January 7, 1963
- Genre: Pop
- Length: 2:13
- Label: Liberty Records 55530
- Songwriter(s): Helen Miller, Howard Greenfield
- Producer(s): Snuff Garrett

Bobby Vee singles chronology
"The Night Has a Thousand Eyes" (1962)	"Charms" (1963)	"Be True to Yourself" (1963)

"Charms" is a 1963 song written by Helen Miller and Howard Greenfield. The song was produced by Snuff Garrett and arranged by Ernie Freeman, and performed by Bobby Vee featuring the Johnny Mann Singers. "Charms" reached #5 on the Easy Listening chart and #13 on the Billboard Hot 100. Outside the US, the song peaked at #20 in Canada.

The single's B-side, "Bobby Tomorrow", reached #21 in the United Kingdom.

== Other versions ==
- Rob de Nijs and The Lords released a version as the B-side to their single "How Do You Do It?" in June 1963 in the Netherlands.
