= Rubber Ball =

Single by Bobby Vee

from the album Bobby Vee
- B-side: "Everyday"
- Released: Late 1960
- Recorded: August 12, 1960
- Genre: Brill Building pop
- Length: 2:17
- Label: Liberty Records F-55287
- Songwriter: A. Orlowski/Aaron Schroeder
- Producer: Snuff Garrett

Bobby Vee singles chronology
"Devil or Angel" (1960)	"Rubber Ball" (1960)	"Stayin' In" (1961)

"Rubber Ball" was an early 1961 hit for Bobby Vee on Liberty Records. It was the record which made Vee an international star. The song was recorded on August 12, 1960, in a four-song, three-hour session at United in Hollywood. It was produced by Thomas "Snuff" Garrett, arranged by Ernie Freeman, and was co-written at the Brill Building in New York by Gene Pitney, using his mother's maiden name (Orlowski), and by Aaron Schroeder. Veteran session drummer Earl Palmer played drums at the session. The record marked Vee's first use of overdubbing his second vocal.

== Chart performance ==
The song was Vee's fifth US single release making #6 on the Billboard charts. Outside the US, "Rubber Ball" was a breakthrough hit for him in the UK, where it reached #4. It also reached #4 in Canada. In Australia, it was Vee's only #1 record; it stayed at the top for three weeks in early 1961.

== Cover versions ==
- A version by British singer Marty Wilde reached #9 the charts in 1961. In 1977 finnish artist M.A. Numminen released a version in Swedish, "Gummiboll" which was a hit in Sweden at the time.
