= The Night Has a Thousand Eyes (song) =

- Side-A label of the US single

Single by Bobby Vee

from the album The Night Has a Thousand Eyes
- B-side: "Anonymous Phone Call"
- Released: December 1962
- Recorded: October 9, 1962; United Recorders; Hollywood, California
- Genre: Pop
- Length: 2:37
- Label: Liberty
- Songwriters: Benjamin Weisman, Dorothy Wayne, Marilyn Garrett

Bobby Vee singles chronology
"A Forever Kind of Love" (1962)	"The Night Has a Thousand Eyes" (1962)	"Charms" (1963)

Official audio
- " The Night Has a Thousand Eyes" on YouTube

"The Night Has a Thousand Eyes" is a song written by Benjamin Weisman, Dorothy Wayne, and Marilyn Garrett. It became a popular hit in 1962 for Bobby Vee and has had several cover versions over the years.

== Bobby Vee version ==
The song was first recorded in October 1962 by American pop music singer Bobby Vee, at United Recorders, Hollywood, California. The recording was arranged by Ernie Freeman and produced by Snuff Garrett.

Released as a single in late 1962, it spent 14 weeks on the Billboard Hot 100 chart, reaching number 3, while ranking number 2 on Billboard's Middle-Road Singles chart, and number 8 on Billboard's Hot R&B Singles chart. It also spent 12 weeks on the UK's Record Retailer chart, achieving number 3 on March 6, 1963. The song was included on Vee's 1963 Liberty Records album, The Night Has a Thousand Eyes. Vee also recorded a Scopitone promotional video for the song.

== Chart performance ==
=== Weekly charts ===
Chart (1962–1963)	Peak position
Australia - Music Maker	5
Canada (CHUM Hit Parade)	2
Ireland (IRMA)	1
New Zealand - Lever Hit Parade	5
US Billboard Hot 100	3
US Billboard Middle-Road Singles	2
US Hot R&B Singles	8
US Cashbox Top 100	4
UK Record Retailer	3

=== Year-end charts ===
Chart (1963)	Rank
US Billboard Hot 100	78
US Cash Box	31

== Other versions ==
- The Angels recorded a cover version for their 1963 album My Boyfriend's Back.
- In 1965, Gary Lewis & the Playboys included a version of the song on their first album This Diamond Ring; it can also be heard on their album Complete Hits.
- The Carpenters featured the song on their 1973 album Now & Then.
- Canadian pop singer-songwriter Dan Bryk's cover version appeared on the 1997 compilation Super Secret Songs: A Benefit For Kitchener’s Korova Cafe and as a Japanese bonus track on his Lovers Leap album in 2000.
