= Devil or Angel =

1956 song performed by The Clovers

Single by The Clovers
- B-side: "Hey, Doll Baby"
- Released: January 1956
- Recorded: 1955
- Genre: R&B
- Length: 2:22
- Label: Atlantic
- Songwriter: Blanche Carter

The Clovers singles chronology
"Nip Sip" (1955)	"Devil or Angel" (1956)	"Love, Love, Love" (1956)

"Devil or Angel"

Single by Bobby Vee

from the album Bobby Vee Sings Your Favorites
- B-side: "Since I Met You Baby"
- Released: June 21, 1960
- Recorded: 1960
- Genre: Pop
- Length: 2:15
- Label: Liberty
- Songwriter: Blanche Carter

Bobby Vee singles chronology
"One Last Kiss" (1960)	"Devil or Angel" (1960)	"Since I Met You Baby" (1960)

"Devil or Angel" is a song written by Blanche Carter and originally recorded by the Clovers in 1955, where it went to number four on the US R&B Best Sellers chart. It was re-recorded by John Bailey after he left the Clovers and formed another Clovers group for Lana Records in 1965.

== Later versions ==
- The song was recorded by Bobby Vee, with veteran session drummer Earl Palmer among the studio musicians, and reached number 6 in the US charts in 1960, and number 2 in Canada. It was Vee's first Top 10 hit. This version was also a crossover hit on the R&B chart.
- It was later recorded by both Johnny Crawford and Jesse Winchester. Neither of those versions charted on the Billboard Hot 100 singles chart.
- The Hollywood Flames released a version of the song as a single in 1960.
- Tony Scotti recorded the song in 1969. The single peaked at #117 on Billboard's "Bubbling Under" chart.
- Ezra Furman recorded a cover of the song featured in Netflix's Sex Education.
- Billy Fury recorded a version of the song, produced by Stuart Coleman which reached number 58 in the UK charts in 1982.
