= BGO Records =

British record label

BGO Records (Beat Goes On) is a British record label specializing in classic rock, blues, jazz, and folk music.

In 1965, Andy Gray opened Andy's Records and set up a market stall in Bury St Edmunds, Suffolk. Year by year he opened up more shops. In 1987, he started the BGO label with Mike Gott. Gott left the label in 2004 to set up his own label, Gott Discs. However, Gott returned to BGO in late 2008.

== See also ==
- List of record labels
