= Bobby Vee =

American singer (1943–2016)

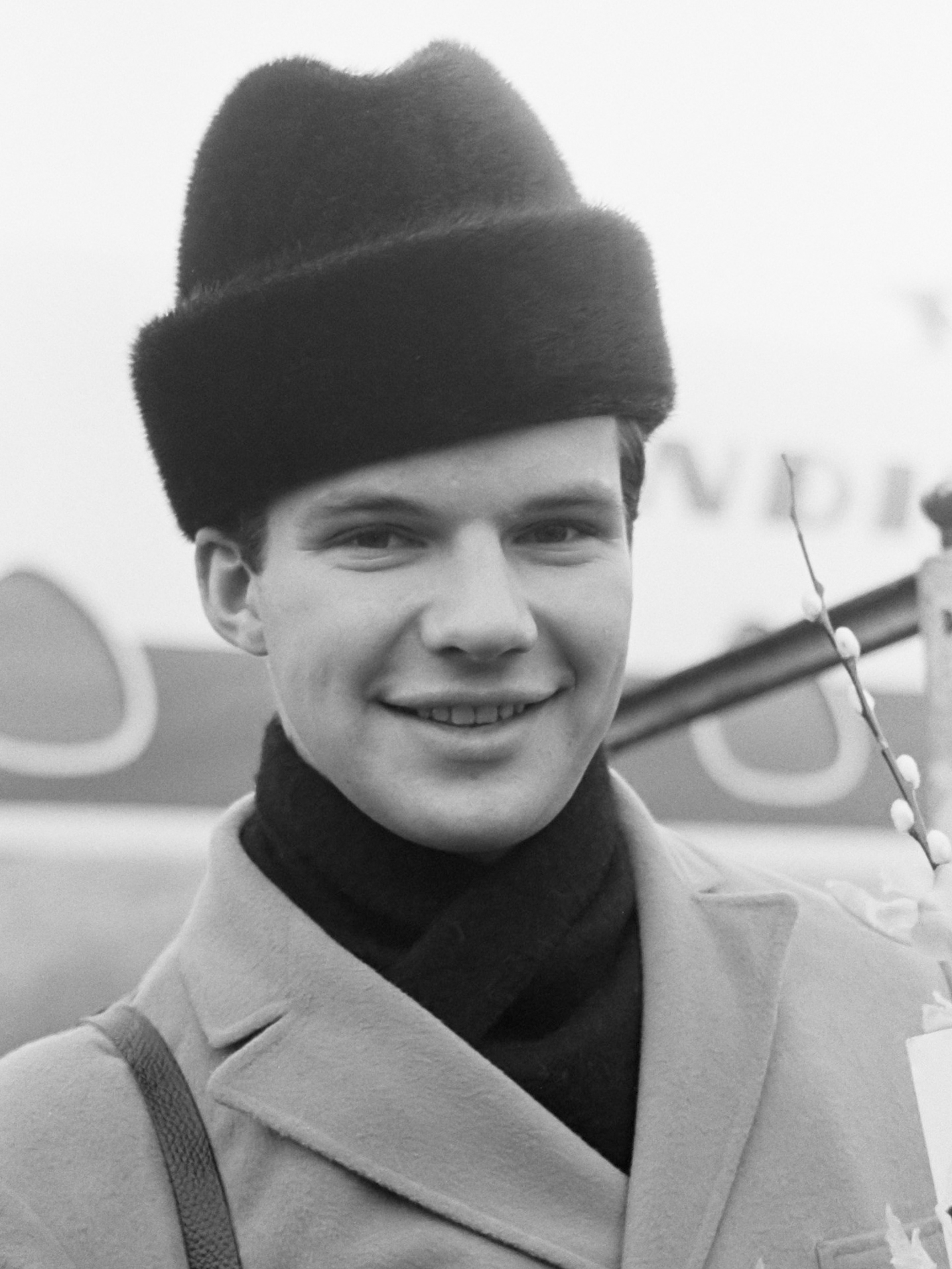
- Vee in 1962

Background information
- Born: Robert Thomas Velline; April 30, 1943; Fargo, North Dakota, U.S.
- Died: October 24, 2016 (aged 73) Rogers, Minnesota, U.S.
- Genres: Pop; rock and roll; Brill Building
- Occupation: Singer
- Years active: 1959–2014
- Label: Liberty Records
- Website: bobbyvee.com

Robert Thomas Velline (April 30, 1943 – October 24, 2016), known professionally as Bobby Vee, was an American singer who was a teen idol in the early 1960s and also appeared in films. According to Billboard magazine, he had thirty-eight Hot 100 chart hits, ten of which reached the Top 20. He had six gold singles in his career.

== Early life ==
Vee was born in Fargo, North Dakota, to Sydney Ronald Velline (a chef, pianist and fiddle player) and Saima Cecelia Tapanila, in a family of Norwegian and Finnish heritage. He attended Central High School in Fargo where he learned to play the saxophone.

== Career ==
=== The Day the Music Died ===
Vee's career began in the midst of tragedy. On February 3, 1959, "The Day the Music Died", three of the four headline acts in the lineup of the traveling Winter Dance Party—Buddy Holly, Ritchie Valens, and the Big Bopper—were killed in the crash of a V-tailed 1947 Beechcraft Bonanza airplane, along with the 21-year-old pilot, Roger Peterson. It crashed near Clear Lake, Iowa, en route to the next show on the tour itinerary, in Moorhead, Minnesota. Vee, then 15 years old, and a hastily assembled band of Fargo schoolboys (including his older brother Bill) calling themselves the Shadows, volunteered for and were given the job of filling in for Holly and his band at the Moorhead engagement. Their performance there was a success and started Vee's career as a popular singer.

In 1963, Vee released a tribute album on Liberty Records called I Remember Buddy Holly. In the liner notes, he recalled Holly's influence on him and the events surrounding Holly's death, describing how he had looked forward to attending the concert, how the local radio station put out a call for local talent to fill after the disaster, and how Vee's recently organized group, modeled on Holly's style, had to make up a name (the Shadows) on the spot.

Vee became a star, and he performed regularly at Winter Dance Party memorial concerts in Clear Lake. His three sons, all musicians, performed with him there.

=== Music ===
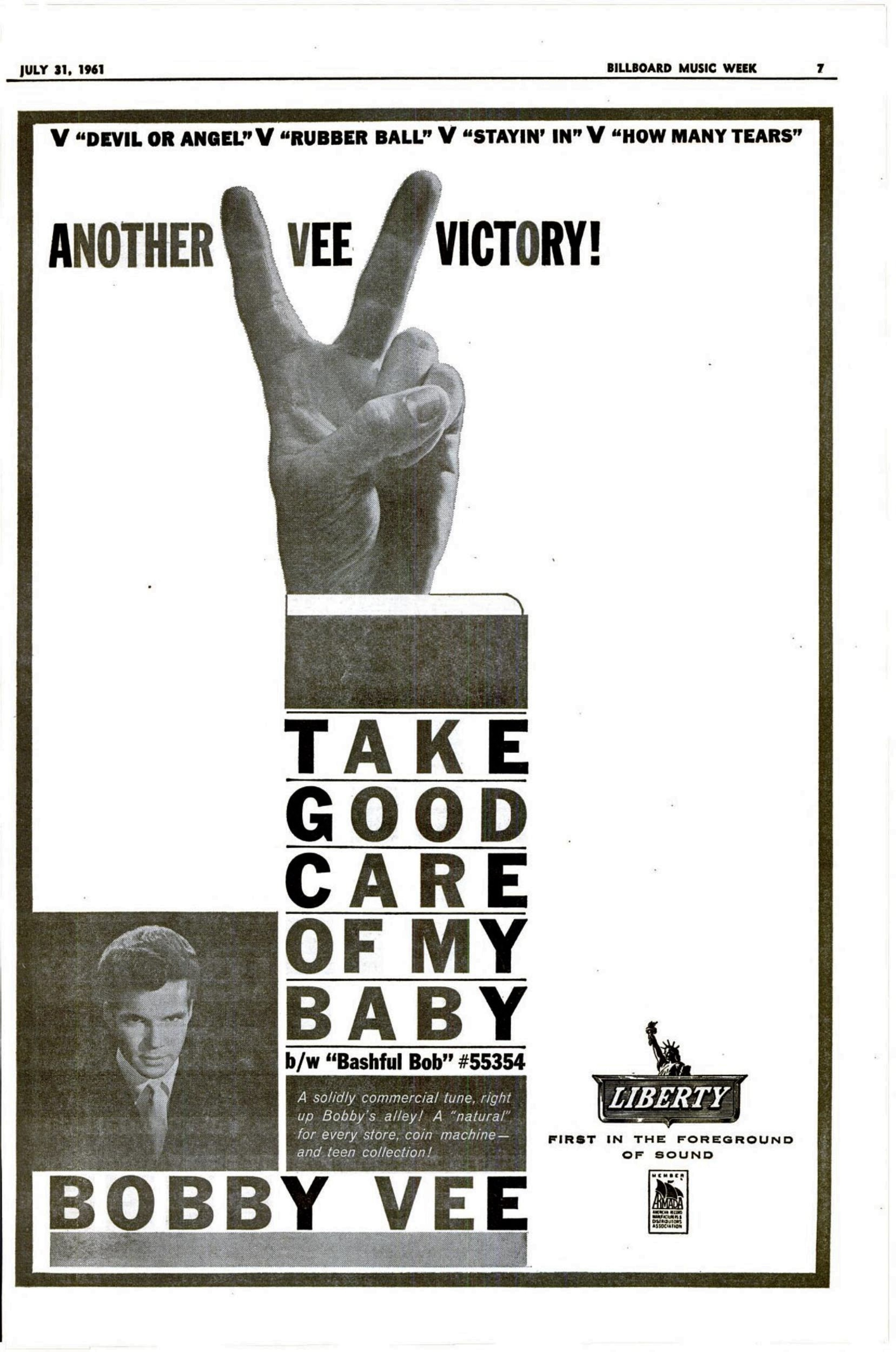
Billboard advertisement, July 31 1961

His first single, "Suzie Baby", was written by Vee with a nod to Buddy Holly's "Peggy Sue" and was recorded in 1959 for the Minneapolis-based Soma label. The record was a hit in Minnesota and drew enough national attention to be purchased by Liberty Records, which signed Vee later that year.

Vee's follow-up single, a cover of Adam Faith's UK number-one "What Do You Want?", charted in the lower reaches of the Billboard pop chart in early 1960. His fourth release, a revival of the Clovers' doo-wop ballad "Devil or Angel" (U.S. number six), brought him into the big time with U.S. buyers. His next single, "Rubber Ball" (1961, U.S. number six, Australia number one), made him an international star. He has cited as influences producer Snuff Garrett and his personal manager, Arnold Mills. Vee's recording of "Take Good Care of My Baby" went to number one on Billboard magazine's U.S. pop chart in the summer of 1961 and number three in the UK Singles Chart.

Known primarily as a performer of so-called "Brill Building pop" material, Vee went on to record a string of international hits in the 1960s, including "More Than I Can Say" (1961, UK number 4), "Run to Him" (1961, US number 2; UK number 6), and "The Night Has A Thousand Eyes" (1963, US number 3; UK number 3). In 1961 Vee recorded a version of the song "Lollipop", originally by Ronald & Ruby, which also became a success. Vee had a total of ten hit singles in the UK, ending with "Bobby Tomorrow" (UK number 21) in 1963.

In 1963, American Bandstand signed Vee to headline Dick Clark's Caravan of Stars national U.S. tour, scheduled to perform its 15th show on the night of November 22, 1963, at the Memorial Auditorium in Dallas, Texas. The Friday evening event was cancelled after U.S. President John F. Kennedy was assassinated that afternoon while touring Dallas in an open-car motorcade.

However, Bobby Vee's chart performance declined, and none of his records reached the top 40 in 1964 and 1965. Vee returned to the top 10 with the single "Come Back When You Grow Up" (1967, US number 3). On the recording of "Come Back When You Grow Up", Bobby Vee and the Strangers are credited. However, that was merely the record label giving a name to the studio musicians working that day. Bobby's original band, the Shadows, backed him on the road; upon learning of the UK band the Shadows who backed Cliff Richard, the band changed its name to the Strangers. Following the success of the comeback single, Vee had a string of contemporary singles which performed well enough for Liberty to issue three more studio albums in the late 1960s: Just Today, Do What You Gotta Do, and Gates, Grills & Railings. Just Today marked Vee's final appearance on the Billboard Top LP's chart as well.

Vee was also a pioneer in the music video genre, appearing in several musical films and in the Scopitone series of early film-and-music jukebox recordings.

=== Connection with Bob Dylan ===
Early in Vee's career, a musician calling himself Elston Gunnn briefly toured with the band. This was Robert Allen Zimmerman, who later went on to fame as Bob Dylan. Dylan's autobiography mentions Vee and provides complimentary details about their friendship, both professional and personal.

In a concert at Midway Stadium in St. Paul, Minnesota, on July 10, 2013, Dylan said he had been on the stage with many stars, but that none of them were as meaningful as Vee. He said Vee was in the audience and then played Vee's hit "Suzie Baby" with emotion. Dylan said (in a video recording of the concert):

Thank you everyone, thank you friends. I lived here a while back, and since that time, I've played all over the world, with all kinds of people. And everybody from Mick Jagger to Madonna. And everybody in there in between. I've been on the stage with most of those people. But the most beautiful person I've ever been on the stage with, was a man who is here tonight, who used to sing a song called "Suzie Baby". I want to say that Bobby Vee is actually here tonight. Maybe you can show your appreciation with just a round of applause. So, we're gonna try to do this song, like I've done it with him before once or twice.

Dylan also recalled that Vee "had a metallic, edgy tone to his voice and it was as musical as a silver bell." Vee remembered that the musician he knew as Gunnn (Bob Dylan) "played pretty good in the key of C."

Bobby and his sons opened and operated Rockhouse Productions in an old bank building in St. Joseph, Minnesota, which continues in operation. The Vees helped organize and performed for a number of years in the annual July 3 St. Joseph "Joetown Rocks" festival drawing many thousands of fans and area residents.

=== Last years and death ===
Vee continued performing live until 2011 when diagnosed with Alzheimer's disease. In 2011, friends and family contributed to his final new recordings which were eventually released as The Adobe Sessions on February 3, 2014. On April 29, 2012, Vee announced publicly that he had been diagnosed with Alzheimer's and consequently would withdraw from the music business. He had been in memory care (long-term care to meet the needs of those with Alzheimer's disease, dementia or other types of memory problems) for 13 months in a long-term care facility in Rogers, Minnesota, just outside of Minneapolis, and eventually received hospice care in the weeks prior to his death. On October 24, 2016, Vee died from complications of the disease at the age of 73.

=== Personal life ===
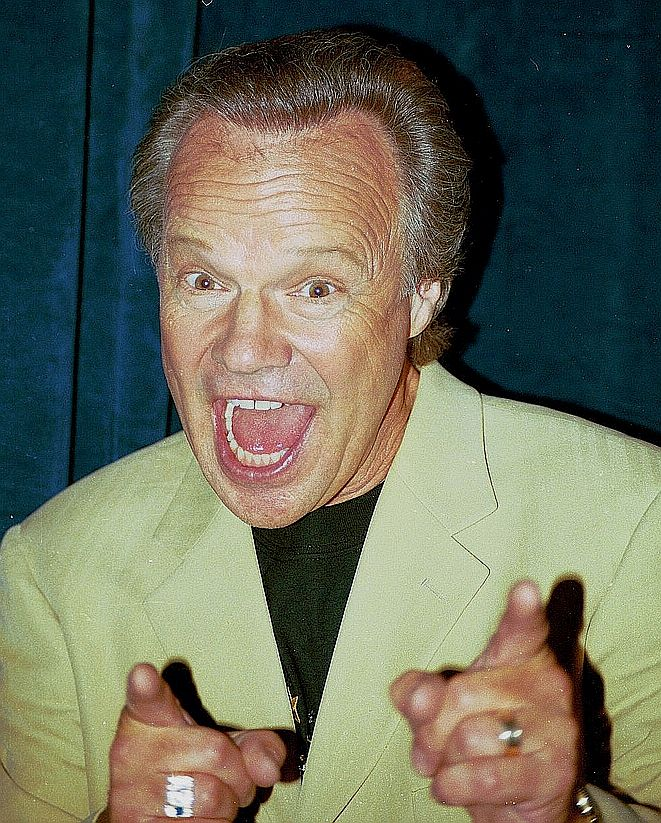
Vee in 1998

Vee and Karen Bergen married on December 28, 1963. In the early 1980s, Vee moved his family from Los Angeles to near St. Cloud, Minnesota, where he and Karen organized annual fundraising concerts to provide music and arts facilities for local children. They had four children, including sons Jeffrey, Thomas, and Robert, who performed with Vee in his later career, and daughter Jennifer. Karen died of kidney failure on August 3, 2015, less than a year and a half before Vee's death.

== Awards and honors ==
Vee received the North Dakota Roughrider Award in 1999.

He is mentioned in the film No Direction Home regarding his brief musical association with Bob Dylan and Dylan's suggestion that he was "Bobby Vee" after Vee's regional hit.

The Very Best of Bobby Vee, released by EMI/UK on May 12, 2008, charted in the UK top five. On January 17, 2011, EMI/UK released Rarities, a double-CD package with 61 tracks, many of which were previously unreleased. Others included were alternate takes and first-time stereo releases as well as tracks from the album Bobby Vee Live on Tour, without the "canned" audience.

On March 28, 2011, Vee became the 235th inductee into the Rockabilly Hall of Fame.

An active live performer into 2011, Vee was diagnosed with Alzheimer's disease, at which time he completed his scheduled tour obligations and recorded his final CD, released three years later. In 2014 Vee was inducted into the Scandinavian-American Hall of Fame.

== Discography ==
Over the course of his career Vee achieved six gold singles and one gold album.

=== Gold singles ===
- "Devil or Angel" (1960)
- "Rubber Ball" (1961)
- "Take Good Care of My Baby" (1961)
- "Run to Him" (1961)
- "The Night Has a Thousand Eyes" (1962)
- "Come Back When You Grow Up" (1967) (Bobby Vee and The Strangers)

=== Gold albums ===
- The Bobby Vee Singles Album (1980) certified gold in the UK.

== Filmography ==
- Swingin' Along (1961), Lippert Films, color, 74 minutes, director: Charles Barton, producer: Jack Leewood, screenplay: Arthur Morton. - Himself

A comedy about a songwriting contest, originally released in 1961 as Double Trouble. Scenes were added of Ray Charles (doing "What'd I Say") and Bobby Vee ("More Than I Can Say").

- Play It Cool (1962), Allied Artists, black and white, 82 minutes, director: Michael Winner, producers: Leslie Parkyn, Julian Wintle, screenplay: Jack Henry. - Himself

Selection of early 1960s performers woven through a plot about a bratty, rich teenage girl looking for her boyfriend. Vee sings "At A Time Like This".

- Just for Fun (1963), Columbia Pictures, black and white, 85 minutes, director: Gordon Fleming, producer and screenplay: Milton Subotsky. - Himself

British teens win the right to vote, so the two major political parties strive to win this new voting bloc to their sides. Meanwhile, there's a parade of pop stars including Freddy Cannon, Ketty Lester, Jeremy Lloyd, Bobby Vee, the Crickets, the Springfields, Jet Harris, Tony Meehan, Joe Brown and the Bruvvers, the Tornados, Brian Poole and the Tremeloes, and Johnny Tillotson. Vee sings "All You Gotta Do Is Touch Me" and "The Night Has A Thousand Eyes".

- C'mon, Let's Live a Little (1967), Paramount Pictures, color, 85 minutes; director: David Butler; producers: John Herelandy, June Starr; screenplay: June Starr. - Jesse Crawford
