= List of Billboard Hot 100 top-ten singles in 1966 =

This is a list of singles that have peaked in the Top 10 of the Billboard Hot 100 during 1966.

The Beatles, The Lovin' Spoonful, and The Rolling Stones each had five top-ten hits in 1966, tying them for the most top-ten hits during the year.

== Top-ten singles ==
- (#) – 1966 Year-end top 10 single position and rank

Top ten entry date	Single	Artist(s)	Peak	Peak date	Weeks in top ten
Singles from 1965
December 25	"The Sound of Silence"	Simon & Garfunkel	1	January 1	5
December 25	"Ebb Tide"	The Righteous Brothers	5	January 8	4
Singles from 1966
January 1	"We Can Work It Out"	The Beatles	1	January 8	7
January 8	"She's Just My Style"	Gary Lewis & the Playboys	3	January 8	5
January 8	"Flowers on the Wall"	The Statler Brothers	4	January 8	2
January 8	"Five O'Clock World"	The Vogues	4	January 15	6
January 8	"Day Tripper"	The Beatles	5	January 22	3
January 15	"No Matter What Shape (Your Stomach's In)"	The T-Bones	3	February 5	6
January 15	"As Tears Go By"	The Rolling Stones	6	January 29	3
January 15	"The Men in My Little Girl's Life"	Mike Douglas	6	February 5	4
January 22	"A Must to Avoid"	Herman's Hermits	8	January 22	3
January 22	"You Didn't Have to Be So Nice"	The Lovin' Spoonful	10	January 22	1
January 29	"My Love"	Petula Clark	1	February 5	6
January 29	"Barbara Ann"	The Beach Boys	2	January 29	4
January 29	"Jenny Take a Ride"	Mitch Ryder and the Detroit Wheels	10	January 29	1
February 5	"Lightnin' Strikes"	Lou Christie	1	February 19	6
February 5	"Crying Time"	Ray Charles	6	February 19	3
February 12	"Uptight (Everything's Alright)"	Stevie Wonder	3	February 12	4
February 12	"My World Is Empty Without You"	The Supremes	5	February 19	4
February 12	"Don't Mess with Bill"	The Marvelettes	7	February 26	3
February 19	"These Boots Are Made for Walkin'" (#6)	Nancy Sinatra	1	February 26	7
February 19	"The Ballad of the Green Berets" (#10)	S/Sgt. Barry Sadler	1	March 5	9
February 26	"California Dreamin'" (#1)	The Mamas and the Papas	4	March 12	7
February 26	"Elusive Butterfly"	Bob Lind	5	March 12	5
February 26	"Working My Way Back to You"	The Four Seasons	9	March 5	2
March 5	"Listen People"	Herman's Hermits	3	March 12	4
March 12	"19th Nervous Breakdown"	The Rolling Stones	2	March 19	6
March 12	"Nowhere Man"	The Beatles	3	March 26	5
March 12	"Homeward Bound"	Simon & Garfunkel	5	March 26	4
March 12	"I Fought the Law"	The Bobby Fuller Four	9	March 12	2
March 19	"Daydream"	The Lovin' Spoonful	2	April 9	7
March 26	"(You're My) Soul and Inspiration"	The Righteous Brothers	1	April 9	8
April 2	"Bang Bang (My Baby Shot Me Down)"	Cher	2	April 23	6
April 2	"Sure Gonna Miss Her"	Gary Lewis & the Playboys	9	April 9	2
April 9	"Secret Agent Man"	Johnny Rivers	3	April 23	5
April 9	"I'm So Lonesome I Could Cry"	B. J. Thomas	8	April 9	3
April 16	"Good Lovin'"	The Young Rascals	1	April 30	7
April 16	"Kicks" (#9)	Paul Revere & the Raiders	4	May 14	6
April 16	"Time Won't Let Me"	The Outsiders	5	April 16	3
April 23	"Monday, Monday"	The Mamas and the Papas	1	May 7	8
April 23	"Sloop John B"	The Beach Boys	3	May 7	5
April 30	"Leaning on the Lamp Post"	Herman's Hermits	9	May 7	2
May 7	"Rainy Day Women ♯12 & 35"	Bob Dylan	2	May 21	5
May 7	"Gloria"	The Shadows of Knight	10	May 7	2
May 14	"When a Man Loves a Woman"	Percy Sledge	1	May 28	6
May 14	"How Does That Grab You, Darlin'?"	Nancy Sinatra	7	May 14	2
May 14	"Message to Michael"	Dionne Warwick	8	May 14	2
May 21	"A Groovy Kind of Love"	The Mindbenders	2	May 28	5
May 21	"Love Is Like an Itching in My Heart"	The Supremes	9	May 28	2
May 28	"Paint It, Black"	The Rolling Stones	1	June 11	7
May 28	"Did You Ever Have to Make Up Your Mind?"	The Lovin' Spoonful	2	June 11	6
May 28	"I Am a Rock"	Simon & Garfunkel	3	June 11	6
May 28	"It's a Man's Man's Man's World"	James Brown	8	June 4	3
June 4	"Green Grass"	Gary Lewis & The Playboys	8	June 18	3
June 4	"Strangers in the Night" (#8)	Frank Sinatra	1	July 2	7
June 11	"Barefootin'"	Robert Parker	7	June 18	4
June 18	"Red Rubber Ball"	The Cyrkle	2	July 9	6
June 18	"Cool Jerk"	The Capitols	7	July 2	4
June 25	"Paperback Writer"	The Beatles	1	June 25	5
June 25	"You Don't Have to Say You Love Me"	Dusty Springfield	4	July 16	5
June 25	"Sweet Talking Guy"	The Chiffons	10	June 25	1
July 2	"Hanky Panky"	Tommy James and the Shondells	1	July 16	6
July 9	"Wild Thing"	The Troggs	1	July 30	8
July 9	"Along Comes Mary"	The Association	7	July 16	2
July 9	"Little Girl"	Syndicate of Sound	8	July 9	2
July 16	"Li'l Red Riding Hood"	Sam the Sham and the Pharaohs	2	August 6	7
July 16	"Hungry"	Paul Revere & the Raiders	6	July 30	3
July 23	"The Pied Piper"	Crispian St. Peters	4	July 23	5
July 23	"I Saw Her Again"	The Mamas and the Papas	5	July 30	4
July 23	"Sweet Pea"	Tommy Roe	8	July 30	4
July 30	"Summer in the City"	The Lovin' Spoonful	1	August 13	7
July 30	"Mother's Little Helper"	The Rolling Stones	8	August 13	4
July 30	"Somewhere, My Love"	Ray Conniff	9	August 13	3
August 6	"They're Coming to Take Me Away, Ha-Haaa!"	Napoleon XIV	3	August 13	3
August 13	"Sunny"	Bobby Hebb	2	August 20	6
August 20	"Sunshine Superman"	Donovan	1	September 3	7
August 20	"See You in September"	The Happenings	3	August 27	5
August 20	"I Couldn't Live Without Your Love"	Petula Clark	9	August 20	2
August 27	"You Can't Hurry Love"	The Supremes	1	September 10	8
August 27	"Yellow Submarine"	The Beatles	2	September 17	6
August 27	"Summertime"	Billy Stewart	10	August 27	2
September 3	"Land of a Thousand Dances"	Wilson Pickett	6	September 10	3
September 3	"Working in the Coal Mine"	Lee Dorsey	8	September 3	2
September 3	"Blowin' in the Wind"	Stevie Wonder	9	September 3	1
September 10	"Bus Stop"	The Hollies	5	September 17	4
September 10	"Guantanamera"	The Sandpipers	9	September 17	2
September 17	"Cherish" (#7)	The Association	1	September 24	6
September 17	"Wouldn't It Be Nice"	The Beach Boys	8	September 17	2
September 24	"Reach Out I'll Be There" (#5)	Four Tops	1	October 15	7
September 24	"96 Tears" (#2)	? and the Mysterians	1	October 29	9
September 24	"Beauty Is Only Skin Deep"	The Temptations	3	October 1	3
September 24	"Black Is Black"	Los Bravos	4	October 1	3
October 1	"Cherry, Cherry"	Neil Diamond	6	October 15	3
October 8	"Last Train to Clarksville" (#4)	The Monkees	1	November 5	9
October 8	"Psychotic Reaction"	Count Five	5	October 15	3
October 8	"I've Got You Under My Skin"	The Four Seasons	9	October 15	2
October 15	"Walk Away Renée"	The Left Banke	5	October 29	4
October 15	"What Becomes of the Brokenhearted" (#3)	Jimmy Ruffin	7	October 29	4
October 22	"Poor Side of Town"	Johnny Rivers	1	November 12	7
October 22	"Dandy"	Herman's Hermits	5	November 5	4
October 22	"See See Rider"	The Animals	10	October 22	2
October 29	"Hooray for Hazel"	Tommy Roe	6	November 5	2
October 29	"Have You Seen Your Mother, Baby, Standing in the Shadow?"	The Rolling Stones	9	October 29	2
November 5	"If I Were a Carpenter"	Bobby Darin	8	November 5	3
November 12	"You Keep Me Hangin' On"	The Supremes	1	November 19	6
November 12	"Winchester Cathedral"	The New Vaudeville Band	1	December 3	10
November 12	"Good Vibrations"	The Beach Boys	1	December 10	7
November 12	"Devil with a Blue Dress On/Good Golly Miss Molly"	Mitch Ryder and the Detroit Wheels	4	November 26	7
November 12	"I'm Your Puppet"	James & Bobby Purify	6	November 26	4
November 19	"Rain on the Roof"	The Lovin' Spoonful	10	November 19	1
November 26	"Mellow Yellow"	Donovan	2	December 10	7
November 26	"Lady Godiva"	Peter and Gordon	6	December 10	3
November 26	"Born Free"	Roger Williams	7	December 17	4
December 10	"That's Life"	Frank Sinatra	4	December 24	6
December 10	"Stop Stop Stop"	The Hollies	7	December 10	1
December 10	"I'm Ready for Love"	Martha and the Vandellas	9	December 10	1
December 17	"I'm a Believer"	The Monkees	1	December 31	12
December 17	"Sugar Town"	Nancy Sinatra	5	December 31	6
December 17	"A Place in the Sun"	Stevie Wonder	9	December 24	3
December 24	"Snoopy vs. the Red Baron"	The Royal Guardsmen	2	December 31	8
December 24	"(I Know) I'm Losing You"	The Temptations	8	December 31	2

=== 1965 peaks ===
List of Billboard Hot 100 top ten singles in 1966 which peaked in 1965
Top ten entry date	Single	Artist(s)	Peak	Peak date	Weeks in top ten
November 13	"Let's Hang On!"	The Four Seasons	3	December 11	8
November 20	"Turn! Turn! Turn!"	The Byrds	1	December 4	8
November 27	"I Got You (I Feel Good)"	James Brown	3	December 18	7
December 4	"Over and Over"	The Dave Clark Five	1	December 25	6
December 18	"Fever"	The McCoys	7	December 25	3
December 18	"England Swings"	Roger Miller	8	December 18	3
December 18	"Make the World Go Away"	Eddy Arnold	6	December 25	3

=== 1967 peaks ===
List of Billboard Hot 100 top ten singles in 1966 which peaked in 1967
Top ten entry date	Single	Artist(s)	Peak	Peak date	Weeks in top ten
December 31	"Tell It Like It Is"	Aaron Neville	2	January 28	8
December 31	"Good Thing"	Paul Revere & the Raiders	4	January 14	6

== See also ==
- 1966 in music
- List of Billboard Hot 100 number ones of 1966
- Billboard Year-End Hot 100 singles of 1966
