= List of number-one singles of 1966 (Canada) =

This is a list of the weekly Canadian RPM magazine (Note: The magazine's weekly record charts were digitized by the AV Trust. The collection is archived by Library and Archives Canada here. The PDF text search does not work unless you have additional software installed. You must view each entry on the chart for a match.) number one Top Singles chart of 1966. (Note: A collection of all the .pdf files cited is available here.) (Note: † On 21 March 1966, the chart became the RPM 100, as expanded to the top 100 singles.)

Volume:Issue	Issue Date(s)	Song	Artist
4:19	3 January	"Flowers on the Wall"	Statler Brothers
4:20	10 January	"Five O'Clock World"	The Vogues
4:21	17 January	"No Matter What Shape (Your Stomach's In)"	The T-Bones
4:22	24 January	"We Can Work It Out"	The Beatles
4:23	31 January	"Yesterday Man"	Chris Andrews
4:24	7 February	"As Tears Go By"	The Rolling Stones
4:25	14 February	"My Love"	Petula Clark
4:26	21 February	"Lightnin' Strikes"	Lou Christie
5:1	28 February	"Michelle"	David and Jonathan
5:2	7 March	"These Boots Are Made for Walking"	Nancy Sinatra
5:3	14 March	"At the Scene"	Dave Clark 5
5:4	21 March	"Listen People"	Herman's Hermits (Note: RPM began the practice of keeping former #1 singles on the chart, dropping down their position from top rather than deleting the single from the chart.)
5:5	28 March	"Nowhere Man"	The Beatles
5:6	4 April	"Woman"	Peter & Gordon
5:7	11 April	"Magic Town"	The Vogues
5:8	18 April	"Daydream"	The Lovin' Spoonful
5:9	25 April	"Good Lovin'"	The Young Rascals
5:10	2 May	"Kicks"	Paul Revere & the Raiders
5:11	9 May	"Good Lovin'"	The Young Rascals
5:12	16 May	"Monday, Monday"	The Mamas & the Papas
5:13	23 May	"Monday, Monday"	The Mamas & the Papas
5:14	30 May	"Monday, Monday"	The Mamas & the Papas
5:15	6 June	"When a Man Loves a Woman"	Percy Sledge
5:16	13 June	"Paint It, Black"	The Rolling Stones
5:17	20 June	"Green Grass"	Gary Lewis
5:18	27 June	"Sweet Talkin' Guy"	The Chiffons
5:19	4 July	"Paperback Writer"	The Beatles
5:20	11 July	"Red Rubber Ball"	The Cyrkle
5:21	18 July	"The Pied Piper"	Crispian St. Peters
5:22	25 July	"Hanky Panky"	Tommy James and the Shondells
5:23	1 August	"Sweet Pea"	Tommy Roe
5:24	8 August	"I Saw Her Again"	The Mamas & the Papas
5:25	15 August	"Summer in the City"	The Lovin' Spoonful
5:26	22 August	"Summer in the City"	The Lovin' Spoonful
6:1	29 August	"See You in September"	The Happenings
6:2	5 September	"Bus Stop"	The Hollies
6:3	12 September	"Get Away"	Georgie Fame
6:4	19 September	"Yellow Submarine"/"Eleanor Rigby"	The Beatles
6:5	26 September	"Sunny Afternoon"	The Kinks
6:6	3 October	"Cherish"	The Association
6:7	10 October	"Black Is Black"	Los Bravos
6:8	17 October	"See See Rider"	Eric Burdon and The Animals
6:9	24 October	"See See Rider"	Eric Burdon and The Animals
6:10	31 October	"96 Tears"	Question Mark & the Mysterians
6:11	7 November	"Last Train to Clarksville"	The Monkees
6:12	14 November	"Dandy"	Herman's Hermits
6:13	21 November	"Poor Side of Town"	Johnny Rivers
6:14	28 November	"Winchester Cathedral"	New Vaudeville Band and Dana Rollin
6:15	5 December	"Winchester Cathedral"	New Vaudeville Band and Dana Rollin
6:16	12 December	"Lady Godiva"	Peter & Gordon
6:17	19 December	"Stop! Stop! Stop!"	The Hollies
6:18	26 December	"I'm a Believer"	The Monkees

== See also ==
- 1966 in music
- List of Billboard Hot 100 number ones of 1966 (United States)
- List of Cashbox Top 100 number-one singles of 1966
