= Billboard Year-End Hot 100 singles of 1966 =

Ranking of recorded music

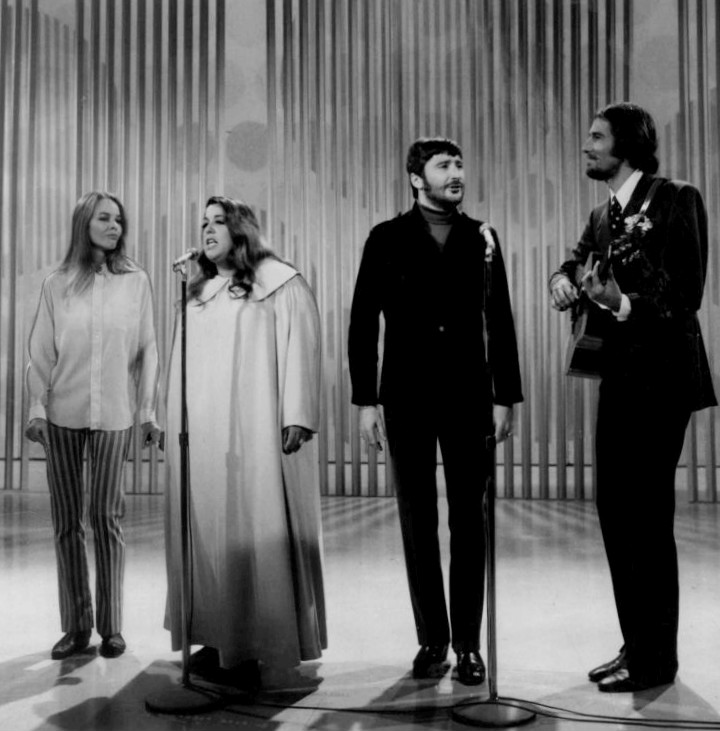
The Mamas & the Papas had two songs on the Year-End Hot 100, including "California Dreamin'", the number one song of 1966.

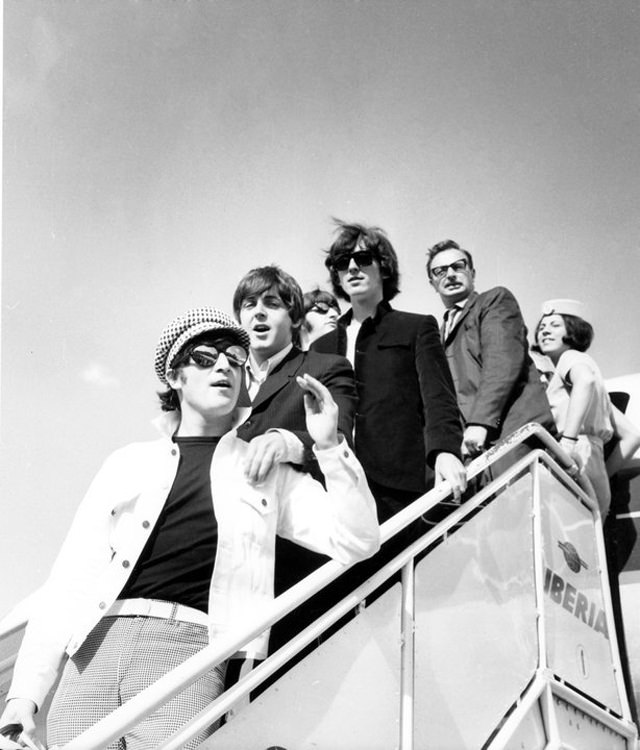
The Beatles had four songs on the Year-End Hot 100, the most of any artist in 1966.

This is a list of Billboard magazine's Top Hot 100 songs of 1966. The Top 100, as revealed in the year-end edition of Billboard dated December 24, 1966, is based on Hot 100 charts from the issue dates of January 1 through December 10, 1966.

No.	Title	Artist(s)
1	"California Dreamin'"	The Mamas & the Papas
2	"96 Tears"	? and the Mysterians
3	"What Becomes of the Brokenhearted"	Jimmy Ruffin
4	"Last Train to Clarksville"	The Monkees
5	"Reach Out I'll Be There"	Four Tops
6	"These Boots Are Made for Walkin'"	Nancy Sinatra
7	"Cherish"	The Association
8	"Strangers in the Night"	Frank Sinatra
9	"Kicks"	Paul Revere & the Raiders
10	"The Ballad of the Green Berets"	Barry Sadler
11	"Good Lovin'"	The Young Rascals
12	"(You're My) Soul and Inspiration"	The Righteous Brothers
13	"You Can't Hurry Love"	The Supremes
14	"Sunny"	Bobby Hebb
15	"See You in September"	The Happenings
16	"Li'l Red Riding Hood"	Sam the Sham and the Pharaohs
17	"Lightnin' Strikes"	Lou Christie
18	"Poor Side of Town"	Johnny Rivers
19	"Working in the Coal Mine"	Lee Dorsey
20	"A Groovy Kind of Love"	The Mindbenders
21	"You Don't Have to Say You Love Me"	Dusty Springfield
22	"Sunshine Superman"	Donovan
23	"Born a Woman"	Sandy Posey
24	"Monday, Monday"	The Mamas & the Papas
25	"Red Rubber Ball"	The Cyrkle
26	"Born Free"	Roger Williams
27	"Walk Away Renée"	The Left Banke
28	"Cool Jerk"	The Capitols
29	"B-A-B-Y"	Carla Thomas
30	"Hanky Panky"	Tommy James and the Shondells
31	"When a Man Loves a Woman"	Percy Sledge
32	"Time Won't Let Me"	The Outsiders
33	"Bus Stop"	The Hollies
34	"Paint It Black"	The Rolling Stones
35	"Summer in the City"	The Lovin' Spoonful
36	"I'm So Lonesome I Could Cry"	B. J. Thomas & the Triumphs
37	"My Love"	Petula Clark
38	"Daydream"	The Lovin' Spoonful
39	"Ain't Too Proud to Beg"	The Temptations
40	"Wild Thing"	The Troggs
41	"Elusive Butterfly"	Bob Lind
42	"I Am a Rock"	Simon & Garfunkel
43	"Dirty Water"	The Standells
44	"Hooray for Hazel"	Tommy Roe
45	"Crying Time"	Ray Charles
46	"Sweet Pea"	Tommy Roe
47	"Secret Agent Man"	Johnny Rivers
48	"Did You Ever Have to Make Up Your Mind?"	The Lovin' Spoonful
49	"We Can Work It Out"	The Beatles
50	"Homeward Bound"	Simon & Garfunkel
51	"Uptight (Everything's Alright)"	Stevie Wonder
52	"Bang Bang (My Baby Shot Me Down)"	Cher
53	"Sloop John B"	The Beach Boys
54	"19th Nervous Breakdown"	The Rolling Stones
55	"Wipe Out"	The Surfaris
56	"Psychotic Reaction"	Count Five
57	"Paperback Writer"	The Beatles
58	"Beauty Is Only Skin Deep"	The Temptations
59	"No Matter What Shape (Your Stomach's In)"	The T-Bones
60	"Barefootin'"	Robert Parker
61	"Just Like Me"	Paul Revere & the Raiders
62	"Love Makes the World Go Round"	Deon Jackson
63	"The Pied Piper"	Crispian St. Peters
64	"Somewhere My Love"	Ray Conniff Singers
65	"Almost Persuaded"	David Houston
66	"If I Were a Carpenter"	Bobby Darin
67	"Don't Mess with Bill"	The Marvelettes
68	"Cherry, Cherry"	Neil Diamond
69	"Message to Michael"	Dionne Warwick
70	"Love Is a Hurtin' Thing"	Lou Rawls
71	"Gloria"	The Shadows of Knight
72	"My World Is Empty Without You"	The Supremes
73	"Barbara Ann"	The Beach Boys
74	"Rainy Day Women #12 & 35"	Bob Dylan
75	"Guantanamera"	The Sandpipers
76	"I'm Your Puppet"	James & Bobby Purify
77	"Land of 1000 Dances"	Wilson Pickett
78	"Oh How Happy"	The Shades of Blue
79	"Woman"	Peter and Gordon
80	"You Baby"	The Turtles
81	"Sweet Talkin' Guy"	The Chiffons
82	"Five O'Clock World"	The Vogues
83	"Black Is Black"	Los Bravos
84	"Nowhere Man"	The Beatles
85	"Dandy"	Herman's Hermits
86	"Baby Scratch My Back"	Slim Harpo
87	"She's Just My Style"	Gary Lewis & the Playboys
88	"The More I See You"	Chris Montez
89	"I Fought the Law"	The Bobby Fuller Four
90	"Yellow Submarine"	The Beatles
91	"Hungry"	Paul Revere & the Raiders
92	"Zorba the Greek"	Herb Alpert and the Tijuana Brass
93	"Shapes of Things"	The Yardbirds
94	"Along Comes Mary"	The Association
95	"634-5789 (Soulsville, U.S.A.)"	Wilson Pickett
96	"Devil with a Blue Dress On/Good Golly, Miss Molly"	Mitch Ryder & The Detroit Wheels
97	"Wouldn't It Be Nice"	The Beach Boys
98	"This Old Heart of Mine"	The Isley Brothers
99	"Green Grass"	Gary Lewis & the Playboys
100	"A Well Respected Man"	The Kinks

== See also ==
- 1966 in music
- List of Billboard Hot 100 number-one singles of 1966
- List of Billboard Hot 100 top-ten singles in 1966
