= Sweet Pea =

Sweet pea is a flowering plant.

Sweet Pea may refer to:

== Fictional characters ==
- Swee'Pea, a Popeye cartoon character
- Sweet Pea, a character from the film Sucker Punch
- Sweetpea, a character in The Secret Life of Pets series of films
- Sweetpea Sue, a character in Jim Henson's Pajanimals
- Sweetpea Beauty, a character in the VeggieTales princess episode of the same name

== Nicknames ==
- Sweet Pea, nickname for boxer Pernell Whitaker
- Sweet Pea Atkinson, vocalist, former member of pop group Was (Not Was)

== Music ==
- Sweet Pea (album), by Tommy Roe (1966)
- "Sweet Pea" (song), a 1966 song by singer and songwriter Tommy Roe
- "Sweet Pea", a song by singer Amos Lee from his 2006 album Supply and Demand

== Film and television ==
- Sweet Pea (film), international release title of the Italian film Piso pisello
- Sweet Pea, a short film by Traci Lords
- Sweetpea (TV series), a British dark comedy

== See also ==
- Sweet P, a character in the animated series Adventure Time
- Glycosuria, a symptom of diabetes
