= 20 Golden Greats (Diana Ross album) =

Greatest hits album by Diana Ross
- Released: November 2, 1979
- Recorded: 1970–1979
- Genre: Pop; soul; disco
- Length: 67:28
- Label: Tamla Motown

Diana Ross chronology
The Boss (1979)	20 Golden Greats (1979)	Diana (1980)

20 Golden Greats is a compilation album by Diana Ross, released on the Motown label in Europe in 1979. Although Ross had scored 22 single hits in the UK since leaving the Supremes in 1970, the album only contained the 18 solo tracks that had charted for Ross in the UK, together with the two tracks that had charted in partnership with Marvin Gaye. Both the hit singles "Ease On down the Road" (with Michael Jackson) and "Pops, We Love You" (with Gaye, Smokey Robinson and Stevie Wonder) were excluded in favor of solo hits. By the time the album was released, Ross had already scored her 23rd post-Supremes hit single (her 19th solo) with "It's My House", which was thus not included. The album was released just two years after the 20 Golden Greats compilation featuring 18 of her 21 UK hits with the Supremes. The album was certified Platinum in the UK for sales in excess of 300,000 copies. By February 1980, the album had sold 990,000 units in the UK alone.

The album was released for the international market and became the singer's best charting album in the UK since another greatest hits collection (released in 1976) also peaked at number 2. Due to the large number of tracks included and the time limitations of the vinyl album format the running time of several titles were changed and were either slightly edited or had fade-out ends. The 20 Golden Greats album remains unreleased on CD.

== Track listing ==
Side A
No.	Title	Writer(s)	Original album, year	Length
1.	"Theme from Mahogany (Do You Know Where You're Going To)"	Michael Masser, Gerry Goffin	Mahogany – 1975; Diana Ross – 1976	3:21
2.	"Touch Me in the Morning"	Masser, Ron Miller	Touch Me in the Morning – 1973	3:59
3.	"Stop, Look, Listen (To Your Heart)" (duet with Marvin Gaye)	T. Bell, L. Creed	Diana & Marvin – 1973	2:51
4.	"No One Gets the Prize"	Nickolas Ashford, Valerie Simpson	The Boss – 1979	3:49
5.	"Ain't No Mountain High Enough"	Ashford & Simpson	Diana Ross – 1970	3:33
6.	"Love Hangover"	Marilyn McLeod, Pam Sawyer	Diana Ross – 1976	3:44
7.	"All of My Life"	Michael Randall	Touch Me in the Morning – 1973	3:21
8.	"I'm Still Waiting"	Richards	Everything Is Everything – 1970	3:32
9.	"Lovin', Livin' and Givin'"	Kenny Stover, Pam Davis	Thank God It's Friday – 1978; Ross – 1978 (remix)	3:48
10.	"The Boss"	Ashford & Simpson	The Boss – 1979	3:41

Side B
No.	Title	Writer(s)	Original album, year	Length
1.	"You Are Everything" (duet with Marvin Gaye)	Bell, Creed	Diana & Marvin – 1973	2:50
2.	"Sorry Doesn't Always Make It Right"	Michael Masser	Non-album single – 1975; Ross – 1978 (remix)	3:30
3.	"Last Time I Saw Him"	Masser, Pam Sawyer	Last Time I Saw Him – 1973	2:48
4.	"Love Me"	Baird, Fekaris, Zesses	Last Time I Saw Him – 1973	2:55
5.	"Remember Me"	Ashford & Simpson	Surrender – 1971	3:29
6.	"Surrender"	Ashford & Simpson	Surrender – 1971	2:50
7.	"Reach Out and Touch (Somebody's Hand)"	Ashford & Simpson	Diana Ross – 1970	3:04
8.	"Gettin' Ready for Love"	Golde, Snow	Baby It's Me – 1977	2:50
9.	"Doobedood'ndoobe, Doobedood'ndoobe, Doobedood'ndoo"	Richards	Everything Is Everything – 1970	4:10
10.	"I Thought It Took a Little Time (But Today I Fell in Love)"	Masser, Pam Sawyer	Diana Ross – 1976	3:23

== Charts ==
Chart (1979)	Peak position
New Zealand Albums (RMNZ)	6
UK Albums (OCC)	2

== Certifications ==
Region	Certification	Certified units/sales
United Kingdom (BPI)	Platinum	990,000
