= Supertonic: Mixes =

Remix album by Diana Ross
- Released: May 29, 2020
- Length: 35:54
- Labels: Universal; Motown
- Producer: Diana Ross

Diana Ross chronology
Wonderful Christmas Time (2018)	Supertonic: Mixes (2020)	Thank You (2021)

Singles from Supertonic: Mixes
- 1. "Ain't No Mountain High Enough" Released: December 17, 2017; 2. "I'm Coming Out / Upside Down" Released: August 10, 2018; 3. "The Boss" Released: March 26, 2019; 4. "Love Hangover" Released: May 8, 2020

Professional ratings
Review scores
Source	Rating
AllMusic	3/5 stars
PopMatters	7/10

Supertonic: Mixes is the second remix album by American singer Diana Ross, released on May 29, 2020, by Universal Music and Motown Records. The album was produced by Diana Ross and remixed by Eric Kupper.

Four tracks from the album, including "Ain't No Mountain High Enough", "I'm Coming Out / Upside Down", "The Boss", and "Love Hangover", were released as singles, and all of them topped the Billboard Dance Club Songs chart.

== Track listing ==
No.	Title	Writer(s)	Length
1.	"I'm Coming Out / Upside Down"	Nile Rodgers; Bernard Edwards	3:06
2.	"Love Hangover"	Marilyn McLeod; Pamela Sawyer	3:48
3.	"The Boss"	Nickolas Ashford; Valerie Simpson	3:41
4.	"Surrender"	Ashford; Simpson	3:07
5.	"Ain't No Mountain High Enough"	Ashford; Simpson	4:05
6.	"No One Gets the Prize"	Ashford; Simpson	5:20
7.	"It's My House"	Ashford; Simpson	4:41
8.	"Touch Me in the Morning"	Ron Miller; Michael Masser	4:20
9.	"Remember Me"	Ashford; Simpson	3:43
Total length:			35:54

== Charts ==
Chart performance for Supertonic: Mixes
Chart (2020)	Peak position
US Top Current Album Sales (Billboard)	66

== Release history ==
Release dates and formats for Supertonic: Mixes
Region	Date	Format	Label	Ref.
Various	May 29, 2020	Digital download; streaming	Universal; Motown	
Various	July 24, 2020	CD; vinyl	Universal; Motown	
