= Tommy Roe discography =

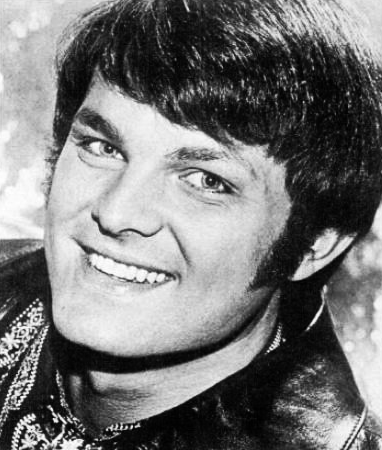
- Tommy Roe in 1970
- Studio albums: 13
- Compilation albums: 5
- Singles: 55

Thomas David "Tommy" Roe (born May 9, 1942) is an American singer-songwriter who had several chart topping songs in multiple countries during the 1960s including Sheila and Sweet Pea. He recorded 13 studio albums and 55 singles from 1960 to 1987.

== Albums ==
=== Studio albums ===
Year	Album	Chart Positions	
Year	Album	US	CAN
1962	Sheila	110	—
1963	Something for Everybody	—	—
1964	Everybody Likes Tommy Roe	—	—
1965	Ballads and Beat	—	—
1966	Sweet Pea	94	—
1967	Phantasy	—	—
1967	It's Now Winter's Day	159	—
1969	Dizzy	25	7
1970	We Can Make Music	134	—
1971	Beginnings	—	—
1976	Energy	—	—
1977	Full Bloom	—	—
2012	Devil's Soul Pile	—	—
"—" denotes a recording that did not chart or was not released in that territory.

=== Compilation albums ===
Year	Album	Chart Positions	
Year	Album	US	CAN
1970	12 in a Roe: A Collection of Tommy Roe's Greatest Hits	21	21
1972	16 Greatest Hits	—	—
1990	The Best Of Tommy Roe: Yesterday, Today and Tomorrow	—	—
1993	Tommy Roe's Greatest Hits	—	—
1998	20 Greatest Hits	—	—
2002	Greatest Hits	—	—
"—" denotes a recording that did not chart or was not released in that territory.

== Singles ==
Year	Single (A-side, B-side) Both sides from same album except where indicated	UK	AU	CAN	U.S.	U.S. Country	GER	RIAA Certification	Album
1960	"Caveman" b/w "I Got a Girl"	–	–	–	–	–	–	–	Whirling with Tommy Roe and Al Tornello
1960	"Sheila" b/w "Pretty Girl" (Non-album track, and not the same recording as below)	–	–	–	–	–	–	–	Whirling with Tommy Roe and Al Tornello
1960	"I Got a Girl" b/w "Pretty Girl"	–	–	–	–	–	–	–	Whirling with Tommy Roe and Al Tornello
1962	"Sheila" b/w "Save Your Kisses" (Non-album track)	3	1	1	1	–	9	Gold	Sheila
1962	"Susie Darlin'" /	37	13	21	35	–	–	–	Sheila
1962	"Piddle De Pat"	–	13	21	–	–	–	–	Sheila
1962	"Rainbow" /	–	82	–	–	–	–	–	Non-album tracks
1962	"Town Crier"	–	82	–	–	–	–	–	Non-album tracks
1963	"Gonna Take a Chance" b/w "Don't Cry Donna"	–	78	–	–	–	–	–	Non-album tracks
1963	"Everybody" b/w "Sorry I'm Late Lisa" (Non-album track)	9	18	3	3	–	–	–	Sweet Pea
1963	"The Folk Singer" b/w "Count on Me" (Non-album track)	4	20	34	84	–	–	–	Sweet Pea
1963	"Kiss and Run" b/w "What Makes the Blues Want to Pick on Me"	–	77	–	–	–	–	–	Non-album tracks
1964	"Carol" b/w "Be a Good Little Girl" (Non-album track)	–	16	–	61	–	–	–	12 in a Roe: A Collection of Tommy Roe's Greatest Hits
1964	"Come On" b/w "There Will Be Better Years"	–	42	23	36	–	–	–	Non-album tracks
1964	"A Wild Water Skiing Weekend" b/w "Dance with Henry"	–	–	–	–	–	–	–	Non-album tracks
1964	"Oh So Right" b/w "I Think I Love You"	–	–	–	–	–	–	–	Non-album tracks
1964	"Party Girl" b/w "Oh How I Could Love You" (Non-album track)	–	7	–	85	–	–	–	Sweet Pea
1965	"Diane from Manchester Square" /	–	84	–	–	–	–	–	Non-album tracks
1965	"Love Me, Love Me"	–	84	–	–	–	–	–	Non-album tracks
1965	"Fourteen Pairs of Shoes" b/w "Combo Music"	–	–	–	–	–	–	–	Non-album tracks
1965	"I'm a Rambler, I'm a Gambler" b/w "The Gunfighter"	–	–	–	–	–	–	–	Non-album tracks
1965	"Wish You Didn't Have to Go" b/w "I Keep Remembering (Things I Forgot)"	–	–	–	–	–	–	–	Non-album tracks
1965	"Doesn't Anybody Know My Name (Two-Ten, Six-Eighteen)" b/w "Everytime a Bluebird Cries"	–	–	–	–	–	–	–	Non-album tracks
1966	"Sweet Pea" b/w "Much More Love" (Non-album track)	–	7	1	8	–	–	Gold	Sweet Pea
1966	"Hooray for Hazel" b/w "Need Your Love" (Non-album track)	–	28	2	6	–	–	–	Sweet Pea
1967	"It's Now Winter's Day" b/w "Kick Me Charlie" (from Sweet Pea)	–	–	12	23	–	–	–	It's Now Winter's Day
1967	"Sweet Sounds" b/w "Moon Talk"	–	–	–	–	–	–	–	It's Now Winter's Day
1967	"Sing Along with Me" b/w "Nightime"	–	–	–	91	–	–	–	It's Now Winter's Day
1967	"Little Miss Sunshine" b/w "The You I Need"	–	–	–	99	–	–	–	Phantasy
1967	"Melancholy Mood" b/w "Paisley Dreams"	–	–	95	–	–	–	–	Phantasy
1968	"Dottie I Like It" b/w "Soft Words"	–	–	85	–	–	–	–	Non-album tracks
1968	"Sugar Cane" b/w "An Oldie But a Goodie"	–	–	–	–	–	–	–	Non-album tracks
1969	"Dizzy" b/w "The You I Need" (from Phantasy)	1	2	1	1	–	4	Gold	Dizzy
1969	"Heather Honey" b/w "Money Is My Pay"	24	9	12	29	–	23	–	Dizzy
1969	"Jack and Jill" b/w "Tip Toe Tina" (Non-album track)	–	27	38	53	–	–	–	12 in a Roe: A Collection of Tommy Roe's Greatest Hits
1970	"Jam Up and Jelly Tight" b/w "Moontalk" (Non-album track)	–	5	5	8	–	–	Gold	12 in a Roe: A Collection of Tommy Roe's Greatest Hits
1970	"Pearl" b/w "A Dollar's Worth of Pennies" (from Dizzy)	–	60	57	50	–	–	–	We Can Make Music
1970	"Stir It Up and Serve It" b/w "Firefly"	–	69	28	50	–	–	–	We Can Make Music
1970	"We Can Make Music" b/w "Gotta Keep Rolling Along" (from Dizzy)	–	87	26	49	–	–	–	We Can Make Music
1970	"Brush a Little Sunshine" b/w "King of Fools"	–	–	87	–	–	–	–	We Can Make Music
1971	"Little Miss Goodie Two Shoes" b/w "Traffic Jam" (from We Can Make Music)	–	–	–	–	–	–	–	Non-album tracks
1971	"Pistol Legged Mama" b/w "King of Fools" (from We Can Make Music)	–	–	–	–	–	–	–	Non-album tracks
1971	"Stagger Lee" b/w "Back Streets and Alleys"	–	92	13	25	–	–	–	Beginnings
1972	"Sarah My Love" b/w "Chewing on Sugarcane"	–	–	–	–	–	–	–	Non-album tracks
1972	"Mean Little Woman, Rosalie" / >b/w "Skyline"	–	–	–	92	–	–	–	Non-album tracks
1973	"Working Class Hero"	–	–	79	97	73	–	–	Non-album tracks
1973	"Working Class Hero" (see above) b/w "Sun in My Eyes"	–	–	–	–	–	–	–	Non-album tracks
1975	"Glitter and Gleam" b/w "Bad News"	–	–	–	–	–	–	–	Energy
1975	"Rita and Her Band" b/w "Snowing Me Under"	–	–	–	–	–	–	–	Non-album tracks
1976	"Slow Dancing" b/w "Burn on Love Light"	–	–	–	–	–	–	–	Energy
1976	"Everybody" b/w "Energy"	–	–	–	–	–	–	–	Energy
1976	"Early in the Morning" b/w "Bad News" (from Energy)	–	–	–	–	–	–	–	Non-album track
1977	"Your Love Will See Me Through" b/w "Working Class Hero"	–	–	–	–	–	–	–	Full Bloom
1978	"Love the Way You Love Me Up" b/w "Dreamin' Again" (first pressings) "Just Look at Me" (later pressings)	–	–	–	–	–	–	–	Non-album tracks
1979	"Massachusetts" b/w "Just Look at Me"	–	–	–	–	77	–	–	Non-album tracks
1979	"You Better Move On" b/w "Just Look at Me"	–	–	–	–	70	–	–	Non-album tracks
1980	"Charlie, I Love Your Wife" b/w "There's No Sun on Sunset Blvd."	–	–	–	–	87	–	–	Non-album tracks
1985	"Some Such Foolishness" b/w "Barbara Lou"	–	–	–	–	57	–	–	Non-album tracks
1986	"Radio Romance" b/w "Barbara Lou"	–	–	–	–	51	–	–	Non-album tracks
1986	"Let's Be Fools Like That Again" b/w "Barbara Lou"	–	–	–	–	38	–	–	Non-album tracks
1987	"Back When It Really Mattered"	–	–	–	–	67	–	–	Non-album tracks
