= List of Cash Box Top 100 number-one singles of 1966 =

These are the number-one singles of 1966 according to the Top 100 Singles chart in Cashbox magazine

Issue date	Song	Artist
January 1	We Can Work It Out	The Beatles
January 8	We Can Work It Out	The Beatles
January 15	We Can Work It Out	The Beatles
January 22	We Can Work It Out	The Beatles
January 29	The Sound of Silence	Simon & Garfunkel
February 5	Barbara Ann	The Beach Boys
February 12	Lightnin' Strikes	Lou Christie
February 19	Lightnin' Strikes	Lou Christie
February 26	These Boots Are Made for Walkin'	Nancy Sinatra
March 5	The Ballad of the Green Berets	SSgt. Barry Sadler
March 12	The Ballad of the Green Berets	SSgt. Barry Sadler
March 19	The Ballad of the Green Berets	SSgt. Barry Sadler
March 26	The Ballad of the Green Berets	SSgt. Barry Sadler
April 2	19th Nervous Breakdown	The Rolling Stones
April 9	Daydream	The Lovin' Spoonful
April 16	(You're My) Soul and Inspiration	The Righteous Brothers
April 23	(You're My) Soul and Inspiration	The Righteous Brothers
April 30	Good Lovin'	The Young Rascals
May 7	Monday, Monday	The Mamas & the Papas
May 14	Monday, Monday	The Mamas & the Papas
May 21	Monday, Monday	The Mamas & the Papas
May 28	When a Man Loves a Woman	Percy Sledge
June 4	A Groovy Kind of Love	The Mindbenders
June 11	Paint It, Black	The Rolling Stones
June 18	Strangers in the Night	Frank Sinatra
June 25	Paperback Writer	The Beatles
July 2	Paperback Writer	The Beatles
July 9	Hanky Panky	Tommy James and the Shondells
July 16	Hanky Panky	Tommy James and the Shondells
July 23	Wild Thing	The Troggs
July 30	They're Coming to Take Me Away, Ha-Haaa!	Napoleon XIV
August 6	Lil' Red Riding Hood	Sam the Sham & the Pharaohs
August 13	Summer in the City	The Lovin' Spoonful
August 20	Summer in the City	The Lovin' Spoonful
August 27	Sunny	Bobby Hebb
September 3	Sunshine Superman	Donovan
September 10	Yellow Submarine	The Beatles
September 17	You Can't Hurry Love	The Supremes
September 24	Cherish	The Association
October 1	Cherish	The Association
October 8	Cherish	The Association
October 15	Reach Out I'll Be There	The Four Tops
October 22	96 Tears	Question Mark & the Mysterians
October 29	Last Train to Clarksville	The Monkees
November 5	Last Train to Clarksville	The Monkees
November 12	Poor Side of Town	Johnny Rivers
November 19	Good Vibrations	The Beach Boys
November 26	Winchester Cathedral	The New Vaudeville Band
December 3	You Keep Me Hangin' On	The Supremes
December 10	Winchester Cathedral	The New Vaudeville Band
December 17	Winchester Cathedral	The New Vaudeville Band
December 24	I'm a Believer	The Monkees
December 31	I'm a Believer	The Monkees

== See also ==
- 1966 in music
- List of Hot 100 number-one singles of 1966 (U.S.)
