= Trouble in the Jungle =

Trouble In The Jungle

Studio album by Teenage Head
- Released: 1986
- Genre: Punk rock; new wave
- Length: 35:38
- Label: Warpt Records
- Producer: Dave DesRoches & Gord Lewis

Teenage Head chronology
Endless Party (1984)	Trouble In The Jungle (1986)	Electric Guitar (1988)

Trouble In The Jungle is the sixth release by Teenage Head and their fourth full-length studio album. It was issued in 1986 by Warpt Records as catalogue number WR-924 and distributed by ARC Sound Company in Canada. It was available on LP and cassette. Singer Frankie Venom would leave the band after this album was released but returned in 1989. This was also the last recording to feature original drummer Nick Stipanitz who is listed in the credits as an additional musician. His replacement Mark Lockerbie is featured in the "Frantic Romantic" video. "Frantic Romantic" was originally released as a 7" vinyl single by Warpt/Ahed Records in 1985 with non album track "Get Down" on the B Side. It was reissued in 1986 by Warpt with "I Can't Pretend" on the B Side. Trouser Press espoused that Teenage Head reclaimed their "sense of fun on the nifty Trouble in the Jungle".

== Track listing ==
Side A
No.	Title	Writer(s)	Length
1.	"Frantic Romantic"	Des DesRoches, Gord Lewis, Frank Kerr	2:59
2.	"Let Her Dance"	Bobby Fuller	1:46
3.	"Drive-In"	Brian Wilson	3:34
4.	"Save Your Love"	Des DesRoches, Gord Lewis, Frank Kerr	4:43
5.	"I Can't Pretend"	Robin Wills	2:43
6.	"Weekend"	Bill Post, Doree Post	1:57

Side B
No.	Title	Writer(s)	Length
1.	"Splatter Man"	Des DesRoches, Gord Lewis, Frank Kerr	4:52
2.	"Jam Up and Jelly Tight"	Tommy Roe, Freddy Weller	1:58
3.	"Parasite"	Gord Lewis	3:38
4.	"Teenage Heaven"	Eddie Cochrane, Jerry Capehart	2:00
5.	"Sloppy Drunk"	Jimmy Rogers, James A. Lane	3:01
6.	"I Need Your Love Tonight"	Sid Wayne, Bix Reichner	1:48
7.	"Little Sister"	Doc Pomus, Mort Shuman	3:01

== Personnel ==
Teenage Head

- Frankie Venom (Kerr) - vocals
- Gordie "Lazy Legs" Lewis - guitar
- Dave Rave (DesRoches) - guitar
- Steve Marshall (Mahon) - bass

Additional musicians

- Nick Stipanitz - drums
- Tim Gibbons - harmonica
- Ed Roth - DX7 & Oberheim
- The Touch - guitar

Production Credits

- Produced by Dave DesRoches & Gord Lewis
- Recorded at Bob and Dan Lanois' Studio; Hamilton, Ontario, Canada
- Engineered by Dave Bottrill
