= Diana! =

Diana! (Original TV Soundtrack)

Soundtrack album by Diana Ross
- Released: March 29, 1971
- Recorded: 1970
- Genre: Soul
- Length: 39:50
- Label: Motown
- Producer: none given

Diana Ross chronology
Everything Is Everything (1970)	Diana! (Original TV Soundtrack) (1971)	Surrender (1971)

Professional ratings
Review scores
Source	Rating
Allmusic	3/5 stars

Diana! is the first solo television special of American singer Diana Ross and aired on ABC on April 18, 1971. The special was choreographed by David Winters of West Side Story fame, who at that time choreographed all of Ross' stage and television shows. The special featured performances by The Jackson 5, and also included Jackson 5 lead singer Michael Jackson's solo debut. Michael Jackson performed Frank Sinatra's "It Was a Very Good Year", which drew laughter as its adult-themed lyrics were changed to fit his age. Other guests included Danny Thomas and Bill Cosby, who would be featured on a similar television special by the Jackson 5 (Goin' Back to Indiana) a few months later.

Since this was right at the beginning of her solo career, she took the opportunity to promote the two hits from her debut, the gold audience participant "Reach Out and Touch (Somebody's Hand)" and the number 1 song "Ain't No Mountain High Enough". She also performed a cover of The Carpenters "(They Long to Be) Close to You" and the top-20 gold single "Remember Me" released that previous December 1970 included on her forthcoming album "Surrender" to be released later that summer. (Though she performed "Reach Out and Touch (Somebody's Hand)" on the special, it was not included on the soundtrack).

The television special, and its subsequent soundtrack, was a Nielsen ratings winner, hitting the top 20 (number 17) of shows that week and garnering Emmy nominations for Ross and Bob Mackie and in technical categories.

== Track listing ==
1. "Intro"
2. "Don't Rain on My Parade"
3. "Jackson 5 Medley" ("Mama's Pearl"/"Walk On By"/"The Love You Save")
4. "(They Long to Be) Close to You"
5. "Bill Cosby Segment"
6. "Love Story" (with Bill Cosby)
7. "Remember Me"
8. "Jackson 5 Medley" ("I'll Be There"/"Feelin' Alright")
9. "Danny Thomas Segment"
10. "Ain't No Mountain High Enough"
11. "Call Me"

== Charts ==
=== Weekly charts ===
Chart performance for Diana!
Chart (1971)	Peak position
Canada Top Albums/CDs (RPM)	40
UK Albums (Official Charts)	43
US Billboard 200	46
US Top R&B/Hip-Hop Albums (Billboard)	3
US Cashbox Top Albums	30

=== Year-end charts ===
Chart (1971)	Position
US Top R&B/Hip-Hop Albums (Billboard)	31
