= List of Billboard Hot 100 number ones of 1966 =

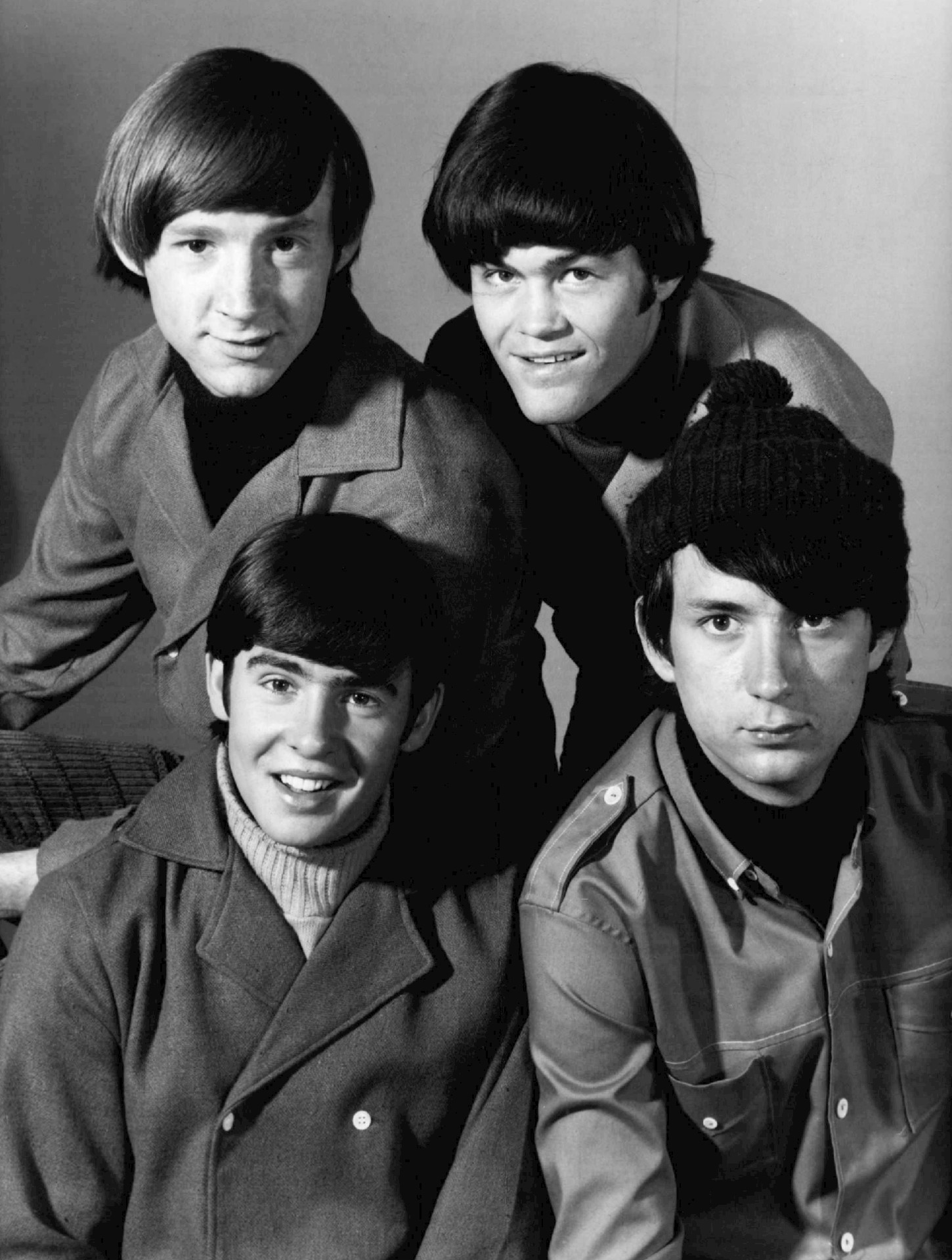
The Monkees had two number ones in 1966.

The Billboard Hot 100 is a chart published since August 1958 by Billboard magazine which ranks the best-performing singles in the United States. In 1966, it was compiled based on a combination of sales and airplay data sourced from surveys of retail outlets and playlists submitted by radio stations, respectively, and 27 different singles spent time at number one.

In the issue of Billboard dated January 1, Simon & Garfunkel reached number one with "The Sound of Silence", displacing the final chart-topper of 1965, "Over and Over" by the Dave Clark Five. It was the first number one for the duo, who had broken up following the commercial failure in 1964 of their debut album Wednesday Morning, 3 A.M., on which the track appeared. In 1965, however, reacting to the growing popularity of folk rock music, Tom Wilson, who had produced the album, created a new mix of the song featuring additional musicians to give more of a folk rock feel. After it topped the Hot 100, the duo reunited and were extremely successful before breaking up again in 1970. During February and March 1966, three more acts reached number one for the first time: Lou Christie, Nancy Sinatra, and SSgt. Barry Sadler. Sadler was a serving member of the United States Army; his song "The Ballad of the Green Berets" honored the military, unusual in an era when many musicians were writing protest songs which opposed United States involvement in the Vietnam War. It spent five weeks atop the chart, the year's longest run at number one, but was one of only two Hot 100 entries which Sadler achieved.

Later in the year, the Young Rascals, the Mamas & the Papas, Percy Sledge, Tommy James and the Shondells, the Troggs, the Lovin' Spoonful, Donovan, the Association, ? and the Mysterians, Johnny Rivers, and the New Vaudeville Band all gained their first number ones. Frank Sinatra topped the Hot 100 for the first time in July with "Strangers in the Night"; the veteran crooner, who was experiencing a career resurgence at the age of 50, had previously achieved number ones on the separate sales and airplay charts which Billboard published before the launch of the consolidated listing in 1958. In November, the Monkees gained their first number one with "Last Train to Clarksville". It was the debut single for the band, which had been put together for the NBC TV comedy series The Monkees, which began airing in September 1966. The group achieved its second number one with "I'm a Believer" in December, joining the Beatles and the Supremes as the only acts to have two chart-toppers in 1966. Several of the year's number ones have been ranked among the greatest pop songs of all time. In 2004, Rolling Stone magazine placed "Good Vibrations" by the Beach Boys at number 6 in its list of the 500 Greatest Songs of All Time, and both "Paint It Black" by the Rolling Stones and "The Sound of Silence" also appeared in the top 200.

== Chart history ==
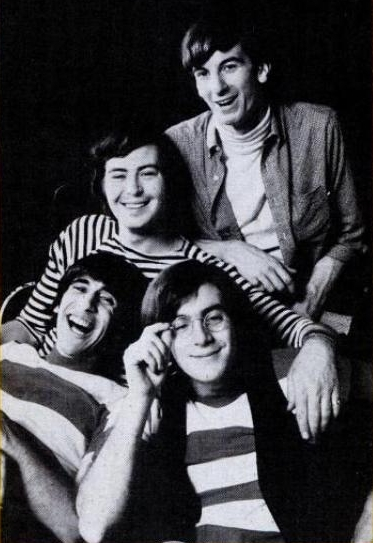
The Lovin' Spoonful topped the Hot 100 with "Summer in the City".

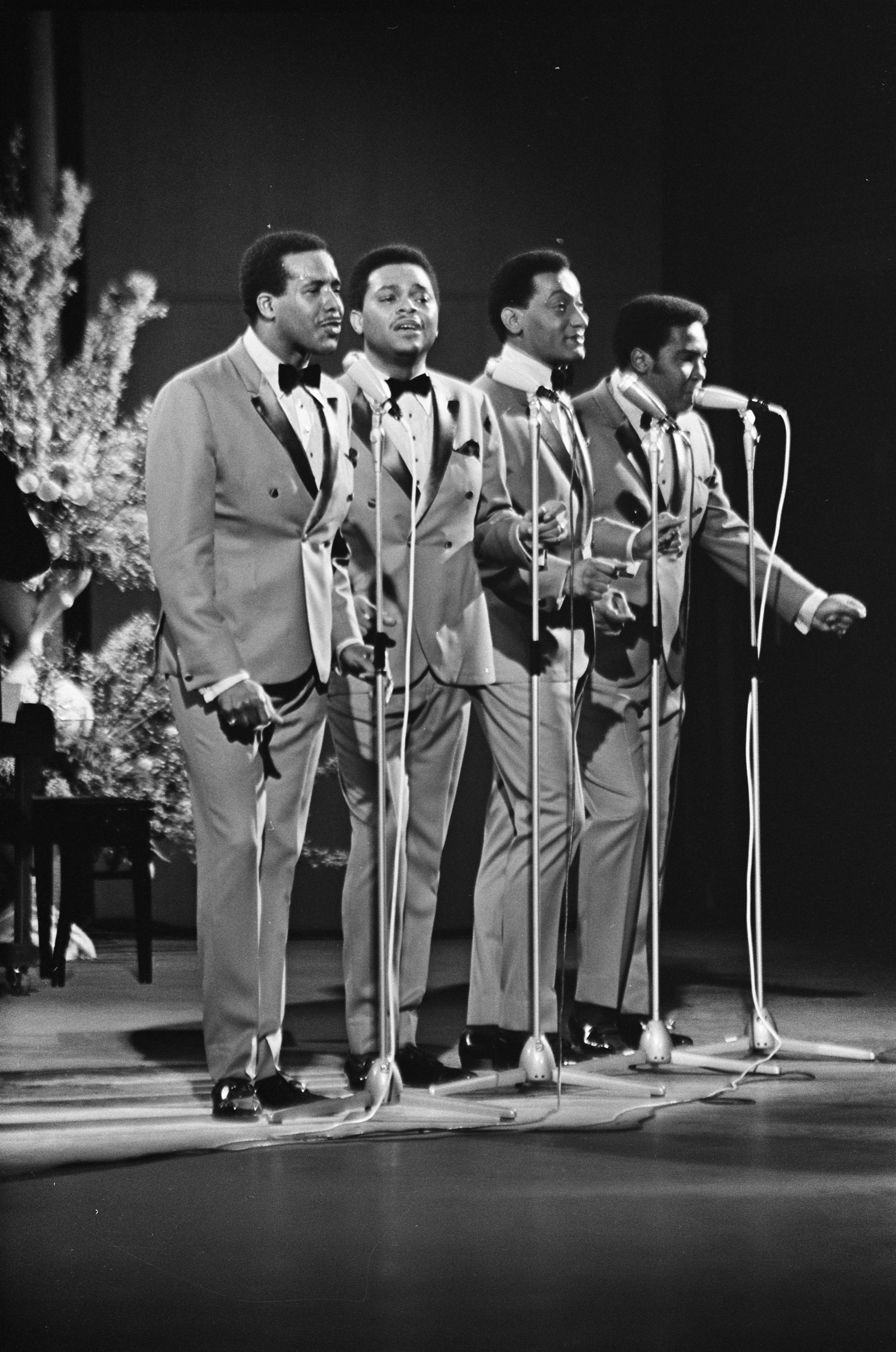
"Reach Out I'll Be There" was a chart-topper for the Four Tops.

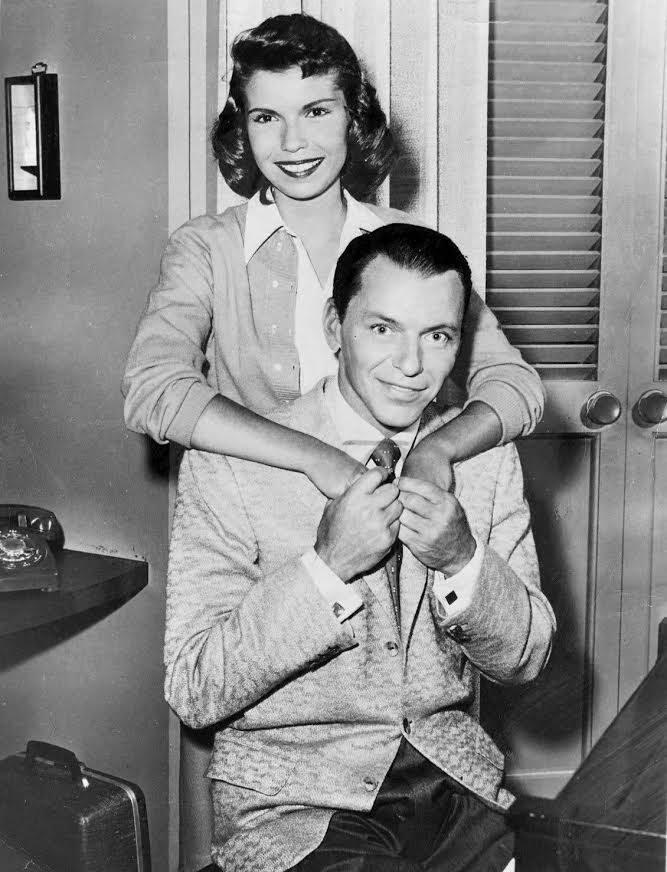
Nancy Sinatra gained her first number one in February. Her father, Frank Sinatra, topped the Hot 100 for the first time later in the year.

Chart history
| No. (Note: The "No." column indicates the numerical sequence of number ones in Hot 100 history. "Re" indicates a single returning to number one.) | Issue date | Title | Artist(s) | Ref. |
|---|---|---|---|---|
| 151 | January 1 | "The Sound of Silence" | Simon & Garfunkel | |
| 152 | January 8 | "We Can Work It Out" | The Beatles | |
| 152 | January 15 | "We Can Work It Out" | The Beatles | |
| 151 (re) | January 22 | "The Sound of Silence" | Simon & Garfunkel | |
| 152 (re) | January 29 | "We Can Work It Out" | The Beatles | |
| 153 | February 5 | "My Love" | Petula Clark | |
| 153 | February 12 | "My Love" | Petula Clark | |
| 154 | February 19 | "Lightnin' Strikes" | Lou Christie | |
| 155 | February 26 | "These Boots Are Made for Walkin'" | Nancy Sinatra | |
| 156 | March 5 | "The Ballad of the Green Berets" | SSgt. Barry Sadler | |
| 156 | March 12 | "The Ballad of the Green Berets" | SSgt. Barry Sadler | |
| 156 | March 19 | "The Ballad of the Green Berets" | SSgt. Barry Sadler | |
| 156 | March 26 | "The Ballad of the Green Berets" | SSgt. Barry Sadler | |
| 156 | April 2 | "The Ballad of the Green Berets" | SSgt. Barry Sadler | |
| 157 | April 9 | "(You're My) Soul and Inspiration" | The Righteous Brothers | |
| 157 | April 16 | "(You're My) Soul and Inspiration" | The Righteous Brothers | |
| 157 | April 23 | "(You're My) Soul and Inspiration" | The Righteous Brothers | |
| 158 | April 30 | "Good Lovin'" | The Young Rascals | |
| 159 | May 7 | "Monday, Monday" | The Mamas & the Papas | |
| 159 | May 14 | "Monday, Monday" | The Mamas & the Papas | |
| 159 | May 21 | "Monday, Monday" | The Mamas & the Papas | |
| 160 | May 28 | "When a Man Loves a Woman" | Percy Sledge | |
| 160 | June 4 | "When a Man Loves a Woman" | Percy Sledge | |
| 161 | June 11 | "Paint It Black" | The Rolling Stones | |
| 161 | June 18 | "Paint It Black" | The Rolling Stones | |
| 162 | June 25 | "Paperback Writer" | The Beatles | |
| 163 | July 2 | "Strangers in the Night" | Frank Sinatra | |
| 162 (re) | July 9 | "Paperback Writer" | The Beatles | |
| 164 | July 16 | "Hanky Panky" | Tommy James and the Shondells | |
| 164 | July 23 | "Hanky Panky" | Tommy James and the Shondells | |
| 165 | July 30 | "Wild Thing" | The Troggs | |
| 165 | August 6 | "Wild Thing" | The Troggs | |
| 166 | August 13 | "Summer in the City" | The Lovin' Spoonful | |
| 166 | August 20 | "Summer in the City" | The Lovin' Spoonful | |
| 166 | August 27 | "Summer in the City" | The Lovin' Spoonful | |
| 167 | September 3 | "Sunshine Superman" | Donovan | |
| 168 | September 10 | "You Can't Hurry Love" | The Supremes | |
| 168 | September 17 | "You Can't Hurry Love" | The Supremes | |
| 169 | September 24 | "Cherish" | The Association | |
| 169 | October 1 | "Cherish" | The Association | |
| 169 | October 8 | "Cherish" | The Association | |
| 170 | October 15 | "Reach Out I'll Be There" | Four Tops | |
| 170 | October 22 | "Reach Out I'll Be There" | Four Tops | |
| 171 | October 29 | "96 Tears" | ? and the Mysterians | |
| 172 | November 5 | "Last Train to Clarksville" | The Monkees | |
| 173 | November 12 | "Poor Side of Town" | Johnny Rivers | |
| 174 | November 19 | "You Keep Me Hangin' On" | The Supremes | |
| 174 | November 26 | "You Keep Me Hangin' On" | The Supremes | |
| 175 | December 3 | "Winchester Cathedral" | The New Vaudeville Band | |
| 176 | December 10 | "Good Vibrations" | The Beach Boys | |
| 175 (re) | December 17 | "Winchester Cathedral" | The New Vaudeville Band | |
| 175 (re) | December 24 | "Winchester Cathedral" | The New Vaudeville Band | |
| 177 | December 31 | "I'm a Believer" | The Monkees | |

== Number-one artists ==
List of number-one artists by total weeks at number one
| Weeks at No. 1 | Artist |
|---|---|
| 5 | SSgt Barry Sadler |
| 5 | The Beatles |
| 4 | The Supremes |
| 3 | The Righteous Brothers |
| 3 | The Mamas & Papas |
| 3 | The Lovin' Spoonful |
| 3 | The Association |
| 3 | The New Vaudeville Band |
| 2 | Simon & Garfunkel |
| 2 | Petula Clark |
| 2 | Percy Sledge |
| 2 | The Rolling Stones |
| 2 | Tommy James and the Shondells |
| 2 | The Troggs |
| 2 | Four Tops |
| 2 | The Monkees |
| 1 | Lou Christie |
| 1 | Nancy Sinatra |
| 1 | The Young Rascals |
| 1 | Frank Sinatra |
| 1 | Donovan |
| 1 | ? and the Mysterians |
| 1 | Johnny Rivers |
| 1 | The Beach Boys |

== See also ==
- 1966 in music
- Cashbox Top 100 number-one singles of 1966
- List of Billboard number-one singles
- List of Billboard Hot 100 top-ten singles in 1966
- List of Billboard Hot 100 number-one singles from 1958 to 1969
