= The Boss (Diana Ross album) =

Studio album by Diana Ross
- Released: May 23, 1979
- Recorded: 1979
- Studios: Sigma Sound, New York City; Celebration, New York City
- Genres: R&B; disco; soul
- Length: 35:33
- Label: Motown
- Producer: Nickolas Ashford & Valerie Simpson

Diana Ross chronology
The Wiz: Original Motion Picture Soundtrack (1978)	The Boss (1979)	20 Golden Greats (1979)

Singles from The Boss
- 1. "The Boss" Released: May 22, 1979; 2. "No One Gets the Prize" Released: September 21, 1979; 3. "It's My House" Released: October 20, 1979

Professional ratings
Review scores
Source	Rating
AllMusic	4/5 stars
Christgau's Record Guide	B
The New York Times	(favorable)

The Boss is the tenth studio album by American singer Diana Ross, released on May 23, 1979, by Motown Records.

== Background ==
This album was written and produced by longtime Ross collaborators Nickolas Ashford & Valerie Simpson and marked her return to Top 40 radio based on the strength of the title track, which peaked at number 19 on the pop singles chart, and number 12 on the US R&B Chart. In addition, all the LP tracks went to number one on the dance charts, and the album itself peaked at number 14 on the Billboard 200. It was certified Gold by the Recording Industry Association of America (RIAA).

For its 20th anniversary in 1999, the album was remastered and released on CD with 12" versions of "The Boss" and "It's My House" as extra tracks. The 12" versions of "I Ain't Been Licked" and "No One Gets the Prize"/"The Boss" appear on Diana: Deluxe Edition, and a rare remixed single version of "No One Gets the Prize" on The Motown Anthology – Diana Ross.

Ross also promoted the album on her first HBO special, Standing Room Only. The special was culled from her successful Tour '79 stop at Caesars Palace in Las Vegas, and the setlist included the title song, "The Boss", plus "It's My House", "No One Gets the Prize", "I Ain't Been Licked" and "All for One".

== Track listing ==
All tracks written and produced by Ashford & Simpson.

Side A

1. "No One Gets the Prize" – 4:40
2. "I Ain't Been Licked" – 4:09
3. "All for One" – 4:20
4. "The Boss" – 3:52

Side B

1. "Once in the Morning" – 4:54
2. "It's My House" – 4:34
3. "Sparkle" – 5:23
4. "I'm in the World" – 4:04

1999 Remastered Edition bonus tracks

9. "The Boss" (Original 12" Remix) – 7:15
10. "It's My House" (Original Promotion-only 12" Remix) – 6:07

== Personnel ==
- Diana Ross – lead vocals
- Michael Brecker – saxophone
- Rob Mounsey – horn & string arrangements (tracks: A1–A3)
- Errol Bennett – percussion
- Francisco Centeno – bass
- Ray Chew – keyboards
- Sammy Figueroa – percussion
- Eric Gale – guitar
- Anthony Jackson – bass
- Paul Riser – horn and string arrangements (tracks: B1, B3–B4)
- John Davis – horn and string arrangements (tracks:A4, B3)
- Valerie Simpson – piano, backing vocals
- Nickolas Ashford – backing vocals
- Maxine Waters – backing vocals
- Julia Waters – backing vocals
- Stephanie Spruill – backing vocals
- John Sussewell – drums
- Greg Arnold – re-mix engineer, Marathon Recording NYC
- Douglas Kirkland – photography

== Charts ==
=== Weekly charts ===
Weekly chart performance for The Boss
Chart (1979)	Peak position
Australian Albums (Kent Music Report)	76
Canada Top Albums/CDs (RPM)	38
Finnish Albums (Suomen virallinen lista)	24
Swedish Albums (Sverigetopplistan)	50
UK Albums (Official Charts)	52
US Billboard 200	14
US Top R&B/Hip-Hop Albums (Billboard)	10

=== Year-end charts ===
Year-end chart performance for The Boss
Chart (1979)	Position
US Billboard 200	85
US Top R&B/Hip-Hop Albums (Billboard)	44

== Certifications ==
Region	Certification	Certified units/sales
United States (RIAA)	Gold	500,000^{^}
^{^} Shipments figures based on certification alone.
