= Bob Kerr (musician) =

British comedy trumpet and cornet player (born 1940)

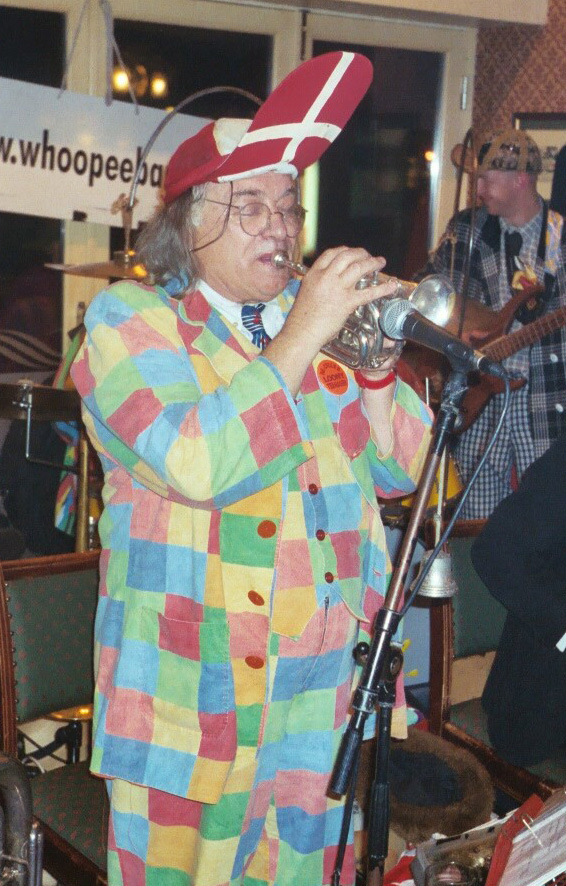
Kerr performing in Lund, October 2004

Robert Kerr (born 14 February 1940) is a comic musician who plays trumpet and cornet. He was originally a member of Spencer's Washboard Kings in 1965 and during 1966 he was a member of the Bonzo Dog Doo-Dah Band. In September 1966, he was persuaded by Geoff Stephens to join The New Vaudeville Band, before forming his own combo, Bob Kerr's Whoopee Band. Kerr was a part of a reunited Bonzo Dog Doo-Dah Band line-up of surviving members, which toured in 2006 and 2008.

He and his son, Matt, also operate a t-shirt printing business. Kerr's musical career is described in David Christie's Doo Dah Diaries.
