= No One Gets the Prize =

Single by Diana Ross

from the album The Boss
- B-side: "Never Say I Don't Love You"
- Released: September 21, 1979
- Recorded: 1979
- Genre: Disco
- Length: 3:52
- Label: Motown
- Songwriters: Nickolas Ashford; Valerie Simpson
- Producer: Ashford & Simpson

Diana Ross singles chronology
"The Boss" (1979)	"No One Gets the Prize" (1979)	"It's My House" (1979)

"No One Gets the Prize" is a song recorded by American singer Diana Ross for her 1979 album The Boss. The song was written and produced by Nicholas Ashford and Valerie Simpson.

The song was released as the second single on September 21, 1979 by Motown Records in Europe, where it reached number 59 on the UK chart. Although it was not released as a single, the song was a great success in the United States: as part of the entire album The Boss, it rose to the top of the Billboard disco chart, and as part of the medley with the song "The Boss" to the top of the dance charts of Cash Box and Record World magazines, in the latter it was also recognized as the fourth most popular disco record of 1979.

In 2020, a remix of Eric Kupper was included on the album Supertonic: Mixes.

== Track listing ==
7" single
A. "No One Gets the Prize" – 3:52
B. "Never Say I Don't Love You" (Greg Wright, Karin Patterson) – 3:50

12" single
A. "It's My House" (Nicholas Ashford, Valerie Simpson) – 6:03
B. "No One Gets the Prize / The Boss" (Nicholas Ashford, Valerie Simpson) – 6:38

12" single
A. Medley (Holland–Dozier–Holland) – 10:00
- "Stop! In the Name of Love"
- "Back in My Arms Again"
- "Come See About Me"
- "Love Is Like an Itching in My Heart"
- "Where Did Our Love Go"
- "Baby Love"
B. "No One Gets the Prize / The Boss" – 6:38

== Charts ==
=== Weekly charts ===
Weekly chart performance for "No One Gets the Prize"
Chart (1979)	Peak position
UK Singles (Record Mirror)	59
US Disco Top 80 (Billboard)	1
US Top 40 Disco (Cash Box)	1
US Disco File Top 50 (Record World)	1

=== Year-end charts ===
Year-end chart performance for "No One Gets the Prize"
Chart (1979)	Peak position
US Disco File Top 50 (Record World)	4
