= Surrender (Diana Ross album) =

1971 studio album

Studio album by Diana Ross
- Released: July 6, 1971
- Genre: R&B
- Length: 34:12
- Label: Motown
- Producer: Ashford & Simpson

Diana Ross chronology
Diana! (1971)	Surrender (1971)	Lady Sings the Blues (1972)

Singles from Surrender
- 1. "Remember Me" Released: December 8, 1970; 2. "Reach Out I'll Be There" Released: April 24, 1971; 3. "Surrender" Released: July 6, 1971

Surrender is the third studio album by American singer Diana Ross, released on July 6, 1971 by Motown Records. The album saw her reuniting with writer-producer team Ashford & Simpson who had overseen her self-titled debut album in 1970. As with Diana Ross, some of the tracks that Ross recorded with the duo had previously been recorded by other Motown artists, including Gladys Knight & the Pips ("Didn't You Know"), Martha Reeves & The Vandellas ("I'm A Winner"), Rita Wright ("I Can't Give Back The Love I Feel For You"), and the Four Tops ("Reach Out (I'll Be There)").

The album reached number 56 on the US Billboard 200 and peaked at number 10 on the US Top R&B/Hip-Hop Albums, selling over 200,000 copies. Following the massive success of the number 1 single "I'm Still Waiting" in the UK, Surrender was reissued under that title, and the hit single was added to the track listing. Another hit on the album was "Remember Me", which reached the top 20 in the US (where it sold over 500,000 copies) as well as the top ten in the UK. The album charted at number 10 in the UK, earning a Silver disc for UK sales in excess of 60,000 copies.

== Critical reception ==
Professional ratings
Review scores
Source	Rating
Allmusic	3/5 stars
Christgau's Record Guide	B

Allmusic editor William Ruhlmann rated the album three out of five stars.

== Track listing ==
All arrangements by Paul Riser. All tracks written by Nickolas Ashford and Valerie Simpson, except where noted.

=== Original release ===
Side A
No.	Title	Writer(s)	Length
1.	"Surrender"		2:53
2.	"I Can't Give Back the Love I Feel for You"	Ashford; Simpson; Brian Holland	3:16
3.	"Remember Me"		3:16
4.	"And If You See Him"		2:50
5.	"Reach Out (I'll Be There)"	Lamont Dozier; Brian Holland; Eddie Holland	4:50

Side B
No.	Title	Writer(s)	Length
1.	"Didn't You Know (You'd Have to Cry Sometime)?"		2:56
2.	"A Simple Thing Like Cry"		2:56
3.	"Did You Read the Morning Paper?"	Ashford; Simpson; Richard Monica	3:53
4.	"I'll Settle for You"	Ashford; Simpson; Josephine Armstead	2:58
5.	"I'm a Winner"		3:05
6.	"All the Befores"		4:35

=== 2008 expanded edition ===
No.	Title	Writer(s)	Length
1.	"Surrender"		2:53
2.	"I Can't Give Back the Love I Feel for You"	Ashford; Simpson; Holland	3:16
3.	"Remember Me"		3:16
4.	"And If You See Him"		2:50
5.	"Reach Out (I'll Be There)"	Dozier; B. Holland; E. Holland	4:50
6.	"Didn't You Know (You'd Have to Cry Sometime)?"		2:56
7.	"A Simple Thing Like Cry"		2:56
8.	"Did You Read the Morning Paper?"	Ashford; Simpson; Monica	3:53
9.	"I'll Settle for You"	Ashford; Simpson; Armstead	2:58
10.	"I'm a Winner"		3:05
11.	"All the Befores"		4:35
12.	"I'm Still Waiting"	Deke Richards	3:45
13.	"Baby I'll Come"		2:56
14.	"Remember Me" (Diana! Vocal/Undubbed Stereo Mix)		3:32
15.	"Reach Out, I'll Be There" (Alternate Vocal)	Dozier; B. Holland; E. Holland	5:42
16.	"I Can't Give Back the Love I Feel for You" (Alternate Vocal)	Ashford; Simpson; B. Holland	3:24
17.	"Ain't No Mountain High Enough" (Alternate Vocal And Mix)		6:44
18.	"Remember Me" (Alternate Vocal And Mix)		3:44
19.	"Surrender" (Alternate Stereo Mix)		3:17
20.	"Remember Me" (Valerie Simpson Demo Vocal)		3:39

== Charts ==
=== Weekly charts ===
Chart performance for Surrender
Chart (1971)	Peak position
Canada Top Albums/CDs (RPM)	46
UK Albums (Official Charts)	10
US Billboard 200	56
US Top R&B/Hip-Hop Albums (Billboard)	10
US Cashbox Top Albums	39

=== Year-end charts ===
Chart (1971)	Position
US Top R&B/Hip-Hop Albums (Billboard)	36

== Certifications ==
Region	Certification	Certified units/sales
United Kingdom (BPI)	Silver	60,000^{^}
^{^} Shipments figures based on certification alone.
