= Freddy Weller =

American singer

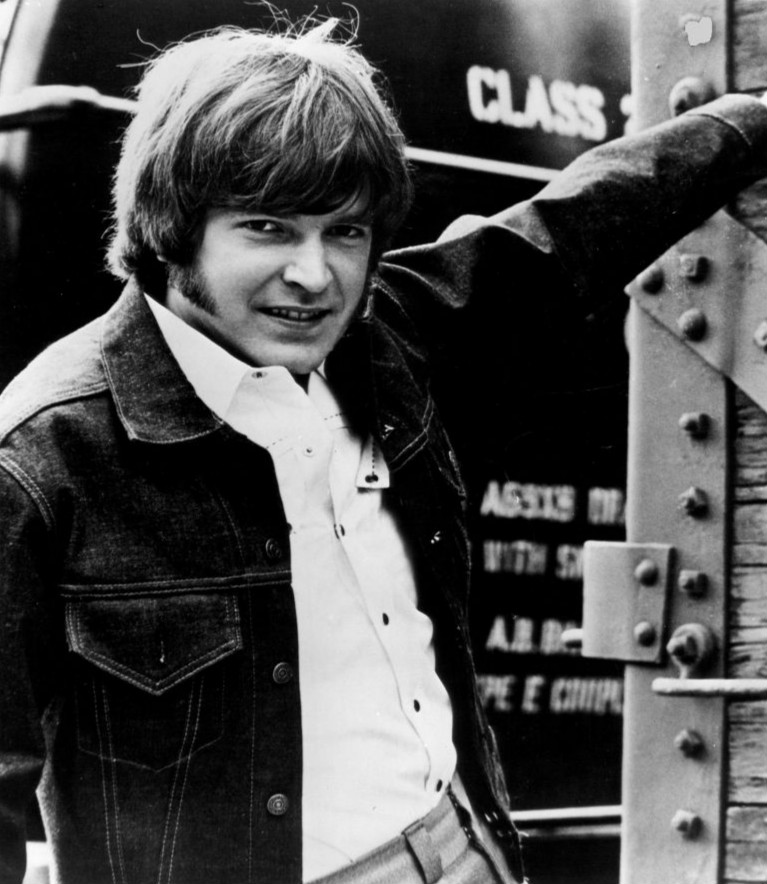
- Weller in 1969

Background information
- Born: Wilton Frederick Weller; September 9, 1943 (age 82); Atlanta, Georgia, United States
- Genres: Country
- Occupations: Singer, guitarist, songwriter
- Instruments: Vocals, guitar
- Years active: 1969–present
- Label: Columbia

Wilton Frederick "Freddy" Weller (born September 9, 1943) is an American rock and roll and country music artist. He recorded for Columbia Records between 1969 and 1980. He had his highest charted single in 1969 with his debut release, "Games People Play". He wrote with Mac Davis on Glen Campbell's "Within My Memory" on A New Place In The Sun in 1968.

== Biography ==
=== Early career ===
He was born in Atlanta, Georgia, United States. Weller played in a high school group, The Believers, which also included Joe South. One of his first recording sessions was playing guitar on Billy Joe Royal's 1965 track, "Down in the Boondocks", which was written by South.

=== Paul Revere & the Raiders ===
His recording career continued in 1967, as lead guitarist in the band Paul Revere & The Raiders. Around the time he joined the band, the group's two main members, Mark Lindsay and Paul Revere, had just started hosting the show Happening '68. The other Raiders members, Charlie Coe, Keith Allison, and Joe Correro Jr, acted as the show's in-studio houseband. He penned their 1969 hit "We Gotta All Get Together".

Weller remained in the Raiders until its split in 1975. The group soon reformed without Weller.

=== Solo ===
Weller recorded many rock and roll and country songs, such as Joe South's "'Games People Play", which peaked at No. 2 on the Billboard Hot Country Singles chart in 1969; Chuck Berry's "The Promised Land" and "Too Much Monkey Business", "She Loves Me Right Out Of My Mind", "Indian Lake", both 1971, and many others. Weller also played guitar backing for both South and Royal. He co-wrote "Dizzy" and "Jam Up and Jelly Tight", which were hits for Tommy Roe in 1969 and 1970.

After releasing his 1980 single "Lost In Austin" and his 1982 studio album Ramblin' Man, Weller would semi-retire from the music industry, not making another release for thirty years, when he released the single "Your Memory Walks Through Walls" in 2010.

== Discography ==
=== With Paul Revere & the Raiders ===
==== Studio albums ====
| Year | Album details |
|---|---|
| 1967 | A Christmas Present ... And Past |
| 1968 | Goin' to Memphis |
| 1968 | Something Happening |
| 1969 | Hard 'N' Heavy (with Marshmallow) |
| 1969 | Alias Pink Puzz |
| 1970 | Collage |
| 1971 | Indian Reservation |
| 1972 | Country Wine |

==== Singles ====
| Song titles | Year |
|---|---|
| "I Had A Dream" b/w "Upon Your Leaving" | 1967 |
| "Peace Of Mind" / "Do Unto Others" | 1967 |
| "Rain, Sleet, Snow" b/w "Brotherly Love" Cancelled single | 1967 |
| "Too Much Talk" b/w "Happening '68" | 1968 |
| "Don't Take It So Hard" b/w "Observation From Flight 285 (In 3/4 Time)" | 1968 |
| "Cinderella Sunshine" b/w "Theme From It's Happening" (Non-Lp track) | 1968 |
| "Mr. Sun, Mr. Moon" b/w "Without You" | 1969 |
| "Let Me" b/w "I Don't Know" | 1969 |
| "We Gotta All Get Together" b/w "Frankfort Side Street" (from Alias Pink Puzz) | 1969 |
| "Just Seventeen" b/w "Sorceress With Blue Eyes" | 1970 |
| "Gone Movin' On" (re-recorded version of Lp track from Revolution!) b/w "Interlude (To Be Forgotten)" | 1970 |
| "Indian Reservation (The Lament of the Cherokee Reservation Indian)" b/w "Terry's Tune" (Non-Lp track) | 1971 |
| "Birds of a Feather" b/w "The Turkey" | 1971 |
| "Country Wine" b/w "It's So Hard Getting Up Today" (Non-Lp track) | 1972 |
| "Powder Blue Mercedes Queen" b/w "Golden Girls Sometimes" | 1972 |
| "Song Seller" b/w "A Simple Song" | 1972 |
| "Love Music" b/w "Goodbye No. 9" | 1973 |
| "All Over You" b/w "Seaboard Line Boogie" | 1974 |
| "Your Love (Is The Only Love)" b/w "Gonna Have A Good Time" | 1975 |
| "Ain't Nothin' Wrong"/ b/w "You're Really Saying Something" | 1976 |

=== Solo ===
==== Albums ====
| Year | Album | Chart Positions | |
| Year | Album | US Country | US |
|---|---|---|---|
| 1969 | Games People Play | 8 | 144 |
| 1970 | Listen to the Young Folks | — | — |
| 1971 | Another Night of Love | 22 | — |
| 1972 | The Promised Land | — | — |
| 1972 | The Roadmaster | 39 | — |
| 1973 | Too Much Monkey Business | 32 | — |
| 1974 | Sexy Lady | 24 | — |
| 1975 | Freddy Weller's Greatest Hits | 34 | — |
| 1975 | Freddy Weller | 34 | — |
| 1976 | Liquor, Love & Life | 44 | — |
| 1977 | One Man Show | — | — |
| 1978 | Love Got in the Way | — | — |
| 1980 | Go For the Night | — | — |
| 1982 | Ramblin' Man | — | — |

==== Singles ====
| Year | Single | Chart Positions | | | Album |
| Year | Single | US Country | US Bubbling | CAN Country | Album |
|---|---|---|---|---|---|
| 1969 | "Games People Play" | 2 | — | — | Games People Play |
| 1969 | "These Are Not My People" | 5 | 13 | — | Games People Play |
| 1969 | "Down in the Boondocks" | 25 | — | — | Listen to the Young Folks |
| 1970 | "I Shook the Hand" | 75 | — | — | Listen to the Young Folks |
| 1971 | "The Promised Land" | 3 | 25 | 9 | The Promised Land / Another Night of Love |
| 1971 | "Indian Lake" | 3 | 8 | 4 | The Promised Land / Another Night of Love |
| 1971 | "Another Night of Love" | 5 | — | 13 | The Promised Land / Another Night of Love |
| 1972 | "Ballad of a Hillbilly Singer" | 26 | — | 12 | The Roadmaster |
| 1972 | "The Roadmaster" | 17 | — | 29 | The Roadmaster |
| 1972 | "She Loves Me (Right Out of My Mind)" | 11 | — | 3 | The Roadmaster |
| 1973 | "Too Much Monkey Business" | 8 | — | 7 | Too Much Monkey Business |
| 1973 | "The Perfect Stranger" | 13 | — | 7 | Too Much Monkey Business |
| 1974 | "I've Just Got to Know (How Loving You Would Be)" | 11 | — | 11 | Sexy Lady |
| 1974 | "Sexy Lady" | 21 | — | 22 | Sexy Lady |
| 1974 | "You're Not Getting Older (You're Getting Better)" | 16 | — | 20 | Sexy Lady |
| 1975 | "Love You Back to Georgia" | 64 | — | — | Freddy Weller |
| 1975 | "Stone Crazy" | 52 | — | — | Freddy Weller |
| 1976 | "Ask Any Old Cheater Who Knows" | 42 | — | — | Liquor, Love and Life |
| 1976 | "Liquor, Love and Life" | 44 | — | — | Liquor, Love and Life |
| 1976 | "Room 269" | 56 | — | — | Liquor, Love and Life |
| 1977 | "Strawberry Curls" | 79 | — | — | One Man Show |
| 1977 | "Merry-Go-Round" | 41 | — | — | One Man Show |
| 1977 | "Nobody Cares But You" | 44 | — | — | One Man Show |
| 1978 | "Let Me Fall Back in Your Arms" | 93 | — | — | single only |
| 1978 | "Bar Wars" | 32 | — | 58 | Love Got in the Way |
| 1978 | "Love Got in the Way" | 23 | — | 34 | Love Got in the Way |
| 1979 | "Fantasy Island" | 27 | — | 32 | Love Got in the Way |
| 1979 | "Nadine" | 40 | — | 53 | singles only |
| 1979 | "That Run-Away Woman of Mine" | 44 | — | — | singles only |
| 1979 | "Go for the Night" | 33 | — | — | Go for the Night |
| 1980 | "A Million Old Goodbyes" | 66 | — | — | Go for the Night |
| 1980 | "Lost in Austin" | 45 | — | 51 | Go for the Night |
| 2010 | "Your Memory Walks Through Walls" | — | — | — | single only |
