= Traci Lords filmography =

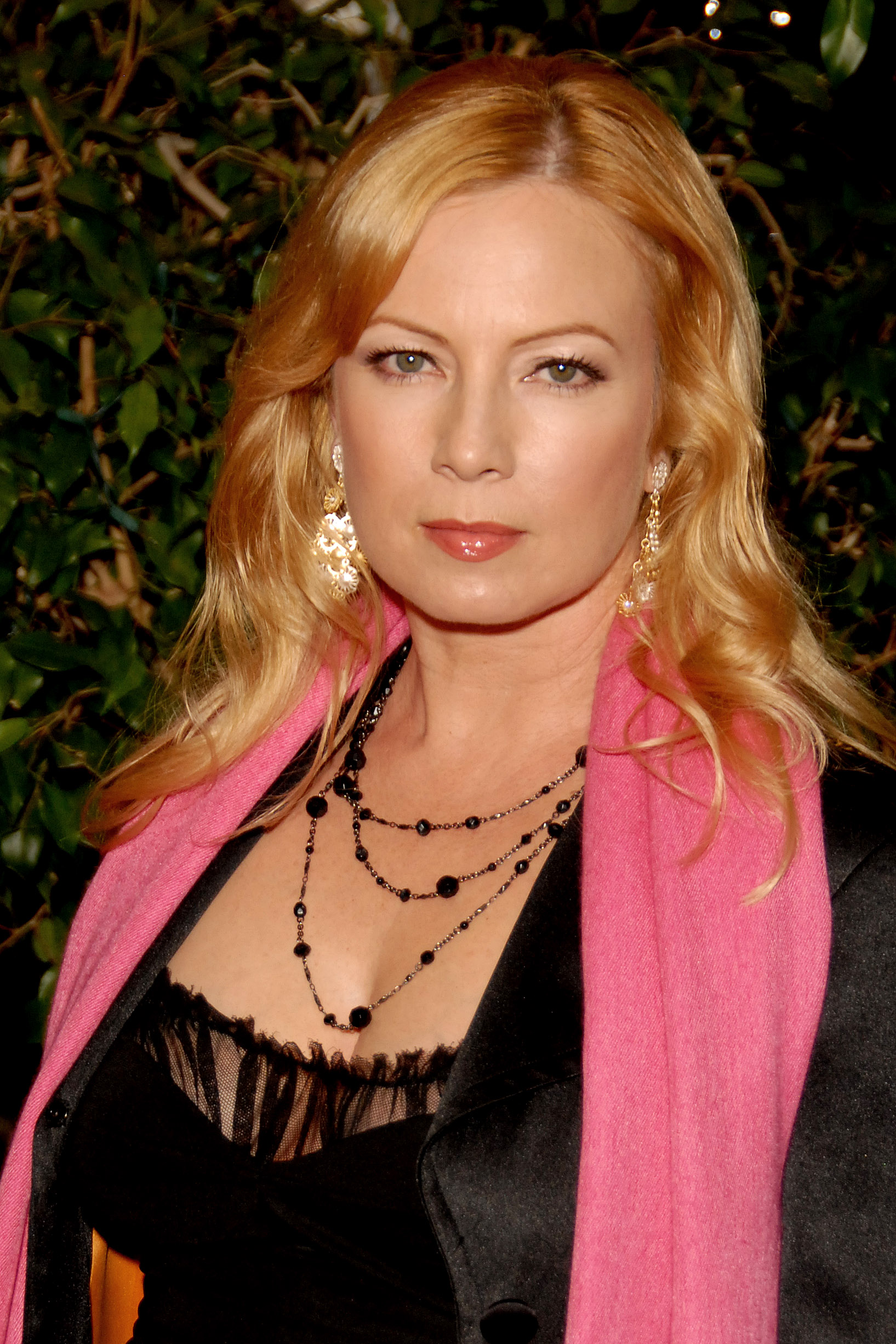
Lords at the QVC Red Carpet Style Party in 2011

Traci Lords is an American actress.

== Career ==
Lords appeared in dozens of pornographic films between 1984 and 1986, nearly all of which were filmed while she was underage; only her last such film, Traci, I Love You (1987), was legal in the United States. Once of age, Lords immediately made a transition to mainstream films.

Lords made her mainstream screen debut in Not of This Earth (1988), a remake of Roger Corman's 1957 film of the same name, playing the leading role of Nadine Story.

Lords followed with Fast Food (1989) and the John Waters' teen comedy Cry-Baby (1990), where she appeared alongside Johnny Depp. The film received positive reviews and the part of Wanda Woodward remains Lords' most notable role.

Around the same time as her film debut in the late 1980s, Lords also appeared in many television series, including Wiseguy, MacGyver, Married... with Children, Highlander, and Tales from the Crypt.

In the early 1990s, Lords starred in various independent and B movies, such as Shock 'Em Dead, Raw Nerve, A Time to Die (1991), Intent to Kill (1992), and Skinner (1993). She also appeared in the television adaptation of the Stephen King novel The Tommyknockers.

While promoting her debut studio album 1000 Fires (1995), Lords landed the role of Rikki Abbott on the television series Melrose Place and also appeared in three episodes of Roseanne.

Lords was a recurring cast member on the crime series Profiler and had a small part in the vampire action film Blade (1998). She kept on making more films and appeared in more television series, including First Wave, Gilmore Girls, and Will & Grace. Her role in the comedy Chump Change (2000) earned her the Film Discovery Jury Award for Best Actress at the U.S. Comedy Arts Festival.

In the 2000s, Lords appeared as Bubbles in the Kevin Smith comedy Zack and Miri Make a Porno (2008). She also had supporting roles in the horror films Excision (2012) and Devil May Call (2013). Her portrayal of Phyllis, a hyperreligious and controlling mother, in Excision (2012) earned her several awards including the Fangoria Chainsaw Award for Best Supporting Actress as well as the Fright Meter Award and the CinEuphoria Award.

== Film ==
Year	Title	Role	Notes	Ref.
1988	Not of This Earth	Nadine Story		
1989	Fast Food	Dixie Love		
1990	Cry-Baby	Wanda Woodward		
1990	Shock 'Em Dead	Lindsay Roberts	Also known as Rock 'em Dead	
1991	Raw Nerve	Gina Clayton		
1991	A Time to Die	Jackie Swanson		
1992	The Nutt House	Miss Tress		
1992	Intent to Kill	Vickie Stewart		
1993	Laser Moon	Barbara Fleck		
1993	Skinner	Heidi		
1993	Desperate Crimes	Laura	Originally titled Il ritmo del silenzio, also known as Mafia Docks	
1994	Plughead Rewired: Circuitry Man II	Norma		
1994	Serial Mom	Carl's Date		
1994	Ice	Ellen Reed		
1995	Your Studio and You	Herself	Short film	
1995	Virtuosity	Media Zone Singer		
1996	Underworld	Anna		
1996	Blood Money	Wendy Monroe		
1997	Nowhere	Val-Chick #1		
1997	Stir	Kelly Bekins		
1997	Full Blast	Lindsay Lord		
1998	Boogie Boy	Shonda Lee Bragg		
1998	Extramarital	Elizabeth		
1998	Blade	Racquel		
1999	Me and Will	The Waitress		
1999	The Killing Club	Laura Engles	Also known as You're Killing Me...	
2000	Epicenter	FBI Agent Amanda Foster	Credited as Traci Elizabeth Lords	
2000	Chump Change	Sam	Credited as Traci Elizabeth Lords	
2000	Certain Guys	Kathleen		
2002	Black Mask 2: City of Masks	"Chameleon"	Credited as Traci Elizabeth Lords; Voiced by Cherrie Ying in the Cantonese dub version	
2003	Manhood	Actress		
2003	Home	Lorna	Short film	
2005	Sweet Pea	—	Director only	
2005	Frostbite	Naomi Bucks		
2006	Novel Romance	Max Normane		
2006	Crazy Eights	Gina Conte		
2007	The Chosen One	Ms. Sultry	Voice only	
2008	Your Name Here	Julie Frick		
2008	Zack and Miri Make a Porno	"Bubbles"		
2009	I Hope They Serve Beer in Hell	Connie		
2009	Princess of Mars	Dejah Thoris		
2011	Au Pair, Kansas	Helen Hazleton	Also known as The Soccer Nanny	
2012	Excision	Phyllis		
2013	Devil May Call	Valerie "Val" Kramer		
2015	Tag	Ann		
2018	Cemetery Tales Presents: A Tale of Two Sisters	Victoria Chastain		
2019	Steam Room Stories: The Movie!	Sally Fay		
2019	Manipulated	Cassandra King		
2020	Nicole, her Ex & the Killer	Mother		
2021	Waking Up Dead	Phyllis		
2021	The Farm	Belle Gunness		
2024	Greedy People	Virginia Chetlo		

== Television ==
Year	Title	Role	Notes	Ref.
1988	Wiseguy	Monique	Episode: "Date with an Angel"	
1989–1991	Married... with Children	T.C. / Vanessa Van Pelt	2 episodes	
1990	Stallone's Knockouts	Ringside Commentator	TV movie	
1990	MacGyver	Jennifer/Jenny	Episode: "MacGyver's Women"	
1991	Super Force	Alien #2	Episode: "Of Human Bondage"	
1991	Murder in High Places	Diane	TV movie	
1993	The Tommyknockers	Nancy Voss	TV movie	
1993	Sweating Bullets	Gwen	Episode: "Katie's Secret"	
1993	Highlander	Greta	Episode: "The Darkness"	
1993	Tales from the Crypt	Emma Conway	Episode: "Two for the Show"	
1994	Bandit's Silver Angel	Angel Austin	TV movie	
1994	Dragstrip Girl	Blanche	TV movie	
1994–1995	Roseanne	Stacy Flagler	3 episodes	
1995	Melrose Place	Rikki Abbott	4 episodes	
1995	As Good as Dead	Nicole Grace	TV movie	
1996	Dead Man's Island	Miranda Prescott	TV movie	
1997	Nash Bridges	Sean Collins	Episode: "Knockout"	
1997	Nick Freno: Licensed Teacher	Suzanne Wilkinson	Episode: "My Phony Valentine"	
1997	Viper	Talia Massey	Episode: "The List"	
1997–1998	Profiler	Sharon Lesher	Recurring cast (Season 2)	
1999	D.R.E.A.M. Team	Lena Brant	TV movie Credited as Traci Elizabeth Lords	
1999	Hercules: The Legendary Journeys	Luscious Deluxe	Episode: "Hercules, Tramps & Thieves"; Credited as Traci Elizabeth Lords	
2000–2001	First Wave	Jordan Radcliffe	Recurring cast Credited as Traci Elizabeth Lords	
2002	They Shoot Divas, Don't They?	Mira	TV movie Credited as Traci Elizabeth Lords	
2003	Deathlands: Homeward Bound	Lady Rachel Cawdor	TV movie Credited as Traci Elizabeth Lords	
2003	Gilmore Girls	Natalie Zimmermann	Episode: "The Fundamental Things Apply"; Credited as Traci Elizabeth Lords	
2005	Will & Grace	Rose	Episode: "Birds of a Feather Boa"	
2005	Wanted	Bartender	2 episodes	
2007	Andy Barker, P.I.	Loretta Crispin	Episode: "Dial M for Laptop"	
2007	Point of Entry	Brianna Fine	TV movie	
2007	The Greatest Show Ever	Cow Girl	TV movie	
2013–2019	EastSiders	Val	8 episodes	
2015	Sharkansas Women's Prison Massacre	Detective Kendra Patterson	TV movie	
2016	Nightmare Nurse	Barb	TV movie	
2016–2018	Swedish Dicks	Jane McKinney	Recurring cast	

== Music video appearances ==
Year	Title	Performer	Album	Ref.
1984	"Gimme Gimme Good Lovin'"	Helix	Walkin' the Razor's Edge	
1987	"Notorious"	Loverboy	Wildside	
1991	"TRASH SONGS"	ODD-BOWZ	TRASH IT!	
1991	"I Wanna Sex You Up"	Color Me Badd	C.M.B.	
1994	"Back on the Street"	Jay Miles	9 Hours	

== Video games ==
Year	Title	Character	Ref.
2002	Defender	Commander Kyoto	
2004	Ground Control II: Operation Exodus	Dr. Alice McNeil	
2005	True Crime: New York City	Madam Cassandra Hartz	
2012	Hitman: Absolution	Layla Stockton	
2016	Hitman	Dino's agent / Dexy Barat / Maya Parvati	
2016	Let It Die	Jackal Z	
2025	Rusty Rabbit	Whitney	

== Pornographic videos ==
Year	Title	Role	Notes
1984	What Gets Me Hot!	Lannie (as Tracy Lords)	First porn movie
1984	The Sex Goddess	Marilyn	
1984	Talk Dirty to Me Part III	The Mermaid	Scenes replaced by new scenes featuring Lisa De Leeuw
1984	Those Young Girls	Traci (as Tracy Lords)	
1984	Aroused		
1984	Sister Dearest	Vicky Jennings	Scenes edited out
1984	Sweet Little Things	Traci	Traci & Leah use classified ads searching for an apartment
1985	Wild Things	School Girl	
1985	The Adventures of Tracy Dick: The Case of the Missing Stiff	Tracy Dick (as Tracy Lords)	
1985	Educating Mandy	Mandy	Scenes are used in the comedy From Beijing with Love by Stephen Chow, as the "painkiller" when he was undergoing the operation for bullet removal
1985	Holly Does Hollywood	Tracy	
1985	Black Throat	Debbie	
1985	Future Voyeur	Traci	
1985	Harlequin Affair	Tracy (as Tracy Lords)	
1985	Hollywood Heartbreakers		
1985	It's My Body	Maggie	
1985	Perfect Fit	Diane Green	
1985	The Grafenberg Spot (aka The G-Spot)	Tracy (as Tracy Lords)	
1985	Love Bites	Nurse	
1986	Traci Takes Tokyo	Traci	Banned in the U.S.
1986	Beverly Hills Copulator	Michelle Leon (as Tracy Lords)	
1986	Traci, I Love You	Traci	Last pornographic film and the only one featuring all of her scenes intact that is legally available in the U.S. and some other countries, as it was made two days after her 18th birthday.
