= Jam Up and Jelly Tight =

1969 single by Tommy Roe

Single by Tommy Roe

from the album 12 in a Roe: A Collection of Tommy Roe's Greatest Hits
- B-side: "Moontalk"
- Released: November 1969
- Genre: Bubblegum pop
- Length: 2:23
- Label: ABC Records 11247
- Songwriters: Tommy Roe, Freddy Weller
- Producer: Steve Barri

Tommy Roe singles chronology
"Jack and Jill" (1969)	"Jam Up and Jelly Tight" (1970)	"Stir It Up and Serve It" (1970)

"Jam Up and Jelly Tight" is a song written by Tommy Roe and Freddy Weller and performed by Roe. The song was produced by Steve Barri and arranged by Mike Henderson.

== Chart performance ==
It reached number 5 in both Canada and Australia and also number 8 on the Billboard Hot 100 in 1970. It reached number 15 on the New Zealand Listener charts. It was featured on his 1970 album, 12 in a Roe: A Collection of Tommy Roe's Greatest Hits.

== Other versions ==
- Teenage Head released a version on their 1986 album Trouble in the Jungle.
