= Surrender (Diana Ross song) =

Single by Diana Ross

from the album Surrender
- B-side: "I'm a Winner"
- Released: July 6, 1971
- Genre: Soul
- Length: 2:53
- Label: Motown
- Songwriter: Nickolas Ashford & Valerie Simpson
- Producer: Ashford & Simpson

Diana Ross singles chronology
"Reach Out (I'll Be There)" (1971)	"Surrender" (1971)	"I'm Still Waiting" (1971)

"Surrender" is a song composed and produced by Ashford & Simpson and sung from singer Diana Ross' album of the same name in 1971 on the Motown label. It was released as the album's third single on July 6, 1971.

The single became Ross' fifth top forty single since she became a solo artist shortly after leaving The Supremes. The song peaked at number 38 on the Billboard Hot 100, number 16 on the R&B chart. Outside the US, "Surrender" eventually hit the top ten in the United Kingdom, where it peaked at number 10, becoming her fourth consecutive top ten hit in that country.

== Chart performance ==
Chart (1971)	Peak position
UK Singles (The Official Charts Company)	10
US Billboard Hot 100	38
US Best Selling Soul Singles (Billboard)	16

== Personnel ==
- Lead vocal by Diana Ross
- Background vocals by Ashford & Simpson and Joshie Armstead
- Instrumentation by The Funk Brothers

== Cover versions ==
- In 1983, The Fifth Dimension recorded a disco-flavored cover version of this song for Sutra Records, featuring Florence LaRue on lead vocals. It is virtually the same song but is credited to writers Lenny Stack and Cheryl Christians instead of Ashford & Simpson.
