= Reach Out I'll Be There =

1966 song by the Four Tops

- US picture sleeve

Single by the Four Tops

from the album Reach Out
- B-side: "Until You Love Someone"
- Released: August 18, 1966
- Recorded: July 27, 1966
- Studio: Hitsville U.S.A., Detroit
- Genre: Soul
- Length: 2:56
- Label: Motown
- Songwriter: Holland–Dozier–Holland
- Producers: Brian Holland; Lamont Dozier

The Four Tops singles chronology
"Loving You Is Sweeter Than Ever" (1966)	"Reach Out I'll Be There" (1966)	"Standing in the Shadows of Love" (1966)

Official Audio
- "Reach Out I'll Be There" on YouTube

"Reach Out I'll Be There" (also rendered as "Reach Out (I'll Be There)") is a song recorded by the American vocal quartet the Four Tops. Written and produced by Motown's main production team, Holland–Dozier–Holland, it is one of the most notable Motown hits of the 1960s.

Released as a single on August 18, 1966, it was the number one song on the Rhythm & Blues chart for two weeks and on the Billboard Hot 100 for two weeks in October 1966. The track also reached number one on the UK Singles Chart for three weeks beginning on October 27, 1966, becoming Motown's second UK chart-topper after the Supremes' "Baby Love" (1964). It was ranked the number five hit of 1966 on the Billboard Year-End Hot 100. In July 1967, it was included on the group's fourth studio album, Reach Out.

Rolling Stone later ranked "Reach Out" number 206 on its list of "The 500 Greatest Songs of All Time". In 2022, it was selected by the Library of Congress for preservation in the National Recording Registry.

== Writing and recording ==
In 1966, the Motown songwriting and production team Holland–Dozier–Holland were writing new songs for the Four Tops to record for an album. Lamont Dozier said that he wanted to write "a journey of emotions with sustained tension, like a bolero. To get this across, I alternated the keys, from a minor, Russian feel in the verse to a major, gospel feel in the chorus." He developed the lyrics with Eddie Holland, aiming for them to sound "as though they were being thrown down vocally." Dozier said that they were strongly influenced by Bob Dylan at the time: "We wanted [Four Tops frontman] Levi [Stubbs] to shout-sing the lyrics... as a shout-out to Dylan."

According to Four Tops backing vocalist Duke Fakir, the writers and producers intentionally put Stubbs at the top of his vocal range, "to make sure he'd have that cry and hunger and wailing in his voice." Arranger Paul Riser overdubbed instruments including a piccolo and flute in the intro, as well as a drum pattern played with timpani mallets on a tambourine head. After the recording was completed, the group begged Motown head Berry Gordy not to release it; according to Fakir, "for us, the song felt a little odd." However, Gordy insisted that it be issued as a single.

== Style ==
Levi Stubbs delivers much of the song in a tone that straddles the line between singing and shouting, as he did on the group's 1965 hit "I Can't Help Myself (Sugar Pie Honey Bunch)". AllMusic critic Ed Hogan praises Stubbs' vocals, as well as the song's "rock-solid groove" and "dramatic, semi-operatic tension and release." Critic Martin Charles Strong calls the song "a soul symphony of epic proportions that remains [the Four Tops'] signature tune."

In 2014, Fakir stated in an interview with The Guardian:

Eddie [Holland] realized that when Levi hit the top of his vocal range, it sounded like someone hurting, so he made him sing right up there. Levi complained, but we knew he loved it. Every time they thought he was at the top, he would reach a little further until you could hear the tears in his voice. The line "Just look over your shoulder" was something he threw in spontaneously. Levi was creative like that; he could always add something from the heart.

== Reception ==
Cash Box called the song "a hard-driving, pulsating pop-r&b romancer about a very-much-in-love guy who claims that he'll always be at his gal's beck-and-call."

In 1988, Jon Wilde of Melody Maker called it the third-best UK number one single to date, stating: "The bit that sounds like a horse galloping at the beginning is fairly unbeatable but, when Levi starts up, I swear it's one of the finest sights in the solar system."

== Charts ==
=== Weekly charts ===
Chart (1966–1967)	Peak position
Argentina (CAPIF)	1
Australia (Kent Music Report)	62
Belgium (Ultratop 50 Flanders)	10
Canada Top Singles (RPM)	6
Ireland (IRMA)	4
Netherlands (Dutch Top 40)	8
Netherlands (Single Top 100)	6
New Zealand (Listener)	11
Spain (Cash Box)	1
UK Singles (Official Charts)	1
US Billboard Hot 100	1
US Hot Rhythm & Blues Singles (Billboard)	1
US Cash Box Top 100	1
US Record World Top 100	2
West Germany (GfK)	13

1988 Remix
Chart (1988)	Peak position
Ireland (IRMA)	11
New Zealand (Recorded Music NZ)	28
UK Singles (Official Charts)	11

Michael Bolton with the Four Tops
Chart (1993)	Peak position
Canada Adult Contemporary (RPM)	2
Europe (European Hit Radio)	31
UK Airplay (Music Week)	38

=== Year-end charts ===
Chart (1966)	Position
Belgium (Ultratop 50 Flanders)	67
Netherlands (Dutch Top 40)	47
US Billboard Hot 100	4
US Cash Box Top 100	38

Chart (1993)	Position
Canada Adult Contemporary (RPM)	33

== Certifications ==
Region	Certification	Certified units/sales
New Zealand (RMNZ)	Gold	15,000^{‡}
United Kingdom (BPI)	Platinum	600,000^{‡}
United States (RIAA)	Gold	500,000^{^}
^{^} Shipments figures based on certification alone.^{‡} Sales+streaming figures based on certification alone.

== Legacy ==
In 1998, the original Four Tops version of the song was inducted into the Grammy Hall of Fame. It was selected by the Library of Congress for preservation in the National Recording Registry in 2022.

Joe Biden used the song during his 2020 presidential campaign.

Many artists have covered the song, including the Jaded Hearts Club in 2020.

== Diana Ross version ==
"Reach Out I'll Be There"

Single by Diana Ross

from the album Surrender
- B-side: "(They Long to Be) Close to You"
- Released: 1971
- Studio: Hitsville U.S.A. (Studio A)
- Length: 5:34 (album version); 4:03 (single version)
- Label: Motown
- Songwriter: Holland–Dozier–Holland
- Producer: Nickolas Ashford & Valerie Simpson

Diana Ross singles chronology
"Remember Me" (1970)	"Reach Out I'll Be There" (1971)	"Surrender" (1971)

American singer Diana Ross covered "Reach Out, I'll Be There" in 1971. Her version was released by Motown from her third album, Surrender (1971). It was produced by Ashford & Simpson, and reached number 29 on the US Billboard Hot 100 and number 35 in Canada.

=== Charts ===
Chart (1971)	Peak position
Canada Top Singles (RPM)	35
US Billboard Hot 100	29
US Best Selling Soul Singles (Billboard)	17
US Easy Listening (Billboard)	16
US Cash Box Top 100	19

== Gloria Gaynor version ==
"Reach Out, I'll Be There"
- Artwork for German single, also used for Portugal and Yugoslavian releases

Single by Gloria Gaynor

from the album Never Can Say Goodbye
- B-side: "Searchin'"
- Released: 1975
- Recorded: 1974
- Genre: Disco
- Length: 3:07
- Label: MGM
- Songwriter: Holland–Dozier–Holland
- Producers: Tony Bongiovi; Meco Monardo; Jay Ellis

Gloria Gaynor singles chronology
"Never Can Say Goodbye" (1974)	"Reach Out, I'll Be There" (1975)	"Walk on By" (1975)

Music video
- "Reach Out, I'll Be There" on YouTube

"Reach Out, I'll Be There" was covered by American singer Gloria Gaynor in 1975. It was the third of three singles released by MGM from her debut album, Never Can Say Goodbye (1975). It peaked at number 60 in the US, number 16 in Canada, number 14 in the UK, and number five in West Germany.

=== Charts ===
==== Weekly charts ====
Chart (1975)	Peak position
Australia (Kent Music Report)	35
Austria (Ö3 Austria Top 40)	13
Belgium (Ultratop 50 Flanders)	5
Canada Top Singles (RPM)	16
Netherlands (Dutch Top 40)	4
Netherlands (Single Top 100)	3
South Africa (Springbok Radio)	11
UK Singles (Official Charts)	14
US Billboard Hot 100	60
US Disco Singles (Billboard)	3
US Hot R&B Singles (Billboard)	56
US Cash Box Top 100	60
West Germany (GfK)	5

==== Year-end charts ====
Chart (1975)	Rank
Belgium (Ultratop 50 Flanders)	30
Canada Top Singles (RPM)	138
Netherlands (Dutch Top 40)	58
Netherlands (Single Top 100)	70
US (Joel Whitburn's Pop Annual)	361
West Germany (Official German Charts)	25

== See also ==
- Reach Out: The Motown Record
- List of Billboard Hot 100 number-one singles of 1966
- List of Cash Box Top 100 number-one singles of 1966
- List of number-one R&B singles of 1966 (U.S.)
- List of UK Singles Chart number ones of the 1960s
