= It's My House =

Single by Diana Ross

from the album The Boss
- B-side: "Sparkle"
- Released: 20 October 1979
- Recorded: 1979
- Genre: R&B; disco; funk; soul
- Length: 4:34
- Label: Motown
- Songwriters: Nickolas Ashford; Valerie Simpson
- Producer: Ashford & Simpson

Diana Ross singles chronology
"No One Gets the Prize" (1979)	"It's My House" (1979)	"Upside Down" (1980)

"It's My House" is a ballad composed by the rhythm and blues writing team of Ashford and Simpson, recorded by Motown icon Diana Ross for her 1979 album release The Boss, from which it was issued as the third and final single on 20 October 1979 by the label.

== Background and commercial reception ==
Valerie Simpson of Ashford and Simpson described "It's My House" with the following: "The song is about a modern woman who tells her lover: 'I'm independent and may fit you into my space - but on my terms.' Those are Diana's ideas."

The song peaked at No. 27 on the Billboard R&B chart, and (the Record World Pop Singles No. 101-No. 150 ranking ranked "It's My House" as high as No. 106).

The UK Singles Chart afforded a No. 32 peak to "It's My House", which was the third UK single from The Boss album - following the title cut and "No One Gets the Prize", both of which fared less well on the UK charts than "It's My House" (the UK chart peaks of "The Boss" and "No One Gets the Prize" being respectively No. 40 and No. 59). Ross' version of "It's My House" also statistically bested a reggae-styled cover version by Storm which despite debuting on the UK Top 75 singles ranking a week prior to the Ross single rose no higher than No. 36.

Reaching No. 71 on the Australian national singles ranking, "It's My House" had its best global chart showing in South Africa where the Springbok Radio hit parade ranked "It's My House" as high as No. 7.

== Personnel ==
- Lead vocals by Diana Ross
- Background vocals by Stephanie Spruill, Maxine Waters and Julia Waters
- Produced by Ashford & Simpson

== Charts ==
Chart performance for "It's My House"
Chart (1979)	Peak position
Australia (Kent Music Report)	71
South Africa (Springbok Radio)	7
UK Singles (Official Charts)	32
US Hot R&B/Hip-Hop Songs (Billboard)	27

== Covers and sampling ==
Besides the cover by Storm which reached No. 36 UK, reggae-style recordings of "It's My House" have also been made by Salena Jones (from the 1980 album Love is in the Air) and Billy Biggs (from the 1980 album What's Your Sign). Latin singer La Lupe covered a Spanish language version of the song ("Es Mi Casa") on her 1980 album "En algo nuevo," which also happened to be her final original album shortly before she announced her retirement. Lady Gaga's song "Replay" from her 2020 album, Chromatica, features a sample of "It's My House". Mejja from Kenya also sampled the song with his hit Niko poa produced by Clemo of Calif records. The song is used in the first episode of the second season of the comedy-drama series Big Little Lies, playing as Laura Dern's character participates in a magazine cover shoot at her home.

John Mayer performed an acoustic guitar version of the song for presenter Andy Cohen on his birthday in 2018.
