= Hooray for Hazel =

Single by Tommy Roe

from the album Sweet Pea
- B-side: "Need Your Love"
- Released: September 1966
- Genre: Pop rock
- Length: 2:28
- Label: ABC Records 10852
- Songwriter(s): Tommy Roe

Tommy Roe singles chronology
"Sweet Pea" (1966)	"Hooray for Hazel" (1966)	"It's Now Winters Day" (1966)

"Hooray for Hazel" is a song written and performed by Tommy Roe with backing vocals by Lee Mallory. It reached number 1 in New Zealand, number 2 in Canada, number 6 on the Billboard Hot 100, and number 28 in Australia, in 1966. It was featured on his 1966 album Sweet Pea.

The song was ranked number 43 on Billboard magazine's Top Hot 100 songs of 1966.

== Other versions ==
- Teddy Robin and the Playboys released a version in 1967.
