= Remember Me (Diana Ross song) =

Single by Diana Ross

from the album Surrender
- B-side: "How About You"
- Released: December 8, 1970
- Recorded: 1970
- Studio: Hitsville U.S.A. (Studio A) Detroit, Michigan
- Genre: Soul
- Length: 3:39
- Label: Motown
- Songwriter: Ashford & Simpson
- Producers: Nickolas Ashford & Valerie Simpson

Diana Ross singles chronology
| "Ain't No Mountain High Enough" (1970) | "Remember Me" (1970) | "Reach Out (I'll Be There)" (1971) |

"Remember Me" is a 1970 single recorded and released by singer Diana Ross on the Motown label and was included on her 1971 album Surrender. The song was released as the album's first single on December 8, 1970, by the label. It was written and produced by Ashford & Simpson. In the US, the song was Ross' third top forty pop hit within a year, peaking at number 16 on the Hot 100 chart and number 10 on the soul chart. It was also Diana Ross' third entry on the Easy Listening chart, where it went to number 20. It gave Diana her third gold single in a year and her third top 10 charting single in Cash Box, peaking at number eight. Overseas, "Remember Me" reached the top ten in the UK, where it reached number seven. It was the lead single from Ross' 1971 album, Surrender.

== Overview ==
The song was written and produced by the Motown collaborators Ashford & Simpson. The song is written from the view of a spurned woman who requests that her ex-boyfriend remembers her for all the positive things she had brought to his life.

== Personnel ==
- Lead vocals by Diana Ross
- Background vocals by Ashford & Simpson
- Produced by Ashford & Simpson

== Chart performance ==
=== Weekly charts ===
Weekly chart performance for "Remember Me"
| Chart (1970–1971) | Peak position |
|---|---|
| Canada RPM Top Singles | 9 |
| UK | 7 |
| US Billboard Hot 100 | 16 |
| US Billboard Adult Contemporary | 20 |
| US Billboard R&B/Soul | 10 |
| US Cash Box Top 100 | 8 |

=== Year-end charts ===
Year-end chart performance for "Remember Me"
| Chart (1971) | Rank |
|---|---|
| UK | 72 |
| US (Joel Whitburn's Pop Annual) | 133 |
| US Cash Box Top 100 | 75 |

== Cover version ==
Boys Town Gang recorded a medley of "Remember Me" together with "Ain't No Mountain High Enough" in 1981. The single was a No. 5 U.S. Dance hit and a top 20 hit in Belgium and the Netherlands. Kim Wilde covered "Remember Me" on her Snapshots album in 2011.

In 2020, Bon Harris of Nitzer Ebb did a cover of the song for his Songs From the Lemon Tree sessions, which was released on YouTube.
