= Li'l Red Riding Hood =

- Cover artwork from the album Li'l Red Riding Hood

Single by Sam the Sham and the Pharaohs

from the album Li'l Red Riding Hood
- B-side: "Love Me Like Before"
- Released: June 1966
- Genre: Garage rock; rock and roll; pop
- Length: 2:35
- Label: MGM
- Songwriter: Ronald Blackwell

Sam the Sham and the Pharaohs singles chronology
"Red Hot" (1966)	"Li'l Red Riding Hood" (1966)	"The Hair on My Chinny Chin Chin" (1966)

"Li'l Red Riding Hood" is a 1966 song performed by Sam the Sham and the Pharaohs. It was the group's second top-10 hit, reaching No. 2 on the Billboard Hot 100 in August 1966. Outside the US, it peaked at No. 2 on the Canadian RPM magazine charts. It was certified gold by the RIAA on August 11, 1966. On the New Zealand Listener charts it peaked at No.3.

== Premise ==
The lyrics are written in the perspective of the Big Bad Wolf, who sees Little Red Riding Hood walking in the woods, and tries to convince her to let him walk with her to her grandmother's house while he wears a sheep suit. The words of Riding Hood in the original story are instead echoed by the Wolf himself, as he sings lines such as ″What big eyes you have″ and ″What full lips you have″. While the story can be taken at face value as a retelling of Riding Hood's first encounter with the wolf in the woods with only superficial changes, it has also been interpreted as ″a courtship dance″ in which ″the wolf pursues the girl not in search of a meal but in hopes of a date.″

== Notable cover versions ==
To promote her 2011 film, Red Riding Hood, star Amanda Seyfried performed a cover of the song.

== In popular culture ==
- The song is a prominent plot element in the film Striking Distance (1993).
- In the Rocko's Modern Life episode "Who's For Dinner" (1993), the song plays in the background when Rocko visits the Wolfe household.
- It is featured in the films Wild Country (2005), Digging for Fire (2015), and Wolves at the Door (2016).
- A cover by Laura Gibson was in a 2012 Volvo commercial for its S60T5.
- The song appears in the Grimm episode "Red Menace" (2014).
- It appears just after the opening titles of the episode of the British soap opera Coronation Street that aired on the ITV network on October 18, 2021.
- The song often plays on the radio while driving in the game Mafia III released in October 2016.

== Certifications ==
Certifications for "Li'l Red Riding Hood"
Region	Certification	Certified units/sales
United States (RIAA)	Gold	1,000,000^{^}
^{^} Shipments figures based on certification alone.
