= Winchester Cathedral (song) =

1966 single by Geoff Stephens, performed by the New Vaudeville Band

Single by the New Vaudeville Band

from the album Winchester Cathedral
- B-side: "Wait for Me Baby"
- Released: 26 August 1966
- Studio: Advision, London
- Genre: Novelty; music hall; pop
- Length: 2:24
- Label: Fontana
- Songwriter: Geoff Stephens
- Producer: Geoff Stephens

The New Vaudeville Band singles chronology
"Winchester Cathedral" (1966)	"Peek-a-Boo" (1967)

Official audio
- "Winchester Cathedral" on YouTube

"Winchester Cathedral" is a song by the New Vaudeville Band, a British novelty group established by the song's composer, Geoff Stephens. It was released in late 1966 by Fontana Records.

The song reached number 1 in Canada on the RPM 100 chart, co-charting with the Dana Rollin version, and shortly thereafter in the US on the Billboard Hot 100 chart. Stephens was a fan of tunes from the British music hall era (or what Americans would call "vaudeville"), so he wrote "Winchester Cathedral" in that vein, complete with a Rudy Vallée soundalike vocalist, John Carter, singing through his cupped hands to imitate singing through a megaphone as Vallée did.

Although the song was recorded entirely by session musicians, when it became an international hit, an actual band had to be assembled, with Fontana trying unsuccessfully to recruit the Bonzo Dog Doo-Dah Band. The recording is one of the few charting songs to feature a bassoon. The band toured extensively under the guidance of Peter Grant, who later went on to manage The Yardbirds and Led Zeppelin.

The song won the 1967 Grammy Award for Best Contemporary (R&R) Recording. An initial long-playing album including the song was issued in late 1966 by Fontana Records, also titled Winchester Cathedral. Stephens received the 1966 Ivor Novello Award for "Best Song Musically and Lyrically".

In 2016, to celebrate the 50th anniversary of the song's release, a new version by Geoff Stephens was released on CD by Signum Classics, sung by members of the Winchester Cathedral Choir. The premier performance of this version was to take place during a gala concert in Winchester Cathedral on March 12, 2016, to help raise funds for the Cathedral's Appeal.

== Chart performance ==
The tune went to number 4 in the UK Record Retailer chart (now recognised as the official UK Singles Chart for that period). It went all the way to the top in the US, displacing "You Keep Me Hangin' On" by the Supremes on December 3, 1966. After one week at No. 1, "Winchester Cathedral" was knocked off the summit by the Beach Boys' "Good Vibrations", only to rebound to the top spot the next week. After a two-week run, it was knocked off the top for good by The Monkees' "I'm a Believer". "Winchester Cathedral" also topped the Billboard Easy Listening chart for four weeks.

Global sales of the single were over three million, with the RIAA certification of gold disc status.

=== Weekly charts ===
Chart (1966–1967)	Peak position
Argentina (CAPIF)	2
Australia (Go-Set)	2
Australia (Kent Music Report)	1
Austria (Ö3 Austria Top 40)	8
Belgium (Ultratop 50 Flanders)	6
Belgium (Ultratop 50 Wallonia)	9
Brazil (O Globo, Rio de Janeiro)	2
Canada Top Singles (RPM)	1
France (IFOP)	13
Germany (GfK)	15
Ireland (IRMA)	6
Italy (Musica e dischi)	3
Japan (Oricon)	12
Mexico (Audiomuisca)	2
Netherlands (Dutch Top 40)	31
New Zealand (Listener)	3
Rhodesia (Lyons Maid)	2
Singapore (Radio Singapore)	1
South Africa (Springbok Radio)	1
Spain (Promusicae)	1
Switzerland (Musikmarkt)	2
UK Disc and Music Echo Top 50	4
UK Melody Maker Top 50	2
UK New Musical Express Top 30	4
UK Record Retailer Top 50	4
US Billboard Hot 100	1
US Adult Contemporary (Billboard)	1
US Cash Box Top 100	1

=== Year-end charts ===
Chart (1966)	Position
Australia (Kent Music Report)	9
Belgium (Ultratop Flanders)	49
South Africa (Springbok Radio)	12
Spain (Promusicae)	9
US (Joel Whitburn's Pop Annual)	3

=== All-time charts ===
Chart (1958–2018)	Position
US Billboard Hot 100 60th Anniversary	330

== Certifications ==
Region	Certification	Certified units/sales
United States (RIAA)	Gold	1,000,000^{^}
^{^} Shipments figures based on certification alone.

== Cover versions ==
- Dana Rollin's version, released in October 1966, peaked at number 71 on the Billboard Hot 100.
- John Smith and the New Sound released a cover in November 1966 which peaked at number 17 on the German charts.
- Frank Sinatra also recorded it for his 1966 album That's Life. His version was released as a single in Italy and South America in early 1967 and peaked at number 12 on the Italian Musica e dischi chart.
- Rudy Vallee made a recording of Winchester Cathedral while in England on December 2, 1966.
