= The New Vaudeville Band =

UK musical group

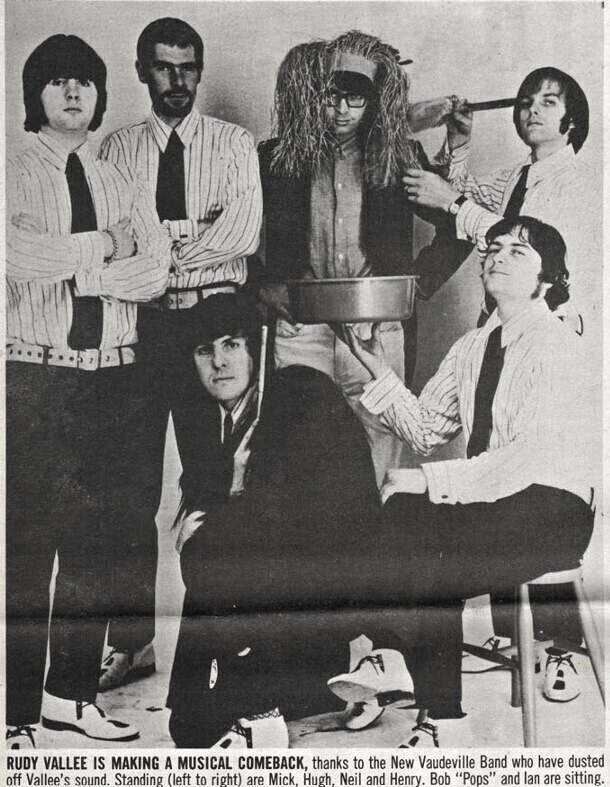

Background information
- Origin: England
- Genres: Novelty, music hall
- Years active: 1966–1988
- Label: Fontana Records
- Past members: Geoff Stephens; Mick Wilsher; Alan Klein; Henri Harrison; Bob Kerr; Stan Haywood; John Carter; Neil Korner; Paul G. T. Wright; Robert Lewis Hay-Smythe; Ian Carfrae; Martin Roke; Kenneth Bache; Hugh Watts

The New Vaudeville Band was an English group created by songwriter Geoff Stephens in 1966 to record his novelty composition "Winchester Cathedral", a song inspired by the dance bands of the 1920s and a Rudy Vallée megaphone-style vocal. To his surprise, the song became a transatlantic hit that autumn, reaching the Top 10 in the United Kingdom and rising to No. 1 in the United States. The New Vaudeville Band initially was a studio group composed of session players, but Stephens quickly assembled a permanent group to continue recording and to play live shows. The group has been periodically revived since, without Stephens' participation.

The New Vaudeville Band placed several singles in the US and UK Top 40 through 1967. The group was nominated for two Grammy Awards, one for Record of the Year and they won in the Contemporary (R&R) Recording category for the 9th Annual Grammy Awards.

== History ==
=== Foundation (1966) ===
The original version of the New Vaudeville Band was an assemblage of studio musicians, specifically gathered by Geoff Stephens to record the song "Winchester Cathedral", which he both wrote and produced. The record sold over three million copies worldwide, earning the RIAA certification of gold disc status. The track also won a Grammy Award for Best Contemporary Song in 1967. The lead vocal was sung by John Carter, formerly of the Ivy League, who had sung on the demo of the song, which Stephens decided to keep for the commercial release.

=== Assembling the continuing band (1966) ===
When Stephens received several requests for the New Vaudeville Band to tour and to record an album, he had to put together a group, for the song had been recorded by session musicians hired only for the recording. He contacted the Bonzo Dog Doo-Dah Band, which played similar music at the time. Only Bob Kerr from that group was interested, so he left the Bonzos in order to help Stephens form a touring version of the New Vaudeville Band, which included original session drummer Henri Harrison. Meanwhile, John Carter had no interest in continuing with the group as a singer, though he still co-wrote the occasional song with Stephens for use by the group. The new lead singer of the group was Alan Klein, who was billed as 'Tristam, Seventh Earl of Cricklewood'. Klein also wrote some of the group's material. Mick Wilsher, on guitars, also sang occasional lead vocals. The official line-up as of late 1966 was:

- Alan Klein, billed as Tristam, Seventh Earl of Cricklewood: lead singer
- 'Moody' Mick Wilsher: guitar, vocals
- Stan Haywood (aka Stanley K. Wood): piano
- 'Mad' Henri Harrison: drums, spoons, washboard, percussion and effects
- Robert 'Pops' Kerr: trumpet, multiple instruments
- Neil Korner: bass
- Hugh 'Shuggy' Watts: tromboneDev Douglas
- DaveSoars
- Alan Clarke
- Rob Pearse

Stephens was not officially part of the group, but produced and arranged their recordings, wrote or co-wrote much of the original material, and selected the cover tunes that the group played.

An initial long-playing album by this line-up was issued in late 1966 by Fontana Records, also titled Winchester Cathedral. This album contained the Geoff Stephens/Les Reed composition "There's A Kind Of Hush", which was quickly covered by Herman's Hermits who had a hit with the song in most of the world in early 1967. However, the New Vaudeville Band version of the tune was issued as a single in Australia and South Africa, and became a significant chart hit in both those territories.

=== Continued success and break up (1967–68) ===
A little later in 1967 the New Vaudeville Band released the Finchley Central album, which was rejigged slightly and retitled On Tour in the US. (The albums shared nine tracks; the US version dropped three tracks and added two others). Both albums contained the single "Peek-A-Boo", which made the Billboard chart that February and reached No. 7 in the UK Singles Chart. The line-up fluctuated somewhat around this time, as Chris Eedy (on bass and tuba) replaced Korner, and trombonist Watts was replaced by a trombonist allegedly named Charles Obscure.

A further UK and US hit followed with "Finchley Central" (No. 11 UK, No. 102 US), and then the UK-only hit "Green Street Green" (No. 37), both based on locations in London. "Green Street Green" also scraped the lowest rungs of the Australian chart at No. 92, tracked as a two-sided hit with the charting B-side being a cover of "Thoroughly Modern Millie".

The New Vaudeville Band was managed by Peter Grant. Kerr left the group following disputes with Grant; he then formed his own group, Bob Kerr's Whoopee Band.

"Green Street Green" was the band's final hit. A further single ("The Bonnie and Clyde") was issued in 1968, but flopped. After a cameo appearance in the film The Bliss of Mrs. Blossom, the band quietly broke up.

=== Revival (1970s/1980s) ===
Drummer Henri Harrison led a revived version of the New Vaudeville Band in the 1970s and 1980s. Ian Carfrae acted as arranger and de facto musical director; Geoff Stephens had no involvement with this iteration of the band, and no other previous members were involved. Many of the band's recordings now consisted of re-arranging then-contemporary hits (e.g. ABBA's "Thank You For The Music", Elton John's "Goodbye Yellow Brick Road") into a distinctively 1920s style.

This revived version of the group recorded four albums and several singles, though none of them charted. The 1970s/1980s version of the New Vaudeville Band consisted of:

- Paul G. T. Wright: lead vocals, guitars, banjo
- Robert Lewis Hay-Smythe: guitar, bass guitar, backing vocals
- Ian Carfrae (also billed as Ian Ffortescue-Carfrae): keyboards, sax, clarinet, arrangements
- Henri Harrison: drums, spoons, washboard, percussion and effects
- Martin Roke: trombone
- Kenneth "Flash" Bache: trumpet

This line-up recorded the 1974 album, The World Of the New Vaudeville Band. Roke was replaced by David "Jock" Batchelor on trombone for the privately released album, While We Are All Assembled!, which did not bear a date but was apparently released circa 1978. The sleeve notes for this release state that the band "have firmly re-established themselves in the higher echelons of the British club scene" since returning four years previously from "their successful three years in the USA and Canada". This same line-up also issued a live LP around the same time.

A further album entitled The Best Of the New Vaudeville Band appeared in 1979, consisting of new recordings and a few re-recordings of the 1960s hits. By this time Steve Shaw (trombone, keyboards, congas, backing vocals) had replaced Batchelor. Bache dropped out for the final album, Vaudeville, issued in 1981. The revived version of the New Vaudeville Band broke up in 1988.

== Discography ==
=== Studio albums ===
- Winchester Cathedral (1966)
- Finchley Central (titled There's a Kind of Hush in South Africa; US version On Tour shares 9 tracks) (1967)
- The World of the New Vaudeville Band (1974)
- While We Are All Assembled! (1978)
- The Best of the New Vaudeville Band (1979)
- Vaudeville (1981)

=== Singles ===
Title	Release	Peak chart positions					Album
Title	Release	UK	AUS	CAN	SA	US	Album
"Winchester Cathedral"	1966	4	1	1	1	1	Winchester Cathedral
"Peek-a-Boo"	1967	7	10	53	—	72	On Tour (US) / Finchley Central (UK)
"There's a Kind of Hush"	1967	—	12	—	2	—	Winchester Cathedral
"Finchley Central"	1967	11	42	—	14	102	On Tour (US) / Finchley Central (UK)
"Green Street Green"	1967	37	92	—	—	—	Non-LP single
"Thoroughly Modern Millie"	1967	—	92	—	—	—	On Tour (US)
"The Bonnie and Clyde"	1968	—	—	—	—	122	Non-LP single
"Dear Rita Hayworth"	1973	—	—	—	—	—	The World of the New Vaudeville Band
"At Last"	1976	—	—	—	—	—	Non-LP single
"Thank You for the Music"	1978	—	—	—	—	—	The Best of the New Vaudeville Band
