= Sweet Pea (song) =

Single by Tommy Roe

from the album Sweet Pea
- B-side: "Much More Love"
- Released: 1966
- Genre: Bubblegum pop
- Length: 2:19
- Label: ABC Records 10762
- Songwriter: Tommy Roe
- Producer: Gary S. Paxton

Tommy Roe singles chronology
"Doesn't Anybody Know My Name (Two-Ten, Six-Eighteen)" (1965)	"Sweet Pea" (1966)	"Hooray for Hazel" (1966)

"Sweet Pea" is a bubblegum pop song written and performed by Tommy Roe. It was produced by Gary S. Paxton and featured on his 1966 album, Sweet Pea. In the lyrics, the singer spots a girl at a dance whom her friends call "Sweet Pea." There's no explanation of how she got this nickname. After dancing with her, he suggests they go for a walk where he tells her he loves her and wants her to be his girl.

The song contains a drum break saturated in reverb at the start of the recording and each time before the song modulates to a new key.

== Chart performance ==
The song reached number 1 in Canada, number 1 in New Zealand, number 7 in Australia, and number 8 on the Billboard Hot 100 in 1966. It ranked number 44 on Billboard magazine's Top Hot 100 songs of 1966.

== Other versions ==
- The Ventures included an instrumental version on their 1966 album, Wild Things!
- Roger Williams made it the B-side to his single "Love Me Forever" in April 1967.
- Friar Tuck recorded it as the B-side to his single "Alley-Oop" in May 1967.
- Manfred Mann released it as a single in May 1967 that reached number 36 in the United Kingdom.
- Donald Lautrec put out a single in 1967.
- Gang Starr sampled Roe's version on their 1989 song "Movin' On" from the album No More Mr. Nice Guy.
- Big Audio Dynamite's song "Rush" samples the drum break from Roe's "Sweet Pea".
- The 2007 re-release of Cub's 1993 album Betti-Cola featured a cover of the song.

== In media ==
- Samantha Morton performs a frenetic dance to the tune in the 1999 film Jesus' Son.
- The song is also played in the background in two episodes of the Hulu drama mini series, The Girl from Plainville (2022).
