= Tommy Roe =

American rock and pop singer-songwriter (born 1942)

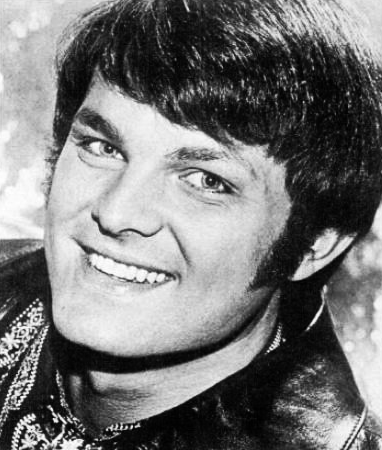
- Roe in 1970

Background information
- Born: Thomas David Roe; May 9, 1942 (age 84); Atlanta, Georgia, U.S.
- Genres: Rock and roll; pop; bubblegum
- Occupations: Singer, songwriter
- Instruments: Vocals, guitar
- Years active: 1959–2018, 2022–present
- Labels: Judd Records, ABC Paramount Records, Monument Records, MGM Records, His Master's Voice
- Website: tommyroe.com

Thomas David Roe (born May 9, 1942) is an American rock and pop singer-songwriter.

Best-remembered for his hits "Sheila" (1962), "Sweet Pea" (1966) and "Dizzy" (1969), Roe was "widely perceived as one of the archetypal bubblegum artists of the late 1960s, but cut some pretty decent rockers along the way, especially early in his career," wrote the AllMusic journalist Bill Dahl.

== Biography ==
Roe was born and raised in Atlanta, Georgia, United States, where he attended Brown High School. After graduating, he landed a job at General Electric soldering wires.

Tommy Roe first recorded his original song "Sheila" in 1960 for Jud Phillips's Judd label. "I wrote this poem for a girl I had a crush on in high school, and her name was Freda," recalled Roe in 2015. "[Jud Phillips said,] 'Son, I like that song but we gotta do somethin' about that title.' So he sent me home and Aunt Sheila was visiting that weekend. The rest is history!" The Judd single, misspelled "Shelia" and credited to "Tommy Roe and the Satins," is simpler than the more famous hit, with a standard lead vocal, rhythm combo, and backing chorus. It was a regional hit but did not chart nationally.

Roe re-recorded the song for ABC-Paramount in 1962, with a new hook: an insistent drum paradiddle modeled on the 1957 hit "Peggy Sue". Roe's slight Southern accent and his interpolation of a hiccup in the vocal invited comparisons with Buddy Holly.

This was deliberate, according to Roe: "Felton [producer Felton Jarvis] said, 'We're gonna do it different. You know there's a vacuum left of Buddy Holly. There are still a lot of Buddy Holly fans out there so we need to draw attention to you, so I'm gonna put Buddy Holly drums on "Sheila."' I wasn't really crazy about that whole idea because I was a big fan of Buddy Holly's and I felt like we were sponging off of him and his whole sound." The new arrangement of "Sheila" became a Billboard number 1 hit in the U.S. and Australia in 1962. A buildup of global sales of "Sheila" meant that the Recording Industry Association of America did not present the gold record until 1969. When "Sheila" became a hit in 1962, ABC-Paramount asked him to go on tour to promote the hit. He was reluctant to give up his secure job at GE until ABC-Paramount advanced him $5,000.

However, in March 1963, the UK music magazine NME reported that he and Chris Montez had both been upstaged by the Beatles and their fans on a 21-day UK tour. Late that year, Roe scored a Top 10 hit with "Everybody", which reached US number 3 and UK number 9, and "The Folk Singer" (number 4 UK) written by Merle Kilgore was also popular.

Following a more successful tour of the United Kingdom by his friend Roy Orbison, Roe toured there and then moved to England where he lived for several years. In 1964, Roe recorded a song written by Buzz Cason entitled "Diane From Manchester Square", about a girl who worked at EMI House when it was based in London's Manchester Square. Sales of this single in the UK were poor, and it failed to chart. During the 1960s, he had several more Top 40 hits, including 1966's "Sweet Pea" (number 8 U.S., number 1 Canada) and "Hooray for Hazel" (number 6 U.S., number 2 Canada).

In 1969, his song "Dizzy" went to number 1 on the U.S. Billboard Hot 100, number 1 on the UK Singles Chart, and number 1 in Canada. This transatlantic chart-topper sold two million copies by mid-April 1969, giving him his third gold disc award.

Roe guest-starred in an episode of the American sitcom Green Acres, titled "The Four of Spades", airing on November 8, 1969.

His final Top 10 single, a track co-written with Freddy Weller, titled "Jam Up and Jelly Tight", became his fourth gold record, peaking at number 8 in the U.S. and number 5 in Canada in 1970.

Although his style of music declined in popularity with the 1970s mass market, Roe maintained a following and continued to perform at a variety of concert venues, sometimes with 1960s nostalgia rock and rollers such as Freddy Cannon and Bobby Vee. He recorded numerous singles in the late 1970s and 1980s aimed at the country music market. In 1986, Roe was inducted into the Georgia Music Hall of Fame, and his pioneering contribution to the genre has been recognized by the Rockabilly Hall of Fame.

Roe's autobiography, originally published in 2016, named From Cabbagetown to Tinseltown and places in between, was co-written with Michael Robert Krikorian.

On February 7, 2018, Roe officially announced his retirement on his Facebook page with this statement:

Today I am announcing my retirement. I have so many great memories of the music and of my fans who have supported me through the years. Fifty five years to be exact. What a gift it has been for me to share this time with you. I hope my music will continue to bring a smile to your hearts and joy to your life. ...I will stay in touch through our Facebook page. But for now I am stepping out of the spotlight from scheduled concerts and interviews. Thank you again for your loyal support. I love you all, and may God Bless you. Tommy

On May 2, 2022, Roe released a new single titled "80" to commemorate his 80th birthday. Roe also appeared as a guest on several oldies-oriented podcasts throughout 2022 and 2023 to discuss his music career.

On January 5, 2023, Roe released a new album titled From Here to Here on the independent label Solar Music. In a February 2023 interview with Goldmine, Roe officially confirmed his return to music, stating "Yes, I’m still at it. It is something that I love doing and it is part of my DNA. I have to do it. I guess I will carry on until I can’t do it anymore." On April 16, 2023, Roe announced concert dates for Nashville on May 9 and Holmdel on June 8, his first live performances since the 2018 retirement announcement.

== Personal life ==
A resident of Atlanta, Georgia, and Beverly Hills, California, he was married to actress Josette Banzet until her death in 2020.

== Discography ==
- Sheila (1962)
- Everybody Likes Tommy Roe (1963)
- Something for Everybody (1964)
- Sweet Pea (1966)
- Phantasy (1967)
- It's Now Winter's Day (1967)
- Heather Honey (1969)
- Dizzy (1969)
- We Can Make Music (1970)
- Beginnings (1971)
- Energy (1976)
- Full Bloom (1977)
- Devil's Soul Pile (2012)
- Confectioner's (2017)
- From Here to Here (2023)

== Legacy ==
- The Beatles' bootleg album Live! at the Star-Club in Hamburg, Germany; 1962, which was recorded (in very low fidelity) in Hamburg in 1962, shortly before they became an international phenomenon, included a version of "Sheila".
- "Sweet Pea" is sampled in the song "Lyte As A Rock", appearing on the 1988 album Lyte As A Rock by American rapper MC Lyte.
- In 1991, The Wonder Stuff and Vic Reeves released a cover of "Dizzy" that topped the UK Singles Chart.

== See also ==
- List of artists who reached number one in the United States
- List of artists who reached number one on the UK Singles Chart
- List of acts who appeared on American Bandstand
- List of performers on Top of the Pops
- The History of Rock & Roll
- Where the Action Is
- List of people from Georgia (U.S. state)
