= Billboard Year-End Hot 100 singles of 1965 =

Ranking of recorded music

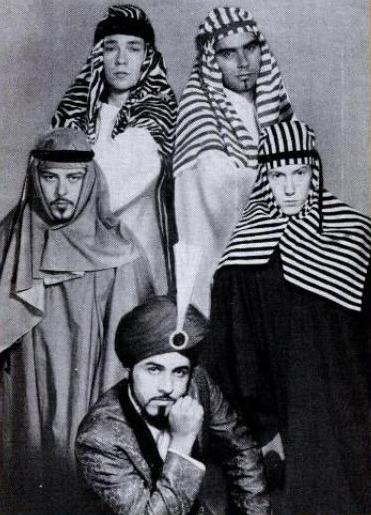
"Wooly Bully" by Sam the Sham and the Pharaohs was the number one song of 1965

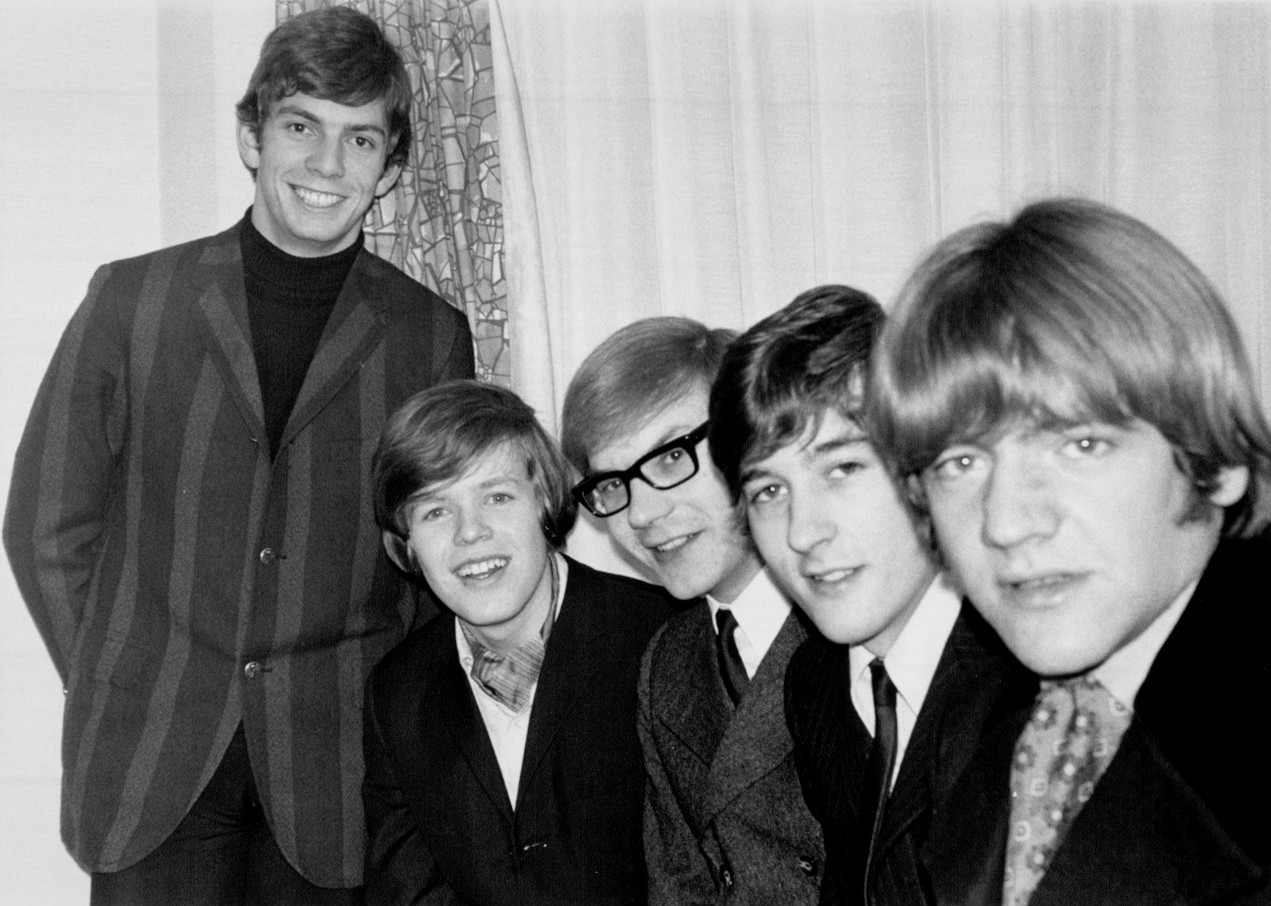
Herman's Hermits had five songs on the Year-End Hot 100, the most of any artist in 1965.

This is a list of Billboard magazine's Top Hot 100 songs of 1965. The Top 100, as revealed in the year-end edition of Billboard dated December 25, 1965, is based on Hot 100 charts from the issue dates of January 2 through October 30, 1965.

No.	Title	Artist(s)
1	"Wooly Bully"	Sam the Sham and the Pharaohs
2	"I Can't Help Myself (Sugar Pie Honey Bunch)"	Four Tops
3	"(I Can't Get No) Satisfaction"	The Rolling Stones
4	"You Were on My Mind"	We Five
5	"You've Lost That Lovin' Feelin'"	The Righteous Brothers
6	"Downtown"	Petula Clark
7	"Help!"	The Beatles
8	"Can't You Hear My Heartbeat"	Herman's Hermits
9	"Crying in the Chapel"	Elvis Presley
10	"My Girl"	The Temptations
11	"Help Me, Rhonda"	The Beach Boys
12	"King of the Road"	Roger Miller
13	"The Birds and the Bees"	Jewel Akens
14	"Hold Me, Thrill Me, Kiss Me"	Mel Carter
15	"Shotgun"	Junior Walker & the All Stars
16	"I Got You Babe"	Sonny & Cher
17	"This Diamond Ring"	Gary Lewis & the Playboys
18	"The 'In' Crowd"	Ramsey Lewis Trio
19	"Mrs. Brown, You've Got a Lovely Daughter"	Herman's Hermits
20	"Stop! In the Name of Love"	The Supremes
21	"Unchained Melody"	The Righteous Brothers
22	"Silhouettes"	Herman's Hermits
23	"I'll Never Find Another You"	The Seekers
24	"Cara Mia"	Jay and the Americans
25	"Mr. Tambourine Man"	The Byrds
26	"Cast Your Fate to the Wind"	Sounds Orchestral
27	"Yes, I'm Ready"	Barbara Mason
28	"What's New Pussycat?"	Tom Jones
29	"Eve of Destruction"	Barry McGuire
30	"Hang On Sloopy"	The McCoys
31	"Ticket to Ride"	The Beatles
32	"Red Roses for a Blue Lady"	Bert Kaempfert
33	"Papa's Got a Brand New Bag"	James Brown
34	"Game of Love"	Wayne Fontana & The Mindbenders
35	"The Name Game"	Shirley Ellis
36	"I Know a Place"	Petula Clark
37	"Back in My Arms Again"	The Supremes
38	"Baby I'm Yours"	Barbara Lewis
39	"The Jolly Green Giant"	The Kingsmen
40	"Hush, Hush, Sweet Charlotte"	Patti Page
41	"Like a Rolling Stone"	Bob Dylan
42	"I'm Telling You Now"	Freddie and the Dreamers
43	"Ferry Cross the Mersey"	Gerry and the Pacemakers
44	"Just Once in My Life"	The Righteous Brothers
45	"The Seventh Son"	Johnny Rivers
46	"I'm Henry the Eighth, I Am"	Herman's Hermits
47	"A Walk in the Black Forest"	Horst Jankowski
48	"For Your Love"	The Yardbirds
49	"California Girls"	The Beach Boys
50	"Go Now"	The Moody Blues
51	"Goldfinger"	Shirley Bassey
52	"Down in the Boondocks"	Billy Joe Royal
53	"Baby the Rain Must Fall"	Glenn Yarbrough
54	"Catch Us If You Can"	The Dave Clark Five
55	"Eight Days a Week"	The Beatles
56	"Just a Little"	The Beau Brummels
57	"You Turn Me On"	Ian Whitcomb
58	"I'll Be Doggone"	Marvin Gaye
59	"Save Your Heart for Me"	Gary Lewis & the Playboys
60	"Tired of Waiting for You"	The Kinks
61	"Count Me In"	Gary Lewis & the Playboys
62	"All Day and All of the Night"	The Kinks
63	"What the World Needs Now Is Love"	Jackie DeShannon
64	"It's Not Unusual"	Tom Jones
65	"She's About a Mover"	Sir Douglas Quintet
66	"Shake"	Sam Cooke
67	"Wonderful World"	Herman's Hermits
68	"Nowhere to Run"	Martha and the Vandellas
69	"Heart Full of Soul"	The Yardbirds
70	"Love Potion No. 9"	The Searchers
71	"Laurie (Strange Things Happen)"	Dickey Lee
72	"Baby Don't Go"	Sonny & Cher
73	"It Ain't Me Babe"	The Turtles
74	"Tell Her No"	The Zombies
75	"I Go to Pieces"	Peter and Gordon
76	"Red Roses for a Blue Lady"	Vic Dana
77	"Don't Just Stand There"	Patty Duke
78	"The Tracks of My Tears"	The Miracles
79	"Too Many Rivers"	Brenda Lee
80	"I Like It Like That"	The Dave Clark Five
81	"Little Things"	Bobby Goldsboro
82	"True Love Ways"	Peter and Gordon
83	"It's the Same Old Song"	Four Tops
84	"You've Got Your Troubles"	The Fortunes
85	"Hold What You've Got"	Joe Tex
86	"We Gotta Get Out of This Place"	The Animals
87	"Laugh, Laugh"	The Beau Brummels
88	"The Last Time"	The Rolling Stones
89	"Do You Believe in Magic"	The Lovin' Spoonful
90	"All I Really Want to Do"	Cher
91	"Take Me Back"	Little Anthony and the Imperials
92	"I Want Candy"	The Strangeloves
93	"Ooo Baby Baby"	The Miracles
94	"Laugh at Me"	Sonny
95	"Treat Her Right"	Roy Head
96	"The Race Is On"	Jack Jones
97	"I'm a Fool"	Dino, Desi & Billy
98	"The Boy from New York City"	The Ad Libs
99	"Keep Searchin' (We'll Follow the Sun)"	Del Shannon
100	"How Sweet It Is (To Be Loved by You)"	Marvin Gaye

1965 singles which do not feature in the year-end Top 100 but which charted strongly between the unusually early October 30 cut-off and the end of the year include the number ones "Yesterday", "Get Off of My Cloud", "I Hear a Symphony", "Turn! Turn! Turn! (To Everything There Is a Season)" and "Over and Over". Plus the Top Tens "A Lover's Concerto", "Keep on Dancing", "Just a Little Bit Better", "Everybody Loves a Clown", "Positively 4th Street", "You're the One" (the Vogues), "1–2–3", "Rescue Me", "A Taste of Honey", "Let's Hang On", "Ain't That Peculiar", "I Got You (I Feel Good)", "I Can Never Go Home Anymore", "England Swings", "Make the World Go Away" and "Fever" (the McCoys).

== See also ==
- 1965 in music
- List of Billboard Hot 100 number-one singles of 1965
- List of Billboard Hot 100 top-ten singles in 1965
