= List of Billboard Hot 100 top-ten singles in 1965 =

This is a list of singles that peaked in the top 10 of the Billboard Hot 100 during 1965.

The Beatles and Herman's Hermits each had six top-ten hits in 1965, tying them for the most top-ten hits during the year.

== Top-ten singles ==
- (#) – 1965 Year-end top 10 single position and rank

Top ten entry date	Single	Artist(s)	Peak	Peak date	Weeks in top ten
Singles from 1964
December 26	"The Jerk"	The Larks	7	January 16	5
Singles from 1965
January 2	"Love Potion No. 9"	The Searchers	3	January 16	6
January 2	"Amen"	The Impressions	7	January 9	2
January 2	"The Wedding"	Julie Rogers	10	January 2	2
January 9	"Downtown" (#6)	Petula Clark	1	January 23	9
January 9	"You've Lost That Lovin' Feelin'" (#5)	The Righteous Brothers	1	February 6	9
January 16	"How Sweet It Is (To Be Loved by You)"	Marvin Gaye	6	January 30	4
January 16	"Keep Searchin' (We'll Follow the Sun)"	Del Shannon	9	January 30	3
January 23	"The Name Game"	Shirley Ellis	3	January 30	5
January 30	"This Diamond Ring"	Gary Lewis & the Playboys	1	February 20	9
January 30	"Hold What You've Got"	Joe Tex	5	January 30	3
January 30	"All Day and All of the Night"	The Kinks	7	February 6	4
February 6	"My Girl" (#10)	The Temptations	1	March 6	8
February 6	"Shake"	Sam Cooke	7	February 27	4
February 13	"The Jolly Green Giant"	The Kingsmen	4	March 6	5
February 13	"I Go to Pieces"	Peter and Gordon	9	February 20	3
February 20	"The Boy from New York City"	The Ad Libs	8	February 27	2
February 27	"King of the Road"	Roger Miller	4	March 20	7
February 27	"Tell Her No"	The Zombies	6	February 27	2
March 6	"Eight Days a Week"	The Beatles	1	March 13	5
March 6	"The Birds and the Bees"	Jewel Akens	3	March 20	6
March 6	"Ferry Cross the Mersey"	Gerry and the Pacemakers	6	March 20	4
March 13	"Stop! In the Name of Love"	The Supremes	1	March 27	8
March 13	"Can't You Hear My Heartbeat" (#8)	Herman's Hermits	2	March 27	6
March 13	"Hurt So Bad"	Little Anthony and the Imperials	10	March 13	1
March 20	"Shotgun"	Junior Walker & the All Stars	4	April 3	6
March 20	"Goldfinger"	Shirley Bassey	8	March 27	3
April 3	"I'm Telling You Now"	Freddie and the Dreamers	1	April 10	6
April 3	"Nowhere to Run"	Martha and the Vandellas	8	April 10	3
April 3	"Red Roses for a Blue Lady"	Vic Dana	10	April 3	2
April 10	"Game of Love"	Wayne Fontana and The Mindbenders	1	April 24	5
April 10	"I Know a Place"	Petula Clark	3	May 1	6
April 17	"Tired of Waiting for You"	The Kinks	6	April 24	3
April 17	"The Clapping Song"	Shirley Ellis	8	April 24	2
April 17	"Go Now"	The Moody Blues	10	April 17	1
April 24	"Mrs. Brown, You've Got a Lovely Daughter"	Herman's Hermits	1	May 1	7
April 24	"I'll Never Find Another You"	The Seekers	4	May 15	6
April 24	"Silhouettes"	Herman's Hermits	5	May 15	5
May 1	"Count Me In"	Gary Lewis & the Playboys	2	May 8	5
May 1	"The Last Time"	The Rolling Stones	9	May 1	2
May 8	"Ticket to Ride"	The Beatles	1	May 22	6
May 8	"Cast Your Fate to the Wind"	Sounds Orchestral	10	May 8	1
May 15	"Help Me, Rhonda"	The Beach Boys	1	May 29	7
May 15	"Wooly Bully" (#1)	Sam the Sham & the Pharaohs	2	June 5	9
May 15	"I'll Be Doggone"	Marvin Gaye	8	May 15	1
May 15	"Just Once in My Life"	The Righteous Brothers	9	May 15	2
May 22	"Back in My Arms Again"	The Supremes	1	June 12	5
May 22	"Crying in the Chapel" (#9)	Elvis Presley	3	June 12	7
May 29	"Just a Little"	The Beau Brummels	8	June 5	3
May 29	"It's Not Unusual"	Tom Jones	10	May 29	2
June 5	"I Can't Help Myself (Sugar Pie Honey Bunch)" (#2)	Four Tops	1	June 19	10
June 5	"Engine Engine Number 9"	Roger Miller	7	June 12	3
June 12	"Mr. Tambourine Man"	The Byrds	1	June 26	7
June 12	"Wonderful World"	Herman's Hermits	4	July 10	5
June 19	"For Your Love"	The Yardbirds	6	July 3	3
June 19	"Hush, Hush, Sweet Charlotte"	Patti Page	8	June 26	2
June 26	"(I Can't Get No) Satisfaction" (#3)	The Rolling Stones	1	July 10	9
June 26	"The Seventh Son"	Johnny Rivers	7	July 3	6
July 3	"Yes, I'm Ready"	Barbara Mason	5	July 31	6
July 3	"What the World Needs Now Is Love"	Jackie DeShannon	7	July 24	5
July 10	"Cara Mia"	Jay and the Americans	4	July 31	5
July 10	"You Turn Me On"	Ian Whitcomb and Bluesville	8	July 17	3
July 17	"I'm Henry VIII, I Am"	Herman's Hermits	1	August 7	6
July 17	"What's New Pussycat?"	Tom Jones	3	July 31	5
July 31	"Save Your Heart for Me"	Gary Lewis & the Playboys	2	August 21	5
July 31	"I Like It Like That"	The Dave Clark Five	7	August 7	2
August 7	"I Got You Babe"	Sonny & Cher	1	August 14	7
August 7	"Don't Just Stand There"	Patty Duke	8	August 14	3
August 14	"California Girls"	The Beach Boys	3	August 28	5
August 14	"Unchained Melody"	The Righteous Brothers	4	August 28	5
August 14	"It's the Same Old Song"	Four Tops	5	August 28	4
August 14	"Down in the Boondocks"	Billy Joe Royal	9	August 28	3
August 21	"Help!" (#7)	The Beatles	1	September 4	6
August 28	"Like a Rolling Stone"	Bob Dylan	2	September 4	5
August 28	"Hold Me, Thrill Me, Kiss Me"	Mel Carter	8	August 28	2
August 28	"Papa's Got a Brand New Bag"	James Brown	8	September 4	3
September 4	"Eve of Destruction"	Barry McGuire	1	September 25	7
September 4	"You Were on My Mind" (#4)	We Five	3	September 25	6
September 11	"The 'In' Crowd"	Ramsey Lewis Trio	5	October 9	6
September 11	"It Ain't Me Babe"	The Turtles	8	September 18	3
September 18	"Hang On Sloopy"	The McCoys	1	October 2	7
September 18	"Catch Us If You Can"	The Dave Clark Five	4	September 25	4
September 18	"Heart Full of Soul"	The Yardbirds	9	September 25	2
September 25	"Laugh at Me"	Sonny	10	September 25	2
October 2	"Yesterday"	The Beatles	1	October 9	6
October 2	"Treat Her Right"	Roy Head and the Traits	2	October 16	5
October 2	"You've Got Your Troubles"	The Fortunes	7	October 9	2
October 2	"Baby Don't Go"	Sonny & Cher	8	October 9	3
October 9	"Do You Believe in Magic"	The Lovin' Spoonful	9	October 16	2
October 16	"A Lover's Concerto"	The Toys	2	October 30	6
October 16	"Keep on Dancing"	The Gentrys	4	October 30	4
October 16	"Just a Little Bit Better"	Herman's Hermits	7	October 16	2
October 23	"Get Off of My Cloud"	The Rolling Stones	1	November 6	6
October 23	"Everybody Loves a Clown"	Gary Lewis & the Playboys	4	November 6	4
October 23	"You're the One"	The Vogues	4	November 13	5
October 23	"Positively 4th Street"	Bob Dylan	7	November 6	3
October 30	"1-2-3"	Len Barry	2	November 20	7
November 6	"Rescue Me"	Fontella Bass	4	November 20	6
November 6	"A Taste of Honey"	Herb Alpert & the Tijuana Brass	7	November 27	6
November 13	"I Hear a Symphony"	The Supremes	1	November 20	6
November 13	"Let's Hang On!"	The Four Seasons	3	December 11	8
November 13	"Ain't That Peculiar"	Marvin Gaye	8	November 20	4
November 20	"Turn! Turn! Turn! (To Everything There Is a Season)"	The Byrds	1	December 4	8
November 27	"I Got You (I Feel Good)"	James Brown	3	December 18	7
November 27	"You've Got to Hide Your Love Away"	The Silkie	10	November 27	1
December 4	"Over and Over"	The Dave Clark Five	1	December 25	6
December 4	"I Can Never Go Home Anymore"	The Shangri-Las	6	December 11	4
December 11	"I Will"	Dean Martin	10	December 11	2
December 18	"Make the World Go Away"	Eddy Arnold	6	December 25	3
December 18	"Fever"	The McCoys	7	December 25	3
December 18	"England Swings"	Roger Miller	8	December 18	3

=== 1964 peaks ===
List of Billboard Hot 100 top ten singles in 1965 which peaked in 1964
Top ten entry date	Single	Artist(s)	Peak	Peak date	Weeks in top ten
November 14	"She's Not There"	The Zombies	2	December 12	8
November 28	"Mr. Lonely"	Bobby Vinton	1	December 12	9
December 5	"Come See About Me"	The Supremes	1	December 19	9
December 12	"I Feel Fine"	The Beatles	1	December 26	7
December 19	"Goin' Out of My Head"	Little Anthony and the Imperials	6	December 26	5
December 26	"She's a Woman"	The Beatles	4	December 26	2

=== 1966 peaks ===
List of Billboard Hot 100 top ten singles in 1965 which peaked in 1966
Top ten entry date	Single	Artist(s)	Peak	Peak date	Weeks in top ten
December 25	"The Sound of Silence"	Simon & Garfunkel	1	January 1	5
December 25	"Ebb Tide"	The Righteous Brothers	5	January 8	4

== See also ==
- 1965 in music
- List of Billboard Hot 100 number ones of 1965
- Billboard Year-End Hot 100 singles of 1965
