= 1965 in Michigan =

- Decades: 1940s; 1950s; 1960s; 1970s; 1980s
- See also: History of Michigan; Historical outline of Michigan; List of years in Michigan; 1965 in the United States

Events from the year 1965 in Michigan.

The Detroit Free Press (DFP) and United Press International (UPI) each selected lists of the top stories of 1965 in Michigan. Those stories included:

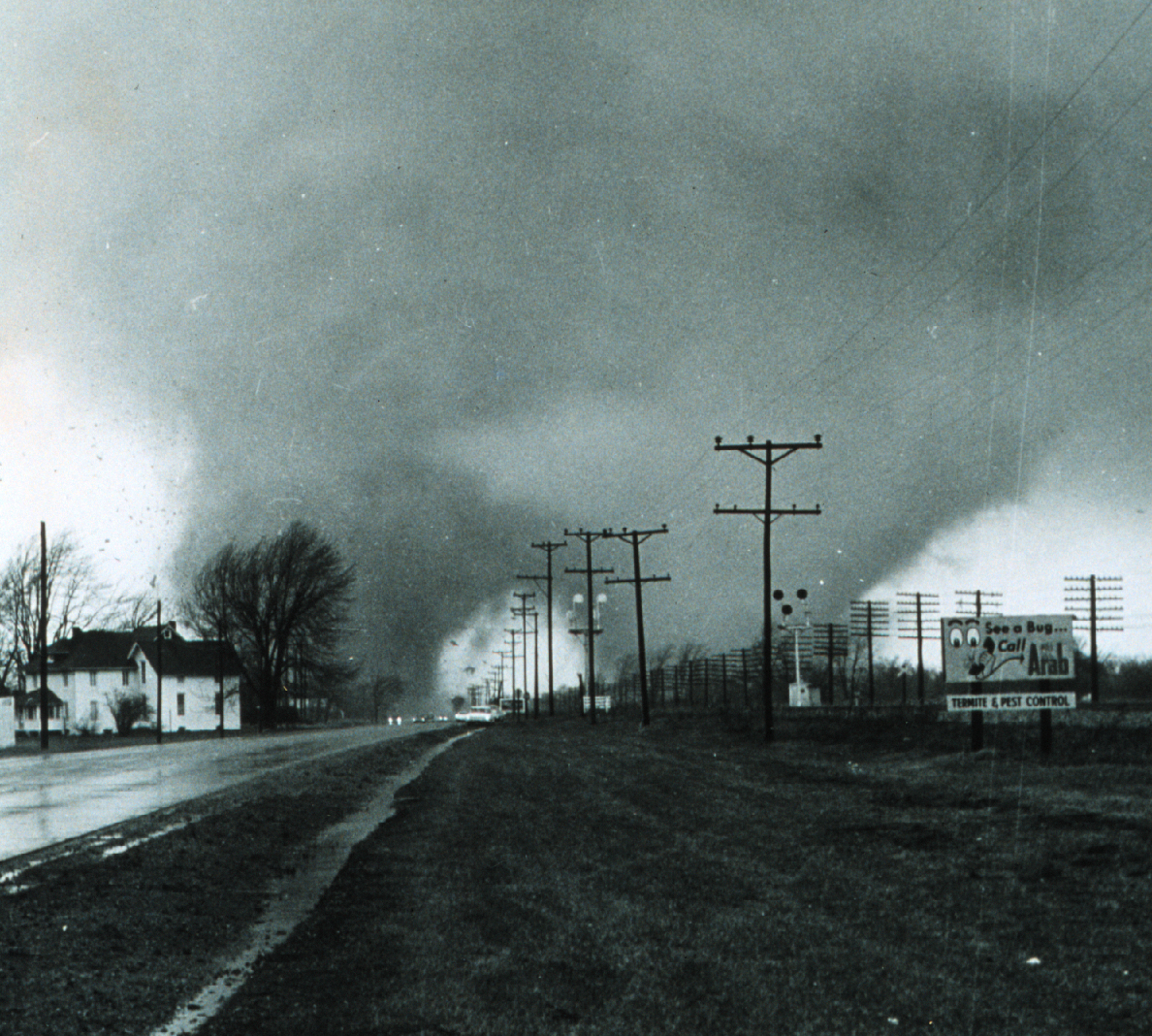
Palm Sunday tornado outbreak

1. The April 11 Palm Sunday tornado outbreak that struck across the Midwest causing 18 deaths in southern Michigan, from Grand Rapids to Milan (DFP-1; UPI-1);
2. The March 25 murder of Viola Liuzzo, a civil rights activist from Detroit, by the Ku Klux Klan in Alabama (DFP-6; UPI-2);
3. The boom in 1965 automobile production, reaching a record high of 11,111,000 vehicles, including 9,331,000 passenger cars (DFP-3, UPI-8);
4. The May 7 sinking of the SS Cedarville in the Straits of Mackinac after it crashed in the fog with another ship (the Topdalsfjord), resulting in the death of 10 crew members (UPI-3);
5. The November 2 Detroit election in which Jerome Cavanagh was re-elected as mayor by a two-to-one margin and Nicholas Hood was elected to become the second African-American Councilman in Detroit history (DFP-2);
6. The political struggle between Republican Gov. George W. Romney and a Michigan Legislature controlled by Democrats (UPI-4);
7. The refusal to seat Daniel West in the Michigan House of Representatives after it was revealed that he lied about being an honors graduate of Yale Law School and concealed an extensive criminal record (UPI-5);
8. The November deaths of three surgery patients at Pontiac Osteopathic Hospital due to mistakes by an anesthetist (DFP-8, UPI-10);
9. The February 19 wedding of Henry Ford II and Cristina Ford (DFP-4); and
10. A February 25 blizzard, the worst since 1929, brought 35 mile-per-hour winds and 10 inches of snow to the Detroit area (DFP-5).

The UPI also rated the top sports stories in the state. The top sports stories were:

1. The 1965 Michigan State Spartans football team that finished the season with a perfect 10–0 record and was ranked No. 1 in the AP and UPI Polls (the Spartans then lost to UCLA in the 1966 Rose Bowl and dropped to No. 2 in the final AP Poll);

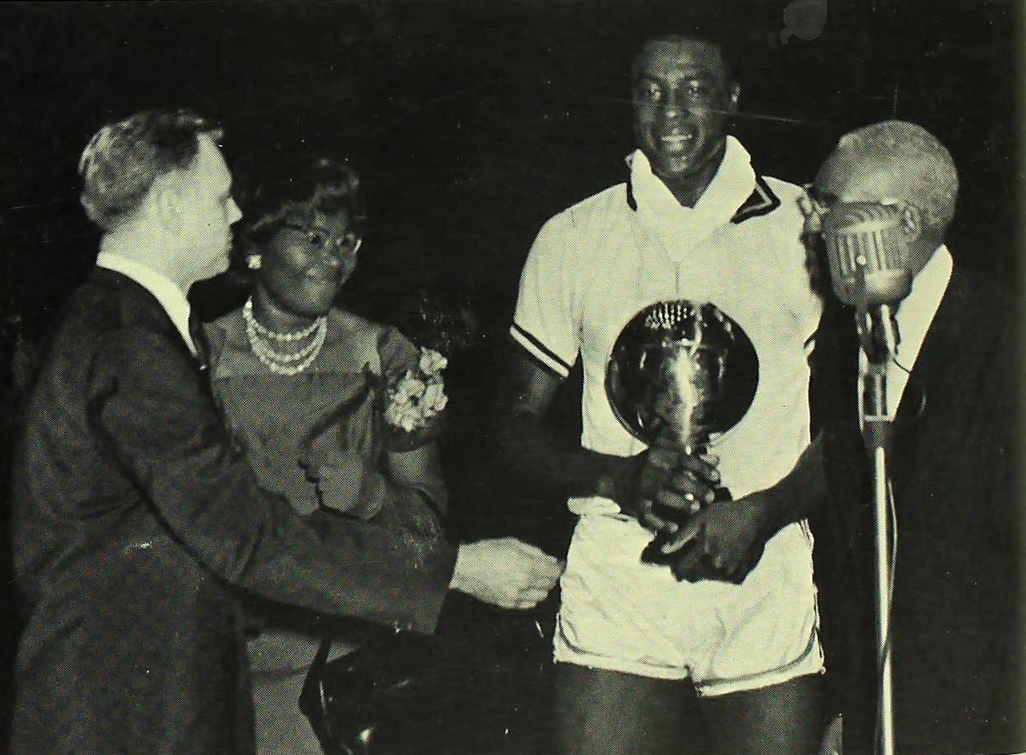
Cazzie Russell accepts Big Ten MVP trophy

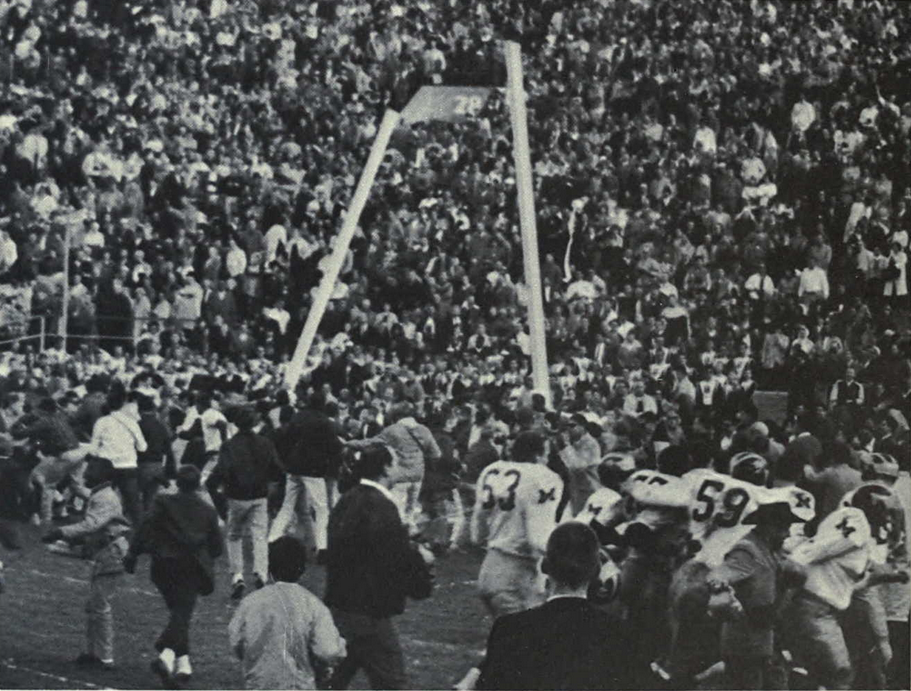
Fans tear down the goal posts after 1965 Rose Bowl

1. The 1964–65 Michigan Wolverines basketball team led by Cazzie Russell that advanced to the Final Four of the NCAA tournament before losing to UCLA in the championship game;
2. The 1964–65 Detroit Red Wings that finished the season with the best record in the National Hockey League (NHL) only to lose in the first round of the playoffs;
3. The victory of the 1964 Michigan Wolverines football team over Oregon State in the 1965 Rose Bowl (the 1964 Wolverines finished at 9–1 and ranked No. 4 in the AP and UPI polls);
4. Benton Harbor and River Rouge repeating as Michigan's Class A and Class B high school basketball champions (the 1965 championship was the fifth straight at the Class B level for River Rouge);
5. The strong hitting of Willie Horton, playing his first full season in the major leagues, during the first half of the 1965 season (in his first 19 games, Horton had a .403 batting average with 9 home runs and 21 RBIs);
6. The Detroit Lions' collapse, dropping to sixth place in the NFL West with a 6–7–1 record;
7. A March 9 heart attack that sidelined Detroit Tigers manager Charlie Dressen for the first part of the 1965 season (Bob Swift took over as manager during Dressen's convalescence);
8. The April 1 firing of Forddy Anderson, head coach of the Michigan State Spartans men's basketball team since 1954, shortly after the 1964–65 team compiled a disastrous 5–18 record (1–13 in conference play); and
9. A disappointing year for the 1964–65 Detroit Pistons, finishing in fourth place in the NBA Western Division with a 31–49 record.

In music, Detroit's Motown record label was at a peak of its prominence with numerous national hit records in 1965, including: "My Girl" by The Temptations; "Stop! In the Name of Love", "Back in My Arms Again", and "I Hear a Symphony" by The Supremes; "Nowhere to Run" by Martha and the Vandellas; "The Tracks of My Tears" and "Ooo Baby Baby" by The Miracles; "It's the Same Old Song" and "I Can't Help Myself" by the Four Tops; "Uptight" by Stevie Wonder; "How Sweet It Is" by Marvin Gaye; and "Don't Mess with Bill" by The Marvelettes.

== Office holders ==
=== State office holders ===
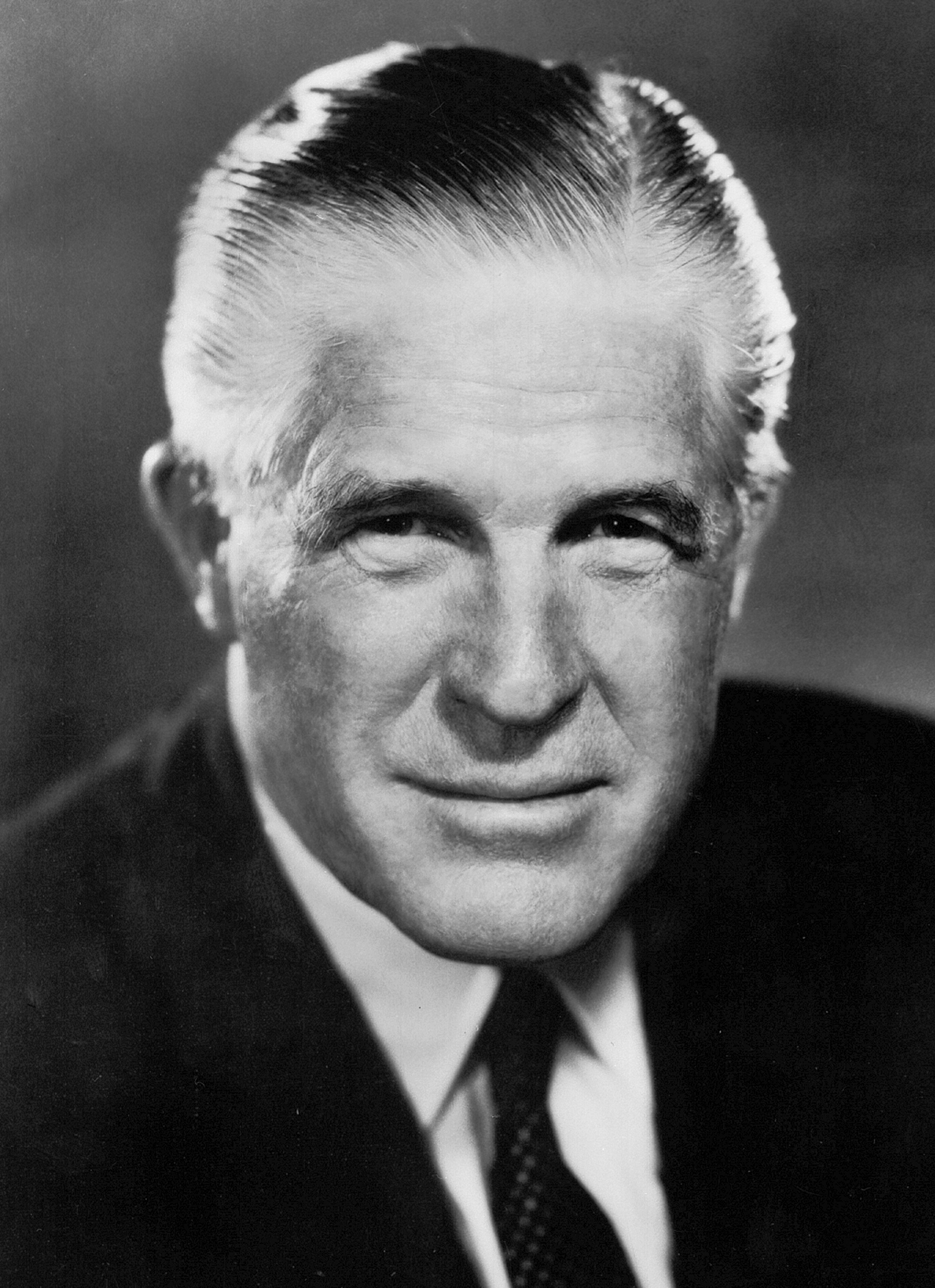
Gov. Romney

- Governor of Michigan: George W. Romney (Republican)
- Lieutenant Governor of Michigan: William Milliken (Republican)
- Michigan Attorney General: Frank J. Kelley (Democrat)
- Michigan Secretary of State: James M. Hare (Democrat)
- Speaker of the Michigan House of Representatives: Joseph J. Kowalski (Democrat)
- Majority Leader of the Michigan Senate: Raymond D. Dzendzel (Democrat)
- Chief Justice, Michigan Supreme Court: Thomas M. Kavanagh

=== Mayors of major cities ===
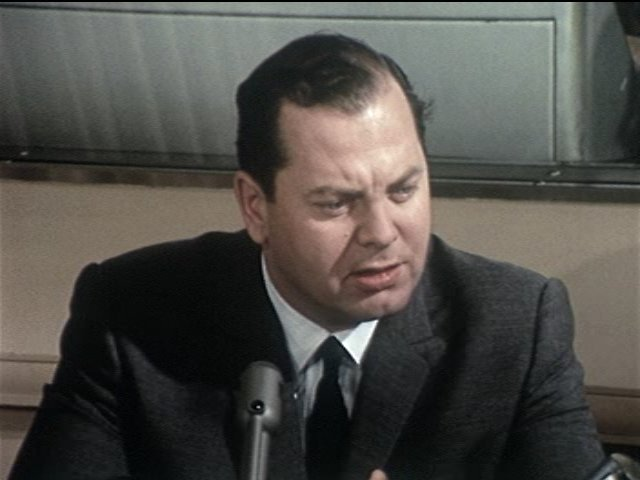
Mayor Cavanagh

- Mayor of Detroit: Jerome Cavanagh
- Mayor of Grand Rapids: C. H. Sonneveldt
- Mayor of Flint: Harry K. Cull
- Mayor of Warren, Michigan: Ted Bates
- Mayor of Saginaw: G. Stewart Francke/James W. Stenglein
- Mayor of Dearborn: Orville L. Hubbard
- Mayor of Lansing: Willard I. Bowerman, Jr. (Republican)/Max E. Murninghan
- Mayor of Ann Arbor: Cecil Creal (Republican) / Wendell Hulcher (Republican)

=== Federal office holders ===
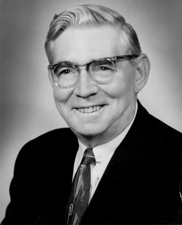
Sen. McNamara

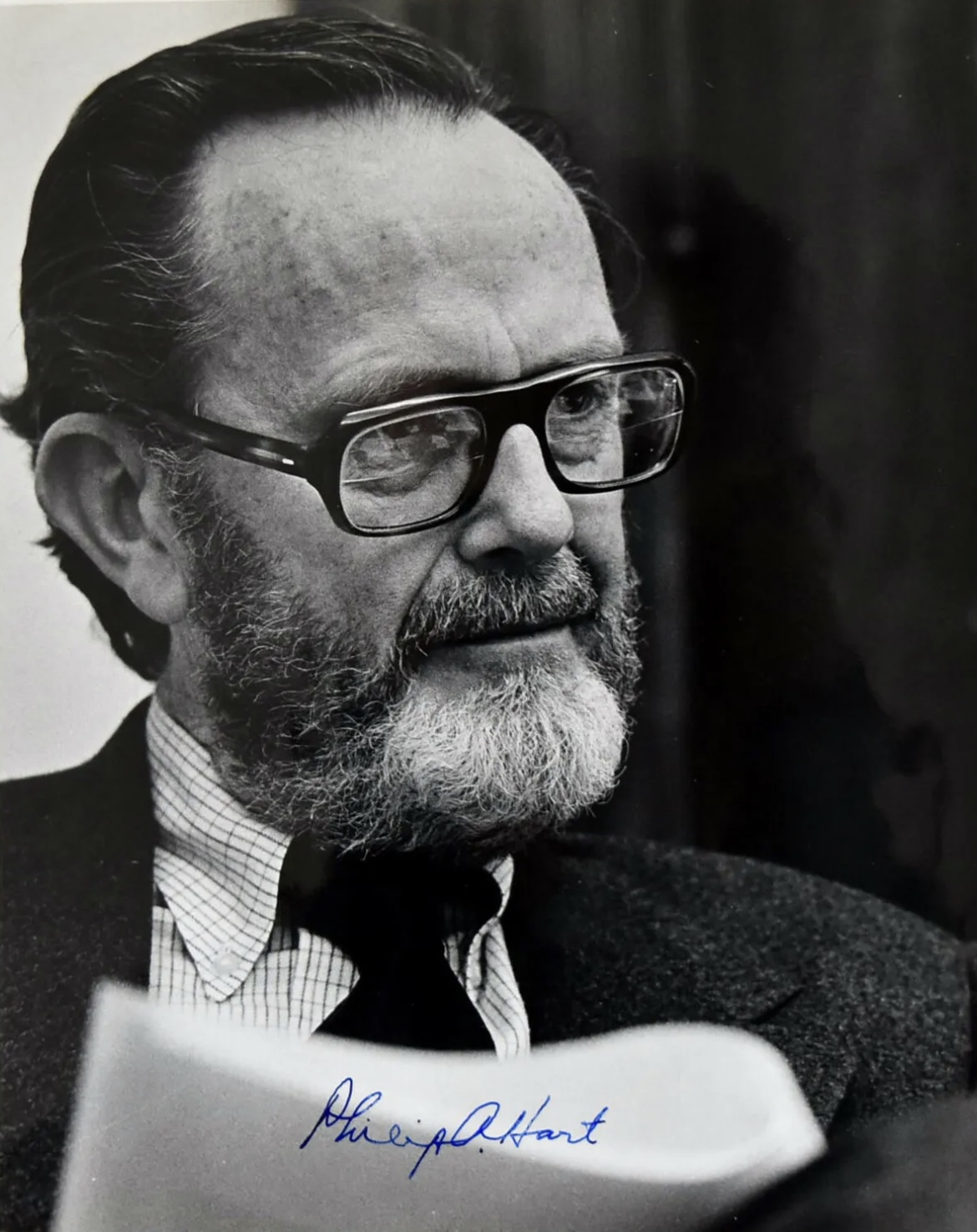
Sen. Hart

- U.S. Senator from Michigan: Patrick V. McNamara (Democrat)
- U.S. Senator from Michigan: Philip Hart (Democrat)
- House District 1: John Conyers (Democrat)
- House District 2: Weston E. Vivian (Democrat)
- House District 3: Paul H. Todd Jr. (Democrat)
- House District 4: J. Edward Hutchinson (Republican)
- House District 5: Gerald Ford (Republican)
- House District 6: Charles E. Chamberlain (Republican)
- House District 7: John C. Mackie (Democrat)
- House District 8: R. James Harvey (Republican)
- House District 9: Robert P. Griffin (Republican)
- House District 10: Elford Albin Cederberg (Republican)
- House District 11: Raymond F. Clevenger (Democrat)
- House District 12: James G. O'Hara (Democrat)
- House District 13: Charles Diggs (Democrat)
- House District 14: Lucien N. Nedzi (Democrat)
- House District 15: William D. Ford (Democrat)
- House District 16: John Dingell Jr. (Democrat)
- House District 17: Martha Griffiths (Democrat)
- House District 18: William Broomfield (Republican)
- House District 19: Billie S. Farnum (Democrat)

== Population ==
In the 1960 United States census, Michigan was recorded as having a population of 7,823,194 persons, ranking as the seventh most populous state in the country. By 1970, the state's population had grown 13.4% to 8,875,083 persons.

=== Cities ===
The following is a list of cities in Michigan with a population of at least 60,000 based on 1960 U.S. Census data. Historic census data from 1950 and 1970 is included to reflect trends in population increases or decreases. Cities that are part of the Detroit metropolitan area are shaded in tan.

1960 Rank	City	County	1950 Pop.	1960 Pop.	1970 Pop.	Change 1960-70
1	Detroit	Wayne	1,849,568	1,670,144	1,514,063	−9.3% ▼
2	Flint	Genesee	163,143	196,940	193,317	−1.8% ▼
3	Grand Rapids	Kent	176,515	177,313	197,649	11.5% ▲
4	Dearborn	Wayne	94,994	112,007	104,199	−7.0% ▼
5	Lansing	Ingham	92,129	107,807	131,403	21.9% ▲
6	Saginaw	Saginaw	92,918	98,265	91,849	−6.5% ▼
7	Warren	Macomb	42,653	89,246	179,260	100.2% ▲
8	Pontiac	Oakland	73,681	82,233	85,279	3.7% ▲
9	Kalamazoo	Kalamazoo	57,704	82,089	85,555	4.1% ▲
10	Royal Oak	Oakland	46,898	80,612	86,238	7.0% ▲
11	St. Clair Shores	Macomb	19,823	76,657	88,093	14.9% ▲
12	Ann Arbor	Washtenaw	48,251	67,340	100,035	48.6% ▲
13	Livonia	Wayne	17,634	66,702	110,109	65.1% ▲
14	Dearborn Heights	Wayne	20,235	61,118	80,069	31.0% ▲
15	Westland	Wayne	30,407	60,743	86,749	42.8% ▲

=== Counties ===
The following is a list of counties in Michigan with populations of at least 100,000 based on 1960 U.S. Census data. Historic census data from 1950 and 1970 are included to reflect trends in population increases or decreases. Counties that are part of the Detroit metropolitan area are shaded in tan.

1960 Rank	County	Largest city	1950 Pop.	1960 Pop.	1970 Pop.	Change 1960-70
1	Wayne	Detroit	2,435,235	2,666,297	2,666,751	0.0% ▲
2	Oakland	Pontiac	396,001	690,259	907,871	31.5% ▲
3	Macomb	Warren	184,961	405,804	625,309	54.1% ▲
4	Genesee	Flint	270,963	374,313	444,341	18.7% ▲
5	Kent	Grand Rapids	288,292	363,187	411,044	13.2% ▲
6	Ingham	Lansing	172,941	211,296	261,039	23.5% ▲
7	Saginaw	Saginaw	153,515	190,752	219,743	15.2% ▲
8	Washtenaw	Ann Arbor	134,606	172,440	234,103	35.8% ▲
9	Kalamazoo	Kalamazoo	126,707	169,712	201,550	18.8% ▲
10	Berrien	Benton Harbor	115,702	149,865	163,875	9.3% ▲
11	Calhoun	Battle Creek	120,813	138,858	141,963	2.2% ▲
12	Jackson	Jackson	108,168	131,994	143,274	8.5% ▲
13	Muskegon	Muskegon	121,545	129,943	157,426	21.2% ▲
14	St. Clair	Port Huron	91,599	107,201	120,175	12.1% ▲
15	Bay	Bay City	88,461	107,042	117,339	9.6% ▲
16	Monroe	Monroe	75,666	101,120	118,479	17.2% ▲

== Sports ==
=== Baseball ===
- 1965 Detroit Tigers season – Under managers Bob Swift and Charlie Dressen, the Tigers compiled an 89–73 record and finished in fourth place in the American League. The team's statistical leaders included Al Kaline with a .281 batting average, Norm Cash with 30 home runs, Willie Horton with 104 RBIs, Denny McLain with 16 wins, and Orlando Peña with a 2.51 earned run average.
- 1965 Michigan Wolverines baseball team - Under head coach Moby Benedict, the Wolverines compiled an 18–14 record and finished second the Big Ten Conference. Ted Sizemore was the team captain.

=== American football ===
- 1965 Detroit Lions season – The Lions, under head coach Harry Gilmer, compiled a 6–7–1 record and finished in sixth place in the NFL's West Division. The team's statistical leaders included Milt Plum with 1,710 passing yards, Amos Marsh with 495 rushing yards, Terry Barr with 433 receiving yards, and Wayne Walker with 57 points scored.
- 1965 Michigan State Spartans football team – Under head coach Duffy Daugherty, the Spartans compiled a 10–0 record in the regular season and were ranked No. 1 before losing to UCLA, 14–12, in the 1965 Rose Bowl. The team was ranked No. 2 in the final AP Poll. The team's statistical leaders included Steve Juday with 1,253 passing yards, Clinton Jones with 900 rushing yards, and Gene Washington with 719 receiving yards.
- 1965 Michigan Wolverines football team – Under head coach Bump Elliott, the Wolverines compiled a 4–6 record. The team's statistical leaders included Wally Gabler with 825 passing yards, Carl Ward with 639 rushing yards, and Jack Clancy with 762 receiving yards.
- 1965 Western Michigan Broncos football team – Under head coach Bill Doolittle, the Broncos compiled a 6–2–1 record.
- 1965 Central Michigan Chippewas football team – Under head coach Kenneth "Bill" Kelly, the Chippewas compiled a 5–5 record.
- 1965 Eastern Michigan Hurons football team – Under head coach Jerry Raymond, the Hurons compiled a 3–4–1 record.
- 1965 Wayne State Tartars football team – Under head coach Vernon K. Gale, the Tartars compiled a 3–4–1 record.

=== Basketball ===
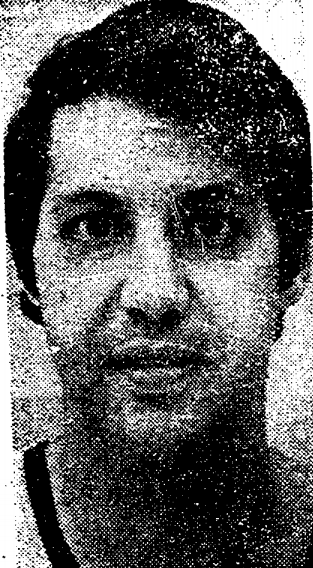
Terry Dischinger

- 1964–65 Detroit Pistons season – Under head coaches Charles Wolf and Dave DeBusschere, the Pistons compiled a 31–49 record. The team's statistical leaders included Terry Dischinger with 1,456 points, Reggie Harding with 906 rebounds, and DeBusschere with 253 assists.
- 1964–65 Michigan Wolverines men's basketball team – Under head coach Dave Strack, the Wolverines compiled a 24–4 record, won the Big Ten Conference championship, and lost to UCLA in the championship game of the 1965 NCAA basketball tournament. Cazzie Russell led the team with 694 points, and Bill Buntin led in rebounds with 323.
- 1964–65 Detroit Titans men's basketball team – The Titans compiled a 20–8 record under head coach Bob Calihan. Lou Hyatt led the team with an average of 17.6 points per game.
- 1964–65 Michigan State Spartans men's basketball team – Under head coach Forddy Anderson, the Spartans compiled a 5–18 record. Stan Washington led the team with an average of 21.3 points per game.
- 1964–65 Western Michigan Broncos men's basketball team – Under head coach Don Boven, the Broncos compiled an 8–16 record.

=== Ice hockey ===
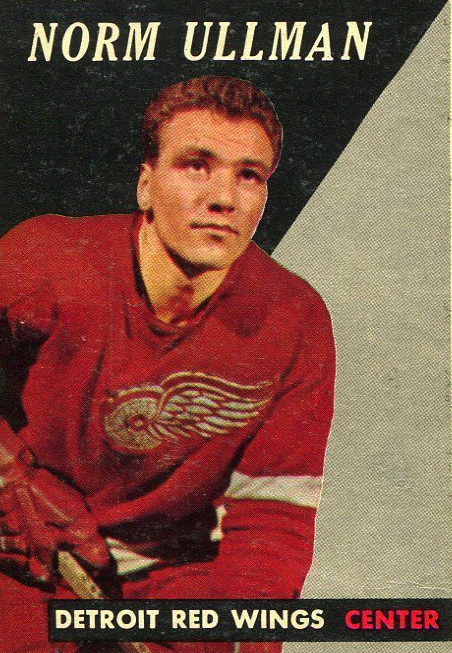
Norm Ullman

- 1964–65 Detroit Red Wings season – Under head coach Sid Abel, the Red Wings compiled a 40–23–7 record and lost to the Chicago Black Hawks in the semi-finals of the playoffs. The team's statistical leaders included Norm Ullman with 42 goals and 83 points and Gordie Howe with 47 assists. The team's regular goaltender was Roger Crozier.
- 1964–65 Michigan Tech Huskies men's ice hockey team – Under head coach John MacInnes, Michigan Tech compiled a 24–5–2 record and won the 1965 NCAA Division I Men's Ice Hockey Tournament, defeating Boston College in the championship.
- 1964–65 Michigan Wolverines men's ice hockey season – Under head coach Al Renfrew, the Wolverines compiled a 13–12–1 record.
- 1964–65 Michigan State Spartans men's ice hockey team – Under head coach Amo Bessone, the Spartans compiled a 17–12 record.

=== Golf ===
- Buick Open – Tony Lema won his second consecutive Buick Open in a close finish on June 6 at Warwick Hills Golf and Country Club in Grand Blanc, Michigan.
- Michigan Open – Gene Bone, a Pontiac native, won the tournament on August 1, finishing 11 strokes ahead of the second lowest participant.

=== Boat racing ===
- Port Huron to Mackinac Boat Race – The Gypsy won the annual race, becoming the first boat to win the race three times. The Gypsy was skippered by Milwaukee auto dealer Charles Kotovic in a corrected time of 42 hours, 44 minutes, and 13 seconds.
- Spirit of Detroit race - Chuck Thompson in the Tahoe Miss won the powerboat race on the Detroit River on August 29.

=== Other ===
- 1965 NCAA Indoor Track and Field Championships – The first annual NCAA indoor championships were held at Cobo Arena in Detroit in March; Missouri won the team championship.

== Music ==
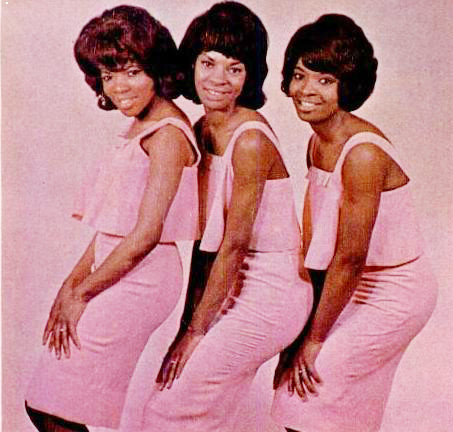
Martha and the Vandellas in 1965

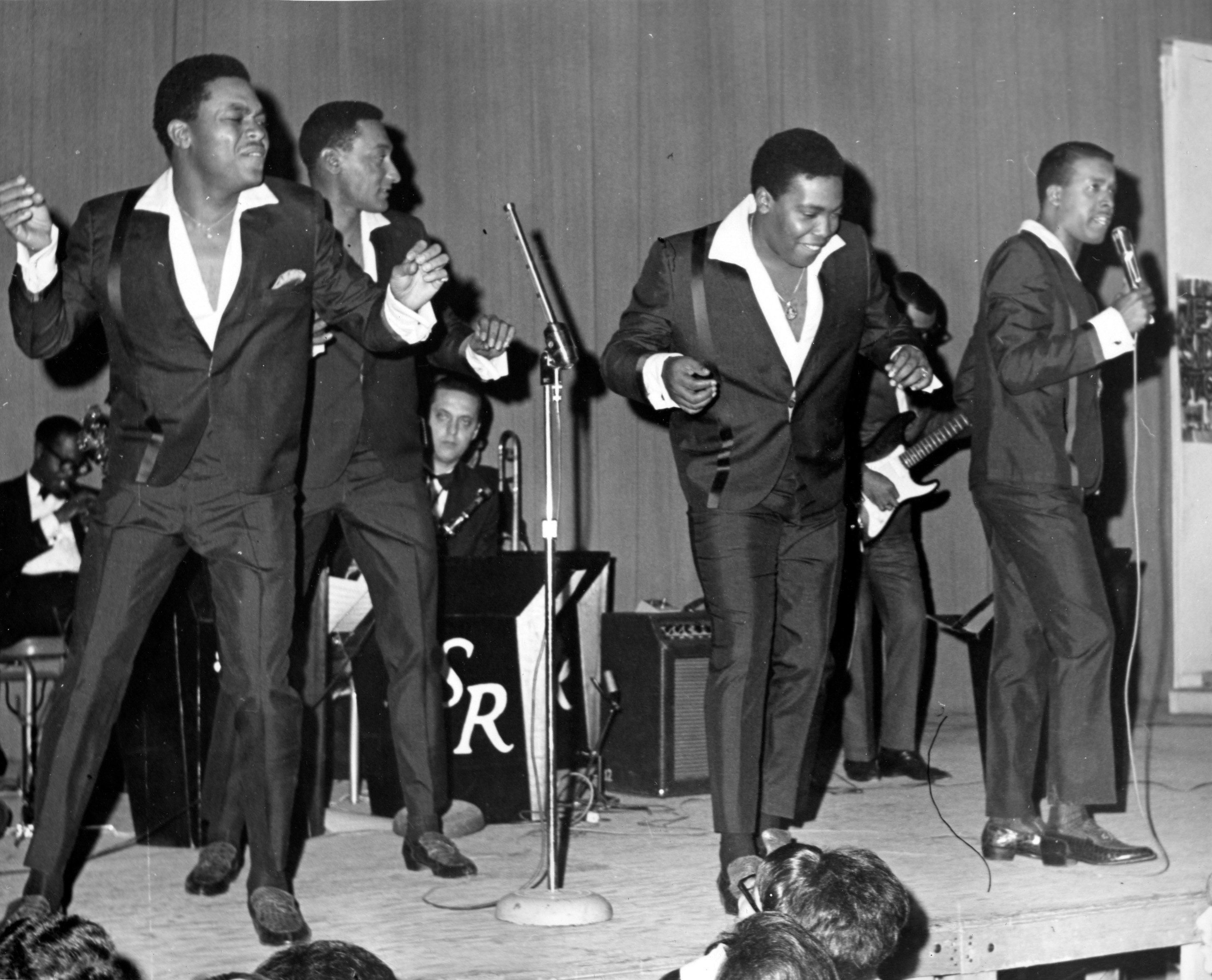
The Four Tops

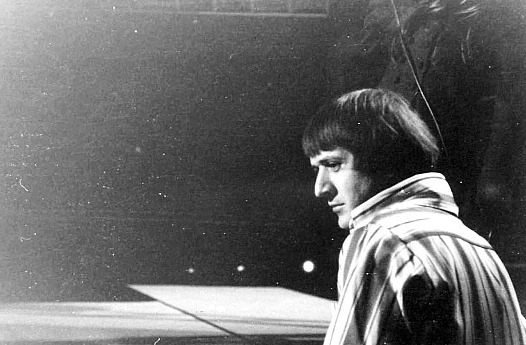
Sonny Bono

The Motown sound was at its peak in 1965 with at least five of the label's songs from that year later being included on Rolling Stone's list of "The 500 Greatest Songs of All Time".

- "My Girl" by The Temptations was released on December 21, 1964, rose to No. 1 on the Billboard Hot 100 on March 6, 1965, and was later ranked No. 88 on Rolling Stone's list of "The 500 Greatest Songs of All Time". It was ranked No. 10 on the Billboard Year-End Hot 100 singles of 1965.
- "How Sweet It Is (To Be Loved by You)" by Marvin Gaye peaked at No. 6 on the Billboard Hot 100 on January 30. It was ranked No. 100 on the Billboard Year-End Hot 100 singles of 1965.
- "Stop! In the Name of Love" by The Supremes was released on February 8 and rose to No. 1 on the Billboard Hot 100 on March 27. It was ranked No. 20 on the Billboard Year-End Hot 100 singles of 1965.
- "Nowhere to Run" by Martha and the Vandellas was released on February 10, peaked at No. 8 on the Billboard Hot 100 on April 10, and was later included in Rolling Stone's list of "The 500 Greatest Songs of All Time". It was ranked No. 68 on the Billboard Year-End Hot 100 singles of 1965.
- "Shotgun" by Junior Walker & the All Stars was released on February 13, 1965, and rose to No. 1 on the R&B chart and No. 4 on the Billboard Hot 100 in April. It was ranked No. 15 on the Billboard Year-End Hot 100 singles of 1965.
- "I'll Be Doggone" by Marvin Gaye was released on February 26 and rose to No. 8 on the Billboard Hot 100. It was ranked No. 58 on the Billboard Year-End Hot 100 singles of 1965.
- "Ooo Baby Baby" by The Miracles was released on March 5 and was later included in Rolling Stone's list of "The 500 Greatest Songs of All Time". It was ranked No. 93 on the Billboard Year-End Hot 100 singles of 1965.
- "Back in My Arms Again" by The Supremes was released on April 15 and rose to No. 1 on the Billboard Hot 100 on June 12. It was ranked No. 37 on the Billboard Year-End Hot 100 singles of 1965.
- "I Can't Help Myself (Sugar Pie Honey Bunch)" by the Four Tops was released on April 23, rose to No. 1 on the Billboard Hot 100 on June 19, and was later included in Rolling Stone's list of "The 500 Greatest Songs of All Time". It was ranked No. 2 on the Billboard Year-End Hot 100 singles of 1965.
- "The Tracks of My Tears" by The Miracles was released on June 23 and was later ranked at No. 50 on Rolling Stone's list of "The 500 Greatest Songs of All Time. It was ranked No. 78 on the Billboard Year-End Hot 100 singles of 1965.
- "It's the Same Old Song" by the Four Tops was released on July 9 and rose to No. 5 on the Billboard Hot 100 (on August 28) and No. 2 on the R&B chart. It was ranked No. 83 on the Billboard Year-End Hot 100 singles of 1965.
- "Take Me in Your Arms (Rock Me a Little While)" by Kim Weston was released in September and reached No. 4 on the R&B chart.
- "I Hear a Symphony" by The Supremes was released on October 6 and reached No. 1 on the Billboard Hot 100 on November 20.
- "Uptight (Everything's Alright)" by Stevie Wonder was released on November 22 and reached No. 3 on the Billboard Hot 100 and No. 1 on the R&B chart.
- "Don't Mess with Bill" by The Marvelettes was released on November 26 and rose to No. 7 on the Billboard Hot 100 and No. 3 on the R&B chart.

In addition, Detroit native Sonny Bono had hit records with his wife as Sonny & Cher with "I Got You Babe" (No. 1) and "Baby Don't Go" (No. 8).

== Chronology of events ==
=== January ===
- January 1 - The 1964 Michigan Wolverines football team defeated Oregon State in the 1965 Rose Bowl.

=== February ===
- February 19 - Henry Ford II married Cristina Ford.
- February 25- The worst blizzard since 1929 brings the Detroit area to a standstill.

=== March ===
- March 9 - Detroit Tigers manager Charlie Dressen suffered a heart attack, sidelining him for the first part of the 1965 season.
- March 20 - The Michigan basketball team lost to UCLA, 91–80, in the NCAA championship game in Portland, Oregon
- March 25 - Civil rights activist Viola Liuzzo from Detroit was shot by members of the Ku Klux Klan in Alabama.

=== April ===
- April 1 - Forddy Anderson was fired as head coach of the Michigan State Spartans men's basketball team, a position he held since 1954.
- April 11 - The 1965 Palm Sunday tornado outbreak struck Indiana, Ohio, Michigan, Wisconsin, Illinois and Iowa, with 47 tornadoes, killing 271 people and injuring 1,500.

=== May ===
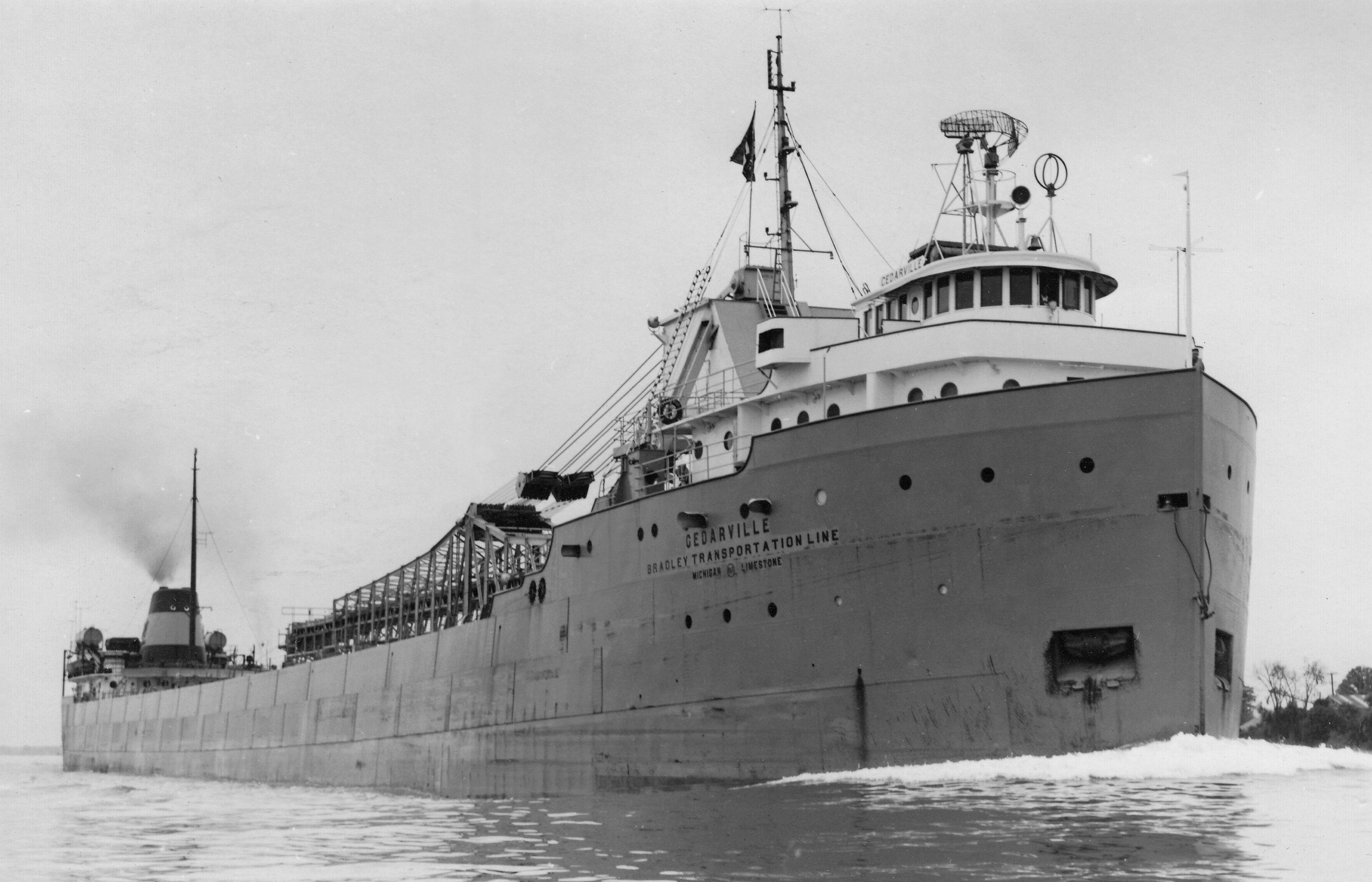
SS Cedarville

- May 7 - The SS Cedarville, filled with 14,411 tons of limestone, collided with the SS Topdalsfjord near the Mackinac Bridge and sank. Ten crew members on the Cedarville died in the incident.

=== June ===
- June 23 - "The Tracks of My Tears" by The Miracles was released. It was later ranked at No. 50 on Rolling Stone's list of "The 500 Greatest Songs of All Time".
- June 28 - Governor Romney signs a bill making Petoskey stone Michigan's state stone.

=== November ===
- November 2 - Jerome Cavanagh was re-elected as Mayor of Detroit, and Nicholas Hood was elected as the second African-American to serve on Detroit's city council.
- November 7 - Three patients died at Pontiac Osteopathic Hospital after anesthetist accidentally injected them with ether.

== Births ==
- January 10 - Butch Hartman, animator, writer, director, producer, and actor, best known for creating the Nickelodeon cartoons The Fairly OddParents, Danny Phantom, T.U.F.F. Puppy and Bunsen Is a Beast, in Highland Park, Michigan
- February 25 - Veronica Webb, supermodel, actress, writer, and television personality, in Detroit
- March 23 - Wayne Presley, NHL right wing (1984–1996), in Dearborn, Michigan
- April 14 - Pat Shurmur, head coach of the Cleveland Browns (2011–2012), in Ann Arbor, Michigan
- July 12 - Robin Wilson, lead vocalist of Gin Blossoms, in Detroit
- July 21 - Mike Bordick, Major League Baseball pitcher (1990–2003), in Marquette, Michigan
- August 17 - Steve Gorman, drummer for The Black Crowes and sports talk radio host, in Muskegon, Michigan
- August 22 - Thaddeus McCotter, U.S. Representative from Michigan's 11th congressional district from 2003 to 2012, in Livonia, Michigan
- September 9 - Dan Majerle, NBA basketball player (1988-2002) and coach (2008-present), in Traverse City, Michigan
- November 2 - Chuck Klingbeil, defensive tackle in CFL (1989–1990) and NFL (1991–1995) and MVP of the 77th Grey Cup, in Houghton, Michigan
- November 4 - Wayne Static, lead vocalist, guitarist, keyboardist and music sequencer for metal band Static-X, in Muskegon, Michigan
- December 14 - Ted Raimi, actor (Joxer in Xena: Warrior Princess/Hercules: The Legendary Journeys), director, comedian, and writer, in Detroit
- December 17 - Jeff Grayer, professional basketball player (1988–1999), in Flint, Michigan
- December 18 - Shawn Christian, film and television actor (Summerland), in Grand Rapids, Michigan
- December 22 - David S. Goyer, screenwriter (the Blade trilogy, The Dark Knight trilogy, Dark City, Man of Steel, Batman v Superman) and film director (Blade: Trinity, The Invisible), in Ann Arbor, Michigan
- Date unknown - Kenneth Cockrel Jr., Mayor of Detroit (2008-2009), in Detroit

=== Gallery of 1965 births ===
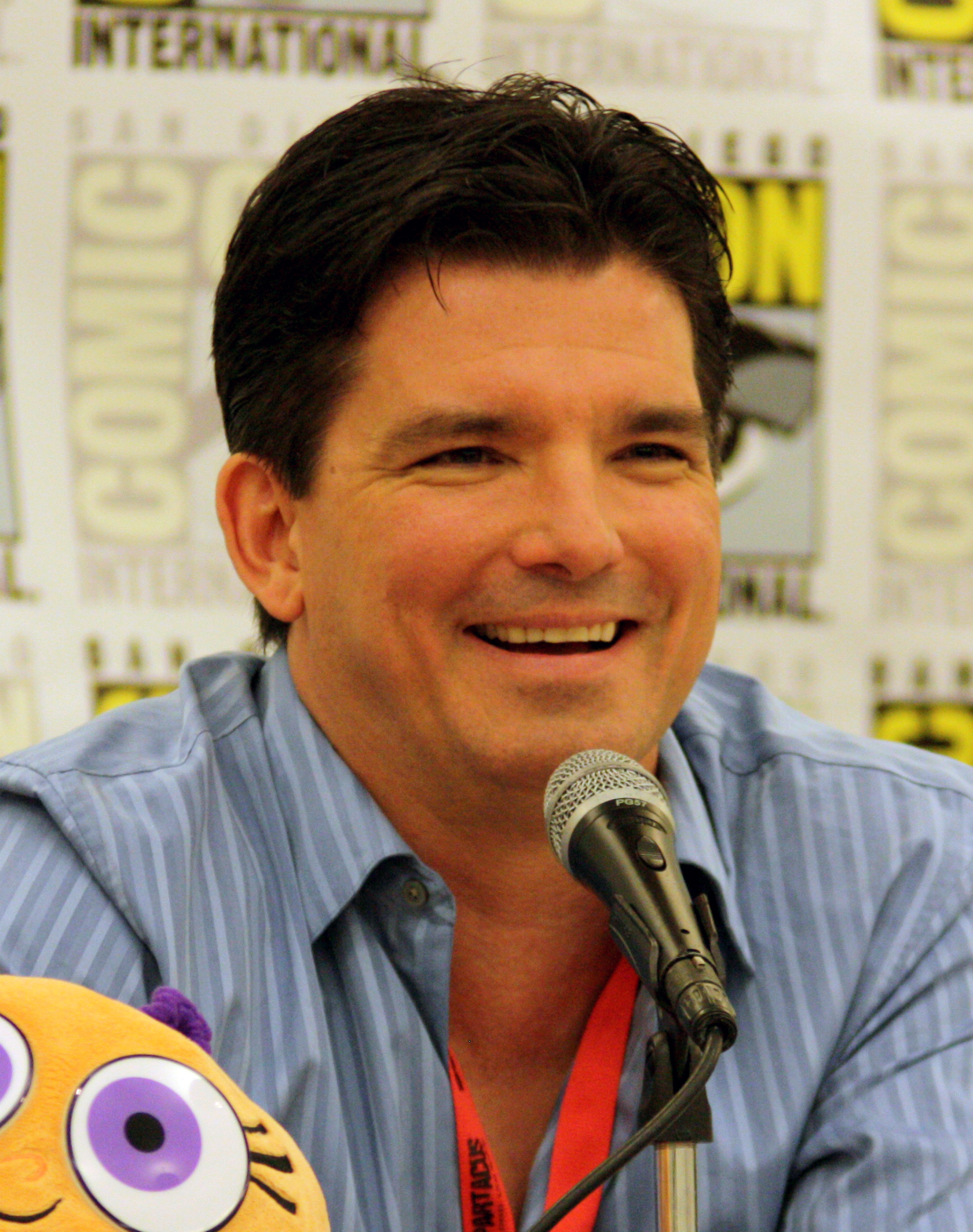
Butch Hartman

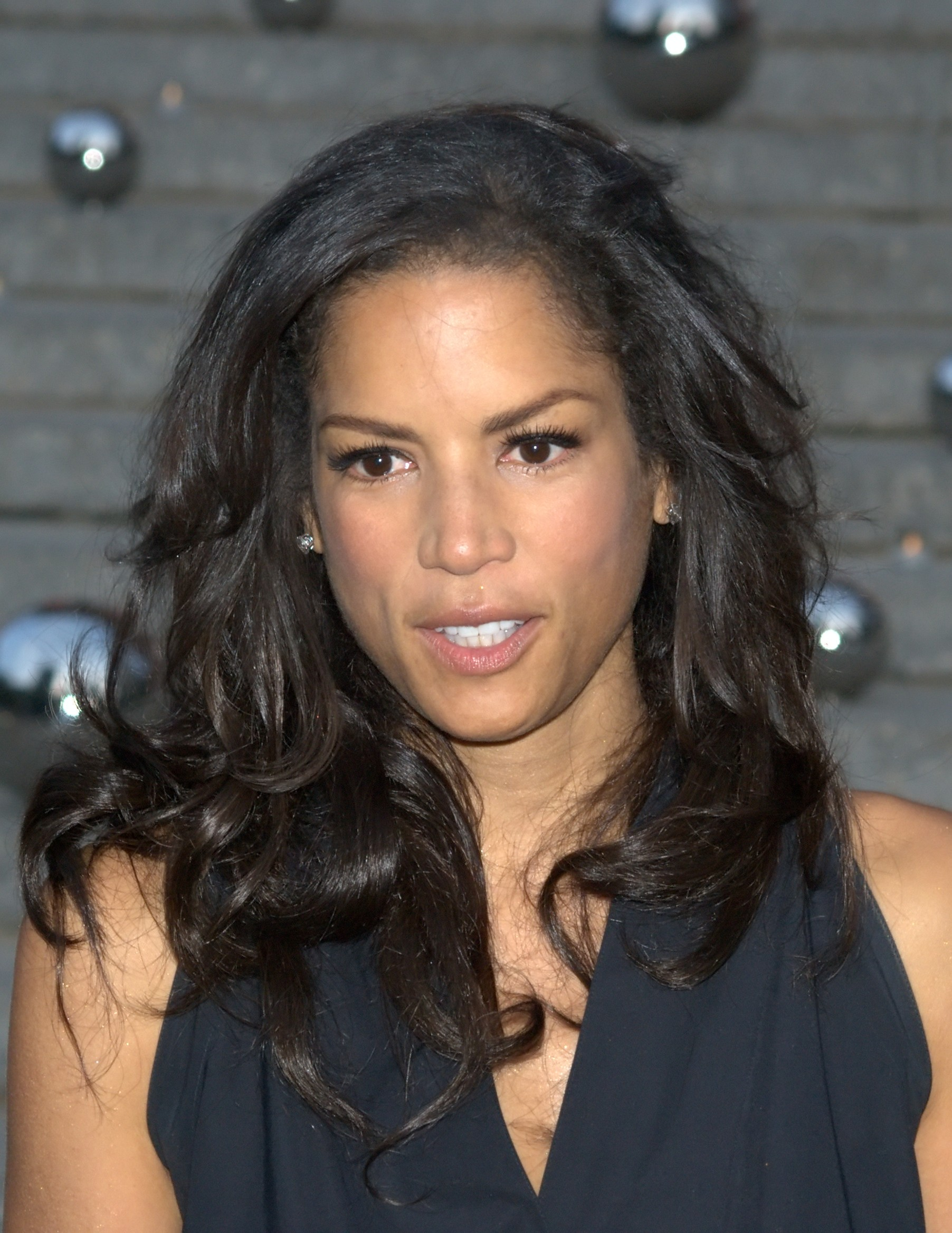
Veronica Webb

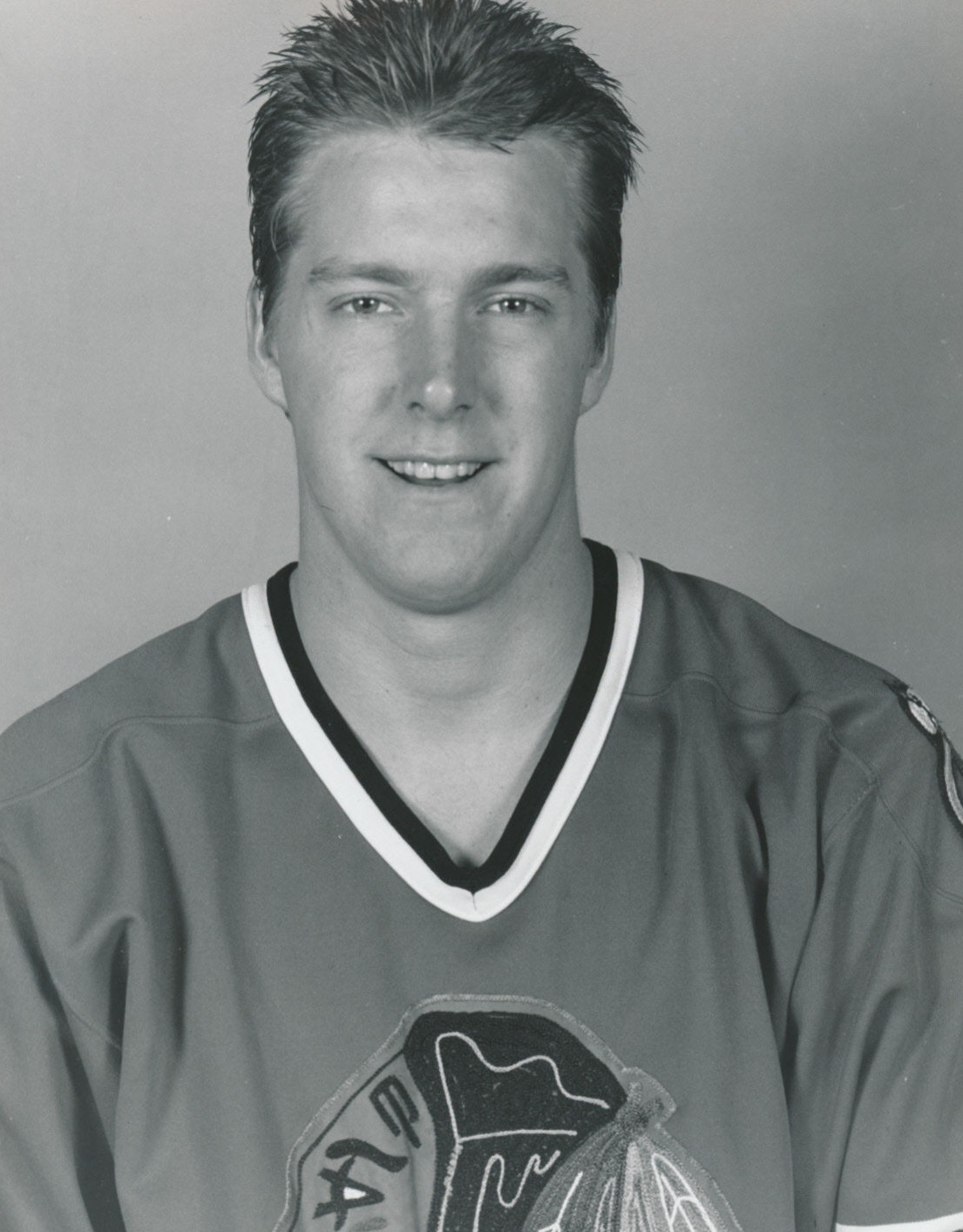
Wayne Presley

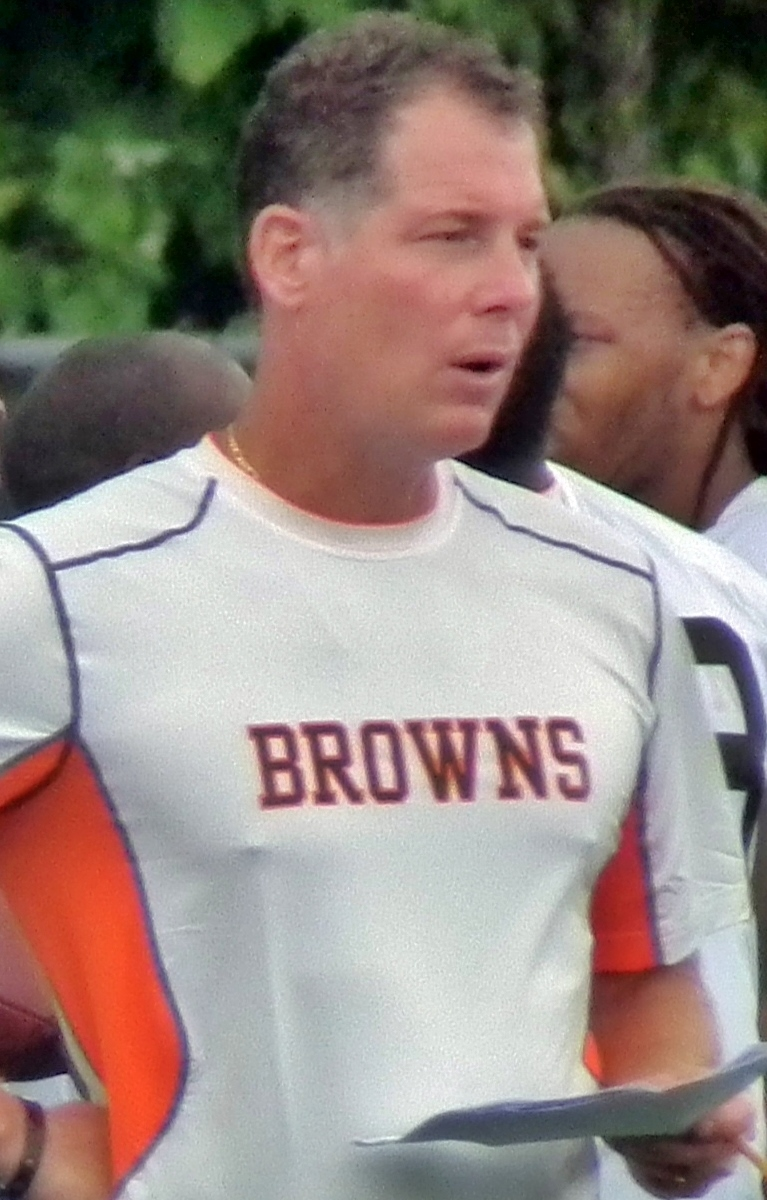
Pat Shurmur

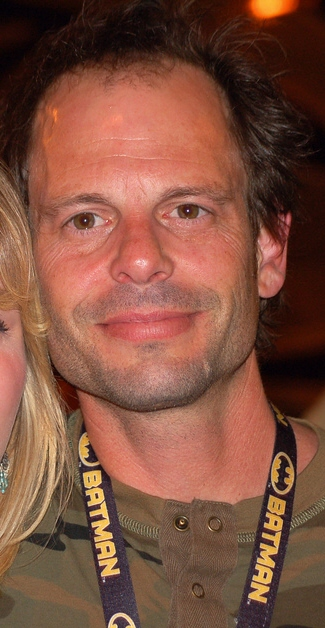
Robin Wilson

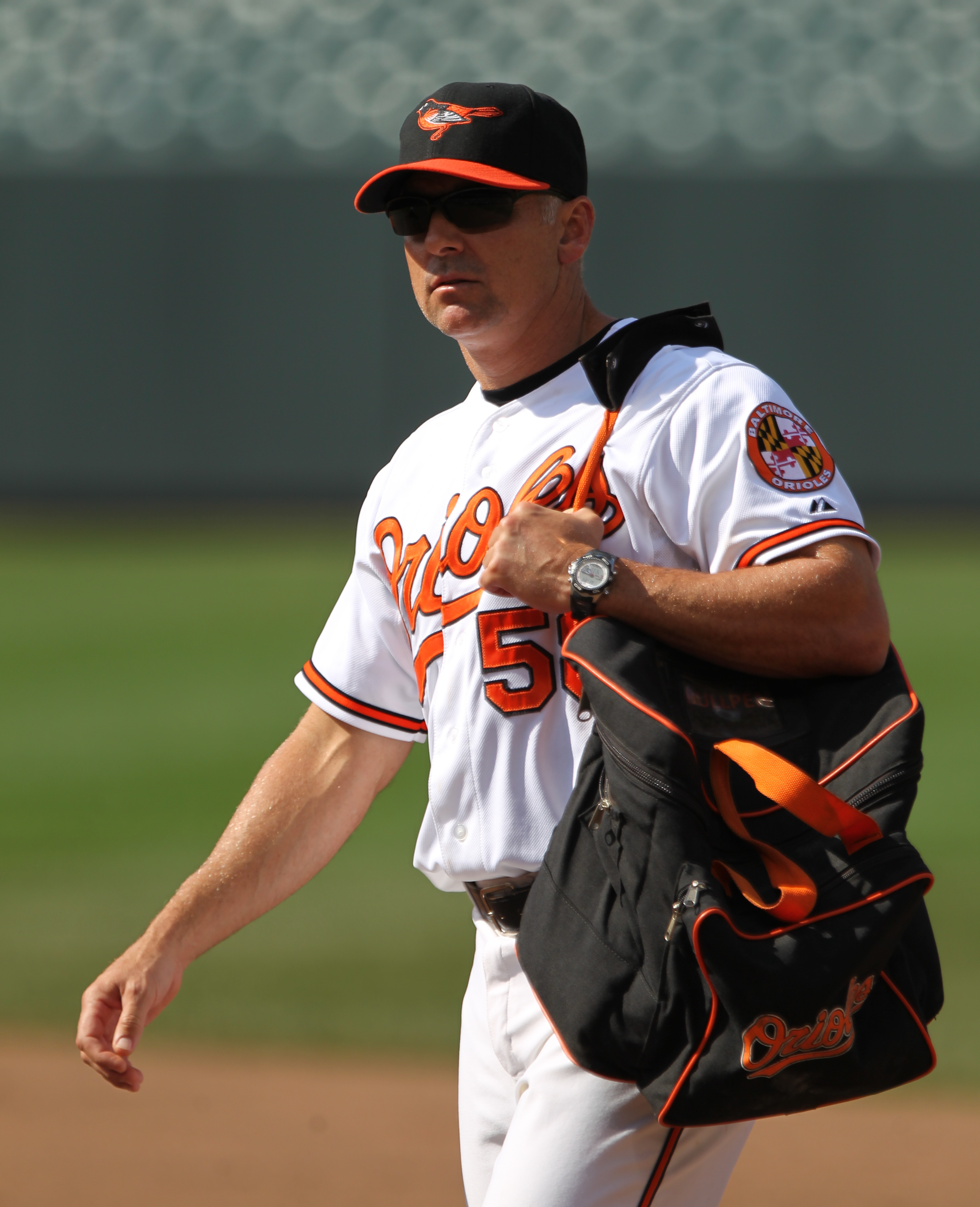
Mike Bordick

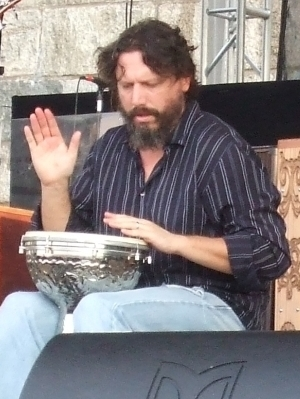
Steve Gorman

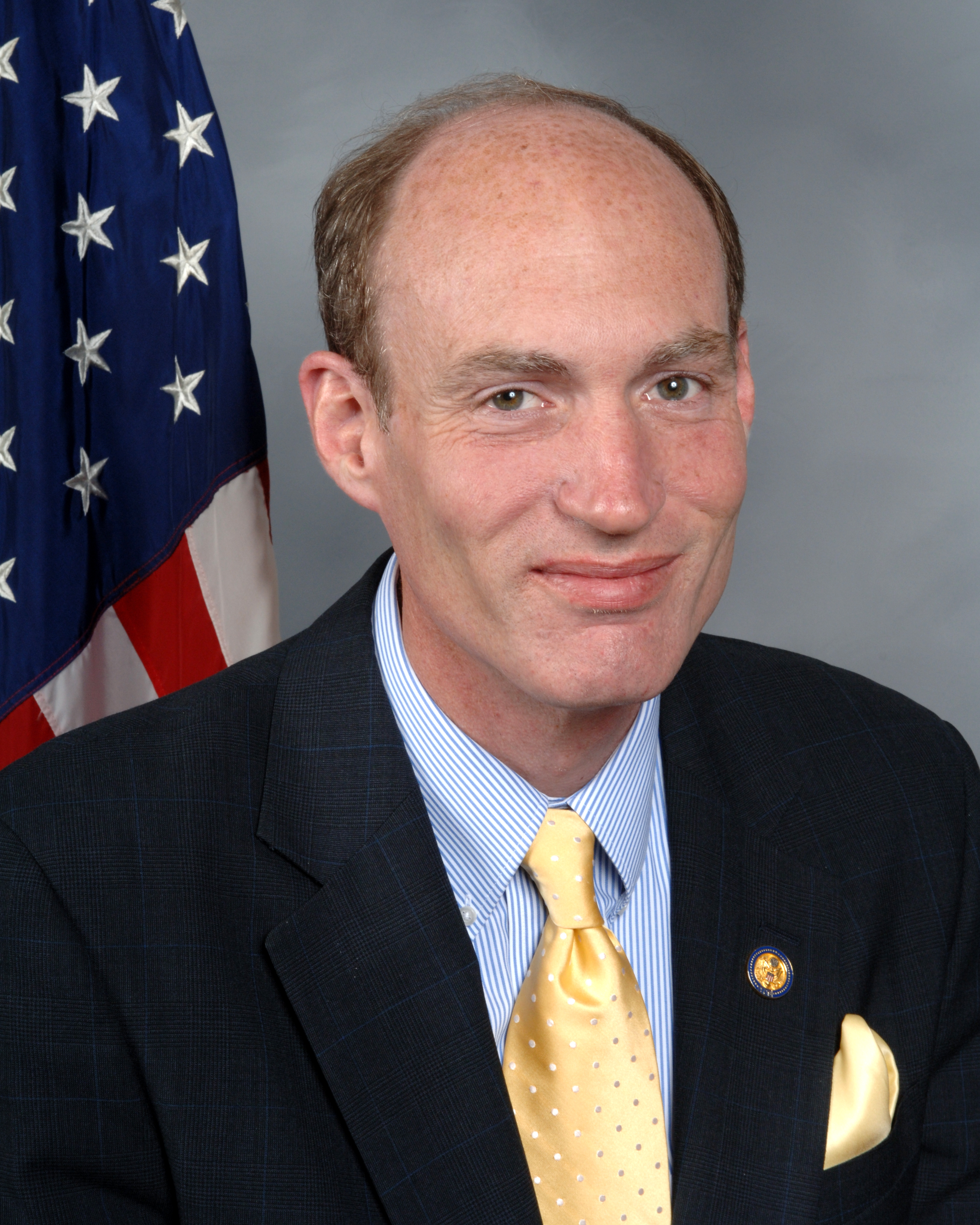
Thaddeus McCotter

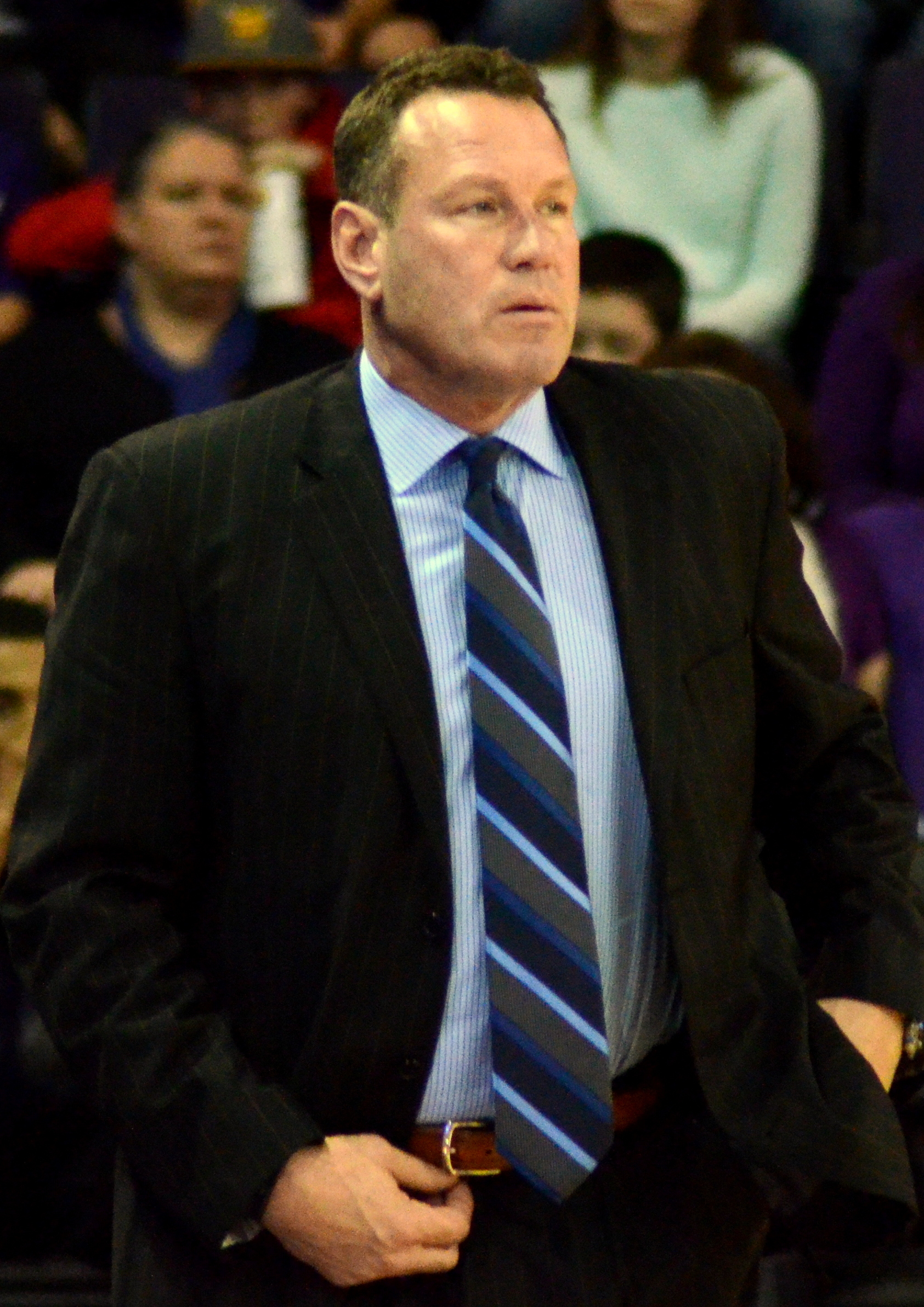
Dan Majerle

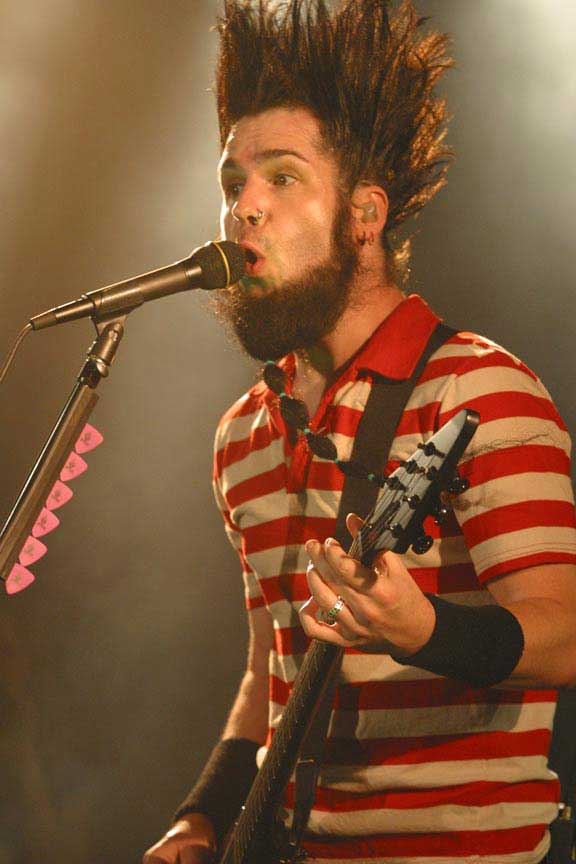
Wayne Static

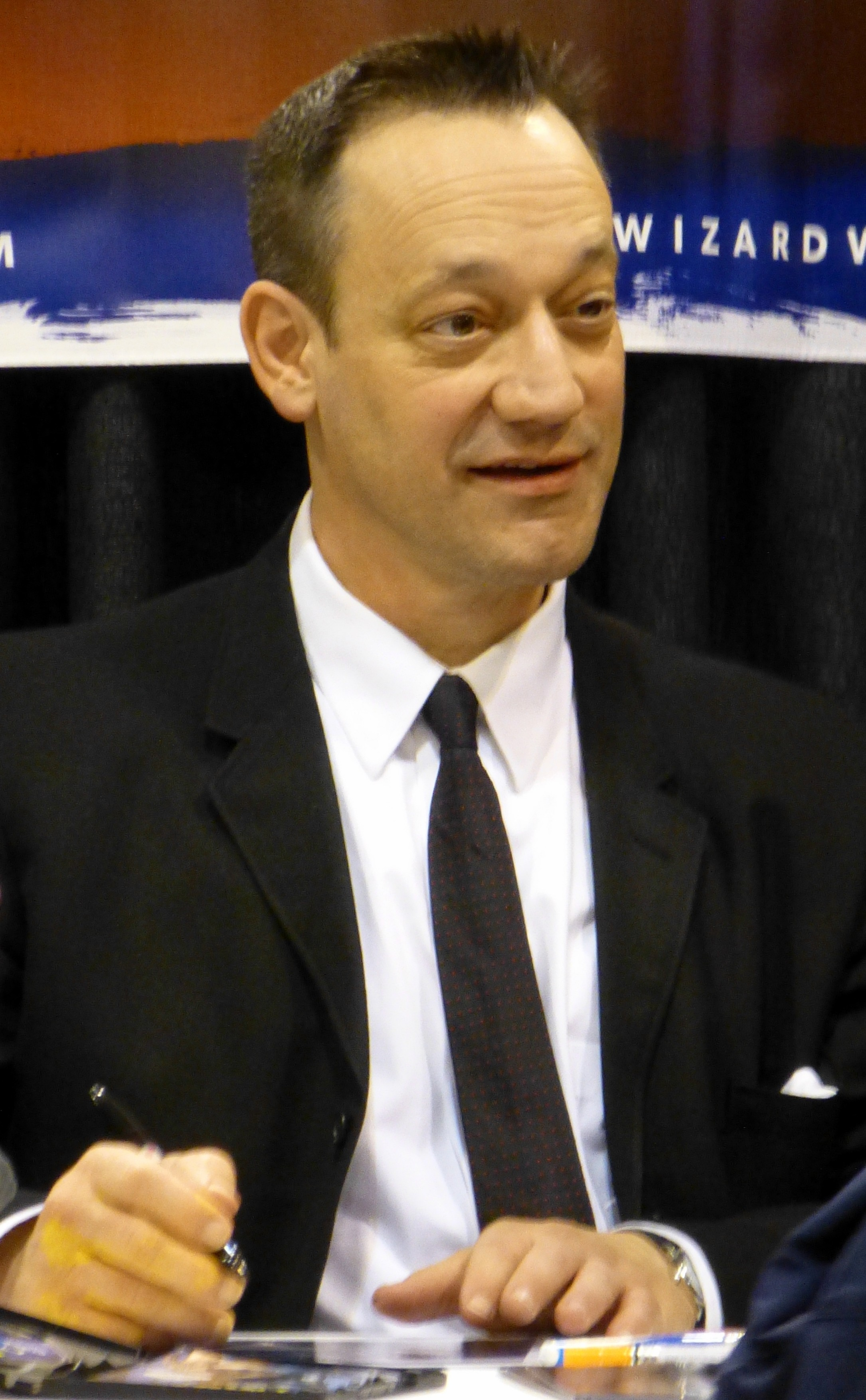
Ted Raimi

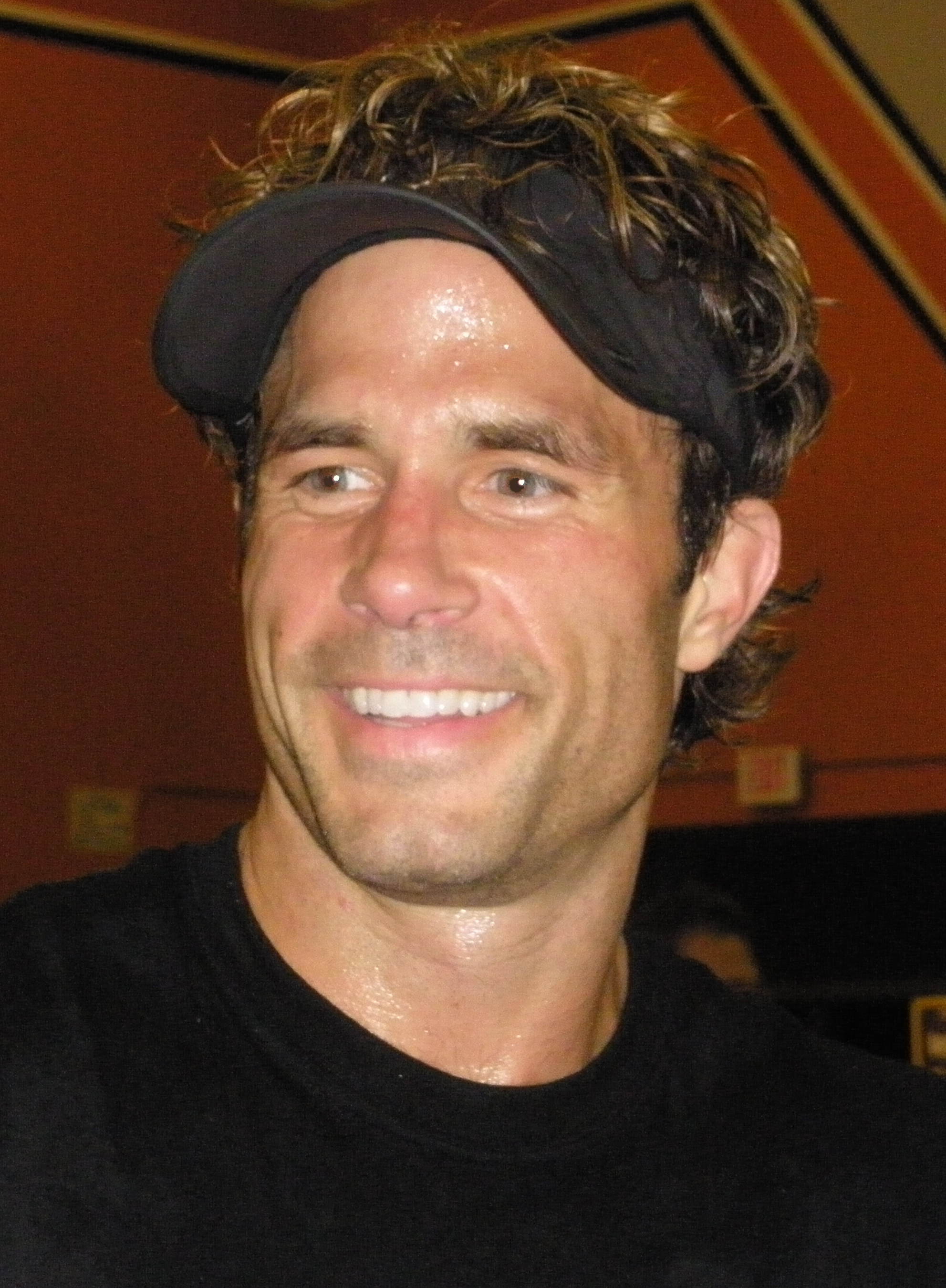
Shawn Christian

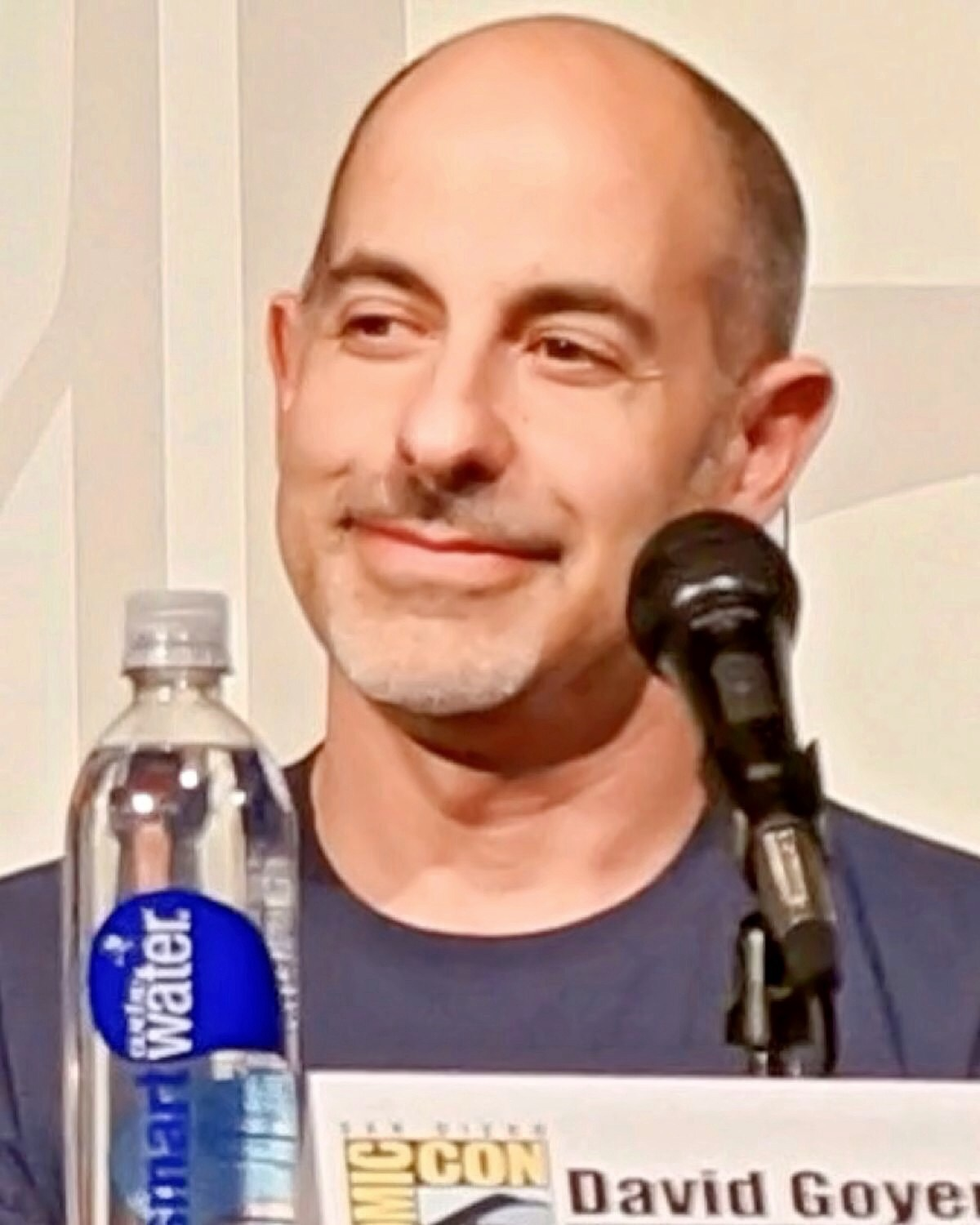
David S. Goyer

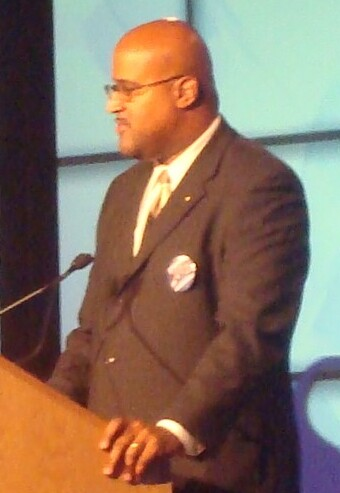
Kenneth Cockrel Jr.

== Deaths ==
- January 11 - Wally Pipp, Major League Baseball first baseman (1913–1928) and 2× AL home run leader, at age 71 in Grand Rapids, Michigan
- February 23 - John Kitzmiller, film actor and Battle Creek native, at age 51 in Rome
- March 25 - Viola Liuzzo, a civil rights activist from Detroit, killed by the Ku Klux Klan in Alabama at age 39
- April 3 - Lloyd Brazil, athlete, coach and athletic director at the University of Detroit for 38 years, at age 57 in Detroit
- April 4 - Fred Norcross, quarterback for Michigan teams that were 33–1–1 and claimed national championships in 1903 and 1904, at age 80 in Ann Arbor, Michigan
- November 23 - Harlan Page, football, basketball, and baseball player and coach, one of basketball's first star players in the early 1900s, at age 78 in Watervliet, Michigan
- December 9 - Branch Rickey, Michigan baseball coach (1910-1913) who later integrated Major League Baseball, at age 83 in Columbia, Missouri

=== Gallery of 1965 deaths ===
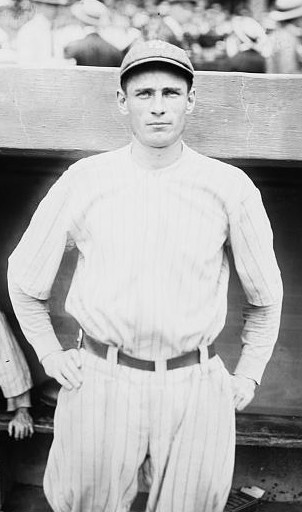
Wally Pipp

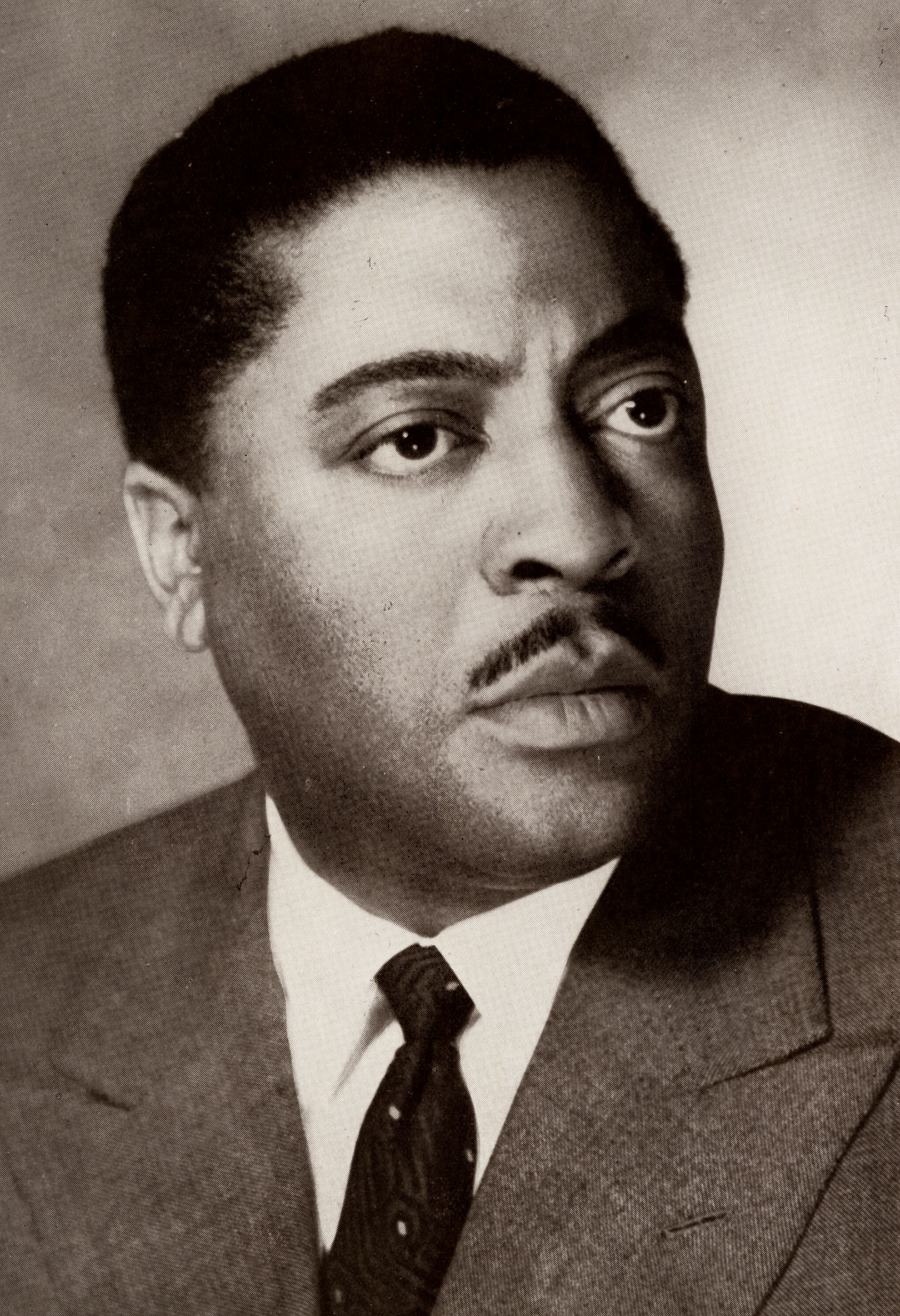
John Kitzmiller

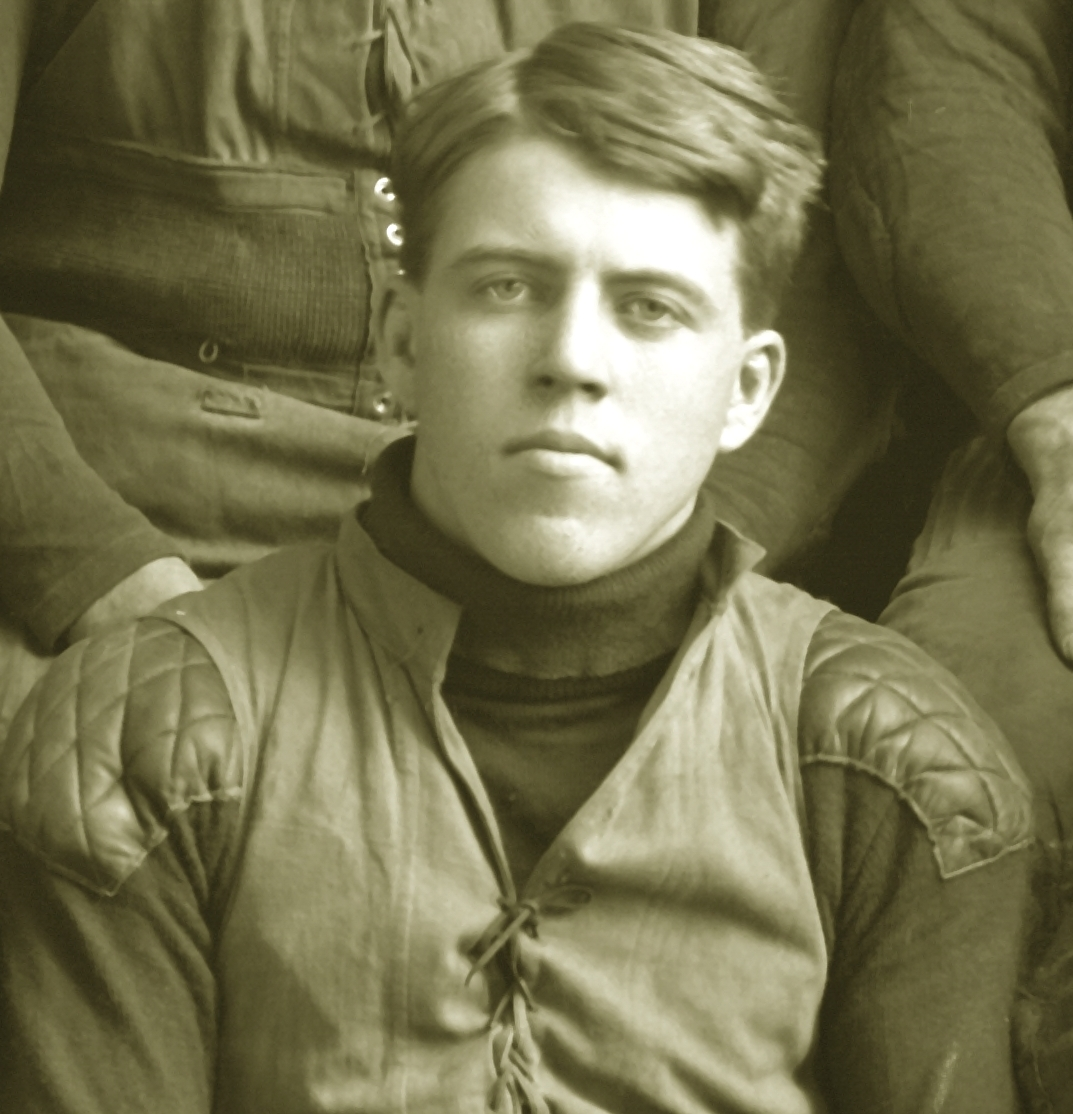
Fred Norcross

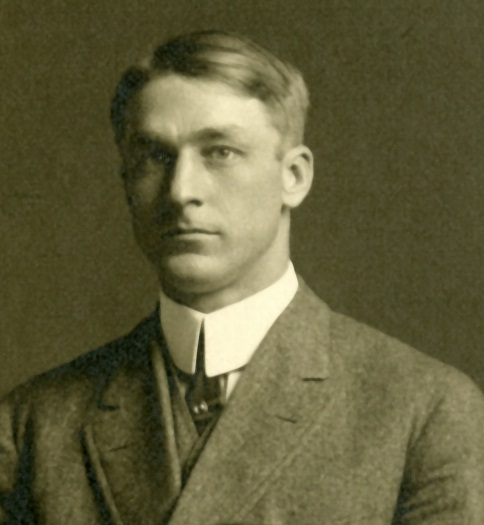
Branch Rickey

== See also ==
- History of Michigan
- History of Detroit
