= List of Cash Box Top 100 number-one singles of 1965 =

Number-one singles of chart in American magazine

These are the number-one singles of 1965 according to the Top 100 Singles chart in Cashbox magazine.

Issue date	Song	Artist
January 2	I Feel Fine	The Beatles
January 9	I Feel Fine	The Beatles
January 16	I Feel Fine	The Beatles
January 23	Downtown	Petula Clark
January 30	Downtown	Petula Clark
February 6	You've Lost That Lovin' Feelin'	The Righteous Brothers
February 13	You've Lost That Lovin' Feelin'	The Righteous Brothers
February 20	You've Lost That Lovin' Feelin'	The Righteous Brothers
February 27	This Diamond Ring	Gary Lewis & the Playboys
March 6	Eight Days a Week	The Beatles
March 13	Eight Days a Week	The Beatles
March 20	Eight Days a Week	The Beatles
March 27	Stop! In the Name of Love	The Supremes
April 3	Can't You Hear My Heartbeat	Herman's Hermits
April 10	I'm Telling You Now	Freddie & The Dreamers
April 17	I'm Telling You Now	Freddie & The Dreamers
April 24	Game of Love	Wayne Fontana & The Mindbenders
May 1	Mrs. Brown You've Got a Lovely Daughter	Herman's Hermits
May 8	Mrs. Brown You've Got a Lovely Daughter	Herman's Hermits
May 15	Mrs. Brown You've Got a Lovely Daughter	Herman's Hermits
May 22	Mrs. Brown You've Got a Lovely Daughter	Herman's Hermits
May 29	Ticket to Ride	The Beatles
June 5	Back in My Arms Again	The Supremes
June 12	Help Me, Rhonda	The Beach Boys
June 19	I Can't Help Myself (Sugar Pie, Honey Bunch)	The Four Tops
June 26	I Can't Help Myself (Sugar Pie, Honey Bunch)	The Four Tops
July 3	Mr. Tambourine Man	The Byrds
July 10	(I Can't Get No) Satisfaction	The Rolling Stones
July 17	(I Can't Get No) Satisfaction	The Rolling Stones
July 24	(I Can't Get No) Satisfaction	The Rolling Stones
July 31	(I Can't Get No) Satisfaction	The Rolling Stones
August 7	I'm Henry VIII, I Am	Herman's Hermits
August 14	I Got You Babe	Sonny & Cher
August 21	I Got You Babe	Sonny & Cher
August 28	Help!	The Beatles
September 4	Help!	The Beatles
September 11	Help!	The Beatles
September 18	Like a Rolling Stone	Bob Dylan
September 25	Eve of Destruction	Barry McGuire
October 2	Hang on Sloopy	The McCoys
October 9	Yesterday	The Beatles
October 16	Yesterday	The Beatles
October 23	A Lover's Concerto	The Toys
October 30	Yesterday	The Beatles
November 6	Get Off of My Cloud	The Rolling Stones
November 13	Get Off of My Cloud	The Rolling Stones
November 20	I Hear a Symphony	The Supremes
November 27	1-2-3	Len Barry
December 4	Turn! Turn! Turn! (To Everything There Is a Season)	The Byrds
December 11	Let's Hang On!	The 4 Seasons
December 18	Taste of Honey	Herb Alpert & The Tijuana Brass
December 25	Over and Over	The Dave Clark Five

== See also ==
- 1965 in music
- List of Hot 100 number-one singles of 1965 (U.S.)
