= List of Billboard Hot 100 number ones of 1965 =

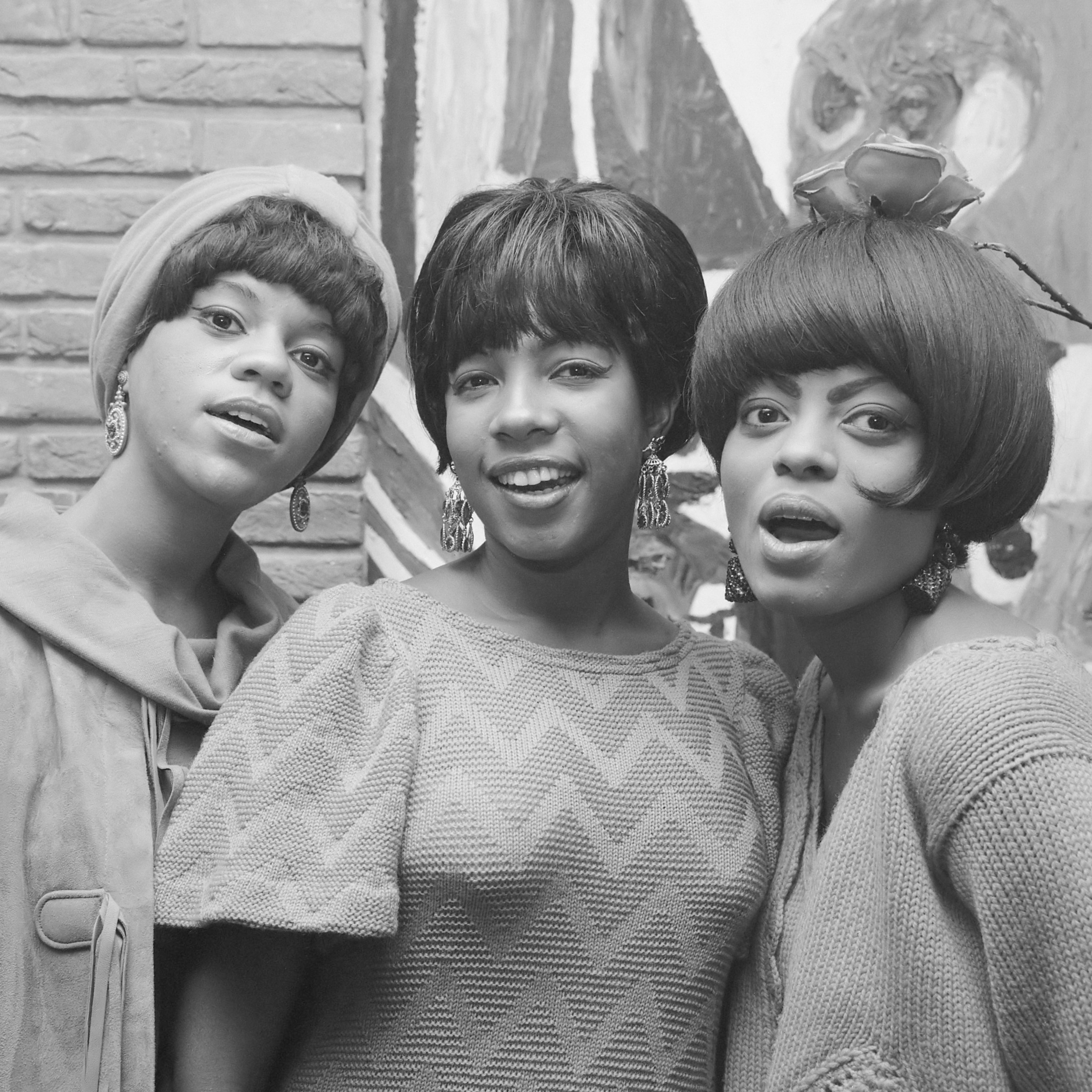
The Supremes scored four number ones in 1965 with "Come See About Me", "Stop! In the Name of Love", "Back in My Arms Again" and "I Hear a Symphony".

The Billboard Hot 100 is a chart published since August 1958 by Billboard magazine which ranks the best-performing singles in the United States. In 1965, it was compiled based on a combination of sales and airplay data sourced from surveys of retail outlets and playlists submitted by radio stations respectively, and 26 different singles spent time at number one.

In the issue of Billboard dated January 2, the Beatles were at number one with "I Feel Fine", retaining the position from the previous week. Having released their first single in 1962, the British band had experienced a dramatic surge in popularity, dubbed "Beatlemania", in their native country in 1963. Capitol Records, the label which held the rights to their singles in the United States, initially declined to release them, however, deeming them unsuitable for the U.S. market. The band finally made their Hot 100 debut in January 1964, and by the end of the year, had achieved six number ones. After spending the first two weeks of 1965 in the top spot with "I Feel Fine", the Beatles returned to number one later in the year with "Eight Days a Week", "Ticket to Ride", "Help!" and "Yesterday", taking their total number of chart-toppers to ten within two years. Their total of 12 weeks at number one in 1965 was double that achieved by any other act.

Fourteen acts topped the Hot 100 for the first time in 1965. The success of the Beatles had triggered what was dubbed the British Invasion of the U.S. music scene, and six of the first-time chart-toppers were acts from the U.K.: Petula Clark, Freddie and the Dreamers, Wayne Fontana and the Mindbenders, Herman's Hermits, the Rolling Stones and the Dave Clark Five. The Righteous Brothers, Gary Lewis & the Playboys, the Temptations, the Four Tops, the Byrds, Sonny & Cher, the McCoys and Barry McGuire also reached number one for the first time in 1965. Herman's Hermits achieved two number ones during the year, but unusually neither single was released in their native U.K. The Rolling Stones also had two chart-toppers, the first of which, "(I Can't Get No) Satisfaction", tied with "Yesterday" for the year's longest-running number one, both singles spending four weeks atop the listing. In addition to the three British acts, the Supremes and the Byrds achieved multiple number ones during 1965. When the Supremes gained their third chart-topper of the year in June with "Back in My Arms Again", they became the first act to reach number one with five consecutive Hot 100 entries. The Dave Clark Five had the year's final number one with "Over and Over", which gave the group its sole week at number one on the Hot 100. Some of 1965's number ones have been considered among the greatest pop songs ever recorded. In 2004, Rolling Stone magazine ranked "(I Can't Get No) Satisfaction" at number 2 on its list of the 500 greatest songs of all time and "Yesterday" and "Help!" were also included in the top 30.

== Chart history ==
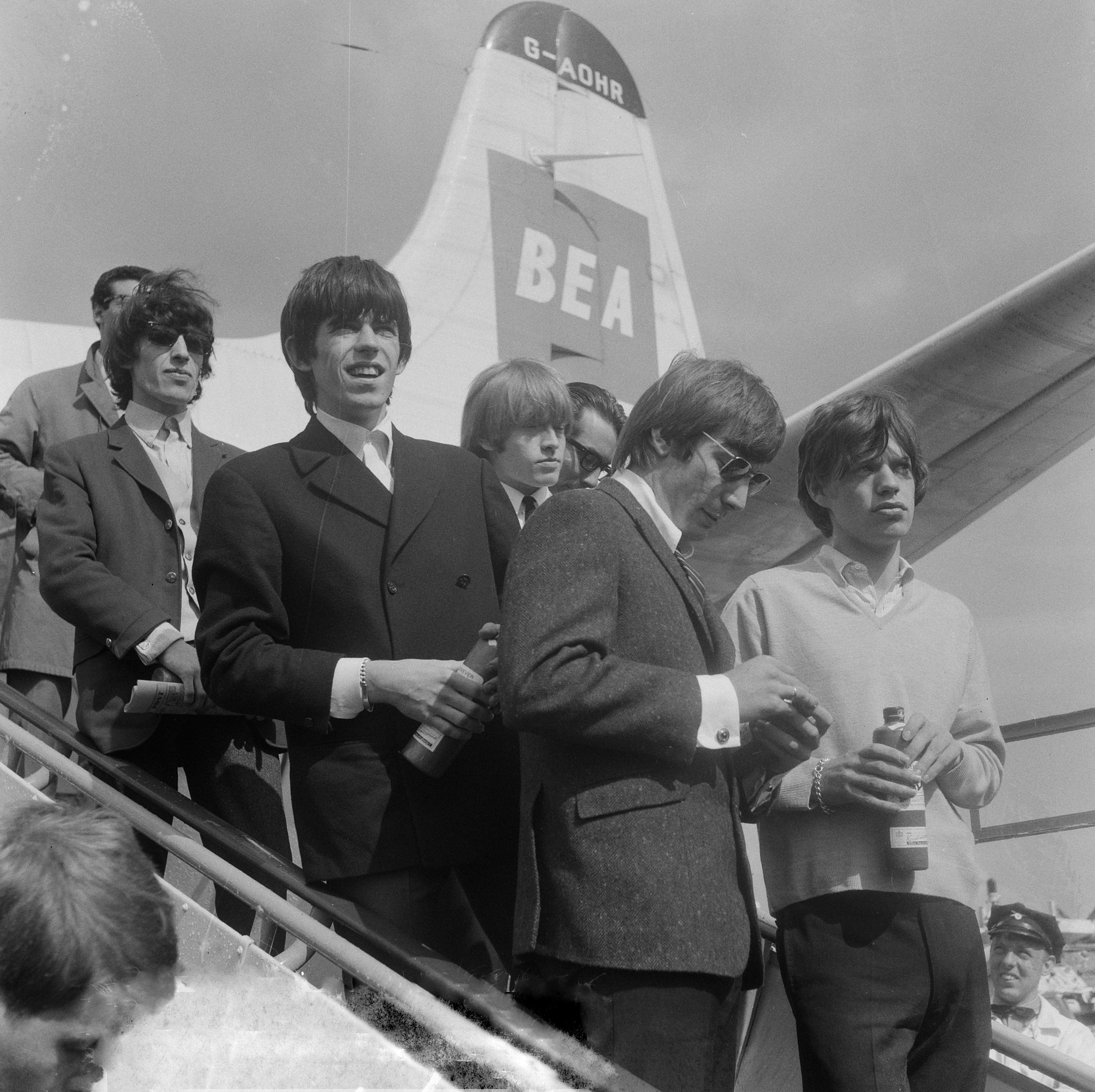
The Rolling Stones scored their first two number ones in 1965 with "(I Can't Get No) Satisfaction" and "Get Off of My Cloud".

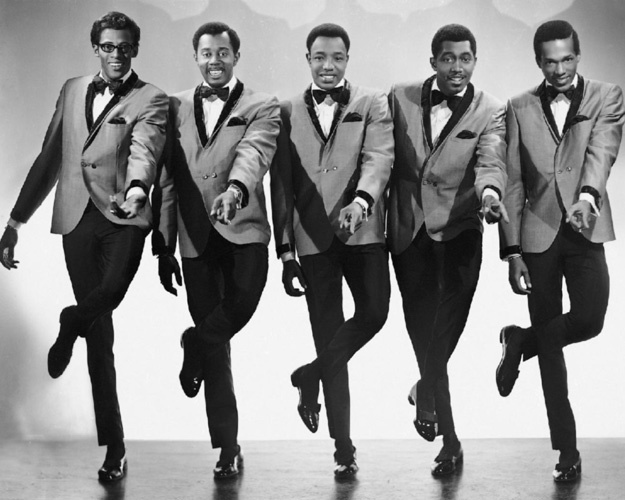
"My Girl" was the first number one for the Temptations.

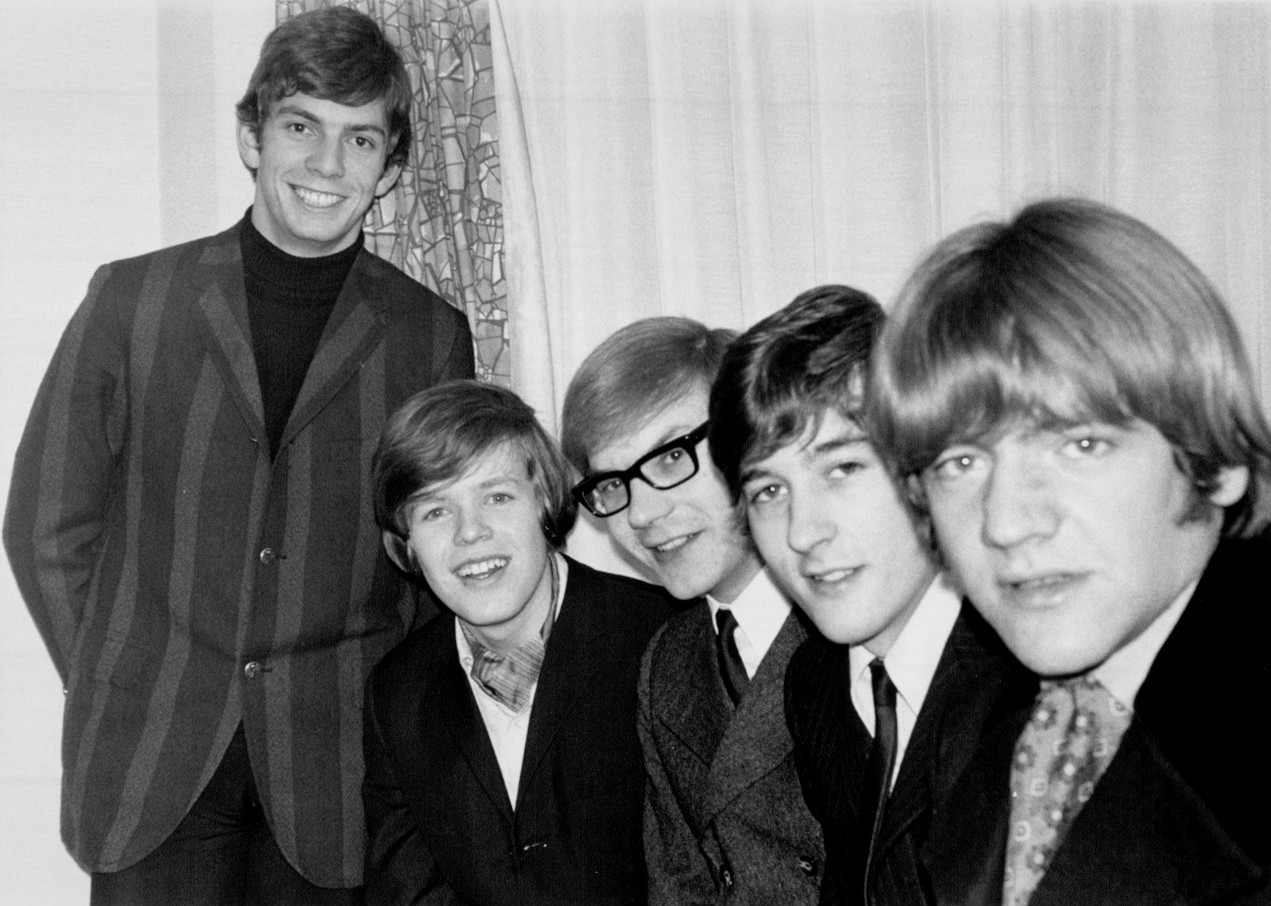
Herman's Hermits had two U.S. number ones with singles which were not released in their native UK.

Chart history
| No. (Note: The "No." column indicates the numerical sequence of number ones in Hot 100 history. "Re" indicates a single returning to number one.) | Issue date | Title | Artist(s) | Ref. |
|---|---|---|---|---|
| 125 | January 2 | "I Feel Fine" | The Beatles | |
| 125 | January 9 | "I Feel Fine" | The Beatles | |
| 124 (re) | January 16 | "Come See About Me" | The Supremes | |
| 126 | January 23 | "Downtown" | Petula Clark | |
| 126 | January 30 | "Downtown" | Petula Clark | |
| 127 | February 6 | "You've Lost That Lovin' Feelin'" | The Righteous Brothers | |
| 127 | February 13 | "You've Lost That Lovin' Feelin'" | The Righteous Brothers | |
| 128 | February 20 | "This Diamond Ring" | Gary Lewis & the Playboys | |
| 128 | February 27 | "This Diamond Ring" | Gary Lewis & the Playboys | |
| 129 | March 6 | "My Girl" | The Temptations | |
| 130 | March 13 | "Eight Days a Week" | The Beatles | |
| 130 | March 20 | "Eight Days a Week" | The Beatles | |
| 131 | March 27 | "Stop! In the Name of Love" | The Supremes | |
| 131 | April 3 | "Stop! In the Name of Love" | The Supremes | |
| 132 | April 10 | "I'm Telling You Now" | Freddie and the Dreamers | |
| 132 | April 17 | "I'm Telling You Now" | Freddie and the Dreamers | |
| 133 | April 24 | "The Game of Love" | Wayne Fontana and the Mindbenders | |
| 134 | May 1 | "Mrs. Brown, You've Got a Lovely Daughter" | Herman's Hermits | |
| 134 | May 8 | "Mrs. Brown, You've Got a Lovely Daughter" | Herman's Hermits | |
| 134 | May 15 | "Mrs. Brown, You've Got a Lovely Daughter" | Herman's Hermits | |
| 135 | May 22 | "Ticket to Ride" | The Beatles | |
| 136 | May 29 | "Help Me, Rhonda" | The Beach Boys | |
| 136 | June 5 | "Help Me, Rhonda" | The Beach Boys | |
| 137 | June 12 | "Back in My Arms Again" | The Supremes | |
| 138 | June 19 | "I Can't Help Myself (Sugar Pie Honey Bunch)" | Four Tops | |
| 139 | June 26 | "Mr. Tambourine Man" | The Byrds | |
| 138 (re) | July 3 | "I Can't Help Myself (Sugar Pie Honey Bunch)" | Four Tops | |
| 140 | July 10 | "(I Can't Get No) Satisfaction" | The Rolling Stones | |
| 140 | July 17 | "(I Can't Get No) Satisfaction" | The Rolling Stones | |
| 140 | July 24 | "(I Can't Get No) Satisfaction" | The Rolling Stones | |
| 140 | July 31 | "(I Can't Get No) Satisfaction" | The Rolling Stones | |
| 141 | August 7 | "I'm Henry VIII, I Am" | Herman's Hermits | |
| 142 | August 14 | "I Got You Babe" | Sonny & Cher | |
| 142 | August 21 | "I Got You Babe" | Sonny & Cher | |
| 142 | August 28 | "I Got You Babe" | Sonny & Cher | |
| 143 | September 4 | "Help!" | The Beatles | |
| 143 | September 11 | "Help!" | The Beatles | |
| 143 | September 18 | "Help!" | The Beatles | |
| 144 | September 25 | "Eve of Destruction" | Barry McGuire | |
| 145 | October 2 | "Hang On Sloopy" | The McCoys | |
| 146 | October 9 | "Yesterday" | The Beatles | |
| 146 | October 16 | "Yesterday" | The Beatles | |
| 146 | October 23 | "Yesterday" | The Beatles | |
| 146 | October 30 | "Yesterday" | The Beatles | |
| 147 | November 6 | "Get Off of My Cloud" | The Rolling Stones | |
| 147 | November 13 | "Get Off of My Cloud" | The Rolling Stones | |
| 148 | November 20 | "I Hear a Symphony" | The Supremes | |
| 148 | November 27 | "I Hear a Symphony" | The Supremes | |
| 149 | December 4 | "Turn! Turn! Turn! (To Everything There Is a Season)" | The Byrds | |
| 149 | December 11 | "Turn! Turn! Turn! (To Everything There Is a Season)" | The Byrds | |
| 149 | December 18 | "Turn! Turn! Turn! (To Everything There Is a Season)" | The Byrds | |
| 150 | December 25 | "Over and Over" | The Dave Clark Five | |

== Number-one artists ==
List of number-one artists by total weeks at number one
| Weeks at No. 1 | Artist |
|---|---|
| 12 | The Beatles |
| 6 | The Rolling Stones |
| 6 | The Supremes |
| 4 | Herman's Hermits |
| 4 | The Byrds |
| 3 | Sonny & Cher |
| 2 | Petula Clark |
| 2 | The Righteous Brothers |
| 2 | Gary Lewis & the Playboys |
| 2 | Freddie and the Dreamers |
| 2 | The Beach Boys |
| 2 | Four Tops |
| 1 | The Temptations |
| 1 | Wayne Fontana and the Mindbenders |
| 1 | Barry McGuire |
| 1 | The McCoys |
| 1 | The Dave Clark Five |

== See also ==
- 1965 in music
- Cashbox Top 100 number-one singles of 1965
- List of Billboard number-one singles
- List of Billboard Hot 100 top-ten singles in 1965
- List of Billboard Hot 100 number-one singles from 1958 to 1969
