= 1-2-3 (Len Barry song) =

Single by Len Barry

from the album 1-2-3
- B-side: "Bullseye"
- Released: October 1965
- Genre: Blue-eyed soul; pop
- Length: 2:24
- Label: Decca; Brunswick
- Songwriters: John Madara; David White; Len Barry
- Producers: John Madara; David White

Len Barry singles chronology
"Lip Sync (To the Tongue Twisters)" (1965)	"1-2-3" (1965)	"Like a Baby" (1966)

Licensed audio
- "1-2-3" on YouTube

"1-2-3" is a 1965 song recorded by American blue-eyed soul singer Len Barry, who co-wrote it with John Madara and David White. The latter two produced the recording. The chorus and accompaniment were arranged by Jimmy Wisner. The single was released in 1965 on the American Decca label.

At the time, the writers were sued by Motown, which claimed that the song was a reworking of the Holland–Dozier–Holland composition "Ask Any Girl", released by the Supremes the year before as the B-side of their single "Baby Love". The writers of "1-2-3" denied the claim but, after two years of litigation, they agreed to give the Motown writers 15% of the song's writing and publishing royalties, and Holland–Dozier–Holland are listed as co-authors by BMI. Years after this song was released, many people mistake this for a Smokey Robinson and The Miracles tune because Barry's vocals were similar to Robinson's on the recording.

The personnel on the original recording included Vinnie Bell, Bobby Eli, and Sal DiTroia on guitars; Joe Macho on bass; Artie Butler on percussion; Leon Huff on piano; Artie Kaplan on sax; Bill Tole and Roswell Rudd on trombones; Lee Morgan on trumpet; Fred Hubbard on clarinet; and Bobby Gregg on drums.

"1-2-3" reached number 2 in the US Billboard chart ("I Hear a Symphony" by the Supremes kept it from the number 1 spot). "1-2-3" also went to number 11 on the Billboard R&B chart. Overseas, the song peaked at number 3 on the UK Singles Chart. In addition, it was also a Top 10 hit in Ireland, where it went to number 8. It sold over 1.75 million copies, and was awarded a gold disc.

== Charts ==
Chart performance for "1-2-3"
Chart (1965–1966)	Peak position
Canada Top Singles (RPM)	3
France (IFOP)	40
Ireland (IRMA)	8
New Zealand (Lever Hit Parade)	6
South Africa (Springbok Radio)	4
UK (NME)	1
UK (Record Retailer)	3
US Billboard Hot 100	2
US Cash Box Top 100	1
US Hot R&B/Hip-Hop Songs (Billboard)	11

== Covers ==
- In 1966, Jane Morgan recorded a cover that peaked at No. 135 on the Bubbling Under Hot 100 chart.
- Also in 1966, Cilla Black recorded a version for her second album, Cilla Sings a Rainbow, produced by George Martin.
- In 1980, the disco/dance group Salazar, peaked at number 60 on the US Billboard Hot Dance/Disco chart with their version of the song.
- In 1994, it was sampled in Edwyn Collins' single "A Girl Like You", becoming the singer's biggest solo hit.

== See also ==
- List of Cash Box Top 100 number-one singles of 1965
