= List of song recordings featuring Hal Blaine =

This is a partial list of recordings of songs on which Hal Blaine, a session drummer in the Wrecking Crew, played.

== A ==
- "All I Have to Do Is Dream" (Bobbie Gentry and Glen Campbell)
- "All I Know" (Art Garfunkel)
- "All I Wanna Do" (The Beach Boys)
- "Along Comes Mary" (The Association)
- "America" (Simon & Garfunkel)
- "Andmoreagain" (Love)
- "Annie's Song" (John Denver)
- "Another Saturday Night" (Sam Cooke)
- "Any World (That I'm Welcome To)" (Steely Dan)
- "Aquarius/Let the Sunshine In" (The 5th Dimension) (Note: Grammy Award for Record of the Year (1970))
- "At the Zoo" (Simon & Garfunkel)

== B ==
- "Baby I Need Your Loving" (Johnny Rivers)
- "Baby Talk" (Jan and Dean)
- "Back Home Again" (John Denver)
- "Barbara Ann" (The Beach Boys)
- "Batman Theme" (The Marketts)
- "Be My Baby" (The Ronettes)
- "Be True to Your School" (The Beach Boys)
- "(The Best Part of) Breakin' Up" (The Ronettes)
- "Bless the Beasts and the Children" (The Carpenters)
- "Bossa Nova Baby" (Elvis Presley)
- "The Boxer" (Simon & Garfunkel)
- "Bridge over Troubled Water" (Simon & Garfunkel) (Note: Grammy Award for Record of the Year (1971))
- "By the Time I Get to Phoenix" (Tony Mann)
- "By the Time I Get to Phoenix" (Johnny Rivers)
- "By the Time I Get to Phoenix" (Glen Campbell)

== C ==
- "California Dreamin'" (The Mamas & the Papas)
- "California Girls" (The Beach Boys)
- "Calypso" (John Denver)
- "Can't Help Falling in Love" (Elvis Presley)
- "Can't You Hear the Song?" (Wayne Newton)
- "Cara Mia" (Jay and the Americans)
- "Caroline, No" (Brian Wilson)
- "Cecilia" (Simon & Garfunkel)
- "Cherish" (David Cassidy)
- "Christmas (Baby Please Come Home)" (Darlene Love)
- "Come a Little Bit Closer" (Jay and the Americans)
- "Come and Knock on Our Door" (theme from the television series Three's Company)
- "Come Back When You Grow Up" (Bobby Vee)
- "Come Saturday Morning" (The Sandpipers)
- "Congratulations" (Paul Simon), track 11 on 1972 album Paul Simon
- "Cotton Fields" (The Beach Boys)
- "Count Me In" (Gary Lewis & the Playboys)
- "Could It Be Forever" (David Cassidy)
- "Cracklin' Rosie" (Neil Diamond)
- "Creeque Alley" (The Mamas & the Papas)

== D ==
- "Da Doo Ron Ron" (The Crystals)
- "Daddy Don't You Walk So Fast" (Wayne Newton)
- "The Daily Planet" (Love)
- "Dance, Dance, Dance" (The Beach Boys)
- "Darlin'" (The Beach Boys)
- "Dead Man's Curve" (Jan and Dean)
- "Death of a Ladies' Man" (Leonard Cohen)
- "Dedicated to the One I Love" (The Mamas & the Papas)
- "Didn't We" (Richard Harris)
- "Dizzy" (Tommy Roe)
- "Do You Know Where You're Going To" (theme from the film Mahogany) (Diana Ross)
- "Doesn't Somebody Want to Be Wanted" (The Partridge Family)
- "Don't Pull Your Love" (Hamilton, Joe Frank & Reynolds)
- "The Door Is Still Open to My Heart" (Dean Martin)
- "Drag City" (Jan and Dean)
- "Dream a Little Dream of Me" (The Mamas & the Papas)
- "Drummer Man" (Nancy Sinatra)

== E ==
- "18 Yellow Roses" (Bobby Darin)
- "El Condor Pasa" (Simon & Garfunkel)
- "Elusive Butterfly" (Bob Lind)
- "Evangeline" (Emmylou Harris)
- "Eve of Destruction" (Barry McGuire)
- "Everybody Loves a Clown" (Gary Lewis & the Playboys)
- "Everybody Loves Somebody" (Dean Martin)
- "Everything That Touches You" (The Association)

== F ==
- "Fakin' It" (Simon & Garfunkel)
- "For All We Know" (The Carpenters)
- "Fun, Fun, Fun" (The Beach Boys)

== G ==
- "Galveston" (Glen Campbell)
- "Go Where You Wanna Go" (The Mamas & the Papas)
- "Go Where You Wanna Go" (The Fifth Dimension)
- "God Only Knows" (The Beach Boys)
- "Good Vibrations" (The Beach Boys)
- "Goodbye to Love" (The Carpenters)
- "Guantanamera" (The Sandpipers)
- "Guess I'm Dumb" (Glen Campbell)

== H ==
- "Half-Breed" (Cher)
- "Hurt So Bad"(Nelson Riddle)
- "The Happening" (The Supremes)
- "A Hazy Shade of Winter" (Simon & Garfunkel)
- "He's a Rebel" (The Crystals)
- "Help Me, Rhonda" (The Beach Boys)
- "Hey Little Cobra" (The Rip Chords)
- "Hey Jude" (Bing Crosby)
- "Him or Me – What's It Gonna Be?" (Paul Revere & the Raiders)
- "Hold Me, Thrill Me, Kiss Me" (Mel Carter)
- "Holly Holy" (Neil Diamond)
- "Homeward Bound" (Simon & Garfunkel)
- "Houston" (Dean Martin)
- "How Does That Grab You?" (Nancy Sinatra)
- "Hungry" (Paul Revere & the Raiders)
- "Hurting Each Other" (The Carpenters)

== I ==
- "I Am a Rock" (Simon and Garfunkel)
- "I Am... I Said" (Neil Diamond)
- "I Believe You" (The Carpenters)
- I Can't Go On (Chris and Craig)
- "I Couldn't Live Without Your Love" (Petula Clark)
- "I Get Around" (The Beach Boys)
- "I Got You Babe" (Sonny & Cher)
- "I Need You" (America)
- "I Need You" (Chris and Craig)
- "I Saw Her Again" (The Mamas & the Papas)
- "I Think I Love You" (The Partridge Family)
- "If I Can Dream" (Elvis Presley)
- "If I Were a Carpenter" (Bobby Darin)
- "I'll Meet You Halfway" (The Partridge Family)
- 'I'm Not Gonna Miss You" (Glen Campbell)
- "I'm Sorry" (John Denver)
- "In My Room" (The Beach Boys)
- "Indian Reservation (The Lament of the Cherokee Reservation Indian)" (Paul Revere & the Raiders)
- "It Never Rains in Southern California" (Albert Hammond)
- "It's Getting Better" (Cass Elliot)
- "It's Over" (Roy Orbison)
- "I Won't Last a Day Without You" (The Carpenters)

== J ==
- "Jam Up and Jelly Tight" (Tommy Roe)
- "Jambalaya (On the Bayou)" (The Carpenters)
- "Johnny Angel" (Shelley Fabares)
- "José Cuervo" (Shelly West)
- "Just Dropped In (To See What Condition My Condition Was In)" (The First Edition)

== K ==
- "Kicks" (Paul Revere & the Raiders)

== L ==
- "(Last Night) I Didn't Get to Sleep at All" (The 5th Dimension)
- "Leave Me Alone (Ruby Red Dress)" (Helen Reddy)
- "Let Him Run Wild" (The Beach Boys)
- "Let's Live for Today" (The Grass Roots)
- "Like a Sad Song" (John Denver)
- "Like to Get to Know You" (Spanky and Our Gang)
- "A Little Bit Me, a Little Bit You" (The Monkees)
- "The Little Girl I Once Knew" (The Beach Boys)
- "A Little Less Conversation" (Elvis Presley)
- "The Little Old Lady (from Pasadena)" (Jan and Dean)
- "Lizzie and the Rainman" (Tanya Tucker)
- "The Lonely Bull" (Herb Alpert and the Tijuana Brass)
- "Looking Through the Eyes of Love" (The Partridge Family)
- "Love Theme from Romeo and Juliet" (Henry Mancini)
- "Love Will Keep Us Together" (Captain & Tennille) (Note: Grammy Award for Record of the Year (1976))

== M ==
- "MacArthur Park" (Richard Harris)
- "Make Your Own Kind of Music" (Cass Elliot)
- "Mamma" (Connie Francis)
- "Mary, Mary" (The Monkees)
- "Midnight Confessions" (The Grass Roots)
- "Mona Lisa" (Nat King Cole) (remaster)
- "Monday, Monday" (The Mamas & the Papas)
- "Mother and Child Reunion" (Paul Simon)
- "Mountain of Love" (Johnny Rivers)
- "Mr. Tambourine Man" (The Byrds)
- "Mrs. Robinson" (Simon & Garfunkel) (Note: Grammy Award for Record of the Year (1969))
- "Muskrat Love" (Captain & Tennille)
- "My Love" (Petula Clark)
- "My Special Angel" (The Vogues)

== N ==
- "Never My Love" (The Association)
- "New Shabbos Waltz" (David Grisman and Andy Statman)
- "The Night Has a Thousand Eyes" (Bobby Vee)
- "No Matter What Shape (Your Stomach's In)" (The T-Bones)

== O ==
- "(Oly Oxen Free Free Free) Hide Go Seek" (The Honeys)
- "One Less Bell to Answer" (The 5th Dimension)
- "The Only Living Boy in New York" (Simon & Garfunkel)
- "Our Sweet Love" (The Beach Boys)
- "Out of Limits" (The Marketts)

== P ==
- "Paranoia Blues"
- "Poor Side of Town" (Johnny Rivers)
- "Papa Gene's Blue's" (Michael Nesmith), track 5 on 1966 album The Monkees

== R ==
- "Rainy Days and Mondays" (The Carpenters)
- "Red Roses for a Blue Lady" (Vic Dana)
- "Return to Sender" (Elvis Presley)
- "Rhythm of the Rain" (The Cascades)
- "Ringo" (Lorne Greene)
- "Rock-A-Hula Baby" (Elvis Presley)
- "The Rocky Horror Show" (original Roxy Theatre cast recording)
- "Run That Body Down" (Paul Simon), track 4 on 1972 album Paul Simon

== S ==
- "San Francisco (Be Sure to Wear Flowers in Your Hair)" (Scott McKenzie)
- "Save Your Heart for Me" (Gary Lewis & the Playboys)
- "She's a Fool" (Lesley Gore)
- "She's Just My Style" (Gary Lewis & the Playboys)
- "The Seventh Son" (Johnny Rivers)
- "Sleigh Ride" (The Ronettes)
- "Sloop John B" (The Beach Boys)
- "The Snake" (Al Wilson)
- "So Long, Frank Lloyd Wright" (Simon & Garfunkel)
- "Softly, as I Leave You" (Frank Sinatra)
- "Somethin' Stupid" (Frank and Nancy Sinatra)
- "Song Sung Blue" (Neil Diamond)
- "Sooner or Later" (The Grass Roots)
- "Stoned Soul Picnic" (The 5th Dimension)
- "Stoney End" (Barbra Streisand)
- "Strangers in the Night" (Frank Sinatra) (Note: Grammy Award for Record of the Year (1967))
- "Sugar Town" (Nancy Sinatra)
- "Sunshower" (Thelma Houston, prod: Jimmy Webb)
- "Superstar" (The Carpenters)
- "Sure Gonna Miss Her" (Gary Lewis & the Playboys)
- "Surf City" (Jan and Dean)

== T ==
- "A Taste of Honey" (Herb Alpert) (Note: Grammy Award for Record of the Year (1966))
- "Tears in the Morning" (The Beach Boys)
- "A Texas State of Mind" (David Frizzell and Shelly West)
- "Thank God I'm a Country Boy" (John Denver)
- "That's Life" (Frank Sinatra)
- "Then He Kissed Me" (The Crystals)
- "(They Long to Be) Close to You" (The Carpenters)
- "This Diamond Ring" (Gary Lewis & the Playboys)
- "This Girl Is a Woman Now" (Gary Puckett & the Union Gap)
- "This Is My Song" (Petula Clark)
- "Top of the World" (The Carpenters)
- "The Tracks of My Tears" (Johnny Rivers)
- "Turn Around, Look at Me" (The Vogues)

== U ==
- "Up, Up and Away" (The 5th Dimension) (Note: Grammy Award for Record of the Year (1968))

== V ==
- "Ventura Highway" (America)

== W ==
- "Wedding Bell Blues" (The 5th Dimension)
- "(Where Do I Begin?) Love Story" (Andy Williams)
- "Where the Boys Are" (Connie Francis)
- "We've Only Just Begun" (The Carpenters)
- "Windy" (The Association)
- "Woman, Woman" (Gary Puckett & The Union Gap)
- "Words of Love" (The Mamas & the Papas)
- "Workin' On a Groovy Thing" (The 5th Dimension)
- "Wouldn't It Be Nice" (The Beach Boys)

== Y ==
- "The Yard Went on Forever" (Richard Harris)
- "Yesterday Once More" (The Carpenters)
- "Young Girl" (Gary Puckett & The Union Gap)
- "(You're the) Devil in Disguise" (Elvis Presley)
- "You're the One" (The Vogues)
- "You're the Reason God Made Oklahoma" (David Frizzell and Shelly West)
- "You Never Done It Like That" (Captain & Tennille)

== Z ==
- "Zip-a-Dee-Doo-Dah" (Bob B. Soxx & the Blue Jeans)

== Notes ==
All of the dates shown are the following year of the award. The Grammy year preceded the television broadcast by several months.

== Sources ==
- Hartman, Kent (2012). The Wrecking Crew: The Inside Story of Rock and Roll's Best-Kept Secret. St. Martin's Press. ISBN 9780312619749.
- Blaine, Hal; Goggin, David (as "Mr. Bonzai") (2010). Schwartz, David M. (ed.). Hal Blaine and the Wrecking Crew: The Story of the World's Most Recorded Musician (3rd ed.). Rebeats Publications. ISBN 9781888408126.
