= The Ron Hicklin Singers =

1960s-1980s group of Los Angeles studio singers

The Ron Hicklin Singers were a group of Los Angeles studio singers contracted and organized by Ron Hicklin. They are mostly known as the real singers behind the background vocals on The Partridge Family recordings.

In Los Angeles studio circles in the 1960s through 1980s, they were the vocal equivalent of (and often worked with) The Wrecking Crew, performing backup vocals on thousands of songs, TV and movie themes, and as lead (while remaining anonymous) singers on thousands of radio and television commercials.

== Members ==
The core group usually consisted of (by voice type):

- Ron Hicklin - lead tenor
- Tom Bähler - tenor
- John Bähler - tenor
- Stan Farber - tenor
- Jim Gilstrap - tenor
- Gene Morford - bass
- Al Capps - bass
- Sally Stevens - soprano
- Edie Lehmann - soprano
- Sandie Hall - soprano
- Carolyn Willis - soprano
- Jackie Ward - alto
- Debbie Hall - alto
- Myrna Matthews - alto

However, this core group was often augmented with other specialist vocalists such as:

- Jim Haas - tenor
- Gene Merlino - tenor
- Jerry Whitman - tenor
- Thurl Ravenscroft - bass (voice of Kellogg's Tony the Tiger of Frosted Flakes cereal for 50 years, and the vocalist for "You're A Mean One, Mr. Grinch")
- Mitch Gordon - bass
- Bob Tebow - bass
- Andra Willis - soprano
- Linda Dangcil - soprano
- Bob Zwirn - baritone

== Motion pictures, television and radio work ==
The group performed themes for major motion pictures in the 1960s, 1970s, 1980s, and 1990s.

- M*A*S*H (film)
- Butch Cassidy and the Sundance Kid, "South American Getaway" written by Burt Bacharach
- The Hunt For Red October, written by Basil Poledouris
- Dances With Wolves, written by John Barry
- Apollo 13, written by James Horner
- Glory, written by James Horner
- Hook, written by John Williams
- Dirty Harry, and Magnum Force, written by Lalo Schifrin
- Out of Africa, written by John Barry
- Death Game, "Dear Old Dad" written by Jimmie Haskell with lyrics by Iris Rainer Dart
- The Mosquito Coast, "Saviour, Like a Shepherd Lead Us" written by William Batchelder Bradbury
- Rosemary's Baby

The group also sang the themes for major hit-TV shows of the period:

- Love, American Style, with lead vocalist John Bähler (opening theme)
- Batman, (opening theme)
- Alvin & The Chipmunks
- Flipper
- That Girl, season 5 opening
- Happy Days, for which Jim Haas sang lead (opening theme)
- Laverne & Shirley, along with lead vocalist Cyndi Grecco (opening theme)
- Wonder Woman, with John Bähler singing lead (season 2 opening)
- Angie, along with lead vocalist Maureen McGovern (opening theme)

In addition, they sang many commercial vocals, including United States advertising campaigns for:

- Kawasaki - "Kawasaki, Let the Good Times Roll"
- Datsun - "Drive a Datsun, then Decide"
- McDonald's - "You Deserve a Break Today", written by Kenny Karen
- Wheaties - "Go Tell Your Mama What The Big Boys Eat", Clio Award Winner
- California Raisins - "Yum, Yum", 2 Clio Awards
- Gatorade - "Gatorade Is Thirst Aid For That Deep Down Body Thirst"

Radio and television station-ID jingle companies throughout the last four decades of the 20th century used the group in their productions, including:

- The Heller Corporation
- Killer Music Broadcast Division
- JAM Creative Productions
- TM Productions (now known as TM Studios, a division of Dial Global Media) on syndicated-radio ID jingle packages including:
  - Hot Hits
  - Fusion
  - The "You" campaign
  - Good Feelings

== Noteworthy recording work ==
The group also sang on recordings credited to:

- Johnny Mandel - "Suicide Is Painless", Theme from M*A*S*H
- The Brady Kids
- Cher - "Dark Lady"
- The DeFranco Family - "Heartbeat - It's a Lovebeat"
- Climax featuring Sonny Geraci - "Precious and Few" (No. 1, U.S. Cash Box Top 100)
- Anita Kerr Singers - the group's mid-'60s-to-early '70s lineup featured Gene Merlino (tenor) and Bob Tebow (bass); Jackie Ward (alto) joined the group in 1969, replacing B. J. Baker
- Gary Lewis & the Playboys - "This Diamond Ring" (No 1, U.S. Billboard Hot 100), "Count Me In", "Save Your Heart For Me" (No 1, U.S. Billboard Easy Listening), "She's Just My Style", "Everybody Loves A Clown". Ron Hicklin basically sings a duet with Gary Lewis with Ron's vocals overdubbing.
- Mark Lindsay - "Arizona" (RIAA Gold) and "Silver Bird"
- The Partridge Family - "I Think I Love You"
- Gary Puckett & The Union Gap - "Young Girl" (No. 1, U.S. Cash Box Top 100), "Woman, Woman" (No. 3, U.S. Cash Box Top 100), "Over You" (No. 5, U.S. Cash Box Top 100), and "Lady Willpower" (No. 1, U.S. Cash Box Top 100)
- Paul Revere & the Raiders - "Indian Reservation" (RIAA Gold)
- Sammy Davis Jr. - "The Candy Man" (RIAA Gold)
- Johnny Mathis - "There, I Said it Again"
- Neil Diamond - "You Don't Bring Me Flowers" (RIAA Platinum), "Holly Holy", "In My Lifetime"

== Works of selected members ==
The Bähler Brothers were part of the singing group hired by Ron Hicklin on Hugo Montenegro's Albums.

The Bähler Brothers, Jackie Ward, and Ron Hicklin joined David Cassidy as the singers on the Partridge Family.

- Hugo Montenegro's The Good, the Bad and the Ugly Theme
- "MacArthur Park"
- "Suicide Is Painless", Johnny Mandel's theme to the 1970 film M*A*S*H, sung by Ian Freebairn-Smith, Ron Hicklin, John Bähler, and Tom Bähler
- Ron Hicklin did 4 decades as part of the Chipmunks

Member Jackie Ward also had a hit on her own as Robin Ward with the 1963 hit "Wonderful Summer".

== Later Careers ==
John Bähler lives in Branson, Missouri and conducts the "new" Lawrence Welk orchestra as well as running Portraits By Bähler.

Bähler's wife, Janet Lennon-Bähler of the Lennon Sisters, still tours in casinos and resorts around the country as part of an extensive nostalgia circuit, bringing music of the 1940s and 1950s to a new audience.

Tom Bähler, a long-time close associate of composer Quincy Jones as well as being associate producer and arranger of "We Are the World", lives in California's Santa Ynez Valley north of Los Angeles and continues to occasionally produce as well as record. He is also a songwriter of renown, having penned the Bobby Sherman hit "Julie, Do Ya Love Me" and Michael Jackson's "She's Out of My Life".

Ron Hicklin himself retired from the business in the mid-1990s, and lives in Vonore, Tennessee with his wife, Trudi.

== Discography ==
Partial chronological list of albums containing one or more cuts with one or more Ron Hicklin Singers:

Year	Album	Group / Artist	Label	RIAA
1960	Crazy Times	Gene Vincent	Capitol	
1960	Along The Trail	The Eligibles	Capitol	
1960	Love Is A Gamble	The Eligibles	Capitol	
1961	When I Fall in Love	The Lettermen	Capitol	
1962	Mike Fright	The Eligibles	Capitol	
1963	The Singles Collection - Volume 1	Ray Conniff	Columbia	
1964	Mustang!	The Zip-Codes	Liberty	
1965	This Diamond Ring	Gary Lewis & The Playboys	Liberty	
1965	Everybody Love's a Clown	Gary Lewis & The Playboys	Liberty	
1965	A Session With Gary Lewis and the Playboys	Gary Lewis & The Playboys	Liberty	
1966	She's Just My Style	Gary Lewis & The Playboys	Liberty	
1966	The Monkees	The Monkees	Colgems	5× Platinum
1967	More Of The Monkees	The Monkees	Colgems	5× Platinum
1967	The Yellow Balloon	The Yellow Balloon	Canterbury	
1968	Woman, Woman	Gary Puckett & The Union Gap	Columbia	
1968	Gary Puckett & The Union Gap	Gary Puckett & The Union Gap	Columbia	
1968	Incredible	Gary Puckett & The Union Gap	Columbia	
1968	On Tap, In The Can, Or In The Bottle	Hank Thompson and The Brazos Valley Boys	Dot	
1969	Hair	Stan Kenton	Capitol	
1969	Moog Power	Hugo Montenegro	RCA	
1969	Touching You, Touching Me	Neil Diamond	Uni	
1970	Let It Be	Bud Shank with The Bob Alcivar Singers	World Pacific Jazz	
1970	The Partridge Family Album	The Partridge Family	Bell	Gold
1970	Young	Ralph Carmichael and The Young People	Light	
1971	Up to Date	The Partridge Family	Bell	Gold
1971	Sound Magazine	The Partridge Family	Bell	Gold
1971	A Partridge Family Christmas Card	The Partridge Family	Bell	Gold
1971	His Great Hits	Gábor Szabó	Impulse!	
1971	On Any Sunday	Dominic Frontiere	Bell	
1971	Indian Reservation	Paul Revere & the Raiders	Columbia	
1971	Gandharva	Beaver & Krause	Warner Bros.	
1971	Wings	Michel Colombier	A&M	
1971	The Class of Nineteen Hundred and Seventy One	Jack Daugherty	A&M	
1971	I'd Like to Teach the World to Sing	Ray Conniff	Columbia	
1972	Shopping Bag	The Partridge Family	Bell	Gold
1972	The Partridge Family Notebook	The Partridge Family	Bell	Gold
1972	Climax featuring Sonny Geraci	Climax	Rocky Road Records	
1972	Billie Joe Thomas	B.J. Thomas	Scepter Records	
1972	Raised on Records	P.F. Sloan	Mums	
1972	D/B/A Crow	David Wagner	Amaretto	
1972	Orchestra Arranged and Conducted By Michel Legrand	Sarah Vaughan	Mainstream Records	
1972	Without You	Ray Conniff	Columbia	
1972	Love Theme From The Godfather	Ray Conniff	Columbia	
1972	I Can See Clearly Now	Ray Conniff	Columbia	
1972	Alone Again (Naturally)	Ray Conniff	Columbia	
1973	Crossword Puzzle	The Partridge Family	Bell	Gold
1973	Gram Parsons	Gram Parsons	Reprise	
1973	Ringo	Ringo Starr	Apple	
1973	Live at the Greek Theatre	Vikki Carr	Columbia	
1973	The Last Thing On My Mind	Austin Roberts	Chelsea	
1973	Miss America	Vikki Carr	Columbia	
1973	Vagabonds Roost	Sherman Hayes	Capitol	
1973	Naturally	Judy Lynn	Amaretto	
1973	Harmony	Ray Conniff	Columbia	
1973	The Way We Were	Ray Conniff	Columbia	
1973	You Are the Sunshine of My Life	Ray Conniff	Columbia	
1974	Grievous Angel	Gram Parsons	Reprise	
1974	Dark Lady	Cher	MCA Records	
1974	Stop and Smell the Roses	Mac Davis	Columbia	
1974	A Little Bit Of Love	Paul Williams	A&M	
1974	Touch Me	John Davidson	20th Century	
1974	The Happy Sound of Ray Conniff	Ray Conniff	Columbia	
1975	Rich Man's Woman	Elkie Brooks	A&M	
1975	What I Did For Love	Jack Jones	RCA Victor	
1975	John R. Cash	Johnny Cash	Columbia	
1975	Introducing Sparks	Sparks	Columbia	
1975	Ordinary Fool	Paul Williams	A&M	
1975	Un Tonto Común	Paul Williams	A&M	
1975	Two Sides of the Moon	Keith Moon	MCA/Polydor	
1975	Another Done Somebody Wrong Song	Ray Conniff	Columbia	
1975	I Write the Songs	Ray Conniff	Columbia	
1975	Laughter in the Rain	Ray Conniff	Columbia	
1975	Love Will Keep Us Together	Ray Conniff	Columbia	
1976	Act like Nothing's Wrong	Al Kooper	United Artists	
1976	Making Our Dreams Come True	Cyndi Grecco	Private	
1976	Shaun Cassidy	Shaun Cassidy	Warner Bros.	Platinum
1976	Slow Down World	Donovan	Epic	
1976	Cry Tough	Nils Lofgren	A&M	
1976	Blue Moves	Elton John	MCA/Rocket	Platinum
1976	Young and Rich	The Tubes	A&M	
1976	A Song Is A Gentle Thing	Deanna Edwards	Teleketics	
1976	Pictures & Rhymes	Jim Weatherly	ABC	
1976	A Little Bit Of Love	Paul Williams	A&M	
1976	Dolenz, Jones, Boyce & Hart	Dolenz, Jones, Boyce & Hart	Capitol	
1976	After the Lovin	Ray Conniff	Columbia	
1976	Send in the Clowns	Ray Conniff	Columbia	
1976	Theme From SWAT and Other TV Themes	Ray Conniff	Columbia	
1977	He Touched Me	Tennessee Ernie Ford	Capitol	
1977	Crepusculo En Oklahoma = Oklahoma Twilight	Wayne Parker	Ariola America	
1977	Washington: Behind Closed Doors (Original Music From)	Dominic Frontiere	ABC	
1977	The Full Life	Jack Jones	RCA Victor	
1977	Born Late	Shaun Cassidy	Warner Bros.	Platinum
1977	Exitos Latinos	Ray Conniff	Columbia	
1978	Under Wraps	Shaun Cassidy	Warner Bros.	
1978	Dream	Captain and Tennille	A&M	
1978	Leif Garrett	Leif Garrett	Atlantic	
1978	Hard Love	Shaun Cassidy	Warner Bros.	
1978	Jaded Virgin	Marshall Chapman	Epic	
1978	Grease	Grease	RSO	8× Platinum
1978	You Don't Bring Me Flowers	Neil Diamond	Columbia	2× Platinum
1978	Ray Conniff Plays The Bee Gees & Other Great Hits	Ray Conniff	Columbia	
1979	Groovin' You	Harvey Mason	Arista	
1979	No One Home	Lalo Schifrin	Tabu	
1979	Gershwin '79	Westside Strutters	Parachute	
1979	Lucky Day	Alan Price	Jet	
1979	Portrait Of Love	Jon Byron	Light	
1979	Apocalypse Now - Original Motion Picture Soundtrack	Carmine Coppola & Francis Coppola	Elektra	
1979	Jerry Lee Lewis	Jerry Lee Lewis	Warner Bros.	
1979	I Will Survive	Ray Conniff	Columbia	
1980	Ghost Riders	Outlaws	Arista	
1980	Roadie (Original Motion Picture Sound Track)	Various	Warner Bros.	
1980	No More Dirty Deals	The Johnny Van Zant Band	Polydor	
1980	The Lord's Prayer - Teach Us To Pray	Reba Rambo & Dony McGuire	Light	
1980	Rising Sun	Alan Price	Jet	
1980	Make Your Move	Captain & Tennille	RTV	Gold
1980	Rise Again...He's Alive	Paul Johnson Vocal Band	MCA	
1980	Trilogy: Past, Present & Future	Frank Sinatra	Reprise	
1981	Made in America	The Carpenters	A&M	
1981	Dark Orchid	Sammy Nestico	Palo Alto	
1981	David Essex – Be-Bop The Future	David Essex	Mercury	
1982	The Dukes Of Hazzard	Various	Scotti Bros	
1982	So Far...So Good	Stella Parton	Town House	
1982	The Best of Jerry Lee Lewis Featuring 39 and Holding	Jerry Lee Lewis	Elektra	
1982	Messiah Bright Morning Star	Reba Rambo & Dony McGuire	Light	
1982	Amor, Amor	Ray Conniff	Columbia	
1983	Voice of the Heart	The Carpenters	A&M	Gold
1983	Got My Eye On You	Johnny Koonce	A&M	
1983	Fantástico	Ray Conniff	Columbia	
1984	And I Love You So	Howard Keel	PolyTel	
1985	With Love: For Yesterday, Today & Tomorrow	Howard Keel	PolyTel	
1993	When My Heart Finds Christmas	Harry Connick Jr.	Columbia	3× Platinum
1993	Swing Kids (Music From The Motion Picture Soundtrack)	James Horner	Milan	
1995	When You Wish Upon A Chipmunk	The Chipmunks	Chipmunk	
1995	Casper (Music From The Motion Picture Soundtrack)	James Horner	MCA	
1995	Apollo 13 (Music From The Motion Picture)	James Horner	MCA	
1996	Live A Little, Love A Little & The Trouble With Girls & Charro! & Change Of Habit	Elvis Presley	RCA	
1998	Breath Of Heaven: A Christmas Collection	Vince Gill with Patrick Williams and His Orchestra	MCA	
2004	Come To The Sunshine: Soft Pop Nuggets From The WEA Vaults	Various	Rhino	
2006	Here Comes Inspiration	Paul Williams	East Central One	
2007	The Singles Collection - Volume 2	Ray Conniff	Columbia	
2010	Carnival of Sound	Jan & Dean	Rhino	

There were also multiple albums for each below:

- Percy Faith Orchestra and Chorus
- Henry Mancini Orchestra and Chorus
