= Gary Lewis (musician) =

American musician (born 1945)

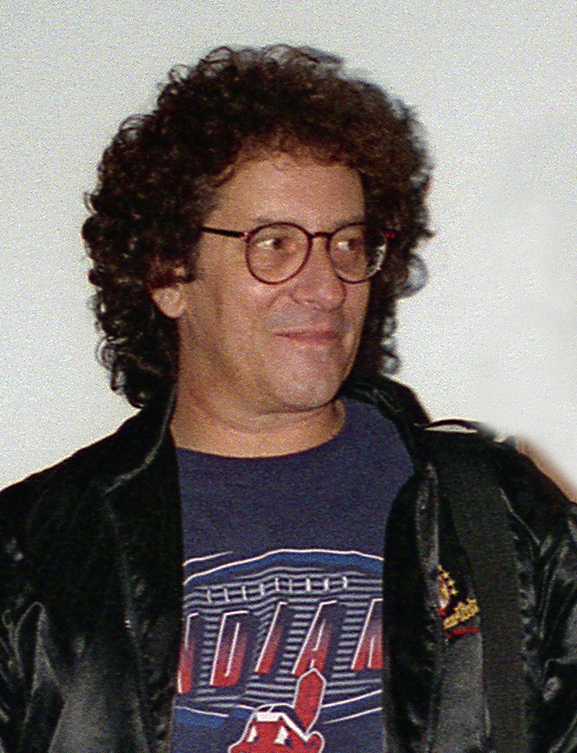
- Lewis in 1996

Background information
- Born: Gary Harold Lee Levitch; July 31, 1945 (age 81); Newark, New Jersey, U.S.
- Genre: Pop rock
- Occupation: Musician
- Instruments: Vocals; drums; guitar
- Years active: 1960s–present
- Member of: Gary Lewis & the Playboys
- Website: garylewisandtheplayboys.com

Gary Lewis (born Gary Harold Lee Levitch; July 31, 1945) is an American musician who was the leader of Gary Lewis & the Playboys.

== Early life ==
Gary Lewis is the son of Jerry Lewis and singer Patti Palmer. His mother, who was performing at the time with the Ted Fio Rito Orchestra, intended to name him after her favorite actor, Cary Grant, but her son became "Gary" as the result of a clerical error. He received a set of drums as a gift for his 15th birthday in 1960. When he was 18, Lewis formed the band "Gary and the Playboys" with four friends. Joking at the lateness of bandmates to practice, Lewis referred to them as "playboys", and the name stuck.

Lewis was the drummer, and Dave Walker was the singer and guitarist. Gary's mother was quietly funding the purchases of equipment as they believed Gary's father would not support the band financially. Without the Lewis cachet, the band was relatively anonymous. Even though he lived down the street from the Lewis family, producer Snuff Garrett was not aware of the band until a mutual friend, conductor Les Brown, informed him that the group was appearing at the Space Bar in Tomorrowland at Disneyland and that Garrett should give them a listen.

== Gary Lewis & the Playboys ==
Seeing an opportunity to capitalize on the Lewis name, Garrett put the band into the studio to develop, still financed by Gary's mother. Garrett pushed Lewis to improve his drumming skill, even getting Buddy Rich to tutor him, and, more importantly, made Lewis the singer and therefore the focal point of the group. By Lewis' own admission, his natural singing voice was not one of his strengths, and Garrett employed overdubbing techniques in the studio to enhance it. "This Diamond Ring" hit number one on the Billboard Hot 100 on February 20, 1965, making Lewis an instant star. Besides The Lovin' Spoonful, the group was the only act during the 1960s to have its first seven Hot 100 releases each reach that chart's top 10.

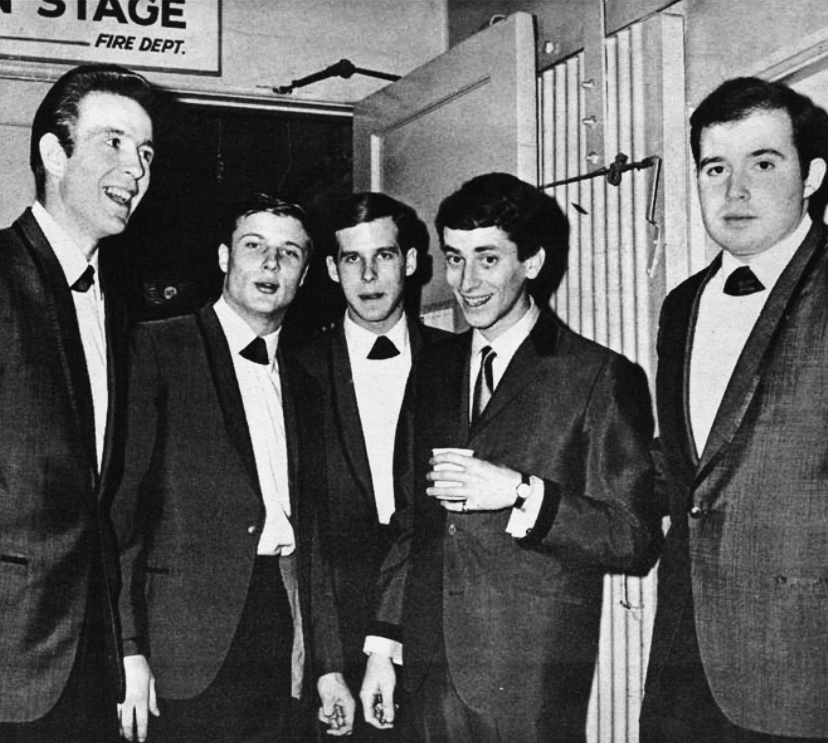
Gary Lewis (2nd from right) with The Playboys 1966.

In addition to "This Diamond Ring", his hits include "Count Me In," the only non-British Commonwealth record in the Hot 100's top 10 on May 8, 1965, (number two); "Save Your Heart for Me" (number two); "Everybody Loves a Clown" (number four); "She's Just My Style" (number three); "Sure Gonna Miss Her" (number nine); and "Green Grass" (number eight). Lewis says he composed "Everybody Loves a Clown" as a gift for his father's birthday. He believed the song was too good, so instead of giving it as a gift, he recorded it.

By 1966, Lewis was exclusively singing, replaced on the drums by, among others, Jim Keltner. Though he had the unusual talent of being able to play drums and sing lead simultaneously, Lewis opted to switch to guitar for concerts because the limitations of 1960s stage setups made it hard for audiences to fully see drummers, and he felt he should be more connected to the audience due to his role as frontman.

== Army ==
In January 1967, his career was put on hold when he was drafted into the U.S. Army serving during the Vietnam War with the Eighth Army, until 1968. During his two years of service, he spent two months at the Saigon Airport and the remainder of the time in South Korea. Lewis has stated that he was reluctant to go to Vietnam, but he credits the Army with being the time when he "grew up."

Lewis released a solo album in 1967 for Liberty Records called Listen!.

== Post-Army ==
He returned to performing and recording, but did not recapture his earlier success and five releases by the band that year peaked from 13th to 39th.

In 1971, Lewis took a break from performing, operating a music shop in the San Fernando Valley and giving drumming lessons. In 1974, an attempt to start a band called Medecine, with Bill Cowsill of the Cowsills was not successful.

His musical career was later marketed as a "nostalgia act" with appearances on his father's Labor Day telethons for the Muscular Dystrophy Association, including the 2010 telethon which was his father's final one as host. In January 2012, Lewis released a new single, "You Can't Go Back".

Lewis resumed touring in the 1980s, with various incarnations of the Playboys, generally featuring no other original members. One of the tours was scheduled to last nine months.

In the summer of 2013, Lewis, along with a group of 1960s musicians including Gary Puckett (Gary Puckett & The Union Gap), Chuck Negron (formerly of Three Dog Night), Mark Lindsay (former lead singer of Paul Revere & the Raiders), and The Turtles featuring Flo & Eddie, toured 47 cities in Paradise Artist's "Happy Together" tour. As of 2025, Gary Lewis and the Playboys are still touring the world on their own and occasionally with other popular acts of the 1950s, '60s, and '70s. The group performs on cruise ships, at casinos, festivals, fairs, and corporate events.

== Film appearances ==
Gary Lewis appeared in a credited role singing "The Land of La-la-la" with his father in Rock-A-Bye Baby (1958), where he played Jerry Lewis as a boy. He also was seen in the movie The Family Jewels (1965). He was cast in his father's movie The Nutty Professor (1963), but his part was cut out of the film because he appeared in a bar and was not of legal age to drink alcohol at the time.

== Personal life ==
In 2009, on the nationally syndicated program Inside Edition, Gary met his half-sister Suzan Kleinman, who had learned from DNA testing results that they are related siblings, the children of comedy star Jerry Lewis.

Lewis and his family reside in Rush, New York.

== Discography ==
=== With Gary Lewis & the Playboys ===
==== Singles ====
A-side	B-side	Year
"This Diamond Ring"	"Hard to Find" (later replaced with "Tijuana Wedding") (both are non-LP tracks)	1965
"Count Me In"	"Little Miss Go-Go"	1965
"Doin' the Flake"	"This Diamond Ring" / "Little Miss Go-Go"	1965
"Save Your Heart for Me"	"Without a Word of Warning"	1965
"Everybody Loves a Clown"	"Time Stands Still"	1965
"She's Just My Style"	"I Won't Make That Mistake Again"	1965
"Sure Gonna Miss Her"	"I Don't Wanna Say Goodnight" (non-LP track)	1966
"Green Grass"	"I Can Read Between the Lines"	1966
"My Heart's Symphony"	"Tina (I Held You in My Arms)"	1966
"(You Don't Have To) Paint Me a Picture"	"Looking For the Stars"	1966
"Where Will the Words Come From"	"May the Best Man Win"	1966
"Way Way Out" (Way...Way Out Promo Release)		1967
"The Loser (with a Broken Heart)"	"Ice Melts in the Sun"	1967
"Girls in Love"	"Let's Be More Than Friends"	1967
"Jill"	"New in Town"	1967
"Has She Got The Nicest Eyes"	"Happiness"	1967
"Sealed with a Kiss"	"Sara Jane"	1968
"Main Street"	"C.C. Rider"	1968
"Rhythm of the Rain"	"Mister Memory"	1969
"Hayride"	"Gary's Groove"	1969
"I Saw Elvis Presley Last Night"	"Something is Wrong"	1969
"I'm on the Right Road Now"	"Great Balls of Fire"	1970
"Then Again Maybe" (Gary Lewis solo)	"Peace of Mind"	1972
"One Good Woman" (Gary Lewis solo)	"Ooh Baby"	1975

==== Albums ====
Year	Album
1965	This Diamond Ring
1965	A Session with Gary Lewis and the Playboys
1965	Everybody Loves a Clown
1965	She's Just My Style
1966	Hits Again
1966	(You Don't Have To) Paint Me a Picture
1967	New Directions
1967	Listen!
1967	Gary Lewis & The Playboys
1968	Gary Lewis Now!
1969	Rhythm of the Rain/Hayride
1969	Close Cover Before Playing
1969	Rhythm!
1969	I'm on the Right Road Now

=== Solo ===
==== Singles ====
A-side	B-side	Year
"Then Again Maybe" (Gary Lewis solo)	"Peace of Mind"	1972
"One Good Woman" (Gary Lewis solo)	"Ooh Baby"	1975
