= A Session with Gary Lewis and the Playboys =

Studio album by Gary Lewis & the Playboys
- Released: August 1965
- Recorded: 1965
- Genre: Rock; pop; rock and roll
- Length: 27:41
- Label: Liberty Records
- Producer: Snuff Garrett

Gary Lewis & the Playboys chronology
| This Diamond Ring (1965) | A Session with Gary Lewis and the Playboys (1965) | Everybody Loves a Clown (1965) |

Singles from A Session with Gary Lewis and the Playboys
- 1. "Count Me In" Released: March 15, 1965; 2. "Save Your Heart for Me" Released: June 11, 1965

Professional ratings
Review scores
| Source | Rating |
|---|---|
| Allmusic | 3.5/5 stars |

A Session with Gary Lewis and the Playboys is the second studio album by American band Gary Lewis & the Playboys, and was released in 1965 on Liberty Records, LRP-3419. It is the second of three charting albums released by the band in 1965, and it was the band's highest-charting album—reaching number 18 on the Billboard 200. Two singles from this album, "Count Me In" and the Brian Hyland cover "Save Your Heart for Me", both reached number 2 on the Billboard Hot 100.

== Background ==
Following up on the success of the single "This Diamond Ring" and their debut album of the same name, Lewis and the band went back into the studio with producer Snuff Garrett and arranger Leon Russell and recorded their second album, A Session with Gary Lewis and the Playboys, which was released in August 1965. While the album did have several original songs, it, like their debut, mainly relied on covers of recent popular songs by artists as diverse as The Yardbirds, Ricky Nelson, The Everly Brothers, and Freddy Cannon. Riding on this success, Lewis would release his third charting album, Everybody Loves a Clown, only three months later.

== Track listing ==
1. "Count Me In" (Glen D. Hardin) – 2:20
2. "Travelin' Man" (Jerry Fuller) – 2:07
3. "Concrete And Clay" (Brian Parker, Tommy Moeller) – 2:25
4. "Walk Right Back" (Sonny Curtis) – 2:00
5. "For Your Love" (Graham Gouldman) – 2:40
6. "Save Your Heart for Me" (Gary Geld, Peter Udell) – 1:54
7. "Palisades Park" (Chuck Barris) – 2:04
8. "Without A Word Of Warning" (Gary Lewis, Leon Russell, Tom Lesslie) – 2:05
9. "Voodoo Woman" (Bobby Goldsboro) – 2:20
10. "Free Like Me" (Hardin) – 2:20
11. "Little Miss Go-Go" (Russell, Louis Yule Brown, Lesslie) – 2:21
12. "Runaway" (Del Shannon, Max Crook) – 2:19

== Personnel ==
Gary Lewis and the Playboys

- Gary Lewis – vocals, drums
- Dave Walker – rhythm guitar, vocals
- Dave Costell – lead guitar
- Carl Radle – bass
- John R. West – electric cordovox

Additional musicians

- Hal Blaine – drums on track 8
- Leon Russell – keyboards

Technical

- Snuff Garrett – music producer, liner notes
- Leon Russell – arranger
- "Bones" Howe – engineer
- Studio Five – cover design
- Ron Joy – photography

== Charts ==
Album – Billboard (United States)

| Year | Chart | Position |
|---|---|---|
| 1965 | Billboard 200 | 18 |

=== Singles ===
| Year | Single | Billboard Hot 100 |
|---|---|---|
| 1965 | "Count Me In" | 2 |
| 1965 | "Save Your Heart for Me" | 2 |
