= Everybody Loves a Clown =

Everybody Loves a Clown may refer to:

- "Everybody Loves a Clown" (song), a song written by Thomas Leslie, Gary Lewis, and Leon Russell and was recorded by Gary Lewis & the Playboys for their 1965 album, Everybody Loves a Clown
- "Everybody Loves a Clown" (Supernatural), episode of Supernatural season 2
- Everybody Loves a Clown (album), a 1965 album by American band Gary Lewis & the Playboys
