= Tower of Strength (Gene McDaniels song) =

Single by Gene McDaniels

from the album Tower of Strength
- B-side: "The Secret"
- Released: September 18, 1961
- Genre: Soul
- Length: 2:14
- Label: Liberty
- Songwriters: Burt Bacharach, Bob Hilliard
- Producer: Snuff Garrett

Gene McDaniels singles chronology
"A Tear" (1961)	"Tower of Strength" (1961)	"Chip Chip" (1961)

"Tower of Strength" is a song written by Burt Bacharach and Bob Hilliard and performed by Gene McDaniels. The record was produced by Snuff Garrett and featured the Johnny Mann Singers and Earl Palmer on drums. It appeared on his 1961 album, Tower of Strength.

== Chart performance ==
The song reached No. 5 on both the US Billboard pop and R&B charts in 1961. It reached No.3 in Australia.

== Other versions ==
- Frankie Vaughan – as a single that peaked at No. 1 on the UK Singles Chart in 1961. It was his second No. 1 single in the UK.
- Paul Raven (later famous as 'Gary Glitter') – as a single in 1961.
- Gloria Lynne released an answer song entitled "You Don't Have to Be a Tower of Strength" in 1961.
- Adriano Celentano sung an Italian version entitled "Stai lontana da me" ("Stay away from me") and won the 1st Cantagiro contest in 1962. He recorded a Spanish version, too, with the title "Torre poderosa".
- Sue Richards had a moderate hit with her recording in 1975.
- Narvel Felts – as a single that went to No. 26 on the Canadian country chart and No. 33 on the country chart in 1979.
