= Harry Whitaker =

American pianist and composer (1942–2010)

Harry Lamah Whitaker
- Born: September 19, 1942; Pensacola, Florida, U.S.
- Died: November 17, 2010 (aged 68) New York City, U.S.
- Occupations: Pianist, composer
- Instrument: Piano
- Years active: 1960s–2010

Harry Lamah Whitaker (September 19, 1942 - November 17, 2010) was an American pianist and composer. He recorded and produced the 1977 album Body, Mind, and Spirit with Black Renaissance, which was called one of the great "holy grails" of the 1970s, while its original unofficial Japanese pressings were said to be near impossible to find.

== Early life ==
Whitaker was born in Pensacola, Florida, on September 19, 1942. He grew up in Detroit and began playing piano at the age of five. His early influences included Barry Harris, Tommy Flanagan, and Hank Jones. He moved to New York City in 1961 and worked as a pianist before joining R&B singer Lloyd Price's band for a long-term engagement from 1965 to 1970.

== Career ==
Whitaker wrote "We Live in Brooklyn, Baby", which was originally recorded on Roy Ayers' 1971 album He's Coming. He was a key member of Roy Ayers Ubiquity, appearing on the group's Ubiquity album and composing and playing electronic keyboards on its first three albums. The song was later sampled by hip-hop artists including Kendrick Lamar and Mos Def.

Whitaker worked with Gene McDaniels on Headless Heroes of the Apocalypse, arranging several songs for the album. Roberta Flack was at the recording session and asked Whitaker to join her group. He declined because of his commitments to Roy Ayers Ubiquity. Four years later, Flack approached him again, and Whitaker joined her group. He served as her musical director for six years and played on albums including Feel Like Makin' Love.

In 1977, a Japanese label issued Whitaker's first album as a leader, Black Renaissance, which was reissued in 2002.

The album Body, Mind, and Spirit was included in The New York Times 2020 list 15 Essential Black Liberation Jazz Tracks.

In the late 1990s and 2000s, Whitaker performed regularly at Arturo's and Smalls Jazz Club, and also played at Fat Cats.

== Death ==
Whitaker died in New York City on November 17, 2010.
