= Act Like Nothing's Wrong =

Studio album by Al Kooper
- Released: 18 November 1976
- Recorded: 1976
- Studio: Record Plant, Los Angeles; Record Plant, Sausalito, California; TK Studios, Hialeah, Florida; Quadraphonic Sound Studios, Nashville, Tennessee; Sound Ideas Studios, New York City; Studio One, Doraville, Georgia
- Genre: Rock
- Length: 38:40
- Label: United Artists
- Producer: Al Kooper, John Simon

Al Kooper chronology
Naked Songs (1973)	Act Like Nothing's Wrong (1976)	Championship Wrestling (1982)

Singles from Act Like Nothing's Wrong
- 1. "This Diamond Ring" Released: October 1976

Professional ratings
Review scores
Source	Rating
AllMusic	2.5/5 stars

Act Like Nothing's Wrong is the seventh solo studio album by the American singer-songwriter Al Kooper, recorded and released in 1976.

== Background ==
After the release of his sixth studio album Naked Songs in 1973, Kooper took time off from solo recording to concentrate on his new discovery, Lynyrd Skynyrd. After producing and playing on their first three albums, he resumed his solo recording career in 1976. The resulting album, Act Like Nothing's Wrong was recorded mostly in Southeastern US studios with a wide array of musicians. The album opens with his own funky version of "This Diamond Ring", a song that he co-wrote for Gary Lewis and the Playboys in 1964. The album continues in the “soul-funk” vein with a mix of covers and original compositions. This was Kooper's first and only album for United Artists. It was six years before he recorded his next album, Championship Wrestling. The front cover shows Al Kooper's head superimposed on the body of the dancer and model Linda Hoxit (his girlfriend at the time), while on the back cover is Linda Hoxit's head on Kooper's body.

== Track listing ==
All tracks composed by Al Kooper; except where indicated

1. "Is We on the Downbeat" – 0:36
2. "This Diamond Ring" (Kooper, Bob Brass, Irwin Levine) – 4:13
3. "She Don't Ever Lose Her Groove" (Willie Hale) – 3:47
4. "I Forgot to Be Your Lover" (Booker T. Jones, William Bell) – 2:58
5. "Missing You" – 3:58
6. "Out of Left Field" (Dan Penn, Spooner Oldham) – 5:10
7. "(Please Not) One More Time" – 3:33
8. "In My Own Sweet Way" – 2:42
9. "Turn My Head Towards Home" (Kooper, John Simon) – 4:35
10. "A Visit to the Rainbow Bar and Grill" – 0:40
11. "Hollywood Vampire" – 6:03

== Personnel ==
- Steve Alaimo – engineer
- Ron Bogdon – bass
- J. R. Cobb – bass
- Gary Coleman – percussion, bongos, conga
- Bob Edwards – engineer
- Gene Eichelberger – engineer
- Robert Ferguson – drums, vocals
- Dominic Frontiere – horn arrangements
- Steve Gibson – guitar, rhythm guitar
- Hilda Harris – backing vocals
- John Henning – engineer
- Bruce Hensal – engineer
- Ron Hicklin Singers – backing vocals
- Linda Hoxit – engineer
- Denis King – engineer
- Al Kooper – guitar, arranger, electric guitar, keyboards, vocals, clavinet, producer, engineer, horn arrangements
- Kelly Kotera – engineer
- Bobby Langford – engineer
- Mike Leech – bass
- Willie "Little Beaver" Hale – guitar
- Larrie Londin – drums
- Harry Lookofsky – violin
- George "Chocolate" Perry – bass
- Alan Robinson – liner notes
- Tim Sadler – engineer
- Rick Sanchez – engineer
- John Simon – arranger, producer
- Rick Smith – engineer
- Steve Smith – engineer
- Marvin Stamm – trumpet, soloist
- Tower of Power – horns
- Wendy Waldman – backing vocals
- Joe Walsh – slide guitar
- Bobby Wood – organ, piano, electric piano
- Reggie Young – guitar, vocals
- Tubby Zeigler – drums
