= Midnight String Quartet =

The Midnight String Quartet were an easy listening chamber music quartet, consisting of two violins, a viola, and a cello, made up of students (at the time) or graduates from the University of Southern California. They played covers and standards over several albums from 1966 to the early seventies, supplemented by a professional rhythm section, often including bass, drums and guitar and sometimes piano and harpsichord.

== History ==
The Midnight String Quartet made a series of instrumental recordings produced by "Tommy 'Snuff' Garrett", on Viva Records (U.S.), a subsidiary of Snuff Garrett Records.

Their First album, Rhapsodies for Young Lovers (1966) was arranged by Leon Russell and spent 59 weeks in the Billboard charts peaking at number 17 in November 1966. More chart success followed in the U.S. with Spanish Rhapsodies for Young Lovers, reaching number 76 in May 1967 and Rhapsodies for Young Lovers, Volume Two, reaching number 67 in July 1967.Christmas Rhapsodies for Young Lovers reached number 18 at Christmas 1967 while Love Rhapsodies only making number 129 in March 1968.The Look of Love and Other Rhapsodies for Young Lovers reached number 194 in August 1968. Midnight String Quartet continued releasing albums with a double album Best of the Midnight String Quartet being released in 1971.

Interest resurfaced during the Lounge Revival of the mid nineties and has seen among others, the re- release on cd of Rhapsodies for Young Lovers on the Varèse Sarabande label with extra tracks and additional liner notes by ‘Elevator music’ and‘The Cocktail’ author Joseph Lanza.

Their version of Mason Williams' Classical Gas was co-charted in Canada with the Williams version. They reached #2.

== Personnel ==
Besides the string quartet itself (The Midnight String Quartet), other players in the rhythm section of their first album Rhapsodies For Young Lovers include:

- Leon Russell- Piano, arrangements & conductor
- Jim W. Gordon- Drums
- Michel Rubini- Harpsichord
- Lyle Workman- Bass.

Midnight Strings Quartet Members:

- Violins: Ron Folsom and Jay Rosen
- Viola: Jerry Epstein
- Cello: Ryan Selberg.

== Discography ==
Original LPs

- Rhapsodies for Young Lovers (1966) Viva Records V-36001 Blue Star (The Medic Theme)/Lara's Theme/Lover's Concerto/Moonlight Sonata/My Heart's Symphony/Shadow Of Your Smile (Love Theme From The Sandpipers)/Strangers In The Night/Tonight's Dream/What Now My Love/Yesterday/You Don't Have To Say You Love Me/Young Lovers' Rhapsody
- Spanish Rhapsodies for Young Lovers (1967) Viva Records V-36004 Cuando Calienta El Sol (Love Me with All Your Heart)/El Relicario/Girl From Ipanema/Guantanamera/La Paloma/Lonely Bull/Maria Elena/Meditation/Our Day Will Come/Quiet Nights Of Quiet Stars/Spanish Eyes/Summer Samba
- Rhapsodies for Young Lovers, Volume 2 (1967) Viva Records V-36008 Alfie/Born Free/Clair De Lune/I Hear A Symphony/My Cup Runneth Over/Portrait Of My Love/Prelude To Love/Prophesy Of Love/Strangers No More/This Is My Song/Til
- Christmas Rhapsodies for Young Lovers (1967) Viva Records V-36010 Have Yourself a Merry Little Christmas/Silent Night/White Christmas/The Little Drummer Boy/Oh, Holy Night/The Christmas Song/Sleigh Ride/It Came Upon a Midnight Clear/Blue Christmas/First Noel/Winter Wonderland/Christmas Rhapsody
- Love Rhapsodies (1968) Viva Records V-36013 Never My Love/Fascination/Can't Take My Eyes Off You/Please Love Me Forever/Softly/Tara's Theme//Goin' Out of My Head/The Look Of Her/Misty Night/Impossible Dream/Twilight Sonata/My Prayer
- The Look of Love and Other Rhapsodies for Young Lovers (1968) Viva Records V-36015 Apologize/By The Time I Get To Phoenix/Classical Gas/Good, Bad And The Ugly/Kiss Me Goodbye/Love Is Blue/Love Sonata/MacArthur Park/Midnight Memories/The Look Of Love/Theme From Valley Of The Dolls/Young Girl
- Goodnight My Love and Other Rhapsodies for Young Lovers (1969) Viva Records V-36019 Goodnight My Love/For Once/I Say a Little Prayer/Love Is a Many-Splendored Thing/My Special Angel/I Love How You Love Me/I'm Gonna Make You Love Me/Two Different Worlds/Love Poem/Those Were the Days/Lavender Love/No Not Much
- Rhapsodies for Young Lovers, Volume Three (1971) Viva Records V-36022 Jean/You've Lost That Lovin' Feelin'/Love Theme from "Romeo and Juliet"/Windmills of Your Mind/Starlight Memories/Yesterday, When I Was Young/Man and a Woman/Nocturne/And That Reminds Me/Everybody's Talkin'/There's a Place for Lovers/Good Morning Starshine
- Chamber Music for Lovers (1971) Viva Records V-36024 Song of Joy/Come Saturday Morning/Dales/Scarborough Fair/Leaving On a Jet Plane/Carolina on My Mind/Bridge Over Troubled Water/Hills/Words/The Long & Winding Road
- Best of the Midnight String Quartet: Unforgettable Love Songs (1971) Viva Records BS-2571 [Two record set] Never My Love/Strangers in the Night/Look of Love/Love Is Blue/You Don't Have to Say You Love Me/Till/MacArthur Park/Yesterday/Lara's Theme From Doctor Zhivago/What Now, My Love?/Man and a Woman/Michelle/The Shadow of Your Smile/Can't Take My Eyes Off You/Windmills of Your Mind/My Special Angel/Love Theme from "Romeo and Juliet"/Goin' Out of My Head/Tara's Theme/Goodnight My Love

CD reissues

- Rhapsodies for Young Lovers (2007) Varèse Sarabande 066852

== See also ==
- Easy listening
- Elevator music
- Lounge music
