= This Diamond Ring (album) =

Studio album by Gary Lewis & the Playboys
- Released: March 1965
- Recorded: 1964–1965
- Genre: Rock; pop; rock and roll
- Length: 26:51
- Label: Liberty Records
- Producer: Snuff Garrett

Gary Lewis & the Playboys chronology
This Diamond Ring (1965)	A Session with Gary Lewis and the Playboys (1965)

Singles from This Diamond Ring
- 1. "This Diamond Ring" Released: December 3, 1964

Professional ratings
Review scores
Source	Rating
Allmusic	2/5 stars

This Diamond Ring is the debut studio album by American band Gary Lewis & the Playboys, and was released in 1965 on Liberty Records, LRP-3408. It is the first of three charting albums released by the band in 1965.

== Background ==
The group was formed in 1964 and was originally known as Gary & the Playboys. Producer Snuff Garrett saw them performing at Disneyland and he brought them into the studio to record the single "This Diamond Ring". He also had the band change their name to Gary Lewis & the Playboys to capitalize on Gary's famous father, comedian/actor Jerry Lewis. The success of the single led them to record a whole album of mostly covers of popular songs by the Kinks, Bobby Rydell, the Coasters, and others. The album was the second-highest-charting original album of their career. The single "This Diamond Ring" launched a string of seven Top 10 hits for the group.

The album marked the beginning of long, successful careers for musicians Al Kooper and Leon Russell.

== Dispute regarding musicians on the album ==
Over the years, there has been much discussion regarding the roles of various musicians used on the album sessions. Garrett used The Wrecking Crew as session players on the whole album. Lewis has stated in interviews:

"So we went into the studio, we cut the basic track. The only other person from the Wrecking Crew that we had in there while we were doing the basic track was Hal Blaine, and he played the Tympanis on 'Diamond Ring'".

Producer Garrett remembers it differently, stating:

"I didn't use The Playboys at all except as overtones."

There is also a question regarding whether Carol Kaye contributed bass on some tracks.

== Track listing ==
1. "This Diamond Ring" (Al Kooper, Bob Brass, Irwin Levine) – 2:15 (Kooper's name is misspelled as “Kooder” on the original vinyl labels)
2. "Dream Lover" (Bobby Darin) – 2:23
3. "All Day and All of the Night" (Ray Davies) – 1:52
4. "Forget Him" (Mark Anthony) – 2:10
5. "Needles and Pins" (Jack Nitzsche, Sonny Bono) – 2:00
6. "Love Potion Number 9" (Jerry Leiber, Mike Stoller) – 1:51
7. "Keep Searchin'" (Del Shannon) – 1:54
8. "The Birds and the Bees" (Barry Stuart) – 2:01
9. "Sweet Little Rock And Roller" (Chuck Berry) – 2:17
10. "Go To Him" (Sonny Curtis, Tom Lesslie) – 2:00
11. "The Night Has A Thousand Eyes" (Ben Weisman, Dottie Wayne, Marilyn Garrett) – 3:02
12. "The Best Man" (Cliff Crofford) – 2:21

== Personnel ==
=== Gary Lewis and the Playboys ===
- Gary Lewis – vocals, drums
- Dave Walker – rhythm guitar, vocals
- Dave Costell – lead guitar
- Al Ramsay – bass
- John R. West – electric cordovox

These were the Playboys at the time of the recording, although many session musicians were also used.

=== Additional musicians ===
- Ron Hicklin – vocals

==== The Wrecking Crew ====
- Leon Russell – keyboards, arrangements
- Hal Blaine – drums
- Tommy Allsup – guitar
- Mike Deasy – guitar
- Joe Osborn – bass

=== Technical ===
- Snuff Garrett – music producer, liner notes
- "Bones" Howe – engineer
- H. Bowen David, Henry Lewy – assistant engineers
- Sam Jacobson – cover design
- Bud Fraker – photography

== Charts ==
Chart (1965)	Peak position
Billboard 200	26

=== Singles ===
Year	Single	Billboard Hot 100
1965	"This Diamond Ring"	1
