= Don't Call It Love =

Don't Call It Love may refer to:

== Songs ==
- "Don't Call It Love" (song), by Kim Carnes, 1981; covered by Dolly Parton (1985) and others
- "Don't Call It Love", by Eliza Doolittle from In Your Hands, 2013
- "Don't Call It Love", by Girlschool from Wildlife, 1982
- "Don't Call It Love", by Johnny Hartman from I Just Dropped by to Say Hello, 1964
- "Don't Call It Love", by Jonas Blue from Jonas Blue: Electronic Nature – The Mix 2017, 2017
- "Don't Call It Love", by Paul Williams from Ordinary Fool, 1975
- "Don't Call It Love", by Quiet Riot from Hollywood Cowboys, 2019
- "Don't Call It Love", unreleased demo by Steve Kipner, 1983
- "Don't Call It Love", by Zero 7, 2013

== Other uses ==
- Don't Call It Love (film), a 1923 American silent film
- Don't Call It Love, a 1984 romance novel by Lindsay Armstrong
- Don't Call It Love, a 1992 book by Patrick Carnes
