= Everybody Loves a Clown (album) =

Studio album by Gary Lewis & the Playboys
- Released: November 1965
- Recorded: 1965
- Genre: Rock; pop; rock and roll
- Length: 28:41
- Label: Liberty Records
- Producer: Snuff Garrett

Gary Lewis & the Playboys chronology
A Session with Gary Lewis and the Playboys (1965)	Everybody Loves a Clown (1965)	She's Just My Style (1966)

Singles from Everybody Loves a Clown
- 1. "Everybody Loves a Clown" Released: August 20, 1965

Professional ratings
Review scores
Source	Rating
Allmusic	2.5/5 stars

Everybody Loves a Clown is the third studio album by American band Gary Lewis & the Playboys, and was released in 1965 on Liberty Records, LRP-3428. It is the third of three charting albums released by the band in 1965, and it was the band's third-highest-charting original album, reaching number 44 on the Billboard 200. The single "Everybody Loves a Clown" was the band's fourth single in a row to chart on the Billboard Hot 100, reaching number 4 in November 1965.

== Background ==
Riding on their string of successful singles, Lewis and producer Snuff Garrett went back into the studio to record the band's third album. The single from the album "Everybody Loves a Clown" was released in August, the same month as their previous album A Session with Gary Lewis and the Playboys. The new album was released three months later in November 1965. The album followed their usual formula of a couple of original compositions along with covers of recent hits by artists such as the Fleetwoods, Manfred Mann, Everly Brothers and Johnny Burnette. Their single from their next album, "She's Just My Style", was released in the same month as this album.

== Track listing ==
1. "Everybody Loves a Clown" (Gary Lewis, Leon Russell, Tom Lesslie) – 2:26
2. "Mr. Blue" (Dewayne Blackwell) – 2:29
3. "Chip Chip" (Jeff Barry, Clifford Crawford, Arthur Resnick) – 2:11
4. "I Gotta Find Cupid" (Tommy Boyce, Bobby Hart, Russell, Lesslie) – 2:48
5. "Let Me Tell Your Fortune" (Cliff Crofford) – 2:12
6. "(Till) I Kissed You" (Don Everly) – 2:19
7. "Tossin' and Turnin'" (Ritchie Adams, Malou Rene) – 2:41
8. "My Special Angel" (Jimmy Duncan) – 2:20
9. "We'll Work It Out" (Gary Geld, Peter Udell) – 2:06
10. "Sha La La" (Robert Mosley, Robert Napoleon Taylor) – 2:41
11. "Time Stands Still" (Lewis, Russell, Lesslie) – 2:04
12. "Dreamin'" (Barry Devorzon, Ted Ellis) – 2:25

== Personnel ==
Gary Lewis and the Playboys

- Gary Lewis – vocals, drums on tracks 7 and 11
- Tommy Tripplehorn – lead guitar except on track 1
- Carl Radle – bass, vocals
- John R. West – electric cordovox
- David H. Costell – lead guitar on track 1
- Dave Walker – rhythm guitar on tracks 1, 7, 11

Additional musicians

- Jim Keltner – drums except on tracks 1, 7, 11
- Hal Blaine – drums on track 1
- Leon Russell – keyboards

Technical

- Snuff Garrett – music producer
- Leon Russell – arranger
- Woody Woodward – design
- Jerry Lewis, Patti Palmer – liner notes

== Charts ==
Chart (1965)	Peak position
US Billboard Top LPs	44

=== Singles ===
Year	Single	US Billboard Hot 100
1965	"Everybody Loves a Clown"	4
