= Headless Heroes of the Apocalypse =

Studio album by Eugene McDaniels
- Released: 1971
- Recorded: 1971
- Studios: Atlantic; Regent Sound (New York City)
- Genres: Jazz-funk; psychedelic funk
- Length: 37:50
- Labels: Label M Atlantic; Water
- Producer: Joel Dorn

Eugene McDaniels chronology
Outlaw (1970)	Headless Heroes of the Apocalypse (1971)	Natural Juices (1975)

Headless Heroes of the Apocalypse is an album by the American musician Eugene McDaniels, released in 1971. Spiro Agnew allegedly asked Atlantic Records to withdraw it from stores. It was issued on compact disc in 2001.

== Overview ==
The album is dedicated to Roberta Flack: "Special thanks to Miss Roberta Flack for not being afraid to help a brother. She, in my opinion, is a lady of quality, grace, humanity and talent of the highest order. I love you, Bert-G."

Several of the songs have been sampled by hip hop producers, including Pete Rock, Q-Tip, and Beastie Boys. The vinyl album became an expensive collector's item.

== Critical reception ==
Professional ratings
Review scores
Source	Rating
AllMusic	4/5 stars
Pitchfork	8.7/10

The Hawaii Tribune-Herald noted that "the backups are crisp and informal, while the female vocal matches [McDaniels] beautifully."

The Boston Phoenix wrote that the album "occupies a funky fringe backwater where soul, rock, R&B, and the protest song aligned with identity politics, theology, astrology, urban affairs, hallucinogenic drugs, and black revolution."

== Track listing ==
All tracks composed by Eugene McDaniels; except where noted.

1. "The Lord Is Back" (McDaniels, Dwight Singleton) - 3:19
2. "Jagger the Dagger" – 6:02
3. "Lovin' Man" – 4:47
4. "Headless Heroes" – 3:32
5. "Susan Jane" – 2:10
6. "Freedom Death Dance" – 4:16
7. "Supermarket Blues" – 4:08
8. "The Parasite (For Buffy)" – 9:36

== Personnel ==
- Harry Whitaker – piano, musical director
- Gary King – electric bass
- Miroslav Vitouš – acoustic bass
- Alphonse Mouzon – drums
- Richard Resnicoff – guitar
- Carla Cargill – female vocals

Technical

- Lew Hahn – recording and remixing engineer
- Patrick Roques – art direction and design
- Bill Del Conte – photography
- Harvey Konigsberg – samurai painting
