= Norwegian Official Report =

Report published by a panel or committee appointed by the Norwegian government

A Norwegian Official Report (Norwegian: Norges offentlige utredninger, NOU) is a report published by a panel or committee appointed by the Norwegian government. The Norwegian Parliament may request the government to establish, such a committee.

The first NOU was commissioned in 1972, and over 1600 reports have been published since.

== See also ==
- Public inquiry
- Royal Commission
- White paper
- Statens offentliga utredningar
