= Naked Songs (Al Kooper album) =

Studio album by Al Kooper
- Released: January 1973
- Recorded: 1972
- Studio: Record Plant, New York; Studio One, Doraville, Georgia
- Genre: Rock
- Length: 37:04
- Label: Columbia
- Producer: Al Kooper

Al Kooper chronology
A Possible Projection of the Future / Childhood's End (1972)	Naked Songs (1973)	Act Like Nothing's Wrong (1977)

Singles from Naked Songs
- 1. "Sam Stone" Released: September 6, 1972; 2. "Jolie" Released: November 1972

Professional ratings
Review scores
Source	Rating
AllMusic	4/5 stars

Naked Songs is the sixth album by American singer-songwriter Al Kooper for Columbia Records, released in 1973. Two singles were released in the fall of 1972, preceding the album.

== Background ==
A contract-fulfilling release, coming months after Kooper had set up the Sounds of the South label through MCA Records, it was quickly recorded at New York City's Record Plant (the first time Kooper had recorded in New York since 1970's Easy Does It) and at Studio One in Doraville, Georgia (where the following year Kooper would produce Lynyrd Skynyrd's smash hit "Sweet Home Alabama").

Mixing a heavier dose of gospel into the mix as well as the Arp synthesizer, Kooper effortlessly blended soul, rhythm and blues, rock, country and pop music much as he had on all of his Columbia albums. He continued with his successful formula of original material and select covers.

After this album, Kooper spent three years working with and producing Lynyrd Skynyrd, before resuming his solo career with his next recording, Act Like Nothing's Wrong in late 1976.

== Track listing ==
All tracks composed by Al Kooper; except where indicated

1. "(Be Yourself) Be Real" – 3:25
2. "As the Years Go Passing By" (Don Robey) – 6:04
3. "Jolie" – 3:46
4. "Blind Baby" – 3:06
5. "Been and Gone" (Annette Peacock) – 2:35
6. "Sam Stone" (John Prine) – 4:43
7. "Peacock Lady" – 3:23
8. "Touch the Hem of His Garment" (Sam Cooke) – 4:04
9. "Where Were You When I Needed You" (Irwin Levine, Kooper) – 3:14
10. "Unrequited" – 2:44

== Personnel ==
=== Musicians ===
- Al Kooper – piano, organ, guitars, ARP synthesizer, harpsichord, electric bass

With

- John Paul Fetta – electric bass (tracks 1–2, 4–5, 9)
- Junior Hanley – drums (tracks 1–2, 4–5, 9)
- Charlie Brown – guitar (tracks 2, 4)
- Paul Goddard – bass (tracks 3, 6)
- Barry Bailey – guitar (tracks 3, 6)
- J. R. Cobb – guitar (tracks 3, 6)
- Robert Nix – drums (tracks 3, 6)
- Richard Greene – fiddle (track 4)
- Dean Daughtry – piano (track 6)
- Stuart Scharf – guitar (track 7)
- Maruga Booker – percussion (track 7)
- Linda November, Maeretha Stewart, Tasha Thomas, Eileen Gilbert, Patti Austin, Albertine Robinson, Michael Gately, Robert John – backing vocals
- Jimmy Wisner – string arrangements (tracks 7, 9, 10)

=== Technical ===
- Al Kooper – producer
- Al Kooper, Charlie Bradley, Don Puluse, Doug Pomeroy, Jerry Watson, Rodney Mills, Wayne Tarnowski – engineers
- Fred Lombardi – photography
- Teresa Alferi – cover design
