= Viva Records (U.S.) =

- Parent company: Dot Records
- Founded: 1965/1966
- Founder: Snuff Garrett (circa 1966) Restart; Snuff Garrett; Clint Eastwood (circa 1980)
- Genre: Various
- Country of origin: United States

Viva Records was an American record label that was later co-owned by Snuff Garrett and Clint Eastwood. It started in 1966 as a subsidiary of Snuff Garrett Records. The records were distributed by Dot Records until 1971. From 1971 until 1983 they were distributed by Warner Bros. Records.

== Background ==
According to Snuff Garrett, the owner of Dot Records, Randy Wood gave him $250,000 to start a record label. Coming back from New York to LA, he told Leon Russell that he wanted him to arrange songs for a string quartet. Russell looked at him as if he had lost his mind. Garrett invented a name for the ensemble, which was The Midnight String Quartet, and the album Rhapsodies for Young Lovers sold 300,000 copies.

In the late 1960s, Viva Records and Bravo Records had a team of writing staff that included Jerry Fuller, Jimmy Griffin and Mike Gordon, Jimmy Duncan, Sonny Curtis, Mark Charron, Christopher Quinn, Michael Lawrence and Paul Byrne.

The label would eventually be sold to Warner Brothers. Garret would make them give him the label back and he restarted it with Clint Eastwood in the early 1980s.

== History ==
It was reported in the 11 June 1966 issue of Cash Box that successful independent record producer Snuff Garrett had formed his own record label, Viva Records. Dot Records was to handle all of the national distribution tasks. At the time, the staff consisted of Snuff Garrett as president, Leon Russell as executive vice-president of A&R and product, and Ed Silvers as vice president in charge of sales and promotion. In addition to handling the administrative side of the label, Silvers would be working out of the headquarters at 1800 Argyle in Hollywood. In spite of being a completely separate company from Dot Records, Viva Records had access to all of Dot's promotional and sales facilities.

Sonny Curtis recorded "My Way of Life" and "Last Call" which was released on Viva 602 in 1966. The single debuted at No. 58 in the Record World Top Country Singles chart for the week of 3 September 1966.

In January 1967, The Second Helping released their John MacQuarrie-produced single, "Floating Downstream on an Inflatable Rubber Raft" bw "On Friday" on Viva 605. The single was Top 60 Spotlight in the 14 January issue of Billboard. According to the reviewer, it was one to watch and it could establish the group.

By early 1967, Viva Records and Muntz Stereo-Pak had entered into an agreement for approximately one year to have the Viva Records product issued on the Stereo-Pak format. Both Earl W. Muntz the president of Muntz, and Ed Silvers, the vice president of Viva Records facilitated the agreement.

It was reported in the 6 May 1967 issue of Record World that Professor Irwin Corey had been signed to the label. The album The World's Foremost Authority? which was produced by Chuck Blore, was to be released soon.

Snuff Garrett appeared on the front cover of the 5 August 1967 issue of Cash Box. This marked the diversification of Dot Records, with Garrett's Viva Records now being part of the Dot / Acta Records family. Viva Records was also doing very well with their act, the Midnight String Quartet who were having success with "Rhapsodies for Young Lovers".

By late 1968, Viva Records along with its sister label Bravo, had developed a concept line of material that provided a steady flow of catalogue-type sales. Ready for release in the new year was Lonely Harpsichord Memories of That Rainy Night by Jonathan Knight, his third for the label, and an album by the Midnight String Quartet, which was their seventh.

It was reported in the 28 November 1970 issue of Record World that Viva Records which had previously been known as a middle-of-the-road label, was now also a contemporary label. And they had already managed to have a contemporary record in the Top 40 with "Games" by the group Redeye.

=== Later years ===
According to Billboard, Viva Records were hosting a celebration event in Los Angeles to celebrate their second anniversary. This was in conjunction with Clint Eastwoods's Malpaso Productions and Warner Brothers on 30 November 1982.

It was reported in the 25 March 1983 issue of Radio & Records that Viva Records owners Clint Eastwood and Snuff Garrett had announced that Ray Price had been signed to their label. Price's new single, "Willie, Write Me a Song" was scheduled for release on the 30th of that month. It was reported in the 7 May 1983 issue of Billboard that Don Blocker, the president of Viva Records wanted to let everyone know that Viva's new release by Ray Price was its first since they had changed their logo from Warner/Viva to Viva. Having taken Warner off of their label, it was now just Viva Records. Price's single also debuted at No. 87 on the Billboard Hot Country Singles chart that week. It peaked at No. 72 for the week of 21 May.

== See also ==
- List of record labels
