= My Heart's Symphony =

Single by Gary Lewis & the Playboys

from the album (You Don't Have To) Paint Me a Picture
- B-side: "Tina (I Held You in My Arms)"
- Released: July 1966
- Genre: Pop rock
- Length: 2:29
- Label: Liberty 55898
- Songwriter: Glen Hardin
- Producer: Snuff Garrett

Gary Lewis & the Playboys singles chronology
"Green Grass" (1966)	"My Heart's Symphony" (1966)	"(You Don't Have To) Paint Me a Picture" (1966)

"My Heart's Symphony" is a 1966 song written by Glen Hardin and performed by Gary Lewis & the Playboys, and featured on their 1966 album, (You Don't Have To) Paint Me a Picture. The song was produced by Snuff Garrett and Leon Russell and arranged by Russell and Hardin.

== Chart performance ==
In the US, "My Heart's Symphony" reached #13 on the Billboard Hot 100, ending the group's seven-top 10 hit streak. Outside the US, it went to #31 in Canada, #36 in the United Kingdom, and #98 in Australia.

== Other versions ==
- The Midnight String Quartet released a version of the song on their 1966 album, Rhapsodies for Young Lovers.
- The Four Lads released a version of the song in 1969 that reached #38 on the U.S. adult contemporary chart.
