= Carnival of Sound =

Studio album by Jan and Dean
- Released: November 19, 2009
- Recorded: March 31, 1966 – September 17, 1968
- Studios: Columbia; Wally Heider; United; Western; Gold Star (Los Angeles)
- Genre: Psychedelia
- Length: 79:20 (CD version)
- Label: Rhino Handmade
- Producers: Jan Berry (original); Andrew Sandoval (compilation)

Jan and Dean chronology
Live in Concert: Surf City (2001)	Carnival of Sound (2009)	Filet Of Soul Redux: The Rejected Master Recordings (2017)

Carnival of Sound is the last studio album by the American rock duo Jan and Dean. Though recorded sporadically from 1966 to 1968, it was not released until 2009. (Note: The album was first issued on November 19, 2009, on a limited-edition vinyl record. A wider CD release followed on February 22, 2010.) Even though it is credited as a Jan and Dean record, it is actually more of a Jan Berry solo effort. Berry died in 2004. The album consists mostly of original material, with a few covers of songs by artists such as The Five Satins and The Coasters. The album is notable for having a more psychedelic sound than other Jan and Dean records.

== Background ==
Sessions for a new Jan and Dean album began in March 1966, with a few tracks completed before Berry's debilitating car accident the following month. Sessions continued sporadically until December 1968 as Berry slowly recovered. The project was also significantly over budget. The album was deemed complete in 1969 but was never released, while collectors circulated unofficial bootleg versions. The album's disappearance prevented a possible psychedelic comeback for Jan and Dean, and their working relationship as a duo soon ended.

Rhino Handmade Records released the first official version of the album as a limited-edition mono vinyl record on November 19, 2009, followed by a wider release on compact disc on February 22, 2010. Included were tracks intended for the original album in 1968 plus 15 bonus tracks from the same sessions. Producer Andrew Sandoval contributed extensive liner notes. AllMusic compared the album to Brian Wilson's Smile, calling it "just as tantalizing a 'lost' artifact of the psychedelic '60s" and that Jan Berry had become "far more self-consciously ambitious" than on previous Jan and Dean records.

While presented as a Jan and Dean album, Jan Berry (even though he wrote and produced the material) only played and sang on a few songs due to complications from his car accident. Dean Torrence, who by that time had become disillusioned with the duo's prospects, only appears on one song. Glen Campbell made some contributions to the sessions, and singer Tom Bahler performed lead vocals on several songs.

== Track listing ==
=== Original release ===
1. "Girl, You're Blowing My Mind" (Jan Berry, Steve Gaines, Paul Freese)
2. "Mulholland" (Berry, Roger Christian)
3. "Fan Tan" (Berry, Jill Gibson, Don Altfeld)
4. "Carnival of Sound" (Berry, Christian, David Weiss)
5. "Laurel and Hardy" (Berry, Christian)
6. "I Know My Mind" (Berry, Christian)
7. "Love and Hate" (Berry, Gibson, Jan Hirsch)
8. "Tijuana" (Berry, Christian, Altfeld)
9. "Hawaii" (Berry, Gibson)
10. "Louisiana Man" (Doug Kershaw)
11. "Stay" (Maurice Williams)
12. "Only a Boy" (Berry, Altfeld, Fred Wieder)
13. "In the Still of the Night" (Fred Parris)
14. "Yakety Yak" (Jerry Leiber, Mike Stoller)

=== Additional tracks ===
1. "Don't Drop It" — (Backing Track) (Unknown)
2. "Girl, You're Blowing My Mind" — (Stereo Mix) (Jan Berry, Steve Gaines, Paul Freese)
3. "Mulholland" — (Stereo Mix) (Jan Berry, Roger Christian)
4. "Fan Tan" — (Stereo Mix) (Jan Berry, Jill Gibson, Don Altfeld)
5. "Carnival of Sound" — (Stereo Mix) (Jan Berry, Roger Christian, David Weiss)
6. "I Know My Mind" — (Stereo Mix) (Jan Berry, Roger Christian)
7. "Love and Hate" — (Stereo Mix) (Jan Berry, Jill Gibson, Jan Hirsch)
8. "Tijuana" — (Stereo Mix) (Jan Berry, Don Altfeld, Roger Christian)
9. "Hawaii" — (Stereo Mix) (Jan Berry, Jill Gibson)
10. "Louisiana Man" — (Stereo Mix) (Doug Kershaw)
11. "Stay" — (Stereo Mix) (Maurice Williams)
12. "In the Still of the Night" — (Stereo Mix) (Fred Parris)
13. "Girl, You're Blowing My Mind" — (Jan's Final Mix) (Jan Berry, Steve Gaines, Paul Freese)
14. "Laurel and Hardy" — (Jan's Demo) (Jan Berry, Roger Christian)
15. "Girl, You're Blowing My Mind" — (Alternate Backing Track) (Jan Berry, Steve Gaines, Paul Freese)

== Personnel ==
- Guitar: Glen Campbell, Al Casey, David Bennett Cohen, Mike Deasy, Don Peake, Bill Pitman, Tommy Tedesco. Sitar: Mike Deasy
- Bass: Jimmy Bond, Joe Osborn, Ray Pohlman, Lyle Ritz
- Keyboards: Glen Hardin, Larry Knechtel, Don Randi
- Drums: Hal Blaine, Earl Palmer
- Brass/Woodwind: John Cave, Roy Caton, Virgil Evans, Don Lodice, Ronnie Ossa,
- Strings: Israel Baker, Arnold Belnick, Samuel Boghossian, Joseph Difiore, Joseph Ditullio, Jesse Erlich, James Getzoff, Philip Goldberg, Igor Horoshevsky, Harry Hyams, Jan Kelly, William Kurasch, Leonard Malarsky, Emmett Sargeant, Joseph Saxon, Ralph Schaeffer, Leonard Selic, Sid Sharp, Darrel Terwilliger, Tibor Zelig
- Vocals: John Bahler, Tom Bahler, B. J. Baker, Jan Berry, Glen Campbell, Stan Farber, Ian Freebairn-Smith, Jerry Fuller, Jill Gibson, Mitch Gordon, Ron Hicklin, Gwen Johnson, Davy Jones, Tony Minichiello, Bob Tebow, Dean Torrence, Bob Zwirn

== Sources ==
- Sandoval, Andrew (2010). Carnival of Sound (Liner notes). Jan and Dean. Rhino Handmade, Warner Bros. Records. RHM2 521476.
