= Chip Chip =

Single by Gene McDaniels
- B-side: "Another Tear Falls"
- Released: December 29, 1961
- Genre: Soul
- Length: 2:13
- Label: Liberty
- Songwriter(s): Jeff Barry, Cliff Crofford, Arthur Resnick
- Producer(s): Snuff Garrett

Gene McDaniels singles chronology
"Tower of Strength" (1961)	"Chip Chip" (1961)	"Funny" (1962)

"Chip Chip" is a song written by Jeff Barry, Cliff Crofford, and Arthur Resnick and performed by Gene McDaniels. The song was produced by Snuff Garrett and featured Earl Palmer on drums.

== Chart performance ==
The song reached No. 10 on the Billboard Hot 100 chart in 1962. Outside the US, the song reached No. 2 in Australia.
