= Linda Hoxit =

American dancer and model

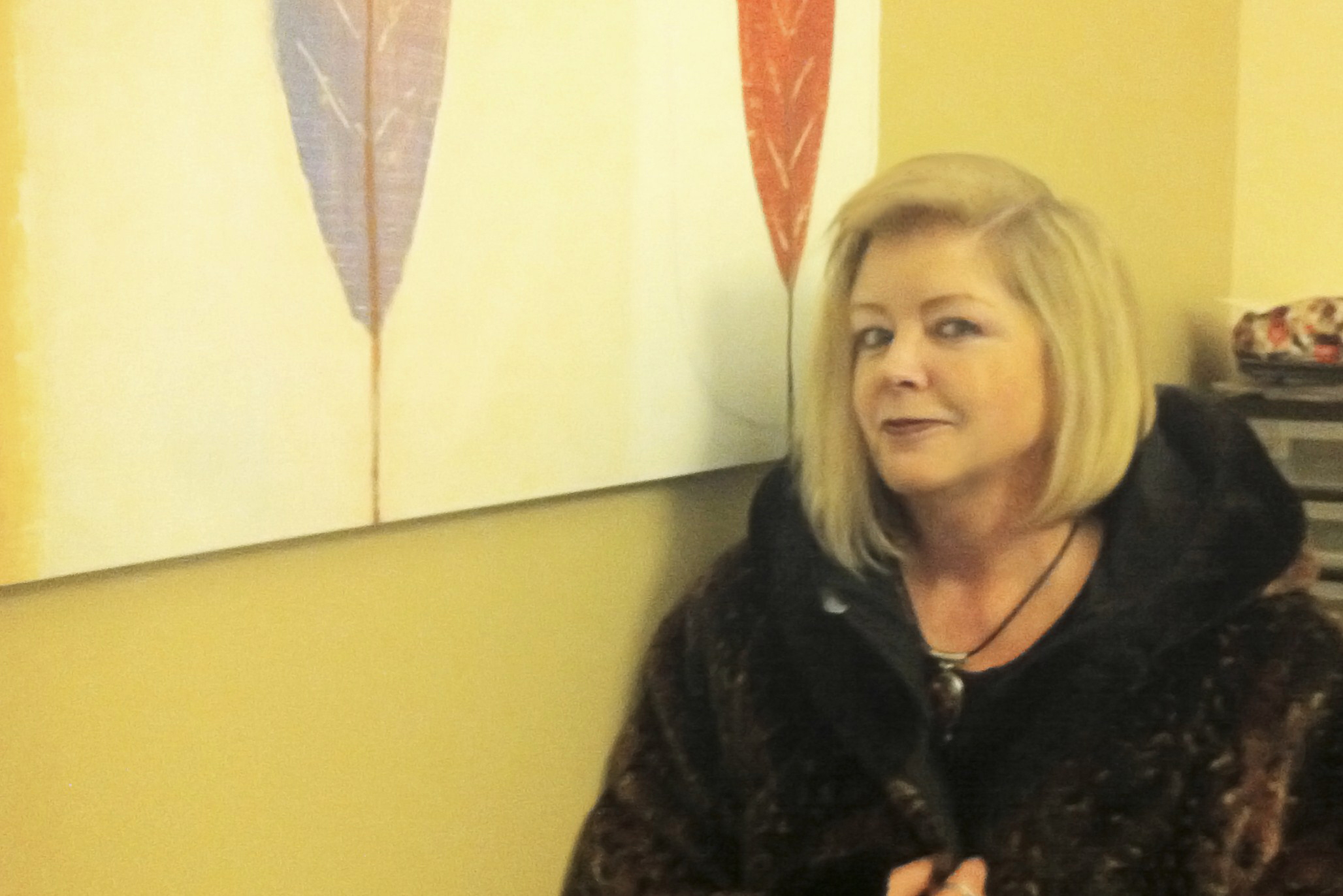
- Born: Bremerton, Washington, U.S.
- Other name: Linda Hoxit-Smith
- Occupations: Dancer, actor, singer, model
- Years active: 1973–1983
- Spouse(s): Richard E. Smith (m. 1990; died 2011) Alan Almeida (m. 2013)

Linda Hoxit is a former dancer, model, singer and actress who appeared in television and film during the 1970s and 1980s.

== Career ==
Hoxit is a native of Bremerton, Washington, and appeared as dancer on dozens of 1970s variety shows including The Smothers Brothers Show, The Sonny and Cher Show, Tony Orlando and Dawn, The Brady Bunch Hour, (performing water ballet as one of The Krofftettes) and The Carol Burnett Show.

A member of Actors’ Equity, she has appeared in over thirty musicals, including the bride role of Sarah Kines in the national tour and Broadway run of Seven Brides for Seven Brothers at the Alvin Theater in New York City. Hoxit was one of Ray Anthony’s "Bookends" dancers. Her film credits include Grease, History of the World, Part I (again as a synchronized swimmer), and Movie Movie.

Hoxit is the former girlfriend of rockstar Al Kooper and was featured on the cover of his album "Act Like Nothing's Wrong" with his head superimposed on her body.

== Personal life ==
After 12 years based in Los Angeles, Linda returned home to the Seattle area where she taught dance and acting for many years. She was an acting coach at the John Robert Powers School in Seattle. After twenty years of marriage to Richard E. Smith, she was widowed in January 2011. Linda continued to stay in touch with many of her dance colleagues. She was married to Alan Almeida, Operations Manager of The Sacramento Theatre Company, and now makes her home in Sacramento, California, where she began her professional career in the early 1970's at Sacramento Light Opera Association's, "Music Circus". In 2025 Linda became a published author with her memoir, "Rockstars, Showbiz, The Playboy Mansion and Broadway, My Best Life Yet."

== See also ==
- The Krofftettes
- The Brady Bunch Hour
