= (You Don't Have To) Paint Me a Picture =

Single by Gary Lewis & the Playboys

from the album (You Don't Have To) Paint Me a Picture
- B-side: "Looking for the Stars"
- Released: September 1966
- Genre: Pop rock
- Length: 2:10
- Label: Liberty
- Songwriter(s): Roger Tillison, Leon Russell, Snuff Garrett
- Producer(s): Snuff Garrett

Gary Lewis & the Playboys singles chronology
"My Heart's Symphony" (1966)	"(You Don't Have To) Paint Me a Picture" (1966)	"Where Will the Words Come From" (1966)

"(You Don't Have To) Paint Me a Picture" is a song written by Roger Tillison, Leon Russell, and Snuff Garrett and performed by Gary Lewis & the Playboys. It reached #9 in Canada, #15 on the Billboard Hot 100, and #58 in Australia in 1966. It was featured on their 1966 album, (You Don't Have To) Paint Me a Picture.

The song was produced by Snuff Garrett and arranged by Leon Russell.
