= Tommy Möller =

Swedish political scientist

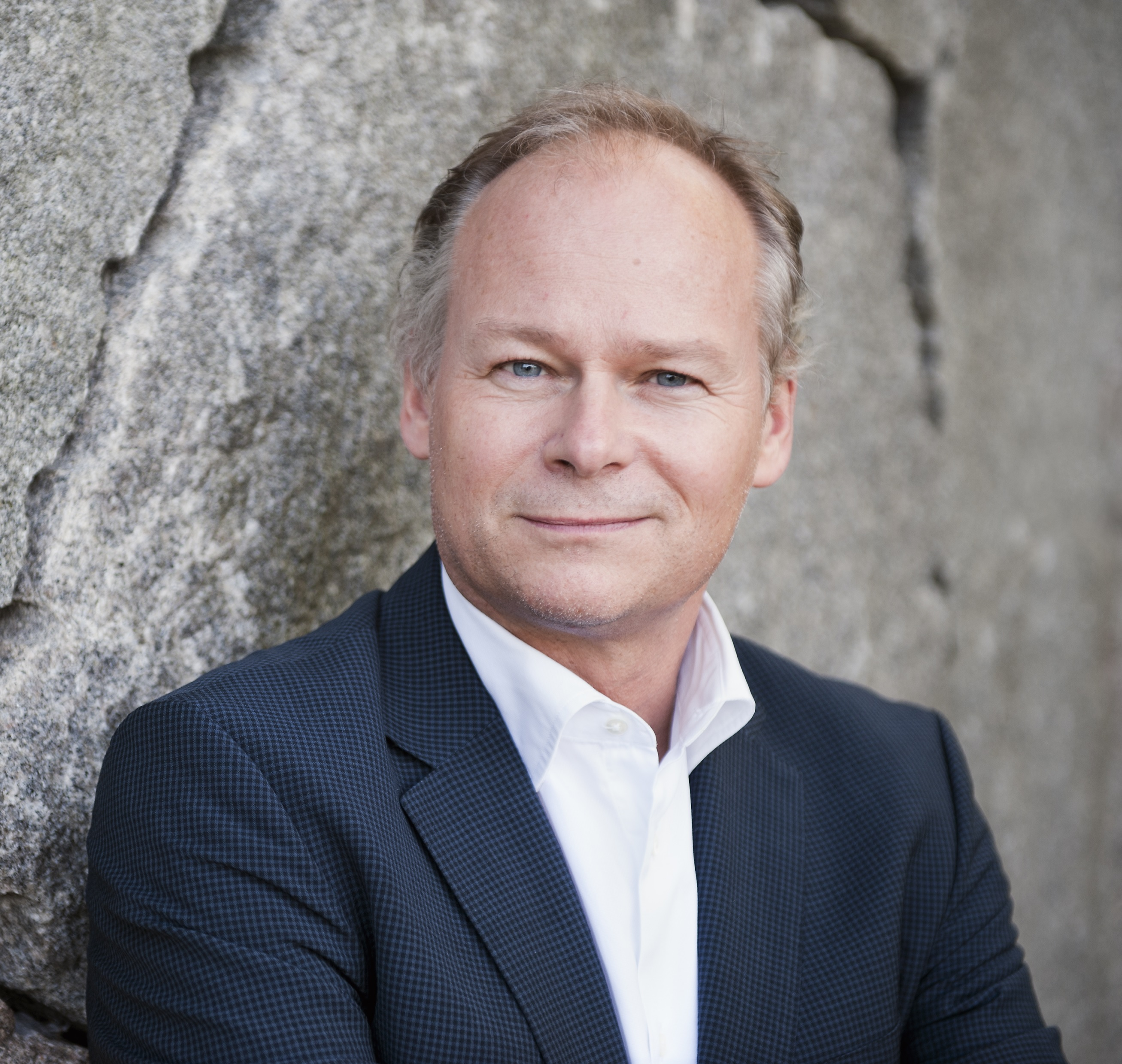
Möller in 2011

Tommy Möller (born 1958) is a Swedish professor of Political science at Stockholm University, and a frequent conservative political commentator in the Swedish media.

Möller received his PhD from Uppsala University in 1986. Tommy Möller has been recognized for his work on Swedish elections and political parties.

== As political commentator ==
Möller has acted as political commentator in most all of the Swedish media, including Dagens Nyheter, Svenska Dagbladet, Aftonbladet, Expressen, Dagens Eko and Rapport. On Election Night, 2006, Möller provided political commentary for the national radio broadcaster Sveriges Radio as the votes were tallied. Möller has also written op-eds for the daily newspaper Dagens Nyheter. During the controversy after the 2004 tsunami, Thomas Möller supported king Carl XVI Gustafs with op-eds in Dagens Nyheter and Expressen.

== Other ==
At Almedalen Week 2009, Möller chaired a seminar on political lobbying in Sweden, and participated in another seminar where he discussed the role of politicians in a political system using preferential voting.

== Publications (selection) ==
This list is limited to books. A more complete list of publications is available at Möller's department homepage

- Borgerlig samverkan. Uppsala: Diskurs Förlag, 1986. (Dissertation, Uppsala University) ISBN 91-86732-01-3
- Partier och organisationer, Mats Bäck and Tommy Möller, 1st edition, Stockholm: Allmänna förlaget, 1990. ISBN 91-38-90534-5. Several more editions (6th edition, Stockholm: Norstedts Juridik, 2003)
- Brukare och klienter i välfärdsstaten: Om missnöje och påverkan inom barn- och äldreomsorg. Stockholm: Publica, 1996. ISBN 91-38-92565-6
- Politikerförakt eller mogen misstro? Stockholm: Svenska kommunförbundet, 1998. ISBN 91-7099-759-4
- Premiär för personval. Forskningsrapporter utgivna av Rådet för utvärdering av 1998 års val. SOU 1999:92. (Editor, with Sören Holmberg). ISBN 91-7610-809-0
- Demokratins trotjänare. Lokalt partiarbete förr och nu. Demokratiutredningens forskarvolym X, SOU 1999:130. (With Gullan Gidlund). ISBN 91-7610-765-5
- Politikens meningslöshet. Om misstro, cynism och utanförskap. Malmö: Liber förlag, 2000. ISBN 91-47-06126-X
- Att lyckas med välfärdsreformer. Erfarenheter, strategier och förutsättningar. Stockholm: Reforminstitutet, 2001. ISBN 91-89613-00-7
- Uppsala stads historia. 11, Nittonhundratalets Uppsala. (With Hans Norman). Uppsala: Almqvist & Wiksell, 2002. ISBN 91-971216-9-X (inb)
- Mellan ljusblå och mörkblå: Gunnar Heckscher som högerledare. Stockholm: SNS, 2004. ISBN 91-7150-938-0 (inb)
- Svensk politisk historia 1809–1975. (1st edition) Lund, Studentlitteratur, 2004. ISBN 91-44-04262-0 (2nd ed., Lund : Studentlitteratur, 2005, ISBN 91-44-04309-0.)
- Folkomröstningar. Stockholm: SNS förlag, 2005. ISBN 91-7150-982-8
- Svensk politisk historia: strid och samverkan under tvåhundra år, Lund: Studentlitteratur, 2007. ISBN 978-91-44-04857-4
- Politiskt ledarskap. Malmö: Liber, 2009. ISBN 978-91-47-08675-7
