= Sure Gonna Miss Her =

Single by Gary Lewis & the Playboys

from the album Hits Again
- B-side: "I Don't Wanna Say Goodnight"
- Released: March 1966
- Genre: Pop rock
- Length: 2:31
- Label: Liberty
- Songwriter: Bobby Russell
- Producer: Snuff Garrett

Gary Lewis & the Playboys singles chronology
"She's Just My Style" (1965)	"Sure Gonna Miss Her" (1966)	"Green Grass" (1966)

"Sure Gonna Miss Her" is a song written by Bobby Russell and was recorded by Gary Lewis & the Playboys. The song reached No. 9 on The Billboard Hot 100 in 1966, and No. 21 in Canada.

It was first recorded with prominent guitar and drums, but was rejected. It was re-recorded with added horns and became the hit single version which was featured on mono copies of the Hits Again! and Golden Greats albums. However, their stereo counterparts feature the original version without the horns.

Gary Lewis told interviewer Ray Shasho in 2013 that "You know what's funny though, the largest selling internet tune of mine is "Sure Gonna Miss Her," even above "This Diamond Ring" and "She's Just My Style." It's the biggest selling record of mine on the internet. It's a great song, but I would never figure that one above the others."

== Personnel ==
According to the AFM contract sheet, the following musicians played on the tracks.

Stereo album version (recorded on August 20, 1965)

- Leon Russell - session leader
- Snuff Garrett
- Gary Lewis
- Carl Radle
- David Walker
- Tommy Tripplehorn

Mono single and album version (recorded on October 13, 1965)

- Leon Russell - session leader
- Snuff Garrett
- Gary Lewis
- John R. West
- Carl Radle
- Tommy Tripplehorn
- Jim Keltner
- Henry Lewy
