= Statens offentliga utredningar =

Swedish government official report series

- Front cover of SOU 1967:28 "Freedom of the press and Copyright".
- Country: Sweden
- Website: www.sou.gov.se
- ISSN: 0375-250X
- OCLC: 18998807

Statens offentliga utredningar (SOU), "Swedish Government Official Reports", is the name of an official series of reports of committees appointed and convened by the Government of Sweden for the analysis of issues in anticipation of a proposed legislation before the Riksdag or the issuance of ordinances. The National Library of Sweden has digitized all SOU published between 1922 and 1999, numbering 6129 in total.

Reports from committees conducted within a Swedish government ministry are published in another series, called "Departementsserien" (Ds, "Ministry Publications Series").

== See also ==
- Public inquiry
- Royal Commission
- White paper
- Norwegian Official Report
