= Gene McDaniels =

American R&B and soul singer-songwriter (1935–2011)

- McDaniels in 2010 (Photo by Frank Beacham)

Background information
- Also known as: Eugene McDaniels, The Left Reverend McD
- Born: Eugene Booker McDaniels; February 12, 1935; Kansas City, Kansas, U.S.
- Died: July 29, 2011 (aged 76) Kittery Point, Maine, U.S.
- Genres: Soul; R&B; jazz
- Occupations: Singer, songwriter, producer
- Instruments: Vocals, saxophone, trumpet
- Years active: 1960–2011
- Labels: Liberty, London, Columbia, RCA, Atlantic, Ode
- Website: genemcdaniels.com

Eugene Booker McDaniels (February 12, 1935 – July 29, 2011) was an American singer, producer and songwriter. He had his greatest recording success in the early 1960s, reaching number three on the U.S. Billboard Hot 100 singles chart with "A Hundred Pounds of Clay" and number five with "Tower of Strength", both hits in 1961. He had continued success as a songwriter with "Compared to What".

== Background ==
Born in Kansas City, Kansas, McDaniels grew up in Omaha, Nebraska. As well as singing gospel music in church, he developed a love of jazz learning to play the saxophone and trumpet. After forming a singing group, the Echoes of Joy, later known as the Sultans, in his teens, he studied at the University of Omaha Conservatory of Music before joining the Mississippi Piney Woods Singers, with whom he toured in California.

== Career ==
=== 1960s–1970s ===
In California McDaniels began singing in jazz clubs, achieving recognition with the Les McCann Trio, and came to the attention of Sy Waronker of Liberty Records.

After recording two unsuccessful singles and an album, McDaniels teamed with producer Snuff Garrett, with whom he recorded his first hit, "A Hundred Pounds of Clay", which reached number 3 in the Billboard Hot 100 chart in early 1961 and sold over one million copies, earning gold disc status. Its follow-up, "A Tear", was less successful but his third single with Garrett, "Tower of Strength", co-written by Burt Bacharach, reached number 5 and won McDaniels his second gold record. "Tower of Strength" reached number 49 in the UK Singles Chart, losing out to Frankie Vaughan's chart-topping version.

In 1962, McDaniels appeared performing "Another Tear Falls" in the movie It's Trad, Dad! directed by Richard Lester. He continued to have hit records, including "Chip Chip", "Point Of No Return", and "Spanish Lace". Each record was released in 1962, but his suave style of singing gradually became less fashionable, as the public started to favor British acts such as The Beatles. In 1965, "Point Of No Return" was recorded by the British R&B band Georgie Fame and the Blue Flames on their UK Columbia EP Fame At Last. Also in 1965, McDaniels moved to Columbia Records, with little success, and in 1968, after the assassination of Dr. Martin Luther King, he left the US to live in Denmark and Sweden where he concentrated on songwriting.

After the late 1960s, McDaniels turned his attention to a more black consciousness form of music, and his best-known song in this genre was "Compared to What", a jazz-soul protest song made famous (and into a hit) by Les McCann and Eddie Harris on their album Swiss Movement. It was also covered by Roberta Flack, Ray Charles, Della Reese, John Legend, the Roots, Sweetwater, and others. He returned to the US in 1971 and recorded thereafter as Eugene McDaniels.

McDaniels also attained the top spot on the chart as a songwriter. In 1974, Flack reached number 1 with his "Feel Like Makin' Love" (not to be confused with the Bad Company song of the same name), which received a Grammy Award nomination. McDaniels received a BMI award for outstanding radio airplay; at the time he was given the award, the song already had over five million plays.

In the early 1970s, McDaniels recorded on the Atlantic label, which released his albums Headless Heroes of the Apocalypse and Outlaw.

=== 1980s–2000s ===
In the 1980s, McDaniels recorded an album with the percussionist Terry Silverlight, which was not released. In 2005, McDaniels released Screams & Whispers on his own record label.

In 2009, it was announced that McDaniels was to release a new album, Evolution's Child, which featured his lyrics, and a number of songs composed or arranged with pianist Ted Brancato. Some of the songs featured jazz musician Ron Carter on concert bass and Terri Lyne Carrington on drums. McDaniel's "Jagger the Dagger" was featured on the Tribe Vibes breakbeat compilation album, after it had been sampled by A Tribe Called Quest.

McDaniels also appeared in films. They included It's Trad, Dad! (1962, released in the United States as Ring-A-Ding Rhythm), which was directed by Richard Lester. McDaniels also appeared in The Young Swingers (1963). He is briefly seen singing in the choir in the 1974 film Uptown Saturday Night. He was the original voice actor for "Nasus", a champion in the computer game League of Legends.

In 2010 he launched a series of YouTube videos on his website, featuring his music and thoughts on some of his creations.

== Personal life and death ==
McDaniels lived as a self-described "hermit" in the state of Maine.

McDaniels died peacefully on July 29, 2011, at his home, survived by his third wife and six children.

== Discography ==
=== Albums ===
Year	Album	Record Label
1960	In Times Like These	Liberty Records
1960	Somestimes I'm Happy Sometimes I'm Blue	Liberty Records
1961	100 Lbs. of Clay!	Liberty Records
1961	Tower of Strength	Liberty Records
1962	Hit After Hit	Liberty Records
1962	Gene McDaniels Sings Movie Memories	Liberty Records
1963	The Wonderful World of Gene McDaniels	Liberty Records
1966	The Facts of Life	Liberty Records
1970	Outlaw	Atlantic Records
1971	Headless Heroes of the Apocalypse	Atlantic Records
1975	Natural Juices	Ode Records
2004	Screams and Whispers	Genepool Records

As Universal Jones

Year	Album	Record Label
1972	Universal Jones Vol. 1	MGM Records

=== Singles ===
Year	Titles (A-side, B-side) Both sides from same album except where indicated	Peak chart positions				Record Label	Album
Year	Titles (A-side, B-side) Both sides from same album except where indicated	US	AC	R&B	UK	Record Label	Album
1960	"In Times Like These" b/w Once Before" (Non-album track)	–	–	–	–	Liberty Records	In Times Like These
1960	"Green Door" b/w "The Facts of Life"	–	–	–	–	Liberty Records	Sometimes I'm Happy Sometimes I'm Blue
1961	"A Hundred Pounds Of Clay" b/w "Come On Take A Chance" (Non-album track)	3	–	11	–	Liberty Records	100 Lbs. Of Clay!
1961	"Take Good Care Of Her" b/w "Are You Sincere"	–	–	–	–	Liberty Records	100 Lbs. Of Clay!
1961	"A Tear" b/w "She's Come Back" (Non-album track)	31	–	–	–	Liberty Records	Tower Of Strength
1961	"Tower Of Strength" b/w "The Secret"	5	–	5	49	Liberty Records	Tower Of Strength
1961	"Chip Chip" b/w "Another Tear Falls" (Non-album track)	10	–	–	–	Liberty Records	Hit After Hit
1962	"Funny" b/w "Chapel Of Tears" (Non-album track)	99	–	–	–	Liberty Records	Tower Of Strength
1962	"Point Of No Return" b/w "Warmer Than A Whisper" (Non-album track)	21	–	23	–	Liberty Records	Hit After Hit
1962	"Spanish Lace" b/w "Somebody's Waiting" (Non-album track)	31	–	–	–	Liberty Records	Spanish Lace
1963	"The Puzzle" b/w "Cry Baby Cry" (Non-album track)	–	–	–	–	Liberty Records	Golden Greats
1963	"It's a Lonely Town (Lonely Without You)" b/w "False Friends"	64	30	–	–	Liberty Records	Non-album tracks
1963	"Anyone Else" b/w "The Old Country" (from The Wonderful World Of Gene McDaniels)	–	–	–	–	Liberty Records	Non-album tracks
1964	"Make Me A Present Of You" b/w "In Times Like These" (from In Times Like These)	–	–	–	–	Liberty Records	100 Lbs. Of Clay!
1964	"(There Goes The) Forgotten Man" b/w "Emily"	–	–	–	–	Liberty Records	Non-album tracks
1965	"Walk With A Winner" b/w "A Miracle" (Non-album track)	–	–	–	–	Liberty Records	The Very Best Of Gene McDaniels
1965	"Will It Last Forever" b/w "Hang On (Just A Little Bit Longer)"	–	–	–	–	Liberty Records	Non-album tracks
1966	"Something Blue" b/w "'Cause I Love You So"	–	–	–	–	Columbia Records	Non-album tracks
1967	"Touch Of Your Lips" b/w "Sweet Lover No More"	–	–	–	–	Columbia Records	Non-album tracks
1971	"Tell Me Mr. President" b/w "The Lord Is Back"	–	–	–	–	Atlantic Records	Non-album tracks
1973	"River" b/w "Ol' Heartbreak Top Ten"	–	–	–	–	MGM Records	Non-album tracks

As Universal Jones

Year	Titles (A-side, B-side)	Peak chart positions				Record Label	Album
Year	Titles (A-side, B-side)	US	AC	R&B	UK	Record Label	Album
1972	"River" b/w "Feeling That Glow"	115	37	–	–	MGM Records	Universal Jones Vol. 1
1972	"We All Know A Lot Of Things But It Don't Never Show" b/w "Tuesday Morning"	–	–	–	–	MGM Records	Universal Jones Vol. 1

=== Sideman ===
Year	Artist	Album	Record Label
1969	Bobby Hutcherson	Now! (Bobby Hutcherson album)	Blue Note

=== Produced by Eugene McDaniels ===
- Richard Roundtree, "The Man From Shaft" 1972
- Merry Clayton, Keep Your Eye on the Sparrow 1975
- Gladys Knight & the Pips, 2nd Anniversary 1975
- Melba Moore, Peach Melba 1975
- Gene McDaniels, Natural Juices 1975
- Nancy Wilson, This Mother's Daughter 1976
- Jimmy Smith, Sit on It 1977
- The Voltage Brothers, "The Voltage Brothers" 1978
- The Floaters, Float Into the Future 1979
- Jennifer Rush "Loving is a Good Thing" 1980
- Phyllis Hyman, "Meet Me on the Moon", 1991
- Carri Coltrane, The First Time 1999
- Carri Coltrane, Flamenco Sketches 1998
- Eugene McDaniels, Screams and Whispers 2004

== Filmography ==
- It's Trad, Dad! (a.k.a. Ring-A-Ding Rhythm, 1962)
- The Young Swingers (1963)
- Roots (1977 miniseries) (1977)
- Devils Minion (2009)

== Video game roles ==
- League of Legends – Nasus (voice-actor)
