= Harvey Konigsberg =

American painter

Harvey Konigsberg (born 1940) is an artist and aikido teacher. He is an 8th dan Shihan, making him one of the most senior aikido practitioners within the Aikikai.

Harvey Konigsberg was born in New York City in 1940. He studied Art at New York University and at the University of Miami. After completing his university studies in 1964, Konigsberg returned to New York City to begin a long and successful career as an artist.

== Art ==
During the mid to late 1960s, while Konigsberg was working on his Whale series of paintings, and on his Jazz series. He and his part-Blackfoot fashion-designer wife (Patti Konigsberg) were central figures in a group of aspiring young New York artists. He and Patti held a vibrant 'salon' gathering that many artists and musicians, writers and fashion designers regularly attended.

In the late 1960s the Konigsbergs moved briefly to Montreal, where they quickly rose to social prominence through friendships with English Canadians including Leonard Cohen and Irving Leighton. Shortly after Konigsberg's brilliant first Canadian show in 1970 (Gallerie D'Youville, Montreal), the Konigsbergs again returned to New York.

Through the 1970s, Konigsberg's art career flourished, with frequent one-man shows at galleries such as Starkman (NYC), Dallas (Texas) and Runyon-Winchell (NYC). Konigsberg fine art is inspired by a variety of subjects, with many focusing on the visual dynamics of both aikido and music performance.

== Aikido ==
In parallel with his painting career, Konigsberg began studying aikido in 1965, shortly after his arrival back in New York City at the finish of his University studies. In 1972 Konigsberg began training in iaido.

In the mid 1980s Konigsberg established a studio in Woodstock, New York. Since then he has maintained a presence in Woodstock as an artist and as an aikido instructor.

One of the original students of Yoshimitsu Yamada, Konigsberg has now been practicing aikido for over 50 years. He is the Chief Instructor at Woodstock Aikido, a dojo located in the Woodstock Byrdcliffe community. He currently holds the 8th dan rank in Aikikai Aikido, with the title of Shihan (master instructor). He is the senior member of the Aikido Technical Committee, and also has a dan ranking in iaido. A large number of his longtime students have now attained the ranks of 4th, 5th and 6th dan Shidoin in aikido.

In addition to his instructing practice in Woodstock, Konigsberg also instructs at the New York Aikikai in Manhattan and teaches seminars across the U.S. and abroad.

== Corporate collections ==
- Chromacomp Collection
- Freehold Racecourse
- Gulf Oil Collection
- Hasegawa Enterprise Co., Ltd.
- Mitsukoshi Collection
- Pimlico Collection, Pimlico Racecourse
- Dean Witter Reynolds
- Sperry Rand Collection

== Museum collections ==
- Joe and Emily Lowe Museum of Fine Arts; Coral Gables, Florida
- Madison Square Garden Museum of Sports

== Solo exhibitions ==
- 1963 - Rogues Gallery; Miami, Florida
- 1965 - Cinema I Gallery; Springfield, Massachusetts
- 1966 - Mark of the Phoenix Gallery; NYC
- 1967 - James David Gallery; Miami, Florida
- 1968 - Hudson Guild Gallery; NYC
- 1969 - Gloria Luria Gallery; Miami, Florida
- 1970 - Gallerie D'Youville; Montreal, Quebec, Canada
- 1970 - Starkman Gallery, NYC
- 1972 - Dallas Gallery, Dallas, Texas
- 1975 - Runyon-Winchell Gallery; NYC
- 1976 - Runyon-Winchell Gallery; NYC
- 1977 - Runyon-Winchell Gallery; NYC
- 1979 - Runyon-Winchell Gallery; NYC
- 1980 - Brewster Gallery; NYC
- 1981 - Brewster Gallery; NYC
- 1983 - Brewster Gallery; NYC
- 1983 - Preakness Week Exhibition; Pimlico, Maryland
- 1984 - Preakness Week Exhibition; Pimlico, Maryland
- 1985 - Brewster Gallery; NYC
- 1988 - Bell Gallery; Woodstock, New York
