= Green Grass (song) =

Single by Gary Lewis & the Playboys

from the album Hits Again
- B-side: "I Can Read Between the Lines"
- Released: 1966
- Recorded: 1966
- Genre: Pop rock
- Length: 2:13
- Label: Liberty
- Songwriter(s): Roger Cook, Roger Greenaway

Gary Lewis & the Playboys singles chronology
"Sure Gonna Miss Her" (1966)	"Green Grass" (1966)	"My Heart's Symphony" (1966)

"Green Grass" is a song written by Roger Cook and Roger Greenaway and was recorded by Gary Lewis & the Playboys. The song reached #8 on The Billboard Hot 100 in 1966, and #1 in Canada.
