= This Diamond Ring =

1965 single by Gary Lewis & the Playboys

"This Diamond Ring" is a 1965 song written by Al Kooper, Bob Brass and Irwin Levine. The original demo was sung by Jimmy Radcliffe. It was first released as a single by Sammy Ambrose on Musicor #1061, then by Gary Lewis & the Playboys on Liberty #55756. Lewis' version charted first, number 101 on the January 2, 1965, Billboard "Bubbling Under" chart. Both versions charted on January 9, Lewis still at number 101 and Ambrose at number 117. Ambrose dropped off the chart at that point, but Lewis made number 65 on the Billboard Hot 100 chart the next week (January 16) and his version continued to climb until it reached number 1 on February 20, 1965.

== Gary Lewis & the Playboys version ==
"This Diamond Ring"

Single by Gary Lewis & the Playboys

from the album This Diamond Ring
- B-side: "Hard to Find" (original B-side); "Tijuana Wedding" (later pressings)
- Released: January 1965
- Recorded: November 19, 1964
- Studio: United Western Recorders, Hollywood, California
- Genre: Pop rock
- Length: 2:15
- Label: Liberty
- Songwriter(s): Al Kooper, Bob Brass, Irwin Levine
- Producer(s): Snuff Garrett

Gary Lewis & the Playboys singles chronology
"This Diamond Ring" (1965)	"Count Me In" (1965)

According to David Brackett, Lewis' vocals were heavily supported by Ron Hicklin's overdubs. The session drummer was Hal Blaine, Joe Osborn played bass and Leon Russell played keyboards and arranged the music. The song was produced by Snuff Garrett. Lewis has denied claims that the Playboys did not play on the record, and says that not only was the band largely self-contained, but the Wrecking Crew session musicians only came to do overdubs or solos.

Although it has been his biggest commercial success as a songwriter, Al Kooper has reportedly stated many times that he was unhappy with the record. He originally hoped the song would be recorded by a group like The Drifters and based on the original demo of the song as recorded by Jimmy Radcliffe. Kooper would later re-visit the song, recording a funky version for his 1976 album Act Like Nothing's Wrong.

== Charts ==
Chart (1965)	Peak position
Australia	6
Canada RPM Top Singles	3
US Billboard Hot 100	1

== Other versions ==
- Alvin and the Chipmunks recorded the song for their 1965 album Chipmunks à Go-Go.
- Billy Fury included it on the 1965 Decca album 14, also known as The Lord's Taverners Charity Album.
- Singer Wendy Hill released an answer record to “This Diamond Ring” entitled “(Gary, Please Don’t Sell) My Diamond Ring” on Liberty Records. The single “Bubbled Under” the Billboard Hot 100 Charts at No. 134 in 1965.
