= Ordinary Fool =

Studio album by Paul Williams
- Released: 1975
- Recorded: A&M (Hollywood); Sound Labs (Hollywood)
- Genre: Pop
- Label: A&M
- Producer: Paul Williams

Paul Williams chronology
| Phantom of the Paradise (1974) | Ordinary Fool (1975) | Classics (1977) |

Professional ratings
Review scores
| Source | Rating |
|---|---|
| AllMusic | 2/5 stars |

Ordinary Fool is an album by Paul Williams, released in 1975. Notable songs from the album include "Flash", "Ordinary Fool" and "Don't Call It Love".

== Track listing ==
All tracks composed by Paul Williams; except where indicated

1. "Flash" (Art Munson, Paul Williams)
2. "Lifeboat" (Ken Ascher, Paul Williams)
3. "Lonestar" (Ken Ascher, Paul Williams)
4. "Time and Tide"
5. "Even Better Than I Know Myself"
6. "Don't Call It Love" (Art Munson, Paul Williams)
7. "Lonely Hearts" (Theme from The Day of the Locust) (John Barry, Paul Williams)
8. "Old Souls" (From Phantom of the Paradise)
9. "Ordinary Fool" (From Bugsy Malone)
10. "Soul Rest"

Ella Fitzgerald recorded "Ordinary Fool" on her Pablo release, Montreux '77. The Carpenters also recorded a version, which appeared on their 1983 album Voice Of The Heart.

== Charts ==
| Chart (1976) | Peak position |
|---|---|
| US Billboard 200 | 146 |
