= Save Your Heart for Me =

Single by Gary Lewis & the Playboys

from the album A Session with Gary Lewis and the Playboys
- B-side: "Without a Word of Warning"
- Released: June 1965
- Genre: Pop
- Length: 1:56
- Label: Liberty
- Songwriters: Gary Geld, Peter Udell
- Producer: Snuff Garrett

Gary Lewis & the Playboys singles chronology
"Count Me In" (1965)	"Save Your Heart for Me" (1965)	"Everybody Loves a Clown" (1965)

"Save Your Heart for Me" is a song written by Gary Geld and Peter Udell. The song was originally written for and recorded by singer Brian Hyland in 1963. Although not released as a single in its own right, it was the B-side to Hyland's song "I'm Afraid to Go Home" and appeared on Hyland's 1994 greatest-hits album.

"Save Your Heart for Me" is best known in a version recorded in 1965 by American pop group Gary Lewis & the Playboys and appears on the group's 1965 album A Session with Gary Lewis and the Playboys. Lewis and his band released their version as a single in June 1965, and it peaked at number two on the Billboard Hot 100 chart the week of August 21, 1965, behind "I Got You Babe" by Sonny & Cher. It went to number one on the Billboard easy listening chart for three weeks in August 1965. Patty Duke covered the song on her 1965 album Don't Just Stand There. The song was covered by Livingston Taylor in 1993 on his album Good Friends.

Lewis credited the success of the record both to producer Snuff Garrett and to the short length of the song. Since it was less than two minutes in duration, Lewis has stated that "(I)t was played everywhere. Deejays loved it." According to Lewis, it was Garrett's idea for Gary Lewis and the Playboys to cover the song.

This song is noted for Lewis's whistling, which is heard in the instrumental introduction, as well as in the brief instrumental portion, before Lewis concludes the song.

== Chart history ==
=== Weekly charts ===
Chart (1965)	Peak position
Australia (Kent Music Report)	60
Canada RPM Top Singles	1
New Zealand (Lever Hit Parade)	4
U.S. Billboard Hot 100	2
U.S. Billboard Easy Listening	1
U.S. Cash Box Top 100	4

=== Year-end charts ===
Chart (1965)	Rank
U.S. Billboard Hot 100	59
U.S. Cash Box	70

== See also ==
- List of number-one adult contemporary singles of 1965 (U.S.)
- List of RPM number-one singles of 1965
