= Gary Lewis & the Playboys =

American pop and rock band

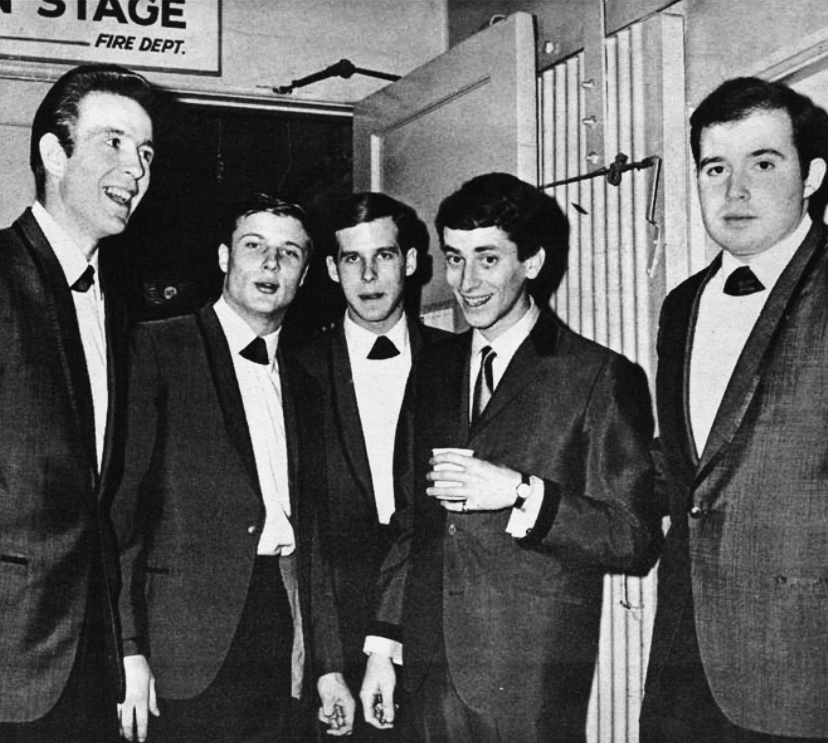
- Gary Lewis & the Playboys in 1965. From left to right: John R. West, David Walker, David Costell, Gary Lewis, and Allan Ramsay.

Background information
- Genres: Rock; pop; rock and roll; pop rock
- Years active: 1964–present
- Label: Liberty
- Members: Gary Lewis; Nick Rather (bass/guitar); Todd Bradley (drums); Mike Gladstone (guitar); Willy O'Riley (keys)
- Past members: David Walker; Allan Ramsay; David Costell; John R. West; Carl Radle; Tom Tripplehorn; Jim Karstein; Alan Rosenthal; Bill Boatman; Charley Carey; Bobby Bond (drums); Dominic Trincini (bass)
- Website: Gary Lewis & The Playboys

Gary Lewis & the Playboys is a pop and rock group, fronted by musician Gary Lewis, the son of comedian Jerry Lewis. They are best known for their 1965 Billboard Hot 100 number-one single "This Diamond Ring", which was the first of a string of hit singles they had in 1965 and 1966. The band had an earnest, boy-next-door image similar to British Invasion contemporaries such as Herman's Hermits and Gerry and the Pacemakers. The group folded in 1970, but a version of the band later resumed touring and continues to tour, often playing for Veterans' Administration benefits.

== 1960s fame ==
The group began life as Gary & the Playboys. Gary Lewis started the band with four friends of his when he was 18. Joking at the lateness of his bandmates to practice, Lewis referred to them as "playboys", and the name stuck.

They auditioned for a job at Disneyland without telling Disneyland employees about Lewis' celebrity father. They were hired on the spot, audiences at Disneyland quickly accepted them, and the Playboys were soon playing to a full house every night.

The orchestra bandleader Les Brown, who had known Jerry Lewis for years, had told record producer Snuff Garrett that the younger Lewis was playing at Disneyland. After listening to the band, Garrett thought using Gary's famous name might sell more records, and convinced them to add "Lewis" into their name.

Garrett brought them to a recording studio with the song "This Diamond Ring" in a session financed by Jerry Lewis' wife Patti. In a 2012 interview, Lewis confirmed that he and the Playboys "played on every single track we ever did", including this song. Garrett wanted to maximize the chances for a hit, so he insisted on using experienced session musicians for the overdubs, which included guitar and keyboard solos, additional bass and drum overdubs, and timpani.

These musicians included Mike Deasy and Tommy Allsup on guitars, Leon Russell on keyboards, Joe Osborn on bass, and Hal Blaine on drums, members of the larger group known as The Wrecking Crew. Session singer Ron Hicklin did the basic vocal track. Garrett then added Lewis's voice twice, added some of the Playboys and more of Hicklin. "When I got through, he sounded like Mario Lanza", Garrett commented.

Garrett got airplay in New York City for "This Diamond Ring" by making a deal with WINS disc jockey "Murray the K" Kaufman, who ran a series of all-star concerts at theaters around the New York area. Garrett promised that if Kaufman played Lewis' record, the Playboys would do his shows. Garrett then had Jerry Lewis use his contacts to get his son onto The Ed Sullivan Show.

However, Sullivan had a general policy that all acts appearing on his show were to perform live. Since so many studio tricks had been used on the record, the Playboys could not recreate its sound. In compromise, Lewis sang along with pre-recorded tracks as the Playboys pretended to play their instruments.

The January 1965 broadcast made Gary Lewis and the Playboys instant stars. "This Diamond Ring" went to No. 1, sold over one million copies by April 1965, and became a gold disc. However, by the end of 1965 only West and Lewis remained in the band. Other later band members included Tommy Tripplehorn, father of actress Jeanne Tripplehorn; Carl Radle (died 1980); Jimmy Karstein; Randy Ruff; Pete Vrains; Bob Simpson; Adolph Zeugner; Les John; Wayne Bruno; and Dave Gonzalez.

The group was one of only two acts during the 1960s whose first seven releases on the Billboard Hot 100 reached that chart's top 10 (The Lovin' Spoonful was the other). The singles were "This Diamond Ring" (No. 1), "Count Me In" (the only non-British Commonwealth record in the Hot 100's Top 10 on May 8, 1965, at No. 2), "Save Your Heart for Me" (No. 2), "Everybody Loves a Clown" (No. 4), "She's Just My Style" (No. 3), "Sure Gonna Miss Her" (No. 9), and "Green Grass" (No. 8). Lewis was drafted into the U.S. Army in January 1967, with previously made recordings continuing to reach the Hot 100, but with decreasing success.

In 1966, the Playboys held their own television special called "An Evening With Gary Lewis & The Playboys", which aired on WGN 9. The line-up on this special consisted of Gary Lewis (vocals, guitar), Tom Tripplehorn (guitar), Carl Radle (bass), John West (cordovox) and Jim Karstein (drums).

On his 1968 discharge, Lewis immediately returned to recording, reaching the top 40 one last time with a top 20 remake of Brian Hyland's "Sealed With A Kiss", but unable to regain his group's earlier momentum. Lewis continued touring, eventually marketing the band as a nostalgia act. He also appeared and performed on many of his father's Labor Day telethons for the Muscular Dystrophy Association. Lewis owned a music store for some years in the 1970s and developed a drug habit. By 1985, he was well enough to join the nine-month “Happy Together” tour, with other groups, including the Turtles, the Buckinghams and the Grass Roots.

In all, Lewis had eight gold singles, 12 Top 40 hit singles (but only 15 Hot 100 entries (U.S.)), and four gold albums. In addition to The Ed Sullivan Show, he appeared on American Bandstand, Shindig!, Hullabaloo, The Sally Jessy Raphaël show, The Tonight Show Starring Johnny Carson, The Mike Douglas Show, Nashville Now and Wolfman Jack.

Despite the group's U.S. success, they made virtually no impact at all in the U.K.; their only UK Singles Chart appearance occurred in 1975, when a reissue of 1966's "My Heart's Symphony" peaked at No. 36. Nevertheless, at a time when British groups were dominating the American music scene, Gary Lewis & the Playboys were one of the few successful 1960s homegrown groups.

== Former Playboys later lives ==
- Carl Radle toured with Eric Clapton and his group Derek and the Dominos. Radle died of problems caused by alcohol and narcotics use on May 30, 1980, 19 days before his 38th birthday. He was posthumously inducted into the Oklahoma Music Hall of Fame in 2006.
- David Walker still performs guitar and other stringed instruments on stage and now resides in Hickory, North Carolina.
- Allan Ramsay enlisted in the Air Force in 1965, and discharged in 1967. He died in a plane crash on November 27, 1985, aged 42. At the time, he was residing in White House Station, New Jersey.
- David Costell continued his career in the music industry as a recording and mixing engineer, in Hollywood, and now lives a private life.
- John West retired from the music industry and died February 15, 2025.
- Tom Tripplehorn continued to perform live on stage. He married Suzanne Ferguson, before divorcing in 1965. Their daughter, Jeanne, became a famous actress. Tom died on 15 March 2019, aged 75.

== Members ==
- Gary Lewis (born Gary Harold Lee Levitch, July 31, 1945, Newark, New Jersey) – vocals (1964–1970), drums (1964–1965), guitar (1965–1970)
- David Walker (born May 12, 1943, Montgomery, Alabama) – rhythm guitar (1964–1965)
- Allan Ramsay (July 27, 1943 – November 27, 1985; aged 42) – bass (1964–1965)
- David Costell (born March 15, 1944, Pittsburgh, Pennsylvania) – lead guitar (1964–1965)
- John West (July 31, 1939, Uhrichsville, Ohio – February 15, 2025) – organ, cordovox (1964–1970)
- Carl Radle (June 18, 1942 – May 30, 1980) – bass (1965–1968)
- Tom Tripplehorn (February 2, 1944 – March 15, 2019) – guitar (1965–1968)
- Jim Karstein (August 22, 1943 – March 27, 2022) – drums (1966–1968)
- Charley Carey – guitar (1968–1970)
- Alan Rosenthal – bass (1968–1970)
- Bill Boatman – drums (1968–1970)

== Discography ==
=== Singles ===
Year	Single	Chart Positions							Catalogue	B-side (featured on same album as A-side except where indicated)	Album
Year	Single	US	US AC	AUS	CAN	NZ	SA	UK	Catalogue	B-side (featured on same album as A-side except where indicated)	Album
1965	"This Diamond Ring"	1	—	6	3	4	—	—	Liberty 55756	"Hard to Find" (later replaced with "Tijuana Wedding") (both are non-LP tracks)	This Diamond Ring
1965	"Count Me In"	2	—	49	3	10	—	—	Liberty 55778	"Little Miss Go-Go"	A Session with Gary Lewis and the Playboys
1965	"Doin' the Flake" (Kellogg's Corn Flakes promo release)	—	—	—	—	—	—	—	Liberty 65–227	"This Diamond Ring" / "Little Miss Go-Go" (from This Diamond Ring and A Session with Gary Lewis and the Playboys, respectively)	non-LP track
1965	"Save Your Heart for Me"	2	1	60	1	4	—	—	Liberty 55809	"Without a Word of Warning"	A Session with Gary Lewis and the Playboys
1965	"Everybody Loves a Clown"	4	—	62	4	—	—	—	Liberty 55818	"Time Stands Still"	Everybody Loves a Clown
1965	"She's Just My Style"	3	—	53	5	17	—	—	Liberty 55846	"I Won't Make That Mistake Again"	She's Just My Style
1966	"Sure Gonna Miss Her"	9	—	72	21	—	—	—	Liberty 55865	"I Don't Wanna Say Goodnight" (non-LP track)	Hits Again
1966	"Green Grass"	8	—	64	1	—	—	—	Liberty 55880	"I Can Read Between the Lines"	Hits Again
1966	"My Heart's Symphony"	13	—	98	31	—	—	36	Liberty 55898	"Tina (I Held You in My Arms)"	(You Don't Have To) Paint Me a Picture
1966	"(You Don't Have To) Paint Me a Picture"	15	—	58	9	—	7	—	Liberty 55914	"Looking For the Stars"	(You Don't Have To) Paint Me a Picture
1966	"Where Will the Words Come From"	21	—	99	8	—	—	—	Liberty 55933	"May the Best Man Win" (from Gary Lewis and The Playboys)	(You Don't Have To) Paint Me a Picture
1967	"Way Way Out" (Way...Way Out Promo Release)	—	—	—	—	—	—	—	Liberty		non-LP track
1967	"The Loser (with a Broken Heart)"	43	—	98	34	—	—	—	Liberty 55949	"Ice Melts in the Sun" (No. 121 BB)	More Golden Greats
1967	"Girls in Love"	39	—	—	25	—	—	—	Liberty 55971	"Let's Be More Than Friends"	New Directions
1967	"Jill"	52	—	—	49	—	—	—	Liberty 55985	"New in Town" (from New Directions)	Listen!
1967	"Has She Got The Nicest Eyes"	—	—	—	—	—	—	—	Liberty 56011	"Happiness"	Rhythm!
1968	"Sealed with a Kiss"	19	32	74	7	—	—	—	Liberty 56037	"Sara Jane"	Gary Lewis Now!
1968	"Main Street"	101	—	—	—	—	—	—	Liberty 56075	"C.C. Rider"	Close Cover Before Playing
1969	"Rhythm of the Rain"	63	—	—	37	—	—	—	Liberty 56093	"Mister Memory" (from Close Cover Before Playing)	Rhythm of the Rain/Hayride
1969	"Hayride"	—	—	—	—	—	—	—	Liberty 56121	"Gary's Groove" (non-LP track)	Rhythm of the Rain/Hayride
1969	"I Saw Elvis Presley Last Night"	—	—	—	—	—	—	—	Liberty 56144	"Something is Wrong"	I'm on the Right Road Now
1970	"I'm on the Right Road Now"	—	—	—	—	—	—	—	Liberty 56158	"Great Balls of Fire"	I'm on the Right Road Now
1972	"Then Again Maybe" (Gary Lewis solo)	—	—	—	—	—	—	—	Scepter 12359	"Peace of Mind"	non-LP tracks
1975	"One Good Woman" (Gary Lewis solo)	—	—	—	—	—	—	—	Epic 50068	"Ooh Baby"	non-LP tracks

=== Albums ===
Year	Album	Billboard 200	Record Label
1965	This Diamond Ring	26	Liberty Records
1965	A Session with Gary Lewis and the Playboys	18	Liberty Records
1965	Everybody Loves a Clown	44	Liberty Records
1965	She's Just My Style	71	Liberty Records
1966	Hits Again	47	Liberty Records
1966	(You Don't Have To) Paint Me a Picture	79	Liberty Records
1967	New Directions	185	Liberty Records
1967	Listen!	–	Liberty Records
1967	Gary Lewis & The Playboys	–	Sunset Records
1968	Gary Lewis Now!	150	Liberty Records
1969	Rhythm of the Rain/Hayride	–	Liberty Records
1969	Close Cover Before Playing	–	Liberty Records
1969	Rhythm!	–	Sunset Records
1969	I'm on the Right Road Now	–	Liberty Records

=== Compilation albums ===
Year	Album	Billboard 200	Record Label
1966	Golden Greats	10	Liberty Records
1968	More Golden Greats	–	Liberty Records
1975	The Very Best of Gary Lewis and the Playboys	–	United Artists Records
1990	The Legendary Masters Series	–	EMI Records
