= Count Me In (Gary Lewis & the Playboys song) =

Single by Gary Lewis & the Playboys

from the album A Session with Gary Lewis and the Playboys
- B-side: "Little Miss Go-Go"
- Released: March 1965
- Genre: Pop rock
- Length: 2:20
- Label: Liberty
- Songwriter: Glen Hardin
- Producer: Snuff Garrett

Gary Lewis & the Playboys singles chronology
"This Diamond Ring" (1964)	"Count Me In" (1965)	"Save Your Heart for Me" (1965)

"Count Me In" is a song written by Glen Hardin and performed by Gary Lewis & the Playboys. It was produced by Snuff Garrett, arranged by Leon Russell, and reached No. 2 on the Billboard Hot 100, behind "Mrs. Brown, You've Got a Lovely Daughter" by Herman's Hermits. Outside the US, "Count Me In" went to No. 3 in Canada, and No. 49 in Australia in 1965. It was featured on their 1965 album, A Session with Gary Lewis and the Playboys.

== Other versions ==
- The Lennon Sisters covered the song on their 1967 album “On The Groovy Side.”
- On the 2009 album, Dancing the Whole Way Home by Miss Li, "Bourgeois Shangri-la" largely emulates the syncopated piano/celeste vamp used in the Gary Lewis & the Playboys song.
- The melody was used by the Playboys in an advertisement for Coca-Cola.
