= She's Just My Style =

"She's Just My Style (song)"

Single by Gary Lewis & the Playboys

from the album She's Just My Style
- B-side: "I Won't Make That Mistake Again"
- Released: Nov 17, 1965
- Recorded: 1965
- Genre: Pop rock, surf
- Length: 3:03
- Label: Liberty
- Songwriters: Al Capps, Thomas Lesslie "Snuff" Garrett, Gary Lewis, Leon Russell

Gary Lewis & the Playboys singles chronology
"Everybody Loves a Clown" (1965)	"She's Just My Style (song)" (1965)	"Sure Gonna Miss Her" (1966)

"She's Just My Style" is a song which was written by Al Capps, Thomas Lesslie "Snuff" Garrett, Gary Lewis, and Leon Russell and was recorded by Gary Lewis & the Playboys. The song reached No. 3 on the Billboard Hot 100 in January 1966, and No. 5 in Canada.

== Background ==
Gary Lewis told interviewer Ray Shasho in 2013 that he sought to emulate the style of The Beach Boys with the recording. "That's exactly what we were going for too. Even before we started writing it we said 'Let's go for The Beach Boys thing; a little rock and roll with a lot of harmony' and I was really happy the way we pulled it off."

The recording has the distinction of being the first session that studio drummer Jim Keltner played on.

== Cover versions ==
- The Astronauts
- Cub Koda
- Leon Russell
- The Ventures on their 1966 album, Where the Action Is!
