= Everybody Loves a Clown (song) =

Single by Gary Lewis & the Playboys

from the album Everybody Loves a Clown
- B-side: "Time Stands Still"
- Released: August 20, 1965
- Genre: Pop rock
- Length: 2:26
- Label: Liberty
- Songwriters: Snuff Garrett, Gary Lewis, Leon Russell

Gary Lewis & the Playboys singles chronology
"Save Your Heart for Me" (1965)	"Everybody Loves a Clown" (1965)	"She's Just My Style" (1965)

"Everybody Loves a Clown" is a song written by Snuff Garrett, Gary Lewis, and Leon Russell and was recorded by Gary Lewis & the Playboys for their 1965 album Everybody Loves a Clown. The song reached No. 4 on the Billboard Hot 100 in 1965, and also No. 4 in Canada.

== Personnel ==
According to the AFM contract sheet, the following musicians appeared at the recording session.

- Leon Russell - session leader
- Hal Blaine
- Snuff Garrett
- Gary Lewis
- Carl Radle
- David H. Costell
- John R. West
- David Walker

== Cover versions ==
- Jan and Dean on their 1966 album, Filet of Soul
- Del Shannon

== In popular culture ==
The song appears in The Simpsons episode "Treehouse of Horror III" as the music on hold for a toy company's customer service line.
