= Snuff Garrett =

American record producer (1938–2015)

- Born: Thomas Lesslie Garrett; July 5, 1938; Dallas, Texas, U.S.
- Died: December 16, 2015 (aged 77) Tucson, Arizona, U.S.
- Occupations: Disc jockey; Record producer; Singer
- Labels: Viva Records; Snuff Garrett Records

Thomas Lesslie Garrett (July 5, 1938 – December 16, 2015), known as Snuff Garrett or Tommy Garrett, was an American record producer whose most notable work was during the 1960s and 1970s.

== Early years ==
Garrett was born in Dallas, Texas and attended South Oak Cliff High School, dropping out in the 10th grade. In 1976, he returned to Dallas to receive a special high school diploma that conferred an "honorary music degree."

== Biography ==
At seventeen, Garrett was a disc jockey in Lubbock, Texas, where he met Buddy Holly. He is often still mentioned on the Lubbock oldies station KDAV on a program hosted by his friend Jerry "Bo" Coleman. Garrett also worked in radio in Wichita Falls, Texas, where he performed on-air stunts. On February 3, 1959, Garrett broadcast his own tribute show to Holly after he was killed (along with Ritchie Valens and the Big Bopper) in a plane crash in Iowa.

In 1959, Garrett became a staff producer at Liberty Records in Hollywood, after having joined the label to work in the promotions department. Although not a musician, Garrett showed he had a knack for finding hit songs, going on to produce a string of hits and becoming the label's head of A&R until he left Liberty in 1966. His first job as producer for the label was on Johnny Burnette's "Settin' the Woods on Fire" on July 9, 1959. Among Garrett's roster of artists were Bobby Vee, Johnny Burnette, Gene McDaniels, Buddy Knox, Walter Brennan, Gary Lewis & the Playboys, and Del Shannon.

Garrett was invited early on to produce the Monkees before they had become a major selling act, but a test session did not go well, with the Monkees preferring to work with Boyce and Hart, writers of "Last Train to Clarksville" and the Monkees' theme song.

He was also responsible for hiring Phil Spector for a short period as an assistant producer. Many of Garrett's hit singles came from songs by the Brill Building songwriters in New York City. Others who worked closely with Garrett include future recording star Leon Russell, who often arranged his productions, and Lenny Waronker, Liberty co-founder Simon Waronker's son who became a producer in his own right and eventually president of Warner Bros. Records. Later, after leaving Liberty, Garrett worked with Cher and Sonny & Cher and had his own record labels, Snuff Garrett Records and Viva Records, which the catalog was licensed to Warner Bros during the 1980s.

Between 1961 and 1969, Garrett produced The 50 Guitars of Tommy Garrett, a series of over 25 instrumental albums on Liberty Records featuring solo guitar work by Tommy Tedesco, six of which appeared on the Billboard Top LPs chart.

In 1966, Garrett produced an album by singer-songwriter Sonny Curtis on the Viva label, The 1st of Sonny Curtis, which contains some of Curtis' most popular tunes, including "Walk Right Back" (an Everly Brothers hit). Other tracks that came out of this session are "My Way of Life", "Hung Up in Your Eyes", and "I Fought the Law and the Law Won". In 1966–67, Garrett and J. J. Cale co-produced A Trip Down the Sunset Strip (attributed to the Leathercoated Minds), a compilation of psychedelic covers, together with four instrumentals of Cale's own composition.

In addition to his hits with Sonny & Cher for Kapp Records and MCA Records in the 1970s, Garrett also produced Vicki Lawrence's "The Night the Lights Went Out in Georgia" for Bell Records (a song written by Lawrence's then-husband Bobby Russell), and Tanya Tucker's "Lizzie and the Rainman" for MCA. Both of these songs had been intended for Cher; but her husband and manager at the time, Sonny Bono, thought it might offend Cher's Southern fans. Other artists produced by Garrett in the 1970s included Brenda Lee and "singing cowboy" Roy Rogers. These recordings and others marked a shift by Garrett away from pop-rock toward the easy-listening "countrypolitan" sound.

Garrett worked regularly with the Johnny Mann Singers and the Ron Hicklin Singers on many projects, and was responsible for the new sound of the Ray Conniff Singers in the early 1970s (which employed the Hicklin Singers), producing two albums with Conniff. Garrett also produced several tracks by Nancy Sinatra in the mid-1970s that were issued by Private Stock Records. In 1976, Garrett set up a sublabel of Casablanca Records, Casablanca West. The label released just one album and two singles before folding. In 1978, Garrett produced the country-oriented soundtrack of Clint Eastwood's Every Which Way but Loose, which appeared on Garrett's latter-day label, Viva Records.

In 1976, when home video was in its infancy, Garrett bought cassette rights to the old RKO, Republic and Hal Roach (Laurel and Hardy) films for what United Press International termed "a pittance." By 1980, the 800-title library of his company, The Nostalgia Merchant, was earning $2.3 million a year. "Nobody wanted cassettes four years ago...It wasn't the first time people called me crazy. It was a hobby with me which became big business", Garrett told UPI.

Garrett lived in Bell Canyon, California, in a ranch built for himself.

== Death ==
Garrett died of cancer in Tucson, Arizona, at the age of 77.

== Awards ==
Garrett was inducted into the Texas Radio Hall of Fame on November 14, 2015, in Austin, Texas.
