= 1965 in music =

List of notable events in music that took place in the year 1965.

== Specific locations ==
- 1965 in British music
- 1965 in Japanese music
- 1965 in Norwegian music

== Specific genres ==
- 1965 in country music
- 1965 in jazz

== Events ==
- January 4 – Fender Musical Instruments Corporation is sold to CBS for $13 million.
- January 12 – Hullabaloo premieres on NBC. The first show includes performances by The New Christy Minstrels, comedian Woody Allen, actress Joey Heatherton and a segment from London in which Brian Epstein introduces The Zombies and Gerry and the Pacemakers.
- January 17 – The Rolling Stones drummer Charlie Watts' book Ode to a High Flying Bird, a tribute to jazz great Charlie Parker, is published.
- January 21
  - The Animals' show at New York's Apollo Theater is canceled after the U.S. Immigration Department forces the group to leave the theater.
  - The Rolling Stones and Roy Orbison travel to Sydney to begin their Australian tour.
- January 23 – "Downtown" hits No. 1 in the US singles chart, making Petula Clark the first British female vocalist to reach the coveted position since the arrival of The Beatles.
- January 24 – The Animals appear a second time on The Ed Sullivan Show.
- January 27 – Paul Simon broadcasts on BBC's Five to Ten show, discussing and playing 13 songs, 12 of which would appear on his May-recorded and August-released UK-only solo album, The Paul Simon Songbook.
- February 6 – Donovan performs the first of three performances on the British television program Ready Steady Go! This presents him to a widespread audience for the first time.
- February 12 – NME reports The Beatles will star in a film adaptation of Richard Condon's novel A Talent for Loving. The story is about a 2,253-kilometer (1,400 mi) horse race that takes place in the old west. The film is never made.
- February 19 - Rod Stewart with The Soul Agents perform their first important concert in London club London Borough of Harrow
- February 24 – The Beatles begin filming their second film, Help!
- March 6 – The Temptations' "My Girl", written by Smokey Robinson and Ronald White, from Motown Records, reaches number 1.
- March 18 – The Rolling Stones members Mick Jagger, Brian Jones and Bill Wyman are fined five pounds for urinating on the wall of a London petrol station. The band had asked to use the restroom, but it was out of order.
- March 20 – The 10th Eurovision Song Contest in Naples, Italy, is won by 17-year-old France Gall, representing Luxembourg, with the Serge Gainsbourg-composed "Poupée de cire, poupée de son".
- March 21 – The Supremes have their fourth number-one single, "Stop! In the Name of Love", written by Holland–Dozier–Holland.
- April – Michael Tippett is invited as guest composer to the music festival in Aspen, Colorado. The visit leads to major changes in his style.
- April 11 – The New Musical Express poll winners' concert takes place featuring performances by The Beatles, The Animals, The Rolling Stones, Freddie and the Dreamers, the Kinks, the Searchers, Herman's Hermits, The Anita Kerr Singers, The Moody Blues, Wayne Fontana and the Mindbenders, Donovan, Them, Cilla Black, Dusty Springfield and Tom Jones.
- April 13 – The 7th Annual Grammy Awards are held in Beverly Hills. João Gilberto and Stan Getz each win the most awards with four, the latter winning Record of the Year with Astrud Gilberto for the song "The Girl from Ipanema" and the pair collectively winning Album of the Year for Getz/Gilberto. Louis Armstrong's "Hello, Dolly!" wins Song of the Year, while The Beatles win Best New Artist.
- April 21 – The Beach Boys appear on Shindig! performing their most recent hit, "Do You Wanna Dance?"
- April 26 – The first complete performance of American composer Charles Ives' Symphony No. 4, conducted by Leopold Stokowski with the American Symphony Orchestra at Carnegie Hall in New York City, is presented eleven years after the composer's death and around forty years since he last worked on it.
- May 5 – Alan Price leaves The Animals, to be replaced temporarily by Mick Gallagher and permanently by Dave Rowberry.
- May 6
  - Keith Richards and Mick Jagger begin work on "Satisfaction" in their Clearwater, Florida, hotel room. Richards comes up with the classic guitar riff while playing around with his brand new Gibson "Fuzz box".
  - The Symphony of the New World, the first racially integrated orchestra in the United States, plays its first concert, under its founding conductor Benjamin Steinberg in Carnegie Hall, New York City.
- May 8 – The British Commonwealth comes closer than it ever has, or will, to a clean sweep of the US Hot 100's top 10, lacking only a hit at number 2 instead of "Count Me In" by the American group Gary Lewis & the Playboys.
- May 9 – Bob Dylan performs the first of two concerts at London's Royal Albert Hall, concluding his tour of Europe. Audience members include The Beatles and Donovan.
- May 30 – The Animals appear a third time on The Ed Sullivan Show.
- June
  - Producer Tom Wilson, (Simon & Garfunkel) records a heavy backing band onto the song "The Sound of Silence", without the knowledge of Paul Simon, for release on a 45 rpm single, and the B-side, "We've Got A Groovey Thing Goin'". The single will eventually reach number 1 on the Billboard Hot 100 on New Year's Day 1966.
  - The US music press popularize the term "folk rock", which has been in print at least since the November 2, 1963, issue of Billboard magazine, in which "Devil's Waitin'" by the Glencoves was said to have a "wide open folk-rock sound." The term was also used of "Twins" by Kingtones (March 7, 1964), the Men (July 25, 1964), and even of Hoyt Axton. People outside the trade begin to take notice of the term in June, 1965.
- June 6 – The Supremes have their fifth consecutive number-one single, "Back in My Arms Again", written by H-D-H, from Motown Records.
- June 14 – Paul McCartney records "Yesterday".
- July 5 – Maria Callas gives her last operatic performance, as Tosca at the Royal Opera House, Covent Garden.
- July 9 – The release of the Tamil musical film Aayirathil Oruvan marks the end of the composing partnership between T. K. Ramamoorthy and M. S. Viswanathan.
- July 25 – Electric Dylan controversy: Bob Dylan, playing a second day at the Newport Folk Festival, is booed for playing an electric set with The Paul Butterfield Blues Band. Joan Baez and Donovan also play sets.
- August 6
  - The Small Faces release "Whatcha Gonna Do About It", their first single.
  - The Beatles release the soundtrack to their second movie Help!
- August 14 – The husband-and-wife American pop duo Sonny & Cher earn their first number one hit I Got You Babe. It peaks at that position in the United States, United Kingdom, Canada and New Zealand.
- August 15 – The Beatles play at Shea Stadium, the first rock concert to be held in a venue of this size. The concert also sets new world records for attendance (55,600+) and for revenue.
- August 27 – The Beatles visit Elvis Presley at his home in Bel-Air. It is the only time the band and the singer meet.
- September 30 – Donovan appears on Shindig! in the U.S. and plays Buffy Sainte-Marie's "Universal Soldier".
- October 15 – Guitarist Jimi Hendrix signs a three-year recording contract with Ed Chaplin, receiving $1 and 1% royalty on records with Curtis Knight. The agreement will later cause continuous litigation problems with Hendrix and other record labels.
- October 17 – The Animals appear a fourth time on The Ed Sullivan Show.
- October 26 – The Beatles are appointed Members of the British Empire (MBE) by the Queen. Since it is unusual at this time for popular musicians to be appointed as MBEs, a number of previous recipients complain and protest.
- November 5 – The Who release their iconic single "My Generation" in the UK. This song contains the famous line: "I hope I die before I get old"
- November 14 – The Supremes have their sixth number-one record, "I Hear A Symphony", for Motown Records.
- November 26 – Arlo Guthrie is arrested in Great Barrington, Massachusetts, for the crime of littering, perpetrated the day before (Thanksgiving) in the nearby town of Stockbridge. The resultant events and adventure will be immortalized in the song "Alice's Restaurant".
- December 3
  - The Beatles release their album Rubber Soul, along with the double A-sided single "Day Tripper / We Can Work It Out". George Harrison's performance on the sitar on the track "Norwegian Wood" leads to his becoming a pupil of Ravi Shankar.
  - The Who release their debut album My Generation.
- Undated
  - Seiji Ozawa is named the fourth music director of the Toronto Symphony Orchestra following the merger of the CBC Symphony and the Toronto Symphony.
  - Rockfield Studios (near Rockfield, Monmouthshire in Wales) becomes the world's first residential recording studio.
  - Toho College of Music is established in Kawagoe, Saitama, Japan.

== New bands ==
- See Category:Musical groups established in 1965

== Bands disbanded ==
- Paul & Paula

== Albums released ==
=== January ===
Day	Album	Artist	Notes
1	The Chipmunks Sing with Children	The Chipmunks	-
15	The Rolling Stones No. 2	The Rolling Stones	UK
21	Four Tops	Four Tops	Motown
25	Cilla	Cilla Black	-
–	A Love Supreme	John Coltrane	-
–	Dean Martin Hits Again	Dean Martin	-
–	The Folk Album	Trini Lopez	-
–	The Good Life With The Drifters	The Drifters	-
–	Live in Concert	Ray Charles	Live
–	Live! The Ike & Tina Turner Show	Ike & Tina Turner	Live
–	The Nancy Wilson Show!	Nancy Wilson	Live
–	Song for My Father	Horace Silver Quintet	-
–	The Zombies	The Zombies	Debut

=== February ===
Day	Album	Artist	Notes
13	Herman's Hermits	Herman's Hermits	Debut
13	The Rolling Stones, Now!	The Rolling Stones	US only
15	Brenda Lee Sings Top Teen Hits	Brenda Lee	-
15	The Sensitive Sound of Dionne Warwick	Dionne Warwick	-
15	Songs from My Heart....	Loretta Lynn	-
22	Orange Blossom Special	Johnny Cash	-
22	The Supremes Sing Country, Western and Pop	The Supremes	-
23	My Funny Valentine	Miles Davis	Live
–	The Animals on Tour	The Animals	-
–	Del Shannon Sings Hank Williams	Del Shannon	Hank Williams covers album
–	Goin' Out of My Head	Little Anthony & The Imperials	–
–	I'll Be There	Gerry and the Pacemakers	-
–	Leader of the Pack	The Shangri-Las	Debut
–	People Get Ready	The Impressions	-

=== March ===
Day	Album	Artist	Notes
1	Girl Happy	Elvis Presley	Soundtrack
1	Weekend in London	The Dave Clark Five	US
2	Absent Friend	Alf Henrikson	-
2	The Sound of Music	Rodgers and Hammerstein, Julie Andrews	Soundtrack
5	Kinda Kinks	The Kinks	-
5	Love Is Everything	Johnny Mathis	-
8	The Beach Boys Today!	The Beach Boys	-
10	I've Got a Tiger By the Tail	Buck Owens	-
12	The Pretty Things	The Pretty Things	Debut
22	Bringing It All Back Home	Bob Dylan	-
22	The Early Beatles	The Beatles	US only
22	Greatest Hits: From the Beginning	The Miracles	Greatest Hits
22	Latin for Lovers	Doris Day	-
22	The Temptations Sing Smokey	The Temptations	Smokey Robinson and The Miracles covers album
–	The Greatest Hits of Ike & Tina Turner	Ike & Tina Turner	Greatest Hits
–	The Great Otis Redding Sings Soul Ballads	Otis Redding	-
–	Here Are the Sonics	The Sonics	-
–	Hush, Hush, Sweet Charlotte	Patti Page	-
–	Ooooooweeee!!!	Dusty Springfield	-
–	Soul Dressing	Booker T & the M.G.s	-
–	Odetta Sings Dylan	Odetta	-

=== April ===
Day	Album	Artist	Notes
6	Beatles for Sale	The Beatles	EP
9	Begin Here	The Zombies	-
12	Dance Party	Martha and the Vandellas	-
12	We Remember Sam Cooke	The Supremes	Sam Cooke covers LP
15	Come My Way	Marianne Faithfull	-
16	Bert Jansch	Bert Jansch	-
19	Best Always	Rick Nelson	-
19	If I Ruled the World: Songs for the Jet Set	Tony Bennett	-
-	1,661 Seconds with Del Shannon	Del Shannon	-
-	Chuck Berry in London	Chuck Berry	-
-	I Go to Pieces	Peter and Gordon	-
-	Introducing The Beau Brummels	The Beau Brummels	-
-	Whipped Cream & Other Delights	Herb Alpert and the Tijuana Brass	-

=== May ===
Day	Album	Artist	Notes
3	My Name Is Barbra	Barbra Streisand	-
7	Animal Tracks	The Animals	UK
14	What's Bin Did and What's Bin Hid	Donovan	debut
17	The Versatile Brenda Lee	Brenda Lee	-
21	Along Came Jones	Tom Jones	debut
24	Before and After	Chad & Jeremy	-
-	The Astrud Gilberto Album	Astrud Gilberto	-
-	Bahia	John Coltrane	-
-	Begin to Love	Robert Goulet	-
-	Bleecker & MacDougal	Fred Neil	Debut
-	The Love Album	Trini Lopez	-
-	The Scene Changes	Perry Como	-

=== June ===
Day	Album	Artist	Notes
4	Beatles for Sale (No. 2)	The Beatles	EP
11	The Angry Young Them	Them	-
11	Got Live If You Want It	The Rolling Stones	EP
14	Beatles VI	The Beatles	US only
14	Blue Kentucky Girl	Loretta Lynn	-
21	Mr. Tambourine Man	The Byrds	Debut
28	Having a Wild Weekend	The Dave Clark Five	US
-	The 3rd Time Around	Roger Miller	
-	Bobby Vinton Sings for Lonely Nights	Bobby Vinton	-
-	For Your Love	The Yardbirds	Debut
-	Herman's Hermits on Tour	Herman's Hermits	-
-	Meanwhile Back at the Whisky à Go Go	Johnny Rivers	Live
-	Sinatra '65: The Singer Today	Frank Sinatra	-
-	Wooly Bully	Sam the Sham and the Pharaohs	featuring hit title track
-	You Were Only Fooling	Vic Damone	-

=== July ===
Day	Album	Artist	Notes
1	There Is Only One Roy Orbison	Roy Orbison	-
2	Angel Eyes	Dave Brubeck	-
5	Summer Days (And Summer Nights!!)	The Beach Boys	-
12	Doris Day's Sentimental Journey	Doris Day	-
12	The Sound of The Shadows	The Shadows	-
23	The Magnificent Moodies	The Moody Blues	Debut
23	More Hits by The Supremes	The Supremes	-
26	Before You Go	Buck Owens	-
28	Live in Paris	John Coltrane	Live
-	Country Love Songs	Vic Damone	-
-	The In Crowd	Ramsey Lewis Trio	-

=== August ===
Day	Album	Artist	Notes
2	Look at Us	Sonny & Cher	Debut
2	Johnny Cash Sings the Ballads of the True West	Johnny Cash	Double LP
6	Help!	The Beatles	-
6	Catch Us If You Can	The Dave Clark Five	UK
10	Elvis for Everyone!	Elvis Presley	Compilation
16	E.S.P.	Miles Davis	-
30	Highway 61 Revisited	Bob Dylan	-
-	Beat & Soul	The Everly Brothers	-
-	The Beau Brummels, Volume 2	Beau Brummels	-
-	The John Coltrane Quartet Plays	John Coltrane	-
-	The Paul Simon Songbook	Paul Simon	-
-	Sammy's Back on Broadway	Sammy Davis Jr.	-
-	September of My Years	Frank Sinatra	-

=== September ===
Day	Album	Artist	Notes
2	Too Many Rivers	Brenda Lee	-
6	Strangers	Merle Haggard	-
13	Going Places	Herb Alpert and the Tijuana Brass	-
15	Otis Blue/Otis Redding Sings Soul	Otis Redding	-
23	Easy	The Easybeats	
24	Out of Our Heads	The Rolling Stones	-
30	The Sweetheart Tree	Johnny Mathis	-
-	Animal Tracks	The Animals	US
-	Ballads of the Hills and Plains	Hank Williams Jr.	-
-	The Big Bad Rock Guitar of Glen Campbell	Glen Campbell	-
-	Fats Domino '65	Fats Domino	-
-	Fifth Album	Judy Collins	-
-	Fire Music	Archie Shepp	-
-	Hey Ho (What You Do to Me!)	The Guess Who	-
-	Hollies	The Hollies	-
-	My Town, My Guy & Me	Lesley Gore	-
-	The Ventures a Go-Go	The Ventures	Dolton Records
-	We and Our Cadillac	Hep Stars	-

=== October ===
Day	Album	Artist	Notes
1	Pastel Blues	Nina Simone	-
8	Ev'rything's Coming Up Dusty	Dusty Springfield	-
8	Mann Made	Manfred Mann	UK
16	All I Really Want to Do	Chér	Solo debut
18	Merry Christmas	Andy Williams	-
21	The Shadow of Your Smile	Astrud Gilberto	-
22	Fairytale	Donovan	-
22	The Return of Koerner, Ray & Glover	Koerner, Ray & Glover	-
23	Do You Believe in Magic	The Lovin' Spoonful	Debut
-	All That's Good	Frederick Roach	-
-	Basra	Pete La Roca	-
-	Bing Crosby Sings the Great Country Hits	Bing Crosby	-
-	Cute 'n' Country	Connie Smith	-
-	Farewell, Angelina	Joan Baez	-
-	Have a Holly Jolly Christmas	Burl Ives	Christmas
-	It Ain't Me Babe	The Turtles	Debut
-	My Name Is Barbra, Two...	Barbra Streisand	-
-	The Paul Butterfield Blues Band	The Paul Butterfield Blues Band	-
-	Try a Little Love	Sam Cooke	Posthumous

=== November ===
Day	Album	Artist	Notes
1	Going to a Go-Go	Smokey Robinson & the Miracles	-
1	The Supremes at the Copa	The Supremes	Live
1	The Temptin' Temptations	The Temptations	-
3	Harum Scarum	Elvis Presley	Soundtrack
3	Tages	Tages	
5	Mann Made	Manfred Mann	US
8	Beach Boys' Party!	The Beach Boys	-
11	It Don't Bother Me	Bert Jansch	-
13	Four Tops' Second Album	Four Tops	-
15	Having a Rave Up with The Yardbirds	The Yardbirds	US
15	I Like It Like That	The Dave Clark Five	US
15	Love and Kisses	Rick Nelson	_
24	Kinkdom	The Kinks	US
26	The Kink Kontroversy	The Kinks	UK
-	Dear John C.	Elvin Jones	-
-	Fresh Berry's	Chuck Berry	-
-	Hang On Sloopy	The McCoys	-
-	Hep Stars on Stage	Hep Stars	Live
-	Hoodoo Man Blues	Junior Wells' Chicago Blues Band	-
-	James Brown Plays James Brown Today & Yesterday	James Brown	-
-	Manteca!	Clare Fischer	-
-	Orbisongs	Roy Orbison	-
-	Smokin' at the Half Note	The Wynton Kelly Trio and Wes Montgomery	-

=== December ===
Day	Album	Artist	Notes
3	December's Children (And Everybody's)	The Rolling Stones	US release
3	My Generation	The Who	Debut
3	Rubber Soul	The Beatles	-
6	The Beatles' Million Sellers	The Beatles	EP
6	Turn! Turn! Turn!	The Byrds	-
17	All Systems – Go!	The Honeycombs	-
21	Here I Am	Dionne Warwick	-
-	A Charlie Brown Christmas	Vince Guaraldi	Soundtrack
-	Get the Picture?	The Pretty Things	-
-	Jackson C. Frank	Jackson C. Frank	-

=== Release date unknown ===
- 12 éxitos para 2 guitarras flamencas – Paco de Lucía & Ricardo Modrego
- Andy Williams' Dear Heart – Andy Williams
- A World of Our Own – The Seekers
- The Best of Al Hirt – Al Hirt
- Buscando Un Amor – Los Freddy's
- By Myself – Julie London
- Canzoni napoletane classiche – Mario Trevi
- Catch Us if You Can – The Dave Clark Five
- Celebrations For a Grey Day – Richard Fariña and Mimi Fariña
- Chipmunks à Go-Go - Alvin and the Chipmunks
- Cliff Richard – Cliff Richard
- Concert in the Virgin Islands – Duke Ellington
- Country Songs for City Folks – Jerry Lee Lewis
- Country Willie – His Own Songs – Willie Nelson
- Creation – John Coltrane
- Do I Hear a Waltz? – Sergio Franchi, Elizabeth Allen, Original cast
- Downtown – Petula Clark
- Drive-In Movie Time – Bobby Vinton
- Duke Ellington Plays Mary Poppins – Duke Ellington
- Ella at Duke's Place – Ella Fitzgerald and Duke Ellington
- Ella in Hamburg – Ella Fitzgerald
- Em Som Maior – Sambrasa Trio
- Feeling Good – Julie London
- The Fugs First Album – The Fugs
- The Gigolo – Lee Morgan
- The Heliocentric Worlds of Sun Ra, Volume One – Sun Ra
- Houston – Dean Martin
- I Ain't Marching Anymore – Phil Ochs
- I Know a Place – Petula Clark
- In Concert – The Dubliners
- Is It Love? – Cilla Black
- In The Beginning – The Animals
- Introducing Herman's Hermits – Herman's Hermits
- I'll Make All Your Dreams Come True – Ronnie Dove
- Jovem Guarda – Roberto Carlos
- Live at Carnegie Hall – Al Hirt
- Live at the Coconut Grove – Sergio Franchi
- Live at The Plugged Nickel – Miles Davis
- Live at the Regal – B. B. King
- L-O-V-E – Nat King Cole
- A Man and His Music – Frank Sinatra
- Maria Bethânia – Maria Bethânia
- My Kind of Broadway – Frank Sinatra
- One Kiss for Old Times' Sake – Ronnie Dove
- Our Fair Lady – Julie London
- Our Shining Hour – Sammy Davis Jr. and Count Basie
- Papa's Got a Brand New Bag – James Brown
- Patrick Sky – Patrick Sky
- Reencontro com Sambalanço Trio – Sambalanço Trio
- The Return of Roger Miller - Roger Miller
- Rolando Alarcón y sus canciones – Rolando Alarcón
- See What Tomorrow Brings – Peter, Paul & Mary
- She's Just My Style – Gary Lewis & the Playboys
- Slightly Latin – Rahsaan Roland Kirk
- A Song Will Rise – Peter, Paul & Mary
- Sounds Like the Searchers – The Searchers
- Stan Getz and Bill Evans – Stan Getz and Bill Evans
- Storm Warning! – Dick Morrissey Quartet
- Take It Easy – The Walker Brothers
- That Honey Horn Sound – Al Hirt
- That Was the Year That Was – Tom Lehrer
- They're Playing Our Song – Al Hirt
- The Transfiguration of Blind Joe Death – John Fahey
- That Travelin' Two-Beat – Bing Crosby and Rosemary Clooney
- Visor i närheten – Fred Åkerström
- ¡Viva! Vaughan – Sarah Vaughan
- The Wailing Wailers – The Wailers
- The Wonderful World of Antônio Carlos Jobim – Antônio Carlos Jobim
- The World's Greatest International Hits – Petula Clark

== Billboard Top popular records of 1965 ==
from Billboard's 1966 International Record & Talent Showcase

TOP SINGLES OF 1965 The list below represents the top singles sides of the past year (Jan. 2 through Oct. 30 issue). The rank order in no way attempts to report actual sales of any of the records involved. This chart was determined by an analysis of the week-to-week information utilized in compiling the Hot 100 chart. Many of the records, with possibly greater cumulative sales than some of those listed above them, are not so ranked because of the methodology involved in this tabulation. Records that reached their peak prior to 1965 and after the Oct. 30, 1965, issue could not be fully represented. Other records were affected in total points by the number of weeks on chart as well as week-to-week positions.

Billboard's October cutoff eliminated 17% of the 1965 year-end chart data, and prevented another 60 records from completing their full chart runs. The formula also included approximately 50 records from 1964, some of which had enough points to rank in the 1965 chart. Joel Whitburn's Records Research books, archived issues of Billboard for November–December 1964 and November 1965-March 1966, and other Hot 100 Year-End formulas were used to complete the 1965 year-end chart.

The completed chart is composed of records that entered the Billboard Hot 100 between November 1964 and December 1965. Records with chart runs that started in 1964 and ended in 1965, or started in 1965 and ended in 1966, made this chart if the majority of their chart weeks were in 1965. If not, they were ranked in the year-end charts for 1964 or 1966. If their weeks were equal, they were listed in the year they first entered. Appearing in multiple years is not permitted. Each week fifteen points were awarded to the number one record, then nine points for number two, eight points for number three, and so on. The total points a record earned determined its year-end rank. The complete chart life of each record is represented, with number of points accrued. There are no ties, even when multiple records have the same number of points. The next ranking category is peak chart position, then weeks at peak chart position, weeks in top ten, weeks in top forty, and finally weeks on Hot 100 chart.

The chart can be sorted by Artist, Song title, Recording and Release dates, Cashbox year-end ranking (CB) or units sold (sales) by clicking on the column header. Additional details for each record can be accessed by clicking on the song title, and referring to the Infobox in the right column of the song page. Billboard also has chart summaries on its website. Cashbox rankings were derived by same process as the Billboard rankings. Sales information was derived from the RIAA's Gold and Platinum database, the BRIT Certified database and The Book of Golden Discs, but numbers listed should be regarded as estimates. Grammy Hall of Fame and National Recording Registry information with sources can be found on Wikipedia.

Rank	Artist	Title	Label	Recorded	Release date	CB	Sales	Charts, Awards
1	The Rolling Stones	"(I Can't Get No) Satisfaction"	London 9766	May 12, 1965	June 5, 1965	1	4.50	US Billboard 1965 No. 1, Hot 100 No. 1 for 4 weeks, 14 total weeks, 214 points, Top Rock Tracks 1965 No. 1, Grammy Hall of Fame 1998, National Recording Registry 2006, 4,500,000 sales,
2	The Four Tops	"I Can't Help Myself (Sugar Pie Honey Bunch)"	Motown 1076	April 10, 1965	April 23, 1965	3	2.00	US Billboard 1965 No. 2, Hot 100 No. 1 for 2 weeks, 14 total weeks, 205 points, Top Soul Singles 1965 No. 1, Hot Soul Singles No. 1 for 9 weeks, 18 total weeks, 374 points, Grammy Hall of Fame 2018
3	The Righteous Brothers	"You've Lost That Lovin' Feelin'"	Phillies 124	October 21, 1964	December 1964	2	2.00	US Billboard 1965 No. 3, Hot 100 No. 1 for 2 weeks, 16 total weeks, 203 points, Top Soul Singles 1965 No. 16, Hot Soul Singles No. 2 for 1 week, 15 total weeks, 168 points, Grammy Hall of Fame 1998, National Recording Registry 2014
4	Herman's Hermits	"Mrs. Brown, You've Got a Lovely Daughter"	MGM 13341	December 1, 1964	April 1965	6	1.50	US Billboard 1965 No. 4, Hot 100 No. 1 for 2 weeks, 15 total weeks, 186 points
5	Petula Clark	"Downtown"	Warner Bros. 5494	October 16, 1964	November 1964	5	3.00	US Billboard 1965 No. 5, Hot 100 No. 1 for 2 weeks, 15 total weeks, 181 points, Grammy Hall of Fame 2003
6	The Beatles	"Yesterday"	Capitol 5498	June 1965	September 13, 1965	7	3.80	US Billboard 1965 No. 6, Hot 100 No. 1 for 4 weeks, 11 total weeks, 180 points, Grammy Hall of Fame 1997
7	The Byrds	"Turn! Turn! Turn! (To Everything There Is A Season)"	Columbia 4-43424	September 10, 1965	October 1, 1965	31	1.50	US Billboard 1965 No. 7, Hot 100 No. 1 for 3 weeks, 14 total weeks, 180 points, Grammy Hall of Fame 2001
8	Sam the Sham and the Pharaohs	Wooly Bully	MGM 13322	December 1964	March 12, 1965	22	2.00	US Billboard 1965 No. 8, Hot 100 No. 2 for 2 weeks, 18 total weeks, 172 points, Grammy Hall of Fame 2009
9	The Beatles	Help!	Capitol 5476	April 13, 1965	July 19, 1965	4	2.00	US Billboard 1965 No. 9, Hot 100 No. 1 for 3 weeks, 13 total weeks, 171 points, CashBox 1965 No. 4, Grammy Hall of Fame 2008
10	The Supremes	"Stop! In the Name of Love"	Motown 1135	January 5, 1965	February 8, 1965	19	1.20	US Billboard 1965 No. 8, Hot 100 No. 1 for 2 weeks, 12 total weeks, 170 points, Top Soul Singles 1965 No. 14, Hot Soul Singles No. 2 for 4 weeks, 14 total weeks, 175 points
11	The Beach Boys	"Help Me, Rhonda"	Capitol 5395	February 24, 1965	April 5, 1965	16	1.50	US Billboard 1965 No. 11, Hot 100 No. 1 for 2 weeks, 14 total weeks, 160 points
12	The Temptations	"My Girl"	Gordy 7038	November 17, 1964	December 21, 1964	32	2.00	US Billboard 1965 No. 12, Hot 100 No. 1 for 1 week, 13 total weeks, 158 points, Top Soul Singles 1965 No. 5, Hot Soul Singles No. 1 for 6 weeks, 16 total weeks, 279 points, Grammy Hall of Fame 1998, National Recording Registry 2017
13	Sonny and Cher	"I Got You Babe"	Atco 45-6359	June 7, 1965	July 9, 1965	8	3.00	US Billboard 1965 No. 13, Hot 100 No. 1 for 3 weeks, 14 total weeks, 157 points, Grammy Hall of Fame 2017
14	The Rolling Stones	"Get Off of My Cloud"	London 9792	September 6, 1965	September 25, 1965	9	1.75	US Billboard 1965 No. 14, Hot 100 No. 1 for 2 weeks, 12 total weeks, 152 points
15	The Supremes	"I Hear a Symphony"	Motown 1135	September 22, 1965	October 6, 1965	17	2.00	US Billboard 1965 No. 15, Hot 100 No. 1 for 2 weeks, 16 total weeks, 149 points
16	Gary Lewis and the Playboys	"This Diamond Ring"	Liberty 55756	November 30, 1964	January 1965	10	1.00	US Billboard 1965 No. 16, Hot 100 No. 1 for 2 weeks, 12 total weeks, 147 points
17	The 4 Seasons featuring The "Sound" of Frankie Valli	Let's Hang On	Philips 40317	July 1965	September 1965	15	1.00	US Billboard 1965 No. 17, Hot 100 No. 3 for 1 week, 16 total weeks, 146 points
18	Simon and Garfunkel	"The Sound of Silence"	Columbia 4-43396	March 10, 1964 + June 1965	September 13, 1965	11	1.25	US Billboard 1965 No. 18, Hot 100 No. 1 for 2 weeks, 14 total weeks, 139 points, Grammy Hall of Fame 1998, National Recording Registry 2012
19	The McCoys	"Hang On Sloopy"	Bang 506	May 1965	July 1965	18	1.00	US 1965 No. 19, Hot 100 No. 1 for 1 week, 14 total weeks, 138 points
20	The Byrds	"Mr. Tambourine Man"	Columbia 4-43271	January 20, 1965	April 12, 1965	21	1.25	US Billboard 1965 No. 20, Hot 100 No. 1 for 1 week, 13 total weeks, Grammy Hall of Fame 1998, 136 points
21	Barry McGuire	"Eve Of Destruction"	Dunhill 4009	July 15, 1965	July 26, 1965	25	1.75	US Billboard 1965 No. 21, Hot 100 No. 1 for 1 weeks, 10 total weeks, 132 points
22	The Beatles	Ticket to Ride	Capitol 5407	April 13, 1965	July 19, 1965	14	1.25	US Billboard 1965 No. 22, Hot 100 No. 1 for 1 weeks, 11 total weeks, 129 points
23	Herman's Hermits	"Can't You Hear My Heartbeat"	MGM 13367	December 1, 1964	December 12, 1964	40	1.50	US Billboard 1965 No. 23, Hot 100 No. 2 for 2 weeks, 15 total weeks, 128 points
24	James Brown and the Famous Flames	"I Got You (I Feel Good)"	King 6015	May 6, 1965	October 1965	26	1.75	US Billboard 1965 No. 24, Hot 100 No. 3 for 3 weeks, 12 total weeks, 127 points, Top Soul Singles 1965 No. 3, Hot Soul Singles No. 1 for 6 weeks, 16 total weeks, 295 points, Grammy Hall of Fame 2013
25	The Beatles	Eight Days a Week	Capitol 5371	October 18, 1964	February 1965	12	2.50	US Billboard 1965 No. 25, Hot 100 No. 1 for 2 weeks, 10 total weeks, 126 points
26	The Beach Boys	"California Girls"	Capitol 5395	February 24, 1965	April 5, 1965	46	1.50	US Billboard 1965 No. 26, Hot 100 No. 1 for 2 weeks, 14 total weeks, 124 points
27	Jay and the Americans	"Cara Mia"	United Artists 881	September 22, 1965	October 6, 1965	41	1.50	US Billboard 1965 No. 27, Hot 100 No. 1 for 1 week, 11 total weeks, 124 points
28	Freddie and the Dreamers	"I'm Telling You Now"	Tower 125	August 22, 1963	February 1965	23	1.75	US 1965 No. 28, Hot 100 No. 1 for 2 weeks, 12 total weeks, 123 points
29	Bob Dylan	"Like a Rolling Stone"	Columbia 43346	June 16, 1965	June 28, 1965	35	2.00	US Billboard 1965 No. 29, Hot 100 No. 2 for 2 weeks, 12 total weeks, 122 points, Grammy Hall of Fame 1998, Top Rock Tracks 1965 No. 2, from Highway 61 Revisted - Columbia 9189.
30	Roger Miller	"King Of The Road"	Smash 1965	November 1964	January 1965	20	2.00	US Billboard 1965 No. 30, Hot 100 No. 4 for 1 week, 13 total weeks, 122 points, Top Country Singles 1965 No. 6, Country Singles No. 1 for 5 weeks, 22 total weeks, 286 points, Top Easy Listening Singles 1965 No. 1, Easy Listening Singles No. 1 for 10 week, 13 total weeks, 339 points, Grammy Hall of Fame 2013
31	The Toys	"A Lover's Concerto"	DynoVoice 209	June 1965	August 1965	24	2.00	US Billboard 1965 No. 31, Hot 100 No. 2 for 3 weeks, 15 total weeks, 121 points
32	Len Barry	"1-2-3"	Decca 31827	September 22, 1965	October 6, 1965	30	1.00	US Billboard 1965 No. 32, Hot 100 No. 1 for 1 week, 11 total weeks, 121 points
33	Herman's Hermits	"I'm Henery the Eighth, I Am"	MGM 13367	February 1, 1965	June 1965	28	1.25	US Billboard 1965 No. 33, Hot 100 No. 1 for 1 weeks, 10 total weeks, 120 points
34	The Supremes	"Back in My Arms Again"	Motown 1135	September 22, 1965	October 6, 1965	36	1.00	US Billboard 1965 No. 34, Hot 100 No. 1 for 1 week, 11 total weeks, 119 points, Top Soul Singles 1965 No. 17, Hot Soul Singles No. 1 for 1 weeks, 11 total weeks, 142 points
35	Dave Clark Five	"Over And Over"	Epic 5-10045	September 1965	November 1965	27	1.00	US Billboard 1965 No. 35, Hot 100 No. 1 for 1 week, 12 total weeks, 118 points

== Billboard Top Soul Singles 1965 ==
1	The Four Tops	"I Can't Help Myself"						see number 2, from Four Tops Second Album - Motown 634.
2	James Brown and the Famous Flames	"Papa's Got a Brand New Bag"	King 5999	February 1965	June 1965	86	1.25	US Billboard 1965 No. 92, Hot 100 No. 8 for 2 weeks, 13 total weeks, Top Soul Singles 1965 No. 2, Hot Soul Singles No. 1 for 8 weeks, 17 total weeks, 314 points, from King single 5999.
3	James Brown and the Famous Flames	"I Got You (I Feel Good)"						see number 24, from King single 6015.
4	Wilson Pickett	"In the Midnight Hour"	Atlantic 2289	May 12, 1965	June 1965	209	1.25	US Billboard 1965 No. 190, Hot 100 No. 21 for 1 week, 12 total weeks, Top Soul Singles 1965 No. 4, Hot Soul Singles No. 1 for 1 week, 25 total weeks, 286 points, from In The Midnight Hour - Atlantic 8114.
5	The Temptations	"My Girl"						see number 12, from Gordy single 7033.

== Billboard Top Country Singles 1965 ==
1	Eddy Arnold	"What's He Doing in My World"	RCA Victor 8516	January 13, 1965	March 1965	536	1.00	US Billboard 1965 No. 438, Hot 100 No. 60 for 1 week, 9 total weeks, Top Country Singles 1965 No. 1, Country Singles No. 1 for 2 weeks, 25 total weeks, 313 points
2	Buck Owens	"Before You Go"	Capitol 5410	March 25, 1965	April 19, 1965	179	1.00	US Billboard 1965 No. 567, Hot 100 No. 83 for 1 week, 16 total weeks, 4 points, Top Country Singles 1965 No. 2, Country Singles No. 1 for 6 weeks, 20 total weeks, 311 points, Grammy Hall of Fame 1999, National Recording Registry 2010
3	Jim Reeves	"This Is It"	RCA Victor 8508	December 1964	February 1965	179	1.00	US Billboard 1965 No. 602, Hot 100 No. 88 for 1 week, 6 total weeks, Top Country Singles 1965 No. 3, Country Singles No. 1 for 3 weeks, 23 total weeks, 301 points
4	Buck Owens	"I've Got a Tiger By the Tail"	Capitol 5336	December 1, 1964	December 28, 1964	187	1.00	US Billboard 1965 No. 224, Hot 100 No. 25 for 3 weeks, 12 total weeks, Top Country Singles 1965 No. 4, Country Singles No. 1 for 5 weeks, 20 total weeks, 297 points, National Recording Registry 2003
5	Eddy Arnold	"Make the World Go Away"	RCA Victor 8679	June 22, 1965	October 1, 1965	226	2.00	US Billboard 1965 No. 89, Hot 100 No. 6 for 1 week, 11 total weeks, Top Country Singles 1965 No. 5, Country Singles No. 1 for 3 weeks, 25 total weeks, 289 points, Top Easy Listening Singles 1965 No. 5, Easy Listening Singles No. 1 for 4 weeks, 18 total weeks, 268 points, Grammy Hall of Fame 2004
6	Roger Miller	"King Of The Road"						see number 30

== Top Easy Listening Singles 1965 ==
1	Roger Miller	"King Of The Road"						see number 30
2	Herb Alpert And The Tijuana Brass	"A Taste of Honey"	A&M 775	March 10, 1965	August 1965	13	1.00	US Billboard 1965 No. 51, Hot 100 No. 7 for 2 weeks, 16 total weeks, 95 points, Top Easy Listening Singles 1965 No. 2, Easy Listening Singles No. 1 for 5 week, 21 total weeks, 309 points
3	We Five	"You Were on My Mind"	A&M 770	1965	June 1965	264	2.00	US Billboard 1965 No. 41, Hot 100 No. 3 for 1 weeks, 13 total weeks, Top Easy Listening Singles 1965 No. 3, Easy Listening Singles No. 1 for 5 weeks, 20 total weeks, 293 points
4	Elvis Presley	"Crying in the Chapel"	RCA Victor 447-0643	September 31, 1960	April 6, 1965	187	1.00	US Billboard 1965 No. 38, Hot 100 No. 3 for 1 week, 14 total weeks, 114 points, Top Easy Listening Singles 1965 No. 4, Easy Listening Singles No. 1 for 7 weeks, 13 total weeks, 288 points, National Recording Registry 2003
5	Eddy Arnold	"Make The World Go Away"						see Top Country Singles number 5

== Top Rock Tracks 1965 (unofficial) ==
1	The Rolling Stones	"(I Can't Get No) Satisfaction"						see number 1, from Out Of Our Heads - London 429.
2	Bob Dylan	"Like a Rolling Stone"						see number 29, from Highway 61 Revisted - Columbia 9189.
3	The Beach Boys	"Help Me, Rhonda"						see number 11, from All Summer Long - Capitol 2110.
4	The Lovin' Spoonful	"Do You Believe In Magic"	Kama Sutra 201	June 1965	July 20, 1965	87		Top Rock Tracks 1965 No. 4, US Billboard 1965 No. 78, Hot 100 No. 9 for 1 week, 13 total weeks, 66 points, from Do You Believe In Magic - Kama Sutra 8050.
5	Them	"Gloria"	Parrot 9727	July 5, 1964	December 2, 1964	654		Top Rock Tracks 1965 No. 5, US Billboard 1965 No. 636, Hot 100 No. 93 for 1 week, 1 total weeks, from Parrot single 9727
6	The Who	"I Can't Explain"	Decca 31725	November 1964	December 19, 1964	434		Top Rock Tracks 1965 No. 6, US Billboard 1965 No. 632, Hot 100 No. 93 for 1 week, 2 total weeks, from Decca single 31725
7	Bob Dylan	"Positively 4th Street"	Columbia 43389	July 29, 1965	September 7, 1965	103		Top Rock Tracks 1965 No. 7, US Billboard 1965 No. 80, Hot 100 No. 7 for 1 week, 9 total weeks, 63 points, from Columbia single 43389.
8	The Yardbirds	"Heart Full of Soul"	Epic 9823	June 19, 1965	July 2, 1965	127		Top Rock Tracks 1965 No. 8, US Billboard 1965 No. 79, Hot 100 No. 9 for 1 week, 12 total weeks, 65 points, from Having A Rave Up with The Yardbirds - Epic 26177.
9	The Beach Boys	"California Girls"						see number 26, from Summer Days (And Summer Nights!!) - Capitol 2354.
10	The Animals	"Don't Let Me Be Misunderstood"	MGM 13311	November 16, 1964	January 29, 1965	171	1.25	Top Rock Tracks 1965 No. 10, US Billboard 1965 No. 133, Hot 100 No. 15 for 1 week, 10 total weeks, 24 points, Top Rock Tracks 1965 No. 10, from Animal Tracks - MGM 4305.

== Top 5 biggest hits ==
#	Artist	Title	Year	Country	Chart Entries
1	The Rolling Stones	(I Can't Get No) Satisfaction	1965	(United Kingdom)	UK 1 – Aug 1965, US BB 1 – Jun 1965, Canada 1 – Jun 1965, Netherlands 1 – Aug 1965, Norway 1 – Aug 1965, Éire 1 – Sep 1965, 1 in 2FM list, DDD 1 of 1965, Europe 2 of the 1960s, Rolling Stone 2, Acclaimed 2, US CashBox 5 of 1965, Virgin 6, RYM 8 of 1965, RIAA 16, US BB 26 of 1965, POP 26 of 1965, Belgium 43 of all time, OzNet 48, Italy 62 of 1965, Germany 79 of the 1960s, Party 212 of 1999
2	The Byrds	Mr. Tambourine Man	1965	(United States)	
3	The Beatles	Help!	1965	(United Kingdom)	UK 1 – Jul 1965, US BB 1 – Aug 1965, Canada 1 – Jul 1965, Netherlands 1 – Aug 1965, Norway 1 – Aug 1965, Éire 1 – Aug 1965, Australia 1 for 3 weeks May 1965, Germany 2 – Aug 1965, Australia 5 of 1965, RYM 6 of 1965, South Africa 8 of 1965, US CashBox 11 of 1965, Europe 18 of the 1960s, Italy 24 of 1965, DDD 25 of 1965, Rolling Stone 29, Scrobulate 77 of classic rock, Acclaimed 134, Germany 143 of the 1960s, Belgium 193 of all time, OzNet 232, WXPN 427
4	The Beatles	Yesterday	1965	(United Kingdom)	US BB 1 – Oct 1965, Canada 1 – Sep 1965, Netherlands 1 – Oct 1965, Norway 1 – Nov 1965, Europe 5 of the 1960s, DDD 7 of 1965, UK 8 – Mar 1976, Germany 8 – Jan 1966, RYM 11 of 1965, Rolling Stone 13, Australia 14 of 1965, OzNet 14, US BB 25 of 1965, POP 25 of 1965, Virgin 33, Scrobulate 39 of classic rock, WXPN 48, TheQ 49, Poland 51 of all time, Belgium 53 of all time, RIAA 56, US CashBox 68 of 1965, Italy 88 of 1965, Acclaimed 117, Germany 373 of the 1960s
5	The Beatles	Ticket to Ride	1965	(United Kingdom)	UK 1 – Apr 1965, US BB 1 – May 1965, Canada 1 – Apr 1965, Netherlands 1 – Apr 1965, Norway 1 – Apr 1965, Éire 1 – Apr 1965, Australia 1 for 2 weeks Jan 1965, Germany 2 – May 1965, South Africa 3 of 1965, RYM 5 of 1965, DDD 9 of 1965, Scrobulate 16 of 60s, US CashBox 36 of 1965, Acclaimed 249, Germany 333 of the 1960s, Rolling Stone 384, WXPN 594, OzNet 613

== Other hits ==
- "Absent Friend" (Annorstädes vals) – Ingvar Wixell (w. Alf Henrikson m. Dag Wirén)
- "...and Roses and Roses" – Andy Williams
- "A Change Is Gonna Come" – Sam Cooke
- "A Little Bit of Heaven" – Ronnie Dove
- "A Must to Avoid" – Herman's Hermits
- "A Taste of Honey" – Herb Alpert and the Tijuana Brass
- "A World of Our Own" – The Seekers
- "Act Naturally" – The Beatles
- "Ain't That Peculiar" – Marvin Gaye
- "Aline" – Christophe
- "All Day and All of the Night" – The Kinks
- "All I Really Want to Do" – Cher
- "All I Really Want to Do" – The Byrds
- "Al's Place" – Al Hirt
- "Anyway, Anyhow, Anywhere" – The Who
- "Arrastão" – Elis Regina
- "Arriba en la Cordillera" – Patricio Manns
- "As Tears Go By" – Marianne Faithfull
- "As Tears Go By" – The Rolling Stones
- "Ask the Lonely" – Four Tops
- "At The Club" – The Drifters
- "Baby Don't Go" – Sonny & Cher
- "Baby, Please Don't Go" – Them
- "Baby the Rain Must Fall" – Glenn Yarbrough
- "Back in My Arms Again" – The Supremes
- "Barbara Ann" – The Beach Boys
- "The Birds and the Bees" – Jewel Akens
- "The Boy from New York City" – The Ad Libs
- "Bring It On Home to Me" – The Animals
- "Buon Natale/Stella d'oriente" – Mario Trevi
- "Bye Bye Baby" – The Four Seasons
- "California Dreamin'" – The Mamas & the Papas
- "Can't You Hear My Heartbeat" – Herman's Hermits
- "Capri c'est fini" – Hervé Vilard
- "Cara Mia" – Jay and the Americans
- "The Carnival Is Over" – The Seekers
- "Cast Your Fate to the Wind" – Sounds Orchestral
- "Catch the Wind" – Donovan
- "Catch Us If You Can" – The Dave Clark Five
- "Cheremshyna" – Dmytro Hnatyuk (w. Mykola Yuriychuk m. Vasyl Mykhailyuk)
- "The Clapping Song" – Shirley Ellis
- "Come See About Me" – The Supremes
- "Concrete and Clay" – Unit 4 + 2
- "Count Me In" – Gary Lewis & the Playboys
- "Crazy Downtown" – Allan Sherman
- "Crying in the Chapel" – Elvis Presley
- "Dance, Dance, Dance" – The Beach Boys
- "Day Tripper" – The Beatles
- "Do the Clam" – Elvis Presley
- "Do-Wacka-Do" – Roger Miller
- "Do You Wanna Dance?" – The Beach Boys
- "Don't Mess With Bill" – The Marvelettes
- "Down in the Boondocks" – Billy Joe Royal
- "È frennesia!/'Na catena 'e lacreme" – Mario Trevi
- "Ebb Tide" – The Righteous Brothers
- "Een meisje van 16" – Boudewijn de Groot
- "Eight Days a Week" – The Beatles
- "England Swings" – Roger Miller
- "Era de maggio/Qui fu Napoli" – Mario Trevi
- "Eve of Destruction" – Barry McGuire
- "Everybody Loves a Clown" – Gary Lewis and the Playboys
- "Everyone's Gone to the Moon" – Jonathan King
- "Evil Hearted You" – The Yardbirds
- "Fancy Pants" – Al Hirt
- "Ferry Cross The Mersey" – Gerry & the Pacemakers
- "Fever" – The McCoys
- "Flamenco" – Los Brincos
- "Five O'Clock World" -The Vogues
- "For Your Love" – The Yardbirds
- "Game of Love" – Wayne Fontana and the Mindbenders
- "Get Off of My Cloud" – The Rolling Stones
- "Girl Come Running" – The Four Seasons
- "Go Now" – The Moody Blues
- "Goin' Out of My Head" – Little Anthony & The Imperials
- "Going to a Go-Go" – Smokey Robinson and the Miracles
- "Goldfinger" – Shirley Bassey
- "Got to Get You Off My Mind" – Solomon Burke
- "Hang on Sloopy" – The McCoys
- "Hasta Siempre, Comandante" – Carlos Puebla
- "Heart of Stone" – The Rolling Stones
- "Here Comes the Night" – Them
- "Hold Me, Thrill Me, Kiss Me" – Mel Carter
- "How Sweet It Is (To Be Loved By You)" – Marvin Gaye
- "Hurt So Bad" – Little Anthony & The Imperials
- "I Can Never Go Home Anymore" – The Shangri-Las
- "I Do Love You" – Billy Stewart
- "I Feel Fine" – The Beatles
- "I Got You (I Feel Good)" – James Brown
- "I Got You Babe" – Sonny & Cher
- "I Hear a Symphony" – The Supremes
- "I Knew You When" – Billy Joe Royal
- "I Know a Place" – Petula Clark
- "I Like It Like That" – The Dave Clark Five
- "I Want Candy" – The Strangeloves
- "I'll Be Doggone" – Marvin Gaye
- "I'll Never Find Another You" – The Seekers
- "I'm a Man" – The Yardbirds
- "I'm Afraid They're All Talking About Me"- Dawn
- "I'm Gonna Destroy That Boy"- The What Four
- "I'm Henry VIII, I Am" – Herman's Hermits
- "I'm Telling You Now" – Freddie and the Dreamers
- "Iko Iko" – The Dixie Cups
- "Il Silenzio" – Nini Rosso (instrumental with spoken lyrics) – Nini Rosso and Guglielmo Brezza
- "The 'In' Crowd" – Dobie Gray
- "In the Midnight Hour" – Wilson Pickett
- "It Ain't Me Babe" – The Turtles
- "It's Gonna Be Fine" – Glenn Yarbrough
- "It's Growing" – The Temptations
- "It's My Life" – The Animals
- "It's Not Unusual" – Tom Jones
- "It's the Same Old Song" – Four Tops
- "I've Got to Be Somebody" – Billy Joe Royal
- "Jacky" w.m. Jacques Brel
- "Jaan Pehechan Ho" – Mohammed Rafi (w. Anand Bakshi m. Shankar Jaikishan)
- "The Jerk" – The Larks
- "The Jolly Green Giant" – The Kingsmen
- "Just a Little" – The Beau Brummels
- "Just a Little Bit Better" – Herman's Hermits
- "Just Once In My Life" – The Righteous Brothers
- "King of the Road" – Roger Miller
- "Kiss Away" – Ronnie Dove
- "La Bohème" – Charles Aznavour
- "Land of a Thousand Dances" – Cannibal and the Headhunters
- "The Last Time" – The Rolling Stones
- "Laugh, Laugh" – The Beau Brummels
- "Laurie (Strange Things Happen)" – Dickie Lee
- "Lemon Tree" – Trini Lopez
- "Les Choses de la Maison" – Claude François
- "Letkiss" (Several versions)
- "Let's Hang On" – The Four Seasons
- "Let's Lock the Door (And Throw Away the Key)" – Jay and the Americans
- "Liar, Liar" – The Castaways
- "Lies – The Knickerbockers
- "Like a Rolling Stone" – Bob Dylan
- "The Little Girl I Once Knew" – The Beach Boys
- "Looking Through the Eyes of Love" – Gene Pitney
- "Love Potion#9" – The Searchers
- "A Lover's Concerto" – The Toys
- "Make the World Go Away" – Eddy Arnold
- "Mbraccia a me!/Core furastiero" – Mario Trevi
- "Mr. Lonely" – Bobby Vinton
- "My Baby" – The Temptations
- "My Generation" – The Who
- "My Girl" – The Temptations
- "My Love" – Petula Clark
- "My World Is Empty Without You" – The Supremes
- "The Name Game" – Shirley Ellis
- "Niente cchiù/'A voce 'e ll'ammore" – Mario Trevi
- "Non, à jamais sans toi" – Yovanna (w. Jean Charles m. Bob Calfati)
- "Nothing but Heartaches" – The Supremes
- "Nowhere to Run" – Martha and the Vandellas
- "One Kiss for Old Times' Sake" – Ronnie Dove
- "Ooo Baby Baby" – Smokey Robinson and the Miracles
- "Over and Over" – The Dave Clark Five
- "Papa's Got a Brand New Bag" – James Brown
- "Quiet Nights of Quiet Stars (Corcovado)" – Andy Williams
- "The Race Is On" – Jack Jones
- "Red Roses for a Blue Lady" – Bert Kaempfert
- "Red Roses for a Blue Lady" – Vic Dana
- "Remember When (We Made These Memories)" – Wayne Newton
- "Rescue Me" – Fontella Bass
- "Respect" – Otis Redding
- "Run, Baby Run (Back Into My Arms)" – The Newbeats
- "Rusty Bells" – Brenda Lee
- "Save Your Heart for Me" – Gary Lewis and the Playboys
- "Schenk Mir ein Bild von Dir" – Peter Alexander
- "Second Hand Rose" – Barbra Streisand
- "See My Friends" – The Kinks
- "See Saw" – Don Covay
- "Send Me the Pillow You Dream On" – Dean Martin
- "Set Me Free" – The Kinks
- "Sulo e senza 'e te/Catenella" – Mario Trevi
- "Seventh Son" – Johnny Rivers
- "Sha La La" – Manfred Mann
- "Shakin' All Over" – The Guess Who
- "She's a Woman" – The Beatles
- "She's Just My Style" – Gary Lewis and the Playboys
- "Shotgun" – Jr. Walker & The All Stars
- "The Silence (Il Silenzio)" – Al Hirt
- "Silhouettes" – Herman's Hermits
- "Since I Lost My Baby" – The Temptations
- "Sitting in the Park" – Billy Stewart
- "Some Enchanted Evening" – Jay and the Americans
- "Te voglio bene assaje/Dicitencello vuje" – Mario Trevi
- "The Sound of Silence" – Simon & Garfunkel
- "Spanish Flea" – Herb Alpert and the Tijuana Brass
- "Subterranean Homesick Blues" – Bob Dylan
- "Sunday and Me" – Jay and the Americans
- "Sunshine, Lollipops, and Rainbows" – Lesley Gore
- "Supercalifragilisticexpialidocious" – Julie Andrews, Dick Van Dyke and The Pearls
- "Sweet Talkin' Guy"- The Chiffons
- "Take Me Back" – Little Anthony & The Imperials
- "Tears" – Ken Dodd
- "Tell Her No" – The Zombies
- "This Diamond Ring" – Gary Lewis and the Playboys
- "Thunderball" – Tom Jones
- "Till the End of the Day" – The Kinks
- "Tired of Waiting for You" – The Kinks
- "The Tracks of My Tears" – Smokey Robinson and the Miracles
- "Treat Her Right" – Roy Head and the Traits
- "Truly, Truly True" – Brenda Lee
- "Unchained Melody" – The Righteous Brothers
- "Universal Soldier" – Donovan
- "Va t'en, va t'en" – Dick Rivers
- "We Can Work It Out" – The Beatles
- "We Gotta Get Out of This Place" – The Animals
- "A Well Respected Man" – The Kinks
- "What Have They Done to the Rain" – The Searchers
- "What the World Needs Now Is Love" – Jackie DeShannon
- "What's New, Pussycat?" – Tom Jones
- "With These Hands" – Tom Jones
- "Wonderful World" – Herman's Hermits
- "Yes, I'm Ready" – Barbara Mason
- "Yes It Is" – The Beatles
- "You Didn't Have to Be So Nice" – The Lovin' Spoonful
- "You Turn Me On" – Ian Whitcomb
- "You Were Made for Me" – Freddie and the Dreamers
- "You Were On My Mind" – We Five
- "You're the One" – The Vogues
- "You've Got to Hide Your Love Away" – The Silkie
- "You've Got Your Troubles" – The Fortunes
- "Zorba the Greek" – Herb Alpert and the Tijuana Brass

== Published popular music ==
- "Call Me" w.m. Tony Hatch
- "The Carnival Is Over" w. Tom Springfield
- "Do I Hear a Waltz?" w. Stephen Sondheim m. Richard Rodgers. Introduced by Elizabeth Allen in the musical Do I Hear a Waltz?.
- "Girl Talk" w. Bobby Troup m. Neal Hefti from the film Harlow
- "Goldfinger" w. Leslie Bricusse & Anthony Newley m. John Barry. Introduced by Shirley Bassey on the soundtrack of the film Goldfinger
- "Honey Come Back" w.m. Jimmy Webb
- "I Have Confidence" w.m. Richard Rodgers, from the film The Sound of Music
- "I Know a Place" w.m. Tony Hatch
- "The Impossible Dream" w. Joe Darion m. Mitch Leigh Introduced by Richard Kiley in the musical Man of La Mancha
- "Jeannie" w.m. Hugo Montenegro and Buddy Kaye, theme from the TV series I Dream of Jeannie
- "Michelle" w.m. John Lennon & Paul McCartney
- "Moment to Moment" w. Johnny Mercer m. Henry Mancini from the film Moment to Moment
- "On a Clear Day (You Can See Forever)" w. Alan Jay Lerner m. Burton Lane introduced by John Cullum in the musical On a Clear Day You Can See Forever. Performed in the 1970 film version by Yves Montand.
- "The Shadow of Your Smile" w. Paul Francis Webster m. Johnny Mandel
- "She Touched Me" w. Ira Levin m. Milton Schafer. Introduced by Elliott Gould in the musical Drat! The Cat!
- "Somewhere My Love" Paul Francis Webster m. Maurice Jarre from Doctor Zhivago
- "Spanish Flea" m. Julius Wechter
- "What The World Needs Now Is Love". Hal David m. Burt Bacharach
- "What's New Pussycat?" w. Hal David m. Burt Bacharach from the film What's New Pussycat?
- "Who Can I Turn To?" w.m. Leslie Bricusse & Anthony Newley from the musical The Roar of the Greasepaint – The Smell of the Crowd
- "A World of Our Own" w.m. Tom Springfield
- "(On A) Wonderful Day Like Today" w.m. Leslie Bricusse & Anthony Newley from the musical The Roar of the Greasepaint – The Smell of the Crowd

== Classical music ==
=== Premieres ===
Sortable table
Composer	Composition	Date	Location	Performers
Chávez, Carlos	Tambuco for 6 percussionists	1965-10-11	(United States) Los Angeles County Museum of Art	Los Angeles Percussion Ensemble – Kraft
Chávez, Carlos	Soli III for bassoon, trumpet, viola, timpani, and orchestra	1965-11-24	(Germany) SWR, Baden-Baden	Southwest German Radio Symphony Orchestra – Chávez
Pousseur, Henri	Miroir de Votre Faust (Caractères II) for piano with soprano ad libitum	1965–??-??	(West Germany) Berlin	Rzewski
Stockhausen, Karlheinz	Mikrophonie II for choir, Hammond organ and four ring modulators	1965-06-11	(West Germany) Cologne (WDR, Musik der Zeit)	WDR Choir, Alfons Kontarsky, Fritsch – Schernus

=== Compositions ===
- Gilbert Biberian – Greek Suite for guitar
- Pierre Boulez - Éclat for ensemble
- Carlos Chávez – Soli III for bassoon, trumpet, timpani, viola, and orchestra
- George Crumb
  - Madrigals, Books I for soprano, vibraphone, and double bass
  - Madrigals, Books II for soprano, flute/alto flute/piccolo, and percussion
- Mario Davidovsky – Inflexions for chamber ensemble
- Henri Dutilleux – Résonances for piano
- Roberto Gerhard – Concerto for Orchestra
- Vittorio Giannini – Symphony no. 5
- Wojciech Kilar – Springfield Sonnet for orchestra
- Jan Klusák
  - Rejdovák for bass clarinet, viola and double bass
  - Sonata for String and Wind Instruments
  - Fantaisie lyrique
- György Ligeti – Requiem for Soprano and Mezzo Soprano solo, mixed Chorus and Orchestra (1963–65)
- Henri Pousseur
  - Miroir de Votre Faust (Caractères II) for piano with soprano ad libitum
  - Jeu de Miroirs de Votre Faust for piano, soprano ad libitum, and two-channel tape
- Karlheinz Stockhausen – Mikrophonie II
- Eduard Tubin – Sonata for viola and piano

== Opera ==
- Jack Beeson – Lizzie Borden, March 25, New York City Opera
- Ned Rorem – Miss Julie, November 4, New York City Opera

== Film ==
- Burt Bacharach - What's New Pussycat?
- John Barry - The Ipcress File
- John Barry - Thunderball
- Benjamin Frankel - Battle of the Bulge
- Ernest Gold - Ship of Fools
- Jerry Goldsmith - A Patch of Blue
- Ron Goodwin - Those Magnificent Men in Their Flying Machines
- Maurice Jarre - Doctor Zhivago
- Henry Mancini - The Great Race
- Johnny Mandel - The Sandpiper
- Alex North - The Agony and the Ecstasy
- Lalo Schifrin - The Cincinnati Kid

== Musical theater ==
- Baker Street Broadway production opened at The Broadway Theatre and ran for 311 performances
- Carousel (Rodgers & Hammerstein) – Broadway revival
- Charlie Girl London production opened at the Adelphi Theatre on December 15.
- Do I Hear A Waltz? (Richard Rodgers and Stephen Sondheim) – Broadway production opened at the 46th Street Theatre and ran for 220 performances
- Drat! The Cat! – Broadway production opened at the Martin Beck Theatre and ran for 8 performances
- Flora the Red Menace (Music: John Kander Lyrics: Fred Ebb) Broadway production opened on May 11 and ran for 87 performances. Starring Liza Minnelli.
- Half a Sixpence – Broadway production opened at the Broadhurst Theatre and ran for 511 performances
- Hello, Dolly! (Jerry Herman) – London production
- Man of La Mancha (Joe Darion and Mitch Leigh) – Broadway production opened at the Martin Beck Theatre and ran for 2,328 performances. The show won five Tony Awards
- On a Clear Day You Can See Forever – Broadway production opened at the Mark Hellinger Theatre and ran for 280 performances
- Pickwick – Broadway production opened at the 46th Street Theatre and ran for 56 performances
- The Roar of the Greasepaint – The Smell of the Crowd – Broadway production opened at the Schubert Theatre and ran for 231 performances
- Twang! (Music, Lyrics and Book: Lionel Bart) London production opened at the Shaftesbury Theatre on December 20.

== Musical films ==
- Bangaru Panjaram, Telugu musical drama
- Funny Things Happen Down Under, Australia/New Zealand co-production starring Olivia Newton-John
- Help!, directed by Richard Lester, starring The Beatles
- Inside the Forbidden City, Hong Kong musical opera film
- Janwar, Hindi film
- Malangi, Pakistani film in Punjabi, with music by Master Abdullah
- Samba, Brazilian-Spanish co-production starring Sara Montiel, Marc Michel and Fosco Giachetti
- The Sound of Music directed by Robert Wise, starring Julie Andrews and Christopher Plummer
- Waqt, Hindi film
- When the Boys Meet the Girls, starring Connie Francis

== Births ==
- January 4
  - Beth Gibbons, English singer-songwriter, British vocalist (Portishead and Rustin Man)
  - David Glasper, British vocalist Breathe
- January 7
  - John Ondrasik (or Five for Fighting), American singer-songwriter and pianist
  - Chris Kempers, German singer
- January 9 – Haddaway, Trinidadian-German singer, songwriter and musician
- January 12 – Rob Zombie, American musician, filmmaker and screenwriter and heavy metal musician (White Zombie)
- January 14 – Slick Rick, English rapper
- January 15 – Adam Jones, American guitarist and songwriter (Tool and Electric Sheep)
- January 20
  - Greg K. (The Offspring)
  - Heather Small, British soul singer (M People)
- January 22
  - Steven Adler (Guns N' Roses)
  - DJ Jazzy Jeff, American rapper and actor
- January 25 – Toni Halliday, lead singer and bass guitarist of Curve and Photofitz
- January 26 – Siavash Shams, Iranian singer
- February 7 – Chris Rock, American comedian, actor and filmmaker
- February 9 – Stephin Merritt from The Magnetic Fields
- February 12 – Mia Frye, American actress, singer, professional dancer, and dance choreographer
- February 15 – Olaf Jeglitza, German singer (Real McCoy)
- February 18 – Dr. Dre, American rapper, record producer, and entrepreneur
- February 20 – Inna Zhelannaya, Russian singer-songwriter
- February 25
  - Brian Baker of Minor Threat, the Meatmen and Bad Religion
  - Maricel Soriano, Filipino actress and television personality
- February 27 – Frank Peter Zimmermann, German violinist
- March 4
  - Andrew Collins, British radio DJ and journalist
  - WestBam (Maximillian Lenz), German DJ
- March 7 – Jean-Pierre Barda, Swedish-Israeli singer (Army of Lovers)
- March 12 – Liza Umarova, Chechen singer and actress
- March 18 – Yvonne Chaka Chaka, South African singer
- March 22 – Ice MC, British rapper
- March 23 – Marti Pellow, Scottish vocalist (Wet Wet Wet)
- March 24 – Patrick Scales, British-German electric bass guitar player
- April 1 – Robert Steadman, English composer
- April 3 – Nazia Hassan, Pakistani pop singer (d. 2000)
- April 6 – Black Francis, vocalist, songwriter, and guitarist (Pixies)
- April 12 – Pinchers, reggae/dancehall artist
- April 15 – Linda Perry, American singer-songwriter and record producer.
- April 16 – Martin Lawrence, American actor and comedian
- April 18 – Vinnie Moore, guitarist
- April 19
  - Suge Knight, American record producer
  - Natalie Dessay, French soprano
- April 23 – Tommy DeCarlo, vocalist (Boston)
- April 25 – Eric Avery (Jane's Addiction)
- May 1 – Helen Darling, American country singer
- May 3 – Tony Wegas, Austrian singer and actor
- May 6 – Maria Doyle-Cuche, Irish singer
- May 7 – Chris O'Connor, vocalist and guitarist (Primitive Radio Gods)
- May 13 – Tasmin Little, English violinist
- May 16 – Krist Novoselic, Croatian-American bassist (Nirvana)
- May 17 – Trent Reznor, American singer, songwriter, musician, record producer, and film score composer (Nine Inch Nails)
- May 22 – Catie Curtis, American singer-songwriter
- May 23 – Simon Gilbert, English drummer (Suede)
- May 28 – Chris Ballew, American rock musician (The Presidents of the United States of America)
- May 31
  - Lisa I'Anson, British DJ
  - DJ Casper, American musician (d. 2023)
- June 5 – Tyler Bates, American musician, music producer, and composer for films, television, and video games (Zack Snyder, Sucker Punch, Marilyn Manson, Marius de Vries, Guardians of the Galaxy)
- June 7
  - Jean-Pierre François, French footballer and singer
  - Christine Roque, French singer
- June 10
  - Joey Santiago (Pixies)
- June 12 – Little Louie Vega, American disc jockey, record producer and remixer (Masters at Work)
- June 16 – Darja Švajger, Slovak singer
- June 19 – Sean Marshall, American child actor and singer
- June 21 – Sonique, English singer, musician and DJ
- June 23 – Paul Arthurs, English musician (Oasis)
- June 28 – Sonny Strait, American voice actor and singer
- June 29 - Tripp Eisen, American Musician
- July 4 – Jo Whiley, British radio DJ
- July 5 – Eyran Katsenelenbogen, Israeli jazz pianist
- July 9
  - Frank Bello (Anthrax)
  - Tom Hingley, English singer, songwriter and guitarist (Inspiral Carpets)
- July 13
  - Akina Nakamori, Japanese pop singer
  - Eileen Ivers, American fiddler (Cherish the Ladies)
- July 19 – Evelyn Glennie, Scottish percussionist
- July 23
  - Rob Dickinson, English singer-songwriter and guitarist (Catherine Wheel)
  - Slash, guitarist (Guns N' Roses, Velvet Revolver)
- July 28
  - Daniela Mercury, Brazilian singer
  - Priscilla Chan, Hong Kong singer
  - Nick Banks, English drummer (Pulp)
- August 6
  - Ravi Coltrane, American saxophonist
  - Yuki Kajiura, Japanese composer
- August 10 – Toumani Diabaté, Malian kora player (d. 2024)
- August 12 – Bon Harris, English singer, songwriter, composer and multi-instrumentalist (Nitzer Ebb)
- August 14 – Mark Collins, English guitarist (the Charlatans)
- August 16 – Jari Sillanpää, Finnish singer
- August 18 – Koji Kikkawa, Japanese singer
- August 19 – Johan Botha, South African operatic tenor (d. 2016)
- August 20
  - Wise, American rapper (Stetsasonic)
  - KRS-One, American rapper (Boogie Down Productions)
- August 24 – Marlee Matlin, American actress
- August 26 – Annie Holland, English musician (Elastica)
- August 27 – E-Type, Swedish musician songwriter and record producer
- August 28 – Shania Twain, Canadian country-pop singer-songwriter and performer
- August 29 – Frances Ruffelle, English actress and singer
- September 1 – Craig McLachlan, Australian actor and singer
- September 3 – Todd Lewis, (Toadies)
- September 7 – Angela Gheorghiu, Romanian soprano
- September 7 – Paolo Tortiglione, Italian Composer and musicologist
- September 9 – Jesús Vázquez, Spanish television presenter
- September 11 – Moby, American musician
- September 12 – Norwood Fisher, Fishbone
- September 13 – Zak Starkey, drummer, son of Ringo Starr
- September 16 – Stephen Shareaux, American singer-songwriter (Kik Tracee and Zen From Mars)
- September 23 – Marco Blaauw, trumpeter (musikFabrik)
- September 26 – Cindy Herron, American singer (En Vogue)
- October 2 – David D'Or, Israeli singer, composer and songwriter
- October 8 – C.J. Ramone, bassist (Ramones)
- October 14
  - Constantine Koukias, Australian composer
  - Karyn White, American R&B singer and songwriter
- October 18 – Curtis Stigers, American jazz musician and singer
- October 20
  - Jil Caplan, French singer and songwriter
  - Norman Blake, Scottish singer/songwriter (Teenage Fanclub)
- October 22 – John Wesley Harding, singer
- October 25 – Luis Jara, Chilean singer, television host and actor
- October 26
  - Aaron Kwok, Hong Kong singer and actor
  - Sakari Oramo, Finnish conductor
- October 29 - Peter Timmins, Canadian drummer (Cowboy Junkies)
- October 30 – Gavin Rossdale, English musician (Gwen Stefani)
- November 2 – Shahrukh Khan, Indian actor
- November 4
  - Pata, Japanese rock guitarist (X Japan)
  - Jeff Scott Soto, American musician
  - Wayne Static, American rock singer (Static-X)
- November 8 – Craig Chester, American actor
- November 9 – Bryn Terfel, Welsh bass-baritone
- November 10 – Jonas Åkerlund, Swedish music video director and drummer
- November 14
  - Jeanette Jurado, American singer (Exposé)
  - Ron "Amen-Ra" Lawrence, American record producer
- November 16 – Magnus Bäcklund, Swedish singer (Fame)
- November 20 – Yoshiki, Japanese composer, pianist, and drummer (X Japan)
- November 21
  - Björk, Icelandic singer, songwriter, musician, businesswomen, record producer, and DJ
  - Gabrielle Glaser (Luscious Jackson)
- November 18 – Tim DeLaughter, American singer-songwriter (Tripping Daisy and The Polyphonic Spree)
- November 22 – Sen Dog (Cypress Hill)
- November 24 – Angelika Kirchschlager, Austrian opera singer (mezzo-soprano)
- November 25 – Tim Armstrong, American singer and musician (Rancid)
- November 29 - Yutaka Ozaki, Japanese singer and musician (d. 1992)
- December 5
  - Gary Didier Perez, Haitian compas singer (d. 2025)
  - John Rzeznik, American rock singer (Goo Goo Dolls)
- December 8 – Easy Mo Bee, American DJ and record producer
- December 12 – Russell Batiste Jr., American funk and R&B drummer (d. 2023)
- December 13 – Kristiane Backer, German-English television presenter, journalist and author
- December 23 – Bobby Schayer, American drummer (Bad Religion)
- December 27 – Salman Khan, Indian actor
- December 29 – Dexter Holland, American rock singer (The Offspring)
- Date unknown
  - Kepa Junkera, Basque accordionist and composer
  - Joakim Sundström, Swedish sound editor, sound designer and musician
  - Sonja Yelich, New Zealand poet and mother of singer-songwriters, Lorde and Indy Yelich.

== Deaths ==
- 11 January – Arne Bjørndal, Norwegian hardingfele fiddler, composer and folklorist, 82
- January 13 – Leo Funtek, violinist, conductor and arranger, 79
- January 14 – Jeanette MacDonald, singer and actress, 61
- January 20 – Alan Freed, DJ who first used the phrase Rock and Roll, 43
- January 21 – Reino Helismaa, singer-songwriter
- February 2 – Charles W. Harrison, ballad singer, 86
- February 7 – Viggo Brodersen, pianist and composer, 85
- February 14 – Désiré-Émile Inghelbrecht, conductor and composer, 84
- February 15 – Nat King Cole, singer and pianist, 45
- February 25 – Leo Sirota, pianist
- March 2 – Ján Valašťan Dolinský, composer
- March 4 – Asadata Dafora, drummer
- March 8 – Tadd Dameron, jazz pianist and composer, 48
- March 22 – Harry Tierney, musical theatre composer
- March 29 – Zlatko Baloković, violinist, 70
- April 7 – David Hellström, songwriter, 81
- April 12 – La Belle Otero, dancer and courtesan
- April 26 – Michael Bohnen, operatic bass-baritone and actor, 77
- May 1 – Spike Jones, comedy musician, 53
- May 14 – Joe Sanders, jazz pianist, singer and bandleader, 68
- June 18 – George Melachrino, English conductor, singer and composer
- July 8 – Willie Dennis, jazz trombonist, 39
- July 14 – Spencer Williams, pianist, singer and composer
- July 17 – Frank Ryan, tenor, 65
- September 4 – Albert Schweitzer, missionary, musician, and author on Bach
- September 8 – Dorothy Dandridge, actress and singer, 42
- September 9 – Julián Carrillo, Mexican composer, conductor, violinist and music theorist, 90
- September 10 – Bobby Jordan, actor and musician, 42
- September 15 – Steve Brown, jazz musician
- September 25 – Nikolai Sokoloff, violinist and conductor, 79
- October 21 – Bill Black, US musician, 39
- October 25 – Hans Knappertsbusch, German conductor, 77
- October 27 – Peter La Farge, folk singer-songwriter, 34
- November 6
  - Edgard Varèse, French composer, 81
  - Clarence Williams, jazz musician and composer, 67
- November 18 – Lou Black, banjo player, 64
- November 19 – Joe Falcon, Cajun accordionist, 65
- November 21
  - Cecil Brower, jazz violinist, 50 (perforated ulcer)
  - Naoum Blinder, violinist and teacher born in Ukraine, 76 (if born July 19, 1889, per some sources)
- November 25 – Dame Myra Hess, pianist, 75
- December 3 – Hank D'Amico, jazz and swing musician
- December 10 – Henry Cowell, composer
- December 11 – Rafael Hernández Marín, composer, 73
- December 16 – Tito Schipa, tenor, 76
- December 20 – Charlie Burse, blues musician, 64
- date unknown – Craig Campbell, operatic tenor, 77

== Awards ==
=== Grammy Awards ===
- Grammy Awards of 1965

=== Eurovision Song Contest ===
- Eurovision Song Contest 1965

== See also ==
- List of Billboard Hot 100 number ones of 1965
