= List of number-one hits of 1965 (Mexico) =

This is a list of the songs that reached number one in Mexico in 1965, according to Billboard magazine with data provided by Audiomusica.

== Chart History ==
Issue date	Song	Artist(s)	Ref.
January 2	"La pollera colorá"	Carmen Rivero y su Conjunto	
January 9	"And I Love Her"	Santo & Johnny	
January 16	"And I Love Her"	Santo & Johnny	
January 23	"And I Love Her"	Santo & Johnny	
January 30	"And I Love Her"	Santo & Johnny	
February 6	"And I Love Her"	Santo & Johnny	
February 13	"And I Love Her"	Santo & Johnny	
February 20	"La pollera colorá"	Carmen Rivero y su Conjunto	
February 27	"La pollera colorá"	Carmen Rivero y su Conjunto	
March 6	"La pollera colorá"	Carmen Rivero y su Conjunto	
March 13	"And I Love Her"	Santo & Johnny	
March 20	"And I Love Her"	Santo & Johnny	
March 27	"And I Love Her"	Santo & Johnny	
April 3	"And I Love Her"	Santo & Johnny	
April 10	"And I Love Her"	Santo & Johnny	
April 17	"And I Love Her"	Santo & Johnny	
April 24	"And I Love Her"	Santo & Johnny	
May 1	"And I Love Her"	Santo & Johnny	
May 8	"And I Love Her"	Santo & Johnny	
May 22	"El mudo"	Sonora Santanera	
May 29	"Sombras"	Javier Solís	
June 5	"Sombras"	Javier Solís	
June 19	"Sombras"	Javier Solís	
June 26	"Sombras"	Javier Solís	
July 3	"Sombras"	Javier Solís	
July 10	"Sombras"	Javier Solís	
July 17	"Sombras"	Javier Solís	
July 24	"Sombras"	Javier Solís	
July 31	"Sombras"	Javier Solís	
August 7	"Sombras"	Javier Solís	
August 14	"Sombras"	Javier Solís	
August 21	"Sombras"	Javier Solís	
August 28	"Woolly Bully"	Sam the Sham and the Pharaohs	
September 4	"Woolly Bully"	Sam the Sham and the Pharaohs	
September 11	"Woolly Bully"	Sam the Sham and the Pharaohs/Los Rockin' Devils (Note: Their version of the song was titled "Bule Bule".)	
September 18	"Woolly Bully"	Sam the Sham and the Pharaohs/Los Rockin' Devils	
September 25	"Woolly Bully"	Sam the Sham and the Pharaohs/Los Rockin' Devils	
October 2	"Woolly Bully"	Sam the Sham and the Pharaohs/Los Rockin' Devils	
October 9	"Woolly Bully"	Sam the Sham and the Pharaohs/Los Rockin' Devils	
October 16	"Woolly Bully"	Sam the Sham and the Pharaohs/Los Rockin' Devils	
October 23	"Woolly Bully"	Sam the Sham and the Pharaohs/Los Rockin' Devils	
October 30	"Woolly Bully"	Sam the Sham and the Pharaohs/Los Rockin' Devils	
November 6	"Payaso"	Javier Solís	
November 13	"Woolly Bully"	Sam the Sham and the Pharaohs/Los Rockin' Devils	
November 20	"¡Qué va!"/"(Se te olvida) La mentira"	Javier Solís with Mariachi Jalisco de Pepe Villa	
November 27	"¡Qué va!"/"(Se te olvida) La mentira"	Javier Solís with Mariachi Jalisco de Pepe Villa	
December 4	"¡Qué va!"/"(Se te olvida) La mentira"	Javier Solís with Mariachi Jalisco de Pepe Villa	
December 11	"Es Lupe"	Los Johnny Jets	
December 18	"Es Lupe"	Los Johnny Jets	
December 25	"Es Lupe"	Los Johnny Jets	

=== By country of origin ===
Number-one artists:

Country of origin	Number of artists	Artists
Mexico	5	Carmen Rivero y su Conjunto
Mexico	5	Sonora Santanera
Mexico	5	Javier Solís
Mexico	5	Los Rockin' Devils
Mexico	5	Los Johnny Jets
United States	2	Santo & Johnny
United States	2	Sam the Sham & The Pharaohs

Number-one compositions (it denotes the country of origin of the song's composer[s]; in case the song is a cover of another one, the name of the original composition is provided in parentheses):

Country of origin	Number of compositions	Compositions
Mexico	4	"El mudo"
Mexico	4	"Payaso"
Mexico	4	"¡Qué va!"
Mexico	4	"Se te olvida (La mentira)"
United States	2	"Woolly Bully"
United States	2	"Es Lupe" ("Hang On Sloopy")
Argentina	1	"Sombras"
Colombia	1	"La pollera colorá"
United Kingdom	1	"And I Love Her"

== See also ==
- 1965 in music

== Sources ==
- Print editions of the Billboard magazine from January 9, 1965, to January 1, 1966.
