= Umarov =

Umarov (Russian: Умаров, Kazakh: Омаров) is a masculine surname common in the southern Muslim parts of the former Soviet Union, its feminine counterpart is Umarova. Notable people with the surname include:

- Akram Umarov (born 1994), Kyrgyzstani football player
- Otabek Umarov (born 1984) Uzbek civil servant and sports functionary.
- Dokka Umarov (1964–2013), Chechen militant
- Gadzhi Umarov (born 1985), Russian taekwondo practitioner
- Kairat Umarov (born 1963), Kazakh Ambassador to the United States
- Liza Umarova (born 1965), Chechen singer and actress
- Makhmud Umarov (1924–1961), Kazakhstani sport shooter
- Muhibullo Abdulkarim Umarov, Tajikistan citizen held in the Guantanamo Bay detainment camps
- Rizvan Umarov (born 1993), Azerbaijani football player
- Sanjar Umarov (born 1956), Uzbek politician and businessman
