= Bright Lights and Country Music (Rick Nelson album) =

Brights Lights and Country Music

Studio album by Rick Nelson
- Released: May 30, 1966
- Genre: Country
- Length: 29:37
- Label: Decca
- Producer: Charles "Bud" Dant

Rick Nelson chronology
| Love and Kisses (1965) | Brights Lights and Country Music (1966) | On the Flip Side (1966) |

Singles from Brights Lights and Country Music
- 1. "Louisiana Man"" Released: May 1966

Bright Lights and Country Music is a studio album by American singer Rick Nelson. Released on May 30, 1966, it was his seventh for Decca Records and fourteenth overall. Covering country classics such as "Hello Walls", "Night Train to Memphis" and "Welcome to My Word", and "Louisiana Man", the album was considered a significant change in direction for Nelson from the rock and roll of previous albums. Jimmie Haskell arranged the album and Charles "Bud" Dant produced it.

The album debuted on the Cashbox looking ahead albums chart in the issue dated June 25, 1966, and remained on the chart for two weeks, peaking at number 114.

"You Just Can't Quit" was the first song he wrote himself and released since "Don't Leave Me This Way" on his second album. "You Just Can't Quit" bubbled under Billboard's Hot 100, reaching number 108, number 76 on the Cashbox singles chart, and number 24 in Canada.

The album was released on compact disc by Ace Records on June 23, 1998, as tracks 1 through 12 on a pairing of two albums on one CD with tracks 13 through 24 consisting of Nelson's 1967 album, Country Fever. Bear Family included the album in the 2008 For You: The Decca Years box set.

== Critical reception ==
Professional ratings
Review scores
| Source | Rating |
|---|---|
| AllMusic | 2/5 stars |
| Billboard | 4/5 stars |
| The Encyclopedia of Popular Music | 4/5 stars |

Cashbox in its Pop Best Bets Album Reviews, saying Nelson "spans the C&W canyon from Rick's own "You Just Can't Quit" to "Kentucky Means Paradise" by Merle Travis"

Record World thought it was "an interesting album idea for Rick" and claimed "His manner is quite compatible with country music."

Suggesting that Nelson "cannily captured the idiomatic feel of contemporary country," biographer and music critic Joel Selvin wrote, "Artistically, Bright Lights served as a stunning reversal of field. It did not come out of a vacuum for Rick [...] But the idea of Rick Nelson as a country singer certainly came a surprise to the general public."

Richie Unterberger of AllMusic said, "Although Nelson's move into straight country music didn't result in notable commercial gains, it made sense given that his prior few rock albums hadn't done much, and that most rockabilly performers had long since gone into the country market, giving a two-star rating.

in Rick Nelson, Rock 'n' Roll Pioneer, Sheree Homer describes the album as "one of his most seminal albums of his career." Both The Encyclopedia of Popular Music and Billboard gave the album four-star ratings.

== Track listing ==
=== Side one ===
| No. | Title | Writer(s) | Length |
|---|---|---|---|
| 1. | "Truck Drivin' Man" | Terry Fell | 2:08 |
| 2. | "You Just Can't Quit" | Rick Nelson | 2:23 |
| 3. | "Louisiana Man" | Doug Kershaw | 3:07 |
| 4. | "Welcome to My World" | Ray Winkler, John Hathcock | 2:13 |
| 5. | "Kentucky Means Paradise" | Merle Travis | 2:14 |
| 6. | "Here Am I" | Glen Campbell, Marc Douglas | 2:26 |

=== Side two ===
| No. | Title | Writer(s) | Length |
|---|---|---|---|
| 1. | "Bright Lights and Country Music" | Bill Anderson, Jimmy Gateley | 2:30 |
| 2. | "Hello Walls" | Willie Nelson | 2:23 |
| 3. | "No Vacancy" | Merle Travis | 2:23 |
| 4. | "I'm a Fool to Care" | Ted Daffan | 2:32 |
| 5. | "Congratulations" | Willie Nelson | 3:02 |
| 6. | "Night Train to Memphis" | Owen Bradley, Marvin Hughes, Beasley Smith | 2:16 |

== Personnel ==
- Guitar: James Burton, Rick Nelson
- Bass: Glen Campbell, Joe Osborn
- Drums: Ritchie Frost
- Piano: Gene Garth
- Backing Vocals – The Jordanaires

== Charts ==
=== Singles ===
| Year | Title | U.S. Hot 100 | U.S. Cashbox | Canada (RPM) |
|---|---|---|---|---|
| 1966 | "You Just Can't Quit" | 108 | 76 | 24 |
