= Viggo Brodersen =

Danish musician

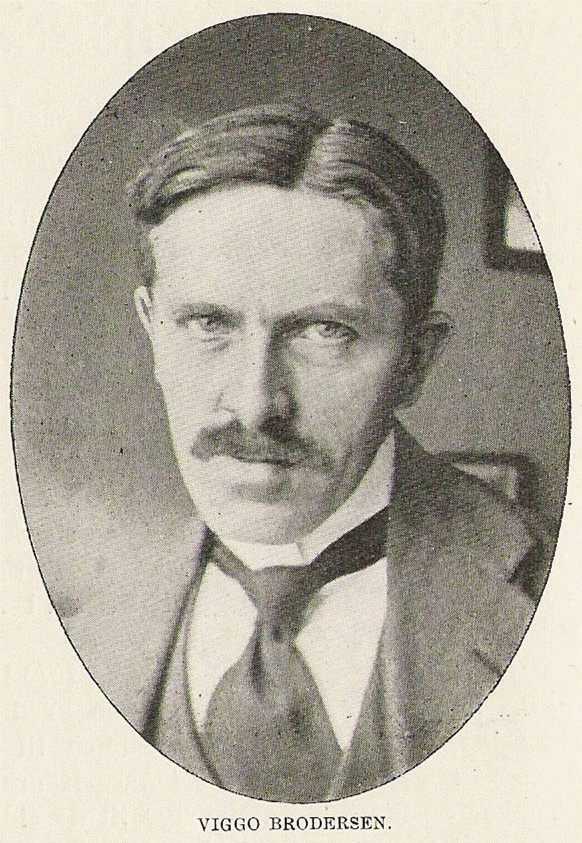
Viggo Brodersen.

Viggo Brodersen (26 March 1879 - 7 February 1965) was a Danish composer and pianist. Among his teachers in Copenhagen was Louis Glass. Much of his work is for his own instrument.
