= Best Always (Rick Nelson album) =

Studio album by Rick Nelson
- Released: April 19, 1965
- Genre: Rock and roll
- Length: 28:08
- Label: Decca
- Producer: Charles "Bud" Dant

Rick Nelson chronology
Spotlight on Rick (1964)	Best Always (1965)	Love and Kisses (1965)

Singles from Best Always
- 1. "Lonely Corner" Released: August 1964; 2. "Mean Old World" Released: March 6, 1965

Best Always is the twelfth studio album by rock and roll and pop idol Rick Nelson and his fifth for Decca Records, released on April 19, 1965. Jimmie Haskell arranged the album and Charles "Bud" Dant produced it.

The LP contains a mix of covers of old and recent hits that included four songs also having chart success: "My Blue Heaven" by Fats Domino from 1956, "Since I Don't Have You" by the Skyliners in 1959, "You Don't Know Me" by Ray Charles from 1962 and "I Know a Place" by Petula Clark.

The single, "Mean Old World", debuted on the Billboard Hot 100 in the chart dated March 20, 1965, reaching number 96 in a two-week stay. and number 94 on the Cashbox singles charts during it sole week stay. Another single, "Lonely Corner", spent a week on the Billboard Bubbling Under Hot 100 Singles chart in the issue dated August 29, 1964, peaking at number 113.

The album was released on compact disc by Ace Records on March 10, 1998 as tracks 1 through 12 on a pairing of two albums on one CD with tracks 13 through 24 consisting of Nelson's 1965 album, Love and Kisses. Bear Family included the album in the 2008 For You: The Decca Years box set.

== Reception ==
Professional ratings
Review scores
Source	Rating
AllMusic	3/5 stars
The Encyclopedia of Popular Music	2/5 stars
Record Mirror	4/5 stars

Richie Unterberger of AllMusic said that Best Always "isn't bad but "there's little to distinguish it from the other easygoing pop/rock albums he made during the period", suggesting "Nelson stretches his vocal range on the cover of the Skyliners' 'Since I Don't Have You', and gives a taste of his upcoming move into country with a version of 'You Don't Know Me'.

Billboard stated that the covers Nelson recorded "are given fine interpretations."

Cashbox described it as "a compilation of mixed tunes, some soft and some driving. Along with his recent single, "Mean Old World," Nelson bounces through "I Know A Place" and the while back "Since I Don't Have You."

Record World notes that Nelson "adds his own versions of top rock songs like 'I Know a Place' and 'Since I Don't Have You'.

Record Mirror thought the album was "genuinely entertaining" and claimed that each track was "given single treatment, rather than a general album sound".

The Encyclopedia of Popular Music called the album "disappointing".

== Track listing ==
=== Side one ===
No.	Title	Writer(s)	Length
1.	"I'm Not Ready for You Yet"	Buzz Cason, Paul Hampton	2:05
2.	"You Don't Know Me"	Eddy Arnold, Cindy Walker	2:24
3.	"Ladies Choice"	Jerry Fuller	2:17
4.	"Lonely Corner"	Johnny Burnette, Betty Murdoch	2:03
5.	"Only the Young"	Pat Boone, Jimmy Seals	2:23
6.	"Mean Old World"	Billy Vera	2:18

=== Side two ===
No.	Title	Writer(s)	Length
1.	"I Know a Place"	Tony Hatch	2:48
2.	"Since I Don't Have You"	Jackie Taylor, James Beaumont, Janet Vogel, Joseph Rock, Joe Verscharen, Lennie Martin, Wally Lester	2:33
3.	"It's Beginning to Hurt"	Dave Burgess	1:58
4.	"My Blue Heaven"	Walter Donaldson, George A. Whiting	2:17
5.	"How Does It Go"	Jay Goodis, Jerry Keller	3:01
6.	"When the Chips Are Down"	Dash Crofts, Keith MacKendrick, Jimmy Seals	2:01

== Charts ==
=== Singles ===
Year	Title	U.S. Hot 100	U.S. Cashbox
1964	"Lonely Corner"	113	105
1965	"Mean Old World"	96	94
