= Love and Kisses (Rick Nelson album) =

Studio album by Rick Nelson
- Released: November 15, 1965
- Genre: Rock and roll
- Length: 26:24
- Label: Decca
- Producer: Charles "Bud" Dant

Rick Nelson chronology
Best Always (1965)	Love and Kisses (1965)	Bright Lights and Country Music (1966)

Singles from Love and Kisses
- 1. "Come Out Dancin'" Released: June 1965; 2. "Love and Kisses" Released: September 1965

Love and Kisses is the thirteenth studio album by American rock and roll and pop singer Rick Nelson and his sixth for Decca Records, released on November 15, 1965.

Two singles, "Cone Out Dancin'" bubbled under" Billboard's Hot 100, for its sole week that began in the issue dated July 3, 1965, and peaked at number 130. number 131 on the Cashbox singles chart, "Love and Kisses" peaked at number 124 on the Cashbox singles chart.

Nelson sang three songs in his last film of the same name: "Love and Kisses", "Say You Love Me", and "Come Out Dancin'". The LP had a mix of covers of old and recent hits that included two songs from that also had chart success in 1965 via Ed Ames: "Try to Remember" and 1963 Kai Winding: "More (Theme from Mondo Cane)" Jimmie Haskell arranged the album and Charles "Bud" Dant produced it.

The album was released on compact disc by Ace Records on March 10, 1998, as tracks 13 through 24 on a pairing of two albums on one CD with tracks 1 through 12 consisting of Nelson's 1965 album, Best Always. Bear Family included the album in the 2008 box set, For You: The Decca Years.

== Reception ==
Professional ratings
Review scores
Source	Rating
AllMusic	2/5 stars
The Encyclopedia of Popular Music	2/5 stars
Record Mirror	3/5 stars

Richie Unterberger of AllMusic described the album as "a tepid, stagnant collection," and stated that "Some of the cuts sound vaguely updated with harder-edged guitars than unusual." He added, "Three of the numbers were featured in Nelson's forgotten Love and Kisses film, including the embarrassing single 'Come Out Dancin'." Reviewing the CD reissue, he referred to it as "a subpar collection".

Billboard selected the album for a "Spotlight Pick" review, and stated Nelson "displays a warm and tender feel for ballads such 'Try to Remember', Roger Miller's 'I Catch Myself Crying'. 'More' is a pulsating rocker."

Cashbox described the album as a "romance-oriented LP" and believed that it "aimed for the romance-minded audience." They said that "Included among the tracks are 'Love and Kisses,' 'Come Out Dancing,' and 'Say You Love Me,' plus Roger Miller's 'I Catch Myself Crying,' and a host of other goodies, tailored to the artist's relaxed style."

Record Mirror gave the album a mixed review, saying Nelson "sings with sensitivity and punch, but the group boom obviously pushed him backward in his career", giving it a three-star rating.

The Encyclopedia of Popular Music described the album as "disappointing", giving the album a two-star rating. It received the same rating from AllMusic as well.

== Track listing ==
=== Side one ===
No.	Title	Writer(s)	Length
1.	"Love and Kisses"	Sonny Curtis	1:46
2.	"I Catch Myself Crying"	Roger Miller	1:59
3.	"Love Is Where You Find It"	Joey Cooper, Red West	2:17
4.	"Try to Remember"	Tom Jones, Harvey Schmidt	2:19
5.	"Our Own Funny Way"	Jerry Keller, Wayne Kent	2:01
6.	"Liz"	Johnny Burnette	2:26

=== Side two ===
No.	Title	Writer(s)	Length
1.	"Say You Love Me"	Sonny Curtis	2:24
2.	"More (Theme from Mondo Cane)"	Riz Ortolani, Nino Oliviero, Norman Newell	1:59
3.	"Raincoat in the River"	Chuck Kaye, Aaron Schroeder	2:21
4.	"Come Out Dancin'"	Clint Ballard Jr, Angela Riela	2:03
5.	"I Should Have Loved You More"	Victor Millrose, Jerry Roberson	2:41
6.	"I Paid for Loving You"	Dick Addrisi Don Addrisi	2:08
