= Wooly Bully (album) =

Studio album by Sam the Sham and the Pharaohs
- Released: June 1965
- Genres: Rock and roll; rhythm and blues
- Length: 28:52
- Label: MGM
- Producer: Stan Kesler

Sam the Sham and the Pharaohs chronology
Wooly Bully (1965)	Their Second Album (1965)

Singles from Wooly Bully
- 1. "Wooly Bully" Released: December 1964

Professional ratings
Review scores
Source	Rating
Allmusic	3.5/5 stars
Record Mirror	4/5 stars

Wooly Bully is the debut studio album by the band Sam the Sham and the Pharaohs, released in 1965 on MGM Records SE-4297 (stereo). It was released following the success of their hit "Wooly Bully", and contains a mixture of cover songs and original compositions. It is an early example of Tex-Mex music that was also being popularized by groups like Sir Douglas Quintet, Freddy Fender and ? and the Mysterians.

The song "Wooly Bully" was recorded at Phillips Recording Service in Memphis, which was owned by Sam Phillips.

== Reception ==
The album reached No. 26 on the Billboard albums chart on August 28, 1965. Allmusic's Eugene Chadbourne gives it a 3 1/2-star rating, writing that the band performed originals and cover songs with equal skill and the album was worth hearing beyond the hit song "Wooly Bully".

== Track listing ==
Side one

1. "Wooly Bully" (Domingo Samudio) – 2:20
2. "The Memphis Beat" (Milton Addington, Allen Reynolds) – 2:09
3. "I Found a Love" (Alonzo Tucker, Jackie Wilson) – 2:10
4. "Go-Go Girls" (David Martin) – 2:13
5. "Every Woman I Know (Crazy 'Bout An Auto)" (Billy "The Kid" Emerson) – 2:17
6. "Haunted House" (Robert Geddins) – 3:10

Side two

1. "Juímonos (Let's Went)" (Samudio) – 2:30
2. "Shotgun" (Autry DeWalt II) – 2:50
3. "Sorry 'Bout That" (Stan Kesler, Gary McEwen) – 1:55
4. "Gangster of Love" (Johnny "Guitar" Watson) – 2:18
5. "Mary Lee" (Samudio) – 2:23
6. "Long Tall Sally" (Robert "Bumps" Blackwell, Enotris Johnson, Richard Penniman) – 1:45

== Personnel ==
=== Musicians ===
- Domingo "Sam" Samudio – lead vocals and backing vocals, Farfisa organ
- Ray Stinnett – electric guitar and backing vocals
- David A. Martin – bass and backing vocals (died 1987)
- Butch Gibson – saxophone and backing vocals
- Jerry Patterson – drums

=== Technical ===
- Stan Kesler – producer
- Val Valentin – engineer
- Bill Webb – photography
- Joy Webb – photography

== Charts ==
Chart (1965)	Peak position
US Top LPs (Billboard)	26

Singles

Year	Single	Chart	Position
1965	"Wooly Bully"	US Billboard Hot 100	2
