= Wooly Bully =

1964 song by Sam the Sham and the Pharaohs

- Cover of the 1965 Italy single

Single by Sam the Sham and the Pharaohs

from the album Wooly Bully
- B-side: "Ain't Gonna Move"
- Released: 1965
- Recorded: 1964
- Studio: Phillips Recording, Memphis, Tennessee
- Genre: Garage rock; rock and roll
- Length: 2:20
- Label: XL 906, MGM K13322
- Songwriter: Domingo Samudio
- Producer: Stan Kesler

Sam the Sham and the Pharaohs singles chronology
"Ju Ju Hand" (1964)	"Wooly Bully" (1965)	"Juimonos" (1965)

"Wooly Bully" is a song originally recorded by rock and roll band Sam the Sham and the Pharaohs in 1964. Based on a standard 12-bar blues progression, it was written by the band's frontman, Domingo "Sam" Samudio. It was released as a single on the small Memphis-based XL label (#906) in 1964 and was picked up in 1965 by MGM. The song was recorded at Sam C. Phillips Recording Studio at 639 Madison Avenue in Memphis, the successor to Phillips' original Sun Studio.

== Chart history ==
"Wooly Bully" was the band's first and biggest hit song. It became a worldwide success, selling three million copies and reaching No. 2 on the American Hot 100 chart on June 5–12, 1965. They were kept from reaching the top spot by The Beach Boys' "Help Me, Rhonda" and The Supremes' "Back in My Arms Again". "Wooly Bully" went to No. 31 on the Hot Rhythm & Blues Singles chart. The song also reached No. 2 on the Canadian CHUM Charts.

The song was the first American record to sell a million copies during the British Invasion and was influenced by the British rock sound which was mixed with traditional Mexican-American conjunto rhythms. It stayed in the Hot 100 for 18 weeks, the longest time for any song in 1965, and was nominated for a Grammy Award. It was named Billboard's number-one song of the year despite never reaching No. 1 on a weekly Hot 100, making this the first occurrence of such an event on the Hot 100. On August 5, 1965, the single was certified as gold by the RIAA. It was later included on the band's 1965 album Wooly Bully.

== Title and lyrics ==
"Wooly Bully" is a reworking of the 1962 tune "Hully Gully Now" on the Dallas-based Gay Shel label by Big Bo & The Arrows (vocal by Little Smitty), which was based on Junior Parker's "Feelin' Good". The song was given the green light after Samudio rewrote the lyrics to replace "Hully Gully" with "Wooly Bully" and a few additional lyrical changes. Samudio retained the "watch it, watch it now" refrain from the original version.

The lyrics of "Wooly Bully" were hard to understand; in consequence, some radio stations banned the song. The lyrics describe a conversation between "Mattie" and "Hattie" concerning the "Wooly Bully" (a creature which Mattie describes as "a thing she saw [that] had two big horns and a wooly jaw" – that is, an American bison) and the desirability of developing dancing skills, although no attempt is made to synthesize these divergent topics. The warning "Let's not be L-7" means "Let's not be square", from the shape formed by the fingers making an L on one hand and a 7 on the other. Sam the Sham underscores the Tex-Mex nature of the song by counting out the rhythm in Spanish and English ("Uno! Dos! One, two, tres, cuatro!"), and the characteristic simple organ riffing, with a tenor saxophone solo in the middle. According to Samudio, "The count down part of the song was also not planned. I was just goofing around and counted off in Tex-Mex. It just blew everybody away, and actually, I wanted it taken off the record. We did three takes, all of them different, and they took the first take and released it."

== Personnel ==
- Domingo "Sam" Samudio – lead vocals and backing vocals, Farfisa organ
- Ray Stinnett – electric guitar and backing vocals
- David A. Martin – bass and backing vocals (died 1987)
- Butch Gibson – saxophone and backing vocals
- Jerry Patterson – drums

== Charts ==
=== Weekly charts ===
Chart (1965–66)	Peak position
Argentina (CAPIF)	4
Austria (Disc Parade)	3
Australia (Kent Music Report)	22
Belgium (Ultratop 50 Flanders)	1
Belgium (Ultratop 50 Wallonia)	3
Canada (CHUM Chart)	2
Denmark (Danmarks Radio)	10
France (SNEP)	5
Finland (Mitä Suomi Soittaa?)	18
Mexico (Audiomusica)	1
Netherlands (Veronica Top 40)	1
Netherlands (Single Top 100)	1
Norway (VG-lista)	7
Philippines (DZBI)	1
South Africa (Springbok Radio)	2
Sweden (Kvällstoppen)	2
Sweden (Tio i Topp)	3
Switzerland (Schweizer Hitparade)	2
Rhodesia (Lyons Maid)	4
UK (Disc Weekly Top 30)	13
UK (Melody Maker Pop 50)	9
UK (New Musical Express Top 30)	11
UK (Record Retailer Top 50)	11
UK (Record Retailer Top R&B Singles)	1
US (Billboard Hot 100)	2
US (Billboard Hot Rhythm & Blues Singles)	31
US (Cash Box Top 100)	2
US (Record World 100 Top Pops)	1
West Germany (Musikmarkt)	2

=== Year-end charts ===
Chart (1965)	Peak position
Belgium (Ultratop 50 Flanders)	15
Netherlands (Veronica Top 40)	6
France (SNEP)	35
UK (Record Retailer)	91
US (Billboard Hot 100)	1
US (Cash Box Top 100)	2
West Germany (Musikmarkt)	4

== Certifications ==
Certifications for "Wooly Bully"
Region	Certification	Certified units/sales
United States (RIAA)	Gold	1,000,000^{^}
^{^} Shipments figures based on certification alone.

== Awards ==
In 2009, the original 1965 release of the song on the MGM label by Sam the Sham and the Pharaohs was inducted into the Grammy Hall of Fame.

== Commercial usage ==
Starting in the 2025–26 season, the Utah Mammoth of the National Hockey League, began using Wooly Bully as their win song. Wooly Bully is played at the conclusion of every home game where Utah wins, in regulation or overtime.

== Cover Versions ==
- The British Two Tone Ska band Bad Manners covered the song for their debut 1980 album Ska 'N' B
