= Having a Wild Weekend (album) =

Studio album by the Dave Clark Five
- Released: 28 June 1965
- Genres: Pop rock, beat, rock and roll
- Length: 29:34
- Labels: Epic; LN 24162 / BN 26162
- Producer: Dave Clark

The Dave Clark Five US chronology
Weekend in London (1965)	Having a Wild Weekend (1965)	I Like It Like That (1965)

Singles from Try Too Hard
- 1. "Catch Us If You Can" / "On the Move" Released: 5 August 1965

Having a Wild Weekend is the sixth American album by the British band the Dave Clark Five. It was presented as the soundtrack to the film of the same name, released in the UK as Catch Us If You Can. The album reached the Top 20 on the Billboard and contains the worldwide hit single "Catch Us If You Can".

== Overview ==
The film Having a Wild Weekend was the directorial debut of John Boorman and combined social drama with light-hearted fun in the vein of the Beatles' A Hard Day's Night. Although the album (as well as the UK version) was presented as the soundtrack to the film, only the four songs that actually appeared in the film are included here ("Having a Wild Weekend", "Catch Us If You Can", "Sweet Memories" and "On The Move"). The other songs from the film were already released on the band's previous albums.

== Release ==
Professional ratings
Review scores
Source	Rating
AllMusic	3/5 stars

The album was produced by Dave Clark and all songs were written by the band members. It was released on 28 June 1965 on the Epic Records label in both mono (LN 24162) and electronic stereo versions (BN 26162). With different artwork but the same title, it was also released in Canada. The sleeve note was written by Myles Eiten of Ingenue magazine. The album cover art featured the band in a scene from the film with actress Barbara Ferris. On the back of the cover was the band captured in costumes of famous people (again from the movie scene). Dave Clark as Groucho Marx, Mike Smith as Jean Harlow, Rick Huxley as Stan Laurel, Denis Payton as Sabu (only Lenny Davidson is dressed as an anonymous "bathing belle").

The album was a huge success upon release, returning the group to the Billboard Top 20 (No. 15) and Cashbox (No. 11). The album's pilot single was the song "Catch Us If You Can", which became a worldwide hit.

== Reception ==
Billboard magazine wrote in the official review, "The rocker New Kind of Love and the swinging Catch Us If You Can have the earmarks of singles hits. Sweet Memories is a beautiful ballad performed instrumentally. A fast chart climber."

== Track listing ==
Side one
No.	Title	Writer(s)	Length
1.	"Having a Wild Weekend"	Dave Clark, Mike Smith	1:52
2.	"New Kind Of Love"	Dave Clark, Mike Smith	2:26
3.	"Dum-Dee-Dee-Dum"	Dave Clark, Denis Payton	1:50
4.	"I Said I Was Sorry"	Dave Clark, Lenny Davidson	3:01
5.	"No Stopping"	Dave Clark, Lenny Davidson	2:04
6.	"Don't Be Taken In"	Dave Clark, Lenny Davidson	2:24

Side two
No.	Title	Writer(s)	Length
1.	"Catch Us If You Can"	Dave Clark, Lenny Davidson	1:56
2.	"When I'm Alone"	Dave Clark, Mike Smith	2:30
3.	"If You Come Back"	Dave Clark, Lenny Davidson	2:51
4.	"Sweet Memories"	Dave Clark, Lenny Davidson	2:42
5.	"Don't You Realize"	Dave Clark, Mike Smith	3:36
6.	"On The Move"	Dave Clark, Denis Payton	2:22

== Songs in the film ==
The British soundtrack was called "Catch Us If You Can", but contained mostly different songs than the American album. Here is the actual list of songs used in the film and the albums on which the songs were released.

Song in the film	Original US album	Original UK album
Catch Us if You Can	Having a Wild Weekend	Catch Us If You Can
Sweet Memories	Having a Wild Weekend	Catch Us If You Can
Time	Glad All Over	A Session with The Dave Clark Five
When	Coast to Coast	Non LP track, Wild Weekend EP
I Can't Stand It	Coast to Coast	Catch Us If You Can
On the Move	Having a Wild Weekend	Catch Us If You Can
Move On	American Tour	Non LP track, B-side single Catch Us If You Can
Ol' Sol	American Tour	Non LP track, Wild Weekend EP
Having a Wild Weekend	Having a Wild Weekend	Non LP track, Wild Weekend EP

== Personnel ==
The Dave Clark Five

- Dave Clark - drums, backing vocals
- Mike Smith - keyboards, lead vocals
- Lenny Davidson - electric guitars, backing vocals
- Rick Huxley - bass guitar, backing vocals
- Denis Payton - tenor saxophone, backing vocals

Additional musician

- Bobby Graham - drums (session drummer, not stated on the record sleeve)

== Charts ==
=== Weekly charts ===
Chart (1965–1966)	Peak position
US Billboard Top LP's	15
US Cash Box Top 100 Albums	11
US Record World 100 Top LP's	7

=== Year-end charts ===
Chart (1965)	Peak position
US Cash Box Top 100 Albums	96
