= Soli III =

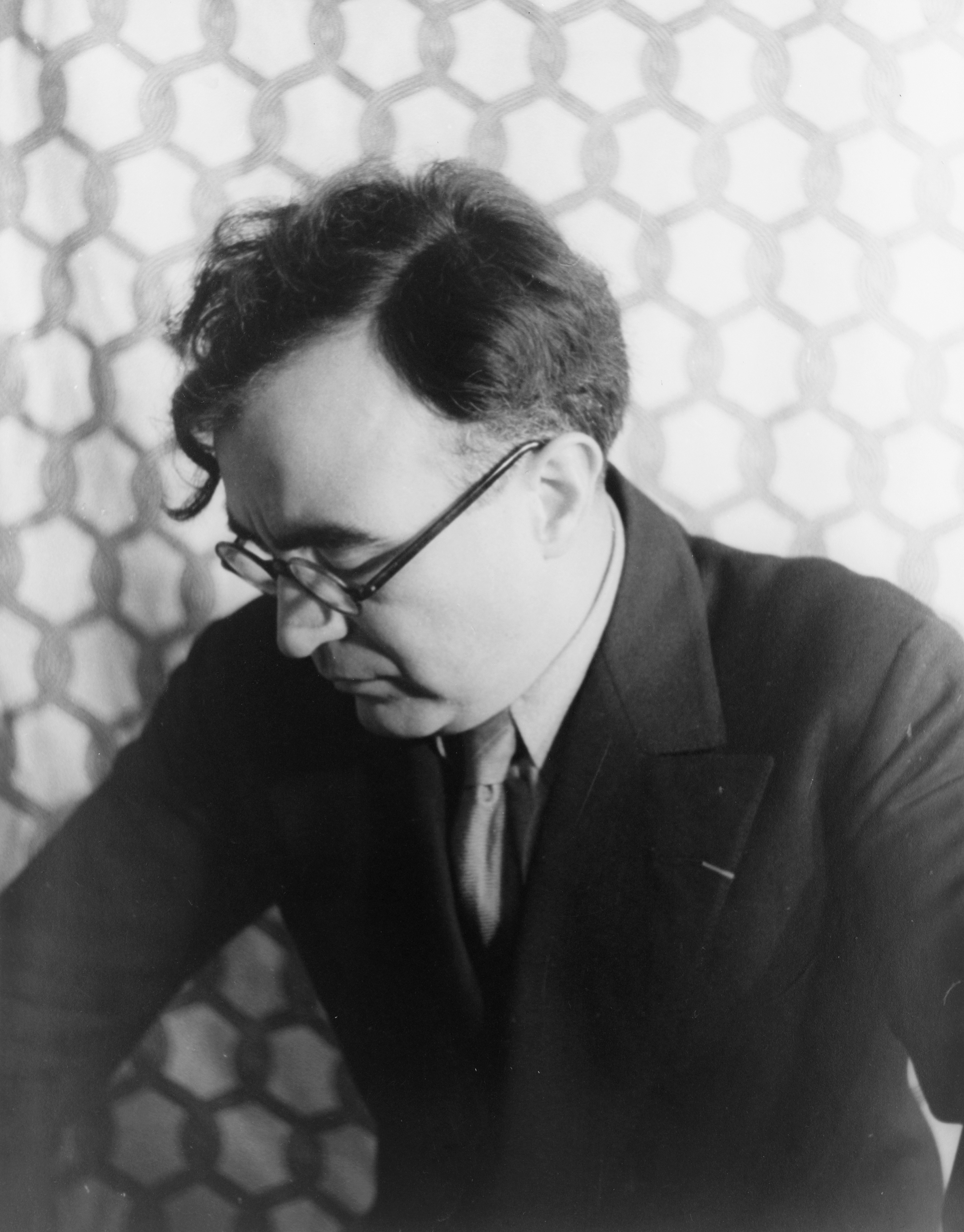
Carlos Chávez in 1937

Soli III is a work for four soloists and orchestra by Mexican composer Carlos Chávez, written in 1965. Soli is the collective title given to a series of four works, each featuring a succession of solos. The other three compositions in the series are chamber music works, while the present one is a sort of concerto grosso. A performance of the work lasts about sixteen minutes.

The Solis belong to the more "experimental", high-modernist strand of Chávez's compositional output, in contrast to the more traditional character of most of the large-ensemble works. This group of works, which also includes the three Inventions (No. 1 for piano, 1958; No. 2 for string trio, 1965; No. 3 for harp, 1967) and the orchestral compositions Resonancias (1964), Elatio (1967), Discovery, Clio (both 1969), and Initium (1973), features an abstract, atonal musical language based on the principle of non-repetition. In the composer's own words, the objective is one of "constant rebirth, of true derivation: a stream that never comes back to its source; a stream of eternal development, like a spiral, always linked to, and continuing, its original source, but always searching for new and unlimited spaces".

== History ==
Soli III was commissioned by the Southwest German Radio (SWR) and was composed in 1965. The first performance was given in a broadcast by the Southwest German Radio Symphony Orchestra under the composer's direction on 24 November 1965, in the Hans Rosbaud Hall in Baden-Baden. The Western Hemisphere premiere was given on the third concert of the Third Inter-American Music Festival in Caracas, Venezuela, on 16 May 1966, by the Philadelphia Orchestra, conducted by Eugene Ormandy. The concert was recorded by Voice of America for possible broadcast, and was archived from the original master tapes to digital preservation master WAV files by the Library of Congress Magnetic Recording Laboratory in 2004; OCLC 75376442, LCCN 2005-650237.

== Analysis ==
The work is scored for four soloists: bassoon, trumpet, viola, and timpani, accompanied by an orchestra consisting of three flutes, three oboes, three clarinets, three bassoons (third doubling contrabassoon), four horns, three trumpets, three trombones, tuba, timpani, three percussionists, piano, two harps, and strings.

In Soli III the principle of featuring soloists in turn is expanded to the form of a concerto grosso or sinfonia concertante, with the soloists accompanied by an orchestra. Unlike in a concerto grosso, however, the solo instruments do not together constitute a concertino group, but instead each soloist in turn leads a concertante group of related instruments in the orchestra. For example, the first solo group, led by the solo bassoon, features a series of intricate ensembles for a trio of two bassoons and contrabassoon in the orchestra.
