= Christine Roque =

French singer

- Born: Christine Roques; 7 June 1965 (age 60)
- Origin: France
- Occupation: Singer
- Years active: 1987–1989

Christine Roque (born 7 June 1965 in Toulouse, France) is a French singer and a one-hit wonder for her 1987 hit single "Premiers frissons d'amour".

== Biography ==
After being a classical dance teacher, she decided to go to Paris to begin a music career. Her first single, "Premiers frissons d'amour", was written by Corinne Sinclair, and achieved Silver status in France and hit No. 10 on the SNEP chart. Roque gained a price for her performance during the festival in Bordeaux. Over the next three years, she released "Jérémy", "Rêves impudiques" and "Sale menteur", which were unsuccessful. She has two sisters.

== Discography ==
=== Singles ===
- 1987 : "Premiers frissons d'amour – No. 10 in France, Silver disc
- 1988 : "Jérémy"
- 1988 : "Rêves impudiques"
- 1989 : "Sale menteur"
