= Creation (John Coltrane album) =

Live album by John Coltrane
- Released: 1965
- Recorded: February 23, 1964 and April 2, 1965
- Label: Blue Parrot

Creation is a 1965 album by jazz musician John Coltrane. The 1965 tracks - "Impressions" and "Creation" - were recorded at the Half Note Cafe, New York. "Alabama" was recorded in San Francisco a year before. "Creation" may be incorrectly titled - the title was drawn from a bootleg album. This is the only known recording of the tune. An abbreviated version of the same performance has appeared on several compilation albums (e.g. "Kind Of Coltrane").

== Track listing ==
Original LP release Creation (Blue Parrot).

1. "Alabama” – 6:10
2. "Impressions” – 14:11
3. "Creation” – 23:05

== Personnel ==
Recorded February 23, 1964 and April 2, 1965.

- John Coltrane — tenor saxophone/soprano saxophone
- McCoy Tyner — piano
- Jimmy Garrison — double bass
- Elvin Jones — drums
