= Sam the Sham =

American rock and roll singer (born 1937)

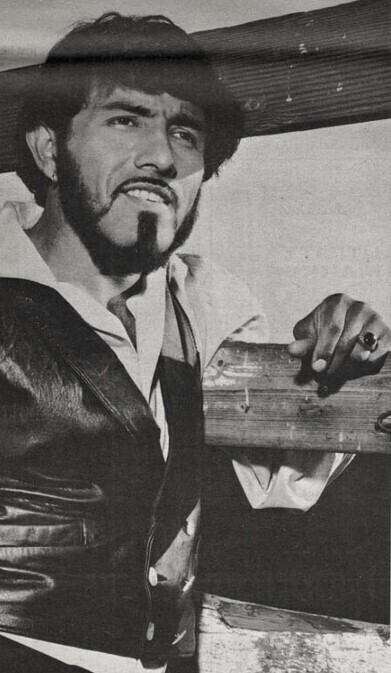
- Sam the Sham in late 1966

Background information
- Born: Domingo Samudio; February 28, 1937 (age 89); Dallas, Texas, U.S.
- Genres: Rock and roll; frat rock; Chicano rock; proto-punk
- Occupations: Singer; musician
- Instrument: Vocals
- Years active: 1959–1982

Domingo Samudio (born February 28, 1937), better known by his stage name Sam the Sham, is a retired American rock and roll singer. Sam the Sham is known for his camp robe and turban and hauling his equipment in a 1952 Packard hearse with maroon velvet curtains. As the front man for the Pharaohs, he sang on several Top 40 hits in the mid-1960s; "Wooly Bully" by Sam the Sham and the Pharaohs was the number one song of 1965 according to Billboard magazine's year-end Hot 100. However, the song never reached number one on the weekly charts. "Li'l Red Riding Hood" was another charting song for Samudio.

== Biography ==
=== Early career ===
Samudio made his singing debut in second grade, representing his school in a radio broadcast. Later, he took up guitar and formed a group with friends, one of whom was Trini Lopez. After graduating from high school, Samudio joined the Navy, where he was known as "Big Sam." He lived in Panama for six years, until his discharge.

Back in the States, Samudio enrolled in college, studying voice at Arlington State College, now the University of Texas at Arlington. He recalled: "I was studying classical in the daytime and playing rock and roll at night. That lasted about two years, before I dropped out and became a carny."

=== Personal life ===
Most sources refer to Samudio's ancestry as Mexican-American. However, a 1998 article by the Chicago Tribune described Samudio as being of Basque/Apache descent. In a 2007 conversation with music writer Joe Nick Patoski, Samudio described his grandparents fleeing the Mexican Revolution and settling in Texas, where his family supported themselves working in the cotton fields.

After leaving the music business, Samudio worked in Mexico as an interpreter and as a mate on small commercial boats in the Gulf of Mexico. He later became a motivational speaker and still makes occasional concert appearances. He was inducted into the Memphis Music Hall of Fame in 2016. Samudio operates a Christian outreach ministry in Memphis, TN.

== Sam the Sham and the Pharaohs ==
Sam the Sham and the Pharaohs
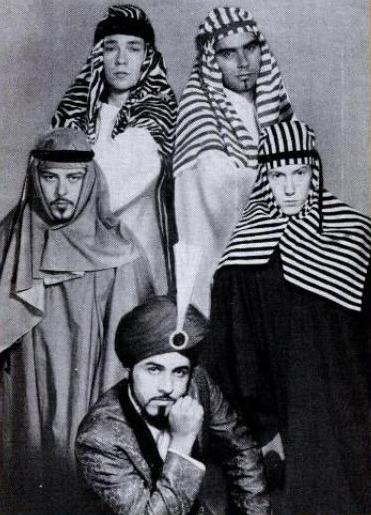
- The Pharaohs in 1965. Clockwise from upper left: Butch Gibson, David A. Martin, Jerry Patterson, Sam the Sham (in front) and Ray Stinnet

Background information
- Origin: Dallas, Texas, U.S.
- Genres: Garage rock
- Years active: 1961-1967
- Past members: Domingo "Sam" Samudio; Ray Stinnett; David A. Martin; Butch Gibson; Jerry Patterson; Tony "Butch" Gerace; Frankie Carabetta; Billy Bennett; Andy Kuha; Carl Miedke; Russell Fowler; Todd Lovas; Omar "Big Man” Lopez; Vincent Lopez

In Dallas in 1961, Samudio formed the Pharaohs, the name inspired from the costumes in Yul Brynner's portrayal as pharaoh in the 1956 film The Ten Commandments. The other members of the Pharaohs were Carl Miedke, Russell Fowler, Omar "Big Man" Lopez, and Vincent Lopez (no relation to Omar). In 1962, the group made a record that did not sell and later disbanded.

In May 1963, Vincent Lopez was playing for Andy and the Nightriders in Louisiana. When their organist quit, Samudio joined. Andy and the Nightriders were Andy Anderson, David A. Martin, Vincent Lopez, and Samudio. The Nightriders became house band at The Congo Club, near Leesville, Louisiana. It was here that Samudio took the name Sam the Sham from a joke about his lack of ability as a vocalist.

In June 1963, the Nightriders headed for Memphis, Tennessee, and became the house band at The Diplomat. In late summer 1963, Andy Anderson and Vincent Lopez left to return to Texas. Samudio and bassist David A. Martin replaced them with drummer Jerry Patterson and guitarist Ray Stinnett and changed the band's name to Sam the Sham and the Pharaohs. Shortly thereafter, the band added saxophonist Butch Gibson.

=== Breakthrough hit ===
After paying to record and press records to sell at gigs, Sam the Sham and the Pharaohs wound up with the XL label in Memphis. There they recorded their first and biggest hit, "Wooly Bully", in late 1964. Once MGM picked up the record, "Wooly Bully" ended up selling three million copies and reaching No. 2 on the Billboard Hot 100 on 5 June 1965, at a time when American pop music charts were dominated by the British Invasion. It was awarded a gold disc. Leonard Stogel was their manager.

Although "Wooly Bully" never reached No. 1, it lingered on the Hot 100 for 18 weeks, the most weeks for any single within the calendar year 1965, 14 of which were in the top 40. The record achieved the distinction of becoming the first Billboard "Number One Record of the Year" not to have topped a weekly Hot 100 and remained the only one for 35 years, until Faith Hill's "Breathe", Lifehouse's "Hanging by a Moment", and Dua Lipa's "Levitating" in 2000, 2001, and 2021, respectively.

The Pharaohs' next releases – "Ju Ju Hand" (No. 26 US, Canadian No. 31) and "Ring Dang Doo" – were minor successes.

=== New lineup and second hit ===
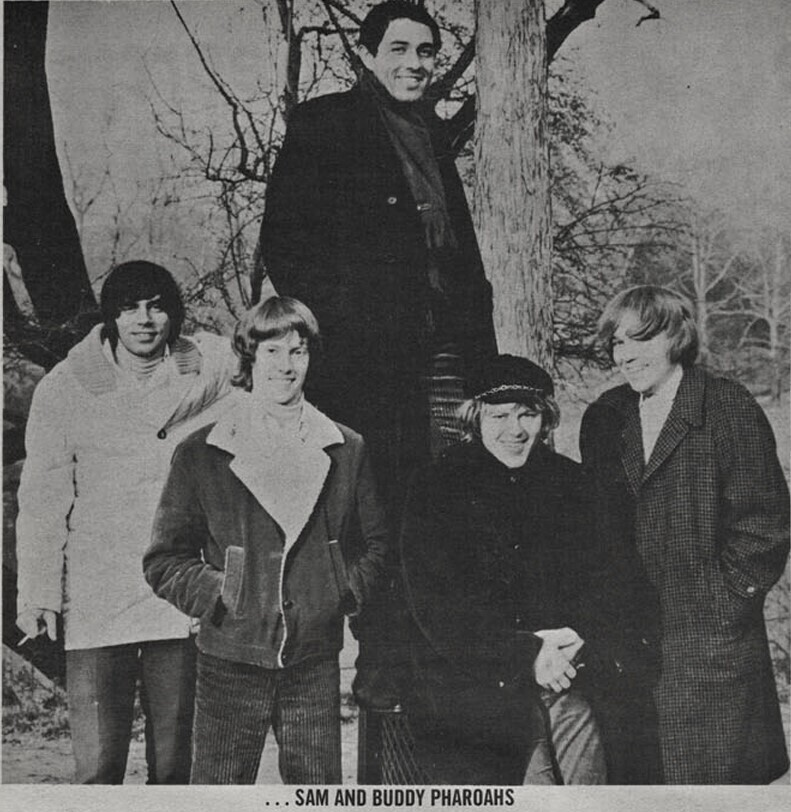
The new Sam the Sham and the Pharaohs in mid-1966, which abandoned the turban and robes

In late 1965, 11 months after "Wooly Bully", David A. Martin, Jerry Patterson, Ray Stinnett, and Butch Gibson left over a financial dispute.

Sam's manager, Leonard Stogel, discovered Tony Gee & the Gypsys at the Metropole Cafe in Times Square, New York City, and brought them on as the new Pharaohs. The band, besides Sam, was Tony "Butch" Gerace (bass guitar and vocals), Frankie Carabetta (keyboards, saxophone and vocals), Billy Bennett (drums and percussion), and Andy Kuha (guitar and vocals). This new set of Pharaohs recorded "Lil' Red Riding Hood". On the Hot 100, "Lil' Red Riding Hood" began its two-week peak at No. 2 the week of August 6, 1966, just as another fairy tale title, Crispian St. Peters' "The Pied Piper", ended its third and final week there at No. 4.

A series of mostly novelty tunes followed, all on the MGM label, keeping the group on the charts into 1967. Titles included "The Hair on My Chinny Chin Chin" (US No. 22, Canadian No. 13), "How Do You Catch a Girl" (US No. 27, Canadian No. 12), "I Couldn't Spell !!*@!", and "Oh That's Good, No That's Bad" (US No. 54).

=== Post-Pharaohs career ===
In late 1966, three women, Fran Curcio, Lorraine Gennaro, and Jane Anderson, joined as the Shamettes. The group traveled to Asia as Sam the Sham & the Pharaohs and the Shamettes and released the album titled The Sam the Sham Revue (originally to be titled Nefertiti by Sam the Sham and the Pharaohs, which is printed on the inside record labels). Samudio also released a solo album in late 1967, titled Ten of Pentacles.

Domingo Samudio, better known as Sam the Sham, had a small acting role as the 1st Expressman in the 1967 Metro-Goldwyn-Mayer Western comedy film "The Fastest Guitar Alive", which starred legendary singer Roy Orbison.

In 1970, Samudio went off on his own, and in 1971, issued an Atlantic album called Sam, Hard and Heavy. He also wrote the liner notes on the album, which won the Grammy Award for Best Album Notes in 1972. The album featured Duane Allman on guitar, the Dixie Flyers, and the Memphis Horns. He formed a new band in 1974. In the late 1970s, he worked with baritone saxophonist Joe Sunseri and his band, based in New Orleans. The early 1980s found Samudio working with Ry Cooder and Freddy Fender on the soundtrack for the film The Border.

== Discography ==
=== Albums ===
As Sam the Sham and the Pharaohs:

- Wooly Bully (June 1965) MGM E (Mono)/SE (Stereo) 4297
- Their Second Album (November 1965) MGM E/SE 4314
- On Tour (March 1966) MGM E/SE 4347
- Li'l Red Riding Hood (July 1966) MGM E/SE 4407
- The Best of Sam the Sham & the Pharaohs (February 1967) MGM SE 4422
- The Sam the Sham Revue [titled Nefertiti in Canada] (October 1967) MGM E/SE 4479
- Pharaohization: The Best of Sam the Sham and the Pharaohs (1985) Rhino 122

As Sam the Sham:

- Ten of Pentacles [inside labels read "The 10 of Penticles" by Sam the Sham & the Pharaohs] (February 1968) MGM E/SE 4526
- Won't Be Long (1994) Samara Productions, Inc. SAM002A

As Sam Samudio:

- Sam, Hard and Heavy (March 1971) Atlantic SD 8271

As Sam and Charity:

- Running With the Rabbits (1983)

=== Singles ===
As Sam the Sham and the Pharaohs:

Year	Titles (A-side, B-side) Both sides from same album except where indicated	Peak chart positions				Album
Year	Titles (A-side, B-side) Both sides from same album except where indicated	US Hot 100	US R&B	CAN	UK	Album
1965	"Wooly Bully" b/w "Ain't Gonna Move" (Non-album track)	2	31	2	11	Wooly Bully
1965	"Juímonos (Let's Went)" b/w "Shotgun"	-	-	-	-	Wooly Bully
1965	"Ju Ju Hand" b/w "Big City Lights" (from On Tour)	26	-	31	-	Their Second Album
1965	"Ring Dang Doo" b/w "Don't Try It" (Non-album track)	33	-	-	-	On Tour
1966	"Red Hot" b/w "A Long, Long Way" (Non-album track)	82	-	-	-	On Tour
1966	"Li'l Red Riding Hood" b/w "Love Me Like Before" (Non-album track)	2	-	2	46	Li'l Red Riding Hood
1966	"The Hair on My Chinny Chin Chin" b/w "(I'm in With) The Out Crowd"	22	-	13	-	The Best of Sam the Sham and the Pharaohs
1966	"How Do You Catch a Girl" b/w "The Love You Left Behind"	27	-	12	-	Non-album tracks
1967	"Oh That's Good, No That's Bad" b/w "Take What You Can Get"	54	-	52	-	Non-album tracks
1967	"Black Sheep" b/w "My Day's Gonna Come"	68	-	59	-	The Sam the Sham Revue
1968	"Old MacDonald Had a Boogaloo Farm" b/w "I Never Had No One" (Non-album track)	-	-	-	-	Ten of Pentacles
1969	"Wooly Bully" b/w "Ain't Gonna Move" (Non-album track); Re-release with standard MGM catalog number (14021)	-	-	-	-	Wooly Bully

As Sam the Sham:

Year	Titles (A-side, B-side)	US Hot 100	Album
1963	"Betty and Dupree" b/w "Man Child"	-	Non-album tracks
1964	"The Signafyin' Monkey" b/w "Juimonos (Let's Went)"	-	Non-album tracks
1964	"Haunted House" b/w "How Does a Cheating Woman Feel"	-	Non-album tracks
1967	"Banned in Boston" b/w "Money's My Problem"	117	Non-album tracks
1967	"Yakety Yak" b/w "Let Our Love Light Shine" (Non-album track)	110	Ten of Pentacles
1968	"I Couldn't Spell !!*@!" b/w "The Down Home Strut" (from Ten of Pentacles)	120	Non-album track
1973	"Fate" b/w "Oh Lo"	-	Non-album tracks
1977	"The Wookie, Part I" b/w Part II	-	Non-album tracks
1978	"Ain't No Lie" b/w "Baby, You Got It"	-	Non-album tracks

As Sam Samudio:

Year	Titles (A-side, B-side)	US Hot 100	Album
1970	"Key to the Highway" b/w "Me and Bobby McGee" (Non-album track)	-	Sam, Hard and Heavy
