= Liza Umarova =

Kazakh-Chechen singer (born 1965)

Liza Umarova Лиза Умарова
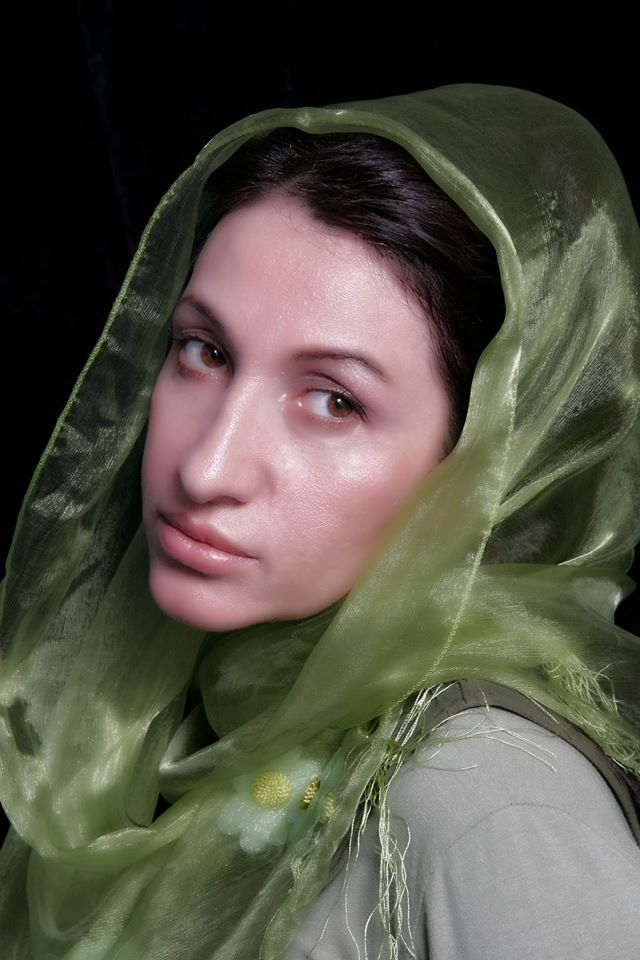
- Umarova in 2012

Background information
- Born: Liza Umarova; March 12, 1965 (age 61)
- Origin: Almaty, Kazakh SSR, Soviet Union
- Genres: Chechen music, pop music, torch song
- Occupations: Singer, actress
- Instrument: Vocals
- Years active: 1982–present

Liza Sulimovna Umarova (Chechen: Iумарийн ЙоI Лиза; born March 12, 1965) is a Chechen singer and actress.

== Early life ==
Liza spent her childhood in Almaty, Kazakhstan. Her parents had been removed from their native village of Katyr-Yurt, Chechnya in February 1944 as a result of the forced deportations of most Chechens to Central Asia. In 1982, her father decided to move the family back to Chechnya, and they settled in Grozny that year.

== Career ==
Liza attended the Yaroslavl Drama Institute, where she developed a solid reputation for her emotive singing, yet declined a musical career upon graduation to get married, and shortly afterwards became the mother of three children. In 1994 the family moved to Moscow after their house was bombed during the First Chechen War. In Moscow she opened up a small business called 'Vaynaham', which sold Chechen and Ingush literature and audio recordings. During this time, Liza separated from her husband and struggled to raise their children by herself.

In 1998 Liza made her first recording with the song "Motherland", which set words about Chechnya to the tune of "Liberta", a 1980s hit by Italian pop duo Al Bano and Romina Power. "I think it cost $50 [to make the recording]," she said. "I was sewing, earning money to feed the children at that time. I sewed sets of linen swaddling for newborn babies. And I had a lot of cloth, rolls of cotton. I sold all those rolls at the market, on the cheap, and made back the $50."

Liza then continued to make recordings of the First and Second Chechen Wars, with hit songs such as "Rise Up, Russia!", "Grozny, Hero City", and "Our Time Has Not Yet Come". In particular, the single "Grozny, Hero City" has been described as an anthem of Chechnya. She notes that when a melody comes to her, she sings it into her mobile telephone because she cannot read music and does not own a tape recorder.

Nevertheless, Liza says she sings because, "Music has always affected me emotionally, has always calmed me and has given me hope. People came up to me after a concert, when I performed in Chechnya, in Grozny, and said that these songs heal. Although they are tragic, in the end there is always something positive – hope for a good life."

== 2005 racially motivated assault ==
On September 6, 2005, Liza and her then-15-year-old son Murad were beaten in Moscow on their way to the metro by four drunken men, aged between 25 and 30. Umarova and her son sustained numerous contusions in the attack but initially decided against reporting the incident to the police.

"You will not live in this country," one of the attackers told Umarova, she said in an interview with Gazeta.ru newspaper. She said the attacker gave her "the word of an officer".

Umarova is not a Chechen nationalist and said she was ashamed for her country, Russia, over this kind of bigotry and over the continuing brutal war. When she sings the line, "You will be free, Chechnya," in "Motherland," she has in mind "free from war, from violence, from barbarism", rather than a call for independence, she said.

In an article published on April 4, 2006, The Moscow News reported that three of the attackers had been given guilty verdicts by a Moscow court. The sentences ranged from a one-year suspended sentence to three years at a prison settlement. After the defendants contested the decision, the case was sent for retrial, but the Moscow City Court upheld the previous verdict.

== External links and sources ==
- Liza Umarova Music Video
- New York Times Article on Liza Umarova
- International Herald Tribune Article on Liza Umarova
- Correspondents Report Interview with Liza Umarova
- Segment of The Moscow Times article of assault on Umarova
- Chechnya Free.ru Article on Liza Umarova
- ex-Soviet Union Music Blogspot Article
- Interview with Umarova by Anna Politkovskaya (in Russian)
