= Wild Things! =

Studio album by The Ventures
- Released: September 17, 1966
- Recorded: 1966
- Genre: Instrumental rock
- Length: 25:35
- Label: Dolton
- Producer: Joe Saraceno

The Ventures chronology
| Go with the Ventures (1966) | Wild Things! (1966) | Guitar Freakout (1967) |

Professional ratings
Review scores
| Source | Rating |
|---|---|
| AllMusic | 3/5 stars |

Wild Things! is a 1966 studio album by American band the Ventures, released on Dolton Records BLP-2047 (mono) and BST-8047. A 4-track reel-to-reel release was subsequently issued by Music Tapes, Inc. The album is noted for its marked turn towards a heavier sound in comparison to earlier Ventures releases, and the standout track Wild Child which was prominently featured as a sample in "Start the Commotion" by The Wiseguys.

== Background ==
Recorded directly after completing a tour of the central United States in the summer of 1966, the album presents The Ventures updating their sound to a "mod, go-go" style. Allmusic notes that the album is consistently "hard-edged" thanks to fuzztone Mosrites, and that the original instrumentals are better than throw-a ways. Leading off the album is a cover of The Troggs' "Wild Thing". The track features a "vocal" by Don Wilson, doing an impersonation of Peter Lorre reciting parts of the original lyrics, to humorous effect. The next track, "Fuzzy and Wild", is the first of the original instrumentals, each of which included the word "wild" in the title. "Wild and Wooly" was not a Ventures original, but was originally called "Murfreesboro" by its composer, Danny Hamilton. Perhaps the oddest title belongs to "How Now Wild Cow", a play on the phrase of elocution suggested by one of Mel Taylor's sons.

=== "Wild Child" ===
The track "Wild Child", featuring a "catchy guitar loop", was prominently featured in The Wiseguys' 1999 song "Start the Commotion". The Wiseguys' recording was subsequently used in a television commercial for Mitsubishi automobiles, and in a promo for Ally McBeal; this exposure ushered in a new chapter into the Ventures' career. The Ventures were alerted to the track in August 1998 when Ventures fan Peter Malski contacted Fiona Taylor from his office at 7 Double 5 Management in the UK. The Ventures confirmed with EMI that they owned rights to their composition, and subsequently received two-thirds of the writing royalties for "Start the Commotion". Additional income for The Ventures came in the form of synchronization rights from the song. The Ventures at this point realized that royalties from their back catalog, as well as performing new music specifically designed for use in multimedia productions, could produce a significant source of additional income.

== Reception ==
Wild Things! first appeared on the Billboard Top Albums chart on September 17, 1966. It maintained a position on this chart for a sum of 26 weeks, achieving a top position of #33. Allmusic gives a mildly favorable rating to the album, but compares it unfavorably to some earlier Ventures records.

== Track listing ==
| No. | Title | Writer(s) | Length |
|---|---|---|---|
| 1. | "Wild Thing" | Chip Taylor | 2:13 |
| 2. | "Fuzzy and Wild" | Bob Bogle, Nokie Edwards, Mel Taylor, Don Wilson | 2:25 |
| 3. | "Sweet Pea" | Tommy Roe | 1:55 |
| 4. | "Wild and Wooly" | Danny Hamilton | 2:11 |
| 5. | "Wild Child" | Bogle, Edwards, Taylor, Wilson | 2:09 |
| 6. | "Summer in the City" | John Sebastian, Mark Sebastian, Steve Boone | 2:22 |
| 7. | "The Pied Piper" | Artie Kornfeld, Steve Duboff | 1:55 |
| 8. | "Wild Trip" | Bogle, Edwards, Taylor, Wilson | 2:05 |
| 9. | "Hanky Panky" | Jeff Barry, Ellie Greenwich | 2:00 |
| 10. | "Wildcat" | Bogle, Edwards, Taylor, Wilson | 2:08 |
| 11. | "How Now Wild Cow" | Bogle, Edwards, Taylor, Wilson | 2:06 |
| 12. | "The Work Song" | Nat Adderley, Oscar Brown Jr. | 2:06 |
| Total length: | | | 25:35 |

== Personnel ==
=== Ventures ===
- Don Wilson – rhythm and lead guitar
- Nokie Edwards – lead guitar
- Bob Bogle – bass, lead guitar
- Mel Taylor – drums

=== Technical ===
- Joe Saraceno – producer
- Ami Hadani – engineer
- Woody Woodward – art director
- Peter Whorf – cover photography
