= Walk, Don't Run, Vol. 2 =

Studio album by The Ventures
- Released: October 10, 1964
- Recorded: 1964
- Genres: Instrumental rock, surf
- Length: 29:04
- Label: Dolton
- Producer: Dick Glasser

The Ventures chronology
The Fabulous Ventures (1964)	Walk, Don't Run, Vol. 2 (1964)	The Ventures Knock Me Out! (1965)

Singles from I'm Still in Love with You
- 1. "Walk Don't Run '64" Released: June 8, 1964

Walk, Don't Run, Vol. 2 is the 16th studio album by The Ventures, released in 1964. It features "Walk Don't Run '64," an updated recording of the Johnny Smith cover; as a single, it would be the second time the band had a Top 10 hit in the U.S. with that same composition. The album also includes a rendition of blues classic "The House of the Rising Sun," and "Rap City," the Ventures' arrangement of Brahms' Hungarian Dance No. 5.

== Background ==
The original Walk, Don't Run album cover from 1960 featured employees from Liberty Records' stockroom (subbing for The Ventures who were on tour at the time), falling over instruments behind a walking model. For the new album, the genuine group is shown on the floor in more relaxed poses. The model standing in front of them is Nancy Bacon, who was guitarist Don Wilson's wife at the time.

The new Walk, Don't Run, Vol. 2 album was another hit for The Ventures, peaking at #17 on Billboard and #18 on Cashbox.

== Reception ==
Professional ratings
Review scores
Source	Rating
Allmusic	3/5 stars
Record Mirror	3/5 stars

In his review for Allmusic, critic Fred Thomas called the album "the standard Ventures experience, though a bit on the livelier side in its song selections... All said, most Ventures records are pretty similar, but the bright moments on Walk, Don't Run, Vol. 2 hint at the band relaxing and having a little bit more fun than usual."

== Track listing ==
=== Side one ===
1. "House of the Rising Sun" (Traditional) – 2:59
2. "Diamond Head" (Danny Hamilton) – 2:06
3. "Night Train" (Jimmy Forrest) – 2:34
4. "Peach Fuzz" (Ventures) – 2:24
5. "Rap City" (Johannes Brahms, arr: Ventures) – 2:03
6. "Blue Star" (Edward Heyman, Victor Young) – 2:17

=== Side two ===
1. "Walk, Don't Run '64" (Johnny Smith) – 2:27
2. "Night Walk" (Ventures) – 2:36
3. "One Mint Julep" (Rudy Toombs) – 2:17
4. "Pedal Pusher" (Ventures) – 2:30
5. "The Creeper" (Ventures) – 2:23
6. "Stranger on the Shore" (Acker Bilk, Robert Mellin) – 2:28

== Personnel ==
=== Ventures ===
- Bob Bogle – bass
- Don Wilson – guitar
- Nokie Edwards – guitar
- Mel Taylor – drums

=== Technical ===
- Dick Glasser – producer
- “Lanky” Linstrot – engineer
- Eddie Brackett – engineer
- Jim Lockert – engineer
- Henry Lewy – engineer
