= The Ventures in Space =

Studio album by the Ventures
- Released: January 25, 1964
- Recorded: October 1963
- Genre: Surf
- Length: 27:26
- Label: Dolton
- Producer: Robert Reisdorff

The Ventures chronology
Let's Go! (1963)	The Ventures in Space (1964)	The Fabulous Ventures (1964)

Singles from The Ventures in Space
- 1. "Penetration" Released: 1963

The Ventures in Space is an LP album by the guitar-based instrumental group the Ventures, released in 1964. Information on its jacket states that "All of these unusual & other-worldly sounds have been created with musical instruments rather than electronic gimmicks". It was one of the first albums on which the group played the new Mosrite brand guitars instead of their traditional Fender instruments. The album was released in 1964 on the Dolton label, and reissued in the late 1970s by Pickwick Records (with a new cover depicting an astronaut performing a spacewalk). Side Two/Track 5 "The Fourth Dimension" was a previously released single by The Frantics as "Werewolf" (Dolton Records No. 16)

== Reception ==
Professional ratings
Review scores
Source	Rating
Allmusic	3/5 stars

In his review for Allmusic, critic Richie Unterberger wrote of the album "Few listeners need to dig deeper than a greatest-hits collection for the Ventures, but this early effort is an arguable exception... The British instrumental group the Tornados (of "Telstar" fame) did this kind of stuff better, but Ventures in Space is a fun diversion from their usual sound that holds up well."

== Track listing ==
=== Side one ===
1. "Out of Limits" (Michael Z. Gordon) – 2:14
2. "He Never Came Back" (Don Wilson, Mel Taylor, Nokie Edwards, Bob Bogle) – 2:06
3. "Moon Child" (Cissy Wechter, Julius Wechter) – 2:07
4. "Fear" (Harry Lubin) – 2:24
5. "Exploration in Terror" (Wilson, Edwards, Bogle) – 2:14
6. "War of the Satellites" (Danny Hamilton) – 1:57

=== Side two ===
1. "The Bat" (Lou Forbes) – 2:14
2. "Penetration" (Steve Leonard) – 2:10
3. "Love Goddess of Venus" (Wilson) – 2:35
4. "Solar Race" (Wilson, Edwards, Bogle) – 2:34
5. "The Fourth Dimension" (Gary Hodge, Terry Wadsworth) – 2:15
6. "Twilight Zone" (Marty Manning) – 2:36

== Personnel ==
=== Ventures ===
- Don Wilson – guitar
- Nokie Edwards – guitar
- Bob Bogle – bass
- Mel Taylor – drums

=== Additional musicians ===
- Red Rhodes – pedal steel guitar

=== Technical ===
- Robert Reisdorff – producer
- Eddie Brackett – engineer
