= Twist with the Ventures =

Studio album by The Ventures
- Released: January 20, 1962
- Recorded: 1961
- Genre: Instrumental Rock
- Length: 26:19
- Label: Dolton Records
- Producers: Josie Wilson & Bob Reisdorff

The Ventures chronology
The Colorful Ventures (1961)	Twist with the Ventures (1962)	Twist Party, Volume 2 (1962)

Alternate cover
- Alternate cover for retitled album

Twist with the Ventures is the fifth studio album by the band The Ventures; released in 1962 on Dolton Records BST 8010 (stereo) and BLP 2010 (monaural). It consists mostly of instrumental versions of popular dance tunes from the late 1950s to early 1960s, with a couple of original compositions. It was on the charts for 29 weeks and it peaked at # 24 on the Billboard 200. It was later retitled Dance! with new album cover. During the recording of this album, original drummer Howie Johnson left the band and was replaced by Mel Taylor, thus forming the classic Ventures lineup. Therefore, the drum credit(s) are shared on this album between both Johnson and Taylor.

== Track listing ==
Side one

1. "Ventures Twist" (Bob Bogle, Nokie Edwards, Don Wilson) – 1:59
2. "The Twist" (Hank Ballard) – 1:52
3. "Road Runner" (Rick Dangel, John Greek) – 2:42
4. "Gringo" (Gene Moles) – 2:30
5. "Moon Dawg" (Derry Weaver) – 2:21
6. "Guitar Twist" (Dick Glasser, Tommy Allsup) – 2:19

Side two

1. "Opus Twist" (Jerry Allison, Tommy Allsup) – 2:00
2. "Movin' And Groovin'" (Duane Eddy, Lee Hazlewood) – 2:04
3. "Sunny River" (Moles, Edwards) – 2:08
4. "Let's Twist Again" (Dave Appell, Kal Mann) – 2:15
5. "Shanghied" (Greek, Dangel) – 1:50
6. "Bumble Bee Twist" (Wilson, Edwards, Bogle) – 2:19

This is the track listing from the original album. On later releases, "Ventures Twist" was retitled "Driving Guitars", "Guitar Twist" was retitled "Raunchy Guitar", "Opus Twist" was retitled "Opus Four", and "Bumble Bee Twist" was retitled "The Wasp".

== Personnel ==
- Don Wilson – rhythm and lead guitar
- Nokie Edwards – lead guitar
- Bob Bogle – bass, lead guitar
- Mel Taylor – drums
- Tommy Allsup - lead guitar (tracks Sd 1-6, Sd 2-1)
