= The Ventures Play Telstar and the Lonely Bull =

Studio album by The Ventures
- Released: January 1963
- Recorded: 1962
- Genre: Surf rock
- Length: 27:43
- Label: Dolton
- Producer: Josie Wilson, Bob Reisdorff

The Ventures chronology
Going to the Ventures Dance Party! (1962)	The Ventures Play Telstar and the Lonely Bull (1963)	Surfing (1963)

The Ventures Play Telstar and the Lonely Bull is an album by the band the Ventures, released in 1963. It consists entirely of cover versions of popular instrumentals from the late 1950s to early 1960s (all of which reached the Top 15 on Billboard, including eleven Top Tens and three #1's) and became their highest charting album, peaking at #8 on Billboard and earning a gold record for over 500,000 copies sold.

== Reception ==
Professional ratings
Review scores
Source	Rating
Allmusic	3/5 stars

In his review for Allmusic, critic Fred Thomas wrote of the album "Despite a somewhat wooden performance on many of the tracks, the hard-panned stereo production makes for a very big sound. While reading somewhere between campy and nostalgic in the context of the decades that followed, The Ventures Play Telstar is still a high point in the band's overwhelming discography, and as strong a sample of early-'60s commercially viable surf rock as you're likely to find."

== Track listing ==
=== Side one ===
1. "Telstar" (Joe Meek) – 2:37
2. "The Lonely Bull" (Sol Lake) – 2:11
3. "Mexico" (Boudleaux Bryant) – 2:26
4. "Calcutta" (Heino Gaze) – 2:20
5. "Apache" (Jerry Lordan) – 3:08
6. "Never on Sunday" (Manos Hadjidakis) – 2:14

=== Side two ===
1. "Tequila" (Daniel Flores) – 2:24
2. "Green Onions" (Steve Cropper, Booker T. Jones, Al Jackson, Jr., Lewis Steinberg) – 2:05
3. "Percolator" (Ernie Freeman, Louis Bideau) – 2:14
4. "Red River Rock" (Fred Mendelshon, Ira Mack, Tom King) – 2:15
5. "Let There Be Drums" (Sandy Nelson, Richard Podolor) – 2:20
6. "Last Night" (Charles Axton, Floyd Newman, Gilbert C. Caple, Jerry Lee Smith, Chips Moman) – 2:29

== Personnel ==
As written on the back cover

- Don Wilson – rhythm and lead guitar
- Nokie Edwards – lead guitar (as "base guitar")
- Bob Bogle – bass, lead guitar
- Mel Taylor – drums

At the point that Edwards ceased strictly playing "base" (as spelled on the cover), he became the chief guitarist, and co-founder Bogle settled on bass.
