= Another Smash!!! =

Studio album by The Ventures
- Released: June 26, 1961
- Recorded: May 1961
- Genre: Surf rock
- Length: 26:46
- Label: Dolton BLP/BST 2006
- Producer: Josie Wilson, Rob Reisdorff

The Ventures chronology
| The Ventures (1961) | Another Smash!!! (1961) | The Colorful Ventures (1961) |

Singles from Another Smash!!!
- 1. "Lonely Heart" Released: June 1961; 2. "Lullaby of the Leaves/Ginchy" Released: September 1961

Professional ratings
Review scores
| Source | Rating |
|---|---|
| Allmusic | 3.5/5 stars |
| New Record Mirror | 3/5 |

Another Smash!!! is the third studio album by the Ventures, released in 1961 on Dolton Records.

== Reception ==
This album entered the Billboard Top LPs chart on June 26, 1961, and remained on the chart for fourteen weeks, peaking at number 39.

== Track listing ==
1. "(Ghost) Riders in the Sky" (Stan Jones) – 2:28
2. "Wheels" (Jimmy Torres, Richard Stephens) – 1:55
3. "Lonely Heart" (Bob Bogle, Don Wilson) – 2:10
4. "Bulldog" (George Tomsco) – 2:20
5. "Lullaby of the Leaves" (Bernice Petkere, Joe Young) – 1:58
6. "Beyond the Reef" (Jack Pitman) – 3:05
7. "Raw-Hide" (Mark Grant, Link Wray) – 2:29
8. "Meet Mister Callahan" (Eric Spear) – 2:20
9. "Trambone" (Chet Atkins) – 2:04
10. "Last Date" (Floyd Cramer) – 2:13
11. "Ginchy" (Bert Weedon) – 1:40
12. "Josie" (Bogle, Wilson) – 2:04

== Personnel ==
- Don Wilson – rhythm guitar and lead guitar (lead on track 1)
- Nokie Edwards – bass guitar, lead guitar (lead on track 7)
- Bob Bogle – bass guitar, lead guitar (lead on all other tracks)
- Howie Johnson – drums
