= Gene Moles =

American guitarist

- Bakersfield sound compilation (267 Records)

Background information
- Born: Denver Eugene Moles Sr. June 1, 1928; Wetumka, Oklahoma
- Died: April 28, 2002 (aged 73) Bakersfield, California
- Genres: Surf rock; pop instrumentals
- Occupations: musician; composer; luthier
- Instrument: electric guitar
- Label: Challenge
- Spouse: Joan Moles

Gene Moles (1928-2002) was an American guitarist, active in the pop and surf music scene of the 1960s.

== Early life ==
Denver Eugene "Gene" Moles Sr., the sixth of seven children, was born on 1 June 1928 in Wetumka, Oklahoma, sixteen miles from Henryetta. His family moved to Selma, just south of Fresno, in 1936. Gene got his first guitar seven years later at age 15.

== Musical career ==
In 1946, Moles joined the house band at the Paris Gardens nightclub in Selma, owned by a woman known as Texas Mom, where he was earning $3 a night. After three years, he moved to Bakersfield, in September 1949, and joined Tex Butler's band, which featured pianist George French, who were appearing at the Blackboard club. He was getting paid $10 a night. The regionally successful Jimmy Thomason Show on television made him a local celebrity in 1953. By that time, he had acquired a "solid reputation," which led Capitol Records to engage him from 1959 onward at their Hollywood studios to work as a session musician. Among the many tracks Moles played in was "Sweet Thing" by Buck Owens, while he also played with Merle Haggard, Red Simpson, Tex Ritter, and many others.

In 1961, Moles and Nokie Edwards of The Ventures co-wrote "Night Run" that was recorded by them as The Marksmen; it was subsequently recorded also by The Mustangs. Moles and Edwards composed the tune "Scratch", which was recorded by The Ventures in 1962 and then by The Surf Coasters in 1995. They wrote "Sunny River" and "Gringo," both recorded by The Ventures for their album Twist with the Ventures in 1961. Years later, the album was reissued as Dance.

In 1964, the single "Burnin' Rubber" was released on Challenge, featuring sound effects from real drag races under Noles' signature "twang-heavy sound of trucker country", "dry" guitar style, which had helped define the "Bakersfield sound." The single failed to chart at the time, but subsequently featured in numerous compilations and is considered an "influential" offering of the surf music era.

Along with his work in music, Moles also worked as chief inspector in the Bakersfield small production-plant of Mosrite guitars. The Mosrites were used by people like Barbara Mandrell, Little Jimmy Dickens and Joe Maphis, as well as The Ventures who used a Mark-1 mode that Mosrite, in 1963, named "The Ventures Model." (Note: The Ventures first used Mosrites in the album The Ventures in Space.) The plant went out of business in 1969 (Note: After 1969, the plant area was developed into the Centennial Garden, and, eventually housed the Mechanics Bank Arena.) and Moles opened a guitar-repair shop he named "Gene Moles - Doctor of Guitars," moving it, in 1991, to Niles Street. He operated the workshop until the end of his life.

== Personal life ==
Gene and Joan Moles were married in 1956 and had four children: Daughters Kathryn Scheer, and Marisa Blomberg, and sons Eugene Jr. and Jody. Both sons became guitarists. Eugene Jr., who lives in Nashville, has played at the Grand Ole Opry and on Hee Haw.

== Death ==
Gene Moles died Sunday 28 April 2002 from pulmonary fibrosis, a progressive lung disease, at his home in Bakersfield, California.

== Selected discography ==
=== Singles ===
| Title | Artists | Label | Serial Number | Year |
|---|---|---|---|---|
| Batmobile // Batusi (Note: Both sides of the release are identical to the Challenge single "Burning Rubber"/"Twin Pipes") | The Bats (Note: Gene Moles and back-up musicians) | Flame | T4 km-5155 | 1961 |
| Kaha Huna (Goddess of Surfing) // Maria (The Wind) | Gene Moles & The Softwinds | Garpax | GP-44189 | 1963 |
| Burning Rubber // Twin Pipes | Gene Moles & The Softwinds | Challenge | GP-1107 | 1964 |

== See also ==
- Dick Dale
- Link Wray
- List of surf musicians
- Drag racing

== Bibliography ==
- Dalley, Robert J. (1988). Surfin' Guitars: Instrumental Surf Bands of the Sixties. Surf Publications. ISBN 9780913944042.
