= Walk, Don't Run (The Ventures album) =

Studio album by The Ventures
- Released: December 5, 1960
- Recorded: 1960
- Studio: Joe Boles Custom Recorders, Seattle, Washington
- Genre: Rock and roll; R&B; surf
- Length: 27:00
- Label: Dolton
- Producer: Bob Reisdorff

The Ventures chronology
Walk, Don't Run (1960)	The Ventures (1961)

Walk, Don't Run (sometimes stylized as Walk – Don't Run) is the debut studio album by American instrumental surf rock band the Ventures, released in 1960 by Dolton Records. It features cover versions of well-known songs, as well as original compositions.

Much of the album was recorded following the success of the hit single of the same name. It was recorded at Joe Boles' home studio in Seattle, Washington, as was their second album, The Ventures. His was a local studio where other early Dolton artists also recorded.

Released on Liberty's Dolton subsidiary in December 1960, Walk, Don't Run became a big seller, peaking at number 11 on Billboard and earning a gold record for the Ventures (the first of three) for over 500,000 copies sold.

== Cover ==
The Ventures were on one of their first tours as Liberty Records began compiling their first album and were still on the road by the time of the front cover photo shoot. As a result, four employees from Liberty's stockroom (with two wearing sunglasses) were posed as if they were falling or tripping over instruments with model Barbara Grimes walking in front of them. A photo of the actual Ventures was originally featured on the back cover, but to avoid possible confusion when compared to the stand-ins on the front cover, it was replaced with an outline-drawn version of the same photo.

In 1969, the album was reissued by Liberty (having discontinued the Dolton label two years earlier but kept the original stereo catalog number), featuring an updated photo of the group. By that time, the lineup consisted of Don Wilson, Bob Bogle, Gerry McGee, Mel Taylor, and John Durrill, though only the former two appear on the album. The back cover with the outline drawing of the original photo was kept intact.

== Reception ==
Professional ratings
Review scores
Source	Rating
Allmusic	3/5 stars

In his review for Allmusic, critic Bruce Eder wrote the album "is surprisingly good, considering that it was recorded in a huge rush during an era when all concerned couldn't help but know that rock and roll albums (apart from those by Elvis Presley) generally didn't sell very well; indeed, the fact that this is so good speaks volumes about the class and talent of the group at this early point in their history."

== Track listing ==
=== Side 1 ===
1. "Morgen" (Peter Mosser, Noel Sherman) – 2:07
2. "Raunchy" (William E. Justis Jr.) – 2:16
3. "Home" (Harry Clarkson, Jeff Clarkson, Peter van Steeden) – 2:18
4. "My Own True Love (Tara's Theme)" (Max Steiner) – 2:14
5. "The Switch" (Bob Bogle, Nokie Edwards, Howard Johnson, Don Wilson) – 1:56
6. "Walk, Don't Run" (Johnny Smith) – 2:03

=== Side 2 ===
7. "Night Train" (Jimmy Forrest, Lewis Simpkins, Oscar Washington) – 2:50
8. "No Trespassing" (Bogle, Edwards, Wilson, Johnson) – 1:58
9. "Caravan" (Duke Ellington, Irving Mills, Juan Tizol) – 2:09
10. "Sleepwalk" (Ann Farina, John Farina, Santo Farina) – 2:04
11. "The McCoy" (Bogle, Wilson) – 2:07
12. "Honky Tonk" (Billy Butler, Bill Doggett, Johnnie Scott, Shep Shepherd) – 2:44

== Personnel ==
=== The Ventures ===
- Don Wilson – rhythm guitar (lead on track 4)
- Bob Bogle – lead guitar and bass (bass on tracks 2, 5, 7, and 8)
- Nokie Edwards – bass and lead guitar (lead on tracks 2, 5, 7, and 8)
- Howie Johnson – drums
- Skip Moore – drums on tracks 3 and 6

=== Technical ===
- Bob Reisdorff – producer
- Joe Boles – engineer
- Garrett-Howard Inc – photography (front cover)
- Pate/Francis and Associates – cover design
