= Bob Spalding (musician) =

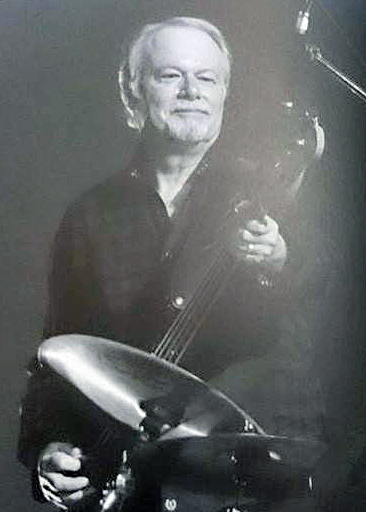
- Bob Spalding performing in Japan

Background information
- Born: Robert Eugene Spalding; 10 February 1947 (age 79); San Bernardino, California, USA.
- Genres: Instrumental rock; rock; surf; jazz
- Occupations: Musician; composer; arranger; record producer
- Instruments: Guitar; bass; banjo
- Years active: 1962 – present
- Member of: The Ventures
- Formerly of: Mel Taylor and the Dynamics, Sweet Pain, The Nomads

Robert Eugene Spalding (born February 10, 1947) is an American musician, composer, arranger, and producer. He is best known for his work with Rock and Roll Hall of Fame group the Ventures and he has appeared on over 40 Ventures albums from 1980 through to the present. Spalding continues to tour, record, as well as produce with the Ventures as well as other artists.

== Early career ==
Spalding saw the Ventures, Bob Bogle and Don Wilson, on stage on their first visit to Japan in 1962 and he was very impressed with their performance. This inspired him further in learning to play the guitar, while never imagining that he would, in the future, become a member of the Ventures and he would return to Japan many times on tour with them. His father had been posted to Japan with the Military and the Spalding family lived there for three years. After the family returned to the US later in 1962, Spalding played in his first band, the Nomads, all through High School in Austin, Texas. The Nomads were his first experience with recording and producing. The band, featuring his older brother Perry Spalding on drums, recorded several unreleased singles and one album. However, before the group could capitalise on their full commercial potential, Spalding was drafted into the army. After tour of duty in Vietnam, he enrolled in college where he received a major in business and a minor in Marketing. After graduating from college in San Bernardino, he continued to play with various California bands and to submit his original compositions to music publishing companies in Los Angeles.

== Starting in the music business ==
=== Sweet Pain ===
In 1970, Spalding had an opportunity to join a group that was poised to sign a recording contract with Liberty Records. The group, Sweet Pain, completed their first album after Spalding joined the group and they toured the US as an opening act for many established artists. When the group was in Southern California they played regularly at the famous Golden Bear in Huntington Beach, where they often opened for established acts like Linda Ronstadt, War, and the Nitty Gritty Dirt Band, and where Spalding once had the experience of playing in the backup band for Chuck Berry. Sweet Pain recorded two additional singles as well as a second unreleased album before the band left United Artists Records. However, prior to them leaving, the group used the pseudonym Dolphin Market to record an instrumental entitled "Diego".

=== Mel Taylor and the Dynamics ===
While working at United Artists, Bob had the opportunity to meet the Ventures and to attend some of their recording and rehearsal sessions. He became friends with Mel Taylor, drummer for the group, which would soon prove fortunate for Bob, as he had recently been released from a record company contract at United Artists and he was looking for another opportunity. Bob was then invited to join Mel Taylor, who had left the Ventures to pursue a solo career as Mel Taylor and the Dynamics, with Bob playing rhythm guitar. The group toured Japan in 1973 and they recorded two albums with Bob playing both electric and acoustic guitars. By 1980, Mel Taylor had rejoined the Ventures and Bob Spalding was regularly asked to play additional guitar on recording sessions for the Ventures.

== The Ventures and beyond ==
Spalding's extensive recording studio work for the Ventures since 1980 resulted in him often being referred to as "The 5th Venture". He also deputised regularly on guitar or bass guitar for the Ventures on live concerts until 2005 when he joined the band permanently when Bob Bogle retired from touring. On March 10, 2008, the Ventures were inducted into the Rock and Roll Hall of Fame at a ceremony held at the Waldorf-Astoria Hotel in New York. Bob Bogle was unable to attend, so Spalding accepted the award on his behalf and he performed with the Ventures live on stage at the event. Spalding had initially taken over from Bob Bogle in 2005 playing bass guitar for recording purposes and for their annual tour of Japan, but following the retirement of Gerry McGee in 2017, Spalding took over from him as lead guitarist of the Ventures with Leon Taylor (drums), Ian Spalding (rhythm guitar), and Luke Griffin (bass guitar) completing the band.

=== Recognition and awards ===
- For his US Army Service, Spalding was awarded the National Defense Service Medal, the Vietnam Service Medal, the Vietnam Campaign Medal with 60 device, and 2 O/S Bars for his service during the Vietnam War and the 1968 Tet Offensive.
- He was recognised by the Ventures to accept the Rock and Roll Hall of Fame Induction for Bob Bogle in 2008.
- In 2011, Spalding was recognised by the Bogle family to accept the award at the induction of Bob Bogle into the Oklahoma Music Hall of Fame.
- In June 2010, Spalding and the other members of the Ventures were awarded the prestigious Order of the Rising Sun medal by the Emperor of Japan for their contributions to Japanese Culture.

== Original compositions ==
Spalding has composed over 75 songs. Many have been recorded by the Ventures and other artists.

=== Recorded by Bob Spalding ===
- Night Bird, Catalina Magic, Premonition, Bananaz, Edge of Forever, Hop-Scotch, V.B. Normal, Tsunami, Rainbow Girl on The World is a Curious Place. Cassette tape. Big Dog/Little Dog BDLD-C001. 1990. USA.
- Rachel, Red Sunset, The Jaguar, Long Boards, Gray Shadows, Opus for Guitar in A Minor on The 5th Venture. CD. M&I Company. MYCV-30335. 2005. Japan.
- Issa's Treasure, Catalina Sun, Spider's Web, Casa Blanco on The 5th Venture. CD. Big Dog/Little Dog BDLD-003. 2007. USA.
- Chevy 396, Unheard Voices, Transition, Friends, The Long Walk Home, Epigraphical Likeness, Outlaw Hills, The Broken Road on Transitions. CD. Category 1 Music. CAT I 1003. 2012. USA.

=== Recorded by the Ventures ===
- Blue Dawn on the single Venture 25 / Blue Dawn. Tridex 502. 1982. USA.
- Stompers, Spindrift on the vinyl album Stars on Guitars. Tridex TDX 1245. 1982. USA.
- Columbia on the NASA 25th Anniversary Album. CD. Allegiance CDP 72873. 1983. USA.
- Flashback, Strawberry Brandy, Cartoon, Snows of Nagano on the CD Flyin’ High. Toshiba-EMI TOCP-7239. 1992. Japan.
- Shonan Shores on the CD Mega Hits. Toshiba-EMI TOCP-7847. 1993. Japan.
- Web Surfin' on the CD Wild Again 2. Toshiba-EMI TOCP-50220. 1997. Japan.
- Blue Dawn, Kanari Kiteru Koi, Flower of the Sun, Trailblazer on the CD New Depths. GNP Crescendo GNPD 2259. 1999. USA.
- Jewel, Night Bird, Bermuda, Mal-Funk-Shun on the CD Walk don't Run 2000. M&I Company MYCV-30002. 1999. Japan.
- Bimini Bay on the CD V-Gold III. M&I Company MYCV-30092. 2001. Japan.
- Echoes of Sendai, Sapporo Spring, Japan Surf on the CD Memories of Japan. Toshiba-EMI TOCP-71298. 2012. Japan.
- Rincon, Magic Kids, Leviathan, Crouching Lion, V-Ray on the CD Then, Now, and Forever. M&I Company MYCV-30639. 2013. Japan.
- Go-Go Wave on the CD Go Go Best plus. M&I Company MYCV-30643. 2014 Japan.
- Big Surf, Vladivostok on the CD Hits and New. M&I Company MYCV-30654. 2016. Japan.
- Night in F Minor, Bahia de Los Angeles, Ame no Kyoto, Infinite Monkey, Evening Shadows, Fire Lights, Dark Eyes, Here we go again! on the CD Here we go again! M&I Company MYCV-30659. 2018. Japan.
- Moon Base Drive, The Alien, Space Suit, The Mercury Run, Sea of Tranquility, Pi, Last Party on the Moon on the CD New Space. M&I Company MYCV-30669. 2022. Japan.

=== Recorded by other artists ===
- Grand Slalom (Columbia) by Bernard Arcadio on Meldac Mel-12. Vinyl album. 1986. Japan.
- Blue Dawn by Mari Henmi on Bel-Age with the Ventures. CD. Panam CRCP20044. 1992. Japan.
- Blue Dawn (Minato No Hinageshi) by Mari Henmi on Kayo Taizen CD. M&I Company MYCV-30007. 1999. Japan.
- Kozakai Warrior by the Charades on the Wild Cards CD. Power GPCD023-2. 2008. Finland.
- Bullet Wave by BCV on Harashouten Hara00001. 2012. Japan.
- Sendai Dream by BCV on Harashouten Hara00001. 2012. Japan.
- Hazy Hollow by Janne Haavisto on Mufarang International Mufa-22. 2017. Finland.
- Night Bird, I will Return by Gerry McGee on Gerry McGee Forever CD. M&I Company MYCV-30670. 2022. Japan.

== Discography ==
=== Bob Spalding solo record releases ===
- The World is a Curious Place. Cassette tape. Big Dog/Little Dog BDLD-C001. 1990. USA.
- The 5th Venture. CD. M&I Company. MYCV-30335. 2005. Japan.
- The 5th Venture. CD. Big Dog/Little Dog BDLD-003. 2007. USA.
- Transitions. CD. Category 1 Music. CAT I 1003. 2012. USA.

=== Sweet Pain ===
- Sweet Pain. Vinyl album. United Artists UAS 6793. 1970. USA.
- Upside-down, Inside-out Woman / Berkeley Lady. Single. United Artists 50761. 1970. USA.
- Diego / The Witness. Single. Recorded as Dolphin Market. Avalanche 36009. 1972. USA.

=== Mel Taylor and the Dynamics ===
- Mel Taylor and the Dynamics. Roll over Beethoven. Vinyl album. Dan VC-7510. 1974. Japan.
- Mel Taylor and the Dynamics. Live in Japan ’73. CD. Bad News Records BNCY-29. 1997. Japan.

=== The Ventures ===
- Stars on Guitars. Tridex TDX 1245. Vinyl album. 1982. USA.
- NASA 25th Anniversary Album. CD. Allegiance CDP 72873. 1983. USA.
- The Orange Sisters with the Ventures. CD. Moon Records. Moon 20823. 1984. Japan.
- The Compact Ventures. CD. Garland GRZ003. 1987. USA.
- Radical Guitars. CD. Iloki ILCD1006. 1987. USA.
- The Ventures play Southern All Stars. CD. Toshiba-EMI TOCP-6110. 1990. Japan.
- The Ventures play Seaside Story. CD. Toshiba-EMI TOCP-6740. 1991. Japan.
- The Ventures play Major Motion Pictures. CD. Toshiba-EMI TOCP-6775. 1991. Japan.
- Tokyo Calling (60’s Pops in Japan). CD. Toshiba-EMI TOCT-6378. 1992. Japan.
- Flyin’ High. CD. Toshiba-EMI TOCP-7239. 1992. Japan.
- Mega Hits. CD. Toshiba-EMI TOCP-7847. 1993. Japan.
- Wild Again 2. CD. Toshiba-EMI TOCP-50220. 1997. Japan.
- Space 2001. CD. M&I Company MYCV-30006. 1999. Japan.
- New Depths. CD. GNP Crescendo GNPD 2259. 1999. USA.
- Walk don't Run 2000. CD. M&I Company MYCV-30002. 1999. Japan.
- The Ventures play Runaway (Don Wilson's favourite songs). CD. M&I Company. MYCV-30005. 1999. Japan.
- Acoustic Rock. CD. M&I Company MYCV-30047. 2000. Japan.
- The Ventures play Southern All Stars - Tsunami. CD. M&I Company MYCV-30093. 2001. Japan.
- 60's Rocking’ Christmas. CD. M&I Company MYCV-30123. 2001. Japan.
- Christmas Joy. CD. Varese Sarabande 302066 4012. 2002. USA.
- Your Hit Parade 60's. CD. M&I Company MYCV-30195. 2003. Japan.
- J-Rock Summer Wind. CD. M&I Company MYCV-30333. 2005. Japan.
- Your Hit Parade II. CD. M&I Company MYCV-30384. 2006. Japan.
- Live in Tokyo. CD. M&I Company MYCV-30421. 2006. Japan.
- Rocky. CD. Toshiba-EMI TOCP-70259. 2007. Japan.
- The Ventures and the Wailers. Two-Car Garage. CD. Blue Horizon BH 100–1. 2009. USA.
- The Ventures play Kayama Yuzo. CD. Toshiba-EMI TOCP-70735. 2009. Japan.
- Hawaii 5-0 – Original Artists New Recording. CD. VentureX Music VXM 102. 2010. USA.
- In My Life - the Ventures play the Beatles. CD. Toshiba-EMI TOCP-70839. 2010. Japan.
- The Ventures in Japan Live 2000. CD. M&I Company MYCV-30588. 2011. Japan.
- Bob Bogle Memorial Album. CD. Toshiba-EMI TOCP-71095. 2011. Japan.
- Memories of Japan. CD. Toshiba-EMI TOCP-71298. 2012. Japan.
- Then, Now, and Forever. CD. M&I Company MYCV-30639. 2013. Japan.
- The Ventures play Yuming. CD. Toshiba-EMI TOCP- 71548. 2013. Japan.
- Sounds of Summer. CD. Universal Music Group UICY-15332. 2014. Japan.
- Go Go Best plus. CD. M&I Company MYCV-30643. 2014 Japan.
- Hits and New. CD. M&I Company MYCV-30654. 2016. Japan.
- Here we go again. CD. M&I Company MYCV-30659. 2018. Japan.
- The Ventures Live at Daryl's House Club. CD. M&I Company MYCV-30664. 2019. Japan.
- The Ventures 60th Anniversary Best Album. CD. M&I Company MYCV-30665. 2019. Japan.
- New Space CD. M&I Company MYCV-30669. 2022. Japan.
