= Walk, Don't Run =

Walk, Don't Run may refer to:

== Music ==
- "Walk, Don't Run" (instrumental), written and originally recorded by Johnny Smith, 1954; covered by Chet Atkins (1956) and the Ventures (1960)
- Walk, Don't Run (The Ventures album), 1960
- Walk Don't Run (Joshua Breakstone album), 1992
- Walk, Don't Run (soundtrack), by Quincy Jones, from the 1966 film

== Film and television ==
- Walk, Don't Run (film), a 1966 American romantic comedy film
- "Walk Don't Run", a season one episode of the American animated comedy television series The Casagrandes
- "Walk, Don't Run", an episode of the Star Trek: Very Short Treks series of promotional short films

== See also ==
- Don't Run (disambiguation)
