= Lahoma, Oklahoma =

- Town
- Location in Garfield County and the state of Oklahoma.
- Coordinates: 36°23′17″N 98°05′25″W
- Country: United States
- State: Oklahoma
- County: Garfield

Area
  - Total: 0.21 sq mi (0.55 km^{2})
  - Land: 0.21 sq mi (0.55 km^{2})
  - Water: 0 sq mi (0.00 km^{2})
- Elevation: 1,247 ft (380 m)

Population (2020)
  - Total: 539
  - Density: 2,561/sq mi (988.7/km^{2})
- Time zone: UTC-6 (Central (CST))
  - Summer (DST): UTC-5 (CDT)
- ZIP code: 73754
- Area code: 580
- FIPS code: 40-40700
- GNIS feature ID: 2412860

Lahoma is a town in Garfield County, Oklahoma, United States. As of the 2020 census, Lahoma had a population of 539. Its name was formed from the last three syllables of Oklahoma. Until the 1960s, Lahoma was a farm town. Later, it became primarily a bedroom community for people who commuted to work in Enid.

== Geography ==
According to the United States Census Bureau, the town has a total area of 0.3 square miles (0.78 km^{2}), all land.

Lahoma lies in western Garfield County, 11 miles west of the county seat of Enid.

== Demographics ==
Historical population
Census	Pop.	Note	%±
1910	275		—
1920	262		−4.7%
1930	197		−24.8%
1940	195		−1.0%
1950	190		−2.6%
1960	160		−15.8%
1970	299		86.9%
1980	537		79.6%
1990	645		20.1%
2000	577		−10.5%
2010	611		5.9%
2020	539		−11.8%

=== 2020 census ===
As of the 2020 census, Lahoma had a population of 539. The median age was 38.6 years. 24.5% of residents were under the age of 18 and 14.7% of residents were 65 years of age or older. For every 100 females there were 94.6 males, and for every 100 females age 18 and over there were 100.5 males age 18 and over.

0.0% of residents lived in urban areas, while 100.0% lived in rural areas.

There were 228 households in Lahoma, of which 38.2% had children under the age of 18 living in them. Of all households, 47.8% were married-couple households, 19.3% were households with a male householder and no spouse or partner present, and 23.2% were households with a female householder and no spouse or partner present. About 29.4% of all households were made up of individuals and 13.6% had someone living alone who was 65 years of age or older.

There were 257 housing units, of which 11.3% were vacant. The homeowner vacancy rate was 4.4% and the rental vacancy rate was 16.7%.

Racial composition as of the 2020 census
Race	Number	Percent
White	465	86.3%
Black or African American	1	0.2%
American Indian and Alaska Native	5	0.9%
Asian	3	0.6%
Native Hawaiian and Other Pacific Islander	2	0.4%
Some other race	14	2.6%
Two or more races	49	9.1%
Hispanic or Latino (of any race)	33	6.1%

=== 2000 census ===
As of the census of 2000, there were 577 people, 244 households, and 164 families residing in the town. The population density was 1,896.5 inhabitants per square mile (732.2/km^{2}). There were 267 housing units at an average density of 877.6 per square mile (338.8/km^{2}). The racial makeup of the town was 95.84% White, 0.69% African American, 1.21% Native American, 0.52% Asian, 0.35% from other races, and 1.39% from two or more races. Hispanic or Latino of any race were 3.47% of the population.

There were 244 households, out of which 30.3% had children under the age of 18 living with them, 49.6% were married couples living together, 15.2% had a female householder with no husband present, and 32.4% were non-families. 30.3% of all households were made up of individuals, and 10.2% had someone living alone who was 65 years of age or older. The average household size was 2.36 and the average family size was 2.94.

In the town, the population was spread out, with 24.4% under the age of 18, 10.2% from 18 to 24, 28.4% from 25 to 44, 24.3% from 45 to 64, and 12.7% who were 65 years of age or older. The median age was 37 years. For every 100 females, there were 84.9 males. For every 100 females age 18 and over, there were 84.0 males.

The median income for a household in the town was $30,227 and the median income for a family was $37,875. Males had a median income of $25,625 versus $18,462 for females. The per capita income for the town was $14,111. About 4.9% of families and 8.9% of the population were below the poverty line, including 6.5% of those under age 18 and 16.9% of those age 65 or over.

== History ==
Lahoma was founded in 1894 after the 1893 Cherokee Outlet land run. The town was originally sited about one mile from its present location, but the town's buildings, businesses, and homes were moved to the current location in 1901 to be adjacent to a newly laid railroad line.

== School ==
- Cimarron Public Schools is the area school district.

== Churches ==
Churches in the community include: First Baptist Church, Zion Lutheran Church and the United Church of Lahoma.

== Notable people ==
- Nokie Edwards, lead guitarist for The Ventures
