= Don't Run =

Don't Run may refer to:

- "Don't Run" (PartyNextDoor song), a song by PartyNextDoor
- "Don't Run (Come Back to Me)", a song by KC and the Sunshine Band
- "Don't Run" (The Flash), an episode in the fourth season of The Flash

== See also ==
- Don't Run Away (disambiguation)
- Walk, Don't Run (disambiguation)
- "Gladiators Don't Run", an episode in the fourth season of Scandal
