= George Babbitt =

George Babbitt may refer to:

- George T. Babbitt Jr. (born 1942), United States Air Force general
- George F. Babbitt, the central character of Babbitt, a 1922 novel by Sinclair Lewis
