= Semie Moseley =

American luthier (1935–1992)

- Moseley in the 1960s
- Born: June 13, 1935; Durant, Oklahoma, U.S.
- Died: August 7, 1992 (aged 57); Arkansas, U.S.
- Occupation: Luthier

Semie Moseley (June 13, 1935 – August 7, 1992) was an American luthier and the founder of guitar manufacturer Mosrite.

== Biography ==
Moseley was born in Durant, Oklahoma, in 1935. His family migrated to California along a path similar to many Bakersfield Okies, first moving to Chandler, Arizona, in 1938, and two years later to Bakersfield, California. Moseley's mother worked in a dry cleaner’s shop, his father with the Southern Pacific Railroad.

In Bakersfield, Moseley started playing guitar in an evangelical group at age 13. Moseley and his brother Andy began experimenting with guitars in their teen-age years, refinishing instruments and building new necks.

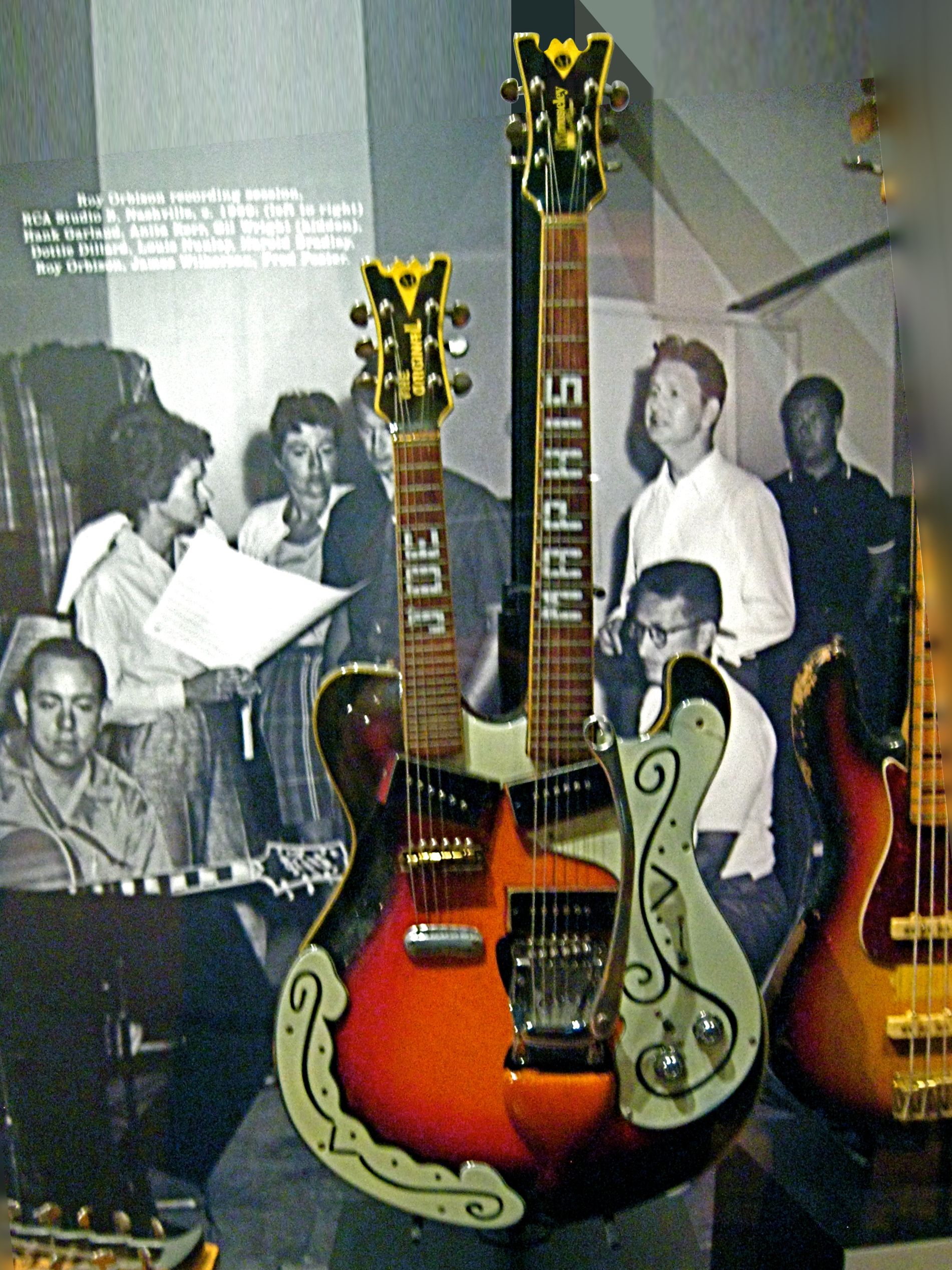
Joe Maphis's Mosrite double-necked guitar

In 1954, Moseley built a triple-neck guitar in his garage (the longest neck was a standard guitar, the second-longest neck an octave higher, the shortest was an eight-string mandolin). He presented a double-neck to Joe Maphis, a Los Angeles-area TV performer. By 1956, with an investment from Ray Boatright, a local Los Angeles minister, the brothers started their company, Mosrite of California. Moseley, who built guitars for the Los Angeles-based Rickenbacker company, said to his co-workers that he was making his own product, and he was fired by Rickenbacker.

Initial Mosrite production was all custom, handmade guitars, built in garages, tin storage sheds, wherever the Moseleys could put equipment.

In 1959, Andy Moseley moved to Nashville, Tennessee, for a year to popularize the Mosrite name and sold a few to Grand Ole Opry entertainers and both studio and road musicians. Andy Moseley said: "And that’s how we kept the factory going at the time: custom guitars".

Later the brothers also got into the recording business by establishing Mosrite Records. They signed Barbara Mandrell, a teenage daughter of a music-store owner who sold Mosrite guitars. They also signed guitarist Ronny Sessions and others.

At the peak of production in 1968 Moseley and his brother, with their crew of 107 employees, were making 1,000 instruments per month, which included acoustic guitars, standard electrics, double-necks, triple-necks, basses, dobros, and mandolins.

Mosrite of California went bankrupt in late 1968 after they contracted with a competitor to market their guitars. After this, they tried to deal directly with stores, and they sold 280 guitars in 1969 before they came to the shop one day and found their doors padlocked.

Two years after his bankruptcy, Moseley was able to get back the Mosrite name, and in 1970 started making guitars again in Pumpkin Center near Bakersfield. He moved his factory three times in the next 20 years, to Oklahoma City in the mid-70s, to the township of Jonas Ridge in Burke County, North Carolina in 1981, and to Booneville, Arkansas in 1991.

Six months after moving to Arkansas, Moseley became ill with bone cancer. He died six weeks later, in August 1992.
