= The Ventures =

American instrumental band

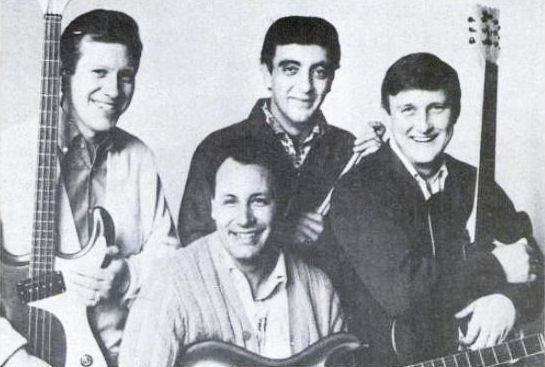
- Classic lineup of the Ventures, 1967, left to right: Bob Bogle, Nokie Edwards, Mel Taylor, Don Wilson

Background information
- Also known as: The Versatones; The New Ventures
- Origin: Tacoma, Washington, U.S.
- Genres: Instrumental rock; surf
- Years active: 1958–present
- Labels: Dolton; Liberty; United Artists; Capitol; GNP Crescendo; Blue Horizon; Hi-Tide Recordings
- Members: Bob Spalding; Leon Taylor; Ian Spalding; Luke Griffin
- Past members: Nokie Edwards; Don Wilson; Bob Bogle; Gerry McGee; Skip Moore; Howie Johnson; Mel Taylor; Sandy Lee Gornicki; John Durrill; Joe Barile; David Carr; Biff Vincent; Leisha Soukary; Jonell Calendar; George T. Babbitt Jr. Paul Warren; JD Hoag; Harvey Wicklund; Gary Woods

The Ventures are an American instrumental rock band formed in Tacoma, Washington, in 1958, by Don Wilson and Bob Bogle. The band, which was a quartet for most of its existence, helped to popularize the electric guitar across the world during the 1960s. While their popularity in the United States waned in the 1970s, the group remains especially revered in Japan, where they have toured regularly. The classic lineup of the band consisted of Wilson (rhythm guitar), Bogle (initially lead guitar, later bass), Nokie Edwards (initially bass, later lead guitar), and Mel Taylor (drums).

Their first wide-release single, "Walk, Don't Run" (1960), brought international fame to the group, and is often cited as one of the top songs ever recorded for guitar. In the 1960s and early 1970s, 38 of the band's albums charted in the U.S., ranking them as the sixth-best album chart performer during the 1960s, and the band had 14 singles in the Billboard Hot 100. With over 100 million records sold, the Ventures are the best-selling instrumental band of all time.

The band was among the first to employ and popularize fuzz and flanging guitar effects, concept albums, and twelve-string guitars in rock music. Their instrumental virtuosity, innovation, and unique sound influenced many musicians and bands, earning the group the moniker "the Band that Launched a Thousand Bands". Their recording of "Walk, Don't Run" was inducted into the Grammy Hall of Fame for its lasting impact, and in 2008, the group was inducted into the Rock and Roll Hall of Fame.

== History ==
=== Formation and rise to fame ===
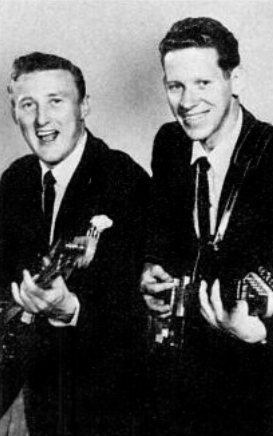
Don Wilson and Bob Bogle

Don Wilson and Bob Bogle first met in 1958, when Bogle was looking to buy a car from a used-car dealership in Seattle owned by Wilson's father. Finding a common interest in guitars, the two decided to play together, while Wilson joined Bogle performing masonry work. They bought two used guitars in a pawn shop for about $10 each. Initially calling themselves the Versatones, the duo played small clubs, beer bars, and private parties throughout the Pacific Northwest. Wilson played rhythm guitar, Bogle lead. When they went to register the band name, they found that it was already taken. Disappointed, they cast about for an appropriate name. Wilson's mother suggested the name "The Ventures", upon which they eventually agreed in 1959.

After watching Nokie Edwards play at a nightclub, they recruited him as bass player. Bogle owned a Chet Atkins LP, Hi-Fi in Focus, on which he heard the song "Walk, Don't Run". Soon, the group was in a recording studio playing the new song, with Bogle on lead, Wilson on rhythm, Edwards on bass, and Skip Moore on drums. They pressed a number of 45s, which they distributed to several record companies. Later, Skip Moore opted out of the group to work at his family's gas station. When "Walk, Don't Run" was recorded, he also opted out of the royalties from the recording, taking $25 for the session, instead. He later sued to collect royalties, but failed because of his prior opt-out. "Walk, Don't Run" sold over one million copies and was awarded a gold disc by the Recording Industry Association of America.

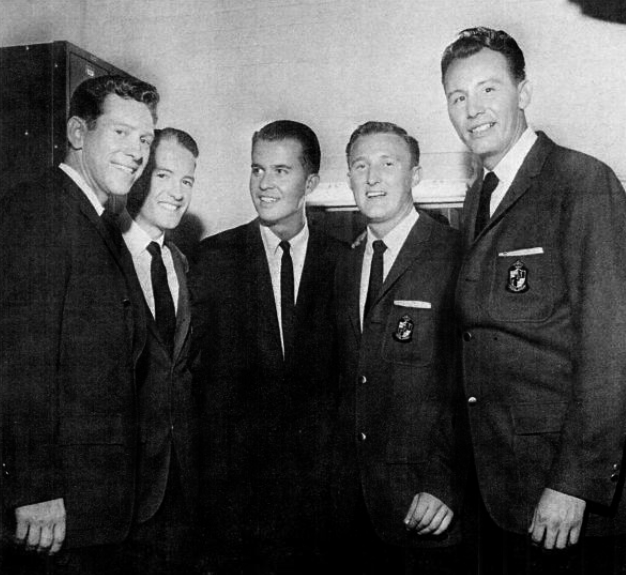
The band with Dick Clark, left to right: Bob Bogle, Howie Johnson, Dick Clark, Don Wilson, and Nokie Edwards.

Needing a permanent drummer for the group after George T. Babbitt Jr. dropped out because he was not old enough to play night clubs and bars, they hired Howie Johnson,, and in the midst of a fast-paced touring schedule, recorded an album to capitalize on the success of the single. Babbitt went on to become a four-star general in the United States Air Force, and on March 1, 1998, he played live in uniform on drums with the band. The lineup of Bogle, Wilson, Edwards, and Johnson remained intact until September 1962, when Johnson was replaced by Mel Taylor. The group found early success with a string of singles, but quickly became leaders in the album market.

The Ventures were among the pioneers of concept albums (starting with 1961's The Colorful Ventures), where each song on several of their albums was chosen to fit a specific theme. Some of the Ventures' most popular albums at the time were a series of records of dance music. In the early 1960s "golden age of hi-fi", with the novelty of stereo still in its experimental stages, the Ventures found their characteristic style of recording each instrument in either the extreme left or right channel, with little (if any) crossover, enhancing the stereo effect to its fullest limits.

In 1963, Edwards, a talented guitarist in his own right, suggested that Bogle's lead-guitar abilities were being stretched, and that they were in essence wasting Edwards' talents by keeping him on bass. Bogle agreed and rapidly learned the bass parts to all their tunes, allowing Edwards to take lead guitar full-time, although he had played lead previously on several tracks on their first studio sessions/albums. This move proved to be vital in modernizing the band's sound, ensuring success in an ever-changing market well into the late 1960s.

=== Classic lineup ===
In the fall of 1957, Johnson had been injured in an auto crash, which caused irreversible spinal damage. This forced him to play with a neckbrace at first. He was able to play without it, though, shortly after joining the group. Johnson played on the first four LPs and recorded on about half of the tracks on the fifth LP (Twist with the Ventures/aka Dance!) and about half of their sixth LP (Twist With The Ventures Vol. 2/aka Dance with the Ventures). He did not like spending so much time away from his new family (his second marriage) by having to commute from Seattle to Los Angeles to record, and because of this, he left the band. Johnson continued to play locally in the Washington area with local groups until his death on May 5, 1988, at age 54.

At the time Johnson quit the Ventures, Bogle and Wilson already knew Mel Taylor, house drummer at The Palomino in North Hollywood (the venue where they would play numerous shows during their resurgence in the 1980s). Taylor was known for a hard-hitting style of drumming. The group invited him to some recording sessions, which led Taylor to become a permanent member of the Ventures. The band continued to remain a constant presence in the American music landscape during this time; between 1962 and 1967, they released 22 albums, and all but one reached the top 100 of the Billboard albums chart (13 of which reached the top 40). They experienced more moderate success in the singles market, with six singles charting on the Billboard Hot 100. Their most successful single during this time was "Walk Don't Run '64" (a rearranged surf-style version of their 1960 breakout hit), which reached number eight.

During this time, the Ventures' popularity overseas began to increase significantly. In particular, the Japanese music market embraced the Ventures' music after Bogle and Wilson toured the country in 1962. By the time they returned in 1964, this time as a full band, their music became immensely popular in Japan, and they were greeted by thousands of fans at the airport. Their 1965 single "Diamond Head" reached only number 70 in the United States, but was a major hit overseas, reaching number one in the Japanese and Hong Kong markets, and becoming the first million-selling single in Japan. The Ventures were responsible for a period in Japanese music known as the "eleki boom", where thousands of Japanese purchased electric guitars and many guitar-based bands started up.

=== Decline and resurgence in the US ===
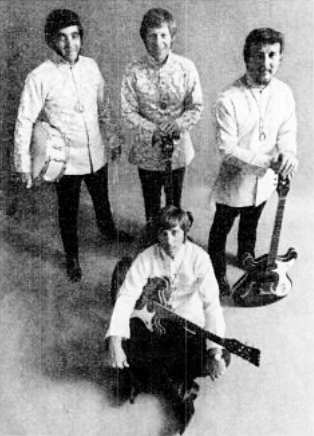
The 1968—1972 version of the Ventures, standing from left to right: Mel Taylor, Bob Bogle, and Don Wilson. Gerry McGee is sitting.

The combination of Edwards on lead guitar, Taylor on drums, Bogle on bass, and Wilson on rhythm guitar remained unchanged until Edwards left the band in 1968, to be replaced by Gerry McGee (born Gerald James McGee in Eunice, Louisiana; November 17, 1937 – October 12, 2019), son of the famous Cajun fiddle player Dennis McGee.

Edwards came back in 1973 and remained with them until 1984, although he has toured and gigged with them dozens of times in the subsequent years. Edwards' replacement in 1984 was, once again, Gerry McGee. Mel Taylor left in 1972, being replaced by drummer Joe Barile, to pursue a solo career when the Ventures became a nostalgia act. His intentions were to concentrate on new material and the progressive side of music. He returned in 1979 and stayed with the Ventures until his death from cancer in 1996.

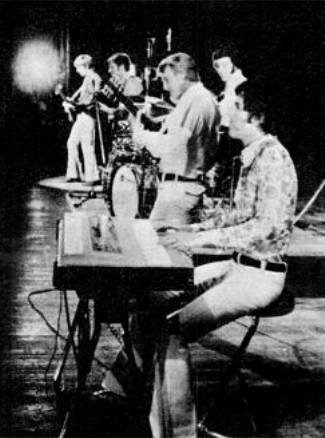
The band in 1970, left to right: Gerry McGee, Bob Bogle, Don Wilson, Mel Taylor, and John Durrill

Their commercial fortunes in the U.S. declined sharply in the early 1970s due to changing musical trends. In the late 1970s and into the 1980s, a resurgence of interest in surf music led to some in the punk/new wave audience rediscovering the band. The Go-Go's wrote "Surfin' and Spyin'" and dedicated it to the Ventures. The Ventures recorded their own version and continued occasionally to perform the song. Their career again rejuvenated by Quentin Tarantino's use of the Lively Ones' version of Nokie Edwards' "Surf Rider" and several other classic surf songs in the soundtrack of the hit movie Pulp Fiction. The Ventures became one of the most popular groups worldwide due in large part to their instrumental approach; they had no language barriers to overcome.

=== Recent years ===
When Mel Taylor got sick, he was replaced by his son, Leon Taylor. The Ventures continue to tour in the U.S. and Japan, and since Don Wilson retired in 2015, the current lineups of the Ventures feature no original members. The band is led by Bob Spalding, who joined as a session extra and guitar/bass substitiute member in 1980; he joined full time when Bogle retired in 2004. Mel Taylor's son Leon is still active in the group and Bob Spalding's son, Ian, has been in the group since 2016.

=== Deaths ===
Howie Johnson died in 1988.

Mel Taylor died on August 11, 1996, of cancer, at the age of 62. He was diagnosed two weeks before his death.

Bogle retired from the band in December 2004 and was replaced by Bob Spalding. Bogle lived in Vancouver, Washington, for years and died there on June 14, 2009, of non-Hodgkin lymphoma; he was 75.

Nokie Edwards left the band in 1985, but from 1999 until 2016, he made occasional guest appearances with the band on stage. He died on March 12, 2018, from complications after hip surgery. He was 82.

Gerry McGee, who was in the band for nearly 35 years after returning to the group in 1985, died on October 12, 2019, after having a heart attack and collapsing onstage four days earlier in Japan. He was 81.

Don Wilson continued to record with the band, but retired from touring at the end of 2015. He died of natural causes on January 22, 2022, at the age of 88.

== Guitars ==
During their first years (1958–1961), the Ventures played Fender guitars (a Jazzmaster, a Stratocaster, and a Precision Bass) for both their live performances and their recording sessions. These instruments are prominently visible on the covers of two early albums: The Ventures and The Colorful Ventures. From 1962 to 1963, they used two Jazzmasters with a Precision Bass, shown on the album cover of Bobby Vee meets The Ventures. Then in early 1963, California guitar manufacturer Mosrite rebranded its uniquely styled, futuristic-looking Mark 1 electric guitar model for the Ventures by applying decals that stated "The Ventures Model" on the headstock. The band adopted these guitars (which included a bass model) and first used them on The Ventures in Space (1963), one of their most influential albums because of the unique, otherworldly guitar sounds it contained. From 1963 through 1968, a statement on their album covers announced that the Ventures used Mosrite guitars "exclusively" (the Ventures and designer Semie Moseley were partners in the distribution of these instruments). After the expiration of their contract with Moseley, the Ventures returned to playing mainly Fender guitars. Only rarely have they used Mosrite guitars since that contract ended.

In the mid-1990s, Fender issued a limited-edition Ventures Signature Series of guitars consisting of a Jazzmaster, a Stratocaster, and a Fender Jazz Bass, all with specifications determined by the band.

Aria Guitars and Wilson Brothers Guitars have subsequently issued Ventures Signature Model instruments. The Wilson Brothers guitar, in particular, is closely modeled physically on the original Mosrite design.

== Legacy ==
The Ventures enjoyed their greatest popularity and success in the U.S. and Japan in the 1960s, but they continue to perform and record. With over 110 million albums sold worldwide, the group remains the best-selling instrumental rock group of all time. Thirty-eight Ventures albums (including a seasonal Christmas album) charted in the U.S., and six of 14 chart singles made it into the top 40, with three making it into the top 10. Of their 38 chart albums, 34 of them occurred in the 1960s, and the Ventures rank as the sixth-best pop album performer for that decade, according to "Joel Whitburn's Top Pop Albums".

Among their achievements in America, in 1963 the Ventures had five LPs in the Billboard Top 100 of the albums chart at the same time. Additionally, they released a series of instructional LPs entitled Play Guitar with the Ventures and Play Electric Bass with the Ventures. Four LPs were released in this series, the first of which reached the Billboard Top 100 Album Chart, an achievement previously unheard of for an instructional LP. In a novelty achievement, the Ventures were the first act to place two different versions of the same song in the top 10, those being "Walk, Don't Run" (number two) and "Walk, Don't Run '64" (number eight).

The Ventures were among the first rock acts able to sell albums based on a style and sound without needing hit singles on the albums. These albums are also some of the earliest examples of the concept album in rock music. Many of the Ventures' albums, starting with Colorful Ventures in 1961, were organized according to a central theme.

While they antedated the advent of the terms surf guitar and surf rock, and they do not consider themselves a surf rock group, they were a major building block of surf music, if not the first to play the style. Guitar Player, in an article titled "20 Essential Rock Albums", cited elements of their 1960 Walk, Don't Run album which presaged the coming surf trend.

The theme music of the television show Hawaii Five-O continues to be popular. The tune was composed by Morton Stevens, who also composed numerous episode scores. The theme was recorded by the Ventures, whose version reached number four on the Billboard Hot 100 pop chart. Because of the tempo of the music, the theme gained popularity in the UK with followers of northern soul and was popular on dance floors in the 1970s.

The Encyclopædia Britannica states that the Ventures "served as a prototype for guitar-based rock groups."

In the mid-1960s, the group's label Dolton Records released several instructional albums of the Ventures' music for electric guitar and bass. According to the book The 100 Greatest Bands of All Time (2015): "These appear to have appeared to be among the first rock instructional albums ever released and are reputed to have been the best-selling such albums ever. In fact, one of these albums apparently was the only such instructional album ever to make the charts." Music Connection's Harvey Kubernik describes the five Play Guitar with the Ventures albums as "influential", similarly commenting that they "became the only instructional albums ever to appear on the U.S. national Billboard charts."

On March 10, 2008, the Ventures were inducted into the Rock and Roll Hall of Fame with John Fogerty as their presenter. In attendance were original members Don Wilson and Nokie Edwards, late-1960s member John Durrill, current guitarist Bob Spalding, and current drummer Leon Taylor, son of Mel Taylor, who along with Mel Taylor's widow, Fiona, accepted on behalf of the Ventures' late drummer. Bob Bogle and Gerry McGee were unable to attend the ceremony. Fiona Taylor gave special mention to her husband's predecessor drummers Skip Moore and Howie Johnson. The Ventures performed their biggest hits, "Walk, Don't Run" and "Hawaii Five-O", augmented on the latter by Rock and Roll Hall of Fame musical director Paul Shaffer and his band.

=== Fame in Japan ===
The band in Japan in 1965, from left to right: Wilson, Taylor, Edwards, Bogle

The Ventures are still the most popular American rock group in Japan, the world's second-largest record market. One oft-quoted statistic is that the Ventures outsold the Beatles 2-to-1 in Japan. They produced dozens of albums exclusively for the Japanese and European markets and have regularly toured Japan from the 1960s through to the present. According to a January 1966 Billboard article, the Ventures had five of 1965's top-10 singles in Japan.

=== Special effects ===
The Ventures pioneered the use of special effects on such songs as "The 2000 Pound Bee", recorded in late 1962, in which lead guitarist Nokie Edwards employed a fuzz pedal. Edwards' use of "fuzz tone" antedated the "King of Fuzz Guitar", Davie Allan of the Arrows, by at least three years. In addition, Edwards was among the first to use the twelve-string guitar in rock. The 1964 The Ventures in Space album was a primer in the use of special guitar effects and made pioneering use of reverse-tracking. The Ventures in Space, because of its ethereal, space-like effects, was deemed an influence on the later 1960s San Francisco psychedelic generation, as well as being cited as a favorite by Keith Moon of the Who.

The band's cover of the Tornados' "Telstar" (released in January 1963) featured one of the first instances of flanging on a pop record. The song "Silver Bells" on The Ventures' Christmas Album, released in November 1965, has one of the first recorded uses of a talk box as a musical effect, voiced by Red Rhodes.

=== Influences ===
The Ventures have had an influence on many musicians, both professional and amateur. Their instructional album, Play Guitar with the Ventures, was the first such record to chart on the Billboard Top LPs list, peaking at number 96, and taught thousands of budding guitarists how to play the guitar. George Harrison stated in a Guitar Player interview that he preferred the American guitar sound of the Ventures to British contemporaries. When asked to name the most influential rock guitar solos, Joe Walsh said he would have to include the entire song "Walk, Don't Run" because it changed so many guitar players' lives. John Fogerty, during his introduction of the Ventures at their Hall of Fame induction, said that it "kicked open a whole movement in rock and roll... The sound of it became 'surf music' and the audacity of it empowered guitarists everywhere." Stephen Stills told Ventures guitarist Don Wilson that he learned to play on Ventures records. Jeff Baxter and Gene Simmons were early members of the Ventures Fan Club. Carl Wilson called the Ventures a major influence on his early guitar playing, stating that the Beach Boys had learned to play all of their songs by ear.

== Band members ==
=== Current members ===
- Bob Spalding – lead guitar, bass guitar, rhythm guitar (2004–present; studio and live guest 1980–2004)
- Leon Taylor – drums (1996–present)
- Ian Spalding – rhythm guitar, bass guitar (2016–present)
- Luke Griffin – bass guitar, rhythm guitar (2017–present)

=== Former members ===
- Don Wilson – rhythm guitar (1958–2015; died 2022)
- Bob Bogle – bass guitar, lead guitar (1958–2004; died 2009)
- George T. Babbitt – drums (1959–1960)
- Nokie Edwards – lead guitar, bass guitar (1960–1968, 1972–1985; as guest 1999–2016; died 2018)
- Howie Johnson – drums (1960–1962; died 1988)
- Skip Moore – drums (1960)
- Mel Taylor – drums (1962–1973, 1979–1996; died 1996)
- Gerry McGee – guitar (1968–1972, 1985–2017; died 2019)
- John Durrill – keyboards (1968–1972)
- Sandy Lee Gornicki – keyboards (1968)
- Joe Barile – drums (1973–1979)
- David Carr – keyboards (1972–1975)
- Biff Vincent – keyboards (1975–1976)
- JD Hoag – guitar (1981–1982)

== Discography ==
Selected studio albums

- Walk, Don't Run (1960)
- The Ventures (1961)
- Another Smash!!! (1961)
- The Colorful Ventures (1961)
- Twist with the Ventures (1962) (aka Dance)
- Twist with the Ventures Vol 2 (1962) (aka Dance with the Ventures)
- Mashed Potatoes And Gravy (1962) (aka Beach Party)
- The Ventures play the Country Classics (1963) (aka I Walk The Line)
- Let's go! (1963)
- Surfing (1963)
- Bobby Vee Meets the Ventures (1963)
- The Ventures Play Telstar and the Lonely Bull (1963)
- The Ventures in Space (1964)
- Walk, Don't Run, Vol. 2 (1964)
- Knock Me Out! (1965)
- Where The Action Is (1966)
- Wild Things! (1966)
- Super Psychedelics (1967)
- Guitar Freakout (1967)
- Flights Of Fantasy (1968)
- Hawaii Five-O (1969)
- Underground Fire (1969)
- 10th Anniversary Album (1970)
- New Testament (1971)
- Pops In Japan '71 (1971)
- Best of Pops Sound (1971)
- Theme from "Shaft" (1972)
- Joy: The Ventures Play the Classics (1972)
- Rock and Roll Forever (1972)
- Only Hits! (1973)
- Pops In Japan '73 (1973)
- The Jim Croce Songbook (1974)
- The Ventures Play the Carpenters (1974)
- Now Playing (1975)
- Hollywood: Yuya Uchida Meets the Ventures (1975)
- Rocky Road: The New Ventures (1976)
- T.V. Themes (1977)
- Latin Album (1979)
- Chameleon (1980)
- 60's Pops (1981)
- The Last Album on Liberty (1982)
- Nasa 25th Anniversary Commemorative Album (1983)
- The Ventures Play The Major Motion Picture (1991)
- The Ventures Play The Seaside Story (1991)
- The Ventures Favorites (1996)
- Wild Again (1997)
- New Depths (1998)
- Walk Don't Run 2000 (1999)
- Gold (2000)
- The Ventures Play The Southern All Stars (2001)
- Christmas Joy (2002)
- Rocky! (2007)
- In My Life (2010)
- New Space (2023)

== See also ==
- List of best-selling music artists
- List of Rock and Roll Hall of Fame inductees
- List of surf rock musicians
- Rautalanka
- The Ventures discography

== Bibliography ==
- Walk, Don't Run - The Story of The Ventures, 2nd ed. 2009, by Del Halterman (US), p. 378, Lulu Press.
- Driving Guitars, by M.Campbell & D.Burke (UK), 2009, p. 430, Idmon press.
