= George T. Babbitt Jr. =

United States Air Force general

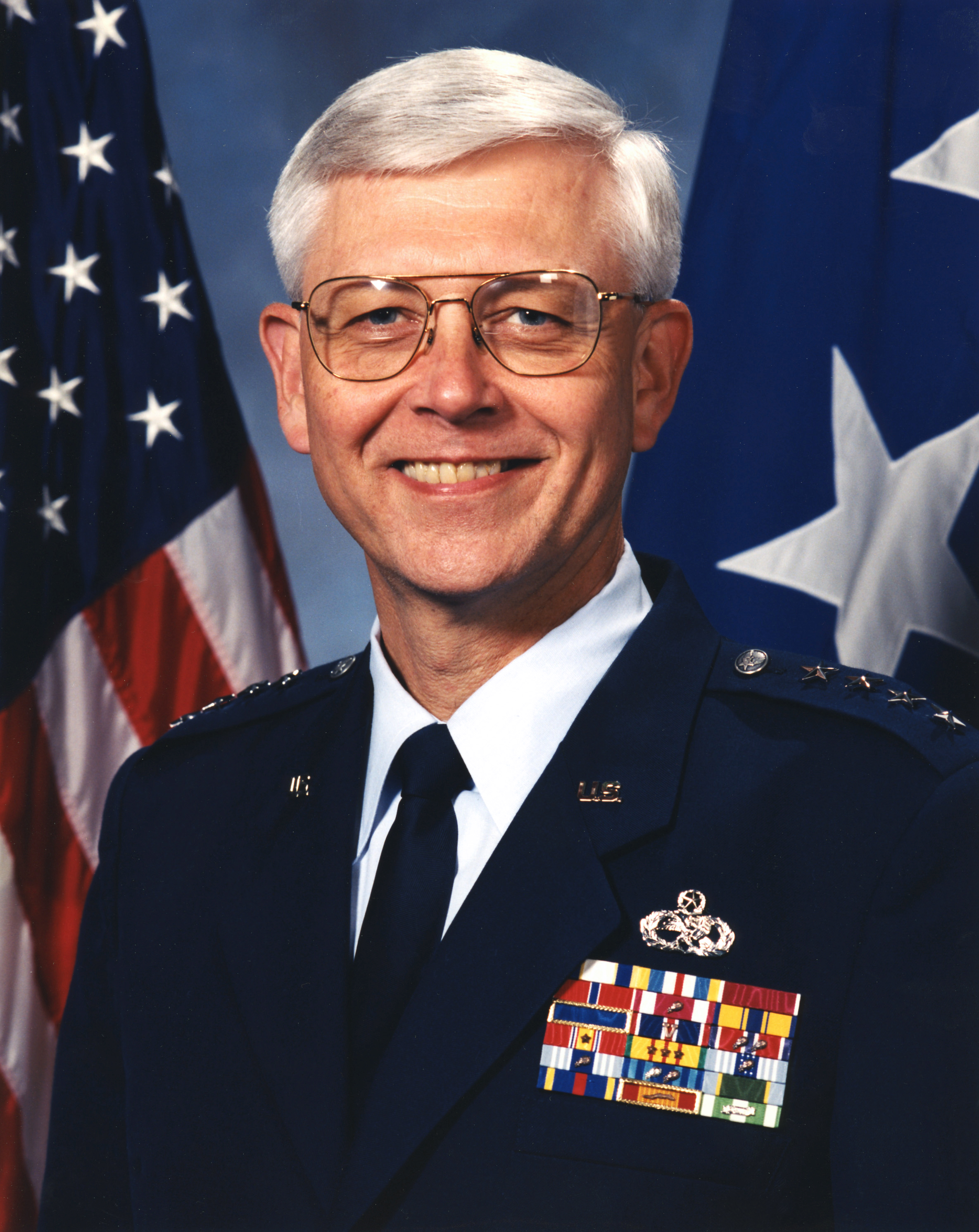
- General George T. Babbitt Jr.
- Born: June 22, 1942 (age 84); Bremerton, Washington, U.S.
- Military career
- Allegiance: United States of America
- Branch: United States Air Force
- Service years: 1965–2000
- Rank: General
- Commands: Air Force Materiel Command; Defense Logistics Agency
- Conflicts: Vietnam War
- Awards: Air Force Distinguished Service Medal; Legion of Merit; Bronze Star

General George T. Babbitt (born June 22, 1942) is a retired United States Air Force four-star general who served as Commander, Air Force Materiel Command (COMAFMC), from 1997 to 2000.

== The Ventures ==
As a teenager in 1959, Babbitt joined the surf rock group the Ventures, just before the band gained fame with their huge hit "Walk Don't Run" in 1960. Babbitt had to drop out because he was not old enough to play the nightclubs and bars the band was beginning to work in.

On March 1, 1998, while on active duty as 4-star general, he played live in uniform on drums with the Ventures.

== Air Force ==
Babbitt was commissioned in 1965 through the Reserve Officer Training Corps program at the University of Washington. He trained as an aircraft maintenance officer and served as officer in charge of fighter flight lines in the United States, the Pacific and Europe. He twice commanded aircraft maintenance squadrons and was deputy commander for maintenance of a European F-15 wing.

Prior to assuming command of Air Force Materiel Command, Babbitt was director of the Defense Logistics Agency at Fort Belvoir, Virginia. Other assignments include deputy chief of staff for logistics, Headquarters U.S. Air Force; deputy director for materiel management, Defense Logistics Agency; director of supply, Headquarters U.S. Air Force, and director of logistics for both Headquarters Air Training Command and Headquarters U.S. Air Forces in Europe.

== Education ==
- 1965 Bachelor of Science degree in mechanical engineering, University of Washington, Seattle
- 1970 Master of Science degree in logistics management, Air Force Institute of Technology, Wright-Patterson Air Force Base, Ohio
- 1975 Program Managers Course, Defense Systems Management College, Fort Belvoir, Virginia
- 1978 Armed Forces Staff College, Norfolk, Virginia
- 1986 Air War College, Maxwell Air Force Base, Alabama
- 1989 The Executive Development Program, Kellogg School of Business, Northwestern University, Illinois
- 1993 Program for Senior Managers in Government, John F. Kennedy School of Government, Harvard University, Massachusetts

== Assignments ==
- June 1965 – February 1966, student, aircraft maintenance officer course, Chanute Air Force Base, Illinois
- February 1966 – June 1969, RF-4C maintenance officer, RAF Alconbury, England
- June 1969 – September 1970, student, Air Force Institute of Technology, Wright-Patterson Air Force Base, Ohio
- September 1970 – September 1971, squadron maintenance officer, 12th Tactical Reconnaissance Squadron, Tan Son Nhut Air Base, South Vietnam
- September 1971 – August 1973, maintenance planner, B-1A System Program Office, Rockwell International, Los Angeles
- August 1973 – January 1976, support equipment and spares manager, B-1A System Program Office, Wright-Patterson Air Force Base, Ohio
- January 1976 – January 1978, deputy program manager for logistics, Precision Location Strike System Program Office, Wright-Patterson Air Force Base, Ohio
- January 1978 – July 1978, student, Armed Forces Staff College, Norfolk, Virginia
- July 1978 – August 1980, maintenance officer and later, commander, 1st Aircraft Generation Squadron, Langley Air Force Base, Virginia
- August 1980 – September 1981, commander, 36th Aircraft Generation Squadron, Bitburg Air Base, West Germany
- September 1981 – July 1985, assistant deputy commander for maintenance and later, deputy commander for maintenance, 36th Tactical Fighter Wing, Bitburg Air Base, West Germany
- July 1985 – June 1986, student, Air War College, Maxwell Air Force Base, Alabama
- June 1986 – June 1990, division chief and later, deputy director of logistics plans and programs, Headquarters U.S. Air Force, Washington, D.C.
- June 1990 – July 1992, director, logistics, Headquarters Air Training Command, Randolph Air Force Base, Texas
- July 1992 – June 1993, director, logistics, Headquarters U.S. Air Forces in Europe, Ramstein Air Base, Germany
- June 1993 – March 1994, director of supply, Headquarters U.S. Air Force, Washington, D.C.
- April 1994 – June 1995, deputy director of materiel management, Defense Logistics Agency, Alexandria, Virginia
- June 1995 – October 1996, deputy chief of staff for logistics, Headquarters U.S. Air Force, Washington, D.C.
- October 1996 – May 1997, director, Defense Logistics Agency, Fort Belvoir, Virginia
- May 1997 – 2000, commander, Air Force Materiel Command, Wright-Patterson Air Force Base, Ohio

== Major awards and decorations ==
- Air Force Distinguished Service Medal
- Defense Superior Service Medal
- Legion of Merit
- Bronze Star
- Meritorious Service Medal
- Air Force Commendation Medal
- Vietnam Service Medal with three service stars
- Republic of Vietnam Gallantry Cross Unit Citation

== Effective dates of promotion ==
- Second lieutenant March 19, 1965
- First lieutenant November 30, 1966
- Captain June 12, 1968
- Major February 1, 1975
- Lieutenant colonel November 1, 1979
- Colonel August 1, 1984
- Brigadier general September 1, 1990
- Major general July 1, 1993
- Lieutenant general July 1, 1995
- General June 1, 1997
