= Art Greenhaw =

American musician and record producer

- Born: July 14, 1954 (age 71); Dallas, Texas, U.S.
- Genres: Western swing, Southern gospel, country
- Occupations: Musician, record producer, audio engineer
- Instrument: Bass guitar
- Years active: 1980s–present
- Labels: Greenhaw Records
- Website: artgreenhaw.com

Art Greenhaw (born July 14, 1954) is an American musician, record producer and audio engineer. He founded the independent record label Greenhaw Records. In 1993, he joined the Light Crust Doughboys as the band's bassist and manager. He has worked as musician, producer, arranger and songwriter with Nokie Edwards, Tom Brumley, James Blackwood, Ann-Margret, Engelbert Humperdinck, Trini Lopez, and Ronnie Dawson. In 2003 he was awarded the Grammy Award for Best Southern, Country or Bluegrass Gospel Album.

== Life and career ==
Greenhaw was born in Dallas, Texas in 1954. He learned to play the guitar at age eight, and by fourth grade had his own band, "The Doodlebugs". He played in a rock band named "The Inner Soul", where he met physician George Miller, father of rock musician Steve Miller. The elder Miller hired Greenhaw's band to play at parties, and Greenhaw's interest in guitar led him to country music. He also studied classical music as a child, and he was part of the first group of students admitted by audition to Southern Methodist University's (SMU) newly created Piano Preparatory Department. He was eventually taught by Lucien Leinfelder. Greenhaw received his bachelor's degree in political science from SMU in 1976.

From 1983, Greenhaw was musical director and band leader of a weekly country music revue, the Mesquite Opry. He first worked with the Light Crust Doughboys when he booked them to play at the Mesquite Folk Festival in 1983, which he had founded. Walter Hailey, the Doughboys' master of ceremonies in the 1950s, was born in Mesquite and was a friend of Greenhaw's family.

The band had been working only sporadically for several years. Greenhaw became their bassist, co-producer, and manager in 1993. He arranged for the band to play in theaters throughout Texas and Oklahoma, and brought his experience as a rock bassist to their musical style. He organized performance and recording opportunities for the Doughboys. In 1997, he took the lead in composing and arranging music and recording the soundtrack for the documentary film Lugosi: Hollywood's Dracula, about actor Bela Lugosi. He worked on the project with University of Oklahoma instructor Gary Rhodes. The project received a positive review in Filmfax magazine.

Also in 1997, the Doughboys joined the Southern Methodist University Mustang Band and worked on a recording entitled The High Road on the Hilltop. This collaboration came through Greenhaw's previous connections with SMU. His father, Frank, earned a degree from SMU and from 1941 to 1945 was student director of the SMU Mustang Band. Greenhaw wrote three of the songs that were recorded, "High Road", "Texas Women" and "Hangin' 'Round Deep Ellum".

The 2005 album 20th Century Gospel: From Hymns to Blackwood Brothers Tribute to Christian Country, included contributions from Greenhaw and the Light Crust Doughboys, as well as The Jordanaires and Nokie Edwards. AllMusic said the album was "A pristinely recorded and expertly played slice of truly American music . . . an uplifting work that resonates with the participants' obvious love of making music."

In 2006, for the Diamond Anniversary of the Light Crust Doughboys, America Sejung Corporation (ASC) were commissioned to produce a limited edition series of seven fretted musical instruments. With Greenhaw as technical advisor, they included a banjo, mandolin (with pickup), electric bass, and hollow and solid-body electric guitars. The instruments were produced in a customised "Biscuit Brown" colour.

Greenhaw was inducted into the Texas Gospel Music Hall of Fame in 2015 at Dallas Baptist University, in Dallas, Texas. In 2015, his book, Mesquite (Images of America), was released by Arcadia Publishing.

In 2016, Greenhaw began creating, editing and writing faith-based visual novels and comic books, starting with a book series titled God's Silver Soldiers (also known as Silver Soldiers: The Comic), and followed by Tales of Nazareth: The Boyhood of Jesus. The comic books, under the imprint of Truthmonger Comics Group Publishing, were praised for their innovative illustrations as well as their storylines and received media coverage.

== Discography ==
Year	Title	Artist	Label
1997	Lugosi Hollywood's Dracula	Art Greenhaw	Greenhaw Records
2006	The Best of Nokie Edwards' Roots Music	Nokie Edwards / Art Greenhaw	Greenhaw Records
2009	The R&B Americana Album: Soul Cats Meet Hillbilly Cats	Tom Brumley / Larry "T-Byrd" Gordon / Art Greenhaw	Greenhaw Records
2009	Deep Ellum Blues	Nokie Edwards / Art Greenhaw	Greenhaw Records
2014	Live at La Mé Studio: The Texas R&B Show Band Sessions	Nokie Edwards / Larry "T-Byrd" Gordon / Art Greenhaw	Greenhaw Records
2015	Twanging Guitars and Soulful Voices	Nokie Edwards / Art Greenhaw / Robert Shumy	Greenhaw Records
2016	God's Silver Soldiers	Art Greenhaw / Light Crust Doughboys	Greenhaw Records
2017	Music to Read Truthmonger Comics By	Art Greenhaw	Greenhaw Records
2017	Men in Blue/Crossfire Police Tribute Album	Art Greenhaw	Greenhaw Records

== Grammy Award listing ==
Year	Album title	Artists	Greenhaw credit(s)	Grammy Award
1998	Keep Lookin' Up : The Texas Swing Sessions	James Blackwood & The Light Crust Doughboys	Performer, producer and engineer	Nominated
1999	They Gave The World A Smile : The Stamps Quartet Tribute Album	James Blackwood Quartet & The Light Crust Doughboys	Performer, composer, liner notes, spoken word	Nominated
2001	The Great Gospel Hit Parade : From Memphis To Nashville To Texas	James Blackwood, The Jordanaires, & The Light Crust Doughboys	Performer, producer and engineer	Nominated
2002	God is Love : The Gospel Sessions	Ann-Margret, The Jordanaires, The Light Crust Doughboys and James Blackwood	Performer, producer and engineer	Nominated
2003	We Called Him Mr. Gospel Music : The James Blackwood Tribute Album	The Jordanaires, Larry Ford and The Light Crust Doughboys	Performer, producer and engineer	Won
2004	Always Hear The Harmony : The Gospel Sessions	Engelbert Humperdinck	Performer, producer and engineer	Nominated
2005	20th Century Gospel : From Hymns to Blackwood Brothers Tribute to Christian Country	The Jordanaires, Art Greenhaw & The Light Crust Doughboys, Nokie Edwards	Performer, producer and engineer	Nominated
2006	Southern Meets Soul : An American Gospel Jubilee	The Jordanaires, The Light Crust Doughboys, Nokie Edwards, & Larry "T-Byrd" Gordon	Performer, producer and engineer	Nominated

== Other awards ==
- 1980: Recipient of commendation, President Jimmy Carter
- 1995: Named Official State of Texas Music Ambassador, Texas House of Representatives
- 1995: Recipient of Family Business of Year Award, Baylor University, Waco, Texas
- 1995: Commendation from Texas Commission on the Arts, Austin
- 1999: Dove Award nominee
- 2002: Dove Award nominee

== Publications ==
- The Ultimate All-Day Singing Songook Book, Marvin Montgomery & Art Greenhaw, 1999, Mel Bay Publications, Incorporated, CD / Hardback book, ISBN 978-0786650156
- The Light Crust Doughboys Songbook, Marvin "Smokey" Montgomery & Art Greenhaw, 2001, Mel Bay Publications, Incorporated, CD / Hardback book, ISBN 9780786630707

== Bibliography ==
- Boyd, Jean A. (2003). "We're the Light Crust Doughboys from Burrus Mill": An Oral History (1st ed.). University of Texas Press. ISBN 978-0-292-70925-6. pp. 108, 111, 113, 114, 115, 119, 121.
- Dempsey, John Mark (2002). The Light Crust Doughboys are on the Air : Celebrating Seventy Years of Texas Music. University of North Texas Press. ISBN 978-1-57441-151-5.
