= Mosrite =

American guitar manufacturing company

Coordinates: 33.6460322°N 111.899058°W

- Formerly: Mosrite of California
- Type: Private
- Industry: Musical instruments
- Founded: Los Angeles, California (1956)
- Founder: Semie Moseley and Andy Moseley
- Headquarters: List: Los Angeles, California (1956–59); Oildale, California (1959–68); Pumpkin Center, Kern County, California (1971); Oklahoma City, Oklahoma (mid-1970s); Jonas Ridge, North Carolina (1981–93); Leachville, Arkansas (1991–1993), United States
- Area served: Worldwide
- Key people: Semie Moseley and Andy Moseley
- Products: Electric guitars

Mosrite was an American guitar manufacturing company, established in Bakersfield, California in 1956 and active until 1993. Founded by Semie Moseley, Mosrite guitars were played by many artists, most notably country stars Joe Maphis and Buck Owens, surf rocker Nokie Edwards of the Ventures, and punk rocker Johnny Ramone of the Ramones.

Mosrite guitars were known for innovative design and high-quality engineering. Their instruments had very thin and narrow necks relative to other guitars of the era, along with low frets and "hot" pickups with high output. Moseley's design for the Ventures, known as "the Ventures model" (later known as the "Mark I") was generally considered the flagship of the line. Mosrite also made a small number of acoustic guitars, including a 12-string.

== History ==
=== Apprenticeship ===
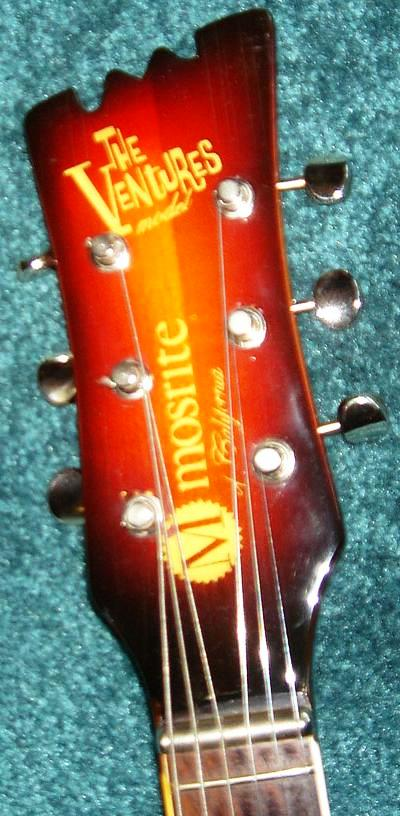
Ventures model headstock

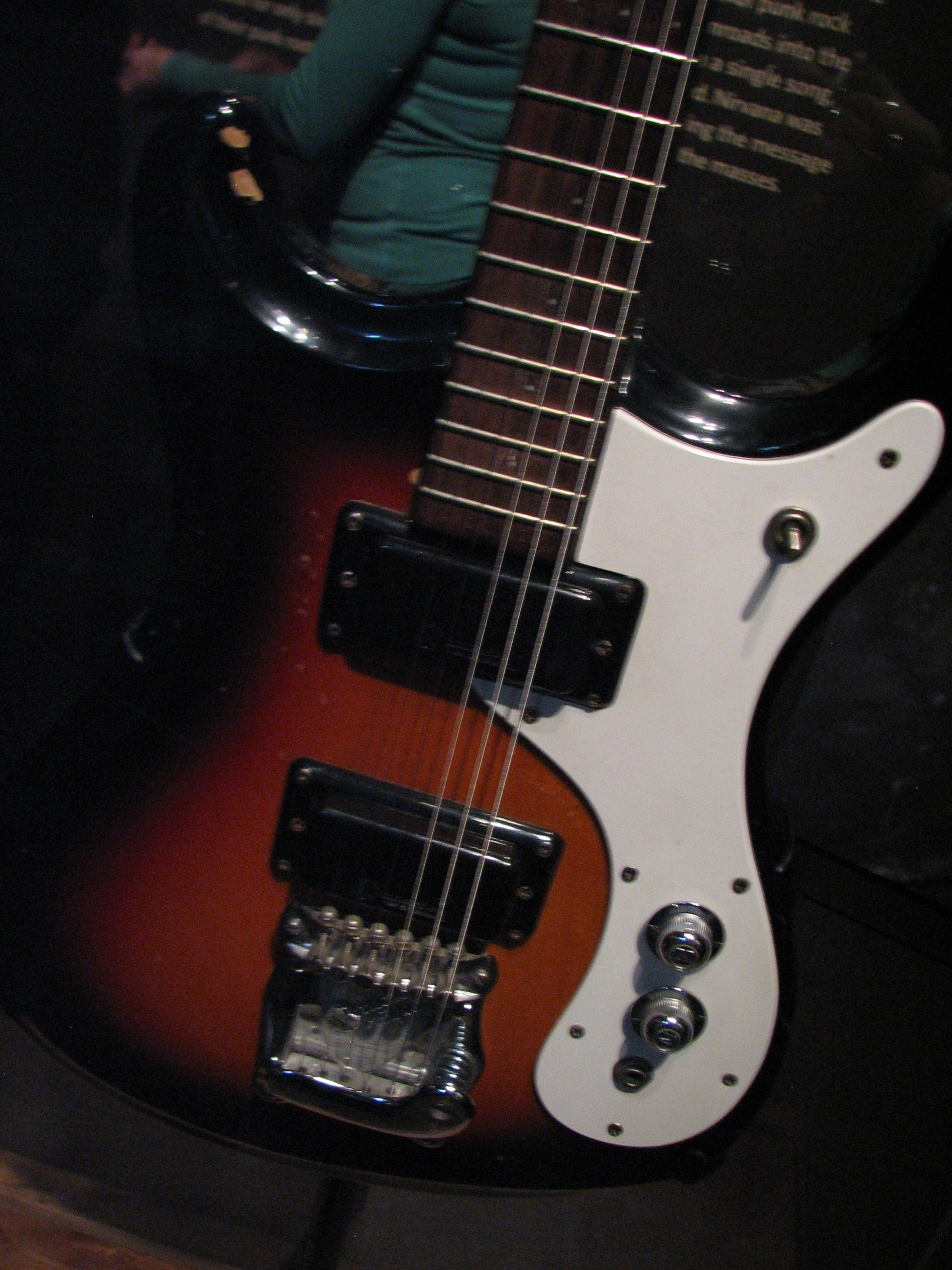
Mark V Guitar

Semie Moseley started playing guitar in an evangelical music group in Bakersfield, California, at age 13. He and his brother Andy experimented with guitars from their teenage years, refinishing instruments and building new necks.

Moseley began building guitars in the Los Angeles area around 1952 or 1953, apprenticing at the Rickenbacker factory. There he learned much of his guitar making skills from Roger Rossmeisl, a German immigrant who brought old-world luthier techniques into the modern electric guitar manufacturing process. One of the most recognizable features on most Mosrite guitars is the "German Carve" on the top that Moseley learned from Rossmeisl. During the same time, Moseley apprenticed with Paul Bigsby in Downey, California, the man who made the first modern solid-body guitar for Merle Travis in 1948, and who invented the Bigsby vibrato tailpiece, which is still used today.

=== Mosrite founded ===
In 1954, Moseley built a triple-neck guitar in his garage (the longest neck was a standard guitar, the second-longest neck an octave higher, the shortest was an eight-string mandolin). He presented a double-neck to Joe Maphis, a Los Angeles-area TV performer of country music. He also made several similar twin-neck guitars (with the performer's name inlaid into the neck) for Maphis' protegé, the child prodigy guitarist Larry Collins, who still owns his three Mosrite twin-necks. By 1956, with an investment from Ray Boatright, a local Los Angeles Foursquare Gospel minister, Semie and Andy Moseley started their company, Mosrite of California. In gratitude to Reverend Boatright, they named the company by combining their last names; the name is properly pronounced MOZE-rite, based on the pronunciation of Moseley. Moseley, who built guitars for the L.A.-based Rickenbacker company, told his co-workers that he was making his own product and was fired by Rickenbacker.

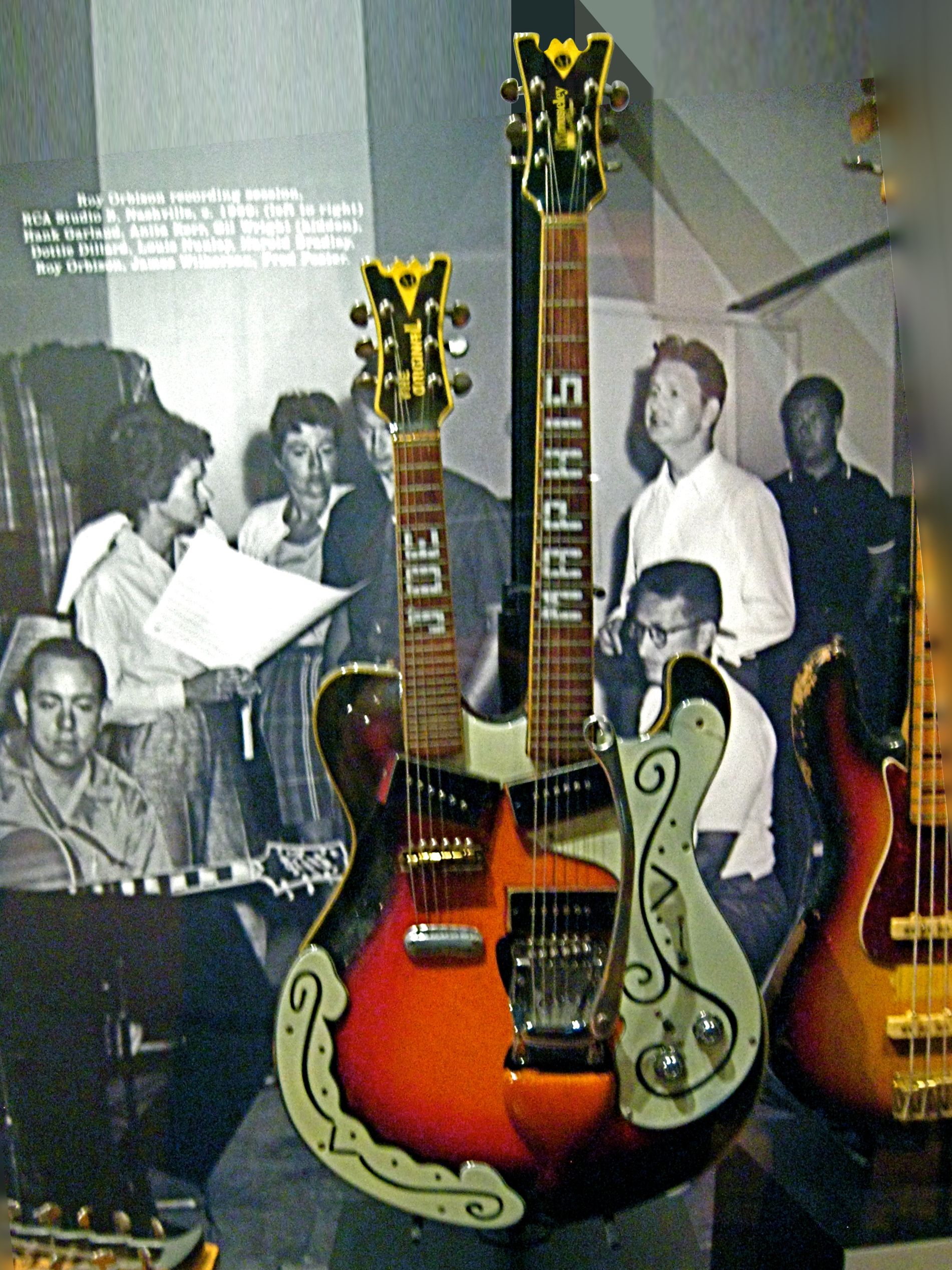
Joe Maphis's double-neck by Mosrite

When they began, their production was all custom, handmade guitars, built in garages, tin storage sheds, wherever the Moseleys could put equipment.

In 1959, Andy moved to Nashville, Tennessee, for a year to popularize the Mosrite name and sold a few, including to Grand Ole Opry entertainers and road musicians. Andy said: "And that’s how we kept the factory going at the time: custom guitars".

Moseley made guitars in Los Angeles until 1959, when he moved to Oildale, California, just north of Bakersfield. In 1962, he moved his shop to Panama Lane where he designed and produced the first Joe Maphis model guitars, one model of which would eventually evolve into the "Ventures model" guitar and bass (Joe Maphis would later get a model of his own, similar to a Mosrite Combo model but without the F-hole). At this time, Mosrite made everything in-house, except for the tuners.

Mosrite pickups after the 50s usually came in several ways through Mosrite's history, none with metal casing; 1: the large single coil similar to (but not as long as) a P-90, 2: a cheaper version of the first pickup that showed on cheaper models (Celebrity III, Mark V), 3: a cheaper pickup only found on the first iteration of the Ventures II and 4: a Mosrite Humbucker mostly found on some 1970s models.

The full Ventures line consisted of "the Ventures model" (as several versions: a 6-string guitar, 4-string bass, and 12-string guitar - the "Mark I", "Mark X", and "Mark XII" versions, respectively), "the Ventures II model" (of several versions), and "the Ventures Mark V model". "The Ventures" line started in 1963 and ran through 1967 or 1968 when the licensing agreement with the Ventures ended.

At the peak of production, in 1968, Mosrite was making around 600 guitars per month.

=== Bankruptcy and restart ===
Mosrite of California went bankrupt in late 1968 after they contracted with the Thomas Organ Company to market their guitars. After this, they tried to deal directly with stores, and they sold 280 guitars in 1969 before they came to the shop one day in February and found their doors pad-locked. Two years after his bankruptcy, Moseley was able to get back the Mosrite name, and in 1970 he started making guitars again in Pumpkin Center near Bakersfield. He moved his factory three times in the next 20 years, to Oklahoma City in the mid-1970s, to the township of Jonas Ridge, in Burke County, North Carolina, in 1981 (where a factory fire destroyed the operation), and to Leachville, Arkansas, in 1991.

== Notable players ==
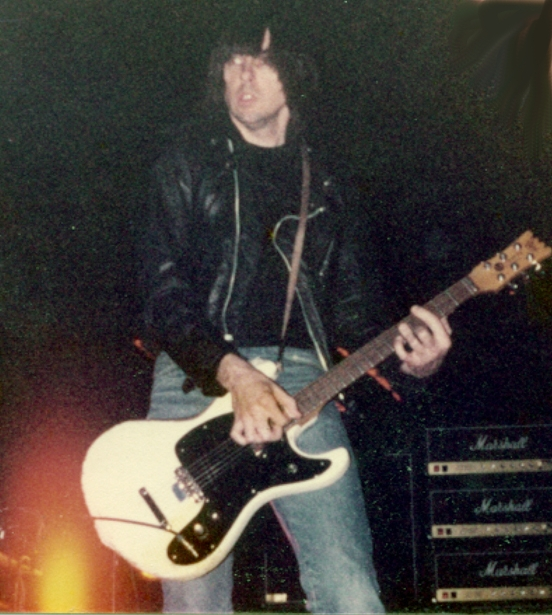
Johnny Ramone playing his primary guitar, a white 1965 Ventures II "Slab Body" model (his primary guitar from 1977 to 1996.)

- Leroy "Sugarfoot" Bonner of the Ohio Players is known for his double-necked Joe Maphis model
- Kurt Cobain of Nirvana
- Nokie Edwards of the Ventures
- Art Greenhaw
- Merle Haggard
- Koichi Kawasaki of the Band Apart, who owns Mark I, Mark IV and four other models
- Joe Maphis
- Buck Owens
- Johnny Ramone of the Ramones
- Ricky Wilson of the B-52's who played Mosrite guitars in early recordings with unusual tunings on songs such as "Rock Lobster"
