= Don't Run Away =

Don't Run Away may refer to:

- Don't Run Away, a 1968 song by Sandie Shaw
- "Don't Run Away", a song by David Archuleta from the 2013 album No Matter How Far
- "Don't Run Away", a song by Antonina Armato from the 2012 soundtrack album Let It Shine
- "Don't Run Away", a song by Honeyz appearing as B-side on "End of the Line"
- Don't Run Away (program), a program by StandUp for Kids educating elementary and middle school students about the consequences and alternatives of running away

== See also ==
- "Ne t'enfuis pas", a song by Kate Bush with title meaning don't run away in French
