= The Surf Coasters =

Japanese surf band

- Origin: Tokyo, Japan
- Genres: Surf rock, psychedelic rock
- Years active: 1994–present
- Labels: Columbia, Victor, BMG
- Members: Shigeo Naka; Nobuhiro Kurita; Naotaka Seki; Kozue Ito
- Past members: Akikazu Hanaoka; Akira Kikuchi; Kiyomi Nishida; Koichi Miyake; Maki Yagi; Masashi Sakai; Tomo Sato
- Website: http://www.surfcoasters.com

The Surf Coasters (Japanese: ザ・サーフコースターズ Za Sāfukōsutāzu) are a Japanese surf band, started by Shigeo Naka in 1994.

== History ==
The band became known with their stint on the talent show television program Ebisu-Onsen, a show very similar in concept to the American program, Star Search on which the winning band would receive a recording contract.

Although the Surf Coasters did not win the competition, their success on the show led to a loyal fan following. They succeeded to make it into the final round of the competition, where they finished in second place; however, they still received a record deal, which led to the release of their debut CD, Surf Panic '95, which, despite being an instrumental album, sold well. The band also played that year with surf music legend and "King of the Surf Guitar", Dick Dale, who was on his first tour of Japan. Reportedly, after the tour Dale referred to Naka as the "Prince of the Surf Guitar.".

Since then, the band has released upwards of twenty records, for the Columbia, Victor and BMG record labels, and have become the number one instrumental band across Japan. Their sound has varied since 1995, including dancehall, acoustic arrangements, blues, and heavy metal. Naka has also gone on to record, with and without the rest of the band, on other musical projects, including soundtracks for film and video games. Shigeo Naka was a guest guitarist playing the song "Test Driver" and Naka's own composition, "The Clash", with Takeshi Terauchi & Blue Jeans on their 1996 album, Catch a Wave.

Kurita has been playing bass with his band Chill.

== Other band members ==
- Nobuhiro Kurita, who joined the band on bass in 1997. During the band's first American tour, Kurita was dubbed "Zen Punk" for his cartoonish presence. He began playing the bass after being encouraged to do so by a friend in junior high school.
- Naotaka Seki, a drummer who was recruited by Naka into the band in 2001, while touring with Ryouchi Endo. He began drumming after seeing Munetaka Higuchi, drummer for the band Loudness, and deciding that he looked cool.

== Discography ==
=== Albums ===
- Surf Panic '95 (1995)
- Surfside Village (1995)
- Waitin' 4 The Surf (1995)
- Surface Impression (1996)
- Surfdelicious (1996)
- Surfin' Elvis / The Pelvis (1997)
- Surfdelic (Fun House, 1998)
- NakaShigeo plays Paul Mauriat (1999)
- The Surf Coasters (1999)
- Surf is Dead (2000)
- 六人ノ刺客 (Six Assassins) (2000)
- Easter!! (2001)
- L'Esprit (2002)
- Surf Attack (2003)
- p.m. (2003)
- Private Recordings Vol.1 / The Surf Coasters featuring 中シゲヲ (2004)
- Samurai Struck (U.S.A. ISSUE) (2005)
- Samurai Struck (JAPAN ISSUE) (2005)
- Live (Pullup, 2006)
- Outside Break (Fivenine Factory, 2008)
- Breakout (Fivenine Factory, 2008)
- Gold (Indies House/Finger, 2010)
- Rising (78label, 2016)

=== Best Of compilations ===
- Fly Up!! Best of The Surf Coasters Vol.1 (Invitation, 2000)
- Misirlou 10th Anniversary Best (Victor, 2004)
- Anthology 20th Anniversary Collection (Victor, 2014)
- Extras (Vivid Sound Corporation/Steps, 2020)

=== Singles/EPs ===
- Intruder (Mini CD single)(Victor, 1995)
- Wild Cherry (12" EP)(Victor, 1996)
- Astral Circle (Mini CD single)(Victor, 1996)
- Light My Fire (Inter, 2002)

=== Video game soundtracks ===
- Soundtrack from "Runabout" (1997)
- Super Runabout (1999)
- Runabout3 neoAGE (2002)

=== DVDs ===
- On Stage (2004)
