= Pumpkin Center, California =

Unincorporated community in California, United States

- Unincorporated community Census-designated place
- Location in California Pumpkin Center, California (the United States)
- Coordinates: 35°15′55.09″N 119°1′56.68″W
- Country: United States
- State: California
- County: Kern County

Area
  - Total: 0.467 sq mi (1.21 km^{2})
  - Land: 0.467 sq mi (1.21 km^{2})
  - Water: 0 sq mi (0 km^{2})
- Elevation: 351 ft (107 m)

Population (2020)
  - Total: 421
  - Density: 901/sq mi (348/km^{2})
- Time zone: UTC-8 (Pacific)
  - Summer (DST): UTC-7 (PDT)
- GNIS feature ID: 2804427

Pumpkin Center is an unincorporated community and census-designated place (CDP) in Kern County, California. It is located 7.5 miles (12.1 km) south-southwest of downtown Bakersfield, at an elevation of 351 feet (107 m). As of the 2020 census, Pumpkin Center had a population of 421.

Pumpkin Center is located at the intersection of State Route 99 (SR 99) and SR 119 (Taft Highway). On both Interstate 5 and SR 99, there is signage at the SR 119 exit directing travelers to Pumpkin Center.

"The White House" historical landmark was established in 1925. The landmark has four original trees that have grown taller than the buildings.

A post office opened in Pumpkin Center in 1945.

== Demographics ==
Historical population
Census	Pop.	Note	%±
2020	421		—
U.S. Decennial Census; 1860–1870 1880-1890; 1900 1910 1920; 1930 1940 1950; 1960 1970 1980; 1990 2000 2010; 2020

Pumpkin Center first appeared as a census designated place in the 2020 U.S. census.

=== 2020 Census ===
Pumpkin Center CDP, California – Racial and ethnic composition Note: the US Census treats Hispanic/Latino as an ethnic category. This table excludes Latinos from the racial categories and assigns them to a separate category. Hispanics/Latinos may be of any race.
Race / Ethnicity (NH = Non-Hispanic)	Pop 2020	% 2020
White alone (NH)	114	27.08%
Black or African American alone (NH)	2	0.48%
Native American or Alaska Native alone (NH)	1	0.24%
Asian alone (NH)	9	2.14%
Native Hawaiian or Pacific Islander alone (NH)	0	0.00%
Other race alone (NH)	7	1.66%
Mixed race or Multiracial (NH)	9	2.14%
Hispanic or Latino (any race)	279	66.27%
Total	421	100.00%
