= Walk, Don't Run (instrumental) =

1954 composition by Johnny Smith

"Walk, Don't Run" is an instrumental composition written and originally recorded by jazz guitarist Johnny Smith in 1954, which achieved worldwide fame with The Ventures adapted version in 1960.

Earlier an adapted version was recorded by Chet Atkins in 1956, and was a track on his LP Hi-Fi In Focus. This arrangement was the inspiration for the version by the Ventures in 1960 (though the Ventures' arrangement is recognizably different from Atkins' finger-picked style) and achieved world-wide recognition, being regarded by Rolling Stone as one of the 100 Greatest Guitar Songs of All Time.

== Johnny Smith ==
"Walk, Don't Run" was written by Smith in 1954, who was inspired by the song "Softly, as in a Morning Sunrise" by Romberg and Hammerstein. Smith, as a jazz guitarist, composed "Walk, Don't Run" as a contrafact, basing his melody around the Andalusian cadence chord progression from "Softly...", which he keyed in D minor. Smith included the piece on his 1954 album In a Sentimental Mood using a title chosen by his producer, Teddy Reig. It was also on Smith's 1956 album Moods.

In 1967, Johnny Smith recorded a new and more up-tempo arrangement with Hank Jones, George Duvivier, and Don Lamond on his album Johnny Smith's Kaleidoscope.

In 1998, Smith was awarded the James Smithson Bicentennial Medal for his contribution to music; the citation singled out "the genesis of 'Walk, Don't Run'", as well as "his manifold accomplishments" and their "profound and pervasive influence on the role of the guitar in contemporary popular culture".

== Chet Atkins ==
In 1957, Chet Atkins recorded a popular rendition of the song for his album Hi-Fi in Focus, after discussing the matter with Smith, who was pleased with the arrangement. Atkins played his arrangement in A minor, using fingerstyle and including the bass notes A, G, F, and E. This later became the basis for the Ventures' arrangement. Other cover versions include those by the Shadows, Agent Orange, Zapatón, Steve Howe, Glen Campbell, Herb Alpert and the Tijuana Brass, Tommy Leonetti, and the Penguin Cafe Orchestra.

== The Ventures recording ==
"Walk, Don't Run"

Single by The Ventures

from the album Walk, Don't Run
- B-side: "Home" (Blue Horizon & first Dolton (No. 25) pressings, British pressing); "The McCoy" (later Dolton (No. 25-X) pressings)
- Released: May 1960
- Genre: Instrumental rock, surf rock
- Length: 2:00
- Label: Blue Horizon (USA); Dolton (USA), Reo (Canada), Top Rank (UK)
- Songwriter: Johnny Smith

The Ventures singles chronology
"The Real McCoy" (1959)	"Walk, Don't Run" (1960)	"Perfidia" (1960)

After hearing a Chet Atkins recording of "Walk, Don't Run", the Tacoma-based instrumental rock band the Ventures released their version of the tune as a single in spring 1960 on Dolton Records. This version made the Billboard Hot 100 chart, peaking at number two and kept out of the number-one spot by "It's Now or Never" by Elvis Presley. "Walk, Don't Run" also made the US Hot R&B Sides chart, where it went to number 13. The instrumental reached number three on the Cash Box chart for five weeks in August and September 1960. In Canada, the song reached number one on August 29, 1960. The Dolton release of this record had two backing sides, the first release (Dolton 25) had "Home", and after initial sales were so great, the B-side was replaced with a Bogle–Wilson original composition, "The McCoy" (Dolton 25-X), to gain royalties.

Personnel on this record were Bob Bogle – lead guitar, Don Wilson – rhythm guitar, Nokie Edwards – bass, and Skip Moore – drums. It was recorded and engineered by Joe Boles, who had a basement studio in his home in Seattle, Washington. He also engineered the band's first two albums. Their adapation of the music also employs the musical structure known as the Andalusian cadence, which originated from Flamenco.

This single, the Ventures' first national release, became a huge hit and vaulted the group to stardom. The song was recorded before the band officially had a drummer. The Ventures' website lists the drummer on "Walk, Don't Run" as Skip Moore. Moore was not interested in touring and never was a full-time member of the band. As payment for his session work, Moore was given the choice of $25 (equivalent to $270 in 2025) or 25% of any royalties from sales of the single. He took the $25. Bob Bogle played the lead guitar part on this first Ventures recording of the song. The band later rerecorded the song in 1964 (see below) and became the first band to score two top-10 hits with two versions of the same tune.

"Walk, Don't Run" was included on the compilation album 15 Hits: The Original Recordings released by Liberty Records in 1962. In 1991, the song also was included on the compilation CD 24 Greatest Hits of All Time in the EMI Legends of Rock n' Roll Series.

In the UK, the tune was covered by the John Barry Seven, whose version, while only peaking at number 11 on the Record Retailer chart, compared to the Ventures' number eight, outcharted them by reaching the top 10 on other UK charts, such as that of the NME.

In July 2003, the tune was recorded by Ventures guitarist Nokie Edwards and the Light Crust Doughboys for the album Guitars Over Texas. This version is known for its jazz-inflected second verse and the use of keyboards in place of rhythm guitar.

=== Critical reception ===
Rolling Stone rated the Ventures' version of "Walk, Don't Run" as number 82 on their list of the 100 Greatest Guitar Songs of All Time.

=== Walk, Don't Run '64 ===
"Walk, Don't Run '64"

Single by The Ventures

from the album Walk, Don't Run, Vol. 2
- B-side: "The Cruel Sea"
- Released: 1964
- Length: 2:23
- Label: Dolton No.96 (USA)
- Songwriter: Johnny Smith

The Ventures singles chronology
"Fugitive" (1963)	"Walk, Don't Run '64" (1964)	"Memphis" (1964)

"Walk, Don't Run '64" is an updated Ventures recording that features a guitar style more similar to that of "Misirlou" and is notable for starting with a "fade-in" (as opposed to many songs of the era that ended with a "fade out"). In this version, the lead guitarist and bass player from the original switched roles, with Edwards handling the lead parts and Bogle the bass. It reached number eight on the Billboard Hot 100 chart, and number 9 on the Cash Box chart in 1964. In Canada, the song reached number 24.

The B-side, "The Cruel Sea", was a version of the Dakotas' 1963 single. Both recordings featured Nokie Edwards playing the lead guitar part.

The recording was used in 2000 for the dancing scene in the Australian movie The Goddess of 1967 by Clara Law.

== Selected recorded versions ==
- 1954: Johnny Smith
- 1957: Chet Atkins
- 1960: The Ventures
- 1960: The John Barry Seven (featuring Vic Flick on guitar)
- 1960: Les Fantômes
- 1963: Bijele Strijele
- 1963: Count Basie (arranged by Quincy Jones)
- 1964: Tommy Leonetti produced by Chet Atkins (a vocal version with lyrics written by Dottie Faye)
- 1965: Glen Campbell
- 1965: Herb Alpert and the Tijuana Brass
- 1967: Johnny Smith
- 1971: Led Zeppelin Live in Los Angeles, CA (The Ventures version)
- 1972: Pink Fairies
- 1973: Sha Na Na
- 1974: Mike Auldridge
- 1977: The Shadows
- 1981: The Penguin Cafe Orchestra
- 1983: JFA (band) (Jodie Foster's Army)
- 1984: Kazumi Watanabe
- 1992: Those Darn Accordions, performed entirely on accordions
- 1992: Robert Fripp, on Kan Non Power
- 1993: California Guitar Trio
- 1994: Jeff Beck Little Big League soundtrack (The Ventures version)
- 1998: Steve Howe
- 1998: The Trashmen on compilation Bird Call!
- 1999: Johnny A.
- 2003: Nokie Edwards and the Light Crust Doughboys
- 2004: Terrafolk (as a medley featuring also "Music for a Found Harmonium")

== Appearances in feature length films ==
- 1988: Aloha Summer
- 1988: Crocodile Dundee II
- 1992: The Rocking Horsemen
- 1993: Wayne's World 2
- 1993: Matinee
- 1999: American Pie
- 2000: The Goddess of 1967
- 2010: Flipped
- 2014: Pawn Sacrifice

== See also ==
- List of jazz contrafacts
