= Don Wilson (musician) =

American guitarist (1933–2022)

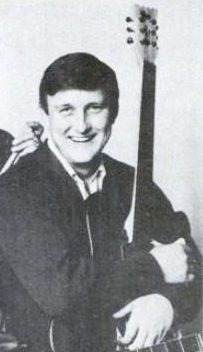
- Wilson in 1967

Background information
- Also known as: Don Dixon; Don Lee Wilson
- Born: Donald Leroy Wilson; February 10, 1933; Tacoma, Washington, U.S.
- Died: January 22, 2022 (aged 88) Tacoma, Washington, U.S.
- Genres: Rock n roll; blues; rock; psychedelic rock
- Occupations: Musician; composer; arranger; producer
- Instruments: Guitar
- Years active: 1958–2015
- Formerly of: The Ventures

Donald Leroy Wilson (February 10, 1933 – January 22, 2022) was an American guitarist who, with Bob Bogle, was a founding member of the instrumental surf-rock group the Ventures. In 2008, Wilson and other members of the band were inducted into the Rock and Roll Hall of Fame in the Performer category. Wilson was the last surviving member of the classic lineup of the Ventures following the death of Nokie Edwards in 2018, before Wilson's own death in January 2022.

== Early life ==
Wilson was born in Tacoma, Washington and was a middle child. The family heritage is mixed, his mother, Josie, was first-generation Swedish, while his father was of Welsh and Irish descent. His mother would show him how to play chords on the tiple when he was around 12 years old.

== Career ==
In 1958, Wilson and Bob Bogle met Nokie Edwards and they invited him to be a member of the group. Originally Edwards played bass, but later played lead guitar with Bogle switching to bass. In 1960, Wilson's mother, Josie, encouraged them to record a cover of Chet Atkins' instrumental version of Johnny Smith's composition "Walk, Don't Run". Unable to play his finger-style version, they re-arranged it in their own style. The lineup at the time consisted of Wilson, Bogle, Edwards and Skip Moore, later replaced by Howie Johnson (drums), before Johnson was replaced with Mel Taylor, however on "Walk-Dont Run" and the B side "Home", Skip Moore, a local drummer, played drums. "Walk, Don't Run" reached number two on the Billboard Hot 100, and has been described as what "started a whole new movement in rock & roll" by John Fogerty.

The Ventures' song "Wild Child" was sampled by the Wiseguys on "Start the Commotion", giving Wilson his only hit writing credit on the British charts, reaching number 47 and spending 2 weeks on the chart.

In 1968, they released a single titled "Hawaii Five-O" the theme tune to the show of the same name which reached #4 in the US and became their 2nd biggest hit. Some of the group's other notable songs include 'Perfidia', "Lullaby of The Leaves', 'Fugitive', 'Apache', 'Diamond Head' and 'Slaughter on Tenth Avenue'. Wilson continued to tour with the Ventures until 2015, when he retired. Since then the band has continued to perform without any original members. Wilson was present when the Ventures were inducted into the Rock and Roll Hall of Fame in 2008.

The Ventures have since released over 250 studio albums, 150 singles and 80 compilation albums, and have left a large impact on instrumental music. Eddie Van Halen is among one of many musicians who have been influenced by the band; with Halen quoting their song Pipeline to have been one of the first songs he learned how to play on the guitar.

Wilson's rhythmic, aggressive guitar style earned him the title 'Mr Tiki-tiki' in Japan and Ventures concerts always featured two Wilson vocals, but his efforts as a solo artist did not succeed in emulating the success of The Ventures.

== Personal life and death ==
Wilson's daughter Staci Layne-Wilson is a writer and filmmaker who directed a documentary about the Ventures titled The Ventures: Stars on Guitars in 2020. Wilson died of natural causes on January 22, 2022, aged 88. He was the last surviving member of his band's classic lineup.

== Discography ==
Wilson's recorded work was mainly instrumental with The Ventures, but he did record and release many vocals in his own name that were released as singles and later on vinyl album and CD in the USA, Japan and the UK. They are not listed in the Ventures discography.

- Note: Dates in brackets denote date of recording. Dates without brackets denote release date.

=== Don Wilson USA solo record releases ===
- Don Dixon. 7" 45. Cry of the Wild Goose/ For your Love. Blue Horizon 6051. USA. 1960.
- Don Wilson. 7" 45. The Twomp/ Heart on my Sleeve. Blue Horizon 6054. 1962
- Don Lee Wilson. 7" 45. Tell Laura I love Her/ Angel. Imperial 60664. 1964
- Don Lee Wilson. 7" 45. (Gul durn it) What d'I Say/ T'aint Funny. Imperial 66038. 1964
- Don Wilson. 7" 45. Forever and Ever/ Angel. Unity CP2117. 1964
- Don Lee Wilson. 7" 45. Feel so Fine/ Angel. Imperial 66091. 1965
- Don Lee Wilson. 7" 45. No Matter what shape (your stomach's in)/ Angel. Liberty 55862. 1966
- Don Lee Wilson. 7" 45. Don't Avoid Me/ Angel. Liberty 55872. 1966
- Don Lee Wilson. 7" 45. Don't Avoid Me/ Sally. Liberty 55890. 1966
- Don Lee Wilson. 7" 45. Kiss Tomorrow Goodbye/ Sally. Liberty 55946.1967
- Don Lee Wilson. 7" 45. Seattle in the Rain/ How can I help you Girl. L&M WO 100. 1967
- Don Lee Wilson. 7" 45. Tell Laura I love her/ Bad Boy. Tridex 101. 1967
- Don Wilson . CD The Ventures and the Fabulous Wailers. Two Car Garage. Blue Horizon BH 100-1. 2008.

I hear you knockin' keep knockin', Needles and Pins, When you walk in the room.

- Don Wilson. 7" 45. I never did know when to go home/ My mind is filled with you. Blaze Music BL-101. Date unknown

== Don Wilson Japan solo record releases ==
- Don Wilson. 7" 45. Feel so Fine/ Angel. Liberty LR-1436. 1965
- Don Wilson. 7" 45. Feel so Fine/ Forever and Ever/ Angel/ Tell Laura I love her. Liberty LP-4112. 1966
- Don Wilson. 7" 45. Pied Piper/ La Bamba (with The Ventures). Liberty LR-1577. 1966
- Don Wilson. 7" 45. Runaway/ Sally. Liberty LR-2550. 1970
- Don Wilson. 7" 45. Moody River/ Pied Piper. Liberty LLR-10583. 1974
- Don Wilson. 2 vinyl 12" Album set. The Ventures for Great Collectors Only. King K18P-12-13. 1980.

What d'I Say (1964), Sally (1966 ), Feel so Fine (1965), Behind these stained glass windows ( 1966), T'aint Funny (1964), Angel (1965), Don't avoid me (1966), Tell Laura I love her (1964), Kiss tomorrow goodbye (1967).

- Don Wilson. 4 CD Set. The Ventures History Boxed Set Volume 3. Toshiba TOCP-7133-36. 1992.

Kiss tomorrow goodbye (1967).

- Don Wilson. 4 CD Set. The Ventures History Boxed Set Volume 4. Toshiba TOCP-7137-40. 1992.

Feel so fine (1965), Angel (1965),

- Don Wilson. 4 CD Set. The Ventures History Boxed Set Volume 5. Toshiba TOCP-7141-44. 1992.

Hey there Sunshine (1966), Behind these stained glass windows (1966), Kiss tomorrow goodbye (1967), Sally (1966).

- Don Wilson CD. The Ventures play 'Runaway'. Don Wilson's Favorite Vocals. M&I. MYCV-30005. 1999.

1.Runaway (1999), 2. Needles and Pins (1983), 3. Black is Black (1999), 4. Keep Searchin' (1999), 5. When you walk in the Room (1983), 6. Hats off to Larry (1999), 7.So Fine (1965), 8. End of the World (1965), 9. Caribbean (1995), 10. The Wind blows East (1995), 11. Born to Lose (1965), 12. Steady as she goes (1983), 13. Detroit City (1965), 14. Yesterday (1965), 15. I forgot to remember to forget (1965), 16. I can't stop loving you (1965).

- Don Wilson 5 CD Boxed set. Arigato Japan! Don Wilson Special Box. M&I. MYCV-30648. 2015.

CD 5 contains Don Wilson's vocals: Hello Mary Lou (2015), Rebel Rouser – Detour – Ghost Riders in the Sky (This medley featured Don Wilson playing lead guitar 2015), The Twomp (2015), Whole lot of Shakin' going on – I got a Woman (2015), Runaway (1999), Needles And Pins (1983), Black is Black (1999), Keep Searchin' (1999), When you walk in the Room (1983), Hats off to Larry (1999), So Fine (1965), End of the World (1965), Caribbean (1995), The Wind blows East (1995), Born to Lose (1965), Steady as she goes (1983), Detroit City (1965), Yesterday (1965), I forgot to remember to forget (1965), I can't stop loving you (1965).

- Don Wilson. 4 CD boxed set. Japanese singles Collection. Universal UICY-77116-20. 2015.

Feel so fine (1965), Angel (1966), Runaway (1999), Sally (1966).

=== Don Wilson UK solo record releases ===
- Don Lee Wilson. CD. The Ventures in the Vaults Volume 4. Ace Records CDCHD 1176. 2007.

Like you've never known before (unreleased), Don't avoid me (1966), Heart on my Sleeve (1962), The Twomp (unreleased version from 1960 as Don Wilson), Runaway (1970), Feel so Fine (1965).

- Don Lee Wilson. CD. The Ventures in the Vaults Volume 5. Ace Records CDCHD 1407. 2014.

I want you to want me (unreleased), How can I help you girl (1967), Let the four winds blow (unreleased), For your love (1960 as Don Dixon).
