= Nokie Edwards =

American musician (1935–2018)

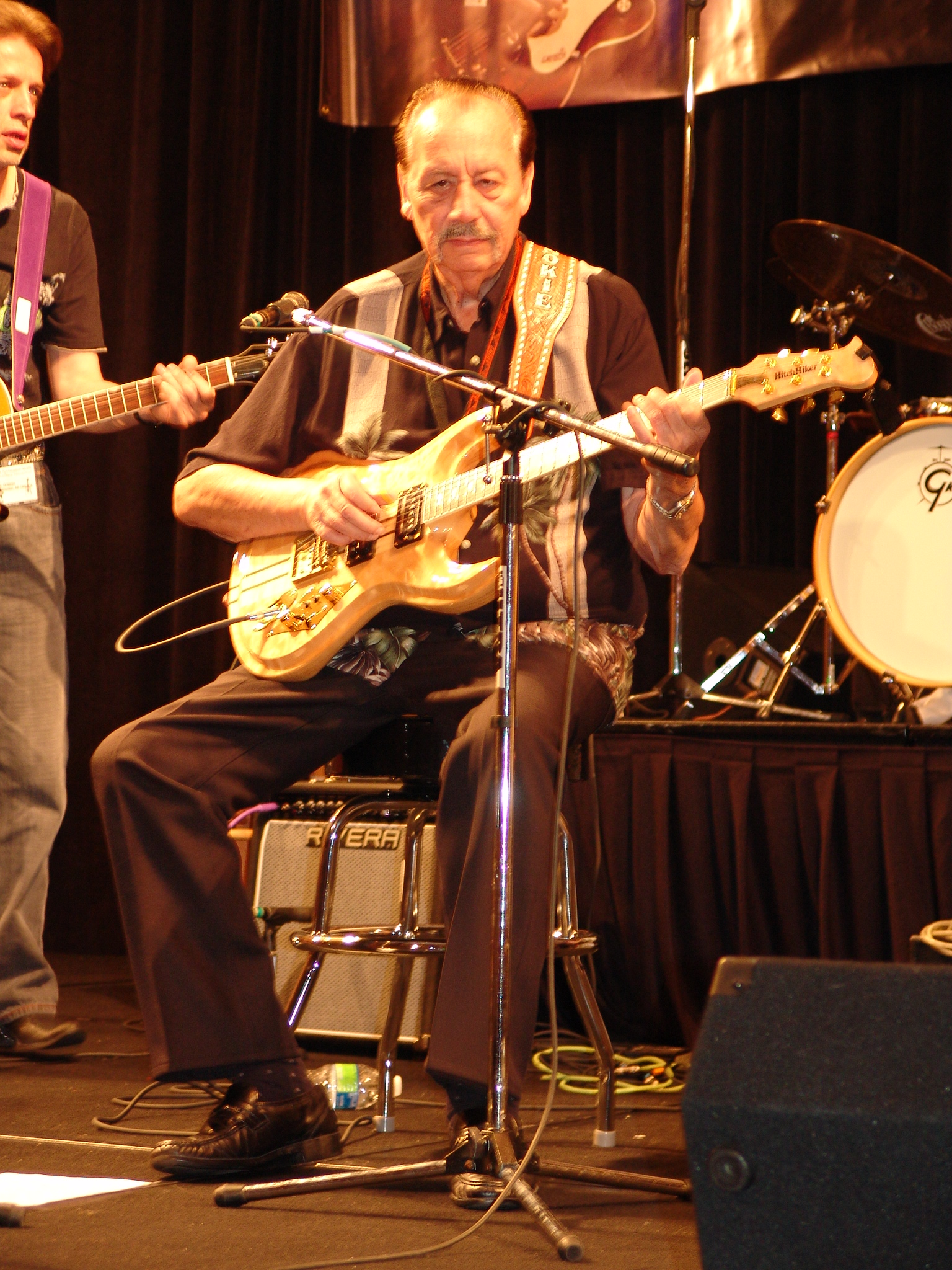
- Edwards in Nashville at the Chet Atkins Appreciation Society, 2009

Background information
- Born: Nole Floyd Edwards; May 9, 1935; Lahoma, Oklahoma, U.S.
- Died: March 12, 2018 (aged 82) Yuma, Arizona, U.S.
- Genres: Instrumental rock; surf rock
- Occupation: Musician
- Instruments: Guitar; bass guitar; sitar
- Years active: 1958–2017
- Formerly of: The Ventures

Nole Floyd "Nokie" Edwards (May 9, 1935 – March 12, 2018) was an American musician and member of the Rock and Roll Hall of Fame. He was primarily a guitarist, best known for his work with The Ventures, and was known in Japan as the 'King of Guitars'. Edwards was also an actor, who appeared briefly on Deadwood, an American Western drama television series.

== Early life ==
Edwards was born in Lahoma, Oklahoma, the son of Elbert Edwards and Nannie Mae Quinton Edwards, an original enrollee of the Western Cherokee. Edwards came from a family of accomplished musicians, and by age five he had begun playing a variety of string instruments, including the steel guitar, banjo, mandolin, violin, and bass. His family relocated from Oklahoma to Puyallup, Washington.

During Edwards' late teen years he joined the United States Army Reserve. After traveling to Texas and California for training, he returned home and began playing regularly for pay in numerous country bands in the area.

== Music career ==
In January 1958, country songwriter and guitarist Buck Owens relocated from California to Tacoma, Washington, as the owner of radio station KAYE. Prior to the formation of The Buckaroos with Don Rich, Edwards played guitar with Owens in the new band he formed in the area, and also played in the house band of television station KTNT, located in the same building as KAYE. In 1960 Edwards recorded a single, "Night Run" b/w "Scratch", on Blue Horizon Records with a band called The Marksmen.

=== The Ventures ===
The Ventures, an instrumental musical quartet, were founded in Tacoma, Washington, in 1958. Original members included Don Wilson on rhythm guitar, Bob Bogle on lead guitar (who later became the bass player), and drummer George Babbitt, who went on to become a 4-star general in the U.S. Air Force. When Babbitt left, Howie Johnson took his place and was later replaced by Mel Taylor. Edwards met Wilson and Bogle when they performed on KTNT. Edwards originally played bass for The Ventures, but he took over the lead guitar position from Bogle. The Ventures released a series of best-selling albums throughout the 1960s, and Edwards left towards the end of this period in 1968. He returned full-time as the Ventures' lead guitarist in 1972 and stayed with the band until 1984. In subsequent years, he would occasionally reunite with the band, and starting in the early 2000s, he once again toured with The Ventures until 2012. During his last stint with the Ventures, Edwards primarily played during the annual winter Japan tour, along with several dates in the United States.

=== Other work ===
In 1971, Edwards began a solo career with the release of Nokie!. While he released an album each year through 1974, his solo attempt was unsuccessful in America, and he suspended his solo efforts to concentrate on further recordings with the Ventures. Upon leaving the Ventures a second time in 1984, Edwards pursued a music career in Nashville, Tennessee. He played lead guitar for Lefty Frizzell, on what would become Frizzell's final recording sessions. Throughout the 1980s and 1990s, he was involved with numerous country-influenced recording projects and relaunched his solo career with the release of several albums starting in 1988.

Edwards performed occasionally in the United States as both a soloist and member of various bands, including AdVenture, Art Greenhaw, and Texas Western swing outfit The Light Crust Doughboys. The fruitful and critically acclaimed collaboration of Edwards and artist-producer Greenhaw, resulted in a number of albums in several music genres including Edwards' two nominations for "Grammy Award for Best Southern, Country or Bluegrass Gospel Album of the Year", album titles 20th Century Gospel (2005) and Southern Meets Soul (2006). AllMusic noted about the 20th Century Gospel album that the "former Ventures member Nokie Edwards guests on several tracks ("Ode to Joy," "The Great Speckled Bird") and his sound has never been twangier".

In July 2010, Deke Dickerson announced on his Facebook page that he was currently working on a new studio album with Nokie Edwards. Dickerson and his band backed Edwards for several shows, including Deke's yearly Guitar Geek Festival held in Anaheim, California.

In 2011, Nokie Edwards, of Cherokee heritage, was inducted into the Native American Music Awards Hall of Fame.

=== Rock and Roll Hall of Fame ===
In 2008, Edwards was inducted into the Rock and Roll Hall of Fame, along with The Ventures. The award was presented by John Fogerty. The band performed their biggest hits, "Walk Don't Run" and "Hawaii Five-0", augmented on the latter by Rock and Roll Hall of Fame musical director Paul Shaffer and his band.

== Acting career ==
After accepting an offer to pursue an acting career, Edwards landed a role on Deadwood, an American Western drama television series. Edwards played the mysterious friend of Wild Bill Hickok and a local citizen, who serves as a bridge between the villains and heroes of the show. During production, Edwards temporarily relocated to Santa Clarita, California and lived on the set's location with his wife Judy.

== Equipment ==
=== Mosrite Guitars ===
Edwards had a long association with Mosrite. In 1963, Edwards introduced the other members of the Ventures to Semie Moseley, which led to a five-year association between Mosrite and the band. During this time, Edwards and the band used and popularized the Ventures Model Mosrite guitars. Several notable features of the Ventures Model include hot single-pole pickups, a light-touch tremolo, zero fret, a sloped-back tilt headstock, and a German carve body.

In the mid-1980s, Edwards rekindled his relationship with Moseley, and Moseley designed the Mosrite Nokie Model, an update of the Ventures Model. A custom Anniversary version of the Nokie Model came with a metallic blue finish and white accents.

=== Fender Telecaster and Jazzmaster ===
Edwards played Fender Telecasters and Jazzmasters during the 1950s and early 1960s, before switching to Mosrite guitars. For solo projects and with the Ventures, he also toured and recorded with Telecasters at various times during the 1970s, 1980s, and 1990s.

In 1996, Fender released the Nokie Edwards Custom Signature model Telecaster, which was designed by Edwards. The limited-edition guitar featured gold hardware, an ebony fingerboard, sloped-back tilted headstock, a zero fret, sealed tuners, and Seymour Duncan humbucker pickups with split coils.

=== HitchHiker guitars ===
Edwards designed and recently sold his own custom guitar, the HitchHiker, a hybrid of the best elements of the Fender Telecaster and Mosrite guitars. The HitchHiker features a sloped-back tilt headstock, a neck-through-body with swamp ash and quilted maple, zero fret, gold control plates, Seymour Duncan humbuckers with split coils, and an ebony fingerboard. Its bridge works on a slide scale invented by Edwards. The HitchHiker can simulate an acoustic guitar and provides 15 different sound selections. The body design is essentially the original Mosrite body, which Edwards preferred. The hybrid guitars are being crafted in New River, Arizona.

=== Dual Blade Humbucker Pickup ===
Edwards designed the Nokie Edwards Dual Blade Humbucker Pickup. Manufactured and sold by Seymour Duncan, it produces tones similar to Nokie's Telecaster and HitchHiker guitar models.

== Death ==
Edwards died in Yuma, Arizona after complications from a hip surgery, at the age of 82.

== Discography ==
- Nokie! (1971)
- Again! (1972)
- King of Guitars (1973)
- Glorious Guitarist (1974)
- Terry vs. Nokie, with Takeshi Terauchi (1986)
- Terry Terauchi & Nokie Edwards 2, with Takeshi Terauchi (1987)
- Both Sides of Nokie (1988)
- Vol. 1 - The Greatest World Hits (1989)
- Vol. 2 - The Greatest Hits of the Ventures (1990)
- Merry X-Mas from Nokie Edwards (1992)
- Nokie and Friends (1994)
- 1995 Celebration (1995)
- Present for My Japanese Friends (1997)
- Carvin' It Out (1999)
- 1999 Plugged & Unplugged (1999)
- Pickin' It Up (2000)
- No Boundaries (2001)
- Hitchhiker (2003)
- Plays Gospel Music (2003)
- Just for Jake (2003)
- A Tribute to the Beatles (2004)
- Hitchhiker Heals Hearts (2004)
- Nokie Plays the 50s, 60s, and 70s (2005)
- Crossover (2005)
- Just Doing My Job (2006)
- The Golden Fingers of Nokie Edwards (2007)
- Guitar Band Classics (2008)
- Hitchin' a Ride (2009)
- Nokie Rocks The Ventures (2012)
- Nokie Plays Latin (2013)
- Songs for Healing Heart (2014)
- 80 & Pickin' with My Friends (2015)
- Picks On the Beatles (2020)
