= Dolton Records =

Record label

Dolton Records was a record label based in Seattle that was originally known as Dolphin Records. It was initially owned by Bob Reisdorff and Bonnie Guitar. Success for the label came early with "Come Softly to Me" by the Fleetwoods, the first single to be released on that label.

Reisdorf was soon informed that there was another Dolphin Records in circulation (which was a subsidiary of Laurie Records), so he changed the name to Dolton after the first release, the second release being an instrumental by the Frantics called "Straight Flush" b/w "Young Blues" (Dolton 2). The new label retained the fish symbols on the logo and the fonts associated with the Dolphin name.

The first major hit on the newer Dolton label was the Fleetwood's "Mr. Blue", a number one hit, and the fifth single released by that company. Other major Dolton artists included the Ventures, Vic Dana, and the Frantics. It was acquired in 1963 by Avnet and merged with its Liberty Records parent label in 1966. Liberty had distributed Dolton releases when "Come Softly to Me" became a hit.

Bonnie Guitar also recorded for the label, recording singles like "Candy Apple Red" (Dolton 10) in 1959. She had a country-pop crossover hit, "Dark Moon", in February 1957, which had been released on Dot Records (45-15550). She left Dolton in 1960 and started Jerden Records in the Seattle area.

Liberty discontinued the Dolton label in 1967, transferring its artists to the parent label. The label's final single released was "Theme From The Wild Angels"/"Kickstand" (DOR-327) by the Ventures; theirs was also the final album released on Dolton, "Guitar Freakout" (BLP-2050/BST-8050). Liberty and with it, Dolton, were absorbed into United Artists Records in 1971, which in turn was sold to EMI in 1979 and deactivated the next year.

In the early 1990s, EMI USA briefly reactivated the Dolton label by releasing a couple of CD compilations by the Ventures, using the early light-blue Dolton labels for the discs.

The Dolton catalog is managed at present by Capitol Records under Universal Music Group after buying most of Capitol's former owner EMI in 2012.

== Label variations ==
- (1) 1958—Light blue label with fish symbols at top of label, DOLPHIN shown vertically on left side (this variation was used only on the first release, Dolphin 1).
- (2) 1958-1960—Same as above, DOLPHIN changed to DOLTON
- (3) 1961-1963—Same light blue color with large fish symbols at top of label, DOLTON shown in center of largest fish symbol.
- (4) 1962-1965—Dark blue label with new logo on left side, DOLTON shown in various colors
- (5) 1965-1966—Black and dark blue label with "D" logo on left side, DOLTON shown under logo, "A PRODUCT OF LIBERTY RECORDS" shown under DOLTON

Promotional records for radio stations, etc. were white labels with varieties two and three until Dolton 40. Starting with Dolton 41 (1961), the promo labels were beige-colored and used varieties three and four. Most of the promotional records state "not for sale" or "audition record", but in some cases the promo copies did not state this, and are identified by the label color change alone.

== See also ==
- Jerden Records
- List of record labels
