= Mel Taylor =

American drummer (1933–1996)

Background information
- Born: September 24, 1933; Brownsville, Brooklyn, New York, U.S.
- Died: August 11, 1996 (aged 62) Tarzana, California, U.S.
- Genres: Surf rock
- Occupation: Drummer
- Years active: 1950s–1996
- Formerly of: The Ventures
- Relatives: Larry Taylor (brother)

Mel Taylor (September 24, 1933 – August 11, 1996) was an American musician who was the drummer for the Ventures from 1962 to 1996. He was born in Brownsville, Brooklyn, New York, and was the older brother of Canned Heat bassist Larry Taylor.

== Career ==
After drumming with Boris Pickett and Herb Alpert, Taylor joined the Ventures in 1962 to fill in for Howie Johnson, who had been severely injured in an automobile accident. Johnson played with a neck brace for a period, but didn't want to be away from his family (in Washington state) for long periods, so he opted to be replaced. Taylor's distinct, harder-edged rock style so impressed the members of the band that they asked him to become a permanent member of the group.

Taylor released a solo album in 1965 ("Mel Taylor & The Magics In Action"). In 1972, he decided to leave the Ventures to pursue a solo career, forming the band Mel Taylor & the Dynamics. During this time, they released four albums: "007 James Bond", "Sand, Sea and Love", "Mel Taylor in Japan", and "Roll over Beethoven". Taylor rejoined the Ventures in 1979, and remained their drummer until his death in 1996. After Mel died, his son Leon Taylor replaced him, and has been the Ventures' drummer ever since.

== Drumming style ==
Taylor used the traditional grip as opposed to the matched grip. He originally started out with The Ventures on a 4-piece drum kit with just hi-hats and a single cymbal. Towards the end of the 1960s, he expanded his kit to include multiple tom-toms and double bass drums; he eventually added numerous crash cymbals to his set as well. Taylor used many drum kits over the years including Rogers, Ludwig, Gretsch, and Canopus. Taylor preferred Zildjian cymbals, Pro-Mark drumsticks, and Remo drumheads.

== Influences ==
Taylor mentioned in many interviews that Gene Krupa, Buddy Rich, and Louie Bellson were some of his biggest influences while he was growing up, and that he got the double bass idea from Louie Bellson.

== Declining health and death ==
In July 1996, Taylor developed what was initially diagnosed as pneumonia while on tour with the Ventures in Japan. Doctors there found a malignant tumor in his lungs, but he continued to play with the band until a replacement drummer could be found for the remainder of their tour. On August 2, Taylor returned to Los Angeles, California, for more tests and treatment, but the cancer had advanced and metastasized so quickly that in less than 10 days he died on August 11, 1996, at the age of 62 in Tarzana Hospital, California. Mel was survived by his wife, Fiona, his six children, Rita, Sylvia, Leon, Michael Lee, Michael Richard and Jayme, as well as 11 grandchildren.

== Discography ==
- In Action! - Mel Taylor & The Magics (1966) Warner Brothers WB1624. USA.
- Drums A-Go-Go Mel Taylor and the Magics – In Action. (1966). BP 7461. Japan.
- 007 (1972) Dan Records VC-7501. Japan.
- Sand, Sea and Love (1972) Dan Records VC-7503. Japan.
- In Japan (1973) Dan Records VC-7506. Japan.
- Live in Japan (1973) Bad New Records BNCY-29 (CD released in 1997). Japan.
- Roll Over Beethoven (1973) Dan Records VC-7510. Japan.
- The Very Best of Mel Taylor (2002) M and I Records. MYCV 30141. Japan.

== See also ==
- Surf rock
- The Ventures
