= Bob Bogle =

American musician (1934–2009)

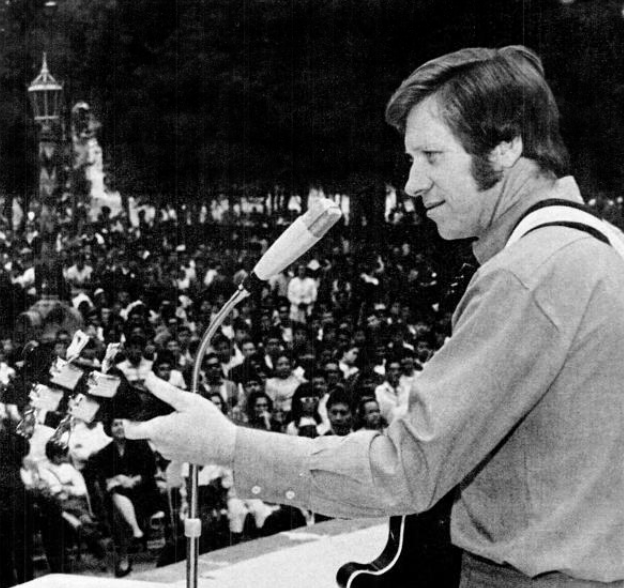
- Bogle in 1968

Background information
- Born: Robert Lenard Bogle; January 16, 1934 around Wagoner, Oklahoma, U.S.
- Died: June 14, 2009 (aged 75) Vancouver, Washington, U.S.
- Genres: Instrumental rock; surf rock
- Occupation: Musician
- Instruments: Guitar; bass
- Years active: 1958–2009
- Formerly of: The Ventures

Robert Lenard "Bob" Bogle (January 16, 1934 – June 14, 2009) was an American musician who was a founding member of the instrumental rock band the Ventures. He and Don Wilson founded the group in 1958. Bogle was the lead guitarist and later bassist of the group. In 2008, Bogle and other members of the Ventures were inducted into the Rock and Roll Hall of Fame in the Performer category.

== Biography ==
Born near Wagoner, Oklahoma, Bogle worked as a bricklayer in California from the age of 15. A self-taught guitar player, Bogle met Don Wilson in Seattle in 1958, where they worked together on various construction sites. They went on to form a band, the Versatones, which evolved into the Ventures. Bogle's lead guitar on the band's 1960 cover of "Walk, Don't Run" helped to influence the next generation of guitarists including John Fogerty, Steve Miller, Joe Walsh and Stevie Ray Vaughan. Bogle's use of the vibrato arm was particularly notable, as it was also with their second single, "Perfidia".

The Ventures' song "Wild Child" was sampled by the Wiseguys on "Start the Commotion", giving Bogle his only hit writing credit on the British charts, reaching number 47 and spending 2 weeks on the chart.

Bogle died at age 75 on June 14, 2009, from non-Hodgkin lymphoma in Vancouver, Washington.
