= Redbone discography =

Band discography

- Studio albums: 8
- Live albums: 1
- Compilation albums: 9
- Singles: 21

The following is the discography of the Native American/Mexican American rock band Redbone.

== Studio albums ==
| Year | Album | Album details | Peak chart positions | | |
| Year | Album | Album details | US | CAN | NOR |
|---|---|---|---|---|---|
| 1970 | Redbone | Released: January 1970 • July 1970 (UK); Label: Epic | — | — | — |
| 1970 | Potlatch | Released: October 1970; Label: Epic | 99 | — | — |
| 1971 | Message from a Drum | Released: December 1971; Label: Epic | 75 | — | 25 |
| 1972 | Already Here | Released: September 1972; Label: Epic | — | — | — |
| 1973 | Wovoka | Released: November 1973; Label: Epic | 66 | 87 | — |
| 1974 | Beaded Dreams Through Turquoise Eyes | Released: October 1974; Label: Epic | 174 | — | — |
| 1977 | Cycles | Released: 1977; Label: RCA | — | — | — |
| 2005 | Peace Pipe | Released: 2005, as One World; Label: Alter-Native; Re-released: 2009; retitled Peace Pipe; Label: Bassline | — | — | — |
"—" denotes a recording that did not chart or was not released in that territory.

== Live album ==
- Redbone Live (recorded 1977; released 1994) as Avenue/Rhino 71632

== Compilation albums ==
- Come and Get Your Redbone: The Best of Redbone (1975) as Epic PG-33456 [2LP]; reissued on CD in 2014 as Floating World FLOAT-6221
- The Best of Redbone (1976) as Dominion/K-Tel 833 [note: re-recordings of their classic songs]
- The Very Best of Redbone (1991) as Epic/Sony Music Distribution 4679362 [UK import]; reissued in 2019 as Music On CD MOC-13719
- Greatest Songs (Come and Get Your Love) (1995) as Curb 77746
- Golden Classics (1996) as Collectables 5802 [note: this is a 2LP-on-1CD reissue of Potlatch and Message from a Drum plus two singles]
- To the Bone (1998) as Sony Music Special Products 28581
- Wet Willie and Redbone: Take 2 (2002) as Sony Music Special Products 52777 [five songs by each band]
- The Essential Redbone (2003) as Epic/Legacy 86072
- It's Your World: Redbone's Greatest Hits (2009)
- Redbone: A's & B's (2023) as Beat Goes On BGOCD-1488 [UK import]

== Singles ==
| Year | Name | Peak chart positions | | | | | | | | | | | | | Certification | Album |
| Year | Name | US | US B.U. | US R&B | AUT | BEL | CAN | FRA | NLD | NOR | GER | IRL | UK | NZL | Certification | Album |
|---|---|---|---|---|---|---|---|---|---|---|---|---|---|---|---|---|
| 1970 | "Little Girl" | — | — | — | — | — | — | — | — | — | — | — | — | — | | Redbone |
| 1970 | "Crazy Cajun Cakewalk Band" | — | — | — | — | — | — | — | — | — | — | — | — | — | | Redbone |
| 1970 | "Maggie" | 45 | N/A | — | — | 26 | 81 | — | 13 | — | 45 | — | — | — | | Potlatch |
| 1971 | "Chant: 13th Hour" | — | — | — | — | — | — | — | — | — | — | — | — | — | | Potlatch |
| 1971 | "Light as a Feather" | — | — | — | — | — | — | — | — | — | — | — | — | — | | Potlatch |
| 1971 | "The Witch Queen of New Orleans" | 21 | N/A | — | 14 | 1 | 15 | 23 | 5 | 6 | 13 | 7 | 2 | — | | Message from a Drum |
| 1972 | "Niji Trance" | — | — | — | — | — | — | — | — | — | — | — | — | — | | Message from a Drum |
| 1972 | "When You Got Trouble" | — (Note: "When You Got Trouble" did not enter the Billboard Hot 100, but peaked at number eleven on the Bubbling Under Hot 100 Singles chart, which ranks singles below the Billboard 100 that have not appeared on the latter chart.) | 11 | — | — | — | — | — | — | — | — | — | — | — | | Message from a Drum |
| 1972 | "Message from a Drum" | — | — | — | — | — | — | — | — | — | — | — | — | — | | Message from a Drum |
| 1972 | "Fais Do" | — | — | — | — | — | — | — | 6 | — | — | — | — | — | | Already Here |
| 1973 | "Poison Ivy" | — | — | — | — | — | — | — | 51 | — | — | — | — | — | | Already Here |
| 1973 | "We Were All Wounded at Wounded Knee" | — (Note: The song was banned from airplay on most American radio stations due to its controversial lyrics.) | — | — | — | 1 | — | — | 1 | — | 21 | — | — | — | | Wovoka (UK release only) |
| 1973 | "Come and Get Your Love" | 5 | N/A | 75 | — | — | 25 | — | 21 | — | — | — | — | — | RIAA: Gold; BPI: Platinum | Wovoka |
| 1974 | "Wovoka" | — (Note: "Wovoka" did not enter the Billboard Hot 100, but peaked at number one on the Bubbling Under Hot 100 Singles chart, which ranks singles below the Billboard 100 that have not appeared on the latter chart.) | 1 | — | — | 13 | — | — | 3 | — | — | — | — | — | | Wovoka |
| 1974 | "Suzie Girl" (Note: Released as Suzi Girl outside North America. The track also appeared under the name "Suzi Girl" on all releases of the album Beaded Dreams Through Turquoise Eyes.) | — (Note: "Suzie Girl"—released as "Suzi Girl" outside North America—did not enter the Billboard Hot 100, but peaked at number eight on the Bubbling Under Hot 100 Singles chart, which ranks singles below the Billboard 100 that have not appeared on the latter chart.) | 8 | — | — | — | — | — | — | — | — | — | — | 8 | | Beaded Dreams Through Turquoise Eyes |
| 1974 | "One More Time" | — | — | — | — | — | — | — | 21 | — | — | — | — | — | | Beaded Dreams Through Turquoise Eyes |
| 1975 | "Only You and Rock and Roll" | — | — | — | — | — | — | — | — | — | — | — | — | — | | Beaded Dreams Through Turquoise Eyes |
| 1975 | "I've Got to Find the Right Woman" | — | — | — | — | — | — | — | — | — | — | — | — | — | | non-album single (Note: The song was featured as a bonus track on the 2013 re-release of Beaded Dreams Through Turquoise Eyes.) |
| 1977 | "Give Our Love Another Try" | — | — | — | — | — | — | — | — | — | — | — | — | — | | Cycles |
| 1977 | "Checkin' It Out" | — | — | — | — | — | — | — | — | — | — | — | — | — | | Cycles |
| 2019 | "Come and Get Your Love" | — | — | — | — | 2 | — | 1 | — | — | — | — | — | — | | |
"—" denotes a recording that did not chart or was not released in that territory.

== Other appearances ==
- Guardians of the Galaxy: Awesome Mix Vol. 1 (Original Motion Picture Soundtrack) (2014) [features "Come and Get Your Love"]
