= The Very Best of Redbone =

Compilation album by Redbone
- Released: 1991
- Recorded: 1970–1974
- Length: 65:52
- Label: Epic
- Producer: Pat Vegas, Lolly Vegas and others

The Very Best of Redbone is one of several compilation albums by American band Redbone. It includes songs from their first six albums released from 1970 to 1974.

== Track listing ==
The Very Best of Redbone track listing
No.	Title	Writer(s)	Original album	Length
1.	"The Witch Queen of New Orleans"	Pat Vegas; Lolly Vegas	Message from a Drum	2:45
2.	"Come and Get Your Love"	Lolly Vegas	Wovoka	4:27
3.	"Wovoka"	Pat Vegas; Lolly Vegas	Wovoka	3:00
4.	"Niki Hokey"	Pat Vegas; Lolly Vegas; Jim Ford	Redbone	3:17
5.	"The Sun Never Shines on the Lonely"	Lolly Vegas	Message from a Drum	2:35
6.	"Niji Trance"	R. A. Bellamy; Pat Vegas; Lolly Vegas	Message from a Drum	3:27
7.	"Fais-Do"	Lolly Vegas; Pat Vegas	Already Here	2:36
8.	"Maggie"	Lolly Vegas	Potlatch	5:06
9.	"Poison Ivy"	Jerry Leiber; Mike Stoller	Already Here	3:00
10.	"Only You and Rock and Roll"	Pat Vegas; Lolly Vegas	Beaded Dreams Through Turquoise Eyes	2:58
11.	"We Were All Wounded at Wounded Knee"	Pat Vegas; Sandy Baron	Wovoka (UK release)	3:25
12.	"Chant: 13th Hour"	Pat Vegas	Potlatch	5:35
13.	"When You Got Trouble"	Pat Vegas; Lolly Vegas	Message from a Drum	3:24
14.	"Light as a Feather"	Pat Vegas	Potlatch	1:56
15.	"Suzi Girl"	Lolly Vegas	Beaded Dreams Through Turquoise Eyes	2:54
16.	"Power (Prelude to a Means)"	Pat Vegas	Already Here	4:26
17.	"Tennessee Girl"	Lolly Vegas	Redbone	2:27
18.	"Message from a Drum"	Pat Vegas	Message from a Drum	3:08
19.	"One More Time"	Lolly Vegas	Beaded Dreams Through Turquoise Eyes	2:52
20.	"Alcatraz"	Pat Vegas	Potlatch	2:47

== Personnel ==
- Lolly Vegas – guitars, vocals
- Pat Vegas – bass, vocals
- Tony Bellamy – guitars, vocals
- Peter DePoe – drums, percussion¤
- Arturo Perez – drums, percussion%
- Butch Rillera – drums, percussion+
