= Redbone Live =

Live album by Redbone
- Released: 1994
- Recorded: 1977
- Genres: Rock, funk
- Length: 44:09
- Label: Avenue Records/Rhino/Sony
- Producer: Jerry Goldstein

Redbone chronology
Cycles (1977)	Redbone Live (1994)	Peace Pipe (2005)

Professional ratings
Review scores
Source	Rating
AllMusic	3/5 stars

Redbone Live is a live album by American band Redbone. The album was recorded live on tour in 1977, while opening for War, Average White Band and Tower of Power.

== Track listing ==
Redbone Live track listing
No.	Title	Writer(s)	Original album	Length
1.	"Don't Say No"	Pat Vegas; Lolly Vegas	Cycles	4:48
2.	"Witch Queen of New Orleans"	P. Vegas; L. Vegas	Message from a Drum	3:41
3.	"Give Our Love Another Try"	P. Vegas; L. Vegas	Cycles	3:41
4.	"Maggie"	L. Vegas	Potlatch	9:09
5.	"Come and Get Your Love"	L. Vegas	Wovoka	6:11
6.	"Gamble (Take a Chance on Me)"	P. Vegas; L. Vegas	Cycles	4:21
7.	"Far Out Party at Gazzari's" (Instrumental)	P. Vegas; L. Vegas	Previously Unreleased	8:23

== Personnel ==
- Lolly Vegas - guitar, vocals (all tracks)
- Pat Vegas - bass guitar, vocals (all tracks)
- Aloisio Aguiar - keyboards (track 7)
- Eddie Summers - drums (track 7)

Additional personnel

- Gabriel Katona - keyboards, vocals (tracks 1 to 6)
- Jack White - drums (tracks 1 to 6)
- Plato T. Jones - percussion
