= Fais do-do =

Cajun dance party

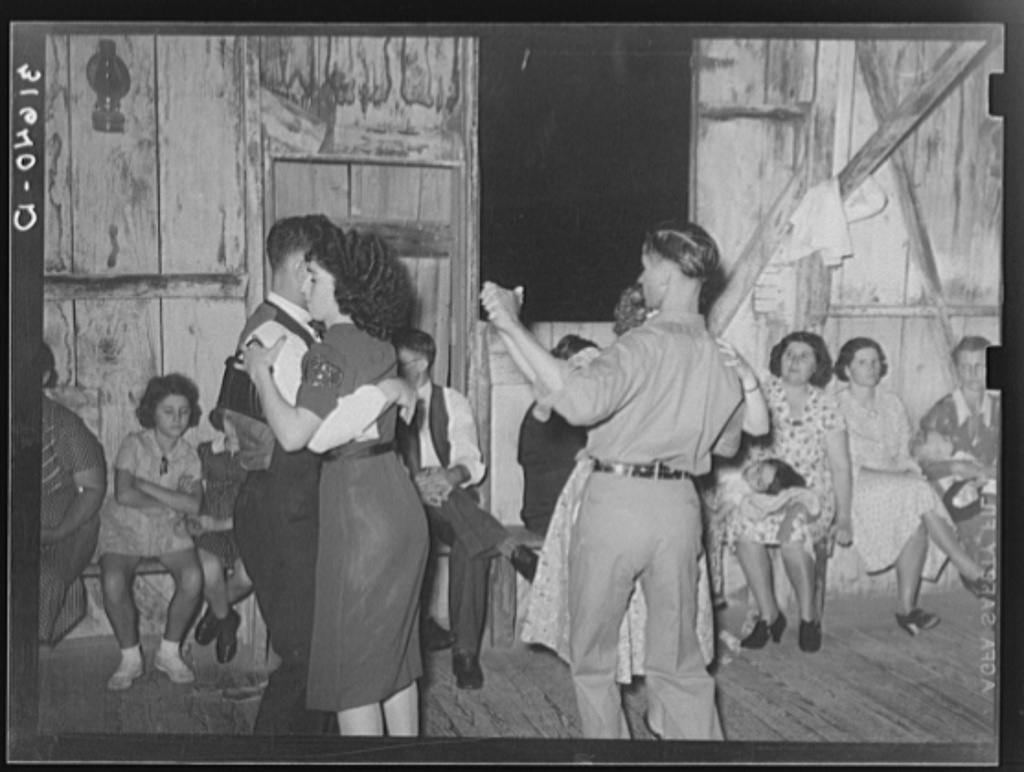
A fais do-do dance near Crowley, Louisiana in 1938

A fais do-do is a Cajun dance party; the term originated before World War II.

== History ==
"Do-do" itself is a hypocoristic shortening of the French verb dormir (to sleep), used primarily in speaking to small children. The phrase is embodied in an old French lullaby, a song sung to children when putting them down for the night.

Joshua Caffery, however, suggests the true derivation is more plausibly the dance call dos à dos (back to back), the do si do call of Anglo-American folk dance; and that sources such as Duhon are merely "repeating the same apocryphal explanation known by almost anyone who lives in Southern Louisiana."

Occurrences include the following:

- Dance temptation with back to back, or dos à dos from Louisiana French.
- In Aaron Neville's 1993 "Louisiana Christmas Day"
- A mention in Brenda Lee's 1958 song "Papa Noel", on the B-side of "Rockin' Around the Christmas Tree"
- In the lyrics of Bayou Jubilee, by The Nitty Gritty Dirt Band, on the album, Dream. "Nothing in this world, such a pure delight, as a fais-do-do on a Saturday night."
- In the lyrics of "Diggy Liggy Lo" song and lyrics written by Terry J. Clement.
- In the 1989 film J'ai Été Au Bal/I Went to the Dance by Les Blank, Chris Strachwitz, Maureen Gosling.
- In the 1944 film Dark Waters starring Merle Oberon.
- In the Landry series by V.C. Andrews
- In the lyrics of "Down at the Twist and Shout" by Mary Chapin Carpenter.
- In the title and lyrics of the song "Fais Do" by Redbone on the album: "Already Here"
- In the title and lyrics of the song "Fais Dodo" by Raffi on the album: One Light, One Sun (1985).
- Name of music venue and film location in Los Angeles (opened 1990).
- Song my Marcia Ball, "Christmas Fais do-do."
- Mention in the 2004 song, "Down in Thibodaux", by Chris Smither.
- Sung by Nondumiso Tembe in True Blood Season 4, Episode 9, "Let's Get Out of Here".

== See also ==
- Swamp pop
- Swamp blues
- Zydeco
- Cajun music
- Cajun
- Tejano music
