= Diamond Head (song) =

Single by the Ventures

from the album Walk, Don't Run, Vol. 2
- B-side: "Lonely Girl"
- Released: 1964
- Genre: Surf
- Length: 2:01
- Label: Dolton
- Composer: Danny Hamilton
- Producer: Dick Glasser

The Ventures singles chronology
| "Slaughter on Tenth Avenue" (1964) | "Diamond Head" (1964) | "Pedal Pusher" (1965) |

"Diamond Head" is an instrumental by the Ventures in Japan and Hong Kong. It also charted in the United States in both the Billboard and Cashbox charts. It was written by Dan Hamilton.

== Background ==
In addition to being recorded by the Ventures, it has also been covered by Aqua Velvets, and Susan and the Surftones. It was also covered with Japanese lyrics by Joō-sama as an OP for the anime adaptation of Kochira Katsushika-ku Kameari Kōen-mae Hashutsujo.

== Charts ==
For the week ending March 13, 1965, "Diamond Head" had moved up two notches from #4 to #2 in the Hong Kong Top Ten. The following week it had reached #1 there. The song became Japan's first million-seller and sold more than 1,850,000 copies there. It was a hit in Iran and got to #70 in the US.
