= Dan Hamilton (musician) =

American singer-songwriter (1946–1994)

- Born: Daniel Robert Hamilton; June 1, 1946; Spokane, Washington, United States
- Died: December 23, 1994 (aged 48) Los Angeles, California, United States
- Genres: Rock; surf music
- Occupations: Musician, bandleader, singer, songwriter
- Instruments: Guitar; vocals
- Labels: ABC Dunhill; Playboy

Daniel Robert Hamilton (June 1, 1946 – December 23, 1994) was an American musician and singer. He was a member of The T-Bones with his brother Judd Hamilton and later formed the soft-rock group Hamilton, Joe Frank & Reynolds, performing lead vocals on the band's two biggest hits, "Don't Pull Your Love" and "Fallin' in Love". He was also a composer who, in addition to co-writing "Fallin' in Love", was the sole songwriter for the Ventures hit song "Diamond Head".

== Background ==
Hamilton was a martial artist and reached the level of 3rd degree black belt.

== Early life ==
Dan Hamilton was born on June 1, 1946, in Spokane, Washington. He attended Eastmont High School in East Wenatchee, Washington. He was the younger brother of Judd Hamilton, who had been a road manager for The Ventures.

== Career ==
=== 1960s ===
As a singer, songwriter, and session musician, Hamilton began his music career at the age of 16 composing instrumentals for The Ventures.

In 1963 he joined The Avantis, a recording group produced by Judd Hamilton. The Avantis included Hamilton, Mexican-American brothers Pat and Lolly Vegas from Fresno, California, and drummer Mike Kowalski. The group became a support act for the Beach Boys. Later in 1963 the Vegas brothers changed their name back to Pat & Lolly Vegas and worked as the house band of LA's Haunted House Nightclub.

Hamilton composed several songs for The Ventures. The most notable of these is "Diamond Head", which the band recorded for their Walk, Don't Run, Vol. 2 album. "Diamond Head" became an international hit single for Hamilton and the Ventures. For the week ending March 13, 1965, "Diamond Head" moved up two notches from #4 to #2 in the Hong Kong Top Ten. The following week it reached #1 there. The song became Japan's first million-seller and sold more than 1,850,000 copies there. It was a hit in Iran and got to #70 in the US. The song was later covered by the Aqua Velvets and Susan & The Surftones. Hamilton wrote several other songs for the Ventures throughout the 1960s, such as "War of the Satellites", "Escape" (which was originally called "Target"), "Wild And Wooly", "Kandy Koncoction", and "The Gallop".

Two of his compositions - "Bullseye" and "No Exit" - were recorded by Mel Taylor and the Magics and appear on the In Action! album which was released in 1966.

In November 1965, he once again joined his brother Judd Hamilton to form the touring band The T-Bones. When The T-Bones disbanded in 1968, he along with Joe Frank Carollo and Tommy Reynolds, who had also become members of The T-Bones, rejoined to play clubs around Los Angeles as The Brothers.

=== 1970s ===
In 1970, Hamilton and Tommy Reynolds co-founded Hamilton Joe Frank & Reynolds when Joe Frank Carollo agreed to come back onboard. Soon after, they recorded their first million-selling gold record for the ABC Dunhill label with "Don't Pull Your Love", featuring Hamilton on lead vocals. In addition to serving as the group's guitarist and co-lead singer, Hamilton later became the main songwriter for the group. Along with Ann Hamilton, he co-composed the hit "Fallin' in Love" which reached #1 on the Billboard Hot 100 in 1975. It was later a hit for La Bouche in 1996, with their version reaching #35 on the Hot 100.

Between those two hit records, Hamilton had a 1972 solo release entitled "Don't Wait Up for Me Tonight", backed with "On the Other Hand", which was credited to Danny Hamilton & Spoondrift. It was released on Dunhill 4320. It also saw a release in New Zealand on Probe PROBE.44.

In Hamilton's final years, he and his brother were recording a country music album as The Hamilton Brothers.

== Death ==
Hamilton died on December 23, 1994, at the age of 48 of complications from Cushing's syndrome in Los Angeles, California.

== Later years ==
In 2012, Hamilton's widow Fredricka Hamilton successfully sued Henry Marx and his Music Force publishing co., and was awarded $562,317 in revenue from the song "Fallin' in Love".

== Discography ==
Solo releasesSingles
Act	Title	Release info	Year	Notes
Danny Hamilton & Spoondrift	"Don't Wait Up for Me Tonight" / "On the Other Hand",	Dunhill 4320	1972	
