= The Crazy Cajun =

The Crazy Cajun can refer to:

- Huey P. Meaux (1929–2011), American record producer, nicknamed The Crazy Cajun
  - Crazy Cajun Enterprises, cover company of recording studios including Capri Records owned by Huey P. Meaux
  - Crazy Cajun Records, recording studio and record label owned by Huey P. Meaux
- "Crazy Cajun Cakewalk Band", 1967 song by Redbone on Redbone (album)
- The Crazy Cajun Recordings, 1998 compilation album of Johnny Copeland music
