= Maniac (1980 film) =

1980 American horror film by William Lustig

- Theatrical release poster
- Directed by: William Lustig
- Screenplay by: C. A. Rosenberg; Joe Spinell
- Story by: Joe Spinell
- Produced by: Andrew W. Garroni; William Lustig
- Starring: Joe Spinell; Caroline Munro
- Cinematography: Robert Lindsay
- Edited by: Lorenzo Marinelli
- Music by: Jay Chattaway
- Production company: Magnum Motion Pictures Inc.
- Distributed by: Analysis Film Releasing Corporation
- Release dates: January 30, 1981 (New York City); March 6, 1981 (Los Angeles)
- Running time: 88 minutes
- Country: United States
- Language: English
- Budget: $350,000
- Box office: $4.5 million

Maniac is a 1980 American psychological slasher film directed by William Lustig and written by C. A. Rosenberg and Joe Spinell. It stars Spinell as Frank Zito, an Italian-American serial killer residing in New York City who murders and scalps young women.

With a minuscule budget, many scenes in the film were shot guerrilla style. Originally considered an exploitation film, Maniac has since attained a cult following despite receiving polarized reviews. The film was remade in 2012 by director Franck Khalfoun and produced by Alexandre Aja, starring Elijah Wood in the lead role.

While not prosecuted for obscenity nor officially listed as a video nasty, Maniac was seized by various police forces across Greater Manchester and Lancashire in England during the video nasty panic, presumably based on the film's notorious reputation overseas.

== Plot ==
Italian-American landlord Frank Zito was abused as a child by his prostitute mother Carmen, and as a result, becomes a serial killer who murders young women, scalps them and attaches their hair to mannequins. After he awakens from a nightmare about killing a couple on a beach, he dresses himself, revealing terrible scars on his torso, and leaves his apartment, heading towards Manhattan into Times Square. When Frank is randomly invited inside a hotel by a prostitute, she kisses him before he abruptly strangles and scalps her. He returns home, dresses a mannequin with the dead prostitute's clothing and nails her scalp to its head. Frank tells himself that beauty is a crime punishable by death.

Sometime later, he dresses again and takes a collection of weaponry with him, including a double-barrelled shotgun, before leaving. He drives around Brooklyn and the Queens area, where he finds a couple exiting a local disco and parking near the side of the Verrazzano Bridge. When the boyfriend starts up the vehicle after his date sees Frank spying on them, Frank kills the couple with his shotgun and then adds the woman to his mannequin collection. After seeing his recent crime on television, he talks to himself and the mannequins as he sobs himself to sleep.

During the next day in Central Park, Frank follows a photographer named Anna after she takes a photo of him and a little girl riding a bicycle in the distance. At night, Frank sees a nurse leaving the Roosevelt Hospital, where he then stalks her inside the subway station and murders her with a bayonet before adding her to his mannequin collection. Days later, Frank heads to Anna's apartment and is invited inside by Anna after she recognizes him from the photo she took of him. Upon him asking her out to dinner, he later shows her a photo of his mother who died in a car crash years ago. A few days later, Frank is invited by Anna to a studio during a photography session, and she introduces one of her models Rita to him. After seeing the two talking and holding hands, he steals Rita's necklace and leaves. Later that same night, he arrives at Rita's apartment to give her the necklace, before then attacking her and tying her to the bed. Frank begins talking and addresses her as his mother and stabs her with a switchblade before scalping her for his collection.

One night, Frank takes Anna on a date and they stop by a cemetery to visit his mother's grave. While laying some flowers beside the headstone, Frank begins to mourn over his mother as well as Rita and attacks Anna. He chases her around the cemetery, but she hits him in the arm with a shovel before fleeing. He hallucinates his decomposing mother attacking him from the grave. He runs back to his apartment, where he sees his mannequins suddenly coming alive. They mutilate Frank with his weapons before ultimately tearing off his head.

The next morning, two police officers break into Frank's apartment and see Frank lying dead on his bed, having committed suicide by stabbing himself. After the officers leave, Frank's eyes suddenly open, revealing he survived.

== Cast ==
- Joe Spinell as Frank Zito
- Caroline Munro as Anna D'Antoni
- Gail Lawrence as Rita
- Kelly Piper as Nurse
- Rita Montone as Hooker
- Tom Savini as Disco Boy
- Hyla Marrow as Disco Girl
- James Brewster as Beach Boy
- Linda Lee Walter as Beach Girl
- Tracie Evans as Street Hooker
- Sharon Mitchell as Nurse #2
- Carol Henry as Deadbeat
- Nelia Bacmeister as Carmen Zito
- Louis Jawitz as The Art Director
- Denise Spagnuolo as Denise
- Billy Spagnuolo as Billy
- Frank Pesce as TV Reporter (voice)
- William Lustig as Hotel Manager (uncredited)
- Andrew W. Garroni as Jerry (uncredited)

== Production ==
=== Development ===
Director William Lustig, who previously had worked as a director of pornographic films, was driving with Frank Pesce down the Eighth Avenue one night. Pesce asked Lustig if he could make a film similar to Jaws, but "on land". Lustig and co-writer Joe Spinell (whom he had met while working on The Seven-Ups) developed the script for an unreleased film named Slay Ride, about a father-son serial killer duo in New Jersey. They found that Slay Ride was "a much bigger film that [they] could raise money for", and decided to make a "smaller, more contained" film, titled Maniac. They came up with the idea of "[a] monster that was inside of [a] person, [who] had this insatiable appetite for killing that just kept driving him". The film's original script was to follow a cop chasing a serial killer in New York City, but this was changed to instead focus on the killer. Lustig felt that this decision "made for a much better movie" as it eliminated the "relief of going to a place of safety". Lustig used profits from his 1977 film Hot Honey to make the film, with co-producer Andrew W. Garroni and Spinell also contributing.

At the time, Screen Actors Guild contracts contained a clause that excluded X-rated films from union oversight. Lustig anticipated that Maniac would receive an X rating due to its gore effects, similar to Dawn of the Dead's initial rating, and submitted the script to SAG for review. When the initial submission was not rejected, Lustig submitted a revised script containing intentionally exaggerated, explicit depictions of violence and gore. SAG formally rejected this script, assuming that the final film would receive an X rating.

=== Casting ===
Because Maniac did not have the budget to secure a contract with SAG and the script was rejected, Lustig used a loophole to cast SAG actors, including Spinell, without exposing them to union penalties. Spinell wanted to play Frank Zito, and researched real-life serial killers such as Ted Bundy, John Wayne Gacy, Henry Lee Lucas, Ed Gein, and David Berkowitz to get into the role. He also saw a young child rocking by himself outside Lustig's apartment, which he incorporated into Frank's character, and came up with the idea that Frank would have scars from his abuse by his mother Carmen Zito. At one point during production, Spinell shaved his mustache and cut his hair to portray Lieutenant Munafo in Nighthawks. He wore a long-haired wig and fake mustache for the remaining scenes. Dario Argento's wife Daria Nicolodi was considered for the role of Anna D'Antoni, but was unavailable at the time since she was filming Inferno in Italy. Judd Hamilton provided the money to finish the film on the condition that his then-wife Caroline Munro be cast instead. Maniac was one of the three films that Spinell and Munro worked together; the other films being Starcrash and later The Last Horror Film. Munro's casting led to an increase in screentime for Anna, including particular scenes where she and Frank get to know each other and go on dates, which Lustig disliked. Several pornographic film actresses were hired to play Frank's victims and other minor female roles. Susan Tyrrell and Jason Miller were cast for the film, with Miller playing the cop from the film's original script, but they dropped out for unknown reasons.

Lustig played a hotel manager, during which Spinell kept trying to make him crack on camera by writing jokes on the check-in card. Frank Pesce provided the voice of a television reporter. Tom Savini and his real-life girlfriend Hyla Marrow made cameo appearances as the boyfriend and girlfriend killed by Frank. Louis Jawitz, who played Anna's art director, was actually a professional photographer who leased his studio to be used for one day to shoot the scene in which Frank visits Anna and three female models in the studio.

=== Filming ===
Principal photography began on October 21, 1979, and wrapped on January 18, 1980. The film was shot on location in New York City on a $48,000 budget in 26 days. Many scenes had to be filmed guerrilla-style because the production could not afford city permits. Lorenzo Marinelli was hired to edit the film. The opening scene on the beach was shot as a homage to Jaws. The exterior of the hotel in the scene where Frank is invited inside by a prostitute was filmed at the St. James Hotel, during which they were approached by police looking for a serial killer. Lustig stated that on the night after they were at the hotel, the crew read news that a woman had been decapitated there. Two other women had also been murdered in the Travel Inn Hotel in Times Square at the time, and police dressed up mannequins in the victims' clothes to identify them, similar to Frank dressing his mannequins with his victims' clothes and hair in the film.

Tom Savini was hired as the film's make-up artist while working on Friday the 13th, feeling upset that his work on the latter film was being cut. The sound effect for Frank ripping the prostitute's flesh when scalping her was created by twisting a leather wallet near a microphone. The scene where Frank murders the boyfriend (played by Savini) was filmed near the Verrazzano–Narrows Bridge in an hour, and loosely inspired by the "Son of Sam" murders committed by David Berkowitz, who shot people in parked cars with a .44 Special revolver. Savini received the role for the male victim from him having already made a cast of his own head, which was filled inside with leftover food, pig intestines, and fake blood. Since Savini used live ammunition for the scene, with the force of the blast making him fall off the car's hood, he immediately threw the shotgun into the trunk of a waiting car driven by Spinell's friend and assistant Luke Walter, to avoid being caught by the police. The part where Frank murders the female victim (played by Hyla Marrow) was filmed in a different location at a later date. The dummy was locked in the trunk of the car used in the scene. Because the car had begun to smell because of the pig intestines, it was then sunk to the bottom of the East River. The sound effect for the shotgun being fired was reused from Dawn of the Dead.

The scene with the helicopter POV shot was repurposed from an unused scene for Inferno. According to Lustig, Frank's apartment was designed by an unknown individual, who built an actual apartment with immovable walls and running water. Spinell and the designer furnished the apartment with props, dolls and mannequins. Savini also reused the headless corpse of Pamela Voorhees from Friday the 13th for the scene in which Frank is killed by his mannequins.

=== Soundtrack ===
Lustig considered hiring the Italian progressive rock band Goblin to compose the soundtrack for Maniac, as Dario Argento had used them for his horror films, but decided to use Jay Chattaway instead.

== Release ==
According to Variety report, Maniac was scheduled for a midnight screening at the Cannes Film Festival on May 10, 1980. The film had its U.S. premiere in New York City on January 30, 1981, followed by a Los Angeles premiere on March 6.

=== Censorship ===
Since the film was not submitted to the MPAA, the film was released unrated, with the designation "For adults only". Despite the poster stating "No one under 17 will be admitted", a severely-edited version of the film received an R-Rating in the South and was distributed in March 1981 in several other States such as California, of the unrated version shortly after its first U.S. domestic release in New York in January 1981.

The film was refused a classification by the British Board of Film Classification upon its original cinema release and was additionally banned for video in 1998, but was later passed at an 18 certificate in 2002 with 58 seconds of cuts. In 2022, the BBFC passed the film uncut with an 18 certificate.

In Australia, the film's promotional campaign featured a censored version of the theatrical poster image, which blacked out the scalp held in the killer's hand.

=== Home media ===
The film was originally released on Beta and VHS by Media Home Entertainment in 1981.

The film was released on DVD and VHS in North America by Anchor Bay Entertainment in 2001. Blue Underground re-released Maniac on Blu-ray on October 26, 2010.

=== Critical reception ===
==== Contemporaneous ====
Upon its theatrical release, Maniac received numerous unfavorable reviews, with many critics lambasting the film for its depiction of violence. Gene Siskel did a TV piece for the CBS affiliate in New York City where he strongly criticized the use of TV kiosks that showed graphically violent and gory scenes from the film outside a theatre in Times Square; he later picked the movie as one of his "Dogs of the Week" on his show with Roger Ebert, stating that he walked out of the movie after 20 minutes because he felt it could not redeem itself at that point.

Vincent Canby of The New York Times wrote: "Good sense, if not heaven, should protect anyone who thinks he likes horror films from wasting a price of admission on Maniac, a movie that shows how an aging, pot-bellied maniac slices up young women of no great intelligence".

==== Contemporary ====
On the review aggregator website Rotten Tomatoes, Maniac holds a 40% approval rating based on 20 critic reviews, with an average rating of 5.2/10.

Stuart Galbraith IV (DVD Talk) said of the film: "Despite some good direction and a sincere, even daring performance by character actor Joe Spinell (Rocky), who also co-produced and co-wrote its screenplay, Maniac (1980) is alternately repellent and boring, despite the obvious intelligence that went into its making. A low-budget slasher film notable for its extremely graphic splatter effects by Tom Savini - who also appears in the picture - Maniac is mostly a character study, anticipating the much superior (if no less unpleasant) Henry: Portrait of a Serial Killer (1986)".

Tom Becker of DVD Verdict said "that the film is so effective is due in no small part to the performance of Joe Spinell as Frank, the schlubby-looking guy whose darkness overwhelms him. This is not the standard, amateurish, paint-by-numbers horror villain turn. Spinell creates a fully formed portrait of this monster that goes far beyond the surface. He mutters to himself, talks to mannequins, growls like an animal when stalking his prey—yet he can be charming as well, and while the pairing of Spinell and Munro as lovers has a definite Beauty and the Beast quality to it, it's not entirely unbelievable. Had Maniac been more of a mainstream film, Spinell might have been remembered as one of the great horror heavies".

The Hollywood Reporter cites the film as "something of a grubby touchstone among genre fans".

Film scholar John Kenneth Muir wrote that the film "positively oozes sleaze and despair, and that's a compliment...After watching Maniac, you'll want to take a deep breath, maybe even a shower, but you won't have wasted ninety minutes on something that has no meaning, no pulse, and no heart". Jim Harper, in his book Legacy of Blood: A Comprehensive Guide to Slasher Movies, praised Spinnell's performance, noting it as the "centerpiece" of the film.

== Legacy ==
Maniac has been cited by some media outlets as one of the greatest slasher/horror films ever made. Esquire placed it at #18 in their list of "The 55 Scariest Movies of All Time". It was ranked at #44 in Paste magazine's "50 Best Slasher Movies of All Time".

The film is discussed, in contrast with Christo and Jeanne-Claude's artwork Surrounded Islands, in David Antin's poem what it means to be avant-garde.

=== Novelizations ===
Around the time of the film's release, Richard Vetere was hired by Lustig to write a novelization, but the novel went unpublished as Vetere found the film "gross". In March 2025, another novelization was published by Editions Faute de frappe, written by Stéphane Bourgoin.

=== Maniac 2: Mr. Robbie ===
A horror short promotional film, entitled Maniac 2: Mr. Robbie, was shot in 1986 by Joe Spinell and director Buddy Giovinazzo as a remake of the 1973 film The Psychopath. The short's story follows a psychopathic children's television show host who murders abusive parents. It was made to raise financing for a sequel to Maniac, as Spinell was upset that the film faced accusations of misogyny by women's groups. The feature-length version of the film was never shot after Spinell died in 1989.

The short film was included with the 30th anniversary edition release of Maniac.

=== Remake ===
Lustig planned a remake. During the 2009 edition of the New York Horror Film Festival, while receiving a Lifetime Achievement Award, Lustig announced that the deal for a remake has been sealed. During a Q&A session at the Sunshine Cinema in New York City in November 2010, Lustig announced that the remake rights had been acquired by a French production company with Alexandre Aja attached. He also stated that he would love to see Tom Sizemore take over the Frank Zito role, as he felt that Sizemore was a lot like Spinell, and that he had recommended as much to the French production company.

Elijah Wood was cast as Frank Zito and the plan was to begin filming later in the year. Aja produced the film and Franck Khalfoun was signed on to direct the remake. America Olivo and Morgane Slemp were cast, alongside Nora Arnezeder and Genevieve Alexandra.

Arnezeder discussed of the remake using POV shots and Elijah Wood's character as half-angel/half-devil. Arnezeder described her role in the film as an artist who develops a friendship with Wood's character. She declined to reveal more, but hinted at a different take on the original. She said she was drawn to the concept of the film as a psychological horror, stating it would not be that interesting if the movie was just blood and screams. The film finished shooting in Los Angeles in December 2011 and was released in 2012.

=== Comic ===
In 2017, Eibon Press published a 3-issue comic adaptation of the film, written by Stephen Romano and illustrated by Pat Carbajal.

== Accolades ==
Maniac was nominated for a Saturn Award by the Academy of Science Fiction, Fantasy and Horror Films, USA, for Best Low-Budget Film in 1981.

== Works cited ==
- Edwards, Matthew (2017). Twisted Visions: Interviews with Cult Horror Filmmakers. McFarland. ISBN 978-1-476-62814-1. OCLC 959535405.
- Harper, Jim (May 2004). Legacy of Blood: A Comprehensive Guide to Slasher Movies. United Kingdom: Critical Vision. ISBN 978-1-900-48639-2. OCLC 475680187.
- Muir, John Kenneth (2012). Horror Films of the 1980s. Vol. 1. Jefferson, N.C.: McFarland. ISBN 978-0-786-47298-7. OCLC 840902442.
- Schoell, William (1985). Stay Out of the Shower: 25 Years of Shocker Films, Beginning With Psycho. Dembner Books. ISBN 978-0-934-87861-6. OCLC 804523898.
