= The Avantis =

Former Californian surf musical group

Background information
- Origin: Los Angeles, California, United States
- Genres: Surf
- Years active: 1963 - 1964
- Labels: Astra; Chancellor; Regency; Sundazed
- Past members: Pat Vegas; Lolly Vegas; Danny Hamilton; Mike Kowalski; Judd Hamilton

The Avantis were a surf group from Los Angeles, California, that was active from around 1963 to 1964. They recorded some singles on a couple of labels. They are known for their 1963 surf rock instrumental, "Wax 'Em Down".

== Background ==
The group was made up of Mexican-Americans, Pat and Lolly Vegas who led the band. The group challenged the norm as the brothers Pat and Lolly were of Native American as well as Mexican heritage. The brothers came from Fresno, California. Their drummer was Mike Kowalski. The line up also included guitarist Danny Hamilton. They were also a support act for the Beach Boys. Later in 1963 they changed their name, and were going by the name of Pat & Lolly Vegas, and were the house band of The Haunted House Nightclub in LA. During their time, they worked closely with Judd Hamilton (Older brother of Dan Hamilton) who was the arranger and co-composer on their records. For a period of time, Judd Hamilton was also in the group.

According to Walk-Don't Run: The Story of the Ventures by Del Halterman, the group was assembled by Judd Hamilton who took Pat and Lolly Vegas and added his brother Danny and drummer Danny Leeds to form the group. However the notes by Pat Vegas on the sleeve of the 2014 Sundazed release of "Gypsy Surfer" / "Wax 'Em Down" state that the line up was Pat Vegas, Lolly Vegas, Danny Hamilton and Mike Kowalski.

An article about the group also appears in the Pipeline magazine in its Summer 2008 issue.

== Info on releases ==
=== "Wax 'Em Down" ===
In September 1963, "Wax 'Em Down" b/w "Gypsy Surfer" was released on Chancellor 1144. Both sides were written by Pat Vegas, also with Judd Hamilton handling the arrangements for both sides. The single was their debut on the Chancellor label in 1963. Music magazine, Cashbox in its September 28 issue, gave it a favorable review with a B+ Rating, saying that the Avantis were a pro-sounding group and the track was first rate surfin’ stuff. It became a minor hit for the group that year. The single was distributed in Canada by Sparton of Canada Ltd. It also got into the C-FUNTASTIC FIFTY chart in Canada. On October 12, 1963, the chart recorded the single's status as having moved up one notch from 37 to 36, sitting right behind "Fools Rush In" by Rick Nelson. The record also ended up being bootlegged on an infamous label called Astra.

"Wax "Em Down" in later years

Some decades after the record was recorded, an acetate demo of "Wax 'Em Down" caused a bit of a stir when it ended up at the Ventures fan club in the UK. Being only partially labeled, rumors were going around the club that it was an unreleased Ventures recording. The truth was realized when a labeled copy of the Avantis 45 came to light.

In a review of Rock Instrumentals Volumes 1-10, Reverb Central/Phil Dirt referred to the song as "a dry guitar chamber reverbed adventure in the surf culture". With the B-side he said that "it was a chilling track with the organ break being different from the other discs of the day".

"Wax 'Em Down" appears on the 2014 VA comp, Long-Lost Honkers & Twangers Ace CDLUX-013, which also includes The Impacts, The Exports, The Swanks, and Johnny & The Hurricanes.

=== Other songs ===
"Surfin' Granny" b/w "Do The Surfin' Granny" was released on Regency RP-107. The A side was written by Danny Whitten, Judd Hamilton and Pat Vegas, with the B side by Danny Hamilton and Pat Vegas. Judd Hamilton arranged both sides. Later in 1964 "Phantom Surfer" (Regency 110) was released. The recording "Phantom Surfer" featured some extra studio musicians, David Gates on guitar and Leon Russell playing Hammond organ.

== Later years ==
Some time after they ceased performing as The Avantis, they released Hotrodders' Choice (as The Deuce Coupes) on the Del-Fi label. Later they would go on to form Redbone. In 1970, Dan Hamilton along with Tommy Reynolds and Joe Frank Carollo, co-founded Hamilton Joe Frank & Reynolds. They had a million dollar smash hit with "Don't Pull Your Love".

Dan Hamilton died on December 23, 1994, at the age of 48. Lolly Vegas died of cancer on March 4, 2010, in Reseda, California. He was 70 years of age.

== Discography ==
Singles
| Title | Label and cat | Year | Notes # |
|---|---|---|---|
| "Wax 'Em Down" / "Gypsy Surfer" | Chancellor C-1144 | 1963 | |
| "Surfin' Granny" / "Do The Surfin' Granny" | Regency RP-107 | 1964 | |
| "Phantom Surfer" / "Lucille" | Regency 110 | 1964 | |
| Wax 'Em Down / "Gypsy Surfer" | Astra A-1006 | 1965 | |
| "Gypsy Surfer" / "Wax 'Em Down" | Sundazed S-287 | 2014 | |

EPs
| Title | Tracks | Label and cat | Year | Notes # |
|---|---|---|---|---|
| "For Gremmies Only" 1st 60s Surf E.P. | Side A. * The Teenbeats - "Mr. Moto", "Surf Bound" * The Vaqueros - "Echo"; Side B. * The Gamblers - "LSD-25", "Moon Dawg! * The Avantis - "Gypsy Surfer". | Moxie M-1029 | 1980 | |

=== Compilation albums ===
"Wax 'Em Down" appears on ...
| Artists | Title | Label and cat | Year | F | Notes # |
|---|---|---|---|---|---|
| Terry Lee | The Best Of The TL Sounds | Astra Recording Co. ALP-1000 | 1966 | LP | |
| Various artists | Surfin' U.S.A. Vol. 2 | Surfville Records 1003 | | LP | |
| Various Artists | Wax 'Em Down! | Revell Records RR-1001 | | LP | |
| Various artists | Surf-Age Nuggets: Trash & Twang Instrumentals 1959-66 | RockBeat Records ROC-CD-3098 | 2012 | CD | |
| Various artists | Long-Lost Honkers & Twangers | Ace Records CDLUX-013 | 2014 | CD | |

"Gypsy Surfer" appears on ...
| Artist | Title | Label and cat | Year | F | Notes # |
|---|---|---|---|---|---|
| Various artists | Surfin' U.S.A. Vol. 2 | Surfville Records 1003 | | LP | |
| Various artists | Guitar Player Presents...Legends of Guitar: Surf, Vol. 1 | Rhino Entertainment R2-70724 | 1991 | CD | |
| Various artists | The Birth of Surf | Ace Records CDCHD-1155 | 2007 | CD | |

"Phantom Surfer" appears on ...
| Artist | Title | Label and cat | Year | F | Notes # |
|---|---|---|---|---|---|
| Various Artists | Wax 'Em Down! | Revell Records RR-1001 | | LP | |
