= Rap City (disambiguation) =

Rap City is an American music video television program shown on BET.

Rap City may also refer to:

- RapCity (1995–present), also Rap City, a Canadian music video television program shown on MuchMusic
- "Rap City", a 1964 song by The Ventures from the album Walk, Don't Run, Vol. 2
