= Beaded Dreams Through Turquoise Eyes =

Studio album by Redbone
- Released: October 1974
- Length: 31:56
- Label: Epic
- Producer: Pat Vegas and Lolly Vegas

Redbone chronology
Wovoka (1973)	Beaded Dreams Through Turquoise Eyes (1974)	Cycles (1977)

Professional ratings
Review scores
Source	Rating
Allmusic	2/5 stars

Beaded Dreams Through Turquoise Eyes is the sixth studio album by the Mexican American/Native American funk rock band Redbone. It was released on Epic Records In October 1974, and was met with mixed reviews. It was co-produced by the brothers Pat Vegas (bass,"roto"-bass, vocals) and Lolly Vegas (lead guitar, vocals). It contains five songs on each side, and six extra tracks when it was re-released on CD in 2013. The record charted on the US Billboard 200 in 1974, peaking at number 174. The record is just over a half hour long. All four members of the band contributed to vocals, and an additional three backing vocalists were recruited for this project. Several members contributed to various percussion, and three additional personnel members were recruited for string arrangements.

== Track listing ==
Side one
No.	Title	Writer(s)	Length
1.	"One More Time"	Lolly Vegas	2:52
2.	"Suzi Girl"	L. Vegas	2:54
3.	"Only You and Rock and Roll"	Patrick Vegas; L. Vegas	2:58
4.	"Blood Sweat and Tears"	P. Vegas	2:48
5.	"Cookin' with D'Redbone"	L. Vegas	3:05

Side two
No.	Title	Writer(s)	Length
6.	"(Beaded Dreams Through) Turquoise Eyes"	P. Vegas	3:07
7.	"Beautiful Illusion"	L. Vegas	3:47
8.	"Interstate Highway 101"	P. Vegas	2:54
9.	"I'll Never Stop Loving You"	P. Vegas; L. Vegas	2:46
10.	"Moon When Four Eclipse"	L. Vegas	4:45

2013 CD reissue bonus tracks (Wounded Bird Records – WOU 3053)
No.	Title	Writer(s)	Length
11.	"I've Got to Find the Right Woman"	L. Vegas	3:13
12.	"Physical Attraction"	P. Vegas	2:57
13.	"Keep Me Uptight"	P. Vegas; L. Vegas	6:06
14.	"To Get the Love I Need"	P. Vegas; L. Vegas	2:59
15.	"A Little Bitty Ditty"	P. Vegas; L. Vegas	2:57
16.	"Echoes from Another Planet"	P. Vegas	3:39

The bonus tracks on the 2013 CD reissue were originally planned for a scrapped album that was due to be released in 1975. The album only got as far as a test pressing and was never commercially released. "I've Got to Find the Right Woman" was released as a single in 1975 with "Physical Attraction" on the b-side.

== Charts ==
Chart (1974)	Peak position
US Billboard 200	174

== Personnel ==
- Lolly Vegas – lead guitar, lead vocals
- Tony Bellamy – rhythm guitar, congas, background vocals
- Pat Vegas – Fender bass, "Roto-bass", lead vocals
- Butch Rillera – drums, percussion, background vocals

=== Additional personnel ===
- Bonnie Bramlett – backing vocals
- Merry Clayton – backing vocals
- Clydie King – backing vocals
- Gene Page – string arrangements
- Dave Blumberg – string arrangements
