= Message from a Drum =

Studio album by Redbone
- Released: December 1971
- Length: 34:37
- Label: Epic
- Producer: Pat Vegas and Lolly Vegas

Redbone chronology
Potlatch (1970)	Message from a Drum (1971)	Already Here (1972)

Alternative covers
- Cover of the European release, The Witch Queen of New Orleans

Singles from Message from a Drum
- 1. "The Witch Queen of New Orleans" Released: May 17, 1971; 2. "Niji Trance" Released: April 28, 1972; 3. "When You Got Trouble" Released: March 2, 1972; 4. "Message from a Drum" Released: May 2, 1972

Professional ratings
Review scores
Source	Rating
Allmusic	link

Message from a Drum is the third album by Native American rock band Redbone released in 1971. It was released in Europe under the name The Witch Queen of New Orleans with the same track list and a different cover. The CD version released in the early 2000s has the European cover and title of the original LP and includes the single version of "Chant: 13th Hour" as a bonus track (the full version being from the second LP Potlatch).

== Track listing ==
All tracks written by Lolly Vegas unless otherwise specified. Tony Bellamy is credited as "R. A. Bellamy" on original LP sticker.

Side One
No.	Title	Writer(s)	Length
1.	"Message from a Drum"	Pat Vegas	3:08
2.	"Niji Trance"	Tony Bellamy, P. Vegas, L. Vegas	3:27
3.	"The Sun Never Shines on the Lonely"		2:35
4.	"Maxsplivitz"		0:18
5.	"Emotions"		4:10
6.	"Jerico"	P. Vegas, L. Vegas	3:47

Side Two
No.	Title	Writer(s)	Length
7.	"The Witch Queen of New Orleans"	P. Vegas, L. Vegas	2:45
8.	"When You Got Trouble"	P. Vegas, L. Vegas	3:24
9.	"Perico"		0:18
10.	"Fate"		6:36
11.	"One Monkey"		4:09
Total length:			34:37

Bonus track (2004 Repertoire Records CD reissue – RES 2318)
No.	Title	Writer(s)	Length
12.	"Chant: 13th Hour" (Single version)	P. Vegas	3:02
Total length:			37:39

== Personnel ==
- Lolly Vegas – lead guitar, organ, acoustic guitar, vocals
- Tony Bellamy – rhythm guitar, Wah-Wah, dobro, vocals
- Pat Vegas – bass, acoustic guitar, electric guitar, piano, vocals
- Peter DePoe – drums, percussion, vocals

== Charts ==
Chart (1972)	Peak position
Norwegian Albums (VG-lista)	25
US Billboard 200	75
