= Already Here =

Studio album by Redbone
- Released: 1972
- Length: 34:01
- Label: Epic
- Producer: Pat Vegas, Lolly Vegas, Alex Kazanegras

Redbone chronology
Message from a Drum (1971)	Already Here (1972)	Wovoka (1973)

Singles from Already Here
- 1. "Fais Do" / "Already Here (Brujo)" Released: 1972; 2. "Poison Ivy" / "Condition Your Condition" Released: 1973

Professional ratings
Review scores
Source	Rating
Allmusic	2/5 stars

Already Here is the fourth album by Native American/Mexican American band Redbone.

== Track listing ==
Side One
No.	Title	Writer(s)	Length
1.	"Fais-Do"	Lolly Vegas, Pat Vegas	2:36
2.	"Motivation"	Tony Bellamy, L. Vegas, P. Vegas	2:13
3.	"Power (Prelude To A Means)"	P. Vegas	4:29
4.	"Speakeasy"	L. Vegas	3:50
5.	"Condition Your Condition"	T. Bellamy, L. Vegas, P. Vegas	2:51

Side Two
No.	Title	Writer(s)	Length
6.	"Where Is Your Heart"	L. Vegas	3:05
7.	"Good Enough For Jesus"	P. Vegas	2:36
8.	"Poison Ivy"	Jerry Leiber, Mike Stoller	3:00
9.	"Already Here (Brujo)"	L. Vegas	9:21
Total length:			34:01

Wounded Bird Records CD bonus tracks – WOU 1598
No.	Title	Writer(s)	Length
10.	"We Were All Wounded at Wounded Knee"	P. Vegas, Sandy Baron	3:29
11.	"Speakeasy" (Single version)	L. Vegas	3:42
12.	"Already Here (Brujo)" (Single version)	L. Vegas	3:40
Total length:			44:52

== Personnel ==
- Lolly Vegas – lead guitar, vocals
- Tony Bellamy – rhythm guitar, vocals
- Pat Vegas – bass, vocals
- Arturo Perez – drums, percussion

=== Additional personnel ===
- Terry Furlong – slide guitar on "Fais-Do"
- Chipper Lavergne – percussion on "Fais-Do"
- Ronnie Baron – percussion on "Fais-Do"
- Elijah Horn Section – brass on "Motivation"
- Peter DePoe – drums on "Power"
- Gene Page – string arrangement on "Power" and "Where Is Your Heart"
- Red Rhodes – steel guitar on "Speakeasy"
- Gordon DeWitty – piano on "Speakeasy"
- David Oliver – background vocals on "Condition Your Condition"
- Michael Freda – background vocals on "Condition Your Condition"
