= Redbone (album) =

Studio album by Redbone
- Released: January 1970
- Length: 73:23
- Label: Epic
- Producer: Lolly Vegas, Pete Welding

Redbone chronology
Redbone (1970)	Potlatch (1970)

Singles from Redbone
- 1. "Little Girl" / "Crazy Cajun Cakewalk Band" Released: 1970; 2. "Crazy Cajun Cakewalk Band" / "Night Come Down" Released: 1970

Professional ratings
Review scores
Source	Rating
AllMusic	4/5 stars
Christgau's Record Guide	C
Rolling Stone	(favorable)

Redbone is the debut studio album by Native American rock band Redbone. In Europe it was also released as a single record. The double album contains 4 instrumentals, 3 of which are extended.

The album contains their version of the 1967 hit they wrote for P.J. Proby, "Niki Hoeky". The track appears on the album as "Niki Hokey".

== Track listing ==
=== Original double album track list ===
- Epic EGP 501 (United States/Canada)
- Epic BN 26 526 / 26 527 (France)
- Epic EPC 67242 (Netherlands)
- Wounded Bird Records WOU 501 (2006 U.S. CD reissue)

Side one
No.	Title	Writer(s)	Length
1.	"Crazy Cajun Cakewalk Band"	Lolly Vegas; Patrick Vegas; Jim Ford	3:06
2.	"Prehistoric Rhythm"	L. Vegas	3:50
3.	"Niki Hokey"	L. Vegas; P. Vegas; J. Ford	3:17
4.	"Promise I Won't Let It Show"	P. Vegas	3:06
5.	"Minor Seven Heaven"	L. Vegas	4:17

Side two
No.	Title	Writer(s)	Length
6.	"Night Come Down"	L. Vegas	3:53
7.	"Tennessee Girl"	L. Vegas	2:27
8.	"Rebecca"	L. Vegas	3:02
9.	"Jambone" (Instrumental)	P. Vegas; L. Vegas; R. Anthony Bellamy; Peter DePoe	7:50

Side three
No.	Title	Writer(s)	Length
10.	"Little Girl"	L. Vegas	3:54
11.	"Chance to See"	P. Vegas	4:33
12.	"Red and Blue"	L. Vegas	2:41
13.	"Suite Mode" (Instrumental)	P. Vegas; L. Vegas; R. A. Bellamy; P. DePoe	8:17

Side four
No.	Title	Writer(s)	Length
14.	"(I Can't) Handle It"	L. Vegas	5:35
15.	"I'm a Man" (Instrumental)	L. Vegas	2:57
16.	"Danse Calinda"	P. Vegas	2:41
17.	"Things Go Better..." (Instrumental)	P. Vegas; L. Vegas; R. A. Bellamy; P. DePoe	7:40

U.K. 2016 CD reissue (Repertoire Records REPUK 1295)
No.	Title	Writer(s)	Length
18.	"Crazy Cajun Cakewalk Band" (Single version – Stereo)	L. Vegas; P. Vegas; J. Ford	2:41
19.	"Crazy Cajun Cakewalk Band" (Single version – Mono)	L. Vegas; P. Vegas; J. Ford	2:41

=== Single album track list ===
- CBS 64069 (United Kingdom)
- Epic BN 26280 (Netherlands)

Side one
No.	Title	Writer(s)	Length
1.	"Prehistoric Rhythm"	L. Vegas	3:50
2.	"Crazy Cajun Cakewalk Band"	L. Vegas; P. Vegas; J. Ford	3:06
3.	"Niki Hokey"	L. Vegas; P. Vegas; J. Ford	3:17
4.	"Minor Seven Heaven"	L. Vegas	4:17
5.	"Things Go Better..." (Instrumental)	P. Vegas; L. Vegas; R. A. Bellamy; P. DePoe	7:40

Side two
No.	Title	Writer(s)	Length
6.	"Night Come Down"	L. Vegas	3:53
7.	"Tennessee Girl"	L. Vegas	2:27
8.	"Jambone" (Instrumental)	P. Vegas; L. Vegas; R. Anthony Bellamy; Peter DePoe	7:50
9.	"Rebecca"	L. Vegas	3:02
10.	"Danse Calinda"	P. Vegas	2:41
11.	"Red and Blue"	L. Vegas	2:41

== Personnel ==
- Lolly Vegas – lead guitar, vocals
- Tony Bellamy – rhythm guitar, vocals
- Pat Vegas – bass, vocals
- Pete DePoe – drums, percussion
