= Surfmania =

Studio album by the Aqua Velvets
- Released: 1995
- Genre: Surf rock
- Labels: Mesa; Atlantic
- Producer: Michael Lindner

The Aqua Velvets chronology
The Aqua Velvets (1992)	Surfmania (1995)	Nomad (1996)

Surfmania is the second album by the American band the Aqua Velvets, released in 1995. The band supported the album with a North American tour.

== Production ==
The album was recorded at the home studio of bass player Michael Lindner. It was produced by Lindner, who aimed for a smoother instrumental sound. Many of the tracks were inspired by the band's love of garage rock and lounge music.

== Critical reception ==
Professional ratings
Review scores
Source	Rating
AllMusic	4/5 stars
MusicHound Rock: The Essential Album Guide	4/5 stars
Oakland Tribune	2.5/4 stars
Orange County Register	3/5 stars

Trouser Press thought that "the faux Latin of 'Mexican Rooftop Afternoon', the faux Polynesia of 'Martin Denny, Esq.' and the faux noir of 'Raymond Chandler Evening' continue the winning combination of hot licks and cool irony." Guitar Player wrote that "engaging melodies draw the listener into the Velvets' domain, where the music's buoyant and highly visual nature immediately begins to satiate any hodad cravings for vocal cues." The Richmond Times-Dispatch described the album as "soaked with reverb, slinky guitars, ocean deep-bass and great drum work."

Miami New Times opined that "this is from the more mannered, winking school of retro-surf music, with some nods to the equally mannered school of cocktail-jazz revivalism." The Boston Herald noted that the band "cannily put the 'wet' surf sound of reverb-drenched Fender guitars to diverse uses, including tributes to Led Zeppelin, mystery writer Raymond Chandler and the exotic kitsch of Martin Denny."

AllMusic wrote that the album "finds a timewarped niche in the guitar-rock culture that's right up alongside the master himself, Dick Dale, and the 12 cuts herein find the band members racing through all the intersections on the surf guitar highway, whether it's nodding to Mancini's 'Peter Gunn' theme or shaking a finger in the twitchy vibrato of every fast-gun surf-twang number you've ever heard."

== Track listing ==
No.	Title	Length
1.	"Surfmania"	2:58
2.	"Mexican Rooftop Afternoon"	3:45
3.	"Martini Time"	4:22
4.	"Zamora"	4:12
5.	"Mastering the Art of Falling Down"	3:11
6.	"Martin Denny, Esq."	4:32
7.	"Surf Samba"	3:15
8.	"A Raymond Chandler Evening"	3:05
9.	"Cabaña del Gringo"	3:08
10.	"Hawaiian Blue"	4:40
11.	"Green Sunshine"	6:23
12.	"Kashmir Sweater"	3:10
Total length:		46:41
