= Wovoka (album) =

Studio album by Redbone
- Released: November 1973
- Recorded: June–October 1973
- Genre: Rock; pop
- Length: 34:25 (international release); 38:06 (UK release)
- Label: Epic
- Producer: Pat Vegas, Lolly Vegas and Alex Kazanegras

Redbone chronology
Already Here (1972)	Wovoka (1973)	Beaded Dreams Through Turquoise Eyes (1974)

Singles from Wovoka
- 1. "Come and Get Your Love" / "Day to Day Life" Released: 1974; 2. "We Were All Wounded at Wounded Knee" / "Speakeasy" Released: 1973 [Europe only]; 3. "Wovoka" / "Sweet Lady of Love" Released: 1973

Wovoka is the fifth album by the Mexican-Native American rock band Redbone. It was recorded between June and October 1973, and released in November 1973 on Epic Records. The album was produced by brothers Pat Vegas (bass, vocals) and Lolly Vegas (guitars, vocals), in addition to sound engineer Alex Kazanegras. It was the last Redbone album to feature Peter DePoe on drums. Wovoka was recorded with the help of multiple session musicians, including several additional backing vocalists. All main members of the band notably contributed to vocals. As with the band's other releases, Wovoka features songs with Native American themes; each of the band members at the time had either Native American or Mexican heritage. The album is named after the Paiute religious leader Wovoka, who founded the ghost dance movement.

Wovoka peaked on the US Billboard 200 at number 66 in 1974. The single "Come and Get Your Love" reached number five on the Billboard Hot 100. The single "We Were All Wounded at Wounded Knee" topped the Belgian and Dutch charts in 1973, but was absent from the American release after it was deemed too offensive for some audiences.

== Reception ==
Professional ratings
Review scores
Source	Rating
Allmusic	2/5 stars
Billboard	Positive
Record World	Positive

Billboard named Wovoka as a "top album pick" on November 24, 1973, suggesting that "Come and Get Your Love" should be played on radio and commenting: "...the Indian element is strong here and surges constantly through the music." Record World also complimented the album for "mix[ing] modern melodies and harmonies with tribal rhythms without becoming excessively mannered or tedious."

== Track listing ==
The track "We Were All Wounded at Wounded Knee" was dropped from the US/Canadian release (KE 32462) due to its controversial theme. The song did appear on the European release (EPC 65500), and was moderately successful on the continent (see main Redbone entry).

The LP version of "Come and Get Your Love" starts with a slow rendition of the chorus. This intro was cut from the single release.

Side One
No.	Title	Writer(s)	Length
1.	"Wovoka"	Pat Vegas; Lolly Vegas	3:00
2.	"Sweet Lady of Love"	L. Vegas	3:01
3.	"Someday (A Good Song)"	P. Vegas; Tony Bellamy	4:12
4.	"Liquid Truth"	L. Vegas	5:03
5.	"We Were All Wounded at Wounded Knee" (UK release only)	P. Vegas; Sandy Baron	3:30

Side Two
No.	Title	Writer(s)	Length
6.	"Come and Get Your Love"	L. Vegas	4:59
7.	"Day to Day Life"	P. Vegas; Bellamy	2:42
8.	"Chant Wovoka / Clouds In My Sunshine"	P. Vegas	4:43
9.	"23rd and Mad"	L. Vegas; Peter DePoe	6:46

=== CD ===
Released on the Epic label in 1990, a track edit was made to the album. The track boundary on the short "Chant Wovoka" vocal was moved. This meant that track 6 was now "Day to Day Life"/"Chant Wovoka" (3:43) and track 7 was now "Clouds in My Sunshine" (3:45).

== Charts ==
Chart (1974)	Peak position
US Billboard 200	66

== Personnel ==
- Lolly Vegas – lead guitar, electric sitar, leslie guitar, vocals
- Tony Bellamy – rhythm guitar, wah wah guitar, piano, vocals
- Pat Vegas – bass, fuzz bass, vocals
- Butch Rillera – drums, background vocals
- Peter DePoe – drums, background vocals

=== Additional personnel ===
- Gene Page – orchestrator
- Joe Sample – piano, vibraphone
- Sherry Williams – background vocals
- Eddie Caciedo – percussion
- Johnny Lopez – background vocals
