= Judd Hamilton =

- Born: Judd Douglas Hamilton; Republic, Washington
- Genres: Surf, Rock, Country
- Instruments: Vocals, guitar
- Years active: 1960s - Present
- Labels: Dolton; Liberty; American International; United Artists; RCA Victor
- Formerly of: Judd Hamilton & the Furys, The Avantis, The Marketts, The T-Bones, Hamilton & Munro, Judd and Miss Munro, The Hamilton Brothers

Judd Douglas Hamilton is an American musician, former band leader, writer, film producer, actor, and inventor. He recorded for the Dolton, Liberty, American International, United Artists and RCA Victor labels. He contributed to the music of California, and to surf music from his involvement with the T-Bones and 1960s surf groups, the Avantis and the Ventures. During the 1960s, he was part of the groups Judd Hamilton & the Furys, The Marketts and The T-Bones. As a film and television producer, he was the executive producer and co-screenwriter for the films Maniac and The Last Horror Film, and the executive producer for The 7th Annual Sci-Fi Awards, a 90-minute TV special. His brother was Dan Hamilton a member of the 70's band Hamilton, Joe Frank & Reynolds. He was married to English actress Caroline Munro for some years.

Judd and Dan were members of The Marketts.

== Background ==
Judd Douglas Hamilton was still attending college when he was in The Furys. He wrote a song which when released put the group's name in the KMEL Top 10. From meeting people and progressing through the musical inroads, he was responsible for the classic surf record, "Wax 'em Down". Both Judd and brother Dan were members of The T-Bones. He was responsible for putting together the touring version of the group, which also recorded as The T-Bones. The January 22, 1966 issue of Cash Box listed the T-Bones' line up as 23 year old Judd Hamilton on rhythm guitar, his 21-year-old brother Danny on lead guitar, 24 year old drummer Gene Pello, 23 year old bass guitarist George Dee, and 23 year old organist and saxophonist Richard Torres. They had also just completed an LP. Both Judd and Dan were also members of The Marketts.

Hamilton also acted in film as well as writing and producing. He produced the classic horror slasher Maniac which starred Joe Spinnel.

Hamilton was possibly mistakenly credited with being a member of The Chambers Brothers. The source was an article in the March 28, 1970 issue of Record World. Apparently, Hamilton was at a party for an American International Records signing and there was confusion about the Chambers Brothers signing to the label or, and Hamilton being a member of the group. The next issue (April 4) clarified that The Chambers Brothers were not with American International and were with Columbia Records. It also stated that Hamilton was not a member of The Chambers Brothers.

Between 1975 and 1977, at least four singles were released with his wife Caroline Munro, including "You Got It" which had a run of popularity on the radio. They were the first act to have a UK release on the new Aquarius label. Some singles were billed as made by Judd and Miss Munro. The couple divorced in 1982.

In 2008, Judd and Dan Hamilton were the cover subject as well as main article in the surf music magazine, Pipeline #77, the story of JUDD & DANNY HAMILTON.

== Music career ==
=== 1960s ===
In 1960, Hamilton was a freshman at Wenatchee Valley College. He entered a talent show with a song he wrote. He was approached by KMEL DJ Don Bernier, who was in the audience that night. Bernier proposed that Hamilton should record with a band called The Furys. A few weeks later, Bernier drove the band over to a Spokane radio station, recording a few tracks. The resulting single was "I’m Not Around Anymore" backed by "Little Lost Angel", released on Julian J-101. In 1961, the single was reported in Billboard Music Week as having some sales potential. It went into the KMEL Top 10.

Hamilton & the Furys appeared at Wenatchee's Roller Rink as the opening act for the Ventures and Bobby Vee. Guitarist Bob Bogle invited Hamilton to look him up if he was ever in Hollywood. Hamilton left college in 1961 and headed to Hollywood where he was invited to work as a roadie for the Ventures. Within the year, Bogle decided to record a single with Hamilton, "On A Night Like This" backed with "'Til I Found You", under the name of Shane. It was arranged by Hank Levine, and advertised in Billboard.

In 1963, he recorded the Johnny Mercer song "Dream", backed by the Ventures, along with an original composition, "Your Only Boy", releasing on Dolton. It was given a four star rating: it had potential to be stocked. It was given a B+ rating by Cash Box, with the reviewer mentioning a similarity with The Marcels' song "Blue Moon".

In 1965, "No Matter What Shape (Your Stomach's In)" by the T-Bones was climbing the charts. The musicians that played on the recording were session musicians, the Wrecking Crew. Liberty Records wanted to promote the song, while the Wrecking Crew were on the road. Hamilton was approached by Joe Saraceno, a producer for Liberty in November. He got the job of putting together a band to play live as the T-Bones. Hamilton became the rhythm guitarist for the group and made his brother Dan be the lead-guitarist. He got George Dee to be the bass player, Gene Pello on drums and Richard Torres as keyboard and sax player. Dan Hamilton and Richard Torres left the band and were replaced by Tommy Reynolds, Joe Frank Carollo and Jay Allen. A touring version of the T-Bones was formed. When the group arrived back in Los Angeles, they were invited to play a benefit event at the Aquarius Theater. The T-Bones recorded Everyone's Gone to the Moon, the last studio album credited to the T-Bones. The photo of this line up is on the back of the album.

In 1966, according to Cash Box, T-Bones' line up was 23 year old Judd Hamilton on rhythm guitar, his 21-year-old brother "Danny" on lead guitar, 24 year old drummer Gene Pello, 23 year old bass guitarist George Dee, and 23 year old organist and saxophonist Richard Torres. They completed an LP.

=== 1970s to 1980s ===
By June 1970, Hamilton had completed his part in the Paramount Pictures film A Talent for Loving, while his next solo single, a Johnny Cymbal composition, "Rules" and "Someday Morning", was released on American International Records. He was one of the first acts that signed to the label. That year, he had the single, Sunshine Man" bw "Baltimore" released on American International Records A-163. The record was made up of swamp pop. Record World gave it four stars.

In 1971, he had a single released on the United Artists label, "Mixed-Up Guy". It was a Mirror Pick by Record Mirror. Even though the reviewer noted Hamilton's good singing, the record was noted more for performance than sales. Other singles released were "Rose by Any Other Name" and "Don't Be Afraid of the World", and on the following year "Long Road" and "C'Est La Vie".

Judd and Dan Hamilton were the cover subject as well as main article in the surf music magazine, Pipeline #77, the story of JUDD & DANNY HAMILTON.

Hamilton and Caroline Munro's single "You Got It", Released on Aquarius AQ 3, was talked about in Kevin Allen's Soul Gossip column in April 10 issue of Record Mirror. With the segment beginning with "blue - eyed soul strikes again!", Allen drew comparisons with the recent hits Hamilton, Joe Frank and Reynolds, and R&J Stone, while James Hamilton in his Disco Page made a Sonny & Cher reference. The record was a UK radio hit in 1976.

== Production, composer, A&R ==
In 1964, along with former Dolton Records label mate Bill Shaw, Hamilton worked for Regency Records as an A&R man. One of the acts he recorded was Danny and the Memories which was headed by a pre-Crazy Horse Danny Whitten. He also had Pat and Lolly Vegas, his brother Dan, Leon Russell, Dave Gates and Gary Leeds to record as the Avantis, producing "Gypsy Surfer" and "Wax 'em Down". Backed with "Gypsy Surfer", it was released on Chancellor C-1144 and became a local hit. It was also picked by the Astra label and bootlegged.

After recording the final T-Bones album, Dan Hamilton rejoined the group for a Japan tour with the lineup once again, including the Hamilton Bros., along with Joe Frank Carollo and Tommy Reynolds. After the Japanese tour, the T-Bones disbanded. Dan, Joe Frank and Tommy got back together in 1970 as Hamilton, Joe Frank & Reynolds. Judd lived in London and helped from behind the scenes. The band signed a record deal with ABC Dunhill. Their first single, "Don't Pull Your Love Out", became a million selling gold record, reaching No. 1 on Cashbox and No. 3 on the Billboard charts in 1971. Reynolds left the group in 1972. Alan Dennison joined, on keyboards. They eventually signed with Playboy Records and made their first single, "Fallin' in Love", became their next gold record hitting No. 1 on the Billboard Charts in 1975.

In 1990, after spending twenty years in Europe, Hamilton returned to Spokane. He started his own small recording studio and was looking forward to working on a project with his brother Dan as the Hamilton Brothers. Dan Hamilton died just before Christmas in 1994 and thus the project never eventuated. In 1995, an interview with Judd Hamilton in the Spokesman-Review, there was a strong indication that Hamilton was going to produce a greatest hits CD on a Spokane label.

== Film work ==
Hamilton had a co-starring role in the Richard Quine 1969 Western, A Talent for Loving. He played the part of Jim, one of Major Patten's adopted sons. It was allegedly on the set that Hamilton met Caroline Munro who was to become his wife. In 1978 he co-starred in the sci-fi film Starcrash alongside Caroline Munro, Christopher Plummer, David Hasselhoff, Marjoe Gortner, Joe Spinell. Along with Joe Spinell, he was the executive producer for the 1980 horror film Maniac which starred Spinell and Caroline Munro.

In 1980, he played a major role in the television special, 1980 Sci-Fi Awards, where he was an executive producer and writer. The event was hosted by Caroline Munro and Mark Hamill. During a rehearsal, Caroline Munro was overcome by a fever and nearly fell from the stage.

In 1981 he co-wrote the screenplay, executively produced and co-starred in his last film The Last Horror Film, which starred Caroline Munro and Joe Spinell.

== Later activities ==
Hamilton holds a patent granted in 2013 for an advanced ceramic concrete radiation shielding material, with another pending.

== Discography ==
Judd Hamilton singles
Act	Title	Cat	Year	Loc	Notes #
Judd Hamilton and the Furys	"I’m Not Around Anymore" / "Little Lost Angel"	Julian Records J-101	1961	US	
Shane	"On a Night Like This" / "'Til I Found You"	Unity CP-2112	1962	US	
Judd Hamilton	"Dream" / "Your Only Boy"	Dolton Records No. 80	1963	US	
Judd Hamilton	"Flight 103" / "Initials on a Tree"	Regency 111	1964	US	
Judd Hamilton	"Rules" / "Sunday Morning"	American International A-151	1970	US	
Judd Hamilton	"Sunshine Man" / "Baltimore"	American International A-163	1970	US	
Judd Hamilton	"We Love You Mr Pompidou" / "We Love You Mr Pompidou" (instr)	AMI Records 86031	C 1971	(France)	
Judd Hamilton	"Mixed-Up Guy" / "Whatever Happened to July"	United Artists UP 35247	1971	UK	
Judd Hamilton	"Rose by Any Other Name" / "Don't Be Afraid of the World"	United Artists UP 35311	1971	UK	
Judd Hamilton	"Long Road" / "C'Est La Vie"	United Artists UP 35367	1972	UK	
Judd Hamilton	"Bonne chance, si tu l’aimes" / "Something happens"	Philips	1973	France	
Hamilton & Munro	"Come Softly to Me" / "Sad Old Song"	King Kong Records 52001	1979	France	
Judd And Miss Munro	"You Got It" / "Where Does Love Begin"	Aquarius AQ 3	1976	UK	
Judd And Miss Munro	"Rhythm of the Rain" / "Sound of the Sun"	RCA Victor RCA 2753	1976	UK	
Judd Hamilton And Caroline Munro	"Love Songs" / "Sound of the Sun"	RCA Victor PB 5021	1977	UK	

Arrangement, production, etc.
Act	Title	Cat	Year	Role	Notes #
The Avantis	"Wax 'Em Down" / " Gypsy Surfer"	Chancellor 1144	1963	Arranger for both sides	
The Avantis	"Surfin' Granny" / "Do the Surfin' Granny"	Regency RP 107	1964	Co writer for side 1 Arranger for both sides	
The Avantis	"Phantom Surfer" / "Lucille"	Regency 110	1964	Co-writer side 1 Arranger both sides	
The T-Bones	"Fare Thee Well" / "Let's Go Get Stoned"	Liberty 55906	1966	Co-writer side 1	
Spheres	Festivals and Suns	Spheres SP 001	1978	Co-writer on "Savitri"	
Jay Chattaway	Bande Originale Du Film "Maniac"	Milan A 120 151	1982	Executive producer	

== Filmography ==
Film
Film	Actor role	Crew role	Director	Year	Notes #
A Talent for Loving	Jim		Richard Quine	1969	
Starcrash	Elle		Luigi Cozzi	1978	
Racquet	Performer		David Winters	1979	
Maniac		Executive producer	William Lustig	1980	
The Last Horror Film	Alan Cunningham	Producer; Writer	David Winters	1982	
FantastiCozzi	Elle		Felipe M. Guerra	2016	A documentary

TV shows and specials
Title	Episode	Role	Crew role	Director	Year	Notes #
Where the Action Is	Episode #2.99	Himself; Member of the T-Bones			1966	aired 28 January 1966
Beat! Beat! Beat!	Hullabaloo - 31.01.1966	Himself; Member of the T-Bones			1966	aired 9 December 1966
Dick Clark's American Bandstand	Episode #9.25	Himself; Member of the T-Bones			1966	aired 26 February 1966
Cadet Rousselle	Episode dated 7 June 1973	Himself			1973	(Talk show) aired 7 June 1973
The 1980 Sci-Fi Awards			Writer; Exec producer	Myrl A. Schreibman	1980	TV special 23 November 1980
