= Cycles (Redbone album) =

Studio album by Redbone
- Released: 1977
- Genre: Funk
- Length: 40:19
- Label: RCA
- Producers: Linda Creed and Jerry Goldstein in association with Pat Vegas and Lolly Vegas

Redbone chronology
Beaded Dreams Through Turquoise Eyes (1974)	Cycles (1977)	Redbone Live (1994)

Cycles is the seventh album by Native American/Mexican American band Redbone, released on the RCA label in 1977. The lyrics on this album have substantially less to do with Native American history and traditions in comparison to many of the band's previous efforts and the music employs a more disco-inspired feel with longer compositions to match.

This album is notable for being the only studio album to feature contributions from Aloisio Aguiar and Linda Creed.

== Background ==
After releasing the album Beaded Dreams Through Turquoise Eyes in 1974, Redbone set to work on a new album to be released in 1975. However, the lead single that preceded the album (a song called "I've Got to Find the Right Woman"), failed to chart high and resulted in the album's release being canceled. The band's contract with Epic Records was then terminated and they were dropped from the label. Consequently, they did not return to the studio until 1976, at the recommendation of producer/songwriter/singer Linda Creed. Pat Vegas later recalled of the album's beginning:

"Lolly and I were in limbo. Then Linda Creed, who was a fan from Philadelphia who had written 'Betcha By Golly Wow' for The Stylistics and 'The Greatest Love Of All' for Whitney Houston, signed with a West Coast company called Far Out Productions which was working with War. She said 'Look, I just signed a production deal with Far Out and I want you and Lolly to come and talk to them.' So we did and that's how we came to record Cycles."

This was the last studio album released by the band until 2005's Peace Pipe. Ex-Bloodstone drummer Eddie Summers, who co-wrote one track on Cycles, also performed on the band's only live album, which was recorded the same year.

== Critical reception ==
Professional ratings
Review scores
Source	Rating
AllMusic	2/5 stars

Newsday determined that "there's nothing aside from routine funk here."

== Track listing ==
All tracks written and sung by Lolly and Pat Vegas unless otherwise specified.

Side one
No.	Title	Writer(s)	Lead Vocals	Length
1.	"Cycles"			4:48
2.	"Open (Give It Back to Me)"	L. Vegas, P. Vegas, Eddie Summers	P. Vegas	3:20
3.	"Gamble (Take a Chance on Me)"			3:30
4.	"Ooh"	L. Vegas	L. Vegas	5:05
5.	"Give Our Love Another Try"		P. Vegas	4:56

Side two
No.	Title	Writer(s)	Lead Vocals	Length
6.	"Dancing Bones"		P. Vegas	5:05
7.	"Checkin' It Out"	L. Vegas	L. Vegas	4:59
8.	"Funky Silk"	P. Vegas	P. Vegas	4:10
9.	"Don't Say No"			4:26
Total length:				40:32

Cassette listing

Side one
No.	Title	Length
1.	"Dancing Bones"	5:05
2.	"Checkin' It Out"	4:59
3.	"Ooh"	5:05
4.	"Give Our Love Another Try"	4:56

Side two
No.	Title	Length
5.	"Cycles"	4:48
6.	"Open (Give It Back to Me)"	3:20
7.	"Gamble (Take a Chance on Me)"	3:30
8.	"Funky Silk"	4:10
9.	"Don't Say No"	4:26

== Personnel ==
- Lolly Vegas – guitars, vocals
- Pat Vegas – bass, percussion, vocals
- Aloisio Aguiar – acoustic piano, Fender Rhodes, clavinet, string ensemble, percussion

Additional personnel

- Linda Creed – background vocals, production
- Jerry Goldstein – background vocals, management, production
- Lee Oskar – art direction
- Stan Harris – coordinator
- Paul Whitehead – cover
- Chris Huston – engineer
- Ed Barton – mixing
