= Peace Pipe (Redbone album) =

2005 studio album by Redbone

Studio album by Redbone
- Released: 2005
- Length: 37:34
- Label: Alter-Native (2005); Bassline (2009)

Redbone chronology
Redbone Live (1994)	Peace Pipe (2005)

Peace Pipe is the eighth and final studio album by Native American rock band Redbone. It was initially released in 2005 under the name One World and was re-titled and re-released in 2009. The album was released in digital format in 2012, along with a music video for the track "One World".

== Track listing ==
=== One World (2005) – Alter-Native Records 6 14346 01644 3 ===
1. "One World" (Pat Vegas / Lolly Vegas / Gino Dente) – 3:02
2. "Love is Magic" (P. Vegas / L. Vegas) – 3:33
3. "The Best for You" (P. Vegas / Tony Avila) – 4:34
4. "Beverly Blvd. Blues" (P. Vegas / L. Vegas) – 3:36
5. "Custer Had It Comin'" (P. Vegas) – 2:57
6. "I Am Somebody" (P. Vegas / L. Vegas) – 4:23
7. "It's a Brand New Day" (P. Vegas / L. Vegas) – 3:56
8. "Mystery Man" (P. Vegas / L. Vegas / G. Dente / Jimmy Greenspoon) – 4:30
9. "Arigato" (P. Vegas / L. Vegas / G. Dente / J. Greenspoon) – 3:16
10. "Bad Boys" (P. Vegas / L. Vegas / Peter Smith) – 3:47

=== Peace Pipe (2009) – Bassline Records 8 84501 17402 2 ===
1. "Beverly Blvd. Blues" (P. Vegas / L. Vegas) – 3:36
2. "I Am Somebody" (P. Vegas / L. Vegas) – 4:23
3. "One World" (P. Vegas / L. Vegas / Gino Dente) – 3:02
4. "It's a Brand New Day" (P. Vegas / L. Vegas) – 3:56
5. "Love is Magic" (P. Vegas / L. Vegas) – 3:33
6. "Custer Had It Coming" (P. Vegas) – 2:57
7. "Mystery Man" (P. Vegas / L. Vegas / G. Dente / J. Greenspoon) – 4:30
8. "Arigato" (P. Vegas / L. Vegas / G. Dente / J. Greenspoon) – 3:16
9. "Bad Boys" (P. Vegas / L. Vegas / Peter Smith) – 3:47
10. "The Best for You" (P. Vegas / Tony Avila) – 4:34

== Personnel ==
- Lolly Vegas – guitars, vocals
- Pat Vegas – bass, vocals, percussion
