= Potlatch (album) =

Studio album by Redbone
- Released: October 1970
- Length: 34:02
- Label: Epic
- Producers: Lolly Vegas, Pete Welding

Redbone chronology
| Redbone (1970) | Potlatch (1970) | Message from a Drum (1971) |

Singles from Potlach
- 1. "Maggie" Released: 1970; 2. "Light as a Feather" Released: 1971; 3. "Chant: 13th Hour" Released: 1971

Professional ratings
Review scores
| Source | Rating |
|---|---|
| Allmusic | link |

Potlatch is the second album by Native American rock band Redbone.

== Track listing ==
Side one
| No. | Title | Writer(s) | Length |
|---|---|---|---|
| 1. | "Maggie" | L. Vegas | 5:08 |
| 2. | "Light As A Feather" | P. Vegas | 1:56 |
| 3. | "Who Can Say?" | L. Vegas | 2:51 |
| 4. | "Judgement Day" | L. Vegas | 2:32 |
| 5. | "Without Reservation" | L. Vegas; P. Vegas; R.A. Bellamy; P. DePoe | 4:12 |

Side two
| No. | Title | Music | Length |
|---|---|---|---|
| 1. | "Chant: 13th Hour" | P. Vegas | 5:38 |
| 2. | "Alcatraz" | P. Vegas | 2:33 |
| 3. | "Drinkin' And Blo" | L. Vegas | 2:17 |
| 4. | "Bad News Ain't No News At All" | P. Vegas | 3:10 |
| 5. | "New Blue Sermonette" | L. Vegas | 3:27 |

2004 Repertoire Records CD reissue bonus tracks – RES 2317
| No. | Title | Music | Length |
|---|---|---|---|
| 1. | "Maggie" (Single Edit) | L. Vegas | 2:42 |
| 2. | "New Blue Sermonette" (Single Version) | L. Vegas | 3:27 |

== Personnel ==
- Lolly Vegas – guitar (Leslie), vocals
- Tony Bellamy – guitar (Wah-Wah), vocals
- Pat Vegas – bass, vocals
- Peter DePoe – drums, percussion

== Charts ==
| Chart (1970) | Peak position |
|---|---|
| US Billboard 200 | 99 |
