= Starcrash =

1978 space opera film by Luigi Cozzi

- Film poster by John Solie
- Directed by: Luigi Cozzi
- Screenplay by: Luigi Cozzi; Nat Wachsberger; R.A. Dillon
- Produced by: Nat Wachsberger; Patrick Wachsberger
- Starring: Marjoe Gortner; Caroline Munro; David Hasselhoff; Joe Spinell; Robert Tessier; Nadia Cassini; Judd Hamilton; Christopher Plummer
- Cinematography: Paul Beeson; Roberto D'Ettorre Piazzoli
- Edited by: Sergio Montanari
- Music by: John Barry
- Production companies: Bancom Audiovision Corporation; Film Enterprise Production
- Distributed by: Fida Cinematografica (Italy); New World Pictures (U.S.)
- Release dates: 10 December 1978 (West Germany); 3 January 1979 (Italy); 9 March 1979 (U.S.)
- Running time: 94 minutes
- Countries: Italy; United States
- Language: English
- Budget: $4 million
- Box office: $2,250,000

Starcrash (Italian: Scontri stellari oltre la terza dimensione, lit. 'Starfights Beyond the Third Dimension') is a 1978 space opera film directed and co-written by Luigi Cozzi, and starring Marjoe Gortner, Caroline Munro, David Hasselhoff, Joe Spinell and Christopher Plummer.

Widely regarded as a "cash-in" on the unprecedented success of Star Wars, the film was an international co-production between Italy and the United States. Filmed at Cinecittà studios in Rome, the film was produced independently by the father-and-son duo of Nat and Patrick Wachsburger. It features a musical score composed by John Barry.

Released by New World Pictures on December 10, 1978, it received generally negative reviews from critics, but has developed a cult following. The film was riffed on by Mystery Science Theater 3000 in the first reboot season.

== Plot ==
In a distant galaxy, a starship searches for the evil Count Zarth Arn. Closing in on a planet, the ship is attacked by a mysterious weapon which drives the crew insane. Three escape pods launch, but the ship crashes into the atmosphere of the planet and is destroyed.

Meanwhile, smugglers Stella Star and Akton run into the Imperial Space Police, led by robot sheriff Elle and Police Chief Thor. Akton and Stella escape by jumping into hyperspace. When they emerge, they discover an escape pod from the attacked starship, and in it, a disoriented survivor. The police track their hyperspace trail and apprehend them. Tried and convicted of piracy, they are sentenced to life in prison on separate planets. Stella escapes from her prison, but Elle and Thor recapture her, only to inform her the authorities have canceled her sentence; she is taken to an orbiting ship, where she is reunited with Akton. They are contacted by the Emperor of the Galaxy, who thanks them for recovering the starship survivor. The Emperor orders Stella and Akton to find a secret weapon of immense power which Count Zarth Arn has hidden away. They are offered clemency if they help find two more missing escape pods as well as the mothership, one of which may contain the Emperor's only son.

Accompanied by Thor and Elle, Stella and Akton arrive at the location Akton computes for the first escape pod. Stella and Elle take a shuttle and land near the pod on a beach. There are no survivors. Stella meets an Amazonian warrior tribe and is escorted to their underground fortress. On arrival, Elle is ambushed, shot and left for dead, and Stella is taken before Amazon Queen Corelia, who is in league with Zarth Arn. Elle, revealed not to have died, makes his way to the throne room, taking Corelia hostage to secure Stella's release. They escape, but the queen activates a giant robot which chases them until they are rescued by Akton and Thor.

On an uninhabited, frozen planet, Stella and Elle investigate the mothership crash site. They find no survivors. Upon their return to the ship, Thor, who has ambushed and apparently knocked out Akton, reveals that he is an agent of Zarth Arn. Thor locks Stella and Elle outside on the planet's surface, where the temperature drops thousands of degrees at night. Elle preserves Stella's life by using his energy to keep her heart going while they freeze over in the snow. Akton revives and battles Thor, killing him and subsequently rescuing Elle and Stella.

Approaching the planet of the third escape pod, their ship comes under attack from the weapon which downed the starship. Akton steers the ship through it, saving them. Stella and Elle, inspecting the pod wreckage, are attacked by cavemen who smash Elle to pieces and abduct Stella. The Emperor's son, Prince Simon, arrives and rescues her by firing lasers through his eyes. They are again attacked and overpowered by the cavemen, but Akton appears and fights them off with his laser sword; he then reveals that they are standing on the Count's weaponized planet.

Arriving at an underground laboratory, the three are captured by guards. The Count appears and reveals his plan to use them as bait to bring the Emperor to the planet and then have his weapon self-destruct, destroying the planet, the Emperor and all three of them. He leaves, ordering his two robot golems to keep the group there. Akton engages them in a laser sword duel and defeats the robots, but is mortally wounded by one of them and fades away, thanks to Simon's assistance, which helps to continue the duel with one of them. The Emperor arrives and fires a green ray from his flagship to "stop time" for three minutes, allowing them all to escape as the planet explodes.

A battle commences between the Emperor's armada and the Count's, with the Emperor's soldiers storming the Count's space station. The attack fails and the victorious Count gets ready to destroy the Emperor's home planet. The Emperor decides to ram the Count's space station with a massive space station, the Floating City, in a 4th dimensional attack, “Starcrash”. Elle has been rebuilt by the Emperor's men. Stella and Elle fly the City towards the space station and escape together just as their station crashes into the Count's, winning the war.

Stella and Elle are picked up by Simon and the two humans embrace. The Emperor delivers a victory speech.

== Cast ==
- Caroline Munro as Stella Star, a young smuggler, who is the best astro-pilot in the whole universe. Munro's voice was re-dubbed by an uncredited Candy Clark.
- Marjoe Gortner as Akton, Stella's loyal sidekick, human in appearance, endowed with mystical powers including the power to bring people back to life. He fights with a laser sword similar to a Star Wars lightsaber.
- Judd Hamilton as Elle, a powerful robot policeman Hamilton's voice was re-dubbed by an uncredited Hamilton Camp.
- David Hasselhoff as Prince Simon, the Emperor's only son and the sole survivor of Zarth Arn's assault on his ship.
- Christopher Plummer as The Emperor of the First Circle of the Universe.
- Joe Spinell as Count Zarth Arn, a megalomaniac renegade.
- Robert Tessier as Thor, Chief of the Imperial State Police.
- Nadia Cassini as Corelia, Queen of the Amazon women on the first planet that Stella and her crew visit.

== Production ==
=== Development ===
In an interview with Variety, director Luigi Cozzi described Starcrash as "science fantasy" as opposed to science fiction. Cozzi also claimed that although people assume Starcrash was an attempt to capitalize on the popularity of Star Wars, the design of the picture and its script were developed prior to the release of Star Wars. The film's producer and screenwriter, Nat Wachsberger, and his son, producer Patrick Wachsberger, who had just developed the American production company Film Enterprises Productions, signed on to the film in May 1977 during the Cannes Film Festival after viewing sample work created by Cozzi for investors.

Cozzi was credited on the film under the anglicized name 'Lewis Coates.'

=== Casting ===
Actors Caroline Munro and Judd Hamilton were married at the time. Both actors had their voices re-dubbed in post-production, Munro by Candy Clark and Hamilton by Hamilton Camp.

Christopher Plummer said of the filming, "Give me Rome any day. I'll do porno in Rome, as long as I can get to Rome. Getting to Rome was the greatest thing that happened in that for me. I think it was only about three days in Rome on that one. It was all shot at once". Discussing his role as the Emperor, he said, "How can you play the Emperor of The Universe? What a wonderful part to play. It puts God in a very dicey moment, doesn't it? He's very insecure, God, when the Emperor’s around."

=== Filming ===
Principal photography began on October 15, 1977 at the Cinecittà studios in Rome, Italy. The Hollywood Reporter stated that shooting also took place in Morocco, Tunisia and in Hollywood. Roberto Girometti and Giuseppe Lanci are credited with "additional photography". The film was scheduled to be completed by mid-December 1977. The budget was $4 million.

Shooting took over six months and was frequently brought to a halt due to financing problems.

=== Visual effects ===
Cozzi stated that the miniatures were completed by Italian artists, while American developers were recruited for the special effects, including snorkel photography, computer photography and mechanical effects. Visual effects supervisor Armando Valcauda was responsible for the effects, including stop motion.

== Soundtrack ==
The score for Starcrash was composed and conducted by veteran composer John Barry. The soundtrack was given a limited release of 1,500 copies by BSX Records in December 2008, and features 14 tracks of score.

1. "Starcrash Main Title" (2:36)
2. "Escape Into Hyperspace" (1:49)
3. "Captured" (2:09)
4. "Launch Adrift" (1:42)
5. "Beach Landing" (2:09)
6. "The Ice Planet/Heading for Zarkon" (3:03)
7. "The Emperor's Speech" (3:17)
8. "Strange Planet/The Troggs Attack" (2:37)
9. "Akton Battles the Robots" (2:18)
10. "Network Ball Attack" (1:00)
11. "Space War" (4:40)
12. "Goodbye Akton" (3:34)
13. "Starcrash End Title" (2:57)
14. "Starcrash Suite" (7:14)

== Release ==
The film was originally made for American International Pictures, but after seeing the final cut, they declined to release it. New World Pictures stepped in instead.

The film premiered in West Germany on December 21, 1978. It was released in Los Angeles on March 7, 1979.

=== Critical reception ===
In a contemporary review, Variety noted that the film had a "weak screenplay" and that Cozzi's direction "seemed to have no apparent plan". Variety commented that "what is surprising for a picture of this genre, however, is the lacklustre photography by Paul Beeson and Roberto D'Ettorre and special effects by Armando Valcauda and German Natali", and that the "photography almost never convinces that this is actually taking place anywhere but on the movie screen and special effects seem little more than poor imitations of what's been done before". The Monthly Film Bulletin noted the "mediocre special effects and a clumsily protracted finale", but stated that Starcrash "intermittently achieves a kind of lunatic appeal as it lurches pell-mell from one casually fabricated climax to the next".

A retrospective review by Kurt Dahlke of DVD Talk said, "Starcrash is a masterpiece of unintentionally bad filmmaking. Pounded out in about 18 months seemingly as an answer to Star Wars, Luigi Cozzi's knock-off buzzes around with giddy brio, mixing ridiculous characters with questionably broad acting, an incredibly simple yet still nonsensical plot derivative to Star Wars, and budget special effects that transcend into the realm of real art. It's a completely ridiculous movie, that's great to watch with a few friends and a beer or two. And it still manages to make my jaw drop." R. L. Shaffer of IGN gave the film a rating of 10 out of 10, declaring it the "single greatest sci-fi camp fest ever put on celluloid" and put it in a league with cult classics like Troll 2, Riki-Oh: The Story of Ricky and The Room. On Rotten Tomatoes, the film has an aggregate score of 33% based on 3 positive and 6 negative critic reviews.

In 2015, Starcrash was chosen by Rolling Stone as one of the 50 Best Sci-Fi Movies of the 1970s.

=== Accolades ===
At the 7th Saturn Awards, it was nominated for the Best International Film.

== In popular culture ==
The film was featured on the movie-mocking television show Mystery Science Theater 3000 in 2017.

The film was the subject of an episode of the podcast How Did This Get Made? recorded at the Dominion Energy Center in Richmond, Virginia on July 20, 2019.

== See also ==
- Italian science fiction cinema
- List of cult films: S
