= Come and Get Your Love =

1974 single by Redbone

- Cover of the 1974 Netherlands single

Single by Redbone

from the album Wovoka
- B-side: "Day to Day Life"
- Released: January 1974
- Genre: Pop rock; dance-rock; disco; soul
- Length: 5:02 (album version); 3:27 (single version); 2:52 (DJ re-service version)
- Label: Epic
- Songwriter: Lolly Vegas
- Producers: Pat Vegas; Lolly Vegas

Redbone singles chronology
"When You Got Trouble" (1972)	"Come and Get Your Love" (1974)	"Wovoka" (1974)

Music video
- "Come and Get Your Love" on YouTube

Audio
- "Come and Get Your Love" on YouTube

"Come and Get Your Love" is a song by the American rock band Redbone. The song was originally released as a promo track under the name "Hail" and was later featured on their fifth album, Wovoka (1973), under its current name. The song was released as the album's first single that year. Written and produced by band members Pat and Lolly Vegas, it is one of the band's most successful singles. It made them the first Native American band to reach the top five on the US Billboard Hot 100, reaching number five.

Billboard and Cash Box magazines praised the song when it was released. Interest in the song increased in the 2010s after it was featured in the Marvel Cinematic Universe films Guardians of the Galaxy (2014) and Guardians of the Galaxy Vol. 3 (2023), and as the theme song for the sitcom F Is for Family.

== Composition ==
The lyrics and music are by Lolly Vegas. In addition to vocals, Vegas performed the guitar and electric sitar on the song. The lyrics narrate a man being affirming towards his girlfriend, starting with the question "What's the matter with your head?" before encouragements such as "Nothin's a matter with your head, baby".

The single cut is significantly shorter, with the album version featuring an introductory slow part, plus a longer repeated coda. Most radio stations rarely play the latter. The song features a prominent part for electric sitar. A shorter DJ re-service edit of the single version is mainly distinguished by a lead vocal.

== Reception ==
=== Critical reception ===
Cash Box was an early noticer of the song, listing the single in its "Choice Programming" section for "singles...deserving of special programmer consideration" on September 15, 1973. In a review of the Wovoka album on November 24, 1973, Billboard named "Come and Get Your Love" as an example of "moments of highly commercial material...which warrant FM airplay." Arty Goodman of Cash Box recommended "Come and Get Your Love" in his column on March 30, 1974, calling it "one of the best pop records of the year". Following its chart success, Broadcasting magazine regarded this song as Redbone's "most commercially oriented and un-Indian effort."

=== Commercial performance ===
Debuting on January 12 and charting for 23 weeks, the single peaked at number five on the US Billboard Hot 100 chart on April 13, 1974. The single was certified gold by the RIAA on April 22, 1974. The song is Redbone's highest charting single and one of two Top 40 hits by the band. (An earlier recording, "The Witch Queen of New Orleans," peaked at number 21 in 1972.)

In year-end charts, "Come and Get Your Love" ranked no. 4 on the Billboard Top Pop Singles of 1974 and no. 33 on Broadcasting magazine's top 100 radio singles.

In France, the single peaked at number 177 on the singles sales chart (physical sales + downloads) in 2017. The following year, Redbone's version featured in a Christmas 2018 media advertising campaign from Bouygues, the French telecommunications company, and the song soon rose to the top of the pop charts. It entered the downloads chart's Top 10, and reached number one on the singles sales chart at the end of the year. It also peaked at number 20 on the singles chart (downloads plus streaming) during the last week of the year.

== In other media ==
Introducing it with a traditional Native American dance, Redbone performed "Come and Get Your Love" on the NBC variety show The Midnight Special, in the episode of February 22, 1974.

In 2014, "Come and Get Your Love" experienced a resurgence in popularity when it was featured in the Marvel Studios film Guardians of the Galaxy as one of the songs on a mixtape made for the protagonist Peter Quill. It was also included on the film's soundtrack album, which reached the top spot on the Billboard 200 chart. It was later heard and reused in the MCU films Avengers: Endgame and Guardians of the Galaxy Vol. 3, from 2019 and 2023 respectively. From 2015 to 2021, "Come and Get Your Love" was used on Netflix's adult animated sitcom F Is for Family as its theme song.

A cutout style-animated music video was released in 2020.

In August 2021, the song was prominently featured in Season 1, Episode 5, “Come and Get Your Love”, of Reservation Dogs on the streaming service Hulu, with the band Redbone performing the song at the end of the episode.

== Personnel ==
- Lolly Vegas – lead guitar, electric sitar, lead vocals
- Tony Bellamy – rhythm guitar, piano, background vocals
- Pat Vegas – bass, background vocals
- Peter DePoe – drums, background vocals

=== Additional personnel ===
- Gene Page – orchestrator
- Joe Sample – piano, vibraphone
- Eddie Caciedo – percussion

== Charts ==
=== Weekly charts ===
Weekly single chart performance for "Come and Get Your Love"
Chart (1974)	Peak position
Belgium (Ultratop 50 Flanders)	28
Canada Top Singles (RPM)	25
Netherlands (Single Top 100)	21
US Billboard Hot 100	5
US Hot Soul Singles (Billboard)	75

Weekly single chart performance for "Come and Get Your Love"
Chart (2016–2023)	Peak position
France (SNEP)	20
UK Singles Sales Chart (OCC)	30
UK Singles Downloads Chart (OCC)	29

=== Year-end charts ===
Year-end chart performance for "Come and Get Your Love"
Chart (1974)	Rank
Canada (RPM)	190
US (Billboard)	4

== Certifications ==
Sales and certifications for "Come and Get Your Love"
Region	Certification	Certified units/sales
Denmark (IFPI Danmark)	Gold	45,000^{‡}
Italy (FIMI)	Gold	50,000^{‡}
New Zealand (RMNZ)	3× Platinum	90,000^{‡}
Spain (Promusicae)	Gold	30,000^{‡}
United Kingdom (BPI)	2× Platinum	1,200,000^{‡}
United States (RIAA)	Gold	1,000,000^{^}
^{^} Shipments figures based on certification alone.^{‡} Sales+streaming figures based on certification alone.

== Real McCoy version ==
"Come and Get Your Love"

Single by Real McCoy

from the album Another Night
- B-side: "Megablast"
- Released: May 23, 1995
- Genre: Eurodance
- Length: 3:14
- Label: Arista
- Songwriter: Lolly Vegas
- Producers: Per Adebratt; Douglas Carr; Tommy Ekman; David Brunner

Real McCoy singles chronology
"Love & Devotion" (1995)	"Come and Get Your Love" (1995)	"Sleeping with an Angel/Ooh Boy" (1995)

Music video
- "Come and Get Your Love" on YouTube

In 1995, German Eurodance project Real McCoy released a cover version of "Come and Get Your Love", which was released in the United States in May 1995 by Arista Records as the third single from their North American debut album, Another Night (1995). It was produced by Douglas Carr, Per Adebratt and Tommy Ekman, and peaked at number 19 on the US Billboard Hot 100 and number-one on the Billboard Dance Club Play chart in August of the same year. The accompanying music video was directed by Wayne Isham.

The B-side of the single was "Megablast", a song which had previously appeared on their 1994 album Space Invaders. North American releases of the single denoted it as a "bonus track not available on the album", as the song hadn't been released in that territory. It was later added to international releases of the Another Night album.

=== Critical reception ===
Larry Flick from Billboard magazine commented, "The act has a field day with a nearly forgotten '70s pop nugget made famous by Redbone—we are dying to meet the nostalgic mind that came up with such a genius cover choice. Mixes are forthcoming. We are waiting with tambourine in hand." James Richliano from The Boston Globe felt it is "infectiously urbanized here for the '90s". Dave Sholin from the Gavin Report wrote, "Based on immediate programmer reaction, it seemed destined that this cover of Redbone's 1974 hit would be the obvious follow-up to the trio's hits 'Another Night' and 'Runaway'. Polishing it up '90s-style gives the group a clear shot at plenty of radio and club play for the summer ahead."

In his weekly UK chart commentary, James Masterton viewed it as "typical Euro dance, an uptempo beat, a high powered rap and a catchy female vocal, this time one which is too similar to Cyndi Lauper's '(Hey Now) Girls Just Wanna Have Fun' to be accidental but that is not to detract from the success of the track." Music Week gave it a score of four out of five, naming it "a cute and catchy track which is guaranteed to give Ojay, Vanessa and Patsy a fourth worldwide hit." Music Week editor Alan Jones noted that the "jaunty remake incorporates techno-edged synths, house rhythms, ragga rapping and – somewhere in the mix – enough elements of the original, highly infectious song to be sure of their fourth hit in a row."

=== Music video ===
The music video for "Come and Get Your Love" was directed by American music video director Wayne Isham and produced by Joe Flews for Industrial Artists. It was filmed in Los Angeles, the US, and depicts the band at a rooftop of a tall building, performing in front of a sign of large letters spelling out the word "McCOY HOTEL". The video was a Box Top on British music television channel The Box in the beginning of September 1995. One month later, MTV Europe put the video on break out rotation. At the 1995 Billboard Music Video Awards, "Come and Get Your Love" was nominated for Best New Artist Clip in the category for Dance.

=== Track listings ===
- 12-inch, Europe (1995)
1. "Come and Get Your Love" (Long Version) – 4:53
2. "Come and Get Your Love" (NRG-Mix) – 5:10
- CD single, UK (1995)
1. "Come and Get Your Love" (Radio Edit) – 3:12
2. "Come and Get Your Love" (Junior Vasquez Edit) – 4:00
3. "Come and Get Your Love" (Tzant Remix) – 7:32
4. "Come and Get Your Love" (Junior Vasquez Dub) – 7:01
5. "Come and Get Your Love" (Euro Mix) – 5:11
6. "Come and Get Your Love" (Tzant Euromix) – 7:41
- CD maxi, Europe (1995)
1. "Come and Get Your Love" (Radio Edit) – 3:14
2. "Come and Get Your Love" (Long Version) – 4:53
3. "Come and Get Your Love" (NRG-Mix) – 5:10
4. "Megablast" – 5:09

=== Charts ===
==== Weekly charts ====
Weekly chart performance for Real McCoy's cover of "Come and Get Your Love"
Chart (1995)	Peak position
Australia (ARIA)	18
Belgium (Ultratop 50 Flanders)	39
Belgium (Ultratop 50 Wallonia)	39
Canada Top Singles (RPM)	42
Canada Dance/Urban (RPM)	4
Europe (Eurochart Hot 100)	35
Europe (European Dance Radio)	10
Europe (European Hit Radio)	13
Finland (Suomen virallinen lista)	9
Germany (GfK)	53
Iceland (Íslenski Listinn Topp 40)	20
Ireland (IRMA)	22
Israel (Israeli Singles Chart)	14
Netherlands (Dutch Top 40 Tipparade)	3
Netherlands (Single Top 100)	37
New Zealand (Recorded Music NZ)	8
Quebec (ADISQ)	8
Scottish Singles Sales (Official Charts)	21
UK Singles (Official Charts)	19
UK Dance (Official Charts)	25
UK Airplay (Music Week)	33
UK Pop Tip Club Chart (Music Week)	21
US Billboard Hot 100	19
US Dance Club Play (Billboard)	1
US Maxi-Singles Sales (Billboard)	3
US Top 40/Mainstream (Billboard)	10
US Top 40/Rhythm-Crossover (Billboard)	26
US Cash Box Top 100	14
Zimbabwe (ZIMA)	6

==== Year-end charts ====
Year-end chart performance for Real McCoy's cover of "Come and Get Your Love"
Chart (1995)	Position
Australia (ARIA)	86
Latvia (Latvijas Top 50)	191
US Billboard Hot 100	69
US Maxi-Singles Sales (Billboard)	39

=== Release history ===
Release dates and formats for Real McCoy's cover of "Come and Get Your Love"
Region	Date	Format(s)	Label(s)	Ref.
United States	May 23, 1995	Contemporary hit radio	Arista	
United Kingdom	August 14, 1995	12-inch vinyl; CD; cassette	Logic; Hansa; Freshline	
Australia	September 11, 1995	CD; cassette	Hansa	
Japan	September 21, 1995	CD	Hansa	
