= Aqua Velvets =

American surf rock revival band

Aqua Velvets are an American surf rock revival band from San Francisco, California, formed in the 1980s by guitarist Miles Corbin. Rather than simply recreate the vintage 1963 surf sound, Corbin set out to add depth and dimension with original songs that included strings, horns, keyboards, and exotic instruments. The result was a cinematic sound more akin to film composers like Ennio Morricone and John Barry. The group released their debut album in 1992, recorded over a period of several years. This album was recorded in the auto repair shop where bassist Michael Lindner worked. They signed to Atlantic Records in 1995 to release Surfmania; subsequent releases appeared on BMG subsidiary Milan Records. The Velvets continued to release a steady stream of albums through 2015, most notably Tiki Beat (2010) and El Morocco (2015). The Aqua Velvets' songs have been covered by a number of other surf artists. The group performs live mostly on the West Coast.

== Members ==
- Miles Corbin - guitar, songwriting
- Michael Lindner - bass, keyboards, accordion
- Hank Maninger - guitar (also with the Hacienda Brothers and Bonnie Hayes and the Wild Combo)
- Donn Spindt - drums (also with The Rubinoos)
- Tim Gahagan - drums

== Discography ==
Albums:

- The Aqua Velvets (Heyday Records, 1992)
- Surfmania (Atlantic Records, 1995)
- Nomad (Milan Records, 1996)
- Guitar Noir (Milan, 1997)
- Radio Waves (Milan, 2001)
- Cool and Waydown at the Beach Chalet (Miles Corbin Music Recordings, 2007)
- Backflip Louie and the Pool Party Pagans (Riptide Records, 2008)
- Reaching Shangri-La (Miles Corbin Music Recordings, 2008)
- Tiki Beat (Riptide Records, 2010)
- El Morocco (Riptide Records, 2015)

Singles:

- The Christmas Single (Miles Corbin Music Recordings, 2006)
- Tropic Isle (Miles Corbin Music Recordings, 2007)

Compilations:

- Hard Rock Surf (Hard Rock/Capitol Records, 1994)
- Blazing Longboards Soundtrack (Mesa Bluemoon/Atlantic, 1995)
- Cowabunga: The Surf Box (Rhino Records, 1995)
- Big Waves: 5 Decades of Surf Rock (Rhino/Starbucks, 2007)
