= Susan and the Surftones =

American surf instrumental band

Susan and the Surftones is an American surf instrumental band. The band is considered part of the “third wave” of surf-revivalist bands that formed in the 1990s.

The band was started in 1993 in Rochester, NY, by lead guitarist Susan L. Yasinski, one of the very few female lead guitarists in instrumental surf music. Influenced also by early Elvis and the Beatles, 1960s garage and 1970s punk music, their sound incorporates traditional surf with elements associated with these other genres, such as the use of the combo-organ. The band’s first recording deal was with Gee-Dee Records in Hamburg, Germany, who released their first CD, Without A Word, in 1995. Subsequent releases on Gee-Dee and two other European labels, Surf Waves (Belgium) and OmOm (Italy), and four European tours, earned them a fan base in Europe as well as the US. Susan relocated to the West Coast in 2000 and reformed the band in Portland, Oregon. They continued to release albums both on CD and as digital releases.

Nissan (Italy) used two of their tunes, their cover of Ghost Riders in the Sky and Moon Woman ‘42, in a promotional DVD in 2005. They performed a showcase at the ROCKRGRL Music Conference in Seattle in 2005 and have played halftime shows for the NBA Portland Trail Blazers. In 2007 two of their original tunes (Tiki Kiki and The Blue Hammer) were used in MTV’s The Real World: Sydney.

In addition to thirteen full-length album releases and a vinyl EP, Susan & The SurfTones appear on compilation albums released in the US, Italy, Australia, Russia, Korea and Germany. Their recordings have received airplay on numerous radio stations in the US and abroad.

In 2011, Susan recorded her first solo album, Shore, as Susan SurfTone, with producer Steve Kravac. It was released in October 2011. Critically acclaimed, Shore followed on critical listening and appreciation of such classic greats as The Doors.

Susan followed the success of Shore with the release of four more albums as Susan SurfTone, also produced by Steve Kravac, Too Far in 2013, a six-song EP, Reckoning, in 2014, a seven-song EP, Blue Light at Midnight in 2015 and a six-song EP, The Magician in 2016. 2016 saw Susan release her first vocal track, the single Little Bit Lied To, as well as other single releases, ShadowLand and Blue Moon of Kentucky (also with vocals), all from The Magician. Two more vocal singles, the original Up Down And All Around and a cover of Elvis Presley's A Mess of Blues, were released in late 2016. 2017 saw the release of a seven-song EP, Making Waves Again. In 2018, she released an EP of Elvis Presley covers, 2nd To One. Her two 2019 EP releases, Dicey After Dark and the acoustic To The Crossroads And Back, once again combined originals with cover songs. Early in 2020, Susan released her second acoustic EP, Outlaws Of The Mist. In 2020, Susan made a return to instrumental surf music with the release of the singles Baja and Blue Hammer, followed shortly by a five-track original collection titled The EP. On these recordings, Susan plays both guitar and bass, joined by LA-based drummer Nick Vincent. The 2020 surf instrumentals received repeated airplay on Bill Kelly's Blackhole Bandstand - Little Steven's Underground Garage, SiriusXM, as well as Mike Murray's "Whole Lotta Shakin'" radio show on WRUR 88.5 FM (Rochester and Ithaca, NY).

== Members ==
Susan SurfTone, aka Susan L. Yasinski, is the lead guitarist and band leader. In 2006, she also became the band’s bassist for studio recordings. Other members and session musicians have included (on bass) Dave Anderson, Buck Malen, Jim Fritz, and Dan Ferguson; (on drums) Judd Williams, Brian Goodman, Bob Becker, Matt Miner, Paul Barrall, Brian Foxworth and Nick Vincent; and (on keyboards) Kim13, and Avory Gray. In 2012, model/dancer Seana Steele became a featured member of the band as a go-go dancer. The 2013 release, Too Far features Michele "Cookie" Heile on the theremin on two tracks.

Up Down And All Around (2016) features backing vocals by Mia Moravis.

Beginning in 2020 with the release of "Baja", L.A.-based drummer Nick Vincent has played drums on Susan's releases.

== Albums ==
- Without a Word (1995) Gee-Dee Music (Germany)
- Thunderbeach (1996) Gee-Dee Music (Germany)
- Bitchin' (1999) Gee-Dee Music (Germany)
- This Ain’t No Beach Party (1999) Surf Waves (Belgium) (four-song vinyl EP)
- All The Beat, All The Best - Live (2000) Surf Waves (Belgium)
- The Originals (2001) Acme Brothers Records (USA)
- Wrap-Around (2002) OmOm Music (Italy)
- Night In Old Town (2004) Acme Brothers Records (USA)
- Fluid Drive (2006) Acme Brothers Records (USA) Digital-only release
- There She Goes Again - S&ST Play The VU (2007) Acme Brothers Records (USA) Limited release.
- Untitled No. 10 (2007) Acme Brothers Records (USA) [Digital-only release]
- S&ST Play the Beatles Vol. 2 - The Dear Prudence Sessions (2009) Acme Brothers Records (USA)
- PDX A Go-Go - Making Waves Up North (compilation)tracks: Rock Candy; Salt Water (2012) Acme Brothers Records (USA)

As Susan SurfTone:

- Shore (2011) Acme Brothers Records (USA)
- Too Far (2013) Acme Brothers Records (USA)
- Reckoning (2014) Acme Brothers Records (USA)
- Blue Light at Midnight (2015) Acme Brothers Records (USA)
- Little Bit Lied To (single) (2016) Acme Brothers Records (USA)
- ShadowLand (single) (2016) Acme Brothers Records (USA)
- Blue Moon of Kentucky (single) (2016) Acme Brothers Records (USA)
- The Magician (2016) Acme Brothers Records (USA)
- Making Waves Again (2017) Acme Brothers Records (USA)
- Up Down And All Around (single) (2016) Acme Brothers Records (USA)
- Gnarly Wave Vol 1 (compilation) track: Green Light (2016) Bongo Boy Records (USA)
- Out of the Garage Vol 2 (compilation) track: Little Bit Lied To (2016) Bongo Boy Records (USA)
- A Mess of Blues (single) (2016) Acme Brothers Records (USA)
- Out of the Garage Vol 3 (compilation) tracks: Up, Down And All Around and Bottom Of My Glass (2017) Bongo Boy Records (USA)
- Gnarly Wave Vol 2 (compilation) tracks: Subduction and Mint471 (2017) Bongo Boy Records (USA)
- Love Is Vol 1(compilation) track: Out Of My Dreams (2017) Bongo Boy Records (USA)
- 2nd To One (2018) Acme Brothers Records (USA)
- Backroom Blues Vol 6 (compilation) track: Blue Guitar (2018) Bongo Boy Records (USA)
- Love Is Vol 2 (compilation) track: If I Knock (2018) Bongo Boy Records (USA)
- Out of the Garage Vol 4 (compilation) track: Temptation (2018) Bongo Boy Records (USA)
- Gnarly Wave Vol 3 (compilation) track: Vortex '59 (2018) Bongo Boy Records (USA)
- Backroom Blues Vol 7 (compilation) track: Reconsider Baby (2018) Bongo Boy Records (USA)
- Bongo Boy Records Vol XVI (compilation) track: Buckle Up (2019) Bongo Boy Records (USA)
- Dicey After Dark (2019) Acme Brothers Records (USA)
- Backroom Blues Vol 8 (compilation) track: What A Shame (2019) Bongo Boy Records (USA)
- To The Crossroads And Back (2019) Acme Brothers Records (USA)
- Outlaws of the Mist (2020) Acme Brothers Records (USA)
- Backroom Blues Vol 9 (compilation) track: Ambuscade (2020) Bongo Boy Records (USA)
- Baja (single) (2020) Acme Brothers Records (USA)
- Blue Hammer (2020) (single) (2020) Acme Brothers Records (USA)
- The EP (EP) (2020) Acme Brothers Records (USA)
- Diamond Head (single) (2021) Acme Brothers Records (USA)
- Secret Agent Man (single) (2021) Acme Brothers Records (USA)
- The Lonely Bull (single) (2021) Acme Brothers Records (USA)
- No Particular Place To Go (single) (2021) Acme Brothers Records (USA)
- SkinWalker (single) (2021) Acme Brothers Records (USA)
- Sneaker Wave (single) (2021) Acme Brothers Records (USA)
- Out Of Limits (single) (2021) Acme Brothers Records (USA)
- Those Magic Changes (single) (2022) Acme Brothers Records (USA)
- Hawaii Five-O (single) (2022) Acme Brothers Records (USA)
- Beatle Roots (2022) Acme Brothers Records (USA)
- Let's Twist Again (2022) Acme Brothers Records (USA)
- Whisper Of The Devil (2022) Acme Brothers Records (USA)
- Roll Over Beethoven (single) (2023) Acme Brothers Records (USA)
- Wild Weekend (single) (2023) Acme Brothers Records (USA)
- Up The Coast (2023) Acme Brothers Records (USA)
- Nobody In The Real World (2023) Acme Brothers Records (USA)
- Beatle Roots II (2024) Acme Brothers Records (USA)

== Tours ==
- April 1996 - Germany
- February 1997 - Germany
- January / February 2000 - Germany, Denmark, Austria, Netherlands, Belgium, Switzerland, France
- January / February 2001 - Germany, Denmark, Switzerland, Belgium
- February 2012 - Oregon and California
- September 2012 - Oregon and California
