= The Witch Queen of New Orleans =

1971 single by Redbone

Single by Redbone

from the album Message from a Drum
- B-side: "Chant: 13th Hour"
- Released: May 17, 1971
- Genre: Swamp rock
- Length: 2:45
- Label: Epic
- Songwriters: Lolly Vegas; Pat Vegas
- Producers: Lolly Vegas; Pat Vegas

Redbone singles chronology
"Light as a Feather" (1971)	"The Witch Queen of New Orleans" (1971)	"Niji Trance" (1972)

Official audio
- "The Witch Queen of New Orleans" on YouTube

"The Witch Queen of New Orleans" is a 1971 song by American rock band Redbone. It was released as a single in May 1971 from the band's third album Message from a Drum, which is also titled The Witch Queen of New Orleans in its European release. The song peaked at No. 2 in the United Kingdom and No. 21 in the United States.

== Background ==
"The Witch Queen of New Orleans" is about a 19th-century practitioner of voodoo from New Orleans named Marie Laveau, referred to in the song lyrics as "Marie la Voodoo veau". This song was written by the two Mexican-Native American brothers of the group Redbone, Lolly Vegas and Pat Vegas. It shows influences from New Orleans R&B and swamp pop. Bassist Pat Vagas sings the lead vocal.

The song was released in 1971 with "Chant: 13th Hour" as the B-side in the US. It debuted in the Billboard Hot 100 chart in November 1971 in the US where it reach a peak of No. 21 in 1972 (chart date February 19, 1972). The song reached No. 2 in the UK single chart in October 1971 behind Rod Stewart's "Maggie May".

== Track listings ==
U.S. 7-inch single – Epic 5-10749
European 7-inch single – Epic EPC 7351

1. "The Witch Queen Of New Orleans" – 2:45
2. "Chant: 13th Hour" (Single version) – 2:59

Japan 7-inch single – Epic ECPA-3

1. "The Witch Queen Of New Orleans" – 2:45
2. "Chant: 13th Hour" (Album version) – 5:40

== Charts ==
=== Weekly charts ===
Chart (1971–1972)	Peak position
Australia (Kent Music Report)	17
Australia (Go-Set National Top 40)	14
Belgium (Ultratop 50 Flanders)	1
Canada Top Singles (RPM)	15
France (IFOP)	23
Germany (GfK)	13
Ireland (IRMA)	7
Netherlands (Dutch Top 40)	7
Netherlands (Single Top 100)	5
New Zealand (Listener)	12
Norway (VG-lista)	6
UK Singles (Official Charts)	2
US Billboard Hot 100	21
US Cash Box	19

=== Year-end charts ===
Chart (1971)	Rank
Belgium (Ultratop 50 Flanders)	37
Netherlands (Dutch Top 40)	41
Netherlands (Single Top 100)	34

Chart (1972)	Rank
Australia (Kent Music Report)	95
Belgium (Ultratop 50 Flanders)	96
US Billboard Hot 100	81

== Chantoozies version ==
"Witch Queen"
- 7" single cover

Single by Chantoozies

from the album Chantoozies
- B-side: "The Chantoozie Shuffle"
- Released: January 12, 1987
- Studio: Platinum Studios, Melbourne
- Genre: Pop
- Length: 4:09
- Label: Mushroom
- Songwriters: Lolly Vegas; Pat Vegas
- Producer: David Courtney

Chantoozies singles chronology
"Witch Queen" (1987)	"He's Gonna Step on You Again" (1987)

Music video
- "Witch Queen" on YouTube

Australian pop group the Chantoozies released a version of the song in 1987 as their debut single, retitled "Witch Queen". The song peaked at number 4 on the Australian Kent Music Report and was featured on their self-titled debut album the following year.

=== Track listings ===
7" single (K 208)

- Side A "Witch Queen"
- Side B "The Chantoozie Shuffle"

12" single ( X 14459)

- Side A "Witch Queen" (12" version)
- Side B1 "Witch Queen" (7" version)
- Side B2 "The Chantoozie Shuffle"

=== Charts ===
==== Weekly charts ====
Chart (1987)	Peak position
Australia (Kent Music Report)	4

=== Year-end charts ===
Chart (1987)	Position
Australia (Kent Music Report)	49

== In popular culture ==
Artist Howard Arkley produced a series of sketches in the early 1970s referencing popular songs, one of which is titled "Which Queen" as a reference to this song.

Redbone's recording is commonly played during Halloween in the United States.
