= Redbone (band) =

American rock band

- Redbone in 1977: Plato T. Jones, Pat Vegas, Jack White, Lolly Vegas, Jeff Silverman

Background information
- Origin: Los Angeles, California, U.S.
- Genres: Rock
- Years active: 1969–1977; 1992 (Note: This was a one-time reunion playing live at Topanga Canyon.); 1997–present
- Labels: Epic; Novalene
- Spinoff of: Pat and Lolly Vegas
- Members: Pat Vegas
- Past members: Lolly Vegas; Tony Bellamy; Peter DePoe; Butch Rillera; Arturo Perez; Aloisio Aguilar

Redbone is an American rock band that was originally formed in Los Angeles, California, in 1969 by brothers Pat and Lolly Vegas. All members during their commercial peak were of Chicano or Native American heritage, something heavily reflected in their songs, stage regalia, and album art.

Their released albums consist of Redbone (1970), Potlatch (1970), The Witch Queen of New Orleans (1971), Already Here (1972), Wovoka (1973), Beaded Dreams Through Turquoise Eyes (1974), Soliloquy in Red (1975), Cycles (1977), and Peace Pipe (2005).

They made the Billboard Hot 100 in the spring of 1974 with "Come and Get Your Love". The single was certified gold, selling over a million copies. Redbone became the first Native American band to have such success, with the song reaching number 5. Redbone got additional notice in America with the singles "We Were All Wounded at Wounded Knee", "The Witch Queen of New Orleans", "Wovoka", and "Maggie", although these were more successful overseas.

Pat has been the sole consistent member of the band since Lolly's death in 2010.

== History ==
Brothers Patrick “Pat” Vegas (bass, vocals) and Candido "Lolly" Vasquez-Vegas (guitar, vocals) were born in Coalinga, California, near Fresno. In 1959, they moved to Los Angeles, where they spent a decade performing in clubs as Pat and Lolly Vegas. During this period, they performed in local clubs on Hollywood and Sunset Boulevard, including Gazzari's, while also writing and playing on records for various artists including Tina Turner, Sonny & Cher, James Brown, The Ventures, Little Richard, and Elvis.

Pat Vegas had earlier won Coca-Cola's first singing competition in 1958 at age 17, earning a recording contract, which he postponed in order to move to Los Angeles with his brother Lolly.

In the early 1960s, the duo performed under several names, including the Vegas Brothers and the Crazy Cajun Cakewalk Band. Moreover, before forming Redbone, Pat and Lolly Released an album in October 1965 entitled Pat & Lolly Vegas at the Haunted House (Mercury MG 21059/SR 61059). Of the twelve songs on the album, six were originals by the Vasquez-Vegas brothers which earned them some early success. Pat and Lolly also appeared on the mid-'60s hit show Shindig! repeatedly, becoming regular performers. They also released several singles from 1961 to the mid-1960s, one titled "Robot Walk" / "Don't You Remember" (Apogee Records A-101), helping to make a name for themselves in their early years.

In 1967, P.J. Proby recorded "Niki Hoeky", which was co-written by Jim Ford, Lolly Vegas, and Pat Vegas. This song became his only Top 30 hit. The following year, Bobbie Gentry performed the Cajun-influenced song on The Smothers Brothers Comedy Hour and included it on her smash-hit album, Ode to Billie Joe. Pat Vegas also wrote songs for other artists such as Aretha Franklin.

According to Pat Vegas, Jimi Hendrix inspired the musicians to form an all-Native American rock group. They signed as 'Redbone' to Epic Records in 1969. The band consisted of Pat Vegas, Lolly Vegas, Peter DePoe (Siletz) and Robert Anthony Avila, a Yaqui-Mexican American, better known by his stage name Tony Bellamy. Their debut album Redbone was released in 1970.They made the Billboard Hot 100 in the spring of 1974 with "Come and Get Your Love". The single was certified gold, selling over a million copies. With this achievement Redbone became the first Native American band to have such success, with the song reaching number 5.

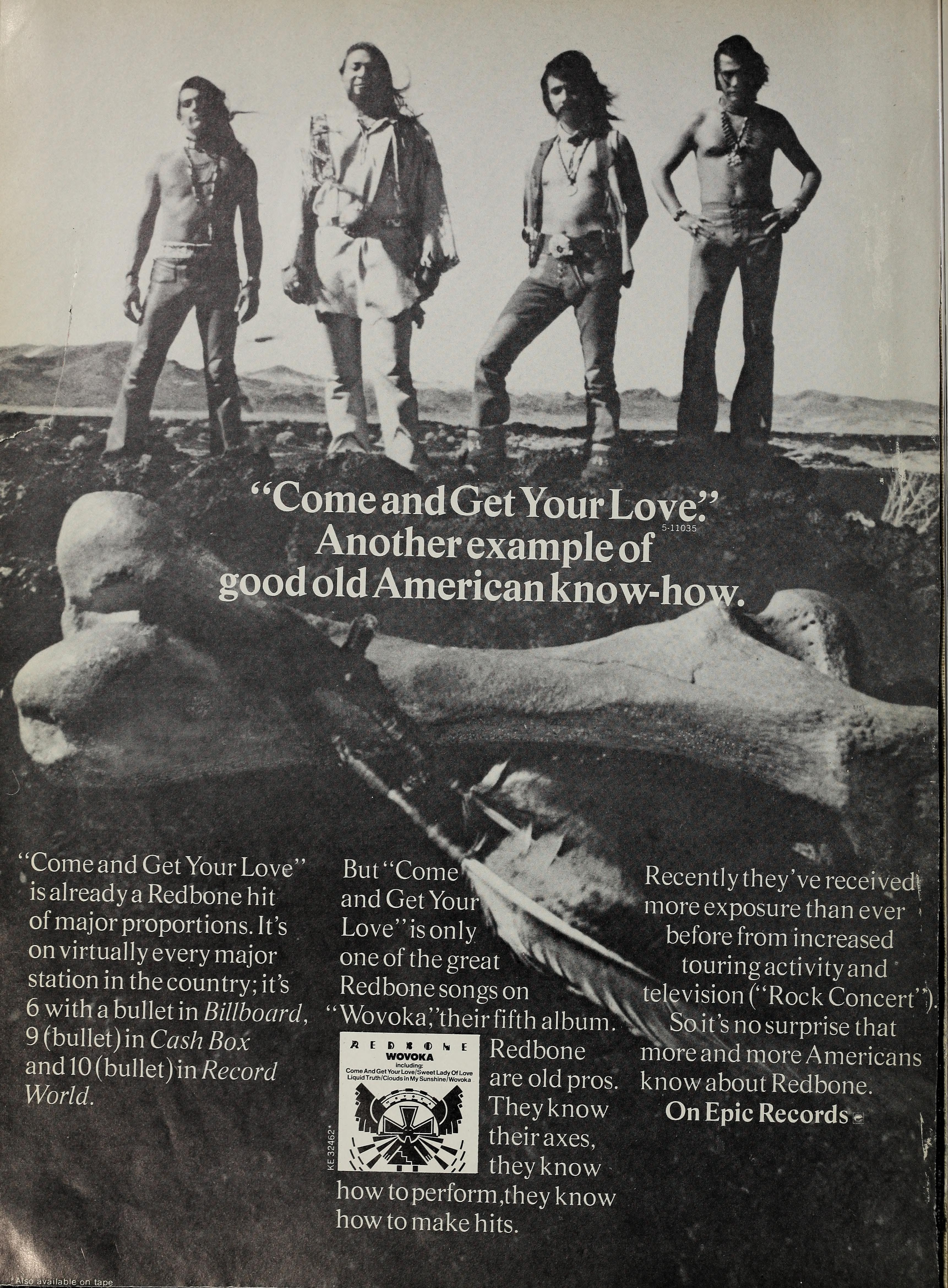
Cashbox advertisement, April 6, 1974

Redbone’s music blended rock music with R&B, Cajun, blue-eyed soul, funk, country, tribal, and Latin influences. Their first major world success came with the single "The Witch Queen of New Orleans" (from Message from a Drum) that peaked at No. 21 on the Billboard Hot 100, and followed by the single "Maggie" from their second album, Potlatch.

In the spring of 1974, the band made the Billboard Hot 100 with "Come and Get Your Love" . The single was rated certified gold by the R.I.A.A. on April 22, 1974. Over a million copies of the song were sold, and the No. 5 hit for Redbone remained on the charts for 24 weeks.

Redbone was also the opening act introducing the first Earth Day to the world in Philadelphia along with Senator Edmund Muskie. Their opening song was "Chant 13th Hour" from the Potlatch album.

Redbone's music was characterized by the Leslie rotating speaker effect that Lolly Vegas used for his electric guitar amplifier and a "King Kong" style of drumming developed by drummer Peter DePoe. This Leslie effect was developed while rehearsing at Dress Revue Sound Studios in Hollywood, California, in the early 1970s. The Leslie rotating speaker was originally designed to be used with electric organ and was used previously by the Beatles on vocals ("Tomorrow Never Knows") and guitar. "Come and Get Your Love" also featured Lolly on Electric Sitar, which contributed to the unique sound of the track.

The first self-titled album by Redbone was released as a double album in North America. In Europe, it was released both as a double (EPC 67242) and as a single album (BN 26280) on the Epic label.

Their third album, Message from a Drum, was released in Europe (except Spain) with the title The Witch Queen of New Orleans and a different cover than the one released in the U.S. and Canada.

In 1973, Redbone released the politically oriented "We Were All Wounded at Wounded Knee", recalling both the massacre of Lakota Sioux Indians by the 7th Cavalry Regiment in 1890 and the 71-day Wounded Knee Occupation that occurred a few months before the song's release. The song ends with the subtly altered sentence "We were all wounded 'by' Wounded Knee". It charted in several European countries and reached the No. 1 position in the Netherlands but did not chart in the U.S., where it was initially withheld from release due to lyrical controversy and then banned by several radio stations due to its direct lyrical confrontation of the massacre.

DePoe had left this band in 1972. He was replaced by Arturo Perez (1939- ), but later by Bellamy's Filipino-Chicano/Seneca cousin, Butch Rillera around that point. Following this the band achieved much of their commercial success. Tony Bellamy (guitar, piano and vocals) left the band in 1977, with Rillera leaving shortly after.

== Present day ==
The band's current remaining membership is led by Pat Vegas. After Lolly Vegas suffered from a stroke that prevented him from touring, the band continued with rotating members under Pat’s leadership. None of the rotating members have been official.

There was a proposed reunion tour in 2003, however it did not occur. There is evidence that suggests the existence of an "imposter band" that was illegally touring the United States and posing as Redbone under the name "Denny Freeman". Denny Freeman — who Pat Vegas confirmed to be unaffiliated with Redbone in an interview with the Montana Standard — defrauded the county fair board of the Butte Silver-Bow County Fair in Butte, Montana, under pretenses of being a co-founding member of Redbone, yet he was never a band member.

Redbone later headlined the Inaugural Indigenous Peoples Day event at Los Angeles City Hall on October 8, 2018, in Grand Park. The band performed alongside Pat Vegas's son, PJ Vegas, and The Black Eyed Peas. This was the first indigenous celebration that commemorated the pivotal switch from Columbus Day to Indigenous Peoples’ Day to honor Native American history and culture. Spearheaded by LA Council member Mitch O'Farrell, they honored the largest native community in the United States, Los Angeles, and the native people who first inhabited LA, the Tongva people.

Pat Vegas continues to tour in the United States and Canada in support of his solo albums, "Speed of Sound" (as Ambergris), "Peacepipe" (as Redbone), "Buffalo Bluz", and "Pow Wow Man" (as Pat Redbone Vegas). He also is part of a touring version of Redbone that plays both his solo efforts and hits from the band.

== Cultural relevance ==
The word "redbone" is a Louisiana term for a mixed-race person, which the band adopted to signify their mixed ancestry. The Vasquez-Vegas brothers were of Yaqui, Shoshone, and Mexican heritage. The band often alluded to Cajun and New Orleans culture in their lyrics and performing style. The brothers began by performing and recording surf music as the Vegas Brothers, "because their agent told them that the world was not yet ready to embrace a duo of Mexican musicians playing surfing music".

At a time when Indigenous people were largely misrepresented or ignored in popular culture, Redbone proudly embraced their heritage and used their platform to highlight Native identity and political issues. They challenged stereotypes, supported Indigenous rights movements, and showed that Native artists could succeed in the commercial music industry without hiding who they were. This mattered for media representation because Redbone’s existence, image, and sound challenged the narrow way Native Americans were usually shown in media entertainment, and it helped open space for indigenous identity within rock coverage and pop culture discussion.

== Deaths ==
On December 25, 2009, Tony Bellamy died of liver failure at a hospital in his hometown of Las Vegas, at age 63. Less than three months later, Lolly Vegas died of lung cancer at his family home in Reseda, California, on March 4, 2010, at age 70.

Butch Rillera (born Laurence Steven Rillera on October 8, 1945) died on February 2, 2024 aged 78, and his death was announced three days later.

== Musical style and influences ==
Redbone's music was primarily rock music, but incorporated elements of rock and roll, funk, folk music, blues, swamp funk, Tex-Mex, rhythm and blues, indigenous music of North America, soul music, soft rock, hard rock, Cajun music, jazz and Latin music. The band's style was classified as swamp rock.

== Awards and accolades ==
Redbone was inducted into the Native American Music Association Hall of Fame in 2008, as well as the NY Smithsonian in 2013. They were also honored with vein painted on the largest mural in the U.S. in Fresno, California. On August 30, 2014, Pat Vegas was honored with the Lifetime Achievement "Legend" Award from the West Coast American Indian Music Awards

In 2014, "Come and Get Your Love" experienced a resurgence in popularity when it was featured in the Marvel Studios film Guardians of the Galaxy as one of the songs on a mixtape made for the protagonist, Peter Quill. It was also included on the film's soundtrack album, which reached the top spot on the Billboard 200 chart. It later appeared in the film's second sequel, Guardians of the Galaxy Vol. 3, released in 2023.

In 2015, "Come and Get Your Love" was used as the intro theme to Netflix produced cartoon series F is for Family.

In 2017, "One More Time" was featured in the American drama film, Person to Person.

In 2018, Pat Vegas was awarded with the "Lifetime Achievement Award" from the Indigenous Music Awards.

== Band members ==
=== Current ===
- Pat Vegas – bass, vocals, percussion (1969–1977, 1997–present)

=== Former ===
- Lolly Vegas – guitars, vocals (1969–1977, 1997; died 2010)
- Tony Bellamy – guitars, vocals (1969–1977, 1997–1998, 2008; (Note: Reunited with the band for a performance at Redbone's induction into the Native American Music Association Hall of Fame at the Native American Music Awards on October 4, 2008) died 2009)
- Peter DePoe – drums, percussion, backing vocals (1969–1972)
- Arturo Perez – drums, recorded on their album Already Here (1972)
- Butch Rillera – drums, percussion, backing vocals (1973–1977; died 2024)
- Aloisio Aguilar – keyboards, percussion joined the band on their albums Cycles (1977) and Live (1994)
- Eddie Summers - drums on Live (1994)

== Discography ==
- Redbone (1970)
- Potlatch (1970)
- Message from a Drum (1971)
- Already Here (1972)
- Wovoka (1973)
- Beaded Dreams Through Turquoise Eyes (1974)
- Cycles (1977)
- Peace Pipe (2005)
