= Peter DePoe =

American musician (born 1943)

- Also known as: Last Walking Bear
- Born: August 21, 1943 (age 83); Neah Bay, Washington, U.S.
- Genres: Rock, pop
- Occupations: Musician, drummer
- Instruments: Drums
- Formerly of: Redbone

Peter DePoe (born August 21, 1943), also known as Last Walking Bear, is an American rock musician who was the drummer for the Native American band Redbone. He first played with Jimi Hendrix in Seattle's local taverns as a young man and moved to California and became Redbone's drummer in 1969.

== Background ==
Born in Neah Bay, Washington in 1943, Peter DePoe is a citizen of the Confederated Tribes of Siletz Indians of Oregon and a descendant of the Southern Cheyenne and Turtle Mountain Chippewa. DePoe is also of French and German descent.

== Musical career ==
He was credited with developing a style of drumming known as "King Kong", later copied by other drummers for its versatile and funk-oriented rhythms. In an interview with Drumeo, Tower of Power's David Garibaldi described the "King Kong Beat" as one of the most important and influential rhythms incorporated into his drumming style.

In early 1972, he left the group. The band replaced him with Arturo Perez, and then with Redbone bandmate Tony Bellamy's cousin Butch Rillera.

DePoe has since played drums for several Washington-area bands, including Paco, a trio that was active from 1977-1979 and produced select recordings with Kearney Barton's Seattle-based audio production company, Topaz Records.

== Discography ==
- Ron Buford - Deep Soul Pt. 1 & 2 - Camelot Studios - 1962
- Mr. Clean and the Cleansers - 1964
- Jimmy McCracklin - The Stinger Man (LP, Album) Minit LP-24017 1969
- Redbone - Potlatch Epic 1970
- Redbone - Redbone Epic 1970
- Redbone - Message From A Drum Epic 1971
- Power (Prelude To A Means) (as Peter O. DePoe)
- Redbone - Already Here (LP, Album) Epic, Epic, Epic EPC 65072, S EPC 65072, KE 31598 1972
- Trafton - Traffic Jam (CD, Album) Rose Records (2), Rose Records (2) #208, ROSE208 1990
- Take It Easy Various - WTNG 89.9 FM: Solid Bronze (LP, Comp, Ltd) Numero Group, Numbero NBR-002 2012
- Bobby Womack - Across 110th Street - EMI- 1972
- Redbone - Wovoka Epic 1973
- Redbone - Come And Get Your Redbone / The Best Of Redbone Epic 1975
- Jimmy Ford - Harlan County (Sundown/White Whale Records JHS-1002), 1969
- Brenda Patterson - Keep On Keepin On 1970 - Epic Records

Writing & Arrangement:

- Things Go Better... (as P. DePoe)
- 23rd And Mad (as P. DePoe)
- Intro for Chant 13th Hour - Redbone
- Cisco's Ride Home (as P. DePoe)
