= Pat Vegas =

American musician

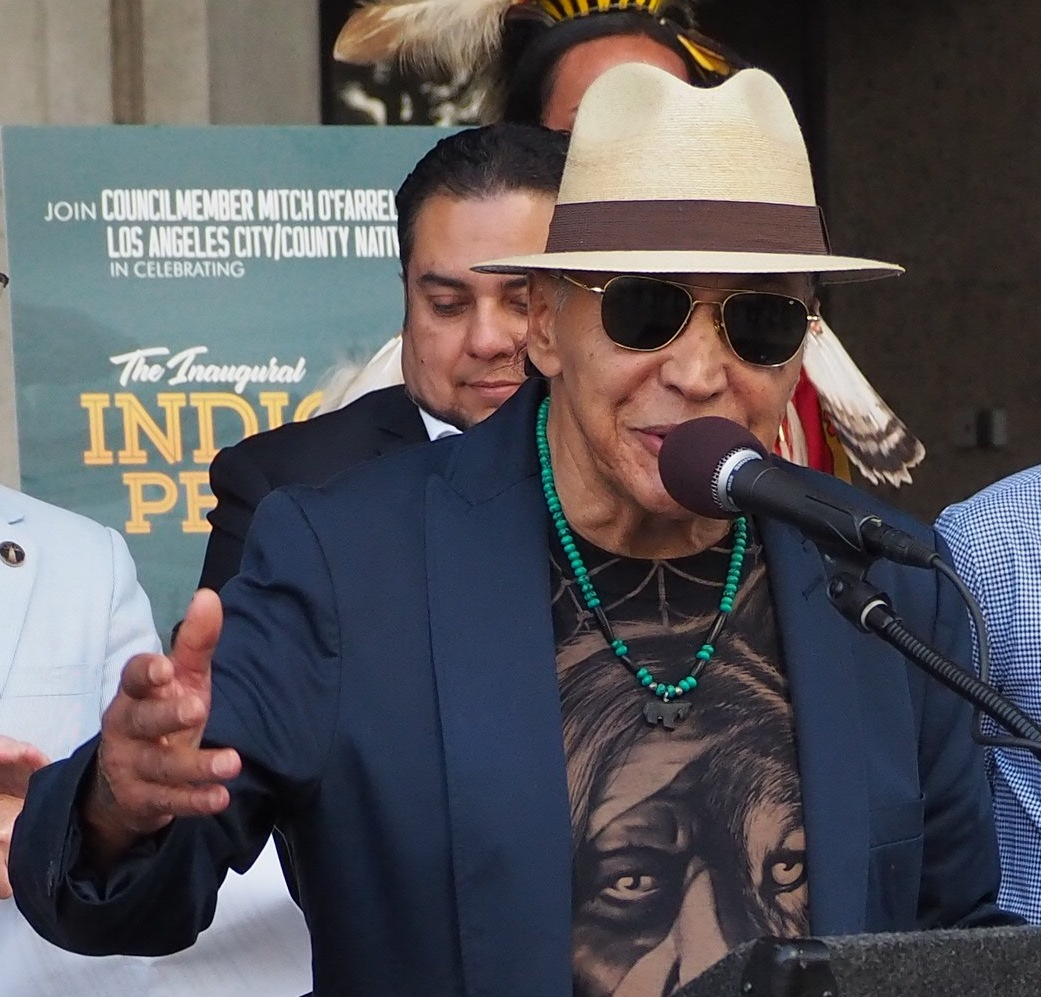
- Vegas speaks in favor of Indigenous Peoples Day in Los Angeles in 2018

Background information
- Born: Patrick Morales Vasquez-Vegas; March 17, 1941 (age 85); Coalinga, California, U.S.
- Origin: Fresno, California, U.S.
- Occupation: Musician
- Instruments: Bass guitar, vocals, drums, percussion
- Years active: 1961–present
- Member of: Redbone
- Formerly of: The Sharks, The Avantis, Pat & Lolly Vegas

Patrick Vasquez-Vegas (born March 17, 1941) is an American musician who is a vocalist, writer, and producer of Redbone, known for their hit singles "Come and Get Your Love", "The Witch Queen of New Orleans", "Maggie", and "We Were All Wounded at Wounded Knee". He has played in numerous ensembles which include Pat and Lolly Vegas, The Avantis, and Redbone. Vegas, along with his Redbone bandmates, was featured in the Smithsonian National Museum of the American Indian for being the first rock/Cajun group of Native American ancestry to have a No. 1 single.

== Background ==
Pat Vegas was born in Coalinga, California. He was originally known as Patrick Vasquez-Vegas. Both Pat and his brother Candido "Lolly" Vasquez-Vegas played in local bands. They changed their name to Vegas when they came to Los Angeles in 1960 to work as musicians. Vegas started out as a member of the Shindig house band. Later he performed with his brother Lolly as The Vegas Brothers. After that they formed the group Redbone which had the 1974 hit, "Come and Get Your Love".

== Career ==
In 1961, Vegas released a single, "I Wanna Be A Movie Star". The following year, "That Smile" b/w "The Best Girl in the World" was released on the Unity label.

Pat and Lolly led a band called The Avantis. The line-up included drummer Mike Kowalski and guitarist Danny Hamilton. They became a support act for the Beach Boys. The Avantis worked closely with Judd Hamilton (Older brother of Dan Hamilton) who was the arranger and co-composer on their records. In 1963, they had a minor hit with "Wax 'Em Down". On October 12, 1963, the record reached 36 in the Canadian charts.

In 1969, along with his brother Lolly, rhythm guitarist Tony Bellamy and drummer Pete DePoe, he formed the band Redbone, which produced the commercially successful singles "Maggie", "The Witch Queen of New Orleans" and "Come And Get Your Love".

== Later years ==
Vegas was featured in the 2017 film Rumble: The Indians Who Rocked the World, a documentary that explores the influence that Native Americans had on rock music.

In April 2018, CBC Music announced that Vegas as well as Ansley Simpson and Indian City were to perform at the CBC Indigenous Music Awards in Winnipeg in May.

Vegas was the recipient of a Lifetime Achievement Award for his work in Redbone.

== Solo discography ==
=== Albums ===
- Speed of Sound (2013)
  (as "Ambergris")

=== Singles ===
Title	Label and cat	Year	Notes #
"I Wanna Be A Movie Star" // "I've Traveled The Whole Wide World"	Lute L-6014	1961	
"That Smile" // "The Best Girl in the World"	Unity CP-2113	1962	
"The Giggler" // "Green Tomatoes" (as 'Pat & The Wildcats')	Crusader C-100	1964	
