= Lolly Vegas =

American musician (1939–2010)

- Born: Candido Albelando Vasquez-Vegas; October 2, 1939; Coalinga, California, U.S.
- Origin: Fresno, California, U.S.
- Died: March 4, 2010 (aged 70) Los Angeles, California, U.S.
- Genres: Rock; soul; country rock; funk rock; R&B; Cajun; traditional
- Occupation: Musician
- Instruments: Guitar; vocals
- Years active: 1960s–2000s
- Labels: Chancellor; Regency; Epic; Novalene
- Formerly of: The Avantis; Pat & Lolly Vegas; Redbone

Candido Albelando "Lolly" Vasquez-Vegas (October 2, 1939 – March 4, 2010) was an American musician. He played in numerous ensembles with his brother Pat, including Pat & Lolly Vegas, The Avantis, and Redbone.

== Background ==
Candido Albelando Vasquez-Vegas was born in Fresno, California. He and his brother, Pat played in bands around the Fresno area. They shortened their last name to Vegas when they relocated to Los Angeles in 1963 to pursue their musical career.

The brothers performed as the Vegas Brothers before changing the name of their group to Redbone. Their 1974 hit "Come and Get Your Love" charted at No. 5 in the U.S.

== Career ==
Before the world knew him as Lolly Vegas of the 1970s band Redbone, Lolly Vasquez, with brother Pat and friend Robert Howard, played the Salinas club circuit in the 1950's. With his brother and Howard, they formed the High Tensions band. Lolly Vasquez played lead guitar while his brother played mostly bass and drums. Together with brother Pat, Lolly led a band called The Avantis. The ensemble also consisted of drummer Mike Kowalski and guitarist Danny Hamilton. They became a support act for the Beach Boys. The Avantis did some work with Judd Hamilton (older brother of Dan Hamilton) who was the arranger and co-composer on their records. In 1963 The Avantis had a minor hit with "Wax 'Em Down". The single was distributed in Canada by Sparton of Canada Ltd where it made the charts. On October 12, 1963, Canada's C-FUNTASTIC FIFTY recorded the single's chart status as having moved up one notch from the previous week's position of 37 to 36, putting it right behind "Fools Rush In" by Rick Nelson.

Vegas co-wrote the Rick Lancelot & The Peppermint Sticks single "Sick Chick" / "Ain't That Soul" which was released in 1964. Rick Lancelot was in fact Ricky Lancelotti. Vegas also wrote "Love Will Make You Crawl" for Cliff Wagner which was the B-side to his 1966 single, "Exception to the Rule".

In 1969, along with his brother Pat, rhythm guitarist Tony Bellamy and drummer Pete DePoe he formed the band Redbone, for which he was the lead singer. The band produced the singles "Maggie", "The Witch Queen of New Orleans", and their biggest hit "Come and Get Your Love".

== Death ==
Vegas died of lung cancer in the Reseda neighborhood of Los Angeles on March 4, 2010, at age 70. He had been in poor health after suffering a stroke 15 years earlier. He was cremated after his funeral service at Lisle Funeral Home in Fresno. His urn was buried at Fresno Memorial Gardens within its Garden of Guadalupe section afterwards.

== Solo discography ==
List of recordings as solo/lead act
Act	Title	Label and cat	Year	Ref
Lolly Vegas with the Downbeats	"I'm Gonna Say We're Thru" // "It's Love"	Audio A-202	1960	
