= Bless the Beasts and Children =

Bless the Beasts and Children may refer to:

- Bless the Beasts and Children (novel), a 1970 novel by Glendon Swarthout
- Bless the Beasts and Children (film), the 1971 film adaptation directed by Stanley Kramer and starring Bill Mumy
- Bless the Beasts and Children (soundtrack), the soundtrack to the film
- "Bless the Beasts and Children" (song), the theme song to the film performed by the Carpenters
