= September 23 =

September 23 this year in various calendars
- Wednesday, 23 September 2026
Akan	Kuruwukuo
Armenian	5 Sahmi 1476
Aztec	Tititl 16, 10 Cuetzpalin
Babylonian	10 Ululu, 2337 SE
Balinese pawukon	Menga, Pasah, Laba, Pon, Paniron, Buda of Bala, Indra, Urungan, Sri
Bengali	8 Ashshin, BS 1433
Chinese	Yang Metal Rat・Winnowing Basket Mansion; Fire Horse Year, Month 8, Day 13 (Qiufen, 15 days until Hanlu)
Common Era	23 September 2026 CE
Coptic	13 Thout, AM 1743
Egyptian	10 Mechir, 2775 NE
Ethiopian	13 Maskaram, 2019 Amätä Məhrät
French Republican	Décade I, Primidi de Vendémiaire de l'Année 235 de la République
Gregorian	23 September, AD 2026
Hebrew	12 Tishrei, AM 5787
Hindu	Śravaṇa・Sukarman; Solar: 7 Āśvina, 1948 SE; Lunisolar: Dvādaśī, Śukla pakṣa of Bhādrapada, 2083 VE; Rāudra・5127 KY・1,872,841
Icelandic	Miðvikudagur, 30 Tvímánuður 2026
Islamic	10 Rabi' al-thani, AH 1448 (using tabular method)
ISO week date	2026-W39-3
Japanese	13 Hazuki, Reiwa 8 (Shūbun, 15 days until Kanro)
Julian	10 September, AD 2026 (AM 7534)
Julian day	2461307
Korean	13 Dakdal, 4359 DE
Maya	13.0.13.17.4; 17 Chen, 10 Kan
Roman	ante diem IV Idus Septembres, MMDCCLXXIX AUC
Solar Hijri	1 Mehr, SH 1405
Tibetan	12 khrums, me pho rta 2153 or 1772 or 1000

<<	September					>>
Su	Mo	Tu	We	Th	Fr	Sa
		1	2	3	4	5
6	7	8	9	10	11	12
13	14	15	16	17	18	19
20	21	22	23	24	25	26
27	28	29	30
2026

September 23 in recent years
2026 (Wednesday)
2025 (Tuesday)
2024 (Monday)
2023 (Saturday)
2022 (Friday)
2021 (Thursday)
2020 (Wednesday)
2019 (Monday)
2018 (Sunday)
2017 (Saturday)

September 23 is the 266th day of the year (267th in leap years) in the Gregorian calendar; 99 days remain until the end of the year.

== Events ==
=== Pre-1600 ===
- 38 – Drusilla, Caligula's sister who died in June, with whom the emperor is said to have an incestuous relationship, is deified.
- 1122 – Pope Callixtus II and Holy Roman Emperor Henry V agree to the Concordat of Worms to put an end to the Investiture Controversy.
- 1338 – The Battle of Arnemuiden, in which a French force defeats the English, is the first naval battle of the Hundred Years' War and the first European naval battle in which gunpowder artillery is used.
- 1409 – The Battle of Kherlen is the second significant victory over Ming dynasty China by the Mongols since 1368.
- 1459 – The Battle of Blore Heath, the first major battle of the English Wars of the Roses, is won by the Yorkists.
- 1561 – King Philip II of Spain issues cedula, ordering a halt to colonizing efforts in Florida.

=== 1601–1900 ===
- 1642 – First English Civil War: The Battle of Powick Bridge, the first engagement between the primary field armies of the Royalists and the Parliamentarians, ends in a Royalist victory.
- 1723 – The treaty of Saint Petersburg is signed, in which Imperial Russia gains Derbent, Baku, and the coastal areas in between as well as the provinces of Gilan, Mazandaran, and Astrabad from Safavid Persia while the Shah receives Russian soldiers for domestic peacekeeping.
- 1779 – American Revolutionary War: John Paul Jones, naval commander of the United States, on board the USS Bonhomme Richard, wins the Battle of Flamborough Head.
- 1803 – Second Anglo-Maratha War: The Battle of Assaye is fought between the British East India Company and the Maratha Empire in India.
- 1821 – Tripolitsa, Greece, is captured by Greek rebels during the Greek War of Independence.
- 1846 – Astronomers Urbain Le Verrier, John Couch Adams and Johann Gottfried Galle collaborate on the discovery of Neptune.
- 1868 – The Grito de Lares occurs in Puerto Rico against Spanish rule.
- 1879 – The Macedo-Romanian Cultural Society is founded.
- 1884 – On the night of 23–24 September, the steamship Arctique runs aground near Cape Virgenes leading to the discovery of nearby placer gold, beginning the Tierra del Fuego gold rush.
- 1885 – Ethiopian forces under Ras Alula defeat Mahdist Sudanese forces in the battle of Kufit.
- 1899 – Philippine-American War: the American Asiatic Squadron destroys a Filipino battery at the Battle of Olongapo.

=== 1901–present ===
- 1905 – Norway and Sweden sign the Karlstad Treaty, peacefully dissolving the Union between the two countries.
- 1913 – The United Mine Workers of America launch a strike which eventually escalated into the Colorado Coalfield War.
- 1918 – World War I: British forces capture Haifa, Acre, and Es Salt from the Ottoman Empire.
- 1920 – The Louisiana hurricane dissipates over Kansas after forcing around 4,500 people to evacuate and causing $1.45 million in damages.
- 1932 – Saudi National Day: Crown Prince (later king) Faisal of Saudi Arabia, on behalf of Ibn Saud, proclaims the unification of the Kingdom of Saudi Arabia, the current iteration of the Third Saudi State.
- 1942 – World War II: The Matanikau action on Guadalcanal begins: U.S. Marines attack Japanese units along the Matanikau River.
- 1947 – A magnitude 6.9 earthquake strikes South Khorasan in Iran, killing over 500 people.
- 1950 – Korean War: The Battle of Hill 282 is the first US friendly-fire incident on British military personnel since World War II.
- 1951 – George VI, king of the United Kingdom, has his left lung removed in an operation after a malignant tumour was found.
- 1952 – After being accused of financial improprieties, Senator Richard Nixon delivers his "Checkers speech" nationwide on television and radio, defending his actions and successfully salvaging his nomination as the Republican candidate for Vice President.
- 1955 – An all-white jury in Mississippi finds Roy Bryant and J. W. Milam not guilty in the torture-murder of 14-year-old African American boy Emmett Till.
- 1956 – A tropical storm originating in the eastern Pacific Ocean passes into the Gulf of Mexico and is upgraded and named Hurricane Flossy just hours before striking the Gulf Coast and causing 15 deaths and an estimated US$24.8 million in damages.
- 1957 – Little Rock schools integration crisis: President Dwight D. Eisenhower sends the 101st Airborne Division to Little Rock, Arkansas, and federalizes the Arkansas National Guard, ordering both to support the integration of Little Rock Central High School.
- 1961 – U.S. President John F. Kennedy nominates African American civil rights lawyer Thurgood Marshall to the Court of Appeals for the Second Circuit, although pro-segregation Southern senators manage to delay his confirmation until September 11, 1962.
- 1962 – Flying Tiger Line Flight 923, a Lockheed L-1049H Super Constellation registered as N6923C, ditches into the Atlantic Ocean killing 28 out the 76 occupants onboard. The remaining 48 were rescued six hours later.
- 1964 – Typhoon Wilda, one of the strongest typhoons to ever strike Japan, makes landfall, causing at least 30 fatalities and sinking at least 64 ships.
- 1967 – Seven people die, 46 people are injured, and more than 150 boats capsize when a squall hits Lake Michigan during Michigan's first coho salmon sport fishing season.
- 1973 – Argentine general election: Juan Perón returns to power in Argentina.
- 1983 – Gulf Air Flight 771 is destroyed by a bomb, killing all 112 people on board.
- 1999 – Qantas Flight 1 overruns a runway in Bangkok during a storm, causing minor injuries to some passengers.
- 2004 – Over 3,000 people die in Haiti after Hurricane Jeanne produces massive flooding and mudslides.
- 2008 – Matti Saari kills ten people at a school in Finland before committing suicide.
- 2010 – Teresa Lewis becomes the first woman to be executed by the U.S. state of Virginia since 1912, and the first woman in the state to be executed by lethal injection.
- 2013 – Twenty-five people are killed after Typhoon Usagi passes Hong Kong and China.
- 2019 – Twenty people die on the first of two days of rioting in Papua and West Papua over an alleged racist incident.
- 2020 – A grand jury in Kentucky declines to indict three police officers for the shooting death of Breonna Taylor in a drug raid gone wrong, leading to nationwide protests in the U.S.
- 2022 – Voting begins in the five-day sham annexation referendums in Russian-occupied Ukraine, leading to Russian annexation of Donetsk, Kherson, Luhansk and Zaporizhzhia oblasts.
- 2024 – Israel launches airstrikes against Hezbollah targets in Lebanon, killing more than 490 people.

== Births ==
=== Pre-1600 ===
- 63 BC – Augustus, Roman emperor (died 14 AD)
- 1158 – Geoffrey II, Duke of Brittany (died 1186)
- 1215 – Kublai Khan, Mongolian emperor (died 1294)
- 1495 – Bagrat III of Imereti, King of Imereti (died 1565)
- 1597 – Francesco Barberini, Catholic cardinal (died 1679)
- 1598 – Eleonore Gonzaga, Italian wife of Ferdinand II, Holy Roman Emperor (died 1655)

=== 1601–1900 ===
- 1642 – Giovanni Maria Bononcini, Italian violinist and composer (died 1678)
- 1647 – Joseph Dudley, English politician, Governor of the Province of Massachusetts Bay (died 1720)
- 1650 – Jeremy Collier, English bishop and theologian (died 1726)
- 1713 – Ferdinand VI of Spain (died 1759)
- 1740 – Empress Go-Sakuramachi of Japan (died 1813)
- 1756 – John Loudon McAdam, Scottish engineer (died 1836)
- 1768 – William Wallace Scottish mathematician (invented the eidograph) (died 1843)
- 1771 – Emperor Kōkaku of Japan (died 1840)
- 1778 – Mariano Moreno, Argentinian journalist, lawyer, and politician (died 1811)
- 1781 – Princess Juliane of Saxe-Coburg-Saalfeld (died 1860)
- 1791 – Johann Franz Encke, German astronomer and academic (died 1865)
- 1791 – Theodor Körner, German soldier and author (died 1813)
- 1800 – William Holmes McGuffey, American author and academic (died 1873)
- 1819 – Hippolyte Fizeau, French physicist and academic (died 1896)
- 1823 – John Colton, English-Australian politician, 13th Premier of South Australia (died 1902)
- 1838 – Victoria Woodhull, American journalist and activist (died 1927)
- 1851 – Ellen Hayes, American mathematician and astronomer (died 1930)
- 1852 – James Carroll Beckwith, American painter and academic (died 1917)
- 1852 – William Stewart Halsted, American physician and surgeon (died 1922)
- 1853 – Princess Marie Elisabeth of Saxe-Meiningen (died 1923)
- 1861 – Robert Bosch, German engineer and businessman, founded Robert Bosch GmbH (died 1942)
- 1863 – Mary Church Terrell, American author and activist (died 1954)
- 1863 – Alexandre Yersin, Swiss-French physician and bacteriologist (died 1943)
- 1865 – Pekka Halonen, Finnish painter (died 1933)
- 1865 – Emma Orczy, Hungarian-English author and playwright (died 1947)
- 1865 – Suzanne Valadon, French model and painter (died 1938)
- 1867 – John Lomax, American teacher, musicologist, and folklorist (died 1948)
- 1869 – Mary Mallon, American cook and typhoid carrier (died 1938)
- 1876 – Moshe Zvi Segal, Israeli rabbi and scholar (died 1968)
- 1880 – John Boyd Orr, 1st Baron Boyd-Orr, Scottish biologist, physician, and politician, Nobel Prize laureate (died 1971)
- 1887 – Alfieri Maserati, Italian auto racer and engineer (established Maserati Racing) (died 1932)
- 1889 – Walter Lippmann, American journalist and publisher, co-founded The New Republic (died 1974)
- 1890 – Friedrich Paulus, German field marshal (died 1957)
- 1895 – Miron Merzhanov, Russian architect and engineer (died 1975)
- 1895 – Johnny Mokan, American baseball player (died 1985)
- 1897 – Paul Delvaux, Belgian painter (died 1994)
- 1897 – Walter Pidgeon, Canadian-American actor and singer (died 1984)
- 1898 – Les Haylen, Australian journalist and politician (died 1977)
- 1899 – Tom C. Clark, American lawyer and judge, 59th Attorney General of the United States (died 1977)
- 1899 – Louise Nevelson, American sculptor (died 1988)
- 1900 – Fred C. Koch, American chemical engineer and entrepreneur (Koch Industries) (died 1996)
- 1900 – Bill Stone, English soldier (died 2009)

=== 1901–present ===
- 1901 – Jaroslav Seifert, Czech poet and journalist, Nobel Prize laureate (died 1986)
- 1902 – Su Buqing, Chinese mathematician and academic (died 2003)
- 1903 – Cec Fifield, Australian rugby league player and coach (died 1957)
- 1904 – Arthur Folwell, English-Australian rugby league player, coach, and administrator (died 1966)
- 1906 – Charles Ritchie, Canadian diplomat, High Commission of Canada in the United Kingdom (died 1995)
- 1907 – Tiny Bradshaw, American singer-songwriter and pianist (died 1958)
- 1907 – Anne Desclos, French journalist and author (died 1998)
- 1907 – Duarte Nuno, Duke of Braganza (died 1976)
- 1908 – Ramdhari Singh Dinkar, Indian poet, academic, and politician (died 1974)
- 1909 – Lorenc Antoni, Kosovo-Albanian composer and conductor (died 1991)
- 1910 – Elliott Roosevelt, American general, writer and son of FDR (died 1990)
- 1910 – Jakob Streit, Swiss anthroposophist and author (died 2009)
- 1911 – Frank Moss, American lawyer and politician (died 2003)
- 1912 – Ghulam Mustafa Khan, Pakistani linguist, author, and critic (died 2005)
- 1912 – Tony Smith, American sculptor and educator (died 1980)
- 1913 – Carl-Henning Pedersen, Danish painter and sculptor (died 2007)
- 1915 – Julius Baker, American flute player and educator (died 2003)
- 1915 – Clifford Shull, American physicist and academic, Nobel Prize laureate (died 2001)
- 1916 – Aldo Moro, Italian academic and politician, 39th Prime Minister of Italy (died 1978)
- 1917 – El Santo, Mexican Luchador enmascarado, film actor, and folk icon (died 1984)
- 1917 – Asima Chatterjee, Indian chemist (died 2006)
- 1920 – Mickey Rooney, American actor, singer, director, and producer (died 2014)
- 1923 – Mohamed Hassanein Heikal, Egyptian journalist (died 2016)
- 1923 – Vello Helk, Estonian-Danish historian and author (died 2014)
- 1924 – Pedro Joaquín Chamorro Cardenal, Nicaraguan journalist and publisher (died 1978)
- 1925 – Denis C. Twitchett, English historian and scholar (died 2006)
- 1926 – André Cassagnes, French toy maker, created the Etch A Sketch (died 2013)
- 1926 – John William Coltrane, American jazz saxophonist and composer (died 1967)
- 1928 – Frank Foster, American saxophonist and composer (died 2011)
- 1928 – Roger Grimsby, American journalist and actor (died 1995)
- 1930 – Sehba Akhtar, Pakistani poet and songwriter (died 1996)
- 1930 – Colin Blakely, Northern Irish actor (died 1987)
- 1930 – Ray Charles, American singer-songwriter, pianist, and actor (died 2004)
- 1931 – Hilly Kristal, American businessman, founded CBGB (died 2007)
- 1931 – Stan Lynde, American author and illustrator (died 2013)
- 1931 – Gerald Merrithew, Canadian educator and politician (died 2004)
- 1932 – Georg Keßler, German footballer and manager
- 1933 – Lloyd J. Old, American immunologist and academic (died 2011)
- 1934 – Per Olov Enquist, Swedish journalist, author, and playwright (died 2020)
- 1935 – Prem Chopra, Indian actor
- 1935 – Les McCann, American soul-jazz singer and pianist (died 2023)
- 1935 – Ron Tindall, English-Australian footballer, cricketer, and manager (died 2012)
- 1936 – George Eastham, English footballer (died 2024)
- 1936 – Valentín Paniagua, Peruvian lawyer and politician, 91st President of Peru (died 2006)
- 1936 – Sylvain Saudan, Swiss skier (died 2024)
- 1936 – Tareq Suheimat, Jordanian physician, general, and politician (died 2014)
- 1937 – Jacques Poulin, Canadian author and translator (died 2025)
- 1938 – Arie L. Kopelman, American businessman (died 2024)
- 1938 – Romy Schneider, German-French actress (died 1982)
- 1939 – Henry Blofeld, English cricketer and journalist
- 1939 – Roy Buchanan, American singer-songwriter and guitarist (died 1988)
- 1939 – Joan Hanham, Baroness Hanham, English politician
- 1939 – Sonny Vaccaro, American businessman
- 1940 – Michel Temer, Brazilian lawyer and politician, 25th Vice President of Brazil
- 1940 – Dick Thornett, Australian rugby player and water polo player (died 2011)
- 1941 – George Jackson, American activist and author, co-founded the Black Guerrilla Family (died 1971)
- 1941 – Simon Nolet, Canadian ice hockey player and coach
- 1941 – Norma Winstone, English singer-songwriter
- 1942 – Sila María Calderón, Puerto Rican-American businesswoman and politician, 12th Secretary of State of Puerto Rico
- 1942 – Colin Low, Baron Low of Dalston, Scottish scholar and politician
- 1942 – David Renneberg, Australian cricketer (died 2025)
- 1943 – Julio Iglesias, Spanish singer-songwriter
- 1943 – Marty Schottenheimer, American football player and coach (died 2021)
- 1944 – Eric Bogle, Scottish-Australian singer-songwriter and guitarist
- 1945 – Igor Ivanov, Russian politician and diplomat, Russian Minister of Foreign Affairs
- 1945 – Alan Old, English rugby player
- 1945 – Paul Petersen, American actor, singer, author, and activist
- 1946 – Franz Fischler, Austrian politician
- 1946 – Bernard Maris, French economist and journalist (died 2015)
- 1946 – Genista McIntosh, Baroness McIntosh, English politician
- 1946 – Davorin Popović, Bosnian singer-songwriter (died 2001)
- 1946 – Anne Wheeler, Canadian director, producer, and screenwriter
- 1947 – Christian Bordeleau, Canadian ice hockey player
- 1947 – Don Grolnick, American jazz pianist, composer and session musician (Brecker Brothers; Linda Ronstadt; James Taylor)
- 1947 – Mary Kay Place, American actress
- 1947 – Neal Smith, American drummer and songwriter
- 1948 – Dan Toler, American guitarist (died 2013)
- 1949 – Floella Benjamin, Trinidadian-English actress, academic, and politician
- 1949 – Bruce Springsteen, American singer-songwriter and guitarist
- 1949 – Kostas Tournas, Greek singer-songwriter
- 1950 – George Garzone, American saxophonist and educator
- 1951 – Steven Springer, American guitarist and songwriter (died 2012)
- 1952 – Mark Bego, American author
- 1952 – Anshuman Gaekwad, Indian cricketer
- 1952 – Dennis Lamp, American baseball player
- 1952 – Kim Duk-soo, Korean musician
- 1952 – Jim Morrison, American baseball player and manager
- 1953 – Nicholas Witchell, English journalist
- 1954 – Charlie Barnett, American actor (died 1996)
- 1954 – Cherie Blair, English lawyer and academic
- 1956 – Peter David, American author, actor, and screenwriter (died 2025)
- 1956 – Tom Hogan, Australian cricketer
- 1956 – Paolo Rossi, Italian footballer (died 2020)
- 1957 – Rosalind Chao, American actress
- 1958 – Danielle Dax, English singer-songwriter and producer
- 1958 – Khaled El Sheikh, Bahraini singer-songwriter
- 1958 – Tony Fossas, Cuban-American baseball player and coach
- 1958 – Marvin Lewis, American football player and coach
- 1958 – Larry Mize, American golfer
- 1959 – Jason Alexander, American actor, singer, and voice artist
- 1959 – Frank Cottrell-Boyce, English author and screenwriter
- 1959 – Hans Nijman, Dutch mixed martial artist and wrestler (died 2014)
- 1959 – Chris O'Sullivan, Australian rugby league player
- 1959 – Elizabeth Peña, American actress (died 2014)
- 1959 – Karen Pierce, English diplomat
- 1960 – Kurt Beyer, American wrestler
- 1960 – Luis Moya, Spanish race car driver
- 1961 – Chi McBride, American actor
- 1961 – William C. McCool, American commander, pilot, and astronaut (died 2003)
- 1962 – Deborah Orr, Scottish journalist (died 2019)
- 1963 – Anne-Marie Cadieux, Canadian actress, director, and screenwriter
- 1963 – Alex Proyas, Egyptian-Australian director, producer, and screenwriter
- 1964 – Clayton Blackmore, Welsh footballer and manager
- 1964 – Josefa Idem, German-born Italian kayaker
- 1964 – Koshi Inaba, Japanese singer-songwriter
- 1964 – Larry Krystkowiak, American basketball player and coach
- 1964 – Katie Mitchell, English director and producer
- 1964 – Julian Parkhill, English biologist and academic
- 1964 – Bill Phillips, American businessman and author
- 1965 – Mark Woodforde, Australian tennis player and sportscaster
- 1966 – Pete Harnisch, American baseball player and coach
- 1967 – LisaRaye McCoy, American actress, model, fashion designer, and First Lady of the Turks and Caicos Islands
- 1967 – Chris Wilder, English footballer and manager
- 1968 – Yvette Fielding, English actress and producer
- 1968 – Adam Price, Welsh politician
- 1969 – Donald Audette, Canadian ice hockey player
- 1969 – Patrick Fiori, French singer-songwriter
- 1969 – Jan Suchopárek, Czech footballer and manager
- 1970 – Adrian Brunker, Australian rugby league player
- 1970 – Lucia Cifarelli, American singer-songwriter and keyboard player
- 1970 – Ani DiFranco, American singer-songwriter and guitarist
- 1970 – Giorgos Koltsidas, Greek footballer
- 1971 – Moin Khan, Pakistani cricketer and coach
- 1971 – Eric Montross, American basketball player and sportscaster (died 2023)
- 1971 – Sean Spicer, American political aide, 30th White House Press Secretary
- 1972 – Sam Bettens, Belgian singer-songwriter and guitarist
- 1972 – Alistair Campbell, Zimbabwean cricketer
- 1972 – Jermaine Dupri, American rapper and producer
- 1972 – Karl Pilkington, English actor and producer
- 1973 – Ingrid Fliter, Argentinian pianist
- 1973 – Vangelis Krios, Greek footballer and coach
- 1974 – Ben Duckworth, Australian rugby league player
- 1974 – Matt Hardy, American wrestler
- 1974 – Layzie Bone, American rapper
- 1975 – Kim Dong-moon, South Korean badminton player
- 1975 – Chris Hawkins, English journalist and producer
- 1975 – Eric Miller, Irish rugby player, footballer, and coach
- 1975 – Vitali Yeremeyev, Kazakhstani ice hockey player
- 1976 – Sarah Blasko, Australian singer-songwriter and producer
- 1976 – Robert James-Collier, English actor
- 1976 – Kip Pardue, American actor and model
- 1976 – Valeriy Sydorenko, Ukrainian boxer
- 1976 – Volodymyr Sydorenko, Ukrainian boxer
- 1977 – Matthieu Descoteaux, Canadian ice hockey player
- 1977 – Dmitri Kulikov, Estonian footballer
- 1977 – Fabio Ongaro, Italian rugby player
- 1977 – Rachael Yamagata, American singer-songwriter and pianist
- 1978 – Benjamin Curtis, American guitarist, drummer, and songwriter (died 2013)
- 1978 – Anthony Mackie, American actor
- 1979 – Ricky Davis, American basketball player
- 1979 – Bryant McKinnie, American football player
- 1979 – Fábio Simplício, Brazilian footballer
- 1979 – Lote Tuqiri, Fijian-Australian rugby player
- 1981 – Robert Doornbos, Dutch racing driver
- 1981 – Helen Richardson-Walsh, English field hockey player
- 1982 – Mait Künnap, Estonian tennis player
- 1982 – Shyla Stylez, Canadian pornographic actress (died 2017)
- 1983 – Shane del Rosario, American mixed martial artist and kick-boxer (died 2013)
- 1983 – Joffrey Lupul, Canadian ice hockey player
- 1984 – Patrick Ehelechner, German ice hockey player
- 1984 – Matt Kemp, American baseball player
- 1984 – Anneliese van der Pol, Dutch-American entertainer
- 1985 – Joba Chamberlain, American baseball player
- 1985 – Chris Johnson, American football player
- 1985 – Cush Jumbo, British actress
- 1985 – Lukáš Kašpar, Czech ice hockey player
- 1985 – Hasan Minhaj, American comedian, actor, and television host
- 1986 – Martin Cranie, English footballer
- 1986 – Chris Volstad, American baseball player
- 1987 – Skylar Astin, American actor and singer
- 1988 – Juan Martín del Potro, Argentinian tennis player
- 1988 – Kairi Sane, Japanese wrestler
- 1988 – Yannick Weber, Swiss ice hockey player
- 1989 – Brandon Jennings, American basketball player
- 1989 – Taniela Lasalo, Australian rugby league player
- 1991 – Lee Alexander, Scottish footballer
- 1991 – Key, South Korean singer and entertainer
- 1991 – Melanie Oudin, American tennis player
- 1992 – Angel Garza, Mexican wrestler
- 1993 – Petteri Lindbohm, Finnish ice hockey player
- 1994 – Lee Mi-joo, South Korean singer and entertainer
- 1994 – Bai Lu, Chinese Actress
- 1996 – Napheesa Collier, American basketball player
- 1997 – John Collins, American basketball player
- 1999 – Song Yu-qi, Chinese singer
- 2001 – Lai Kuan-lin, Taiwanese film director

== Deaths ==
=== Pre-1600 ===
- 788 – Ælfwald I, king of Northumbria
- 965 – Al-Mutanabbi, Arab poet (born 915)
- 1193 – Robert de Sablé, French knight
- 1241 – Snorri Sturluson, Icelandic historian, poet, and politician (born 1178)
- 1253 – Wenceslaus I of Bohemia
- 1267 – Beatrice of Provence, countess regnant of Provence (born 1234)
- 1386 – Dan I of Wallachia
- 1390 – John I, Duke of Lorraine (born 1346)
- 1448 – Adolph I, Duke of Cleves (born 1373)
- 1461 – Charles, Prince of Viana, King of Navarre (born 1421)
- 1508 – Beatrice of Naples, queen consort of Hungary (born 1457)
- 1535 – Catherine of Saxe-Lauenburg (born 1513)
- 1571 – John Jewel, English bishop (born 1522)
- 1573 – Azai Hisamasa, Japanese warlord (born 1524)

=== 1601–1900 ===
- 1605 – Pontus de Tyard, French priest and poet (born 1521)
- 1675 – Valentin Conrart, French author, founded the Académie française (born 1603)
- 1728 – Christian Thomasius, German jurist and philosopher (born 1655)
- 1738 – Herman Boerhaave, Dutch botanist and physician (born 1668)
- 1764 – Robert Dodsley, English poet and playwright (born 1703)
- 1773 – Johan Ernst Gunnerus, Norwegian bishop and botanist (born 1718)
- 1789 – John Rogers, American lawyer and politician (born 1723)
- 1835 – Vincenzo Bellini, Italian composer (born 1801)
- 1851 – Émilie Gamelin, Canadian nun, founded the Sisters of Providence (born 1800)
- 1846 – John Ainsworth Horrocks, English-Australian explorer (born 1818)
- 1850 – José Gervasio Artigas, Uruguayan general and politician (born 1764)
- 1870 – Prosper Mérimée, French archaeologist and historian (born 1803)
- 1871 – Louis-Joseph Papineau, Canadian lawyer and politician (born 1786)
- 1873 – Jean Chacornac, French astronomer (born 1823)
- 1877 – Urbain Le Verrier, French mathematician and astronomer (born 1811)
- 1889 – Wilkie Collins, English novelist, short story writer, and playwright (born 1824)
- 1896 – Emmanuel Benner, French artist (born 1836)
- 1900 – William Marsh Rice, American businessman, founded Rice University (born 1816)

=== 1901–present ===
- 1913 – Donato Álvarez, Argentinian general (born 1825)
- 1917 – Werner Voss, German lieutenant and pilot (born 1897)
- 1929 – Richard Adolf Zsigmondy, Austrian-German chemist, physicist, and academic, Nobel Prize laureate (born 1865)
- 1939 – Sigmund Freud, Austrian neurologist and psychiatrist (born 1856)
- 1939 – Francisco León de la Barra, Mexican politician and diplomat, interim president, 1911 (born 1863)
- 1940 – Hale Holden, American businessman (born 1869)
- 1943 – Elinor Glyn, English author, screenwriter, and producer (born 1864)
- 1944 – Jakob Schaffner, Swiss author and critic (born 1875)
- 1950 – Sam Barry, American basketball player and coach (born 1892)
- 1951 – Siegfried Bettmann, German engineer (born 1863)
- 1958 – Jacob Nicol, Canadian publisher, lawyer, and politician (born 1876)
- 1967 – Stanislaus Zbyszko, Polish wrestler and strongman (born 1879)
- 1968 – Pio of Pietrelcina, Italian priest and saint (born 1887)
- 1971 – James Waddell Alexander II, American mathematician and topologist (born 1888)
- 1973 – Pablo Neruda, Chilean poet and diplomat, Nobel Prize laureate (born 1904)
- 1974 – Cliff Arquette, American actor and comedian (born 1905)
- 1974 – Robbie McIntosh, Scottish drummer (born 1950)
- 1978 – Lyman Bostock, American baseball player (born 1950)
- 1979 – Catherine Lacey, English actress (born 1904)
- 1980 – Jim Fouché, State President of South Africa (born 1898)
- 1981 – Chief Dan George, Canadian actor, author, and poet (born 1899)
- 1987 – Bob Fosse, American actor, dancer, choreographer, and director (born 1927)
- 1988 – Tibor Sekelj, Hungarian-Serbian explorer and author (born 1912)
- 1992 – Ivar Ivask, Estonian poet and scholar (born 1927)
- 1992 – Glendon Swarthout, American author and academic (born 1918)
- 1992 – James Van Fleet, American general (born 1892)
- 1994 – Jerry Barber, American golfer (born 1916)
- 1994 – Robert Bloch, American author and screenwriter (born 1917)
- 1994 – Madeleine Renaud, French actress (born 1900)
- 1997 – Natalie Savage Carlson, American author (born 1906)
- 1998 – Ray Bowden, English footballer (born 1909)
- 1998 – Mary Frann, American actress (born 1943)
- 1999 – Ivan Goff, Australian-American screenwriter and producer (born 1910)
- 2000 – Aurelio Rodríguez, Mexican baseball player and manager (born 1947)
- 2000 – Carl Rowan, American journalist and author (born 1925)
- 2000 – Raoul Berger, American attorney and law professor (born 1901)
- 2001 – Ron Hewitt, Welsh footballer (born 1928)
- 2003 – Yuri Senkevich, Russian physician and journalist (born 1937)
- 2004 – Billy Reay, Canadian-American ice hockey player and coach (born 1918)
- 2005 – Filiberto Ojeda Ríos, Puerto Rican activist (born 1933)
- 2006 – Malcolm Arnold, English trumpet player and composer (born 1921)
- 2006 – Etta Baker, American singer and guitarist (born 1913)
- 2008 – Peter Leonard, Australian journalist (born 1942)
- 2008 – Loren Pope, American journalist and author (born 1910)
- 2009 – Paul B. Fay, American sailor and politician, United States Secretary of the Navy (born 1918)
- 2010 – Malcolm Douglas, Australian hunter and television host (born 1941)
- 2012 – Henry Champ, Canadian journalist and academic (born 1937)
- 2012 – Pavel Grachev, Russian general and politician, 1st Minister of Defence for Russia (born 1948)
- 2012 – Roberto Rodríguez, Venezuelan baseball player and coach (born 1941)
- 2012 – Corrie Sanders, South African boxer (born 1966)
- 2012 – Sam Sniderman, Canadian businessman, founded Sam the Record Man (born 1920)
- 2013 – Abdel Hamid al-Sarraj, Syrian colonel and politician (born 1925)
- 2013 – Gil Dozier, American captain, lawyer, and politician (born 1934)
- 2013 – Ruth Patrick, American botanist and immunologist (born 1907)
- 2014 – A. W. Davis, American basketball player and coach (born 1943)
- 2014 – Irven DeVore, American anthropologist and biologist (born 1934)
- 2014 – Don Manoukian, American football player and wrestler (born 1934)
- 2014 – Al Suomi, American ice hockey player and referee (born 1913)
- 2015 – Dayananda Saraswati, Indian monk and philosopher (born 1930)
- 2018 – Charles Kuen Kao, Hong Kong-American-British electrical engineer and physicist (born 1933)
- 2018 – Gary Kurtz, American film producer (born 1940)
- 2018 – Jane Fortune, American author, journalist, and philanthropist (born 1942)
- 2020 – Juliette Gréco, French singer and actress (born 1927)
- 2021 – John Elliott, Australian businessman (born 1941)
- 2021 – Nino Vaccarella, Italian race car driver (born 1933)
- 2026 – Bob Pettit, American basketball player and coach (born 1932)

== Holidays and observances ==
- Christian feast day:
  - Adomnán
  - Blessed Bernardyna Maria Jabłońska
  - Cissa of Crowland (or of Northumbria)
  - Blessed Elena Duglioli
  - Elisabeth and Zechariah
  - Blessed Émilie Gamelin
  - Blessed Francisco de Paula Victor
  - Padre Pio
  - Pope Linus
  - Sossius
  - Thecla (Roman Catholic Church)
  - September 23 (Eastern Orthodox liturgics)
- Grito de Lares (Puerto Rico)
- Haifa Day (Israel)
- Holocaust Memorial Day (Lithuania)
- Kyrgyz Language Day (Kyrgyzstan)
- National Day (Saudi Arabia)
- Teachers' Day (Brunei)
- Celebrate Bisexuality Day (bisexual community)
- International Day of Sign Languages
