= A Christmas to Remember =

A Christmas to Remember may refer to:

- A Christmas to Remember (1978 film), American Great Depression TV drama
- Kenny & Dolly: A Christmas to Remember, American TV special, broadcast on CBS December 2, 1984 (Once Upon a Christmas)
- "A Christmas to Remember", American song from 1984 album Once Upon a Christmas
- A Christmas to Remember (album), 1999 American gold album by Amy Grant
- A Christmas to Remember, 2020 English romantic novel by Anton Du Beke
