= The Ventures discography =

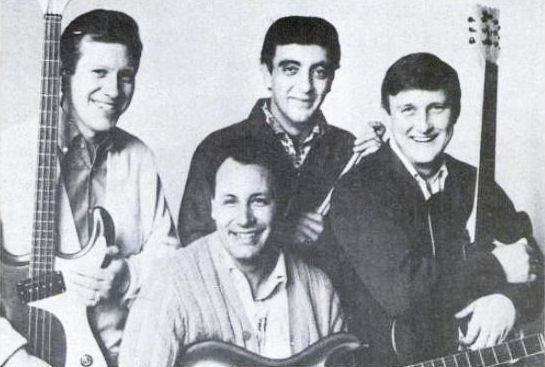
- Studio albums: 60+
- Live albums: 30+
- Compilation albums: 80+
- Singles: 72
- Video albums: 10
- Instructional Albums: 5

The Ventures are an American instrumental band who have released over two hundred fifty albums, beginning with Walk Don't Run (1960), and over 150 singles. The original US albums and singles are indicated by their catalog numbers and Billboard (BB) and Cashbox (CB) chart peak positions. (Note: There were separate Cashbox charts for stereo and mono albums until 1965.)

== Studio albums ==
Studio albums
Year	Album	Peak chart positions			Certifications
Year	Album	US	Cashbox		Certifications
Year	Album	US	Mono	Stereo	Certifications
1960	Walk, Don't Run^{1}: Released: December 5, 1960; Label: Dolton (BLP 2003 (Mono)/BST 8003 (Stereo))	11	19	—	US: Gold
1961	The Ventures: Released: February 4, 1961; Label: Dolton (BLP 2004/BST 8004)	105	24	—	—
1961	Another Smash!!!: Released: June 26, 1961; Label: Dolton (BLP 2006/BST 8006)	39	40	—	—
1961	The Colorful Ventures: Released: October 2, 1961; Label: Dolton (BLP 2008/BST 8008)	94	—	—	—
1962	Twist with the Ventures^{2}: Released: January 20, 1962; Label: Dolton (BLP 2010/BST 8010)	24	24	23	—
1962	Twist Party, Volume 2^{3}: Released: May 19, 1962; Label: Dolton (BLP 2014/BST 8014)	41	43	—	—
1962	Mashed Potatoes and Gravy^{4}: Released: August 11, 1962; Label: Dolton (BLP 2016/BST 8016)	45	41	—	—
1962	Going to the Ventures Dance Party!: Released: November 24, 1962; Label: Dolton (BLP 2017/BST 8017)	93	—	—	—
1963	The Ventures Play Telstar and the Lonely Bull: Released: January 5, 1963; Label: Dolton (BLP 2019/BST 8019)	8	13	20	US: Gold
1963	Surfing: Released: May 4, 1963; Label: Dolton (BLP 2022/BST 8022)	30	10	21	—
1963	Bobby Vee Meets the Ventures: Released: June 1, 1963; Label: Liberty (LRP 3289/LST 7289)	91	37	—	—
1963	The Ventures Play the Country Classics^{5}: Released: June 8, 1963; Label: Dolton (BLP 2023/BST 8023)	101	50	—	—
1963	Let's Go!: Released: August 31, 1963; Label: Dolton (BLP 2024/BST 8024)	30	18	19	—
1964	The Ventures in Space: Released: January 25, 1964; Label: Dolton (BLP 2027/BST 8027)	27	13	11	—
1964	The Fabulous Ventures: Released: July 18, 1964; Label: Dolton (BLP 2029/BST 8029)	32	18	19	—
1964	Walk, Don't Run, Vol. 2^{6}: Released: October 10, 1964; Label: Dolton (BLP 2031/BST 8031)	17	14		—
1965	Knock Me Out!: Released: February 13, 1965; Label: Dolton (BLP 2033/BST 8033)	31	19		—
1965	The Ventures a Go-Go: Released: September 25, 1965; Label: Dolton (BLP 2037/BST 8037)	16	12		—
1965	The Ventures’ Christmas Album^{7}: Released: November 1965; Label: Dolton (BLP 2038/BST 8038)	9	100		—
1966	Where the Action Is!: Released: February 12, 1966; Label: Dolton (BLP 2040/BST 8040)	33	27		—
1966	Play the Batman Theme: Released: March 5, 1966; Label: Dolton (BLP 2042/BST 8042)	42	25		—
1966	Go with the Ventures: Released: June 11, 1966; Label: Dolton (BLP 2045/BST 8045)	39	19		—
1966	Wild Things!: Released: September 17, 1966; Label: Dolton (BLP 2047/BST 8047)	33	28		—
1967	Guitar Freakout^{8}: Released: February 18, 1967; Label: Dolton (BLP 2050/BST 8050)	57	18		—
1967	Super Psychedelics^{9}: Released: June 3, 1967; Label: Liberty (LRP 2052/LST 8052)	69	50		—
1967	$1,000,000 Weekend: Released: December 23, 1967; Label: Liberty (LRP 2054/LST 8054)	55	51		—
1967	Pops In Japan ^{15}: Released: June, 1967; Label: Liberty (LP-8161); Japanese-only original album	—	—		—
1968	Flights of Fantasy: Released: May 25, 1968; Label: Liberty (LRP 2055/LST 8055)	169	79		—
1968	The Horse^{10}: Released: August 24, 1968; Label: Liberty (LST 8057)	128	69		—
1968	Pops In Japan, No. 2 ^{15}: Released: 1968; Label: Liberty (LP-8351); Japanese-only original album	—	—		—
1969	Underground Fire: Released: January 18, 1969; Label: Liberty (LST 8059)	157	—		—
1969	Hawaii Five-O: Released: May 10, 1969; Label: Liberty (LST 8061)	11	10		US: Gold
1969	Swamp Rock: Released: December 13, 1969; Label: Liberty (LST 8062)	81	—		—
1970	10th Anniversary Album: Released: October 10, 1970; Label: Liberty (LST 35000)	91	—		—
1971	New Testament: Released: April 1971; Label: United Artists (UAS 6796)	—	—		—
1971	Pops In Japan '71 ^{15}: Label: Liberty (LLP-80296); Japanese-only original album	—	—		—
1971	Best of Pops Sound: Label: United Artists (UAS 29249); European compilation from the Japanese Pops albums	—	—		—
1972	Theme from "Shaft": Released: January 15, 1972; Label: United Artists (UAS 5546)	195	—		—
1972	Joy: The Ventures Play the Classics: Released: March 18, 1972; Label: United Artists (UAS 5575)	146	—		—
1972	Rock and Roll Forever^{11}: Released: September 1972; Label: United Artists (UAS 5649)	—	—		—
1973	Only Hits!: Label: United Artists (UA-LA147-G2)	—	—		—
1973	Pops In Japan '73 ^{15}: Label: Liberty (LLP 80801); Japanese-only original album	—	—		—
1974	The Jim Croce Songbook: Released: April 1974; Label: United Artists (UA-LA217-E)	—	—		—
1974	The Ventures Play the Carpenters: Released: July 1974; Label: United Artists (UA-LA231-G)	—	—		—
1975	Now Playing: Released: August 1975; Label: United Artists (UA-LA471-G)	—	—		—
1975	Hollywood: Yuya Uchida Meets the Ventures: Label: Liberty (LLS 80302); Japanese-only original album; vocals by Yuya Uchida	—	—		—
1976	Rocky Road: The New Ventures: Released: March 1976; Label: United Artists (UA-LA586-F)	—	—		—
1977	T.V. Themes^{12}: Released: February 1977; Label: United Artists (UA-LA717-F)	—	—		—
1979	Latin Album: Label: King (GP 685); Japanese-only original album	—	—		—
1980	Chameleon: Label: Eastworld/Toshiba EMI (EWS-81332)	—	—		—
1981	60's Pop: Label: Eastworld/Toshiba EMI (EWS-91012)	—	—		—
1982	The Last Album on Liberty: Label: Liberty (K28P-318)	—	—		—
1983	NASA 25th Anniversary Commemorative Album^{13}: Released: June 1983; Label: Tridex (TDX 1003)	—	—		—
1991	The Ventures Play Major Motion Picture: Label: Japan CD (TOCP-6775)	—	—		—
1991	The Ventures Play Seaside Story: Label: Japan CD (TOCP-6740)	—	—		—
1996	The Ventures Favorites: Label: Liberty (MASTERS 1171)	—	—		—
1997	Wild Again: Label: GNP Crescendo (GNPD 2252)	—	—		—
1998	New Depths: Released: October 20, 1998; Label: GNP Crescendo (GNPD 2259)	—	—		—
1999	Walk Don't Run 2000^{14}: Label: Japan CD (MYCV-30002)	—	—		—
2000	Gold: Label: The Gold Label (GLDCD 8011)	—	—		—
2001	The Ventures Play Southern All Stars: Label: Japan CD (MYCV-30093)	—	—		—
2002	Christmas Joy: Label: Varèse Sarabande (302 066 401 2)	—	—		—
2007	Rocky!: Label: Japan CD (TOCP-70259)	—	—		—
2010	In My Life: Label: Japan CD (TOCP-70839)	—	—		—
2023	New Space: Label: Hi-Tide Recordings (HT-098)	—	—		—
"—" denotes releases that did not chart.
NOTES: ^{1} As the Ventures were unavailable for the photo shoot, Liberty Records employees substituted for them on the cover. Reissued in 1970 on Liberty with new cover (LST 8003).; ^{2} Later retitled Dance! with new album cover.; ^{3} Later retitled Dance with the Ventures with new album cover.; ^{4} Later retitled Beach Party with new album cover.; ^{5} Reissued in 1970 on Liberty as I Walk the Line and Other Great Hits (LST 8023).; ^{6} Reissued in 1970 on Liberty with new album cover (LST 8031).; ^{7} Position on the Billboard Christmas Albums chart. Charted again in 1966, 1967, and 1968.; ^{8} Reissued in 1970 on Liberty as Revolving Sounds (LST 8050).; ^{9} Reissued in 1970 on Liberty as Changing Times (LST 8052).; ^{10} Reissued in 1970 on Liberty as On the Scene (LST 8057).; ^{11} "...special thanks to Harvey Mandel.,,".; ^{12} Reissued in 1984 on Liberty as TV Themes (LN-10224); ^{13} EA 12003 Award Records, Record cover notes: Published by PFM, Inc. Copyright 1984 Award Masters, Inc. Record produced in clear Vinyl! Official Album Of The L5 Society, Promoting Space Development; ^{14} Nancy Sinatra vocal on "Kicks"; ^{15} The three Pops In Japan albums were expanded and reissued as two-LP sets in 1976

== Live albums ==
- (1965) The Ventures in Japan
- (1965) The Ventures in Japan, Vol. 2
- (June 1965) The Ventures on Stage (BB #27, CB #19) —Dolton BLP 8035/BST 8035
- (1966) All About the Ventures
- (1967) The Ventures on Stage Encore
- (1968) The Ventures Live, Again!
- (1968) The Ventures in Tokyo '68
- (1970) Live! The Ventures
- (1971) The Ventures on Stage '71
- (1972) The Ventures on Stage '72
- (1973) The Ventures on Stage '73
- (1974) The Ventures Special '74 on Japanese Tour
- (1974) The Ventures on Stage '74
- (1975) The Ventures on Stage '75
- (1976) The Ventures on Stage '76
- (1977) Live in Japan '77
- (1978) The Ventures on Stage '78
- (1980) Super Live '80
- (1981) Live in L.A.
- (1984) Original Members: Live in Japan
- (1995) Live in Japan '65
- (2001) Live in Japan 2000
- (2003) In Japan Live-2000
- (2004) Summer & Winter: Live
- (2005) Alive Five-O Hits Live

== Instructional albums ==
- (August 7, 1965) Play Guitar with The Ventures (BB #96) —Dolton BLP 16501/BST 17501
- (February 12, 1966) Play Guitar, Vol. 2 —Dolton BLP 16502/BST 17502
- (May 1966) Play Guitar, Vol. 3 —Dolton BLP 16503/BST 17503
- (August 1966) Play Guitar, Vol. 4: Play Electric Bass —Dolton BLP 16504/BST 17504
- (1967) Play Guitar, Vol. 7 —Dolton BLP 16507/BST 17507 (Note: Vol. 5 and Vol. 6 were not featured by The Ventures (they were titled "Play Guitar With Jimmy Bryant" and "Play Guitar With Chet Atkins" respectively).)

== Compilation albums ==
- (1963) Tarantella / Memphis
- (July 1966) Running Strong —Sunset SUM 1116/SUS 5116
- (1966) The Versatile Ventures —Liberty SCR 5
- (1967) 8 Miles High
- (September 1967) Golden Greats by The Ventures (BB #50, CB #46) —Liberty LRP 2053/LST 8053
  - Reissued in 1981 on Liberty LTAO 8053
- (January 1968) The Guitar Genius of The Ventures —Sunset SUM 1160/SUS 5160
- (October 1969) Super Group —Sunset SUS 5271
  - Album cover illustration by Dean Torrence (of Jan & Dean)
- (March 1970) More Golden Greats (BB #154) —Liberty LST 8060
- (February 1971) A Decade with the Ventures
- (November 1971) Ventures —United Artists UXS-80
- (August 1973) Only Hits —United Artists UA-LA147-G
- (1974) Legendary Masters
- (January 1975) The Very Best of the Ventures
- (1975) 15th Anniversary Album: 15 Years of Japanese Pops
- (1975) The Ventures' 15th Anniversary
- (1976) Early Sounds of the Ventures
- (1977) 20 Greatest Hits
- (December 1980) Greatest Hits
- (1980) Rare Collections for Great Collectors
- (1980) The Best 10, Vol. 2
- (1980) The Ventures Greatest Hits
- (1981) The Very Best of the Ventures
- (1983) Heritage Series: Movie Themes
- (1983) Heritage Series: Spotlight
- (1983) The Ventures Today
- (1986) Best of the Ventures
- (1986) Television's Greatest Hits, Vol. 1
- (1986) The Collection
- (1987) Compact Ventures
- (1987) The Best of the Ventures
- (1988) Radical Guitars
- (1989) Christmas Classics
- (1989) Walk Don't Run: All Time Greatest Hits
- (1990) EP Collection
- (1990) Legendary Masters: Walk Don't Run — The Best of the Ventures
- (1992) Greatest Hits
- (1992) Legends of Rock 'n' Roll
- (1992) Only the Hits
- (1992) The Ventures Play Telstar, The Lonely Bull And Others / (The) Ventures In Space
- (1994) Walk Don't Run (1960) / The Ventures (1961) — See For Miles Records (C5HCD 618)
- (1994) Another Smash! (1961) / The Colourful Ventures (1961) — See For Miles Records (C5HCD 619)
- (1994) Play the Carpenters (1974) / The Jim Croce Songbook (1974) — See For Miles Records (C5HCD 620)
- (1994) Twist with The Ventures (1962) / Twist Party Vol.2 (1962) — See For Miles Records (C5HCD 621)
- (1994) The Ventures a Go-Go (1965) / Where the Action Is! (1966) — See For Miles Records (C5HCD 622)
- (1995) Guitar Freakout (1967) / Super Psychedelics (1967) — See For Miles Records (C5HCD 627)
- (1995) Walk, Dont't Run Vol.2 (1964) / Knock Me Out! (1965) — See For Miles Records (C5HCD 630)
- (1995) Best of the Ventures
- (1995) Hollywood's Hottest Hits
- (1995) Original
- (1995) Play the Hits
- (1995) Surfing
- (1996) Another Smash!!! / The Ventures
- (1996) Best of Pops Sounds / Go with the Ventures
- (1996) Flights of Fantasy / The Ventures in Space
- (1996) Flights of Fantasy / Underground Fire
- (1996) Go With the Ventures! / Play The Batman Theme
- (1996) Greatest Hits
- (1996) Hawaii Five-O / Swamp Rock
- (1996) Joy! The Ventures Play the Classics / Latin Album
- (1996) Mashed Potatoes and Gravy / Going to the Ventures Dance Party!
- (1996) Super Psychedelics / $1,000,000 Weekend
- (1996) Surfing / The Colorful Ventures
- (1996) Tele-Ventures: The Ventures Perform the Great TV Themes
- (1996) Underground Fire / Hollywood Metal Dynamic Sound 3000
- (1996) Walk Don't Run / Walk, Don't Run, Vol. 2
- (1996) Where the Action Is! / Knock Me Out!
- (1997) 36 All Time Greatest Hits
- (1997) Batman / TV Themes
- (1997) Guitar Freakout / Wild Things!
- (1997) In the Vaults
- (1997) Let's Go / Ventures Play the Country Classics
- (1997) The Lonely Bull / $1,000,000 Weekend
- (1997) New Testament / More Golden Greats
- (1997) Play Guitar with the Ventures
- (1997) Play Guitar (1965) / Play Guitar Vol.2 (1965) — See For Miles Records (C5HCD 654)
- (1997) Play Guitar Vol.3 (1965) / Play Electric Bass Vol.4 (1965) — See For Miles Records (C5HCD 655)
- (1997) Rock and Roll Forever / Now Playing
- (1997) Hawaii Five-O / Swamp Rock
- (1997) TV Themes / Bobby Vee Meets the Ventures
- (1997) The Fabulous Ventures / The Ventures a Go-Go
- (1997) The Ventures
- (1997) Ventures on Stage / Surfing
- (1997) Wild Things! / The Fabulous Ventures
- (1998) Classic 60's Themes
- (1998) EP Collection, Vol. 3
- (1998) Back to Back (7 out of 14 tracks) [w/The Shadows]
- (1998) The Horse / New Testament
- (1998) On Stage Encore / The Ventures Live, Again!
- (1998) Play Guitar, Vols. 1-4 & 7
- (1998) Stars on Guitars
- (1998) The Night Has a Thousand Eyes / Bobby Vee Meets the Ventures
- (1998) Theme from Shaft / Rocky Road
- (1999) Golden Pops / Pops in Japan '71
- (1999) In the Vaults, Vol. 2
- (1999) Rock & Roll Forever / Rocky Road
- (1999) The Ventures
- (1999) The Ventures' 10th Anniversary Album / Only Hits!
- (1999) Theme From Shaft / The Horse
- (1999) Ventures In Japan / Ventures In Japan, Vol. 2
- (2000) Best of the Ventures: Walk Don't Run
- (2000) Gold
- (2000) Hawaii Five-O: Remixed Hits & More
- (2000) Play Screen Themes
- (2000) Story
- (2000) Ventures Gold, Vol. 2
- (2001) Inside the Music: Surf's Up
- (2001) The Ultimate Collection
- (2001) The Ventures Play the Greatest Surfin' Hits of All Time
- (2001) Ventures Gold, Vol. 3
- (2002) Hyper Gold
- (2002) Surf Rock Anthology
- (2002) The Ventures Play the Greatest Instrumental Hits of All-Time
- (2003) All Time Greatest Hits
- (2003) Surfin' With the Ventures
- (2003) The Ventures Play the Greatest Instrumental Hits of All Time, Vol. 2
- (2003) Your Hit Parade 60's
- (2004) Best of, Vol. 1-2
- (2004) Guitar Legends
- (2004) In Japan, Vol. 1-2
- (2004) Pops a la Carte
- (2004) Pops in Japan, Vol. 1-2
- (2004) Sixties Guitar Party
- (2004) Super Deluxe
- (2004) Super Now
- (2004) Surfin' to Baja
- (2004) Walk Don't Run: Very Best Of
- (2005) 10th Anniversary Album
- (2005) In the Vaults, Vol. 3
- (2005) Platinum Collection
- (2005) The Ventures
- (2007) In the Vaults, Vol. 4
- (2008) The Very Best of the Ventures (50 tracks on 2-CDs)

=== Extended plays ===
- (1961) The Ventures, London Records RE-G-1279, UK No. 20.

== Video albums ==
- (1966) Beloved Invaders: The Golden Era of The Ventures
- (1981) The Ventures in L.A.
- (1984) Original Members: Live in Japan
- (1989) 30 Years of Rock 'n' Roll (30th Anniversary Super Session)
- (1991) Live in Japan 1990
- (1994) Japan Tour '93
- (1995) In Concert '94
- (1996) Electrified, Amplified, and Deified
- (1998) Wild Again Concert '97
- (2004) 45th Anniversary Live

== Box sets ==
- (1992) History Box Vol.1 (Toshiba-EMI TOCP-7129-32 Japan)
  - Walk, Don't Run (1960) / The Ventures (1960); Another Smash (1961) / The Colorful Ventures (1961); Twist with the Ventures (1962) / Twist Party, Vol.2 (1962); Mashed Potatoes and Gravy (1962) / Going to the Ventures Dance Party! (1962)
- (1992) History Box Vol.2 (Toshiba-EMI TOCP 7121-24 Japan)
  - Play Telstar and the Lonely Bull (1963) / Surfing (1963); Bobby Vee Meets the Ventures (1963) / Play the Country Classics (1963); Let's Go! (1963) / The Ventures in Space (1964); The Fabulous Ventures (1964) / Walk Don't Run, Vol.2 (1964)
- (1992) History Box Vol.3 (Toshiba-EMI TOCP 7133-36 Japan)
  - Knock Me Out! (1965) / The Ventures on Stage (1965); The Ventures a Go-Go (1965) / Where the Action Is! (1966); Play the Batman Theme (1966) / Go with the Ventures (1966); Wild Things! (1966) / Guitar Freakout (1967)
- (1992) History Box Vol.4 (Toshiba-EMI TOCP 7137-40 Japan)
  - Super Psychedelics (1967) / Golden Greats by the Ventures (1967); $1,000,000 Weekend (1967) / Flights of Fantasy (1968); The Horse (1968) / Underground Fire (1969); Hawaii Five-O (1969) / Swamp Rock (1969)
- (1992) History Box Vol.5 (Toshiba-EMI TOCP 7141-44 Japan)
  - More Golden Greats and Others (1970); 10th Anniversary Album (1970); New Testament (1971) / Theme from 'Shaft' (1972); Joy: Play the Classics (1972) / Rock and Roll Forever (1972)
- (1992) Pops In Japan Box (Toshiba-EMI TOCP 7145-48 Japan)
  - Pops in Japan (1967) / Pops in Japan No.2 (1968); Golden Pops (1970) / Pops in Japan '71 (1971); Pops in Japan '73 (1973); 15 Years of Japanese Pops (1975)
- (1992) Live Box (Toshiba-EMI TOCP 7125-28 Japan)
  - The Ventures in Japan (1965); All About the Ventures (1966); The Ventures on Stage Encore (1967) / Live Again! (1968); The Ventures in Tokyo '68 (1968) / Live! The Ventures (1970)
- (1992) Live Box Vol. 2 (Toshiba-EMI TOCP 7149-52 Japan)
  - The Ventures on Stage '71 (1971); The Ventures on Stage '72 (1972); The Ventures on Stage '73 Vol.1 (1973); The Ventures on Stage '73 Vol.2 (1973)
- (1993) Live Box Vol. 3 (Toshiba-EMI TOCP 7826-29 Japan)
  - The Ventures on Stage '74 Vol.1 (1974); The Ventures on Stage '74 Vol.2 (1974); The Ventures on Stage '75 Vol.1 (1975); The Ventures on Stage '75 Vol.2 (1975)
- (1993) Billboard Top Rock 'n' Roll Hits: 1957-1961
- (1993) Super Box of Rock, Vol. 2
- (1994) The Ventures EP Collection (Toshiba-EMI TOCP 8291-94 Japan)
- (1995) Rock Instrumental Classics, Vols. 1-5
- (1996) Cowabunga! The Surf Box
- (1997) 36 All Time Greatest Hits
- (1997) Born to Be Wild
- (1997) Play Guitar with the Ventures
- (1997) The Ultimate History of Rock 'N' Roll Collection
- (1998) 100 Jukebox Hits: 50's & 60's
- (1998) Yuletide Soiree Party Pack
- (1999) Endless Summer Legends, Vols. 1-3
- (1999) Hot Rod Box Set
- (2000) Brain in a Box: The Science Fiction Collection
- (2018) Nokie Edwards with The Ventures Live since 1999

== Singles ==
Singles
Titles (A-side, B-side) Both sides from same album except where indicated	Year	Peak chart positions							Label & number	Album
Titles (A-side, B-side) Both sides from same album except where indicated	Year	US	Cashbox	US AC	US Dan	US R&B	AUS	UK	Label & number	Album
"The Real McCoy" b/w "Cookies and Coke"	1960	—	—	—	—	—	—	—	Blue Horizon 100	Non-album single
"Walk Don't Run" b/w "Home"	1960	—	—	—	—	—	—	—	Blue Horizon 101	Walk, Don't Run
"Walk Don't Run" b/w "Home"	1960	2	3	—	—	13	1	8	Dolton 25	Walk, Don't Run
"Walk Don't Run" b/w "The McCoy"	1960	2	3	—	—	13	1	8	Dolton 25X	Walk, Don't Run
"Perfidia" b/w "No Trespassing" (from Walk, Don't Run)	1960	15	18	—	—	—	8	4	Dolton 28	The Ventures
"The Twomp" b/w "Heart On My Sleeve" (non-album track)	1961	—	—	—	—	—	—	—	Blue Horizon 6054	Twist Party, Volume 2
"Ram-Bunk-Shush" b/w "Lonely Heart" (from Another Smash)	1961	29	50	—	—	—	23	45	Dolton 32	The Ventures
"Lullaby of the Leaves" b/w "Ginchy"	1961	69	81	—	—	—	83	43	Dolton 41	Another Smash
"(Theme from) Silver City" b/w "Bluer Than Blue"	1961	83	76	—	—	—	41	—	Dolton 44	The Colorful Ventures
"Blue Moon" b/w "Lady of Spain" (non-album track)	1961	54	90	—	—	—	—	—	Dolton 47	The Colorful Ventures
"Yellow Jacket" b/w "Genesis" (non-album track)	1962	—	—	—	—	—	—	—	Dolton 50	The Colorful Ventures
"Instant Mashed" b/w "My Bonnie Lies" (from Twist Party, Vol. 2)	1962	104	—	—	—	—	—	—	Dolton 55	Mashed Potatoes and Gravy
"Lolita Ya-Ya" b/w "Lucille" (from Mashed Potatoes and Gravy)	1962	61	100	—	—	—	—	—	Dolton 60	Going to the Ventures' Dance Party
"The 2,000 Pound Bee (Part 1)" / "The 2,000 Pound Bee (Part 2)"	1962	— 91	— 94	— —	— —	— —	— —	— —	Dolton 67	Non-album single
"El Cumbanchero" b/w "Skip to M'Limbo"	1963	— 114	— —	— —	— —	— —	— 88	— —	Dolton 68	Non-album single
"The Ninth Wave" b/w "Damaged Goods" (non-album track)	1963	122	—	—	—	—	26	—	Dolton 78	Surfing with the Ventures
"The Savage" b/w "The Chase"	1963	—	—	—	—	—	—	—	Dolton 85	Non-album single
"Journey to the Stars" b/w "Walkin' with Pluto"	1963	—	—	—	—	—	—	—	Dolton 91	The Fabulous Ventures
"Fugitive" b/w "Scratchin'"	1964	126	—	—	—	—	—	—	Dolton 94	The Fabulous Ventures
"Walk Don't Run '64" b/w "The Cruel Sea" (from The Fabulous Ventures)	1964	8	9	—	—	—	22	—	Dolton 96	Walk, Don't Run Volume 2
"Memphis" b/w "San Antonio Rose" (from The Ventures Play the Country Classics)	1964	—	—	—	—	—	44	—	Dolton 101	Let's Go!
"Slaughter on Tenth Avenue" b/w "Rap City" (from Walk, Don't Run Volume 2)	1964	35; 135	48 —	— —	— —	— —	59	— —	Dolton 300	The Ventures Knock Me Out!
"Diamond Head" b/w "Lonely Girl" (from The Ventures Knock Me Out!)	1965	70	96	—	—	—	94	—	Dolton 303	Walk, Don't Run Volume 2
"Pedal Pusher" b/w "The Swingin' Creeper" (from The Ventures a Go-Go)	1965	—	—	—	—	—	—	—	Dolton 306	Walk, Don't Run Volume 2
"Bird Rockers" b/w "Ten Seconds to Heaven" (non-album track)	1965	—	—	—	—	—	—	—	Dolton 308	The Ventures Knock Me Out!
"La Bamba" b/w "Gemini" (non-album track)	1965	—	—	—	—	—	—	—	Dolton 311	The Ventures a Go-Go
"Sleigh Ride" b/w "Snow Flakes"	1965	—	—	—	—	—	—	—	Dolton 312	The Ventures’ Christmas Album
"Secret Agent Man" b/w "00-711"	1966	54	74	—	—	—	—	—	Dolton 316	Batman Theme
"Blue Star" b/w "Comin' Home Baby" (non-album track)	1966	120	81	—	—	—	—	—	Dolton 320	Walk, Don't Run Volume 2
"Arabesque" b/w "Ginza Lights" (from Go with the Ventures)	1966	—	—	—	—	—	—	—	Dolton 321	Non-album single
"Green Hornet Theme" b/w "Fuzzy and Wild" (from Wild Things!)	1966	116	—	—	—	—	—	—	Dolton 323	Batman Theme
"Wild Thing" b/w "Penetration" (from The Ventures in Space)	1966	116	—	—	—	—	—	—	Dolton 325	Wild Things!
"Theme from 'The Wild Angels'" b/w "Kickstand" (non-album track)	1967	110	—	—	—	—	—	—	Dolton 327	Guitar Freakout
"Strawberry Fields Forever" b/w "Endless Dream"	1967	—	—	—	—	—	—	—	Liberty 55967	Super Psychedelics
"Theme from 'Endless Summer'" b/w "Strawberry Fields Forever" (from Super Psychedelics)	1967	106	—	—	—	—	—	—	Liberty 55977	Non-album single
"On the Road" b/w "Mirrors and Shadows" (originally released as "Reflections" on Super Psychedelics)	1967	—	—	—	—	—	—	—	Liberty 56007	Non-album single
"Flights of Fantasy" b/w "Vibrations" (from Super Psychedelics)	1968	—	—	—	—	—	—	—	Liberty 56019	Flights of Fantasy
"Walk, Don't Run/Land Of 1,000 Dances" b/w "Too Young to Know My Mind" (non-album track)	1968	—	—	—	—	—	—	—	Liberty 56044	The Horse
"Hawaii Five-O" b/w "Soul Breeze" (from The Horse)	1968	4	6	8	—	—	—	—	Liberty 56068	Hawaii Five-O
"Theme from A Summer Place" b/w "A Summer Love" (non-album track)	1969	83	63	17	—	—	—	—	Liberty 56115	Hawaii Five-O
"Swan Lake" b/w "Expo Seven-O" (originally released in Japan as "Kyoto Doll")	1970	—	—	—	—	—	—	—	Liberty 56153	Non-album single
"The Wanderer" b/w "The Mercenary"	1970	—	—	—	—	—	—	—	Liberty 56169	Non-album single
"Storefront Lawyers" b/w "Kern County Line"	1970	—	—	—	—	—	—	—	Liberty 56189	Non-album single
"Indian Sun" b/w "Squaw Man" (non-album track)	1971	—	—	—	—	—	—	—	United Artists 50800	Theme from "Shaft"
"Joy" b/w "Cherries Jubilee" (from Theme From "Shaft")	1971	109	—	—	—	—	90	—	United Artists 50872	Joy: The Ventures Play the Classics
"Honky Tonk (Part I)" b/w "Honky Tonk (Part II)"	1972	—	—	—	—	—	—	—	United Artists 50925	Rock and Roll Forever
"Last Tango in Paris" b/w "Prima Vera" (non-album track)	1973	—	—	—	—	—	—	—	United Artists 207	Only Hits!
"Skylab (Passport to the Future)" b/w "The Little People"	1973	—	—	38	—	—	—	—	United Artists 277	Non-album single
"Also Sprach Zarathustra (2001)" b/w "The Cisco Kid"	1973	—	—	—	—	—	—	—	United Artists 333	Only Hits!
"Main Theme from 'The Young and the Restless'" b/w "Elise" (from "Fur Elise") (from Joy: The Ventures Play the Classics)	1974	—	—	47	—	—	—	—	United Artists 392	T.V. Themes
"Theme from 'Airport 1975'" b/w "The Man with the Golden Gun"	1975	—	—	—	11	—	—	—	United Artists 578	Now Playing
"Superstar Revue" b/w "Superstar Revue (Disco Version)"	1975	—	—	—	3	—	—	—	United Artists 687	Rocky Road
"Moonlight Serenade" b/w "Moonlight Serenade (Disco Version)"	1976	—	—	—	11	—	—	—	United Artists 784	Rocky Road
"Theme from 'Charlie's Angels'" b/w "Theme from 'Starsky & Hutch'"	1977	—	—	—	—	—	—	—	United Artists 942	T.V. Themes
"Walk, Don't Run '77" b/w "Amanda's Theme"	1977	—	—	—	—	—	—	—	United Artists 1100	Non-album single
"Surfin' and Spyin'" b/w "Showdown at Newport (aka Black Sand Beach)"	1981	—	—	—	—	—	—	—	Tridex 501	Non-album single
"Ventures 25 Medley" b/w "Blue Dawn" (from Stars on Guitars EP)	1982	—	—	—	—	—	—	—	Tridex 502	Non-album single
"Rudolph the Red-Nosed Reindeer" b/w "Depression" (by Johnny & The Dwellers)	1994	—	—	—	—	—	—	—	EMI 19949	Non-album single
"Rudolph the Red Nosed Reindeer" b/w "Frosty the Snowman" (by Jan & Dean)	1997	—	—	—	—	—	—	—	EMI 19770	Non-album single
"Surf On Guitar Medley" CD single, paired with "Interview with the Ventures"	1997	—	—	—	—	—	—	—	GNP Crescendo 1411	Wild Again!
"—" denotes a recording that did not chart or was not released in that territory.

=== Reissue singles ===
- "Walk Don't Run" / "Ram-Bunk-Shush" — Liberty All-Time Hit Series 54518
- "Perfidia" / "Blue Moon" — Liberty All-Time Hit Series 54519
- "Telstar" / "Out of Limits" — Liberty All-Time Hit Series 54542
- "Wipe Out" / "Secret Agent Man" — Liberty All-Time Hit Series 54557
- "The Lonely Bull" / "Tequila" — Liberty All-Time Hit Series 54563
- "Hawaii Five-O" / "Classical Gas" — Liberty All-Time Hit Series 54571
- "Walk Don't Run" / "Ram-Bunk-Shush" — United Artists Silver Spotlight Series 050
- "Perfidia" / "Telstar" — United Artists Silver Spotlight Series 051
- "Walk Don't Run '64" / "Hawaii Five-O" — United Artists Silver Spotlight Series 052
- "Wipe Out" / "Nadia's Theme (The Young and The Restless)" — United Artists Silver Spotlight Series 1161
- "Walk Don't Run" / "Hawaii Five-O" — Collectable Record Back To Back Hit Series COL 6139

== Soundtracks ==
- (1986) Television's Greatest Hits, Vol. 1
- (1993) This Boy's Life
- (1996) Very Brady Sequel
- (2000) Cinemadness: Cool Songs From Hot Flicks
- (2000) Movie Madness: Cool Songs From Hot Flicks
- (2000) Tao of Steve
- (2001) 61*
