= General Álvarez =

General Álvarez may refer to:

- Donato Álvarez (1825–1913), Argentine general
- Gregorio Conrado Álvarez (1925–2016), Uruguayan Army general
- Juan Antonio Álvarez de Arenales (1770–1831), Argentine and Bolivian general
- Juan Álvarez (1790–1867), Mexican general
- Mariano Álvarez (1818–1924), Filipino revolutionary general
- Pascual Álvarez (1861–1923), Filipino revolutionary general
- Santiago Álvarez (general) (1872–1930), Filipino revolutionary general
