= Nadia's Theme =

1971 music composition by Barry De Vorzon and Perry Botkin Jr.

"Nadia's Theme", originally titled "Cotton's Dream", is a piece of music composed by Barry De Vorzon and Perry Botkin Jr. in 1971. It was originally part of the soundtrack music of the 1971 Stanley Kramer film Bless the Beasts and Children, and became better known as the theme music to the television soap opera The Young and the Restless since the series premiered in 1973. Later, "Cotton's Dream" was given the informal name "Nadia's Theme" after it became associated with Olympic gymnast Nadia Comăneci during and after the 1976 Summer Olympics.

The piece was first released on disc as part of the 1971 OST Bless the Beasts and Children soundtrack, then a 1974 cover version by easy listening group Sounds of Sunshine was produced. After it became associated with Comăneci during the 1976 Olympics, the piece was later released as a single in August of that year. Other versions of "Nadia's Theme" have since been recorded. The piece has also been sampled by other artists, and has been used regularly by other radio and television programs.

== Origins ==
De Vorzon and Botkin Jr. composed this piece of music, originally titled "Cotton's Dream", as part of the soundtrack music for the 1971 feature film Bless the Beasts and Children. The instrumental version was commercially released on that film's soundtrack album on A&M Records. The movie's soundtrack music included the eponymous opening title song performed by The Carpenters; the OST album later in 1971 featured "Lost" (at 9:20), a song set to the same melody, performed by Renée Armand. The single release, under the new title, was electronically patched to extend the song by almost a minute for commercial airplay.

In 1973, Botkin Jr. composed a rearranged version of the instrumental theme for the long-running television soap opera The Young and the Restless, which premiered on March 26, 1973, on CBS. Although a soundtrack album for the television series was released by P.I.P. Records in 1974, the LP only contained a vocal cover version by easy listening group Sounds of Sunshine, rather than the original recording by De Vorzon and Botkin.

== Association with Nadia Comăneci ==
In late July or early August 1976, ABC's sports anthology program Wide World of Sports produced a montage of Romanian gymnast Nadia Comăneci's routines during the 1976 Summer Olympics and used "Cotton's Dream" as the background music. It was this national television montage that cemented the association of the tune with Comăneci in the public's mind, as Comăneci herself never performed her floor exercises using this piece of music— rather, she had used a piano arrangement of a medley of the songs "Yes Sir, That's My Baby" and "Jump in the Line".

On November 23, 1976, CBS further entrenched the tune's association with Comăneci by using the melody in its broadcast of Nadia—From Romania with Love, a one-hour television special hosted by Flip Wilson, co-produced by CBS and Televiziunea Romana. The De Vorzon & Botkin version of the song was not released on CD until Eric Records included it on the 2003 compilation Hard to Find Orchestral Instrumentals II. An extract from the tune is used regularly as a jingle by BBC Radio 2 disc jockey Steve Wright on his Steve Wright's Sunday Love Songs.

On May 18, 1997, Nadia Comaneci and Bart Conner guest-starred in the Season 3 finale of Touched by an Angel (titled "A Delicate Balance"), during which they performed a brief floor exercise within a montage scene to "Nadia's Theme".

== 1976 releases ==
Viewer inquiries about the music from the Wide World of Sports montage prompted a commercial release of the 1971 version of the song as a single through A&M Records on August 28, 1976. This recording was identical to "Cotton's Dream," with a repeat from the bridge to the end edited in to lengthen the piece. The single was titled "Nadia's Theme (The Young and the Restless)" and was a commercial success, charting for 22 weeks and peaking at No. 8 in the Billboard Hot 100 on the week ending December 11, 1976. A&M Records failed to credit De Vorzon as the co-performer on the first pressings of the single. (He was credited as co-author and co-producer, but Botkin was the sole credited artist.) De Vorzon successfully sued the record label for $241,000. After only a few weeks in release, all miscredited early copies of "Nadia's Theme" were withdrawn, and all subsequent pressings of the single bore the artist credit "Barry De Vorzon And Perry Botkin Jr."

In October 1976, as the De Vorzon–Botkin version released by A&M climbed the charts, P.I.P. Records re-released a 1974 single containing the Sounds of Sunshine's vocal and instrumental versions under the title "Nadia's Theme". The label also re-released the 1974 soundtrack LP, now stickered to say it contained "Nadia's Theme", although it still only contained the cover version. That same month, Barry De Vorzon capitalized on the success of the song by releasing it on his first album, Nadia's Theme (The Young and the Restless). Soon after, Sounds of Sunshine released their own Nadia's Theme album.

== Chart history ==
=== Weekly charts ===
Chart (1976–77)	Peak position
Canada RPM Adult Contemporary	7
Canada RPM Top Singles	6
U.S. Billboard Hot 100	8
U.S. Billboard Adult Contemporary	8
U.S. Cash Box Top 100	5

=== Year-end charts ===
Chart (1976)	Rank
Canada	74
U.S. (Joel Whitburn's Pop Annual)	73
U.S. Cash Box	53

== Alternate versions ==
Other versions of "Nadia's Theme" have been recorded, including easy listening renditions by such artists as Ray Conniff in 1976, the orchestra of The Lawrence Welk Show in 1976, Ronnie Aldrich in 1977, Roger Williams in 1976, Richard Abel in 1992, Ferrante & Teicher, and James Galway (original release year not yet determined).

There is a semi-rock version recorded by The Ventures in 1976.

David Hasselhoff did a vocal rendition, which incorporated De Vorzon's and Botkin Jr.'s lyrics, performed on The Merv Griffin Show in 1977 and released on his 1987 album Lovin' Feelings.

The Young and the Restless began using a light remix of "Nadia's Theme" in 1988, then switched to a jazz arrangement from 1999 to 2003 before returning to the 1988 version in 2003.

The song was sampled in a piece of music from the 1993 video game Aero the Acro-Bat.

Cuban Link samples "Nadia's Theme" in their song "Flowers for the Dead on their 2000 album 24K.

R&B musician Mary J. Blige included the instrumental version as a backdrop in her 2001 single, "No More Drama". Botkin, who had never heard of Blige prior to this was delighted to get a writing credit, saying: "I woke up one morning and I'm on the cutting edge of R&B," says the composer, who now specializes in electronic music. "These days, I'm completely removed from pop music—except when [royalty] checks arrive."

Sonshine Media Network International in the Philippines used the piece as background music following a series of montages for the Glory Mountain in Mt. Apo, Davao City.

== Awards ==
Grammy Awards:

- Grammy Award for Best Instrumental Arrangement, 1978
