= Barry Robins =

American actor

- Born: January 12, 1945; Brooklyn, New York
- Died: April 1, 1986 (aged 41); Los Angeles, California
- Occupation(s): Stage, film, television actor

Barry Robins (January 12, 1945 – April 1, 1986), was an American stage, film and television actor. He was best known for his leading role as Cotton in Stanley Kramer's 1971 movie, Bless the Beasts and Children.

== Early life ==
Born in Brooklyn, he attended New York's High School of Performing Arts, and later studied acting with Stella Adler and singing with Ruth Miller. His Chicago performance as the Crown Prince in a 1963 production of The King and I led its composer, Richard Rodgers, to invite him to reprise the role in the 1964 revival in New York at Lincoln Center. He would eventually play the part more than 600 times in various regional and touring productions.

== Career ==
He appeared around the country in many other musicals, among which his roles included Little Jake in Annie Get Your Gun, Mordred and Tom of Warwick in Camelot, Adi in Milk and Honey, Cesario in Fanny, Dromio of Ephesus in Boys From Syracuse, and Evil Eye Fleagle in Li'l Abner. His roles in dramatic plays included Nick in A Thousand Clowns and the Boy in Incident at Vichy. In Colorado, he also had the speaking role of Puck in Britten's opera A Midsummer Night's Dream, and a few cameos at the Metropolitan Opera in New York.

On television, he appeared as Mahatma Gandhi in A Night in Maritzburg, as the teenage Munya in Actor: The Paul Muni Story, and on the series Twelve O'Clock High, Columbo, The Girl from U.N.C.L.E., and Rat Patrol. On the first season DVD of The Monkees, his name is listed as one of the unsuccessful applicants for a position in the series and band.

In 1977, Robins penned Our Days at M.A.D., an unproduced teleplay based on his experiences at the High School of Performing Arts. From time to time he also performed as a cocktail lounge pianist.

== Death ==
Robins died of complications from AIDS in Los Angeles on April 1, 1986.

== Filmography ==
| Year | Title | Role | Notes |
|---|---|---|---|
| 1971 | Bless the Beasts and Children | Cotton | |
