= Bless the Beasts and Children (novel) =

Book by Glendon Swarthout

- First edition cover
- Author: Glendon Swarthout
- Publisher: Doubleday
- Publication date: March 13, 1970

Bless the Beasts and Children is a 1970 novel by American writer Glendon Swarthout. It tells the story of several emotionally disturbed boys away at summer camp who unite to stop a buffalo hunt. The 151-page (192 pages in paperback, first edition) book covers some social issues of the 1960s and 1970s. It was published by Doubleday.

An unabridged audiobook recording of the novel was released in 2005 by Books on Tape and read by Scott Brick.

== Plot ==
Six emotionally disturbed teenaged boys are sent from their homes throughout the United States by their affluent parents to Box Canyon Boys Camp near Prescott, Arizona, as the camp's slogan is "Send us a boy – we'll send you a cowboy", and the parents hope that the camp will mature the boys.

Each having originally been assigned to one of the six cabins, they are quickly cast out by the other campers and find themselves together in one cabin. After a contest between the six cabins sorts out the pecking order, their cabin predictably lands in last place. The boys, in accordance with the camp rules, do manage to raid all of the superior cabins and conquer their trophies so as to advance in rank, but they use badly executed subterfuge that is looked down upon by the other campers.

Five of the six cabins are named after various American Indian tribes and awarded mounted animal heads corresponding to each of the cabins' ranks, which are, from highest to lowest:

- Apache – bull buffalo
- Sioux – mountain lion
- Comanches – black bear
- Cheyenne – bobcat
- Navajo – pronghorn
- Bedwetters – chamberpot

All of the Bedwetters refer to one another by last names, including the two Lally brothers, who are referred to as Lally 1 and Lally 2, although their first names are known.

An unpleasant confrontation between the boys and their counselor, resulting from the counselor's attempt to molest the youngest of the boys, ends with Teft breaking into their counselor's footlocker, finding whiskey, beer, cigarettes, and pornography. This find allows the Bedwetters to blackmail the counselor, who is called "Wheaties", into taking them to a ranch, where they witness a canned hunt of surplus bison rounded up from the surrounding area. The hunters (who won their spots at that hunt by lottery) stand or even sit along a fence, shooting at the fenced-in, nearly tame bison.

When the boys return, disgusted at the slaughter, they decide to break out of camp that night to stop the canned hunt. They ride horses into town, where Teft hot-wires an old truck. After a ride into Flagstaff, Arizona, on U.S. Route 66, they enter an all-night eatery for food but are accosted by two "redneck" types, who follow them away from the restaurant and force their truck to the side, where they discover it is hot-wired. Teft pulls a .22-caliber rifle from the back of the truck and shoots out a tire on the car driven by the men harassing the boys, then orders the men to start walking or "wear earrings".

Cotton and the other boys climb back into the truck and continue their journey to the ranch, but run out of gas just before reaching their destination. They walk the rest of the way and make their way through the fence maze on the ranch until they manage to open the exit gate so the bison can escape. However, the bison are content to stay until Teft hot-wires a state-owned truck and Cotton drives into the herd of buffalo while blowing the truck's horn, which alerts the hunters who are camped out nearby. Cotton drives the truck through the herd of buffalo and over the edge of the Mogollon Rim to his death, and the hunters surround the other boys.

== Movie rights ==
A bidding war occurred later that year over the film rights, eventually won by Stanley Kramer. Kramer negotiated with Columbia Pictures for the right to produce and direct the film, which made its world premiere at the Berlin Film Festival in August 1971 as the United States' entry in the international competition.
