= Sounds of Sunshine =

American sunshine pop group

Sounds of Sunshine were an American sunshine pop group from Los Angeles, California consisting of three brothers. The group released one album on Ranwood Records in 1971, which peaked on the Billboard 200 at #187. Its title track, "Love Means (You Never Have to Say You're Sorry)", was a minor U.S. hit, peaking at #39 on the Billboard Hot 100 chart. The song found a much wider audience among adults, reaching #5 on Billboard's Easy Listening survey. In Canada, the song reached #45 on the Pop chart and #33 Adult Contemporary. The title of the song was taken from a line from the 1970 film Love Story. Their debut album was followed by three more albums as well as numerous singles.

On the back cover of Dead Kennedys' Fresh Fruit for Rotting Vegetables album, a press shot of the group found by bassist Klaus Flouride at a garage sale (without anything identifying the people in the photo as the members of the group) was used without their permission; the group subsequently sued band member Jello Biafra's label Alternative Tentacles, and received a $3000 payment and alterations to be made to the album art.

== Members ==
- Walt Wilder
- Warner Wilder
- George Wilder
