= 1967 coho salmon fishing disaster =

Weather event in the United States

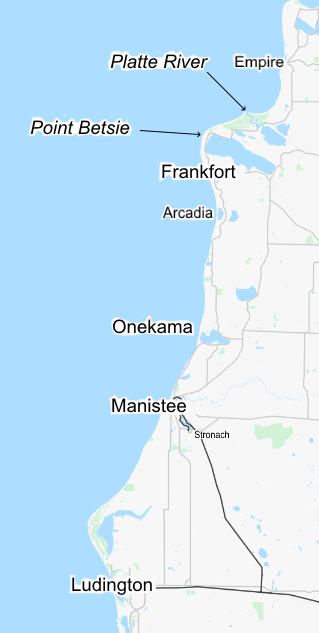
- Michigan shoreline where the disaster occurred

Meteorological history
- Formed: September 23, 1967

Squall
- Highest winds: 40 miles per hour (64 km/h)

Overall effects
- Fatalities: 7
- Injuries: 46
- Damage: More than 150 small fishing boats capsized
- Areas affected: Lake Michigan, Michigan

The 1967 Coho Salmon Fishing Disaster (Note: This is the name the U.S. Department of Transportation used in its annual report, which covered the disaster.) refers to a squall over Lake Michigan, off the coast of Michigan in the United States, which occurred on September 23, 1967. Hundreds of small fishing boats were on the lake to take advantage of a coho salmon run. More than 150 boats capsized, seven people died, and 46 people were injured.

== Background ==
Freshly caught coho salmon

In 1965, the state of Michigan decided to stock rivers that ran into Lake Michigan with coho salmon in an attempt to reduce the population of alewives, then considered a "trash fish". (Note: Coho salmon were introduced to Lake Michigan on the orders of Michigan state fisheries chief Howard Tanner and his chief assistant, Wayne Tody. Tanner has long claimed the salmon were stocked to create a sport fishing industry, not to solve the alewife problem. Nearly all media reports at the time, and since, have said the aim was to control alewife. Typical is this statement from the Flint Journal newspaper: "They were introduced into the lake in an effort to reduce the exploding population of alewives, a salt water trash fish that infilitrated the Great Lakes.") About 660,000 coho salmon fingerlings were planted in 1966. The coho salmon fishery was well-established by 1967, with state biologists reporting that survivability of the 1966 plantings had exceeded expectations.

Although the state's first coho salmon fishing season opened April 1, the 1966 coho salmon plantings were not expected to make a big run until the fall of 1967. (At the time, Michigan state law forbade the commercial harvesting of salmon.)

== Coho fever ==
=== Spring fishing success ===
The success of coho salmon fishermen around the Upper Peninsula of Michigan in April and May created much anticipation among fishermen in lower Michigan, where the salmon would move in the fall. The Michigan State Department of Conservation encouraged the excitement by experimenting with catching methods and equipment, and reporting the results to anglers (almost none of whom in Michigan had any experience with fishing for salmon). (Note: Salmon kept by fishermen had to be a minimum of 7 inches (180 mm) in length. Fishermen had a total seasonal limit ("creel limit") of 10 coho salmon from streams, and five from the lake. In a single day, a fisherman could catch no more than 10 pounds (4.5 kg) of salmon, plus one more fish. Coho proved so large, however, that the state eased its rules on September 7. Fishermen could now have up to two days' worth of catch in their possession. They could catch up to two coho salmon a day, each weighing more than 10 pounds each.) The department assigned two patrol boats to keep tabs on the coho as they moved south, and reported findings daily to fishermen. Anticipation by fishermen for near-shore coho angling rose all throughout the summer of 1967. Fishermen throughout the Midwest believed the best fishing in the nation would occur in Lake Michigan.

The coho were slow to move toward shore; state experts said on August 2 that good near-shore fishing would probably begin in late August. By Labor Day weekend (September 1 to 4), good coho fishing could be had just 1 to 2 miles (1.6 to 3.2 km) offshore, and many schools could be found just 660 to 900 feet (200 to 270 m) from shore.

=== Coho fever begins ===
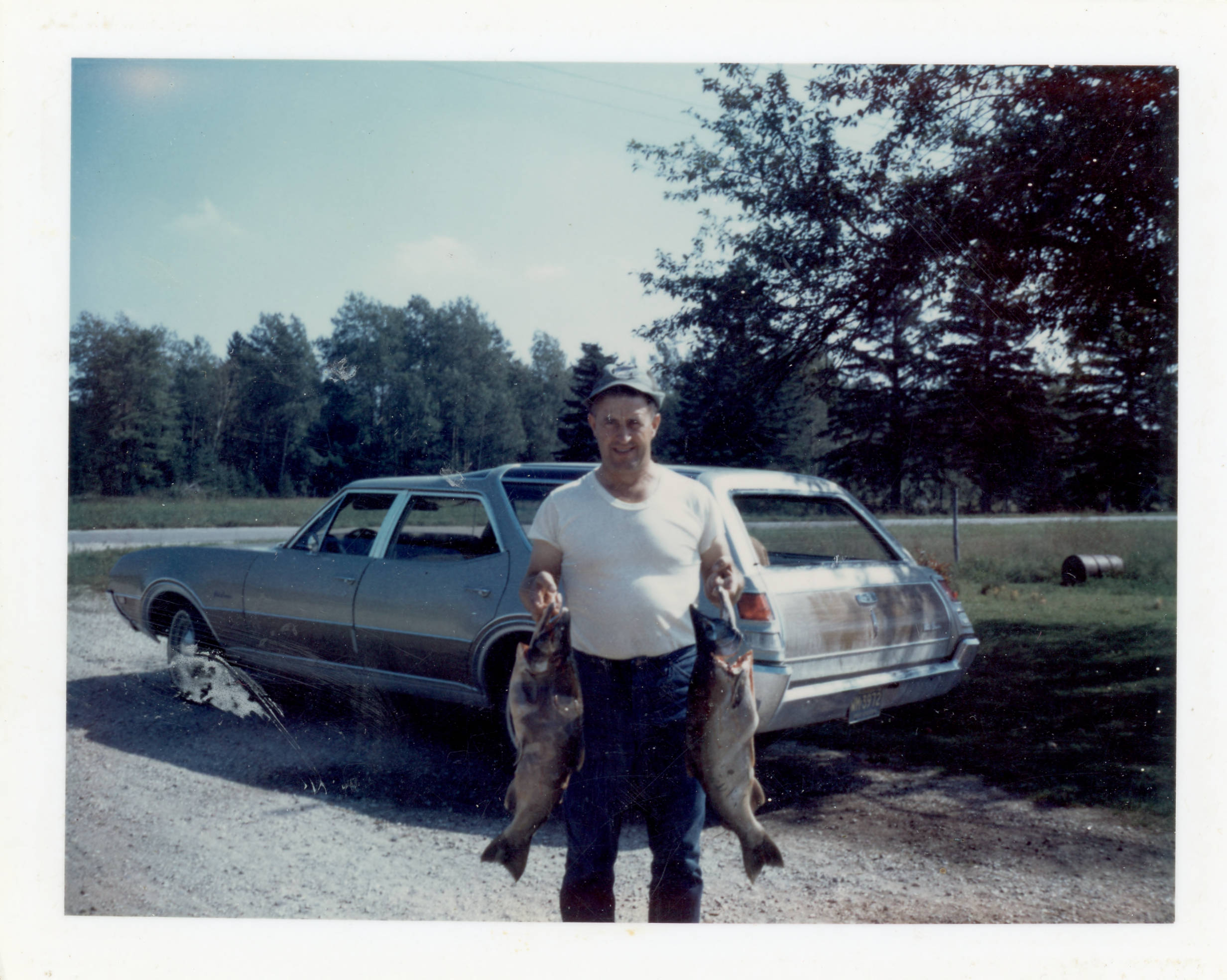
Photograph of Willard Schaedig with two Coho Salmon he caught, summer 1968 (Presque Isle County Historical Museum)

"Coho fever" struck Michigan. By late August, hundreds of anglers were crowding the lake off the towns of Frankfort, Manistee, and Onekama in northern lower Michigan every weekend. The week of August 28, at least 50 coho fishing boats could be seen on the water each weekday. On Thursday, August 30 (the Thursday before the Labor Day weekend), at least 315 boats were counted offshore.

The Detroit Free Press estimated that 19,000 anglers were on the water fishing for coho on Labor Day weekend. Cars with license plates from all over the Midwest were seen in Manistee. There were 600 to 800 small boats on the water off Manistee on Sunday, September 3, and Monday, September 4. Traffic clogged the roads around Frankfort, Manistee, and Onekama. No boats were available for hire for miles along the coast from Sleeping Bear Bay south to Ludington. Fishing guides in the Manistee area had been booked for more than a year, and boat rentals could not be had. Hotel reservations were very difficult to get in Benzie County, where the Platte River emptied into Lake Michigan, and sporting goods stores in Manistee ran out of bait, lures, rods, and tackle. Boat launching sites and marinas at Frankfort, Manistee, and the mouth of the Platte River were overwhelmed.

The United States Coast Guard expressed concern that coho anglers were not observing water safety rules. Most fishermen were in poorly-powered watercraft less than 18 feet (5.5 m) in length. (Note: State of Michigan boating safety agencies recommended that Lake Michigan anglers use a boat at least 16 feet (4.9 m) in length.) Boats under 18 feet could not handle the large lake swells, and could be easily swamped due to low freeboard. Anglers used airboats, cabin cruisers, canoes, houseboats, prams, sailboats, car-top dinghies, kayaks, and rubber rafts to fish on the lake. One Coast Guard employee saw a man fishing using pontoons lashed together with rope, and a few boards on top for seating. Many boats had motors too under-powered for choppy lake weather.

The fishing was heavy Labor Day weekend, but state officials said the coho run would not peak until some time between mid September and the first week of October.

=== Coho fever continues in September ===
The second weekend of September (September 8 to 10) proved even more popular for coho anglers. An estimated 38,000 coho salmon anglers were on the water that weekend, trolling between Manistee and the Platte River. From 800 to 1,000 boats jammed the waters the week of September 11 to 14 at Manistee, while 1,500 to 1,700 vessels could be found there the weekend of September 15 to 17. Cars with license plates from all over the nation were seen in Frankfort and Manistee, and more than 450 boats were counted off Manistee on Sunday, September 10. A line 20 vehicles long backed up at the public boat launch in Manistee. In Stronach Township, the state of Michigan leased a plot of land and created a 150-car parking lot and temporary access to the lake to accommodate demand. Boat launching sites were still so packed, many anglers had taken to launching canoes and car-top boats from the beach. The channel connecting Manistee Lake with Lake Michigan was so clogged with boat traffic that the Coast Guard found it difficult to get their own boats to Lake Michigan. The channel was so full, one Coast guardsman said, "I bet I could of walked the 100 yards across it by stepping from boat to boat." Area restaurants were receiving deliveries of food three times a day to keep up with demand, there were long lines at gas stations, and sporting goods stores as far away as Detroit were low on many items. No boating equipment could be found for sale in Manistee.

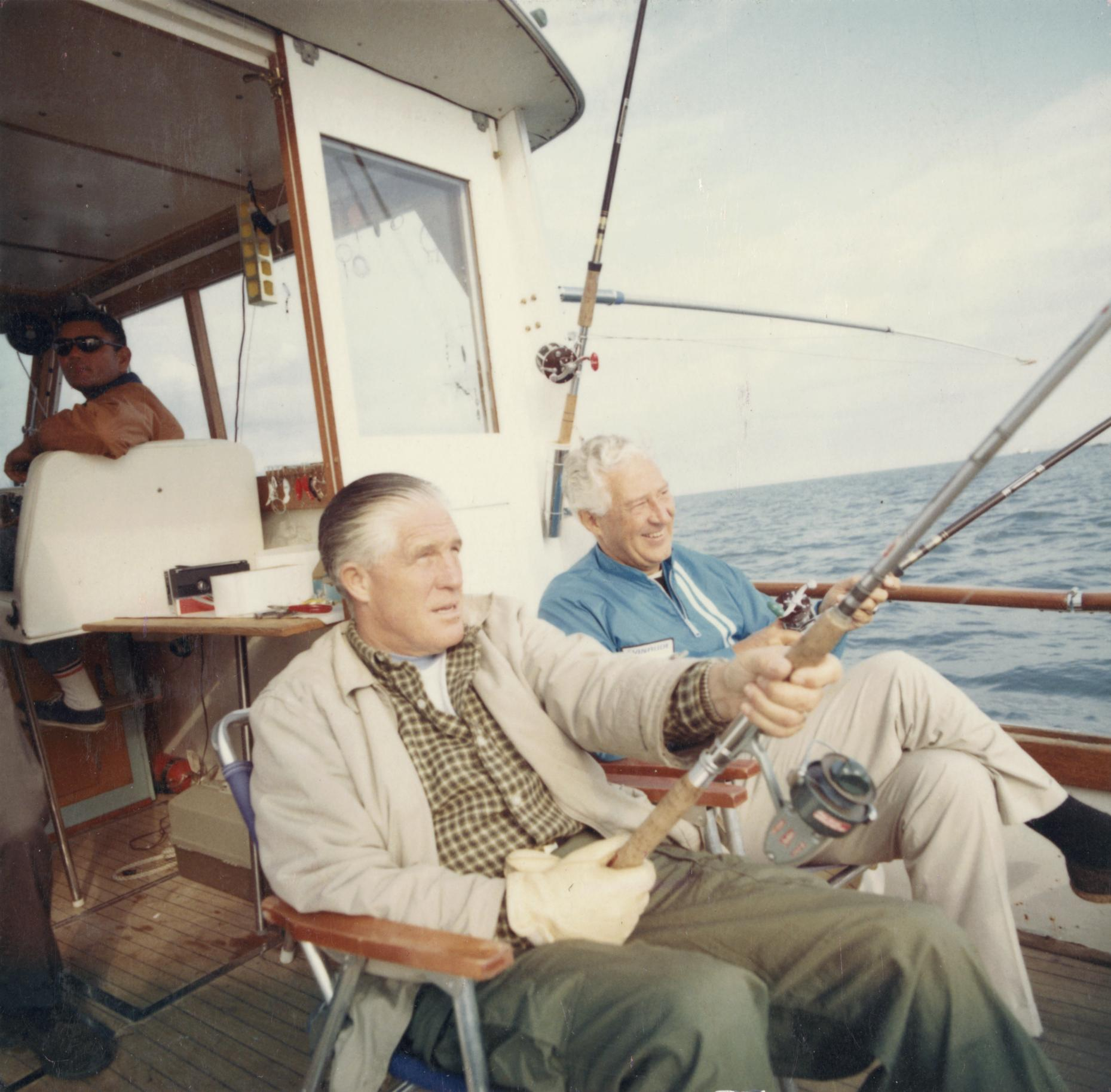
Michigan governor George W. Romney and Wisconsin governor Warren P. Knowles trolling for Coho salmon in Lake Michigan off Manistee in September 1968

The Coast Guard and state boating safety experts reiterated that they remained apprehensive about the safety of many of the boats being used. "Coho fishing is presenting serious safety problems," said Robert Dyke, marine program supervisor for the boat and water safety division of the Michigan state department of conservation. The Coast Guard station at Manistee, which usually had six rescue calls a year, had 40 such calls since Labor Day. (Note: An unknown number of anglers were rescued by private boat owners.) The Coast Guard warned fishermen to be alert for squalls, avoid overloading, and to have a compass and distress flares on board. Some boats were going as far as 8 miles (13 km) offshore, taking unsafe, ill-equipped watercraft far beyond the point of safe return in case of a change of weather. Seven boats sank in the area between September 1 and 15, and 25 to 30 had capsized between September 1 and September 30. In the past two weeks, the Coast Guard had issued 500 citations for various safety and regulatory violations to coho fishermen, and towed a few boats with dead motors from quite a distance offshore.

Michigan's "coho fever" in 1967 drew national media attention, including a Sports Illustrated magazine cover.

Fishing pressure remained high the second week of September (September 13 to 14), with at least 550 boats a day counted off Manistee. That weekend (September 15 to 17), more than 1,000 boats were counted off Manistee on Saturday and 1,500 boats on Sunday. At Frankfort on Saturday, a traffic jam backed up for 2 miles (3.2 km) as anglers tried to use the public boat launch facilities. Tom Lewis, president of Manistee Chamber of Commerce, called it a "madhouse".

The September 15 to 17 weekend had seen some of the best coho salmon fishing of the season, and only served to heighten interest by anglers.

The week of September 18 to 22, there were roughly 1,000 boats a day on the water between Manistee and Frankfort, where the best coho salmon fishing could be found along a 30-mile (48 km) stretch of coast. Another 1,000 vessels were counted in the waters off the mouth of the Platte River. Although excellent coho angling could be found off Manistee, Onekama, and Frankfort, the best fishing was found several miles off Arcadia, luring boaters far out onto the lake. (Note: The Manistee Chamber of Commerce estimated that city businesses had seen a 250 to 300 percent increase in sales, and hotel and motel income was up 1,200 percent. Sales of gasoline mixed with oil (used in motor boats) had increased 500 percent, while gasoline sales along were up 300 percent. A gas station which might pump 800 US gallons (3,000 L; 670 imp gal) on a weekend was now pumping 2,000 US gallons (7,600 L; 1,700 imp gal). Restaurant income was up 280 to 310 percent on Saturdays. No boats were available for rental, and most stores ran out of food, supplies, and fishing tackle on weekends. With high school and college youth back at school, most businesses were running on a skeleton staff. Some staff were working 16 hours a day.)

A columnist for the Battle Creek Enquirer newspaper warned that there were "too many fishermen seeking coho who never fished anything bigger than lakes close to home". The schooling off Arcadia worried the Coast Guard, which said the biggest problem was boaters going too far out in boats that were too small. Some small boats were going out as far as 9 miles (14 km).

== Squall ==
=== Small craft warnings ===
Small craft advisory pennant

The second full week of September had seen chilly overnight temperatures and stronger winds, but Lake Michigan was seeing unusually calm weather. On September 20, daytime temperatures rose from the mid 60sF to about 80F (from 18.3C to 26.6C). Coho salmon moved from about 5 feet (1.5 m) below the surface to about 25 feet (7.6 m) below, seeking cooler water.

The forecast for Saturday, September 23, was good. The day before, the National Weather Service predicted partly cloudy skies with temperatures around 70 °F (21 °C). North winds would be variable, with a chance of showers in late afternoon or early evening. Precipitation would be 0.3 to 0.1 inches (7.6 to 2.5 mm). The morning of Saturday, September 23, the forecast remained almost the same. Weather was mostly fair, with a high around 70 °F (21 °C) and southerly winds 10 to 22 miles per hour (16 to 35 km/h), becoming stronger toward evening.

However, winds were strong enough that the National Weather Service issued a small craft warning on Thursday, September 21. The warning remained in effect on September 22 and September 23. The Coast Guard had worked hard all month to ensure that all fishermen were warned to look for the red triangular flag which meant a small craft warning. (Note: Small craft are those 16 feet (4.9 m) and shorter.) But many fishermen did not heed the squall warnings.

About 9,000 fishermen in roughly 700 to 1,000 boats were estimated to have gone coho salmon fishing off Manistee and Frankfort on Saturday, September 23. The Battle Creek Enquirer and Saginaw News newspapers said most of the boats were 12 to 20 feet (3.7 to 6.1 m) in length, while the New York Daily News quoted an unidentified local police department as saying most were 14 to 18 feet (4.3 to 5.5 m). The Grand Rapids Press, however, said most of the watercraft were less than 16 feet (4.9 m) in length, and many were 10 feet (3.0 m) or less. Some people were seen that morning fishing from small outboard-powered rowboats and from canoes. Many boats lacked life preservers, and had only 3 to 5 horsepower (2.2 to 3.7 kW) motors.

=== The storm hits ===
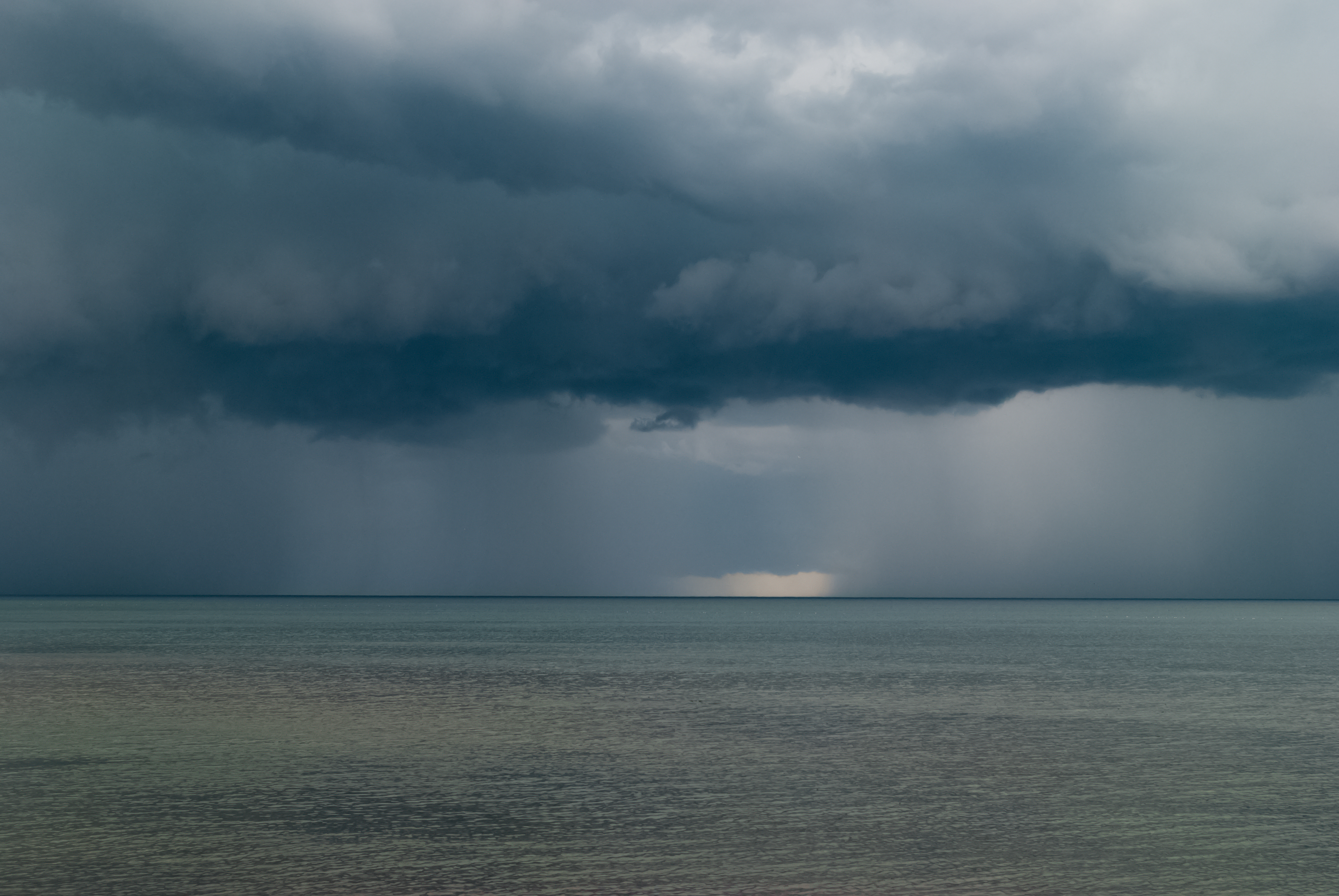
Storm over Lake Michigan in 2014

The small craft warning on September 23 was made at 8 a.m., yet hundreds of boats went out on Lake Michigan even after it was made. Some waves were as much as 8 feet (2.4 m) high by 10 a.m. A 16-foot (4.9 m) boat with a 75 horsepower (56 kW) motor headed for shore at 10 a.m. but was swamped. Another small craft with an 18 horsepower (13 kW) engine took 30 minutes to get just 0.25 miles (0.40 km) to shore. Lake waters were dangerously rough by 10:30 a.m., and Michigan State Police were sent to the shoreline where they used bullhorns to urge fishermen to return to shore. The Battle Creek Enquirer reported, however, that the storm seemed to come on suddenly.

The storm came out of the southwest, began at about 9 a.m., increased in intensity gradually, and broke in earnest at noon, affecting 40 miles (64 km) of the Michigan coast. Winds up to 40 miles per hour (64 km/h) and waves 10 to 15 feet (3.0 to 4.6 m) high were recorded. (Note: The Chicago Tribune reported waves as high as 25 feet (7.6 m).) Rain was so heavy that visibility was zero for two hours. Some boats kept fishing even as waves 12 feet (3.7 m) in height broke over them. The rain slowed at 4 p.m. but waves remained 4 to 5 feet (1.2 to 1.5 m) in height and rescue was nearly impossible.

Most of the boats off Manistee made it safely to shore.

Most of the boats off Frankfort did not. There were between 200 and 500 boats off Frankfort, and most of these attempted to seek shelter by rounding Point Betsie. They did not make it by the time the storm hit. A sandbar about 400 feet (120 m) off the mouth of the Platte River made landings difficult there, and especially hazardous in rough weather. Boats that turned south to try to reach Frankfort ran into winds reaching up to 30 miles per hour (48 km/h) and waves 25 feet (7.6 m) high.

The Coast Guard said that most of the boats headed for shore as soon as it was clear that the squall was headed their way, but they started for shore too late to avoid it. Three hours after the storm hit, small boats were still streaming into local harbors.

=== Rescue efforts ===
Scores of boats were beached all along the shore from Manistee to Sleeping Bear Point. More than 200 small craft beached along a 7 miles (11 km) stretch of beach at Point Betsie. Many had smashed motors and ruptured hulls. At least 65 boats came ashore near Empire, 11 miles (18 km) northwest of Point Betsie. Six men were also rescued from the water off Empire.

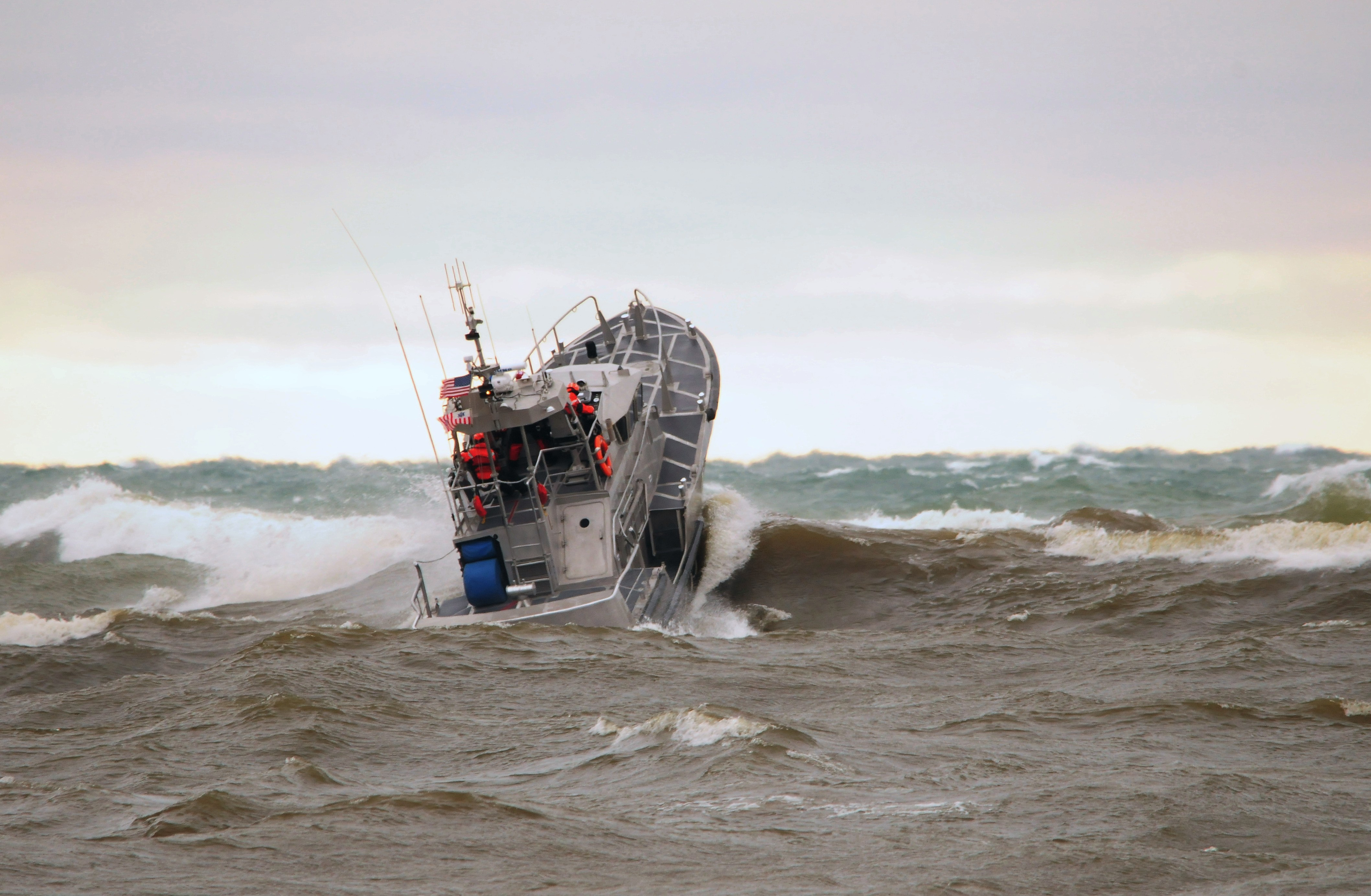
A Coast Guard 47-foot (14 m) boat trains in 11-to-13-foot (3.4 to 4.0 m) seas on Lake Michigan in November 2013

The U.S. Coast Guard, Manistee County Sheriff's Department, Benzie County Sheriff's Department, and even local police forces sent dozens of rescue workers onto the lake and along the beaches at about 4 p.m. as soon as weather permitted. On the lake, the rescue force consisted of three Coast Guard planes, four Coast Guard cutters, and two Coast Guard helicopters. They were assisted by a number of large private boats, including several big private yachts.

A Coast Guard plane reported seeing 150 small boats capsized, some of them more than 2 miles (3.2 km) from shore. At least one cabin cruiser capsized. Hundreds more were in distress. Rain and patches of fog hindered rescue efforts. A strong undertow made it very difficult to pull victims from the water. William Jacobson, owner of Jacobson's Marine in Frankfort, ventured out in a tugboat to assist with rescue efforts, and said some waves were still as much as 25 feet (7.6 m) high.

Lt. Governor William Milliken and U.S. Senator Robert P. Griffin flew to the disaster area and toured it after dark. (Note: Milliken was Acting Governor at the time, while Governor George W. Romney was making a nationwide tour of urban areas in preparation for the launch of his 1968 presidential campaign.) Michigan National Guard units at Cadillac and Manistee were ordered by Lt. Gov. Milliken to stand by. When it became clear they were not needed, they were released from duty later that evening.

At least 46 people were injured, and 10 people treated for exposure at Paul Oliver Memorial Hospital in Frankfort.

Eight people drowned. Those identified included Arthur De Hate, Donald H. Farr, William Meekhof, Sherman S. Molle, Earl H. Smith, and Bernard Van Koevering. (Note: Smith and De Hate were just 70 yards (64 m) offshore when they died. Their bodies washed ashore at Empire, and were found by a Leelanau County sheriff's deputy. Farr, Molle, and Van Koevering were all in the same boat. Their bodies were recovered by a Michigan State Police launch. Meekhof's body was brought to Frankfort by a private citizen, who had found it washed ashore.)

Two men ignored Coast Guard warnings and went out after the storm ended, but when waves were still 3 feet (0.91 m) high. Their boat capsized off Point Betsie 5 miles (8.0 km) north of Frankfort. Their screams for help were heard after dark, and a Coast Guard rescue plane was dispatched from Traverse City to find them. Once they were located, a Traverse County Sheriff's Department boat was sent to rescue them. One of the men drowned. His companion was rescued alive, but in shock from hypothermia. A boat with five fishermen also returned to the lake after the storm had ended. They were rescued by the Coast Guard at 9:30 p.m., 5 miles (8.0 km) offshore, after 3-foot (0.91 m) waves capsized their boat.

The streets of local towns were jammed with families seeking news about their loved ones.

Despite the disaster, at least 60 small craft ventured back out onto the lake near dark after the storm ended, even though waves were still 3 feet (0.91 m) high. At least 50 boats remained on the bay at the mouth of the Platte River at dusk. Hundreds of others still lolled in 5-foot (1.5 m) swells off Frankforst and Manistee at dusk.

The sun broke through briefly before twilight, helping search efforts. Waves 3 feet (0.91 m) high were still hitting the beach as late as 9 p.m., and winds as high as 28 miles per hour (45 km/h) were expected overnight.

Two Coast Guard planes and two Coast Guard helicopters continued to search Lake Michigan for victims until nightfall. Coast Guard boats also continued to search throughout the night for boats in distress as another squell approached. The Coast Guard expressed concern that boaters might try to return after dark, so the Benzie and Manistee county sheriff department and the Michigan State Police sent officers on foot and horseback and in jeeps to roam the beaches, seeking survivors. Bonfires were lit along 10 miles (16 km) of coast, to warm survivors and to serve as beacon fires for any boats still lost on the lake.

=== Aftermath ===
On September 24, 25, 26, and 27, Coast Guard aircraft flew 33 sorties and Coast Guard boats made 20 sorties in an attempt to locate all capsized or disabled craft and make any necessary rescues.

Hundreds of people remained unaccounted for after the storm. Most of them were safe on land, but had not contacted friends or family. The Coast Guard began checking boat registrations to try to account for all boats. By September 27, the Coast Guard had determined that only seven people had died. One remained unaccounted for.

The coho salmon fishing season continued for another three weeks, during which time the Coast Guard maintained daily aircraft and small boat patrols of the area.

In November 1967, the United States Department of Transportation convened a Marine Board of Investigation to investigate the tragedy. Among its findings were that many of those caught in the squall were inexperienced in fishing on Lake Michigan, and did not fully understand the risks involved or big-lake boating rules and guidelines. Those who died, and most of those rescued from the water, were not wearing life jackets.

Benzie County historian Dave Taghon released a 25-minute documentary film about the disaster in October 2011.

== Bibliography ==
- Department of Transportation (November 26, 1968). Annual Report. Part 1 — The Department. Fiscal Year 1967 (Report). Washington, D.C.: U.S. Government Printing Office.
- Parsons, John (April 1973). History of Salmon in the Great Lakes, 1850-1970. Technical Papers of the Bureau of Sport Fisheries and Wildlife (Report). Washington, D.C.: Fish & Wildlife Service, U.S. Dept. of the Interior.
