= Glendon Swarthout =

American writer (1918–1992)

- Born: Glendon Fred Swarthout; April 8, 1918; Pinckney, Michigan, U.S.
- Died: September 23, 1992 (aged 74); Scottsdale, Arizona, U.S.
- Education: BA. & MA, University of Michigan. PhD, Michigan State University.
- Occupations: Writer, novelist
- Writing career
- Language: English
- Genre: Fiction

Glendon Fred Swarthout (April 8, 1918 – September 23, 1992) was an American writer and novelist.

Several of his novels were made into films. Where the Boys Are, and The Shootist, which was John Wayne's last work, are probably the best known.

== Early life ==
Glendon Swarthout was the only child of Fred and Lila (Chubb) Swarthout, a banker and a homemaker. Swarthout is a Dutch name; his mother's maiden name was from Yorkshire. Swarthout generally did well in school, especially in English. He was a Michigan high-school debate champion.

He took accordion lessons and occupied his free time with books, for at 6 feet, 99 pounds, he was not good at sports.

Graduating in 1935, he relocated to Ann Arbor and the University of Michigan (UM). He became more seriously involved in music, forming and singing lead for a four-piece band that played for hops and for three consecutive summers at the Pantlind Hotel in Grand Rapids, the largest hotel in Michigan outside of Detroit.

Glendon majored in English at the UM, pledged Chi Phi, and dated Kathryn Vaughn, whom he had met when he was 13 and she 12, at her family's cottage on Duck Lake, outside of Albion, Michigan. They were married on December 28, 1940, after both had graduated from UM and Swarthout was writing advertising copy for Cadillac and Dow Chemical at the MacManus, John and Adams advertising agency in Detroit.

== Beginning writer ==
After a year in the advertising business, Swarthout decided the way to become a writer was to see the world as a journalist. He signed as a stringer for 22 small newspapers and travelled with his bride on a small freighter to South America, sending home a weekly column of their adventures. While in Barbados, they heard Pearl Harbor had been bombed and tried immediately to get to the States, but they needed five roundabout months avoiding German U-boats to cruise the East Coast to Manhattan.

== Wartime ==
Swarthout was ineligible for Officer Candidate School because he was underweight at 117 pounds. The couple both went to work at Willow Run, the new bomber plant outside of Ann Arbor. Working long days as a riveter on B-24s, he wrote his first novel at night in six months. Willow Run, a story about people working in a bomber factory, was published after a rewrite to mediocre reviews. He always saw this book as his training novel.

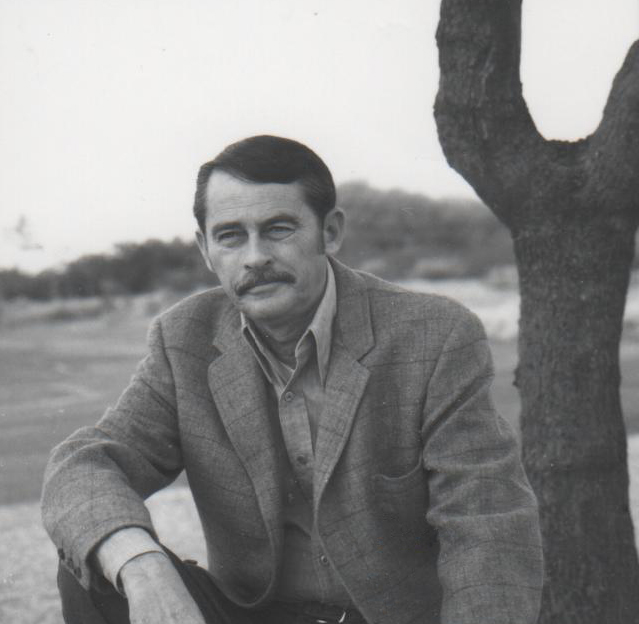
Glendon Swarthout at home in Scottsdale, Arizona

He was fit enough for an infantry company, however, as the war wore on, and he enlisted in the Army and was sent to Naples as a replacement for the 3rd Division. Awaiting the Anzio breakout on the beach in Italy, he was transferred to division headquarters. The 3rd Division moved out of Anzio and captured Rome, and Swarthout later landed in the second wave at St. Tropez and saw his only combat for six days, getting eyewitness statements for a few posthumous Medals of Honor as the unit moved rapidly north into France. When the 3rd Division was about to invade Germany, Swarthout ruptured a disc in his spine while unloading a truck. He was shipped home a sergeant and eventually discharged without surgery. Glendon suffered back pain for the rest of his life and received military disability. He eventually had back surgery in Arizona in his 50s on two imploded spinal discs.

== Postwar ==
Swarthout returned to UM, earned a master's degree, and began teaching college. During that time, his son Miles was born and he won a Hopwood Award for $800 for another novel, promoting him to the University of Maryland for a few years, where he ghost-wrote speeches for Congressmen and wrote more unpublished fiction. That autumn, he began teaching at Michigan State University and during eight years in East Lansing earned his PhD in Victorian literature in 1955, while his wife got her master's degree and a teaching certificate and commenced teaching children in the second grade.

Swarthout also began to sell short stories to national publications such as Cosmopolitan and The Saturday Evening Post. He was paid $2500 in 1955 for one of these stories, "A Horse for Mrs. Custer", which became a Randolph Scott low-budget Western for Columbia Pictures in 1956, under the title 7th Cavalry. The day after he finished his last doctoral examination, he started writing a novel called They Came To Cordura. Its setting was Mexico of 1916 during the Pershing Expedition to capture Pancho Villa, and some of its fictional cavalry troopers had been nominated for Medals of Honor. The book was quickly sold to Random House and then to Columbia Pictures in 1958, becoming one of their major motion pictures starring Gary Cooper and Rita Hayworth a year later. This NY Times bestseller and the movie money enabled Swarthout to become a professional writer at last. He was 39 years old.

He completed another novel while teaching Honors English at Michigan State. Where the Boys Are (1960) was set on the Michigan State campus and was the first comic novel about the annual "spring break" invasion of the beaches of southern Florida by America's college students. MGM's quick movie version, Where the Boys Are (1960), became the highest-grossing low-budget movie in the studio's history.

Swarthout went on to write many more novels, some of which were made into movies. He worked on the screenplay of only one, Cordura, at Columbia Pictures in Los Angeles for six months, before moving from Michigan to Arizona, where he continued to teach English at Arizona State University for four years before retiring to write full time. Many of his novels were set in either Michigan or Arizona, and some used his war experiences.

Several other works were sold for films that were never made; these include The Eagle and the Iron Cross (Sam Spiegel, 1968) and The Tin Lizzie Troop (Paul Newman, 1977), as well as a number of movie options, now lapsed, on his many stories. Besides a Hopwood Award and a Theatre Guild Award for his one play, Swarthout was twice nominated by his publishers for the Pulitzer Prize for Fiction (for They Came To Cordura by Random House and Bless The Beasts & Children by Doubleday), he received an O. Henry Prize Short Story nomination (in 1960 for "A Glass of Blessings"), a Gold Medal from the National Society of Arts and Letters in 1972, won Spur Awards for Best Western Novel of the Year from the Western Writers of America for The Shootist (1975) and The Homesman, a Wrangler Award for Best Western Novel of 1988 for The Homesman from the Western Heritage Association, and finally the Western Writers' Owen Wister Award for Lifetime Achievement at the National Cowboy & Western Heritage Museum (previously known as National Cowboy Hall of Fame) in Oklahoma City in June 1991. The Shootist was the basis of John Wayne's final film in 1976 and has since come to be recognized as a classic Western film and one of the Duke's very best. His British publisher (Secker & Warburg) claimed Swarthout had "the widest writing range" of any American novelist. From gunfighting Westerns The Shootist to the first of "the beach pictures," Where the Boys Are, from satires such as The Cadillac Cowboys, to tragedies such as Welcome to Thebes, or his adventure novel about the Pershing Expedition into Mexico, They Came to Cordura, or a mystery/thriller such as Skeletons, even a period romance such as Loveland, or an animal rights/environmental tale such as Bless the Beasts & Children, science fiction was about the only literary genre he did not attempt.

Glendon was inducted into the Western Writers Hall of Fame at its convention in Scottsdale, Arizona in 2008. The WWA's Hall of Fame is in the library of the famous Buffalo Bill Museum in Cody, Wyoming.

Swarthout, a lifelong smoker, died of emphysema in his home in Scottsdale, Arizona, on September 23, 1992.

== Significance ==
Swarthout, like most of his contemporaries, was affected by the Great Depression and World War II, which in turn influenced his 16 novels, particularly those set in the Midwest. Welcome to Thebes (1962), Loveland (1968), and Pinch Me, I Must Be Dreaming (1994) depict how the problems of adults affect their children, especially youth trying to adapt to an adult world. Although They Came to Cordura (1958) is set in Mexico at the time of the 1916 border dispute with Pancho Villa, its analysis of the nature of courage was influenced by Swarthout's wartime experiences. Teaching freshman honors English classes gave Swarthout insight into the mating rituals of college students on the beaches of Fort Lauderdale during spring break, and his hit Where the Boys Are (1960) definitely presaged the antiwar protests that occurred on American college campuses later in the decade. A Christmas Gift (1977, also known as The Melodeon) is an exception to Glendon's other work in several respects. It suggests a farewell tribute to his Michigan ancestors and his awareness of their tradition of understanding and concern for others.

With the conspicuous exception of A Christmas Gift, all of Swarthout's novels are infused with a sardonic spirit, usually in respect to examples of the cruelty and viciousness of which man is capable. His greatest bestseller, Bless the Beasts and Children, is a good example of this distinguishing literary trait. Another common theme of his writings is his study of courage, the extraordinary heroism of which otherwise common, ordinary men are sometimes capable, given the right circumstances. In setting free a doomed herd of buffalo, the group of mentally disturbed teenagers in Beasts demonstrates valor during harrowing conditions. The style of Swarthout's writing is fundamentally dispassionate, however, and written in a clear, linear, pictorial style, which is why so many of his stories were adapted easily to film. Swarthout was a great admirer of Somerset Maugham (with whom he studied, along with Ernest Hemingway and Joyce Cary as part of his doctoral thesis in literature) and humorist Charles Portis, who influenced his writing.

== Family ==
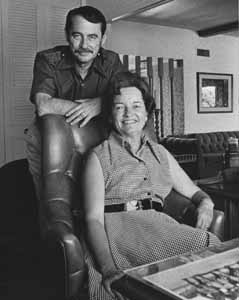
Glendon and Kathryn Swarthout at home in Scottsdale, Arizona

=== Kathryn Swarthout ===
Kathryn (1919–2015), the wife of Glendon and mother of Miles, was a former elementary school teacher for five years at Red Cedar School in East Lansing, Michigan, after earning her master's in education at Michigan State University, and Bachelor of Arts in English from the University of Michigan.

She co-wrote six young-adult novels with her husband; several of them have been published overseas. Kathryn was a columnist for Woman's Day magazine with her free-form poetry, Lifesavors, which ran in the magazine for over 20 years. Some of these columns were published in a book of the same title by Doubleday in 1982.

In 1962, Glendon and Kathryn established the Swarthout Writing Prizes at Arizona State University, administered by the English Department in Tempe. These six prizes in both poetry and fiction (with a current top prize of $1500 in each category), have grown until they now rank among the five highest awards financially for undergraduate and graduate writing programs given annually at any college or university in America.

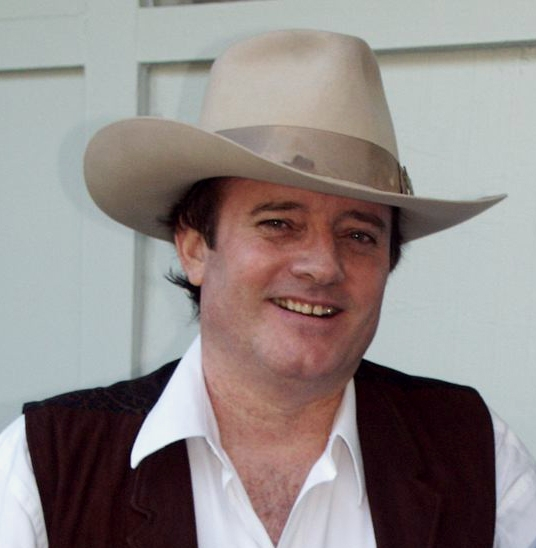
Miles Swarthout at a book signing

=== Miles Swarthout ===
Miles (1946–2016) was a screenwriter and author living in Playa Del Rey, California, near the beach and LAX. He received a Writers Guild nomination for Best Adaptation for The Shootist in 1976 (the film starred John Wayne and Lauren Bacall). He had adapted a number of his father's novels into films, among them A Christmas to Remember for CBS in 1978, which starred Joanne Woodward, Jason Robards, and Eva Marie Saint. As a journalist, Miles wrote a Hollywood Western film column for the Western Writers of America's bi-monthly magazine, The Roundup. He won a Stirrup Award from that organization for "The Duke's Last Ride, the Making of The Shootist," the best article to appear in that publication in 1994.

Miles Swarthout also wrote several articles for Persimmon Hill, the quarterly magazine of the National Cowboy Hall of Fame, among them "The Westerns of Glendon Swarthout" in the special summer issue from 1996, "Hollywood and the West", as well as in the sequel to this best-selling issue for spring 2000, "America's First Cinema Cowboy: William S. Hart".

Miles Swarthout was the plaintiff on an episode of the Judge Judy courtroom television series toward the end of the syndicated show's second season in 1998, whereby he was suing a woman hired as a line producer for a film Swarthout was directing. The woman, Miclaelina Lee, drew from the film's budget to pay for her rent, meals, and to pay various personal bills, and did not prove that Swarthout approved and signed off on those expenditures to Judge Judith Sheindlin's satisfaction. The judgement in the case was in favor of Miles Swarthout in the amount of $1,000.00.

Miles edited the only volume of his late father's 14 short stories, Easterns and Westerns, which included an extensive overview of Glendon's literary career. Michigan State University Press published Easterns and Westerns in hardcover in the summer of 2001. Miles Swarthout also wrote The Sergeant's Lady, based upon one of his late father's old short stories, and this new novel won the Spur Award from the Western Writers as the Best First Western Novel of 2004. The Last Shootist, his sequel to his father's novel, was named 2014's Best Western Novel by the editors of True West magazine.

== Novels ==
- Willow Run (1943)
- They Came to Cordura (1958)
- Where the Boys Are (1960)
- Welcome to Thebes (1962)
- The Cadillac Cowboys (1964)
- The Eagle and the Iron Cross (1966)
- Loveland (1968)
- Bless the Beasts and Children (1970)
- The Tin Lizzie Troop (1972)
- Luck and Pluck (1973)
- The Shootist (1975)
- A Christmas Gift (also known as The Melodeon) (1977)
- Skeletons (1979)
- The Old Colts (1985)
- The Homesman (1988)
- Pinch Me, I Must Be Dreaming (1994, posthumous)
- Easterns and Westerns (2001) (short story collection), edited by Miles Hood Swarthout

== Film adaptations ==
- 7th Cavalry – Columbia Pictures, 1956
- They Came to Cordura – Columbia Pictures, 1959
- Where the Boys Are – MGM, 1960
- Bless the Beasts & Children – Columbia Pictures, 1972
- The Shootist – Paramount, 1976
- A Christmas to Remember – CBS, 1978
- The Homesman, 2014.

== Awards ==
- O. Henry Prize short story (nomination), 1960
- National Society of Arts and Letters gold medal, 1972
- Spur Award, Best Western Novel of 1975, The Shootist, Western Writers of America
- Spur Award, Best Western Novel of 1988, The Homesman, Western Writers of America
- Wrangler Award, Best Western Novel of 1988, The Homesman, Western Heritage Association
- Owen Wister Award for Lifetime Achievement, Western Writers of America, 1991
- Induction into the Western Writers Hall of Fame in the library of the Buffalo Bill Museum in Cody, Wyoming, 2008
