= Bless the Beasts and Children (film) =

1971 film by Stanley Kramer

- Film poster
- Directed by: Stanley Kramer
- Screenplay by: Mac Benoff
- Based on: Bless the Beasts and Children by Glendon Swarthout
- Produced by: Stanley Kramer
- Starring: Bill Mumy; Barry Robins; Miles Chapin; Darel Glaser; Bob Kramer; Marc Vahanian
- Cinematography: Michel Hugo
- Edited by: William A. Lyon
- Music by: Barry De Vorzon; Perry Botkin Jr.
- Distributed by: Columbia Pictures
- Release dates: June 1971 (West Germany); August 1971 (U.S.)
- Running time: 109 minutes 102 minutes (TCM print)
- Country: United States
- Language: English

Bless the Beasts and Children is a 1971 film adaptation of the novel of the same name written by Glendon Swarthout. It was directed by Stanley Kramer and stars Bill Mumy and Barry Robins.

== Plot ==
Six teenaged boys, each a misfit in one way or another, are ostracized by the other boys at a summer camp but form a bond among themselves. After seeing a herd of bison selected for culling by local hunters, they resolve to sneak away from the camp in the middle of the night and set the penned bison free.

The film is presented partially out of sequence; the primary narrative of freeing the bison is interspersed with flashback scenes showing the boys' troubled lives.

== Cast ==
- Bill Mumy as Lawrence Teft III
- Barry Robins as John Cotton
- Miles Chapin as Sammy Shecker
- Darel Glaser as Gerald Goodenow
- Bob Kramer as Lally 1
- Marc Vahanian as Lally 2
- Jesse White as Shecker's Father
- Ken Swofford as Wheaties
- Elaine Devry as Cotton's Mother
- David Ketchum as Camp Director (credited as Dave Ketchum)
- Bruce Glover as Hustler
- Wayne Sutherlin as Hustler
- Vanessa Brown as Goodenow's Mother
- William Bramley as Goodenow's Stepfather

== Production and reception ==
A bidding war broke out over the film rights, which Stanley Kramer eventually won. Kramer negotiated with Columbia Pictures for the right to produce and direct the film, which made its world premiere at the Berlin Film Festival in August 1971, as the United States's entry in the international competition. Kramer later commented on Soviet reception of the film, stating that they "viewed [the film] as a preachment against Kent State and My Lai," when he had envisioned more of a statement about the "gun cult" in America and how "easy availability of weapons contributes to violence."

In his two-star review, film critic Roger Ebert expressed his frustration with the film's lack of cohesive message, debating whether the film was about the buffalo, the "neurotic kids" and the parents that raise them that way, or about gun control. Roger Greenspun of The New York Times argued that the film was not too particular subtle in equating the kids to the buffalo as a "trapped and endangered species" while labeling the film's thesis as "feeble". In his three-star review for his movie guide, Leonard Maltin listed it as "exciting and well-intentioned, if repetitious."

=== Awards and nominations ===
Award	Category	Nominee(s)	Result	Ref.
Academy Awards	Best Song – Original for the Picture	"Bless the Beasts and Children"; Music and Lyrics by Perry Botkin Jr. and Barry De Vorzon	Nominated	
Berlin International Film Festival	Golden Bear	Stanley Kramer	Nominated	
Berlin International Film Festival	OCIC Award	Stanley Kramer	Won	
Berlin International Film Festival	Interfilm Award	Stanley Kramer	Won	
Genesis Awards	Classic Film Award		Won	
Grammy Awards	Best Original Score Written for a Motion Picture or a Television Special	Perry Botkin Jr. and Barry De Vorzon	Nominated	

== Soundtrack and score ==
The music for the film was composed by Barry De Vorzon and Perry Botkin Jr. Their score included an instrumental selection titled "Cotton's Dream", which was later rescored to become the theme song of the soap opera The Young and the Restless, produced by Columbia's television division, now Sony Pictures Television. In late July or early August 1976, when ABC's sports summary program Wide World of Sports produced a montage of Romanian gymnast Nadia Comăneci's routines during the 1976 Summer Olympics and used "Cotton's Dream" as the background music, the song became more popular; it was subsequently released in a re-edited and lengthened form as "Nadia's Theme", the title under which it became best known. (Comăneci herself never performed her floor exercises using this piece of music, however.) De Vorzon and Botkin Jr. also wrote lyrics for "Cotton's Dream", but no vocal version of it was known to have charted as of August 2017. The film's soundtrack also contains its theme song, performed by The Carpenters. The theme was released as the B side of The Carpenters' single "Superstar", which reached #2 on Billboard's Hot 100 and #3 in Canada.

== See also ==
- List of American films of 1971
