= Bless the Beasts and Children (soundtrack) =

Soundtrack album by Barry De Vorzon and Perry Botkin Jr.
- Released: September 24, 1971
- Recorded: 1971
- Genre: Soundtrack
- Length: 23:08
- Label: A&M Records
- Producer: Barry De Vorzon and Perry Botkin Jr.

Singles from Bless the Beasts and Children
- 1. "Bless the Beasts and Children" Released: August 12, 1971; 2. "Nadia’s Theme (The Young and the Restless)" Released: August 28, 1976

The soundtrack to the 1971 film Bless the Beasts and Children consists of music by The Carpenters, Barry De Vorzon, Perry Botkin Jr. and Renee Armand. It included The Carpenters' "Bless the Beasts and Children" theme song as well as "Cotton's Dream", later known as "Nadia's Theme" from 1976 onwards. It has also been the theme song of the hit television soap opera The Young and the Restless 1973–present.

== Track listing ==
1. "Bless the Beasts and Children" – The Carpenters played this song, start to finish. They released it as a B-side song, and it peaked at #67 on the Billboard Hot 100.
2. "Cotton's Dream" (later known as ""Nadia's Theme (The Young and the Restless)") – It was extended and released as a single in 1976.
3. "Down the Line" – Barry De Vorzon – A vocal version performed by Barry De Vorzon. The reprise is transposed higher and is instrumental.
4. "Bless the Beasts and Children (Reprise #1)" – This is one of two instrumental versions on the LP.
5. "Lost" – Sung by Renée Armand; the melody is identical to "Cotton's Dream", but the arrangement is different and includes lyrics.
6. "Bless the Beasts and Children (Reprise #2)" – The second of two instrumental reprises of "Bless the Beasts and Children". The reprises were not performed by the Carpenters.
7. "Down the Line (Reprise)" – An instrumental version of "Down the Line", and is transposed from the key of D to the key of E.
8. "Journey's End" – "Down the Line" fades smoothly into "Journey's End", which includes strings playing "Bless the Beasts and Children" over and over again, but transposing lower every time.
9. "Stampede"
10. "Free"
11. "Requiem"

Note that there are three "Bless the Beasts and Children" tracks. All three are different, and have three different run times. The first one is the 3:07 vocal version, and #4 and #6 are both about 2:12. Track #4 has a version that is a hybrid between "Cotton's Dream" and "Bless the Beasts and Children". Track #6 is a very different version, with strings playing the melody. It has never been released on CD, and is currently only available on now-out of print vinyl records. A re-release of the 2:12 version (A&M 1890) reached #17 in Canada's RPM Magazine MOR chart, April 16, 1977.

== Singles ==
- Bless The Beasts And Children

JP 7" single (1972) AM-114

Bless the Beasts and Children
Help

- Superstar

US 7" single (1971) A&M 1289

Superstar
Bless the Beasts and Children

- Nadia's Theme

US 7" single (1976) A&M 1856

Nadia's Theme
Down the Line (Instrumental)
