= A Christmas to Remember (1978 film) =

- Genre: Drama
- Based on: The Melodeon by Glendon Swarthout
- Written by: Stewart Stern
- Directed by: George Englund
- Starring: Jason Robards; Eva Marie Saint; Joanne Woodward; George Parry
- Music by: Jimmie Haskell
- Country of origin: United States
- Original language: English

Production
- Production location: Rush City, Minnesota
- Cinematography: Gayne Rescher
- Editors: Jacqueline Cambas; Garry Griffin
- Running time: 100 minutes
- Production company: George Englund Productions

Original release
- Network: CBS
- Release: December 20, 1978

A Christmas to Remember is a 1978 American made-for-television drama film directed by George Englund and starring Jason Robards, Eva Marie Saint, and Joanne Woodward. Adapted from the 1977 novel The Melodeon by Glendon Swarthout, it first aired on the CBS network on December 20, 1978. It was filmed in Rush City, Minnesota.

== Plot ==
Rusty McCloud (George Parry) is sent by his economically-strapped mother (Joanne Woodward) to live on his grandparents' farm one winter during the Great Depression. The grandparents, Daniel Larson (Jason Robards) and his wife Emma (Saint), are still grieving the loss of their son in World War I, and Daniel in particular is initially gruff and resentful toward his grandson. However, a bond gradually develops between the two of them, and as Christmas approaches they work to deliver a melodeon left by the dead son to the local church as a surprise gift.

In a surprise twist, Daniel's son (who is also Rusty's uncle) returns from the dead to help deliver the melodeon.

== Cast ==
- Jason Robards as Daniel Larson
- Eva Marie Saint as Emma Larson
- Joanne Woodward as Mildred McCloud
- George Parry as Rusty McCloud
- Bryan Englund as Danny Larson
- Mary-Beth Manning as Louise Hockmeyer
- Nora Martin as Lollie Hockmeyer
- Sally Chamberlain as Lil Hockmeyer
- Arvid Carlson as Ralph Youngquist
- Mildred Carlson as Beulah Youngquist
- Allen Hamilton as Oskar Hockmeyer
- Todd Tanji as the cymbal player
- Dave Tanji and Bob Bach as snare drummers

== See also ==
- List of Christmas films
