= Donato Álvarez =

Former Army General of Argentina

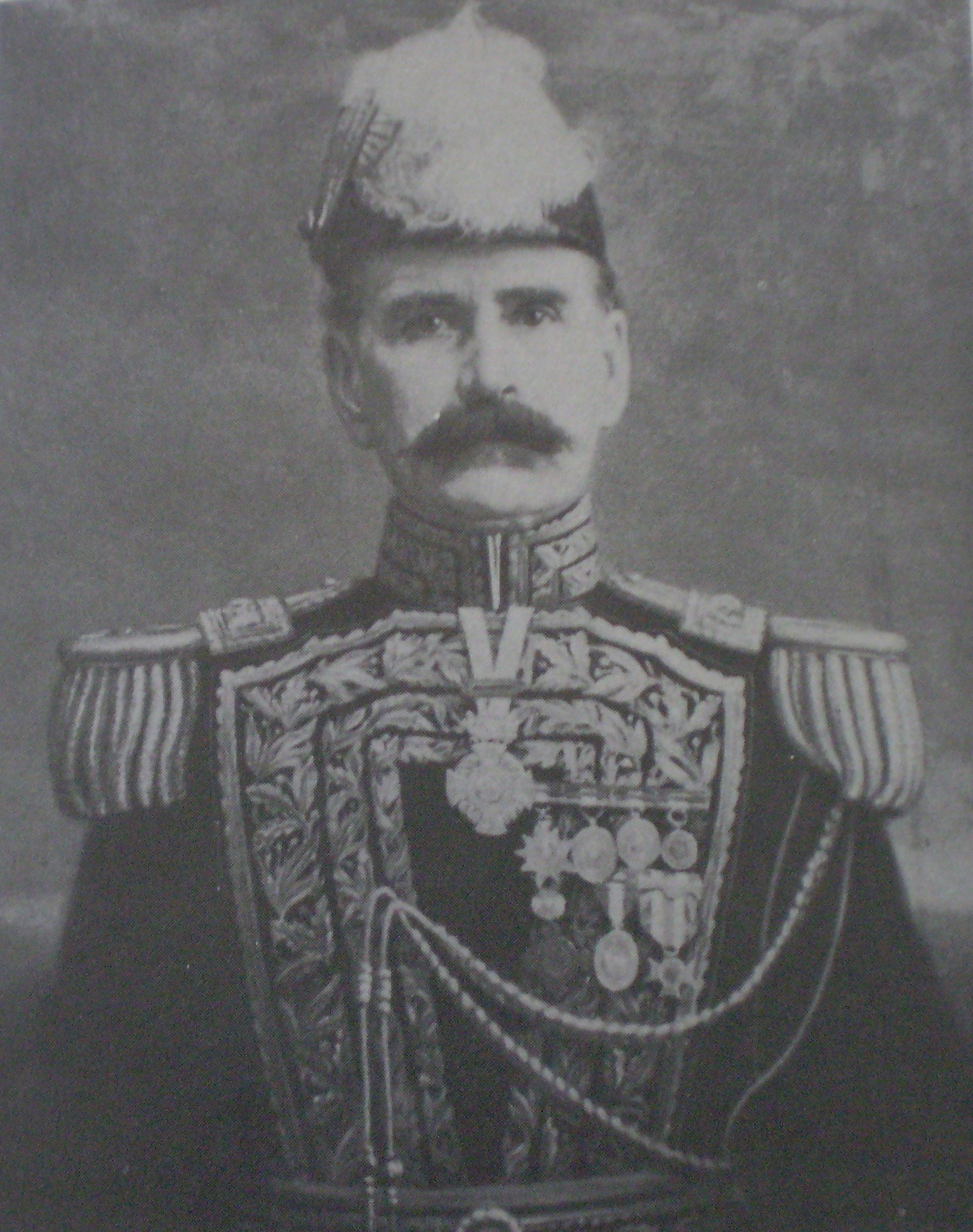
Donato Álvarez

Donato Álvarez (1825 – September 23, 1913) was an Argentine general. He fought in the battle of Vuelta de Obligado under the command of Lucio Mansilla. He joined Justo José de Urquiza in his conflict against Juan Manuel de Rosas, and fought in the battle of Caseros. He also fought in the Paraguayan War and the Conquest of the Desert. He died in Buenos Aires on September 23, 1913.
