= Surf Party =

1964 film by Maury Dexter

- Film poster
- Directed by: Maury Dexter
- Written by: Harry Spalding
- Produced by: Maury Dexter "By" Dunham
- Starring: Bobby Vinton; Patricia Morrow; Jackie DeShannon; Ken Miller; Richard Crane; Lory Patrick; Martha Stewart; Jerry Summers; The Astronauts; The Routers
- Cinematography: Kay Norton
- Edited by: Jodie Copelan
- Music by: Jimmie Haskell
- Production company: Associated Producers (API)
- Distributed by: Twentieth Century-Fox
- Release date: January 30, 1964
- Running time: 68 minutes
- Country: United States
- Language: English

Surf Party is a 1964 beach party film directed by Maury Dexter and starring Bobby Vinton, Patricia Morrow, Jackie DeShannon, and Ken Miller. It was the first direct imitation of AIP's hit Beach Party, which was released six months earlier, and showcased several musical acts onscreen. It is one of the few movies in the genre shot in black and white.

It has rarely been screened, and only received its first home video release in April 2013 as a DVD-R "on demand" through Fox.

== Plot ==
Arizonans Terry (Patricia Morrow), Sylvia (Lory Patrick), and Junior (Jackie DeShannon) drive to California's Malibu Beach to take a vacation, learn how to surf, and find Terry's brother "Skeet", Malibu's Big Kahuna bad boy (and a former football star whose career was ended with a skull injury).

While the girls are learning to surf, Terry falls in love with Len (Bobby Vinton), the operator of a local surf shop; Junior falls in love with Milo (Ken Miller), a new surfer; and Sylvia falls in love with Skeet (Jerry Summers).

Milo takes the girls to Casey's Surfer, the hangout on the pier where the surfers and their ilk gather. While the girls get into the club on the virtue that Terry is Skeet's sister, Milo is kept out because he is just a "gremmie."

In an effort to qualify for membership into Skeet's unruly surfing club (called "The Lodge"), Milo attempts to "shoot the pier" (surfing through the pier – called "run the pier" in the movie) and is injured when he smacks into one of the posts. As a result of Milo's smash-up, Len gets into an argument with Skeet, and just as they are about to fight, Terry warns Len that Skeet's football injury is still dangerous. Throughout all the proceedings, Sgt. Wayne Neal (Richard Crane), the decidedly "anti-surf" police sergeant, is on Skeet's back, waiting for him to screw up so he can either throw him in jail or out of town. Terry soon learns that her brother's reputation is greater than the reality.

Skeet is further humiliated when he throws a party and Pauline (Martha Stewart) – the wealthy older woman who apparently owns the beach house that Skeet has been living in – finds him in her bedroom with Sylvia. Pauline reveals that Skeet is indeed a "kept man". To the delight of Sgt. Neal, Skeet decides to return to Arizona with Sylvia when he realizes how much he loves her, and the girls enjoy the rest of the vacation with their boyfriends.

== Cast ==
- Bobby Vinton as Len Marshal
- Patricia Morrow as Terry Wells
- Jackie DeShannon as Junior Griffith
- Ken Miller as Milo Talbot (as Kenny Miller)
- Lory Patrick as Sylvia Dempster
- Richard Crane as Sgt. Wayne Neal
- Jerry Summers as Skeet Wells
- Martha Stewart as Pauline Lowell
- The Astronauts as Themselves
- The Routers as Themselves
- Lloyd Kino as Casey
- Mickey Dora as Surfer
- Johnny Fain as Surfer
- Pam Colbert as Surfer
- Donna Russell as Surfer

== Production ==
=== Cast ===
Popular singer Bobby Vinton, who plays Len, only appeared in three movies, this being his only one in the 1960s. It was Vinton's debut, although his agent had lobbied hard to get him the lead in Beach Party. He was paid $750 for a week of work.

Ken Miller, who plays the fresh-out-of-high-school "gremmie" Milo, was 33 years old at the time of filming. He had made two movies previously with Dexter.

Legendary surfer Mickey Dora doesn't have a speaking role, but is a featured extra in a sequence in the Casey's Surfer restaurant – playing the bowling-shirted surfer who follows Skeet's signal to lead the crowd in a clap-out.

=== Surf bands ===
The Astronauts was a Colorado-based surf band that had a Billboard Top 100 hit in 1963 with their song "Baja," composed by Lee Hazlewood. They also appeared in Dexter's later beach party movie Wild on the Beach as well as two other beach party movies, Wild Wild Winter and Out of Sight – more than any other surf band. Their recording of the title track "Surf Party" would go on to become a classic within the canon of first-wave surf music original songs, and would be covered by countless bands including The Surf Raiders, The Surf Coasters, Slacktone and many more.

The Routers was a band formed by Mike Gordon, whose first release in September 1962 was "Let's Go (Pony)", which reached #19 on the Billboard charts. Gordon also formed The Marketts and wrote their million seller "Out of Limits" and "Surfer's Stomp", which was one of the early successful surf songs released in 1961. The Routers toured for over six years, in part from the popularity of the movie and the songs associated with it.

=== Shooting ===
In addition to appearing as extras, surfers Mickey Dora and Johnny Fain, who appeared in several of AIP's beach party movies, performed the surfing stunts for this movie.

The pier featured throughout the movie is the historic 1905 Malibu Pier near Surfrider Beach. The exterior of Casey's Surfer on the pier is the westernmost of the two wood-sided white buildings with royal blue trim at the beachward end of the pier. Originally called Alice's, the restaurant and bar was operated as the Beachcomber Café from 2008 to 2012. "Len's Surf Shop" was situated in Malibu, west of the pier, near the intersection of Malibu Road and Webb Way, at 23651 Malibu Road.

Filming started September 1963 and was finished by October.

== Music ==
Jimmie Haskell composed the score and co-wrote five songs for the movie.

Jackie DeShannon performs two songs in the movie, "Glory Wave" and "Never Comin' Back", with Patricia Morrow and Lory Patrick (both written by Haskell and 'By' Dunham).

Bobby Vinton performs (twice) "If I Were an Artist", and Patricia Morrow sings "That's What Love Is" (both written by Bobby Beverly and Dunham).

The Astronauts perform two songs, the instrumental "Surf Party", heard over the opening and closing credits (written by Beverly and Dunham); and the onscreen performance of "Fire Water" (written by Haskell and Dunham).

The Routers perform "Crack Up" (written by Haskell and Dunham) onscreen.

Ken Miller performs "Pearly Shells" (written by Lani Kai, Jericho Brown and Dunham).

Dunham and Haskell also wrote "Great White Water", which is heard as source music on a jukebox in the sequence at Casey's Surfer restaurant.

Although the poster states "Hear ‘em Sing These Surfin Hits!" and listed nine tracks, only two tracks can be deemed as "surf music." In It's Party Time: A Musical Appreciation of the Beach Party Genre, Stephen J. McParland writes: "The commissioned song-writing team of Jimmie Haskell and By Dunham were hard-pressed to come up with enough convincing items to carry the soundtrack to the masses. What cognizance they possessed of ‘surf music’ was scant at best and only the Astronauts’ instrumentals...bore any real resemblance to the musical genre." For example, "Never Comin’ Back" is written as a folk song, "Pearly Shells" is in the style of a Hawaiian folk song, "That's What Love Is" is a country & western song, and "Glory Wave" is written and performed in the style of a Negro spiritual.

Regarding the two tracks by The Astronauts, the book Pop Surf Culture states "The Astronauts bang out a thick, reverb-laden instrumental called ‘Firewater,’ and their theme song ‘Surf Party’ happens to be one of the best surf instrumentals ever recorded."

== Critical response ==
Upon release, Eugene Archer of The New York Times wrote "Flaming youth may be passé, but you'd never know it from Surf Party...It's only the attitudes that seem archaic, as they bounce into passionless love affairs, take reckless surfboard risks in pointless tests of courage and display an alarming lack of inhibitions and not a trace of social responsibility."

Tom Lisanti writes "Surf Party is [a] realistic, albeit melodramatic, look at the surfing craze and Malibu surfers in particular. It is also an obvious rip-off of Beach Party without the zaniness. There is some neat surfing footage featuring pros like Mickey Dora and Johnny Fain but the flat black-and-white photography doesn’t do it justice though it buoys the story. The female leads all do well but Bobby Vinton and Kenny Miller fail miserably trying to pass themselves off as surfers."

Pop Surf Culture states "It was in the crummy-but-perfectly-named Surf Party that true beach crud reached its peak".

Lisanti later wrote that "with a bigger budget and more convincing male leads, Surf Party could have been considered one of the best Hollywood surf movies of the time, instead of just a middling cheap knock off of Beach Party."

Filmink argued "It has good moments but is weighed down by melodrama and focusing on the male characters when the women are more interesting."
