= The Routers =

Early 1960s American instrumental group

- Origin: Los Angeles, California, U.S.
- Genres: Pop, surf rock
- Years active: 1962–1970
- Label: Warner Bros. Records

The Routers were an American instrumental group in the early 1960s. Their biggest commercial success was in September 1962 with the instrumental single "Let's Go (Pony)", which reached No. 19 on the Billboard chart.

== Career ==
Formed in 1961 by Michael Z. Gordon, the Routers' recordings sometimes used session musicians in addition to the actual group, with the exception of Gordon, who also formed another successful group, the Marketts. Gordon composed the award-winning composition, "Out of Limits" with the Marketts. Gordon played on almost all of the Routers and Marketts sessions. The original line-up of the Routers was Al Kait, lead guitar; Lynn Frasier, tenor saxophone; Michael Zane Gordon, rhythm guitar, vocals; Scott Walker (then recording as Scott Engel), bass guitar; and Randy Viers, drums.

The Routers' first release in September 1962 was the guitar-driven instrumental "Let's Go (Pony)", which reached No. 19 on the Billboard chart. Its infectious "clap clap clap-clap-clap clap-clap-clap-clap Let's Go!" chant became a favorite of cheerleaders and crowds worldwide. The songwriting credits are given to local singer Lanny Duncan and his brother Robert Duncan. Lanny Duncan had previously recorded the original demo of the song in 1961 as a member of the Starlighters, featuring Tony Valentino on guitar and Jody Rich on bass. The demo was recorded in Glendale with engineer Eddie Brackett. Valentino and Rich went on to form the Standells in 1962.

The Routers' recording was instigated by record producer Joe Saraceno and his co-producer and composer Michael Z. Gordon, who also went on to compose "Apologize" by Ed Ames. Like many pop instrumentals recorded in Los Angeles, California, at this time, such as those by B. Bumble and the Stingers, "Let's Go (Pony)" involved Tommy Tedesco on guitar, Gordon (guitar), Plas Johnson (saxophone) and Earl Palmer (drums), and probably with Plas’ brother Ray Johnson on bass guitar.

Later Routers recordings were also written by Gordon, including the songs "A-ooga" and "Big Band". Their recordings continued to be issued up to 1964 but with less commercial success, and involved Gordon (guitar), Leon Russell (piano) and Hal Blaine (drums). The same group also recorded over the same period as the Marketts. Various studio and touring versions of the band also included Gordon, Randy Viers, and Scott Engel (later of the Walker Brothers).

The band appeared in the 1964 film Surf Party.

== Members ==
Original line-up

- Al Kait - lead guitar
- Lynn Frasier - tenor saxophone
- Michael Zane Gordon - rhythm guitar, vocals
- Scott Walker - bass guitar
- Randy Viers - drums.

Later sessionmen used

- Leon Russell - piano
- Hal Blaine - drums

== Discography ==
=== Studio albums ===
- Let's Go! With The Routers [Warner Bros. Records. WS 1490] February 1963.
- The Routers Play 1963's Great Instrumental Hits [Warner Bros. Records. WS 1524] November 1963.
- Charge! [Warner Bros. Records. WS 1559] August 1964.
- The Routers Play The Chuck Berry Song Book [Warner Bros. Records. WS 1595] April 1965.
- Superbird [Mercury. SRM 1-682] September 1973.

=== Singles ===
Year	Title	Peak chart positions		Record Label	B-side	Album
Year	Title	US Pop	UK	Record Label	B-side	Album
1962	"Let's Go (Pony)"	19	32	Warner Bros.	"Mashy"	Let’s Go! With the Routers
1963	"Make It Snappy"	—	—	Warner Bros.	"Half Time" (BB No. 115)	Let’s Go! With the Routers
1963	"Sting Ray"	50	—	Warner Bros.	"Snap Happy"	Let’s Go! With the Routers
1963	"A-Ooga"	—	—	Warner Bros.	"Big Band"	Non-album singles
1963	"Snap, Crackle and Pop"	—	—	Warner Bros.	"Amoeba"	Non-album singles
1964	"Crack Up"	—	—	Warner Bros.	"Let's Dance"	Non-album singles
1964	"Stamp and Shake"	—	—	Warner Bros.	"Ah-Ya"	Non-album singles
1966	"The Time Funnel"	—	—	RCA Victor	Walkin' Back	Non-album singles
1973	"Superbird"	—	—	Mercury	"Sack of Woe"	Superbird
