= Billboard Top Rock'n'Roll Hits: 1964 =

Compilation album by Various Artists
- Released: 1988 (original release); 1993 (re-release)
- Recorded: 1964
- Genres: Pop, rock
- Length: 24:38 (original 1988 release); 24:44 (1993 re-release)
- Label: Rhino Records

Billboard Top Rock'n'Roll Hits chronology
Billboard Top Rock'n'Roll Hits: 1963 (1988)	Billboard Top Rock'n'Roll Hits: 1964 (1988)	Billboard Top Rock'n'Roll Hits: 1965 (1989)

Billboard Top Rock'n'Roll Hits: 1964 is a compilation album released by Rhino Records in 1988, featuring ten hit recordings from 1964.

The album includes four songs that reached the top of the Billboard Hot 100 chart. The remaining six tracks each reached the Hot 100's Top 5. In 1993, the album was re-issued and replaced two chart toppers ("Do Wah Diddy Diddy" & "Rag Doll") with two other songs, "Chapel of Love" (another Hot 100 chart topper) and the Top 5 hit "Under the Boardwalk."

Absent from the track lineup were songs by The Beatles, which had the year's No. 1 song of the year, "I Want to Hold Your Hand". A disclaimer on the back of the album stated that licensing restrictions made the Beatles' tracks unavailable for inclusion on the album. A similar licensing restriction would preclude songs by The Rolling Stones from being included on other volumes in the Rhino "Billboard Top Rock'n'Roll Hits" and "Billboard Top Hits" series.

== Track listing ==
1988 original release

No.	Title	Writer(s)	Artist	Length
1.	"Bread and Butter" (Billboard peak No. 2 in September)	Larry Parks/Jay Turnbow	The Newbeats	2:00
2.	"Do Wah Diddy Diddy" (Billboard peak No. 1 in October)	Jeff Barry/Ellie Greenwich	Manfred Mann	2:23
3.	"I Get Around" (Billboard peak No. 1 in July)	Brian Wilson/Mike Love	The Beach Boys	2:15
4.	"The Little Old Lady from Pasadena" (Billboard peak No. 3 in August)	Don Altfeld/Jan Berry/Roger Christian	Jan & Dean	2:25
5.	"Out of Limits" (Billboard peak No. 3 in February)	Michael Z. Gordon	The Marketts	2:09
6.	"Suspicion" (Billboard peak No. 3 in April)	Doc Pomus/Mort Shuman	Terry Stafford	2:32
7.	"Rag Doll" (Billboard peak No. 1 in July)	Bob Crewe/Bob Gaudio	The Four Seasons	3:04
8.	"She's Not There" (Billboard peak No. 2 in December)	Rod Argent	The Zombies	2:24
9.	"Last Kiss" (Billboard peak No. 2 in November)	Wayne Cochran/Joe Carpenter/Randall Hoyal/Bobby McGlon	J. Frank Wilson and the Cavaliers	2:27
10.	"Leader of the Pack" (Billboard peak No. 1 in November)	Shadow Morton/Jeff Barry/Ellie Greenwich	The Shangri-Las	2:53
Total length:				24:38

1993 re-release, replacement tracks

No.	Title	Writer(s)	Artist	Length
2.	"Under the Boardwalk" (Billboard peak No. 4 in August)	Arthur Resnick/Kenny Young	The Drifters	2:39
7.	"Chapel of Love" (Billboard peak No. 1 in June)	Ellie Greenwich/Jeff Barry/Phil Spector	The Dixie Cups	2:47
Total length:				24:44
