= Billboard Top Rock'n'Roll Hits: 1971 =

Compilation album by Various artists
- Released: September 12, 1989
- Recorded: 1971
- Genres: Pop, Rock
- Length: 32:03
- Label: Rhino Records

Billboard Top Rock'n'Roll Hits chronology
Billboard Top Rock'n'Roll Hits: 1970 (1989)	Billboard Top Rock'n'Roll Hits: 1971 (1989)	Billboard Top Rock'n'Roll Hits: 1972 (1989)

Professional ratings
Review scores
Source	Rating
Allmusic	link

Billboard Top Rock'n'Roll Hits: 1971 is a compilation album released by Rhino Records in 1989, featuring 10 hit recordings from 1971.

All tracks on the album reached the top 5 on the Billboard Hot 100, with seven of the songs going to No. 1 on the chart.

== Track listing ==
No.	Title	Writer(s)	Artist	Length
1.	"Joy to the World"	Hoyt Axton	Three Dog Night	3:17
2.	"Maggie May"	Rod Stewart/Martin Quittenton	Rod Stewart	5:15
3.	"One Bad Apple"	George Jackson	The Osmonds	2:46
4.	"Family Affair"	Sly Stone	Sly and the Family Stone	3:07
5.	"Knock Three Times"	Irwin Levine/L. Russell Brown	Tony Orlando and Dawn	3:01
6.	"Gypsys, Tramps & Thieves"	Bob Stone	Cher	2:39
7.	"Indian Reservation (The Lament of the Cherokee Reservation Indian)"	John D. Loudermilk	Raiders	2:55
8.	"Treat Her Like a Lady"	Eddie Cornelius	Cornelius Brothers & Sister Rose	2:52
9.	"Black Magic Woman"	Peter Green	Santana	3:20
10.	"Draggin' the Line"	Tommy James/Bob King	Tommy James	2:51
Total length:				32:03
