= Billboard Top Rock'n'Roll Hits: 1957 =

Compilation album by Various Artists
- Released: June 28, 1988
- Recorded: 1957
- Genres: Pop, Rock
- Length: 23:49
- Label: Rhino Records

Billboard Top Rock'n'Roll Hits chronology
Billboard Top Rock'n'Roll Hits: 1956 (1988)	Billboard Top Rock'n'Roll Hits: 1957 (1988)	Billboard Top Rock'n'Roll Hits: 1958 (1988)

Professional ratings
Review scores
Source	Rating
AllMusic	4.5/5 stars

Billboard Top Rock'n'Roll Hits: 1957 is a compilation album released by Rhino Records in 1988, featuring 20 hit recordings from 1957. The album was certified Gold by the RIAA on October 19, 1999.

== Track listing ==
- Track information and credits taken from the album's liner notes.

No.	Title	Writer(s)	Artist	Length
1.	"All Shook Up"	Otis Blackwell; Elvis Presley	Elvis Presley & The Jordanaires	2:00
2.	"Wake Up Little Susie"	Felice Bryant; Boudleaux Bryant	The Everly Brothers	2:03
3.	"Diana"	Joe Sherman; Paul Anka	Paul Anka	2:29
4.	"Party Doll"	Buddy Knox; Jimmy Bowen	Buddy Knox	2:14
5.	"That'll Be the Day"	Jerry Allison; Buddy Holly; Norman Petty	The Crickets	2:18
6.	"Jailhouse Rock"	Jerry Leiber; Mike Stoller	Elvis Presley	2:28
7.	"Little Darlin'"	Maurice Williams	The Diamonds	2:09
8.	"Peggy Sue"	Jerry Allison; Norman Petty	Buddy Holly	2:31
9.	"School Day"	Chuck Berry	Chuck Berry	2:44
10.	"Whole Lot of Shakin' Going On"	Dave "Curlee" Williams	Jerry Lee Lewis	2:53
Total length:				23:49
