= Billboard Top Hits: 1976 =

Compilation album by Various artists
- Released: April 23, 1991
- Recorded: 1976
- Genres: Pop; rock
- Length: 33:54
- Label: Rhino Records

Billboard Top Hits chronology
Billboard Top Hits: 1975 (1991)	Billboard Top Hits: 1976 (1991)	Billboard Top Hits: 1977 (1991)

Professional ratings
Review scores
Source	Rating
AllMusic	4.5/5 stars

Billboard Top Hits: 1976 is a compilation album released by Rhino Records in 1991, featuring ten hit recordings from 1976.

The track lineup includes six songs that reached the top of the Billboard Hot 100 chart. The remaining four songs each reached the top 5 on the Hot 100.

== Track listing ==
No.	Title	Writer(s)	Artist	Length
1.	"Don't Go Breaking My Heart"	Elton John; Bernie Taupin	Elton John & Kiki Dee	4:25
2.	"Dream Weaver"	Gary Wright	Gary Wright	3:27
3.	"Love Machine (Pt. 1)"	William Griffin; Warren Moore	The Miracles	3:02
4.	"Let Your Love Flow"	Larry E. Williams	The Bellamy Brothers	3:18
5.	"Play That Funky Music"	Rob Parissi	Wild Cherry	3:18
6.	"Saturday Night"	Bill Martin; Phil Coulter	Bay City Rollers	2:58
7.	"Fooled Around and Fell in Love"	Elvin Bishop	Elvin Bishop	2:59
8.	"I'd Really Love to See You Tonight"	Parker McGee	England Dan & John Ford Coley	2:40
9.	"All By Myself"	Eric Carmen; Sergei Rachmaninoff	Eric Carmen	4:57
10.	"Theme from S.W.A.T."	Barry De Vorzon	Rhythm Heritage	2:50
Total length:				33:54

- Track information and credits were taken from the CD liner notes.
