= Billboard Top Hits: 1978 =

Compilation album by Various artists
- Released: April 23, 1991
- Recorded: 1978
- Genres: Pop; Rock
- Length: 34:40
- Label: Rhino

Billboard Top Hits chronology
Billboard Top Hits: 1977 (1991)	Billboard Top Hits: 1978 (1991)	Billboard Top Hits: 1979 (1991)

Professional ratings
Review scores
Source	Rating
AllMusic	4.5/5 stars

Billboard Top Hits: 1978 is a compilation album released by Rhino Records in 1991, featuring ten hit recordings from 1978.

The track lineup includes four songs that reached the top of the Billboard Hot 100 chart. The remaining six songs each reached the top ten of the Hot 100.

== Track listing ==
No.	Title	Writer(s)	Artist	Length
1.	"We Are the Champions"	Freddie Mercury	Queen	3:03
2.	"Hot Child in the City"	Nick Gilder; James McCulloch	Nick Gilder	3:09
3.	"It's a Heartache"	Ronnie Scott; Steve Wolfe	Bonnie Tyler	3:33
4.	"Take a Chance on Me"	Benny Andersson; Björn Ulvaeus	ABBA	4:01
5.	"Baby Come Back"	Peter Beckett; J.C. Crowley	Player	3:37
6.	"Reminiscing"	Graeham Goble	Little River Band	3:31
7.	"Lay Down Sally"	Eric Clapton; Marcy Levy; George Terry	Eric Clapton	3:34
8.	"If I Can't Have You"	Barry Gibb; Robin Gibb; Maurice Gibb	Yvonne Elliman	3:00
9.	"Kiss You All Over"	Mike Chapman; Nicky Chinn	Exile	3:30
10.	"I Go Crazy"	Paul Davis	Paul Davis	3:42
Total length:				34:40

- Track information and credits were taken from the album's liner notes.
