= Billboard Top Hits: 1980 =

Compilation album by Various artists
- Released: September 15, 1992
- Recorded: 1980
- Genres: Pop; rock
- Length: 39:32
- Label: Rhino

Billboard Top Hits chronology
Billboard Top Hits: 1979 (1991)	Billboard Top Hits: 1980 (1992)	Billboard Top Hits: 1981 (1992)

Professional ratings
Review scores
Source	Rating
AllMusic	4.5/5 stars

Billboard Top Hits: 1980 is a compilation album released by Rhino Records in 1992, featuring 10 hit recordings from 1980.

The track lineup includes five songs that reached the top of the Billboard Hot 100 chart, including the No. 1 song of 1980, "Call Me" by Blondie. The remaining four songs each reached the top five of the Hot 100.

== Track listing ==
No.	Title	Writer(s)	Artist	Length
1.	"Call Me"	Debbie Harry; Giorgio Moroder	Blondie	3:35
2.	"Fame (single version)"	Michael Gore; Dean Pitchford	Irene Cara	3:51
3.	"Working My Way Back to You/Forgive Me, Girl (single version)"	Sandy Linzer; Denny Randell / Michael Zager	The Spinners	4:05
4.	"Funkytown (single version)"	Steven Greenberg	Lipps Inc.	4:07
5.	"Little Jeannie"	Elton John; Gary Osborne	Elton John	5:14
6.	"Upside Down (single version)"	Bernard Edwards; Nile Rodgers	Diana Ross	3:42
7.	"He's So Shy"	Tom Snow; Cynthia Weil	The Pointer Sisters	3:40
8.	"Please Don't Go"	Harry Wayne Casey; Richard Finch	KC & the Sunshine Band	3:51
9.	"Do That to Me One More Time (single version)"	Toni Tennille	Captain & Tennille	3:56
10.	"Take Your Time (Do It Right) Part 1"	Sigidi; Harold Clayton	The S.O.S. Band	3:31
Total length:				39:32

- Track information and credits were taken from the album's liner notes.
