= Billboard Top Rock'n'Roll Hits: 1962 =

Compilation album by various artists
- Released: 1988 (original release); 1993 (re-release)
- Recorded: 1962
- Genres: Pop, Rock
- Length: 23:38 (original 1988 release); 24:04 (1993 re-release)
- Label: Rhino Records

Billboard Top Rock'n'Roll Hits chronology
Billboard Top Rock'n'Roll Hits: 1961 (1988)	Billboard Top Rock'n'Roll Hits: 1962 (1988)	Billboard Top Rock'n'Roll Hits: 1963 (1988)

Professional ratings
Review scores
Source	Rating
AllMusic	4.5/5 stars

Billboard Top Rock'n'Roll Hits: 1962 is a compilation album released by Rhino Records in 1988, featuring 10 hit recordings from 1962.

The album includes eight songs that reached the top of the Billboard Hot 100 chart. The remaining two tracks both reached the Hot 100's Top 5, with "The Wanderer" coming in at No. 2 and "Palisades Park" peaking at No. 3. The 1993 re-issue replaced the track "Big Girls Don't Cry" by the 4 Seasons with "Green Onions", a No. 3 song by Booker T & the M.G.'s, thus bringing the number of chart toppers down to seven on this release. The album was certified Gold by the RIAA on July 16, 1996.

== Track listing ==
- Track information and credits taken from the album's liner notes.

1988 original release
No.	Title	Writer(s)	Artist	Length
1.	"Big Girls Don't Cry"	Bob Crewe; Bob Gaudio	The Four Seasons	2:29
2.	"Duke of Earl"	Earl Edwards; Bernice Williams; Gene Chandler	Gene Chandler	2:27
3.	"Soldier Boy"	Florence Greenberg; Luther Dixon	The Shirelles	2:44
4.	"Sheila"	Tommy Roe	Tommy Roe	2:03
5.	"Peppermint Twist – Part 1"	Joey Dee; Henry Glover	Joey Dee & the Starliters	2:02
6.	"The Loco-Motion"	Gerry Goffin; Carole King	Little Eva	2:29
7.	"The Wanderer"	Ernie Maresca	Dion	2:50
8.	"Breaking Up Is Hard to Do"	Neil Sedaka; Howard Greenfield	Neil Sedaka	2:18
9.	"Johnny Angel"	Lyn Duddy; Lee Pockriss	Shelley Fabares	2:24
10.	"Palisades Park"	Chuck Barris	Freddy Cannon	1:52
Total length:				23:38

1993 reissue, replacement tracks
No.	Title	Writer(s)	Artist	Length
1.	"Green Onions"	Booker T. Jones; Steve Cropper; Al Jackson Jr.; Lewis Steinberg	Booker T. & the M.G.'s	2:55
Total length:				24:04
