= Billboard Top Rock'n'Roll Hits: 1973 =

Compilation album by Various artists
- Released: September 12, 1989
- Recorded: 1973
- Genres: Pop, Rock
- Length: 38:13
- Label: Rhino Records

Billboard Top Rock'n'Roll Hits chronology
Billboard Top Rock'n'Roll Hits: 1972 (1989)	Billboard Top Rock'n'Roll Hits: 1973 (1989)	Billboard Top Rock'n'Roll Hits: 1974 (1989)

Professional ratings
Review scores
Source	Rating
Allmusic	link

Billboard Top Rock'n'Roll Hits: 1973 is a compilation album released by Rhino Records in 1989, featuring ten hit recordings from 1973.

All tracks on the album reached the top 3 on the Billboard Hot 100, with eight of the songs going to No. 1 on the chart.

== Track listing ==
No.	Title	Writer(s)	Artist	Length
1.	"Crocodile Rock"	Elton John; Bernie Taupin	Elton John	3:58
2.	"Bad, Bad Leroy Brown"	Terry Cashman; Tommy West	Jim Croce	3:01
3.	"Midnight Train to Georgia"	Jim Weatherly	Gladys Knight & the Pips	4:41
4.	"Brother Louie"	Errol Brown; Anthony Wilson	Stories	3:57
5.	"Frankenstein"	Edgar Winter	Edgar Winter Group	3:28
6.	"Will It Go Round in Circles"	Billy Preston; Bruce Fisher	Billy Preston	3:46
7.	"Goodbye Yellow Brick Road"	Elton John; Bernie Taupin	Elton John	3:15
8.	"Let's Get It On"	Marvin Gaye; Ed Townsend	Marvin Gaye	4:03
9.	"Ramblin' Man"	Dickey Betts	Allman Brothers	4:57
10.	"Love Train"	Kenneth Gamble; Leon Huff	The O'Jays	3:07
Total length:				38:13
