= Billboard Top Rock'n'Roll Hits: 1965 =

Compilation album by various artists
- Released: 1989 (original release); 1993 (re-release)
- Recorded: 1965
- Genres: Pop, rock
- Length: 29:02 (original 1989 release); 28:26 (1993 re-release)
- Label: Rhino Records

Billboard Top Rock'n'Roll Hits chronology
| Billboard Top Rock'n'Roll Hits: 1964 (1988) | Billboard Top Rock'n'Roll Hits: 1965 (1989) | Billboard Top Rock'n'Roll Hits: 1966 (1989) |

Billboard Top Rock'n'Roll Hits: 1965 is a compilation album released by Rhino Records in 1989, featuring 10 hit recordings from 1965.

The album includes seven songs that reached the top of the Billboard Hot 100 chart. The remaining three tracks each reached the Hot 100's Top 5; one of those tracks was the No. 1 song of the year: "Wooly Bully" by Sam the Sham & the Pharaohs. A 1993 re-issue omitted both tracks by The Byrds as well as "Hang on Sloopy." These songs were replaced by "I Got You Babe" by Sonny & Cher (a No. 1 hit on the Billboard Hot 100) and two Top 5 hits: "The Name Game" and "A Lover's Concerto." This resulted in what was a Mr. Holland's Opus-esque album, as two songs from the 1993 re-release, "A Lover's Concerto" and "1-2-3", have been featured in the 1996 film Mr. Holland's Opus.

Absent from the track lineup were songs by The Beatles and The Rolling Stones. A disclaimer on the back of the album stated that licensing restrictions made tracks from the two bands unavailable for inclusion on the album.

== Track listing ==
1989 original release

| No. | Title | Writer(s) | Artist | Length |
|---|---|---|---|---|
| 1. | "Hang on Sloopy" (Billboard peak No. 1 in October) | Wes Farrell, Bert Russell | The McCoys | 3:05 |
| 2. | "Mr. Tambourine Man" (Billboard peak No. 1 in June) | Bob Dylan | The Byrds | 2:32 |
| 3. | "This Diamond Ring" (Billboard peak No. 1 in February) | Al Kooper, Irwin Levine, Bob Brass | Gary Lewis & the Playboys | 2:15 |
| 4. | "Help Me, Rhonda" (Billboard peak No. 1 in May) | Brian Wilson, Mike Love | The Beach Boys | 2:48 |
| 5. | "You've Lost That Lovin' Feelin'" (Billboard peak No. 1 in February) | Phil Spector, Barry Mann, Cynthia Weil | The Righteous Brothers | 3:47 |
| 6. | "Wooly Bully" (Billboard peak No. 2 in June) | Domingo Samudio | Sam the Sham & the Pharaohs | 2:22 |
| 7. | "1-2-3" (Billboard peak No. 2 in November) | John Medora, David White, Leonard Borisoff, Holland-Dozier-Holland | Len Barry | 2:32 |
| 8. | "Treat Her Right" (Billboard peak No. 2 in October) | Roy Head, Kurtz | Roy Head and The Traits | 2:07 |
| 9. | "Turn! Turn! Turn!" (Billboard peak No. 1 in December) | Ecclesiastes/Pete Seeger | The Byrds | 3:58 |
| 10. | "Eve of Destruction" (Billboard peak No. 1 in September) | P. F. Sloan | Barry McGuire | 3:36 |
| Total length: | | | | 29:02 |

1993 re-release, replacement tracks

| No. | Title | Writer(s) | Artist | Length |
|---|---|---|---|---|
| 1. | "The Name Game" (Billboard peak No. 3 in January) | Shirley Ellis, Lincoln Chase | Shirley Ellis | 3:03 |
| 2. | "A Lover's Concerto" (Billboard peak No. 2 in October) | Sandy Linzer, Denny Randell | The Toys | 2:42 |
| 9. | "I Got You Babe" (Billboard peak No. 1 in August) | Sonny Bono | Sonny & Cher | 3:14 |
| Total length: | | | | 28:26 |
