= Billboard Top Hits: 1975 =

Compilation album by Various artists
- Released: April 23, 1991
- Recorded: 1975
- Genre: Pop; rock
- Length: 34:15
- Label: Rhino Records

Billboard Top Hits chronology
Billboard Top Rock'n'Roll Hits: 1974 (1989)	Billboard Top Hits: 1975 (1991)	Billboard Top Hits: 1976 (1991)

Professional ratings
Review scores
Source	Rating
AllMusic	4.5/5 stars

Billboard Top Hits: 1975 is a compilation album released by Rhino Records in 1991, featuring 10 hit recordings from 1975.

The track lineup includes seven songs that reached the top of the Billboard Hot 100 chart, including the No. 1 song of 1975, "Love Will Keep Us Together" by Captain & Tennille. The other three songs all reached the top 10 of the Hot 100.

Starting with the 1975 volume, Rhino dubbed each of its mainstream pop top hits volumes Billboard Top Hits. The volumes issued for the years 1955 through 1974 are titled Billboard Top Rock'n'Roll Hits.

== Track listing ==
No.	Title	Writer(s)	Artist	Length
1.	"Sister Golden Hair"	Gerry Beckley	America	3:20
2.	"Island Girl"	Elton John; Bernie Taupin	Elton John	3:46
3.	"Love Will Keep Us Together"	Neil Sedaka; Howard Greenfield	Captain & Tennille	3:24
4.	"When Will I Be Loved"	Phil Everly	Linda Ronstadt	2:12
5.	"Fallin' in Love"	Dan Hamilton; Ann Hamilton	Hamilton, Joe Frank & Reynolds	3:03
6.	"Bad Blood"	Neil Sedaka; Phil Cody	Neil Sedaka	3:09
7.	"Philadelphia Freedom"	Elton John; Bernie Taupin	Elton John	5:41
8.	"Sky High"	Clive Scott; Des Dyer	Jigsaw	2:51
9.	"Jackie Blue"	Steve Cash; Larry Lee	The Ozark Mountain Daredevils	3:37
10.	"Get Down Tonight"	Harry Wayne Casey; Richard Finch	KC and the Sunshine Band	3:12
Total length:				34:15

- Track information and credits were taken from the album's liner notes.
