= Billboard Top Rock'n'Roll Hits: 1967 =

Compilation album by various artists
- Released: 1989 (original release); 1993 (re-release)
- Recorded: 1967
- Genre: Pop, rock
- Length: 26:33 (original 1989 release); 25:47 (1993 re-release)
- Label: Rhino Records

Billboard Top Rock'n'Roll Hits chronology
Billboard Top Rock'n'Roll Hits: 1966 (1989)	Billboard Top Rock'n'Roll Hits: 1967 (1989)	Billboard Top Rock'n'Roll Hits: 1968 (1989)

Professional ratings
Review scores
Source	Rating
AllMusic	4/5 stars

Billboard Top Rock'n'Roll Hits: 1967 is a compilation album released by Rhino Records in 1989, featuring 10 hit recordings from 1967.

The original album includes six songs that reached the top of the Billboard Hot 100 chart. The remaining four tracks each reached the Hot 100's Top 10. A re-issue in 1993 followed, replacing tracks by the Monkees, The Buckinghams, and Paul Revere & The Raiders with songs by Aretha Franklin, The Young Rascals, and Sam & Dave.

Absent from the track lineup were songs by The Beatles. A disclaimer on the back of the album stated that licensing restrictions made those tracks unavailable for inclusion on the album.

== Track listing ==
- Track information and credits taken from the album's liner notes.

1989 original release

No.	Title	Writer(s)	Artist	Length
1.	"Little Bit O' Soul"	John N. Carter; Ken Lewis	The Music Explosion	2:22
2.	"The Letter"	Wayne Carson	The Box Tops	1:55
3.	"Happy Together"	Garry Bonner; Alan Gordon	The Turtles	2:55
4.	"Daydream Believer"	John Stewart	The Monkees	3:08
5.	"Windy"	Ruthann Friedman	The Association	2:55
6.	"Kind of a Drag"	Jim Holvay	The Buckinghams	2:10
7.	"Incense and Peppermints"	John S. Carter; Tim Gilbert; Mark Weitz; Ed King	Strawberry Alarm Clock	2:49
8.	"I Think We're Alone Now"	Ritchie Cordell	Tommy James & the Shondells	2:11
9.	"Good Thing"	Paul Revere Dick; Terry Melcher; Mark Lindsay	Paul Revere & the Raiders	3:06
10.	"Gimme Some Lovin'"	Steve Winwood; Muff Winwood; Spencer Davis	The Spencer Davis Group	2:58
Total length:				26:29

1993 re-release, replacement tracks

No.	Title	Writer(s)	Artist	Length
4.	"Soul Man"	Isaac Hayes; David Porter	Sam & Dave	2:40
6.	"Respect"	Otis Redding	Aretha Franklin	2:26
9.	"Groovin'"	Felix Cavaliere; Eddie Brigati	The Young Rascals	2:32
Total length:				25:43
