= Billboard Top Hits: 1977 =

Compilation album by Various artists
- Released: April 23, 1991
- Recorded: 1977
- Genres: Pop; rock
- Length: 35:36
- Label: Rhino Records

Billboard Top Hits chronology
Billboard Top Hits: 1976 (1991)	Billboard Top Hits: 1977 (1991)	Billboard Top Hits: 1978 (1991)

Professional ratings
Review scores
Source	Rating
AllMusic	4.5/5 stars

Billboard Top Hits: 1977 is a compilation album released by Rhino Records in 1991, featuring ten hit recordings from 1977.

The track lineup includes seven songs that reached the top of the Billboard Hot 100 chart. The remaining three songs each reached the top five of the Hot 100.

== Track listing ==
No.	Title	Writer(s)	Artist	Length
1.	"Boogie Nights"	Rod Temperton	Heatwave	3:41
2.	"Undercover Angel"	Alan O'Day	Alan O'Day	3:33
3.	"Rich Girl"	Daryl Hall	Daryl Hall & John Oates	2:27
4.	"I'm in You"	Peter Frampton	Peter Frampton	4:12
5.	"Don't Leave Me This Way"	Kenneth Gamble; Leon Huff; Cary Gilbert	Thelma Houston	3:41
6.	"You Make Me Feel Like Dancing"	Leo Sayer; Vini Poncia	Leo Sayer	2:54
7.	"I'm Your Boogie Man"	Harry Wayne Casey; Richard Finch	KC and the Sunshine Band	4:04
8.	"Got to Give It Up (Pt. 1)"	Marvin Gaye	Marvin Gaye	4:12
9.	"Couldn't Get It Right"	Pete Haycock; Colin Cooper; Fred Jones; Derek Holt; John Cuffley	Climax Blues Band	3:20
10.	"Car Wash"	Norman Whitfield	Rose Royce	3:32
Total length:				35:36

- Track information and credits were taken from the CD liner notes.
