= Billboard Top Hits: 1989 =

Compilation album by various artists
- Released: April 19, 1994
- Recorded: 1989
- Genres: Pop; rock
- Length: 42:44
- Label: Rhino

Billboard Top Hits chronology
Billboard Top Hits: 1988 (1994)	Billboard Top Hits: 1989 (1994)	Billboard Top Hits: 1990 (2000)

Professional ratings
Review scores
Source	Rating
AllMusic	3/5 stars

Billboard Top Hits: 1989 is a compilation album released by Rhino Records in 1994, featuring ten hit recordings from 1989.

The track lineup includes seven songs that reached the top of the Billboard Hot 100 chart. The remaining three songs all reached the top five of the chart.

== Track listing ==
No.	Title	Writer(s)	Artist	Length
1.	"When I See You Smile"	Diane Warren	Bad English	4:21
2.	"Eternal Flame"	Susanna Hoffs; Tom Kelly; Billy Steinberg	Bangles	3:57
3.	"Sowing the Seeds of Love"	Roland Orzabal; Curt Smith	Tears For Fears	5:45
4.	"Toy Soldiers"	Marta Marrero; Michael Jay	Martika	4:40
5.	"Heaven" (single version)	Jani Lane	Warrant	4:07
6.	"Don't Wanna Lose You"	Gloria Estefan	Gloria Estefan	4:07
7.	"Soldier of Love"	Carl Sturken; Evan Rogers	Donny Osmond	3:52
8.	"Hangin' Tough"	Maurice Starr	New Kids on the Block	3:55
9.	"Right Here Waiting"	Richard Marx	Richard Marx	4:27
10.	"Lost in Your Eyes"	Debbie Gibson	Debbie Gibson	3:33
Total length:				42:44

- Track information and credits taken from the album's liner notes.
