= Billboard Top Hits: 1979 =

Compilation album by Various artists
- Released: April 23, 1991
- Recorded: 1979
- Genres: Pop; rock
- Length: 37:15
- Label: Rhino

Billboard Top Hits chronology
| Billboard Top Hits: 1978 (1991) | Billboard Top Hits: 1979 (1991) | Billboard Top Hits: 1980 (1992) |

Professional ratings
Review scores
| Source | Rating |
|---|---|
| AllMusic | 4.5/5 stars |

Billboard Top Hits: 1979 is a compilation album released by Rhino Records in 1991, featuring 10 hit recordings from 1979.

The track lineup includes six songs that reached the top of the Billboard Hot 100 chart, including the No. 1 song of 1979, "My Sharona" by The Knack. The remaining four songs each reached the top five on the Hot 100. The album was certified Gold by the RIAA on July 16, 1996.

== Track listing ==
| No. | Title | Writer(s) | Artist | Length |
|---|---|---|---|---|
| 1. | "Heart of Glass" | Debbie Harry; Chris Stein | Blondie | 3:27 |
| 2. | "My Sharona" | Doug Fieger; Berton Averre | The Knack | 4:04 |
| 3. | "Just When I Needed You Most" | Randy VanWarmer; Tony Wilson | Randy VanWarmer | 4:04 |
| 4. | "Escape (The Piña Colada Song)" | Rupert Holmes | Rupert Holmes | 4:13 |
| 5. | "I Will Survive" | Freddie Perren; Dino Fekaris | Gloria Gaynor | 3:20 |
| 6. | "Y.M.C.A." | Jacques Morali; Victor Willis; Henri Belolo | Village People | 3:46 |
| 7. | "Sad Eyes" | Robert John | Robert John | 3:34 |
| 8. | "Fire" | Bruce Springsteen | Pointer Sisters | 3:31 |
| 9. | "Ring My Bell" | Frederick Knight | Anita Ward | 3:38 |
| 10. | "The Devil Went Down to Georgia" | Charlie Daniels; Tom Crain; Joel DiGregorio; Fred Edwards; Charles Hayward; James W Marshall | Charlie Daniels Band | 3:38 |
| Total length: | | | | 37:15 |

- Track information and credits were taken from the CD liner notes.
