= Billboard Top Hits: 1981 =

Compilation album by Various artists
- Released: September 15, 1992
- Recorded: 1981
- Genres: Pop; rock
- Length: 36:47
- Label: Rhino

Billboard Top Hits chronology
Billboard Top Hits: 1980 (1992)	Billboard Top Hits: 1981 (1992)	Billboard Top Hits: 1982 (1992)

Professional ratings
Review scores
Source	Rating
AllMusic	4.5/5 stars

Billboard Top Hits: 1981 is a compilation album released by Rhino Records in 1992, featuring 10 hit recordings from 1981.

The track lineup includes eight songs that reached the top of the Billboard Hot 100 chart, including the No. 1 song of 1981, "Bette Davis Eyes" by Kim Carnes. Also included is the No. 1 song of 1982, "Physical" by Olivia Newton-John; the song began a 10-week run at No. 1 in November, after Billboard magazine's 1982 chart year had started.

The remaining two songs (Queen of Hearts and Being with You) reached No. 2 on the Hot 100.

== Track listing ==
No.	Title	Writer(s)	Artist	Length
1.	"Bette Davis Eyes"	Jackie DeShannon; Donna Weiss	Kim Carnes	3:49
2.	"Jessie's Girl"	Rick Springfield	Rick Springfield	3:16
3.	"The One That You Love"	Graham Russell	Air Supply	4:14
4.	"The Tide Is High"	John Holt	Blondie	3:53
5.	"Physical"	Steve Kipner; Terry Shaddick	Olivia Newton-John	3:45
6.	"9 to 5"	Dolly Parton	Dolly Parton	2:47
7.	"Queen of Hearts"	Hank DeVito	Juice Newton	3:29
8.	"Kiss on My List"	Daryl Hall; Janna Allen	Daryl Hall & John Oates	3:51
9.	"Being with You"	William "Smokey" Robinson	William "Smokey" Robinson	4:01
10.	"Celebration"	Robert Earl Bell; Ronald Nathan Bell; Claydes Charles Smith; George Melvin Brown; James Taylor; Eumir Deodato; Robert Spike Mickens; Earl Eugene Toon Jr.; Dennis Ronald Thomas	Kool & the Gang	3:42
Total length:				36:47

- Track information and credits were taken from the CD liner notes.
