= Billboard Top Hits: 1986 =

Compilation album by various artists
- Released: April 19, 1994
- Recorded: 1986
- Genres: Pop; rock
- Length: 39:45
- Label: Rhino

Billboard Top Hits chronology
Billboard Top Hits: 1985 (1994)	Billboard Top Hits: 1986 (1994)	Billboard Top Hits: 1987 (1994)

Professional ratings
Review scores
Source	Rating
AllMusic	2/5 stars

Billboard Top Hits: 1986 is a compilation album released by Rhino Records in 1994, featuring ten hit recordings from 1986.

The track lineup includes six songs that reached the top of the Billboard Hot 100 chart, included the No. 1 song of 1987, "Walk Like an Egyptian" by The Bangles, which began its four-week run at No. 1 in December 1986, after Billboard magazine's 1987 chart year had started.

The remaining four songs each reached the top five on the Hot 100.

== Track listing ==
No.	Title	Writer(s)	Artist	Length
1.	"Addicted to Love"	Robert Palmer	Robert Palmer	4:04
2.	"Danger Zone"	Giorgio Moroder; Tom Whitlock	Kenny Loggins	3:36
3.	"Take Me Home Tonight" (interpolates The Ronettes' 1963 hit Be My Baby)	Mike Leeson; Peter Vale; Ellie Greenwich; Jeff Barry; Phil Spector	Eddie Money	3:36
4.	"Stuck with You"	Chris Hayes; Huey Lewis	Huey Lewis & the News	4:28
5.	"Sara"	Peter Wolf; Ina Wolf	Starship	4:25
6.	"Venus"	Robbie van Leeuwen	Bananarama	3:51
7.	"When the Going Gets Tough, the Tough Get Going"	Wayne Anton Brathwaite; Barry James Eastmond; Robert John "Mutt" Lange; Billy Ocean	Billy Ocean	4:11
8.	"Burning Heart"	Jim Peterik; Frankie Sullivan	Survivor	3:53
9.	"Kyrie"	Richard Page; Steve George; John Lang	Mr. Mister	4:17
10.	"Walk Like an Egyptian"	Liam Sternberg	The Bangles	3:24
Total length:				39:45

- Track information and credits were taken from the album's liner notes.
