= Billboard Top Rock'n'Roll Hits: 1969 =

Compilation album by Various artists
- Released: 1989 (original release); 1993 (re-release)
- Recorded: 1969
- Genres: Pop, Rock
- Length: 35:52 (original 1989 release); 35:19 (1993 re-release)
- Label: Rhino Records

Billboard Top Rock'n'Roll Hits chronology
Billboard Top Rock'n'Roll Hits: 1968 (1989)	Billboard Top Rock'n'Roll Hits: 1969 (1989)	Billboard Top Rock'n'Roll Hits: 1970 (1989)

Professional ratings
Review scores
Source	Rating
Allmusic	4.5/5 stars

Billboard Top Rock'n'Roll Hits: 1969 is a compilation album released by Rhino Records in 1989, featuring 10 hit recordings from 1969.

The original album includes six songs that reached the top of the Billboard Hot 100 chart, including the year's No. 1 song, "Sugar, Sugar" by The Archies. The remaining four tracks each reached the Hot 100's Top 5. A 1993 re-issue replaced three tracks, bringing the number of chart toppers down from six to five. On the re-issue, a cover of the title track from the musical "Hair" was replaced with another cover from that musical: "Good Morning Starshine."

The album was certified Gold by the RIAA on July 16, 1996.

== Track listing ==
1989 original release

No.	Title	Writer(s)	Artist	Length
1.	"Aquarius/Let the Sunshine In"	Gerome Ragni/James Rado/Galt MacDermot	The 5th Dimension	4:52
2.	"Dizzy"	Tommy Roe/Freddy Weller	Tommy Roe	2:59
3.	"Sugar, Sugar"	Jeff Barry/Andy Kim	The Archies	2:47
4.	"Crimson and Clover"	Tommy James/Peter Lucia	Tommy James and the Shondells	3:26
5.	"I Can't Get Next to You"	Norman Whitfield/Barrett Strong	The Temptations	2:54
6.	"Na Na Hey Hey Kiss Him Goodbye"	Gary DeCarlo/Dale Frashuer/Paul Leka	Steam	4:06
7.	"Hair"	Gerome Ragni/James Rado/Galt MacDermot	The Cowsills	3:30
8.	"Build Me Up Buttercup"	Tony Macaulay/Mike d'Abo	The Foundations	3:00
9.	"Time of the Season"	Rod Argent	The Zombies	3:33
10.	"Get Together"	Chet Powers	The Youngbloods	4:39
Total length:				35:52

1993 re-release, replacement tracks

No.	Title	Writer(s)	Artist	Length
5.	"Crystal Blue Persuasion"	Tommy James/Mike Vale/Eddie Gray	Tommy James and the Shondells	4:04
7.	"Take a Letter, Maria"	R.B. Greaves	R.B. Greaves	2:45
10.	"Good Morning Starshine"	Gerome Ragni/James Rado/Galt MacDermot	Oliver	3:39
Total length:				35:19
