= Billboard Top Rock'n'Roll Hits: 1960 =

Compilation album by Various artists
- Released: 1988 (original release); 1993 (re-issue)
- Recorded: 1960
- Genre: Pop, Rock
- Length: 24:18 (original 1988 release); 23:37 (1993 re-release)
- Label: Rhino Records

Billboard Top Rock'n'Roll Hits chronology
| Billboard Top Rock'n'Roll Hits: 1959 (1988) | Billboard Top Rock'n'Roll Hits: 1960 (1988) | Billboard Top Rock'n'Roll Hits: 1961 (1988) |

Professional ratings
Review scores
| Source | Rating |
|---|---|
| AllMusic | 4.5/5 stars |

Billboard Top Rock'n'Roll Hits: 1960 is a compilation album released by Rhino Records in 1988, featuring ten hit recordings from 1960.

One song included on this disc, The Twist by Chubby Checker, is not an original Cameo/Parkway recording but a late 60's re-recording. The reason was because Cameo/Parkway's collection of songs was not able to be licensed for release on CD at that time. Rhino, therefore could not include the original recording. It is a rare instance that Rhino would substitute an original recording for a newer recording.

Two versions of this volume in the "Billboard Top Hits" series were released. The original version was released in 1988 and included two appearances by Elvis Presley: "It's Now or Never" and "Stuck on You." In 1993, the album was re-released and replaced the two Elvis songs with Joe Jones' "You Talk Too Much" and Brenda Lee's "Sweet Nothin's."

The track lineup on the original 1988 release includes eight songs that reached the top of the Billboard Hot 100 chart. The two exceptions were "Handy Man" and "Walk, Don't Run". The substitution of the Elvis Presley tracks on the re-release brings that number down to six for the 1993 reissue.

== Track listing ==
- Track information and credits taken from the album's liner notes.

1988 original release
| No. | Title | Writer(s) | Artist | Length |
|---|---|---|---|---|
| 1. | "It's Now or Never" | Wally Gold; Aaron Schroeder; Eduardo di Capua | Elvis Presley & The Jordanaires | 3:17 |
| 2. | "Cathy's Clown" | Don Everly; Phil Everly | The Everly Brothers | 2:25 |
| 3. | "The Twist" | Hank Ballard | Chubby Checker | 2:36 |
| 4. | "Save the Last Dance for Me" | Doc Pomus; Mort Shuman | The Drifters | 2:30 |
| 5. | "Running Bear" | Jiles Perry Richardson Jr. | Johnny Preston | 2:39 |
| 6. | "Stuck on You" | John Leslie McFarland; Aaron Schroeder | Elvis Presley & The Jordanaires | 2:20 |
| 7. | "Handy Man" | Jimmy Jones; Otis Blackwell | Jimmy Jones | 2:02 |
| 8. | "Walk, Don't Run" | Johnny Smith | The Ventures | 2:05 |
| 9. | "Alley Oop" | Dallas Frazier | The Hollywood Argyles | 2:45 |
| 10. | "Stay" | Maurice Williams | Maurice Williams and the Zodiacs | 1:39 |
| Total length: | | | | 24:18 |

1993 reissue, replacement tracks
| No. | Title | Writer(s) | Artist | Length |
|---|---|---|---|---|
| 1. | "You Talk Too Much" | Reginald Hall; Joe Jones | Joe Jones | 2:31 |
| 6. | "Sweet Nothin's" | Ronnie Self | Brenda Lee | 2:25 |
| Total length: | | | | 23:37 |
