= Billboard Top Hits: 1988 =

Compilation album by various artists
- Released: April 19, 1994
- Recorded: 1988
- Genres: Pop; Rock
- Length: 41:52
- Label: Rhino

Billboard Top Hits chronology
Billboard Top Hits: 1987 (1994)	Billboard Top Hits: 1988 (1994)	Billboard Top Hits: 1989 (1994)

Professional ratings
Review scores
Source	Rating
AllMusic	2.5/5 stars

Billboard Top Hits: 1988 is a compilation album released by Rhino Records in 1994, featuring ten hit recordings from 1988.

The 1988 volume includes nine songs that reached No. 1 on the Billboard Hot 100, while the remaining song — "Shattered Dreams" by Johnny Hates Jazz — peaked at No. 2.

== Track listing ==
No.	Title	Writer(s)	Artist	Length
1.	"Wishing Well"	Terence Trent D'Arby; Sean Oliver	Terence Trent D'Arby	3:35
2.	"Shattered Dreams"	Clark Datchler	Johnny Hates Jazz	3:31
3.	"Seasons Change"	Lewis Martineé	Exposé	4:18
4.	"Get Outta My Dreams, Get into My Car"	Billy Ocean; Robert John "Mutt" Lange	Billy Ocean	4:46
5.	"Anything for You"	Gloria Estefan	Gloria Estefan & Miami Sound Machine	4:05
6.	"Hold on to the Nights"	Richard Marx	Richard Marx	4:37
7.	"Wild, Wild West"	John Holliday; Johnnie Christo; Milan Zekavica; Trevor Steel	The Escape Club	4:08
8.	"The Flame"	Bob Mitchell; Nick Graham	Cheap Trick	4:47
9.	"Baby, I Love Your Way/Freebird Medley"	Peter Frampton / Allen Collins; Ronnie Van Zant	Will To Power	4:11
10.	"Don't Worry Be Happy"	Bobby McFerrin	Bobby McFerrin	3:54
Total length:				41:52

- Track information and credits taken from the album's liner notes.
