= Billboard Top Rock'n'Roll Hits: 1958 =

Compilation album by Various artists
- Released: June 28, 1988
- Recorded: 1958
- Genres: Pop, Rock
- Length: 22:53
- Label: Rhino Records

Billboard Top Rock'n'Roll Hits chronology
Billboard Top Rock'n'Roll Hits: 1957 (1988)	Billboard Top Rock'n'Roll Hits: 1958 (1988)	Billboard Top Rock'n'Roll Hits: 1959 (1988)

Professional ratings
Review scores
Source	Rating
AllMusic	4.5/5 stars

Billboard Top Rock'n'Roll Hits: 1958 is a compilation album released by Rhino Records in 1988, featuring 10 hit recordings from 1958.

== Reception ==
"All of them are well-known and original recordings, both of which make the collection fairly worthwhile despite its short running time" - Heather Phares for Allmusic.

== Track listing ==
- Track information and credits taken from the album's liner notes.

No.	Title	Writer(s)	Artist	Length
1.	"At the Hop"	John Madara; Dave White; Arthur Singer	Danny and The Juniors	2:33
2.	"Tequila"	Daniel Flores	The Champs	2:13
3.	"To Know Him Is to Love Him"	Phil Spector	The Teddy Bears	2:26
4.	"It's Only Make Believe"	Conway Twitty; Jack Nance	Conway Twitty	2:15
5.	"Get a Job"	Earl Beal; Raymond Edwards; Richard Lewis; William Horton	The Silhouettes	2:46
6.	"Hard Headed Woman"	Claude Demetrius	Elvis Presley & The Jordanaires	1:56
7.	"Little Star"	Vito Picone; Arthur Venosa	The Elegants	2:42
8.	"Bird Dog"	Boudleaux Bryant	The Everly Brothers	2:18
9.	"Yakety Yak"	Jerry Leiber; Mike Stoller	The Coasters	1:53
10.	"Great Balls of Fire"	Otis Blackwell; Jack Hammer	Jerry Lee Lewis	1:51
Total length:				22:53
