= Billboard Top Hits: 1991 =

2000 compilation album by Various artists

Compilation album by Various artists
- Released: February 15, 2000
- Recorded: 1991
- Genres: Pop; rock
- Length: 39:33
- Label: Rhino

Billboard Top Hits chronology
Billboard Top Hits: 1990 (2000)	Billboard Top Hits: 1991 (2000)	Billboard Top Hits: 1992 (2000)

Professional ratings
Review scores
Source	Rating
AllMusic	3/5 stars

Billboard Top Hits: 1991 is a compilation album released by Rhino Records in 2000, featuring ten hit recordings from 1991.

The track lineup includes six songs that reached the top of the Billboard Hot 100 chart. The remaining songs all reached the top five of the chart.

== Track listing ==
No.	Title	Writer(s)	Artist	Length
1.	"Baby Baby"	Keith Thomas; Amy Grant	Amy Grant	3:58
2.	"Gonna Make You Sweat (Everybody Dance Now)"	Robert Clivillés; Fredrick B. Williams	C&C Music Factory	4:08
3.	"I Like the Way (The Kissing Game)"	Teddy Riley; Bernard Belle; Dave Way	Hi-Five	3:58
4.	"More Than Words"	Gary Cherone; Nuno Bettencourt	Extreme	4:11
5.	"Unbelievable"	Ralph Jezzard	EMF	3:31
6.	"3 A.M. Eternal"	Jimmy Cauty; Bill Drummond	The KLF	3:38
7.	"High Enough"	Tommy Shaw; Jack Blades; Ted Nugent	Damn Yankees	4:20
8.	"Right Here, Right Now"	Mike Edwards	Jesus Jones	3:06
9.	"Hold You Tight"	Jake Smith; Tuhin Roy; William Hammond	Tara Kemp	3:48
10.	"I Adore Mi Amor"	Hamza Lee; Color Me Badd	Color Me Badd	4:55
Total length:				39:33

- Track information and credits taken from the album's liner notes.
