= Billboard Top Rock'n'Roll Hits: 1956 =

Compilation album by Various Artists
- Released: June 28, 1988
- Recorded: 1956
- Genres: Pop, Rock
- Length: 24:34
- Label: Rhino Records

Billboard Top Rock'n'Roll Hits chronology
Billboard Top Rock'n'Roll Hits: 1955 (1988)	Billboard Top Rock'n'Roll Hits: 1956 (1988)	Billboard Top Rock'n'Roll Hits: 1957 (1988)

Professional ratings
Review scores
Source	Rating
Allmusic	4.5/5 stars

Billboard Top Rock'n'Roll Hits: 1956 is a compilation album released by Rhino Records in 1988, featuring 10 hit recordings from 1956.

The track lineup includes three songs that reached the top of the Billboard Top 100 chart — two of the tracks "Don't Be Cruel" and "Hound Dog" are treated as a single No. 1 track.

== Track listing ==
No.	Title	Writer(s)	Artist	Length
1.	"Don't Be Cruel"	Otis Blackwell	Elvis Presley & The Jordanaires	2:04
2.	"Be-Bop-A-Lula"	Donald Graves; Gene Vincent; Bill "Sheriff Tex" Davis	Gene Vincent & His Blue Caps	2:37
3.	"Blue Suede Shoes"	Carl Perkins	Carl Perkins	2:16
4.	"I'm In Love Again"	Antoine Domino; Dave Bartholomew	Fats Domino	1:59
5.	"See You Later Alligator"	Robert Guidry	Bill Haley & His Comets	2:47
6.	"Hound Dog"	Jerry Leiber; Mike Stoller	Elvis Presley	2:18
7.	"The Fool"	Lee Hazlewood; Naomi Ford	Sanford Clark	2:46
8.	"The Green Door"	Bob Davie; Marvin Moore	Jim Lowe	2:14
9.	"Why Do Fools Fall in Love"	Frankie Lymon; Herman Santiago; Jimmy Merchant	Frankie Lymon & the Teenagers	2:19
10.	"The Flying Saucer, Pts. 1 & 2"	Bill Buchanan; Dickie Goodman	Buchanan & Goodman	4:25
Total length:				24:34

== See also ==
- 1988 in music
- 1956 in music
