= Billboard Top Rock'n'Roll Hits: 1966 =

Compilation album by various artists
- Released: 1989 (original release); 1993 (re-release)
- Recorded: 1966
- Genres: Pop, rock
- Length: 29:54 (original 1989 release); 30:19 (1993 re-release)
- Label: Rhino Records

Billboard Top Rock'n'Roll Hits chronology
Billboard Top Rock'n'Roll Hits: 1965 (1989)	Billboard Top Rock'n'Roll Hits: 1966 (1989)	Billboard Top Rock'n'Roll Hits: 1967 (1989)

Billboard Top Rock'n'Roll Hits: 1966 is a compilation album released by Rhino Records in 1989, featuring 10 hit recordings from 1966.

All ten songs on the original 1989 release reached number one on the Billboard Hot 100 chart. However a 1993 re-issue replaced the two Motown songs ("You Can't Hurry Love" & "Reach Out I'll Be There") as well as Nancy Sinatra's "These Boots are Made for Walkin'" with "When a Man Loves a Woman," "Devil with a Blue Dress On/Good Golly Miss Molly," and "Good Lovin'," subsequently bringing the number of chart toppers down from ten to nine.

Absent from the track lineup were songs by The Beatles and The Rolling Stones. A disclaimer on the back of the album stated that licensing restrictions made tracks from the two bands unavailable for inclusion on the album.

The album was certified Gold by the RIAA on April 2, 1997.

== Track listing ==
1989 original release

No.	Title	Writer(s)	Artist	Length
1.	"I'm a Believer" (Billboard peak No. 1 in December)	Neil Diamond	The Monkees	2:46
2.	"Summer in the City" (Billboard peak No. 1 in August)	John Sebastian/Steve Boone/Mark Sebastian	The Lovin' Spoonful	2:40
3.	"Wild Thing" (Billboard peak No. 1 in July)	Chip Taylor	The Troggs	2:37
4.	"Hanky Panky" (Billboard peak No. 1 in July)	Jeff Barry/Ellie Greenwich	Tommy James and the Shondells	2:56
5.	"You Can't Hurry Love" (Billboard peak No. 1 in September)	Holland-Dozier-Holland	The Supremes	2:49
6.	"(You're My) Soul and Inspiration" (Billboard peak No. 1 in April)	Barry Mann/Cynthia Weil	The Righteous Brothers	3:10
7.	"Monday, Monday" (Billboard peak No. 1 in May)	John Phillips	The Mamas & the Papas	3:27
8.	"Good Vibrations" (Billboard peak No. 1 in December)	Brian Wilson/Mike Love	The Beach Boys	3:40
9.	"These Boots Are Made for Walkin'" (Billboard peak No. 1 in February)	Lee Hazlewood	Nancy Sinatra	2:45
10.	"Reach Out I'll Be There" (Billboard peak No. 1 in October)	Holland-Dozier-Holland	Four Tops	2:59
Total length:				29:54

1993 re-release, replacement tracks

No.	Title	Writer(s)	Artist	Length
5.	"When a Man Loves a Woman" (Billboard peak No. 1 in May)	Calvin Lewis/Andrew Wright	Percy Sledge	2:58
9.	"Devil with a Blue Dress On & Good Golly Miss Molly" (Billboard peak No. 4 in November)	Shorty Long/William "Mickey" Stevenson & John Marascalco/Robert Blackwell	Mitch Ryder & the Detroit Wheels	3:31
10.	"Good Lovin'" (Billboard peak No. 1 in April)	Rudy Clark/Arthur Resnick	The Young Rascals	2:31
Total length:				30:19
