= Billboard Top Rock'n'Roll Hits: 1968 =

Compilation album by Various artists
- Released: 1989 (original release); 1993 (re-release)
- Recorded: 1968
- Genre: Pop, Rock
- Length: 28:28 (original 1989 release); 27:49 (1993 re-release)
- Label: Rhino Records

Billboard Top Rock'n'Roll Hits chronology
Billboard Top Rock'n'Roll Hits: 1967 (1989)	Billboard Top Rock'n'Roll Hits: 1968 (1989)	Billboard Top Rock'n'Roll Hits: 1969 (1989)

Professional ratings
Review scores
Source	Rating
Allmusic	link

Billboard Top Rock'n'Roll Hits: 1968 is a compilation album released by Rhino Records in 1989, featuring 10 hit recordings from 1968.

The album includes five songs that reached the top of the Billboard Hot 100 chart. The remaining five tracks each reached the Hot 100's Top 5. When the album was re-release in 1993, a number of tracks were taken off the collection and replaced with other hits from 1968. "I Heard it Through the Grapevine," "Love Child," "Born to Be Wild," & "Grazing in the Grass" were replaced with "Tighten Up," (the #1 song of the year) "(Sittin' on) the Dock of the Bay," "People Got to Be Free," & "Chain of Fools."

== Track listing ==
1989 original release

No.	Title	Writer(s)	Artist	Length
1.	"I Heard It Through the Grapevine"	Norman Whitfield/Barrett Strong	Marvin Gaye	3:20
2.	"Judy in Disguise (with Glasses)"	John Fred/Andrew Bernard	John Fred & His Playboy Band	2:58
3.	"Yummy Yummy Yummy"	Joey Levine/Arthur Resnick	Ohio Express	2:22
4.	"Green Tambourine"	Paul Leka/Shelly Pinz	The Lemon Pipers	2:25
5.	"Grazing in the Grass"	Philemon Hou	Hugh Masekela	2:40
6.	"Born to Be Wild"	Mars Bonfire	Steppenwolf	3:33
7.	"Cry Like a Baby"	Dan Penn/Spooner Oldham	The Box Tops	2:35
8.	"Mony Mony"	Bobby Bloom/Ritchie Cordell/Bo Gentry/Tommy James	Tommy James & the Shondells	2:54
9.	"Love Child"	R. Dean Taylor/Frank Wilson/Pam Sawyer/Deke Richards	Diana Ross & the Supremes	2:58
10.	"The Horse"	Jesse James	Cliff Nobles & Co.	2:43
Total length:				28:28

1993 re-release

No.	Title	Writer(s)	Artist	Length
1.	"Tighten Up"	Archie Bell/Billy Buttier	Archie Bell & the Drells	3:14
2.	"Judy in Disguise (with Glasses)"	John Fred/Andrew Bernard	John Fred & His Playboy Band	2:58
3.	"(Sittin' on) The Dock of the Bay"	Otis Redding/Steve Cropper	Otis Redding	2:47
4.	"People Got to Be Free"	Felix Cavaliere/Eddie Brigati	The Rascals	3:01
5.	"Chain of Fools"	Don Covay	Aretha Franklin	2:48
6.	"Green Tambourine"	Paul Leka/Shelly Pinz	The Lemon Pipers	2:27
7.	"Cry Like a Baby"	Dan Penn/Spooner Oldham	The Box Tops	2:35
8.	"Mony Mony"	Bobby Bloom/Ritchie Cordell/Bo Gentry/Tommy James	Tommy James & the Shondells	2:54
9.	"Yummy Yummy Yummy"	Joey Levine/Arthur Resnick	Ohio Express	2:22
10.	"The Horse"	Jesse James	Cliff Nobles & Co.	2:43
Total length:				27:49
