= Billboard Top Rock'n'Roll Hits: 1972 =

Compilation album by Various artists
- Released: September 12, 1989
- Recorded: 1972
- Genres: Pop, Rock
- Length: 41:21
- Label: Rhino Records

Billboard Top Rock'n'Roll Hits chronology
| Billboard Top Rock'n'Roll Hits: 1971 (1989) | Billboard Top Rock'n'Roll Hits: 1972 (1989) | Billboard Top Rock'n'Roll Hits: 1973 (1989) |

Professional ratings
Review scores
| Source | Rating |
|---|---|
| Allmusic | 3/5 stars |

Billboard Top Rock'n'Roll Hits: 1972 is a compilation album released by Rhino Records in 1989, featuring ten hit recordings from 1972.

All tracks on the album reached the top 3 on the Billboard Hot 100, with seven of the songs going to number one on the chart. The album was certified Gold by the RIAA on October 19, 1999.

== Track listing ==
| No. | Title | Writer(s) | Artist | Length |
|---|---|---|---|---|
| 1. | "Alone Again (Naturally)" | Gilbert O'Sullivan | Gilbert O'Sullivan | 3:40 |
| 2. | "I Can See Clearly Now" | Johnny Nash | Johnny Nash | 2:49 |
| 3. | "Black and White" | David Arkin; Earl Robinson | Three Dog Night | 3:50 |
| 4. | "Brandy (You're a Fine Girl)" | Elliot Lurie | Looking Glass | 3:07 |
| 5. | "My Ding-A-Ling" | Dave Bartholomew | Chuck Berry | 4:23 |
| 6. | "A Horse with No Name" | Dewey Bunnell | America | 4:13 |
| 7. | "Long Cool Woman (In a Black Dress)" | Allan Clarke; Roger Cook; Roger Greenaway | The Hollies | 3:19 |
| 8. | "Papa Was a Rollin' Stone" | Norman Whitfield; Barrett Strong | The Temptations | 7:01 |
| 9. | "Nights in White Satin" | Justin Hayward | The Moody Blues | 5:52 |
| 10. | "Back Stabbers" | Leon Huff; Gene McFadden; John Whitehead | The O'Jays | 3:07 |
| Total length: | | | | 41:21 |
