= Billboard Top Rock'n'Roll Hits: 1961 =

Compilation album by Various artists
- Released: 1988 (original release); 1993 (re-issue)
- Recorded: 1961
- Genres: Pop, rock
- Length: 25:39 (original 1988 release); 25:20 (1993 re-release)
- Label: Rhino Records

Billboard Top Rock'n'Roll Hits chronology
Billboard Top Rock'n'Roll Hits: 1960 (1988)	Billboard Top Rock'n'Roll Hits: 1961 (1988)	Billboard Top Rock'n'Roll Hits: 1962 (1988)

Professional ratings
Review scores
Source	Rating
AllMusic	4.5/5 stars

Billboard Top Rock'n'Roll Hits: 1961 is a compilation album released by Rhino Records in 1988, featuring 10 hit recordings from 1961.

Two versions of this volume in the "Billboard Top Hits" series were released — one in 1988, the other in 1993. The final four tracks on the original (those by Ernie K-Doe, The Marvelettes, The Tokens and Bobby Vee) are replaced on the re-issue with songs by James Darren, Chris Kenner, Ben E. King and Shep and the Limelites. The remaining six songs were kept in their original order.

All ten songs on the original 1988 release reached the top of the Billboard Hot 100 chart, which included the number one song of 1961, "Tossin' and Turnin'", while the 1993 re-issue only contained six chart toppers. However, the remaining four tracks reached the Hot 100's Top 10. "I Like It Like That, Part 1" and "Daddy's Home" both reached number two, "Stand by Me" was a number four song and "Goodbye Cruel World" topped out at number three. The album was certified Gold by the RIAA on February 16, 1995.

== Track listing ==
- Track information and credits taken from the album's liner notes.

1988 original release
No.	Title	Writer(s)	Artist	Length
1.	"Tossin' and Turnin'"	Ritchie Adams; Malou Rene	Bobby Lewis	2:37
2.	"Runaway"	Del Shannon; Max Crook	Del Shannon	2:22
3.	"Blue Moon"	Richard Rodgers; Lorenz Hart	The Marcels	2:15
4.	"Runaround Sue"	Dion DiMucci; Ernie Maresca	Dion	2:43
5.	"Quarter to Three"	Gene Barge; Frank Guida; Joseph F. Royster; Gary Anderson	Gary U.S. Bonds	2:30
6.	"Will You Love Me Tomorrow"	Gerry Goffin; Carole King	The Shirelles	2:43
7.	"Take Good Care of My Baby"	Gerry Goffin; Carole King	Bobby Vee	2:36
8.	"Please Mr. Postman"	Georgia Dobbins; William Garrett; Freddie Gorman; Brian Holland; Robert Bateman	The Marvelettes	2:31
9.	"Mother-in-Law"	Allen Toussaint	Ernie K-Doe	2:25
10.	"The Lion Sleeps Tonight"	Solomon Linda; Hugo Peretti; Luigi Creatore; George David Weiss; Albert Stanton	The Tokens	2:37
Total length:				25:19

1993 reissue, replacement tracks
No.	Title	Writer(s)	Artist	Length
7.	"I Like It Like That, Part 1"	Chris Kenner; Allen Toussaint	Chris Kenner	1:58
8.	"Daddy's Home"	James "Shep" Sheppard, Clarence Bassett, Charles Baskerville	Shep and the Limelites	2:53
9.	"Stand by Me"	Ben E. King; Jerry Leiber; Mike Stoller	Ben E. King	2:54
10.	"Goodbye Cruel World"	Gloria Shayne	James Darren	2:20
Total length:				25:15
