= Billboard Top Hits: 1987 =

Compilation album by various artists
- Released: April 19, 1994
- Recorded: 1987
- Genres: Pop; rock
- Length: 41:34
- Label: Rhino

Billboard Top Hits chronology
| Billboard Top Hits: 1986 (1994) | Billboard Top Hits: 1987 (1994) | Billboard Top Hits: 1988 (1994) |

Professional ratings
Review scores
| Source | Rating |
|---|---|
| AllMusic | 2.5/5 stars |

Billboard Top Hits: 1987 is a compilation album released by Rhino Records in 1994, featuring ten hit recordings from 1987.

The track lineup includes six songs that reached number one on the Billboard Hot 100 chart, with the remaining four songs ("C'est La Vie", "I Heard a Rumour", "Don't Dream It's Over" and "The Lady in Red") each reaching the top five on the chart.

== Track listing ==
| No. | Title | Writer(s) | Artist | Length |
|---|---|---|---|---|
| 1. | "With or Without You" | Paul David Hewson; David Howell Evans; Adam Clayton; Larry Mullen Jr. | U2 | 5:00 |
| 2. | "You Keep Me Hangin' On" | Brian Holland; Lamont Dozier; Eddie Holland | Kim Wilde | 4:18 |
| 3. | "C'est la Vie" | Robbie Nevil; Duncan Pain; Mark Holding | Robbie Nevil | 3:27 |
| 4. | "I Knew You Were Waiting (For Me)" | Simon Climie; Dennis Morgan | Aretha Franklin & George Michael | 4:02 |
| 5. | "At This Moment" | Billy Vera | Billy Vera & The Beaters | 4:15 |
| 6. | "I Heard a Rumour" | Matt Aitken; Sara Dallin; Siobhan Fahey; Mike Stock; Pete Waterman; Keren Woodward | Bananarama | 3:26 |
| 7. | "Heaven Is a Place on Earth" | Rick Nowels; Ellen Shipley | Belinda Carlisle | 4:14 |
| 8. | "Don't Dream It's Over" | Neil Finn | Crowded House | 4:00 |
| 9. | "Nothing's Gonna Stop Us Now" | Albert Hammond; Diane Warren | Starship | 4:35 |
| 10. | "The Lady in Red" | Chris DeBurgh | Chris DeBurgh | 4:17 |
| Total length: | | | | 41:34 |

- Track information and credits were taken from the album's liner notes.
