= Billboard Top Rock'n'Roll Hits: 1970 =

Compilation album by Various artists
- Released: September 12, 1989
- Recorded: 1970
- Genres: Pop, Rock
- Length: 32:17
- Label: Rhino Records

Billboard Top Rock'n'Roll Hits chronology
Billboard Top Rock'n'Roll Hits: 1969 (1989)	Billboard Top Rock'n'Roll Hits: 1970 (1989)	Billboard Top Rock'n'Roll Hits: 1971 (1989)

Professional ratings
Review scores
Source	Rating
Allmusic	link

Billboard Top Rock'n'Roll Hits: 1970 is a compilation album released by Rhino Records in 1989, featuring 10 hit recordings from 1970.

All tracks on the album reached the top 5 on the Billboard Hot 100, with six of the songs going to No. 1 on the chart.

== Track listing ==
No.	Title	Writer(s)	Artist	Length
1.	"Venus"	Robbie van Leeuwen	Shocking Blue	3:05
2.	"Mama Told Me (Not to Come)"	Randy Newman	Three Dog Night	3:21
3.	"I Think I Love You"	Tony Romeo	The Partridge Family	2:57
4.	"The Tears of a Clown"	Smokey Robinson/Stevie Wonder/Henry Cosby	Smokey Robinson and the Miracles	3:02
5.	"The Rapper"	Dominic Ierace	The Jaggerz	2:45
6.	"I Want You Back"	Freddie Perren/Alphonzo Mizell/Deke Richards/Berry Gordy	The Jackson 5	3:01
7.	"Spirit in the Sky"	Norman Greenbaum	Norman Greenbaum	4:03
8.	"Vehicle"	Jim Peterik	The Ides Of March	2:59
9.	"War"	Norman Whitfield/Barrett Strong	Edwin Starr	3:25
10.	"Green-Eyed Lady"	Jerry Corbetta/John Collingwood Phillips/Dave Riordan	Sugarloaf	3:39
Total length:				32:17
