= Billboard Top Rock'n'Roll Hits: 1974 =

Compilation album by Various Artists
- Released: September 12, 1989
- Recorded: 1974
- Genres: Pop, Rock
- Length: 34:42
- Label: Rhino Records

Billboard Top Hits chronology
Billboard Top Rock'n'Roll Hits: 1973 (1989)	Billboard Top Rock'n'Roll Hits: 1974 (1989)	Billboard Top Hits: 1975 (1991)

Professional ratings
Review scores
Source	Rating
Allmusic	4.5/5 stars

Billboard Top Rock'n'Roll Hits: 1974 is a compilation album released by Rhino Records in 1989, featuring 10 hit recordings from 1974.

The track lineup includes five songs that reached No. 1 on the Billboard Hot 100 chart, while the remainder were Top 10 hits.

== Track listing ==
No.	Title	Writer(s)	Artist	Length
1.	"Bennie and the Jets"	Elton John; Bernie Taupin	Elton John	5:23
2.	"The Loco-Motion"	Gerry Goffin; Carole King	Grand Funk Railroad	2:51
3.	"Nothing from Nothing"	Billy Preston; Bruce Fisher	Billy Preston	2:37
4.	"Come and Get Your Love"	Lolly Vegas	Redbone	3:34
5.	"I Can Help"	Billy Swan	Billy Swan	3:02
6.	"Dancing Machine"	Hal Davis; Don Fletcher; Dean Parks	The Jackson 5	2:38
7.	"The Joker"	Eddie Curtis; Ahmet Ertegun; Steve Miller	Steve Miller Band	3:39
8.	"Sweet Home Alabama"	Ed King; Gary Rossington; Ronnie Van Zant	Lynyrd Skynyrd	3:39
9.	"Boogie Down"	Leonard Caston, Jr.; Anita Poree; Frank Wilson	Eddie Kendricks	3:52
10.	"Rock On"	David Essex	David Essex	3:27
Total length:				34:42

== See also ==
- 1974 in music
