= Billboard Top Rock'n'Roll Hits: 1963 =

Compilation album by various artists
- Released: 1988 (original release); 1993 (re-release)
- Recorded: 1963
- Genres: Pop, Rock
- Length: 24:21 (original 1988 release); 23:59 (1993 re-release)
- Label: Rhino Records

Billboard Top Rock'n'Roll Hits chronology
Billboard Top Rock'n'Roll Hits: 1962 (1988)	Billboard Top Rock'n'Roll Hits: 1963 (1988)	Billboard Top Rock'n'Roll Hits: 1964 (1988)

Professional ratings
Review scores
Source	Rating
AllMusic	4.5/5 stars

Billboard Top Rock'n'Roll Hits: 1963 is a compilation album released by Rhino Records in 1988, featuring 10 hit recordings from 1963.

The album includes eight songs that reached the top of the Billboard Hot 100 chart, including the year's No. 1 song, "Sugar Shack" by Jimmy Gilmer and The Fireballs. The remaining three tracks each reached the Hot 100's Top 5 with "Fingertips - Pt. 2" and "Louie Louie" each peaking at No. 2 while "Surfin' U.S.A." topped out at No. 3.

Rhino re-issued the album with a revised track lineup in 1993. Two tracks on the original 1988 release—"Fingertips" by "Little" Stevie Wonder and "Walk Like a Man" by The 4 Seasons—were replaced on the re-issue with "If You Wanna Be Happy" by Jimmy Soul and "Deep Purple" by Nino Tempo & April Stevens. Both of the replacement songs reached No. 1 on the Hot 100 chart.

The album was certified Gold by the RIAA on October 30, 1997.

== Reception ==
"Another winner in this series" with "All original versions and excellent transfers" - Cub Koda, AllMusic Review

== Track listing ==
- Track information and credits taken from the album's liner notes.

1988 original release
No.	Title	Writer(s)	Artist	Length
1.	"Sugar Shack"	Keith McCormack; Fay Voss	Jimmy Gilmer & The Fireballs	2:03
2.	"Surf City"	Jan Berry; Brian Wilson	Jan & Dean	2:29
3.	"He's So Fine"	Ronnie Mack	The Chiffons	1:55
4.	"It's My Party"	Herb Weiner; Wally Gold; John Gluck, Jr.; Seymour Gottlieb	Lesley Gore	2:24
5.	"Fingertips - Pt. 2"	Clarence Paul; Henry Cosby	Stevie Wonder	3:13
6.	"Louie Louie"	Richard Berry	The Kingsmen	2:45
7.	"Easier Said Than Done"	William Linton; Larry Huff	The Essex	2:09
8.	"Walk Like a Man"	Bob Crewe; Bob Gaudio	The 4 Seasons	2:17
9.	"My Boyfriend's Back"	Bob Feldman; Jerry Goldstein; Richard Gottehrer	The Angels	2:37
10.	"Surfin' U.S.A."	Chuck Berry; Brian Wilson	The Beach Boys	2:29
Total length:				24:21

1993 reissue, replacement tracks
No.	Title	Writer(s)	Artist	Length
5.	"If You Wanna Be Happy"	Frank Guida; Carmella Guida; Joseph Royster	Jimmy Soul	2:23
8.	"Deep Purple"	Peter DeRose; Mitchell Parish	Nino Tempo & April Stevens	2:45
Total length:				23:59
