= Billboard Top Rock'n'Roll Hits: 1955 =

Compilation album by Various Artists
- Released: June 28, 1988
- Recorded: 1955
- Genres: Pop, Rock
- Length: 26:21
- Label: Rhino Records

Billboard Top Rock'n'Roll Hits chronology
Billboard Top Rock'n'Roll Hits: 1955 (1988)	Billboard Top Rock'n'Roll Hits: 1956 (1988)

Billboard Top Rock'n'Roll Hits: 1955 is a compilation album released by Rhino Records in 1988, featuring 10 hit recordings from 1955. The volume is the first in a series of albums by Rhino Records that chronicled years in music, starting from 1955 and continuing through 1995.

Each of the albums issued in the series included a "Time Capsule" in its liner notes. These notes served as a synopsis for the year featured on the album, including the top news headlines, sports events, television programs and trends in fashion and popular culture.

The track lineups tended to feature most of the year's top 10 hits, although some of the year's most popular songs on a given album were not included for various reasons — most commonly, licensing restrictions. This would be most evident for several of Rhino's Billboard volumes covering the 1960s, where songs by The Beatles and The Rolling Stones were not included. In such cases, other songs that were among the most popular of the year were substituted.

For the 1955 track lineup, just one song topped the Billboard Best Sellers in Stores chart: "Rock Around the Clock" by Bill Haley & His Comets. Also included was "Sincerely" by The Moonglows, whose version — which topped the Top Rhythm & Blues Songs chart — was used in place of The McGuire Sisters' version, which reached No. 1 on the Best Sellers in Stores mainstream chart. Most of the other songs reached the top 10 of one of the three charts Billboard had in place at the time — the Best Sellers in Stores, Most Played by Jockeys and Most Played in Jukeboxes.

Rhino's mainstream pop top hits volumes for the years 1955 through 1974 were titled "Billboard Top Rock'n'Roll Hits." Starting with the 1975 volume and continuing through the 1995 entry, the series became known as "Billboard Top Hits."

== Reception ==
Professional ratings
Review scores
Source	Rating
Allmusic	link

As with most of the albums in the series, Billboard Top Rock'n'Roll Hits: 1955 was well received. In their review for the album, Stephen Thomas Erlewine and Bruce Eder of Allmusic commented that the series "offers a view of the popular mainstream for each year ... ." Erlewine and Eder also lauded the inclusion of many of the most important artists of the 1950s on the early volumes; for instance, the initial 1955 volume included Bill Haley & His Comets, Chuck Berry, Fats Domino and The Platters. Subsequent volumes included tracks by early rock and roll artists Jerry Lee Lewis, the Everly Brothers, Buddy Holly, Paul Anka and Carl Perkins.

There were criticisms. For instance, Erlewine and Eder faulted the "poor liner notes, and brevity, as well as the omission of several important pop, rock, and album rock artists," although they admitted "the series isn't attempting to be comprehensive." The review concluded, "Still, this is a fun half-hour's listening, even with the weak moments that slipped through."

== Track listing ==
No.	Title	Writer(s)	Artist	Length
1.	"Rock Around the Clock"	Jimmy DeKnight; Max C. Freedman	Bill Haley & His Comets	2:13
2.	"Maybellene"	Alan Freed; Chuck Berry; Russ Fratto	Chuck Berry	2:23
3.	"Earth Angel (Will You Be Mine)"	Curtis Williams; Gaynel Hodge; Jesse Belvin	The Penguins	2:57
4.	"Ain't That a Shame"	Antoine Domino; Dave Bartholomew	Fats Domino	2:32
5.	"Hearts of Stone"	Eddie Ray; Rudy Jackson	The Fontane Sisters	2:16
6.	"Black Denim Trousers"	Jerry Leiber; Mike Stoller	The Cheers	2:10
7.	"Only You (And You Alone)"	Buck Ram	The Platters	2:38
8.	"Tweedle Dee"	Winfield Scott	LaVern Baker	3:20
9.	"At My Front Door"	Ewart G. Abner Jr.; John Moore	The El Dorados	2:40
10.	"Sincerely"	Alan Freed; Harvey Fuqua	The Moonglows	3:12
Total length:				26:21

== See also ==
- 1988 in music
