= Billboard Top Hits: 1983 =

Compilation album by various artists
- Released: September 15, 1992
- Recorded: 1983
- Genres: Pop; rock
- Length: 43:58
- Label: Rhino

Billboard Top Hits chronology
| Billboard Top Hits: 1982 (1992) | Billboard Top Hits: 1983 (1992) | Billboard Top Hits: 1984 (1992) |

Professional ratings
Review scores
| Source | Rating |
|---|---|
| AllMusic | 4.5/5 stars |

Billboard Top Hits: 1983 is a compilation album released by Rhino Records in 1992, featuring 10 hit recordings from 1983.

The track lineup includes four songs ("Down Under", "Africa", "Maniac" and "Total Eclipse of the Heart") that reached the top of the Billboard Hot 100 chart, with the remaining six songs each reaching the top five of the chart. The album was certified Gold by the RIAA on July 3, 1997.

== Track listing ==
| No. | Title | Writer(s) | Artist | Length |
|---|---|---|---|---|
| 1. | "Down Under" | Colin Hay; Ron Strykert | Men at Work | 3:45 |
| 2. | "Africa" | David Paich; Jeff Porcaro | Toto | 4:22 |
| 3. | "Stray Cat Strut" | Brian Setzer | Stray Cats | 3:17 |
| 4. | "Maniac" | Dennis Matkosky; Michael Sembello | Michael Sembello | 4:12 |
| 5. | "Electric Avenue" | Eddy Grant | Eddy Grant | 3:50 |
| 6. | "True" | Gary Kemp | Spandau Ballet | 5:43 |
| 7. | "Total Eclipse of the Heart" | Jim Steinman | Bonnie Tyler | 5:36 |
| 8. | "Jeopardy" | Greg Kihn; Steve Wright | The Greg Kihn Band | 3:49 |
| 9. | "Do You Really Want to Hurt Me" | Roy Hay; George O'Dowd; Mikey Craig; Jon Moss | Culture Club | 4:25 |
| 10. | "Making Love Out of Nothing at All" | Jim Steinman | Air Supply | 4:59 |
| Total length: | | | | 43:58 |

- Track information and credits were taken from the album's liner notes.
