= Billboard Top Hits: 1985 =

Compilation album by various artists
- Released: April 19, 1994
- Recorded: 1985
- Genres: Pop; rock
- Length: 41:07
- Label: Rhino

Billboard Top Hits chronology
Billboard Top Hits: 1984 (1992)	Billboard Top Hits: 1985 (1994)	Billboard Top Hits: 1986 (1994)

Professional ratings
Review scores
Source	Rating
AllMusic	4.5/5 stars

Billboard Top Hits: 1985 is a compilation album released by Rhino Records in 1994, featuring ten hit recordings from 1985.

The track lineup includes eight songs that reached the top of the Billboard Hot 100 chart and two songs each reaching no. 2.

== Track listing ==
No.	Title	Writer(s)	Artist	Length
1.	"Loverboy"	Keith Diamond; Billy Ocean; Robert John "Mutt" Lange	Billy Ocean	4:12
2.	"Shout"	Roland Orzabal; Ian Stanley	Tears for Fears	4:08
3.	"The Heat Is On"	Harold Faltermeyer; Keith Forsey	Glenn Frey	3:48
4.	"Broken Wings"	Richard Page; Steve George; John Lang	Mr. Mister	4:48
5.	"Miami Vice Theme"	Jan Hammer	Jan Hammer	2:29
6.	"Oh Sheila"	Melvin Riley Jr.; Gordon Strozier; Gerald Valentine	Ready for the World	3:41
7.	"We Built This City"	Bernie Taupin; Martin Page; Dennis Lambert; Peter Wolf	Starship	4:58
8.	"The Power of Love"	Huey Lewis; Chris Hayes; Johnny Colla	Huey Lewis and the News	3:56
9.	"Can't Fight This Feeling"	Kevin Cronin	REO Speedwagon	4:57
10.	"St. Elmo's Fire (Man in Motion)"	David Foster; John Parr	John Parr	4:10
Total length:				41:07

- Track information and credits were taken from the album's liner notes.
