= Billboard Top Rock'n'Roll Hits: 1959 =

Compilation album by Various artists
- Released: June 28, 1988
- Recorded: 1959
- Genre: Pop, Rock
- Length: 24:56
- Label: Rhino Records

Billboard Top Rock'n'Roll Hits chronology
Billboard Top Rock'n'Roll Hits: 1958 (1988)	Billboard Top Rock'n'Roll Hits: 1959 (1988)	Billboard Top Rock'n'Roll Hits: 1960 (1988)

Professional ratings
Review scores
Source	Rating
AllMusic	4.5/5 stars

Billboard Top Rock'n'Roll Hits: 1959 is a compilation album released by Rhino Records in 1988, featuring 10 hit recordings from 1959.

All the tracks reached the top 10 of the Billboard Hot 100 singles chart, eight of which went to #1. The exceptions, both peaking at number 2, were "Charlie Brown" and "16 Candles."

== Reception ==
"This budget ten-song selection has much to recommend it. Top-notch transfers make this one a great value." - Cub Koda for Allmusic.

== Track listing ==
- Track information and credits taken from the album's liner notes.

No.	Title	Writer(s)	Artist	Length
1.	"Mack the Knife"	Kurt Weill; Bertolt Brecht; Marc Blitzstein; Turk Murphy	Bobby Darin	3:11
2.	"Venus"	Ed Marshall; Peter DeAngelis	Frankie Avalon	2:23
3.	"Lonely Boy"	Paul Anka	Paul Anka	2:38
4.	"Stagger Lee"	Lloyd Price; Harold Logan	Lloyd Price	2:23
5.	"Kansas City"	Jerry Leiber; Mike Stoller	Wilbert Harrison	2:29
6.	"A Big Hunk O' Love"	Aaron Schroeder; Sidney Wyche	Elvis Presley & The Jordanaires	2:06
7.	"The Happy Organ"	Dave "Baby" Cortez; Kurt Wood	Dave "Baby" Cortez	2:03
8.	"Charlie Brown"	Jerry Leiber; Mike Stoller	The Coasters	2:26
9.	"16 Candles"	Luther Dixon; Allyson R. Khent	The Crests	2:55
10.	"Sleep Walk"	Santo Farina; Johnny Farina; Ann Farina	Santo & Johnny	2:22
Total length:				24:56
