= Billboard Top Hits: 1990 =

Compilation album by Various artists
- Released: February 15, 2000
- Recorded: 1990
- Genres: Pop; rock
- Length: 43:03
- Label: Rhino

Billboard Top Hits chronology
| Billboard Top Hits: 1989 (1994) | Billboard Top Hits: 1990 (2000) | Billboard Top Hits: 1991 (2000) |

Professional ratings
Review scores
| Source | Rating |
|---|---|
| AllMusic | 3/5 stars |

Billboard Top Hits: 1990 is a compilation album released by Rhino Records in 2000, featuring ten hit recordings from 1990.

The track lineup includes four songs that reached the top of the Billboard Hot 100 chart, including the No. 1 song of 1990, "Hold On" by Wilson Phillips. The remaining songs all reached the top five of the Hot 100.

== Track listing ==
| No. | Title | Writer(s) | Artist | Length |
|---|---|---|---|---|
| 1. | "Because I Love You (The Postman Song)" | Warren Allen Brooks | Stevie B | 4:22 |
| 2. | "The Power" | Michael Münzing; Luca Anzilotti | Snap! | 3:40 |
| 3. | "Cradle of Love" | Billy Idol; David Werner | Billy Idol | 4:41 |
| 4. | "Pray" | Stanley Burrell; Prince Nelson; Billy Gould; Roddy Bottum | MC Hammer | 5:13 |
| 5. | "Hold On" | Carnie Wilson; Chynna Phillips; Glen Ballard | Wilson Phillips | 3:42 |
| 6. | "Unskinny Bop" | Bruce Anthony Johannesson; Bret Michael Sychak; Robert Harry Kuykendall; Richard Allan Ream | Poison | 3:49 |
| 7. | "Step by Step" | Maurice Starr | New Kids on the Block | 4:29 |
| 8. | "Pump Up the Jam" | Manuela Kamosi; Thomas de Quincey | Technotronic | 3:38 |
| 9. | "I Wish It Would Rain Down" | Phil Collins | Phil Collins | 5:30 |
| 10. | "(Can't Live Without Your) Love and Affection" | Matthew Nelson; Gunnar Nelson; Marc Tanner | Nelson | 3:54 |
| Total length: | | | | 42:58 |

- Track information and credits taken from the album's liner notes.
