= Billboard Top Hits: 1984 =

Compilation album by Various artists
- Released: September 15, 1992
- Recorded: 1984
- Genres: Pop; rock
- Length: 40:45
- Label: Rhino

Billboard Top Hits chronology
Billboard Top Hits: 1983 (1992)	Billboard Top Hits: 1984 (1992)	Billboard Top Hits: 1985 (1994)

Professional ratings
Review scores
Source	Rating
AllMusic	4.5/5 stars
Robert Christgau	A

Billboard Top Hits: 1984 is a compilation album released by Rhino Records in 1992, featuring ten hit recordings from 1984.

The track lineup includes seven songs that reached the top of the Billboard Hot 100 chart, with the remaining three songs each reaching the top five of the chart.

== Critical reception ==
Heather Phares of AllMusic cited the album as "one of the decade's strongest collections of singles." Robert Christgau of The Village Voice gave the album an A rating and wrote: "After four Brits and Eddy Grant in two years, we get five black artists, five U.K. artists, and 'Talking in Your Sleep.' It didn't mean much—this was also the year of Reagan rampant, with 'Karma Chameleon' the only vaguely progressive moment. But give two cheers for formal evolution, the mass marketplace, the pleasures of false consciousness, and England swinging like a pendulum do."

== Track listing ==
No.	Title	Writer(s)	Artist	Length
1.	"Owner of a Lonely Heart"	Trevor Rabin; Jon Anderson; Chris Squire; Trevor Horn	Yes	3:52
2.	"Ghostbusters"	Ray Parker Jr.	Ray Parker Jr.	4:06
3.	"Talking in Your Sleep"	Coz Canler; Jimmy Marinos; Wally Palmar; Mike Skill; Peter Solley	The Romantics	3:58
4.	"Jump (For My Love)"	Stephen Mitchell; Marti Sharron; Gary Skardina	The Pointer Sisters	4:01
5.	"Caribbean Queen (No More Love on the Run)"	Billy Ocean; Keith Diamond	Billy Ocean	3:44
6.	"Wake Me Up Before You Go-Go"	George Michael	Wham!	3:54
7.	"Let's Hear It for the Boy"	Tom Snow; Dean Pitchford	Deniece Williams	4:20
8.	"Karma Chameleon"	George O'Dowd; Jon Moss; Mikey Craig; Roy Hay; Phil Pickett	Culture Club	4:14
9.	"Hold Me Now"	Tom Bailey; Alannah Currie; Joe Leeway	Thompson Twins	4:48
10.	"What's Love Got to Do With It"	Terry Britten; Graham Lyle	Tina Turner	3:48
Total length:				40:45

- Track information and credits were taken from the album's liner notes.
