= Billboard Top Hits: 1982 =

Compilation album by Various artists
- Released: September 15, 1992
- Recorded: 1982
- Genres: Pop; rock
- Length: 37:31
- Label: Rhino

Billboard Top Hits chronology
Billboard Top Hits: 1981 (1992)	Billboard Top Hits: 1982 (1992)	Billboard Top Hits: 1983 (1992)

Professional ratings
Review scores
Source	Rating
AllMusic	4.5/5 stars

Billboard Top Hits: 1982 is a compilation album released by Rhino Records in 1992, featuring ten hit recordings from 1982.

The track lineup includes four songs that reached the top of the Billboard Hot 100 chart and the remaining six songs each reaching the top three of the Hot 100.

== Track listing ==
No.	Title	Writer(s)	Artist	Length
1.	"Harden My Heart"	Marv Ross	Quarterflash	3:37
2.	"Rosanna"	David Paich	Toto	4:05
3.	"Eye in the Sky"	Alan Parsons; Eric Woolfson	The Alan Parsons Project	3:59
4.	"Gloria"	Umberto Tozzi; Giancarlo Bigazzi; Trevor Veitch	Laura Branigan	3:53
5.	"Who Can It Be Now?"	Colin Hay	Men At Work	3:24
6.	"Open Arms"	Steve Perry; Jonathan Cain	Journey	3:20
7.	"Don't Talk to Strangers"	Rick Springfield	Rick Springfield	3:01
8.	"Maneater"	Sara Allen; Daryl Hall; John Oates	Daryl Hall & John Oates	4:34
9.	"Up Where We Belong"	Jack Nitzsche; Buffy Sainte-Marie; Will Jennings	Joe Cocker & Jennifer Warnes	4:00
10.	"Centerfold"	Seth Justman	J. Geils Band	3:38
Total length:				37:31

- Track information and credits were taken from the album's liner notes.
