= Bob Stone =

Australian rules footballer (1925–2015)

Personal information
- Full name: Robert Lewis Stone
- Born: 26 May 1925; Somerville, Victoria
- Died: 24 June 2015 (aged 90); Inverloch, Victoria
- Original team: Hastings

Playing career^{1}
Years	Club	Games (Goals)
1942–43, 1949	Melbourne	8 (0)
- ^{1} Playing statistics correct to the end of 1949.

Robert Lewis Stone (26 May 1925 – 24 June 2015) was an Australian rules footballer who played with Melbourne in the Victorian Football League (VFL).

== Personal life ==
The son of Ronald William Stone (1897–1967), and Gertrude Amy Stone (1898–1951), née Berryman, Robert Lewis Stone was born at Somerville, Victoria, on 26 May 1925.

Stone married Jean Alison Bourne in 1949. He died from a stroke on 24 June 2015, at the age of 90.

== Australian rules football ==
Cleared to Melbourne from Somerville, Stone's football career was interrupted by his service in the Royal Australian Navy in the Second World War, enlisting as he turned 18 and serving on several ships until the end of the war.
