= Let's Go (Pony) =

Single by The Routers

from the album Let's Go! With The Routers
- B-side: "Mashy"
- Released: June 1962
- Recorded: April 13, 1962
- Genre: Pop, Rock
- Length: 2:18
- Label: Warner Bros.
- Songwriters: Lanny Duncan, Robert Duncan
- Producer: Joe Saraceno

The Routers singles chronology
"Let's Go (Pony)" (1962)	"Make It Snappy" (1963)

Let's Go (Pony) is a 1962 song by The Routers. Its infectious “[clap clap clap-clap-clap clap-clap-clap-clap] Let's Go!" chant became a favorite of cheerleaders and football fans worldwide. The musicians were key members of the famous session musicians known as the Wrecking Crew: Earl Palmer (drums), Plas Johnson (saxophone), Tommy Tedesco (guitar), Bill Pitman (guitar), and Jimmy Bond (bass).

== Background ==
Although the songwriting credits are given to local singer Lanny Duncan and his brother Robert Duncan, Lanny had previously recorded the original demo of the song in 1961 as a member of the Starlighters (The Standells), featuring Tony Valentino on guitar and Jody Rich on bass. The demo was recorded in Glendale, California with engineer Eddie Brackett.

== Reception and influence ==
Chartwise, the song charted on No. 19 on the Billboard Hot 100, No. 27 on Cashbox and No. 32 on the UK Singles Chart.

The recognizable hand-clapping rhythmic pattern became popular in cheerleading and as a football chant worldwide. The rhythm was later used in the Bay City Rollers hit "Saturday Night" in 1976, The Ramones' Phil Spector-produced "Do You Remember Rock 'n' Roll Radio?" in 1980 (which also quotes the phrase "let's go"), Like Wow – Wipeout (1985) by Australian band The Hoodoo Gurus, art-rock song "Mongoloid" by American band Devo, produced by Brian Eno in 1977, in 1982 Toni Basil's cheerleading anthem "Mickey" ("Oh Mickey, you're so fine...") and in John Fogerty's "Centerfield" in 1985. The Cars' 1979 hit "Let's Go" not only includes the same rhythm, but also the same title as its antecedent.

== Cover versions ==
- The song was also covered by The Ventures in 1963 as "Let's Go".
