= Out of Limits =

Single by The Marketts

from the album Out of Limits!
- B-side: "Bella Dalena"
- Released: October 1963
- Recorded: 1963
- Genre: Surf rock
- Length: 2:09
- Label: Warner Bros.
- Songwriter: Michael Z. Gordon

The Marketts singles chronology
"Surfer's Stomp" (1962)	"Out of Limits" (1963)	"Vanishing Point" (1964)

"Out of Limits" is a 1963 surf rock instrumental piece written by Michael Z. Gordon and performed by The Marketts.

== Background ==
While on tour with a band called the Routers, Gordon wrote the Marketts' first release on the Warner Bros. label and their biggest hit, an instrumental called "Outer Limits". First pressings were issued as "Outer Limits", named and surf-styled after the television program of the same name. However, Rod Serling sued the Marketts for quoting the four note motif from his television show, The Twilight Zone, without his approval, which resulted in the change of the title to "Out of Limits". The record has been described as "an intriguing up-beat disc with a galloping rhythm".

== Chart performance ==
The song peaked at No. 3 in February 1964 on the Hot 100 for two weeks and on Cashbox for one week. It stayed on both the Hot 100 and Cashbox for 14 weeks. It sold over a million copies globally, topped the charts on many U.S. radio stations, and earned Gordon a BMI award. It brought the studio group national prominence, and many radio, nightclub and personal appearances.

== Cover versions ==
The Ventures also had a very popular version of the song that was included on their 1964 album The Ventures In Space.

== Popular culture ==
"Out of Limits" is a popular choice for television and film soundtracks; it can be heard in:

- Pulp Fiction (1994)
- Slayground (1983)
- The Outsiders (1983)
- Mafioso: The Father, the Son (2004).
- It is also available on the compilations Billboard Top Rock'n'Roll Hits: 1964, Elvira Presents Haunted Hits and Classic Rock (Time-Life Music).
- As the theme tune for Frankie Boyle's New World Order (2017)
