= The Marketts =

American instrumental band

- Origin: United States
- Genres: Pop music, surf
- Years active: 1960s, 1970s, 1980s
- Labels: Arvee, Liberty, Mercury, Warner Bros., World Pacific
- Past members: Hal Blaine; George Dee; Michael Z. Gordon; Danny Hamilton; Judd Hamilton; Gene Pello; Ray Pohlman; Richard Torres

The Marketts were an American instrumental pop group, formed in January 1961 in Hollywood, California, by Michael Z. Gordon. They are best known for their 1964 million-seller, "Out of Limits".

== Biography ==
The Marketts' line-up featured Michael Z. Gordon and various session musicians from the Los Angeles area, including drummer Hal Blaine. The group name was originally spelled "Mar-Kets". The group's direction was spearheaded by producer Joe Saraceno and Michael Z. Gordon, although Saraceno could not arrange or play on any of the group's material. Gordon's songs which were composed for the Marketts are best remembered for their surf rock sound, though not all of their material has this sound; Gordon took the group's style in whatever direction he thought would catch the record-buying public's ear. In the U.S., the group had three Top 40 hits and had two popular albums, many of the songs composed by Gordon.

The Marketts' surfer sound started with "Surfer's Stomp", which was by written by and produced by Gordon and Saraceno. Gordon also wrote their biggest hit, "Out of Limits", which was originally titled "Outer Limits", named after the 1963 TV series The Outer Limits. Rod Serling sued the Marketts for quoting the four-note motif from his television show, The Twilight Zone, without his approval, which resulted in the change of the title to "Out of Limits". It reached No. 3 on the Billboard Hot 100 chart in 1964. It sold over one million copies, and was awarded a gold disc. The band name was used as late as 1977 for further releases, though their last hit came in 1966.

== Members ==
- Hal Blaine
- George Dee
- Michael Z. Gordon
- Danny Hamilton
- Judd Hamilton
- Gene Pello
- Ray Pohlman
- Rod Schaffer
- Richard Torres

== Discography ==
=== Albums ===
- Surfer's Stomp (Liberty, 1962)
- The Marketts Take To Wheels (Warner Bros., 1963)
- Out of Limits! (Warner Bros., 1963) U.S. No. 37
- The Surfing Scene (Liberty, 1963) (reissue of Surfer's Stomp)
- The Batman Theme (Warner Bros., 1966) U.S. No. 82 (Tracks: 1. "Batman Theme" 2. "Bat Cave" 3. "Robin the Boy Wonder" 4. "Bat Signal" 5. "Batmobile" 6. "The Joker" 7. "The Penguin" 8. "The Bat" 9. "Dr. Death" 10. "The Riddler" 11. "Bat Cape" 12. "The Cat Woman")
- Sun Power (World Pacific, 1967)
- AM-FM, Etc. (Mercury, 1973) (featured new versions of "Balboa Blue" and "Surfer's Stomp" and a cover of the Mystery Movie theme)
- Step On It (Calliope/Golden Voices, 1977) (credited as The New Marketts)
- Summer Means Love (Dore, 1982)

=== Singles ===
Year	Titles (A-side, B-side)	US Hot 100	Canada	Album
1961	"Surfer's Stomp" b/w "Start" (Non-album track)	31		Surfer's Stomp!
1962	"Beach Bum" b/w "Sweet Potatoes"			Non-album tracks
1962	"Balboa Blue" b/w "Stompede"	48	4	Surfer's Stomp!
1962	"Stompin' Room Only" b/w "Canadian Sunset" (from Sun Power)			Surfer's Stomp!
1963	"Woody Wagon" b/w "Cobra"			Take To Wheels
1963	"Outer Limits" (Original pressings) "Out of Limits" (Second pressings) b/w "Bella Dalena"	3	6	Out Of Limits
1964	"Vanishing Point" b/w "Borealis" (from Out Of Limits)	90		Non-album tracks
1964	"Look for a Star" b/w "Come See, Come Ska"			Non-album tracks
1965	"Miami's Blue" b/w "Napoleon's Solo"			Non-album tracks
1965	"Lady In The Cage" b/w "Ready, Steady, Go"			Non-album tracks
1966	"Batman Theme" b/w "Richie's Theme" (Non-album track)	17	5	Batman Theme
1966	"Theme From 'The Avengers'" b/w "A Touch Of Velvet-A Sting Of Brass"			Non-album tracks
1966	"Tarzan" b/w "Stirrin' Up Some Soul"			Non-album tracks
1967	"Sun Power" b/w "Sunshine Girl"			Sun Power
1968	"California Summer" b/w "Groovin' Time"			Non-album tracks
1969	"They Call The Wind Maria" b/w "The Undefeated"			Non-album tracks
1973	"Mystery Movie Theme" b/w "Sister Candy"			AM-FM, Etc.

== See also ==
- "We'll Sing in the Sunshine"
