= List of songs recorded by Buddy Holly =

Buddy Holly was an American musician and singer-songwriter whose career spanned from 1952 to 1959. This list includes songs that he recorded as a group leader or a solo artist that have been officially released in various formats. Year indicates when the recording was first released commercially.

List of songs with songwriter(s), original release, year, and other release(s) on albums
Song	Artist	Credited songwriter(s)	Original album release	Year	Other release(s) on albums
"Ain't Got No Home"	Buddy Holly (Note: Includes overdubs by The Fireballs)	Clarence "Frogman" Henry	Giant	1969	
"Baby, Won't You Come Out Tonight"	Buddy Holly	Buddy Holly, Don Guess	Reminiscing	1963	
"Because I Love You"	Buddy Holly	Buddy Holly	Reminiscing	1963	
"Blue Days, Black Nights" (a.k.a. "Blue Days")	Buddy Holly	Ben Hall	That'll Be the Day	1956	
"Blue Monday"	Buddy Holly	Dave Bartholomew	Giant	1969	
"Blue Suede Shoes"	Buddy Holly	Carl Perkins	Showcase	1964	
"Bo Diddley"	Buddy Holly	Ellas McDaniel	Reminiscing	1963	
"Brown Eyed Handsome Man"	Buddy Holly	Chuck Berry	Reminiscing	1963	
"Come Back Baby"	Buddy Holly	Norman Petty	Showcase	1964	
"Crying, Waiting, Hoping"	Buddy Holly	Buddy Holly	The Buddy Holly Story, Vol. II	1959	
"Don't Come Back Knockin'"	Buddy Holly	Buddy Holly, Sue Parrish	That'll Be the Day	1958	
"Door to My Heart"	Buddy Holly	Bob Montgomery	Holly in the Hills	1965	
"Down the Line"	Buddy Holly	Buddy Holly, Bob Montgomery, Norman Petty	Holly in the Hills	1965	
"Early in the Morning"	Buddy Holly	Bobby Darin, Woody Harris	The Buddy Holly Story	1959	
"An Empty Cup (And a Broken Date)"	The Crickets	Roy Orbison, Norman Petty	The "Chirping" Crickets	1957	
"Everyday"	Buddy Holly	Buddy Holly, Norman Petty	Buddy Holly	1958	The Buddy Holly Story
"Flower of My Heart"	Buddy Holly	Don Guess, Bob Montgomery	Holly in the Hills	1965	
"Fool's Paradise"	Buddy Holly	Sonny Le Claire, Horace Linsley, Norman Petty	Holly in the Hills	1965	
"Gambled My Heart"	Buddy Holly	Bob Montgomery	Holly in the Hills	1965	
"Girl on My Mind"	Buddy Holly & The Three Tunes	Don Guess	That'll Be the Day	1958	Showcase
"Gone"	Buddy Holly	Smokey Rogers	Showcase	1964	
"Good Rockin' Tonight"	Buddy Holly	Roy Brown	Giant	1969	
"Gotta Get You Near Me Blues"	Buddy Holly	Bob Montgomery	Holly in the Hills	1965	
"Have You Ever Been Lonely (Have You Ever Been Blue)"	Buddy Holly	Peter De Rose, George Brown	Giant	1969	
"Heartbeat"	Buddy Holly	Buddy Holly, Bob Montgomery	The Buddy Holly Story	1958	
"Holly Hop"	Buddy Holly	Ella Holley	Giant	1969	
"Honky Tonk"	Buddy Holly	Bill Doggett, Shep Shepherd, Clifford Scott, Billy Butler	Showcase	1964	
"I Guess I Was Just a Fool"	Buddy Holly	Buddy Holly	Showcase	1964	
"I Wanna Play House with You"	Buddy Holly	Arthur Gunter	Holly in the Hills	1965	
"I’m Changing All Those Changes"	Buddy Holly & The Three Tunes	Buddy Holly	That'll Be the Day	1958	Reminiscing (Note: Titled "Changing All Those Changes")
"I'm Gonna Love You Too"	Buddy Holly	Joe B. Mauldin, Niki Sullivan, Norman Petty	Buddy Holly	1958	
"I'm Gonna Set My Foot Down"	Buddy Holly	Buddy Holly	Reminiscing	1963	
"I'm Looking for Someone to Love"	The Crickets	Buddy Holly, Norman Petty	The "Chirping" Crickets	1957	
"It Doesn't Matter Anymore"	Buddy Holly	Paul Anka	The Buddy Holly Story	1959	
"It's Not My Fault"	Buddy Holly	Ben Hall, Weldon Myrick	Reminiscing	1963	
"It's So Easy!"	The Crickets	Buddy Holly, Norman Petty	The Buddy Holly Story	1958	
"It's Too Late"	The Crickets	Chuck Willis	The "Chirping" Crickets	1957	
"Last Night"	The Crickets	Joe B. Mauldin, Norman Petty	The "Chirping" Crickets	1957	
"Learning the Game"	Buddy Holly	Buddy Holly	The Buddy Holly Story, Vol. II	1960	
"Listen to Me"	Buddy Holly	Buddy Holly, Norman Petty	Buddy Holly	1958	
"Little Baby"	Buddy Holly	Buddy Holly, Norman Petty, C.W. Kendall Jr.	Buddy Holly	1958	The Buddy Holly Story, Vol. II
"Lonesome Tears"	Buddy Holly	Buddy Holly	Holly in the Hills	1965	
"Look at Me"	Buddy Holly	Buddy Holly, Jerry Allison, Norman Petty	Buddy Holly	1958	
"Love Is Strange"	Buddy Holly	Mickey Baker, Sylvia Vanderpool, Ethel Smith	Giant	1969	
"Love Me"	Buddy Holly	Buddy Holly, Sue Parrish	That'll Be the Day	1956	
"Love's Made a Fool of You"	Buddy Holly	Buddy Holly, Bob Montgomery	Showcase	1964	
"Mailman, Bring Me No More Blues"	Buddy Holly	Ruth Roberts, Bill Katz, Stanley Clayton	Buddy Holly	1958	
"Maybe Baby"	The Crickets	Buddy Holly, Norman Petty	The "Chirping" Crickets	1957	The Buddy Holly Story
"Midnight Shift"	Buddy Holly	Earl Lee, Jimmie Ainsworth	That'll Be the Day	1958	
"Modern Don Juan"	Buddy Holly	Don Guess, Jack Neal	That'll Be the Day	1956	
"Moondreams"	Buddy Holly	Norman Petty	The Buddy Holly Story, Vol. II	1960	
"Not Fade Away"	The Crickets	Buddy Holly, Norman Petty	The "Chirping" Crickets	1957	
"Now We're One"	Buddy Holly	Bobby Darin	The Buddy Holly Story, Vol. II	1960	
"Oh, Boy"	The Crickets	Sonny West, Bill Tilghman, Norman Petty	The "Chirping" Crickets	1957	The Buddy Holly Story
"Peggy Sue"	Buddy Holly	Buddy Holly, Jerry Allison, Norman Petty	Buddy Holly	1958	The Buddy Holly Story
"Peggy Sue Got Married"	Buddy Holly	Buddy Holly	The Buddy Holly Story, Vol. II	1959	
"Raining in My Heart"	Buddy Holly	Felice and Boudleaux Bryant	The Buddy Holly Story	1959	
"Rave On!"	Buddy Holly	Sonny West, Bill Tilghman, Norman Petty	Buddy Holly	1958	The Buddy Holly Story
"Ready Teddy"	Buddy Holly	Robert Blackwell, John Marascalco	Buddy Holly	1958	
"Reminiscing"	Buddy Holly	King Curtis	Reminiscing	1962	
"Rip It Up"	Buddy Holly	Robert Blackwell, John Marascalco	Showcase	1964	
"Rock-A-Bye Rock"	Buddy Holly	Buddy Holly	Reminiscing	1963	
"Rock Around with Ollie Vee"	Buddy Holly & The Three Tunes	Sonny Curtis	That'll Be the Day	1957	Showcase
"Rock Me My Baby"	The Crickets	Shorty Long, Susan Heather	The "Chirping" Crickets	1957	
"Send Me Some Lovin'"	The Crickets	John Marascalco, Leo Price	The "Chirping" Crickets	1957	
"Shake, Rattle and Roll"	Buddy Holly	Charles E. Calhoun	Showcase	1964	
"Slippin' and Slidin'"	Buddy Holly	Little Richard, Eddie Bo, Al Collins, James Smith	Reminiscing	1963	Giant
"Smokey Joe's Cafe"	Buddy Holly	Jerry Leiber, Mike Stoller	Giant	1969	
"Soft Place in My Heart"	Buddy Holly	Bob Montgomery, Norman Petty	Holly in the Hills	1965	
"Take Your Time"	Buddy Holly	Buddy Holly, Norman Petty	The Buddy Holly Story, Vol. II	1958	
"Tell Me How"	The Crickets	Buddy Holly, Norman Petty, Jerry Allison	The "Chirping" Crickets	1957	
"That Makes It Tough"	Buddy Holly	Buddy Holly	The Buddy Holly Story, Vol. II	1960	
"That'll Be the Day"	The Crickets	Buddy Holly, Jerry Allison, Norman Petty	The "Chirping" Crickets	1957	That'll Be the Day (Note: Decca recording credited to Buddy Holly & The Three Tunes) The Buddy Holly Story
"That's What They Say"	Buddy Holly	Buddy Holly	The Buddy Holly Story, Vol. II	1960	
"Think It Over"	The Crickets	Buddy Holly, Norman Petty, Jerry Allison	The Buddy Holly Story	1958	
"Ting-A-Ling"	Buddy Holly & The Three Tunes	Ahmet Ertegun	That'll Be the Day	1958	
"True Love Ways"	Buddy Holly	Buddy Holly, Norman Petty	The Buddy Holly Story, Vol. II	1960	
"(Ummm, Oh Yeah) Dearest"	Buddy Holly	Mickey Baker, Ellas McDaniel	Showcase	1964	Giant
"Valley of Tears"	Buddy Holly	Fats Domino, Dave Bartholomew	Buddy Holly	1958	
"Wait 'Till the Sun Shines, Nellie"	Buddy Holly	Harry Von Tilzer, Andrew B. Sterling	Reminiscing	1963	
"Well...All Right"	Buddy Holly	Buddy Holly, Jerry Allison, Norman Petty, Joe B. Mauldin	The Buddy Holly Story, Vol. II	1958	
"What to Do"	Buddy Holly	Buddy Holly	The Buddy Holly Story, Vol. II	1960	Holly in the Hills
"Wishing"	Buddy Holly	Buddy Holly, Bob Montgomery	Holly in the Hills	1959	
"Words of Love"	Buddy Holly	Buddy Holly	Buddy Holly	1958	
"You And I Are Through"	Buddy Holly	Bob Montgomery	Holly in the Hills	1965	
"You Are My One Desire"	Buddy Holly	Don Guess	That'll Be the Day	1958	
"You're So Square (Baby I Don't Care)"	Buddy Holly	Jerry Leiber, Mike Stoller	Buddy Holly	1958	
"You're the One"	Buddy Holly	Buddy Holly, Slim Corbin, Waylon Jennings	Showcase	1964	Giant
"You've Got Love'"	The Crickets	Roy Orbison, Johnny Wilson, Norman Petty	The "Chirping" Crickets	1957	

== See also ==
- Buddy Holly discography
