= Buddy Holly discography =

Cataloguing of published recordings by Buddy Holly

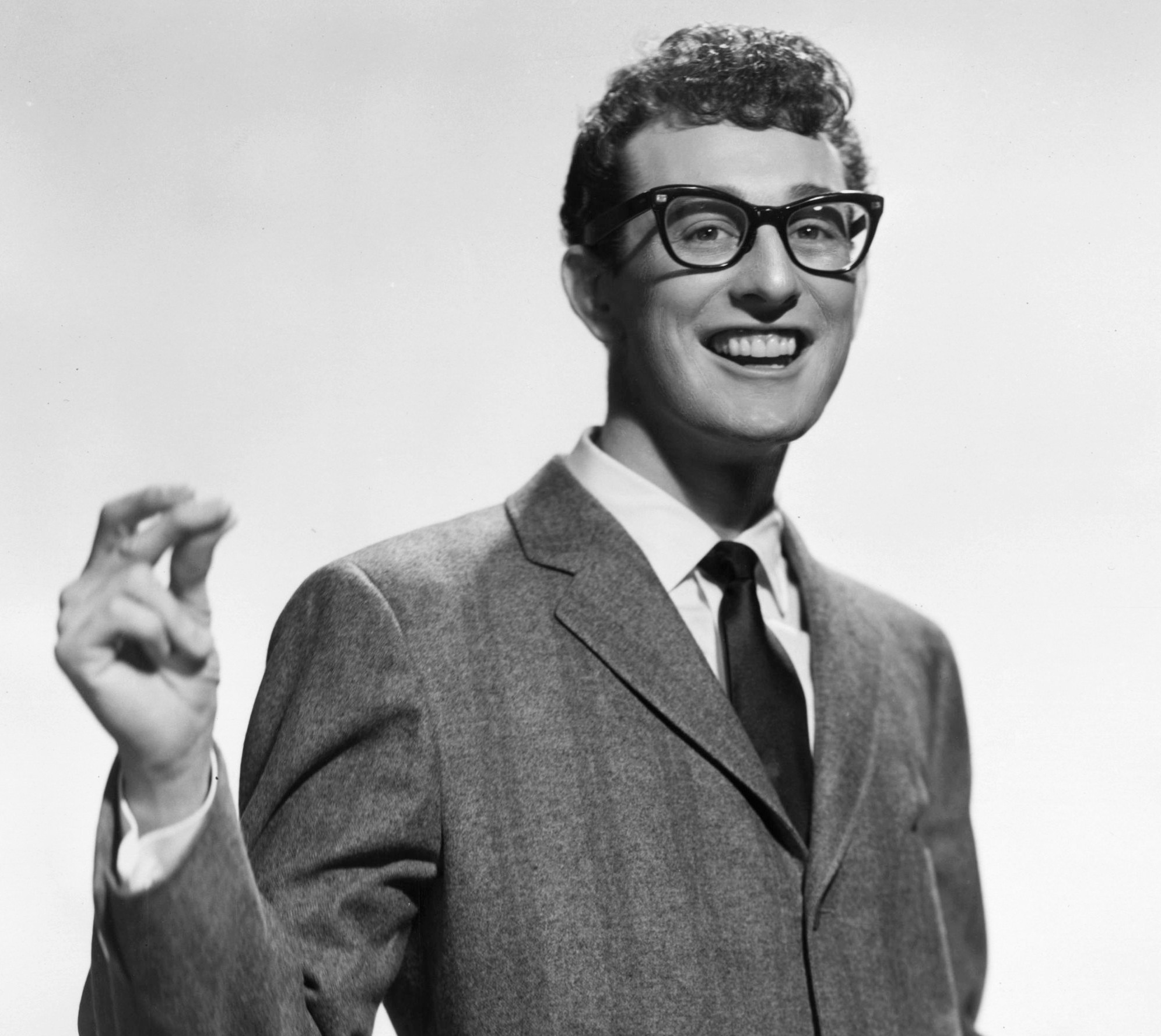
- Buddy Holly in 1958
- Studio albums: 3
- Compilation albums: 32
- Singles: 28

Buddy Holly recorded under several names and with several different backing bands. The Crickets played on almost all of his singles in 1957 and 1958.

Holly recorded prolifically before his death in a plane crash on February 3, 1959. He released three albums in his lifetime. Coral Records was able to release archival new albums and singles for 10 years after his death, but their technical quality was mixed, some being studio recordings and others home recordings.

Holly's records were promoted after his death and had a loyal following, especially in Europe. The demand for unissued recordings by Holly was so great that his producer, Norman Petty, resorted to overdubbing whatever he could find: alternate takes of studio recordings, originally rejected masters, "Crying, Waiting, Hoping" and the other five 1959 tracks (adding new surf-guitar arrangements), and even Holly's amateur demos from 1954 (in which the low-fidelity vocals are often muffled behind added orchestrations). The last new Holly album was Giant (featuring the single "Love Is Strange"), issued in 1969. Between the 1959–1960 overdubs produced by Jack Hansen (with vocal backings imitating the Crickets' sound), the 1960s overdubs produced by Petty, various alternate takes, and Holly's undubbed originals, multiple versions of the same songs are available. There are also many different versions of Holly's Greatest Hits as well as covers and compilation albums of his songs performed by various artists. Many singles and albums of his material have been released posthumously, beginning with "Peggy Sue Got Married" in July 1959 and the successful 6-disc collectors box set Not Fade Away: The Complete Studio Recordings, 50 years later in 2009.

== Albums ==
=== Studio albums ===
Year	Title	Artist	Album details	Peak chart positions
Year	Title	Artist	Album details	UK
1957	The "Chirping" Crickets	The Crickets	Released: November 1957; Label: Brunswick (BL 54038) (mono); Format: Vinyl	5
1958	Buddy Holly	Buddy Holly	Released: March 1958; Label: Coral (CRL 57210) (mono); Format: Vinyl	—
1958	That'll Be the Day	Buddy Holly and the Three Tunes	Released: April 1958; Label: Decca (DL 8707) (mono); Format: Vinyl	5
"—" denotes releases that did not chart.

=== Compilation albums ===
Decade	Title	Album details	Peak chart positions			Certifications
Decade	Title	Album details	US	NZ	UK	Certifications
1950s	The Buddy Holly Story	Released: February 28, 1959; Label: Coral (CRL 57279) (mono); Format: Vinyl	11	—	2	US: Gold
1960s	The Buddy Holly Story, Vol. 2	Released: April 1960; Label: Coral (CRL 57326) (mono); Format: Vinyl	41	—	7	
1960s	Reminiscing	Released: February 1963; Label: Coral (CRL 57426/757426) (mono/stereo); Format: Vinyl	40	—	2	
1960s	Showcase	Released: May 1964; Label: Coral (CRL 57450/757450) (mono/stereo); Format: Vinyl	—	—	3	
1960s	Holly in the Hills	Released: January 1965; Label: Coral (CRL 57463/757463) (mono/stereo); Format: Vinyl	—	—	13	
1960s	The Best of Buddy Holly	Released: April 1966; Label: Coral (CXB-8, mono)/(7CXSB-8, stereo); Format: Vinyl (2 LPs)	—	—	—	UK: Gold
1960s	Buddy Holly's Greatest Hits	Released: March 1967; Label: Coral (CRL 57492/757492) (mono/stereo); Format: Vinyl	—	—	9	
1960s	Giant	Released: March 1969; Label: Coral (CRL 757504) (stereo); Format: Vinyl	—	—	13	
1970s	Buddy Holly: A Rock & Roll Collection	Released: August 1972; Label: Decca (DSXE7-207) (stereo); Format: Vinyl	—	—	—	
1970s	Buddy Holly: Legend	Released: 1974; Label: MCA Coral (CDLM 802); Format: Vinyl (2 LPs)	TBD	TBD	TBD	
1970s	20 Golden Greats also known as Buddy Holly Lives	Released: February 17, 1978; Label: MCA (MCA-3040); EMI (EMTV 8); Format: Vinyl	55	—	1	US: Gold; UK: Platinum
1970s	The Complete Buddy Holly	Released: 1979; Label: MCA (MCA6-80000); Format: Vinyl (box set)	—	—	—	
1980s	Love Songs; 20 Love Songs (US title)	Released: 1981; Label: MCA (MCF 3117); Format: Vinyl	—	—	—	UK: Gold
1980s	The Great Buddy Holly	Released: November 1982; Label: MCA (MCA-31037); Format: Vinyl	—	—	—	
1980s	For the First Time Anywhere	Released: February 1983; Label: MCA (MCA-27059); Format: Vinyl	—	—	—	
1980s	From the Original Master Tapes	Released: 1985; Label: MCA (MCAD-5540); Format: CD	—	—	—	
1980s	True Love Ways	Released: February 1989; Label: Telstar (STAR 2339); Format: Vinyl	—	24	8	UK: Gold
1990s	Words of Love	Released: February 8, 1993; Label: PolyGram TV (5144872); Format: CD	—	20	1	UK: Gold
1990s	The Buddy Holly Collection	Released: September 28, 1993; Label: MCA (MCAD2-10883); Format: CD (2 discs)	—	—	—	
1990s	Greatest Hits	Released: September 24, 1996; Label: MCA (MCAD-11536); Format: CD	—	—	—	
1990s	The Very Best of Buddy Holly	Released: November 25, 1996; Label: Dino (DINCD 133); Format: CD	—	—	24	UK: Gold
1990s	20th Century Masters — The Millennium Collection: The Best of Buddy Holly	Released: April 20, 1999; Label: MCA (MCAD-11956); Format: CD	—	—	—	
1990s	The Very Best of Buddy Holly & the Crickets	Released: August 1999; Label: Universal Music TV (112 046-2/4); Format: CD/Cassette	—	12	13	
2000s	Buddy Holly: Gold	Released: 2005; Label: Geffen/Decca (B0004543-02); Format: CD (2 discs)	—	—	—	
2000s	The Definitive Collection	Released: 2006; Label: Geffen/Decca (B0004710-02); Format: CD	—	—	—	
2000s	Not Fade Away	Released: 2008; Label: Universal Music Special Markets (B009424-02); Format: CD	101	—	—	
2000s	Down the Line: Rarities	Released: January 27, 2009; Label: Geffen/Decca (B0011675-02); Format: CD (2 discs)	—	—	—	
2000s	Memorial Collection	Released: February 10, 2009; Label: Geffen/Decca (B0011337-02); Format: CD (3 discs)	—	—	—	
2000s	Buddy Holly & The Crickets: The Music Didn't Die	Released: 2009; Label: Jasmine (JASCD 531); Format: CD (2 discs)	—	—	—	
2000s	Not Fade Away: The Complete Studio Recordings and More	Released: November 23, 2009; Label: Hip-O Select/UMe (B0012875-02); Format: CD (6 discs)	—	—	—	
2010s	The Very Best of Buddy Holly and the Crickets	Released: April 28, 2014; Label: Not Now Music (NOT3CD154); Format: CD (3 discs)	—	—	—	
2010s	True Love Ways (with the Royal Philharmonic Orchestra)	Released: November 16, 2018; Label: Decca (B0029792-02); Format: CD, digital download	—	—	10	
"—" denotes releases that did not chart.

== Singles ==
Year	Titles (A-side / B-side) (both sides from same album except as noted)	Artist	Label	Chart Positions				Album
Year	Titles (A-side / B-side) (both sides from same album except as noted)	Artist	Label	US Hot 100	US R&B	UK	CAN	Album
1956	"Blue Days–Black Nights" "Love Me"	Buddy Holly	Decca	—	—	—	—	That'll Be the Day
1956	"Modern Don Juan" "You Are My One Desire"	Buddy Holly	Decca	—	—	—	—	That'll Be the Day
1957	"That'll Be the Day" "I'm Looking for Someone to Love"	The Crickets	Brunswick	1	2	1	2	The "Chirping" Crickets
1957	"Words of Love" "Mailman, Bring Me No More Blues"	Buddy Holly	Coral	—	—	—	—	Buddy Holly
1957	"Rock Around with Ollie Vee" "That'll Be the Day"	Buddy Holly	Decca	—	—	—	—	That'll Be the Day
1957	"Peggy Sue" "Everyday"	Buddy Holly	Coral	3	3	6	4	Buddy Holly
1957	"Oh, Boy!" "Not Fade Away"	The Crickets	Brunswick	10	15	3	6	The "Chirping" Crickets
1958	"Love Me" "You Are My One Desire"	Buddy Holly	Decca	—	—	—	—	That'll Be the Day
1958	"I'm Gonna Love You Too" "Listen to Me"	Buddy Holly	Coral	—	—	—	— / 38	Buddy Holly
1958	"Maybe Baby" "Tell Me How"	The Crickets	Brunswick	17	8	4	9	The "Chirping" Crickets
1958	"Rave On" "Take Your Time" (from The Buddy Holly Story Volume II)	Buddy Holly	Coral	37	—	5	12	Buddy Holly
1958	"Think It Over"	The Crickets	Brunswick	27	9	11	45	The Buddy Holly Story
1958	"Fool's Paradise" (from Holly in the Hills)	The Crickets	Brunswick	58	—	—	—	The Buddy Holly Story
1958	"Girl on My Mind" "Ting-a-Ling"	Buddy Holly	Decca	—	—	—	—	That'll Be the Day
1958	"Early in the Morning" "Now We're One" (from The Buddy Holly Story Volume II)	Buddy Holly	Coral	32	—	17	18	The Buddy Holly Story
1958	"It's So Easy" "Lonesome Tears" (from Holly in the Hills)	The Crickets	Brunswick	—	—	—	—	The Buddy Holly Story
1958	"Real Wild Child" "Oh, You Beautiful Doll"	Ivan (pseudonym for Jerry Allison)	Coral	85	—	—	—	Non-LP tracks
1958	"Heartbeat" "Well... All Right" (from The Buddy Holly Story Volume II)	Buddy Holly	Coral	82	4	30	—	The Buddy Holly Story
1959	"It Doesn't Matter Anymore"	Buddy Holly	Coral	13	—	1	1	The Buddy Holly Story
1959	"Raining in My Heart"	Buddy Holly	Coral	88	—	—	—	The Buddy Holly Story
1959	"Peggy Sue Got Married"/ "Crying, Waiting, Hoping"	Buddy Holly	Coral	—	—	13 / —	—	The Buddy Holly Story Volume II
1960	"True Love Ways" "That Makes It Tough"	Buddy Holly	Coral	—	—	25	—	The Buddy Holly Story Volume II
1962	"Reminiscing" "Wait 'Til the Sun Shines, Nellie"	Buddy Holly	Coral	—	—	17	—	Reminiscing
1963	"Bo Diddley" "True Love Ways" (from The Buddy Holly Story Volume II)	Buddy Holly	Coral	116^{A}	—	4	—	Reminiscing
1963	"Brown Eyed Handsome Man" "Wishing" (from Holly in the Hills)	Buddy Holly	Coral	113^{A}	—	3	—	Reminiscing
1964	"I'm Gonna Love You Too" (from Buddy Holly) "Rock Around with Ollie Vee"	Buddy Holly	Coral	—	—	—	—	Showcase
1965	"What to Do" "Slippin' and Slidin'" (from Reminiscing)	Buddy Holly	Coral	—	—	34	—	Holly in the Hills
1969	"Love Is Strange" "You're the One"	Buddy Holly	Coral	105^{A}	—	—	—	Giant
"—" denotes releases that did not chart.

1.Charted on the Bubbling Under Hot 100 Singles chart.

=== Billboard Year-End performances ===
==== Buddy Holly ====
Year	Song	Year-End Position
1958	"Peggy Sue"	50

==== The Crickets ====
Year	Song	Year-End Position
1957	"That'll Be the Day"	30
