= The Buddy Holly Story (album) =

Compilation album by Buddy Holly and the Crickets
- Released: February 28, 1959
- Recorded: February 25, 1957 – May 27, 1958; September 27–28, 1957; January 25, 1958 – October 21, 1958
- Studio: Norman Petty Recording Studios (Clovis, New Mexico); Tinker Air Force Base (Oklahoma City, Oklahoma); Bell Sound (New York City)
- Genre: Rock and roll; pop
- Length: 25:49
- Label: Coral
- Producer: Norman Petty, Dick Jacobs, Bob Thiele

Buddy Holly chronology
That'll Be the Day (1958)	The Buddy Holly Story (1959)	The Buddy Holly Story, Vol. 2 (1960)

The Crickets chronology
The "Chirping" Crickets (1957)	The Buddy Holly Story (1959)	In Style With the Crickets (1960)

Professional ratings
Review scores
Source	Rating
AllMusic	4.5/5 stars
Encyclopedia of Popular Music	5/5 stars

The Buddy Holly Story is the first posthumously released compilation album by Buddy Holly and the Crickets. The album was released on February 28, 1959 by Coral Records less than a month after Holly's death.

The album featured previously released singles by Buddy Holly on both the Brunswick label (with the Crickets) and the Coral label (as a solo artist). The album became a top twenty hit in the United States, Canada, and the United Kingdom.

The album was certified Gold in the U.S. in 1969 by the RIAA.

== Songs ==
Of the twelve songs released on the original album, the songs "Maybe Baby", "That'll Be the Day", "Think It Over", and "Oh, Boy!" were credited to the Crickets, while the rest were credited to Buddy Holly. All of the songs were released as singles and the songs "Peggy Sue", "That'll Be the Day", "Early in the Morning", "Maybe Baby", "Oh, Boy!", "Rave On!", "Think It Over", and "It Doesn't Matter Anymore" all peaked in the Top 40 on the Billboard Hot 100 and the songs "Heartbeat" and "Raining In My Heart" both peaked in the lower half of the Hot 100.

== Concurrent and subsequent releases ==
When Coral Records released The Buddy Holly Story as a 12" 33⅓ rpm LP record, they also released the four songs "It Doesn't Matter Anymore", "Heartbeat", "Raining In My Heart", and "Early in the Morning" – which were included on the LP version – as a 7" 45 rpm EP record which was also titled as The Buddy Holly Story (catalog number EC-81182). The EP peaked at #9 on Billboard magazine's Best Selling Pop EPs chart.

In April 1960, Coral Records released a sequel to The Buddy Holly Story titled The Buddy Holly Story, Vol. 2. The album was also used as the title of the soundtrack album to the 1978 film of the same title.

== Track listing ==
Side 1
No.	Title	Writer(s)	Length
1.	"Raining In My Heart"	Felice and Boudleaux Bryant	2:48
2.	"Early in the Morning"	Bobby Darin, Woody Harris	2:06
3.	"Peggy Sue"	Jerry Allison, Norman Petty	2:29
4.	"Maybe Baby"	Petty, Holly	2:01
5.	"Everyday"	Holly, Petty	2:07
6.	"Rave On!"	Sonny West, Bill Tilghman, Petty	1:49

Side 2
No.	Title	Writer(s)	Length
1.	"That'll Be the Day"	Allison, Petty, Holly	2:17
2.	"Heartbeat"	Holly, Bob Montgomery	2:09
3.	"Think It Over"	Holly, Petty, Allison	1:43
4.	"Oh, Boy!"	West, Tilghman, Petty	2:07
5.	"It's So Easy!"	Holly, Petty	2:09
6.	"It Doesn't Matter Anymore"	Paul Anka	2:04
Total length:			25:49

== Personnel ==
The following people contributed to The Buddy Holly Story:

- Buddy Holly – lead vocals, guitar
- Al Chernet – guitar on "Early in the Morning"
- George Barnes – guitar on "Early in the Morning"
- Sanford Bloch – bass on "Early in the Morning"
- Ernest Hayes – piano on "Early in the Morning"
- Sam "The Man" Taylor – tenor saxophone on "Early in the Morning"
- Panama Francis – drums on "Early in the Morning"
- Philip Krous – drums on "Early in the Morning"
- The Helen Way Singers – backing vocals on "Early in the Morning"
- Niki Sullivan – guitar, backing vocals
- Joe B. Mauldin – bass
- Jerry Allison – drums
- The Picks – backing vocals
- Norman Petty – producer
- Vi Petty - celeste on "Everyday", piano on "Think It Over"
- Al Caiola – guitar on "Rave On!"
- Donald Arnone – rhythm guitar on "Rave On!"
- Bob Thiele – producer on "Rave On!"
- Larry Welborn – bass on "That'll Be the Day"
- June Clark – backing vocals on "That'll Be the Day"
- Gary Tollet – backing vocals on "That'll Be the Day"
- Romano Tollet – backing vocals on "That'll Be the Day"
- Tommy Allsup – lead guitar
- George Alwood – bass on "Heartbeat"
- The Roses – backing vocals
- Dick Jacobs – producer
- Ren Grevatt – liner notes

== Charts ==
The Buddy Holly Story reached #11 on the Billboard 200, #2 in Canada, and peaked at #2 on the UK Albums Chart.
