= Rave On Buddy Holly =

Compilation album by Various artists
- Released: June 28, 2011
- Genre: Pop rock
- Length: 51:34
- Labels: Hear Music, Fantasy/Concord Music Group
- Producers: Randall Poster, Gelya Robb

Rave On Buddy Holly is a compilation album by various artists released on June 28, 2011, through Fantasy Records/Concord Music Group and Hear Music. A tribute album to musician Buddy Holly, who died in a plane crash in 1959 at age 22, the title refers to the song "Rave On", one of his biggest hits. Contributing artists included Paul McCartney, who owned Holly's publishing catalog at the time of the album's release, and Graham Nash, a former member of The Hollies, who were named in commemoration of Holly.

Critical reception of the compilation album was positive overall; many reviewers appreciated the album in its entirety but criticized select performances. Rave On Buddy Holly reached a peak position of number 15 on the Billboard 200 and also charted on the Top Canadian Albums, Top Digital Albums and Top Rock Albums charts. "Dearest", performed by The Black Keys, received a nomination for Best Pop Duo/Group Performance at the 54th Grammy Awards (2012).

A similar 75th birthday tribute album, Listen to Me: Buddy Holly, was issued just over two months later. It contained a similar range of songs, but by a different group of artists—although Zooey Deschanel appears on both albums (as a solo artist on Listen to Me and as a member of She & Him on Rave On).

== Composition ==
The album opens with The Black Keys' "Dearest", just over two minutes in length. Cee Lo Green's vocals on "(You're So Square) Baby I Don't Care" last just ninety-three seconds; the song has a total length of just over one minute and thirty seconds.

== Reception ==
Professional ratings
Review scores
Source	Rating
Allmusic	3.5/5 stars
BBC Music	(positive)
Entertainment Weekly	A−
NPR	(positive)
Pitchfork Media	(3.8/10)
Paste	(8.9/10)
Rolling Stone	3.5/5 stars
The Salt Lake Tribune	A−
Spin	(8/10)

Overall, critical reception of the album was positive, though many reviewers criticized select tracks. Allmusic's Stephen Thomas Erlewine complimented the artists involved for not settling for "mere replications" of Holly's song, for playing "fast and loose", and for "radically reinterpreting the original" recordings. However, Erlewine described Karen Elson's cover of "Crying, Waiting, Hoping" as "overly ornate" and categorized Lou Reed's "Peggy Sue" as "turgid grind". David Fricke of Rolling Stone lauded McCartney's "It's So Easy" and Nash's "Raining in My Heart", describing the latter as a "deft balance of folk-rock sparkle and overcast-afternoon sigh". Fricke also appreciated the contributions by Nick Lowe, Justin Townes Earle, and especially Patti Smith's "Words of Love", which he claimed was delivered as a "precious wish" just as Holly had written. BBC Music contributor Mischa Pearlman complimented performances by Smith, Lou Reed, Cee Lo Green, and Julian Casablancas, as well as Kid Rock's "soulful" cover and Modest Mouse's "hushed reimagining" of "That'll Be the Day". Pearlman also criticized McCartney's performance, writing that he "trie[d] a little too hard", and was disappointed by Fiona Apple and Jon Brion's cover for sounding "almost a carbon copy" of the original. She summarized the album as a "wonderful testament to [Holly's] songwriting prowess, longevity and legacy".

Paste magazine's Jeff Gonick positive review highlighted The Black Keys' "beautifully minimalist" cover, Casablancas' "rich and rocky" title track, My Morning Jacket's "beautifully crafted croon", as well as Modest Mouse's performance. Marc Hogan of Spin magazine gave Rave On Buddy Holly an eight rating on a ten-point scale and described Green's performance as "so good it'll give you hiccups". The Washington Post's Allison Stewart preferred artists whose performances were more similar to the original, including Apple, Elson and Earle; she criticized Modest Mouse and McCartney, whose covers differed greatly from the original, though she complimented Kid Rock's "Detroit soul rave-up" despite its differences. NPR contributor Stephen Thompson wrote a positive review of the album, claiming that the featured musicians "prove to be a nice fit for Holly's timeless words and tunes" and "give this collection the sweetness its source material demands, without losing sight of the melancholy that lies beneath." One reviewer for The Salt Lake Tribune expressed similar sentiment, describing the album as a "fitting, often avant-garde and unusually fun tip of the hat to one of the best penners of melodies ever", specifically highlighting contributions by Green and McCartney.

== Track listing ==
No.	Title	Writer(s)	Performer(s)	Length
1.	"Dearest"	Bob Gibson, Ellas McDaniel, Prentice Herman Polk Jr.	The Black Keys	2:06
2.	"Everyday"	Buddy Holly, Norman Petty	Fiona Apple and Jon Brion	2:19
3.	"It's So Easy"	Buddy Holly, Norman Petty	Paul McCartney	4:35
4.	"Not Fade Away"	Buddy Holly, Norman Petty	Florence and the Machine	4:02
5.	"(You're So Square) Baby, I Don't Care"	Jerry Leiber and Mike Stoller	Cee Lo Green	1:31
6.	"Crying, Waiting, Hoping"	Buddy Holly	Karen Elson	2:25
7.	"Rave On"	Norman Petty, Bill Tilghman, Sonny West	Julian Casablancas	1:55
8.	"I'm Gonna Love You Too"	Joe B. Mauldin, Norman Petty, Niki Sullivan	Jenny O.	2:11
9.	"Maybe Baby"	Buddy Holly, Norman Petty	Justin Townes Earle	2:06
10.	"Oh Boy"	Norman Petty, Bill Tilghman, Sonny West	She & Him	2:18
11.	"Changing All Those Changes"	Buddy Holly	Nick Lowe	1:41
12.	"Words of Love"	Buddy Holly	Patti Smith	3:20
13.	"True Love Ways"	Buddy Holly, Norman Petty	My Morning Jacket	3:25
14.	"That'll Be the Day"	Buddy Holly, Norman Petty, Jerry Allison	Modest Mouse	2:15
15.	"Well All Right"	Jerry Allison, Buddy Holly, Joe Mauldin, Norman Petty	Kid Rock	2:09
16.	"Heartbeat"	Bob Montgomery, Norman Petty	The Detroit Cobras	2:20
17.	"Peggy Sue"	Buddy Holly, Norman Petty, Jerry Allison	Lou Reed	3:19
18.	"Peggy Sue Got Married"	Buddy Holly	John Doe	3:57
19.	"Raining in My Heart"	Felice and Boudleaux Bryant	Graham Nash	3:30
20.	"It's So Easy" (alternate take; iTunes bonus track)	Buddy Holly, Norman Petty	Paul McCartney	2:27

== Personnel ==
- Rob Ackroyd – guitar
- C. C. Adcock – guitar, mixing, percussion, producer
- Jerry Allison – composer
- Laurie Anderson – electric violin
- Rusty Anderson – backing vocals
- Fiona Apple – vocals
- Dan Auerbach – guitar, mixing, organ, vocals
- Johnny Badanjek – drums
- The Black Keys – arranger, producer
- Jake Blanton – bass, guitar, mixing, producer
- Tommy Brenneck – 6-string electric bass, arranger, electric guitar, engineer, keyboards, mixing, slide guitar
- Jon Brion – acoustic guitar, backing vocals, electric guitar, percussion, producer
- Isaac Brock – guitar, vocals
- Boudleaux Bryant – composer
- Felice Bryant – composer
- Greg Calbi – mastering
- Sarth Calhoun – bass
- Patrick Carney – drums
- Justin Carpenter – piano
- Julian Casablancas – vocals
- Eric Caudieux – editing
- Ali Chant – assistant
- Keefus Ciancia – upright piano
- Larissa Collins – art direction
- Bob D'Amico – drums
- Jay Dee Daugherty – drums, percussion
- Zooey Deschanel – vocals
- John Doe – vocals
- Steve Donnelly – guitar
- Karen Elson – vocals
- Dave Feeny – mixing
- Dave Ferguson – acoustic bass, engineer, mixing
- Ryan Freeland – engineer, mixing
- Bob Gibson – composer
- Rich Gilbert – guitar
- Bryce Goggin – engineer
- Mike Green – drums
- Andrew Greene – trumpet
- The Grey Area – producer
- Christopher Hayden – drums, percussion
- Roy Hendrickson – engineer
- Joe Henry – producer
- Terrence Higgens – drums, percussion
- Jimmy Hole – package layout
- Buddy Holly – composer
- Aaron Johnson – trombone
- Clay Jones – engineer, producer
- David Kahne – engineer, mixing, producer
- David Kalish – engineer, Hammond B3
- Fats Kaplin – fiddle
- Lenny Kaye – acoustic guitar
- David Kemper – drums
- Julia Kent – strings
- Kid Rock – engineer, vocal harmony, vocals
- Steve "Doc Ching" King – engineer
- Rob Kleiner – engineer, percussion, piano, snaps
- Greg Koller – engineer, mixing
- Abe Laboriel Jr. – backing vocals, drums
- Dawn Landes – engineer
- Jerry Leiber – composer
- Stewart Lerman – engineer, mixing, producer
- Greg Lesiz – electric guitar
- Fernando Lodeiro – assistant, assistant engineer
- Nick Lowe – acoustic guitar, vocals
- Benji Lysaght – guitar
- Graham Marsh (producer) – acoustic guitar, bass guitar, clapping, engineer, mixing, programming
- Mary Ramirez – guitar
- Chris Masterson – backing vocals, guitar
- Joe Mauldin – composer
- Gary Maurer – mixing
- Joey Mazzola – guitar
- Val McCallum – electric guitar
- Paul McCartney – acoustic guitar, producer, vocals
- Ellas McDaniel – composer
- Scott McPherson – drums
- Konrad Meissner – backing vocals, drums
- Leon Michaels – tenor saxophone
- Lisa Molinaro – viola
- Bob Montgomery – composer
- Rob Moose – strings
- Chris Morrissey – backing vocals, bass
- Rob Morsberger – Hammond B3, organ (pump)
- Nick Movshon – bass guitar
- Jenni Muldaur – backing vocals
- Rachel Nagy – vocals
- Mike Napolitano – mixing
- Graham Nash – Fender Rhodes, percussion, vocals
- William Nash – producer
- Steve Nawara – bass
- Ivan Neville – Wurlitzer
- Jenny O. – percussion, producer, vocals
- John Parish – mixing
- Matt Perine – sousaphone, upright bass
- Norman Petty – composer
- David Piltch – bass
- Prentice Herman Polk Jr. – composer
- John Porter – engineer
- Randall Poster – compilation producer, liner notes
- Vance Powell – engineer, mixing
- Matt Radford – bass
- Bret Rausch – production coordination
- Brian Ray – backing vocals
- James Raymond – arranger, engineer, mixing, piano, producer, programming
- Lou Reed – engineer, guitar, mixing, producer, vocals
- Gelya Robb – compilation producer
- Chris Scruggs – pedal steel
- Adam Selzer – engineer
- Gus Seyffert – mixing
- Tony Shanahan – baritone guitar, double bass, organ (pump), producer, sitar, vocals
- Joshua V. Smith – assistant engineer, mixing assistant
- Patti Smith – vocals
- Sebastian Steinberg – bass
- Homer Steinweiss – arranger, drums
- Mike Stoller – composer
- Bryon Steward - Piano
- Niki Sullivan – composer
- Sean Sullivan – engineer
- Isabella Summers – piano
- Matt Sweeney – arranger, backing vocals, electric bass, electric guitar, guitar, mixing, producer, vocal harmony
- The Tall Boyz – arranger, mixing
- Jared Tankel – baritone saxophone
- Benmont Tench – celeste
- Bill Tilghman – composer
- Entcho Todoro – strings
- Alex Carlos Toval – assistant engineer
- Robert Trehern – drums
- Marc Urselli – engineer, mixing
- M. Ward – guitar, producer
- Joan Wasser – string arrangements, strings
- Mark Watrous – Bas Dessus
- Benjamin Weikel – drums
- Florence Welch – vocals
- Sonny West – composer
- Jack White – drums
- Jack White III – mixing, producer
- Paul "Wix" Wickens – piano
- Hal Willner – producer
- Yim Yames – producer
- Wilder Zoby – transfer assistant

== Chart performance and recognition ==
Rave On Buddy Holly peaked at number 15 on the Billboard 200. The album also reached number twenty-one on the Top Canadian Albums chart, number thirteen on the Top Digital Albums chart, and number two on the Top Rock Albums chart. "Dearest", performed by The Black Keys, received a nomination for Best Pop Duo/Group Performance at the 54th Grammy Awards (2012).

Chart (2011)	Peak position
Canadian Top Albums	21
U.S. Billboard 200	15
U.S. Top Digital Albums	13
U.S. Top Rock Albums	2

== Release history ==
Region	Date	Label	Format	Catalog
United States	June 28, 2011	Hear Music	CD	3267002
United States	June 28, 2011	Fantasy	LP	FAN33123

== See also ==
- Listen to Me: Buddy Holly, another tribute album to Holly released in 2011
- Just Tell Me That You Want Me: A Tribute to Fleetwood Mac, a 2012 tribute album also released by Hear Music as a follow-up to Rave On Buddy Holly
