= Words of Love =

1957 Buddy Holly song

- Vinyl record released by Coral, 1957

Single by Buddy Holly
- B-side: "Mailman, Bring Me No More Blues"
- Released: June 20, 1957
- Recorded: April 8, 1957
- Studio: Norman Petty Recording Studios, Clovis, New Mexico
- Genre: Folk rock
- Length: 1:56
- Label: Coral Records
- Songwriter: Buddy Holly
- Producer: Norman Petty

Buddy Holly singles chronology
"Modern Don Juan" (1956)	"Words of Love" (1957)	"That'll Be the Day" (1957)

Licensed audio
- "Words of Love" on YouTube

"Words of Love" is a ballad written and first recorded by Buddy Holly. When released in 1957, it left little impression.

== Recording ==
Holly recorded the song on April 8, 1957, at Norman Petty Recording Studios in Clovis, New Mexico. Jerry Allison and Joe B. Mauldin accompanied him. Holly overdubbed another vocal onto the original to create a harmony. This was a rather inventive practice for the time, when monaural records were dominant. MacDonald suggests that the vocal harmonies are fashioned after the Everly Brothers' style. The writer Kenneth Womack says Holly created the harmonies by "'bouncing down' during the production process".

== Release and reception ==
The song went largely unnoticed upon its release as a single in June 1957 and was not even issued as a single in the United Kingdom. Nowadays, it is regarded as one of his important recordings and was included on the 20 Golden Greats (1978) collection of Holly numbers. The music historian Mike Segretto credits it with birthing the folk rock genre.

== The Diamonds version ==
A Mercury record of the Diamonds' cover

A doo-wop version by the Diamonds, released by Mercury Records on May 20, 1957, reached number thirteen on the Billboard Hot 100 in July 1957, making the song Holly's first hit, though as a composer not performer. The Diamonds also performed the song live on the ABC television show Circus Time on June 27, 1957, and included it on the 1962 Mercury long play Pop Hits.

== The Beatles version ==
=== Holly's influence on the Beatles ===
Holly toured the United Kingdom with the Crickets in March 1958, a tour that MacDonald credits with steering the growth of British beat music. As a young band, the Beatles admired Holly and included around a dozen of his songs in their repertoire, "Maybe Baby", "Think It Over", "It's So Easy", and "Peggy Sue" among them; they slid in "Words of Love" in 1958. By 1962, they had ceased to perform Holly's songs before a live audience. McCartney would purchase the rights to Holly's catalogue, making up around thirty-eight songs, through his firm MPL Communications.

=== Recording and release ===
"Words of Love"
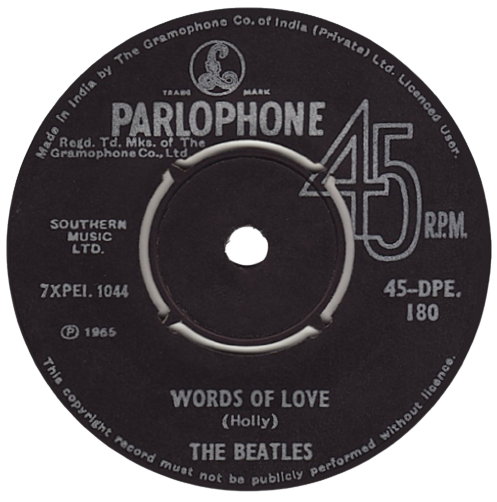
- B-side label of a 1965 Indian release

Song by the Beatles

from the album Beatles for Sale
- Released: December 4, 1964
- Recorded: October 18, 1964
- Studio: EMI, London
- Genre: Pop
- Length: 2:12 (mono); 2:02 (stereo)
- Label: Parlophone
- Songwriter: Buddy Holly
- Producer: George Martin

Music video
- "Words of Love" on YouTube

The Beatles recorded a cover version of "Words of Love" at Abbey Road Studios on October 18, 1964. That same day, they had recorded "I Feel Fine", "I'll Follow the Sun", and other rock covers: the medley of "Kansas City"/"Hey, Hey, Hey, Hey", "Everybody's Trying to Be My Baby" and "Rock and Roll Music". The song was finished in two takes and a vocal overdub. Lennon and McCartney shared the vocals, although when the group performed "Words of Love" from 1958 to 1962, Lennon and George Harrison sang it together. (Note: However, MacDonald discerns George Harrison's singing voice on the recording, not McCartney's.) Lennon plays his Rickenbacker 325 guitar, McCartney plays his Höfner 500/1 bass, Harrison plays his Gretsch Tennessean guitar, and Starr hits a loosely shut packing case with pronounced knocks on the downbeat; thus, he imitates the percussion techniques on Holly's "Everyday". MacDonald comments on their recording: "... the group's version of this rather sickly number sticks close to Holly's while avoiding his feyness and stressing the upper harmony." "Words of Love" was produced by George Martin and engineered by Norman Smith. The mono mix is longer than the stereo mix.

It first appeared in the United States on the album Beatles VI on June 14, 1965. It was also one of four Beatles For Sale tracks on the extended play Beatles for Sale No. 2, which Parlophone issued in the UK on June 4, 1965. The Beatles recorded a version during their BBC sessions; it features on their On Air – Live at the BBC Volume 2 (2013) album.

=== Personnel ===
According to Ian MacDonald and Kenneth Womack:

- John Lennon – lead vocals, rhythm guitar
- Paul McCartney – lead vocals, bass guitar
- George Harrison – lead guitar
- Ringo Starr – drums, packing case

== Other cover versions ==
Pat DiNizio covered the song for his tribute album Pat DiNizio/Buddy Holly in 2009.

Patti Smith's cover of the song appears on the 2011 release Rave On Buddy Holly, a tribute album featuring performances of Holly's music by various artists.
