= The Buddy Holly Story, Vol. 2 =

Compilation album by Buddy Holly
- Released: April 1960
- Recorded: December 19, 1957 – February 14, 1958 in Clovis, New Mexico; June 19 – December 17, 1958 in New York City, New York
- Studio: Norman Petty Recording Studios
- Genres: Rock and roll; pop
- Length: 26:30
- Label: Coral LVA.9127 (MG.7532)
- Producers: Norman Petty; Buddy Holly; Jack Hansen

Buddy Holly chronology
The Buddy Holly Story (1959)	The Buddy Holly Story, Vol. 2 (1960)	Reminiscing (1963)

Singles from The Buddy Holly Story, Vol. II
- 1. "Peggy Sue Got Married" / "Crying, Waiting, Hoping" Released: September 1959; 2. "True Love Ways / "Moondreams" / "That Makes It Tough" Released: May 1960 (UK) / June 1960 (US); 3. "Learning The Game" / "That Makes It Tough" Released: October 1960; 4. "What To Do" / "That's What They Say" Released: January 1961

Professional ratings
Review scores
Source	Rating
AllMusic	3/5 stars

The Buddy Holly Story, Vol. II is the fifth album released by Buddy Holly, a sequel compilation to The Buddy Holly Story (1959). The second album to be released posthumously, it is also the first of a series of Buddy Holly albums to feature overdubbing of unfinished tracks, including Holly's last original compositions.

"Little Baby" was originally from Holly's eponymous solo album, "Now We're One" was originally the B-side to "Early in the Morning", and "Take Your Time" was the B-Side to "Rave On!". The remaining tracks were unfinished acoustic demos recorded by Holly in 1959 that were overdubbed by Jack Hansen. Three singles from these sessions were released; "Peggy Sue Got Married", "Learning the Game", and "That Makes it Tough". "Moondreams" was also previously unreleased.

== Track listing ==
Side 1
No.	Title	Writer(s)	Length
1.	"Peggy Sue Got Married"	Buddy Holly	2:05
2.	"Well . . . All Right"	Holly, Jerry Allison, Norman Petty, Joe B. Mauldin	2:12
3.	"What to Do"	Holly	1:54
4.	"That Makes It Tough"	Holly	2:22
5.	"Now We're One"	Bobby Darin	2:03
6.	"Take Your Time"	Petty, Holly	1:56

Side 2
No.	Title	Writer(s)	Length
7.	"Crying, Waiting, Hoping"	Holly	2:04
8.	"True Love Ways"	Petty, Holly	2:52
9.	"Learning The Game"	Holly	2:03
10.	"Little Baby"	Petty, Holly, C. W. Kendall Jr.	1:57
11.	"Moondreams"	Petty	2:42
12.	"That's What They Say"	Holly	2:20
Total length:			26:30

== Charts ==
=== Album ===
Chart (1960)	Peak position
UK Album Charts	7
