= Buddy Holly (disambiguation) =

Buddy Holly (1936–1959) was an American rock and roll singer.

Buddy Holly may also refer to:

- Buddy Holly (album), Holly's 1958 self-titled debut album
- Buddy Holly (song), 1994 song by the rock band Weezer
