= The "Chirping" Crickets =

Studio album by the Crickets
- Released: November 27, 1957
- Recorded: February 25 – September 27, 1957
- Studios: Norman Petty Recording Studios (Clovis, New Mexico); Tinker Air Force Base Officers' Club (Oklahoma City, Oklahoma)
- Genres: Rock and roll; rockabilly
- Length: 26:02
- Label: Brunswick
- Producer: Norman Petty

The Crickets chronology
The "Chirping" Crickets (1957)	Buddy Holly (1958)

Alternative Cover
- Australian & New Zealand cover

Reissue Cover
- Buddy Holly and the Crickets (Coral, 1962)

Singles from The "Chirping" Crickets
- 1. "That'll Be the Day" Released: July 1957; 2. "Oh, Boy!" Released: 27 October 1957; 3. "Maybe Baby" Released: January 1958

Professional ratings
Review scores
Source	Rating
Allmusic	5/5 stars
The Rolling Stone Record Guide	5/5 stars
Encyclopedia of Popular Music	5/5 stars

The "Chirping" Crickets is the only studio album credited to the American rock and roll band the Crickets from the period when they were led by Buddy Holly. It was also the only album released under the group's name during Holly's lifetime. It was issued by Brunswick Records in the U.S. on November 27, 1957, and by Coral Records in the UK in March 1958. It was re-released by Coral Records in 1962, under the title Buddy Holly and the Crickets.

The album contains the group's U.S. and UK number one single "That'll Be the Day", along with the U.S. Top 10 hit "Oh, Boy!" and the U.S. Top 20 hit "Maybe Baby". Writing for the AllMusic website, critic William Ruhlmann described the album's three singles, along with the tracks "Not Fade Away" and "I'm Looking for Someone to Love", as being "among the best rock & roll songs of the 1950s or ever, making this one of the most significant album debuts in rock & roll history."

In 2012, the album was ranked at number 420 on Rolling Stone magazine's list of the 500 greatest albums of all time. It also appears in the book 1001 Albums You Must Hear Before You Die. In July 2019, the album was the subject for the BBC Four documentary Classic Albums: The Crickets: The 'Chirping' Crickets.

After being out of print for many years, The "Chirping" Crickets was reissued as a remastered CD in 2004 with bonus tracks. In 2023, the album was reissued by Rollercoaster Records as The Alternative "Chirping" Crickets in a CD package containing remixed mono and stereo versions of the album, along with the twelve tracks in stereo without the backing vocals by vocal group the Picks, which the Crickets felt were intrusive and inappropriate.

== Track listing ==
Side 1
No.	Title	Writer(s)	Length
1.	"Oh, Boy!"	Sonny West, Bill Tilghman, Norman Petty	2:08
2.	"Not Fade Away"	Buddy Holly, Petty	2:23
3.	"You've Got Love"	Roy Orbison, Johnny Wilson, Petty	2:08
4.	"Maybe Baby"	Holly, Petty	2:03
5.	"It's Too Late"	Chuck Willis	2:24
6.	"Tell Me How"	Holly, Petty, Jerry Allison	2:01

Side 2
No.	Title	Writer(s)	Length
7.	"That'll Be the Day" (May 27, 1957 Brunswick version)	Holly, Allison, Petty	2:16
8.	"I'm Looking for Someone to Love"	Holly, Petty	1:59
9.	"An Empty Cup (And a Broken Date)"	Orbison, Petty	2:15
10.	"Send Me Some Lovin'"	John Marascalco, Leo Price	2:37
11.	"Last Night"	Joe B. Mauldin, Petty	1:56
12.	"Rock Me My Baby"	Shorty Long, Susan Heather	1:52

== Personnel ==
Adapted from the liner notes of the 1992 Sequel Records CD reissue of the album:

Buddy Holly and the Crickets

- Buddy Holly – lead vocals, lead guitar, rhythm guitar, acoustic guitar on "It's Too Late", backing vocals on "Not Fade Away"
- Jerry Allison – drums; cardboard box percussion and backing vocals on "Not Fade Away"
- Joe B. Mauldin – double bass (except "That'll Be the Day" and "I'm Looking for Someone to Love"), backing vocals on "Not Fade Away"
- Niki Sullivan – rhythm guitar (except on "Oh, Boy!", "Not Fade Away", "It's Too Late", and "An Empty Cup (And a Broken Date)"; backing vocals on “Not Fade Away”, “That’ll Be the Day”, and “I’m Looking for Someone to Love”

Additional personnel

- Larry Welborn – double bass on "That'll Be the Day" and "I'm Looking for Someone to Love"
- The Picks (Bill Pickering, John Pickering and Bob Lapham) – backing vocals, except on "Not Fade Away", "That'll Be the Day", and "I'm Looking for Someone to Love"
- Ramona and Gary Tollett – backing vocals on "That'll Be the Day" and "I'm Looking for Someone to Love"
- June Clark – possible backing vocals on "That'll Be the Day" and "I'm Looking for Someone to Love"

== Charts ==
=== Album ===
Year	Chart	Position
1958	UK Albums Chart	5

=== Singles ===
Year	Single	Position		
Year	Single	Billboard Hot 100	R&B Singles	UK Singles Chart
1957	"That'll Be the Day"	1	2	1
1958	"Oh Boy"	10	13	3
1958	"Maybe Baby"	17	8	4
