= Buddy Holly (album) =

Studio album by Buddy Holly
- Released: February 20, 1958
- Recorded: April 8, 1957 – January 26, 1958
- Studio: Norman Petty Recording (Clovis, New Mexico); Bell Sound (New York City)
- Genre: Rock and roll; pop; rockabilly
- Length: 24:35
- Label: Coral
- Producer: Norman Petty, Bob Thiele, Milton DeLugg ("Rave On")

Buddy Holly chronology
The "Chirping" Crickets (1957)	Buddy Holly (1958)	That'll Be the Day (1958)

Singles from Buddy Holly
- 1. "Words of Love" Released: 20 June 1957; 2. "Peggy Sue" Released: 20 September 1957; 3. "I'm Gonna Love You Too" Released: 5 February 1958; 4. "Rave On!" Released: 20 April 1958

Professional ratings
Review scores
Source	Rating
AllMusic	4.5/5 stars
Encyclopedia of Popular Music	5/5 stars
The Rolling Stone Record Guide	5/5 stars

Buddy Holly is the debut solo studio album by Buddy Holly. It was released by Coral Records on February 20, 1958. The album, featuring a rare photo of Holly without his trademark glasses on the front cover, collects Holly's four hit singles released on the Coral label; "Words of Love", "Peggy Sue", "I'm Gonna Love You Too", and "Rave On!". The backing group was Buddy Holly's band, the Crickets.

== Release history ==
It was first re-issued on compact disc in 1988 in the UK with a different cover.

Some re-releases include the tracks from Holly's next single, "Early in the Morning" backed with "Now We're One", and "Take Your Time", the B-side of the single "Rave On".

It was re-released again in Spain with different cover art in 2015 by WaxTime Records on 180 Gram Vinyl. This edition included the original liner notes and two extra tracks: "Now We're One" (issued as the B-side of Holly's "Early in the Morning") and "Ting-A-Ling". It also included new liner notes written by Gary Blailock in September 2014.

== Track listing ==
Side 1
No.	Title	Writer(s)	Length
1.	"I'm Gonna Love You Too"	Joe B. Mauldin, Niki Sullivan, Norman Petty	2:14
2.	"Peggy Sue"	Jerry Allison, Norman Petty	2:30
3.	"Look at Me"	Jerry Allison, Norman Petty	2:07
4.	"Listen to Me"	Buddy Holly, Norman Petty	2:22
5.	"Valley of Tears"	Fats Domino, Dave Bartholomew	2:09
6.	"Ready Teddy"	Robert Blackwell, John Marascalco	1:32

Side 2
No.	Title	Writer(s)	Length
1.	"Everyday"	Buddy Holly, Norman Petty	2:09
2.	"Mailman, Bring Me No More Blues"	Ruth Roberts, Bill Katz, Stanley Clayton	2:12
3.	"Words of Love"	Buddy Holly	1:56
4.	"You're So Square (Baby I Don't Care)"	Jerry Leiber, Mike Stoller	1:37
5.	"Rave On"	Sonny West, Bill Tilghman, Norman Petty	1:50
6.	"Little Baby"	Norman Petty, C.W. Kendall Jr.	1:57

1999 Bonus tracks

No.	Title	Writer(s)	Length
1.	"That's My Desire"	Carroll Loveday, Helmy Kresa	2:25
2.	"Think It Over"	Buddy Holly, Jerry Allison, Norman Petty	1:45
3.	"Fool's Paradise"	Horace Linsley, Norman Petty, Sonny Le Glaire	2:30
4.	"Well... All Right"	Buddy Holly, Jerry Allison, Joe B. Mauldin, Norman Petty	2:14
5.	"Take Your Time"	Buddy Holly, Norman Petty	1:58

== Personnel ==
The Crickets

- Buddy Holly - vocals, guitar
- Joe B. Mauldin - bass
- Jerry Allison - drums
- Niki Sullivan - rhythm guitar (track 6)

Additional personnel

- Norman Petty - organ (track 5), piano (track 11)
- Vi Petty - piano (tracks 3, 5, 6, 8), celesta (track 7)
- C. W. Kendall Jr. - piano (tracks 3, 10, 12)
- Al Caiola - guitar (track 11)
- Donald Arnone - guitar (track 11)
- William Marihe - backing vocals (track 11)
- Robert Bollinger - backing vocals (track 11)
- Robert Harter - backing vocals (track 11)
- Merrill Ostrus - backing vocals (track 11)
- Abby Hoffer - backing vocals (track 11)

== Charts ==
Single

Year	Single	Chart	Position
1957	"Peggy Sue"	Billboard Pop Singles	3
