= Reminiscing (Buddy Holly album) =

Compilation album by Buddy Holly
- Released: February 1963
- Recorded: 1956–1959 and 1962 at Norman Petty Studios in Clovis, New Mexico
- Genre: Rock and roll; rockabilly
- Length: 24:49 (original); 40:13 (reissue)
- Label: Coral
- Producer: Norman Petty

Buddy Holly chronology
The Buddy Holly Story, Vol. 2 (1960)	Reminiscing (1963)	Showcase (1964)

Singles from Reminiscing
- 1. "Reminiscing" Released: August 1962; 2. "Bo Diddley" Released: March 1963; 3. "Brown Eyed Handsome Man" Released: July 1963

Professional ratings
Review scores
Source	Rating
AllMusic	4.5/5 stars

Reminiscing is a compilation album by American singer-songwriter Buddy Holly. The album was released as an LP record in both mono and stereo formats in February 1963 (see 1963 in music). Reminiscing was Buddy Holly's third posthumously released album and the second album to feature previously unreleased material. The original recordings were overdubbed by the Fireballs in 1962 and many of the undubbed recordings appeared on For the First Time Anywhere in 1983.

== Track listing ==
Original album

Side one
No.	Title	Writer(s)	Length
1.	"Reminiscing"	King Curtis	1:57
2.	"Slippin' and Slidin'"	Little Richard, Eddie Bo, Al Collins, James Smith	3:29
3.	"Bo Diddley"	Ellas McDaniel	2:23
4.	"Wait 'Till the Sun Shines, Nellie"	Harry Von Tilzer, Andrew B. Sterling	1:57
5.	"Baby, Won't You Come Out Tonight"	Buddy Holly, Don Guess	1:55

Side two
No.	Title	Writer(s)	Length
1.	"Brown Eyed Handsome Man"	Chuck Berry	2:07
2.	"Because I Love You"	Buddy Holly	2:41
3.	"It's Not My Fault"	Ben Hall, Weldon Myrick	1:52
4.	"I'm Gonna Set My Foot Down"	Buddy Holly	2:19
5.	"Changing All Those Changes"	Buddy Holly	1:44
6.	"Rock-A-Bye Rock"	Buddy Holly	2:22

1999 Bonus tracks

No.	Title	Writer(s)	Length
1.	"Come Back Baby"	Buddy Holly, Norman Petty	1:48
2.	"Maybe Baby" (original take)	Buddy Holly, Norman Petty	1:58
3.	"Rock-A-Bye Rock"	Buddy Holly	2:23
4.	"It's Not My Fault" (1983 overdubbed version)	Hall, Myrick	1:21
5.	"Brown Eyed Handsome Man"	Chuck Berry	2:03
6.	"Slippin' and Slidin'" (single version)	Richard, Bo, Collins, Smith	3:32
7.	"Bo Diddley" (overdubbed version)	Elias McDaniel	2:22

== Personnel ==
The following people contributed to Reminiscing:

- Buddy Holly – lead vocals, guitar
- Jerry Allison – drums
- Sonny Curtis – guitar
- Don Guess – bass
- Larry Welborn – bass
- Joe B. Mauldin – bass
- George Tomsco – overdubbed guitar
- Keith McCormack – overdubbed rhythm guitar
- Stan Lark – overdubbed bass
- Lyn Baily – overdubbed bass
- Doug Roberts – overdubbed drums
- King Curtis – tenor saxophone on "Reminiscing"
- Norman Petty – producer

== Charts ==
=== Album ===
Year	Chart	Position
1963	UK Albums Chart	2
1963	Billboard 200	40

== Release history ==
Region	Date	Label	Format	Catalog
United States	February 1963	Coral Records	mono LP	CRL 57426
United States	February 1963	Coral Records	stereo LP	CRL 757426
United Kingdom	March 1963	Coral Records	mono LP	LVA 9212
United States	February 1989	MCA Records	Cassette	MCAC 1826
United States	February 1989	MCA Records	CD	MCAD 1826
United Kingdom	November 1992	Castle Records	CD	CLACD 308
Japan	1999	MCA Records	CD	UICY-112099
