= Holly in the Hills =

Compilation album by Buddy Holly and Bob Montgomery
- Released: January 1965
- Recorded: 1954–1958 and 1964-1965
- Studio: Norman Petty Recording Studios (Clovis, New Mexico)
- Genre: Country
- Length: 26:26
- Label: Coral
- Producer: Norman Petty

Buddy Holly chronology
Showcase (1964)	Holly in the Hills (1965)	The Best of Buddy Holly (1966)

Professional ratings
Review scores
Source	Rating
AllMusic	3/5 stars
Record Mirror	4/5 stars

Holly in the Hills is a compilation album by American singer Buddy Holly, including songs featuring Bob Montgomery originally released under "Buddy & Bob". The album was released as an LP record in both mono and stereo formats in January 1965.

Holly in the Hills was Buddy Holly's fifth posthumously released album and the fourth album to feature previously unreleased material. The original recordings were overdubbed by the Fireballs in 1964 and 1965.

The album was released on compact disc in 2002 by BGO Records in the UK.

== Track listing ==
Side A

1. "I Wanna Play House with You" - 2:22
2. "Door to My Heart" - 2:24
3. "Fool's Paradise" - 1:52
4. "I Gambled My Heart" - 2:43
5. "What to Do" - 2:16
6. "Wishing" - 2:03

Side B

1. "Down the Line" - 2:04
2. "Soft Place in My Heart" - 2:16
3. "Lonesome Tears" - 1:49
4. "Gotta Get You Near Me Blues" - 1:54
5. "Flower of My Heart" - 2:36
6. "You And I Are Through" - 2:07

== Charts ==
Chart (1965)	Peak position
UK Albums Chart	13
