= Giant (Buddy Holly album) =

Compilation album by Buddy Holly
- Released: January 1969
- Recorded: 1956–1959 and 1963
- Studio: Norman Petty Recording Studios (Clovis, New Mexico)
- Genre: Rock and roll; rockabilly
- Length: 21:04
- Label: Coral
- Producer: Norman Petty

Buddy Holly chronology
Buddy Holly's Greatest Hits (1967)	Giant (1969)	Good Rockin (1971)

Professional ratings
Review scores
Source	Rating
AllMusic	2/5 stars

Giant is a compilation album by American rock and roll singer Buddy Holly. The album was released as an LP record in stereo format in January 1969 (see 1969 in music).

Giant was Buddy Holly's eighth posthumously released album and the fifth album to feature previously unreleased material. The original recordings were overdubbed by the Fireballs in 1963.

The album was released on CD for the first time in 1993 by Castle Communications in the UK.

== Track listing ==
Side A

1. "Love is Strange" (Ethel Smith, Mickey Baker) - 3:04
2. "Good Rockin' Tonight" (Roy Brown) - 2:01
3. "Blue Monday" (Dave Bartholomew, Antoine Domino) - 2:02
4. "Have You Ever Been Lonely (Have You Ever Been Blue)" (George Brown, Peter De Rose) - 1:27
5. "Slippin' and Slidin'" (Al Collins, Edwin Bocage, James Smith, Richard Penniman) - 2:33

Side B

1. "You're the One" (Buddy Holly, Slim Corbin, Waylon Jennings) - 2:04
2. "(Ummm, Oh Yeah) Dearest" (Bob Gibson, Ellas McDaniel, Prentice Herman Polk, Jr.) - 1:53
3. "Smokey Joe's Cafe" (Jerry Leiber, Mike Stoller) - 2:14
4. "Ain't Got No Home" (Clarence Henry) - 2:04
5. "Holly Hop" (Charles Hardin Holley) - 1:42

== Charts ==
=== Album ===
Chart (1969)	Peak position
UK Album Charts	14
