= Baby Let's Play House =

1954 song by Arthur Gunter

"Baby Let's Play House" is a song written and originally recorded by Arthur Gunter in 1954 on the Excello Records label, and covered by Elvis Presley the following year on Sun Records. A line from the song ("I'd rather see you dead, little girl, than to be with another man") was borrowed by John Lennon for his Beatles song "Run for Your Life", released on Rubber Soul in 1965.

== Elvis Presley version ==
"Baby Let's Play House"

Single by Elvis Presley
- B-side: "I'm Left, You're Right, She's Gone"
- Released: April 10, 1955
- Recorded: February 1955
- Genre: Rockabilly; rock and roll
- Length: 2:15
- Label: Sun 217
- Songwriter: Arthur Gunter

Elvis Presley singles chronology
| "Milkcow Blues Boogie" (1955) | "Baby Let's Play House" (1955) | "I Forgot to Remember to Forget" (1955) |

The Presley version differs greatly from the original: Presley started the song with the chorus, where Gunter began with the first verse, and he replaced Gunter's line "You may get religion" with the words "You may have a Pink Cadillac", referring to his custom-painted 1955 Cadillac auto, that had also been serving as the band's transportation at the time. "Baby Let's Play House" was on the fourth issue of a Presley record by Sun, and became the first song recorded by Presley to appear on a national chart when it made number 5 on the Billboard Country Singles chart in July 1955.

=== Personnel ===
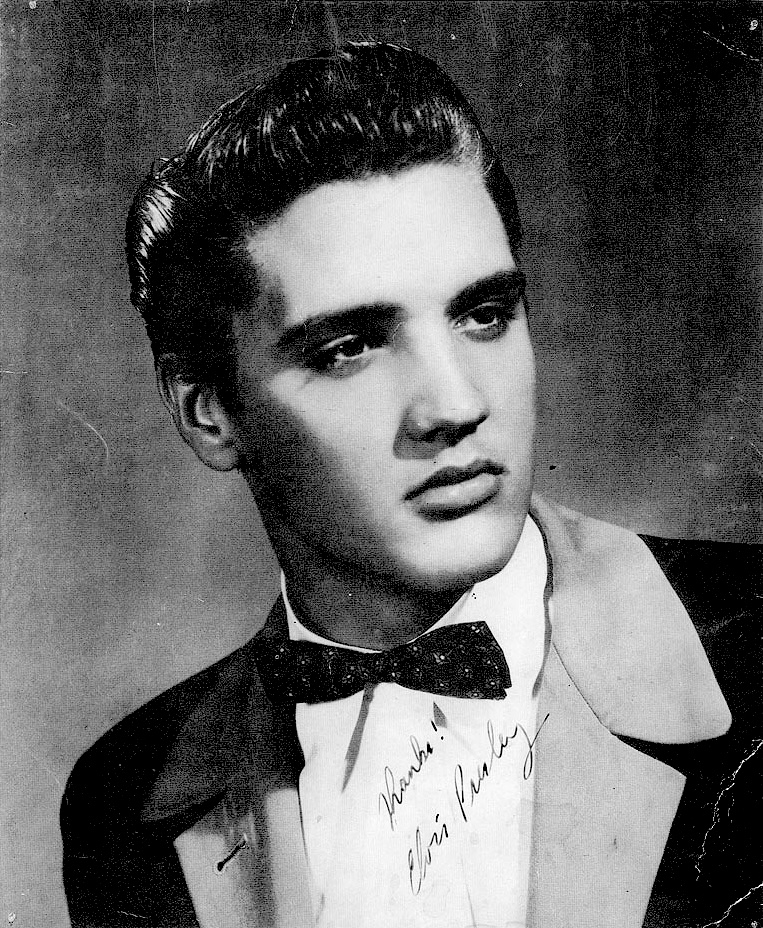
Promotional photo of Elvis Presley, 1954

- Elvis Presley – lead vocals, acoustic rhythm guitar
- Scotty Moore – electric lead guitar
- Bill Black – double bass

=== Weekly charts ===
| Chart (1955) | Peak position |
|---|---|
| US Billboard Country Singles | 5 |

| Chart (2008) | Peak position |
|---|---|
| Italy (FIMI) | 1 |
| Spain (Promusicae) | 3 |
| Sweden (Sverigetopplistan) | 23 |
| UK Singles (Official Charts) | 84 |

== Notable cover versions ==
- Buddy Holly did a cover which appears on his posthumous album Holly in the Hills
- On July 6, 1957, John Lennon covered "Baby Let's Play House" in the evening set at the Woolton church fete. Note: this was the day Lennon met Paul McCartney.
- In 2008, a Spankox remix of the song made number 84 in the UK.
