= Showcase (Buddy Holly album) =

Compilation album by Buddy Holly
- Released: May 1964
- Recorded: 1956–1959 and 1963
- Studio: Norman Petty Recording Studios (Clovis, New Mexico)
- Genre: Rock and roll; rockabilly
- Length: 23:28
- Label: Coral
- Producer: Norman Petty

Buddy Holly chronology
Reminiscing (1963)	Showcase (1964)	Holly in the Hills (1965)

Professional ratings
Review scores
Source	Rating
AllMusic	3/5 stars
Record Mirror	4/5 stars

Showcase is a compilation album by American rock and roll singer Buddy Holly. The album was released as an LP record in both mono and stereo formats in May 1964 (see 1964 in music).

Showcase was Buddy Holly's fourth posthumously released album and the third album to feature previously unreleased material. The original recordings were overdubbed by the Fireballs in 1963.

The album was released on CD for the first time in 1992 by Castle Communications in the UK.

== Track listing ==
Side A

1. "Shake, Rattle and Roll" - 1:24
2. "Rock Around with Ollie Vee" - 2:13
3. "Honky Tonk" - 3:28
4. "I Guess I Was Just a Fool" - 2:16
5. "(Ummm, Oh Yeah) Dearest" - 1:54
6. "You're the One" - 1:32

Side B

1. "Blue Suede Shoes" - 1:55
2. "Come Back Baby" - 1:49
3. "Rip It Up" - 1:28
4. "Love's Made a Fool of You" - 2:00
5. "Gone" - 1:12
6. "Girl On My Mind" - 2:17

== Charts ==
Chart (1964)	Peak position
UK Albums Chart	3
