= Heartbeat (Buddy Holly song) =

Song by Buddy Holly

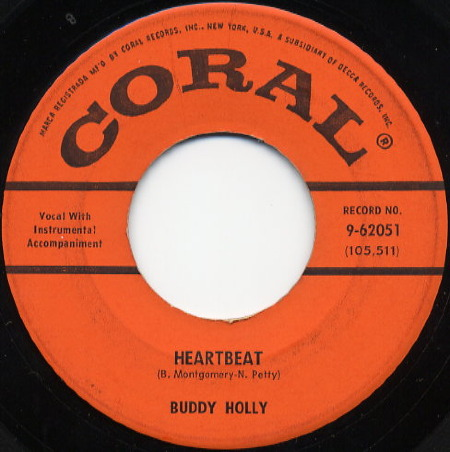

Single by Buddy Holly
- B-side: "Well... All Right"
- Released: November 5, 1958
- Recorded: August 1958
- Studio: Norman Petty Recording Studios (Clovis, New Mexico)
- Genre: Rock and roll, pop rock
- Length: 2:11
- Label: Coral Records
- Songwriters: Bob Montgomery, Norman Petty
- Producer: Norman Petty

Buddy Holly singles chronology
"Early in the Morning" (1958)	"Heartbeat" (1958)	"It Doesn't Matter Anymore" (1959)

"Heartbeat" is a rockabilly song recorded by Buddy Holly and released in 1958 as a single on Coral Records. It was written by Bob Montgomery and Norman Petty. Buddy Holly's recording charted in the US and the UK.

The B-side of the single was "Well... All Right" written by Buddy Holly, Norman Petty, Jerry Allison, and Joe Mauldin, which would be covered by Blind Faith and Santana.

"Heartbeat" was covered and reached the UK top 10 twice: once in 1975 for Showaddywaddy at number seven and again in 1992 for Nick Berry, recorded as the theme to the television series Heartbeat, which reached number two.

== Hit versions ==
"Heartbeat" was the second to last of Holly's singles to be released during his lifetime. It was a minor hit in the United States, reaching number 82 on the Billboard Hot 100 chart.

Holly's single had more chart impact in the United Kingdom, reaching number 30 in January 1959 and again upon its reissue in April 1960. In the interim between the two UK chartings of the Holly original, a remake by the Dale Sisters (His Master's Voice POP 710) reached number 33 in the UK.

"Heartbeat" subsequently reached the UK top 10 twice. Firstly in 1975 for Showaddywaddy, number seven that September, and again in 1992 when Nick Berry's version, recorded as the theme to the television series Heartbeat, in which he starred, reached number two that June. Tommy Allsup played the lead guitar part on the recording.

== Charts ==
=== Buddy Holly version ===
Chart (1959)	Peak position
UK Singles (Official Charts)	30
US Billboard Hot 100	82

=== Showaddywaddy version ===
Chart (1975)	Peak position
Ireland (IRMA)	5
UK Singles (Official Charts)	7
West Germany (GfK)	21

=== Nick Berry version ===
==== Weekly charts ====
Chart (1992)	Peak position
Europe (Eurochart Hot 100)	11
Ireland (IRMA)	18
UK Singles (Official Charts)	2
UK Airplay (Music Week)	18

==== Year-end charts ====
Chart (1992)	Position
UK Singles (OCC)	35

== Cover versions of "Heartbeat" ==
Versions of "Heartbeat" have appeared on albums by:

- Tommy Roe (Sheila, 1962)
- Bobby Vee (I Remember Buddy Holly, 1963)
- Herman's Hermits — who had originally been named the Heartbeats after the Buddy Holly song (Herman's Hermits on Tour, 1965)
- Dave Berry (One Dozen Berries, 1966)
- Skeeter Davis (Skeeter Sings Buddy Holly, 1967)
- Cliff Richard (Don't Stop Me Now, 1967; also a non-charting US single release)
- Humble Pie (Town and Country, 1969)
- Cilla Black (It Makes Me Feel So Good, 1976)
- Denny Laine, guitarist of Wings and Moody Blues fame, covered the song on his 1977 Buddy Holly tribute album, Holly Days, produced by Paul McCartney.
- The Knack (Get the Knack, 1979)
- The Hollies, who had named themselves after Buddy Holly, made their only attempt at having a hit remake of a Buddy Holly song with a 1980 single release of "Heartbeat", a midtempo version that charted at number 82 on the Billboard Hot 100.
- A Dutch rendering of "Heartbeat" was recorded in 1982 by Ciska Peters (nl).
- "Heartbeat" served as the title cut for a 1993 album release by Hank Marvin. (Cliff Richard provided the background vocal on the instrumental track). Marvin's album reached number 17 in the UK.
- Connie Francis (With Love to Buddy, 1996)
- Mike Berry (Buddy — a Life in Music, 1999)
- P. J. Proby (Sentimental Journey, 2003)
- On the 2004 album, The Crickets and Their Buddies, which featured various vocalists fronting Buddy Holly's band the Crickets, Nanci Griffith provided the vocal on a remake of "Heartbeat".
- Black Tambourine (Black Tambourine, 2010)

== Cover versions of "Well... All Right" ==
The B-side of the single, "Well... All Right", was covered by:

- Blind Faith on their self-titled debut album.
- Waylon Jennings recorded "Well... All Right" as part of a medley released as a bonus track for his 1974 album This Time
- Santana on the Inner Secrets album in 1978. This version peaked at #69 on the US Hot 100. The single peaked at #53 on the UK charts.
- Alain Bashung on his album Osez Joséphine in 1991.
- Nanci Griffith (with the remaining members of The Crickets) on the Not Fade Away (Remembering Buddy Holly) tribute album in 1996.
- Albert Hammond, Jr. on his album Yours to Keep in 2006.
- The Detroit Cobras on the Rave On Buddy Holly tribute album in 2011.
- Lyle Lovett on the Listen to Me: Buddy Holly tribute album in 2011.
- The Smithereens recorded in 2008, released on their album Covers in 2018.
- Pen Ran recorded her own version of the song during the early 1970s. The title is "Enjurng Lerng Rom" but in English that says "Come to Dance".

== See also ==
- Poor Me
- Buddy Holly discography
