= Love Is Strange =

1956 single by Mickey & Sylvia

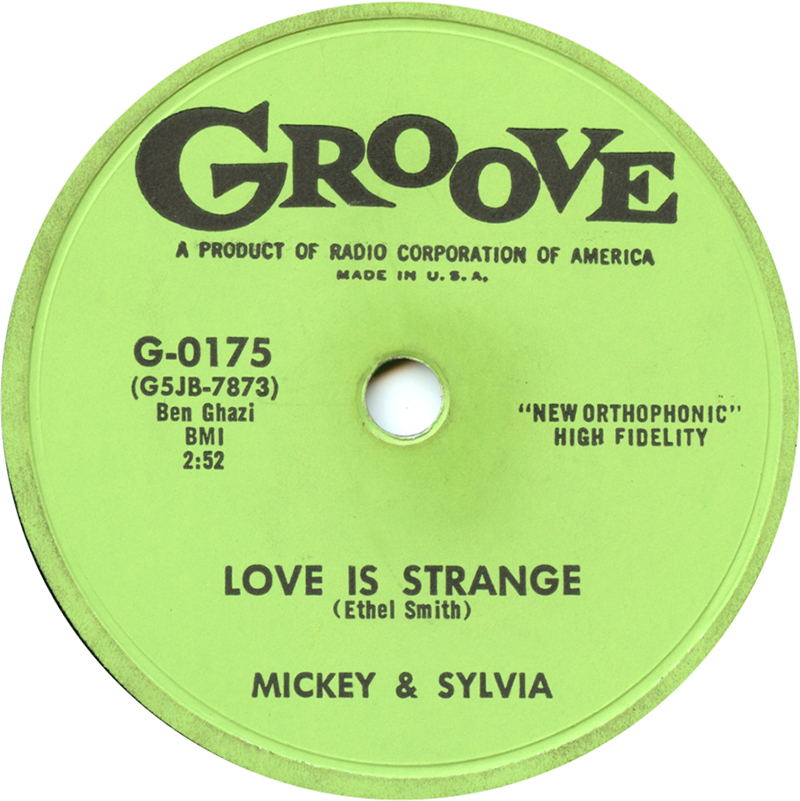

Single by Mickey & Sylvia
- B-side: "I'm Going Home"
- Released: November 1956
- Recorded: October 17, 1956
- Genre: Rock and roll; rhythm and blues
- Length: 2:52
- Label: Groove
- Songwriter: Bo Diddley (as Ethel Smith)
- Producer: Bob Rolontz

Mickey & Sylvia singles chronology
"No Good Lover" (1956)	"Love Is Strange" (1956)	"There Oughta Be a Law" (1957)

Audio
- "Love Is Strange" on YouTube

"Love Is Strange" is a crossover hit by American rhythm and blues duet Mickey & Sylvia, which was released in late November 1956 by the Groove record label.

The song was based on a guitar riff by Jody Williams and was written by Bo Diddley under the name of his wife at the time, Ethel Smith; it was recorded by Bo and Buddy Holly, among others.

== Background and recordings ==
At a concert at Howard Theatre in Washington, D.C. Mickey and Sylvia heard Jody Williams play a guitar riff that Williams had played on Billy Stewart's debut single "Billy's Blues". "Billy's Blues" was released as a single in June 1956. Sylvia Robinson claims that she and Mickey Baker wrote the lyrics, while Bo Diddley claims that he wrote them.

The first recorded version of "Love Is Strange" was performed by Bo Diddley, who recorded his version on May 24, 1956, with Jody Williams on lead guitar. This version was not released until its appearance on I'm a Man: The Chess Masters, 1955–1958 in 2007. Mickey & Sylvia's version was recorded several months later on October 17, 1956. A second Mickey & Sylvia studio recording, recorded some years after, featured now-legendary drummer Bernard "Pretty" Purdie on his first paid session gig.

== Charts and accolades ==
"Love Is Strange" peaked at number 1 on Billboard magazine's most played by jockeys R&B Singles chart on March 6, 1957, and number 11 on the Hot 100. In 2004, "Love Is Strange" was inducted into the Grammy Hall of Fame for its influence as a rock and roll single.

== Cover versions ==
=== Full covers and adaptations ===
Year	Artist	Chart(s) and peak	Notes
1957	Maddox Brothers and Rose	Billboard C&W (number 82) April 20, 1957	Columbia 4-40895-c 45 Single
1956	Lonnie Donegan	UK album (number 3)	Featured on The Golden Age of Donegan album. (Flipside of Cumberland Gap)
1962	Dale & Grace		Featured on Presenting Dale and Grace
1964	Betty Everett and Jerry Butler	US R'n'B (number 42)	Single A-side for Vee-Jay Records (backed with "Smile").
1964	Sonny & Cher	Bubbling Under Hot 100 Singles (number 31) and ARIA Charts (number 70)	Credited to "Salvatore Bono & Cher La Piere (aka Caesar & Cleo)"
1965	The Everly Brothers	UK chart (number 11)	This rendition was released on their Beat & Soul album
1967	Peaches & Herb	Billboard Hot 100 (number 13) and R&B Singles (number 16)	This version features the spoken dialogue and the repeated phrases, similar to the Mickey and Sylvia version.
1968	Nancy Sinatra and Lee Hazlewood	This version was recorded for the Nancy & Lee album, but subsequently left off the record. It was included on the Light In The Attic Records expanded reissue in 2022.	This version also includes two spoken word sections. Nancy is first, followed by Lee. When Nancy asks: "And if she still doesn't answer?" Lee replies: "You better get on in here or I'm gonna start without you!"
1969	Buddy Holly	Bubbling Under Hot 100 Singles (number 105) and RPM 100 (number 76)	Recorded in 1959, this version of "Love Is Strange", featuring multiple instrumental overdubs, was released on the posthumous album Giant in 1969, a decade after Holly's death.
1971	Wings		Featured on their debut album, Wild Life, and was planned to be released as a single.
1973	Exuma		on the Life album.
1975	Buck Owens and Susan Raye	Broke the Top 20 country chart.	
1990	Kenny Rogers and Dolly Parton	U.S. country singles chart (number 21); Australia ARIA Chart (number 145)	The cover was the title cut of Rogers' Love Is Strange album, and was also released as a single
1992	Everything But The Girl	UK chart (number 13)	Lead track on the Covers EP
1996	Lady Saw featuring Shaggy		Passion LP
2024	Joe Vitullo and Tammy Jo	Doo Rock album	Track 7 on this 15-track album featuring Michael Cohen on guitar.

=== Samplings ===
Part of the song was sampled for the 2012 Pitbull hit "Back in Time" from Men In Black 3.

== In popular culture ==
The song was featured in the 1987 film Dirty Dancing and included on the soundtrack, which is one of the best-selling albums of all time.

The spoken part is parodied by Eric Bloom and Buck Dharma of Blue Öyster Cult in a live recording of "7 Screaming Diz-Busters" on their 1975 album On Your Feet or on Your Knees:

Bloom: I know Lucifer so well I call him by his first name!
Dharma: What do you call him?
Bloom: I call him, hey Lu!
Dharma: And if he don't answer?
Bloom: I say, hey Lu... lover boy...

The song is parodied in the 1973 New York Dolls song "Trash", where singer David Johansen quotes "Oh how do you call your loverboy? ... Trash!" then later uses the same melody for several bars.

The song is "covered" by the fictional Scottish band "the Majestics" in the BBC Television series Tutti Frutti (1987), starring Emma Thompson, Robbie Coltrane, Maurice Roeves, Jake D'Arcy and Stuart McGugan.

The spoken part is referenced by Lou Reed at the end of his song "Beginning of A Great Adventure" on his 1989 album New York. He had married Sylvia Morales in 1980.

The song appears also in the 1993 TV miniseries Lipstick on Your Collar, where Mickey and Sylvia become the two main characters.

It also gained a following after appearing in Deep Throat (1972). The song was also played in the Terrence Malick film Badlands (1973) and in Martin Scorsese's 1995 film Casino when Robert De Niro sees Sharon Stone for the first time. The song also is played in the 2000 HBO series The Sopranos, season two, episode 6 ("The Happy Wanderer"). It can also be heard playing in the second episode of The Wire.
