= Crying, Waiting, Hoping =

1959 single by Buddy Holly

Single by Buddy Holly
- A-side: "Peggy Sue Got Married"
- Released: July 20, 1959 (US); August 28, 1959 (UK)
- Recorded: December 14, 1958 and June 30, 1959
- Genre: Rock and roll
- Length: 2:10
- Label: Coral
- Songwriter: Buddy Holly
- Producer: Jack Hansen

Buddy Holly singles chronology
"It Doesn't Matter Anymore" (1959)	"Crying, Waiting, Hoping" (1959)	"True Love Ways" (1960)

"Crying, Waiting, Hoping"
- 1978 bootleg single

Song by the Beatles

from the album Live at the BBC
- Released: November 30, 1994
- Recorded: July 16, 1963
- Length: 2:11
- Label: Apple
- Songwriter: Buddy Holly
- Producer: Terry Henebery

"Crying, Waiting, Hoping"

Song by Marshall Crenshaw

from the album La Bamba (soundtrack)
- Released: June 30, 1987
- Genre: Rock and roll
- Length: 2:20
- Label: Warner Bros.
- Songwriter: Buddy Holly
- Producer: Garry Tallent

"Crying, Waiting, Hoping" is a song written by Buddy Holly and released as a 45 single on Coral Records in 1959. It was released in 1959 as the B-side to "Peggy Sue Got Married". Three versions of Holly's recording were released: the 1959 commercial release, the 1964 reissue with different orchestration, and Holly's original, private home recording.

== Recordings ==
The song was first recorded on December 14, 1958 by Holly (by himself, with an acoustic guitar) in apartment 4H of "The Brevoort", Fifth Avenue, Manhattan (many other sources say apartment 3B). After Holly's death on February 3, 1959, his home recordings of his last six compositions were turned over to record producer Jack Hansen. Hansen hired studio musicians and a vocal backing group, the Ray Charles Singers, to augment Holly's vocal and guitar. The idea was to match the established sound of Buddy Holly and the Crickets as closely as possible.

"Crying, Waiting, Hoping" is technically the most successful of the six overdubs; it turned out so well that it was originally intended as the "A" side of a 45-rpm single. Holly wrote and recorded the song with pauses ("Cryin' ... waitin' ... hopin' ... you'll come back"). Hansen ingeniously turned the solo into call-and-response verses, so the backup singers fill in the pauses with an "echo" of each word. (For a German reissue of this song, the producer took the "echo" idea literally, and played the Hansen recording in an echo chamber.)

Hansen's studio version of "Crying, Waiting, Hoping" was recorded on June 30, 1959, at Coral Records' Studio A, along with "Peggy Sue Got Married". Both sides were released as Buddy Holly's first posthumous single. (The remaining four tunes on Holly's tape were re-recorded by Hansen and company in 1960. All six were issued on an album, The Buddy Holly Story, Vol. 2.)

Holly's manager, Norman Petty, recorded his own versions of the last six Holly originals in 1964, using his own studio facilities and backup group, The Fireballs. Petty's versions differ from Hansen's versions in that there are no backing vocals, and the melodies have new surf-guitar arrangements added to them.

== The Beatles versions ==
"Crying, Waiting, Hoping" was part of the Beatles' nightclub act during their formative years. It was a direct transcription of the 1959 Buddy Holly record. George Harrison sang the lead vocal and replicated studio guitarist Donald Arnone's instrumental bridge, note for note. The group performed the song during their failed Decca audition on January 1, 1962, with George Harrison on the lead vocal and Pete Best on drums.

The Beatles repeated the song on August 6, 1963, for the Pop Go the Beatles radio show. The BBC recording, which has been released commercially, features Ringo Starr on drums.

The Beatles never recorded the song during their heyday, but the group hadn't completely forgotten it. On January 29, 1969, between takes during a recording session, George Harrison began idly singing and playing "Crying, Waiting, Hoping." Paul McCartney and John Lennon jumped in immediately with their backing vocals, as they had in their early days, and Starr accompanied them. Harrison played the Donald Arnone bridge from memory.

== Marshall Crenshaw version ==
American musician Marshall Crenshaw released a version of "Crying, Waiting, Hoping" for the 1987 film La Bamba. Marshall Crenshaw portrayed Buddy Holly in the movie; he is featured singing the song on what is supposed to be February 2, 1959, Buddy's final show before dying in the plane crash in the early hours of February 3, "The Day the Music Died". Crenshaw has frequently been compared to Holly throughout his career.

Initially, Crenshaw was skeptical of accepting the role of Holly in the film, but was impressed by the script; he recalled, "I thought [the script] was fantastic, really. [I told producer Terry Hackford,] 'I'm still uneasy about this, but even if I don't do it, I hope it comes together for you.'"

Crenshaw's version of "Crying, Waiting, Hoping" was produced by Garry Tallent. It was Tallent's idea to record the song. Crenshaw explained,

"It was never actually recorded by Buddy Holly. It was a demo he was working on in his apartment before he was killed in the same plane crash that took the life of the film's subject, Ritchie Valens. It was Garry's idea to do the song. I figured, 'Okay, why not? I'll do it just to humor him.' It was his studio, after all."

== Sources ==
- Amburn, Ellis (1996). Buddy Holly: A Biography. St. Martin's Press. ISBN 978-0-312-14557-6.
- Bustard, Anne (2005). Buddy: The Story of Buddy Holly. Simon & Schuster. ISBN 978-1-4223-9302-4.
- Dawson, Jim; Leigh, Spencer (1996). Memories of Buddy Holly. Big Nickel Publications. ISBN 978-0-936433-20-2.
- Gerron, Peggy Sue (2008). Whatever Happened to Peggy Sue?. Togi Entertainment. ISBN 978-0-9800085-0-0.
- Goldrosen, John; Beecher, John (1996). Remembering Buddy: The Definitive Biography. New York: Da Capo Press. ISBN 0-306-80715-7.
- Goldrosen, John (1975). Buddy Holly: His Life and Music. Popular Press. ISBN 0-85947-018-0
- Gribbin, John (2009). Not Fade Away: The Life and Music of Buddy Holly. London: Icon Books. ISBN 978-1-84831-034-6
