= Sonny West (musician) =

American rockabilly musician, singer, and songwriter (1937–2022)

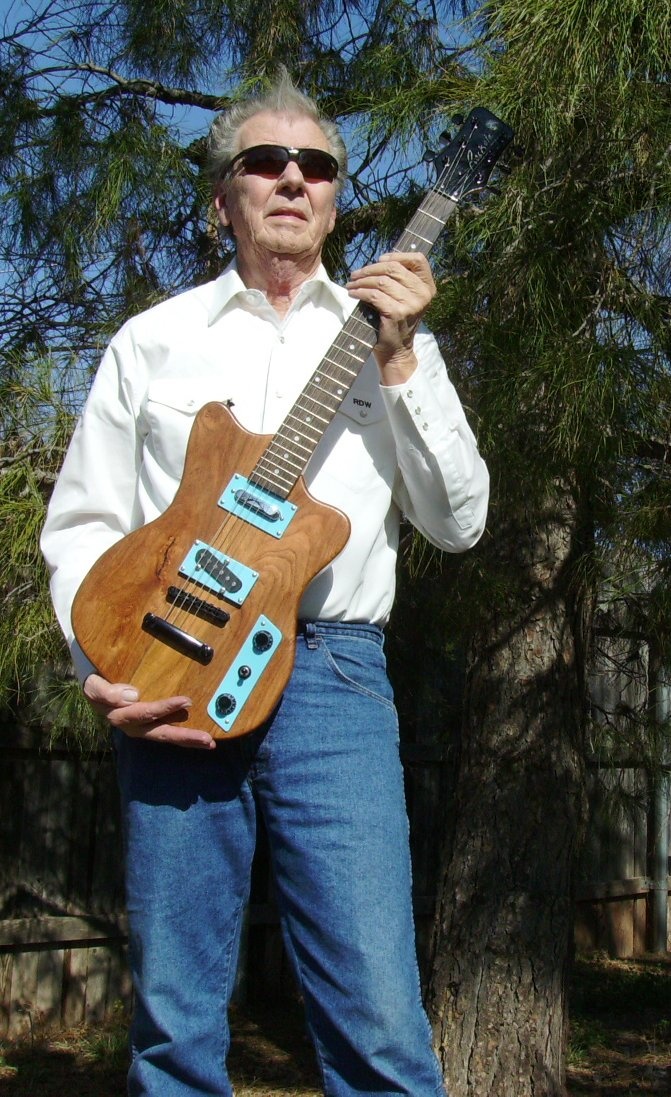
- West in 2010

Background information
- Born: Joseph Sonny West; July 30, 1937 near Lubbock, Texas, U.S.
- Died: September 8, 2022 (aged 85) Grove, Oklahoma, U.S.
- Genres: Rock and roll; rockabilly
- Occupations: Singer-songwriter, musician
- Instruments: Vocals, guitar
- Years active: 1956–1961, 2001–2022
- Labels: Nor-Va-Jak, Atlantic, Rollercoaster, Sleazy, Lance

Joseph Sonny West (July 30, 1937 – September 8, 2022) was an American songwriter and musician, best known as the co-writer of two of Buddy Holly's biggest hits: "Oh, Boy!" and "Rave On".

== Early life ==
Joseph Sonny West was born on July 30, 1937, near Lubbock, Texas, the fifth and youngest child of Joseph William, a sharecropper, and Alberta Grimes West. The family moved numerous times around Texas and New Mexico, ending up in Levelland, Texas.

== Music career ==
In 1956 West formed a band with Jimmy Metz (string bass), Doc McKay (drums) and Buddy Smith (guitar). They recorded "Rock-Ola Ruby" and "Sweet Rockin' Baby" at the local radio station KLVT in Levelland. Bob Kaliff, a disc jockey at KLVT, then arranged for West to re-record the two songs at Norman Petty's studio in Clovis, New Mexico. The studio, however, did not have an echo chamber at the time so Norman Petty arranged instead for the recording to occur at the local Lyceum Theatre, essentially a live recording on an AMPEX recorder, in August 1956. Only 700 copies of the songs were released on Petty's Nor-Va-Jak label. According to Tom Lincoln and Dick Blackburn's Guide to Rare Rockabilly and Rock and Roll 45 rpms: "Next to Elvis' Sun rockabilly pieces, this may be the next most sought after rockabilly record by collectors". At this time Petty changed the spelling of West's name from Sunny to Sonny. Smith quit the band shortly after the recording session and West took on the responsibility for all guitar playing.

In February 1957, West recorded a song, "All My Love", with McKay (drums), Metz (trumpet), and Glen Dee Hardin (piano). Only a few copies of this recording were made, which were sent to record companies to attract their interest in releasing the record commercially. One of the copies was heard by Buddy Holly, who with The Crickets recorded a version of the song at Petty's studios in Lubbock, as "Oh, Boy!" in July 1957. It was subsequently released in October and went on to reach number 10 on the US charts and number 3 on the UK charts in early 1958. The song was attributed to West, Petty, and Bill Tilghman, although according to West it was written by him alone, with Petty requiring his name to be added as part of the commercial contract with Holly. It was not until 2002 that West's version of "All My Love" was commercially released, when it was included on his debut solo album, Sweet Rockin' Rock-Ola Ruby.

At the end of 1957, Petty took over as West's manager and arranged a two-year recording contract with Atlantic Records, with a minimum of four releases. In December that year West recorded "Rave On", which was released on February 17, 1958, with the B-side, "Call on Cupid", on Atlantic Records, but achieved little commercial success. The song was inspired by a line from Carl Perkins' 1956 song "Dixie Fried".

On January 25, 1958, Holly recorded a version of "Rave On" at Bell Sound Studios in New York as a track for his debut solo album, Buddy Holly, with Coral Records releasing it as a solo single in April 1958. Although it barely made the top 40, peaking at No. 37 in the United States, it reached No. 5 in England.

In the spring of 1958, West recorded "Baby Bessie Lee", "Doll Britches" and "Linda Loves a Hula Hoop", backed by Sonny Curtis (guitar), Vi Petty (piano), George Atwood (bass) and McKay/Bo Clarke (drums) at Petty's Clovis Studios. Due to a dispute with Petty over including Petty as a writer in the recording contracts, the songs were never released. West then moved to Odessa, Texas.

In early 1959, Sonny flew to Phoenix, Arizona, where he recorded two songs, "Love Denied" and "Pretty Little Girl", with Al Casey on guitar. While neither song was released, "Love Denied" was later covered by Waylon Jennings, who also covered "Rave On". In 1961 West and Casey also recorded a version of Freddy Fender's "Wasted Days and Wasted Nights". West sent the tapes to Denver-based Bandbox Records, who had initially offered to finance re-recording the songs, but subsequently changed its mind. Bandbox did however release the demo recordings as a promotional single later that year.

In 2001, West played at a Lubbock fan Fair show, and the following spring recorded new tracks in his own studio. In 2002 West made his European appearance at the Hemsby Rock'n'Roll Weekender. He played at the Clovis Music Festival in 2005 which is now an annual event. In 2010 Spanish label Sleazy Records released a compilation album, Big City Woman (which included a vinyl reproduction of his first single, "Rock-Ola Ruby" / "Sweet Rockin' Baby"). West released the album Sweet Perfume in September 2011 on Lance Records, comprising his previously recorded songs and including two songs that he had planned to write for Holly back in 1958. His songs have been featured in films and television shows, including Quantum Leap, Happy Days, American Idol, So You Think You Can Dance, Cocktail, Pleasantville, and Glory Road.

== Personal life and death ==
In 1962, West married Emma “Debbie” Montoya (born 1938) and started a family. Two daughters, Diana West and Sandra Fay West, were born between 1962 and 1965. The marriage ended in divorce in 1978. A few years later Sonny met and married Dorothy "Dottie" Heikkila (1944–2018), a nurse, she had three children living at home at the time. They were married until her death in 2018. He was employed in the jukebox industry, starting his own company before moving to work for a larger company in Albuquerque.

West died in Grove, Oklahoma on September 8, 2022, at the age of 85.

== Awards and honors ==
West won a BMI songwriter 'Million-Air' achievement award in 2000 for "Oh, Boy!"; this award is given to a songwriter who has had a song play more than one million times on the radio. In 2011 Rolling Stone ranked "Rave On" as the number 154 greatest song of all time. On September 15, 2016, West was inducted into the West Texas Walk of Fame in Lubbock.

== Discography ==
- "Rock-Ola Ruby" / "Sweet Rockin' Baby" – Nor-Va-Jak (45WA1956) (November 1956) limited release – 700 copies
- "Rave On" / "Call On Cupid" – Atlantic (45-1174) (February 1958)
- "Wasted Days And Wasted Nights" / "Maybe You're The One" – Band Box (LB-2885) (1961) promotional release only
- Sweet Rockin' Rock-Ola Ruby – Rollercoaster (RCCD 3050) (September 3, 2002)
- Big City Woman – Sleazy (SR 19-SGCD) (2010) attributed to Sonny West and his Sweet Rockin' Band
- Sweet Perfume – Lance (L-2017) (September 27, 2011)
