= Rave On =

Single by Buddy Holly

from the album Buddy Holly
- B-side: "Take Your Time"
- Released: April 20, 1958; June 6, 1958 (UK)
- Recorded: January 25, 1958
- Studio: Bell Sound (New York City)
- Genre: Rock and roll
- Length: 1:47
- Label: Coral 9-61985; Coral Q 72325 (UK)
- Songwriter: West-Tilghman-Petty
- Producer: Milton DeLugg

Buddy Holly singles chronology
"I'm Gonna Love You Too" (1957)	"Rave On" (1958)	"Early in the Morning" (1958)

"Rave On", also written "Rave On!", is a 1958 rock song recorded and released by Buddy Holly on Coral Records. It was written by Sonny West, Bill Tilghman and Norman Petty in 1958.

It had first been recorded by West for Atlantic Records, which released his version in February 1958 (as Atlantic 45-1174). Buddy Holly recorded the song later the same year, and his version became a hit, one of six of his recordings that charted in 1958. Holly is instantly recognizable as the artist: the record begins with a drawn-out hiccupping "Well…" as stylized by Holly's distinctive hiccup ("A-weh-uh-heh-uh-ell…").

== Background ==
Most of West's recordings were produced and engineered by Norman Petty, who also managed Holly, and recorded in Petty's studio in Clovis, New Mexico. "Rave On", however, was produced by Milton DeLugg and recorded with Holly's group the Crickets at Bell Sound Studios in New York City. The title was inspired by the 1956 Sun Records recording "Dixie Fried" by Carl Perkins, which uses the refrain "rave on." The B-side was Holly's composition "Take Your Time".

Holly's rendition of "Rave On" is ranked number 155 on Rolling Stone magazine's 2004 list of "The 500 Greatest Songs of All Time."

== Chart performance ==
Holly's version reached number 12 in Canada, May 26, 1958., as well as number 5 in the UK.

== Track listing ==
=== Initial pressing ===
1. "Rave On"
2. "Take Your Time"

=== German pressing ===
As Buddy Holly and the Crickets

1. "Rave On"
2. "Ready Teddy"

=== EP (UK) ===
1. "Rave On"
2. "Take Your Time"
3. "Early in the Morning"
4. "Now We're One"

=== 1968 Re-release (UK) ===
1. "Rave On"
2. "Peggy Sue"

=== 1968 Re-release (US) ===
1. "Rave On"
2. "Early in the Morning"

== Other versions ==
Cover versions of "Rave On" have been recorded by Bruce Springsteen and the E Street Band, Commander Cody, Status Quo, M. Ward, and the folk-rock band Steeleye Span. It was a hit for the Delta Cross Band in Denmark in 1980.

Rick Nelson recorded the song and played it live many times. It was the final song Nelson ever performed, on December 30, 1985, the day before he too was killed in a plane crash.

Joe Meek produced a version with the singer Michael Cox, released in 1964 (backed with "Just Say Hello", HMV POP1293 A).

John Mellencamp recorded a version for the soundtrack of the film Cocktail in 1988.

The Real Kids recorded a cover version on their 1977 self-titled album.

Half Japanese recorded a cover version on their 1980 debut album 1/2 Gentlemen/Not Beasts.

Nitty Gritty Dirt Band recorded a cover version for their 1970 album Uncle Charlie & His Dog Teddy.

Steeleye Span recorded a version, in a mock-Buddy Holly vein, and released it as a non-album single in 1971.

In an interview, the Danish rock band the Raveonettes stated that their name is "a complete direct reference to the Ronettes and Buddy Holly Rave On."

M. Ward recorded a cover of the song for his 2009 album Hold Time.

Denny Laine, the guitarist for the bands Wings and Moody Blues, recorded a cover of the song for his 1977 Holly tribute album, Holly Days, produced by Paul McCartney.

Julian Casablancas recorded a cover of the song for the 2011 Holly tribute album Rave On Buddy Holly.

Cliff Richard recorded a cover of the song for his 2013 album, The Fabulous Rock 'n' Roll Songbook.

== Sources ==
- Amburn, Ellis (1996). Buddy Holly: A Biography. St. Martin's Press. ISBN 978-0-312-14557-6.
- Bustard, Anne (2005). Buddy: The Story of Buddy Holly. Simon & Schuster. ISBN 978-1-4223-9302-4.
- Dawson, Jim; Leigh, Spencer (1996). Memories of Buddy Holly. Big Nickel Publications. ISBN 978-0-936433-20-2.
- Gerron, Peggy Sue (2008). Whatever Happened to Peggy Sue? Togi Entertainment. ISBN 978-0-9800085-0-0.
- Goldrosen, John (1975). Buddy Holly: His Life and Music. Popular Press. ISBN 0-85947-018-0.
- Goldrosen, John; Beecher, John (1996). Remembering Buddy: The Definitive Biography. New York: Da Capo Press. ISBN 0-306-80715-7.
- Gribbin, John (2009). Not Fade Away: The Life and Music of Buddy Holly. London: Icon Books. ISBN 978-1-84831-034-6
