= Everyday (Buddy Holly song) =

1957 single by Buddy Holly

- "Everyday" single label

Single by Buddy Holly

from the album Buddy Holly
- A-side: "Peggy Sue"
- Released: September 20, 1957
- Recorded: May 29, 1957
- Studio: Norman Petty Recording Studios (Clovis, New Mexico)
- Genre: Pop
- Length: 2:09
- Label: Coral
- Songwriters: Buddy Holly, Norman Petty
- Producers: Norman Petty, Bob Thiele

Audio video
- "Everyday" on YouTube

"Everyday"

Single by John Denver

from the album Aerie
- B-side: "City of New Orleans"
- Released: February 18, 1972
- Recorded: June 15, 1971
- Length: 3:15
- Label: RCA
- Songwriters: Buddy Holly, Norman Petty
- Producer: Milton Okun

John Denver singles chronology
"Friends with You" (1971)	"Everyday" (1972)	"Goodbye Again" (1972)

"Everyday" is a song written by Buddy Holly and Norman Petty, recorded by Buddy Holly and the Crickets on May 29, 1957, and released on September 20, 1957, as the B-side of "Peggy Sue". The A side "Peggy Sue" went to number three on the Billboard Hot 100 chart in 1957. "Everyday" is ranked number 238 on Rolling Stone magazine's list of the "500 Greatest Songs of All Time".

The song was recorded at Norman Petty Recording Studios in Clovis, New Mexico. On the original single, the Crickets are not credited, but it is known that Holly plays acoustic guitar, drummer Jerry Allison slaps his knees for percussion, and Joe B. Mauldin plays a standup acoustic bass. Vi Petty, Norman Petty's wife—played the celesta on the recording.

"Everyday"

Single by James Taylor

from the album That's Why I'm Here
- B-side: "Limousine Driver"
- Released: October 1985
- Genre: Rock, soft rock
- Label: Columbia
- Songwriters: Buddy Holly, Norman Petty
- Producers: Peter Asher; Frank Filipetti; James Taylor

James Taylor singles chronology
"Hard Times" (1981)	"Everyday" (1985)	"Only One" (1986)

== Recording and production ==
"Everyday" was recorded on May 29, 1957, at the Norman Petty Recording Studios in Clovis, New Mexico. The session marked a notable stylistic shift for Buddy Holly, moving away from his energetic rockabilly roots toward a softer, more experimental pop sound. Although members of Holly's band, The Crickets, performed on the track, they were not credited on the original single's label due to contractual and legal complications.

The recording is renowned for its innovative and minimalist instrumentation, which contributed to the signature "Clovis Sound". The distinctive, bell-like melody was played on a celesta by Vi Petty, the wife of producer Norman Petty. In a departure from standard recording practices, drummer Jerry Allison did not use a drum kit; instead, he provided the song's rhythmic foundation by slapping his hands against his knees throughout the take. To achieve a more intimate and muffled vocal texture, legend suggests that Holly’s vocals were recorded through a cardboard tube, a technique reflecting Norman Petty's creative engineering and use of echo chamber effects.

== Composition and lyrics ==
Thematically, "Everyday" is a romantic song that expresses optimism, with the speaker filled with hopeful anticipation of finding true love. The lyrics describe a sense of gradual progression towards his beloved, noting that each passing day brings him closer to his goal ("Everyday, it's a gettin' closer"). The innocent and dreamy atmosphere of the lyrics is reflected in the unique musical arrangement produced at Norman Petty Studios. The instrumental accompaniment—featuring the celesta (a keyboard instrument with a bell-like sound) and rhythmic slapping on knees as percussion instead of a standard drum kit—gives the song an intimate, lullaby-like quality. Biographer Philip Norman noted that the song represents Buddy Holly's transition from the grittier rock and roll style of his early career toward a softer, "cleaner" pop-rock sound that emphasizes youthful innocence.

== Personnel ==
The Crickets

- Buddy Holly – vocals, guitar
- Joe B. Mauldin – bass
- Jerry Allison – knee slaps

Additional personnel

- Vi Petty – celesta

Technical

- Norman Petty – producer
- Bob Thiele – producer

== Cover versions ==
1957 sheet music cover, Southern Music Publishing, New York

John Denver recorded the song for his 1971 album Aerie and released it as a single, which peaked at number 81 on the Billboard Hot 100 chart and number 21 on the Billboard Adult Contemporary chart in 1972. Upon its release, Record World said it was the best of several recent covers of the song.

Don McLean recorded this song for his 1973 album Playin' Favorites and released it as a single, which peaked at number 38 in the UK.

A version recorded by James Taylor was released in 1985, rising to number 3 on the Billboard Adult Contemporary chart in the US, number 61 on the Billboard Hot 100 chart and number 26 on the Billboard Hot Country Songs chart. It also reached number 1 on the Canadian Adult Contemporary chart. The song is included on his 1985 album "That's Why I'm Here". Cashbox called Taylor's version "a perfect showcase for Taylor’s mellow-rocking delivery" with "nice melodic changes and a touching sentiment." Billboard said it has "the wit and style he applied to 'Handy Man.'"

== Certifications ==
Certifications for "Everyday"
Region	Certification	Certified units/sales
United Kingdom (BPI)	Silver	200,000^{‡}
^{‡} Sales+streaming figures based on certification alone.

== In popular culture ==
The song is used as the opening song for Ryan Reynolds' and Rob McElhenney's docuseries Welcome to Wrexham from episode 3 onwards.

The song is featured prominently in the 2009 film Mr. Nobody starring Jared Leto and Diane Kruger.

The song is featured in the 2025 film Song Sung Blue starring Hugh Jackman and Kate Hudson.
