= Raining in My Heart =

1959 single by Buddy Holly

Song by Buddy Holly

from the album The Buddy Holly Story
- Released: January 5, 1959
- Recorded: October 21, 1958
- Studio: Decca (New York City)
- Genre: Pop
- Length: 2:48
- Label: Coral 9-62074
- Songwriter: Felice Bryant, Boudleaux Bryant

"Raining in My Heart" is a song recorded by Buddy Holly on October 21, 1958 at Decca's recording studio in the Pythian Temple on West 70th Street in New York City, with the orchestral backing by Dick Jacobs. It was released as a single on Coral Records. The music and lyrics were written by the songwriting team of Felice and Boudleaux Bryant.

== Release ==
It was released as a single on Coral Records on January 5, 1959, peaking at number 88 on the Billboard chart as the B-side of "It Doesn't Matter Anymore". This recording was included on Buddy Holly's first "greatest hits" compilation album, The Buddy Holly Story, that was released in March 1959.

== Leo Sayer cover ==
"Raining in My Heart"

Single by Leo Sayer

from the album Leo Sayer
- B-side: "No Looking Back"
- Released: September 1978 (U.S.)
- Genre: Pop, Easy Listening
- Length: 3:16
- Label: Warner
- Producer: Richard Perry

Leo Sayer singles chronology
"I Can't Stop Loving You (Though I Try)" (1978)	"Raining in My Heart" (1978)	"When the Money Runs Out" (1979)

"Raining in My Heart" was also a 1978 hit for Leo Sayer when his recording of the song peaked at number 21 on the UK Singles Chart and number 47 on the US Billboard Hot 100. It also reached number 9 on the U.S. Easy Listening chart.

=== Chart history ===
Chart (1978)	Peak position
Australia (Kent Music Report)	93
Canada RPM Adult Contemporary	10
Ireland (IRMA)	26
UK Singles (OCC)	21
US Billboard Hot 100	47
US Billboard Adult Contemporary	9
US Hot Country Songs (Billboard)	63
US Cash Box Top 100	43

== Other cover versions ==
- Kitty Kallen – for her album Honky Tonk Angel, Country Songs with a City Flavor (1961).
- Bobby Vee – for his album Take Good Care of My Baby (1962).
- Johnnie Ray – included in the 5-CD Bear Family Records set Yes Tonight Josephine.
- Patti Page – included in the compilation album From Nashville to L.A.: Lost Columbia Masters 1962–1969 (2013).
- Skeeter Davis released her tribute album Skeeter Davis Sings Buddy Holly (1967) featuring the song.
- Dean Martin – For the Good Times (1971).
- The Dave Clark Five covered this song on their 1971 album, The Dave Clark Five Play Good Old Rock & Roll.
- Anne Murray did a cover of the song on her album New Kind of Feeling (1979).
- Peter Skellern – Still Magic (1980).
- Connie Francis released her tribute album With Love to Buddy featuring the song in 1996.
- Status Quo on their album Don't Stop in 1996.
- In 1996, Hank Marvin did an instrumental of the song on Hank Plays Holly.
- Australian blues and root band The Revelators covered the song on their 2000 album, The Adventures of The Amazing Revelators.
- Don McLean on his live double album Starry Starry Night in 2001.
- Robert Wyatt included a piano based instrumental version on his 2003 album, Cuckooland.
- Eric Idle contributed a Spike Jones-esque cover of "Raining in My Heart" for the tribute album, Listen to Me: Buddy Holly released in September 2011.

== In popular culture ==
- In 1968, The Beatles paraphrased the first line of "Raining in My Heart" in their song "Dear Prudence" as "The sun is up [instead of "out"]; the sky is blue."
- The Beatles 1963 song "Please Please Me" contains the line "there's always rain in my heart" in the bridge.
- Rick Danko covered the song on his 1989 tour as a member of Ringo Starr & His All-Starr Band; he performed it live throughout his solo career.
- This song is referenced in Alvin Stardust's song "I Feel Like Buddy Holly." That song's refrain is: "Well, I feel like Buddy Holly, 'cause it's raining in my heart."
