= Oh, Boy! (The Crickets song) =

1957 song by The Crickets

Single by the Crickets

from the album The "Chirping" Crickets
- B-side: "Not Fade Away"
- Released: October 27, 1957; December 22, 1957 (UK)
- Recorded: July 29 – August 1, 1957
- Studio: Norman Petty Recording Studios (Clovis, New Mexico)
- Genre: Rock and roll; rockabilly
- Length: 2:10
- Label: Brunswick 9-55035
- Songwriters: Sonny West, Bill Tilghman, Norman Petty
- Producer: Norman Petty

The Crickets singles chronology
"That'll Be the Day" (1957)	"Oh, Boy!" (1957)	"Maybe Baby" (1958)

"Oh, Boy!" is a song recorded and released by The Crickets in 1957. The song was included on the album The "Chirping" Crickets and was also released as the A-side of a single, with "Not Fade Away" as the B-side. The song peaked at number 10 on the US charts, number 3 on the UK charts in early 1958, and number 6 in Canada. (See 1958 in music for more context.) It was written by Sonny West, Bill Tilghman and Norman Petty.

== Background ==
The song was originally recorded as a demo by Sonny West as "All My Love (Oh Boy!)" at Norman Petty Recording Studios in Clovis, New Mexico in early 1957. Petty presented West's demo to Buddy Holly with the intention of Holly recording the song. On the BBC's Classic Albums series in 2019, West said, "I had a decision to make whether to say I want to do it myself and I said 'No, I want Buddy to do it', it can't hurt anything and if it didn't work I could go back and do it myself someday." It was subsequently recorded by Holly's group The Crickets between June 29 and July 1, 1957, at Norman Petty Studios with Holly singing lead vocals and The Picks providing backing vocals. The song is in an A-A-B-A format with a 12-bar blues verse and an 8-bar bridge. (Holly also covered another West song, "Rave On".)

=== Lyrics change ===
West has stated that Holly made a small change to the original lyrics of the song. He told the BBC's Classic Albums series in 2019, "I said 'All my love, all my kissing, you're gonna see what you've been missing'. And with Buddy's verse, 'All my love, all my kissing, you don't know what you've been missing'. I have no idea, maybe it has more punch that way."

== Covers ==
"Oh Boy!" was covered by British glam rock group Mud. It reached number 1 for two weeks on the UK Singles Chart in May 1975. It was the band's third and final UK number one. It was included on their album Mud Rock Vol. II, which reached number 6 in the UK Albums Chart. Other versions include:

- Bobby Vee recorded the song in 1963.
- Jackie DeShannon released a version of the song on her album Breakin' It Up on the Beatles Tour! (1964).
- The song was "revived" in an offbeat power ballad version by Starbabies, which reached the Billboard Adult Contemporary chart in 1979.
- Los Lobos recorded the song for the film La Bamba in 1987.

== Sources ==
- Amburn, Ellis (1996). Buddy Holly: A Biography. St. Martin's Press. ISBN 978-0-312-14557-6.
- Bustard, Anne (2005). Buddy: The Story of Buddy Holly. Simon & Schuster. ISBN 978-1-4223-9302-4.
- Dawson, Jim; Leigh, Spencer (1996). Memories of Buddy Holly. Big Nickel Publications. ISBN 978-0-936433-20-2.
- Gerron, Peggy Sue (2008). Whatever Happened to Peggy Sue? Togi Entertainment. ISBN 978-0-9800085-0-0.
- Goldrosen, John (1975). Buddy Holly: His Life and Music. Popular Press. ISBN 0-85947-018-0
- Goldrosen, John; Beecher, John (1996). Remembering Buddy: The Definitive Biography. New York: Da Capo Press. ISBN 0-306-80715-7.
- Gribbin, John (2009). Not Fade Away: The Life and Music of Buddy Holly. London: Icon Books. ISBN 978-1-84831-034-6
