= Maybe Baby (song) =

Single by the Crickets

from the album The "Chirping" Crickets
- B-side: "Tell Me How"
- Released: 1958
- Recorded: September 29, 1957
- Venue: Tinker Air Force Base Officers' Club (Oklahoma City, Oklahoma)
- Genre: Rock and roll
- Length: 2:01
- Label: Brunswick 9-55053
- Songwriters: Buddy Holly and Norman Petty
- Producer: Norman Petty

The Crickets singles chronology
"Oh, Boy!" (1957)	"Maybe Baby" (1958)	"Think It Over" (1958)

"Maybe Baby" is a rock-and-roll song written by Buddy Holly and the producer Norman Petty, and recorded by Holly and the Crickets in 1957. The single, released in January 1958 and credited to the Crickets, was a Top 40 hit in the U.S., the UK, and Canada.

The song appeared in the 1973 George Lucas film American Graffiti and was on the MCA Records soundtrack album 41 Original Hits from the Soundtrack of American Graffiti, which was certified triple Platinum by the RIAA and which peaked at number 10 on the Billboard 200 album chart.

The song was performed by Paul McCartney in the 2000 British comedy film Maybe Baby.

== Background ==
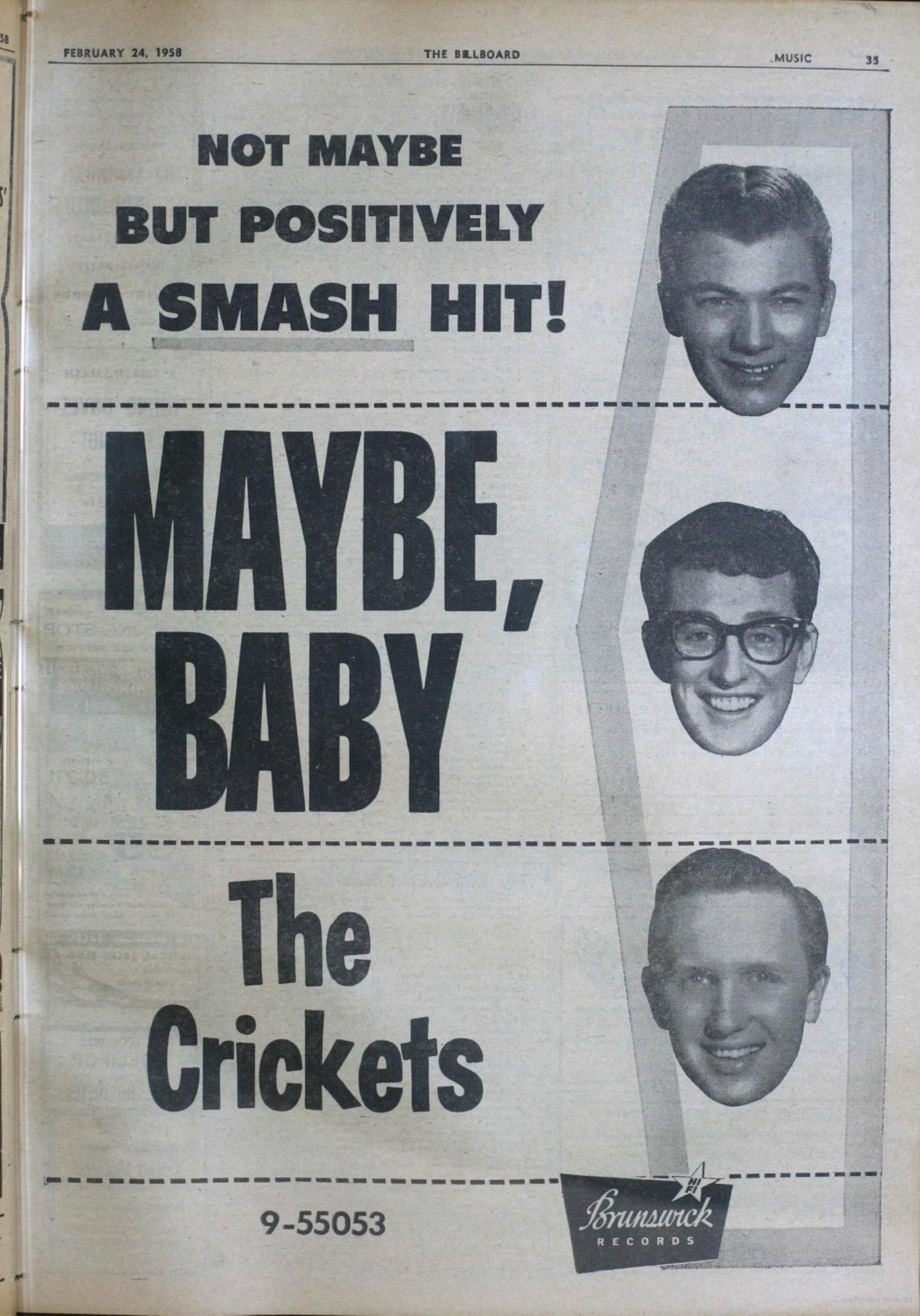
Billboard advertisement, February 24, 1958

1957 sheet music cover, Nor Va Jak Music, New York

"Maybe Baby", originally recorded by Holly and the Crickets in 1957, reached number 17 on the US charts and number 4 on the UK chart; Holly toured in the UK that year (see Buddy Holly discography). The single also reached number 8 on the Billboard R&B chart and number 9 on the Canadian charts. The rather simple lyrics are augmented by a twangy percussive accompaniment, characteristic of rockabilly, which is especially effective in the 8-bar instrumental introduction and the short conclusion.

"Maybe Baby" was recorded at the Tinker Air Force Base Officers' Club in Oklahoma City, Oklahoma, on September 29, 1957, while Buddy Holly and the Crickets were on a tour. Drummer Jerry Allison remembers that the song, along with three others, was recorded at Tinker Air Force Base. Graham Pugh, a Buddy Holly researcher from the Oklahoma City area, also has seen airplane tickets documenting the fact that Buddy Holly and the Crickets landed at Will Rogers World Airport in Oklahoma City on September 28, 1957.

== Personnel ==
- Buddy Holly – lead vocals, lead guitar
- Jerry Allison – drums
- Joe B. Mauldin – contrabass
- Niki Sullivan – rhythm guitar

== Other recordings ==
The song has been recorded by Paul McCartney in a version co-produced by Jeff Lynne as the title track of the 2000 British comedy film Maybe Baby.

Gary Busey performed the song in the 1978 biopic The Buddy Holly Story.

== Sources ==
- Amburn, Ellis (1996). Buddy Holly: A Biography. St. Martin's Press. ISBN 978-0-312-14557-6.
- Bustard, Anne (2005). Buddy: The Story of Buddy Holly. Simon & Schuster. ISBN 978-1-4223-9302-4.
- Dawson, Jim; Leigh, Spencer (1996). Memories of Buddy Holly. Big Nickel Publications. ISBN 978-0-936433-20-2.
- Goldrosen, John; Beecher, John (1996). Remembering Buddy: The Definitive Biography. New York: Da Capo Press. ISBN 0-306-80715-7.
- Goldrosen, John (1975). Buddy Holly: His Life and Music. Popular Press. ISBN 0-85947-018-0
