= Peggy Sue =

Single by Buddy Holly

from the album Buddy Holly
- B-side: "Everyday"
- Released: September 20, 1957
- Recorded: June 29 and July 1, 1957
- Studio: Norman Petty Recording Studios (Clovis, New Mexico)
- Genre: Rock and roll; rockabilly
- Length: 2:29
- Label: Coral 9-61885
- Songwriters: Jerry Allison, Norman Petty, Buddy Holly
- Producer: Norman Petty

Buddy Holly singles chronology
"That'll Be the Day" (1957)	"Peggy Sue" (1957)	"Love Me" (1958)

"Peggy Sue" is a rock and roll song written by Jerry Allison, Norman Petty and Buddy Holly. The song was recorded and released as a single by Buddy Holly on September 20, 1957. The Crickets are not mentioned on label of the single (Coral 9-61885), but band members Joe B. Mauldin (string bass), Niki Sullivan (rhythm guitar) and Jerry Allison (drums) played on the recording. This recording was also released on Holly's eponymous 1958 album.

Initially, only Allison and Petty were listed as the song's authors. At Allison's insistence, Holly was credited as a co-writer after his death. The song was named for, and inspired by, Holly's niece Cindy Lou.

According to Paul McCartney, The Beatles played "Peggy Sue" repetitively inspiring them to write one of their early songs "Love Me Do". The Beatles named their band on a word play from "The Crickets".

== Production ==
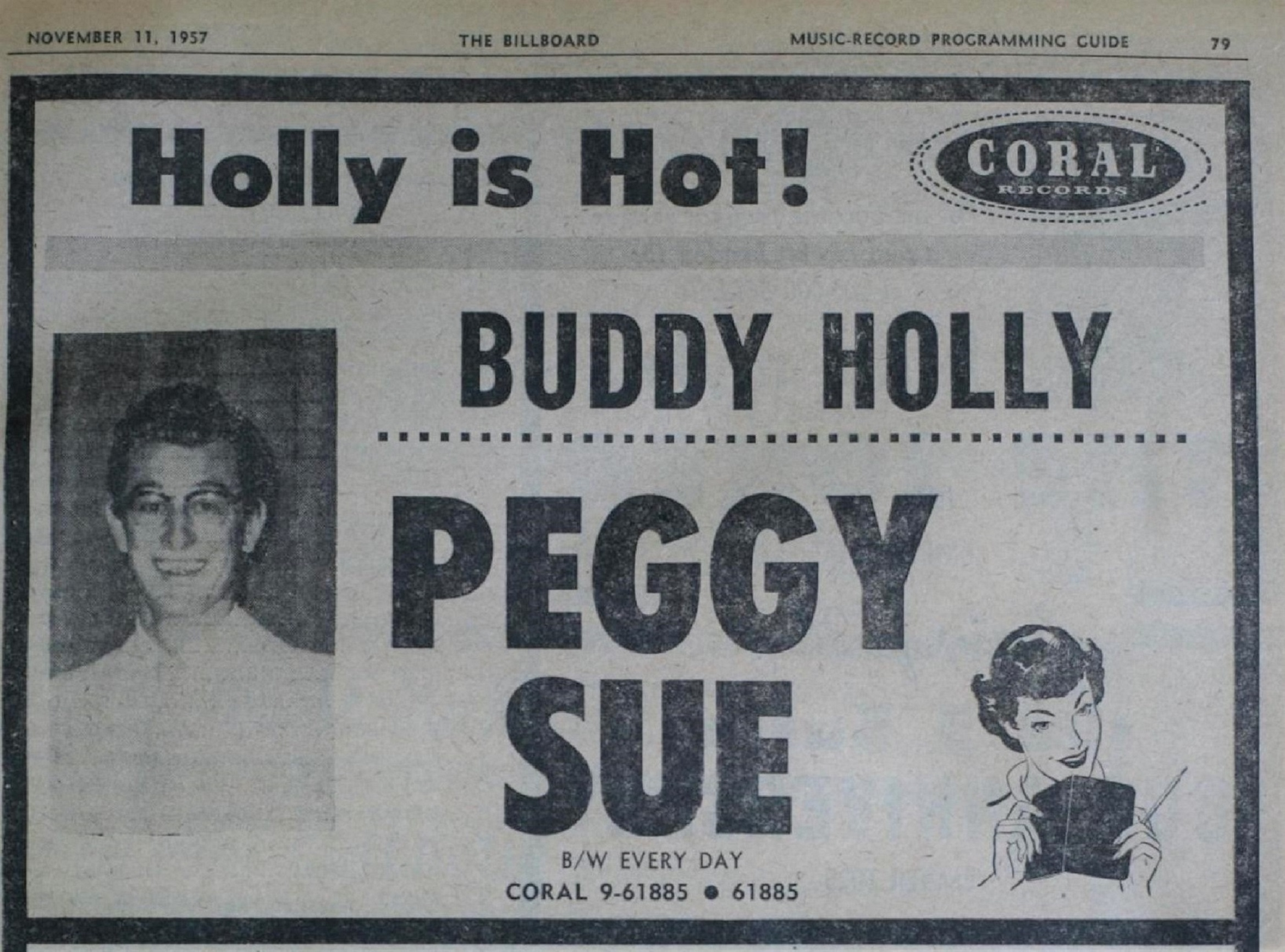
Billboard advertisement, November 11, 1957

The song was originally entitled "Cindy Lou", after Holly's niece, the daughter of his sister Pat Holley Kaiter. The title was later changed to "Peggy Sue" in reference to Peggy Sue Gerron (1940–2018), the girlfriend (and future wife) of Jerry Allison, the drummer for the Crickets, after the couple had temporarily broken up.

In her memoir, Whatever Happened to Peggy Sue?, Gerron stated that she first heard the song at a live performance at the Sacramento Memorial Auditorium in 1957, and that she was "so embarrassed, I could have died."

Appropriately, Allison had a prominent role in the production of the song, playing paradiddles on the drums throughout the song, the drums' sound rhythmically fading in and out as a result of real-time engineering techniques by the producer, Norman Petty at his recording studio in Clovis, New Mexico. Joe B. Mauldin (string bass) also played on the recording.

== Reception ==
"Peggy Sue" went to number three on the Billboard Top 100 chart in 1957.

It is ranked number 194 on Rolling Stone magazine's 2004 list of the "500 Greatest Songs of All Time". In 1999, National Public Radio (NPR) included the song on the NPR 100, a list of the "100 Most Important American Musical Works of the 20th Century". The song was inducted into the Grammy Hall of Fame in 1999. The Rock and Roll Hall of Fame and Museum included the song on its list of the "Songs That Shaped Rock and Roll".

== "Peggy Sue Got Married" ==
Holly wrote a sequel, "Peggy Sue Got Married", and recorded a demonstration version in his New York City apartment on December 5, 1958, accompanied only by himself on guitar. The tape was discovered after his death and was "enhanced" for commercial release, with the addition of backing vocals and an electric guitar track that drowns out Holly's playing and almost drowns out his voice. The rarely heard original version was released on a vinyl collection, The Complete Buddy Holly. It was later played over the opening credits of the 1986 Kathleen Turner film Peggy Sue Got Married.

After Holly's death, the Crickets released their own version as a single in 1960. They followed the original arrangements, with David Box, a Holly soundalike, as the lead vocalist.

"Peggy Sue Got Married" chronicled Peggy Sue Gerron's marriage to Jerry Allison which took place in 1958, the year the song as written; the couple eventually divorced in later years.

== Cover versions ==
This song has been covered many times, including by John Lennon, New Riders of the Purple Sage, The Beach Boys, The Hollies, and Waylon Jennings (who worked with Holly).

An adaptation of "Peggy Sue" entitled "Christmas Time Is Here Again" which made use of the backing track from The Beach Boys' cover version featured on their 1998 compilation album Ultimate Christmas.

== Chart performance ==
=== Single ===
Chart (1957)	Peak position
Canada CHUM Chart	4
UK Charts	6
US Billboard	3
Chart (1958)	Peak position
Belgium Charts	9
Dutch Charts	5

== Sources ==
- Amburn, Ellis (1995). Buddy Holly: A Biography. St. Martin's Press. ISBN 0-312-14557-8.
- Cott, Jonathan (1976). In The Rolling Stone Illustrated History of Rock and Roll. Rolling Stone Press, Random House. ISBN 0-394-73238-3.
- Bustard, Anne (2005). Buddy: The Story of Buddy Holly. Simon & Schuster. ISBN 978-1-4223-9302-4.
- Dawson, Jim; Leigh, Spencer (1996). Memories of Buddy Holly. Big Nickel Publications. ISBN 978-0-936433-20-2.
- Goldrosen, John; Beecher, John (1996). Remembering Buddy: The Definitive Biography. New York: Da Capo Press. ISBN 0-306-80715-7.
- Goldrosen, John (1975). Buddy Holly: His Life and Music. Popular Press. ISBN 0-85947-018-0
- Laing, Dave (1971–2010). Buddy Holly. Icons of Pop Music. Bloomington, IN: Indiana University Press. ISBN 0-253-22168-4. OCLC 611172616.
- Mann, Alan (1996). The A-Z of Buddy Holly. Aurum Press (2nd edition). ISBN 1-85410-433-0 or 978–1854104335.
- Norman, Phillip (1996) Rave On: The Biography of Buddy Holly. Simon & Schuster Publishing. ISBN 0684800829.
- Peer, Elizabeth and Ralph II (1972). Buddy Holly: A Biography in Words, Photographs and Music Australia: Peer International. ASIN B000W24DZO.
- Peters, Richard (1990). The Legend That Is Buddy Holly. Barnes & Noble Books. ISBN 0-285-63005-9 or 978–0285630055.
- Rabin, Stanton (2009). OH BOY! The Life and Music of Rock 'n' Roll Pioneer Buddy Holly. Van Winkle Publishing (Kindle). ASIN B0010QBLLG.
- Tobler, John (1979). The Buddy Holly Story. Beaufort Books.
