= Niki Sullivan =

American guitarist (1937–2004)

Background information
- Born: June 23, 1937; South Gate, California, U.S.
- Died: April 6, 2004 (aged 66) Sugar Creek, Missouri, U.S.
- Genres: Rock and roll, Rockabilly
- Occupation: Guitarist
- Years active: 1956–1969
- Formerly of: The Crickets

Niki Sullivan (June 23, 1937 – April 6, 2004) was an American rock and roll guitarist, born in South Gate, California. He was one of the three original members of Buddy Holly's backing band, the Crickets. Though he lost interest within a few months of his involvement, his guitar playing was an integral part of Holly's early success. He performed on 27 of the 32 songs Holly and The Crickets recorded over his brief career. He co-wrote a number of his own songs. In 2012, Sullivan was inducted into the Rock and Roll Hall of Fame as a member of the Crickets by a special committee, aimed at correcting the mistake of not including the Crickets with Buddy Holly when he was first inducted in 1986.

== Becoming a Cricket ==
Born to Matt and Kathy Sullivan, Niki briefly served in the United States Navy. During the summer of 1956, the 19-year-old Sullivan first met Holly, by way of his high school friend Jerry Allison, at a jam session in Lubbock, Texas. Holly was impressed by his guitar-playing talents and offered him the chance to join both of them, as well as Joe B. Mauldin, in a band. Sullivan readily accepted the offer, and thus the Crickets were born.

While trying to record "Peggy Sue" after many unsatisfactory takes, Sullivan ended up kneeling next to Buddy while he played, and when cued flipped a switch on Holly's Stratocaster, allowing him to break into the now-famous guitar solo. He also helped sing on back up and arrange the music to "Not Fade Away" (which he helped write), "I'm Gonna Love You Too", "That'll Be the Day" and "Maybe Baby". It was around this period that he also wrote and produced the single "Look to the Future," which was recorded by Gary Tollett and the Picks, who often did back-up vocals for the Crickets.

Since he had a slight resemblance to Holly in his skinny posture and spectacles, he was often called "the other guy in glasses" by critics in their reviews. He and Holly were related, being third cousins through marriage, but it is not known if they were aware of this relationship at the time Holly was alive. After their December 1, 1957, appearance on The Ed Sullivan Show, the group briefly went on hiatus to plan their next recordings. Later that month, Sullivan formally announced that he had left the band for good. He later stated that this was due to the intensive touring schedule, which he saw as "no way to live".

== Life after Holly ==
Following his departure from the Crickets, Sullivan recorded the single "It's All Over", released by Dot Records in 1958. Later, he became a member of the group the Hollyhawks, recording a number of songs with former Holly producer Norman Petty. During the 1960s, Sullivan returned to Los Angeles, where he performed with the group Soul Incorporated.

Sullivan eventually retired from the recording business altogether and took a job at Sony. Later, he married in 1967, which he considered the most rewarding experience of his life. In 1978, he reunited with Allison, Mauldin, and new lead singer Sonny Curtis for a one-night performance at a Buddy Holly Festival. Over the years, he gave numerous interviews about his life with the Crickets and played at the Surf Ballroom in Clear Lake, Iowa, where Holly had given his last concert.

For the 1978 movie The Buddy Holly Story, starring Gary Busey, his character was left out of the story line along with Sonny Curtis, Bob Montgomery, Don Guess and Larry Welborn. This, to many fans, made the movie a mockery of his life. There have been several documentaries with his bandmates (one featuring Paul McCartney), which have been titled the "real" Buddy Holly story and have made an attempt to tell the true story of his life. In the stage show Buddy: The Buddy Holly Story, the character of Niki Sullivan plays a prominent role. This role was played by Andy Umscheid in the Klingenberg am Main festival's production of the show.

== Death ==
Sullivan died of a heart attack, aged 66, on April 6, 2004, at his home in Sugar Creek, Missouri. He was survived by his wife Fran E. Sullivan (died April 1, 2012), his two sons, a granddaughter and a sister.
