= Norman Petty Recording Studios =

Music recording studio museum in Clovis, New Mexico

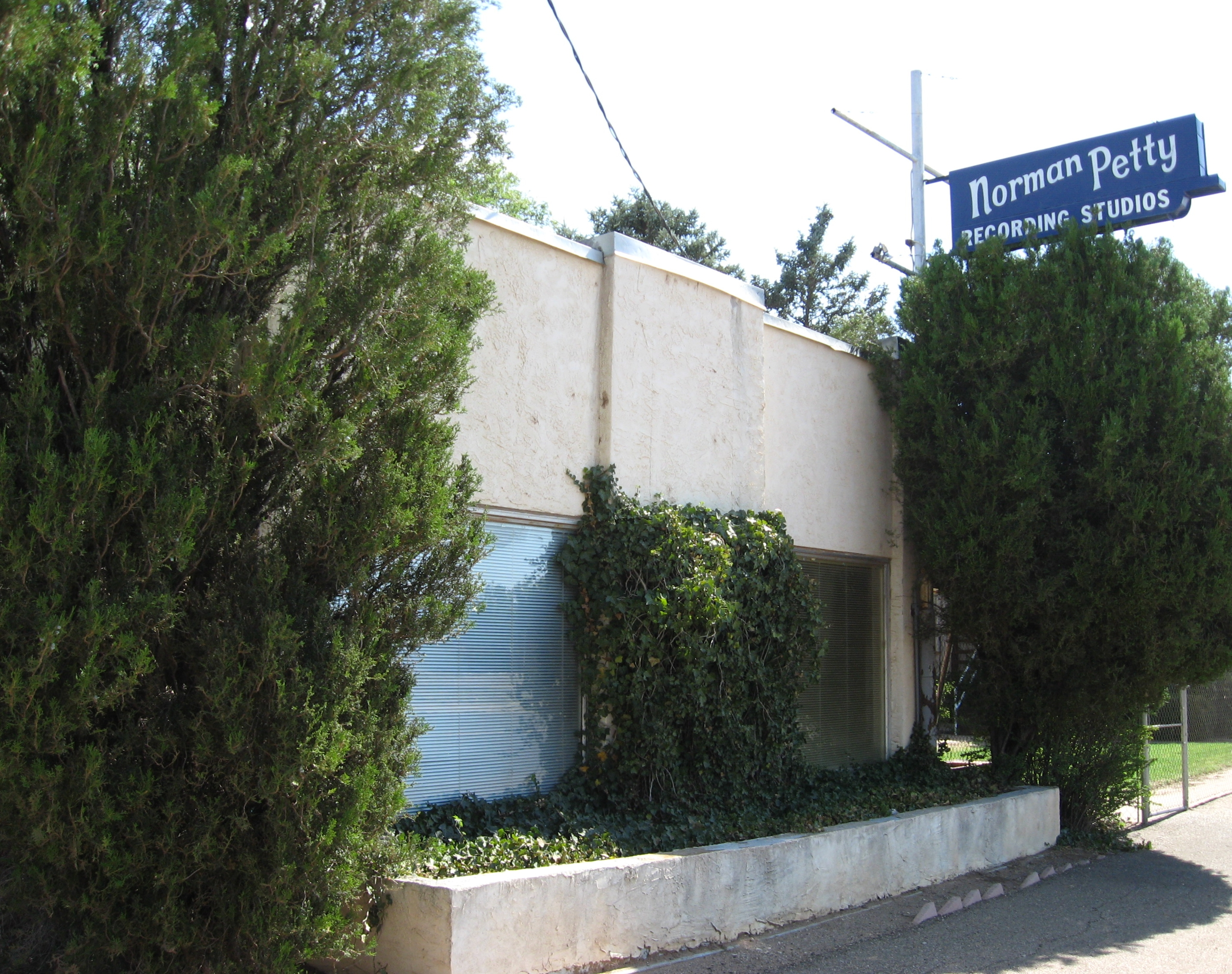
- Norman Petty Recording Studios
- Established: 12 October 1954
- Location: 1313 W 7th Street, Clovis, US
- Coordinates: 34°24′16″N 103°13′16″W
- Type: Music museum
- Founder: Norman Petty
- Website: normanpettystudios.com/home

Norman Petty Recording Studios is a music recording studio in Clovis, New Mexico, first established by Norman Petty in 1954. Petty's studio became part of the rock and roll and rockabilly movement of the 1950s, serving as a recording location for Buddy Holly and the Crickets and the Fireballs, among others.

== History ==
Petty had been operating a makeshift recording studio in his father's garage, but in 1954, following the success of the Norman Petty Trio's version of "Mood Indigo", Petty acquired an adjacent building at 1313 West 7th Street, which formerly housed a grocery store, and began converting it into a recording studio. The first recording session at the still-unfinished studio was on October 12, 1954, when Jimmy Self recorded "An Old Christmas Card / Blue Christmas". The completed studio had a 22-by-19.4-foot (6.7 by 5.9 m) tracking room with a 10-foot-high (3.0 m) ceiling, an 11.5-by-13-foot (3.5 by 4.0 m) reception area that also served as an isolation booth, and an 11.5-by-13-foot (3.5 by 4.0 m) control room outfitted it with an Ampex 401A tape recorder and a custom Altec mixer. Instruments and equipment in the studio included Petty's Hammond B-3 organ and dual Leslie speaker cabinets, a Baldwin grand piano, a celeste, and Telefunken U 47, RCA 77-D, RCA 44BX, and Altec 639 and M21b microphones. The studio also utilized an echo chamber that Petty had previously built in a space above his father's garage. Petty set the recording studio's pricing at a per-song, rather than hourly, rate.

In 1956, Roy Orbison and The Teen Kings recorded "Ooby Dooby" and "Tryin' to Get You" at the studio, and these recordings would become Orbison's first single. Later that year, Buddy Knox's "Party Doll" and Jimmy Bowen with The Rhythm Orchids' "I'm Stickin' with You" were recorded at the studio. Inspired by those songs, Buddy Holly visited the studio with drummer Jerry Allison, bassist Joe B. Mauldin, and rhythm guitarist Niki Sullivan, and the group recorded a demo of "That'll Be the Day", a song they'd previously recorded in Nashville. Holly was pleased with the new recording, and the demo was released as a single, credited to The Crickets.

During the years that the studio was in operation (1955 through 1969), artists recording at the studio included Roy Orbison, Carolyn Hester, The Champs, JD Souther, and the Fireballs. Waylon Jennings worked as a session musician at the studio early in his career, which led to him being hired as Buddy Holly's bassist for the "Winter Dance Party" tour in 1959, just before Holly's fatal plane crash.

Petty stopped using the studio in 1969, after building a new 24-track studio in the former Mesa Theater building. The original studio is currently operated as a museum with private tours available by appointment, with all of the studio's original equipment still inside. In March 2026 Charley Crockett became the first artist in 3 decades to record at the studio. He would record his album Clovis in just 6 days at the studio, and initially release the record on April 28, 2026, just 3 weeks after his last record dropped.

== Selected list of recordings (by year) ==
- Roy Orbison and The Teen Kings - "Ooby Dooby" (1956)
- Buddy Knox - "Party Doll" (1957)
- Jimmy Bowen with The Rhythm Orchids - "I'm Stickin' with You" (1957)
- The Crickets - That'll Be the Day (1957)
- Buddy Holly - "Peggy Sue" (1957)
- The Crickets - "Oh, Boy!" (1957)
- Charlie Phillips - "Sugartime" (1957)
- Carolyn Hester - Scarlet Ribbons (1958)
- Waylon Jennings — Jole Blon (1958)
- The String-A-Longs - Wheels (The String-A-Longs song) (1960)
- Jimmy Gilmer and the Fireballs - "Sugar Shack" (1963)
- The Fireballs - "Daisy Petal Pickin'" (1967)
- The Fireballs - "Bottle of Wine" (1967)
- LeAnn Rimes — "All That" (1994)
- Charley Crockett - "Clovis" (2026)
