= Joe B. Mauldin =

American rock and roll musician and songwriter (1940–2015)

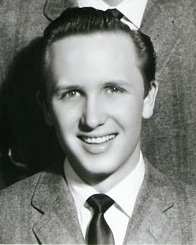
- Mauldin in 1958

Background information
- Born: Joseph Benson Mauldin Jr. July 8, 1940; Lubbock, Texas, U.S.
- Died: February 7, 2015 (aged 74) Nashville, Tennessee, U.S.
- Genres: Rock and roll
- Occupations: Musician, songwriter, audio engineer
- Instruments: Double bass; electric bass

Joseph Benson Mauldin Jr. (July 8, 1940 – February 7, 2015) was an American bassist, songwriter, and audio engineer who was best known as the bassist for the early rock and roll group the Crickets. Mauldin initially played a double bass, then switched to a Fender Precision electric bass. After several years with the Crickets, he became a recording engineer at Gold Star Studios, the Los Angeles studio which became the "hit factory" for Phil Spector, Brian Wilson, and other major 1960s rock performers.

== Biography ==
Mauldin was born in Lubbock, Texas. When he was four, his parents divorced. During his time at Lubbock Junior High, he learned piano, trumpet and steel guitar. He was one of the founding members of the Crickets, the others being Buddy Holly, drummer Jerry Allison, and guitarist Niki Sullivan. The first rock band he played in, starting in 1955, was a Lubbock group named the Four Teens. He appears to have recorded with this band (which included recording artist Terry Noland) in Dallas, prior to his recording with Buddy Holly in Clovis, New Mexico. After Holly's death in 1959, Mauldin played on and off as an original Cricket with J.I. Allison, Sonny Curtis, Glen D. Hardin, and occasionally Niki Sullivan.

After several years with the Crickets, he became a recording engineer at Gold Star Studios, the Los Angeles studio which became the "hit factory" for Phil Spector, Brian Wilson, and other major 1960s rock performers.

Mauldin was inducted into the West Texas Walk of Fame in Lubbock and the Musicians Hall of Fame and Museum in Nashville, Tennessee, as an original Cricket. In 2012, he was inducted into the Rock and Roll Hall of Fame as a member of the Crickets by a special committee which corrected the mistake of not including the Crickets with Buddy Holly when he was first inducted in 1986.

Mauldin died of cancer in Nashville, Tennessee, on February 7, 2015, aged 74.
