= The Day the Music Died =

1959 American plane crash

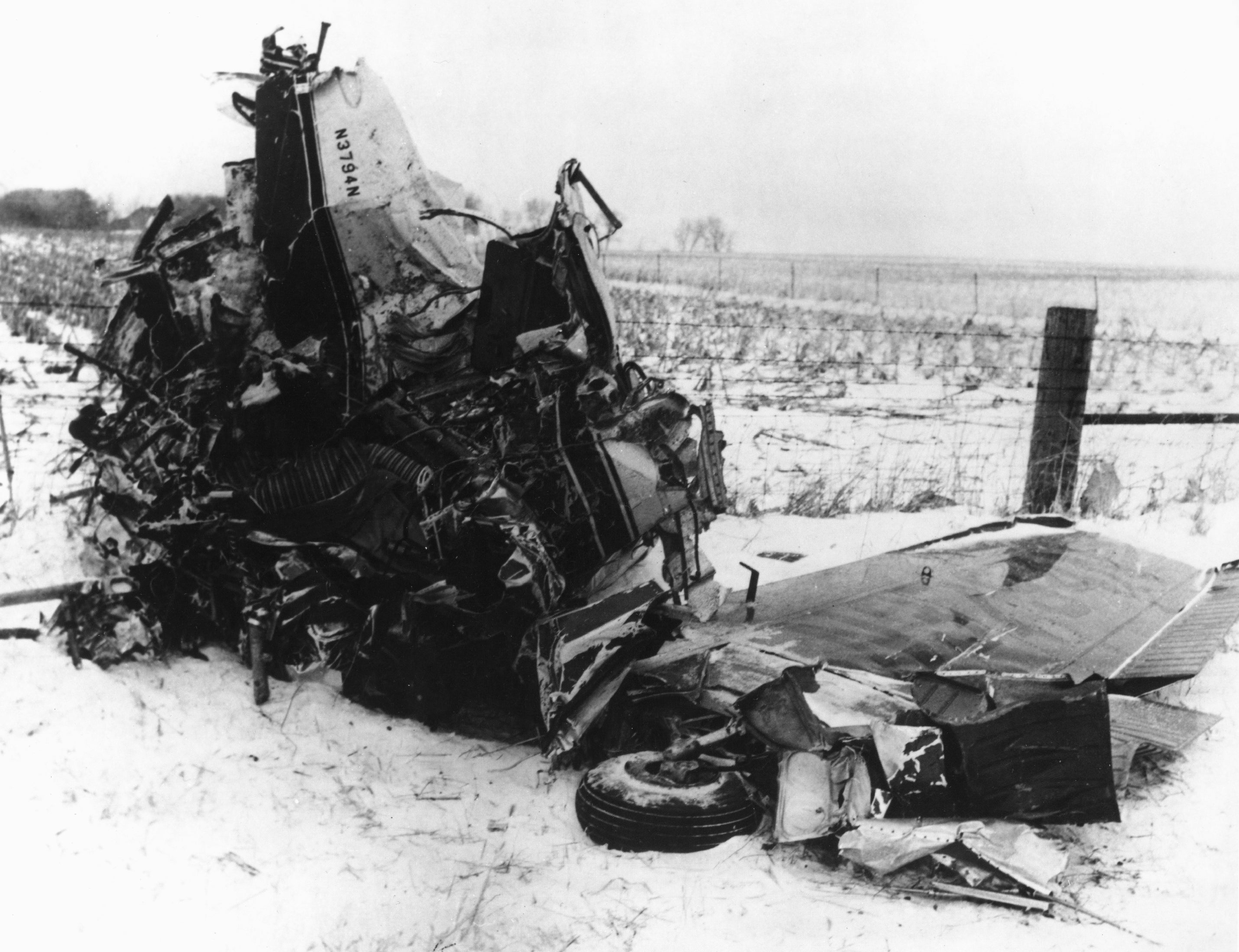
- The wreckage of the Bonanza at the crash site

Accident
- Date: February 3, 1959; 67 years ago
- Summary: Crashed following loss of control in poor weather at night
- Site: Grant Township, Cerro Gordo County, Iowa, U.S.; 43°13′13.3″N 93°22′53.1″W

Aircraft
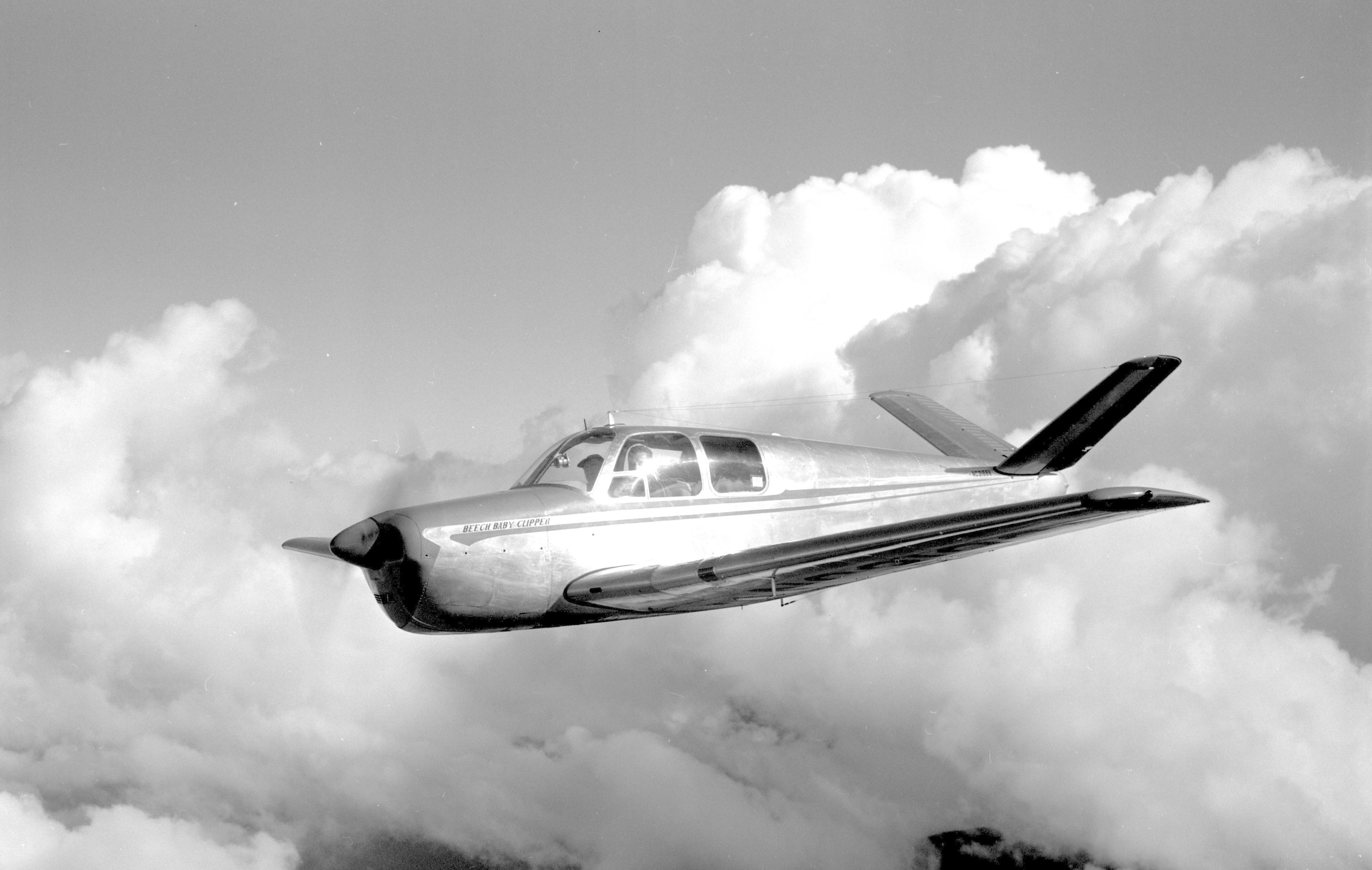
- A V-tailed Bonanza similar to N3794N, the accident aircraft
- Aircraft type: Beechcraft Bonanza
- Operator: Dwyer Flying Service, Mason City, Iowa, U.S.
- Registration: N3794N
- Flight origin: Mason City Municipal Airport, Iowa, U.S.
- Destination: Hector Airport, North Dakota, U.S.
- Occupants: 4
- Passengers: 3 (Buddy Holly, Ritchie Valens, The Big Bopper)
- Crew: 1
- Fatalities: 4
- Survivors: 0

On February 3, 1959, American rock and roll musicians Buddy Holly, Ritchie Valens, and "The Big Bopper" J. P. Richardson were killed in a plane crash near Clear Lake, Iowa, together with pilot Roger Peterson. (Note: This was one of three notable aviation incidents to occur on this date; the other two were the crash of American Airlines Flight 320 in New York City (which knocked the story of the Clear Lake crash down the headlines in the newspapers) and the near crash of Pan Am Flight 115 near Newfoundland.) The event later became known as "The Day the Music Died" after singer-songwriter Don McLean referred to it as such in his 1971 song "American Pie".

At the time, Holly and his band, consisting of Waylon Jennings, Tommy Allsup, and Carl Bunch, were playing on the "Winter Dance Party" tour across the American Midwest. Rising artists Valens, Richardson, Frankie Sardo and vocal group Dion and the Belmonts had joined the tour as well. The long journeys between venues in poorly heated tour buses adversely affected the performers, with cases of flu and even frostbite.

After performing in Clear Lake, and frustrated by the conditions on the tour buses, Holly chose to charter a plane to reach their next venue in Moorhead, Minnesota. Richardson, suffering from the flu, swapped places with Jennings, taking his seat on the plane, while Allsup lost his seat to Valens on a coin toss. Shortly after takeoff, late at night and in poor, wintry weather conditions, the pilot lost control of the light aircraft, a Beechcraft Bonanza, which crashed into a field, killing all four on board.

The event has since been mentioned or referenced in various media. Various monuments have been erected at the crash site and in Clear Lake, where an annual memorial concert is held at the Surf Ballroom, the venue that hosted the artists' last performances.

== Background ==
Early in 1957, Buddy Holly was dropped by Decca Records after his singles sold poorly. He then moved back to Lubbock, Texas, and started a new band with drummer Jerry Allison and guitarist Niki Sullivan. Holly and his new band, The Crickets, started recording with producer Norman Petty in Clovis, New Mexico. Petty signed the group to Coral Records, Holly as a soloist and The Crickets as a band. By the end of 1957, the group was enjoying success: Holly's solo release "Peggy Sue" sold one million copies by December, while the same month the band made their first televised appearance on The Arthur Murray Party. Holly and the Crickets started 1958 with a tour through the northeastern United States in January, followed by an appearance on The Ed Sullivan Show, and a week-long tour of Australia. The band then toured England for 15 days in March.

By that summer after the end of his latest tour, Holly married María Elena Santiago. Following their honeymoon, they settled in New York City. Holly would then return to Clovis for his recordings, and in September 1958 he produced a single for KLLL DJ Waylon Jennings. As he toured, Holly's interests expanded to the business side of his career: he considered that moving full-time to New York City would bring him closer to his label, his publisher, and the major tour booking agencies. Meanwhile, the singer grew unhappy with the management of Petty, who opposed Holly and the Crickets appearing on Hollywood magazine promotions and the popular rock-and-roll movies of the time. Additionally, Petty controlled the finances of Holly and the Crickets and all of their expenditures were paid by him upon approval. María Elena Holly later stated: "any money you got had to go through Norman".

After their performance with Holly on American Bandstand, The Crickets flew on their own to New Mexico to finish their business dealings with Petty. The band members were not fully convinced to move to New York City, and Petty persuaded them to keep him as their manager. As the band communicated their decision to Holly, the singer let them retain the name and he continued as a soloist. Holly desired to stop touring, but while he was easily released from his management contract, he had to hire attorney Harold Orenstein to dispute the control of his royalties with an unresponsive Petty, who had full access to the funds.

While the contest with Petty paralyzed Holly's plan to build his own studio in Lubbock to produce new artists, he took classes at Lee Strasberg's Actors Studio and he worked on his physique and personal image to shift the focus of his career. In need of money, Holly turned to promoter Irving Feld, who convinced him to join on a package tour of the ballrooms of the Upper Midwest organized by the General Amusement Corporation. Holly then assembled a band consisting of Jennings (bass), Tommy Allsup (guitar) and Carl Bunch (drums), with the opening vocals of Frankie Sardo. Despite the agreement with his former band, the tour's publicity agency often billed Holly's new backup band as the Crickets.

Headlining the tour with Holly was J.P. "The Big Bopper" Richardson, whose single "Chantilly Lace" peaked at number 3 on November 3, 1958. The success of the song led Richardson to quit his job as a DJ for KTRM in Beaumont, Texas, to dedicate himself to performing and touring full-time. Richardson had appeared twice on The Dick Clark Saturday Night Beech-Nut Show.

The Winter Dance Party also included Ritchie Valens, who had a double hit with his single "Donna" and its flipside, "La Bamba", which reached number 2 and number 22 on the Billboard Hot Singles chart, respectively. Valens had recently appeared on American Bandstand and NBC's The Music Shop to perform "Donna" and "La Bamba", and had filmed a small part in the rock-and-roll movie Go, Johnny, Go!.

The fourth act billed in the package show was Dion and the Belmonts: The band had originally been on tour with Holly for three weeks in late 1958 on the Biggest Show of Stars, during which they befriended the singer. That year, they appeared in American Bandstand singing "I Wonder Why", and they later were signed to appear on the Winter Dance Party.

== The tour ==
Winter Dance Party Tour schedule, 1959

The tour was set to cover twenty-four Midwestern cities in as many days, and it was originally planned with no nights off. Analyzing the schedule, Holly became frustrated by what he considered to be poor organization: he discovered that the arrangement of the dates and the location of the venues was poorly coordinated, and that it required the bands to zig-zag throughout the region. Holly called the General Amusement Corporation to try to call off the contract, but the company refused and a financially troubled Holly saw himself forced to comply, having received an advance of US$2,500 (equivalent to $28,000 in 2025).

At the time, the Midwest region was going through the coldest winter in 30 years. The General Artists Corporation leased the buses for the tour from a company in Chicago that offered a low bid, with units that would often stall and leave the traveling party far away from gas stations. Additionally, the heating systems were seldom functional. Holly, Valens and the rest of the musicians would often sing to lift up the spirits of the crew under the bad conditions. The passengers often slept in the baggage racks or stretched out across two seats. As the Interstate Highway System was still under construction, the distances were at the time longer and the two-lane country roads harder to travel.

The musicians traveled by train from Chicago to Milwaukee, where the tour started at the Million Dollar Ballroom on January 23. The previous day, the city had experienced its heaviest snowfall in 12 years, 13 inches (33 cm). Despite the cold weather, the audience showed up in good numbers. The musicians found the stage conditions to be consistently under-delivered throughout the tour, such as poorly lit stages and dated sound systems. On January 24, they played the Eagles Club in Kenosha, Wisconsin. Holly was receiving US$500 (equivalent to $6,000 in 2025) each night. Upon seeing the amount of cash that Holly was carrying, Allsup gave him a .22 caliber revolver for protection, which the singer kept loaded in the bottom of his toilet kit. Holly phoned his wife twice a day, and he often had Valens hold the phone for her to listen to his on-stage performance of "True Love Ways". In the early hours of January 25, they drove 350 miles (560 km) to their next engagement in Mankato, Minnesota. Following their route to Eau Claire, Wisconsin, the troupe had a meal consisting of sardines, chips, pretzels, and cheese they bought from vending machines.

Shortly before the Eau Claire concert on January 26, the temperatures dropped to −25 °F (−32 °C). Drummer Carl Bunch realized he lost one of the two costumes he had, leaving the band forced to wear only one for the remainder of the tour. For the next show in January 27, they had to travel 250 miles (400 km) to Montevideo, Minnesota. The tour bus was left behind for repairs while the Winter Dance Party personnel were driven to the next date in St. Paul, Minnesota on a unit of the Montevideo Charter Bus Company, where their original bus would move them to the next venue. As the temperatures continued to drop, the musicians played St. Paul on January 28, and then continued to Davenport, Iowa. A cold front moved toward the state of Iowa at the time: winds started blowing, while the rain turned to snow and the conditions lead to several traffic accidents on the road and the closure of the local airport. The musicians had to huddle close together during the 200-mile ride, as the heating failed and they drank spirits to keep themselves warm. Snowfall of 4 inches (10 cm) was expected for the next date in Fort Dodge, Iowa.

Concert poster for the "Winter Dance Party" tour.

The bus traveled the ice-covered roads at 25 miles per hour (40 km/h). As they reached Tipton, Iowa, all of the nine heaters the unit was equipped with had frozen. The crew stopped for fuel and repairs, and during a meal at a local diner, Holly started to propose the idea of chartering a plane to make the next few dates. The chartering of planes was discouraged by the General Artists Corporation, considering it too dangerous. Initially, Holly wanted to charter the aircraft for himself and his band, but Allsup could not afford it. Bunch was losing coordination in his feet, as they became further swollen from the onset of frostbite.

The musicians were dirty, hungry, and tired. Holly changed his own suit for the performance in Fort Dodge, while his musicians played with the same suits they had since the beginning. In Fort Dodge, Holly spoke to local DJ Bill McCollough, who initially offered to fly him and his band to the next venue. The DJ phoned his flight instructor, Larry Geer, but the veteran of 22 years told him that the darkness in the region, plus the sub-zero temperatures and changing weather, made it too risky. Holly continued on the bus. The troupe then traveled 350 miles (560 km) to Duluth, Minnesota.

The bus again broke down in Duluth and Holly re-floated the idea of chartering a plane, but a replacement bus arrived on time to continue 330 miles (530 km) to Appleton, Wisconsin. In the early hours of February 1, the bus broke down close to Pine Lake, Wisconsin on U.S. Route 51, without functioning heating amid temperatures as low as −40 °F (−40 °C). According to a local mechanic, a piston went through the engine block of the bus. The performers tried to flag down cars while burning newspaper in the bus aisles for warmth. A passing truck driver alerted the sheriff's office and the musicians were rescued two hours later. Bunch was rushed to the local Grand View Hospital, where he was admitted after being diagnosed with frostbite in both feet. The show in Appleton was canceled, and the musicians moved on to their next date at the Riverside Ballroom in Green Bay, Wisconsin, taking a Chicago and North Western Railway train from Hurley. Previous to their appearance, Richardson bought a sleeping bag as he was beginning to suffer from the flu. Due to the reduced personnel, Carlo Mastrangelo of the Belmonts had to play drums for Holly, while Valens was playing the drums for Richardson and Holly drummed for Dion and the Belmonts.

While in either Duluth or Green Bay, Valens phoned his manager Bob Keane, who was in California, and informed him of the precarious conditions of the tour. Keane suggested that Valens leave that night, but Valens continued with the troupe. After the show, their planned day off on February 2 was canceled after the agency arranged a last-minute appearance at the Surf Ballroom in Clear Lake, Iowa, 350 miles (560 km) away from Green Bay. The bus that previously broke down was repaired with a replacement engine. They continued the trip, but the unit malfunctioned multiple times again until it was abandoned in the highway and replaced by a rented school bus that featured a functioning heating system. As they arrived in Clear Lake, Holly decided to charter a plane to make the trip to Fargo, North Dakota, as the city had the nearest airport to their next stop in Moorhead, Minnesota. Holly called his wife from the lobby of the ballroom and told her of the broken promises of the promoters, and that he desired to take the flight to have some time to rest and do laundry and cleaning. From the start of the tour, the musicians had changed buses seven different times.

== Accident ==
=== Arrangements ===
On Holly's behalf, Surf Ballroom owner Carroll Anderson phoned Dwyer's Flying Service. While the owner of the company was out for the night, an employee informed Anderson that the flight would cost a total of US$108 (equivalent to $1,190 in 2025), which amounted to US$36 (equivalent to $400 in 2025) for each of the passengers. Roger Peterson, a young pilot working for the company, accepted the flight. Valens, who was afraid of flying, offered Allsup a coin toss for the spot on the plane: Valens won it, while Jennings left his spot to Richardson on account of the singer's large size and of the flu that he was nursing. Meanwhile, Dion DiMucci's account suggested that Holly had rented the plane for the headliners only. In his autobiography, he wrote that the performers (excluding Holly) tossed coins to see who would get on the aircraft since there were only two other seats available. Richardson and DiMucci won, but DiMucci gave up his seat to Valens because he felt that the cost of US$36 for the flight was excessive, as it amounted to the monthly rent of his childhood home. After the show, Anderson drove the three passengers to the airport in Mason City, Iowa, where they were welcomed by Peterson and by Jerry Dwyer, the owner of the plane, as there was light snow and winds.

Though Peterson assured the party that the weather was adequate for their flight, the weather briefings he received failed to relay that deteriorating conditions were forecast along the route. When Peterson attended the Ross Flight School in Oklahoma in late 1958, instrument flight instructor Lambert Fechter remarked that the pilot had issues controlling the plane, and that he experienced vertigo and spiraled to the right, but that it became less frequent as he gained experience. On March 21, 1958, Peterson had failed his first flight check with instruments. Federal Aviation Administration safety inspector Melvin O. Wood cut the test short after Peterson did not maintain his assigned altitude and went into a dive. Wood determined that he was not able to perform a "proper holding procedure".

Peterson's license, issued in November 1958, disqualified him from flying at night. He was hired by Dwyer in July 1958, and by the time of the flight he had 711 flying hours, with 128 on the Beechcraft Bonanza that would carry him and the entertainers. Peterson was 21 years old at the time of the flight and was recently married. The pilot had been flying for the last 17 hours, and the round trip to Fargo would take him about 7 hours. The pilot was supposed to be free on February 3, but either because he was a fan of Holly or because he needed the money, he accepted the flight. Having second thoughts, Peterson phoned a more experienced pilot, Duane Mayfield, to ask him if he wanted to fly the passengers himself. Mayfield declined.

=== Crash ===
Locations of Clear Lake, Mason City Municipal Airport, and the crash site

Jerry Dwyer helped Peterson prepare the Bonanza with tail number N3794N for the flight. The weather at the time of departure was reported to be light snow, with a ceiling of 3,000 feet (900 m) AMSL with sky obscured, visibility 6 miles (9.7 km) and winds from 20 to 30 mph (32 to 48 km/h). The flight took off at 00:55 (12:55 am) CST on Tuesday, February 3, from runway 17 (present-day runway 18). Peterson received a weather report that worsened since his last at 11:55 pm: wind blowing from the South at 20 miles per hour (32 km/h) with gusts of over 30 miles per hour (48 km/h), a ceiling of 3,000 feet (910 m), dropping pressure, a visibility of 6 miles (9.7 km), a temperature of 18 °F (−8 °C) and a dew point of 11. Peterson was not given the two advisories for the region: low visibility due to fog and snow for Iowa and heavy snow for North Dakota. Shortly after takeoff, Peterson stated that he would declare his flight plan over the radio.

Dwyer watched the southbound take-off from a platform outside the control tower. He was able to clearly see the aircraft's tail light for most of the brief flight, which started with an initial 180 degree left turn to pass east of the airport, climbing to approximately 800 feet (240 m) AGL. After an additional left turn to a northwesterly heading, the tail light was observed gradually descending until it disappeared. Two minutes after take-off in the control tower, Dwyer believed he saw the plane go down, but the other flight controller chalked it up to an optical illusion. After the pilot failed to radio in his flight plan, Dwyer became concerned. At his request, the radio operator tried to contact Peterson, to no response.

The Bonanza had impacted the terrain at high speed, on a steep right bank in a nose-down attitude of 315°. The right-wing tip struck the ground first, and parts of the aircraft were spread across the frozen field for a distance of 540 feet (180 yd; 160 m), before the main wreckage came to rest against a wire fence. When the weather cleared in the morning, Dwyer took off on a plane to find the Bonanza by air, at about 9:15 am, while he asked his friend Bob Booe to assist him on the ground. Soon after becoming airborne, at 9:35 am, he noticed the wreckage at a short distance on a field belonging to Albert Juhl.

Dwyer then radioed the sheriff's office that dispatched deputy Bill McGill to the farm. McGill found the wreck and soon thereafter, the scene of the crash was crowded by local police, highway patrol and photographers. The left wing was still attached to the wreckage. The body of Peterson was trapped in the mangled cockpit, and only one of his boots was visible pointing to the sky. The body of Valens was found 17 feet (5.2 m) south of the wreck: dressed in a black wool overcoat and suit, the left leg of the suit was split to the hip and his face facing the south. Holly's body, clothed with a yellow leather jacket split in the back from the force of the impact, was lying close to Valens' facing the southwest. Meanwhile, Richardson's body had been thrown 40 feet (12 m) from the wreckage to an empty cornfield on the neighboring Moffett farm, lying partially on his right side facing the south.

== Aftermath ==
Bob Booe called the radio station KCRG of Cedar Rapids, Iowa with the news of the wreckage, and to announce that prominent passengers were killed in the crash. The station then notified the American Broadcasting Company wire services. Booe later stated that, due to the importance of the events, "You don't sit on their names while they notify their next of kin". A black wallet was found at the site: it had Tommy Allsup's driver's license on it and a Prism Records visit card with Jennings' name scribbled on the back. Allsup had given Holly his driver's license to pick up a certified letter under his name. Identifying Holly, and also believing Allsup was one of the victims, the authorities assumed Jennings was the third victim. A follow-up news report then stated that Holly and his band were killed in the crash.

Meanwhile, Carroll Anderson was called to the scene to identify the bodies. Removing Peterson's remains from the wreck required the use of a blowtorch to cut the fuselage open, an operation that took two hours. The fingerprints of the bodies could not be taken at the scene, since they had been exposed to the elements for 10 hours and it was necessary to thaw them. Coroner Ralph Smiley conducted a partial examination at the scene, and later continued at the funeral homes where the bodies were sent. Smiley ordered an autopsy for Richardson, and he extracted from the belongings of each of the three men the US$11.65 (equivalent to $130 in 2025) of his personal fee.

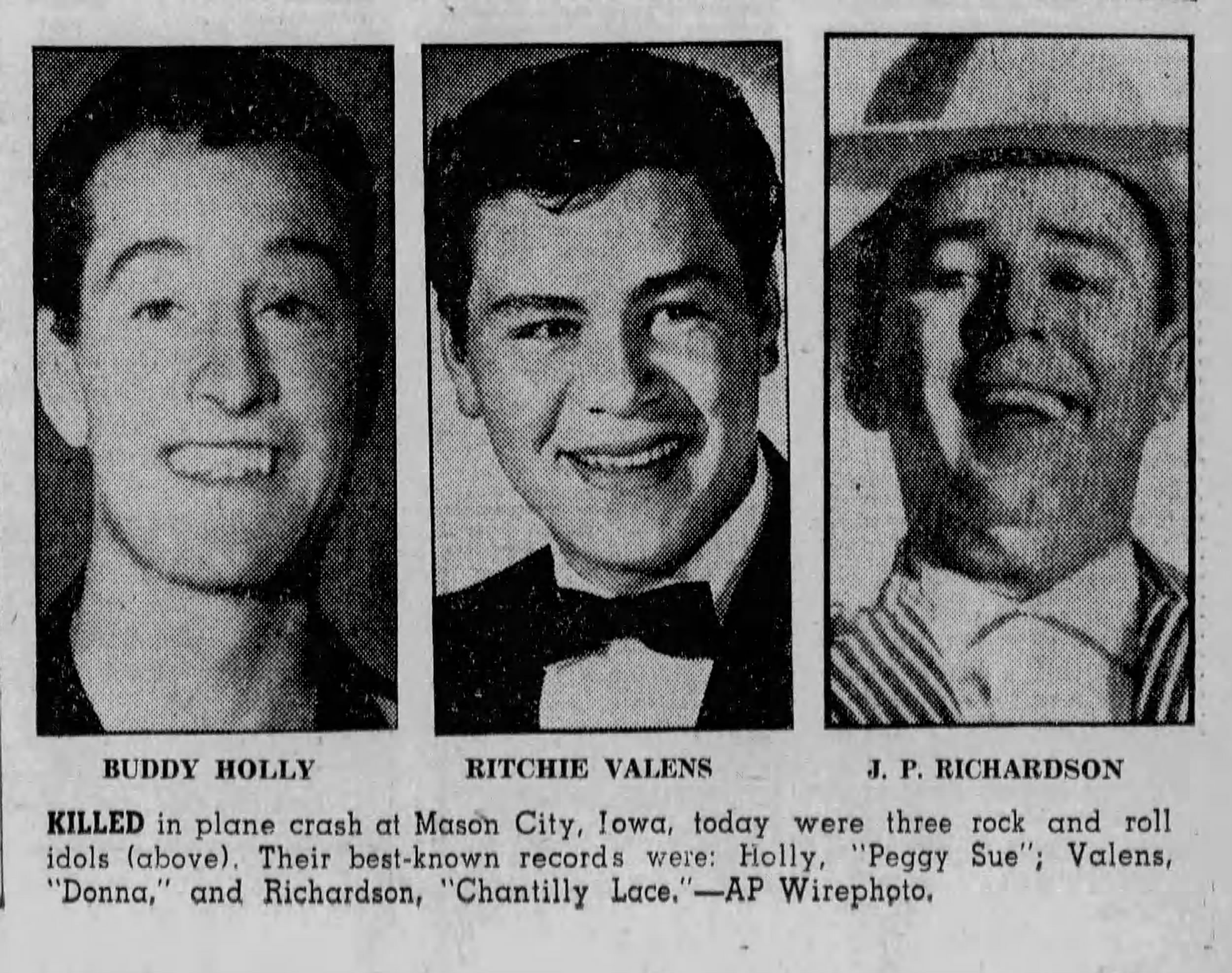
Newspaper clipping, February 3, 1959

Anderson later phoned KRIB DJ Bob Hale, who had emceed the concert at the Surf Ballroom, to confirm to him that the deceased were Holly, Valens, and Richardson. Hale had already received the bulletin of a wreck close to Mason City early that morning. An upset Hale announced the death of the performers live on his show, and he then found a replacement to continue playing Holly tunes while he notified the United Press International wire service.

Richardson's radio station in Texas, KTRM, received the news from the listeners who started to call in after they heard the reports from other competing stations. Richardson's wife, Teetsie, was informed of the crash by her brother with a doctor. Her brother had learned of the news from a Louisiana radio station.

Jennings' family heard the news and believed that he was among the victims. At 12:30 pm, the bus carrying the unaware band reached their hotel in Fargo. Soon, Tommy Allsup learned of the news from the clerk, and he broke them to Jennings and the rest of the entourage. Allsup then phoned his family in Oklahoma, while Jennings called his family in Texas. In a state of shock, Jennings wanted to quit the tour: his last interaction with Holly happened while he and the singer ate hot dogs before the party left for the airport, where Holly said "I hope your damned bus freezes up again", while Jennings replied in jest "I hope your old plane crashes". Jennings lived with survivor guilt for years after the crash.

Meanwhile, in Lubbock, Texas, not knowing that the family had not yet been notified, KLLL aired the report. Holly's parents learned of the news from the reports of KLLL, which they tuned into after they received calls from relatives who did not want to break the news to them over the phone. Holly's protege Lou Giordano called María Elena Holly at their apartment in New York City and asked her not to turn on her television set until her aunt arrived. Curious about what had happened, she also learned of the news from the media. Holly's wife entered into shock and she miscarried her five-week pregnancy. The news also reached Valens' family over the media—both his mother and his sister received the news from the radio.

Allsup and Jennings were contacted by the General Amusement Corporation to finish the tour. The agency promised the two to pay their flight to Holly's funeral plus the singer's share of the remaining 16 dates of the tour amounting to US$4,000 (equivalent to $44,000 in 2025). In need of the cash, both of them accepted. That night in Moorhead, Minnesota, the band The Shadows, fronted by 15-year old Robert Velline joined the tour, while singer Ronnie Smith flew in from Texas to replace Holly backed by Jennings and Allsup. The tour ran for another two weeks.

Peterson was buried on February 5, 1959 at the Buena Vista Memorial Cemetery in Storm Lake, Iowa, meanwhile Richardson was buried the next day at Forest Lawn Memorial Park in Beaumont, Texas. Holly's funeral took place on February 7 at the Tabernacle Baptist Church in Lubbock, Texas. Due to his engagement on the tour, Jennings was unable to attend. The same day, Valens' funeral took place at the St. Ferdinand Catholic Church in San Fernando, California. He was interred at the San Fernando Mission Cemetery.

== Investigation ==
=== Civil Aeronautics Board investigation ===
Prior to the arrival of its investigators at the scene, the Civil Aeronautics Board had allowed for the removal of Peterson's body from the mangled plane by cutting the cockpit open. The board reported in its findings regarding the crash in September 1959 that Peterson had 52 hours of dual instrument training, and that he had passed his written examination, while it also noted that the pilot had failed his flight check. Furthermore, the investigators remarked that both his training and tests were performed with conventional attitude indicators, instead of the F3 Gyro model built by the Sperry Corporation that the Beechcraft Bonanza was equipped with. The report noted that a conventional artificial horizon provided the bank and pitch attitude of the plane using as a reference a miniature representation of the aircraft as seen from the back. While the Sperry F3 gyroscope presented the pilot with the same information, the Civil Aeronautics board clarified that the stabilized sphere showed the image inverted 180° in respect to the conventional artificial horizon.

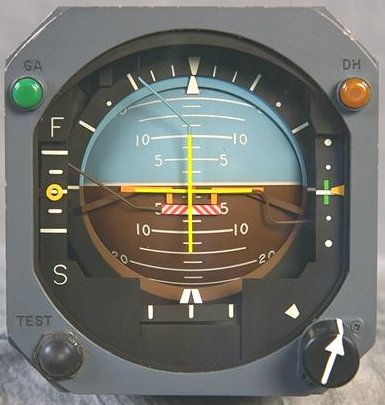
A conventional artificial horizon: sky on top, ground at the bottom

A Sperry F3 attitude gyroscope: ground on top, sky at the bottom

The analysis indicated that there was no evidence that Peterson had been briefed on the advisories by the U.S. Weather Bureau and that it could have contributed to the pilot underestimating the flight conditions. It further clarified that the communicator was responsible for providing the pilots with all the information available at the time and its possible interpretation, but that the operator was accountable for its final decision. The Civil Aeronautics Board wrote that Dwyer relied on his confidence of Peterson's operational judgment, while it also clarified that the company was certified to fly with visual flight rules only night and day. Furthermore, they considered that the already deteriorating weather condition, combined with the pilot's inability to fly with instruments made the decision to take off "most imprudent". The investigators concluded that soon after he was airborne, Peterson entered into spatial disorientation due to the darkness, snowfall, and the loss of a definitive horizon that required him to use instruments. Moreover, they considered that the high gusty winds and the high turbulence would make the interpretation of the attitude of the aircraft based solely on the climb and turn and slip indicators complicated for an inexperienced pilot. The board considered that the use of the attitude gyroscope would be sufficient for an inexperienced pilot, as it tended to be stable under those conditions. While the gyroscope was found to be caged at the scene of the crash, it was deemed not possible to determine if it was used or not during the flight. The investigators considered that Peterson may have been confused by the inverted pictorial representation of the instrument, and that while the pilot may have thought he was climbing, he was instead descending. As the probable cause the report concluded that it was "the pilot's unwise decision to embark on a flight which would necessitate flying solely by instruments when he was not properly certificated or qualified to do so. Contributing factors were serious deficiencies in the weather briefing, and the pilot's unfamiliarity with the instrument which determines the attitude of the aircraft."

=== Autopsies and later investigations ===
The county coroner, Ralph Smiley, arrived at the scene of the crash at 11:15 am on February 3, 1959 and he conducted a preliminary investigation. The same day, the bodies of Valens and Holly were examined by Smiley at the Wilcox Funeral Home in Clear Lake. The examination of Richardson's remains took place the next day at the same mortuary. The coroner reported that the four victims had died instantly, the cause of death being gross trauma.

Upon arriving to Iowa to retrieve his brother's body, Larry Holly visited the scene of the crash. In it, he retrieved Holly's shaving kit. The bag had its side zip-up compartment missing along with Holly's cash earnings and the .22 revolver he carried. The cash never appeared, while the gun was found by Albert Juhl after the snow melted. A bullet was missing in the chamber at the time Juhl turned it to the authorities, which sparked rumors of a possible discharge of the revolver on the plane prior to the crash. Juhl later admitted that he had fired the bullet to test if the gun worked after months in the frozen ground.

On March 6, 2007, in Beaumont, Texas, Richardson's body was exhumed for reburial. Forest Lawn Cemetery moved his body to a more suitable area after plans were made to erect a bronze statue near his grave site to accompany a newly received historical marker. As the body was to be placed in a new casket while above ground, the musician's son, Jay Perry Richardson, took the opportunity to have his father's body re-examined to verify the original coroner's findings and asked forensic anthropologist William M. Bass to carry out the procedure. The longstanding rumor of an accidental firearm discharge, as well as the speculation that Richardson initially survived the crash and crawled out of the wreckage in search of help before succumbing to his injuries, was discarded after Bass and his team took several X-rays of Richardson's body and eventually concluded that the musician had indeed died instantly from extensive fractures to virtually every bone in his body. No traces of lead were found from any bullet, nor any indication that he had been shot.

In March 2015, the National Transportation Safety Board received a request to reopen the investigation into the accident. The request was made by L. J. Coon, a retired pilot from New England who felt that the conclusion of the 1959 investigation was inaccurate. Coon suspected a possible failure of the right ruddervator, or a problem with the fuel system, as well as possible improper weight distribution. The board declined the request in April 2015, saying that the evidence presented by Coon was insufficient to merit the reconsideration of the original findings.

== Legacy ==
Inspired by the death of the three entertainers, then-KFXM DJ Tommy Dee from San Bernardino, California wrote a tribute song called "Three Stars" on the night of the accident. On February 5, 1959, the song was recorded by Eddie Cochran, a friend of Holly and Valens. The purpose of the recording was to divide the royalties of the song for the families of the deceased. While Cochran's version remained unreleased until 1966, Dee's version was released in 1959. In the months following the crash, the media stopped broadcasting the names of victims before the next of kin were notified.

Following Holly's death, "It Doesn't Matter Anymore" peaked at number 13 on the Billboard Hot Singles Chart and Decca Records put out compilations of his music. While his recordings sold well in the United States, Holly's large sales in the United Kingdom prompted his label to publish unreleased recordings, demos and outtakes of his recording sessions.

In 1961, writer Geoff Goddard composed for British producer Joe Meek the song "Tribute to Buddy Holly". Meek, who was interested in occultism, held séances to attempt to contact Holly to gain his approval for the release of the song. Meek then gave the composition to singer Mike Berry, who later said that while he did not share the producer's beliefs, that he liked the idea of recording a tribute for Holly. Berry also denied the rumor that his recording was banned by the BBC, and he clarified that he saw the paperwork approving of its broadcast, while he attributed its few plays to the lack of interest by show producers. "Tribute to Buddy Holly" reached number 24 on the UK Singles Chart. Ten years after the singer's death, in 1969, the Buddy Holly Appreciation Society in the UK had a membership of 20,000.

"American Pie"
The song "American Pie" dubbed the accident "The Day The Music Died"

In 1971, singer Don McLean released the song "American Pie": by January 15, 1972 it reached the top of the Billboard Hot 100, where it stayed for four weeks. McLean wrote "American Pie" as he was 24 years old, with the narration centered around the plane crash described by himself as "the day the music died". The line of McLean's song would later be used to refer to the accident in popular culture. McLean had first learned of the accident while working his route as a paperboy in New Rochelle, New York. In a 1972 interview with P. F. Kluge for Life, while the composer refused to clarify the meaning of all of the lyrics to the song, he stated "I like paying my debts" regarding his acknowledgment of Holly and the accident. Furthermore, McLean told Kluge: "Buddy Holly was the first and last person I idolized as a kid", he continued "I liked Holly because he spoke to me", and then he added that the singer was "a symbol of something deeper than the music he made". McLean then told the Des Moines Register that his composition used the event as a starting point to narrate what he perceived to be the loss of the American innocence of the 1950s, as the country changed with the counterculture of the 1960s and the Vietnam War. McLean stated: “The music is the poetry of life, it’s the spirit of something [...] It’s the essence of art. It’s so many things. So, as the song develops after each verse, that music has died, you see? So I realize as a metaphor it was perfect for what I was thinking". A popular misconception is that the aircraft was called American Pie, but no record exists of any name ever having been given to N3794N.

Jerry Dwyer died in 2016 at the age of 85. During an interview in 2009, Dwyer deemed the plane crash "the worst thing that ever happened" to him until the death of his oldest son. In the decades following the accident, Dwyer would often join the yearly tribute concert at the Surf Ballroom and he became close to the people in the remaining Holly scene. Dwyer did not consider that the results of the investigation by the Civil Aeronautics Board were correct and in multiple occasions, he mentioned that he was writing a book about the crash. At the time of his death, his wife Barbara announced that she was working with a California author to release the book.

=== Concerts and events ===
In 1978, DJ Darryl Hensley started the rock-and-roll FM station KZEV in Clear Lake, Iowa. The first anniversary of the station coincided with the 20th anniversary of the date of the concert at the Surf Ballroom, which led Hensley to organize the Tribute to Buddy Holly Concert. Hensley turned to the Buddy Holly Memorial Society to form a line-up for the event: Waylon Jennings rejected the offer as he did not desire to return to Clear Lake on account of his "bad memories", while Dion DiMucci's fee was too expensive. Due to scheduling conflicts Paul McCartney, Linda Ronstadt, Don McLean, Gary Busey, Bobby Vee, and members of the Holly family could not appear on the show. Hensley then filled the line-up with singer Jimmy Clanton, Nikki Sullivan, The Drifters, Del Shannon, the local cover band the White Sidewalls, and DJ Wolfman Jack. The Tribute to Buddy Holly Concert took place on February 2, 1979 at the Surf Ballroom with the attendance of an audience of 1,700 spectators coming from 36 states and Canada. The proceeds of the tickets at a price of US$17.50 (equivalent to $78 in 2025) went to the Buddy Holly Memorial Society, as well as to the local charity Handicapped Village.

The concert would later become an annual event. In 1988, a conflict arose between Hensley and the new owner of the Surf Ballroom, Darrell Hein. Hein planned to hold at the Surf Ballroom a memorial event for Valens and Richardson in the immediate nights before the tenth annual Buddy Holly Tribute would take place. The Surf Ballroom's manager later told the Toronto Star that he planned to also make it an annual event. In 1989, Hensley moved his Holly tribute to the North Iowa Fair Grounds, but he canceled it after the tickets sold poorly. The public instead purchased tickets to Hein's event at the original venue. In 1990, KZEV was sold to the Minnesota-based Lindner Broadcasting Group who said they wanted to re-start Hensley's event. That year, Hein moved his tribute event to August with the original Crickets as the headliner. In 1992, the new owner of the Surf Ballroom, Bruce Christiansen, expanded the Holy tribute to a four-night event. In 1994, McLean performed for the first time in the tribute at the Surf Ballroom.

For the 40th anniversary of the Winter Dance Party in 1999, a Holly tribute band fronted by John Mueller played the same eleven cities as Holly, Richardson, and Valens on the same dates. During the 1990s, Mueller portrayed Holly in the musical Buddy: The Buddy Holly Story. The Winter Dance Party Tour later became an annual event: while the troupe repeated the same schedule the following year, they deemed it too exhausting and in follow-up tours they scheduled the dates in a more convenient order. Regarding the original tour schedule and distances, Mueller called the order they followed "an incredibly grueling tour". In 2008, Tommy Allsup joined Mueller (as Holly), Ray Anthony (as Ritchie Valens) and J. P. Richardson, Jr. (as his father).

By 2009, five of the original 11 venues still existed. The Winter Dance party tour was at the time also performing year-round dates in other locations. The 50th anniversary of the original Surf Ballroom concert took place on February 2, 2009, with Delbert McClinton, Joe Ely, Wanda Jackson, Los Lobos, Chris Montez, Bobby Vee, Graham Nash, Peter and Gordon, Tommy Allsup, and a house band featuring Chuck Leavell, James "Hutch" Hutchinson, Bobby Keys, and Kenny Aronoff. J. P. Richardson, Jr. was among the participating artists, and Bob Hale was the master of ceremonies, as he was at the 1959 concert. After the death of Richardson's son in August 2013, the Big Bopper was portrayed by Linwood Sasser. On February 3, 2021, McLean performed at the Surf Ballroom to kick off his American Pie 50th Anniversary tour on the first night of the Winter Dance Party tribute. The recreation and live show is endorsed by the estates of Buddy Holly, Ritchie Valens, and Richardson.

=== Memorials ===
In 1988, the new manager of the Surf Ballroom, Darrell Hein, donated US$4,000 (equivalent to $11,000 in 2025) for the construction of a 6-foot (1.8 m) tall granite memorial bearing the names of Peterson and the three entertainers. In February 1988, Valens' siblings, Connie and Bob, visited the Surf Ballroom and the site of the crash for the first time. In June of that year, the memorial was dedicated after a convertible parade that included Maria Elena Holly on a 1957 Ford Fairlane, Jay P. Richardson (son of the singer) on a 1954 Chevrolet Bel Air, Connie Alvarez and Irma Padilla (sisters of Valens) on a 1980 Ford Mustang, and the parents of Roger Peterson together with his re-married widow DeAnn Johnson. The ceremony also included the renaming of a road originating near the Surf Ballroom to "Buddy Holly Place", as well as the turn-over of Richardson's watch to his son. Richardson's watch and Holly's glasses were misfiled by the police, and both were given to María Elena Holly earlier that year. The tenth anniversary of the Surf Ballroom annual concert in 1989 featured Bobby Vee, the Diamonds, and Freddy Cannon. The following day, February 3, 1989, the remaining original Crickets, Allison and Mauldin, played a concert in Fargo, North Dakota, to commemorate the 30th anniversary of the date of the Winter Dance Party that the three entertainers never reached.

On February 4, 1989, Ken Paquette and Chuck Renner, sheet-metal workers from the Marinette Marine shipyard in Marinette, Wisconsin, installed a life-sized guitar made by Paquette at the site of the crash, which had previously been marked only by a flattened fence. On the day both of them mounted the memorial, Paquette saw the inscription "Buddy" in the snow and a guitar pick wedged to a fence post. Paquette originally visited the site in 1987, where he only saw flowers left on a fence: he had to use a picture of the day of the crash to count the fence posts to find the exact place where the aircraft came to rest against the barbed wire. The engraved guitar read: "Buddy Holly Richie Valens Big Bopper 2/3/59". In 1990 Paquette expanded the memorial: he added three sheet-metal records that read "Chantilly Lace", "Peggy Sue", and "Donna" after the hits of the three singers.

In 2003, Paquette was commissioned by The Music Lives Here Committee of Green Bay, Wisconsin, to build a memorial featuring the silhouettes of the three entertainers in sheet-metal to be placed in front of the Riverside Ballroom. The materials were paid for by the committee, while Paquette donated his time. The memorial was dedicated on July 17, 2003. In January 2004, the guitar monument at the crash site was auctioned on eBay to benefit the Winter Dance Party Music Scholarships dedicated to the three singers and Peterson. The highest bidder was local business owner Ellie Harmeyer, whose offer of US$3.309 (equivalent to $5,791 in 2025) closed the auction the same month. The sheet-metal guitar remained at the site of the crash. In 2009, during the 50th anniversary of the accident, Paquette together with Jerry Dwyer and his wife unveiled a small memorial for pilot Roger Peterson at the crash site.

The entrance of the trail leading to the site of the accident is marked by a memorial consisting of a set of metal glasses made by local artist Michael Connor, at the intersection of Gull Avenue and 315th Street in the northern part of Clear Lake. The site and memorials are located 1/2 mi (2,600 ft; 880 yd; 800 m) from the head of the trail. During the 1960s, the farm where the crash happened was purchased by William H. Nicholas. His grandson, Jeff Nicholas, owned the land as of 2024 and he maintained the site of the crash and the surrounding memorials. Nicholas rejected suggestions to pave the road leading to it, or to add lights, and he decided to keep it as a corn and soybean field. Nicholas said: "When you stand out here and close your eyes, you can go right back to 1959".

In 2019, the documentary Gotta Travel on: Remembering When the Music Died was premiered during the 60th anniversary of the Winter Dance Party. In 2013, producer Sevan Garabedian began to work on the film that chronicled the Winter Dance Party and the plane accident: It featured interviews with the musicians of the tour that were still alive at the time, as well as with local fans of the 24 cities were the tour played. The accident was featured in the 2022 documentary The Day the Music Died: The Story of Don McLean's American Pie. The film contained interviews with McLean recounting how he learned of the crash, Dwyer's account of the flight and search of the wreck, and Connie Valens' thanking McLean for his composition. In June 2022, Kenosha, Wisconsin unveiled a Winter Dance Party memorial at Marina Shores. The sculpture by Martin Antaramian consisted of a guitar with the names of all the four acts of the tour engraved in its body. The construction of the monument was financed by fund raising. In February 2026, the Music Experience Center in Clear Lake, inaugurated the immersive exhibit Not Fade Away that featured the history of the Surf Ballroom using video, images, and music, while it also included tributes to the three performers and Peterson. The same month, the Surf Ballroom announced the erection of a life-size bronze statue by sculptor Zenos Frudakis honoring Don McLean, to be unveiled in 2027 for the 55th anniversary of the release of "American Pie". In August 2026, the a life-size statue of Holly, Valens and Richardson was unveiled in front of the Music Experience Center in Clear Lake.

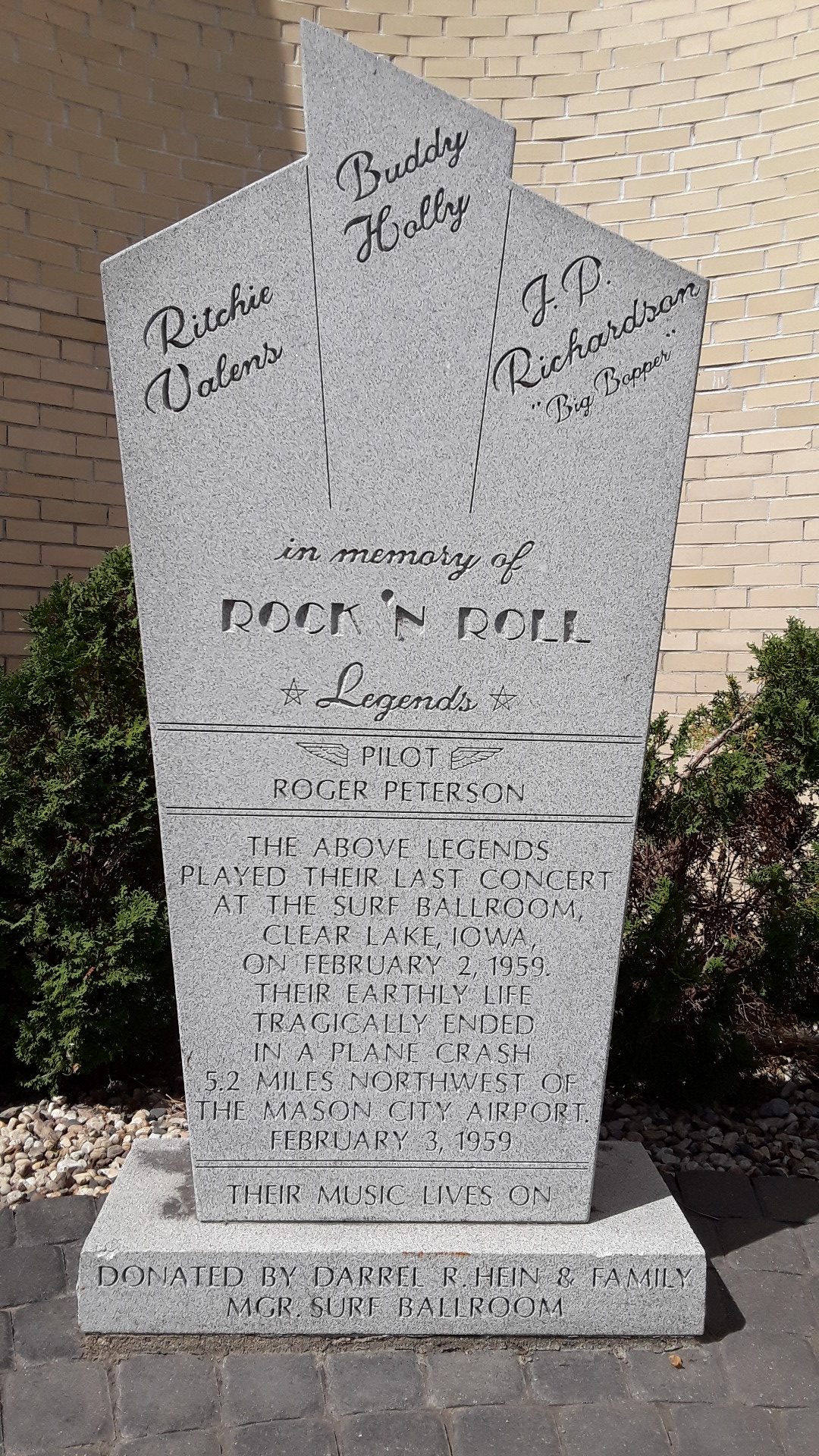
Monument in front of the Surf Ballroom in Clear Lake, Iowa

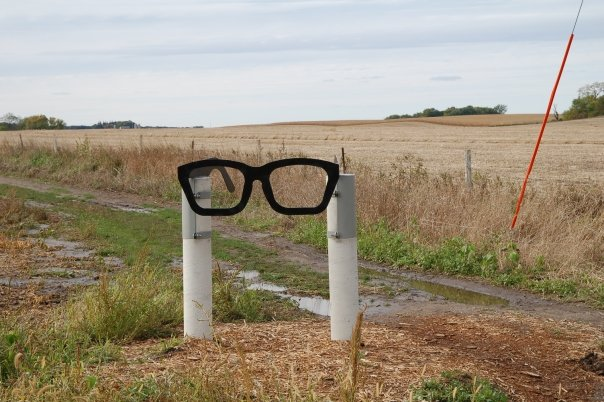
Signpost east of the crash site replicating Holly's signature glasses. The crash site is actually about 1,850 feet (564 m) from this location, down the path along the fence line.

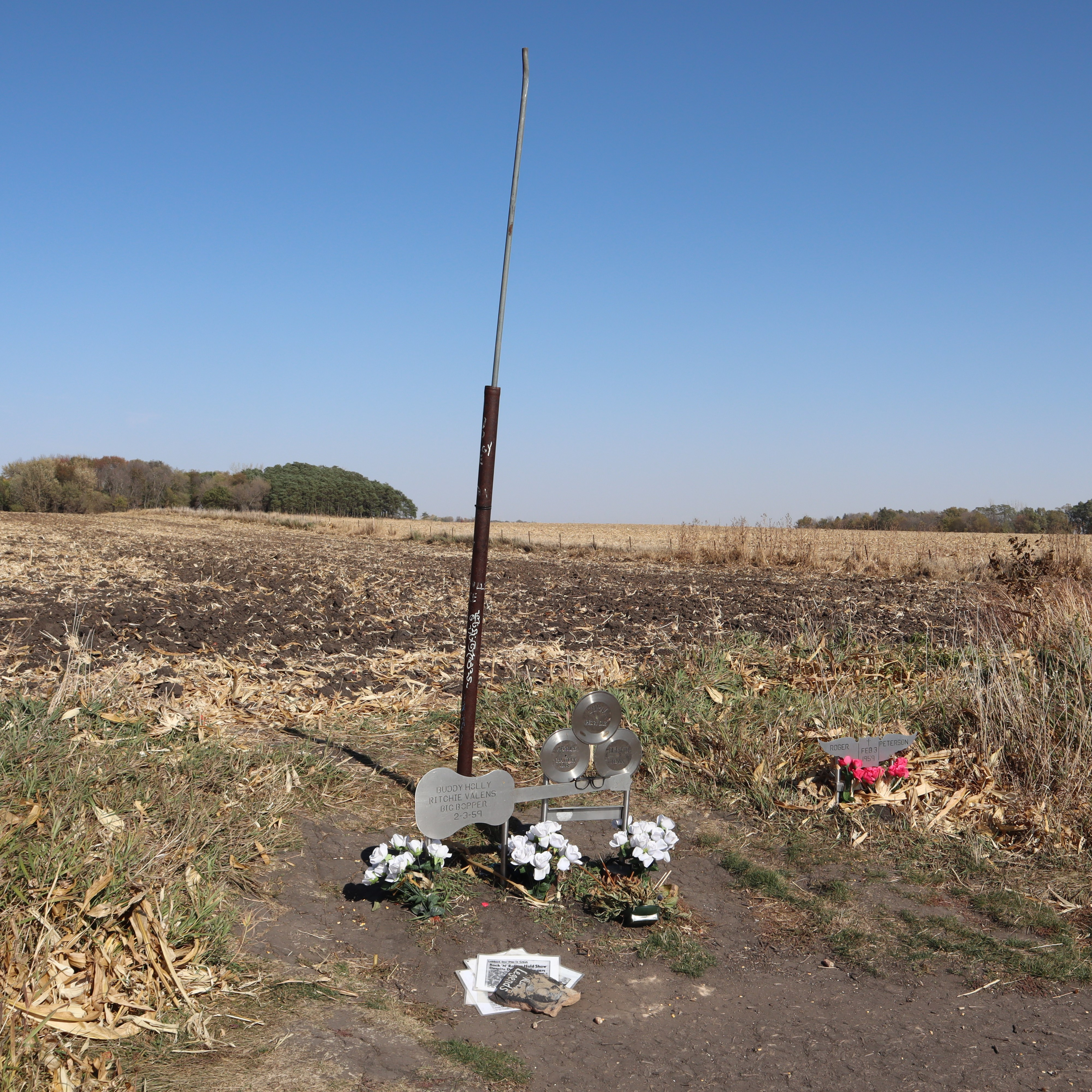
Memorial at crash site, 2024

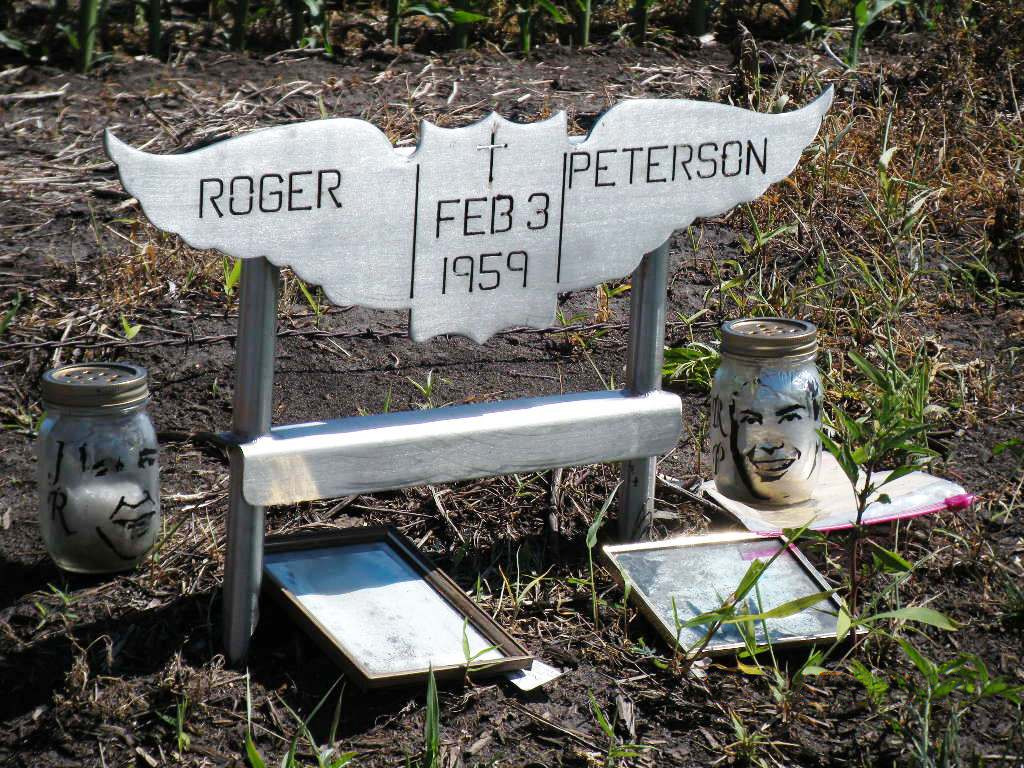
Memorial to pilot Roger Peterson at crash site

=== In popular culture ===
The accident closes the 1978 biographical film The Buddy Holly Story starring Gary Busey; the film ends as the Clear Lake concert concludes, and a freeze-frame shot is followed with a caption revealing their deaths later that night. The run-up to the accident and its aftermath are depicted in the 1987 Valens biopic La Bamba.

In the 5th episode of the 6th season of The Simpsons aired on October 9, 1994, "Sideshow Bob Roberts", the fictional graves of Holly, Valens, and Richardson are found and identified as deceased voters by Lisa and Bart Simpson at the Springfield Cemetery, as they investigate electoral fraud by Sideshow Bob. Meanwhile, on the 15th episode of the 14th season episode "C.E.D'oh" aired on March 16, 2003, the three entertainers appear as vampires on an episode of the fictional animated series The Itchy & Scratchy Show before the plane carrying them and Scratchy crashes. In the animated series The Venture Brothers, the villainous duo of Red Mantle and Dragoon are implied to be Holly and Richardson, with the crash being used as a cover up of their abduction and turn to life of crime.

In 1978, Waylon Jennings briefly added his own memories of the incident onto his song "A Long Time Ago", from the album I've Always Been Crazy. Jennings sings the lines "Don't ask me who I gave my seat to on that plane, I think you already know, I told you that a long time ago". In 1985, German punk rock band Die Ärzte released their second album Im Schatten der Ärzte, which includes the song "Buddy Holly's Brille". In their trademark humorous fashion, they address the accident by asking where Holly's glasses ended up. In 2006, Dion DiMucci recorded "Hug My Radiator" which references the "broken-down bus" and the chilling cold the performers experienced on the tour. The song does not directly reference the three performers who died, but DiMucci established the connection in an interview.

Howard Waldrop's short story "Save a Place in the Lifeboat for Me" collected in the 1986 book Howard Who? describes a fictional attempt by a sextet of famous slapstick characters (Chico and Harpo Marx, Abbott and Costello, and Laurel and Hardy) to prevent the accident from occurring. TJ Klune's 2020 fantasy novel The House in the Cerulean Sea features a character, Lucy, who collects records of Holly, the Big Bopper, and Valens, and discusses the crash with the protagonist, Linus.

== See also ==
- List of music group or artist fatalities from aviation accidents
- Continued VFR into IMC
