= María Elena Holly =

Puerto Rican businesswoman

- Born: María Elena Santiago; December 20, 1932 (age 93); San Juan, Puerto Rico
- Spouses: Buddy Holly (m. 1958; died 1959); Joe Diaz (m. 1963, divorced)
- Children: 3 (with Joe Diaz)

María Elena Holly (née Santiago; born December 20, 1932) is the widow of American rock and roll pioneer Buddy Holly. As a receptionist at Peermusic, she met with Holly and his band the Crickets on June 19, 1958, and Holly proposed to her after five hours on their first date. Less than two months later, the couple married on August 15, 1958, in Lubbock, Texas. On February 3, 1959, Buddy Holly died in a plane crash along with fellow musicians Ritchie Valens and Jiles Perry Richardson Jr. (The Big Bopper) outside Clear Lake, Iowa. After learning of her husband's death from the television news, she suffered a miscarriage the following day and could not attend Holly's funeral in Lubbock.

In 1963, María Elena Holly married Puerto Rican government official Joe Diaz, with whom she had three children. They eventually divorced. In the 1978 film The Buddy Holly Story, she is portrayed by actress Maria Richwine. As Buddy Holly's widow, she owns the rights to his name, image, trademarks, and other intellectual property. In 2010, Santiago-Holly co-founded The Buddy Holly Educational Foundation with Peter Bradley.

== Early life ==
María Elena Santiago was born in San Juan, Puerto Rico. Her mother died when she was six years old, and in 1953, her father sent her to live with her aunt, Provi Garcia, in New York City. Santiago worked as a receptionist for music publisher Peermusic.

== Marriage to Buddy Holly ==
As a receptionist at Peermusic, Maria Elena is believed to have met musician Buddy Holly in August 1957 when as rising stars he and the Crickets first visited Peer Southern Music in the Brill Building at 1619 Broadway to meet their publishing manager Murray Deutch, who was Maria's boss. On June 19, 1958, just before recording a cover of the Bobby Darin song "Early in the Morning" in New York's Pythian Temple, Holly asked her out on a date. Santiago had never been out on a date and told Holly she would have to ask her aunt for permission, which he received promptly. Five hours into their first date, Buddy handed a rose to Maria and asked her to marry him.

"One day this guy comes in through the door of PeerSouthern Music, where I was working as a receptionist, and I acted very reserved — 'Can I help you?' — and he was with the Crickets and said, 'Oh, we're not in a hurry,' and then turned to them and said, 'You know what? I'm going to marry that girl.'

— María Elena Santiago

On August 15, 1958, not two months after their first date, she married Holly at Tabernacle Baptist Church in his hometown of Lubbock, Texas. They settled down in Lubbock until Buddy broke up with the Crickets, and they moved to New York. Santiago-Holly went on one tour (October 1958) with her husband and took on promotional duties. Buddy Holly also formed the Maria Music publishing company with which "Stay Close to Me" was filed. Holly produced Lou Giordano's version of the song, which was issued on Brunswick 55115 on January 27, 1959.

According to Santiago, before she agreed to marry Holly, she insisted he resolve the issues he was having with his manager and producer, Norman Petty, who was in control of the Crickets' finances and allegedly withholding royalty payments. Santiago told Holly: "I don't want to sit around all the time, waiting for handouts from Norman Petty." Eventually, the two of them "visited Petty at the studio to end their partnership, and seek his unpaid royalties." Santiago "recounted that Petty told his young protege, "You know what, Buddy? I'm gonna say this to you. I'd rather see you dead than to give you the money now." Santiago also claimed that Petty "tried to break us up [...] He told Buddy not to marry me because I was a whoreish kind of woman, that I'd slept with all kinds of other men who'd come in to Peer-Southern. Buddy knew that wasn't true, of course. He got so mad, he wanted to leave Norman right there and then." According to Petty's recollection of the meeting, "Elena did all the talking. She said, 'Buddy and I have decided that Buddy can do better — that you're not fit for Buddy's manager.' And I said, 'What's this — is it something I've done?' She said, 'It's what you haven't done — you haven't done near enough for him.'"

In the early morning hours of February 3, 1959, Buddy Holly was on tour when he and fellow musicians Ritchie Valens and Jiles Perry Richardson Jr. (The Big Bopper) died in an airplane crash along with pilot Roger Peterson outside Clear Lake, Iowa. At the time, Holly and Santiago had been married for only five months, and she learned of his death from the reports on television. As a result of psychological trauma from the incident, Santiago miscarried with her husband's child on February 4. Her husband was interred in Lubbock.

Santiago-Holly did not attend the funeral and has never visited the grave site. In an interview with the Lubbock Avalanche-Journal, she later said, "In a way, I blame myself. I was not feeling well when he left. I was two weeks pregnant, and I wanted Buddy to stay with me, but he had scheduled that tour. It was the only time I wasn't with him. And I blame myself because I know that, if only I had gone along, Buddy never would have gotten into that airplane."

Following the miscarriage suffered by Santiago-Holly and the circumstances in which she was informed of his death, a policy was later adopted by authorities not to disclose victims' names until after their families have been informed.

== Later years ==
Santiago-Holly later married Joe Diaz, a Puerto Rican government official. Together, they had three children. Santiago-Holly and Diaz would eventually divorce, with Santiago-Holly claiming that Diaz never could accept that she always considered her first husband to be her true love. Santiago-Holly declared in 1993 that she would never remarry. In the present day, she is a grandmother living in Dallas, Texas, and promotes her first husband's legacy. In 1989, The Smithereens paid honor to her with the song "Maria Elena" on their album 11. Actress Maria Richwine played Santiago-Holly's role in the 1978 movie The Buddy Holly Story. Jill Hennessy portrayed her in the Broadway production of Buddy: The Buddy Holly Story.

In 1999, Santiago-Holly, along with Holly's siblings, filed a lawsuit against MCA, contending that the company was "defrauding them of royalties by using void contracts and forged signatures", had "grossly underpaid the fair market value of royalties" and had "stolen certain recordings and sold them." Santiago-Holly had raised concerns in the 1970s and 1980s "because the amount paid to her appeared "so miniscule [sic]" in comparison to what the market indicated they should be. However, she did not investigate based on her suspicions because she did not have the money to pursue the matter", and claimed that she "was ignored and stonewalled". The suit also named Joe B. Mauldin and Jerry Allison, Holly's bandmates in the Crickets, and accused them "of unjustified claims to royalty rights for recording sessions they didn't take part in", Norman Petty was alleged to have "conspired with MCA to defraud the Holly heirs." On 11 April 2007, "the parties came to an agreement regarding the amount of royalties due", with the court declaring that "MCA owed the Petty estate and the Holly heirs a combined $251,325 in additional royalties".

In 2008, Santiago-Holly threatened legal action against Peggy Sue Gerron, the subject of the song "Peggy Sue", after the publication of Gerron's autobiography Whatever Happened to Peggy Sue?

While visiting New York City in May 2008, Santiago-Holly visited Washington Square Park, where Holly often played his guitar. She observed musicians singing there, and later told the Avalanche-Journal: "I gave one musician $9 because 9 was Buddy's favorite number." She also visited the apartment building where she and Holly had lived. Santiago-Holly remarked it was the first time she had been back to the building since Holly's death.

Although she has stated that Holly was the love of her life, Santiago-Holly, as of 2019, does not plan to be buried next to him.

=== The Buddy Holly Educational Foundation ===
In 2010, Santiago-Holly co-founded, with Peter Bradley, the Buddy Holly Educational Foundation. The foundation is a charitable corporation whose mission is to keep Buddy Holly's legacy alive by providing musical education to new generations regardless of income, ethnicity or educational limitations. Among the areas in the musical education provided are songwriting, production, arranging, orchestration and performance education. The Buddy Holly Educational Foundation co-hosts worldwide songwriting retreats with Chris Difford. They are organized by Peter Bradley Jr, board Director of the Buddy Holly Educational Foundation.
