= Carl Bunch =

American drummer (1939–2011)

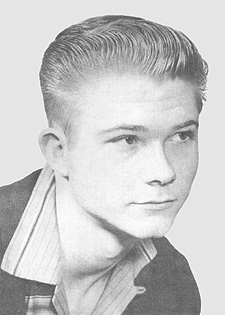
- Bunch in 1959
- Born: November 24, 1939; Big Spring, Texas, U.S.
- Died: March 26, 2011 (aged 71); Lancaster, California, U.S.
- Education: Friends International Christian University
- Occupation: Drummer
- Years active: 1955–2000
- Spouse: Dorothy
- Children: 3
- Musical career
- Genres: Rock and roll; rockabilly; pop; country; gospel
- Instruments: Drums; guitar; piano
- Formerly of: The Poor Boys
- Website: docbunch.com

Carl Bunch (November 24, 1939 – March 26, 2011) was an American musician and drummer best known for his brief stint as the drummer for Buddy Holly during the Winter Dance Party Tour in 1959. Bunch's time with Holly was cut short by Holly's sudden death in a plane crash on February 3, 1959, popularly referred to as The Day the Music Died. After Holly's death, Bunch enlisted in the United States Army before relaunching his music career with Hank Williams Jr. and Roy Orbison.

Bunch later retired and became a minister. Throughout the 2000s, Bunch attended various events that celebrated Buddy Holly and gave interviews about his experiences with Holly. After years of health issues stemming from his diabetes, Bunch died on March 26, 2011 at the age of 71.

== Early life ==
Carl Bunch was born in Big Spring, Texas on November 24, 1939. He was the first of two children, preceding his sister Kathy. Born prematurely, Bunch spent the first six months of his life recovering in the hospital.

While growing up in Odessa, Texas, Bunch was inspired by Donald O'Connor and took up dancing. Bunch and his sister traveled across West Texas to perform as a dance team. At the age of 13, Bunch had developed bone tumors in his right thigh, and later injured the leg after failing to do a proper flip. The tumors in Bunch's thigh significantly deteriorated the bones in his right leg, which complicated the injury. Bunch spent over a year in the hospital and had extensive surgery done to reconstruct the bones in his right leg. After spending three years recuperating from the operation, Bunch attempted to relaunch the dance team with his sister, but he was unable to perform as well as he had prior to the surgery.

At the age of 15, Bunch began playing the drums for five to eight hours each day to regain coordination in his feet. The following year, Bunch began his career as a drummer with The Poor Boys, a rock band local to Odessa.

== Buddy Holly ==
A concert poster for the Winter Dance Party Tour's January 25 stop in Mankato, Minnesota.

In November 1958, Buddy Holly split from The Crickets and their producer Norman Petty. According to Bunch, Holly first became aware of him after witnessing Bunch drum during a recording session for The Poor Boys. Recording under his own name in New York City, Holly recruited Bunch, Tommy Allsup, and Waylon Jennings as his backing band for the Winter Dance Party tour in 1959. Holly's band also backed other acts on the tour, including Ritchie Valens, "The Big Bopper" J. P. Richardson, Dion and the Belmonts, and Frankie Sardo.

Numerous logistical problems plagued the tour, as the distance between each show had not been considered when scheduling performances. After a show in Duluth, Minnesota on January 31, Bunch was hospitalized for severe frostbite to his feet due to the band's unheated tour bus breaking down in subzero temperatures near Ironwood, Michigan. Due to his condition, Bunch was forced to remain in Ironwood until he recovered. To fill Bunch's absence, Holly, Valens, and Dion took turns playing drums for each other at the performances in Green Bay, Wisconsin, and Clear Lake, Iowa.

Following the tour's performance at the Surf Ballroom, Holly, Valens, and Richardson boarded a Beechcraft Bonanza together with pilot Roger Peterson on February 3, 1959. En route to the next tour stop in Fargo, North Dakota, the plane subsequently crashed in a cornfield in Clear Lake, killing all four occupants instantly. Allsup, Jennings, and Dion all claimed to have narrowly avoided boarding the flight in place of Valens and Richardson.

=== Aftermath ===
Bunch recalled first learning of the crash from his mother, and later grieved with fans while lying in his hospital bed. Despite the tragedy, the Winter Dance Party tour continued. Musicians such as Bobby Vee, Frankie Avalon, Jimmy Clanton and Fabian were also recruited to help fill out the playbill. Jennings and Allsup carried on for the rest of the tour, with Bunch rejoining them in Sioux City, Iowa on February 5. The tour ended on February 15, 1959, in Springfield, Illinois.

== Later life and death ==
In 1959, Bunch enlisted in the United States Army. Bunch credited his time in the Army with helping him move on from the ill-fated tour. After his discharge from the Army, he spent some time playing for the Bob Osburn band, before moving to Nashville to play for Hank Williams Jr. and Roy Orbison.

In the 1970s, Bunch departed from the music industry and took on various jobs, including a stint as a security guard for televangelist Jim Bakker. In the mid-1980s, Bunch enrolled to Friends International Christian University and graduated with various theological degrees. After graduating, Bunch became an ordained Southern Baptist minister acting as a mental health therapist in California. In the 1990s, Bunch occasionally played country and gospel music in Los Angeles, no longer performing rock and roll as Bunch felt it was "too raunchy".

Bunch attended Buddy Holly related events during the late 1990s to early 2000s, signing autographs as "The Frostbitten Cricket" (using the term despite never having been a member of The Crickets). Bunch died on March 26, 2011 at the Antelope Valley Hospital in Lancaster, California, from complications stemming from diabetes at age 71. Bunch had been in ill health for decades, with a 1993 article from the Los Angeles Times describing him as "half-blind". At the time of his death, Bunch was survived by his wife Dorothy and their three children.

== Sources ==
- Carr, Joseph; Munde, Alan (1997). Prairie Nights to Neon Lights: The Story of Country Music in West Texas. Texas Tech University Press. ISBN 978-0-89672-365-8.
- Everitt, Rich (2004). Falling Stars: Air Crashes That Filled Rock and Roll Heaven. Harbor House. ISBN 978-1-891799-04-4.
