= Tommy Allsup =

American rockabilly and swing musician (1931–2017)

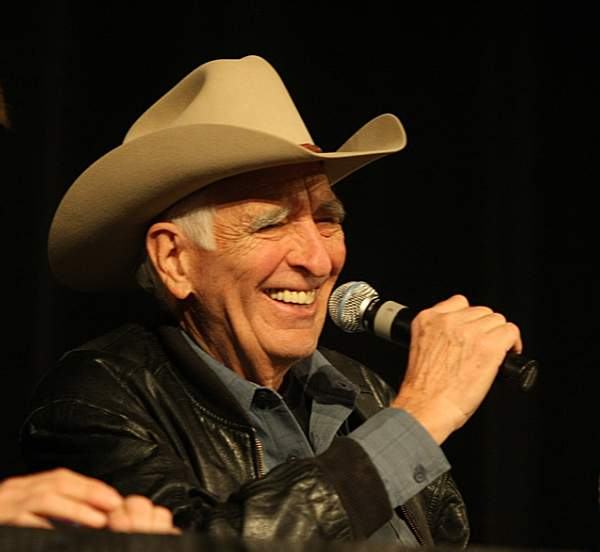
- Allsup in 2009

Background information
- Born: Thomas Douglas Allsup; November 24, 1931; Owasso, Oklahoma, U.S.
- Died: January 11, 2017 (aged 85) Springfield, Missouri, U.S.
- Genres: Rock and roll, western swing, country
- Occupations: Musician, producer
- Instrument: Guitar
- Years active: 1949–2016
- Label: Liberty
- Formerly of: Buddy Holly, Waylon Jennings

Thomas Douglas Allsup (November 24, 1931 – January 11, 2017) was an American country music, rockabilly and Western swing musician. He was an enrolled member of the Cherokee Nation.

With a career spanning over six decades, he most famously worked with entertainers such as Buddy Holly, including playing lead guitar on "It's So Easy!" and "Lonesome Tears", as well as playing with Bob Wills & His Texas Playboys. He was originally slated to be on the plane which crashed in 1959, dubbed “The Day The Music Died”, but gave up his seat to Ritchie Valens after losing a coin toss.

His guitar playing was featured on several popular American albums from the 1960s and 70s, including “The Gambler” and "Kenny" by Kenny Rogers. In 2000, he along with Floyd Domino, Larry Franklin, Vince Gill & Steve Wariner won the Grammy for Best Country Instrumental Performance for their work on Bob’s Breakdown by Asleep at the Wheel.

== Personal life ==
Allsup was born near Owasso, Oklahoma, in 1931, on his Cherokee mother’s allotment. Allsup was the second youngest among his 12 siblings. He first learned to play a fiddle with just one string on it, and sang in musicals at school. In 1942, his family moved to Claremore, Oklahoma. After high school, Allsup travelled playing music with other musicians around the U.S. Southwest, and also played in the historic Cain’s Ballroom in Tulsa. He later went to California to pursue music, and worked on an assembly line for General Motors while waiting for his Union membership. He was invited to play in a band with Jack Tucker, a musician in Southern California during the 1950s.

In 2002, he married Caren Clowson in Parker County, Texas. Allsup had a son, Austin, who is also a musician and competed as a contestant on the 11th season of The Voice. In 2025, Austin donated the microphone last used by Buddy Holly to the venue where their last concert was played, the Surf Ballroom in Clear Lake, Iowa.

== Career ==
In 1958, Allsup met Buddy Holly at the Norman Petty Studio in Clovis, New Mexico. Holly had heard and enjoyed Allsup’s guitar playing, and Allsup became the first musician to have recorded a guitar solo on a Buddy Holly record, “It’s So Easy.” Holly told Allsup that he couldn’t play his solo, and asked him to come on tour with him and his band, The Crickets.

After the band and Holly parted ways, Holly asked Allsup to tour with him on the Winter Dance Party tour; Holly’s band consisted of Allsup, Waylon Jennings (bass), and Carl Bunch (drums). While touring with Holly and fellow headliners Ritchie Valens, and J.P. "The Big Bopper" Richardson, he serendipitously lost a fateful coin toss with Valens for a seat on the plane that crashed. The disaster killed everyone on board: Valens, Holly, Richardson, and pilot Roger Peterson on February 3, 1959. Investigators initially thought that Allsup had died in the crash because he had given Holly his wallet so that Holly could use Allsup's ID to claim a mailed letter on his behalf, and the initial Associated Press reports stated that Allsup was among the deceased. He saved the coin that saved his life, and later gave it to his first wife, who had it repurposed and made into a belt buckle.

Allsup then moved to Los Angeles, played with local bands, and did session work, including songwriting credits for The Ventures "Bluer Than Blue", "Guitar Twist", and "Opus Twist". Allsup is known to be playing the lead guitar for these tunes on The Ventures albums The Colorful Ventures and Twist With The Ventures. Allsup played guitar on Bobby Vee recording sessions, including playing lead guitar on the album Bobby Vee Meets The Crickets. In 1964, he played guitar on the Buddy Holly tribute album The Buddy Holly Songbook produced by Norman Petty.

He returned to Odessa, Texas in 1965, where he worked with Ronnie Smith, Roy Orbison, and producer Willie Nelson. He was also producer on the futuristic, prophetic trans-Atlantic and Australasian hit "In the Year 2525" by one-hit-wonder Zager & Evans. Later in 1968, he moved to Nashville, where he did session work and produced Bob Wills' 24 Great Hits by Bob Wills and His Texas Playboys. In the mid-1970s Allsup served as the producer for a pair of Asleep at the Wheel albums.

In 1979, he started a club named Tommy's Heads Up Saloon in Fort Worth. The club was named for Allsup's coin toss with Valens 20 years beforehand.

The last surviving member of Buddy Holly's touring band for the 1959 Winter Dance Party, Tommy Allsup died on January 11, 2017, at 85 years old in a hospital in Springfield, Missouri, after complications from hernia surgery.

== See also ==
- The Day the Music Died
