= Jerry Dwyer =

American businessman and pilot (1930–2016)

- Born: October 11, 1930; Chicago, Illinois, US
- Died: January 16, 2016 (aged 85)
- Occupations: Businessman; aviator
- Known for: Founder of Dwyer Flying Service
- Spouse: Barbara Jean

Jerry Dwyer (October 11, 1930 – January 16, 2016) was an American businessman and aviator, best known as the founder of Dwyer Flying Service.

== Life ==
Jerry Dwyer was born on October 11, 1930, to parents Martin James and Martha Louise; he was the youngest of four children. He went to live with his grandparents James and Edna Rexroat. He lived near the Mattoon Airport and became interested in the aircraft there.

The owner of the airport would soon hire him for odd jobs such mowing the grass, and eventually taught him how to fly a plane. When he was 15 he bought an Aeronca Chief.

In 1949 Dwyer became a member of the Air National Guard. In 1952 Dwyer created Dwyer Aircraft, a small company based out of Oelwein.

Jerry would later become a businessman and later the owner of Dwyer Flying Service. In 1957 he started the first commuter service from Mason City to Minneapolis. Dwyer would soon gain a military contract with the US military going to paint the military aircraft, he also gained a pilots license to fly hazardous materials which led him to be a pilot for FedEx, UPS, and Airborne Express. He also had many pilots flying across Iowa, South Dakota, and Minnesota, later he expanded into the air charter business and founded Dwyair based out of Minnesota, which trained pilots.

In 2005 Dwyer had been inducted to the Iowa Aviation hall of fame after he'd clocked 40,000 flight hours. In 2008 he was awarded the Wright Brothers Master Pilot Award and the Charles Taylor Master Mechanic Award from the Federal Aviation Administration. After a battle with alzheimers he died on January 16, 2016.

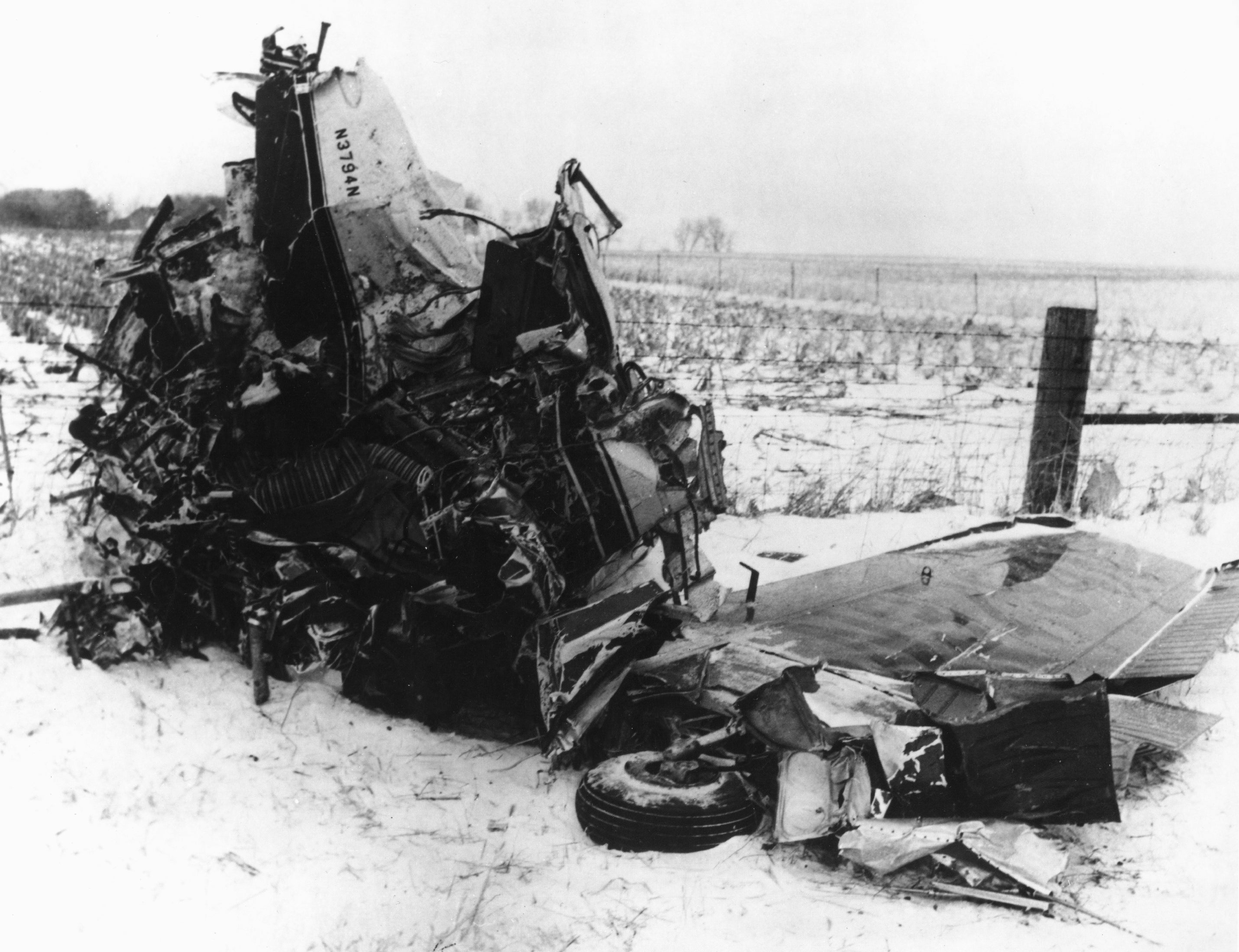
Wreckage of the aircraft

== The Day the Music Died ==
On February 3, 1959, an aircraft owned by Dwyer Flying Service crashed, and killed Buddy Holly along with three other people. This would forever haunt Dwyer.

== Ventures ==
- Dwyair
- Dwyer Aircraft
- Dywer Flying Service
