= The Crickets discography =

- Studio albums: 15
- EPs: 18
- Compilation albums: 20
- Singles: 32

This is the discography of American rock and roll band the Crickets.

== Albums ==
=== Studio albums ===
Title	Album details	Peak chart positions	
Title	Album details	US	UK
The "Chirping" Crickets	Released: November 27, 1957; Label: Brunswick; Formats: LP	—	5
Buddy Holly (Note: Buddy Holly was credited solely to Holly as his debut solo album. However, it features the Crickets as his backing group.)	Released: February 20, 1958; Label: Coral; Formats: LP	—	—
In Style with the Crickets	Released: December 5, 1960; Label: Coral; Formats: LP	—	13
Bobby Vee Meets the Crickets	Released: July 14, 1962; Label: Liberty; Formats: LP	42	2
Something Old, Something New, Something Blue, Somethin' Else	Released: December 1962; Label: Liberty; Formats: LP	—	—
California Sun / She Loves You	Released: February 1964; Label: Liberty; Formats: LP	—	—
Rockin' 50's Rock'n'Roll	Released: December 1970; Label: Barnaby; Formats: LP	—	—
Bubblegum, Bop, Ballad and Boogies	Released: April 1973; Label: Philips; Formats: LP	—	—
Remnants	Released: December 1973; Label: Vertigo; Formats: LP	—	—
A Long Way from Lubbock	Released: May 1974; Label: Mercury; Formats: LP	—	—
T Shirt	Released: September 1988; Label: Epic, CBS; Formats: CD, LP, MC	—	—
Double Exposure	Released: September 1993; Label: Rollercoaster; Formats: CD	—	—
Too Much Monday Morning	Released: March 1997; Label: Carlton Sounds; Formats: CD, MC	—	—
The Crickets & Their Buddies	Released: July 2004; Label: Sovereign Artists, Cooking Vinyl; Formats: CD, DVD	—	—
About Time Too!	Released: September 2005; Label: Rollercoaster; Formats: CD	—	—
"—" denotes releases that did not chart or were not released in that territory.

=== Compilation albums ===
Title	Album details	Peak chart positions			
Title	Album details	US	CAN	NZ	UK
The Buddy Holly Story	Released: February 28, 1959; Label: Coral; Formats: LP	67	—	—	2
A Collection	Released: June 1965; Label: Liberty; Formats: LP	—	—	—	—
Rock Reflections	Released: 1971; Label: Sunset; Formats: LP	—	—	—	—
Back in Style	Released: 1975; Label: MCA; Formats: LP	—	—	—	—
20 Golden Greats	Released: February 17, 1978; Label: MCA; Formats: LP, MC, 8-track	55	31	—	1
The Complete Crickets	Released: February 1984; Label: Charly; Formats: LP	—	—	—	—
File 1961–1965	Released: May 1987; Label: See for Miles; Formats: LP	—	—	—	—
The Best of the Crickets	Released: November 1989; Label: Liberty; Formats: CD, LP	—	—	—	—
The Liberty Years	Released: May 1991; Label: EMI/Liberty; Formats: CD, MC	—	—	—	—
Ravin' On – From California to Clovis	Released: 1991; Label: Rockstar; Formats: CD	—	—	—	—
Words of Love – 28 Classic Songs from Buddy Holly and the Crickets	Released: February 8, 1993; Label: MCA; Formats: CD, LP, MC	—	—	20	1
The Singles Collection 1957–1961	Released: May 1994; Label: Pickwick; Formats: CD	—	—	—	—
25 Greatest Hits	Released: July 6, 1998; Label: Music for Pleasure; Formats: CD	—	—	—	—
The Very Best of Buddy Holly and the Crickets	Released: August 16, 1999; Label: Universal Music TV; Formats: CD, MC; Expanded reissue in 2009	—	—	12	13
The Ultimate EP Collection	Released: September 2001; Label: See for Miles; Formats: 2xCD	—	—	—	—
The Complete Early Recordings	Released: October 2009; Label: ZYX Music; Formats: CD	—	—	—	—
Please Don't Ever Change 1961–1962	Released: July 8, 2016; Label: Jasmine; Formats: CD, digital download	—	—	—	—
The Crickets Story	Released: February 3, 2017; Label: Not Now Music; Formats: 2xCD	—	—	—	—
The Rough Guide to Buddy Holly & the Crickets	Released: February 24, 2017; Label: Music Rough Guides, World Music Network; Formats: LP, digital download	—	—	—	—
The Complete US & UK Singles As & Bs 1956–62	Released: February 9, 2018; Label: Acrobat Music; Formats: 2xCD	—	—	—	—
"—" denotes releases that did not chart or were not released in that territory.

== EPs ==
Title	EP details	Peak chart positions
Title	EP details	UK
The "Chirping" Crickets	Released: November 27, 1957; Label: Brunswick; Formats: 7"	—
The Sound of the Crickets	Released: December 1957; Label: Brunswick; Formats: 7"	—
The Sound of the Crickets	Released: September 1958; Label: Coral; Formats: 7"; UK-only release	—
It's So Easy	Released: January 1959; Label: Coral; Formats: 7"; UK-only release	18
The Crickets	Released: March 1960; Label: Coral; Formats: 7"; UK-only release	—
Four More	Released: May 1960; Label: Coral; Formats: 7"; UK-only release	7
That'll Be the Day	Released: November 1960; Label: Coral; Formats: 7"; UK-only release	—
The Crickets Don't Ever Change	Released: July 1962; Label: Coral; Formats: 7"; UK-only release	—
The Crickets	Released: 1963; Label: Coral; Formats: 7"	—
Just for Fun	Released: March 1963; Label: Liberty; Formats: 7"; UK-only release; split with Bobby Vee	1
Straight – No Strings!	Released: 1963; Label: Liberty; Formats: 7"; UK-only release	—
Come On	Released: August 1964; Label: Liberty; Formats: 7"; UK-only release	—
Buddy Holly: Crickets Hits	Released: 3 September 1976; Label: MCA; Formats: 7"; UK-only release	—
Buddy Holly Memorial Society	Released: 1979; Label: Buddy Holly Memorial Society; Formats: 7"	—
Million Dollar Movie	Released: March 1980; Label: Rollercoaster; Formats: 7"; UK-only release; split with solo Sonny Curtis	—
The Crickets	Released: April 1988; Label: Rollercoaster; Formats: 7"; UK-only release	—
Back Home in Tennessee	Released: 1990; Label: Rollercoaster; Formats: 7"; UK-only release	—
Go Boy Go!	Released: 1998; Label: Rollercoaster; Formats: 7"; UK-only release	—
"—" denotes releases that did not chart or were not released in that territory.

== Singles ==
Single (A-side / B-side) Both sides from same album except where indicated	Year	Peak chart positions							Album
Single (A-side / B-side) Both sides from same album except where indicated	Year	US	US R&B	AUS	CAN	IRE	NZ	UK	Album
"That'll Be the Day" b/w "I'm Looking for Someone to Love"	1957	1	2	2	2	—	—	1	The "Chirping" Crickets
"Oh, Boy!" b/w "Not Fade Away"	1957	10	13	4	6	—	—	3	The "Chirping" Crickets
"Maybe Baby" b/w "Tell Me How"	1958	17	4	16	9	—	—	4	The "Chirping" Crickets
"Think It Over" b/w "Fool's Paradise"	1958	27; 58	—	73	45	—	—	11	Non-album tracks
"It's So Easy!" b/w "Lonesome Tears"	1958	—	—	34	—	—	—	— (Note: "It's So Easy!" did not enter the now-official New Musical Express Top 30, but did peak at number 19 on the Record Mirror Top 20.)	Non-album tracks
"Love's Made a Fool of You" b/w "Someone, Someone" (Non-album track)	1959	—	—	—	—	—	—	26	In Style with the Crickets
"When You Ask About Love" b/w "Deborah"	1959	—	—	—	—	—	—	27	In Style with the Crickets
"More Than I Can Say" b/w "Baby My Heart"	1960	—	—	—	—	—	—	42; 33	In Style with the Crickets
"Don't Cha Know" b/w "Peggy Sue Got Married"	1960	—	—	—	—	—	—	—	Non-album tracks
"He's Old Enough to Know Better" b/w "I'm Feeling Better" (Non-album track)	1961	105	—	60	—	—	—	—	Something Old, Something New, Something Blue, Somethin' Else
"I Fought the Law" (UK-only release) b/w "A Sweet Love"	1961	—	—	—	—	—	—	—	In Style with the Crickets
"Don't Ever Change" b/w "I'm Not a Bad Guy" (Non-album track)	1962	—	—	98	—	9	8	5	Something Old, Something New, Something Blue, Somethin' Else
"Punish Her" (by Bobby Vee) b/w "Someday (When I'm Gone from You)" (by Bobby Vee and the Crickets; from Bobby Vee Meets the Crickets)	1962	20; 99	—	—	—	—	—	—	Non-album tracks
"I Believe in You" b/w "Parisian Girl" (from Something Old, Something New, Something Blue, Somethin' Else)	1962	—	—	—	—	—	—	—	Non-album tracks
"Little Hollywood Girl" b/w "Parisian Girl"	1962	—	—	76	—	—	—	—	Something Old, Something New, Something Blue, Somethin' Else
"My Little Girl" b/w "Teardrops Fall Like Rain"	1963	134	—	86	—	—	—	17	Non-album tracks
"Don't Try to Change Me" b/w "Lost and Alone" (UK-only release)	1963	—	—	—	—	—	—	37	Non-album tracks
"April Avenue" b/w "Don't Say You Love Me"	1963	—	—	—	—	—	—	—	Non-album tracks
"Right or Wrong" b/w "You Can't Be in Between" (from California Sun / She Loves You) (UK-only release)	1963	—	—	—	—	—	—	—	Non-album tracks
"Lonely Avenue" b/w "Playboy" (Non-album track)	1964	—	—	—	—	—	—	—	California Sun / She Loves You
"From Me to You" b/w "Please Please Me"	1964	—	—	—	—	—	—	—	California Sun / She Loves You
"You've Got Love" b/w "An Empty Cup" (UK-only release)	1964	—	—	—	—	—	—	40	Non-album tracks
"(They Call Her) La Bamba" b/w "All Over You"	1964	—	—	34	—	—	—	21	Non-album tracks
"I Think I've Caught the Blues" b/w "We've Gotta Get Together"	1964	—	—	—	—	—	—	—	Non-album tracks
"Now Hear This" b/w "Everybody's Got a Little Problem"	1965	—	—	—	—	—	—	—	Non-album tracks
"Million Dollar Movie" b/w "A Million Miles Apart"	1968	—	—	—	—	—	—	—	Non-album tracks
"True Love Ways" b/w "Rockin' 50's Rock and Roll"	1972	—	—	—	—	—	—	—	Rockin' 50's Rock'n'Roll
"My Rockin' Days" b/w "Lovesick Blues" (UK-only release)	1973	—	—	—	—	—	—	—	Bubblegum, Bop, Ballad and Boogies
"Wasn't It Nice in New York City" b/w "Hayride"	1973	—	—	—	—	—	—	—	Bubblegum, Bop, Ballad and Boogies
"Rhyme and Time" b/w "Ooh Las Vegas" (UK-only release)	1974	—	—	—	—	—	—	—	Remnants / A Long Way from Lubbock
"Rock Around with Ollie Vee" b/w "Cruise in It" (UK-only release)	1979	—	—	—	—	—	—	—	Non-album tracks
"T-Shirt" b/w "Holly Would"	1988	—	—	—	—	—	—	—	T-Shirt
"—" denotes releases that did not chart or were not released in that territory.

== See also ==
- Buddy Holly discography
