= Memorial Collection =

Compilation album by Buddy Holly
- Released: February 10, 2009
- Recorded: 1954 – January 20, 1959
- Genres: Rock and roll; pop
- Length: 126:21
- Labels: Decca; Geffen
- Producers: Owen Bradley, Norman Petty, Bob Thiele, Dick Jacobs, Andy McKaie

Buddy Holly chronology
Down the Line: Rarities (2009)	Memorial Collection (2009)	Not Fade Away: The Complete Studio Recordings And More (2009)

Professional ratings
Review scores
Source	Rating
Allmusic	5/5 stars
Blender	3/5 stars
Paste	(97/100)
Pitchfork Media	(7.7/10)
Rolling Stone	5/5 stars

Memorial Collection is a 2009 compilation album of American singer–songwriter and rock and roll pioneer Buddy Holly's master takes and hit singles, including some rare recordings. Along with Down the Line: Rarities, this album was released to commemorate the 50th anniversary of Holly's death (February 3, 1959).

== Reception ==
In an interview with the Lubbock Avalanche-Journal, Holly's eldest brother Larry Holley commented before hearing both this compilation and Down the Line: Rarities, "María [Elena Holly] told me I was definitely going to just break down and cry when I hear all these CDs, because they've cleaned them (the songs) all up and Buddy's music never has come across so pure before."

The critical reception for Memorial Collection was fairly positive. The Allmusic review by Stephen Thomas Erlewine compliments the collection's progression in Holly's work, while he says that several bootleg recordings, including a ten-disc collection, have more music. Robert Christgau, writing for Blender, thinks that the album could easily have fit on to two discs and says that the most interesting songs on the collection were the "undubbed" recordings. Ed Ward, writing for Paste, complimented Erick Labson's remastering, which he thinks made the recordings clearer than he's ever heard them. He feels that Buddy's New York City recordings produced by Dick Jacobs were the low part of the collection, but that Buddy's apartment tapes were much better. Stephen M. Deusner of Pitchfork Media feels that the Memorial Collection not completely needed most of the songs were already released on From the Master Tapes and Buddy Holly Collection, but he feels that the Memorial Collection still has several interesting tracks, like those with Bob Montgomery, and feels that the "undubbed" recordings add to the collection, but he feels that several of the "finished" recordings should have been included also. The Rolling Stone review of the album by Barry Walters gave a basic description of the album and summarizes Buddy Holly's career.

Memorial Collection generally got higher ratings from critics than Down the Line: Rarities.

== Track listing ==
Disc one
No.	Title	Writer(s)	Length
1.	"Down the Line" (Buddy & Bob) (undubbed)	Bob Montgomery, Norman Petty, Buddy Holly	2:03
2.	"Soft Place in My Heart" (Buddy & Bob) (undubbed)	Montgomery	2:16
3.	"You and I Are Through" (Buddy & Bob)	Montgomery	2:06
4.	"Midnight Shift"	Jimmy Ainsworth, Earl Lee	2:11
5.	"Love Me"	Sue Parrish, Holly	2:08
6.	"Don't Come Back Knockin'"	Parrish, Holly	2:15
7.	"Blue Days, Black Nights"	Ben Hall	2:05
8.	"Baby, Won't You Come Out Tonight"	Don Guess	1:57
9.	"I'm Gonna Set My Foot Down"	Holly	2:18
10.	"Changing All Those Changes"	Holly	1:41
11.	"Rock-a-Bye Rock"	Holly	2:23
12.	"Rock Around with Ollie Vee"	Sonny Curtis	2:13
13.	"Girl on My Mind"	Guess	2:18
14.	"Ting-A-Ling"	Nugetre	2:42
15.	"Modern Don Juan"	Guess, Jack Neal	2:41
16.	"Holly Hop" (undubbed)	Holly	1:39
17.	"Brown-Eyed Handsome Man" (undubbed)	Chuck Berry	2:04
18.	"That'll Be the Day"	Petty, Holly, Jerry Allison	2:17
19.	"I'm Looking for Someone to Love"	Holly, Petty	1:58
20.	"Mailman, Bring Me No More Blues"	Ruth Roberts, Bill Katz, Stanley Clayton	2:10
Total length:			43:25

Disc two
No.	Title	Writer(s)	Length
1.	"Words of Love"	Holly	1:55
2.	"Not Fade Away"	Charles Hardin [Holly], Petty	2:22
3.	"Everyday"	Hardin, Petty	2:09
4.	"Ready Teddy"	Robert Blackwell, John Marascalco	1:33
5.	"Tell Me How"	Hardin, Allison, Petty	2:00
6.	"Oh, Boy!"	Sunny West, Bill Tilghman, Petty	2:09
7.	"Listen to Me"	Hardin, Petty	2:22
8.	"Peggy Sue"	Allison, Petty, Holly	2:31
9.	"I'm Gonna Love You Too"	Joe Mauldin, Niki Sullivan, Petty	2:14
10.	"It's Too Late"	Chuck Willis	2:24
11.	"Maybe Baby"	Petty, Hardin	2:03
12.	"You've Got Love"	Johnny Wilson, Roy Orbison, Petty	2:08
13.	"Rock Me My Baby"	Susan Heather, Shorty Long	1:50
14.	"Look at Me"	Petty, Holly, Allison	2:07
15.	"You're So Square (Baby I Don't Care)"	Jerry Leiber, Mike Stoller	1:37
16.	"Little Baby"	Holly, Petty, C. W. Kendall	1:57
17.	"Rave On"	West, Tilghman, Petty	1:50
18.	"Well... All Right"	Petty, Holly, Allison, Mauldin	2:14
19.	"Take Your Time"	Petty, Holly	1:58
20.	"Fool's Paradise"	Sonny Le Claire, Horace Linsley, Petty	2:28
Total length:			41:51

Disc three
No.	Title	Writer(s)	Length
1.	"Think It Over"	Holly, Petty	1:48
2.	"Heartbeat"	Montgomery, Petty	2:09
3.	"It's So Easy"	Holly, Petty	2:11
4.	"Lonesome Tears"	Holly	1:48
5.	"Love's Made a Fool of You"	Holly, Montgomery	2:01
6.	"Wishing"	Holly, Montgomery	2:03
7.	"Early in the Morning"	Bobby Darin, Woody Harris	2:07
8.	"Now We're One"	Darin	2:06
9.	"Reminiscing"	King Curtis	2:00
10.	"True Love Ways"	Petty, Holly	2:50
11.	"It Doesn't Matter Anymore"	Paul Anka	2:04
12.	"Raining in My Heart"	Boudleaux Bryant, Felice Bryant	2:49
13.	"What to Do" (undubbed)	Holly	1:54
14.	"Peggy Sue Got Married" (undubbed)	Holly	1:50
15.	"That Makes It Tough" (undubbed)	Holly	2:17
16.	"Crying, Waiting, Hoping" (undubbed)	Holly	1:52
17.	"Learning the Game" (undubbed)	Holly	1:34
18.	"You're the One" (undubbed)	Holly, Waylon Jennings, Slim Corbin	1:31
19.	"Smokey Joe's Cafe" (undubbed)	Leiber, Stoller	2:16
20.	"Dearest" (undubbed)	Ellas McDaniel, Prentice Polk, Mickey Baker	1:51
Total length:			41:01

== Personnel ==
The following people contributed to Memorial Collection:

- Buddy Holly – vocals, guitar
- Bob Montgomery – vocals, guitar
- Larry Welborn – bass
- Jerry Allison – drums, percussion
- Sonny Curtis – fiddle on "Soft Place in My Heart", guitar
- Don Guess – bass
- Grady Martin – guitar
- Doug Kirkham – percussion
- Owen Bradley – producer
- Norman Petty – celeste on "Everyday", organ on "Take Your Time", producer
- Harold Bradley – guitar on "Modern Don Juan"
- Floyd Cramer – piano on "Modern Don Juan"
- Farris Coursey – drums on "Modern Don Juan"
- E. R. "Dutch" McMillin – alto saxophone on "Modern Don Juan"
- Niki Sullivan – background vocals, guitar
- June Clark – background vocals
- Gary Tollet – background vocals
- Ramona Tollet – background vocals
- Joe B. Mauldin – bass
- Vi Petty – piano
- Bill Pickering – background vocals
- John Pickering – background vocals
- Bob Lapham – background vocals
- C. W. Kendall Jr. – piano
- Bob Thiele – producer on "Rave On"
- Al Caiola – guitar
- Donald Arnone – guitar
- Bob Linville – background vocals
- Ray Bush – background vocals
- David Bigham – background vocals
- Tommy Allsup – guitar
- George Alwood – bass
- Bo Clarke – drums
- Al Chernet – guitar
- George Barnes – guitar
- Sanford Bloch – bass
- Ernest Hayes – piano
- Sam "The Man" Taylor – tenor saxophone
- Panama Francis – drums
- Philip Krous – drums
- Helen Way – background vocals
- Harriet Young – background vocals
- Maeretha Stewart – background vocals
- Theresa Merritt – background vocals
- Dick Jacobs – producer, orchestra director
- King Curtis – tenor saxophone on "Reminiscing"
- Abraham "Boomie" Richman – tenor saxophone on "True Love Ways"
- Waylon Jennings – handclaps on "You're the One"
- Ray "Slim" Corbin – handclaps on "You're the One"
- Andy McKaie – compilation producer
- Erick Labson – digital remastering

== Release details ==
Country	Date	Label	Format	Catalog number
United States	February 10, 2009	UMe, Geffen, Decca	CD	B0011337-02 (6 02517 72652 9)
