= Down the Line: Rarities =

Compilation album by Buddy Holly
- Released: January 27, 2009
- Recorded: 1949 – January 20, 1959
- Genre: Rock and roll
- Length: 120:55
- Labels: UMe, Geffen, Decca
- Producers: Norman Petty, Milton De Lugg, Andy McKaie (compilation)

Buddy Holly chronology
Not Fade Away (2008)	Down the Line: Rarities (2009)	Memorial Collection (2009)

Down the Line: Rarities is a 2009 compilation album of American singer–songwriter and rock and roll pioneer Buddy Holly's alternate takes and demos. It includes the original undubbed "garage tapes" with The Crickets and the "Apartment Tapes", which were recorded in the months before his death. Along with Memorial Collection, this album was released a week prior to the 50th anniversary of Holly's death (February 3, 1959) on January 27, 2009.

The compilation album chronicles Holly's journey from a 13-year-old novice (the album features his first recording, a cover of Hank Snow's "My Two-Timin' Woman") in Lubbock, Texas through to his early recordings with The Crickets and unsuccessful contract with Decca Records to his recordings in New York after signing with Coral Records.

== Track listing ==
Disc one
No.	Title	Writer(s)	Artist	Length
1.	"My Two-Timin' Woman"	Hank Snow		2:15
2.	"Footprints In the Snow"	traditional	Buddy & Bob	1:20
3.	"Flower of My Heart"	Don Guess, Bob Montgomery	Buddy & Bob	2:36
4.	"Door to My Heart"	Montgomery	Buddy & Bob	2:23
5.	"Soft Place In My Heart"	Montgomery	Buddy & Bob	2:16
6.	"Gotta Get You Near Me Blues"	Montgomery	Buddy & Bob	1:53
7.	"I Gambled My Heart"	Holly, Montgomery	Buddy & Bob	2:43
8.	"You and I Are Through"	Holly, Montgomery	Buddy & Bob	2:05
9.	"Down the Line"	Holly, Montgomery, Norman Petty	Buddy & Bob	2:03
10.	"Baby Let's Play House"	Arthur Gunter		2:28
11.	"Moonlight Baby (Baby, Wont You Come Out Tonight)"	Holly		1:58
12.	"I Guess I Was Just A Fool"	Holly		2:19
13.	"Don't Come Back Knockin'"	Holly, Parrish		2:00
14.	"Love Me"	Holly, Parrish		1:53
15.	"Gone"	Rogers	Buddy Holly & The Crickets	1:12
16.	"Gone" (alternate take)	Rogers	Buddy Holly & The Crickets	1:16
17.	"Have You Ever Been Lonely"	Brown, DeRose	Buddy Holly & The Crickets	0:53
18.	"Have You Ever Been Lonely" (alternate take)	Brown, DeRose	Buddy Holly & The Crickets	1:18
19.	"Brown Eyed Handsome Man"	Chuck Berry	Buddy Holly & The Crickets	2:08
20.	"Good Rockin' Tonight"	Roy Brown	Buddy Holly & The Crickets	1:57
21.	"Rip It Up"	Robert Blackwell, John Marascalco	Buddy Holly & The Crickets	1:25
22.	"Blue Monday"	Fats Domino, Dave Bartholomew	Buddy Holly & The Crickets	1:57
23.	"Honky Tonk"	Billy Butler, Bill Doggett, Clifford Scott, Shep Shepherd	Buddy Holly & The Crickets	3:26
24.	"Blue Suede Shoes"	Carl Perkins	Buddy Holly & The Crickets	1:52
25.	"Shake, Rattle and Roll"	Charles E. Calhoun	Buddy Holly & The Crickets	1:21
26.	"Bo Diddley"	Ellas McDaniel	Buddy Holly & The Crickets	2:20
27.	"Ain't Got No Home"	Henry	Buddy Holly & The Crickets	2:01
28.	"Holly Hop"	Holly	Buddy Holly & The Crickets	1:36
Total length:				54:54

Disc two
No.	Title	Writer(s)	Length
1.	"Last Night"	Mauldin, Petty	1:56
2.	"Not Fade Away" (partial alternate overdub)	Charles Hardin, Petty	2:23
3.	"Peggy Sue" (alternate take)	Jerry Allison, Holly, Petty	2:32
4.	"Oh, Boy!"	Sonny West, Bill Tilghman, Petty	2:09
5.	"That's My Desire" (two false starts and master)	Kresa, Loveday	4:11
6.	"Take Your Time" (false start and partially undubbed take)	Holly, Petty	3:32
7.	"Fool's Paradise" (alternate take)	Leglaire, Linsley, Petty	2:30
8.	"Fool's Paradise" (master)	Leglaire, Linsley, Petty	2:32
9.	"Fool's Paradise" (alternate take #2)	Leglaire, Linsley, Petty	2:33
10.	"Think It Over" (false start and rehearsal take - take 1)	Allison, Holly, Petty	2:13
11.	"Think It Over" (alternate take - take 2)	Allison, Holly, Petty	1:51
12.	"Think It Over" (master - take 3)	Allison, Holly, Petty	1:51
13.	"Love's Made A Fool of You"	Holly, Montgomery	2:04
14.	"That'll Be the Day" (greetings to Bob Thiele)	Holly, Allison, Petty	0:35
15.	"That'll Be the Day" (greetings to Murray Deutsch)	Holly, Allison, Petty	0:32
16.	"That's What They Say"	Holly	1:52
17.	"What to Do"	Holly	1:54
18.	"Peggy Sue Got Married"	Holly	1:50
19.	"That Makes It Tough"	Holly	2:17
20.	"Crying, Waiting, Hoping"	Holly	1:52
21.	"Learning the Game"	Holly	1:34
22.	"Wait Till the Sun Shines Nellie"	Sterling, Vontilzer	1:14
23.	"Slippin' and Slidin'" (slow version #1)	Edwin Bocage, Al Collins, Richard Penniman, James Smith	3:11
24.	"Slippin' and Slidin'" (slow version #2)	Bocage, Collins, Penniman, Smith	3:35
25.	"Slippin' and Slidin'" (fast version)	Bocage, Collins, Penniman, Smith	1:27
26.	"Buddy and Maria Elena Talking In Apartment"		3:28
27.	"Dearest" (fragment)	Baker, McDaniel, Polk	1:13
28.	"Dearest"	Baker, McDaniel, Polk	1:53
29.	"Untitled Instrumental"	Holly	1:20
30.	"Love Is Strange"	Baker, Smith	1:43
31.	"Smokey Joe's Cafe"	Jerry Leiber and Mike Stoller	2:14
Total length:			1:06:01

== Reception ==
Professional ratings
Review scores
Source	Rating
AllMusic	4/5 stars
Paste	(78/100)
Pitchfork	(7.0/10)

In an interview with the Lubbock Avalanche-Journal, Holly's eldest brother Larry Holley commented before hearing both this album and the Memorial Collection, "María [Elena Holly] told me I was definitely going to just break down and cry when I hear all these CDs, because they've cleaned them (the songs) all up and Buddy's music never has come across so pure before."

== Release details ==
Country	Date	Label	Format	Catalog number
United States	January 27, 2009	UMe, Geffen, Decca	CD	B0011675-02 (6 02517 79891 5)
