= Something Old, Something New, Something Blue, Somethin' Else =

Studio album by The Crickets
- Released: December 1962
- Genre: Rock and roll
- Label: Liberty LRP-3272
- Producer: Snuff Garrett

The Crickets chronology
Bobby Vee Meets the Crickets (1962)	Something Old, Something New, Something Blue, Somethin' Else (1962)	Just for Fun (1963)

Singles from Something Old, Something New, Something Blue, Somethin' Else
- 1. "He's Old Enough to Know Better (Jerry Allison) 2:23 b/w I'm Feeling Better (Robert Velline) 2:01" Released: Nov 1961; 2. "I Believe in You (Jefferies, Willet, Mallon) 2:17 b/w Parisian Girl (Sonny Curtis) 1:57" Released: Aug 1962; 3. "Little Hollywood Girl (Goffin, Keller) 2:08 b/w Parisian Girl (Sonny Curtis) 1:57" Released: Sep 1962

Something Old, Something New, Something Blue, Somethin' Else is a rock and roll album by the Crickets. It is The Crickets' third release following the departure and subsequent death of their front man, Buddy Holly. As the original cover indicates, the album contains versions of four old songs, four new songs, and four songs with variations of "blue" in the title.

Originally released as an LP record on in December 1962, the album was re-released on CD in 1994, with bonus tracks not featured on the original album and a new album cover. In the UK an EP titled Straight - No Strings! was issued on Liberty (LEP 2094) featuring four tracks from this album: "Willie and the Hand Jive", "Summertime Blues", "Searchin'" and "What'd I Say".

== Background ==
Following the band's successful collaboration with singer Bobby Vee, released earlier in 1962, singer, songwriter, and guitarist Sonny Curtis was able to rejoin the group. The band now consisted of guitarist Curtis, singer Jerry Naylor, pianist Glen Hardin, and original member and drummer Jerry Allison.

== Reception ==
Professional ratings
Review scores
Source	Rating
New Record Mirror	4/5 stars

Billboard called the album that "a fine outing for the boys by themselves, following their recent chart album entry with (Bobby) Vee," adding that "[t]he boys could go places with this strong wax."

== Reissues ==
The 1994 CD re-release includes bonus tracks culled from the 1971 compilation Rock Reflections. A streaming version available on platforms like Spotify resequences the albums' tracks and adds a 1960 version of "Love's Made a Fool of You", while versions of the album posted to YouTube anachronistically resequence the album according to the listing of songs on the album's cover.

== Track listing ==
Side one
No.	Title	Writer(s)	Length
1.	"Willie and the Hand Jive"	Johnny Otis	2:46
2.	"Don't Ever Change"	Gerry Goffin, Carole King	2:17
3.	"Summertime Blues"	Jerry Capehart, Eddie Cochran	1:53
4.	"Searchin'"	Jerry Leiber, Mike Stoller	2:56
5.	"Little Hollywood Girl"	Gerry Goffin, Jack Keller	2:08
6.	"Pretty Blue Eyes"	Teddy Randazzo, Bobby Weinstein	2:13

Side two
No.	Title	Writer(s)	Length
7.	"What'd I Say"	Ray Charles	2:37
8.	"Parisian Girl"	Sonny Curtis	2:00
9.	"Blue Blue Day"	Don Gibson	1:57
10.	"Love Is Strange"	Ethel Smith, Mickey Baker	2:35
11.	"He's Old Enough to Know Better"	Jerry Allison	1:55
12.	"Blue Monday"	Dave Bartholomew, Fats Domino	2:15

1994 CD bonus tracks
No.	Title	Writer(s)	Length
13.	"(They Call Her) La Bamba"	traditional arr. Jerry Allison, Buzz Cason	2:42
14.	"Lonely Avenue"	Doc Pomus	2:07
15.	"Teardrops Fall Like Rain"	Jerry Allison, Glen D. Hardin, Tom Lesslie	1:46
16.	"Thoughtless"	Jerry Naylor	1:45
17.	"My Little Girl"	Sonny Curtis	1:58
18.	"Playboy"	David Gates	2:04

Streaming Reissue track listing
No.	Title	Length
1.	"Parisian Girl"
2.	"Willie and the Hand Jive"
3.	"What'd I Say"
4.	"Blue Monday"
5.	"Summertime Blues"
6.	"Love Is Strange"
7.	"Searchin'"
8.	"Little Hollywood Girl"
9.	"Pretty Blue Eyes"
10.	"He's Old Enough To Know Better"
11.	"Blue Blue Day"
12.	"Don't Ever Change"
13.	"Love's Made a Fool of You"

== Personnel ==
Partial credits from the following sources.

The Crickets

- Jerry Allison – backing vocals, drums
- Sonny Curtis - vocals, guitar
- Glen D. Hardin - piano
- Jerry Naylor – lead vocals, guitar

Production staff

- Eddie Brackett - engineer
- Jim Economides - engineer
- Snuff Garrett - producer
