= In Style with the Crickets =

Studio album by The Crickets
- Released: December 5, 1960
- Recorded: 1958–1960
- Genre: Rock and roll
- Length: 26:11
- Label: Coral (CRL 57320/CRL 757320)
- Producer: Norman Petty, Jack Hansen under Bud Dani

The Crickets chronology
The Buddy Holly Story (1959)	In Style with the Crickets (1960)	Bobby Vee Meets the Crickets (1962)

In Style With the Crickets is a rock and roll album by the Crickets. Although it was the band's first release following the departure and subsequent death of their front man, Buddy Holly, it still contains many of the band's most memorable songs and many tracks have also been featured on numerous compilations over the years. Originally released as an LP record on December 5, 1960, the album remained out of print for some time until it was re-released on CD in 1993, with bonus tracks not featured on the original album.

== Background ==
This album is notably the Crickets' first album after the departure of frontman Buddy Holly in October 1958. The Crickets had previously recorded as the backing band on Holly's debut solo album, Buddy Holly released in February 1958. Recording of a formal follow-up to Crickets' acclaimed debut, The "Chirping" Crickets began in 1958 which led to the Crickets putting out a single on Brunswick records, "Love's Made a Fool of You" b/w/ "Someone, Someone". To replace Holly, a new vocalist, Earl Sinks, was brought in due to his similar singing style. On guitar, Holly's close friend and former bandmate Sonny Curtis joined, who also became a primary songwriter for the band. After a disagreement with the band, Sinks left before the record was released.

== Release and legacy ==
The album includes covers of "Rockin' Pneumonia and the Boogie Woogie Flu", "Great Balls of Fire" and "Ting-A-Ling. The album also includes many songs that would go on to be hits for other artists: "More Than I Can Say", made famous by Bobby Vee and Leo Sayer; and "Someone, Someone", made famous by Brian Poole & The Tremeloes. The Bobby Fuller Four were significantly influenced by this album, having some of their greatest hits come directly from this album: "I Fought the Law" and "Love's Made a Fool of You". The band also covered "Baby My Heart", which was released after the band broke up. Terry Manning and the Wild Ones recorded a cover of "Just This Once" and Matchbox released a cover of "Love's Made a Fool of You".

The most popular songs from the album itself are "Love's Made a Fool of You", "When You Ask About Love", "More Than I Can Say", and "Baby My Heart". While not popular in the U.S., they received significant airplay in the U.K. "I Fought the Law" became a popular song in the Crickets' repertoire for years to come.

The 1993 CD re-release includes outtakes from the Crickets' studio sessions surrounding the recording of the album. Included is "Someone, Someone", the B-side to the single "Love's Made a Fool of You", featured on the album. The songs off the single "Don't Cha Know" featuring vocalist David Box are also featured in these bonus tracks. The B-side, "Peggy Sue Got Married", is a cover of Buddy Holly's acoustic demo, which was never formally recorded by the band during his lifetime. The Crickets' recording features an instrumental similar to the original "Peggy Sue", and is noted for Box's vocals being very similar to Holly's.

Further reissues of the album were put out under various titles and labels, many composed of alternate takes of songs appearing on the album.

== Track listing ==
No.	Title	Writer(s)	Length
1.	"More Than I Can Say"	J.I. Allison, Sonny Curtis	2:38
2.	"Rockin' Pneumonia and the Boogie Woogie Flu"	Huey "Piano" Smith, John Vincent	1:59
3.	"Great Balls of Fire"	Otis Blackwell, Jack Hammer	1:53
4.	"Ting-A-Ling"	Ahmet Ertegun	2:37
5.	"Just This Once"	Curtis, Joe B. Mauldin, Earl Sinks	2:00
6.	"Deborah"	Allison, Curtis	2:16

Side two
No.	Title	Writer(s)	Length
7.	"Baby My Heart"	Curtis	2:15
8.	"When You Ask About Love"	Allison, Curtis	2:05
9.	"Time Will Tell"	Paul Gayten	2:12
10.	"A Sweet Love"	Curtis	2:04
11.	"I Fought the Law"	Curtis	2:12
12.	"Love's Made a Fool of You"	Buddy Holly, Bob Montgomery	2:00

CD re-release bonus tracks
No.	Title	Writer(s)	Length
13.	"Someone, Someone"	Edwin Greines, Vi Petty	2:46
14.	"Don't Cha Know"	David Box, Ernie Hall	2:07
15.	"Why Did You Leave?"	Robert Guidry	2:19
16.	"Smooth Guy"	Curtis	1:47
17.	"So You're in Love"	Allison, Curtis	2:37
18.	"Peggy Sue Got Married"	Holly	1:45

== Personnel ==
Although the front of the album sleeve only shows pictures of Joe Mauldin, Jerry Allison, and Sonny Curtis the line-up was as follows:

The Crickets

- Earl Sinks – lead vocals (2–6, 8–13, 15–17)
- Sonny Curtis – lead guitar (1–13, 15–17), lead vocals (1, 7)
- Joe B. Mauldin – double bass
- J.I. Allison – drums (all but 14), rhythm guitar (14)

Additional personnel

- David Box – lead guitar (14, 18), lead vocals (14, 18)
- Dudley Brooks – piano (1, 2, 3, 7, 17)
- Ernie Hall – drums (14)
- The Roses – backing vocals (12, 13)
- Tommy Allsup – rhythm guitar (1–5, 7–10)
- Vi Petty – piano (13)

== Charts ==
=== Album ===
Chart (1969)	Peak position
UK Album Charts	13
