= Matchbox discography =

- Studio albums: 11
- Live albums: 4
- Compilation albums: 9
- Singles: 23

This is the discography of British rockabilly band Matchbox.

== Albums ==
=== Studio albums ===
Title	Album details	Peak chart positions					Certifications
Title	Album details	UK	AUS	FIN	GER	NZ	Certifications
Riders in the Sky	Released: 1976; Label: Charly; Formats: LP, MC	—	—	—	—	—	
Settin' the Woods on Fire	Released: May 1978; Label: Charly; Formats: LP, MC	—	—	20	—	—	
Matchbox	Released: 12 October 1979; Label: Magnet; Formats: LP, MC; Released in North America as Rockabilly Rebel	44	32	2	—	26	AUS: Gold
Midnite Dynamos	Released: 26 September 1980; Label: Magnet; Formats: LP, MC	23	—	4	28	—	UK: Silver
Flying Colours	Released: 25 September 1981; Label: Magnet; Formats: LP, MC	—	—	20	—	—	
Crossed Line	Released: November 1982; Label: Magnet; Formats: LP, MC	—	—	—	—	—	
Going Down Town	Released: October 1985; Label: Magnum Force; Formats: LP	—	—	—	—	—	
Rock the Box	Released: 1990; Label: Welcome, Musidisc; Formats: CD, LP; As Graham Fenton's Matchbox	—	—	—	—	—	
I'm Coming Home	Released: 1990; Label: Welcome, Musidisc; Formats: CD, LP; As Graham Fenton's Matchbox	—	—	—	—	—	
Shades of Gene	Released: 1995; Label: Pollytone; Formats: CD; As Graham Fenton's Matchbox	—	—	—	—	—	
Comin' Home	Released: February 2006; Label: Vampirette; Formats: CD	—	—	—	—	—	
"—" denotes releases that did not chart or were not released in that territory.

=== Live albums ===
Title	Album details
'Live'	Released: September 1990; Label: Pollytone; Formats: CD, MC; As Graham Fenton's Matchbox
Live – Rockin' Bristol in 1978	Released: 7 December 2010; Label: Jungle; Formats: CD; Finland-only release
Access All Areas	Released: 29 June 2015; Label: Edsel; Formats: CD+DVD
Live – Rockin' Bristol in 2018 40 Years On	Released: 2019; Label: Killer Tone; Formats: CD+DVD

=== Compilation albums ===
Title	Album details	Peak chart positions
Title	Album details	ICE
Rokkað með Matchbox	Released: February 1982; Label: Magnet/Spor; Formats: LP; Iceland-only release	3
Rockabilly Rebels	Released: January 1993; Label: Magnet; Formats: LP, MC	—
All Time Hits	Released: 1994; Label: New Star; Canada-only release	—
Rockabilly Rebels	Released: April 2000; Label: Raucous; Collection of previously unreleased recordings; As Graham Fenton's Matchbox	—
Four Greatest Hits	Released: 2001; Label: Magnet; Formats: CD; Mini-album	—
26 Original Hits	Released: 2003; Label: Mach; Formats: CD	—
The Platinum Collection	Released: 5 December 2005; Label: Warner; Formats: CD	—
The Magnet Records Singles Collection	Released: 16 June 2014; Label: 7T's; Formats: 2xCD	—
The Albums 1979–82	Released: 31 January 2020; Label: Cherry Red; Formats: 4xCD box set	—
"—" denotes releases that did not chart or were not released in that territory.

== Singles ==
Title	Year	Peak chart positions										Album
Title	Year	UK	AUS	AUT	BEL (FL)	FIN	GER	IRE	NL	NZ	SWI	Album
"Rock 'n' Roll Band"	1975	—	—	—	—	—	—	—	—	—	—	Non-album singles
"Rock Rollin' Boogie"	1978	—	—	—	—	—	—	—	—	—	—	Non-album singles
"Black Slacks"	1979	—	—	—	—	—	—	—	—	—	—	Matchbox
"Rockabilly Rebel"	1979	18	12	12	—	3	17	21	—	1	9	Matchbox
"Buzz Buzz a Diddle It"	1979	22	—	17	7	17	45	—	6	37	—	Matchbox
"Palisades Park" (released under the name 'Cyclone')	1979	—	—	—	—	—	—	—	—	—	—	Non-album single
"Matchbox" (Germany-only release)	1980	—	—	—	—	—	—	—	—	—	—	Riders in the Sky
"Midnite Dynamos" /	1980	14	57	15	8	7	8	9	3	—	4	Midnite Dynamos
"Love Is Going Out of Fashion" (France A-side-only release)	1980	—	—	—	—	—	—	—	—	—	—	Matchbox
"When You Ask About Love"	1980	4	55	16	22	—	29	3	18	—	—	Midnite Dynamos
"Back Here in Boston" (France-only release)	1980	—	—	—	—	—	—	—	—	—	—	Midnite Dynamos
"Over the Rainbow/You Belong to Me" (medley)	1980	15	—	—	—	—	42	23	—	—	—	Non-album single
"Babe's in the Wood"	1981	46	—	—	25	—	44	—	41	—	—	Flying Colours
"Please Don't Touch"	1981	—	—	—	—	—	—	—	—	—	—	Riders in the Sky
"Only Wanna Rock" (Germany-only release)	1981	—	—	—	—	—	—	—	—	—	—	Riders in the Sky
"I'm a Lover Man" (Japan-only release)	1981	—	—	—	—	—	—	—	—	—	—	Midnite Dynamos (Japan release)
"Love's Made a Fool of You"	1981	63	—	—	—	13	66	—	40	—	—	Flying Colours
"Little Lonely Girl" (Japan-only release)	1981	—	—	—	—	—	—	—	—	—	—	Matchbox (Japan release)
"Angels on Sunday"	1981	—	86	—	—	—	—	—	—	—	—	Flying Colours
"24 Hours" (Germany-only release)	1982	—	—	—	—	—	—	—	—	—	—	Flying Colours
"One More Saturday Night"	1982	63	—	—	—	—	—	—	—	—	—	Crossed Line
"Riding the Night"	1982	—	—	—	—	—	—	—	—	—	—	Crossed Line
"I Want Out" (featuring Kirsty MacColl)	1983	137	—	—	—	—	58	—	—	—	—	Crossed Line
"—" denotes releases that did not chart or were not released in that territory.
