= A Collection (Crickets album) =

- Record cover

Compilation album by The Crickets
- Released: June 1965
- Recorded: 9 March (track 14) & 17 October 1962 (tracks 8-9); 3 April (12-13), 1 August (10-11) & 12 December 1963 (6-7); 23 March (1-2), 27 (4-5) & 28 (3) August 1964
- Studio: United (Hollywood, California); Pacific Enterprises (Hollywood, California); Radio Recorders (Hollywood, California); Western (Hollywood, California); Gold Star (Hollywood, California); Norman Petty Recording Studios (Clovis, New Mexico)
- Genre: Rock and roll
- Length: 29:29
- Label: Liberty LBY 1258
- Producer: Snuff Garrett, Buzz Cason

The Crickets chronology
California Sun / She Loves You (1964)	A Collection (1965)	Rockin' 50's Rock'n'Roll (1970)

Professional ratings
Review scores
Source	Rating
Record Mirror	4/5 stars

A Collection is a rock and roll compilation album by the Crickets, gathering singles recorded between 1962 and 1965 for Liberty Records.

Originally released as an LP record in the UK in June 1965, the album was re-released on CD in 1995 by BGO Records alongside the UK-only LP California Sun – She Loves You which compiled non-album singles.

The Crickets appeared in two jukebox musicals: the British movie Just for Fun (1963) in which they performed "My Little Girl" and "Teardrops Feel Like Rain", and The Girls on the Beach (1965) in America, where they performed "La Bamba".

== Track listing ==
Side one
No.	Title	Writer(s)	Length
1.	"La Bamba"	Traditional, arr. J. Allison	2:17
2.	"All Over You"	G. Robinson, N. Levenson	2:10
3.	"Everybody's Got A Little Problem"	Allison	1:45
4.	"I Think I've Caught The Blues"	Tommy Stewart	1:53
5.	"We Gotta Get Together"	Allison, Cason	2:18
6.	"Playboy"	David Gates	1:59
7.	"Lonely Avenue"	Doc Pomus	2:09

Side two
No.	Title	Writer(s)	Length
8.	"My Little Girl"	Sonny Curtis	1:59
9.	"Teardrops Fall Like Rain"	T. Lesslie, J. Allison, G. Hardin	1:47
10.	"Right Or Wrong"	Sheeley, DeShannon	2:09
11.	"You Can't Be In-Between"	Buzz Cason, Jerry Allison	2:10
12.	"Don't Try To Change Me"	Pomus, Ponci, Andreoli	2:07
13.	"Lost And Alone"	J. I. Allison, P. S. Allison	2:01
14.	"I'm Not A Bad Guy"	Jerry Allison	2:14

== Personnel ==
The Crickets

- Jerry Allison – drums, backing vocals, lead vocals (1, 3, 4, 5)
- Sonny Curtis – guitar, vocals
- Glen D. Hardin – piano
- Jerry Naylor – guitar, lead vocals

Additional personnel

- Glen Campbell – vocals track 14
- Ernie Freeman – arranger
- Buzz Cason – producer (tracks 1–7, 10–11)
- Snuff Garrett – producer (tracks 8–9, 12–14)
