= Just for Fun (EP) =

EP by Bobby Vee & The Crickets
- Released: April 1963
- Genre: Rock and roll
- Length: 8:24
- Label: London
- Producer: Snuff Garrett

Bobby Vee chronology
| The Night Has a Thousand Eyes (1963) | Just for Fun (1963) | Bobby Vee Meets the Ventures (1963) |

The Crickets chronology
| Something Old, Something New, Something Blue, Somethin' Else (1962) | Just for Fun (1963) | California Sun / She Loves You (1964) |

Just for Fun is a 1963 split EP by Bobby Vee and the Crickets, featuring the songs performed by the two acts in the musical film Just for Fun. released in 1963 only in The UK

The EP spent one week at number one in the UK EPs Chart, for the week ending 1 June 1963.

== Track listing ==
Side one – Bobby Vee

1. "The Night Has a Thousand Eyes"
2. "All You've Got to Do is Touch Me"

Side two – The Crickets

1. "My Little Girl"
2. "Teardrops Fall Like Rain"
