= She Loves You (disambiguation) =

"She Loves You" is a song by the Beatles.

She Loves You may also refer to:

- She Loves You (The Twilight Singers album)
- She Loves You (Yui album)
- She Loves You (Misato Watanabe album)
- California Sun / She Loves You, an album by the Crickets

== See also ==
- She Loves Me, a musical
