= California Sun / She Loves You =

Studio album by The Crickets
- Released: February 1964
- Genre: Rock and roll
- Length: 27:45
- Label: Liberty LRP-3351
- Producer: Buzz Cason

The Crickets chronology
Just for Fun (1963)	California Sun / She Loves You (1964)	A Collection (1965)

Singles from California Sun / She Loves You
- 1. "Lonely Avenue (Doc Pomus) 2:05 b/w You Can't Be In-Between (J. Allison, B. Cason) 2:08" Released: Jan 1964; 2. "From Me To You (Lennon-McCartney) 1:57 b/w Please Please Me (Lennon-McCartney)" Released: Feb 1964

California Sun / She Loves You is a rock and roll album by the Crickets, recorded during their time with Liberty Records. It is The Crickets' fourth and final album for Liberty following the departure and subsequent death of their front man, Buddy Holly. The album's title is somewhat confusing, as it follows the then-popular industry practice of filling the album cover with the titles of as many popular songs as possible. The record label simply lists "The Crickets" name.

Originally released as an LP record in February 1964, the album was re-released on CD in 1995 by BGO Records alongside the UK-only LP A Collection which compiled non-album singles.

== Background ==
Spurred by minor hit singles in 1963, "My Little Girl" and "Don't Ever Change", the Crickets next release sought to capitalize upon the rise of Beatlemania and the Beatles' vocal appreciation of the Crickets' records. The album contains five Lennon-McCartney songs and another song the Fab Four famously covered. Throughout this period The Crickets would enjoy greater popularity in the UK.

The Crickets appeared in two jukebox musicals: the British movie Just for Fun (1963) in which they performed "My Little Girl" and "Teardrops Feel Like Rain," and The Girls on the Beach (1965) in America, where they performed "La Bamba". The group was derailed in 1965 when vocalist Jerry Naylor suffered a near-fatal heart attack. By the later sixties, bassist Joe B. Mauldin ceased performing, while drummer J.I. Allison and Sonny Curtis continued as working in the music industry as session musicians, before reviving the group in 1968 and again in 1970.

== Track listing ==
Side one
No.	Title	Writer(s)	Length
1.	"I Want to Hold Your Hand"	John Lennon, Paul McCartney	2:17
2.	"California Sun"	Henry Glover	2:25
3.	"She Loves You"	John Lennon, Paul McCartney	2:23
4.	"A Fool Never Learns"	Sonny Curtis	2:12
5.	"Slippin' and Slidin'"	Albert Collins, Edwin Bocage, James Smith, Richard Penniman	2:27
6.	"I Saw Her Standing There"	John Lennon, Paul McCartney	2:55

Side two
No.	Title	Writer(s)	Length
7.	"Lonely Avenue"	Doc Pomus	2:05
8.	"Please, Please Me"	John Lennon, Paul McCartney	1:58
9.	"Money"	Berry Gordy, Janie Bradford	2:00
10.	"From Me to You"	John Lennon, Paul McCartney	1:57
11.	"You Can't Be In-Between"	Buzz Cason, Jerry Allison	2:08
12.	"Come On"	Dan Penn, Rick Hall	2:14

== Personnel ==
The Crickets

- Jerry Naylor – lead vocals
- Sonny Curtis — guitars, backing vocals, lead vocals (4)
- Glen D. Hardin — piano, clavinet, piano bass
- Jerry Allison – drums, backing vocals

Additional personnel

- Ernie Freeman - arranger
- Leon Russell - arranger
- "Bones" Howe - engineer
- Eddie Brackett - engineer
- Buzz Cason - producer
