= My Little Girl =

My Little Girl may refer to:

- My Little Girl (film), a 1986 American drama film directed by Connie Kaiserman
- "My Little Girl" (Crickets song), 1962
- "My Little Girl" (Roxy Music song), 1979
- "My Little Girl" (Tim McGraw song), 2006
