= Buddy Holly Center =

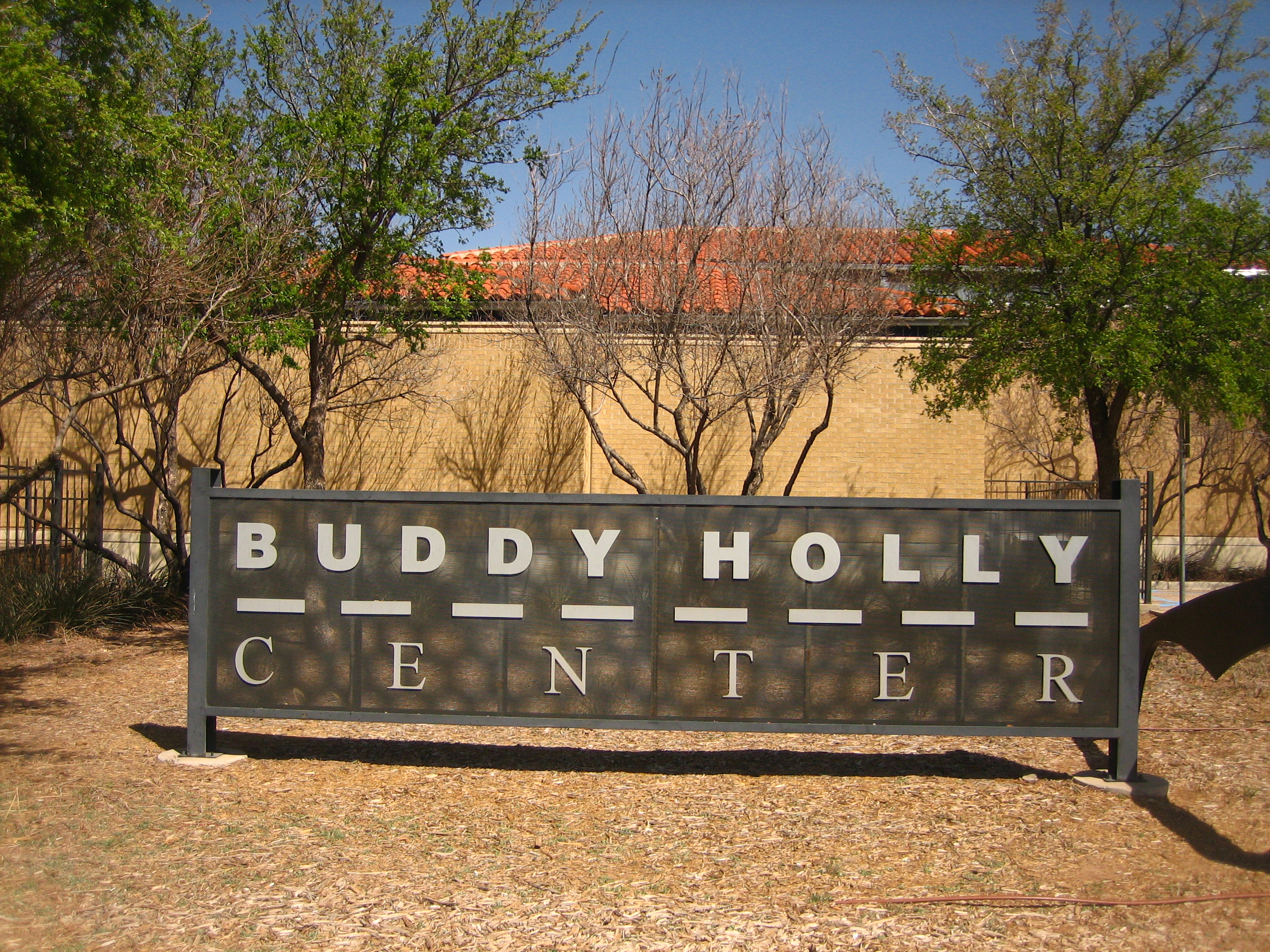
- Buddy Holly Center sign

- Location of the Buddy Holly Center in Texas Buddy Holly Center (the United States)
- Established: September 3, 1999
- Location: Lubbock, Texas
- Coordinates: 33.578564°N 101.842818°W
- Type: Music museum and art gallery
- Key holdings: Buddy Holly's Fender Stratocaster and horn-rimmed glasses
- Website: Official website

The Buddy Holly Center is a performance and visual arts center in Lubbock, Texas, dedicated to Buddy Holly as well as the music of Lubbock and West Texas more broadly. The building in which it is located opened as the city's Fort Worth and Denver South Plains Railway depot in 1928. In 1996, the City of Lubbock obtained a sizable collection of Holly-related artifacts from his estate, and the next year it purchased the former depot. In 1999, the new Buddy Holly Center opened as the home of the newly acquired Buddy Holly collection as well as a replacement for the city's Fine Arts Center, which had been established in 1984.

The Center features a permanent gallery for the Buddy Holly collection, which showcases artifacts and documents from Holly's childhood as well as his professional career, as well as the Texas Musician Hall of Fame, the Lubbock Fine Arts Gallery, and three additional visual arts galleries that host traveling exhibits. In 2002, an oversized sculpture of Holly's distinctive horn-rimmed glasses was installed outside the Center's main entrance, and in 2013 Crickets drummer Jerry Allison's restored house was relocated to the site and opened to the public.

== History ==
=== Building ===
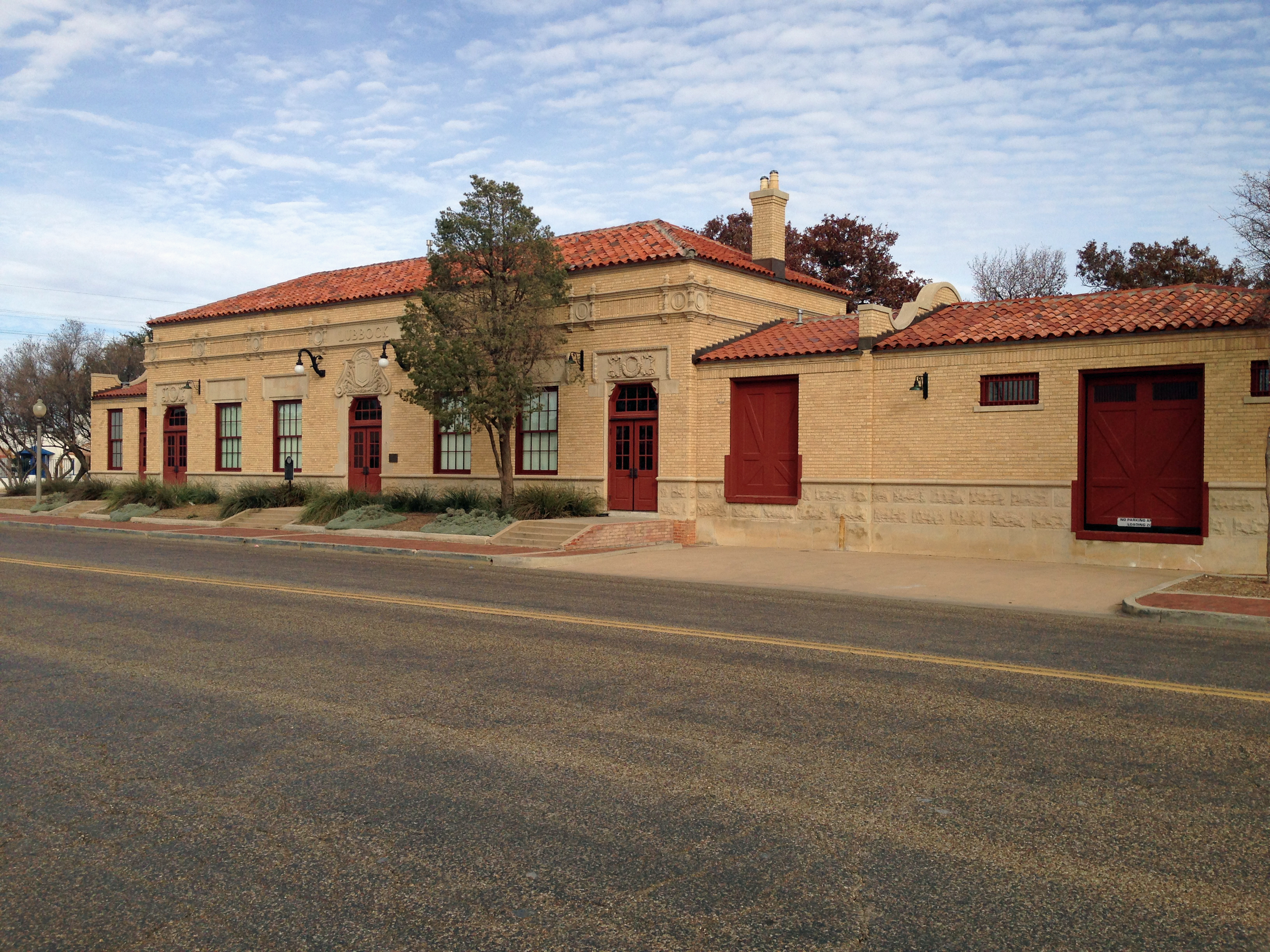
The Fort Worth and Denver South Plains Railway Depot building in 2013

The building in which the Buddy Holly Center is located opened as Lubbock's Fort Worth and Denver South Plains Railway depot in 1928. It was designed by Fort Worth-based architect Wyatt C. Hedrick in the Spanish Renaissance Revival style. The depot, which provided the city with both passenger and freight service, was the largest built on the Lubbock–Estelline branch of the Fort Worth and Denver, itself a subsidiary of the Burlington Route. It operated as a railroad station until 1953, when it was closed and subsequently used for salvaging and warehousing. In 1976, the building was reopened as the Depot Restaurant, which is regarded by the City of Lubbock as "one of the first successful examples of adaptive use in the city". In 1979, it became the first structure to be designated a Lubbock Historic Landmark by the Lubbock City Council, and it was added to the National Register of Historic Places in 1990. The restaurant closed in 1997, and later that year the city purchased the former depot.

=== Center ===
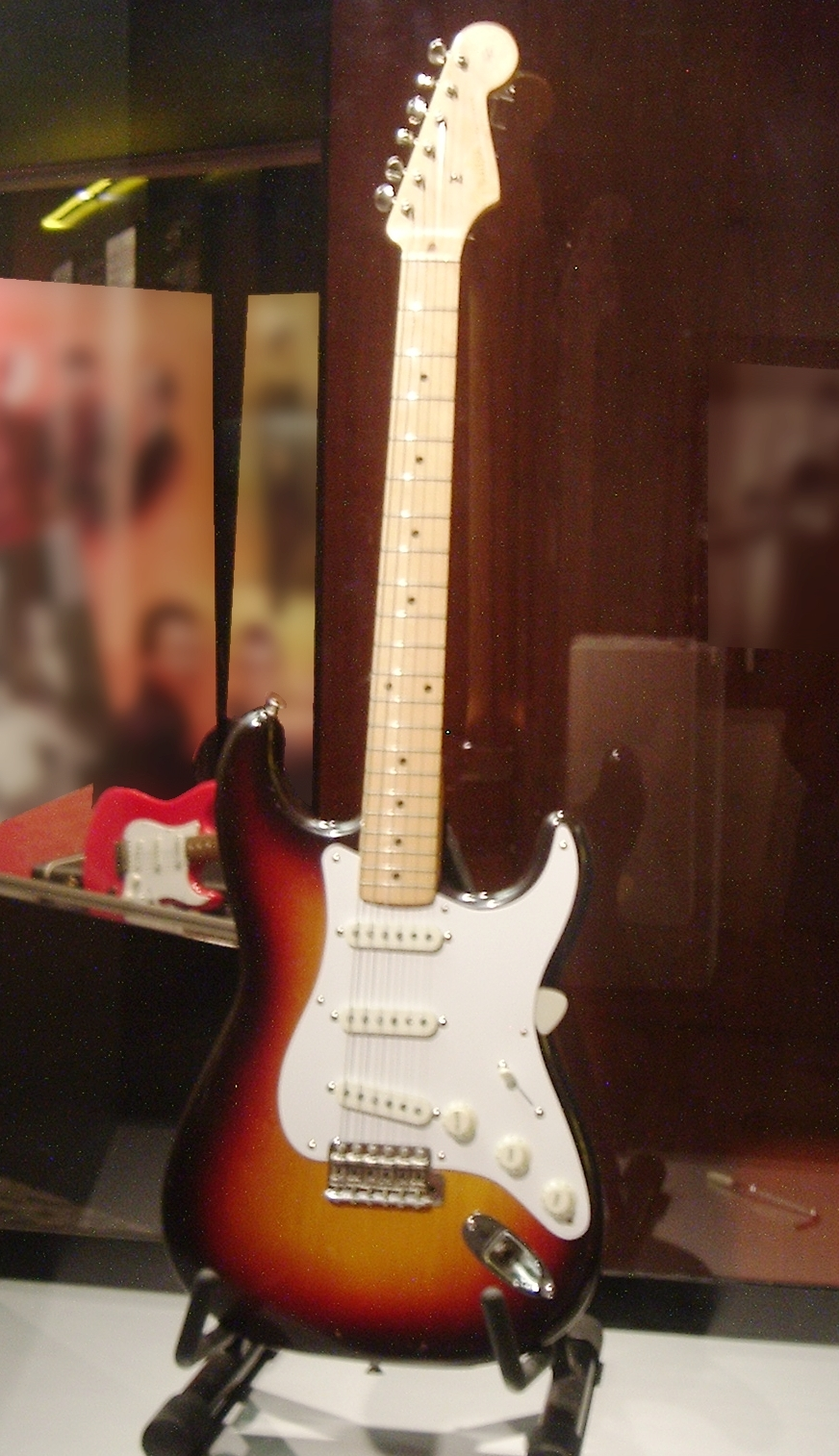
Holly's Fender Stratocaster on display

In 1984, the City of Lubbock established a Fine Arts Center; although it developed successful artistic and popular programs, it was housed in "an aging structure that was never intended for museum or gallery functions". In 1996, the city obtained a large number of Buddy Holly-related artifacts from his estate. The next year the city then purchased the recently closed Depot Restaurant, and began restoring, renovating, and expanding it into a facility that could both replace the Fine Arts Center and serve as a home for its newly acquired Buddy Holly collection. The original depot building was restored to its original specifications, and while the addition was largely built to match it, it also features a frieze with steel forms shaped like Holly's iconic Fender Stratocaster electric guitar.

The new Buddy Holly Center, envisioned as a municipal performance and visual arts center dedicated to Holly as well as the music of Lubbock and West Texas more broadly, opened on September 3, 1999, four days before Holly's birthday. The guitar-shaped permanent gallery of the Buddy Holly collection is featured alongside the Center's other attractions: the Texas Musician Hall of Fame (which often features temporary exhibits dedicated to West Texas musicians), the Lubbock Fine Arts Gallery, and three additional visual arts galleries that host traveling exhibits.

In May 2002, an oversized sculpture of Holly's distinctive horn-rimmed glasses created by Steve Teeters was installed next to the Center's main entrance. In 2010, the western wing of the Center underwent a major renovation that resulted in the replacement of doors and windows, the repointing of exterior bricks and stone, new flooring, lighting, and paint for the interior gallery space, the removal of freestanding exhibit walls, the addition of black-out shades to windows to protect artifacts from exposure to sunlight, and a new permanent education space.

Crickets drummer Jerry Allison's house, which had previously been restored and then relocated to the site of the Buddy Holly Center, opened to the public for the first time on September 7, 2013. The structure, which was where Allison and Holly wrote many of their songs, is available for tours.

== Collection ==
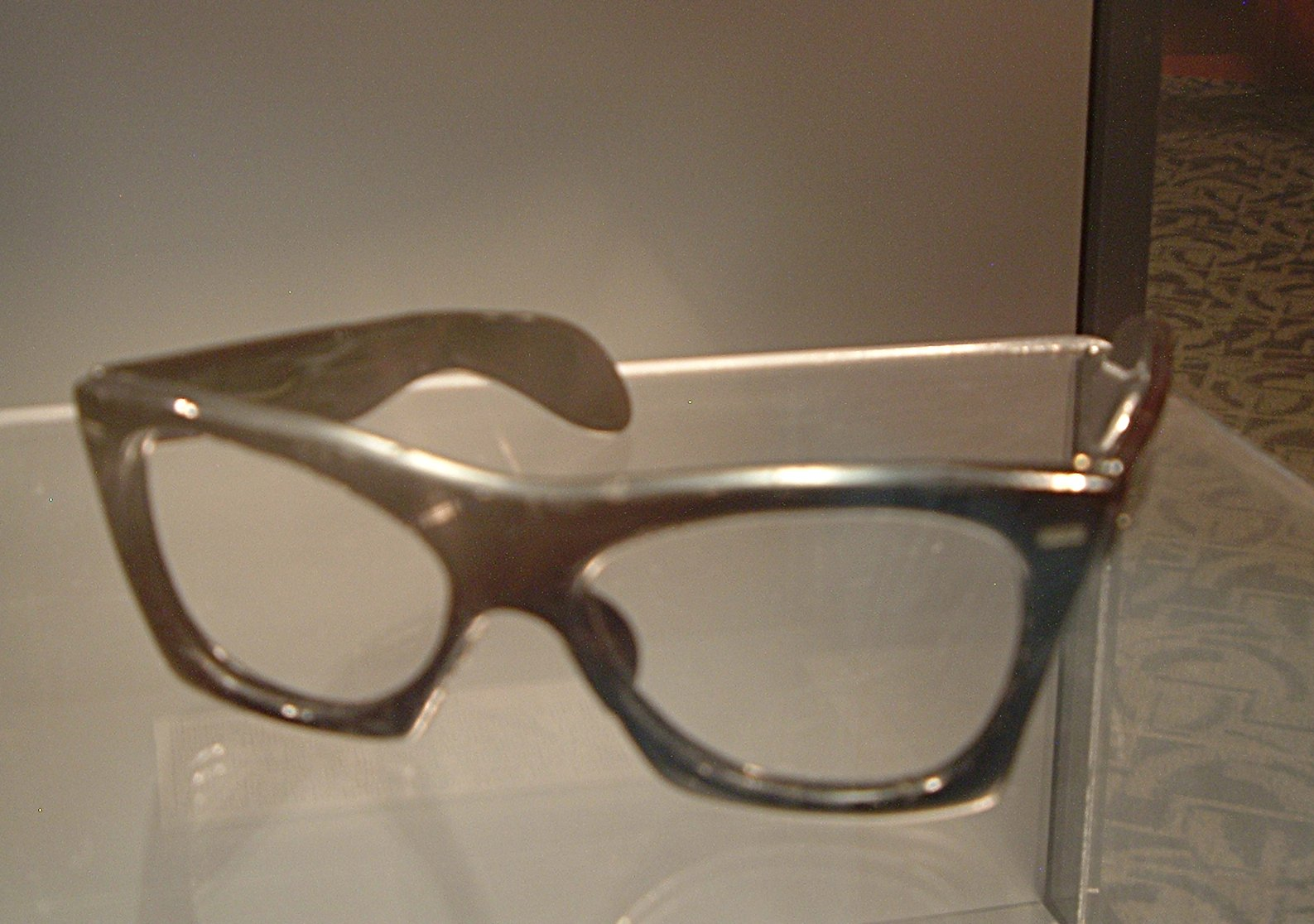
Buddy Holly's horn-rimmed glasses on display

The Buddy Holly Center's Buddy Holly collection, which the City of Lubbock acquired in 1996, is headlined by the Fender Stratocaster that Holly played during his final concert and the pair of glasses that he was wearing at the time of his death. It also includes numerous other artifacts from his career as a professional musician, including a recording microphone, performing outfits, a guitar strap customized by Holly himself, and numerous albums. Furthermore, the collection includes numerous photographs (both promotional and personal in nature) as well as documents, such as postcards, fan mail, original tour itineraries, and business cards. A handwritten letter from Holly to A.V. Bamford and correspondence with Decca Records are among the numerous letters in the collection. Various artifacts and documents from Holly's childhood, including homework assignments, a slingshot, a leather-crafting kit, and his personal collection of 45-rpm records are also on public display.

The Center also has Holly's 1958 Ariel Cyclone motorcycle on long-term loan from Lubbockite George McMahan; after Holly's death, the motorcycle was owned by country musicians Waylon Jennings and Jessi Colter before being sold at auction.

== Exhibits and events ==
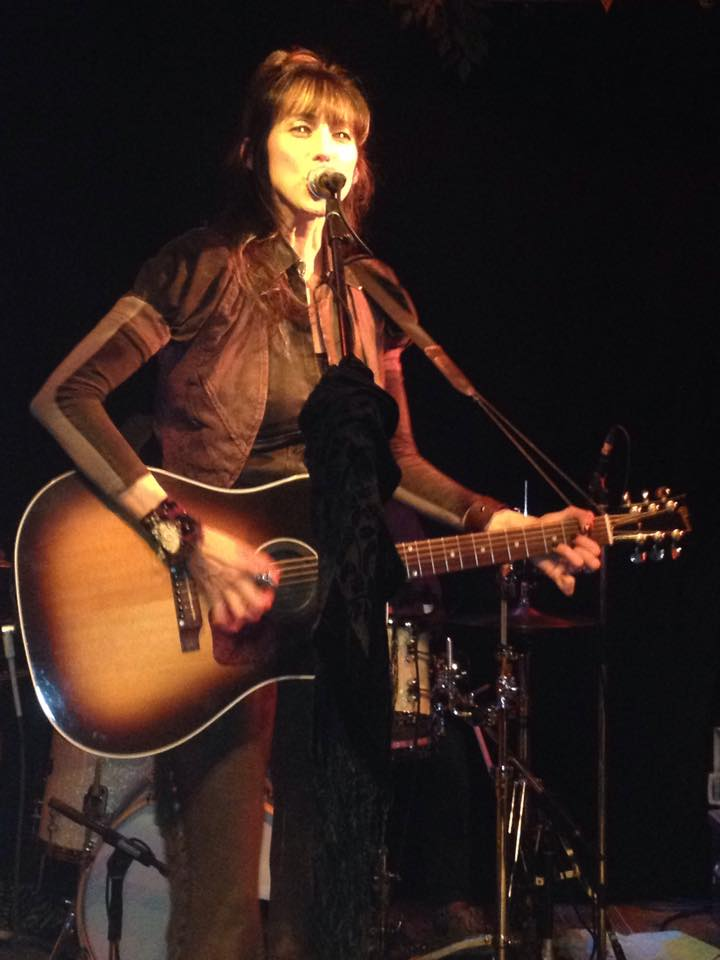
Patricia Vonne performed at the Center in August 2015

Temporary exhibits hosted by the Buddy Holly Center have included visual arts exhibitions showcasing subjects ranging from underwater photography to watercolors from children's literature.

In October 2014, Paul McCartney played a concert at the Center, during which he recounted Holly's musical influence on the Beatles. It also hosts an annual Summer Showcase Concert Series, which offers free performances in its Meadows Courtyard from May to August featuring bands of various musical genres, including rock, rhythm and blues, funk, soul, country, metal, and mariachi. In August 2015, Latin roots rock musician Patricia Vonne played a concert in the Meadows Courtyard.

The Buddy Holly Center offers free admission, as well as free trolley tours of various Holly-related sites in Lubbock, on February 3, "The Day the Music Died" (the day Holly was killed in an airplane crash along with Ritchie Valens and J.P. "The Big Bopper" Richardson). The Center has also waived admission fees for other occasions, including for its participation in the City of Lubbock's First Friday Art Trail (on multiple occasions, including in August 2011, May 2015, and August 2015), as well as on the occasion of its 15th anniversary in September 2014.

The Center has additionally hosted various other community events, including workshops on wire drawings, a Music, Art and Drama Camp open to children between the ages of 8 and 12, and various Day of the Dead events, including an art gallery, a family art workshop, and a concert by a Tejano band.

== See also ==
- List of music museums
