= Rockin' 50's Rock'n'Roll =

Studio album by The Crickets
- Released: December 1970
- Genre: Rock and roll
- Length: 25:18
- Label: Barnaby Records
- Producer: Delaney Bramlett (tracks 1–2); Jerry Allison, Sonny Curtis, Doug Gilmore (tracks 3–9)

The Crickets chronology
A Collection (1965)	Rockin' 50's Rock'n'Roll (1970)	Bubblegum, Bop, Ballad And Boogies (1973)

Singles from Rockin' 50's Rock'n'Roll
- 1. "True Love Ways" b/w "Rockin' 50's Rock'n'Roll" Released: April 1972

Rockin' 50's Rock'n'Roll is a rock and roll album by the Crickets. It was The Crickets' first release in the 1970s, and marked the band's embrace of their legacy as Buddy Holly's backing band. The album is a concept album of nostalgia for the 1950s, consisting mostly of songs written by Holly and framed by the new retrospectively-minded title track. The album was re-released on CD in 2000.

== Background ==
With the departure of bassist Joe B. Mauldin and singer Jerry Naylor, the latter embarking on a solo career, the Crickets seemed to be on hiatus after their few releases in 1965. The remaining members, guitarist Sonny Curtis and drummer Jerry Allison remained active in the music business. Billed as The Camps, Curtis recorded the novelty single "The Ballad of Batman" and "Batmobile," on the Parkway label in 1965. Allison and Curtis worked as session musicians, Allison toured with country singer Roger Miller for two years, and Curtis released two solo records on the Viva label. Keyboardist Glen D. Hardin joined Elvis Presley's TCB Band in 1970.

The August 1968 single, "Million Dollar Movie" (Curtis) and "A Million Miles Apart" (Glen D. Hardin), was the only Crickets release of new material since early 1965. The Crickets signed to Barnaby Records, a subsidiary of CBS Records founded by singer Andy Williams primarily to manage releases from the Cadence archive, the famed label of the Everly Brothers releases. (Williams had enjoyed success with Cricket Sonny Curtis' "A Fool Never Learns" and had recorded other Curtis songs including "Walk Right Back." Additionally, Williams-Price Agency managed The Mary Tyler Moore Show, for which Sonny Curtis penned the theme song "Love is All Around" in summer 1970.)

In 1970, Curtis and Allison sang backing vocals on Eric Clapton's first solo record, which was produced by Delaney Bramlett. Bramlett would produce the first two songs on Rockin' 50s Rock'n'Roll with Clapton playing lead guitar.

The album proceeds like a concept album with all of songs fading into one another, like the Beatles' 1967 album Sgt. Pepper's Lonely Hearts Club Band. The opening song "Rockin' 50s Rock'n'Roll" serves as an overture stating the album's theme of celebrating 1950s rock and roll music. It is reprised at the album's closing. Aside from the opening song, the album consists of new versions of songs made famous by former bandmember Buddy Holly.

In this way, the album tapped into an emerging trend in Western popular culture of the 1970s of nostalgia for the 1950s, in which figures like Buddy Holly were iconic.

== Sleeve ==
The album cover was designed by Bob Cato and Ira Friedlander. The rear of the record sleeve reprints a letter from the Beatles dated January 24, 1963 in full:

24th January, 1963.

Dear Crickets, When we were rehearsing for a T.V. Show the other day, we met someone who had known you during your recent trip to England, and they told us how you had complimented us. We also heard from E.M.I. in London that you had a copy of our record. Well, we'd just like to say that we take this as a great compliment and appreciate it very much. Yours sincerely,

"THE BEATLES."

== Track listing ==
Side one
No.	Title	Writer(s)	Length
1.	"Rockin' 50's Rock 'n' Roll"	J.I. Allison, Sonny Curtis, Doug Gilmore	2:20
2.	"That'll Be the Day"	Jerry Allison, Buddy Holly, Norman Petty	2:12
3.	"True Love Ways"	Buddy Holly, Norman Petty	3:10
4.	"Well...All Right"	Buddy Holly, Norman Petty, Joe B. Mauldin	2:19
5.	"Peggy Sue"	Jerry Allison, Norman Petty	2:19

Side two
No.	Title	Writer(s)	Length
6.	"Oh Boy"	Sonny West, B. Tilghman, Norman Petty	2:12
7.	"Raining in My Heart"	Boudeleau Bryant, Felice Bryant	2:43
8.	"It's So Easy"	Buddy Holly, Norman Petty	1:40
9.	"Medley: Everyday / Think It Over / Maybe Baby"	Buddy Holly, Norman Petty	2:25

== Personnel ==
The Crickets

- Jerry Allison – drums, lead vocals (track 2), co-producer (tracks 3–9)
- Sonny Curtis – guitar, lead vocals (track 1, 3–9), co-producer (tracks 3–9)
- Glen D. Hardin – piano, keyboards, arranger

Additional personnel

- Doug Gilmore – co-producer (tracks 3–9)
- Eric Clapton – lead guitar (tracks 1–2)
- Delaney Bramlett – producer (tracks 1–2).
- Richie Moore – engineer (tracks 1,2)
- Bob Cato – design
- Ira Friedlander – design
- CBS Records – distributed By
- Albert Hall Productions - produced for

== Reception ==
Billboard called the album "[a] must for those who remember (the early fifties) and those who wish they could." Critic Bruce Eder called it "[n]ot a bad little album in its time" and added that "[t]here are pleasant surprises found throughout, both in the singing and the playing."
