= Someone, Someone =

1959 song by the Crickets

Single by The Crickets
- A-side: "Love's Made a Fool of You"
- Released: March 1959
- Recorded: November 21, 1958
- Studio: Norman Petty Recording Studios, Clovis, New Mexico
- Genre: Pop
- Length: 2:46
- Label: Brunswick
- Songwriter(s): Violet Ann Petty; Edwin Greines
- Producer(s): Norman Petty

The Crickets singles chronology
"It's So Easy!" / "Lonesome Tears" (1958)	"Love's Made a Fool of You" / "Someone, Someone" (1959)	"When You Ask About Love" / "Deborah" (1959)

"Someone, Someone" is a song by American rock and roll band the Crickets, released in March 1959 as the B-side to "Love's Made a Fool of You". However, the song is better known for the version by British beat group Brian Poole and the Tremeloes, which became a top-ten hit in the UK in 1964.

== Background and release ==
"Someone, Someone" was written by Violet Ann "Vi" Petty, wife of the Crickets' producer Norman Petty, and Edwin Greines, who had previously co-written "Mr. Success", a hit for Frank Sinatra in 1958. It was recorded by the Crickets in their second recording session following the departure of Buddy Holly. The recording took place in November 1958 at Norman Petty's Recording Studios in Clovis, New Mexico, and featured two new members: lead vocalist Earl Sinks and guitarist Sonny Curtis. Vi Petty also featured playing piano, and the backing vocals were provided by the Roses. "Someone, Someone" was released in March 1959 as the B-side to "Love's Made a Fool of You", which failed to chart in the US, though it was a top forty hit in the UK, peaking at number 26. Reviewed in Billboard, "Someone, Someone" was described as having a "soft chant on a pounding ballad with beat… [with] danceable rhythm and good vocal".

== Personnel ==
- Earl Sinks – lead vocals
- Sonny Curtis – guitar
- Joe Mauldin – bass
- Jerry Allison – drums
- Violet Ann Petty – piano
- The Roses (Robert Linville, Ray Rush, David Bingham) – backing vocals

== Brian Poole and the Tremeloes version ==
"Someone, Someone"

Single by Brian Poole and the Tremeloes

from the album It's About Time
- B-side: "Till the End of Time"
- Released: 1 May 1964
- Recorded: 8 March 1964
- Studio: Decca Studios, London
- Genre: Pop
- Length: 2:55
- Label: Decca
- Songwriter(s): Violet Ann Petty; Edwin Greines
- Producer(s): Mike Smith

Brian Poole and the Tremeloes singles chronology
"Candy Man" (1964)	"Someone, Someone" (1964)	"Twelve Steps to Love" (1964)

=== Recording and release ===
Brian Poole and the Tremeloes had been in contact with Norman Petty since the late 1950s and he sent the group a number of songs, including "Someone, Someone". Petty was present at the recording at Decca Studios and insisted that the song had to be sung "softly and with feeling". However, the group had recently been on tour, with lead singer Brian Poole saying that "soft singing had kind of rasped out a little". In order to counter this, Petty got Poole to sing whilst lying down in the recording booth, causing everyone to start laughing. However, the recording was successful and it was later released as a single in May 1964 with the B-side, "Till the End of Time", written by Poole and guitarist Alan Blakley. "Someone, Someone" represented a divergence from their previous beat songs like "Do You Love Me" and "Candy Man", instead showcasing a pop ballad style, with Poole saying at the time that "it's given us a great kick to do a number like this, just for contrast, but we'll probably be back to the uptempo stuff next time". It became the group's fourth and final UK top-ten hit, peaking at number 2 on the four major music paper charts at the time, and their only to make the US charts, before the departure of Brian Poole in 1966. "Someone, Someone" sold over 250,000 copies and was awarded a silver disc by Disc. The song was later included on the group's album It's About Time, released in April 1965.

=== Reception ===
Reviewing for Disc, Don Nicholl wrote that "Brian sings "Someone, Someone" with a soft wistful manner that is very appealing. A definite contrast to their previous beat work this half could be a top seller. Group echo his words tenderly and the guitar backing is class, simple". In Record Mirror, the reviewer wrote that "It grows and grows... pleasant tune, good singing, nice "answer" bits from the group".

=== Charts ===
Chart (1964)	Peak position
Australia (Kent Music Report)	17
Australia (Music Maker, Sydney)	4
Canada (Vancouver CFUN)	8
Hong Kong	1
Ireland (IRMA)	2
New Zealand (Lever Hit Parade)	5
Norway (VG-lista)	5
Sweden (Tio i Topp)	2
UK Disc Top 30	2
UK Melody Maker Top 50	2
UK New Musical Express Top 30	2
UK Record Retailer Top 50	2
US Billboard Hot 100	97
US Cash Box Top 100	64

=== Personnel ===
- Brian Poole – lead vocals
- Rick Westwood – lead guitar
- Alan Blakley – rhythm guitar (died 1996)
- Alan Howard – bass guitar
- Dave Munden – drums (died 2020)
