= White Lightnin' Road =

1967 film by Ron Ormond

- Theatrical release poster
- Directed by: Ron Ormond
- Written by: Ron Ormond
- Produced by: Ron Ormond; June Carr Ormond
- Starring: Arline Hunter; Ter'l Bennett; Earl "Snake" Richards
- Cinematography: Jack Steely
- Production company: J.R.T. Films
- Release date: February 24, 1967
- Running time: 95 minutes
- Country: United States
- Language: English

White Lightnin' Road is a 1967 American independent romantic drama crime film written and directed by Ron Ormond and starring Arline Hunter.

== Synopsis ==
Snake is a low-down cheating rural stock-car race driver who works for Slick – a gangster running a crooked auto parts syndicate – and makes life hell for his rival Joe.

== Release ==
In 2023, Powerhouse Films released a remastered version of the film on Blu-ray as part of a box-set on the filmography of the Ormond family.
