= Earl Sinks =

American singer (1940–2017)

- Also known as: Earl Henry, Sinks Mitchell, Earl Richards, Snake Richards, Sinx Mitchell
- Born: Henry Earl Sinks; January 1, 1940; Whitharral, Texas, U.S.
- Origin: Amarillo, Texas
- Died: May 13, 2017 (aged 77) Goodlettsville, Tennessee, U.S.
- Genres: Rock and roll, Rhythm and blues, country
- Occupations: Singer, musician
- Instruments: Vocals, guitar
- Years active: 1957–1990s
- Labels: Ace of Hearts, Brunswick, Capitol, Coral, Decca, Dot, Hickory, United Artists, Warner Bros.
- Spouse: Rita Faye

Henry Earl Sinks (January 1, 1940 – May 13, 2017), known professionally as Earl Sinks, was an American rock and roll singer-songwriter and actor. Sinks' career in music and acting spanned the 1950s to the 1990s. He is best known for his brief tenure as a member and occasional lead singer of The Crickets from 1958 to 1960, and for his acting roles in numerous low-budget movies and TV shows in the 1960s.

He recorded under the names Earl Sinks, Sinx Mitchell, Earl Richards, and Earl "Snake" Richards. He wrote songs for various other artists, including Sue Thompson, The Everly Brothers, The Newbeats, Ernie Ashworth, Brenda Lee, Roy Orbison, Mel Tillis, and Buddy Holly. He also played guitar and sang harmony for sessions with artists such as Mel Tillis, Del Reeves, Mel Street, and Charlie Pride.

== Music career ==
Sinks performed with Bob Wills at the age of twelve; he created his first recordings as a solo artist in 1958 (aged eighteen) at Norman Petty Studios. Under the alias of "Earl Henry", he recorded 2 singles: "I Am The Man/Whatcha Gonna Do?" and "My Suzanne/Believe A Traveler" with Dot Records. After Buddy Holly split with The Crickets near the end of 1958, Sinks was brought in as his replacement by manager Norman Petty. He recorded and performed with The Crickets after Holly's death in 1959, contributing to the album In Style With the Crickets, singing on songs such as "I Fought the Law," "Love's Made a Fool of You", "Deborah", and "When You Ask About Love". Sinks' association with The Crickets ended in February 1960, citing a personal disagreement. David Box was later brought in to finish recording and fulfil the band's contract with Coral Records.

Sinks later moved to Nashville, where he continued to release records. He recorded for Decca Records, in addition to Hickory, Capitol, Coral, Brunswick, United Artist, Warner Brothers, and Ace of Hearts Records. He and Norro Wilson, along with Bill Fernez, recorded as the country band The Omegas. In October 1958, Tommy Allsup rejoined The Crickets for the "Biggest Show of Stars: Autumn Edition” after Buddy split from Jerry Allison and Joe Mauldin. The Roses, a vocal backup group, also performed on the tour. To form a new band for the planned “Winter Dance Party Tour”, Buddy asked his friend Waylon Jennings to play bass, with Tommy Allsup on guitar and Allsup's friend Carl Bunch to play drums. Tommy and Sinks remained in New York following the end of the “Winter Dance Party Tour” for promotional pictures with J.I. and Joe B. as The Crickets.

Sinks had recorded earlier with the Crickets, along with Sonny Curtis, and sang lead on their version of "I Fought the Law,” “Someone Someone,” and “Love's Made A Fool of You." In 1959, he came to Nashville with Bob Montgomery, where they worked together as songwriters with Acuff-Rose.

== Acting ==
In the mid-1960s, Nashville filmmaker Ron Ormond sought a leading actor for his low-budget films. He consulted Smiley Wilson, an artist and booking agent, who recommended his son-in-law, Earl Sinks. At this time, Earl was recording for the Warner Brothers record label as well as appearing in some of the Warner Brothers' television shows, such as Cheyenne, Sugarfoot, and Surfside Six. In his debut film with Ron Ormond, The Girl From Tobacco Row, Earl Sinks acquired a new nickname, "Snake Richards". During an interview with Ken Beck of the Tennessean newspaper, Sinks revealed: “Ron gave me that name.” From then on, deejays began referring to him as Snake Richards. Along with The Girl From Tobacco Row, Ormond's film White Lightnin' Road also included Earl as "Snake" and also later in the 20th Century Fox film by Richard Ball That Tennessee Beat.

== Later life ==
By the 1970s, Sinks was focused on music production and business, running Ace of Hearts Records and acting as a producer. Over the years he produced for artists such as John Anderson, Faron Young, Joyce Cobb, Jimmy Dickens, Porter Wagoner, Mark Dinning, The Remingtons, Bobby Lewis, Mel Street, and many more.

According to the Nashville Tennessean, Sinks lived with his wife, who was once known as Little Rita Faye on the Grand Ole Opry and was the daughter of country stars Smiley and Kitty Wilson. They were married for over 50 years and lived in Goodlettsville, where Rita and their son, Brandon Earl Sinks, still reside.

Earl Sinks died at his home on May 13, 2017.

== Discography ==
=== Solo ===
Studio Albums

- The Sun Is Shining (On Everybody But Me) (1970) ^{5}

Singles

- "Whatcha Gonna Do?" / "I Am The Man" (1958) ^{1}
- "My Suzanne" / "Believe A Traveller" (1958) ^{1}
- "Look For Me (I'll Be There)" / "SuperMarket" (1961) ^{2}
- "Little Susie Parker" / "Superstitious" (1961) ^{2}
- "Be Good" / "A Little Bit Of Heaven" (1962) ^{3}
- "Looking For Love" / "Raining On My Side of Town" (1963) ^{3}
- "Love Is All I'm Asking For" / "This Weird Sensation" (1964) ^{4}
- "The Language Of Love" / "Return To Thunder Road" (1965) ^{3}
- "Maggie" / "Shake 'Em Up And Let 'Em Roll" (1968) ^{5}
- "The House Of Blue Lights" / "Hard Times A Comin'" (1969) ^{5}
- "Corrine, Corrina" / "Climbing A Mountain" (1969) ^{5}
- "What You Gonna Do, Leroy?" / "Can't Live Down The Lovin'" (1970) ^{5}
- "Sunshine" / "San Francisco Mabel Joy" (1970) ^{5}
- "Baby I Need Your Lovin" / "Our House On Paper" (1971) ^{5}
- "You Were Crying" / "You Drove Her Right Into My Arms" (1971) ^{5}
- "Down Along The Cove" / "Let It Be" (1972) ^{5}
- "Margie, Who's Watching The Baby?" / "My Land" (1972) ^{5}
- "Things Are Kinda Slow At The House" / "Do My Playing At Home" (1973) ^{5}
- "The Sun Is Shining (On Everybody But Me)" / "Mother Nature's Daughter" (1973) ^{5}
- "How Can I Tell Her" / "Walkin' In Teardrops" (1973) ^{5}
- "Julianne" / "House of Blue Lights" (1977) ^{5}

Compilations

- Earl Richards (1976) ^{5}
- House of Blue Lights (1977) ^{5}
- The Man With 1000 Names a.k.a. After School Sessions ^{3}

=== The Crickets ===
Studio Albums

- In Style With the Crickets (1960)

Singles / EP's

- "Love's Made a Fool of You" / "Someone, Someone" (1959)
- "When You Ask About Love" / "Deborah" (1959)
- The Crickets (1960)
- "A Sweet Love" / "I Fought the Law" (1961)

=== The Omegas ===
Singles

- "Froze" / "When You Touch Me" (1959)
- "Study Hall" / " So How Come (No One Loves Me)" (1960)
- "Falling in Love" / "No One Will Ever Know" (1960)

=== The Mar-Vels ===
Singles

- "Then I'll Cry" / "Lookin' At The Ceiling" (1966)

=== Other appearances ===
- Rockin' Rollin' High School Vol. 1 (1980)
- Rockin' Rollin' High School Vol. 2 (1980)
- The Clovis Sessions – Vol. 1 (1984)
- Study Hall (2013)

^{1} Released as Earl Henry.
^{2} Released as Earl Sink.
^{3} Released as Earl Sinks.
^{4} Released as Sinx Mitchell.
^{5} Released as Earl Richards.
