= More Than I Can Say =

1960 single by the Crickets

Single by the Crickets

from the album In Style with the Crickets
- B-side: "Baby My Heart"
- Released: April 1960 (UK); May 1960 (US)
- Length: 2:38
- Label: Coral
- Songwriters: Sonny Curtis, Jerry Allison
- Producer: Norman Petty

The Crickets singles chronology
"When You Ask About Love" (1959)	"More Than I Can Say" (1960)	"Don't Cha Know" (1960)

"More Than I Can Say" is a song written by Sonny Curtis and Jerry Allison, both former members of Buddy Holly's band the Crickets. They recorded it in 1959 soon after Holly's death and released it in 1960. Their original version reached No. 42 on the British Record Retailer Chart in 1960. It has been notably performed by singers Bobby Vee and Leo Sayer.

== Original version ==
"More Than I Can Say" was the third single from the Crickets' second release, In Style with the Crickets. The song was written by guitarist Sonny Curtis and drummer Jerry Allison in around an hour in 1959. The hook was left unfinished at the time, and at the time of recording, the hook was left this way with no lyrics, only the "wo-wo yay-yay", which became a memorable part of the song. The single went on to become a minor hit in the UK, entering the top 40 and peaking at No. 26. Curtis considers this song to be one of his most enduring, looking back at the success subsequent artists have had performing it.

=== Personnel ===
- Sonny Curtis - vocals, guitar
- Joe B. Mauldin - bass
- Jerry Allison - drums
- Dudley Brooks - piano

=== Charts ===
Chart	Peak position
UK singles chart	26

== Bobby Vee version ==
Bobby Vee was an American pop music singer whose prominence in the music industry arose from tragedy. After Holly, Ritchie Valens and The Big Bopper were killed in a plane crash on February 3, 1959, a then-teenaged Vee was one of a group of local musicians recruited to play at the next leg of a scheduled concert in Fargo, North Dakota. In 1961, Vee (whose other hit singles include "Take Good Care of My Baby" and "The Night Has a Thousand Eyes") recorded "More Than I Can Say", and it reached No. 61 on the Billboard Hot 100 chart. It was a bigger hit in the United Kingdom, where the song and its B-side, "Staying In", peaked at No. 4 on the UK Singles Chart. It also reached No. 8 in New Zealand. It was featured on his 1961 self-titled album, Bobby Vee.

== Beatles live cover version ==
According to author Mark Lewisohn in The Complete Beatles Chronicle (p. 364), the Beatles performed "More Than I Can Say" live in 1961 and 1962 (in Hamburg and Liverpool and elsewhere). Author Allen J. Weiner in The Beatles: The Ultimate Recording Guide (p. 206) confirms this, noting that it came from a setlist made at the time by George Harrison. It is unclear whether the lead vocal was by John Lennon, Paul McCartney or Harrison. No recording is known to survive.

== Leo Sayer version ==
"More Than I Can Say"

Single by Leo Sayer

from the album Living in a Fantasy
- B-side: "Only Fooling" (most of the world); "Millionaire" (US)
- Released: June 27, 1980
- Genre: Soft rock
- Length: 3:34
- Label: Warner Bros.
- Songwriters: Sonny Curtis, Jerry Allison
- Producer: Alan Tarney

Leo Sayer singles chronology
"When the Money Runs Out" (1979)	"More Than I Can Say" (1980)	"Once in a While" (1980)

Leo Sayer's version of "More Than I Can Say" spent five weeks at No. 2 on the Billboard Hot 100 chart in December 1980 into January 1981 (behind "Lady" by Kenny Rogers). Sayer's version of the song was certified gold by the RIAA. It also spent three weeks at No. 1 on the Billboard Adult Contemporary chart. In the UK, the song peaked at No. 2 on the UK Singles Chart, while it spent two weeks atop the Kent Music Report in Australia.

Sayer has said that while looking for an "oldie" to record for his album Living in a Fantasy, he saw a television commercial for a greatest hits collection by Bobby Vee and chose the song on the spot: "We went into a record store that afternoon, bought the record and had the song recorded that night."

The music video for the song was frequently aired on MTV when that channel launched on August 1, 1981.

=== Weekly charts ===
Chart (1980–1981)	Peak position
Australia (Kent Music Report)	1
Austria (Ö3 Austria Top 40)	2
Belgium (Ultratop 50 Flanders)	4
Canada RPM Top Singles	7
Denmark (Hitlisten)	1
Ireland (IRMA)	2
Netherlands (Single Top 100)	9
Netherlands (Dutch Top 40)	6
New Zealand	5
South Africa (Springbok Radio)	2
Spain (AFYVE)	6
Switzerland (Schweizer Hitparade)	2
UK Singles Chart	2
US Billboard Hot 100	2
US Billboard Adult Contemporary	1
US Cash Box Top 100	3
US Record World Singles Chart	3
West Germany (GfK)	8
Zimbabwe (ZIMA)	1

=== Year-end charts ===
Chart (1980)	Rank
Australia (Kent Music Report)	8
South Africa	20
UK	49
US Cash Box	47

Chart (1981)	Rank
Canada	64
US Billboard Hot 100	52

== J.C. Lodge version ==
June Lodge did a reggae version that became popular in Belgium, Germany and the Netherlands in 1982.

== See also ==
- List of number-one singles in Australia during the 1980s
- List of number-one adult contemporary singles of 1980 (U.S.)
