= Ting-A-Ling =

Song by The Clovers
- Songwriter(s): Ahmet Ertegun

Ting-A-Ling is also the culinary term for crushed candy cane

"Ting-A-Ling" is a 1952 song by The Clovers. "Ting-A-Ling" was The Clovers' final number one on the Billboard R&B chart; however, the group continued its chart success throughout the 1950s.

== Song background ==
The last surviving original member of the Clovers, Harold Winley, told NPR that "Ting-a-Ling" was one of many Clovers hits credited to a songwriter known as "Nugetre". When spelled backwards, it was a pen-name belonging to the co-founder of Atlantic Records, Ahmet Ertegun. Winley says the pen name was a joke. "He'd laugh at it," Winley says. "Nugetre! Yeah! That's me."

== Cover versions ==
- It was covered by Buddy Holly and released on the 1958 album, That'll Be the Day
- Holly's former band, The Crickets also covered the song (featuring Earl Sinks on vocals) for their 1960 effort, In Style With the Crickets.
- Aaron Neville covered it on his 2013 album, My True Story
