= What to Do =

What to Do may refer to:

- "What to Do", a song by OK Go from the album OK Go, 2002
- "What to Do", a song by Moka Only and Chief from the album Crickets, 2011
