= When You Ask About Love =

1959 song by The Crickets

- UK Coral vinyl record

Single by The Crickets

from the album In Style with the Crickets
- B-side: "Deborah"
- Released: October 1959 (US); November 1959 (UK)
- Genre: Rock and roll
- Length: 2:05
- Label: Brunswick (US); Coral (UK)
- Songwriter(s): Jerry Allison; Sonny Curtis
- Producer(s): Norman Petty

The Crickets singles chronology
"Love's Made a Fool of You" (1959)	"When You Ask About Love" (1959)	"More Than I Can Say" (1960)

"When You Ask About Love" is a song written by Jerry Allison and Sonny Curtis and recorded by the Crickets in 1959. It was a hit in Britain, reaching number 27 in the UK Singles Chart.

== The Crickets version ==
"When You Ask About Love" was the second single from the Crickets' second album, In Style With the Crickets. It was also the second single to be released after the death of Buddy Holly. The song was written by guitarist Sonny Curtis and drummer Jerry Allison whilst they were at the home of Allison's girlfriend and future wife, Peggy Sue Gerron (after whom the Buddy Holly song is named). The B-side "Deborah" was named after Peggy Sue's younger niece.

=== Personnel ===
- Earl Sinks - vocals
- Sonny Curtis - guitar
- Joe B. Mauldin - bass
- Jerry Allison - drums
- Dudley Brooks - piano

=== Charts ===
Chart (1960)	Peak position
UK Singles (OCC)	27

== Matchbox version ==
"When You Ask About Love"

Single by Matchbox

from the album Midnite Dynamos
- B-side: "You've Made a Fool of Me"
- Released: 19 September 1980
- Genre: Rockabilly
- Length: 2:35
- Label: Magnet
- Songwriter(s): Jerry Allison; Sonny Curtis
- Producer(s): Peter Collins

Matchbox singles chronology
"Midnite Dynamos" (1980)	"When You Ask About Love" (1980)	"Over The Rainbow/You Belong To Me" (1980)

In 1980, English rockabilly band Matchbox released a cover of the song as the second single from for their fourth album Midnite Dynamos. It was the band's biggest hit, reaching number 4 on the UK Singles Chart.

=== Reception ===
Reviewing the song in Record Mirror, Mike Nicholls described the song as "pukeabilly – uninspired, backward looking and unoriginal – surely we've got past this by now. If you want this sort of "music" – go back and listen to Buddy Holly, at least he had some conviction."

=== Charts ===
Chart (1980–81)	Peak position
Australia (AMR)	55
Austria (Ö3 Austria Top 40)	16
Belgium (Ultratop 50 Flanders)	22
Germany (GfK)	29
Ireland (IRMA)	3
Netherlands (Dutch Top 40)	20
Netherlands (Single Top 100)	18
UK Singles (OCC)	4

== Other recordings ==
- In 1962, Julie Grant covered the song for the B-side of "Up on the Roof".
- In 1965, Billy J. Kramer with The Dakotas covered the song, for their US album Trains and Boats and Planes.
- In 1965, Mancunian Johnny Peters covered the song as a single, but it failed to chart.
- In 1980, Swedish band Sven-Erics covered the song for their album Santa Maria.
- In 1998, a cover by Mike Berry & The Outlaws was featured on the album Rock 'n' Roll Daze.
