= My Little Girl (Crickets song) =

Single by The Crickets

from the album Just for Fun
- B-side: "Teardrops Fall Like Rain"
- Released: January 25, 1963
- Recorded: October 17, 1962
- Studio: Pacific Enterprises Studios, Los Angeles, California
- Genre: Rock and Roll
- Length: 1:55
- Label: Liberty
- Songwriter(s): Sonny Curtis
- Producer(s): Snuff Garrett

The Crickets singles chronology
| "Little Hollywood Girl" (1962) | "My Little Girl" (1963) | "April Avenue" (1963) |

"My Little Girl" is a song that was recorded by The Crickets in 1962 and released on the Liberty label in 1963. This song, which charted at No. 17 in UK. It had a similar beat/tempo to the songs "Peggy Sue" and "Peggy Sue Got Married", which had been released earlier, credited to just Buddy Holly instead of Buddy Holly and the Crickets.

== Chart performance ==
Chart performance for "My Little Girl"
| Chart (1963) | Peak position |
|---|---|
| UK Singles (OCC) | 17 |
