= David Box =

American rockabilly singer (1943–1964)

- Birth name: Harold David Box
- Born: August 11, 1943; Sulphur Springs, Texas, U.S.
- Origin: Lubbock, Texas, U.S.
- Died: October 23, 1964 (aged 21); Houston, Texas, U.S.
- Genres: Rock and roll, rockabilly
- Occupation(s): Singer, musician
- Instrument(s): Vocals, guitar
- Years active: 1960–1964
- Labels: Coral, Candix, Joed
- Website: http://www.davidbox.net/

Harold David Box (August 11, 1943 – October 23, 1964) was an American rock and roll musician in the early 1960s. Box was influenced by fellow Texan Buddy Holly, and even took his place as singer of his group, The Crickets, for a short time after Holly's death. Box also collaborated with Roy Orbison, and found local success with his own group, the Ravens.

Surviving recordings show that David Box was equally comfortable doing cover versions of established songs ("That's All I Want from You," "Apache","Funny How Time Slips Away", etc.) and his own compositions. His vocal range was also flexible; in the upbeat songs he sounds somewhat like Buddy Holly, and in the ballads he is obviously influenced by Roy Orbison. Box recorded mostly for independent record labels, but his record of "Little Lonely Summer Girl" became a regional hit in the summer of 1964, and he was on the verge of signing a contract with RCA Victor in the fall.

== Life and career ==
Harold David Box was born to Virginia and Harold Box on August 11, 1943 in Sulphur Springs, Texas, United States. Box's family moved to Lubbock, Texas in 1946. Box was greatly influenced by his father, a self-taught Western Swing fiddle musician and started singing at the age of three, making public appearances at this time. His father taught him to play guitar at the age of nine. His style was later influenced by recordings of Buddy Holly. In 1958, Box formed his own band, The Ravens, with Box on vocals and Fender Stratocaster guitar, and classmates Lynn Bailey on bass, and Ernie Hall on drums. The band cut their first demos at Mitchell Studio in Lubbock.

As a close neighbor of Jerry Allison's parents, Ernie Hall reported that The Crickets needed a replacement for guitarist and vocalist Sonny Curtis, who had been drafted into the Army. The Ravens sent in their demos and auditioned, eventually winning the role; Box and Hall went to Los Angeles to cut the Crickets' next single. Box and Hall's composition, "Don't Cha Know" was used as the A-side, while a Buddy Holly composition, "Peggy Sue Got Married" was used as the B-side. Box played guitar and sang, Joe B. Mauldin played bass, Ernie Hall played drums on "Don't Cha Know", while Jerry Allison played drums on "Peggy Sue Got Married" and acoustic guitar on "Peggy Sue Got Married". This was the final single by the Crickets on Coral Records. For the following three weeks, Box supported the Crickets on tour before returning home to complete schooling. Box continued his music as a solo artist primarily at Ben Hall / Hi-Fidelity Studio located in Big Spring, Texas with specific performances on East Coast tour, and played guitar for Dusty Springfield first USA recording at RCA. Box was also included in the all-star August 1964 radio KILT Back-to-School Show at the Sam Houston Coliseum Houston, Texas.

David Box and fellow Texan artist, B.J.Thomas, were both label-mates signed to the independent Joed label.

On October 23, 1964, David Box was a passenger in the small Cessna 172 Skyhawk, piloted by Bill Daniel including passengers Carl Banks and Buddy Groves of The Kings Band Houston, Texas. The other band members, Glen Spreen and Bill Tillman, were invited earlier on this flight, however, both declined; David Box, who was a visiting musician guest, accepted the invitation. Their plane crashed, killing him. Many accounts exist about that day with pilot error given as the final contributing factor.

== Honors ==
Box was inducted posthumously to the West Texas Music Hall of Fame and the Buddy Holly Walk of Fame (West Texas Walk of Fame) in Lubbock in September 2006.

== "Out of The Box" ==
"Out of the Box: The 50th Anniversary Tribute To David Box Songs" was commissioned and released on CD in October 2014 by Box's younger sister, Rita Box Peek. The album is a contemporary instrumental reworking of David Box songs, performed by Lubbock musician Brian McRae. McRae played David Box's original Stratocaster guitar (in duo and solo settings) on the album.

Rita, known as the guardian of David Box's legacy, co-produced along with Brian McRae "to extend David Box music within a new format for the 21st Century and beyond." The album was released in conjunction with a David Box tribute she organized and presented at the Buddy Holly Center in Lubbock on October 22, 2014, the eve of the fiftieth anniversary of his passing. McRae performed all of the songs from the CD and Rita Box Peek sang "Don't You Know" (her version of David's hit, "Don't Cha Know") at the event. Guest speakers included Rita Box Peek, Peggy Sue Gerron, Glen Spreen and Dow Patterson.

"Out of The Box" was released for the first time in digital format on the CDBaby website in October 2018 (that month, Rita Box Peek also released her first jazz album, Just for You, produced and backed by Brian McRae).

== Discography ==
=== Singles ===
Year	Title	Label
1960	"Don't Cha Know" / "Peggy Sue Got Married"	Coral Records *
1962	"I Do The Best I Can" / "Waitin'"	Joed Records
1962	"If You Can't Say Something Nice" / "I've Had My Moments"	Candix Records
1964	"If You Can't Say Something Nice" / "Sweet, sweet, day "	Joed Records
1964	"Little Lonely Summer Girl" / "No One Will Ever Know"	Joed Records

*With The Crickets

=== Albums ===
Year	Title	Label
2002	The David Box Story	Rollercoaster Records
2014	Out of The Box	Rita Box Peek
2015	The David Box Story Vol. II	Rollercoaster Records
