= Love's Made a Fool of You =

1959 single by The Crickets

Single by The Crickets

from the album In Style with the Crickets
- B-side: "Someone, Someone"
- Released: February 27, 1959
- Recorded: December 16, 1958
- Studio: Norman Petty Recording (Clovis, New Mexico)
- Genre: Rock and roll
- Length: 2:02
- Label: Brunswick 9-55124
- Songwriters: Buddy Holly, Bob Montgomery

The Crickets singles chronology
"It's So Easy!" (1958)	"Love's Made a Fool of You" (1959)	"When You Ask About Love" (1959)

"Love's Made a Fool of You" is a song co-written and originally recorded by Buddy Holly. It was released as a single in 1959 on Brunswick Records by The Crickets without Buddy Holly in a new recording. It featured Sonny Curtis with the Crickets, with the lead vocal by Earl Sinks. It was covered by the Bobby Fuller Four in 1966.

Buddy Holly wrote the song in 1954. It was not until 1958 that he recorded it, as an Everly Brothers demo, which was not released until 1964 on the posthumous Showcase LP. The first public release of "Love's Made a Fool of You", however, was by the Crickets, headed by Sonny Curtis in 1959. It was released as a single from In Style with the Crickets, and stayed on the UK Singles Chart for two weeks, peaking at number 26. The Crickets' version, without Holly, was accidentally included on the 1972 compilation album Buddy Holly: A Rock and Roll Collection; the same mistake was made on 1997's The Very Best of Buddy Holly.

== Personnel ==
- Earl Sinks – lead vocals
- Sonny Curtis – guitar
- Joe Mauldin – bass
- Jerry Allison – drums
- The Roses (Robert Linville, Ray Rush, David Bingham) – backing vocals

== Charts ==
Chart (1959)	Peak Position
UK singles chart	26

== Bobby Fuller Four version ==
"Love's Made a Fool of You"
- Single label of "Love's Made a Fool of You"

Single by The Bobby Fuller Four
- B-side: "Don't Ever Let Me Know"
- Released: 1966
- Recorded: 1965–1966
- Genre: Rock and roll
- Length: 2:02
- Label: Mustang
- Songwriters: Buddy Holly, Bob Montgomery
- Producer: Bob Keane

The Bobby Fuller Four singles chronology
"I Fought the Law" (1965)	"Love's Made a Fool of You" (1966)	"The Magic Touch" (1966)

The Bobby Fuller Four released a version of the song in 1966, and it became one of the group's most successful recordings. It was another Crickets cover, to follow their smash-hit "I Fought the Law". It broke the Top 30, and was also performed live on Hollywood A Go-Go. This recording features Dalton Powell on drums, taking over from longtime drummer, DeWayne Quirico.

=== Personnel ===
- Bobby Fuller - guitar, vocals
- Randy Fuller (musician) - bass, backing vocals
- Jim Reese (musician) - guitar, backing vocals
- Dalton Powell - drums

=== Charts ===
Chart (1966)	Peak Position
New Zealand (Listener)	14
US Singles Chart	26

== Other versions ==
- Bobby Vee released a cover of Holly's version in 1961 on his album Bobby Vee with Strings and Things.
- Canadian group the Esquires released their version as a single on Capitol Records in 1965.
- The Dixies released a 45 single version on Parlophone Records in the UK in 1965.
- Tom Rush recorded a cover of the song for his 1966 album, Take a Little Walk with Me.
- Cochise covered the song on their 1971 album, Swallow Tales.
- Susie Allanson on the 1979 album Heart to Heart
- Tatsuro Yamashita on the 1972 album Add Some Music to Your Day.
- A Greg Kihn version appears on the 1977 album, Greg Kihn Again (Beserkley Records).
- The Hollies released their version on the 1980 album Buddy Holly.
- Matchbox released their version in 1981 which peaked at No. 13 in Finland, No. 40 in the Netherlands and No. 63 in the UK.
- A Chris Spedding version appears on the 1986 album, Enemy Within.
- Lemmy, Slim Jim and Danny B released a recording on their 2000 self-titled album on Cleopatra.
- Johnny Rivers recorded a version with the Crickets on the 2004 album The Crickets and Their Buddies.
- A Carla Olson/James Intveld version of the song appears on the 2013 Olson album, Have Harmony, Will Travel.
- The Bunch on the 1972 album Rock On.

== Sources ==
- Amburn, Ellis (2014). Buddy Holly: A Biography. St. Martin's Press. ISBN 978-0-312-14557-6.
- Goldrosen, John (1975). Buddy Holly: His Life and Music. Popular Press. ISBN 0-85947-018-0
- Norman, Philip (2011). Buddy: The Definitive Biography of Buddy Holly. Pan MacMillan. ISBN 978-1-447-20340-7.
- Cott, Jonathan (1976). In The Rolling Stone Illustrated History of Rock and Roll. Rolling Stone Press, Random House. ISBN 0-394-73238-3.
- Bustard, Anne (2005). Buddy: The Story of Buddy Holly. Simon & Schuster. ISBN 978-1-4223-9302-4.
- Dawson, Jim; Leigh, Spencer (1996). Memories of Buddy Holly. Big Nickel Publications. ISBN 978-0-936433-20-2.
- Goldrosen, John; Beecher, John (1996). Remembering Buddy: The Definitive Biography. New York: Da Capo Press. ISBN 0-306-80715-7.
- Laing, Dave (1971–2010). Buddy Holly. Icons of Pop Music. Bloomington, IN: Indiana University Press. ISBN 0-253-22168-4. OCLC 611172616.
- Mann, Alan (1996). The A-Z of Buddy Holly. Aurum Press (2nd edition). ISBN 1-85410-433-0 or 978–1854104335.
- Norman, Phillip (1996) Rave On: The Biography of Buddy Holly. Simon & Schuster Publishing. ISBN 0684800829.
- Peer, Elizabeth and Ralph II (1972). Buddy Holly: A Biography in Words, Photographs and Music. Australia: Peer International. ASIN B000W24DZO.
- Peters, Richard (1990). The Legend That Is Buddy Holly. Barnes & Noble Books. ISBN 0-285-63005-9 or 978–0285630055.
- Rabin, Stanton (2009). OH BOY! The Life and Music of Rock 'n' Roll Pioneer Buddy Holly. Van Winkle Publishing (Kindle). ASIN B0010QBLLG.
- Tobler, John (1979). The Buddy Holly Story. Beaufort Books.
