= Peggy Sue Got Married (song) =

1959 single by Buddy Holly

Single by Buddy Holly
- B-side: "Crying, Waiting, Hoping"
- Released: July 20, 1959 (US); August 28, 1959 (UK)
- Recorded: December 8, 1958 and June 30, 1959
- Genre: Rock and roll
- Length: 2:04
- Label: Coral
- Songwriter: Buddy Holly
- Producer: Jack Hansen

Buddy Holly singles chronology
"It Doesn't Matter Anymore" (1959)	"Peggy Sue Got Married" (1959)	"True Love Ways" (1960)

"Peggy Sue Got Married" is a song written and performed by Buddy Holly. It was posthumously released in July 1959 as a 45-rpm single with "Crying, Waiting, Hoping". It refers to his 1957 hit song "Peggy Sue". It was one of the first sequels of the rock era. The song was inspired by "Peggy Sue" name inspiration Peggy Sue Gerron's 1958 marriage to The Crickets drummer Jerry Allison in 1958.

The 1986 film Peggy Sue Got Married, directed by Francis Ford Coppola and starring Kathleen Turner and Nicolas Cage, is based on and features the song.

== Buddy Holly version ==
Buddy Holly recorded the vocal, accompanying himself on guitar, on December 8, 1958, in apartment 4H of "The Brevoort" on New York City's Fifth Avenue. Record producer Jack Hansen prepared Holly's solo recording for commercial release. The Ray Charles Singers recorded backup vocals, and studio musicians recorded an instrumental arrangement on June 30, 1959, at Coral Records' Studio A in New York. In 1964, Holly's former producer Norman Petty recorded an alternate version of the song, with new instrumentals (by The Fireballs) but without backup singers.

The studio recording sessions and overdubs for "Peggy Sue Got Married" were similar to those for the posthumous track "Crying, Waiting, Hoping". Buddy Holly's original, undubbed home recording was used as theme music in the film Peggy Sue Got Married.

The Coral Records single reached number 13 on the official UK singles chart, Record Retailers (RR), in 1959 in a 10 week chart run.

The song chronicled "Peggy Sue" name inspiration Peggy Sue Gerron's marriage to Crickets drummer, and Holly friend, Jerry Allison which took place in 1958. The couple eventually divorced in later years.

== The Crickets version ==
After Buddy Holly had died in a plane crash on February 3, 1959, the Crickets recorded their own version in June 1959. David Box, a native of Lubbock, Texas, and a Buddy Holly soundalike, joined the group as lead vocalist for this version of "Peggy Sue Got Married" which was released in the United States as the B-side of Coral 62238 in 1960. The Crickets had decided to use the original arrangements they had used for "Peggy Sue" with the only change being David Box on lead vocal.

== Sources ==
- Amburn, Ellis (1996). Buddy Holly: A Biography. St. Martin's Press. ISBN 978-0-312-14557-6
- Bustard, Anne (2005). Buddy: The Story of Buddy Holly. Simon & Schuster. ISBN 978-1-4223-9302-4
- Dawson, Jim; Leigh, Spencer (1996). Memories of Buddy Holly. Big Nickel Publications. ISBN 978-0-936433-20-2
- Gerron, Peggy Sue (2008). Whatever Happened to Peggy Sue?. Togi Entertainment. ISBN 978-0-9800085-0-0
- Goldrosen, John; Beecher, John (1996). Remembering Buddy: The Definitive Biography. New York: Da Capo Press. ISBN 0-306-80715-7
- Goldrosen, John (1975). Buddy Holly: His Life and Music. Popular Press. ISBN 0-85947-018-0
- Gribbin, John (2009). Not Fade Away: The Life and Music of Buddy Holly. London: Icon Books. ISBN 978-1-84831-034-6
- Norman, Phillip (1996). Rave On: The Biography of Buddy Holly. Simon & Schuster Publishing. ISBN

0684800829.

- Peer, Elizabeth and Ralph II (1972). Buddy Holly: A Biography in Words, Photographs and Music. Australia: Peer International. ASIN B000W24DZO.
