= Jerry Allison =

American rock musician (1939–2022)

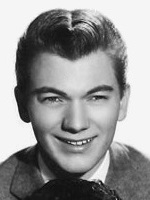
- Allison in 1958

Background information
- Born: Jerry Ivan Allison; August 31, 1939; Hillsboro, Texas, U.S.
- Died: August 22, 2022 (aged 82) Lyles, Tennessee, U.S.
- Genres: Rock and roll; rockabilly
- Instruments: Drums; percussion; vocals; guitar
- Formerly of: The Crickets

Jerry Ivan Allison (August 31, 1939 – August 22, 2022) was an American musician. He was best known as the drummer and only constant member of the Crickets and co-writer of their hits "That'll Be the Day" and "Peggy Sue", recorded with Buddy Holly. He had a solo chart entry on the Billboard Hot 100, "Real Wild Child", which was issued in 1958 under the name Ivan. Allison was inducted into the Rock and Roll Hall of Fame in 2012.

== Background ==
Allison's first professional recording was "Who's Gonna Be the Next One Honey", released as a 45-rpm disc (now very rare) by a local group, Hal Goodson and the Raiders. It was also performed at the Norman Petty Recording Studios in Clovis, New Mexico, about six months before "Peggy Sue" was recorded. In their early days at the Lubbock Youth Center, in Lubbock, Texas, Allison's drumming was the sole accompaniment to Buddy Holly's vocals and guitar, allowing Holly to perform some of his best guitar work.

Over time, Allison's rhythm backup ranged from slapping his hands on his knees or clapping his hands to a modal plainness of cymbal drumming. Songs released under Holly's name, were softer in tone and filled with innocence and longing. On these, Allison played only tom-toms, in keeping with the sound of the vocals. His work on the Crickets' recordings gave the records much of their distinctiveness and has influenced subsequent generations of rock and roll drummers.

Allison did not sing on the Crickets' records made with Holly—despite the misleading crediting of the band as "vocal group with instrumental accompaniment"—but in 1958 he released the single "Real Wild Child" (having heard Johnny O'Keefe play the original during the Crickets' brief visit to Australia that year), which he recorded under the pseudonym Ivan, with Holly playing guitar and singing backing vocals. It was a minor chart entry in 1958 and the first studio recording of the song, which became a rock standard. Allison also sang on a few later releases by the Crickets, both singles and album tracks.

Allison also worked as a session musician. For example, he played on the studio recording of the Everly Brothers' "(Till) I Kissed You" in 1959.

== Peggy Sue ==
According to Holly's biographer John Goldrosen, the song "Peggy Sue" was originally named after Holly's niece, Cindy Lou, but the name was changed at Allison's request: Peggy Sue was Allison's girlfriend and later wife, Peggy Sue Gerron (1940–2018), and the altered title was a way of asking her to come back after a break-up. Their marriage in 1958 was also chronicled in Holly's "Peggy Sue" sequel song "Peggy Sue Got Married."

== Career after Holly ==
After Holly's death in 1959, Allison continued his musical career. He retained control of the Crickets' name and the band continued to tour and record. The most consistent members were bassist Joe B. Mauldin, who was in the Crickets with Holly, and guitarist/vocalist Sonny Curtis, who played with Holly before the Crickets were formed in 1957 and joined the group shortly after Holly's death. Others who were in the band at one time or another include Glen D. Hardin, who was also a member of Elvis Presley's live band; Albert Lee, who was also once a member of Emmylou Harris's Hot Band; Ric Grech; and several lead vocalists, including Earl Sinks, David Box, and Jerry Naylor.

The band's last recordings for the Coral label included several singles, which were incorporated in the 1960 album In Style with the Crickets. The rock classic "I Fought the Law", written by Curtis, first appeared there, and tracks from singles released after Holly's death included their version of Holly's "Love's Made a Fool of You", a chart entry for them in the UK in late 1959, and the Allison–Curtis composition "More Than I Can Say", which was a UK No. 4 hit by Bobby Vee in 1962 and UK and US No. 2 hit by Leo Sayer in 1980.

Allison switched the band's contract to Liberty Records in 1960, after they had supported The Everly Brothers on a UK tour. He moved his base to Los Angeles, where an old Texas friend, Snuff Garrett, was a senior producer at Liberty. Allison, Curtis and another former Holly sideman, Tommy Allsup, effectively became the core Liberty house band, working with Bobby Vee, Johnny Burnette and others. In this period they also played as backing musicians on tracks by Eddie Cochran and, according to some reports, Conway Twitty. Both Allison and Curtis were drafted into military service at different times during this period, which introduced some discontinuity in the personnel of the Crickets. Curtis also began to establish a solo career as a songwriter and singer-guitarist.

In the late 1970s, the band toured with Waylon Jennings, another one-time Holly sideman. In more recent years, the Crickets have released albums, including collaborations with artists who recognize their influence in early rock and roll: Nanci Griffith (with whom they have also toured), Eric Clapton, Paul McCartney, Johnny Rivers, Waylon Jennings, Bobby Vee, and others. In 2007, Allison was inducted into the Musicians Hall of Fame and Museum in Nashville, Tennessee, as a member of the Crickets. In 2012, he was inducted into the Rock and Roll Hall of Fame as a member of the Crickets by a special committee, aimed at correcting the mistake of not including the Crickets with Buddy Holly when he was first inducted in 1986. The Crickets played a farewell concert in 2016 at the Surf Ballroom in Clear Lake, Iowa, where Holly had appeared on the night of his death.

== Personal life and death ==
Allison had been in a relationship with Peggy Sue Gerron since they were students at Lubbock High School. They married in 1958, but would eventually divorce when Peggy opted to relocate to Pasadena, California to attend Pasadena Junior College, which led to her finding her own career as a dental assistant and also remarrying; she would eventually return to Texas, where she died in 2018.

After Allison's marriage to Gerron ended, he married his second wife, Joanie Sveum; they remained together until his death.

Allison lived on a farm in Lyles, Tennessee, where he died from cancer on August 22, 2022, at age 82.
