= The Crickets =

American rock and roll band (1957–2016)

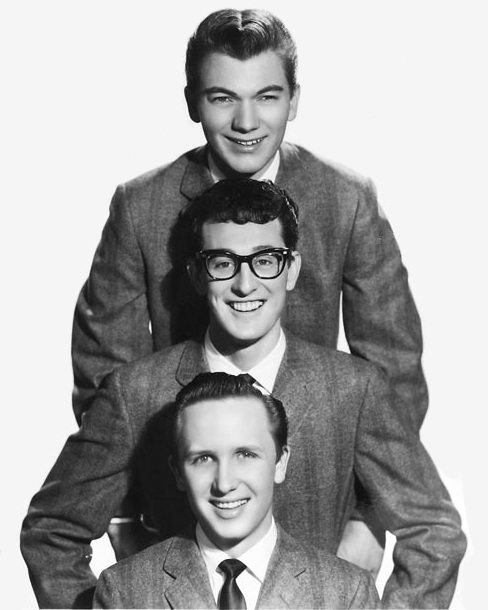
- The Crickets in 1958 (top to bottom): Jerry Allison, Buddy Holly, and Joe B. Mauldin

Background information
- Origin: Lubbock, Texas, U.S.
- Genres: Rock and roll; rockabilly; surf rock; garage rock; rhythm and blues
- Years active: 1957–2016
- Labels: Brunswick; Coral; Liberty; MCA; Vertigo; Chirp
- Past members: Buddy Holly; Jerry Allison; Joe B. Mauldin; Niki Sullivan; Earl Sinks; David Box; Jerry Naylor; Sonny Curtis; Glen Hardin; Tommy Allsup; Ric Grech; Gordon Payne
- Website: www.thecrickets.com

The Crickets were an American rock and roll band from Lubbock, Texas, formed by singer-songwriter Buddy Holly in January 1957. Their first hit record, "That'll Be the Day", released in May 1957, peaked at number one on the Billboard Top 100 chart on September 16, 1957. The sleeve of their first album, The "Chirping" Crickets, shows the band line-up at the time: Holly on lead vocals and lead guitar, Niki Sullivan on rhythm guitar, Jerry Allison on drums, and Joe B. Mauldin on bass. The Crickets helped set the template for subsequent rock bands, such as the Beatles, with their guitar-bass-drums line-up, performing their own material. After Holly's death in 1959, the band continued to tour and record into the 1960s and beyond with other band members through to the 21st century.

== History ==
=== Formation ===
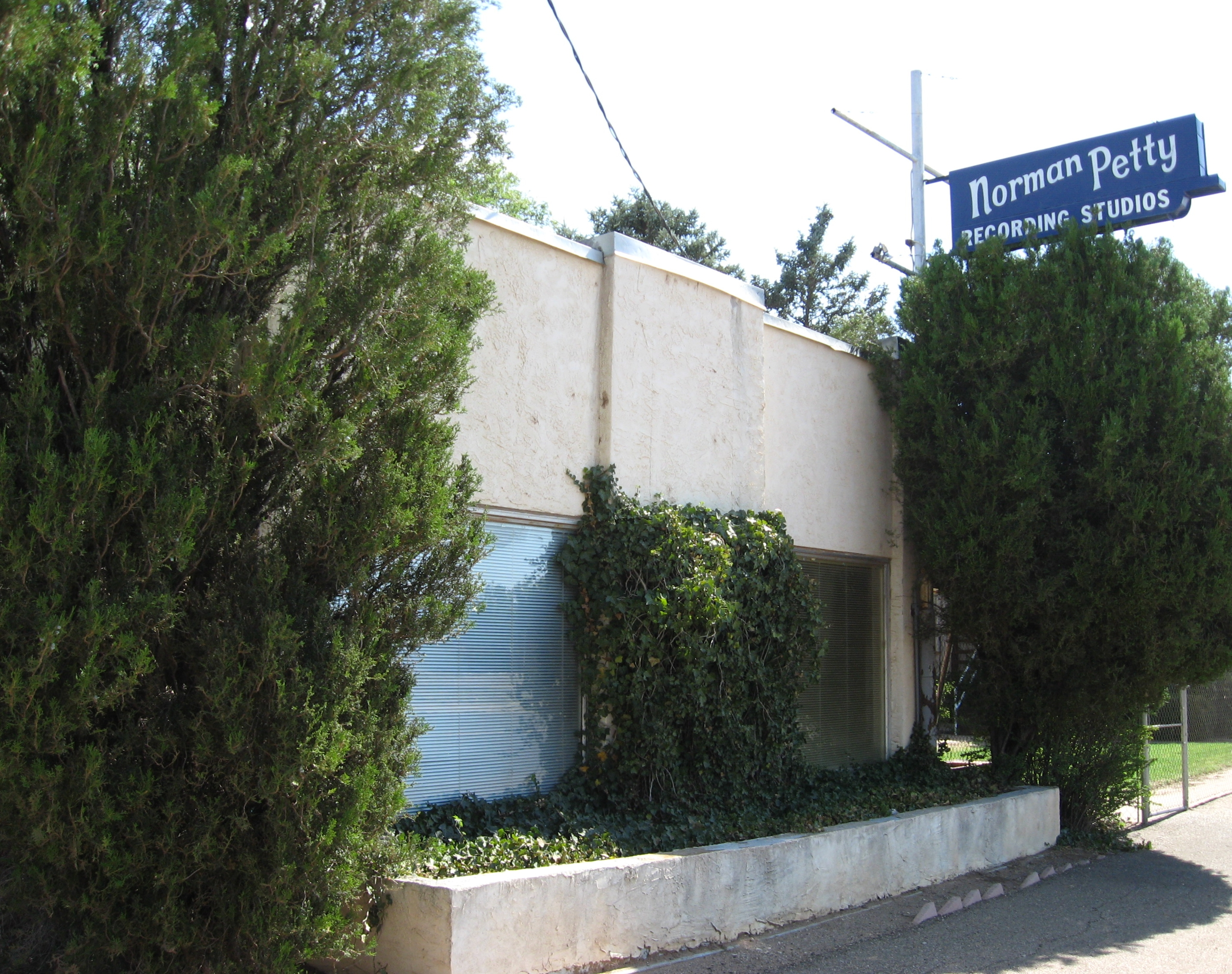
Norman Petty Recording Studios

Holly had been making demo recordings with local musician friends since 1954. Sonny Curtis, Jerry Allison, and Larry Welborn participated in these sessions. In 1956, Holly's band, then known informally as Buddy and the Two Tones (Holly with Sonny Curtis and Don Guess; posthumous releases refer to the Three Tunes), recorded an album's worth of rockabilly numbers in Nashville, Tennessee, for Decca. The records were not more than mildly successful, and the band did not achieve financial success until 1957, when the producer and recording engineer Norman Petty recorded Holly's sessions in Clovis, New Mexico.

Holly had already recorded for another label under his own name, so to avoid legal problems he needed a new name for his group. As the Crickets recalled in John Goldrosen's book Buddy Holly – His Life and Music, they were inspired by other groups named after birds. They were then considering insect-centered names, apparently unaware of the Bronx R&B vocal group the Crickets, who recorded for Jay-Dee. They almost chose the name Beetles; years later, the Beatles chose their name partly in homage to the Crickets.

The Crickets were lead guitarist and vocalist Buddy Holly, drummer Jerry Allison, bassist Joe B. Mauldin, and rhythm guitarist Niki Sullivan. Sullivan dropped out after a little more than one year to resume his education. The Crickets, now a trio, continued to make stage and TV appearances and recorded more songs, many composed by the band members.

=== Early success ===
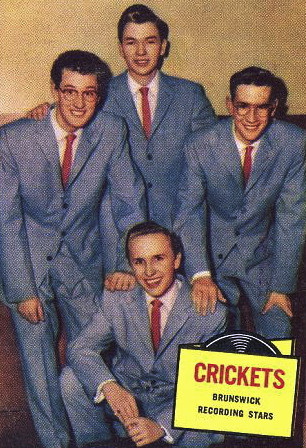
Trading card of the Crickets, 1957: (back row, left to right) Buddy Holly, Jerry Allison, and Niki Sullivan; (front) Joe Mauldin. Topps issued series cards featuring movie stars, television stars and recording stars. The Crickets were part of its series of recording stars cards.

In 1957, Norman Petty arranged for the Crickets' recordings to be marketed under two names. The solo vocals were released as being performed by Buddy Holly, and the songs with dubbed backing vocals were issued as being sung by the Crickets. Petty reasoned correctly that disc jockeys might be reluctant to program a single artist too heavily but would play records by two seemingly different groups. Some disc jockeys referred to the band as "Buddy Holly and the Crickets", but record labels never used this wording until after Holly's death. In August 1957, the group would make history by becoming the first white act to perform at the Apollo Theater in Harlem, New York since it became a venue focused on provided African American entertainment.

In March 1958, the band toured the United Kingdom, playing 50 shows in 25 days. That same year, Holly broke with producer Petty and moved to New York to be more involved with the publishing and recording businesses. Allison and Mauldin chose not to move and returned to Lubbock. Holly now recorded under his own name with the studio musicians Tommy Allsup and Carl Bunch. Allsup, Bunch, and Waylon Jennings toured with him shortly after Holly left the Crickets. Allison and Mauldin looked forward to rejoining Holly after he would return from the 1959 Winter Dance Party Tour through the northern Midwest. In the meantime, Mauldin, Allison, and Sonny Curtis (a friend and collaborator of Holly's) began recording new songs as the Crickets, with vocals by Earl Sinks. While they were recording, it was announced that Holly had died in a plane crash while on tour.

=== After Holly's death ===
The Crickets in 1962: Sonny Curtis, Jerry Allison, Glen Hardin, Jerry Naylor

The Crickets, now with vocalist Earl Sinks, went on performing after Holly's death. David Box, a native of Lubbock, Texas, who sang in a manner similar to Holly, joined the group as lead vocalist for their 1960 single "Dont Cha Know"/"Peggy Sue Got Married", released as Coral 62238 after the departure of Sinks. Curtis was not in the band, as he was completing military service. Box, who had left the group in 1960, died in a charter plane crash on October 23, 1964, while touring as a solo singer.

In April 1960, the Crickets backed the Everly Brothers on their first UK concert tour but were not billed as their backing group. By 1962, the Crickets consisted of Curtis, Allison, Glen D. Hardin, and Jerry Naylor. That year, the Crickets' version of the Gerry Goffin–Carole King song "Don't Ever Change" (Liberty Records), featuring Naylor on lead vocals, reached the top five in the British single charts. Also in 1962 they released Bobby Vee Meets the Crickets, an album with Bobby Vee on lead vocals. For their 1962 UK tour, Allison was temporarily out of the group because of commitments with the U.S. Air Force.

In 1963, the Crickets hit the UK top 40 twice more, with the singles "My Little Girl" and "Don't Try to Change Me", the last of their recordings to reach the charts. The band continued to record. In 1964, the Crickets issued their version of the surf rock song "California Sun" for their album of the same title. In 1970, Jerry Allison and Sonny Curtis performed backing vocals for Eric Clapton for his first solo album titled Eric Clapton.

Personnel changes were made over the years, with Curtis and Allison remaining relative constants. For the 1971 album Rockin' 50s Rock n' Roll (which consisted mostly of remakes of Holly-era material), the group consisted of Curtis, Allison and Doug Gilmore. For the 1973 album Bubblegum, Bop, Ballad and Boogies, the line-up featured Curtis, Allison, Hardin and bassist Ric Grech. (Grech was a member in 1973 and 1974.) Steven Krikorian, later to record as the new wave artist Tonio K., joined the group as a vocalist shortly thereafter, as did guitarists Albert Lee and Nick van Maarth, replacing Hardin. The 1973 album Remnants and the 1974 album A Long Way from Lubbock featured the sextet of Allison, Curtis, Krikorian, Grech, Lee and van Maarth.

In 1978, the award-winning film The Buddy Holly Story, starring Gary Busey as Holly, presented an engaging but inaccurate depiction of the band's early years. Allison and Mauldin's names were altered to Jesse Charles and Ray Bob Simmons, respectively, to avoid legal action due to their rights being sold to another film production that was also working on Holly's story. Niki Sullivan, Sonny Curtis, Bob Montgomery, Don Guess, and Larry Welborn were written out of the film. The Crickets gave a thumbs down review of the film wherein Allison expressed his dislike on the portrayal of his fictional counterpart Jesse Charles: vulgar, racist, alcoholic, and profane.

In the 1980s, Waylon Jennings called to ask the Crickets to open for him on a tour. They stayed with him for five years. Gordon Payne, one of his guitarists, played lead guitar on a few gigs when Curtis broke his arm. Payne joined the Crickets as lead guitarist and singer when Curtis left. This Allison-Mauldin-Payne lineup toured for about ten years, including visits to the UK and Sweden. They releasing an LP called "Three Piece" on Roller Coaster Records with additional input from Jim Horn (sax), Wayne Jackson (trumpet) and Dennis Burnside (keyboards). In the UK, Paul McCartney recorded the Crickets’ single "T Shirt" in his studio and played piano on the track. During this time a Swedish Television Company recorded a film showing JI, Joe B and Gordon touring the UK and Sweden, as well as at home in Tennessee. It was called My Love Is Bigger than a Cadillac. In 1994, Gordon Payne left, largely retiring from music at that point to spend more time his with family. Sonny Curtis and Glen D. Hardin returned, restoring the group back to a quartet. After recording "Well All Right" with Nanci Griffith, the group toured the UK with Griffith and her Orchestra.

==== 21st century ====
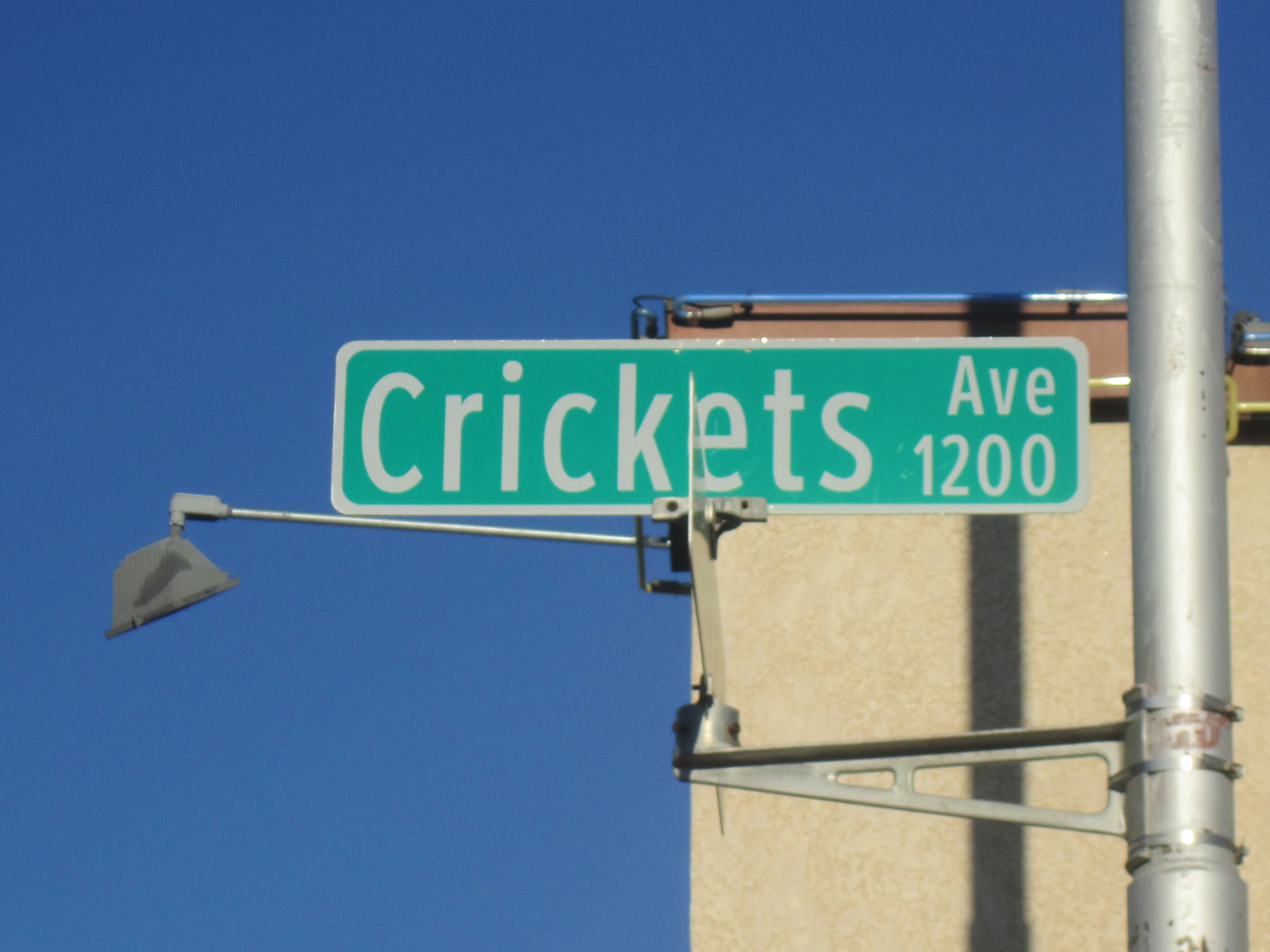
Avenue named for the Crickets in downtown Lubbock, Texas

The Crickets released The Crickets and Their Buddies in 2004, featuring classics from all parts of their career, with performances by several prominent artists, including Eric Clapton, Rodney Crowell, Waylon Jennings, Nanci Griffith, John Prine, Graham Nash, and Bobby Vee. The album was produced and mixed by Greg Ladanyi and included editing and additional mixes by Dave Carlock, Rob Hill, and Rogers Masson. For the album, the Crickets officially consisted of Allison, Curtis and Mauldin; former members Albert Lee (guitar) and Glen D. Hardin (keyboards) also played throughout, and one-time member Steven Krikorian (now known as Tonio K.) was the lead vocalist on two tracks.

On October 28, 2008, the Crickets were inducted into the Musicians Hall of Fame and Museum in Nashville, Tennessee. They performed "Peggy Sue", "Not Fade Away" and "That'll Be the Day" at the ceremony, accompanied by guest guitarist Keith Richards.

On April 14, 2012, the Crickets were inducted into the Rock and Roll Hall of Fame by a special committee charged with correcting the omission of the band with Holly when he was first inducted in 1986. The inducted members were Jerry Allison, Sonny Curtis, Joe B. Mauldin, and Niki Sullivan. The group was unable to attend the ceremony because Mauldin was ill. Mauldin died from cancer on February 7, 2015, in Nashville, Tennessee.

On February 6, 2016, "The Crickets & Buddies" performed in Clear Lake, Iowa, at the Surf Ballroom, the site of Holly's last performance. Members of previous line-ups appeared, including Sonny Curtis, Glen D. Hardin, Albert Lee, Tommy Allsup, Gordon Payne and others. After the show, Allison announced that it was the group's final performance.

Allison died of cancer on August 22, 2022.

Curtis died on September 19, 2025.

== Band members ==
- Jerry Allison – drums (1957–2016; died 2022)
- Buddy Holly – lead vocals, lead and rhythm guitars (1957–1958; died 1959)
- Joe B. Mauldin – double bass, electric bass (1957–1960, 1976–2015; his death)
- Niki Sullivan – rhythm guitar (1957–1958; died 2004)
- Sonny Curtis – lead and rhythm guitars (1958–1960, 1962–1985, 1994–2016); lead vocals (1962–1985, 1994–2016; died 2025)
- Earl Sinks – lead vocals (1958–1960; died 2017)
- David Box - lead vocals (1959-1960; died 1964)
- Tommy Allsup – guitar (1959; died 2017)
- Jerry Naylor – lead vocals (1961–1964; died 2019)
- Glen Hardin – keyboards (1962–1972, 1999–2016); keyboard bass (1962–1972, 2015–2016)
- Ric Grech - bass, violin (1973–1974; died 1990)
- Gordon Payne – lead vocals, lead and rhythm guitars (1985–1994)
