= Jimmy Gilmer =

American musician (1940–2024)

- Born: September 15, 1940; Chicago, Illinois, U.S.
- Died: September 7, 2024 (aged 83) Amarillo, Texas, U.S.
- Occupations: Musician, businessman
- Instrument: Vocals
- Years active: 1959–2022
- Formerly of: The Fireballs

Jimmy Gilmer (September 15, 1940 — September 7, 2024) was an American singer and lead singer for The Fireballs.

== Early life ==
Gilmer was born in Chicago, Illinois, in 1940 but grew up in Amarillo, Texas. In high school he formed his first band, The Jimmy Gilmer Combo, a country group. Jimmy studied music at the Musical Arts Conservator.

== Career ==
Gilmer moved to New Mexico in 1959 and worked as a session singer at Norman Petty Recording Studios. After a jam with The Fireballs, he was asked to join the group. In October 1963, their song "Sugar Shack", went to number one in the US. Jimmy also provided vocals for their upcoming hits "Daisy Petal Pickin'" and "Bottle of Wine".

Jimmy moved to Nashville, Tennessee in 1970 and started a 30 year partnership with United Artists. He later became the vice president of CBS Songs and hired artists such as Richard Leigh, Bobby Goldsboro, Pat Alger and Brad Paisley. He was the president of the Nashville chapter of The Recording Academy from 1989 to 1991 and was a 1992 graduate of Leadership Music. Gilmer retired in 2007 and returned to the Fireballs. His last gig with the Fireballs was in Clear Lake, Iowa, in February 2022.

== Death ==
Gilmer died in Amarillo on September 7, 2024, aged 83. He had been diagnosed with Alzheimer's disease two years before.
