= Keith McCormack =

American singer-songwriter (1940–2015)

Keith McCormack (October 19, 1940 – April 10, 2015) was an American singer, guitarist and songwriter.

McCormack was born in Dalhart, Texas, but was raised in Plainview. He sang and played guitar for the Patio Kids, the Rock 'n' Rollers, the Leen Teens and, finally, the String-A-Longs with Aubrey deCordova and Richard Stephens from 1956 until 1965. The Leen Teens were managed by Norman Petty, who later renamed them the String-A-Longs, and in 1960 they had their biggest hit with "Wheels", which reached number 3. He also recorded at Norman Petty Recording Studios under the alias of Mickey Boyd, Bryan Keith, Keith & Kay (with Juanita Jordan), and lead vocalist for "The Bug Men". He replaced Jimmy Gilmer in a late '60s lineup of The Fireballs; this formation toured but did not record. Actually, they did make 2 45RPMs on The Uni label as the band Colorado. 2 members of Colorado were Stan Lark - Fireballs bassist and George Tomsco - Fireballs lead guitarist. Keith McCormack played rhythm guitar and was lead singer for the group. Their drummer was George Rudiger. The 2 Uni singles are "Country Comfort" B/W "My Babe", and "Moonshine"(Tennessee Wine) B/W "Dogwood". Keith McCormack is listed as composer on the Uni label for "Dogwood".

McCormack co-wrote "Sugar Shack" with his aunt Faye Voss, which was recorded by Jimmy Gilmer and the Fireballs and sold over one million copies in the United States in 1963. It was the biggest selling song of the year and spent five weeks at number 1 on the Billboard Hot 100 from October 12 until November 9, 1963. He also co-wrote their follow-up single, "Daisy Petal Pickin'", which reached #15 on the Billboard chart and #5 in Australia.

He died of a stroke in Springfield, Missouri on April 10, 2015. He was 74.
