= Fender Concert =

Electric guitar combo amplifier

The Fender Concert was a guitar amplifier made by Fender Musical Instruments. Its production can be split over 2 phases. The first of these running from 1960 and until approximately 1965, at which time a typical Fender Concert was priced at $315. During the 1960s, the Concert was for all practical purposes the same amplifier as the Vibrasonic but with four 10" speakers. It was also essentially a Fender Super Reverb without the reverb. In a later phase, the Concert was updated by Paul Rivera in the early 1980s ("concert" and "concert II") and a subsequent 1x12 variant of the Concert amp appeared briefly in the mid-1990s.

== Phase I: The 1960s ==
The Fender Concert has gone through a number of changes over the years, both cosmetically and electronically. The Concert amp was introduced as a replacement for the 4-10 tweed Bassman amplifier. Due to the popularity of the Bassman, both amplifiers were produced concurrently during 1960. Unlike most of the other Professional Series amps however, the Concert (along with Fender Vibrasonic) were not previously offered as tweed-covered models in the 1950s. In late 1959, all of the Professional Series of Amps were debuted at the summer NAMM show. They sported a new light brown Tolex covering, solid state rectifiers (with the exception of the Super Amp), tweed style grill cloth and short-lived metal control knobs (later replaced with the more common brown plastic barrel knobs). In 1961 there was a short run of blond concert amps delivered to Webb music shop in California but the majority were transitioned to standard brown tolex with either maroon/obxlood grill cloth (1961) or the more common yellow or "wheat" cloth (1962). By the end of 1963 and into early 1964, the Concert amp transitioned into black tolex with silver grill along with the rest of the Fender Amplifier line. By approximately 1965, Fender decided on the Fender Super Reverb Amp as the only 4–10 model to continue.

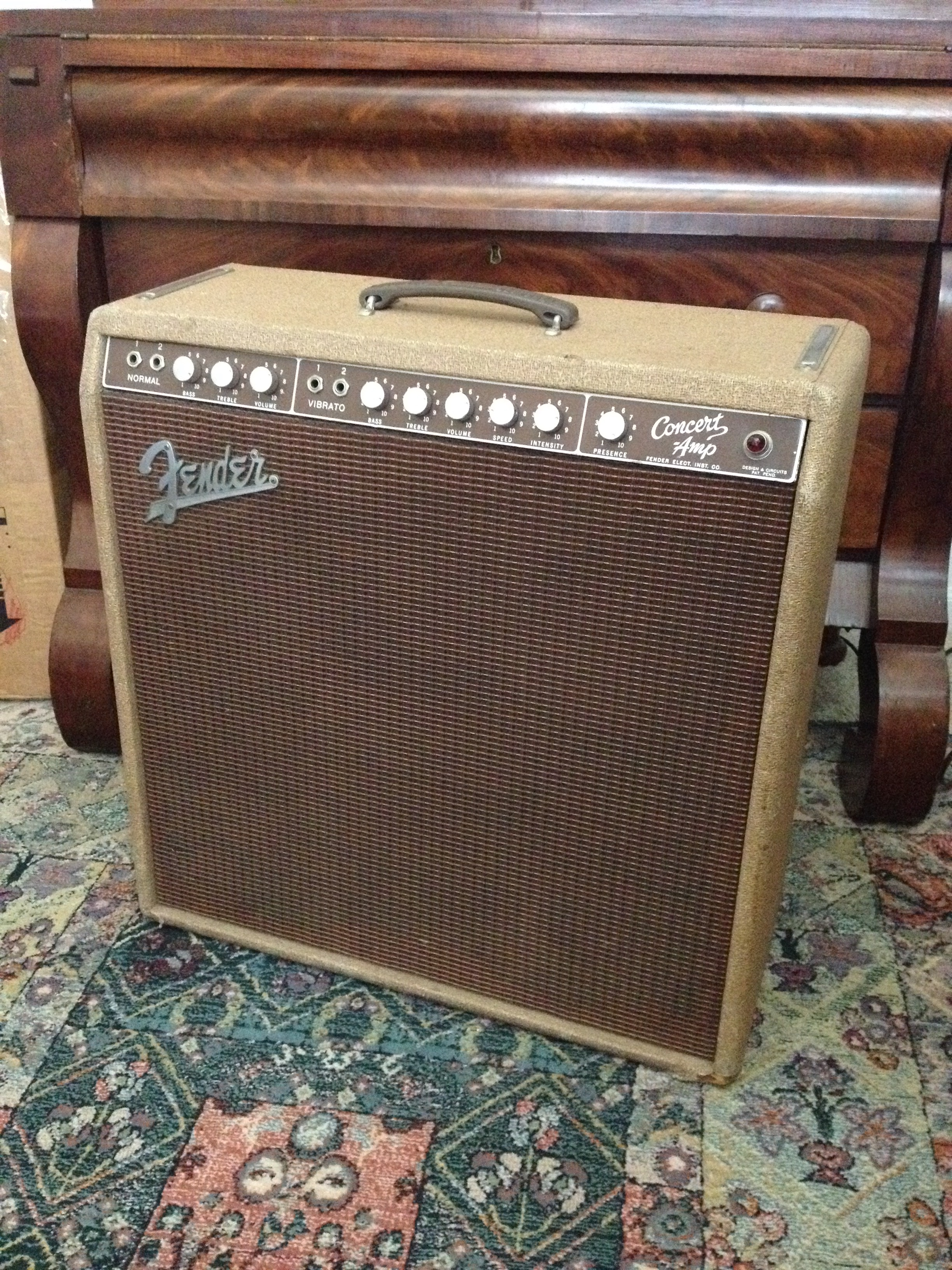
Fender Concert Amp, late 1959, early 1960, model 5G12.

Apart from the variations in tolex and grill cloth color, the design of the Concert Amp as it appeared in the first phase (1960s) was largely consistent. The speaker configuration remained 4-10" speakers usually made by either Jensen or Oxford (for the earlier models) as opposed to Utah or CTS (for the later models). The Concert joined the Fender Twin Amp, and Fender Vibrasonic as the only models with the more robust and expensive "large-iron" output transformers. Over this period, the Concert offered vibrato, bass and treble controls delivering approximately 40 watts of power. There is some variation within the circuit itself corresponding with the model updates for the Concert starting with the 5G12 (late 1959, early 1960) and continuing with the 6G12 (in late 1960, early 1961) and the 6G12-A by 1962 into 1963. The next year the Concert transitioned to the blackface circuit, labeled AB763. The most significant of these updates occurred between the 5G12 which had only 5 preamp tubes and the 6G12 which added another tube for a more pronounced vibrato and more clean headroom. Ironically, the earlier distortion point of the 5G12 was seen by the design team as a design flaw but has become desirable over the decades that followed.

== Phase II: The 1980s and 1990s ==
The 1980s version of the Concert is considerably different than its 1960s sibling. Both were hand-wired, but the newer version was designed by Paul Rivera, who Fender hired to redesign a number of amp models during the decade. The new Concert put out 60 watts into a single 12" speaker, and featured both clean and overdrive channels, a standard channel switch pedal, and traditional tank reverb. The amp was tube (valve, in British English) powered, and featured five 12AX7s (including for gain recovery and reverb). Additionally, two 12AT7s are used for effects loop and the phase inverter and effects loop. Power output is driven through a pair of matched 6L6 power tubes.
