= Wide World Hits =

World Wide Hits

Studio album by The String-A-Longs
- Released: 1968
- Genre: Easy listening, pop
- Label: Atco Records
- Producer: Norman Petty

Wide World Hits is the title of a recording by the instrumental group the String-A-Longs, released on Atco SD 33-241. (According to the aforewikilinked article, the album is actually performed by the Fireballs.)

== Critical response ==
Wayne Harada of the Honolulu Advertiser called it "a plucky good time."

== Track listing ==
=== Side one ===
1. "More" (Riz Ortolani/Nino Oliviero/Norman Newell/M. Ciorciolini)– 2:32
2. "Places I Remember" (Norman Petty)– 2:10
3. "Love Is Blue" (Andre Popp/Pierre Cour)– 2:20
4. "La Pobracita (Poor Little One)" (Note: Note that pobracita is a misspelling of the correct Spanish spelling pobrecita (feminine of 'poor little one').) (George Tomsco)– 1:48
5. "Silence Is Golden" (Bob Gaudio/Bob Crewe)– 3:06
6. "Black Grass" (Ken Jordan/Ken Davis)– 2:20

=== Side two ===
1. "There Is a Mountain" (Donovan Leitch)– 2:12
2. "I'll Be There" (George Tomsco/Barbara Tomsco)– 3:10
3. "Blue Guitar" (Johnny Duncan)– 2:08
4. "Groovin'" (Felix Cavaliere/Eddie Brigati)– 2:33
5. "Black Is Black" (Tony Hayes/Steve Wadey/M. Grainger)– 2:58
6. "Someone Stronger" (George Tomsco/Barbara Tomsco)– 2:40
