= Fender Vibrosonic Reverb =

Guitar amplifier

The Vibrosonic Reverb was a guitar amplifier made by Fender. This silverfaced guitar combo was basically a master volume Twin Reverb equipped with a JBL D-130-F 15" speaker. It was available with 100 watts RMS of power with a 1960s "tailed" Fender logo before its change to a 135 watts RMS combo featuring a "tailless" Fender decal in 1977. The Vibrosonic Reverb was introduced in 1972 and discontinued ten years later.

It was made with a brushed aluminum control plate from 1972 to 1979 and a black control plate from 1980 to 1981. It was then discontinued.

Features included built in vibrato, spring reverb, Line Out jack socket, hum balance and overdrive boost pots (as of 1977). The vibrato was only accessible through a footswitch and the overdrive boost was made use of via a push pull function on the master volume knob.

== See also ==
- Fender Vibrasonic
