= The String-A-Longs =

American popular music instrumental group

The String-A-Longs were an American instrumental group from Plainview, Texas, United States. The band consisted of Richard Stephens and Jimmy Torres alternating lead guitars, Keith McCormack on rhythm guitar, Aubrey de Cordova, bass guitar and Don Allen, drums. They are best known for their hit single, "Wheels", which reached No. 3 on the Billboard Hot 100 in and was the number 8 single of 1961.

== History ==
The band was formed under the name Patio Kids in 1956 by McCormack, Stephens and de Cordova, who were Plainview High School classmates. They were then joined by drummer Charles Jay Edmiston and, in early 1957, and they rechristened themselves the Rock ‘n’ Rollers with the arrival of another guitar player, Jimmy Torres.

They began recording in Amarillo, Texas, as the Rock'n Rollers, under their first manager Johnny Voss, Keith McCormack's Uncle. Their first single was on the Ven label. In the later fifties they began recording at Norman Petty Recording Studios in Clovis, New Mexico. McCormack’s mother, Glynn Thames, paid for their first recording session. Those recordings were subsequently sold to Imperial Records, but the songs did not get much play. Allen then replaced Edmiston who left to join the military. The group changed its name to The Leen Teens and recorded "So Shy" and "Dreams About You," which also met with little success on the Imperial label. In 1960, they signed with Petty, who became their manager and brought their songs to Warwick Records. Petty suggested changing their name to The String-A-Longs.

"Wheels," was released in December 1960 and became a hit, peaking at number 3 on the Billboard Hot 100. The record was the number 8 single of 1961 according to Billboard. The track reached number 8 in the UK Singles Chart. It sold over one million copies, and was awarded a gold disc.

Warwick Records declared bankruptcy in 1962. The band had filed suit for royalties. McCormack claimed the band was owed $700,000 (the equivalent of nearly $7 million in 2004).

There are more than one hundred cover versions of "Wheels," including by Joe Loss ("Wheels Cha-Cha") and Billy Vaughn.

The String-A-Longs followed up "Wheels" with "Brass Buttons" (U.S. No. 35), "Should I," and "Replica." In 1962 they moved to Dot Records and disbanded by 1964. Petty continued to own the String-A-Longs name, and to avoid confusion between the instrumental sound of The Fireballs and that group's current vocal hit "Bottle of Wine," it was decided to reuse the String-A-Longs name for the LP Wide World Hits on Atco in 1968. This is actually the Fireballs performing the music under the String-A-Longs moniker.

The original String-A-Longs lineup reunited for the Clovis Music Festival in 2006.

Keith McCormack, singer, guitarist and songwriter, died of a stroke on April 10, 2015, at the age of 74. Both drummer Don Allen and guitarist Richard Stephens died in 2019; lead guitarist Jimmy Torres died in 2023.

== Singles ==
Year	A-side/B-side Both sides from same album except where indicated	Peak chart positions					Album	Note
Year	A-side/B-side Both sides from same album except where indicated	US Billboard			US Cashbox	UK	Album	Note
Year	A-side/B-side Both sides from same album except where indicated	Pop	AC	R&B	US Cashbox	UK	Album	Note
1961	"Wheels" b/w "Tell the World" (first pressings) "Am I Asking Too Much" (later pressings); Both B-sides are non-album tracks	3	–	19	4	8	Pick a Hit	
1961	"Tell the World" b/w "For an Angel"	–	–	–	–	–	Non-album tracks	
1961	"Brass Buttons" b/w "Panic Button" (from Pick a Hit)	35	–	–	44	–	Matilda	
1961	"Should I" b/w "Take a Minute"	42	10	–	54	–	Non-album tracks	
1961	"Mina Bird" b/w "Scottie"	–	–	–	–	–	Non-album tracks	
1962	"Theme for Twisters" b/w "Nearly Sunrise" (from Pick a Hit)	–	–	–	–	–	Non-album tracks	
1962	"Twistwatch" b/w "Sunday"	–	–	–	–	–	Non-album tracks	
1962	"My Blue Heaven" b/w "Spinnin' My Wheels" (non-album track)	–	–	–	–	–	Matilda	
1962	"Matilda" b/w "Replica" (non-album track)	133	–	–	–	–	Matilda	
1963	"Happy Melody" b/w "Heartaches"	–	–	–	–	–	Non-album tracks	
1964	"My Babe" b/w "Myna Bird"	–	–	–	–	–	Non-album tracks	
1965	"Caravan" b/w "Mathilda"	–	–	–	–	–	Non-album tracks	
1969	"Popi" (non-album track) b/w "Places I Remember" (from Wide World Hits)	–	–	–	–	–	Non-album tracks	By The Fireballs

== Bibliography ==
- Joel Whitburn, The Billboard Book of Top 40 Hits. 7th edn, 2000
