= Norman Petty =

American musician and record producer (1927–1984)

- Petty and his wife, Vi

Background information
- Born: May 25, 1927; Clovis, New Mexico, U.S.
- Died: August 15, 1984 (aged 57) Lubbock, Texas, U.S.
- Occupations: Musician; songwriter; record producer
- Instrument: Hammond organ
- Years active: 1947–1984
- Label: Nor-Va-Jak Music
- Formerly of: Norman Petty Trio

Norman Petty (May 25, 1927 – August 15, 1984) was an American musician, record producer, publisher, and radio station owner. He is considered to be one of the founding fathers of early rock & roll. With Vi Ann Petty—his wife and vocalist—he founded the Norman Petty Trio.

== Biography ==
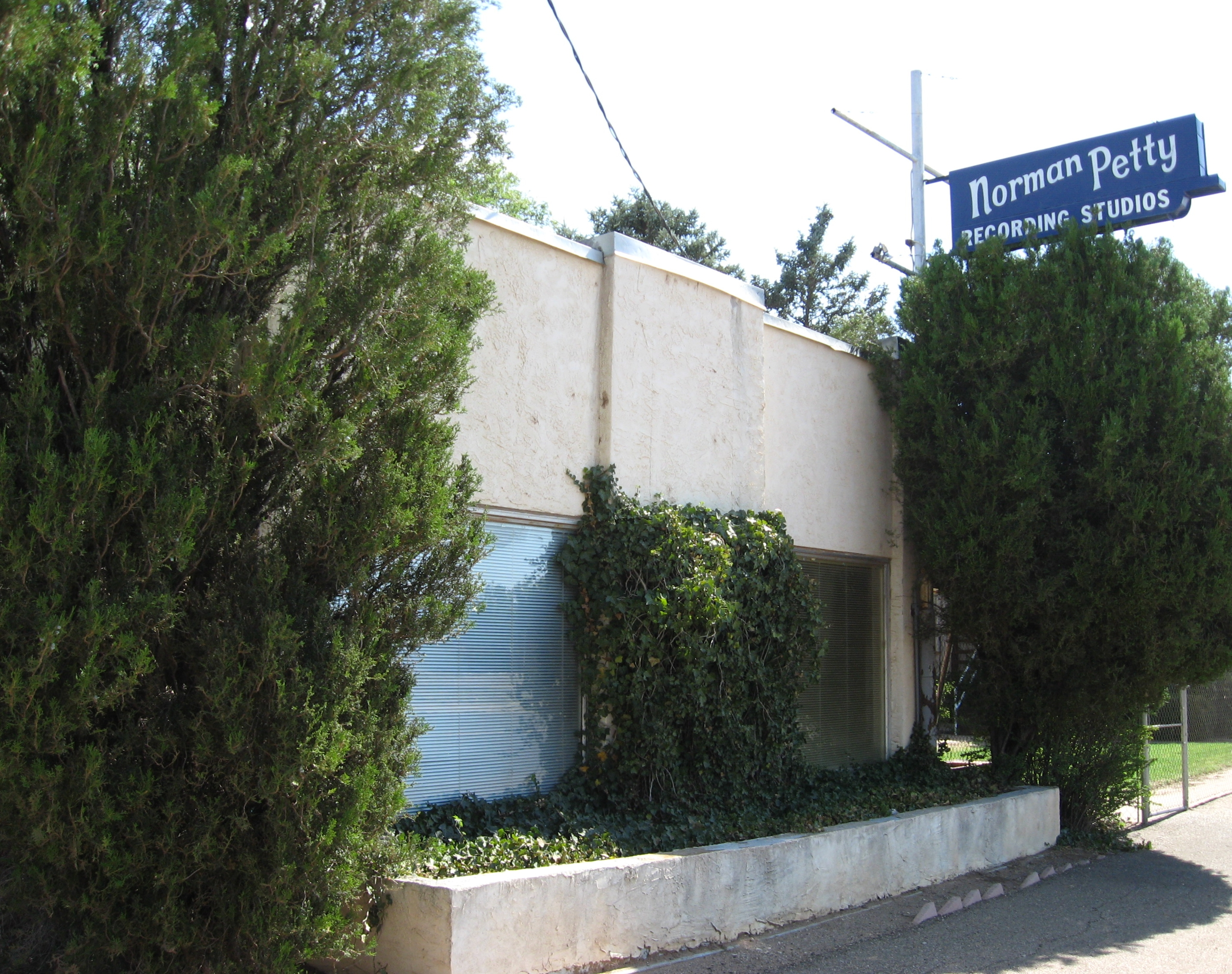
Norman Petty Recording Studios, Clovis, New Mexico

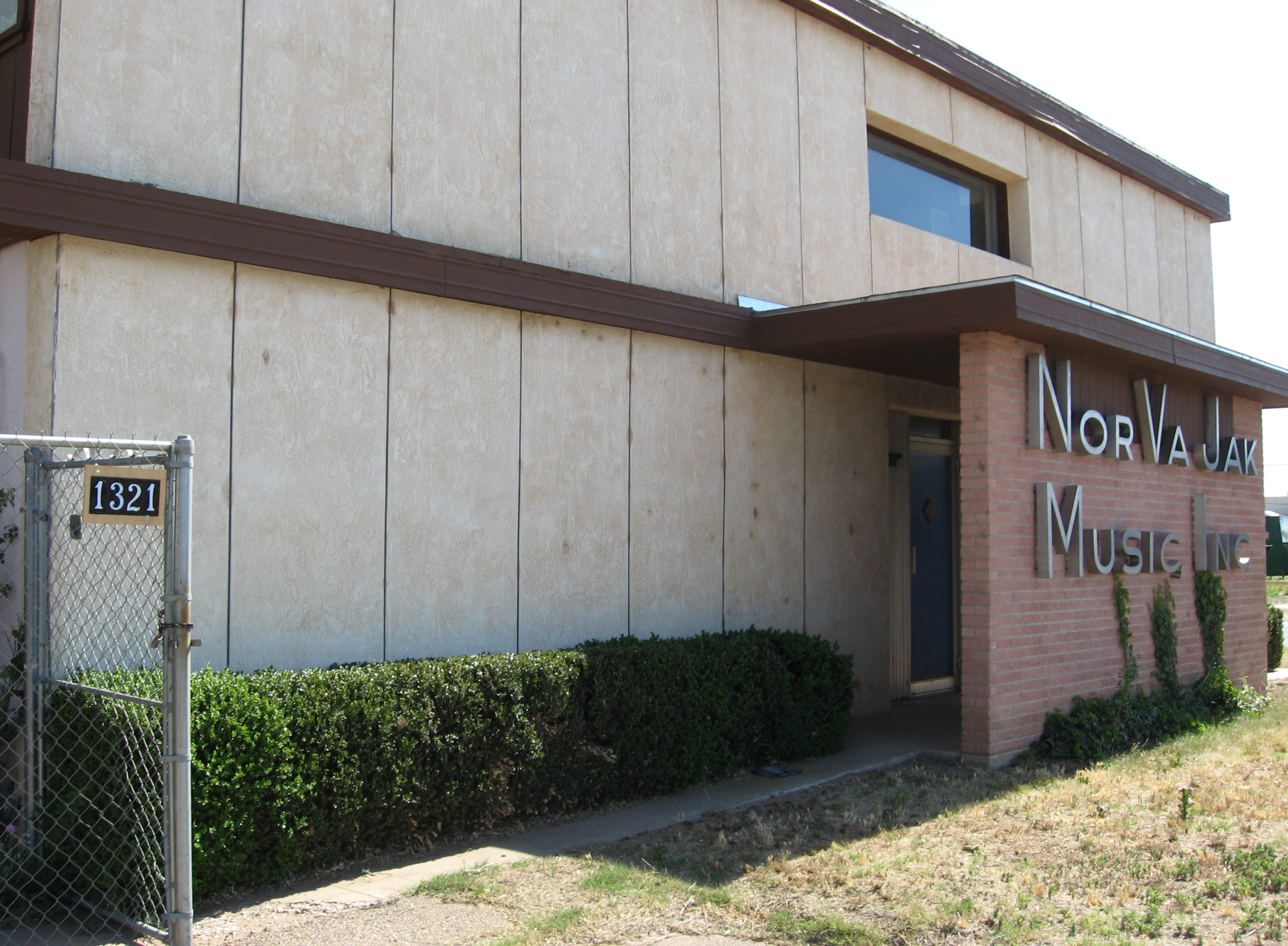
NorVaJak Music, Clovis, New Mexico

Petty was born in the small town of Clovis, New Mexico. He began playing piano at a young age. While in high school, he regularly performed on a 15-minute show on a local radio station. After his graduation in 1945, he was drafted into the United States Air Force. When he returned, he married his high-school sweetheart Violet Ann Brady on June 20, 1948. The couple lived briefly in Dallas, Texas, where Petty worked as a part-time engineer at Jim Beck Studio. Eventually, they moved back to their hometown of Clovis.

Petty and his wife, Vi, founded the Norman Petty Trio, with guitarist Jack Vaughn. Due to the local success of their independent debut release of "Mood Indigo", they landed a recording contract with RCA Records and sold half a million copies of the recording, and were voted Most Promising Instrumental Group of 1954 by Cashbox magazine. In 1957, their song "Almost Paradise" hit number 18, and Petty won his first BMI writers' award. The song had various cover versions released, with Roger Williams' version selling the best.

Despite the success of his own records, Petty began construction of his Clovis recording studio in late 1954. The new studio was state of the art, estimated to have cost around $100,000 (US$1,198,885 in 2025 dollars). "Throughout his life, Petty remained a member of the Central Baptist Church in Clovis, a religious man who advised all of his acts to carry a bible with them on tour and forbade alcohol and cigarettes (and even swearing) within the studio complex."

With the success of "Almost Paradise", the structure was completed in mid-1957. In his original 7th Street studio, aside from songs for his own musical group, he also produced singles (several which were hits) for West Texas musicians Roy Orbison, Buddy Knox, Jimmy Bowen, Waylon Jennings, Charlie "Sugartime" Phillips, Sonny West, Carolyn Hester, Johnny "Peanuts" Wilson, and Billy Walker. Sizeable hits such as "Torquay", "Bulldog", "Quite A Party", "Sugar Shack", "Bottle of Wine" all by The Fireballs,"Wheels", and "Brass Buttons" by the String-A-Longs were recorded at Petty's studio.

Due to the success with instrumental groups, Petty was a reputable producer for bands of that genre and his Clovis Studio was one of the top "go-to" studios for the guitar instrumental (surf) sound in the early 1960s. Notable musicians who visited during the 1960s were the Champs (featuring members Seals & Crofts and Glen Campbell), JD Souther (& the Cinders), Johnny Duncan, and Eddie Reeves.

Petty produced a number of Canadian recording artists, including Wes Dakus and the Rebels, Barry Allen, Gainsborough Gallery, and the Happy Feeling, all of whom had chart success in their homeland. Norman also produced sessions in England for artists such as Brian Poole & the Tremeloes and Buddy Britten, and in Belgium for Roman Reed, Merino Costa, and the Pebbles, among others. Throughout the 1950s and 1960s, recordings produced by Petty, in various musical styles, were issued by virtually every major record label in the United States and Canada, with numerous regional successes.

Petty produced the majority of Buddy Holly's studio recordings from 1956 through 1958 at his Clovis studio, with the remainder being recorded at Bell Sound Studios in New York. According to Petty, he took an "immediate liking to Buddy from the very first moment" they met, although in an earlier interview with journalist Norman Mark, he had delivered a possibly more pragmatic response:

"My first impression of him was of a person ultra-eager to succeed. He wore a T-shirt and Levis. Really he was unimpressive to look at but impressive to hear. In fact businessmen around here asked me why I was interested in a hillbilly like Holly, and I told them I thought Buddy was a diamond in the rough".

Petty was asked by Holly to act as the band's "personal manager after "That'll Be The Day" started to break in July 1957", although he "signed no management contract with either Buddy or the Crickets[,] who were therefore free to leave whenever they wished". "In addition to taking control of Holly's career and finances, he added his name to the songwriting credits—a dubious but not uncommon practice in those days". Other sources claim that this "was unusual for the 1950s, but today is quite common and even the standard practice in some genres." Petty "was an innovative producer who charged a fixed fee per recording rather than the hourly rate that was standard then and now, and did not take a fixed payment from mechanical royalties. To compensate for his risks and to recognize his contribution to creating the song, Petty was often listed as a cowriter of the songs he produced, and the songs were published by his music publishing company, Nor-Va-Jak Music. ... No doubt Petty took risks as the producer and deserved greater compensation for his efforts, but his percentage of performance royalties was greater than Holly's[,] and the question is whether this was more than Petty deserved. Those who would defend Petty's greater share would point to the fact that Holly and the Crickets did not produce any hits before they recorded with Petty in his ... studio." Larry Holly, Buddy's brother, acknowledged that "Norman was responsible for getting Buddy out."

However, Petty was also accused of withholding "royalty payments to Holly", who eventually found out that the band's "recording royalties had not been banked under their name but under Petty's." However, at the time, "records sold in shops for between just sixty-nine and eighty-nine cents each, while the royalty was often as low as one cent per side." While "unable to deny that they were due sizeable sums, Petty kept on stressing the slowness with which record-companies, in particular, paid out artists' royalties." In 1958, after "Holly suffered disappointing sales for such tunes as "Rave On" and "It's So Easy!", he grew resentful of Petty's control. The cash-strapped musician and his new wife, Maria Elena [Santiago], visited Petty at the studio to end their partnership, and seek his unpaid royalties." Santiago insisted that Holly get his "finances in order" before she would marry him, stating: "I don't want to sit around all the time, waiting for handouts from Norman Petty." She "recounted that Petty told his young protege, "You know what, Buddy? I'm gonna say this to you. I'd rather see you dead than to give you the money now."

According to Santiago, Petty "tried to break us up ... He told Buddy not to marry me because I was a whorish kind of woman, that I'd slept with all kinds of other men who'd come in to Peer-Southern. Buddy knew that wasn't true, of course. He got so mad, he wanted to leave Norman right there and then." According to Petty's recollection of the meeting, "Elena did all the talking. She said, 'Buddy and I have decided that Buddy can do better—that you're not fit for Buddy's manager.' And I said, 'What's this—is it something I've done?' She said, 'It's what you haven't done—you haven't done near enough for him.'" Petty would recall the split rather more amicably, claiming that "When I asked Buddy if there was anything that I had done to cause the split—I think the question was answered by his wife that time. It wasn’t necessarily anything I had done, I had not done enough to exploit Buddy, the world did not know enough about Buddy Holly. I was not doing a competent job of promoting him as an artist. That to me was the basic reason. ... [A]s far as musically speaking goes, I don’t think there ever was a rift between Buddy and myself". The remaining Crickets, Joe B. Mauldin and Jerry Allison, chose to remain with Petty.

After Holly's death, Petty was put in charge of overdubbing unfinished Holly recordings and demos at the request of the Holly family, which resulted in chart success overseas.

In 1999, Holly's widow, Maria Elena, along with Holly's siblings, filed a lawsuit against MCA Inc. in which she alleged that Petty "conspired with MCA to defraud the Holly heirs." It was eventually determined through extensive auditing that "MCA owed the Petty estate and the Holly heirs a combined $251,325 in additional royalties".

Petty purchased the Mesa Theater on Main Street in Clovis in 1960. In 1963, he launched the FM radio station KTQM starting as an easy-listening station, later switching to country-and-western music, and then in 1968 to top-40 rock. The country genre had local appeal, so he applied for a new station license and started KWKA 680 AM in 1971, airing country-and-western music. Petty ran both stations until 1979. The stations were sold by Curry County Broadcasting to Zia Broadcasting in 2010.

Petty died in Lubbock, Texas, in August 1984, of leukemia. Later in 1984, he was posthumously named Clovis Citizen of the Year. His wife, Vi, died in March 1992. She helped start the "Norman and Vi Petty Music Festival" in Clovis in 1987, which ran until 1997. It featured many artists who had recorded at the Clovis studio and also popular hit makers. Robert Linville requested the name from the Chamber of Commerce and started the festivals again from 1998 until his death in 2001.

Norman and Vi were given awards for "Outstanding Graduate Accomplishment" (in the classes of 1945 and 1946, respectively) by the Clovis Municipal Schools Foundation and Alumni Association in April 2011. The awards are presented to Clovis High School graduates for achievement in their sphere of business; the recipients are chosen because their strength of character and citizenship, to serve as models for today's CHS students. The plaques were given to Vi's relative Nick Brady, who turned them over to Kenneth Broad of the Petty estate to display during studio tours. The original 7th Street Studio is available for tours by appointment only.

The King of Clovis, a book about Petty by Frank Blanas, was published in 2014. Blanas argues that Petty's reputation as "arguably the No. 1 villain in the Buddy Holly story" has been exaggerated, and claims that he "drove royalty rates higher so everyone could share in the profits; it was a 'win or lose together' mentality that made hit records and, in theory, should have been successful for all involved. But Norman never foresaw an industry of record bootlegging, freebie promo abuse, plugging payola and slush funds. Royalties were consumed in the form of bourbon, danced away on the laps of DJs, pilfered through organized rackets, [and] spent on gifts for executives". The idea "that Petty stole the money has been widely shared by various authors, artists and, subsequently, the general public. The fact is, though, that many in the 1950s record business were mobsters, racketeers and money launderers. Most writers forget that there were key middle men between the retailer and Clovis. Norman, as a small independent music businessman, was often dealing with professional crooks with known mob ties[,] and was at their mercy in the same way as exploited artists."

Petty's Nor-Va-Jak record label was revived in 2016–2023 as "Nor-Va-Jak Music", with authorization from Norman Petty Studios, for the purpose of reissuing Petty productions that were not previously available in digital form.
