= Fender Twin =

Guitar amplifier

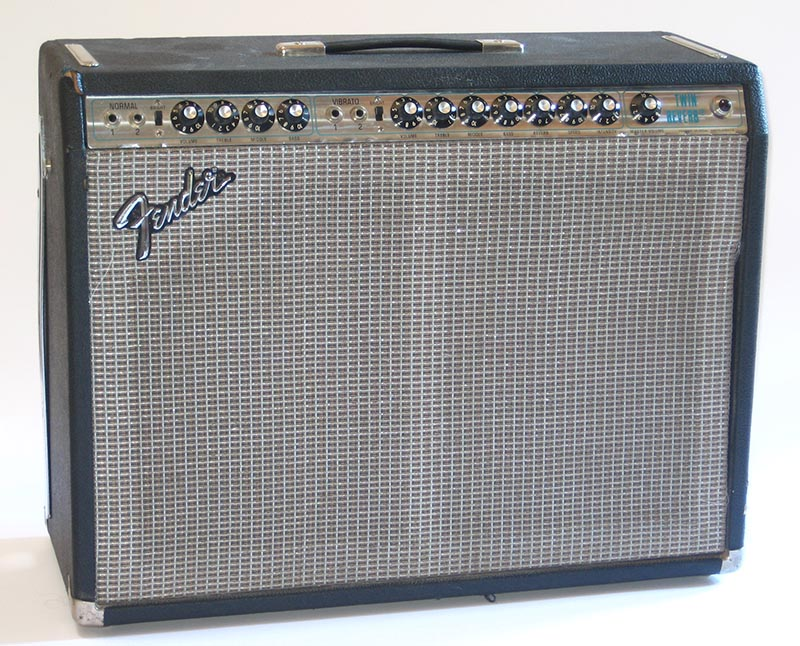
A 1973 Fender Twin Reverb amplifier

The Fender Twin and Twin Reverb are guitar amplifiers made by Fender Musical Instruments Corporation. The Twin was introduced in 1952, two years before Fender began selling Stratocaster electric guitars. The amps are known for their characteristically clean tone.

The Twin has seen a number of revisions since its introduction, both internal and external, with its designs sometimes varying greatly from one year to the next. Several variations on the amp's original design have been produced through the years, including the Twin Reverb, the Super Twin, the Twin Reverb II, the Twin Reverb '65 Reissue and the Twin Reverb 68’ Custom Reissues. The Cyber Twin, which combined a tube amp with a digital processor, was introduced in January 2001.

Many notable musicians have used Fender Twin amplifiers, including Mark Knopfler, David Gilmour, Chuck Berry, Buddy Holly, George Tomsco of The Fireballs, Mike Oldfield, The Beatles (1968 Twin Reverb amps using the AC568 circuit), Jimi Hendrix, Eric Clapton, Peter Green, Jeremy Spencer, Danny Kirwan, Keith Richards, Mick Taylor, Steve Jones (Sex Pistols), Jerry Garcia (Grateful Dead), Eric Johnson, Joe Bonamassa, Junior Brown, Kurt Cobain and Tommy Emmanuel.

== History ==
The Fender Twin has gone through a number of changes over the years, both cosmetically and electronically.

=== The 1950s: the Tweed era ===
==== "Wide Panel" Twin ====
The original version was an all-tube combo amplifier with dual 12" speakers and two 6L6 tubes for a rated output of 25 watts.

==== "Narrow Panel" Twin ====
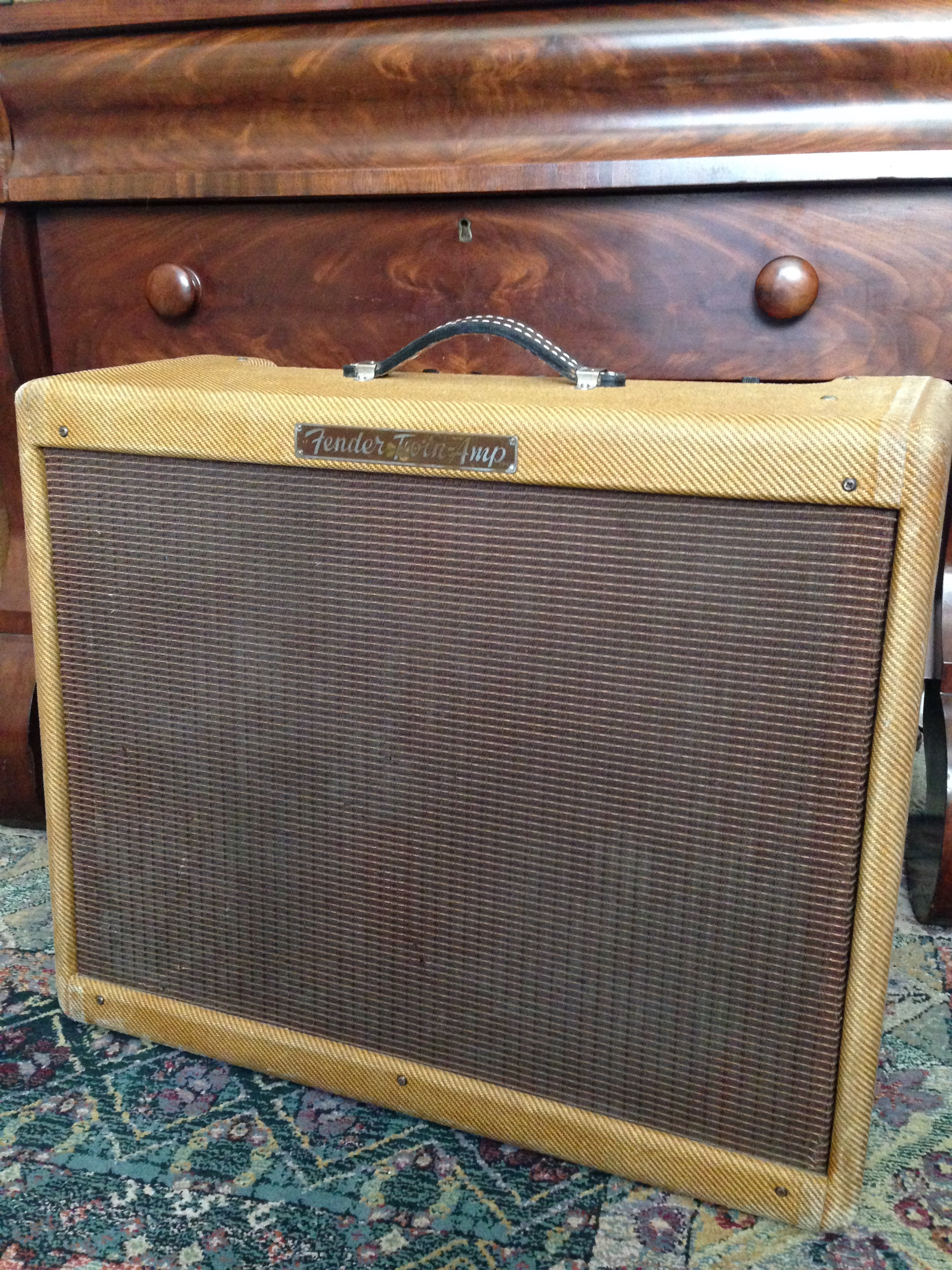
1955 Twin-Amp, model 5E8. Dual rectifiers and 6L6 power tubes, twin 12" speakers.

After the preceding looks of the early 1950s (TV front from 1950 to 51/2; wide panel '52–54), Leo Fender changed the cabinet design again, this time opting for no extra wood on the front of the amp, except for the narrow top and bottom panels that hold the baffle board to the cabinet.

The early models of the larger "narrow-panel" tweeds are also remarkable for their refined electronics whose circuit design incorporated dual 5U4 rectifiers in the Twin and Bassman models, another improvement given Fender's quest for a louder, cleaner amplifier. The entire line of Fender amplifiers from 1955 to 1959 (later for smaller models and Bassman) was uniform in this look—tweed or "airline linen" covering with a maroon with gold stripe woven saran grill cloth. The 1×12 Deluxe-Amp, the 1×15 Pro-Amp and the 3×10 Bandmaster are exceptional in dynamics and tone.

Like its predecessors, the narrow panel tweed Fender amplifiers used Jensen Alnico V Concert Series Speakers, for the most part. By the end of the decade, a JBL 15" speaker was available on special order for the Pro model.

==== "Big Box" Twin ====
It was modified in 1957 for more volume, switching to four 5881 power tubes with the more efficient long-tailed pair phase inverter for a power increase to 80W. This "hi-powered," tweed-covered design continued into early 1960, after the other Professional Series of Fender amplifiers had made the transition to the modern brownface design.

The upgraded 5F8 Twin-amp of 1957 with its complement of four military grade 5881's was briefly rectified with a tall mercury vapor 83 tube and special tube socket. Due to its volatile nature if broken, it was quickly superseded with a GZ34 rectifier but not duly noted on the tube chart until the second production.

The final 5F8-A Twin-Amp version was released in 1958 and produced into early 1960. The 5F series Twin utilized heavy duty Concert Series Jensen P12-N Alnico V blue-dome loudspeakers (conservatively rated in 1957 at only 18 watts apiece). These tweed Twin amps would deliver peaks up to 80 plus watts of power when turned high. With such bursts of volume energy, often these Jensen speakers would fail, and sometimes even burn out (smoke) voice coils. Many well used Twins have replaced speakers today. Keith Richards has used these late model, high-power Twin amps on Rolling Stones tours with his own special design Celestion Alnico (similar to the G12-80) speakers to insure optimum live efficiency. Today, the 5F8 series Fender Twin amps command the highest price of any Fender amp ever built.

=== The 1960s: the Tolex era ===
==== Blonde Twin-Amp ====
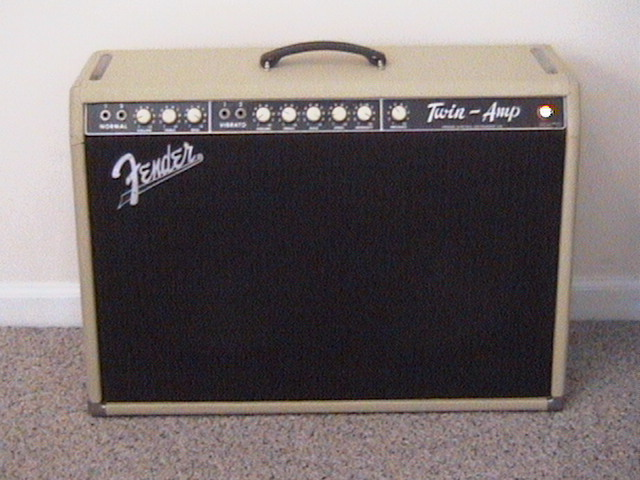
1960–61 Fender Twin-Amp in blonde (or white) tolex with an oxblood colored grille cloth.

The exact plight of the Twin-Amp during the months between January and May 1960, however, remains open to considerable speculation, debate and study. The prevailing explanation is that production was temporarily interrupted during these months as they coincide with the debut of Fender's new "flagship" or top of the line amplifier, the Fender Vibrasonic-Amp. Nonetheless, Fender Musical Instrument Co. kept the image of the Twin-Amp before potential consumers during this short period. The image of the Twin-Amp in the 1960 Fender Catalog has been the subject of considerable scrutiny.

The re-emergence of the Twin-Amp in mid 1960 revealed a new aesthetic design that would become prominent among Fender's top of the line amplifiers, with the exception of the Vibrasonic-Amp. By 1961, the Bandmaster, the Bassman and the newly debuted Showman were all covered in the new look exemplified by the late 1960 Twin-Amp: blonde tolex and maroon or "oxblood" grille cloth. The Twin-Amp of this period (late 1960–1963) was manufactured with a variety of speakers including Jensen, Oxford and JBL designs. This variation lends support to the idea that the 80-watt circuit was beyond the power handling capacity of the speakers of the late 1950s. After a slight change in appearance, from the rough blonde tolex and maroon grille appearance to a smooth blonde tolex with a gold grille cloth, the Twin-Amp was replaced with the Twin Reverb-Amp in 1963.

==== Blackface Twin Reverb ====
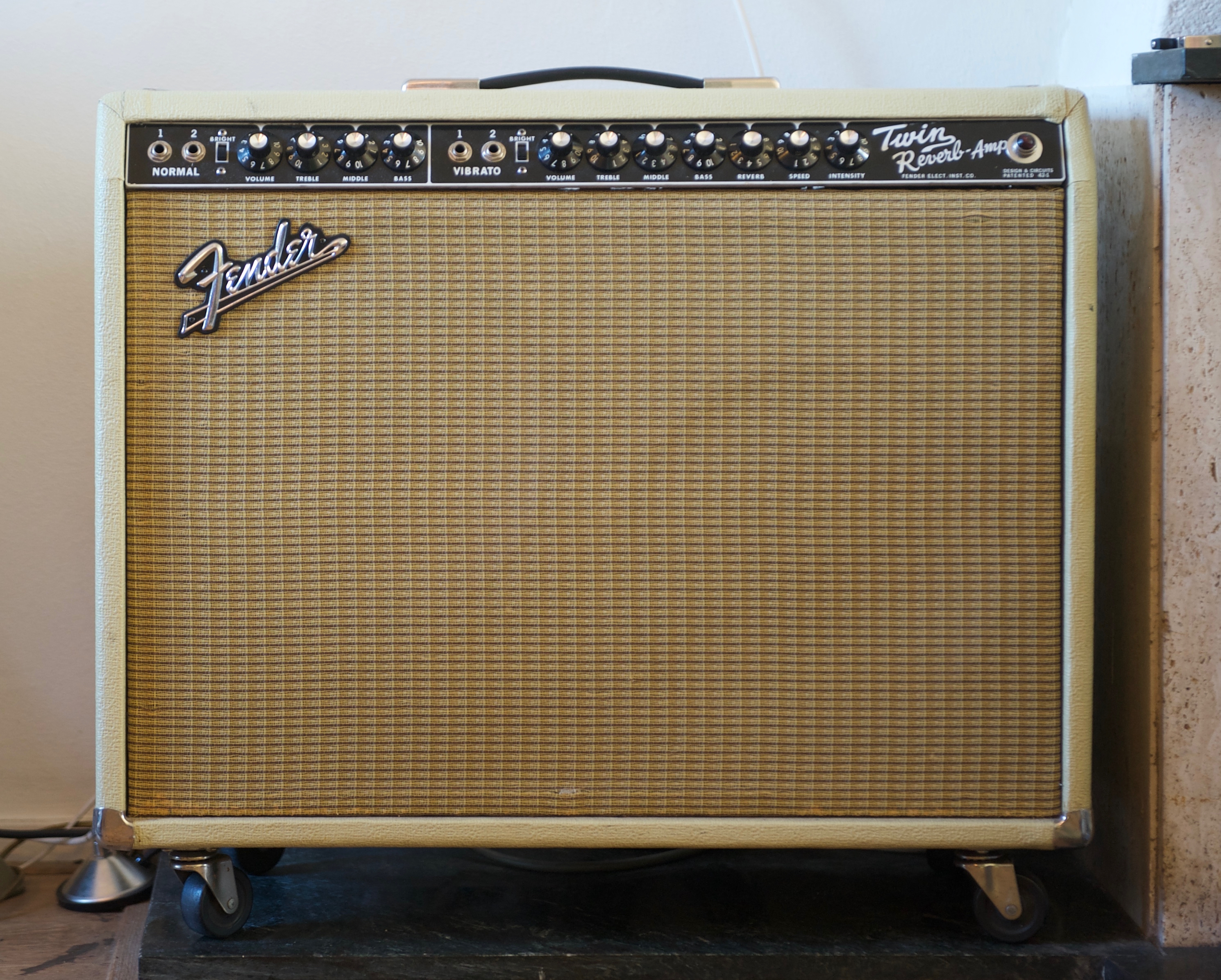
1965 Fender Twin Reverb Blonde, based on the AB763 circuit, two Jensen loudspeakers and a gold grille cloth

During the blackface era of Fender amplifiers from 1963 to 1967, the amps had black faceplates, black tolex covering on the cabinet, and neutral to slightly amber tinted silver sparkle grill cloth with a small ribbed rectangular pattern. The Twin now had an onboard spring reverb tank and was renamed the Twin Reverb. The Fender Twin Reverb is considered a standard model for players seeking a clean sound, and it is especially known for the quality of its built-in spring reverb.

Two transition prototype 1963 Twin Reverb amps have been found in both brown and blonde Tolex covering. The brown one still had the harmonic tremolo and early Vibroverb reverb circuitry with an extra tube and rear dwell control. The blonde Twin Reverb Leo gave to steel player Red Rhodes for testing purposes at the famous Palomino Club (North Hollywood). Performing in the house band with band leader Gene Davis, Red played his Pedal 1000 steel and Twin Reverb live, and on some popular TV shows including Cal's Corral (I'll eat a bug! Cal Worthington), Star Route, and Country Music Time.

Fender's 1963 product flyer featured a flat logo, black Tolex amp, while their 1963 full-line catalog showed a raised logo amp on the cover, both with a grey Saran grill. The first production Twin Reverb models used an unusual 7355 power tube (weaker cousin to the 6L6) as with their concurrent smooth blonde, blackface Fender Showman amplifier.

During this time the amplifier's output was rated at 85 watts into a 4-ohm speaker load. The circuit used is commonly known as the AB763 circuit. Fender Twin Reverb amplifiers use four output tubes, of the 6L6GC type. They use six preamp tubes, consisting of four 7025/12AX7 types and two 12AT7 types. All Twin Reverbs feature a solid-state rectifier.

The Fender Twin Reverb has two independent channels, labeled Normal and Vibrato. The control have black-skirted knobs numbered from 1 to 10. The Normal channel has two inputs, a "bright" switch (which compensates for loss of brightness through the volume control when the control is set lower than about "6" on its 1–10 scale), a volume control, treble, middle and bass tone controls. The Vibrato channel has a duplication of the same controls as the normal channel, plus the addition of reverb, vibrato speed and intensity controls. Reverb is accomplished with a tube/transformer driven low impedance spring reverb tank (made by the Hammond company) or its spin-off company Accutronics. The addition of the reverb circuit requires an additional "gain" stage in the preamp, and as such, the Vibrato channel is capable of a bit more distortion when the volume is set high. Vibrato (tremolo) is accomplished with what is known as a "vibrato bug" by Fender amplifier repairmen. The vibrato bug is a four-wire device consisting of a neon tube and light-dependent variable resistor, packaged in a short section of black tubing. It resembles a water bug, with slender wispy legs. The tube generated vibrato oscillator pulsates the neon light, which varies the resistance on the resistive element. That variable resistance is applied to the audio signal on the Vibrato channel, creating a pulsating increase and decrease of that channel's volume. The speed controls varies the rate of the oscillator. The depth control limits the amount of application the variable resistor has on the audio signal.

The front panel also has a bright red pilot light lens (better known as "pilot lamp jewel" for its multiple triangular-shaped facets), covering the pilot light (made by the Chicago Miniature Lamp Co.). Other color schemes (amber, white, green, purple and blue) are also available. Rear panel controls include a 2.5-amp "slo-blo" fuse, an accessory AC outlet, an earth ground selection switch, on/off and standby switches. Additionally there are two speaker output jacks, and jacks for footswitches to activate/deactivate the reverb and vibrato effects. The black faceplates of the "blackface" era Twin Reverb will say either "Fender Electric Instruments" (FEI) or "Fender Musical Instruments", (FMI) depending on the date of manufacture. Units made before the takeover of Fender by CBS in 1965 will be marked Fender Electric Instruments, and be worth a bit more on the collectors market.

The more common speakers found in Fender Twin Reverb amps include Jensen C12Ns, Oxford 12T6s, JBL D-120Fs (an upgrade at the factory), Altec Lansing 417-8Cs, Utahs and, in later years, CTS and Eminence models. Some Twins were fitted with EVM 12L variant speakers known as EVM 12Fs. Unlike most Electrovoice speakers, they were fitted with metal dustcovers like the JBL D-120Fs.

Twin Reverb amplifiers came standard with "tilt back legs" which allowed the amplifier to be tilted at an angle backwards, so the speakers faced at a more upward angle, promoting better distribution of their output to an audience when placed on a low stage.

==== Silverface Twin Reverb ====
In 1967 the Fender amplifier line switched from the original black faceplate to a new brushed aluminum faceplate with light blue labels (except the Bronco, which has red) and changed the color of the grillcloth from silver grey to silver with sparkling blue threads embedded within it, ushering in the Silverface era. Other blackface cosmetic features were retained. The first silverface Twins used the blackface AB763 circuit until May 1968, when Fender switched to the AC568. Since the tube complement was the same, Fender just used up their stock of printed tube charts saying AB763 until they ran out.

The earliest silverface Twin Reverbs, along with all other silverface models, had an aluminum frame (trim) surrounding the sparkling blue grillcloth from late 1967 to 1969. Early silverface amplifiers made between 1967 and 1968 had black lines on the brushed aluminum faceplate, still retaining the '60s "tailed" design on the amp logo, installed on the upper left side of the grillcloth. This feature was offered on models produced prior to the "tailless" period in 1973. Some later models came with an unusual silver grillcloth with sparkling orange threads ("orange sparkle"); a black grillcloth was even fitted on some production runs. During the silverface period, the Twin Reverb's chassis and AA769 circuit was shared by the Dual Showman Reverb, effectively producing the Twin Reverb in a head form, although the matching speaker cabinet for the Dual Showman Reverb sported a pair of 15-inch JBL speakers rather than 12-inch.

In 1972 a master volume was added, then in late '73 it was fitted with a push pull "boost" or acentric potentiometer in the master volume position. The rating of the amplifier's output power was upgraded to 100 watts and between 1977–1982 an ultra linear output transformer was used, increasing the power to 135 watts. A Hum Balance pot and Line Out jack for recording were added at this time.

=== Twin Reverb II ===
In 1982 the Twin Reverb II was introduced to compete with Mesa Boogie's products; it had an output rating of 105 watts and a return to Blackface era cosmetics albeit with a different, channel-switching cascading gain circuit with a more modern mid-range voicing and without the 'traditional' vibrato. The Twin Reverb II was produced until 1986, and was available as a head (amplifier alone) or 2×12 combo. The circuits for this series of 1982 Fender amplifiers were designed by Paul Rivera; the 60w Concert amplifier was by far the most successful in terms of sales, but all models in this range and the next are highly sought after by collectors and players.

=== "Red Knob" Twin ===
The Twin Reverb II was replaced by The Twin, commonly referred to, though incorrectly as, the "Evil Twin" (Fender has only referred to the "TWIN AMP" or the '94 Twin Amp as being the "Evil Twin", not the red knob Twin) due to the addition of both a separate gain channel and a switchable overdrive on the clean, in 1987. It featured a dual output switch, allowing the user to select either 25 watts or 100 watts of output. The Twin was designed for maximum versatility for live or studio use with features like speaker jacks with selectable impedance, Low-z/XLR output, a "Power Amp Thru" feature that bypassed the preamp circuit and a buffered effects loop. Both clean and overdrive channels could be activated simultaneously and reverb could be turned on/off for each channel. Earlier Twin Reverb amps were known among musicians to be best suited for loud, "clean" tones. The "Red Knob Twin" was made until 1994; During 1994 it was slightly modified and the knobs were changed from red to black, keeping the same shape. It has since been succeeded by the first version "Twin Amps" of Fender's Protube line in 1995. This was the first in the series to use PCB (printed circuit boards) instead of PTP (point to point) wiring. All subsequent models and reissues have used PCBs.

=== 1994–2001 Twin Amp ('94 Twin Amp) ===
This version has Blackface cosmetics, was produced in USA between 1994 and 2001. On the front panel it says Twin Amp. It has two inputs, no vibrato, two channels with gain select on the floor pedal to give it two sounds per channel and an effects loop. It is 100 watts and also has a switch for a Low Power (25 Watt) mode. The amplifier features two 12 inch Eminence special design loudspeakers, 3 speaker output sockets (Series, Main and Parallel) and an output impedance switch for 4, 8, 16 ohms (Main is 16 ohms).

This model is referred to as the "Evil Twin". In 2002 it was replaced by a new Pro Tube "Twin Amp" including tremolo.

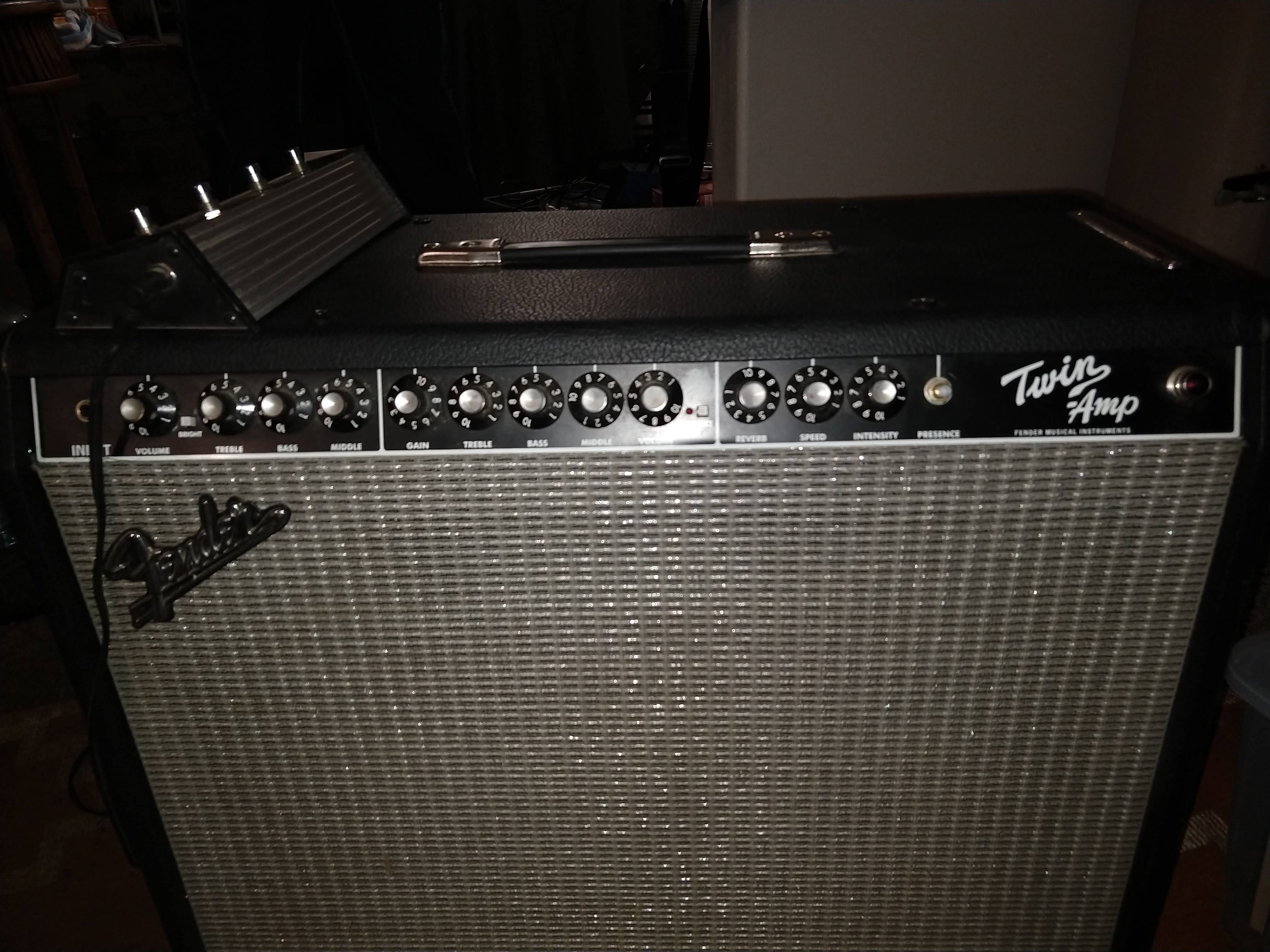
Fender Twin (Pro Tube) Amp

=== 2002–2010 Twin Amp (Pro Tube) ===
This version is very similar in cosmetics with the previous one but it introduces, for the first time, a full tube tremolo in a modern twin amp.

==== Front Panel ====
The front panel contains (left to right): a single input, clean channel controls (volume, bright switch, treble, middle, bass), distorted channel controls (gain, treble, middle, bass, volume, channel select), and shared controls (reverb, tremolo speed and intensity, presence).

==== Rear Panel ====
The rear panel contains power and stand by switches, output power switch (100W or 25W), effect send level, effect loop switch, return level, preamp out, power amp in, footswitch jack, tube bias adjustment and balancing, external speaker jack, main speaker jack.

==== Footswitch ====
The footswitch has four buttons that allow to select the channel, bypass or engage the effect loop, switch the tremolo on/off, switch the reverb on/off.

==== Tremolo ====
The tremolo is an optocoupler signal varying tube bias tremolo that works by changing the bias to a 12AX7 pre-amp tube. By changing the operating parameters of the tube, the signal can be cut off momentarily and then brought back up. This creates the rich, pulsating tremolo effect. Curiously, it can be switched on through the footswitch only.

==== Speakers ====
The amplifier features two 12 inch Eminence special design loudspeakers in parallel (8ohms each, 4 ohms total load). There is no output impedance switch and the total impedance of the main plus external speaker has to be 4 ohms.

== Reissues ==
=== '65 Reissue ===
In 1992 Fender introduced the '65 Reissue, with blackface cosmetics and circuitry, an output rating of 85W RMS and 8Ω Jensen C-12K speakers. The '65 Reissue is constructed with a printed circuit board and new 1/4" phone jacks for the footswitch pedal replacing the older RCA design of the vintage originals. Fender's original intention was to issue only 300 of this model, but it was continued due to its success in the market. The '65 Reissue is also available with a single 15-inch speaker, called the '65 Twin Custom 15.

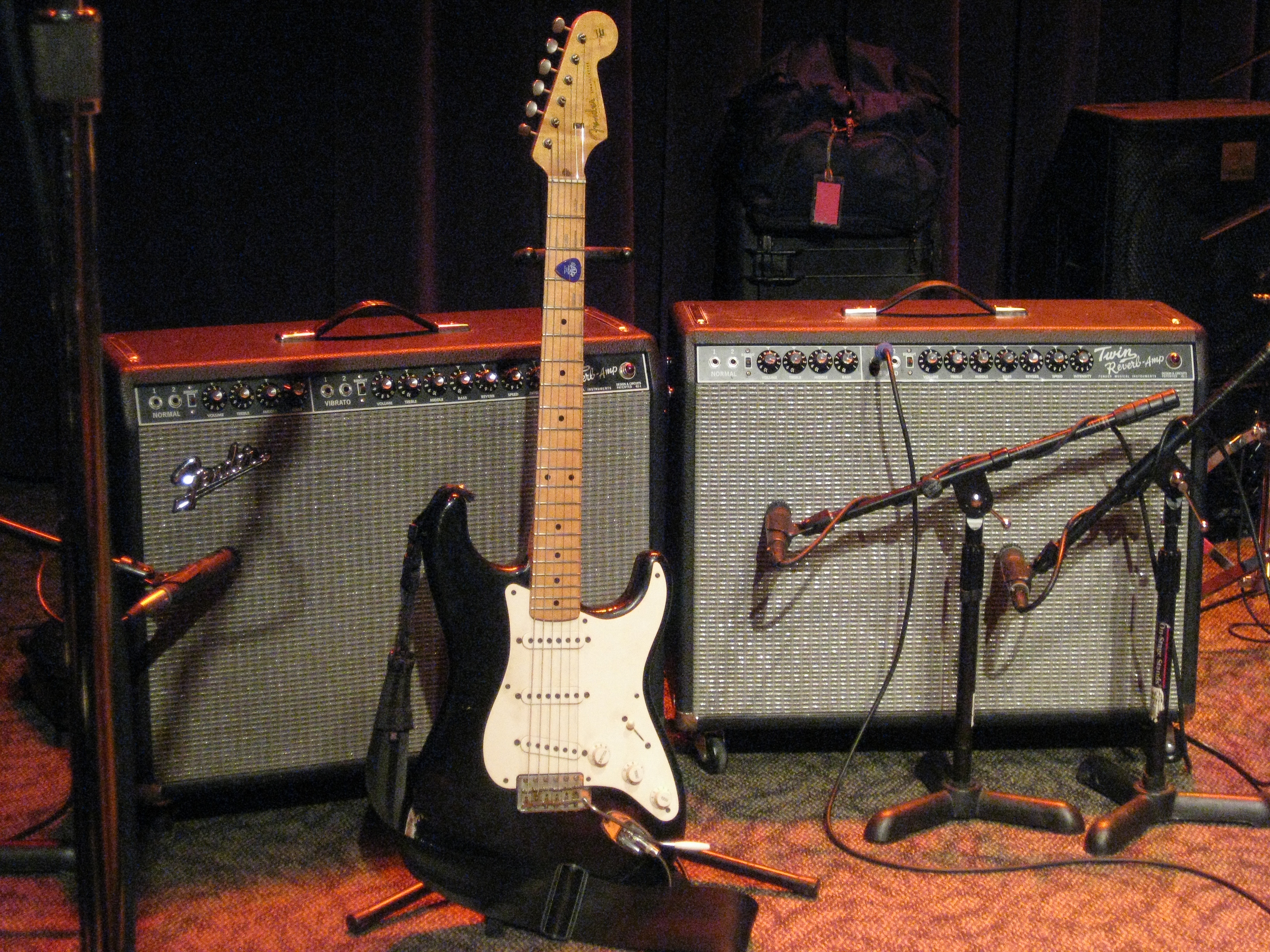
Two Fender Twin Reverb Amps with a Fender Stratocaster

=== '68 Custom ===
In 2013, Fender introduced a redress of the '65 reissue dubbed the '68 Custom Twin Reverb. It came with silverface cosmetics, reverb and vibrato on both channels, altered negative feedback circuitry, Celestion Type V speakers and a "Custom" channel (channel 1) which utilizes a modified tone stack derived from the Fender Bassman. The "vintage" channel (channel 2) is meant to be the typical Twin sound. The output remains at 85W, unlike the original Twin Reverb of 1968.

=== Eric Clapton Twinolux ===
In 2012, Fender released a series of three tweed-style amplifiers as an artist signature line, endorsed by Eric Clapton. One of these amps is the Twinolux, a modified version of the 5E8 Tweed Twin that removed one channel, and added a tremolo effect, with an overall 40W output. Listed at $3,000, it was praised by Vintage Guitar for its "exceptional" tones, both clean and driven.

=== Tone Master Twin Reverb ===
Fender released the Fender Tone Master Twin Reverb in September 2019. The amp aims to digitally recreate the 85 watt output of the original Twin tube amp and weighs a mere 35 lbs.

== See also ==
- List of Fender Amplifier users

== Bibliography ==
- Kelly, Martin, Foster, Terry & Kelly, Paul (2010) Fender: The Golden Age 1946–1970 London & New York: Cassell ISBN 1-84403-666-9.
