= Fender Vibrasonic =

1960s amplifier

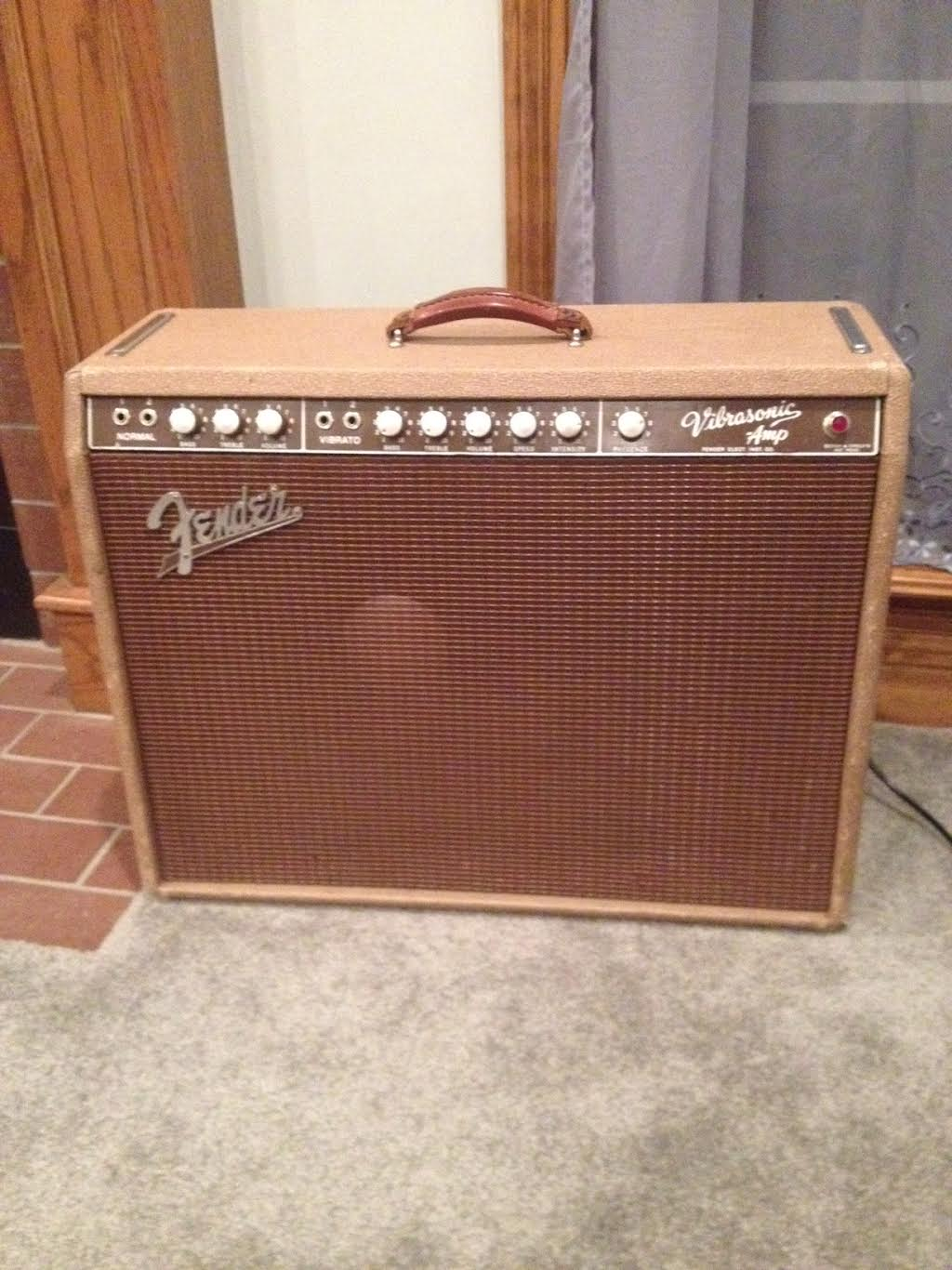
First production from late 1959, model 5G13 with prototype metal knobs and JBL D130 speaker

The Fender Vibrasonic was an amplifier made by Fender. It was debuted as the first of the new-model Fender amps of the 1960s, with new tolex-covered cabinets and front-mounted control panels that would replace the tweed-covered, top-panel cabinets that were prevalent during the 1950s, as well as new circuitry which would characterize most Fender amplifiers for two decades.

The Vibrasonic was introduced in 1959 and was discontinued in 1964. During this period, the "brownface" era, its brown control panel was matched with light brown ("tan") or standard brown tolex cabinets with grill cloth schemes typically in tweed style ("gold stripe") or yellow ("wheat"). At the time of its introduction, the Vibrasonic-Amp displaced the Fender Twin as the company's new top-of-the-line or "flagship" model. This elevated status was short-lived however, as the new high-powered 6G8 blonde Twin-Amp appeared in mid 1960. The Vibrasonic was one of the seven models in the newly designated Professional Series of Fender amplifiers. These amplifiers shared nearly identical circuits, with two (or four) 5881/6L6GC tubes in fixed-bias Class AB configuration, long-tailed pair phase inverters, and dual "normal" and "vibrato" channels with independent volume and tone controls; the models were differentiated only by cabinet/speaker configurations, transformers, and rectifiers. The tremolo ("vibrato") circuit which the Vibrasonic premiered and which gave it its name more closely resembled a Vox tremolo circuit than anything which Fender used before or after, a complex "harmonic vibrato" which created the illusion of true pitch-shifting. Two tubes (5G13 model) and later three tubes (6G13-A model) were used in the tremolo circuit alone and this perhaps explains why it was not widely used, and abandoned in the mid-1960s "blackface" amps.

The 1×15 Vibrasonic, like the 4×10 Concert-Amp, featured a larger interleaved output transformer designed to minimize distortion and maximize clean headroom in the output stage. Unlike the Concert-Amp however, the Vibrasonic-Amp was the first production Fender amplifier to use a speaker made by the James B. Lansing company. JBL speakers were considered superior to the usual Jensen speakers in terms of their power handling capacity and frequency response.

Only the prototypes of this amp were built with metal control knobs, as pictured in the 1960 Fender Musical Instruments catalog. In recent scholarship, the Vibrasonic has been closely associated with the mythical brown tolex, small-box Twin-Amp.

The Vibrasonic name was resurrected in 1995 for the “Custom” Vibrasonic, a 1x15 amplifier with individual Steel and Guitar channels. The “Custom” Vibrasonic was part of a series of amplifiers designed by Fender Custom Shop engineer Bruce Zinky, and incorporated the circuit of a stock Twin Reverb in the Steel channel and the circuit characteristics of Vibro-King and Tonemaster amplifiers (two other Zinky-designs) in the Guitar channel. The “Custom” Vibrasonic was equipped with a special design Eminence 15” speaker and had a relatively short manufacturing run, being discontinued by Fender in 1996.

== See also ==
- Fender Vibrosonic Reverb
