= Daisy Petal Pickin' =

1963 pop song by Jimmy Gilmer and the Fireballs

Single by Jimmy Gilmer and the Fireballs
- B-side: "When My Tears Have Dried"
- Released: October 1963
- Studio: Norman Petty Recording Studios (Clovis, New Mexico)
- Genre: Pop rock
- Length: 2:14
- Label: Dot 16539
- Songwriter(s): Keith McCormack, Glynn Thames, Juanita Jordan

Jimmy Gilmer and the Fireballs singles chronology
"Torquay Two" (1963)	"Daisy Petal Pickin'" (1963)	"Ain't Gonna Tell Anybody" (1964)

"Daisy Petal Pickin'" is a song written by Keith McCormack, Glynn Thames, and Juanita Jordan and performed by Jimmy Gilmer and the Fireballs.

== Chart performance ==
It reached #5 in Australia, #11 for 2 weeks in Canada, and #15 on the Billboard Hot 100 in 1964.
