= Sugar Shack =

Single by Jimmy Gilmer and the Fireballs

from the album Sugar Shack
- B-side: "My Heart Is Free"
- Released: 1963
- Recorded: 1963
- Studio: Norman Petty Recording Studios (Clovis, New Mexico)
- Genre: Pop rock, pop
- Length: 2:00
- Label: Dot
- Songwriters: Keith McCormack; Faye Voss
- Producer: Norman Petty

Jimmy Gilmer and the Fireballs singles chronology
| "Blacksmith Blues" (1963) | "Sugar Shack" (1963) | "Torquay Two" (1963) |

"Sugar Shack" is a song written in 1962 by Keith McCormack. McCormack gave songwriting credit to his aunt, Beulah Faye Voss, after asking what are "those tight pants that girls wear" to which she replied "leotards". The song was recorded in 1963 by Jimmy Gilmer and the Fireballs at Norman Petty Recording Studios in Clovis, New Mexico. The unusual and distinctive instrument part was played by Norman Petty on a Hammond Solovox keyboard, Model L, Series A.

"Sugar Shack" hit No. 1 on both the Billboard Hot 100 (where it spent five weeks from October 12 to November 9, 1963) and Cashbox singles charts (where it spent three weeks from October 19 to November 2, 1963). Its No. 1 run on the Billboard R&B chart was cut short because Billboard did not publish an R&B chart from November 30, 1963 to January 23, 1965. In Canada the song was No. 1, also for six weeks, from October 14 to November 18. In the UK, "Sugar Shack" also reached No. 45 on the Record Retailer chart. Gilmer and The Fireballs were the last American band to chart before Beatlemania hit.

On November 29, 1963, "Sugar Shack" received an RIAA certification for selling over a million copies, earning gold record status. The song was listed at No. 40 on the Hot 100 year-end chart published by Billboard in December 1963. A later revision by Billboard of its year-end rankings for 1963 placed "Sugar Shack" at No. 1, and the magazine has subsequently recognized "Sugar Shack" as the top Hot 100 song of that year. In 2018, the song was listed at number 194 on the "All Time" Billboard Hot 100 60th Anniversary list.

The song is featured in the films Mermaids, Dogfight, Forrest Gump, Congo, and Stealing Sinatra, and in the television show Supernatural.

In December 1965, the song was covered by Steve Brett, a singer from the Midlands area of the UK, and was released as the B-side of his single "Chains On My Heart", on the Columbia label (catalogue number DB7794). His backing group, The Mavericks, included Noddy Holder, who eventually came to fame with Slade.

== Certifications ==
| Region | Certification | Certified units/sales |
|---|---|---|
| United States (RIAA) | Gold | 1,000,000^{^} |
^{^} Shipments figures based on certification alone.
