= Bottle of Wine =

Single by The Fireballs

from the album Bottle of Wine
- B-side: "Can't You See I'm Tryin'"; (Non-album track)
- Released: June 24, 1967
- Studio: Norman Petty Recording Studios (Clovis, New Mexico)
- Genre: Rock
- Length: 2:08
- Label: Atco 6491
- Songwriter: Tom Paxton
- Producer: Norman Petty

The Fireballs singles chronology
"Ja-Da" (1966)	"Bottle of Wine" (1967)	"Goin' Away" (1968)

"Bottle of Wine" is a song written and recorded by Tom Paxton in 1965, and covered by The Fireballs in 1967. Their version peaked at #9 on the Billboard Hot 100 in March 1968 and #5 in Canada. It also reached #3 in South Africa.

The Fireballs' raucous cover of the song included only two of Paxton's four verses with the chorus repeated multiple times near the end. The single later became the title song for an album they released in 1968. Their version was produced by Norman Petty, and was ranked #63 on Billboard magazine's Top Hot 100 songs of 1968.

== Other versions ==
- Judy Collins on her 1964 concert album The Judy Collins Concert.
- Tom Paxton's original was released on his 1965 album, Ain't That News!
- The Kingston Trio covered the song on their 1965 album 'Stay Awhile'
- Joe Brown released a single in 1968.
- Sweeney's Men recorded it with the Capitol Showband in 1970.
- Doc Watson and Merle Watson in 1973, which reached #71 on the U.S. country chart. The song was featured on the duo's 1973 album, Then and Now.
- Bamses Venner recorded a Danish translation on their 1978 album B & V.
