= The Fireballs =

American rock and roll band

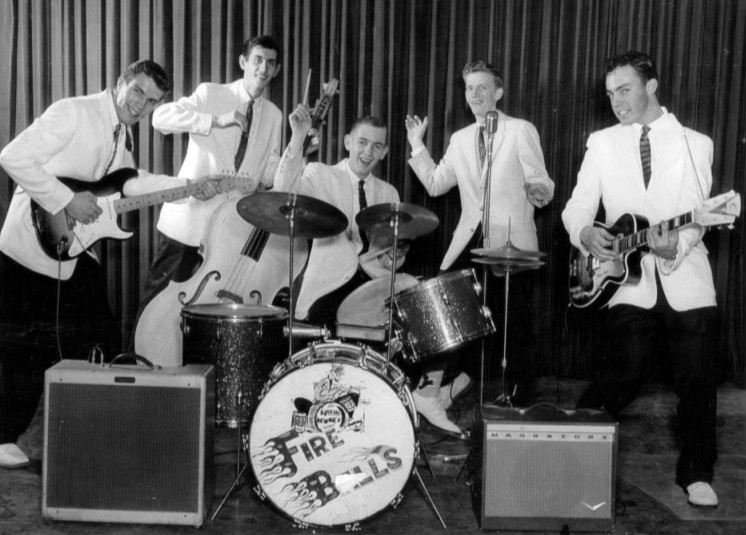
- The group in 1959, from left: George Tomsco, Stan Lark, Eric Budd, Chuck Tharp, Dan Trammell

Background information
- Origin: Raton, New Mexico, U.S.
- Genres: Rock and roll
- Years active: 1957–1969; 1989–2022
- Labels: Top Rank; Dot; ATCO
- Past members: Chuck Tharp; Stan Lark; Eric Budd; George Tomsco; Dan Trammell; Doug Roberts; Jimmy Gilmer

The Fireballs, sometimes billed as Jimmy Gilmer and the Fireballs, were an American rock and roll group, particularly popular at the end of the 1950s and in the early 1960s. The original line-up consisted of George Tomsco (lead guitar), Chuck Tharp (vocals), Stan Lark (bass), Eric Budd (drums), and Dan Trammell (rhythm guitar). Besides their own recordings, the Fireballs were studio musicians for dozens of other recording artist projects from 1959 through 1970 at Norman Petty Recording Studios, including folk singer Carolyn Hester and Arthur Alexander.

== History ==
=== 1957—1969 ===
The Fireballs were formed in Raton, New Mexico, in 1957 and got their start as an instrumental group featuring the distinctive lead guitar of George Tomsco. They recorded at Norman Petty's studio in Clovis, New Mexico. According to group founders Tomsco and Lark, they took their name after their standing ovation performance of Jerry Lee Lewis's "Great Balls of Fire", at the Raton High School PTA talent contest in New Mexico, U.S. They reached the top 40 with the singles "Torquay" (1959), "Bulldog" (1960), and "Quite a Party" (1961). "Quite a Party" peaked at No. 29 in the UK Singles Chart in August 1961. Tharp, Budd, and Trammell left the group in the early 1960s, but the Fireballs added Doug Roberts on drums, plus Petty Studio singer Jimmy Gilmer (born September 15, 1940, in Chicago and raised in Amarillo, Texas) to the group.

Later billed as Jimmy Gilmer and the Fireballs, the group reached No. 1 on the Billboard chart with "Sugar Shack", which remained at that position for five weeks in 1963. The single also reached No. 1 on Billboard's R&B chart for one week in November of that year, but its run on that chart was cut short because Billboard ceased publishing an R&B chart from November 30, 1963, to January 23, 1965. Nonetheless, "Sugar Shack" earned the group a Gold Record Award for "Top Song Of 1963" based on record sales. In the UK, the song peaked at No. 45. Jimmy Gilmer and the Fireballs then had another pop hit in 1964 with a similar-sounding "Daisy Petal Pickin'", which reached No. 15 on the Hot 100.

During the run of "Daisy Petal Pickin'" on the charts, the British Invasion began with the first hits by The Beatles. The group had difficulty competing with the influx of British artists and did not reach the Top 40 again until 1967, with "Bottle of Wine", which was written by Tom Paxton. The Fireballs took "Bottle of Wine" to No. 9 on the Hot 100. Although Gilmer was still a member of the group, the band was billed simply as "The Fireballs" on that single. Gilmer pursued artist management under Petty, with the group disbanding in 1969.

=== 1989—2022 ===
The Fireballs reunited in 1989 for the Clovis Music Festival, then continued performing with original members George Tomsco, Stan Lark, and Chuck Tharp until 2006, when Tharp died of cancer. Gilmer returned as lead vocalist in 2007. Lark retired from the group in 2016. George Tomsco continued to release CDs of new material using The Fireballs name and did the occasional show as a "solo Fireball" and also with Jimmy Gilmer. Their final show together was at the Surf Ballroom in Clear Lake, Iowa, on February 5, 2022.

== Usage of Buddy Holly backing tapes ==
Norman Petty had been Buddy Holly's main recording producer; after Holly's death, he obtained the rights to Holly's early rehearsal and home demo recordings. From May 1962 until August 1968, Petty had the Fireballs overdub the Holly material, making them the band he never knew he had, though the band had met Holly at Petty's studio in 1958. The overdubs were originally released on four albums of "new" Holly material throughout the 1960s with four of the efforts, released as singles, charting. In 1964, they recorded and released an album (solely under Jimmy Gilmer's name) of a dozen Holly covers called Buddy's Buddy, likely inspired by the posthumous collaborations.

== Deaths ==
Drummer Doug Roberts (born June 15, 1941) died on November 18, 1981 aged 40.

Chuck Tharp (born February 3, 1941) died of cancer on March 17, 2006 aged 65.

Stan Lark (born Stanley Roy Lark on July 27, 1940, in Raton, New Mexico) died on August 4, 2021, at age 81 in Amarillo, Texas.

Eric Budd (born Eric James Budd on October 23, 1938, in Raton, New Mexico) died on October 7, 2022, aged 83, in Conway Springs, Kansas.

After suffering from Alzheimer's for two years, Jimmy Gilmer died at the age of 83 in Amarillo, on September 7, 2024, eight days before his 84th birthday.

== Discography ==
=== Singles ===
Note: B-sides appear on the same album as the A-sides except where indicated

Year	Title	Peak chart positions						Record Label	B-side	Album
Year	Title	US	US AC	US R&B	CAN (CHUM) (RPM)	UK	AU	Record Label	B-side	Album
1958	"I Don't Know"	–	–	–	–	–	–	Kapp Records	"Fireball"	Non-LP tracks
1959	"Long Long Ponytail"	–	–	–	–	–	–	Jaro Records	"Let There Be Love"	The Fireballs
1959	"Torquay"	39	–	–	12	–	–	Top Rank Records	"Cry Baby"	The Fireballs
1959	"Bulldog"	24	–	–	23	–	–	Top Rank Records	"Nearly Sunrise"	The Fireballs
1960	"Foot-Patter"	–	–	–	–	–	–	Top Rank Records	"Kissin'"	The Fireballs
1960	"Vaquero (Cowboy)"	99	–	–	–	–	–	Top Rank Records	"Chief Whoopin-Koff" (from Torquay)	Vaquero
1960	"Almost Paradise"	–	–	–	–	–	–	Top Rank Records	"Sweet Talk"	Non-LP tracks
1961	"Rik-A-Tik"	–	–	–	–	–	–	Top Rank Records	"Yacky Doo"	See below
1961	"Rik-A-Tik"	–	–	–	–	–	–	Warwick Records	"Yacky Doo"	Here Are The Fireballs
1961	"Quite a Party"*	27	–	–	24	29	–	Warwick Records	"Gunshot" (Non-LP track)	Torquay
1963	"Blacksmith Blues"	–	–	–	–	–	–	Hamilton Records	"Tuff-A-Nuff" (from Torquay)	Non-LP track
1963	"Sugar Shack"+	1	–	1	1	45	1	Dot Records	"My Heart is Free" (Non-LP track)	Sugar Shack
1963	"Torquay Two"	–	–	–	–	–	–	Dot Records	"Peg Leg" (from Campusology)	Torquay
1963	"Daisy Petal Pickin'"+	15	–	–	11	–	5	Dot Records	"When My Tears Have Dried" (Non-LP track)	Firewater
1964	"Ain't Gonna Tell Anybody"+	53	–	–	40	–	65	Dot Records	"Young Am I"	Non-LP tracks
1964	"Daytona Drag"	–	–	–	–	–	–	Dot Records	"Gently, Gently"	Campusology
1964	"Look at Me"++	–	–	–	–	–	90	Dot Records	"I'll Send For You" (Non-LP track)	Buddy's Buddy
1964	"Wishing"++	–	–	–	–	–	–	Dot Records	"What Kinda Love" (Non-LP track)	Buddy's Buddy
1964	"Dumbo"*	–	–	–	–	–	–	Dot Records	"Mr. Reed" (from Campusology)	Torquay
1964	"Cry Baby" (re-recording)+	–	–	–	–	–	–	Dot Records	"Thunder and Lightning"	Non-LP tracks
1965	"She Belongs to Me"+	–	–	–	–	–	–	Dot Records	"Rambler's Blues"	Folkbeat
1966	"Ja-Da"	–	–	–	–	–	–	Dot Records	"What I Am"	Non-LP tracks
1967	"Bottle of Wine"	9	–	–	5	–	3	Atco Records	"Can't You See I'm Tryin'" (Non-LP track)	Bottle of Wine
1968	"Goin' Away"	79	33	–	11	–	31	Atco Records	"Groovy Motions"	Bottle of Wine
1968	"Chicken Little"	–	–	–	–	–	–	Atco Records	"3 Minutes' Time"	Bottle of Wine
1968	"Come On, React!"	63	–	–	16	–	70	Atco Records	"Woman, Help Me!"	Come On, React!
1969	"Long Green"	73	–	–	42	–	–	Atco Records	"Light in the Window" (from Come On, React!)	Non-LP tracks
1969	"Watch Her Walk"	–	–	–	–	–	–	Atco Records	"Good Morning Shame"	Non-LP tracks

+ = Jimmy Gilmer and the Fireballs
++ = Jimmy Gilmer
* = A-sides re-recorded for album inclusion

=== Albums ===
Year	Album	Record label
1960	The Fireballs	Top Rank Records
1960	Vaquero	Top Rank Records
1961	Here Are the Fireballs	Warrick Records
1963	Sugar Shack+	Dot Records
1963	Torquay	Dot Records
1964	Buddy's Buddy++	Dot Records
1965	Lucky 'Leven++	Dot Records
1965	Folkbeat++	Dot Records
1966	Campusology	Dot Records
1968	Firewater!+	Dot Records
1968	Bottle of Wine	Atco Records
1969	Come On, React!	Atco Records

+ = Jimmy Gilmer and the Fireballs
++ = Jimmy Gilmer
